= 2017 South American Badminton Championships =

Tournament details
- Dates: 5–11 December
- Edition: 12th
- Venue: Carioca Arena 1
- Location: Rio de Janeiro, Brazil

The 2017 South American Badminton Championships (Portuguese: Campeonato Sul-Americano Adulto de Badminton 2017) was a badminton tournament sanctioned by the South American Badminton Confederation and Badminton Pan America. The individual and mixed team events were held from 5 to 11 December 2017.

The tournament was held at Carioca Arena 1 located at the Barra Olympic Park in Rio de Janeiro, Brazil. Five countries took part in the tournament. Suriname withdrew from the tournament.

In the team event, Peru finished in first place. Chile finished in second place after defeating Argentina 5–0 and upsetting the hosts 3–2 in the group tie.

== Medal summary ==
=== Medalists ===
Event	Gold	Silver	Bronze
Men's singles	(Brazil) Artur Silva Pomoceno	(Brazil) Cleyson Nobre	(Brazil) Alisson Vasconcellos
Men's singles	(Brazil) Artur Silva Pomoceno	(Brazil) Cleyson Nobre	(Peru) Daniel la Torre Regal
Women's singles	(Peru) Daniela Macías	(Peru) Fernanda Saponara	(Brazil) Paloma da Silva
Women's singles	(Peru) Daniela Macías	(Peru) Fernanda Saponara	(Peru) Paula la Torre Regal
Men's doubles	(Peru) José Guevara (Peru) Daniel la Torre Regal	(Peru) Bruno Barrueto Deza (Peru) Diego Mini	(Brazil) Rodolfo Salles (Brazil) Alisson Vasconcellos
Men's doubles	(Peru) José Guevara (Peru) Daniel la Torre Regal	(Peru) Bruno Barrueto Deza (Peru) Diego Mini	(Brazil) Luiz Eduardo Martinez (Brazil) Mateus Cutti
Women's doubles	(Brazil) Mariana Pedrol Freitas (Brazil) Thalita Correa	(Brazil) Paula Pereira (Brazil) Fabiana Silva	(Peru) Daniela Macías (Peru) Dánica Nishimura
Women's doubles	(Brazil) Mariana Pedrol Freitas (Brazil) Thalita Correa	(Brazil) Paula Pereira (Brazil) Fabiana Silva	(Peru) Micaela Flores (Peru) Fernanda Saponara
Mixed doubles	(Brazil) Artur Silva Pomoceno (Brazil) Lohaynny Vicente	(Peru) Diego Mini (Peru) Paula la Torre Regal	(Brazil) Alisson Vasconcellos (Brazil) Thayse Cruz
Mixed doubles	(Brazil) Artur Silva Pomoceno (Brazil) Lohaynny Vicente	(Peru) Diego Mini (Peru) Paula la Torre Regal	(Brazil) Felipe Cury (Brazil) Paula Pereira
Mixed team	Peru; Bruno Barrueto Deza; Rodrigo Camogliano Telge; José Guevara; Takeshi Isa; Nicolás Macías; Diego Mini; Gustavo Salazar; Diego Subauste; Daniel la Torre Regal; Matías Zamorano; Inés Castillo; Micaela Castillo; Stefany Chen; Micaela Flores; Daniela Macías; Dánica Nishimura; Ingrid Salas; Fernanda Saponara; Paula la Torre Regal; Valeria Wong	Chile; Patricio Álvarez; Cristián Araya; Diego Castillo; Cristóbal Conejero; Sacha Debouzy; Iván León; Alonso Medel; Nicolás Naupa; Fernando Sanhueza; Jenny Cepeda; Camila Macaya; Andrea Montero; Ashley Montre; Constanza Naranjo; Mickaela Skaric; Javiera Torres; Belen Troncoso	Brazil; Victor Alves; Felipe Cury; Mateus Cutti; Vinicius Gori; Igor Ibrahim; Cleyson Nobre; Artur Silva Pomoceno; Rodolfo Salles; Alisson Vasconcellos; Matheus Voigt; Thalita Correa; Thayse Cruz; Mariana Pedrol Freitas; Marta Lopes; Bianca de Oliveira Lima; Thamires Oliveira; Paula Pereira; Crislaine Santos; Paloma da Silva; Estefane Ventura

=== Medal table ===
* Host nation (Brazil)

Rank	Nation	Gold	Silver	Bronze	Total
1	Peru	3	3	4	10
2	Brazil*	3	2	7	12
3	Chile	0	1	0	1
Totals (3 entries)		6	6	11	23

== Team event ==
=== Round robin ===
Pos	Team	Pld	W	L	MF	MA	MD	GF	GA	GD	PF	PA	PD	Pts	Qualification
1	Peru	3	3	0	12	3	+9	24	7	+17	613	417	+196	3	Champions
2	Chile	3	2	1	9	6	+3	19	13	+6	560	559	+1	2	Runners-up
3	Brazil (H)	3	1	2	9	6	+3	20	13	+7	624	518	+106	1	Third place
4	Argentina	3	0	3	0	15	−15	0	30	−30	329	632	−303	0	Fourth place

Source: TS
(H) Host

Brazil
5
Carioca Arena 1, Court 1
10 December 2017, 09:00 UTC−3

Argentina
0

			1	2	3
1	(Brazil) (Argentina)	Mariana Pedrol Freitas / Paula Pereira; Florencia Bernatene / Bárbara María Berruezo	21; 8	21; 6
2	(Brazil) (Argentina)	Alisson Vasconcellos; Federico Díaz	21; 16	21; 8
3	(Brazil) (Argentina)	Bianca de Oliveira Lima; Florencia Bernatene	21; 7	21; 10
4	(Brazil) (Argentina)	Felipe Cury / Matheus Voigt; Dino Delmastro / Serafín Zayas	21; 7	21; 14
5	(Brazil) (Argentina)	Rodolfo Salles / Thayse Cruz; Federico Díaz / Bárbara María Berruezo	21; 14	21; 1

Peru
4
Carioca Arena 1, Court 2
10 December 2017, 09:00 UTC−3

Chile
1

			1	2	3
1	(Peru) (Chile)	Takeshi Isa / Dánica Nishimura; Cristián Araya / Camila Macaya	11; 21	19; 21
2	(Peru) (Chile)	Daniel la Torre Regal; Iván León	21; 16	21; 11
3	(Peru) (Chile)	Daniela Macías; Ashley Montre	21; 4	21; 5
4	(Peru) (Chile)	José Guevara / Daniel la Torre Regal; Cristián Araya / Iván León	21; 17	21; 9
5	(Peru) (Chile)	Daniela Macías / Dánica Nishimura; Camila Macaya / Ashley Montre	21; 14	21; 8

Brazil
2
Carioca Arena 1, Court 1
10 December 2017, 16:00 UTC−3

Chile
3

			1	2	3
1	(Brazil) (Chile)	Thamires Oliveira / Crislaine Santos; Camila Macaya / Ashley Montre	16; 21	21; 12	21; 19
2	(Brazil) (Chile)	Mateus Cutti; Cristián Araya	21; 17	16; 21	21; 23
3	(Brazil) (Chile)	Victor Alves / Artur Silva Pomoceno; Iván León / Alonso Medel	21; 17	21; 8
4	(Brazil) (Chile)	Thalita Correa; Ashley Montre	17; 21	19; 21
5	(Brazil) (Chile)	Cleyson Nobre / Paula Pereira; Cristián Araya / Camila Macaya	19; 21	16; 21

Peru
5
Carioca Arena 1, Court 2
10 December 2017, 16:00 UTC−3

Argentina
0

			1	2	3
1	(Peru) (Argentina)	José Guevara; Mateo Delmastro	21; 8	21; 10
2	(Peru) (Argentina)	Inés Castillo; Bárbara María Berruezo	21; 15	21; 11
3	(Peru) (Argentina)	Bruno Barrueto Deza / Diego Mini; Nicolas Oliva / Santiago Otero	21; 10	21; 15
4	(Peru) (Argentina)	Nicolás Macías / Fernanda Saponara; Federico Díaz / Maria Celeste Perillat	21; 14	21; 14
5	(Peru) (Argentina)	Stefany Chen / Valeria Wong; Florencia Bernatene / Bárbara María Berruezo	21; 8	21; 1

Brazil
2
Carioca Arena 1, Court 1
11 December 2017, 09:00 UTC−3

Peru
3

			1	2	3
1	(Brazil) (Peru)	Artur Silva Pomoceno / Mariana Pedrol Freitas; Daniel la Torre Regal / Dánica Nishimura	21; 16	21; 18
2	(Brazil) (Peru)	Bianca de Oliveira Lima; Daniela Macías	5; 21	8; 21
3	(Brazil) (Peru)	Artur Silva Pomoceno; José Guevara	21; 12	21; 16
4	(Brazil) (Peru)	Mariana Pedrol Freitas / Bianca de Oliveira Lima; Daniela Macías / Dánica Nishimura	16; 21	21; 23
5	(Brazil) (Peru)	Rodolfo Salles / Alisson Vasconcellos; José Guevara / Daniel la Torre Regal	21; 15	16; 21	14; 21

Chile
5
Carioca Arena 1, Court 2
11 December 2017, 09:00 UTC−3

Argentina
0

			1	2	3
1	(Chile) (Argentina)	Camila Macaya; Bárbara María Berruezo	21; 8	21; 12
2	(Chile) (Argentina)	Cristián Araya / Iván León; Dino Delmastro / Serafín Zayas	21; 17	21; 8
3	(Chile) (Argentina)	Camila Macaya / Ashley Montre; Florencia Bernatene / Maria Celeste Perillat	21; 10	21; 7
4	(Chile) (Argentina)	Cristián Araya; Federico Díaz	21; 15	23; 21
5	(Chile) (Argentina)	Iván León / Ashley Montre; Bárbara María Berruezo / Dino Delmastro	21; 17	21; 17
