= 2018 South American Badminton Championships =

Tournament details
- Dates: 25 November–2 December
- Edition: 11th
- Venue: Polideportivo 2 de la Videna
- Location: Lima, Peru

The 2018 South American Badminton Championships (Spanish: Campeonato Sudamericano Adulto de Badminton 2018) was a badminton tournament sanctioned by the South American Badminton Confederation and Badminton Pan America. The individual and mixed team events were held from 25 November to 2 December 2018.

The tournament was held at Polideportivo 2 de la Videna located in Lima, Peru. Six countries took part in the tournament.

In the team event, Peru finished in first place after winning against all their opponents in the group.

== Medal summary ==
=== Medalists ===
Event	Gold	Silver	Bronze
Men's singles	(Peru) José Guevara	(Brazil) Alisson Vasconcellos	(Brazil) Mateus Cutti
Men's singles	(Peru) José Guevara	(Brazil) Alisson Vasconcellos	(Peru) Bruno Barrueto Deza
Women's singles	(Peru) Daniela Macías	(Peru) Fernanda Saponara	(Peru) Paula la Torre Regal
Women's singles	(Peru) Daniela Macías	(Peru) Fernanda Saponara	(Peru) Inés Castillo
Men's doubles	(Brazil) Mateus Cutti (Brazil) Alisson Vasconcellos	(Brazil) João Marcos Moreira (Brazil) Waleson dos Santos	(Peru) Bruno Barrueto Deza (Peru) Daniel la Torre Regal
Men's doubles	(Brazil) Mateus Cutti (Brazil) Alisson Vasconcellos	(Brazil) João Marcos Moreira (Brazil) Waleson dos Santos	(Peru) José Guevara (Peru) Diego Subauste
Women's doubles	(Peru) Daniela Macías (Peru) Dánica Nishimura	(Peru) Stefany Chen (Peru) Valeria Wong	(Peru) Inés Castillo (Peru) Paula la Torre Regal
Women's doubles	(Peru) Daniela Macías (Peru) Dánica Nishimura	(Peru) Stefany Chen (Peru) Valeria Wong	(Peru) Daniela Zapata (Ecuador) María Delia Zambrano
Mixed doubles	(Peru) Diego Mini (Peru) Paula la Torre Regal	(Brazil) Waleson dos Santos (Brazil) Gabrielle Cavalcante	(Brazil) Felipe Cury (Brazil) Jeisiane Alves
Mixed doubles	(Peru) Diego Mini (Peru) Paula la Torre Regal	(Brazil) Waleson dos Santos (Brazil) Gabrielle Cavalcante	(Peru) Daniel la Torre Regal (Peru) Dánica Nishimura
Mixed team	Peru; Mario Cuba; Bruno Barrueto Deza; José Guevara; Takeshi Isa; Diego Mini; Daniel la Torre Regal; Inés Castillo; Daniela Macías; Dánica Nishimura; Fernanda Saponara; Paula la Torre Regal; Daniela Zapata	Brazil; Victor Alves; João Bajer; Felipe Cury; Mateus Cutti; Igor Ibrahim; João Marcos Moreira; Artur Silva Pomoceno; Waleson dos Santos; Alisson Vasconcellos; Matheus Voigt; Jeisiane Alves; Gabrielle Cavalcante; Emanuelly Rocha Farias; Monaliza Feitosa; Mariana Pedrol Freitas; Jackeline Luz; Bianca de Oliveira Lima	Chile; Patricio Álvarez; Cristián Araya; Sacha Debouzy; Fernando Lillo; Diego Mabe; Matias Mabe; Alonso Medel; Javier Pinilla; Jerman Quilodrán; Fernando Sanhueza; Ricky Vergara; Javiera Islas; Ashley Montre; Constanza Naranjo; Mickaela Skaric; Javiera Torres; Valentina Uribe; Valentina Vasquez; Catalina Villanueva

=== Medal table ===
* Host nation (Peru)

Rank	Nation	Gold	Silver	Bronze	Total
1	Peru*	5	2	7.5	14.5
2	Brazil	1	4	2	7
3	Chile	0	0	1	1
4	Ecuador	0	0	0.5	0.5
Totals (4 entries)		6	6	11	23

== Team event ==
=== Round robin ===
Pos	Team	Pld	W	L	MF	MA	MD	GF	GA	GD	PF	PA	PD	Pts	Qualification
1	Peru (H)	3	3	0	14	1	+13	28	4	+24	657	406	+251	3	Champions
2	Brazil	3	2	1	10	5	+5	23	10	+13	632	528	+104	2	Runners-up
3	Chile	3	1	2	4	11	−7	8	23	−15	480	578	−98	1	Third place
4	Argentina	3	0	3	2	13	−11	5	27	−22	398	655	−257	0	Fourth place

Source: TS
(H) Host

Peru
5
Polideportivo 2 de la Videna, Court 1
28 November 2018, 09:00 UTC−5

Argentina
0

			1	2	3
1	(Peru) (Argentina)	Diego Mini / Paula la Torre Regal; Dino Delmastro / Bárbara María Berruezo	21; 9	21; 12
2	(Peru) (Argentina)	Daniel la Torre Regal; Mateo Delmastro	21; 18	21; 11
3	(Peru) (Argentina)	Inés Castillo; Florencia Bernatene	21; 6	21; 3
4	(Peru) (Argentina)	José Guevara / Takeshi Isa; Dino Delmastro / Pablo Macagno	21; 16	21; 15
5	(Peru) (Argentina)	Daniela Macías / Dánica Nishimura; Florencia Bernatene / Bárbara María Berruezo	21; 3	21; 4

Brazil
4
Polideportivo 2 de la Videna, Court 3
28 November 2018, 15:00 UTC−5

Argentina
1

			1	2	3
1	(Brazil) (Argentina)	Waleson dos Santos; Nicolas Oliva	21; 19	18; 21	15; 21
2	(Brazil) (Argentina)	Jeisiane Alves; Yovela Petrucci	21; 14	21; 9
3	(Brazil) (Argentina)	Felipe Cury / Artur Silva Pomoceno; Dino Delmastro / Pablo Macagno	21; 16	21; 10
4	(Brazil) (Argentina)	Bianca de Oliveira Lima / Mariana Pedrol Freitas; Bárbara María Berruezo / Yovela Petrucci	21; 6	21; 8
5	(Brazil) (Argentina)	Matheus Voigt / Jackeline Luz; Pablo Macagno / Florencia Bernatene	21; 12	21; 13

Peru
5
Polideportivo 2 de la Videna, Court 4
28 November 2018, 15:00 UTC−5

Chile
0

			1	2	3
1	(Peru) (Chile)	José Guevara; Patricio Álvarez	21; 10	21; 16
2	(Peru) (Chile)	Daniela Macías; Javiera Torres	21; 5	21; 7
3	(Peru) (Chile)	José Guevara / Diego Mini; Cristián Araya / Alonso Medel	24; 22	21; 12
4	(Peru) (Chile)	Inés Castillo / Paula la Torre Regal; Javiera Torres / Mickaela Skaric	21; 9	21; 9
5	(Peru) (Chile)	Diego Mini / Dánica Nishimura; Cristián Araya / Constanza Naranjo	21; 9	21; 13

Brazil
5
Polideportivo 2 de la Videna, Court 1
29 November 2018, 09:00 UTC−5

Chile
0

			1	2	3
1	(Brazil) (Chile)	Artur Silva Pomoceno; Alonso Medel	18; 16	21; 15
2	(Brazil) (Chile)	Jackeline Luz; Javiera Torres	21; 9	21; 12
3	(Brazil) (Chile)	Artur Silva Pomoceno / Matheus Voigt; Cristián Araya / Alonso Medel	21; 17	24; 22
4	(Brazil) (Chile)	Mariana Pedrol Freitas / Bianca de Oliveira Lima; Ashley Montre / Mickaela Skaric	21; 12	21; 9
5	(Brazil) (Chile)	Matheus Voigt / Mariana Pedrol Freitas; Cristián Araya / Ashley Montre	21; 14	21; 19

Peru
4
Polideportivo 2 de la Videna, Court 4
29 November 2018, 15:00 UTC−5

Brazil
1

			1	2	3
1	(Peru) (Brazil)	Daniel la Torre Regal / Dánica Nishimura; Artur Silva Pomoceno / Mariana Pedrol Freitas	21; 14	19; 21	21; 14
2	(Peru) (Brazil)	Daniela Macías; Jeisiane Alves	21; 13	21; 12
3	(Peru) (Brazil)	Daniel la Torre Regal; Artur Silva Pomoceno	11; 21	17; 21
4	(Peru) (Brazil)	Daniela Macías / Dánica Nishimura; Mariana Pedrol Freitas / Bianca de Oliveira Lima	21; 16	21; 16
5	(Peru) (Brazil)	José Guevara / Diego Mini; Waleson dos Santos / Matheus Voigt	19; 21	21; 12	21; 16

Chile
4
Polideportivo 2 de la Videna, Court 2
29 November 2018, 15:00 UTC−5

Argentina
1

			1	2	3
1	(Chile) (Argentina)	Cristián Araya / Mickaela Skaric; Dino Delmastro / Bárbara María Berruezo	21; 13	17; 21	21; 17
2	(Chile) (Argentina)	Alonso Medel; Nicolas Oliva	21; 12	23; 21
3	(Chile) (Argentina)	Ashley Montre; Yovela Petrucci	21; 4	21; 4
4	(Chile) (Argentina)	Cristián Araya / Alonso Medel; Nicolas Oliva / Santiago Otero	19; 21	17; 21
5	(Chile) (Argentina)	Ashley Montre / Mickaela Skaric; Bárbara María Berruezo / Yovela Petrucci	21; 13	21; 5
