= 2016 South American Badminton Championships =

Tournament details
- Dates: 7–14 December
- Edition: 11th
- Venue: Polideportivo 2 de la Videna
- Location: Lima, Peru

The 2016 South American Badminton Championships (Spanish: Campeonato Sudamericano Adulto de Badminton 2016) was a badminton tournament sanctioned by the South American Badminton Confederation and Badminton Pan America. The individual and mixed team events were held from 7 to 14 December 2016.

The tournament was held at Polideportivo 2 de la Videna located in Lima, Peru. Six countries took part in the tournament.

In the team event, Brazil finished in first place after winning against all their opponents in the group. Chile achieved third place after defeating Argentina 5–0.

== Medal summary ==
=== Medalists ===
Event	Gold	Silver	Bronze
Men's singles	(Peru) José Guevara	(Brazil) Alisson Vasconcellos	(Peru) Diego Mini
Men's singles	(Peru) José Guevara	(Brazil) Alisson Vasconcellos	(Chile) Iván León
Women's singles	(Peru) Daniela Macías	(Brazil) Paloma da Silva	(Brazil) Naira Vier
Women's singles	(Peru) Daniela Macías	(Brazil) Paloma da Silva	(Peru) Daniela Zapata
Men's doubles	(Chile) Cristián Araya (Chile) Bastián Lizama	(Peru) Bruno Barrueto (Peru) Diego Subauste	(Brazil) Luiz Eduardo Martinez (Brazil) Mateus Cutti
Men's doubles	(Chile) Cristián Araya (Chile) Bastián Lizama	(Peru) Bruno Barrueto (Peru) Diego Subauste	(Peru) José Guevara (Peru) Daniel la Torre
Women's doubles	(Peru) Luz María Zornoza (Peru) Paula la Torre	(Peru) Daniela Macías (Peru) Dánica Nishimura	(Chile) Camila Macaya (Ecuador) Maria Delia Zambrano
Women's doubles	(Peru) Luz María Zornoza (Peru) Paula la Torre	(Peru) Daniela Macías (Peru) Dánica Nishimura	(Brazil) Bianca Lima (Brazil) Naira Vier
Mixed doubles	(Peru) Diego Mini (Peru) Luz María Zornoza	(Brazil) Matheus Voigt (Brazil) Bianca Lima	(Brazil) Lucas Gilinski (Brazil) Paloma da Silva
Mixed doubles	(Peru) Diego Mini (Peru) Luz María Zornoza	(Brazil) Matheus Voigt (Brazil) Bianca Lima	(Peru) Bruno Barrueto (Peru) Fernanda Saponara
Mixed team	Brazil; Lucas Constant; Mateus Cutti; Luiz Eduardo Martinez; Sergio Nakanishi; Gustavo Pereira; Rodolfo Salles; Alisson Vasconcellos; Matheus Voigt; Jaqueline Carvalho; Thayse Cruz; Jaqueline Kempner; Leticia Konno; Marta Lopes; Bianca Lima; Paloma da Silva; Estefane Ventura; Naira Vier	Peru; Bruno Barrueto; Renzo Camogliano; Rodrigo Camogliano; José Guevara; Nicolás Macías; Diego Mini; Diego Subauste; Daniel la Torre; Inés Castillo; Stefany Chen; Micaela Flores; Daniela Macías; Dánica Nishimura; Fernanda Saponara; Paula la Torre; Yue Yang Cao; Daniela Zapata; Luz María Zornoza	Chile; Cristián Araya; Iván León; Bastián Lizama; Camila Macaya; Ashley Montre; Loreto Pontigo

=== Medal table ===
* Host nation (Peru)

Rank	Nation	Gold	Silver	Bronze	Total
1	Peru*	4	3	4	11
2	Brazil	1	3	4	8
3	Chile	1	0	2.5	3.5
4	Ecuador	0	0	0.5	0.5
Totals (4 entries)		6	6	11	23

== Team event ==
=== Round robin ===
Pos	Team	Pld	W	L	MF	MA	MD	GF	GA	GD	PF	PA	PD	Pts	Qualification
1	Brazil	3	3	0	12	3	+9	25	9	+16	671	535	+136	3	Champions
2	Peru (H)	3	2	1	11	4	+7	24	8	+16	647	446	+201	2	Runners-up
3	Chile	3	1	2	7	8	−1	15	17	−2	507	545	−38	1	Third place
4	Argentina	3	0	3	0	15	−15	0	30	−30	332	631	−299	0	Fourth place

Source: TS
(H) Host

Peru
4
Polideportivo 2 de la Videna, Court 1
10 December 2016, 09:00 UTC−5

Chile
1

			1	2	3
1	(Peru) (Chile)	Nicolás Macías; Iván León	16; 21	11; 21
2	(Peru) (Chile)	Daniela Macías; Ashley Montre	21; 5	21; 9
3	(Peru) (Chile)	José Guevara / Daniel la Torre; Cristián Araya / Bastián Lizama	21; 18	21; 15
4	(Peru) (Chile)	Daniela Macías / Dánica Nishimura; Ashley Montre / Loreto Pontigo	21; 4	21; 12
5	(Peru) (Chile)	Diego Mini / Luz María Zornoza; Iván León / Camila Macaya	21; 19	21; 16

Brazil
5
Polideportivo 2 de la Videna, Court 2
10 December 2016, 09:00 UTC−5

Argentina
0

			1	2	3
1	(Brazil) (Argentina)	Gustavo Pereira / Jaqueline Carvalho; Serafín Zayas / Micaela Suárez	21; 12	21; 11
2	(Brazil) (Argentina)	Lucas Constant; Dino Delmastro	21; 19	22; 20
3	(Brazil) (Argentina)	Naira Vier; Ayelen Cichello	21; 13	21; 8
4	(Brazil) (Argentina)	Mateus Cutti / Luiz Eduardo Martinez; Dino Delmastro / Serafín Zayas	21; 16	21; 17
5	(Brazil) (Argentina)	Bianca Lima / Paloma da Silva; Ayelen Cichello / Micaela Suárez	21; 8	21; 12

Brazil
3
Polideportivo 2 de la Videna, Court 1
10 December 2016, 16:00 UTC−5

Peru
2

			1	2	3
1	(Brazil) (Peru)	Matheus Voigt / Bianca Lima; Diego Mini / Luz María Zornoza	26; 28	17; 21
2	(Brazil) (Peru)	Paloma da Silva; Daniela Macías	13; 21	11; 21
3	(Brazil) (Peru)	Alisson Vasconcellos; José Guevara	21; 14	16; 21	22; 20
4	(Brazil) (Peru)	Bianca Lima / Paloma da Silva; Daniela Macías / Dánica Nishimura	15; 21	21; 17	21; 19
5	(Brazil) (Peru)	Alisson Vasconcellos / Matheus Voigt; Bruno Mauricio / José Guevara	22; 20	21; 19

Chile
5
Polideportivo 2 de la Videna, Court 2
10 December 2016, 16:00 UTC−5

Argentina
0

			1	2	3
1	(Chile) (Argentina)	Camila Macaya; Micaela Suárez	21; 5	21; 13
2	(Chile) (Argentina)	Cristián Araya; Dino Delmastro	21; 16	21; 13
3	(Chile) (Argentina)	Ashley Montre / Loreto Pontigo; Ayelen Cichello / Micaela Suárez	21; 10	21; 8
4	(Chile) (Argentina)	Cristián Araya / Bastián Lizama; Dino Delmastro / Serafín Zayas	21; 16	21; 17
5	(Chile) (Argentina)	Iván León / Camila Macaya; Mateo Delmastro / Ayelen Cichello	21; 10	21; 8

Brazil
4
Polideportivo 2 de la Videna, Court 2
11 December 2016, 16:00 UTC−5

Chile
1

			1	2	3
1	(Brazil) (Chile)	Alisson Vasconcellos; Iván León	18; 21	21; 9	21; 8
2	(Brazil) (Chile)	Paloma da Silva; Loreto Pontigo	21; 6	21; 4
3	(Brazil) (Chile)	Alisson Vasconcellos / Matheus Voigt; Cristián Araya / Bastián Lizama	18; 21	22; 20	21; 18
4	(Brazil) (Chile)	Bianca Lima / Paloma da Silva; Ashley Montre / Loreto Pontigo	21; 9	21; 13
5	(Brazil) (Chile)	Matheus Voigt / Bianca Lima; Iván León / Camila Macaya	21; 17	8; 11		retired

Peru
5
Polideportivo 2 de la Videna, Court 1
11 December 2016, 16:00 UTC−5

Argentina
0

			1	2	3
1	(Peru) (Argentina)	Daniela Macías; Ayelen Cichello	21; 6	21; 3
2	(Peru) (Argentina)	Diego Mini; Serafín Zayas	21; 11	21; 15
3	(Peru) (Argentina)	Daniela Macías / Dánica Nishimura; Ayelen Cichello / Micaela Suárez	21; 9	21; 7
4	(Peru) (Argentina)	Bruno Barrueto / José Guevara; Dino Delmastro / Serafín Zayas	21; 12	21; 8
5	(Peru) (Argentina)	Diego Mini / Luz María Zornoza; Mateo Delmastro / Micaela Suárez	21; 7	21; 2
