= 2018 Pan Am Badminton Championships =

Tournament details
- Dates: 15–18 February (Team event); 26–29 April (Individual event)
- Edition: 22
- Venue: National Racket Centre (Team event); Teodoro Palacios Flores Gymnasium (Individual event)
- Location: Tacarigua, Trinidad and Tobago (Team event); Guatemala City, Guatemala (Individual event)

The XXII 2018 Pan Am Badminton Championships was a continental championships tournament of badminton in Pan America. This tournament was held as two events in different countries. From 15 to 18 February, the team event was held in Tacarigua, Trinidad and Tobago. From 26 to 29 April, the individual event was held in Guatemala City, Guatemala.

== Tournament ==
The team event of 2018 Pan Am Badminton Championships officially Male & Female Pan Am Team Continental Championships 2018, was a continental stage tournament of Thomas and Uber Cups, and also to crown the best men's and women's badminton team in Pan America. This event organized by the Badminton Pan Am and Trinidad and Tobago Badminton Association. 15 teams, consisting of 8 men's teams and 7 women's teams entered the tournament.

The individual event of Pan Am Badminton Championships was an individual continental championships tournament of badminton, to crown the best male and female players and pairs in Pan America. The point of this tournament graded as BWF World Tour Super 100 event. This event was organized by the Badminton Pan Am and Federacion Nacional de Badminton Guatemala.

=== Venue ===
- The team event was held at National Racket Centre in the city of Tacarigua, Trinidad and Tobago.
- The individual event venue will be held at the Teodoro Palacios Flores Gymnasium.

=== Point distribution ===
Below is the tables with the point distribution for each phase of the individual event tournament based on the BWF points system for the Pan Am Badminton Championships.

Winner	Runner-up	3/4	5/8	9/16	17/32	33/64	65/128	129/256	257/512	513/1024
5,500	4,680	3,850	3,030	2,110	1,290	510	240	100	45	30

== Medalists ==
Event	Gold	Silver	Bronze
Men's Teams	Canada; Austin James Bauer, Paul-Antoine Dostie-Gundon, Jason Ho-shue, Jonathan Lai, Ty Alexander Lindeman, Nyl Yakura, Brian Yang, Duncan Yao	United States; Philip Chew, Ryan Chew, Calvin Lin, Ricky Liuzhou, Sattawat Pongnairat, Howard Shu	Jamaica; Dennis Coke, Gareth Henry, Matthew Lee, Anthony Mcnee, Samuel Ricketts
Women's Teams	Canada; Anne-Julie Beaulieu, Catherine Choi, Michelle Li, Talia Ng, Stéphanie Pakenham, Brittney Tam, Michelle Tong, Josephine Wu	United States; Natalie Chi, Jamie Hsu, Lauren Lam, Jamie Subandhi, Angela Zhang	Peru; Inés Castillo, Micaela Castillo, Stefany Chen, Micaela Flores, Daniela Macías, Inés Mendoza, Dánica Nishimura, Valeria Wong, Daniela Zapata
Men's singles	(Brazil) Ygor Coelho	(Canada) Jason Ho-shue	(Cuba) Osleni Guerrero
Men's singles	(Brazil) Ygor Coelho	(Canada) Jason Ho-shue	(Guatemala) Kevin Cordón
Women's singles	(Canada) Michelle Li	(Canada) Rachel Honderich	(Canada) Brittney Tam
Women's singles	(Canada) Michelle Li	(Canada) Rachel Honderich	(Mexico) Haramara Gaitan
Men's doubles	(Canada) Jason Ho-shue (Canada) Nyl Yakura	(United States) Phillip Chew (United States) Ryan Chew	(Guatemala) Jonathan Solís (Guatemala) Rodolfo Ramírez
Men's doubles	(Canada) Jason Ho-shue (Canada) Nyl Yakura	(United States) Phillip Chew (United States) Ryan Chew	(Mexico) Job Castillo (Mexico) Lino Muñoz
Women's doubles	(Canada) Rachel Honderich (Canada) Kristen Tsai	(Canada) Michelle Tong (Canada) Josephine Wu	(United States) Jennie Gai (United States) Jamie Hsu
Women's doubles	(Canada) Rachel Honderich (Canada) Kristen Tsai	(Canada) Michelle Tong (Canada) Josephine Wu	(Peru) Inés Castillo (Peru) Paula la Torre
Mixed doubles	(Canada) Ty Alexander Lindeman (Canada) Josephine Wu	(Canada) Nyl Yakura (Canada) Kristen Tsai	(Mexico) Andres Lopez (Mexico) Cynthia González
Mixed doubles	(Canada) Ty Alexander Lindeman (Canada) Josephine Wu	(Canada) Nyl Yakura (Canada) Kristen Tsai	(Guatemala) Jonathan Solís (Guatemala) Diana Corleto

=== Medal table ===
==== Team events ====
Rank	Nation	Gold	Silver	Bronze	Total
1	Canada	2	0	0	2
2	United States	0	2	0	2
3	Jamaica	0	0	1	1
3	Peru	0	0	1	1
Totals (4 entries)		2	2	2	6

==== Individual events ====
Rank	Nation	Gold	Silver	Bronze	Total
1	Canada	4	4	1	9
2	Brazil	1	0	0	1
3	United States	0	1	1	2
4	Guatemala	0	0	3	3
4	Mexico	0	0	3	3
6	Cuba	0	0	1	1
6	Peru	0	0	1	1
Totals (7 entries)		5	5	10	20

== Team events ==
=== Men's team ===
==== Group A ====
Pos	Team	Pld	W	L	MF	MA	MD	GF	GA	GD	PF	PA	PD	Pts	Qualification
1	Canada	2	2	0	10	0	+10	20	0	+20	422	217	+205	2	Knockout stage
2	Peru	2	1	1	5	5	0	10	11	−1	356	357	−1	1	Knockout stage
3	Barbados	2	0	2	0	10	−10	1	20	−19	238	442	−204	0	

Source: TS

==== Group B ====
Pos	Team	Pld	W	L	MF	MA	MD	GF	GA	GD	PF	PA	PD	Pts	Qualification
1	United States	3	3	0	11	4	+7	26	12	+14	743	564	+179	3	Knockout stage
2	Jamaica	3	2	1	11	4	+7	25	11	+14	685	571	+114	2	Knockout stage
3	Dominican Republic	3	1	2	7	8	−1	16	19	−3	599	664	−65	1	
4	Trinidad and Tobago	3	0	3	1	14	−13	4	29	−25	443	671	−228	0	

Source: TS

==== Knockout stage ====
Semi-finals
17 February
Canada	3
Jamaica	1
17 February
Peru	2
United States	3

Final
18 February
Canada	3
United States	0

===== Fifth place game =====
Date	Team 1	Result	Team 2
17 Feb	Barbados	0 – 3	Dominican Republic

===== Third place game =====
Date	Team 1	Result	Team 2
18 Feb	Jamaica	3 – 0	Peru

==== Final standings ====
Rank	Team
1	Canada
2	United States
3	Jamaica
4	Peru
5	Dominican Republic
6	Barbados
7	Trinidad and Tobago

=== Women's team ===
==== Group A ====
Pos	Team	Pld	W	L	MF	MA	MD	GF	GA	GD	PF	PA	PD	Pts	Qualification
1	United States	2	2	0	10	0	+10	20	0	+20	420	172	+248	2	Knockout stage
2	Guatemala	2	1	1	5	5	0	10	10	0	319	334	−15	1	Knockout stage
3	Trinidad and Tobago	2	0	2	0	10	−10	0	20	−20	187	420	−233	0	

Source: TS

==== Group B ====
Pos	Team	Pld	W	L	MF	MA	MD	GF	GA	GD	PF	PA	PD	Pts	Qualification
1	Canada	1	1	0	5	0	+5	10	0	+10	210	120	+90	1	Knockout stage
2	Peru	1	0	1	0	5	−5	0	10	−10	120	210	−90	0	Knockout stage
3	Dominican Republic	2	0	2	0	0	0	0	0	0	0	0	0	0	Withdrew

Source: TS

==== Knockout stage ====
Semi-finals
17 February
United States	3
Peru	0
17 February
Guatemala	0
Canada	3

Final
18 February
United States	0
Canada	3

===== Third place game =====
Date	Team 1	Result	Team 2
18 Feb	Peru	3 – 1	Guatemala

==== Final standings ====
Rank	Team
1	Canada
2	United States
3	Peru
4	Guatemala
5	Trinidad and Tobago

== Individual event ==
=== Men's singles ===
==== Seeds ====
1. (Brazil) Ygor Coelho (champion)
2. (Guatemala) Kevin Cordón (semifinals)
3. (Canada) Jason Ho-shue (final)
4. (Cuba) Osleni Guerrero (semifinals)
5. (Cuba) Leodannis Martínez (third round)
6. (Mexico) Job Castillo (quarterfinals)
7. (Mexico) Lino Muñoz (quarterfinals)
8. (Peru) Daniel la Torre (third round)

==== Finals ====
Semifinals
1	(Brazil) Ygor Coelho	21	21
4	(Cuba) Osleni Guerrero	17	7
3	(Canada) Jason Ho-shue	21	21
2	(Guatemala) Kevin Cordón	14	17

Final
1	(Brazil) Ygor Coelho	21	21
3	(Canada) Jason Ho-shue	12	15

==== Top half ====
===== Section 1 =====
First Round
(Brazil) F Farias	21	21
(Peru) D Mini	15	19
(Canada) A Li	21	21
(United States) G N Gunawan	11	11

Second Round
1	(Brazil) Y Coelho	21	21
(Guatemala) Y del Cid	9	9
(Chile) I León	8	11
(Brazil) F Farias	21	21
8	(Peru) D la Torre	21	21
(El Salvador) J Alas	10	5
(Canada) B Yang	21	21
(Canada) A Li	10	11

Third Round
1	(Brazil) Y Coelho	21	21
(Brazil) F Farias	14	9
8	(Peru) D la Torre	18	5
(Canada) B Yang	21	21

Quarterfinals
1	(Brazil) Y Coelho	21	21
(Canada) B Yang	14	16

===== Section 2 =====
First Round
(Cuba) E Reyes	21	21
(Barbados) D Thorpe	17	10
(El Salvador) M Mejia	7	9
(Mexico) J Rodriguez	21	21
(Chile) A Medel	21	21
(Guatemala) J Granados	11	7

Second Round
4	(Cuba) O Guerrero	27	21
(Guatemala) C Martínez	25	17
(United States) M Fogarty	2	7
(Cuba) E Reyes	21	21
6	(Mexico) J Castillo	21	21
(Mexico) J Rodriguez	9	10
(Costa Rica) E Hurtado	2	7
(Chile) A Medel	21	21

Third Round
4	(Cuba) O Guerrero	21	21
(Cuba) E Reyes	13	10
6	(Mexico) J Castillo	21	21
(Chile) A Medel	7	10

Quarterfinals
4	(Cuba) O Guerrero	21	16	21
6	(Mexico) J Castillo	13	21	12

==== Bottom half ====
===== Section 3 =====
First Round
(Barbados) D Howell	9	4
(El Salvador) U Canjura	21	21
(Chile) C Araya	14	11
(Mexico) L Montoya	21	21
(Guatemala) H Humblers	21	21
(Peru) N Macias	9	9

Second Round
(El Salvador) U Canjura	19	21	19
(Brazil) A Pomoceno	21	10	21
(Mexico) L Montoya	14	21	14
5	(Cuba) L Martínez	21	8	21
(Guatemala) H Humblers	21	21
(United States) R Liuzhou	12	12
(Suriname) S Opti	13	15
3	(Canada) J Ho-shue	21	21

Third Round
(Brazil) A Pomoceno	21	21
5	(Cuba) L Martínez	11	15
(Guatemala) H Humblers	10	8
3	(Canada) J Ho-shue	21	21

Quarterfinals
(Brazil) A Pomoceno	17	13
3	(Canada) J Ho-shue	21	21

===== Section 4 =====
First Round
(Guatemala) D Dieguez	12	21	9
(Brazil) M Cutti	21	19	21
(Canada) L Couture	8	14
(United States) B Seguin	21	21

Second Round
(Brazil) M Cutti	21	21
(Costa Rica) G Cavallotti	12	14
(Peru) J Guevara	15	17
7	(Mexico) L Muñoz	21	21
(United States) B Seguin	21	21
(Barbados) S Martin	11	9
(Panama) K Seixas	7	5
2	(Guatemala) K Cordón	21	21

Third Round
(Brazil) M Cutti	11	11
7	(Mexico) L Muñoz	21	21
(United States) B Seguin	21	11	12
2	(Guatemala) K Cordón	16	21	21

Quarterfinals
7	(Mexico) L Muñoz	13	21	14
2	(Guatemala) K Cordón	21	13	21

=== Women's singles ===
==== Seeds ====
1. (Canada) Michelle Li (champion)
2. (Canada) Rachel Honderich (final)
3. (Canada) Brittney Tam (semifinals)
4. (Peru) Daniela Macías (third round)
5. (United States) Jamie Hsu (quarterfinals)
6. (Cuba) Tahimara Oropeza (third round)
7. (United States) Disha Gupta (quarterfinals)
8. (Peru) Fernanda Saponara (second round)

==== Finals ====
Semifinals
1	(Canada) Michelle Li	21	21
3	(Canada) Brittney Tam	10	18
(Mexico) Haramara Gaitan	7	10
2	(Canada) Rachel Honderich	21	21

Final
1	(Canada) Michelle Li	21	21
2	(Canada) Rachel Honderich	15	16

==== Top half ====
===== Section 1 =====
First Round
(Cuba) Y Ortiz	17	20
(Mexico) M Ugalde	21	22
(Guatemala) A Albanes	16	18
(Costa Rica) L Villalobos	21	21

Second Round
1	(Canada) M Li	21	21
(El Salvador) D Matamoros	4	2
(El Salvador) U Cecilia	8	6
(Mexico) M Ugalde	21	21
5	(United States) J Hsu	21	21
(Ecuador) M Zambrano	10	12
(United States) J Gai	21	21
(Costa Rica) L Villalobos	12	10

Third Round
1	(Canada) M Li	21	21
(Mexico) M Ugalde	13	18
5	(United States) J Hsu	17	21	21
(United States) J Gai	21	19	19

Quarterfinals
1	(Canada) M Li	21	21
5	(United States) J Hsu	18	12

===== Section 2 =====
First Round
(Brazil) J Lima	21	21
(Chile) A Montre	11	5
(Barbados) T Williams	9	8
(Canada) T Ng	21	21
(El Salvador) K Lara	21	14	14
(Brazil) B Lima	19	21	21

Second Round
3	(Canada) B Tam	21	21
(Mexico) S Solis	11	9
(Guatemala) D Corleto	15	20
(Brazil) J Lima	21	22
8	(Peru) F Saponara	11	10
(Canada) T Ng	21	21
(Peru) I Castillo	20	19
(Brazil) B Lima	22	21

Third Round
3	(Canada) B Tam	21	21
(Brazil) J Lima	15	16
(Canada) T Ng	21	21
(Brazil) B Lima	5	9

Quarterfinals
3	(Canada) B Tam	21	15	21
(Canada) T Ng	15	21	15

==== Bottom half ====
===== Section 3 =====
First Round
(Barbados) S Scott	2	4
(Mexico) H Gaitan	21	21
(Chile) M Skaric	16	6
(Brazil) J Alves	21	21
(Brazil) F Silva	21	21
(Chile) C Naranjo	10	11

Second Round
(Mexico) H Gaitan	21	21
(Costa Rica) A Martínez	11	9
(Brazil) J Alves	15	12
6	(Cuba) T Oropesa	21	21
(Brazil) F Silva	22	21
(United States) I Zhong	20	16
(Peru) D Zapata	10	10
4	(Peru) D Macías	21	21

Third Round
(Mexico) H Gaitan	15	21	21
6	(Cuba) T Oropesa	21	14	17
(Brazil) F Silva	21	18	21
4	(Peru) D Macías	16	21	18

Quarterfinals
(Mexico) H Gaitan	24	21
(Brazil) F Silva	22	18

===== Section 4 =====
First Round
(Guatemala) A Paiz	13	15
(Mexico) Y Duarte	21	21
(Panama) N Fedney	12	6
(Guatemala) M Barrios	21	21

Second Round
(Mexico) Y Duarte	21	21
(El Salvador) F Centeno	10	10
(Cuba) A Artiz	8	7
7	(United States) D Gupta	21	21
(Guatemala) M Barrios	21	21
(Guatemala) D Monterroso	12	16
(Guatemala) M Paiz	13	9
2	(Canada) R Honderich	21	21

Third Round
(Mexico) Y Duarte	14	12
7	(United States) D Gupta	21	21
(Guatemala) M Barrios	9	8
2	(Canada) R Honderich	21	21

Quarterfinals
7	(United States) D Gupta	12	12
2	(Canada) R Honderich	21	21

=== Men's doubles ===
==== Seeds ====
1. (Canada) Jason Ho-shue / Nyl Yakura (champions)
2. (United States) Phillip Chew / Ryan Chew (final)
3. (Mexico) Job Castillo / Lino Muñoz (semifinals)
4. (Guatemala) Jonathan Solís / Rodolfo Ramírez (semifinals)

==== Finals ====
Semifinals
1	(Canada) Jason Ho-shue (Canada) Nyl Yakura	21	21
4	(Guatemala) Jonathan Solís (Guatemala) Rodolfo Ramírez	12	11
3	(Mexico) Job Castillo (Mexico) Lino Muñoz	22	10
2	(United States) Phillip Chew (United States) Ryan Chew	24	21

Final
1	(Canada) Jason Ho-shue (Canada) Nyl Yakura	21	21
2	(United States) Phillip Chew (United States) Ryan Chew	17	17

==== Top half ====
===== Section 1 =====
First Round

Second Round
1	(Canada) J Ho-shue (Canada) N Yakura	21	21
(Barbados) S Martin (Barbados) D Thorpe	10	13
(Peru) J Guevara (Peru) D la Torre	21	21
(Guatemala) B Alavardo (Guatemala) C Martínez	10	18

Quarterfinals
1	(Canada) J Ho-shue (Canada) N Yakura	21	21
(Peru) J Guevara (Peru) D la Torre	14	12

===== Section 2 =====
First Round
(Mexico) A Lopez (Mexico) L Montoya	16	19
(Cuba) O Guerrero (Cuba) L Martínez	21	21

Second Round
4	(Guatemala) Jonathan S (Guatemala) R Ramírez	21	21
(United States) M Cohn (United States) D Schoppe	5	11
(Brazil) F Farias (Brazil) M Voigt	18	10
(Cuba) O Guerrero (Cuba) L Martínez	21	21

Quarterfinals
4	(Guatemala) Jonathan S (Guatemala) R Ramírez	21	21
(Cuba) O Guerrero (Cuba) L Martínez	18	19

==== Bottom half ====
===== Section 3 =====
First Round
(Canada) J Lai (Canada) T A Lindeman	21	21
(Brazil) M Cutti (Brazil) R Salles	19	16

Second Round
(Canada) J Lai (Canada) T A Lindeman	21	21
(Peru) B Barrueto (Peru) D Subauste	16	12
(Guatemala) K Cordón (Guatemala) A Marroquín	19	13
3	(Mexico) J Castillo (Mexico) L Muñoz	21	21

Quarterfinals
(Canada) J Lai (Canada) T A Lindeman	19	21	21
3	(Mexico) J Castillo (Mexico) L Muñoz	21	17	23

===== Section 4 =====
First Round

Second Round
(Chile) C Araya (Chile) I León	21	21
(Costa Rica) G Cavallotti (Costa Rica) E Hurtado	12	18
(El Salvador) J Alas (El Salvador) M Mejía	5	9
2	(United States) P Chew (United States) R Chew	21	21

Quarterfinals
(Chile) C Araya (Chile) I León	14	10
2	(United States) P Chew (United States) R Chew	21	21

=== Women's doubles ===
==== Seeds ====
1. (Peru) Daniela Macías / Dánica Nishimura (quarterfinals)
2. (United States) Ariel Lee / Sydney Lee (quarterfinals)
3. (Canada) Michelle Tong / Josephine Wu (final)
4. (Peru) Ines Castillo / Paula la Torre (semifinals)

==== Finals ====
Semifinals
(United States) Jennie Gai (United States) Jamie Hsu	17	15
3	(Canada) Michelle Tong (Canada) Josephine Wu	21	21
4	(Peru) Ines Castillo (Peru) Paula la Torre Regal	10	12
(Canada) Rachel Honderich (Canada) Kristen Tsai	21	21

Final
3	(Canada) Michelle Tong (Canada) Josephine Wu	21	17	14
(Canada) Rachel Honderich (Canada) Kristen Tsai	17	21	21

==== Top half ====
===== Section 1 =====
First Round

Second Round
1	(Peru) D Macías (Peru) D Nishimura	18	21	23
(Cuba) T Oropeza (Cuba) Y Ortiz	21	18	21
(United States) J Gai (United States) J Hsu	21	18	21
(Brazil) J Lima (Brazil) L Vicente	17	21	19

Quarterfinals
1	(Peru) D Macías (Peru) D Nishimura	18	18
(United States) J Gai (United States) J Hsu	21	21

===== Section 2 =====
First Round
(Mexico) H Gaitan (Mexico) S Solis	21	21
(Chile) A Montre (Chile) C Naranjo	7	12

Second Round
3	(Canada) M Tong (Canada) J Wu	21	21
(El Salvador) U Cecilia (El Salvador) D Matamoros	8	6
(Guatemala) D Corleto (Guatemala) M Paiz	22	15	12
(Mexico) H Gaitan (Mexico) S Solis	20	21	21

Quarterfinals
3	(Canada) M Tong (Canada) J Wu	23	21
(Mexico) H Gaitan (Mexico) S Solis	21	12

==== Bottom half ====
===== Section 3 =====
First Round
(Brazil) B Lima (Brazil) E Ventura	21	21
(Costa Rica) A Martínez (Costa Rica) L Villalobos	10	12

Second Round
(Brazil) B Lima (Brazil) E Ventura	12	13
(Mexico) C González (Mexico) M Ugalde	21	21
(Guatemala) A Albanes (Guatemala) A Paiz	14	21
4	(Peru) I Castillo (Peru) P la Torre	21	23

Quarterfinals
(Mexico) C González (Mexico) M Ugalde	21	21	18
4	(Peru) I Castillo (Peru) P la Torre	16	23	21

===== Section 4 =====
First Round

Second Round
(Canada) R Honderich (Canada) K Tsai	21	21
(Guatemala) M Barrios (Guatemala) D Monterroso	8	7
(El Salvador) F Centeno (El Salvador) K Lara	15	22	12
2	(United States) A Lee (United States) S Lee	21	21

Quarterfinals
(Canada) R Honderich (Canada) K Tsai	21	21
2	(United States) A Lee (United States) S Lee	8	11

=== Mixed doubles ===
==== Seeds ====
1. (Peru) Daniel la Torre Regal / Dánica Nishimura (quarterfinals)
2. (Cuba) Leodannis Martínez / Tahimara Oropeza (quarterfinals)
3. (United States) Mathew Fogarty / Isabel Zhong (second round)
4. (Brazil) Artur Silva Pomoceno / Fabiana Silva (third round)
5. (Brazil) Matheus Voigt / Jaqueline Lima (third round)
6. (Mexico) Andres Lopez / Cynthia Gonzalez (semifinals)
7. (Guatemala) Jonathan Solís / Diana Corleto Soto (semifinals)
8. (Peru) Bruno Barrueto Deza / Fernanda Saponara Rivva (third round)

==== Finals ====
Semifinals
(Canada) Nyl Yakura (Canada) Kristen Tsai	21	21
6	(Mexico) Andres Lopez (Mexico) Cynthia González	11	17
(Canada) Ty Alexander Lindeman (Canada) Josephine Wu	21	21
7	(Guatemala) Jonathan Solís (Guatemala) Diana Corleto	15	14

Final
(Canada) Nyl Yakura (Canada) Kristen Tsai	14	24
(Canada) Ty Alexander Lindeman (Canada) Josephine Wu	21	26

==== Top half ====
===== Section 1 =====
First Round

Second Round
1	(Peru) D la Torre (Peru) D Nishimura	21	21
(Peru) D Subauste (Peru) D Zapata	12	6
(Canada) J Lai (Canada) M Tong	21	21
(Barbados) D Thorpe (Barbados) T Williams	16	14
5	(Brazil) M Voigt (Brazil) J Lima	21	21
(Brazil) F Farias (Brazil) L Vicente	19	15
(El Salvador) U Canjura (El Salvador) F Centeno	10	7
(Canada) N Yakura (Canada) Kristen Tsai	21	21

Third Round
1	(Peru) D la Torre (Peru) D Nishimura	21	21
(Canada) J Lai (Canada) M Tong	19	18
5	(Brazil) M Voigt (Brazil) J Lima	19	15
(Canada) N Yakura (Canada) K Tsai	21	21

Quarterfinals
1	(Peru) D la Torre (Peru) D Nishimura	10	19
(Canada) N Yakura (Canada) K Tsai	21	21

===== Section 2 =====
First Round
(United States) R Liuzhou (United States) A Zhang	21	21
(Guatemala) A Flores (Guatemala) A Paiz	19	17

Second Round
3	(United States) M Fogarty (United States) I Zhong	21	9	19
(United States) R Chew (United States) S Lee	12	21	21
(Chile) I León (Chile) M Skaric	25	22
(Costa Rica) G Cavallotti (Costa Rica) L Villalobos	23	20
6	(Mexico) A Lopez (Mexico) C González	23	21
(Cuba) E Reyes (Cuba) Y Ortiz	21	16
(Guatemala) A Ortiz (Guatemala) D Monterroso	14	8
(United States) R Liuzhou (United States) A Zhang	21	21

Third Round
(United States) R Chew (United States) S Lee	21	21
(Chile) I León (Chile) M Skaric	19	18
6	(Mexico) A Lopez (Mexico) C González	21	21
(United States) R Liuzhou (United States) A Zhang	18	19

Quarterfinals
(United States) R Chew (United States) S Lee	14	12
6	(Mexico) A Lopez (Mexico) C González	21	21

==== Bottom half ====
===== Section 3 =====
First Round
(Panama) K Seixas (Panama) N Fedney	12	8
(Peru) D Mini (Peru) P la Torre	21	21

Second Round
(Peru) D Mini (Peru) P la Torre	21	21
(Costa Rica) E Hurtado (Costa Rica) A Martínez	7	8
(Guatemala) C Albanes (Guatemala) A Albanes	9	11
8	(Peru) B Barrueto (Peru) F Saponara	21	21
(Canada) T A Lindeman (Canada) J Wu	21	21
(Mexico) L Montoya (Mexico) S Solis	8	12
(El Salvador) J Alas (El Salvador) D Matamoros	10	4
4	(Brazil) A Pomoceno (Brazil) F Silva	21	21

Third Round
(Peru) D Mini (Peru) P la Torre	19	21	17
8	(Peru) B Barrueto (Peru) F Saponara	21	16	21
(Canada) T A Lindeman (Canada) J Wu	21	21
4	(Brazil) A Pomoceno (Brazil) F Silva	16	11

Quarterfinals
(Peru) B Barrueto (Peru) F Saponara	12	14
(Canada) T A Lindeman (Canada) J Wu	21	21

===== Section 4 =====
First Round

Second Round
(United States) P Chew (United States) A Lee	21	21
(Barbados) S M Martin (Barbados) S Scott	15	15
(Canada) N Nguyen (Canada) A Mocanu	21	19	21
7	(Guatemala) Jonathan S (Guatemala) D Corleto	14	21	23
(Guatemala) A Marroquin (Guatemala) M Paiz	21	21
(Brazil) R Salles (Brazil) E Ventura	15	16
(El Salvador) M Mejia (El Salvador) K Lara	5	18
2	(Cuba) L Martínez (Cuba) T Oropeza	21	21

Third Round
(United States) P Chew (United States) A Lee	21	14	18
7	(Guatemala) Jonathan S (Guatemala) D Corleto	13	21	21
(Guatemala) A Marroquín (Guatemala) M Paiz	13	21
2	(Cuba) L Martínez (Cuba) T Oropeza	21	23

Quarterfinals
7	(Guatemala) Jonathan S (Guatemala) D Corleto	21	24
2	(Cuba) L Martínez (Cuba) T Oropeza	10	22
