= Badminton at the 2019 Pan American Games – Mixed doubles =

Badminton – Mixed doubles at the 2019 Pan American Games
- Venue: Polideportivo 3
- Dates: July 29 – August 2
- Competitors: 56 from 18 nations

Medalists
Gold medal	Joshua Hurlburt-Yu; Josephine Wu	Canada
Silver medal	Nyl Yakura; Kristen Tsai	Canada
Bronze medal	Fabricio Farias; Jaqueline Lima	Brazil
Bronze medal	Howard Shu; Paula Lynn Obañana	United States

The mixed doubles badminton event at the 2019 Pan American Games will be held from July 29 – August 2nd at the Polideportivo 3 in Lima, Peru. The defending Pan American Games champion is Phillip Chew and Jamie Subandhi of the United States.

Each National Olympic Committee could enter a maximum of four athletes (two pairs) into the competition. The athletes will be drawn into an elimination stage draw. Once a team lost a match, it will be not longer be able to compete. Each match will be contested as the best of three games.

== Seeds ==
The following pairs were seeded:

1. Joshua Hurlburt-Yu / Josephine Wu (CAN) (champions)
2. Howard Shu / Paula Lynn Obañana (USA) (semifinals)
3. Nyl Yakura / Kristen Tsai (CAN) (final)
4. Fabricio Farias / Jaqueline Lima (BRA) (semifinals)

== Results ==
=== Finals ===
Final
1	Joshua Hurlburt-Yu (CAN); Josephine Wu (CAN)	18	21	21
3	Nyl Yakura (CAN); Kristen Tsai (CAN)	21	12	15

=== Top half ===
First Round
A Baque (ECU); M D Zambrano (ECU)	21	21
K Seixas (PAN); K Yau (PAN)	11	7
M Cuba (PER); D Macías (PER)	17	17
R Chew (USA); K-Y Chen (USA)	21	21
G Henry (JAM); K Wynter (JAM)	16	13
L Muñoz (MEX); H Gaitan (MEX)	21	21
L Martínez (CUB); Y Ortiz (CUB)	21	21
N Ramdhani (GUY); P Ramdhani (GUY)	8	14
C Araya (CHI); C Naranjo (CHI)	19	15
N Javier (DOM); N Jiménez (DOM)	21	21
D Thorpe (BAR); T Williams (BAR)	21	21
G Cavallotti (CRC); L Villalobos (CRC)	13	10

Second Round
1	J Hurlburt-Yu (CAN); J Wu (CAN)	21	21
A Baque (ECU); M D Zambrano (ECU)	9	8
R Chew (USA); K-Y Chen (USA)	21	18	22
L Muñoz (MEX); H Gaitan (MEX)	19	21	24
4	F Farias (BRA); J Lima (BRA)	21	21
L Martínez (CUB); Y Ortiz (CUB)	17	17
N Javier (DOM); N Jiménez (DOM)	21	21
D Thorpe (BAR); T Williams (BAR)	16	12

Quarterfinals
1	J Hurlburt-Yu (CAN); J Wu (CAN)	21	21
L Muñoz (MEX); H Gaitan (MEX)	16	19
4	F Farias (BRA); J Lima (BRA)	21	21
N Javier (DOM); N Jiménez (DOM)	8	19

Semifinals
1	J Hurlburt-Yu (CAN); J Wu (CAN)	20	21	21
4	F Farias (BRA); J Lima (BRA)	22	17	13

=== Bottom half ===
First Round
U Canjura (ESA); F Centeno (ESA)	15	11
J Solís (GUA); D Corleto (GUA)	21	21
O Guerrero (CUB); T Oropeza (CUB)	21	21
D Howell (BAR); S Scott (BAR)	7	10
A S Pomoceno (BRA); F Silva (BRA)	21	21
S Ricketts (JAM); T Richardson (JAM)	9	17
C Brito (DOM); B Polanco (DOM)	14	23
A López (MEX); S Solis (MEX)	21	25
D Mini (PER); D Nishimura (PER)	21	21
N Oliva (ARG); I Gualdi (ARG)	16	11
I León (CHI); A Montre (CHI)	21	21
F Barrios (VEN); T Sanchez (VEN)	18	12

Second Round
J Solís (GUA); D Corleto (GUA)	13	10
O Guerrero (CUB); T Oropeza (CUB)	21	21
A S Pomoceno (BRA); F Silva (BRA)	11	10
3	N Yakura (CAN); K Tsai (CAN)	21	21
A López (MEX); S Solis (MEX)	10	18
D Mini (PER); D Nishimura (PER)	21	21
I León (CHI); A Montre (CHI)	21	14	11
2	H Shu (USA); P L Obanana (USA)	17	21	21

Quarterfinals
O Guerrero (CUB); T Oropeza (CUB)	10	14
3	N Yakura (CAN); K Tsai (CAN)	21	21
D Mini (PER); D Nishimura (PER)	22	12	16
2	H Shu (USA); P L Obanana (USA)	20	21	21

Semifinals
3	N Yakura (CAN); K Tsai (CAN)	21	21
2	H Shu (USA); P L Obanana (USA)	15	15
