= Badminton at the 2018 South American Games =

Badminton events in Cochabamba, Bolivia

- Venue: Evo Morales Coliseum
- Location: Villa Tunari, Cochabamba, Bolivia
- Dates: 26–31 May

There were six badminton events at the 2018 South American Games. The events were held from 26 May to 31 May at the Evo Morales Coliseum in Cochabamba, Bolivia.

== Medal table ==
The table below gives an overview of the medal standings of badminton events at the 2018 South American Games.

Rank	Nation	Gold	Silver	Bronze	Total
1	Brazil (BRA)	4	3	0	7
2	Peru (PER)	2	3	6	11
3	Chile (CHI)	0	0	4	4
4	Venezuela (VEN)	0	0	1	1
Totals (4 entries)		6	6	11	23

== Medalists ==
The table below gives an overview of the medal winners of badminton events at the 2018 South American Games.

Event	Gold	Silver	Bronze
Men's events
Men's singles	Ygor Coelho; Brazil	Artur Pomoceno; Brazil	José Guevara; Peru Daniel la Torre; Peru
Men's doubles	Ygor Coelho; Artur Pomoceno; Brazil	Diego Mini; Bruno Barrueto; Peru	José Guevara; Daniel la Torre; Peru Cristian Araya; Iván León; Chile
Women's events
Women's singles	Fabiana Silva; Brazil	Daniela Macías; Peru	Paula la Torre; Peru Inés Castillo; Peru
Women's doubles	Daniela Macías; Dánica Nishimura; Peru	Luana Vicente; Fabiana Silva; Brazil	Ines Castillo; Paula la Torre; Peru Ashley Montre; Constanza Naranjo; Chile
Mixed events
Mixed doubles	Daniel la Torre; Dánica Nishimura; Peru	Artur Pomoceno; Luana Vicente; Brazil	Iván León; Ashley Montre; Chile Jesús Sánchez; Michelle Martínez; Venezuela
Mixed team	Artur Pomoceno; Ygor Coelho; Fabiana Silva; Luana Vicente; Brazil	Bruno Barrueto; Daniel la Torre; Diego Mini; José Guevara; Danica Nishimura; Daniela Macias; Inés Castillo; Paula la Torre; Peru	Ashley Montre; Cristian Araya; Iván León; Constanza Naranjo; Fernando Sanhueza; Javiera Torres; Chile

== Results ==
=== Men ===
Final four

Semifinals
(Brazil) Ygor Coelho	21	21
(Peru) José Guevara	3	13
(Peru) Daniel la Torre	18	14
(Brazil) Artur Pomoceno	21	21

Final
(Brazil) Ygor Coelho	19	23	21
(Brazil) Artur Pomoceno	21	21	12

Top half

Round 1
(Paraguay) Julio González	16	11
(Venezuela) Frank Barrios	21	21
(Bolivia) Paolo Arauz	16	11
(Venezuela) Joiser Calanche	21	21

Round 2
(Brazil) Ygor Coelho	21	21
(Bolivia) Roly Toledo	6	5
(Peru) Diego Mini	21	21
(Venezuela) Frank Barrios	13	10
(Peru) José Guevara	21	21
(Argentina) Serafín Zayas	5	10
(Chile) Fernando Sanhueza	21	21
(Venezuela) Joiser Calanche	17	16

Quarterfinals
(Brazil) Ygor Coelho	21	21
(Peru) Diego Mini	12	8
(Peru) José Guevara	21	21
(Chile) Fernando Sanhueza	14	13

Semifinals
(Brazil) Ygor Coelho	21	21
(Peru) José Guevara	3	13

Bottom Half

Round 1
(Paraguay) Maurício Torres	8	12
(Chile) Iván León	21	21
(Guyana) Narayan Ramdhani	11	6
(Venezuela) Jesús Sánchez	21	21
(Chile) Cristian Araya	21	21
(Bolivia) Esteban Limache	9	12

Round 2
(Chile) Iván León	21	21
(Argentina) Dino Delmastro	11	18
(Venezuela) Jesús Sánchez	16	11
(Peru) Daniel la Torre	21	21
(Chile) Cristian Araya	21	21
(Paraguay) Ren Jie Lee	6	16
(Suriname) Mitch Tong	5	12
(Brazil) Artur Pomoceno	21	21

Quarterfinals
(Chile) Iván León	21	15	13
(Peru) Daniel la Torre	18	21	21
(Chile) Cristian Araya	6	9
(Brazil) Artur Pomoceno	21	21

Semifinals
(Peru) Daniel la Torre	18	14
(Brazil) Artur Pomoceno	21	21

=== Men's doubles ===
Round 1
(Paraguay) Matias Villalba (Paraguay) Mauricio Torres	21	17	18
(Bolivia) Esteban Limache (Bolivia) Roly Toledo	14	21	21
(Peru) Bruno Barrueto (Peru) Diego Mini	21	21
(Bolivia) Paolo Arauz (Bolivia) Henry Mendoza	8	13
(Paraguay) Julio González (Paraguay) Ren Jie Lee	13	11
(Argentina) Dino Delmastro (Argentina) Serafín Zayas	21	21

Quarterfinals
(Peru) José Guevara (Peru) Daniel la Torre	21	21
(Venezuela) Frank Barrios (Venezuela) Jesús Sánchez	10	5
(Brazil) Ygor Coelho (Brazil) Artur Pomoceno	21	21
(Bolivia) Esteban Limache (Bolivia) Roly Toledo	10	3
(Peru) Bruno Barrueto (Peru) Diego Mini	21	21
(Venezuela) Joiser Calanche (Venezuela) Alexander Hernandez	11	10
(Argentina) Dino Delmastro (Argentina) Serafín Zayas	13	7
(Chile) Cristian Araya (Chile) Iván León	21	21

Semifinals
(Peru) José Guevara (Peru) Daniel la Torre	15	18
(Brazil) Ygor Coelho (Brazil) Artur Pomoceno	21	21
(Peru) Bruno Barrueto (Peru) Diego Mini	21	21
(Chile) Cristian Araya (Chile) Iván León	14	17

Final
(Brazil) Ygor Coelho (Brazil) Artur Pomoceno	23	21
(Peru) Bruno Barrueto (Peru) Diego Mini	21	18

=== Women ===
Round 1
(Peru) Daniela Macías	21	21
(Bolivia) Ángela Condori	5	4
(Venezuela) Daibelis Mendoza	20	21	19
(Chile) Constanza Naranjo	22	17	21
(Peru) Paula la Torre	21	21
(Chile) Javiera Torres	5	10
(Bolivia) Daniela Barrientos	9	6
(Argentina) Florencia Bernatene	21	21
(Chile) Ashley Montre	8	24	21
(Venezuela) Damaris Ortiz	21	22	14
(Ecuador) Maria Delia Zambrano	13	22
(Peru) Inés Castillo	21	24
(Venezuela) Tiffany Sánchez	21	21
(Bolivia) Juanita Siviora	10	10
(Argentina) Bárbara Berruezo	3	8
(Brazil) Fabiana Silva	21	21

Quarterfinals
(Peru) Daniela Macías	21	21
(Chile) Constanza Naranjo	8	4
(Peru) Paula la Torre	21	21
(Argentina) Florencia Bernatene	8	14
(Chile) Ashley Montre	10	13
(Peru) Inés Castillo	21	21
(Venezuela) Tiffany Sánchez	10	7
(Brazil) Fabiana Silva	21	21

Semifinals
(Peru) Daniela Macías	21	21
(Peru) Paula la Torre	8	11
(Peru) Inés Castillo	16	13
(Brazil) Fabiana Silva	21	21

Final
(Peru) Daniela Macías	13	20
(Brazil) Fabiana Silva	21	22

=== Women's doubles ===
First round
(Brazil) Luana Vicente (Brazil) Fabiana Silva	21	21
(Venezuela) Damaris Ortiz (Venezuela) Michelle Martínez	11	6

Quarterfinals
(Peru) Daniela Macías (Peru) Dánica Nishimura	21	21
(Bolivia) Ángela Condori (Bolivia) Flora Rojas	3	5
(Venezuela) Daibelis Mendoza (Venezuela) Tiffany Sánchez	21	10	16
(Chile) Ashley Montre (Chile) Constanza Naranjo	12	21	21
(Brazil) Luana Vicente (Brazil) Fabiana Silva	21	21
(Bolivia) Daniela Barrientos (Bolivia) Juanita Siviora	4	7
(Argentina) Bárbara Berruezo (Argentina) Florencia Bernatene	9	11
(Peru) Inés Castillo (Peru) Paula la Torre	21	21

Semifinals
(Peru) Daniela Macías (Peru) Dánica Nishimura	21	21
(Chile) Ashley Montre (Chile) Constanza Naranjo	5	8
(Brazil) Luana Vicente (Brazil) Fabiana Silva	21	21
(Peru) Inés Castillo (Peru) Paula la Torre	9	11

Final
(Peru) Daniela Macías (Peru) Dánica Nishimura	22	21
(Brazil) Luana Vicente (Brazil) Fabiana Silva	20	10

=== Mixed doubles ===
First round
(Argentina) Serafín Zayas (Argentina) Florencia Bernatene	13	17
(Venezuela) Joiser Calanche (Venezuela) Tiffany Sánchez	21	21
(Chile) Fernando Sanhueza (Chile) Javiera Torres	11	10
(Venezuela) Jesús Sánchez (Venezuela) Michelle Martínez	21	21
(Argentina) Dino Delmastro (Argentina) Bárbara Berruezo	10	15
(Brazil) Artur Pomoceno (Brazil) Luana Vicente	21	21

Quarterfinals
(Peru) Daniel la Torre (Peru) Dánica Nishimura	21	21
(Bolivia) Esteban Limache (Bolivia) Juanita Siviora	10	5
(Chile) Iván León (Chile) Ashley Montre	21	19	21
(Venezuela) Joiser Calanche (Venezuela) Tiffany Sánchez	16	21	13
(Venezuela) Jesús Sánchez (Venezuela) Michelle Martínez	21	21
(Bolivia) Paolo Arauz (Bolivia) Ángela Condori	8	5
(Brazil) Artur Pomoceno (Brazil) Luana Vicente	19	21	21
(Peru) Diego Mini (Peru) Paula la Torre	21	13	19

Semifinals
(Peru) Daniel la Torre (Peru) Dánica Nishimura	21	21
(Chile) Iván León (Chile) Ashley Montre	12	10
(Venezuela) Jesús Sánchez (Venezuela) Michelle Martínez	17	15
(Brazil) Artur Pomoceno (Brazil) Luana Vicente	21	21

Final
(Peru) Daniel la Torre (Peru) Dánica Nishimura	21	21
(Brazil) Artur Pomoceno (Brazil) Luana Vicente	17	11
