= Susana Naspolini =

Brazilian journalist (1972–2022)

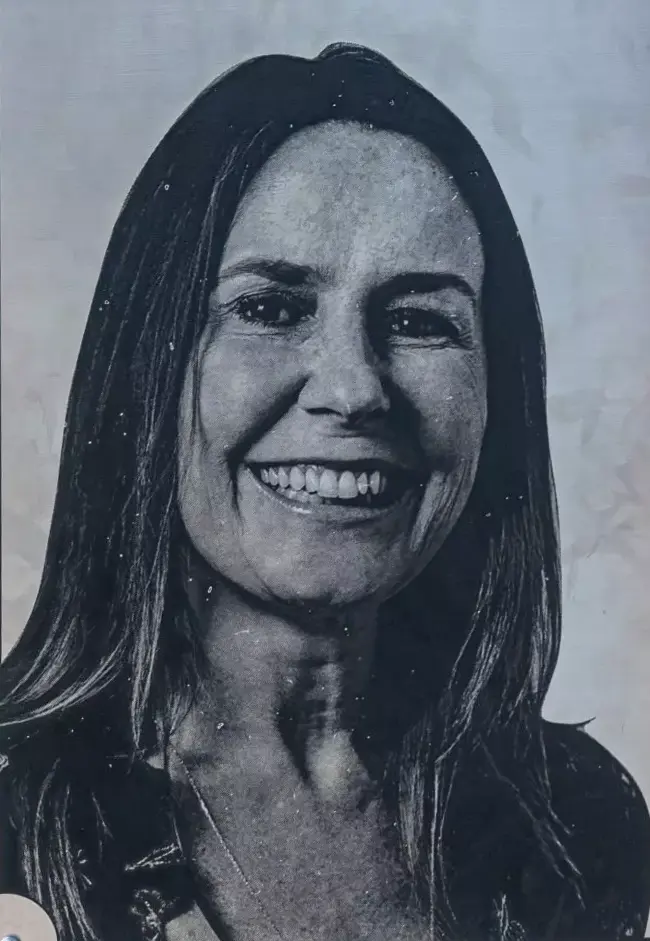
- Naspolini's photo on the inauguration plaque of the Susana Naspolini Realengo Park.
- Born: December 20, 1972; Criciúma, Santa Catarina, Brazil
- Died: October 25, 2022 (aged 49); São Paulo, Brazil
- Occupations: Journalist, reporter, television presenter and writer
- Spouse: Maurício Torres (m. 2002; died 2014)
- Children: 1

Susana Dal Farra Naspolini Torres, better known as Susana Naspolini (December 20, 1972 – October 25, 2022), was a Brazilian journalist, reporter, television presenter and writer. Naspolini passed by SBT and RBS and she worked by years on TV Globo, being her biggest highlight the segment RJ Móvel, of the newscast RJTV, demanding action from the competent authorities solutions to problems that affect the people from Rio de Janeiro, in an irreverent and charismatic way.

== Biography ==
Naspolini passed in the university entrance exam in 1990, to the social communication course in the Federal University of Santa Catarina, but in the following year, she dropped out the university to take a theatre course on the O Tablado Theatre, in Rio de Janeiro. Backing to Florianópolis, in 1992, Naspolini gave continuation to her studies in Journalism and started her career in the then TV O Estado, affiliated with SBT (today NDTV, affiliated with Record). In 1994, she was hired by RBS TV (today NSC TV), where she presented the newscast Bom Dia Santa Catarina. Three years later, Naspolini became chief editor and presenter of the local newscast.

In 2002, Naspolini married the sports narrator Maurício Torres and four years later, she has a daughter, Julia Naspolini. In 2014, Naspolini was widowed after Torres passed away due to cardiac arrhythmia.

In 2004, Naspolini became reporter of the local newscast RJTV and four years later, she joined to RJ Móvel, community journalism segment where, together with the population, she demanded from the authorities in the cities of the Greater Rio de Janeiro in an irreverent way and where she acted for more than ten years, until her death. Naspolini was not the one reporter of the segment, but her participation was so marcant that, after her death, the station discontinued the format.

In 2019, Naspolini launched her first book, Eu Escolho Ser Feliz (I Choose To Be Happy), an autobiography about her fight against the cancer, by Editora Agir. In 2021, she launched her second and last book, Terapia com Deus (Therapy with God), by Editora Petra.

== Health ==
Naspolini always battled cancer, facing the disease five times in her life. At the age of 18, she was diagnosticated with a lymphoma. After, in 2010, she had breast cancer for first time and a thyroid tumor. In 2016, Naspolini had to take medical leave from the newscast to undergo treatment for breast cancer once again. Finally, in 2020, she is diagnosticated with a pelvic cancer, which evolved to bone metastasis over the course of two years. Naspolini dead at age 49, on October 25, 2022, in São Paulo, due to complications from cancer.
