= Michelle Tong =

Canadian badminton player (born 1997)

Michelle Tong 唐祎敏
Personal information
- Born: Tong Yee Min; 25 January 1997 (age 29) Singapore
- Years active: 2015–present
- Height: 1.66 m (5 ft 5 in)

Sport
- Country: Canada
- Sport: Badminton
- Handedness: Right
- Coached by: Efendi Wijaya; Faye Liang

Women's & mixed doubles
- Highest ranking: 66 (WD with Josephine Wu 15 June 2017); 334 (XD with Brian Yang 17 March 2020)
- BWF profile
Medal record
Women's badminton
Representing Canada
Pan Am Championships
Gold medal – first place	2016 Campinas	Women's doubles
Gold medal – first place	2017 Havana	Women's doubles
Silver medal – second place	2018 Guatemala City	Women's doubles
Pan Am Mixed Team Championships
Gold medal – first place	2016 Campinas	Mixed team
Gold medal – first place	2017 Santo Domingo	Mixed team
Pan Am Women's Team Championships
Gold medal – first place	2018 Tacarigua	Women's team

Michelle Tong (born 25 January 1997) is a Canadian badminton player. She won the women's doubles gold medals at the 2016 and 2017 Pan Am Championships. Tong was part of the Canadian winning team at the 2016 and 2017 Pan Am Mixed Team Championships, and also at the 2018 Pan Am Women's Team Championships.

== Achievements ==
=== Pan Am Championships ===
Women's doubles
Year	Venue	Partner	Opponent	Score	Result
2016	Clube Fonte São Paulo; Campinas, Brazil	(Canada) Josephine Wu	(Peru) Paula la Torre (Peru) Luz María Zornoza	21–17, 21–17	Gold
2017	Sports City Coliseum; Havana, Cuba	(Canada) Josephine Wu	(Peru) Daniela Macías (Peru) Dánica Nishimura	21–11, 21–12	Gold
2018	Teodoro Palacios Flores Gymnasium; Guatemala City, Guatemala	(Canada) Josephine Wu	(Canada) Rachel Honderich (Canada) Kristen Tsai	21–17, 17–21, 14–21	Silver
