= Iván León (badminton) =

Chilean badminton player (born 1996)

Personal information
- Born: Iván León But; 19 January 1996 (age 30)
- Height: 1.87 m (6 ft 2 in)
- Weight: 77 kg (170 lb)

Sport
- Country: Chile
- Sport: Badminton

Men's singles & doubles
- Highest ranking: 272 (MS 24 Oct 2013); 173 (MD 22 Sep 2016); 183 (XD 24 Oct 2013)
- BWF profile
Medal record
Men's badminton
Representing Chile
Pan Am Championships
Bronze medal – third place	2016 Campinas	Men's singles
Bronze medal – third place	2016 Campinas	Men's doubles
South American Games
Bronze medal – third place	2018 Cochabamba	Men's doubles
Bronze medal – third place	2018 Cochabamba	Mixed doubles
Bronze medal – third place	2018 Cochabamba	Mixed team

Iván León But (born 19 January 1996) is a Chilean badminton player. In 2015, he competed at the Pan American Games in Toronto, Canada. In 2016, he became the men's doubles runner-up at the Chile International tournament partnered with Bastián Lizama and the champion in the mixed doubles event with Camila Macaya. He also won two bronze medals at the 2016 Pan Am Badminton Championships in the men's singles and doubles event. He clinched three bronze medals at the 2018 South American Games in the men's doubles, mixed doubles and team event.

== Achievements ==
=== Pan Am Championships ===
Men's singles

Year	Venue	Opponent	Score	Result
2016	Clube Fonte São Paulo, Campinas, Brazil	(Brazil) Artur Pomoceno	16–21, 21–18, 12–21	Bronze

Men's doubles

Year	Venue	Partner	Opponent	Score	Result
2016	Clube Fonte São Paulo, Campinas, Brazil	(Chile) Cristian Araya	(Canada) Jason Anthony Ho-shue (Canada) Nyl Yakura	9–21, 13–21	Bronze

=== South American Games ===
Men's doubles

Year	Venue	Partner	Opponent	Score	Result
2018	Evo Morales Coliseum, Cochabamba, Bolivia	(Chile) Cristian Araya	(Peru) Bruno Barrueto (Peru) Diego Mini	14–21, 17–21	Bronze

Mixed doubles

Year	Venue	Partner	Opponent	Score	Result
2018	Evo Morales Coliseum, Cochabamba, Bolivia	(Chile) Ashley Montre	(Peru) Daniel la Torre (Peru) Dánica Nishimura	12–21, 10–21	Bronze

=== BWF International Challenge/Series ===
Men's doubles

Year	Tournament	Partner	Opponent	Score	Result
2016	Chile International	(Chile) Bastián Lizama	(Chile) Diego Castillo (Chile) Alonso Medel	10–21, 12–21	(silver) Runner-up

Mixed doubles

Year	Tournament	Partner	Opponent	Score	Result
2016	Chile International	(Chile) Camila Macaya	(Chile) Alonso Medel (Chile) Mickaela Skaric	21–7, 18–21, 21–13	(gold) Winner

BWF International Challenge tournament
BWF International Series tournament
BWF Future Series tournament
