= Perú International Series =

Badminton championships

The Perú International Series or Perú Future Series is an international open badminton tournament in Peru, established since 2015, organized by the Federación Deportiva Peruana de Bádminton, sanctioned by the Badminton World Federation and Badminton Pan Am. This tournament was held for the first time from 19 to 22 February 2015 at the Polideportivo 2, Centro de Alto Rendimiento, Villa Deportiva Nacional, in Lima. The tournament is the second grade of the international tournament in Peru after the Peru International, and in 2018 the tournament downgraded to BWF Future Series event. In 2022, it was upgraded to BWF International Series event and in 2023 it was scheduled to host 2 grade event.

== Previous winners ==
=== Perú International Series ===
Year	Men's singles	Women's singles	Men's doubles	Women's doubles	Mixed doubles	Ref
2015	(Guatemala) Kevin Cordón	(Turkey) Cemre Fere	(Turkey) Emre Vural (Turkey) Sinan Zorlu	(Brazil) Lohaynny Vicente (Brazil) Luana Vicente	(Peru) Mario Cuba (Peru) Katherine Winder	
2016	(Japan) Yusuke Onodera	(Finland) Airi Mikkelä	(India) Alwin Francis (India) Tarun Kona	(Japan) Chisato Hoshi (Japan) Naru Shinoya	(Peru) Mario Cuba (Peru) Katherine Winder	
2017	(Mexico) Luis Ramón Garrido	(Peru) Daniela Macías	(Austria) Daniel Graßmück (Austria) Luka Wraber	(Peru) Daniela Macías (Peru) Dánica Nishimura	(Peru) Mario Cuba (Peru) Katherine Winder	
2018– 2021	No competition					
2022	(Brazil) Jonathan Matias	(Brazil) Juliana Viana Vieira	(Canada) Lam Wai Lok (England) Kern Pong	(Brazil) Jaqueline Lima (Brazil) Sâmia Lima	(Brazil) Fabrício Farias (Brazil) Jaqueline Lima	
2023	(Italy) Fabio Caponio	(Peru) Inés Castillo	(Spain) Rubén García (Spain) Carlos Piris	(Spain) Paula López (Spain) Lucía Rodríguez	(Spain) Jacobo Fernández (Spain) Paula López	
2024	(Israel) Misha Zilberman	(Brazil) Juliana Viana Vieira	(Brazil) Izak Batalha (Brazil) Matheus Voigt	(Brazil) Jaqueline Lima (Brazil) Sâmia Lima	(Mexico) Luis Montoya (Mexico) Miriam Rodríguez	
2025	(Guatemala) Kevin Cordón	(Brazil) Juliana Viana Vieira	(Brazil) Fabrício Farias (Brazil) Davi Silva	(Brazil) Jaqueline Lima (Brazil) Sâmia Lima	(Brazil) Davi Silva (Brazil) Sânia Lima	
2026	(Italy) Giovanni Toti	(Switzerland) Jenjira Stadelmann	(United States) Ryan Nibu (United States) Joshua Yang	(Guatemala) Diana Corleto (Guatemala) Nikté Sotomayor	(Guatemala) Christopher Martínez (Guatemala) Diana Corleto	

=== Perú Future Series ===
Year	Men's singles	Women's singles	Men's doubles	Women's doubles	Mixed doubles	Ref
2018	(Mexico) Luis Ramón Garrido	(Peru) Daniela Macías	(Peru) José Guevara (Peru) Daniel la Torre	(Peru) Daniela Macías (Peru) Dánica Nishimura	(Peru) Daniel la Torre (Peru) Dánica Nishimura	
2019	(Canada) B. R. Sankeerth	(Cuba) Tahimara Oropeza	(Cuba) Osleni Guerrero (Cuba) Leodannis Martínez	(Peru) Daniela Macías (Peru) Dánica Nishimura	(United States) Vinson Chiu (United States) Breanna Chi	
2020	(Japan) Yushi Tanaka	(Japan) Momoka Kimura	(Guatemala) Rubén Castellanos (Guatemala) Christopher Martínez	(Peru) Daniela Macías (Peru) Dánica Nishimura	(Peru) Daniel la Torre (Peru) Paula la Torre	
2021– 2022	No competition					
2023	(Indonesia) Muhammad Sultan	(Peru) Inés Castillo	(England) Kelvin Ho (Jamaica) Samuel Ricketts	(Peru) Inés Castillo (Peru) Paula la Torre	(Peru) Diego Mini (Peru) Paula la Torre	
2024	Cancelled					
2025	No competition					
2026	(Canada) Xiaodong Sheng	(Peru) Inés Castillo	(Canada) Jason Mak (Canada) Wong Yan Kit	(Brazil) Tamires Santos (Brazil) Ana Júlia Ywata	(Peru) Sharum Durand (Peru) Rafaela Munar	

== Performances by nation ==
=== Perú International Series ===
As of the 2026 edition

Pos	Nation	MS	WS	MD	WD	XD	Total
1	Brazil	1	3	2	4	2	12
2	Peru	0	2	0	1	3	6
3	Guatemala	2	0	0	1	1	4
4	Spain	0	0	1	1	1	3
5	Italy	2	0	0	0	0	2
5	Japan	1	0	0	1	0	2
5	Mexico	1	0	0	0	1	2
5	Turkey	0	1	1	0	0	2
9	Austria	0	0	1	0	0	1
9	Finland	0	1	0	0	0	1
9	India	0	0	1	0	0	1
9	Israel	1	0	0	0	0	1
9	Switzerland	0	1	0	0	0	1
9	United States	0	0	1	0	0	1
15	Canada	0	0	0.5	0	0	0.5
15	Jamaica	0	0	0.5	0	0	0.5
Total		8	8	8	8	8	40

=== Perú Future Series ===
As of the 2026 edition

Pos	Nation	MS	WS	MD	WD	XD	Total
1	Peru	0	3	1	4	4	12
2	Canada	2	0	1	0	0	3
3	Cuba	0	1	1	0	0	2
3	Japan	1	1	0	0	0	2
5	Brazil	0	0	0	1	0	1
5	Guatemala	0	0	1	0	0	1
5	Indonesia	1	0	0	0	0	1
5	Mexico	1	0	0	0	0	1
5	United States	0	0	0	0	1	1
10	England	0	0	0.5	0	0	0.5
10	Jamaica	0	0	0.5	0	0	0.5
Total		5	5	5	5	5	25
