= Paula la Torre =

Peruvian badminton player

Personal information
- Full name: Paula Lucía la Torre Regal
- Born: 15 April 1999 (age 27) Lima, Peru
- Height: 1.73 m (5 ft 8 in)
- Weight: 60 kg (132 lb)

Sport
- Country: Peru
- Sport: Badminton

Women's singles & doubles
- Highest ranking: 133 (WS 15 March 2018); 67 (WD with Inés Castillo 27 December 2022); 100 (XD with Diego Mini 24 January 2023)
- BWF profile
Medal record
Women's badminton
Representing Peru
Pan Am Championships
| Silver medal – second place | 2016 Campinas | Women's doubles |
| Bronze medal – third place | 2016 Campinas | Mixed team |
| Bronze medal – third place | 2017 Havana | Women's doubles |
| Bronze medal – third place | 2018 Guatemala City | Women's doubles |
South American Games
| Silver medal – second place | 2018 Cochabamba | Mixed team |
| Silver medal – second place | 2022 Asunción | Mixed team |
| Bronze medal – third place | 2018 Cochabamba | Women's singles |
| Bronze medal – third place | 2018 Cochabamba | Women's doubles |
| Bronze medal – third place | 2022 Asunción | Women's doubles |
| Bronze medal – third place | 2022 Asunción | Mixed doubles |
Pan Am Junior Championships
| Bronze medal – third place | 2016 Lima | Girls' doubles |

Paula Lucía la Torre Regal (Note: In this Spanish name, the first or paternal surname is La Torre and the second or maternal family name is Regal.) (born 15 April 1999) is a Peruvian badminton player.

== Career ==
In 2016, she won the silver medal at the Pan Am Badminton Championships in the women's doubles event partnered with Luz Maria Zornoza, they were defeated by Michelle Tong and Josephine Wu in the final round. She also competed at the 2016 BWF World Junior Championships and reached the second round.

== Achievements ==
=== Pan Am Championships ===
Women's doubles
| Year | Venue | Partner | Opponent | Score | Result |
|---|---|---|---|---|---|
| 2016 | Clube Fonte São Paulo; Campinas, Brazil | (Peru) Luz María Zornoza | (Canada) Michelle Tong (Canada) Josephine Wu | 17–21, 17–21 | Silver |
| 2017 | Sports City Coliseum; Havana, Cuba | (Peru) Daniela Zapata | (Canada) Michelle Tong (Canada) Josephine Wu | 14–21, 13–21 | Bronze |
| 2018 | Teodoro Palacios Flores Gymnasium; Guatemala City, Guatemala | (Peru) Inés Castillo | (Canada) Rachel Honderich (Canada) Kristen Tsai | 10–21, 12–21 | Bronze |

=== South American Games ===
Women's singles
| Year | Venue | Opponent | Score | Result |
|---|---|---|---|---|
| 2018 | Evo Morales Coliseum; Cochabamba, Bolivia | (Peru) Daniela Macías | 8–21, 11–21 | Bronze |

Women's doubles
| Year | Venue | Partner | Opponent | Score | Result |
|---|---|---|---|---|---|
| 2018 | Evo Morales Coliseum; Cochabamba, Bolivia | (Peru) Inés Castillo | (Brazil) Luana Vicente (Brazil) Fabiana Silva | 9–21, 11–21 | Bronze |
| 2022 | Estadio León Condou; Asunción, Paraguay | (Peru) Inés Castillo | (Brazil) Sânia Lima (Brazil) Juliana Vieira | 14–21, 16–21 | Bronze |

Mixed doubles
| Year | Venue | Partner | Opponent | Score | Result |
|---|---|---|---|---|---|
| 2022 | Estadio León Condou; Asunción, Paraguay | (Peru) Diego Mini | (Brazil) Davi Silva (Brazil) Sânia Lima | 13–21, 20–22 | Bronze |

=== Pan Am Junior Championships ===
Girls' doubles
| Year | Venue | Partner | Opponent | Score | Result |
|---|---|---|---|---|---|
| 2016 | CAR lla Videna; Lima, Peru | (Peru) Inés Castillo | (Brazil) Jackeline Luz (Brazil) Amanda Santos | 15–21, 20–22 | Bronze |

=== BWF International Challenge/Series (3 titles, 7 runners-up) ===
Women's doubles
| Year | Tournament | Partner | Opponent | Score | Result |
|---|---|---|---|---|---|
| 2017 | Peru International Series | (Peru) Inés Castillo | (Peru) Daniela Macias (Peru) Dánica Nishimura | 12–21, 10–21 | (silver) Runner-up |
| 2018 | Jamaica International | (Peru) Inés Castillo | (United States) Jamie Hsu (United States) Jamie Subandhi | 15–21, 8–21 | (silver) Runner-up |
| 2018 | Perú Future Series | (Peru) Inés Castillo | (Peru) Daniela Macías (Peru) Dánica Nishimura | 16–21, 10–21 | (silver) Runner-up |
| 2018 | Peru International | (Peru) Inés Castillo | (Peru) Daniela Macías (Peru) Dánica Nishimura | 11–21, 10–21 | (silver) Runner-up |
| 2019 | Giraldilla International | (Peru) Inés Castillo | (Peru) Daniela Macías (Peru) Dánica Nishimura | 9–21, 11–21 | (silver) Runner-up |
| 2020 | Perú Future Series | (Peru) Inés Castillo | (Peru) Daniela Macías (Peru) Dánica Nishimura | 19–21, 22–20, 19–21 | (silver) Runner-up |
| 2023 | Perú Future Series | (Peru) Inés Castillo | (Peru) Fernanda Munar (Peru) Rafaela Munar | 21–14, 21–14 | (gold) Winner |

Mixed doubles
| Year | Tournament | Partner | Opponent | Score | Result |
|---|---|---|---|---|---|
| 2018 | Perú Future Series | (Peru) Diego Mini | (Peru) Daniel la Torre (Peru) Dánica Nishimura | 18–21, 21–15, 10–21 | (silver) Runner-up |
| 2020 | Perú Future Series | (Peru) Daniel la Torre | (Peru) Santiago de la Oliva (Peru) Inés Mendoza | 21–16, 21–18 | (gold) Winner |
| 2023 | Perú Future Series | (Peru) Diego Mini | (Peru) José Guevara (Peru) Inés Castillo | 21–17, 21–13 | (gold) Winner |

BWF International Challenge tournament
BWF International Series tournament
BWF Future Series tournament
