= Kristen Tsai =

Canadian badminton player (born 1995)

Kristen Tsai 蔡宛廷
Personal information
- Born: Tsai Wan-ting; 11 July 1995 (age 31) Taiwan
- Height: 1.67 m (5 ft 6 in)
- Weight: 62 kg (137 lb)

Sport
- Country: Canada
- Sport: Badminton
- Handedness: Right

Women's singles & doubles
- Highest ranking: 18 (WD with Rachel Honderich 15 November 2022); 59 (XD 24 September 2019 with Nyl Yakura)
- Current ranking: 24 (WD with Rachel Honderich 3 January 2023)
- BWF profile
Medal record
Women's badminton
Representing Canada
Pan American Games
Gold medal – first place	2019 Lima	Women's doubles
Silver medal – second place	2019 Lima	Mixed doubles
Pan Am Championships
Gold medal – first place	2012 Lima	Women's singles
Gold medal – first place	2018 Guatemala City	Women's doubles
Gold medal – first place	2019 Aguascalientes	Women's doubles
Gold medal – first place	2021 Guatemala City	Women's doubles
Gold medal – first place	2022 San Salvador	Women's doubles
Silver medal – second place	2012 Lima	Women's doubles
Silver medal – second place	2018 Guatemala City	Mixed doubles
Bronze medal – third place	2019 Aguascalientes	Mixed doubles
Pan Am Mixed Team Championships
Gold medal – first place	2012 Lima	Mixed team
Pan Am Women's Team Championships
Gold medal – first place	2020 Salvador	Women's team
Pan Am Junior Championships
Bronze medal – third place	2009 Guaynabo	Girls' doubles
Bronze medal – third place	2009 Guaynabo	Mixed team

Kristen Tsai (born 11 July 1995) is a Taiwanese born Canadian badminton player. She is the women's doubles champion at the 2019 Pan American Games, fifth time Pan Am Champion winning the women's singles title in 2012, and then the women's doubles title in 2018, 2019, 2021, and 2022.

== Career ==
Tsai became the first Canadian ever to make in to the quarterfinals at the World Junior Championships. Lived in Vancouver, British Columbia, she trained at the ClearOne badminton club, and majored in criminology at the Simon Fraser University. She won her first Pan Am Championships title in 2012 in the women's singles event, and after that Tsai spent a full 4 years – between the 2013 and 2017 Canada Opens – away from international competition. In 2018, she competed at the Commonwealth Games in Gold Coast, Australia. She won gold medal at the Pan American Games in the women's doubles partnered with Rachel Honderich, and a silver medal in the mixed doubles with Nyl Yakura in 2019 Lima.

In 2021, she captured her fourth Pan Am Championships title by winning the women's doubles event partnered with Rachel Honderich.

In June 2021, Tsai was named to Canada's Olympic team.

In December 2022, Tsai suffered an ACL and MCL rupture while competing in the S/J league in Japan. She had ACL reconstruction surgery in March 2023.

== Achievements ==
=== Pan American Games ===
Women's doubles
Year	Venue	Partner	Opponent	Score	Result
2019	Polideportivo 3 Lima, Peru	(Canada) Rachel Honderich	(United States) Keui-Ya Chen (United States) Jamie Hsu	21–10, 21–9	Gold

Mixed doubles
Year	Venue	Partner	Opponent	Score	Result
2019	Polideportivo 3, Lima, Peru	(Canada) Nyl Yakura	(Canada) Joshua Hurlburt-Yu (Canada) Josephine Wu	21–18, 12–21, 15–21	Silver

=== Pan Am Championships ===
Women's singles
Year	Venue	Opponent	Score	Result
2012	Manuel Bonilla Stadium, Lima, Peru	(United States) Jamie Subandhi	21–16, 21–19	Gold

Women's doubles
Year	Venue	Partner	Opponent	Score	Result
2012	Manuel Bonilla Stadium, Lima, Peru	(Canada) Joycelyn Ko	(Canada) Alex Bruce (Canada) Phyllis Chan	21–17, 17–21, 12–21	Silver
2018	Teodoro Palacios Flores Gymnasium, Guatemala City, Guatemala	(Canada) Rachel Honderich	(Canada) Michelle Tong (Canada) Josephine Wu	17–21, 21–17, 21–14	Gold
2019	Gimnasio Olímpico, Aguascalientes, Mexico	(Canada) Rachel Honderich	(Canada) Catherine Choi (Canada) Josephine Wu	21–15, 27–25	Gold
2021	Sagrado Corazon de Jesus, Guatemala City, Guatemala	(Canada) Rachel Honderich	(United States) Francesca Corbett (United States) Alison Lee	21–12, 21–7	Gold
2022	Palacio de los Deportes Carlos "El Famoso" Hernández; San Salvador, El Salvador	(Canada) Rachel Honderich	(Canada) Catherine Choi (Canada) Josephine Wu	21–17, 21–18	Gold

Mixed doubles
Year	Venue	Partner	Opponent	Score	Result
2018	Teodoro Palacios Flores Gymnasium, Guatemala City, Guatemala	(Canada) Nyl Yakura	(Canada) Ty Alexander Lindeman (Canada) Josephine Wu	14–21, 24–26	Silver
2019	Gimnasio Olímpico, Aguascalientes, Mexico	(Canada) Nyl Yakura	(Brazil) Fabrício Farias (Brazil) Jaqueline Lima	22–24, 19–21	Bronze

=== Pan Am Junior Championships ===
Girls' doubles
Year	Venue	Partner	Opponent	Score	Result
2009	Guaynabo, Puerto Rico	(Canada) Sarah Kong	(Peru) Lorena Duany (Peru) Katherine Winder	18–21, 13–21	Bronze

=== BWF International Challenge/Series (7 titles, 5 runners-up) ===
Women's singles
Year	Tournament	Opponent	Score	Result
2013	Peru International	(Canada) Nicole Grether	21–11, 21–12	(gold) Winner
2013	Canadian International	(Canada) Michelle Li	14–21, 19–21	(silver) Runner-up

Women's doubles
Year	Tournament	Partner	Opponent	Score	Result
2013	Peru International	(Canada) Joycelyn Ko	(Canada) Grace Gao (Canada) Michelle Li	15–21, 18–21	(silver) Runner-up
2017	Yonex / K&D Graphics International	(Canada) Rachel Honderich	(Australia) Leanne Choo (Australia) Renuga Veeran	21–12, 21–15	(gold) Winner
2018	Yonex / K&D Graphics International	(Canada) Rachel Honderich	(Chinese Taipei) Hung Shih-han (Chinese Taipei) Yu Chien-hui	21–19, 21–15	(gold) Winner
2019	Brazil International	(Canada) Rachel Honderich	(France) Émilie Lefel (France) Anne Tran	21–18, 17–21, 21–19	(gold) Winner
2019	Kharkiv International	(Canada) Rachel Honderich	(England) Chloe Birch (England) Lauren Smith	14–21, 18–21	(silver) Runner-up
2019	Belgian International	(Canada) Rachel Honderich	(Bulgaria) Gabriela Stoeva (Bulgaria) Stefani Stoeva	16–21, 15–21	(silver) Runner-up
2019	Hungarian International	(Canada) Rachel Honderich	(Sweden) Emma Karlsson (Sweden) Johanna Magnusson	21–16, 21–16	(gold) Winner
2019	Yonex / K&D Graphics International	(Canada) Rachel Honderich	(Australia) Setyana Mapasa (Australia) Gronya Somerville	21–14, 9–21, 18–21	(silver) Runner-up
2021	Scottish Open	(Canada) Rachel Honderich	(Malaysia) Anna Cheong (Malaysia) Teoh Mei Xing	21–14, 21-12	(gold) Winner

Mixed doubles
Year	Tournament	Partner	Opponent	Score	Result
2017	Yonex / K&D Graphics International	(Canada) Nyl Yakura	(New Zealand) Oliver Leydon-Davis (New Zealand) Susannah Leydon-Davis	21–11, 21–8	(gold) Winner

BWF International Challenge tournament
BWF International Series tournament
BWF Future Series tournament
