= Maurício Torres =

Brazilian journalist (1971–2014)

- Born: February 14, 1971; Rio de Janeiro, Brazil
- Died: May 31, 2014 (aged 43); São Paulo, Brazil
- Occupation: Sports journalist
- Spouse: Susana Naspolini (m. 2002–2014)
- Children: 1

Maurício Thomé Torres, better known as Maurício Torres (February 14, 1971 – May 31, 2014), was a Brazilian sports journalist. Torres covered three World Cups: 1994, in United States (he narrated by SporTV), 1998, in France and 2002 in South Korea and Japan (the two latter by TV Globo).

== Career ==
Torres worked on the Sistema Globo de Rádio and in the 90s, he narrated matches to the channels Globosat. In 1996, Torres joined to TV Globo, where he did sport transmissions (he did olympic events, in addition to be eventual in the transmissions of matches of the teams of Rio de Janeiro) and presented the sport segment of the newscast Bom Dia Brasil and sporadically Globo Esporte and Esporte Espetacular - in addition of Espaço Aberto Esporte, from GloboNews.

In 2005, Torres received an invitation and was to Record, where he presented sports programs in the station (Esporte Record, Esporte Fantástico and Esporte Record News - the latter on Record News) and participated of the sport transmissions (Brazilian Soccer, precisally matches of the teams of Rio de Janeiro, European Soccer and olympic events).

== Death ==
Torres dead on May 31, 2014, at the age of 43, after being hospitalizes during a month since May 1 on the Hospital Sírio-Libanês, after having passed bad in a flight between Rio de Janeiro and São Paulo. Upon disembarking, he was taken to the hospital, where a cardiac arrhythmia was diagnosed. His condition worsened following a pulmonary infection that did not respond to treatment, leading to his death.

Torres left his wife, the reporter of TV Globo, Susana Naspolini (December 20, 1972 - October 25, 2022) and a daughter.
