= Diego Castillo (badminton) =

Chilean badminton player (born 2001)

Personal information
- Born: Diego Antonio Castillo Méndez; 18 January 2001 (age 25)

Sport
- Country: Chile
- Sport: Badminton

Men's singles & doubles
- Highest ranking: 467 (MS 28 April 2016); 562 (MD 4 February 2016); 720 (XD 22 September 2016)
- BWF profile

Diego Antonio Castillo Méndez (born 18 January 2001) is a Chilean badminton player. In 2016, he won the Chile International tournament in men's doubles event partnered with Alonso Medel.

== Achievements ==
=== BWF International Challenge/Series ===
Men's doubles

Year	Tournament	Partner	Opponent	Score	Result
2016	Chile International	(Chile) Alonso Medel	(Chile) Iván León (Chile) Bastián Lizama	13–21, 22–20, 21–17	(gold) Winner

BWF International Challenge tournament
BWF International Series tournament
BWF Future Series tournament
