= Serafín Zayas =

Argentine badminton player (born 1996)

Personal information
- Born: 30 January 1996 (age 30) Neuquén, Neuquén, Argentina

Sport
- Country: Argentina
- Sport: Badminton

Men's singles & doubles
- Highest ranking: 567 (MS 25 February 2016); 315 (MD 21 April 2016); 597 (XD 12 May 2016)
- BWF profile

Serafín Zayas (born 30 January 1996) is an Argentine badminton player. He was the gold medalists at the 2013 South American Youth Games in the mixed doubles event partnered with Lohaynny Vicente of Brazil. Zayas competed at the 2018 South American Games.

== Achievements ==
=== BWF International Challenge/Series ===
Men's singles
Year	Tournament	Opponent	Score	Result
2016	Argentina International	(Argentina) Dino Delmastro	17–21, 19–21	(silver) Runner-up

BWF International Challenge tournament
BWF International Series tournament
BWF Future Series tournament
