= Luana Vicente =

Brazilian badminton player (born 1994)

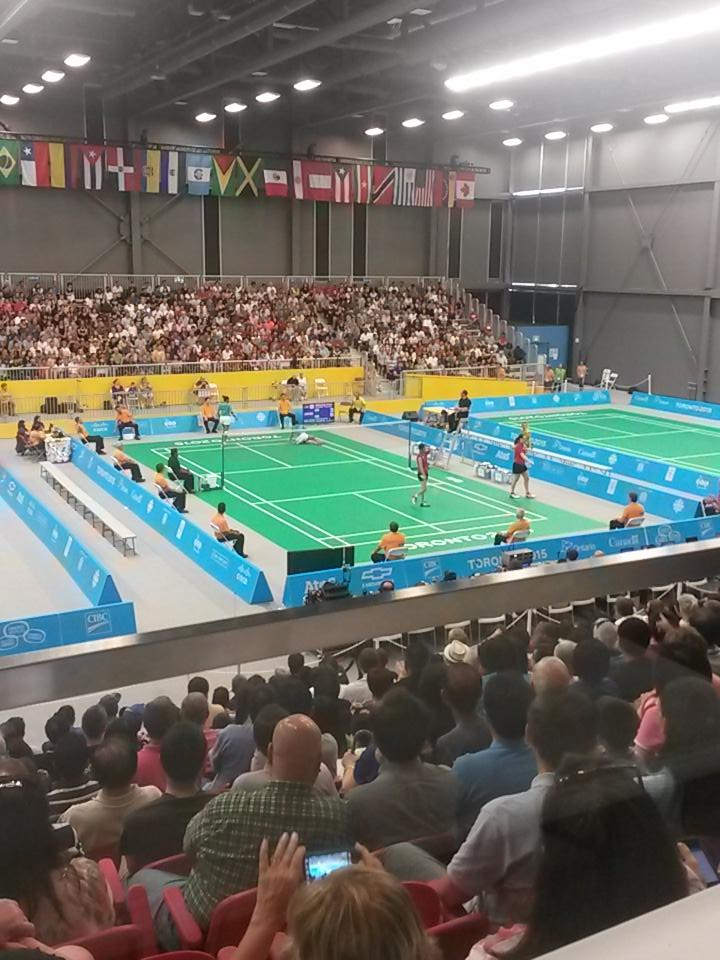

Personal information
- Born: Luana Tamara de Oliveira Vicente; 30 January 1994 (age 32) Rio de Janeiro, Brazil
- Height: 1.68 m (5 ft 6 in)
- Weight: 67 kg (148 lb)

Sport
- Country: Brazil
- Sport: Badminton
- Handedness: Right

Women's singles & doubles
- Highest ranking: 131 (WS 5 April 2012); 35 (WD 8 July 2016); 74 (XD 1 September 2016)
- BWF profile
Medal record
Women's badminton
Representing Brazil
Pan American Games
Silver medal – second place	2015 Toronto	Women's doubles
Pan American Championships
Silver medal – second place	2014 Markham	Women's doubles
Silver medal – second place	2016 Campinas	Mixed team
Bronze medal – third place	2014 Markham	Mixed team
Bronze medal – third place	2019 Lima	Mixed team
South American Games
Gold medal – first place	2018 Cochabamba	Mixed team
Silver medal – second place	2018 Cochabamba	Women's doubles
Silver medal – second place	2018 Cochabamba	Mixed doubles

Luana Tamara de Oliveira Vicente (born 30 January 1994) is a Brazilian badminton player who won a silver medal at the 2015 Pan American Games.

== Personal life ==
Vicente was born on 30 January 1994 in Rio de Janeiro, Brazil. Her younger sister Lohaynny Vicente is also an international badminton player. When Luana was six, her father, a drug dealer, was killed in a shootout with the police. Following her father's death, her mother moved the family from the west of the city to Chacrinha, a favela in the north of Rio. She now lives with her sister in Campinas, São Paulo, in a house funded by the Brazilian Badminton Federation.

== Career ==
Both Vicente and her sister began playing badminton through a programme set up by a coach to teach the sport to kids in the community.

Vicente won a silver medal in the women's doubles at the 2015 Pan American Games held in Toronto, Ontario, Canada, playing alongside her sister . The pair defeated Daigenis Saturria and Bermary Polanco of the Dominican Republic in the quarterfinals then Alex Bruce and Phyllis Chan of Canada in the semifinals. In the final they lost to the American pairing of Eva Lee and Paula Lynn Obañana by a score of 14−21, 6−21, to finish as runners-up.

Vicente competed at the 2018 South American Games, winning the gold medal in the team event, and also the silver medals in the women's and mixed doubles event.

== Achievements ==
=== Pan American Games ===
Women's doubles
Year	Venue	Partner	Opponent	Score	Result
2015	Atos Markham Pan Am Centre; Toronto, Canada	(Brazil) Lohaynny Vicente	(United States) Eva Lee (United States) Paula Lynn Obañana	14–21, 6–21	Silver

=== Pan Am Championships ===
Women's doubles
Year	Venue	Partner	Opponent	Score	Result
2014	Markham Pan Am Centre; Markham, Canada	(Brazil) Lohaynny Vicente	(United States) Eva Lee (United States) Paula Lynn Obañana	21–23, 14–21	Silver

=== South American Games ===
Women's doubles
Year	Venue	Partner	Opponent	Score	Result
2018	Evo Morales Coliseum; Cochabamba, Bolivia	(Brazil) Fabiana Silva	(Peru) Daniela Macías (Peru) Dánica Nishimura	20–22, 10–21	Silver

Mixed doubles
Year	Venue	Partner	Opponent	Score	Result
2018	Evo Morales Coliseum; Cochabamba, Bolivia	(Brazil) Artur Pomoceno	(Peru) Daniel la Torre Regal (Peru) Dánica Nishimura	17–21, 11–21	Silver

=== BWF International Challenge/Series ===
Women's singles
Year	Tournament	Opponent	Score	Result
2015	Carebaco International	(Brazil) Lohaynny Vicente	15–21, 18–21	(silver) Runner-up

Women's doubles
Year	Tournament	Partner	Opponent	Score	Result
2011	Carebaco International	(Brazil) Lohaynny Vicente	(Barbados) Mariama Eastmond (Barbados) Shari Watson	21–16, 21–11	(gold) Winner
2011	Miami International	(Brazil) Lohaynny Vicente	(United States) Dayanis Alvarez (United States) Shannon Pohl	21–9, 21–16	(gold) Winner
2011	Internacional Mexicano	(Brazil) Lohaynny Vicente	(Mexico) Cynthia González (Mexico) Victoria Montero	21–10, 21–19	(gold) Winner
2014	Mercosul International	(Brazil) Lohaynny Vicente	(Brazil) Paula Pereira (Brazil) Fabiana Silva	21–11, 21–13	(gold) Winner
2014	Argentina International	(Brazil) Lohaynny Vicente	(Brazil) Paula Pereira (Brazil) Fabiana Silva	18–21, 21–11, 21–15	(gold) Winner
2014	Venezuela International	(Brazil) Lohaynny Vicente	(Brazil) Paula Pereira (Brazil) Fabiana Silva	21–13, 21–5	(gold) Winner
2015	Peru International Series	(Brazil) Lohaynny Vicente	(Brazil) Paula Pereira (Brazil) Fabiana Silva	21–9, 21–17	(gold) Winner
2015	Chile International	(Brazil) Lohaynny Vicente	(Brazil) Paula Pereira (Brazil) Fabiana Silva	21–18, 21–15	(gold) Winner
2015	Internacional Mexicano	(Brazil) Lohaynny Vicente	(Mexico) Cynthia González (Mexico) Mariana Ugalde	21–8, 21–17	(gold) Winner
2015	Chile International Challenge	(Brazil) Lohaynny Vicente	(United States) Eva Lee (United States) Paula Lynn Obañana	17–21, 16–21	(silver) Runner-up
2018	International Mexicano	(Brazil) Lohaynny Vicente	(Peru) Daniela Macías (Peru) Dánica Nishimura	23–25, 21–16, 21–11	(gold) Winner
2018	Santo Domingo Open	(Brazil) Lohaynny Vicente	(Guatemala) Diana Corleto (Guatemala) Nikté Sotomayor	22–20, 21–17	(gold) Winner

Mixed doubles
Year	Tournament	Partner	Opponent	Score	Result
2015	Internacional Mexicano	(Brazil) Alex Yuwan Tjong	(Austria) David Obernosterer (Austria) Elisabeth Baldauf	17–21, 17–21	(silver) Runner-up
2015	Chile International Challenge	(Brazil) Alex Yuwan Tjong	(United States) Phillip Chew (United States) Jamie Subandhi	14–21, 14–21	(silver) Runner-up

BWF International Challenge tournament
BWF International Series tournament
BWF Future Series tournament
