= Bárbara María Berruezo =

Argentine badminton player (born 1985)

Bárbara Berruezo
Personal information
- Born: Bárbara María Berruezo; 16 January 1985 (age 41) Salta, Salta, Argentina
- Height: 1.61 m (5 ft 3 in)
- Weight: 57 kg (126 lb)

Sport
- Country: Argentina
- Sport: Badminton

Women's singles & doubles
- Highest ranking: 302 (WS 3 December 2015); 563 (WD 14 August 2014); 185 (XD 29 October 2015)
- BWF profile

Bárbara María Berruezo (born 16 January 1985) is an Argentine badminton player. She competed at the 2015 Pan American Games in Toronto, Canada, and 2018 South American Games in Cochabamba, Bolivia.

== Achievements ==
=== BWF International Challenge/Series ===
Women's singles

| Year | Tournament | Opponent | Score | Result |
|---|---|---|---|---|
| 2016 | Argentina International | (Argentina) Daiana Garmendia | 18–21, 24–22, 21–9 | (gold) Winner |

Women's doubles

| Year | Tournament | Partner | Opponent | Score | Result |
|---|---|---|---|---|---|
| 2018 | Argentina International | (Argentina) Florencia Bernatene | (Argentina) Iona Gualdi (Argentina) Ailen Oliva | 21–13, 21–11 | (gold) Winner |

BWF International Challenge tournament
BWF International Series tournament
BWF Future Series tournament
