= Alonso Medel =

Chilean badminton player (born 2001)

Personal information
- Born: Alonso Ignacio Medel Araya; 19 December 2001 (age 24) Antofagasta, Chile
- Height: 1.73 m (5 ft 8 in)
- Weight: 80 kg (176 lb)

Sport
- Country: Chile
- Sport: Badminton

Men's singles & doubles
- Highest ranking: 219 (MS 6 December 2018); 271 (MD 21 December 2017); 358 (XD 30 August 2018)
- BWF profile

Alonso Ignacio Medel Araya (born 19 December 2001) is a Chilean badminton player. In 2016, he won the Chile International tournament in men's doubles event partnered with Diego Castillo and the runner-up in mixed doubles event partnered with Mickaela Skaric. He represented his country at the 2018 Summer Youth Olympics in Buenos Aires, Argentina.

== Achievements ==
=== BWF International Challenge/Series ===
Men's doubles

Year	Tournament	Partner	Opponent	Score	Result
2016	Chile International	(Chile) Diego Castillo	(Chile) Iván León (Chile) Bastián Lizama	13–21, 22–20, 21–17	(gold) Winner

Mixed doubles

Year	Tournament	Partner	Opponent	Score	Result
2016	Chile International	(Chile) Mickaela Skaric	(Chile) Iván León (Chile) Camila Macaya	7–21, 21–18, 13–21	(silver) Runner-up

BWF International Challenge tournament
BWF International Series tournament
BWF Future Series tournament
