= Dino Delmastro =

Argentine badminton player (born 1996)

Personal information
- Born: Dino Nicolás Delmastro; 21 February 1996 (age 30) Bariloche, Río Negro, Argentina
- Height: 1.83 m (6 ft 0 in)
- Weight: 72 kg (159 lb)

Sport
- Country: Argentina
- Sport: Badminton

Men's singles & doubles
- Highest ranking: 492 (MS 18 September 2014; 665 (MD 6 October 2016)
- BWF profile

Dino Nicolás Delmastro (born 21 February 1996) is an Argentine badminton player. He competed at the 2018 South American Games. As a civil engineering student at the National University of Comahue, he competed at the 2015 Summer Universiade in Gwangju, South Korea.

== Achievements ==
=== BWF International Challenge/Series ===
Men's singles
Year	Tournament	Opponent	Score	Result
2016	Argentina International	(Argentina) Serafín Zayas	21–17, 21–19	(gold) Winner

Men's doubles
Year	Tournament	Partner	Opponent	Score	Result
2016	Argentina International	(Argentina) Mateo Delmastro	(Argentina) Javier de Paepe (Argentina) Martin Trejo	21–19, 18–21, 11–21	(silver) Runner-up

BWF International Challenge tournament
BWF International Series tournament
BWF Future Series tournament
