= Daniela Macías =

Peruvian badminton player

Personal information
- Born: Daniela Macías Brandes; 9 October 1997 (age 29) Lima, Peru
- Years active: 2010
- Height: 1.69 m (5 ft 7 in)
- Weight: 57 kg (126 lb)

Sport
- Country: Peru
- Sport: Badminton
- Handedness: Right

Women's singles & doubles
- Highest ranking: 72 (WS 8 March 2018); 41 (WD 19 October 2017); 75 (XD 16 July 2015)
- BWF profile
Medal record
Women's badminton
Representing Peru
Pan Am Championships
Silver medal – second place	2017 Havana	Women's doubles
Bronze medal – third place	2013 Santo Domingo	Women's doubles
Bronze medal – third place	2016 Campinas	Women's singles
Bronze medal – third place	2016 Campinas	Women's doubles
Bronze medal – third place	2016 Campinas	Mixed team
Pan Am Women's Team Championships
Bronze medal – third place	2018 Tacarigua	Women's team
South American Games
Gold medal – first place	2018 Cochabamba	Women's doubles
Silver medal – second place	2018 Cochabamba	Women's singles
Silver medal – second place	2018 Cochabamba	Mixed team

Daniela Macías Brandes (Note: This name uses Portuguese naming customs: the first or maternal family name is Macías and the second or paternal family name is Brandes.) (Spanish pronunciation: [daˈnjela maˈsi.as]; born 9 October 1997) is a Peruvian badminton player.

== Career ==
In 2013, she won the bronze medal at the Pan Am Championships in the women's doubles partnering with Dánica Nishimura, then in 2016, she won the bronze medals in the women's singles, doubles and mixed team event.

In 2013, she also won two gold medals at the XVII Bolivarian Games in the women's singles and in the mixed team event, and a bronze medal in the women's doubles partnering with Camila García. Then, in 2017, she won three gold medals at the XVIII Bolivarian Games in the women's singles, in the women's doubles partnering with Dánica Nishimura and in the mixed doubles with Mario Cuba. She also won a silver medal in the mixed team event.

Daniela is 36 times Peruvian national champion. She won 1 silver medal and 4 bronze medals in Pan Am Championships as well as 2 gold, 1 silver and 8 bronze medals in Junior Pan Am Championships. She is also 10 times South American Singles Champion and 10 times in the women doubles and mixed events. .

In 2014, she competed at the Nanjing Youth Olympic Games.

Daniela qualified and competed in the Women Singles event in the Tokyo 2020 Olympic Games.

== Achievements ==
=== Pan Am Championships ===
Women's singles
Year	Venue	Opponent	Score	Result
2016	Clube Fonte São Paulo; Campinas, Brazil	(Canada) Stéphanie Pakenham	18–21, 17–21	Bronze

Women's doubles
Year	Venue	Partner	Opponent	Score	Result
2013	Palacio de los Deportes Virgilio Travieso Soto; Santo Domingo, Dominican Republic	(Peru) Dánica Nishimura	(Canada) Alex Bruce (Canada) Phyllis Chan	5–21, 15–21	Bronze
2016	Clube Fonte São Paulo; Campinas, Brazil	(Peru) Dánica Nishimura	(Canada) Michelle Tong (Canada) Josephine Wu	17–21, 19–21	Bronze
2017	Sports City Coliseum; Havana, Cuba	(Peru) Dánica Nishimura	(Canada) Michelle Tong (Canada) Josephine Wu	11–21, 12–21	Silver

=== South American Games ===
Women's singles
Year	Venue	Opponent	Score	Result
2018	Evo Morales Coliseum; Cochabamba, Bolivia	(Brazil) Fabiana Silva	13–21, 20–22	Silver

Women's doubles
Year	Venue	Partner	Opponent	Score	Result
2018	Evo Morales Coliseum; Cochabamba, Bolivia	(Peru) Dánica Nishimura	(Brazil) Fabiana Silva (Brazil) Luana Vicente	22–20, 21–10	Gold

=== BWF International Challenge/Series (27 titles, 24 runners-up) ===
Women's singles
Year	Tournament	Opponent	Score	Result
2013	Giraldilla International	(Peru) Camilla García	15–21, 21–18, 12–21	(silver) Runner-up
2013	Guatemala International	(Dominican Republic) Berónica Vibieca	17–21, 15–21	(silver) Runner-up
2014	Colombia International	(Portugal) Telma Santos	5–11, 6–11, 3–11	(silver) Runner-up
2014	Suriname International	(Peru) Dánica Nishimura	21–16, 21–12	(gold) Winner
2016	Giraldilla International	(Austria) Elisabeth Baldauf	11–21, 14–21	(silver) Runner-up
2017	Peru International Series	(Peru) Daniela Zapata	21–12, 21–7	(gold) Winner
2017	Yonex / K&D Graphics International	(United States) Jamie Hsu	14–21, 12–21	(silver) Runner-up
2017	Carebaco International	(United States) Jamie Subandhi	22–20, 23–25, 9–21	(silver) Runner-up
2017	Guatemala International	(Cuba) Tahimara Oropeza	21–16, 22–20	(gold) Winner
2018	Jamaica International	(United States) Jamie Hsu	20–22, 8–21	(silver) Runner-up
2018	Peru Future Series	(Brazil) Fabiana Silva	21–14, 16–21, 21–17	(gold) Winner
2018	Suriname International	(Belgium) Lianne Tan	10–21, 6–21	(silver) Runner-up
2018	El Salvador International	(Brazil) Fabiana Silva	21–16, 21–14	(gold) Winner
2019	Giraldilla International	(Wales) Jordan Hart	17–21, 16–21	(silver) Runner-up
2019	Benin International	(Myanmar) Thet Htar Thuzar	21–17, 18–21, 14–21	(silver) Runner-up
2019	El Salvador International	(Mexico) Haramara Gaitan	21–16, 14–21, 21–14	(gold) Winner
2020	Peru Future Series	(Japan) Momoka Kimura	14–21, 19–21	(silver) Runner-up

Women's doubles
Year	Tournament	Partner	Opponent	Score	Result
2011	Colombia International	(Peru) Dánica Nishimura	(Puerto Rico) Daneysha Santana (Peru) Luz María Zornoza	12–21, 12–21	(silver) Runner-up
2012	Giraldilla International	(Peru) Luz María Zornoza	(Cuba) Mislenis Chaviano (Cuba) Maria L. Hernández	16–21, 21–19, 21–14	(gold) Winner
2012	Brazil International	(Peru) Camilla García	(Canada) Nicole Grether (Canada) Charmaine Reid	6–21, 15–21	(silver) Runner-up
2013	Giraldilla International	(Peru) Luz María Zornoza	(Peru) Camilla García (Peru) Dánica Nishimura	21–17, 18–21, 20–22	(silver) Runner-up
2013	Argentina International	(Peru) Luz María Zornoza	(Brazil) Paula Pereira (Brazil) Lohaynny Vicente	11–21, 11–21	(silver) Runner-up
2014	Colombia International	(Peru) Dánica Nishimura	(Peru) Katherine Winder (Peru) Luz María Zornoza	6–11, 10–11, 6–11	(silver) Runner-up
2014	Suriname International	(Peru) Dánica Nishimura	(Peru) Katherine Winder (Peru) Luz María Zornoza	13–21, 14–21	(silver) Runner-up
2014	Santo Domingo Open	(Peru) Dánica Nishimura	(Dominican Republic) Berónica Vibieca (Dominican Republic) Daigenis Saturria	14–21, 21–18, 21–16	(gold) Winner
2015	Brazil International	(Peru) Dánica Nishimura	(Brazil) Lohaynny Vicente (Brazil) Luana Vicente	9–21, 11–21	(silver) Runner-up
2016	Giraldilla International	(Peru) Luz María Zornoza	(Cuba) Yuvisleydis Ramírez (Cuba) Adaivis Robinson	21–3, 21–6	(gold) Winner
2017	Peru International Series	(Peru) Dánica Nishimura	(Peru) Inés Castillo (Peru) Paula la Torre	21–12, 21–10	(gold) Winner
2017	Peru International	(Peru) Dánica Nishimura	(Brazil) Jaqueline Lima (Brazil) Sâmia Lima	21–19, 22–20	(gold) Winner
2017	Yonex / K&D Graphics International	(Peru) Dánica Nishimura	(United States) Annie Xu (United States) Kerry Xu	11–21, 12–21	(silver) Runner-up
2017	Carebaco International	(Peru) Dánica Nishimura	(Dominican Republic) Nairoby Jiménez (Dominican Republic) Licelott Sánchez	21–19, 21–12	(gold) Winner
2017	Internacional Mexicano	(Peru) Dánica Nishimura	(United States) Ariel Lee (United States) Sydney Lee	21–6, 21–6	(gold) Winner
2017	Guatemala International	(Peru) Dánica Nishimura	(Dominican Republic) Noemi Almonte (Dominican Republic) Bermary Polanco	21–12, 21–6	(gold) Winner
2018	Peru Future Series	(Peru) Dánica Nishimura	(Peru) Inés Castillo (Peru) Paula la Torre	21–16, 21–10	(gold) Winner
2018	Peru International	(Peru) Dánica Nishimura	(Peru) Inés Castillo (Peru) Paula la Torre	21–11, 21–10	(gold) Winner
2018	International Mexicano	(Peru) Dánica Nishimura	(Brazil) Lohaynny Vicente (Brazil) Luana Vicente	25–23, 16–21, 11–21	(silver) Runner-up
2018	Suriname International	(Peru) Dánica Nishimura	(Guatemala) Diana Corleto (Guatemala) Nikté Sotomayor	21–10, 21–12	(gold) Winner
2018	El Salvador International	(Peru) Dánica Nishimura	(Guatemala) Diana Corleto (Guatemala) Nikté Sotomayor	21–18, 21–14	(gold) Winner
2019	Giraldilla International	(Peru) Dánica Nishimura	(Peru) Inés Castillo (Peru) Paula la Torre	21–9, 21–11	(gold) Winner
2019	Peru Future Series	(Peru) Dánica Nishimura	(Guatemala) Diana Corleto (Guatemala) Nikté Sotomayor	17–21, 21–5, 21–14	(gold) Winner
2019	Benin International	(Peru) Dánica Nishimura	(Egypt) Doha Hany (Egypt) Hadia Hosny	21–19, 18–21, 21–12	(gold) Winner
2019	Guatemala International	(Peru) Dánica Nishimura	(Brazil) Jaqueline Lima (Brazil) Sâmia Lima	19–21, 13–21	(silver) Runner-up
2019	Bahrain International	(Peru) Dánica Nishimura	(Thailand) Suthinee Dansoonthornwong (Thailand) Kanyanat Sudchoeichom	18–21, 21–16, 21–17	(gold) Winner
2019	Algeria International	(Peru) Dánica Nishimura	(Egypt) Doha Hany (Egypt) Hadia Hosny	21–13, 21–10	(gold) Winner
2019	Suriname International	(Peru) Dánica Nishimura	(Barbados) Monyata Riviera (Barbados) Sabrina Scott	21–4, 21–7	(gold) Winner
2019	El Salvador International	(Peru) Dánica Nishimura	(Guatemala) Ana Lucía Albanés (Guatemala) Michele Barrios	21–14, 21–8	(gold) Winner
2020	Uganda International	(Peru) Dánica Nishimura	(India) Meghana Jakkampudi (India) Poorvisha S. Ram	17–21, 22–20, 14–21	(silver) Runner-up
2020	Jamaica International	(Peru) Dánica Nishimura	(Japan) Sayaka Hobara (Japan) Rena Miyaura	3–21, 7–21	(silver) Runner-up
2020	Peru Future Series	(Peru) Dánica Nishimura	(Peru) Inés Castillo (Peru) Paula la Torre	21–19, 20–22, 21–19	(gold) Winner

Mixed doubles
Year	Tournament	Partner	Opponent	Score	Result
2015	Colombia International	(Peru) Daniel la Torre	(Brazil) Alex Yuwan Tjong (Brazil) Fabiana Silva	19–21, 21–19, 14–21	(silver) Runner-up
2019	Giraldilla International	(Peru) Mario Cuba	(Peru) José Guevara (Peru) Inés Castillo	21–12, 21–19	(gold) Winner

BWF International Challenge tournament
BWF International Series tournament
BWF Future Series tournament
