= Artur Pomoceno =

Brazilian badminton player

Artur Silva Pomoceno
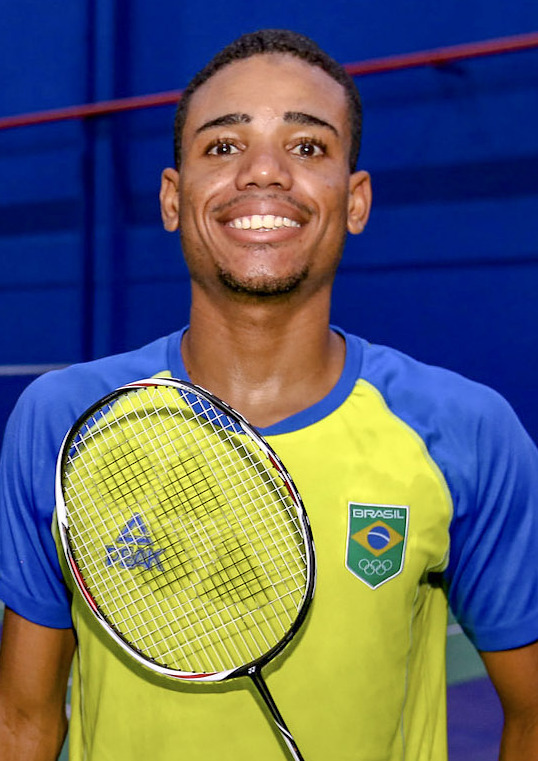
- Pomoceno in 2019

Personal information
- Born: Artur Silva de Pomoceno; 1 May 1997 (age 29) Rio de Janeiro, Brazil
- Height: 1.75 m (5 ft 9 in)

Sport
- Country: Brazil
- Sport: Badminton
- Handedness: Right

Men's singles & doubles
- Highest ranking: 119 (MS 20 August 2019); 271 (MD 21 December 2017); 90 (XD 4 October 2018)
- Current ranking: 172 (MS); 278 (MD) (26 April 2022)
- BWF profile
Medal record
Men's badminton
Representing Brazil
Pan Am Championships
Silver medal – second place	2016 Campinas	Men's singles
Pan Am Mixed Team Championships
Silver medal – second place	2016 Campinas	Mixed team
Silver medal – second place	2017 Santo Domingo	Mixed team
Bronze medal – third place	2019 Lima	Mixed team
Pan Am Male Cup
Silver medal – second place	2022 Acapulco	Men's team
Silver medal – second place	2024 São Paulo	Men's team
South American Games
Gold medal – first place	2018 Cochabamba	Men's doubles
Gold medal – first place	2018 Cochabamba	Mixed team
Silver medal – second place	2018 Cochabamba	Men's singles
Silver medal – second place	2018 Cochabamba	Mixed doubles
Pan Am Junior Championships
Silver medal – second place	2014 Guatemala City	Mixed team
Silver medal – second place	2015 Tijuana	Boys' singles
Silver medal – second place	2015 Tijuana	Mixed team
Bronze medal – third place	2014 Guatemala City	Boys' singles

Artur Silva de Pomoceno (born 1 May 1997) is a Brazilian badminton player.

== Career ==
Pomoceno started playing badminton in 2008 for the Rio de Janeiro social project. In 2013, he won the South America Badminton Championships, and in 2014 he was a runner-up. In 2014, he also won the bronze medal at the Pan Am Junior Badminton Championships in the boys' singles event, and in 2015 he won the silver medal. In 2016, he won the silver medal at the Pan Am Badminton Championships in the men's singles event. At the 2018 South American Games, Pomoceno claimed four medals, 2 golds in the men's doubles and team event; and 2 silvers in the men's singles and mixed doubles event.

== Achievements ==
=== Pan Am Championships ===
Men's singles
Year	Venue	Opponent	Score	Result
2016	Clube Fonte São Paulo; Campinas, Brazil	(Canada) Jason Ho-Shue	17–21, 11–21	Silver

=== South American Games ===
Men's singles
Year	Venue	Opponent	Score	Result
2018	Evo Morales Coliseum; Cochabamba, Bolivia	(Brazil) Ygor Coelho	21–19, 21–23, 12–21	Silver

Men's doubles
Year	Venue	Partner	Opponent	Score	Result
2018	Evo Morales Coliseum; Cochabamba, Bolivia	(Brazil) Ygor Coelho	(Peru) Bruno Barrueto (Peru) Diego Mini	23–21, 21–18	Gold

Mixed doubles
Year	Venue	Partner	Opponent	Score	Result
2018	Evo Morales Coliseum; Cochabamba, Bolivia	(Brazil) Luana Vicente	(Peru) Daniel la Torre (Peru) Dánica Nishimura	17–21, 11–21	Silver

=== Pan Am Junior Championships ===
Boys' singles
Year	Venue	Opponent	Score	Result
2014	Guatemala City, Guatemala	(United States) Timothy Lam	13–21, 21–19, 19–21	Bronze
2015	Centro de Alto Rendimiento; Tijuana, Mexico	(Canada) Jason Ho-Shue	18–21, 11–21	Silver

=== BWF International Challenge/Series (5 titles, 5 runners-up) ===
Men's singles
Year	Tournament	Opponent	Score	Result
2019	Brazil Future Series	(Brazil) Donnians Oliveira	21–16, 21–23, 21–9	(gold) Winner

Men's doubles
Year	Tournament	Partner	Opponent	Score	Result
2021	Brazil International Series	(Brazil) Izak Batalha	(Brazil) Fabrício Farias (Brazil) Francielton Farias	18–21, 10–21	(silver) Runner-up
2021	Dominican Open	(Brazil) Izak Batalha	(Brazil) Fabrício Farias (Brazil) Francielton Farias	16–21, 12–21	(silver) Runner-up
2021	El Salvador International	(Brazil) Jonathan Matias	(Italy) Fabio Caponio (Italy) Giovanni Toti	21–11, 14–21, 21–17	(gold) Winner

Mixed doubles
Year	Tournament	Partner	Opponent	Score	Result
2017	Mercosul International	(Brazil) Fabiana Silva	(Guatemala) Aníbal Marroquín (Guatemala) Mariana Paiz	19–21, 21–18, 23–21	(gold) Winner
2018	Peru International	(Brazil) Fabiana Silva	(Cuba) Leodannis Martínez (Cuba) Tahimara Oropeza	26–24, 15–21, 21–8	(gold) Winner
2019	Jamaica International	(Brazil) Lohaynny Vicente	(United States) Vinson Chiu (United States) Breanna Chi	21–17, 14–21, 21–19	(gold) Winner
2019	Brazil Future Series	(Brazil) Sâmia Lima	(Brazil) Fabrício Farias (Brazil) Jaqueline Lima	17–21, 16–21	(silver) Runner-up
2021	Brazil International Series	(Brazil) Sâmia Lima	(Brazil) Fabrício Farias (Brazil) Jaqueline Lima	19–21, 12–21	(silver) Runner-up
2021	Dominican Open	(Brazil) Sâmia Lima	(Brazil) Fabrício Farias (Brazil) Jaqueline Lima	22–24, 19–21	(silver) Runner-up

BWF International Challenge tournament
BWF International Series tournament
BWF Future Series tournament
