= Dánica Nishimura =

Peruvian badminton player

Personal information
- Born: Dánica Nishimura Higa; 11 September 1996 (age 30) Lima, Peru
- Height: 1.62 m (5 ft 4 in)
- Weight: 55 kg (121 lb)

Sport
- Country: Peru
- Sport: Badminton
- Handedness: Right

Women's singles & doubles
- Highest ranking: 91 (WS 8 January 2015); 41 (WD 19 October 2017); 67 (XD 15 March 2018)
- BWF profile
Medal record
Women's badminton
Representing Peru
Pan Am Championships
Silver medal – second place	2017 Havana	Women's doubles
Bronze medal – third place	2013 Santo Domingo	Women's doubles
Bronze medal – third place	2016 Campinas	Women's doubles
Bronze medal – third place	2016 Campinas	Mixed team
Pan Am Women's Team Championships
Bronze medal – third place	2018 Tacarigua	Women's team
South American Games
Gold medal – first place	2018 Cochabamba	Women's doubles
Gold medal – first place	2018 Cochabamba	Mixed doubles
Silver medal – second place	2018 Cochabamba	Mixed team

Dánica Nishimura Higa (born 11 September 1996) is a Peruvian badminton player.

== Career ==
Nishimura started playing badminton at aged 10 in AELU club. In 2008 she competed in the junior event and at the same year, she joined the national team. In 2013, she won the bronze medal at the Pan Am Badminton Championships in women's doubles partnering with Daniela Macías, then in 2016, she won the bronze medals in the women's doubles and mixed team events.

Nishimura claimed two gold medals in the individual event at the 2018 South American Games in the women's and mixed doubles, and also helped the team clinch the silver medal.

== Achievements ==
=== Pan Am Championships ===
Women's doubles
Year	Venue	Partner	Opponent	Score	Result
2013	Palacio de los Deportes Virgilio Travieso Soto; Santo Domingo, Dominican Republic	(Peru) Daniela Macías	(Canada) Alex Bruce (Canada) Phyllis Chan	5–21, 15–21	Bronze
2016	Clube Fonte São Paulo; Campinas, Brazil	(Peru) Daniela Macías	(Canada) Michelle Tong (Canada) Josephine Wu	17–21, 19–21	Bronze
2017	Sports City Coliseum; Havana, Cuba	(Peru) Daniela Macías	(Canada) Michelle Tong (Canada) Josephine Wu	11–21, 12–21	Silver

=== South American Games ===
Women's doubles
Year	Venue	Partner	Opponent	Score	Result
2018	Evo Morales Coliseum; Cochabamba, Bolivia	(Peru) Daniela Macías	(Brazil) Fabiana Silva (Brazil) Luana Vicente	22–20, 21–10	Gold

Mixed doubles
Year	Venue	Partner	Opponent	Score	Result
2018	Evo Morales Coliseum; Cochabamba, Bolivia	(Peru) Daniel la Torre	(Brazil) Artur Pomoceno (Brazil) Luana Vicente	21–17, 21–11	Gold

=== BWF International Challenge/Series (23 titles, 13 runners-up) ===
Women's singles
Year	Tournament	Opponent	Score	Result
2014	Suriname International	(Peru) Daniela Macías	16–21, 12–21	(silver) Runner-up

Women's doubles
Year	Tournament	Partner	Opponent	Score	Result
2011	Colombia International	(Peru) Daniela Macías	(Puerto Rico) Daneysha Santana (Peru) Luz María Zornoza	12–21, 12–21	(silver) Runner-up
2013	Giraldilla International	(Peru) Camilla García	(Peru) Daniela Macías (Peru) Luz María Zornoza	17–21, 21–18, 22–20	(gold) Winner
2014	Giraldilla International	(Peru) Luz María Zornoza	(Peru) Camilla García (Peru) Daniela Zapata	21–15, 21–17	(gold) Winner
2014	Colombia International	(Peru) Daniela Macías	(Peru) Katherine Winder (Peru) Luz María Zornoza	6–11, 10–11, 6–11	(silver) Runner-up
2014	Suriname International	(Peru) Daniela Macías	(Peru) Katherine Winder (Peru) Luz María Zornoza	13–21, 14–21	(silver) Runner-up
2014	Santo Domingo Open	(Peru) Daniela Macías	(Dominican Republic) Berónica Vibieca (Dominican Republic) Daigenis Saturria	14–21, 21–18, 21–16	(gold) Winner
2015	Brazil International	(Peru) Daniela Macías	(Brazil) Lohaynny Vicente (Brazil) Luana Vicente	9–21, 11–21	(silver) Runner-up
2017	Peru International Series	(Peru) Daniela Macías	(Peru) Inés Castillo (Peru) Paula la Torre	21–12, 21–10	(gold) Winner
2017	Peru International	(Peru) Daniela Macías	(Brazil) Jaqueline Lima (Brazil) Sâmia Lima	21–19, 22–20	(gold) Winner
2017	Yonex / K&D Graphics International	(Peru) Daniela Macías	(United States) Annie Xu (United States) Kerry Xu	11–21, 12–21	(silver) Runner-up
2017	Carebaco International	(Peru) Daniela Macías	(Dominican Republic) Nairoby Jiménez (Dominican Republic) Licelott Sánchez	21–19, 21–12	(gold) Winner
2017	Internacional Mexicano	(Peru) Daniela Macías	(United States) Ariel Lee (United States) Sydney Lee	21–6, 21–6	(gold) Winner
2017	Guatemala International	(Peru) Daniela Macías	(Dominican Republic) Noemi Almonte (Dominican Republic) Bermary Polanco	21–12, 21–6	(gold) Winner
2018	Peru Future Series	(Peru) Daniela Macías	(Peru) Inés Castillo (Peru) Paula la Torre	21–16, 21–10	(gold) Winner
2018	Peru International	(Peru) Daniela Macías	(Peru) Inés Castillo (Peru) Paula la Torre	21–11, 21–10	(gold) Winner
2018	International Mexicano	(Peru) Daniela Macías	(Brazil) Lohaynny Vicente (Brazil) Luana Vicente	25–23, 16–21, 11–21	(silver) Runner-up
2018	Suriname International	(Peru) Daniela Macías	(Guatemala) Diana Corleto (Guatemala) Nikté Sotomayor	21–10, 21–12	(gold) Winner
2018	El Salvador International	(Peru) Daniela Macías	(Guatemala) Diana Corleto (Guatemala) Nikté Sotomayor	21–18, 21–14	(gold) Winner
2019	Jamaica International	(Peru) Inés Castillo	(United States) Breanna Chi (United States) Jennie Gai	11–21, 6–21	(silver) Runner-up
2019	Giraldilla International	(Peru) Daniela Macías	(Peru) Inés Castillo (Peru) Paula la Torre	21–9, 21–11	(gold) Winner
2019	Peru Future Series	(Peru) Daniela Macías	(Guatemala) Diana Corleto (Guatemala) Nikté Sotomayor	17–21, 21–5, 21–14	(gold) Winner
2019	Benin International	(Peru) Daniela Macías	(Egypt) Doha Hany (Egypt) Hadia Hosny	21–19, 18–21, 21–12	(gold) Winner
2019	Guatemala International	(Peru) Daniela Macías	(Brazil) Jaqueline Lima (Brazil) Sâmia Lima	19–21, 13–21	(silver) Runner-up
2019	Bahrain International	(Peru) Daniela Macías	(Thailand) Suthinee Dansoonthornwong (Thailand) Kanyanat Sudchoeichom	18–21, 21–16, 21–17	(gold) Winner
2019	Algeria International	(Peru) Daniela Macías	(Egypt) Doha Hany (Egypt) Hadia Hosny	21–13, 21–10	(gold) Winner
2019	Suriname International	(Peru) Daniela Macías	(Barbados) Monyata Riviera (Barbados) Sabrina Scott	21–4, 21–7	(gold) Winner
2019	El Salvador International	(Peru) Daniela Macías	(Guatemala) Ana Lucía Albanés (Guatemala) Michele Barrios	21–14, 21–8	(gold) Winner
2020	Uganda International	(Peru) Daniela Macías	(India) Meghana Jakkampudi (India) Poorvisha S. Ram	17–21, 22–20, 14–21	(silver) Runner-up
2020	Jamaica International	(Peru) Daniela Macías	(Japan) Sayaka Hobara (Japan) Rena Miyaura	3–21, 7–21	(silver) Runner-up
2020	Peru Future Series	(Peru) Daniela Macías	(Peru) Inés Castillo (Peru) Paula la Torre	21–19, 20–22, 21–19	(gold) Winner

Mixed doubles
Year	Tournament	Partner	Opponent	Score	Result
2017	Peru International Series	(Peru) Daniel la Torre	(Peru) Mario Cuba (Peru) Katherine Winder	18–21, 18–21	(silver) Runner-up
2017	Carebaco International	(Peru) Daniel la Torre	(Peru) Bruno Barrueto (Peru) Inés Castillo	21–16, 21–9	(gold) Winner
2017	Internacional Mexicano	(Peru) Daniel la Torre	(Cuba) Leodannis Martínez (Cuba) Tahimara Oropeza	21–19, 21–19	(gold) Winner
2018	Peru Future Series	(Peru) Daniel la Torre	(Peru) Diego Mini (Peru) Paula la Torre	21–18, 15–21, 21–10	(gold) Winner
2018	El Salvador International	(Guatemala) Aníbal Marroquín	(Canada) Brian Yang (Canada) Catherine Choi	6–21, 7–21	(silver) Runner-up

BWF International Challenge tournament
BWF International Series tournament
BWF Future Series tournament
