= Daniel la Torre Regal =

Peruvian badminton player (born 1997)

Personal information
- Born: 20 August 1997 (age 29) Lima, Peru
- Height: 1.81 m (5 ft 11 in)
- Weight: 63 kg (139 lb)

Sport
- Country: Peru
- Sport: Badminton
- Handedness: Right

Men's singles & doubles
- Highest ranking: 152 (MS 19 July 2018); 77 (MD 15 March 2018); 67 (XD 15 March 2018)
- BWF profile
Medal record
Men's badminton
Representing Peru
South American Games
Gold medal – first place	2018 Cochabamba	Mixed doubles
Silver medal – second place	2018 Cochabamba	Mixed team
Silver medal – second place	2022 Asunción	Men's doubles
Silver medal – second place	2022 Asunción	Mixed team
Bronze medal – third place	2018 Cochabamba	Men's singles
Bronze medal – third place	2018 Cochabamba	Men's doubles

Daniel la Torre Regal (born 20 August 1997) is a Peruvian badminton player.

== Career ==
In 2015, he was the mixed doubles runner-up at the South America U-19 Championships and also at the Colombia International tournament with Daniela Macías. In 2017, he teamed-up with Dánica Nishimura, started their success by becoming the runner-up at the Peru International Series. The duo won their first title together at the Carebaco International. He competed at the 2018 South American Games, winning a gold, a silver, and two bronze medals.

== Achievements ==
=== South American Games ===
Men's singles
Year	Venue	Opponent	Score	Result
2018	Evo Morales Coliseum; Cochabamba, Bolivia	(Brazil) Artur Pomoceno	18–21, 14–21	Bronze

Men's doubles
Year	Venue	Partner	Opponent	Score	Result
2018	Evo Morales Coliseum; Cochabamba, Bolivia	(Peru) José Guevara	(Brazil) Ygor Coelho (Brazil) Artur Pomoceno	15–21, 18–21	Bronze
2022	Estadio León Condou; Asunción, Paraguay	(Peru) Diego Subauste	(Brazil) Fabrício Farias (Brazil) Davi Silva	17–21, 13–21	Silver

Mixed doubles
Year	Venue	Partner	Opponent	Score	Result
2018	Evo Morales Coliseum; Cochabamba, Bolivia	(Peru) Dánica Nishimura	(Brazil) Artur Pomoceno (Brazil) Luana Vicente	21–17, 21–11	Gold

=== BWF International Challenge/Series (6 titles, 3 runners-up) ===
Men's doubles
Year	Tournament	Partner	Opponent	Score	Result
2018	Perú Future Series	(Peru) José Guevara	(Peru) Bruno Barrueto (Peru) Diego Subauste	21–18, 21–13	(gold) Winner
2019	Giraldilla International	(Peru) José Guevara	(Cuba) Ángel Herrera (Cuba) Leodannis Martínez	28–26, 21–18	(gold) Winner
2023	Perú Future Series	(Peru) Diego Subauste	(England) Kelvin Ho (Jamaica) Samuel Ricketts	17–21, 11–21	(silver) Runner-up

Mixed doubles
Year	Tournament	Partner	Opponent	Score	Result
2015	Colombia International	(Peru) Daniela Macías	(Brazil) Alex Yuwan Tjong (Brazil) Fabiana Silva	19–21, 21–19, 14–21	(silver) Runner-up
2017	Peru International Series	(Peru) Dánica Nishimura	(Peru) Mario Cuba (Peru) Katherine Winder	18–21, 18–21	(silver) Runner-up
2017	Carebaco International	(Peru) Dánica Nishimura	(Peru) Bruno Barrueto (Peru) Inés Castillo	21–16, 21–9	(gold) Winner
2017	Internacional Mexicano	(Peru) Dánica Nishimura	(Cuba) Leodannis Martinez (Cuba) Tahimara Oropeza	21–19, 21–19	(gold) Winner
2018	Perú Future Series	(Peru) Dánica Nishimura	(Peru) Diego Mini (Peru) Paula la Torre	21–18, 15–21, 21–10	(gold) Winner
2020	Perú Future Series	(Peru) Paula la Torre	(Peru) Santiago de la Oliva (Peru) Inés Mendoza	21–16, 21–18	(gold) Winner

BWF International Challenge tournament
BWF International Series tournament
BWF Future Series tournament
