= Diego Mini =

Peruvian badminton player (born 1999)

Personal information
- Born: Diego Mini Cuadros; 13 April 1999 (age 27) Lima, Peru
- Height: 1.78 m (5 ft 10 in)
- Weight: 76 kg (168 lb)

Sport
- Country: Peru
- Sport: Badminton

Men's singles & doubles
- Highest ranking: 211 (MS 23 April 2019); 96 (MD with Mario Cuba 19 April 2018); 100 (XD with Paula la Torre Regal 24 January 2023)
- BWF profile
Medal record
Men's badminton
Representing Peru
Pan Am Championships
Bronze medal – third place	2016 Campinas	Mixed doubles
Bronze medal – third place	2016 Campinas	Mixed team
Bronze medal – third place	2017 Havana	Men's doubles
South American Games
Silver medal – second place	2018 Cochabamba	Men's doubles
Silver medal – second place	2018 Cochabamba	Mixed team
Silver medal – second place	2022 Asunción	Mixed team
Bronze medal – third place	2022 Asunción	Men's doubles
Bronze medal – third place	2022 Asunción	Mixed doubles

Diego Mini Cuadros (born 13 April 1999) is a Peruvian badminton player. He won the bronze at the 2016 Pan Am Badminton Championships in the mixed doubles and team event. Teamed up with Zornoza, they lost in the semi-final round to Canadian pair with the score 0–2. He also the runner-up of the Peru International Series tournament partnered with Zornoza. He was the silver medallists at the 2018 South American Games in the men's doubles and mixed team event.

== Achievements ==
=== Pan Am Championships ===
Men's doubles
Year	Venue	Partner	Opponent	Score	Result
2017	Sports City Coliseum; Havana, Cuba	(Peru) Mario Cuba	(Canada) Jason Ho-Shue (Canada) Nyl Yakura	8–21, 14–21	Bronze

Mixed doubles
Year	Venue	Partner	Opponent	Score	Result
2016	Clube Fonte São Paulo; Campinas, Brazil	(Peru) Luz María Zornoza	(Canada) Nathan Osborne (Canada) Josephine Wu	22–24, 16–21	Bronze

=== South American Games ===
Men's doubles
Year	Venue	Partner	Opponent	Score	Result
2018	Evo Morales Coliseum; Cochabamba, Bolivia	(Peru) Bruno Barrueto Deza	(Brazil) Ygor Coelho (Brazil) Artur Pomoceno	21–23, 18–21	Silver
2022	Estadio León Condou; Asunción, Paraguay	(Peru) José Guevara	(Brazil) Fabrício Farias (Brazil) Davi Silva	12–21, 17–21	Bronze

Mixed doubles
Year	Venue	Partner	Opponent	Score	Result
2022	Estadio León Condou; Asunción, Paraguay	(Peru) Paula la Torre	(Brazil) Davi Silva (Brazil) Sânia Lima	13–21, 20–22	Bronze

=== BWF International Challenge/Series (1 title, 4 runners-up) ===
Men's doubles
Year	Tournament	Partner	Opponent	Score	Result
2017	Peru International	(Peru) Mario Cuba	(India) Alwin Francis (India) Tarun Kona	15–21, 15–21	(silver) Runner-up
2019	Perú Future Series	(Peru) Mario Cuba	(Cuba) Osleni Guerrero (Cuba) Leodannis Martínez	14–21, 17–21	(silver) Runner-up

Mixed doubles
Year	Tournament	Partner	Opponent	Score	Result
2016	Peru International Series	(Peru) Luz María Zornoza	(Peru) Mario Cuba (Peru) Katherine Winder	21–23, 12–21	(silver) Runner-up
2018	Perú Future Series	(Peru) Paula la Torre	(Peru) Daniel la Torre Regal (Peru) Dánica Nishimura	18–21, 21–15, 10–21	(silver) Runner-up
2023	Perú Future Series	(Peru) Paula la Torre	(Peru) José Guevara (Peru) Inés Castillo	21–17, 21–13	(gold) Winner

BWF International Challenge tournament
BWF International Series tournament
BWF Future Series tournament
