= 2023 Spain Masters =

Badminton tournament in Madrid

Tournament details
- Dates: 28 March – 2 April
- Edition: 5th
- Level: Super 300
- Total prize money: US$210,000
- Venue: Centro Deportivo Municipal Gallur
- Location: Madrid, Spain

Champions
- Men's singles: (Japan) Kenta Nishimoto
- Women's singles: (Indonesia) Gregoria Mariska Tunjung
- Men's doubles: (China) He Jiting (China) Zhou Haodong
- Women's doubles: (China) Liu Shengshu (China) Tan Ning
- Mixed doubles: (Denmark) Mathias Christiansen (Denmark) Alexandra Bøje

The 2023 Spain Masters (officially known as the Madrid Spain Masters 2023) was a badminton tournament which was held at the Centro Deportivo Municipal Gallur in Madrid, Spain, from 28 March to 2 April 2023 with a total prize of $210,000.

== Tournament ==
The 2023 Spain Masters was the ninth tournament of the 2023 BWF World Tour and also part of the Spain Masters championship, which had been held since 2018. This tournament was organized by the Spanish Badminton Federation and sanctioned by the BWF.

=== Venue ===
This international tournament was held at the Centro Deportivo Municipal Gallur in Madrid, Spain.

=== Point distribution ===
Below is the point distribution for each phase of the tournament based on the BWF points system for the BWF World Tour Super 300 event.

Winner	Runner-up	3/4	5/8	9/16	17/32	33/64	65/128
7,000	5,950	4,900	3,850	2,750	1,670	660	320

=== Prize money ===
The total prize money for this tournament was US$210,000. Distribution of prize money was in accordance with BWF regulations.

Event	Winner	Finals	Semi-finals	Quarter-finals	Last 16
Singles	$15,750	$7,980	$3,045	$1,260	$735
Doubles	$16,590	$7,980	$2,940	$1,522.50	$787.50

== Men's singles ==
=== Seeds ===
1. (Japan) Kenta Nishimoto (champion)
2. (Japan) Kanta Tsuneyama (final)
3. (Indonesia) Chico Aura Dwi Wardoyo (withdrew)
4. (Denmark) Anders Antonsen (semi-finals)
5. (India) Srikanth Kidambi (quarter-finals)
6. (Denmark) Rasmus Gemke (quarter-finals)
7. (Chinese Taipei) Wang Tzu-wei (first round)
8. (France) Toma Junior Popov (semi-finals)

=== Finals ===
Semi-finals
1	(Japan) Kenta Nishimoto	21	15	23
8	(France) Toma Junior Popov	10	21	21
4	(Denmark) Anders Antonsen	20	22	18
2	(Japan) Kanta Tsuneyama	22	20	21

Final
1	(Japan) Kenta Nishimoto	15	21	21
2	(Japan) Kanta Tsuneyama	21	18	19

=== Top half ===
==== Section 1 ====
First round
1	(Japan) K Nishimoto	21	23	21
(Chinese Taipei) Lee C-h	11	25	18
(France) A Merklé	21	21
(France) B Leverdez	15	14
5	(India) S Kidambi	21	25	23
(Thailand) S Thammasin	11	27	21
PFQ	(Czech Republic) J Louda	16	21	12
(India) B. Sai Praneeth	21	18	21

Second round
1	(Japan) K Nishimoto	w	/	o
(France) A Merklé
5	(India) S Kidambi	21	21
(India) B. Sai Praneeth	15	12

Quarter-finals
1	(Japan) K Nishimoto	21	21
5	(India) S Kidambi	18	15

==== Section 2 ====
First round
PFQ	(Spain) L E Peñalver	21	16	15
Q2	(Denmark) M Johannesen	16	21	21
(India) M Manjunath	16	14
PFQ	(India) K George	21	21
8	(France) T J Popov	21	16	21
(Chinese Taipei) Lin C-y	17	21	19
Q4	(India) P Rajawat	18	21	21
(Denmark) V Svendsen	21	16	11

Second round
Q2	(Denmark) M Johannesen	21	21
PFQ	(India) K George	17	12
8	(France) T J Popov	21	21
Q4	(India) P Rajawat	14	15

Quarter-finals
Q2	(Denmark) M Johannesen	17	17
8	(France) T J Popov	21	21

=== Bottom half ===
==== Section 3 ====
First round
(Guatemala) K Cordón	12	13
(France) C Popov	21	21
(Japan) K Watanabe	18	21	21
7	(Chinese Taipei) Wang T-w	21	10	12
(Israel) M Zilberman	21	21
Q1	(Brazil) J Matias	18	10
(Brazil) Y Coelho	13	17
4	(Denmark) A Antonsen	21	21

Second round
(France) C Popov	14	21
(Japan) K Watanabe	21	23
(Israel) M Zilberman	13	24	10
4	(Denmark) A Antonsen	21	22	21

Quarter-finals
(Japan) K Watanabe	17	22
4	(Denmark) A Antonsen	21	24

==== Section 4 ====
First round
Q3	(Indonesia) C Adinata	21	21
(Malaysia) Cheam J W	15	13
PFQ	(Denmark) M Christophersen	21	12	16
6	(Denmark) R Gemke	12	21	21
(India) S Verma	21	14	21
(Republic of Ireland) N Nguyen	9	21	17
(Canada) B Yang	13	19
2	(Japan) K Tsuneyama	21	21

Second round
Q3	(Indonesia) C Adinata	20	15
6	(Denmark) R Gemke	22	21
(India) S Verma	15	14
2	(Japan) K Tsuneyama	21	21

Quarter-finals
6	(Denmark) R Gemke	21	17	19
2	(Japan) K Tsuneyama	18	21	21

== Women's singles ==
=== Seeds ===
1. (Spain) Carolina Marín (semi-finals)
2. (India) P. V. Sindhu (final)
3. (Thailand) Busanan Ongbamrungphan (withdrew)
4. (Japan) Nozomi Okuhara (withdrew)
5. (Indonesia) Gregoria Mariska Tunjung (champion)
6. (Canada) Michelle Li (first round)
7. (Chinese Taipei) Hsu Wen-chi (second round)
8. (United States) Beiwen Zhang (quarter-finals)

=== Finals ===
Semi-finals
1	(Spain) Carolina Marín	21	15	10
5	(Indonesia) Gregoria Mariska Tunjung	10	21	21
(Singapore) Yeo Jia Min	22	20
2	(India) P. V. Sindhu	24	22

Final
5	(Indonesia) Gregoria Mariska Tunjung	21	21
2	(India) P. V. Sindhu	8	8

=== Top half ===
==== Section 1 ====
First round
1	(Spain) C Marín	21	21
(Denmark) L Kjærsfeldt	14	11
(India) M Bansod	21	16	21
PFQ	(Malaysia) Kisona S	19	21	9
6	(Canada) M Li	21	15	18
(India) A Kashyap	12	21	21
PFQ	(Canada) W Y Zhang	13	11
(Japan) N Nidaira	21	21

Second round
1	(Spain) C Marín	w	/	o
(India) M Bansod
(India) A Kashyap	13	8
(Japan) N Nidaira	21	21

Quarter-finals
1	(Spain) C Marín	21	21
(Japan) N Nidaira	16	9

==== Section 2 ====
First round
PFQ	(United States) L Lam	21	19	21
Q1	(Ukraine) P Buhrova	11	21	14
PFQ	(France) Qi XF	21	16	13
(Denmark) L Christophersen	18	21	21
5	(Indonesia) G M Tunjung	21	21
(Scotland) K Gilmour	19	12
(Japan) A Ohori
(South Korea) Kim G-e	w	/	o

Second round
PFQ	(United States) L Lam	15	10
(Denmark) L Christophersen	21	21
5	(Indonesia) G M Tunjung	12	21	23
(South Korea) Kim G-e	21	14	21

Quarter-finals
(Denmark) L Christophersen	10	17
5	(Indonesia) G M Tunjung	21	21

=== Bottom half ===
==== Section 3 ====
First round
(Spain) C Azurmendi	21	21
Q4	(Spain) A Setién	18	13
(Japan) R Gunji	11	21	15^{r}
8	(United States) BW Zhang	21	19	12
Q3	(Canada) T Ng	22	11
(Singapore) Yeo J M	24	21
PFQ	(France) L Huet	12	20
PFQ	(India) A Chaliha	21	22

Second round
(Spain) C Azurmendi	21	17	21
8	(United States) BW Zhang	18	21	23
(Singapore) Yeo J M	21	21
PFQ	(India) A Chaliha	15	15

Quarter-finals
8	(United States) BW Zhang	16	14
(Singapore) Yeo J M	21	21

==== Section 4 ====
First round
(Denmark) M Blichfeldt	10	21	21
(United States) I Wang	21	12	7
(Chinese Taipei) Sung S-y	16	17
7	(Chinese Taipei) Hsu W-c	21	21
(Belgium) L Tan	19	9
(Indonesia) P K Wardani	21	21
Q2	(Switzerland) J Stadelmann	10	14
2	(India) P. V. Sindhu	21	21

Second round
(Denmark) M Blichfeldt	21	21
7	(Chinese Taipei) Hsu W-c	13	12
(Indonesia) P K Wardani	14	16
2	(India) P. V. Sindhu	21	21

Quarter-finals
(Denmark) M Blichfeldt	14	17
2	(India) P. V. Sindhu	21	21

== Men's doubles ==
=== Seeds ===
1. (Indonesia) Fajar Alfian / Muhammad Rian Ardianto (quarter-finals)
2. (India) Satwiksairaj Rankireddy / Chirag Shetty (first round)
3. (Denmark) Kim Astrup / Anders Skaarup Rasmussen (second round)
4. (Indonesia) Leo Rolly Carnando / Daniel Marthin (first round)
5. (Indonesia) Muhammad Shohibul Fikri / Bagas Maulana (second round)
6. (Chinese Taipei) Lu Ching-yao / Yang Po-han (first round)
7. (Germany) Mark Lamsfuß / Marvin Seidel (withdrew)
8. (England) Ben Lane / Sean Vendy (second round)

=== Finals ===
Semi-finals
PFQ	(Chinese Taipei) Lee Fang-chih (Chinese Taipei) Lee Fang-jen	22	21
(Chinese Taipei) Su Ching-heng (Chinese Taipei) Ye Hong-wei	20	19
(China) He Jiting (China) Zhou Haodong	19	21	21
(China) Ren Xiangyu (China) Tan Qiang	21	15	15

Final
PFQ	(Chinese Taipei) Lee Fang-chih (Chinese Taipei) Lee Fang-jen	5	12
(China) He Jiting (China) Zhou Haodong	21	21

=== Top half ===
==== Section 1 ====
First round
1	(Indonesia) F Alfian (Indonesia) M R Ardianto	21	21
Q2	(Canada) K Lee (Canada) T A Lindeman	9	13
Q1	(Denmark) A Søndergaard (Denmark) J Toft	22	21	21
(India) K P Garaga (India) V G Panjala	24	19	19
5	(Indonesia) M S Fikri (Indonesia) B Maulana	21	18	21
(Thailand) S Jomkoh (Thailand) K Kedren	13	21	15
(Chinese Taipei) Lee J-h (Chinese Taipei) Yang P-hs	19	21	13
PFQ	(Chinese Taipei) Lee F-c (Chinese Taipei) Lee F-j	21	18	21

Second round
1	(Indonesia) F Alfian (Indonesia) M R Ardianto	21	22
Q1	(Denmark) A Søndergaard (Denmark) J Toft	13	20
5	(Indonesia) M S Fikri (Indonesia) B Maulana	14	21	20
PFQ	(Chinese Taipei) Lee F-c (Chinese Taipei) Lee F-j	21	10	22

Quarter-finals
1	(Indonesia) F Alfian (Indonesia) M R Ardianto	21	20	19
PFQ	(Chinese Taipei) Lee F-c (Chinese Taipei) Lee F-j	15	22	21

==== Section 2 ====
First round
4	(Indonesia) L R Carnando (Indonesia) D Marthin	21	21	17
Q4	(Japan) S Mezaki (Japan) H Nishida	18	23	21
(India) Arjun M. R. (India) D Kapila	16	21	21
(Scotland) C Grimley (Scotland) M Grimley	21	17	12
6	(Chinese Taipei) Lu C-y (Chinese Taipei) Yang P-h	21	21	12
(Chinese Taipei) Chang K-c (Chinese Taipei) Po L-w	17	23	21
(Chinese Taipei) Su C-h (Chinese Taipei) Ye H-w	21	22
(Canada) A Dong (Canada) N Yakura	19	20

Second round
Q4	(Japan) S Mezaki (Japan) H Nishida	21	22
(India) Arjun M. R. (India) D Kapila	16	20
(Chinese Taipei) Chang K-c (Chinese Taipei) Po L-w	15	15
(Chinese Taipei) Su C-h (Chinese Taipei) Ye H-w	21	21

Quarter-finals
Q4	(Japan) S Mezaki (Japan) H Nishida	21	19	16
(Chinese Taipei) Su C-h (Chinese Taipei) Ye H-w	14	21	21

=== Bottom half ===
==== Section 3 ====
First round
Q3	(Republic of Ireland) J Magee (Republic of Ireland) P Reynolds	14	16
PFQ	(Japan) K Mitsuhashi (Japan) H Okamura	21	21
(France) L Corvée (France) R Labar	22	21	19
PFQ	(Malaysia) Boon X Y (Malaysia) Wong T C	20	23	21
(Denmark) J Bay (Denmark) L Mølhede	13	17
(China) He JT (China) Zhou HD	21	21
(France) C Popov (France) T J Popov	13	15
3	(Denmark) K Astrup (Denmark) A S Rasmussen	21	21

Second round
PFQ	(Japan) K Mitsuhashi (Japan) H Okamura	21	13	21
PFQ	(Malaysia) Boon X Y (Malaysia) Wong T C	19	21	16
(China) He JT (China) Zhou HD	21	21
3	(Denmark) K Astrup (Denmark) A S Rasmussen	17	12

Quarter-finals
PFQ	(Japan) K Mitsuhashi (Japan) H Okamura	21	13	15
(China) He JT (China) Zhou HD	12	21	21

==== Section 4 ====
First round
PFQ	(Germany) B Geiss (Germany) J C Völker	4^{r}
(China) Ren XY (China) Tan Q	11
(Chinese Taipei) Chiu H-c (Chinese Taipei) Yang M-t	10	13
8	(England) B Lane (England) S Vendy	21	21
(Japan) K Matsui (Japan) Y Takeuchi	9	12
(Indonesia) P Kusumawardana (Indonesia) Y Rambitan	21	21
(Japan) A Endo (Japan) Y Takei	11
2	(India) S Rankireddy (India) C Shetty	9^{r}

Second round
(China) Ren XY (China) Tan Q	21	22
8	(England) B Lane (England) S Vendy	15	20
(Indonesia) P Kusumawardana (Indonesia) Y Rambitan	21	20	21
(Japan) A Endo (Japan) Y Takei	14	22	16

Quarter-finals
(China) Ren XY (China) Tan Q	21	21
(Indonesia) P Kusumawardana (Indonesia) Y Rambitan	16	15

== Women's doubles ==
=== Seeds ===
1. (Indonesia) Apriyani Rahayu / Siti Fadia Silva Ramadhanti (withdrew)
2. (Thailand) Jongkolphan Kititharakul / Rawinda Prajongjai (withdrew)
3. (Thailand) Benyapa Aimsaard / Nuntakarn Aimsaard (first round)
4. (Bulgaria) Gabriela Stoeva / Stefani Stoeva (withdrew)
5. (South Korea) Baek Ha-na / Lee So-hee (semi-finals)
6. (India) Treesa Jolly / Gayatri Gopichand (first round)
7. (Indonesia) Febriana Dwipuji Kusuma / Amalia Cahaya Pratiwi (second round)
8. (Germany) Linda Efler / Isabel Lohau (withdrew)

=== Finals ===
Semi-finals
PFQ	(China) Chen Fanghui (China) Du Yue	21	21
(Denmark) Maiken Fruergaard (Denmark) Sara Thygesen	14	17
Q1	(China) Liu Shengshu (China) Tan Ning	21	21
5	(South Korea) Baek Ha-na (South Korea) Lee So-hee	16	14

Final
PFQ	(China) Chen Fanghui (China) Du Yue	8	21	18
Q1	(China) Liu Shengshu (China) Tan Ning	21	16	21

=== Top half ===
==== Section 1 ====
First round
PFQ	(China) Chen FH (China) Du Y	21	21
(Chinese Taipei) Lee C-h (Chinese Taipei) Teng C-h	16	14
(Thailand) S Paewsampran (Thailand) P Supajirakul	25	21	21
(Indonesia) L T Mayasari (Indonesia) R Sugiarto	27	13	13
6	(India) T Jolly (India) G Gopichand	18	16
(Japan) R Miyaura (Japan) A Sakuramoto	21	21
(Singapore) Jin YJ (Singapore) C Wong	17	21	6
(Japan) S Hobara (Japan) Y Suizu	21	15	21

Second round
PFQ	(China) Chen FH (China) Du Y	15	22	21
(Thailand) S Paewsampran (Thailand) P Supajirakul	21	20	14
(Japan) R Miyaura (Japan) A Sakuramoto	21	21
(Japan) S Hobara (Japan) Y Suizu	8	11

Quarter-finals
PFQ	(China) Chen FH (China) Du Y	20	23	21
(Japan) R Miyaura (Japan) A Sakuramoto	22	21	18

==== Section 2 ====
First round
3	(Thailand) B Aimsaard (Thailand) N Aimsaard	17	17
(China) Li YJ (China) Luo XM	21	21
(Chinese Taipei) Hu L-f (Chinese Taipei) Lin X-m	15	21	18
(Denmark) M Fruergaard (Denmark) S Thygesen	21	17	21
PFQ	(Estonia) K-K Marran (Estonia) H Rüütel	11	15
(England) C Birch (England) L Smith	21	21
(India) A Bhat (India) S Gautam	11	22
(France) M Lambert (France) A Tran	21	24

Second round
(China) Li YJ (China) Luo XM	21	19	19
(Denmark) M Fruergaard (Denmark) S Thygesen	14	21	21
(England) C Birch (England) L Smith	13	21	21
(France) M Lambert (France) A Tran	21	12	18

Quarter-finals
(Denmark) M Fruergaard (Denmark) S Thygesen	21	21
(England) C Birch (England) L Smith	17	10

=== Bottom half ===
==== Section 3 ====
First round
Q4	(Denmark) N P Anthonisen (Denmark) C Graversen	9	11
Q1	(China) Liu SS (China) Tan N	21	21
(Chinese Taipei) Hsu Y-c (Chinese Taipei) Lin W-c	12	16
7	(Indonesia) F D Kusuma (Indonesia) A C Pratiwi	21	21
Q2	(Indonesia) M T P Sari (Indonesia) R A Rose	21	21
(United States) F Corbett (United States) A Lee	13	9
(Chinese Taipei) Chang C-h (Chinese Taipei) Yang C-t	21	21
PFQ	(Republic of Ireland) K Frost (Republic of Ireland) M Ryan	12	9

Second round
Q1	(China) Liu SS (China) Tan N	21	20	21
7	(Indonesia) F D Kusuma (Indonesia) A C Pratiwi	11	22	8
Q2	(Indonesia) M T P Sari (Indonesia) R A Rose	21	21
(Chinese Taipei) Chang C-h (Chinese Taipei) Yang C-t	15	16

Quarter-finals
Q1	(China) Liu SS (China) Tan N	21	21
Q2	(Indonesia) M T P Sari (Indonesia) R A Rose	11	14

==== Section 4 ====
First round
Q3	(United States) P L Cao Hok (United States) L Lam	17	21	19
(Canada) C Choi (Canada) J Wu	21	19	21
(Germany) S Küspert (Germany) E Moszczynski	14	9
5	(South Korea) Baek H-n (South Korea) Lee S-h	21	21
(Japan) R Hirokami (Japan) Y Kato	21	21
(Brazil) J Lima (Brazil) S Lima	9	14
(United States) A Xu (United States) K Xu	21	18	11
PFQ	(India) N S Reddy (India) A S Sunil	16	21	21

Second round
(Canada) C Choi (Canada) J Wu	19	15
5	(South Korea) Baek H-n (South Korea) Lee S-h	21	21
(Japan) R Hirokami (Japan) Y Kato	21	21
PFQ	(India) N S Reddy (India) A S Sunil	12	13

Quarter-finals
5	(South Korea) Baek H-n (South Korea) Lee S-h	21	11	21
(Japan) R Hirokami (Japan) Y Kato	14	21	14

== Mixed doubles ==
=== Seeds ===
1. (Thailand) Dechapol Puavaranukroh / Sapsiree Taerattanachai (quarter-finals)
2. (France) Thom Gicquel / Delphine Delrue (withdrew)
3. (Germany) Mark Lamsfuß / Isabel Lohau (withdrew)
4. (Malaysia) Goh Soon Huat / Shevon Jemie Lai (first round)
5. (Indonesia) Rinov Rivaldy / Pitha Haningtyas Mentari (withdrew)
6. (Thailand) Supak Jomkoh / Supissara Paewsampran (second round)
7. (Indonesia) Rehan Naufal Kusharjanto / Lisa Ayu Kusumawati (quarter-finals)
8. (Denmark) Mathias Christiansen / Alexandra Bøje (champions)

=== Finals ===
Semi-finals
8	(Denmark) Mathias Christiansen (Denmark) Alexandra Bøje	21	21
(England) Gregory Mairs (England) Jenny Moore	12	18
(Indonesia) Praveen Jordan (Indonesia) Melati Daeva Oktavianti	21	22	21
(Denmark) Mathias Thyrri (Denmark) Amalie Magelund	13	24	12

Final
8	(Denmark) Mathias Christiansen (Denmark) Alexandra Bøje	22	21
(Indonesia) Praveen Jordan (Indonesia) Melati Daeva Oktavianti	20	18

=== Top half ===
==== Section 1 ====
First round
1	(Thailand) D Puavaranukroh (Thailand) S Taerattanachai	21	21
Q1	(Chinese Taipei) Chen X-y (Chinese Taipei) Yang C-t	9	11
(Brazil) F Farias (Brazil) J Lima	17	12
(United States) V Chiu (United States) J Gai	21	21
8	(Denmark) M Christiansen (Denmark) A Bøje	21	21
(Indonesia) Z J Sumanti (Indonesia) H Julimarbela	12	6
(Chinese Taipei) Ye H-w (Chinese Taipei) Lee C-h	21	14	20
PFQ	(China) Cheng X (China) Chen FH	15	21	22

Second round
1	(Thailand) D Puavaranukroh (Thailand) S Taerattanachai	21	21
(United States) V Chiu (United States) J Gai	7	5
8	(Denmark) M Christiansen (Denmark) A Bøje	14	21	21
PFQ	(China) Cheng X (China) Chen FH	21	15	15

Quarter-finals
1	(Thailand) D Puavaranukroh (Thailand) S Taerattanachai	21	18
8	(Denmark) M Christiansen (Denmark) A Bøje	23	21

==== Section 2 ====
First round
4	(Malaysia) Goh S H (Malaysia) S J Lai	19	10
(Chinese Taipei) Chang K-c (Chinese Taipei) Lee C-c	21	21
(Denmark) M Mikkelsen (Denmark) R Søby	21	13	16
(England) G Mairs (England) J Moore	19	21	21
6	(Thailand) S Jomkoh (Thailand) S Paewsampran	21	17	21
Q3	(China) He JT (China) Du Y	14	21	18
(China) Jiang ZB (China) Wei YX	21	21
(Algeria) K Mammeri (Algeria) T Mammeri	13	14

Second round
(Chinese Taipei) Chang K-c (Chinese Taipei) Lee C-c	13	17
(England) G Mairs (England) J Moore	21	21
6	(Thailand) S Jomkoh (Thailand) S Paewsampran	17	23
(China) Jiang ZB (China) Wei YX	21	25

Quarter-finals
(England) G Mairs (England) J Moore	17	21	21
(China) Jiang ZB (China) Wei YX	21	13	18

=== Bottom half ===
==== Section 3 ====
First round
(Chinese Taipei) Lee J-h (Chinese Taipei) Hsu Y-c	w	/	o
(Singapore) T Hee (Singapore) J Tan
(Chinese Taipei) Yang P-h (Chinese Taipei) Hu L-f	18	17
7	(Indonesia) R N Kusharjanto (Indonesia) L A Kusumawati	21	21
(Indonesia) P Jordan (Indonesia) M D Oktavianti	21	21
(Malaysia) Chan P S (Malaysia) Cheah Y S	18	19
(Canada) T A Lindeman (Canada) J Wu	21	21
PFQ	(Brazil) D Silva (Brazil) S Lima	8	17

Second round
(Chinese Taipei) Lee J-h (Chinese Taipei) Hsu Y-c	12	14
7	(Indonesia) R N Kusharjanto (Indonesia) L A Kusumawati	21	21
(Indonesia) P Jordan (Indonesia) M D Oktavianti	22	21
(Canada) T A Lindeman (Canada) J Wu	20	18

Quarter-finals
7	(Indonesia) R N Kusharjanto (Indonesia) L A Kusumawati	18	21	18
(Indonesia) P Jordan (Indonesia) M D Oktavianti	21	16	21

==== Section 4 ====
First round
Q2	(Indonesia) A Maulana (Indonesia) N V Marwah	19	21	21
(England) M Ellis (England) L Smith	21	16	17
(Denmark) M Thyrri (Denmark) A Magelund	21	21
PFQ	(Denmark) M Vestergaard (Denmark) C Busch	18	19
PFQ	(Denmark) J Toft (Denmark) C Graversen	21	21
(Indonesia) A B Cahyono (Indonesia) M G Islami	18	19
Q4	(Indonesia) A Syahnawi (Indonesia) W O Kandow	22	22
PFQ	(Thailand) R Oupthong (Thailand) J Sudjaipraparat	20	20

Second round
Q2	(Indonesia) A Maulana (Indonesia) N V Marwah	21	14	20
(Denmark) M Thyrri (Denmark) A Magelund	15	21	22
PFQ	(Denmark) J Toft (Denmark) C Graversen	21	13	16
Q4	(Indonesia) A Syahnawi (Indonesia) W O Kandow	19	21	21

Quarter-finals
(Denmark) M Thyrri (Denmark) A Magelund	22	11	21
Q4	(Indonesia) A Syahnawi (Indonesia) W O Kandow	20	21	19

Preceded by 2021 Spain Masters	Spain Masters	Succeeded by 2024 Spain Masters
Preceded by 2023 Swiss Open	BWF World Tour; 2023 BWF season	Succeeded by 2023 Orléans Masters
