= 2024 Malaysia Open (badminton) =

Badminton tournament in Malaysia

Tournament details
- Dates: 9–14 January
- Edition: 67th
- Level: Super 1000
- Total prize money: US$1,300,000
- Venue: Axiata Arena
- Location: Kuala Lumpur, Malaysia

Champions
- Men's singles: (Denmark) Anders Antonsen
- Women's singles: (South Korea) An Se-young
- Men's doubles: (China) Liang Weikeng (China) Wang Chang
- Women's doubles: (China) Liu Shengshu (China) Tan Ning
- Mixed doubles: (Japan) Yuta Watanabe (Japan) Arisa Higashino

The 2024 Malaysia Open (officially known as the Petronas Malaysia Open 2024 for sponsorship reasons) was a badminton tournament that took place at the Axiata Arena, Kuala Lumpur, Malaysia, from 9 to 14 January 2024 and had a total prize of US$1,300,000.

== Tournament ==
The 2024 Malaysia Open was the first tournament of the 2024 BWF World Tour and is part of the Malaysia Open championships, which had been held since 1937. This tournament was organized by the Badminton Association of Malaysia with sanction from the BWF.

=== Venue ===
This tournament was held at the Axiata Arena inside the KL Sports City in Kuala Lumpur, Malaysia.

=== Point distribution ===
Below is the point distribution table for each phase of the tournament based on the BWF points system for the BWF World Tour Super 1000 event.

Winner	Runner-up	3/4	5/8	9/16	17/32
12,000	10,200	8,400	6,600	4,800	3,000

=== Prize pool ===
The total prize money is US$1,300,000 with the distribution of the prize money in accordance with BWF regulations.

Event	Winner	Finalist	Semi-finals	Quarter-finals	Last 16	Last 32
Singles	$91,000	$44,200	$18,200	$7,150	$3,900	$1,300
Doubles	$96,200	$45,500	$18,200	$8,125	$4,225	$1,300

== Men's singles ==
=== Seeds ===
1. (Denmark) Viktor Axelsen (semi-finals)
2. (Japan) Kodai Naraoka (quarter-finals)
3. (China) Li Shifeng (quarter-finals)
4. (Indonesia) Anthony Sinisuka Ginting (second round)
5. (Thailand) Kunlavut Vitidsarn (second round)
6. (Indonesia) Jonatan Christie (first round)
7. (China) Shi Yuqi (final)
8. (India) Prannoy H. S. (first round)

=== Finals ===
Semi-finals
1	(Denmark) Viktor Axelsen	12	21	17
7	(China) Shi Yuqi	21	19	21
(Chinese Taipei) Lin Chun-yi	16	7
(Denmark) Anders Antonsen	21	21

Final
7	(China) Shi Yuqi	14	13
(Denmark) Anders Antonsen	21	21

=== Top half ===
==== Section 1 ====
First round
1	(Denmark) V Axelsen	21	21
(Singapore) Loh K Y	13	15
(Hong Kong) Lee C Y	21	18	21
(Denmark) M Johannesen	13	21	19
6	(Indonesia) J Christie	21	18	16
(India) S Kidambi	12	21	21
(Japan) K Tsuneyama	15	9
(Hong Kong) Ng K L	21	21

Second round
1	(Denmark) V Axelsen	21	20	21
(Hong Kong) Lee C Y	17	22	17
(India) S Kidambi	13	17
(Hong Kong) Ng K L	21	21

Quarter-finals
1	(Denmark) V Axelsen	16	21	21
(Hong Kong) Ng K L	21	18	9

==== Section 2 ====
First round
4	(Indonesia) A S Ginting	21	21
(Chinese Taipei) Su L-y	18	12
(China) Lu GZ	16	21	21
(Malaysia) Lee Z J	21	19	15
7	(China) Shi YQ	20	21	21
(Denmark) R Gemke	22	12	10
(Chinese Taipei) Chou T-c	11	21	15
(France) T J Popov	21	19	21

Second round
4	(Indonesia) A S Ginting	21	23
(China) Lu GZ	23	25
7	(China) Shi YQ	21	21
(France) T J Popov	13	5

Quarter-finals
(China) Lu GZ	21	11	10
7	(China) Shi YQ	8	21	21

=== Bottom half ===
==== Section 3 ====
First round
(Chinese Taipei) Lin C-y	21	21
(Thailand) K Wangcharoen	17	13
(Japan) K Nishimoto	14	23	15
5	(Thailand) K Vitidsarn	21	21	21
(China) Weng HY	21	21
(India) L Sen	15	16
PFR	(Chinese Taipei) Lee C-h	21	21	18
3	(China) Li SF	23	15	21

Second round
(Chinese Taipei) Lin C-y	21	21
5	(Thailand) K Vitidsarn	18	16
(China) Weng HY	21	16	18
3	(China) Li SF	13	21	21

Quarter-finals
(Chinese Taipei) Lin C-y	21	21
3	(China) Li SF	12	18

==== Section 4 ====
First round
(Malaysia) Ng T Y	8^{r}
(Japan) K Watanabe	12
(Denmark) A Antonsen	21	21
8	(India) Prannoy H. S.	14	11
(Canada) B Yang	11	21	21
(Chinese Taipei) Wang T-w	21	17	16
(France) C Popov	15	7
2	(Japan) K Naraoka	21	21

Second round
(Japan) K Watanabe	14	17
(Denmark) A Antonsen	21	21
(Canada) B Yang	20	22	16
2	(Japan) K Naraoka	22	20	21

Quarter-finals
(Denmark) A Antonsen	16	21	21
2	(Japan) K Naraoka	21	12	7

== Women's singles ==
=== Seeds ===
1. (South Korea) An Se-young (Champion)
2. (China) Chen Yufei (semi-finals)
3. (Japan) Akane Yamaguchi (quarter-finals)
4. (Chinese Taipei) Tai Tzu-ying (final)
5. (Spain) Carolina Marín (withdrew)
6. (China) He Bingjiao (quarter-finals)
7. (Indonesia) Gregoria Mariska Tunjung (quarter-finals)
8. (China) Han Yue (second round)

=== Finals ===
Semi-finals
1	(South Korea) An Se-young	21	21
(China) Zhang Yiman	17	11
4	(Chinese Taipei) Tai Tzu-ying	17	21	21
2	(China) Chen Yufei	21	15	18

Final
1	(South Korea) An Se-young	10	21	21
4	(Chinese Taipei) Tai Tzu-ying	21	10	18

=== Top half ===
==== Section 1 ====
First round
1	(South Korea) An S-y	21	21
(Denmark) L Kjærsfeldt	16	10
PFR	(Belgium) L Tan	20	20
(Germany) Y Li	22	22
8	(China) Han Y	21	21
(Indonesia) P K Wardani	11	13
(Canada) M Li	9	14
(Singapore) Yeo J M	21	21

Second round
1	(South Korea) An S-y	21	21
(Germany) Y Li	13	8
8	(China) Han Y	21	19	20
(Singapore) Yeo J M	16	21	22

Quarter-finals
1	(South Korea) An S-y	16	21	21
(Singapore) Yeo J M	21	12	19

==== Section 2 ====
First round
3	(Japan) A Yamaguchi	21	22
(Thailand) S Katethong	15	20
(Turkey) N Arın	23	14	13
(Scotland) K Gilmour	21	21	21
PFR	(India) A Kashyap	15	15
(China) Zhang YM	21	21
(Chinese Taipei) Pai Y-p	14	16
(Chinese Taipei) Hsu W-c	21	21

Second round
3	(Japan) A Yamaguchi	21	21
(Scotland) K Gilmour	9	14
(China) Zhang YM	21	21
(Chinese Taipei) Hsu W-c	8	10

Quarter-finals
3	(Japan) A Yamaguchi	21	17	17
(China) Zhang YM	12	21	21

=== Bottom half ===
==== Section 3 ====
First round
PFR	(Thailand) P Choeikeewong	14	14
(China) Wang ZY	21	21
(Denmark) M Blichfeldt	15	15
6	(China) He BJ	21	21
(China) Gao FJ	21	20	10
(Thailand) B Ongbamrungphan	17	22	21
(United States) BW Zhang	21	19
4	(Chinese Taipei) Tai T-y	23	21

Second round
(China) Wang ZY	21	19	11
6	(China) He BJ	16	21	21
(Thailand) B Ongbamrungphan	7	11
4	(Chinese Taipei) Tai T-y	21	21

Quarter-finals
6	(China) He BJ	16	15
4	(Chinese Taipei) Tai T-y	21	21

==== Section 4 ====
First round
(Malaysia) Goh J W	21	21
(Chinese Taipei) Sung S-y	18	11
(Japan) N Nidaira	22	18	14
7	(Indonesia) G M Tunjung	20	21	21
(Thailand) R Intanon	21	21
PFR	(Myanmar) Thet Htar T	19	10
(Japan) A Ohori	18	12
2	(China) Chen YF	21	21

Second round
(Malaysia) Goh J W	15	22
7	(Indonesia) G M Tunjung	21	24
(Thailand) R Intanon	15	18
2	(China) Chen YF	21	21

Quarter-finals
7	(Indonesia) G M Tunjung	13	17
2	(China) Chen YF	21	21

== Men's doubles ==
=== Seeds ===
1. (China) Liang Weikeng / Wang Chang (champions)
2. (India) Satwiksairaj Rankireddy / Chirag Shetty (final)
3. (Malaysia) Aaron Chia / Soh Wooi Yik (quarter-finals)
4. (Denmark) Kim Astrup / Anders Skaarup Rasmussen (second round)
5. (Indonesia) Fajar Alfian / Muhammad Rian Ardianto (quarter-finals)
6. (South Korea) Kang Min-hyuk / Seo Seung-jae (semi-finals)
7. (Japan) Takuro Hoki / Yugo Kobayashi (semi-finals)
8. (China) Liu Yuchen / Ou Xuanyi (first round)

=== Finals ===
Semi-finals
1	(China) Liang Weikeng (China) Wang Chang	21	19	21
7	(Japan) Takuro Hoki (Japan) Yugo Kobayashi	12	21	13
6	(South Korea) Kang Min-hyuk (South Korea) Seo Seung-jae	18	20
2	(India) Satwiksairaj Rankireddy (India) Chirag Shetty	21	22

Final
1	(China) Liang Weikeng (China) Wang Chang	9	21	21
2	(India) Satwiksairaj Rankireddy (India) Chirag Shetty	21	18	17

=== Top half ===
==== Section 1 ====
First round
1	(China) Liang WK (China) Wang C	21	21
(Malaysia) Man W C (Malaysia) Tee K W	12	19
(Japan) K Matsui (Japan) Y Takeuchi	22	21
(Germany) M Lamsfuß (Germany) M Seidel	20	16
5	(Indonesia) F Alfian (Indonesia) M R Ardianto	21	21
(Canada) A Dong (Canada) N Yakura	16	13
(Chinese Taipei) Lee F-c (Chinese Taipei) Lee F-j	21	21
PFR	(India) Arjun M. R. (India) D Kapila	16	19

Second round
1	(China) Liang WK (China) Wang C	21	21
(Japan) K Matsui (Japan) Y Takeuchi	14	14
5	(Indonesia) F Alfian (Indonesia) M R Ardianto	21	21
(Chinese Taipei) Lee F-c (Chinese Taipei) Lee F-j	13	12

Quarter-finals
1	(China) Liang WK (China) Wang C	16	21	21
5	(Indonesia) F Alfian (Indonesia) M R Ardianto	21	17	18

==== Section 2 ====
First round
4	(Denmark) K Astrup (Denmark) A S Rasmussen	21	21
(Indonesia) L R Carnando (Indonesia) D Marthin	16	10
(Chinese Taipei) Lu C-y (Chinese Taipei) Yang P-ha	14	15
(Malaysia) Ong Y S (Malaysia) Teo E Y	21	21
7	(Japan) T Hoki (Japan) Y Kobayashi	21	21
(Chinese Taipei) Lee Y (Chinese Taipei) Wang C-l	16	15
(Scotland) A Dunn (Scotland) A Hall	24	17	21
(France) C Popov (France) T J Popov	22	21	17

Second round
4	(Denmark) K Astrup (Denmark) A S Rasmussen	10	21	22
(Malaysia) Ong Y S (Malaysia) Teo E Y	21	11	24
7	(Japan) T Hoki (Japan) Y Kobayashi	21	21
(Scotland) A Dunn (Scotland) A Hall	11	13

Quarter-finals
(Malaysia) Ong Y S (Malaysia) Teo E Y	15	9
7	(Japan) T Hoki (Japan) Y Kobayashi	21	21

=== Bottom half ===
==== Section 3 ====
First round
(Chinese Taipei) Lee J-h (Chinese Taipei) Yang P-hs	20	22	21
(China) Chen BY (China) Liu Yi	22	20	12
(England) B Lane (England) S Vendy	14	14
6	(South Korea) Kang M-h (South Korea) Seo S-j	21	21
(Thailand) S Jomkoh (Thailand) K Kedren	17	20
(Malaysia) Goh S F (Malaysia) N Izzuddin	21	22
(Denmark) R Kjær (Denmark) F Søgaard	22	13	13
3	(Malaysia) A Chia (Malaysia) Soh W Y	20	21	21

Second round
(Chinese Taipei) Lee J-h (Chinese Taipei) Yang P-hs	13	14
6	(South Korea) Kang M-h (South Korea) Seo S-j	21	21
(Malaysia) Goh S F (Malaysia) N Izzuddin	15	16
3	(Malaysia) A Chia (Malaysia) Soh W Y	21	21

Quarter-finals
6	(South Korea) Kang M-h (South Korea) Seo S-j	16	21	21
3	(Malaysia) A Chia (Malaysia) Soh W Y	21	18	13

==== Section 4 ====
First round
(Japan) A Koga (Japan) T Saito	18	15
(Indonesia) M Ahsan (Indonesia) H Setiawan	21	21
(China) He JT (China) Ren XY	21	21
8	(China) Liu YC (China) Ou XY	19	15
(France) L Corvée (France) R Labar	21	9	21
(South Korea) Kim W-h (South Korea) Na S-s	16	21	19
(Indonesia) M S Fikri (Indonesia) B Maulana	18	19
2	(India) S Rankireddy (India) C Shetty	21	21

Second round
(Indonesia) M Ahsan (Indonesia) H Setiawan	17	7^{r}
(China) He JT (China) Ren XY	21	15
(France) L Corvée (France) R Labar	11	18
2	(India) S Rankireddy (India) C Shetty	21	21

Quarter-finals
(China) He JT (China) Ren XY	11	8
2	(India) S Rankireddy (India) C Shetty	21	21

== Women's doubles ==
=== Seeds ===
1. (China) Chen Qingchen / Jia Yifan (quarter-finals)
2. (South Korea) Baek Ha-na / Lee So-hee (semi-finals)
3. (South Korea) Kim So-yeong / Kong Hee-yong (second round)
4. (Japan) Nami Matsuyama / Chiharu Shida (second round)
5. (China) Zhang Shuxian / Zheng Yu (final)
6. (Indonesia) Apriyani Rahayu / Siti Fadia Silva Ramadhanti (withdrew)
7. (Japan) Mayu Matsumoto / Wakana Nagahara (second round)
8. (China) Liu Shengshu / Tan Ning (champions)

=== Finals ===
Semi-finals
8	(China) Liu Shengshu (China) Tan Ning	21	21
(Japan) Rin Iwanaga (Japan) Kie Nakanishi	11	16
5	(China) Zhang Shuxian (China) Zheng Yu	21	21
2	(South Korea) Baek Ha-na (South Korea) Lee So-hee	17	17

Final
8	(China) Liu Shengshu (China) Tan Ning	21	21
5	(China) Zhang Shuxian (China) Zheng Yu	18	18

=== Top half ===
==== Section 1 ====
First round
1	(China) Chen QC (China) Jia YF	21	21
(South Korea) Lee Y-l (South Korea) Shin S-c	14	14
(Denmark) M Fruergaard (Denmark) S Thygesen	21	21
(Canada) C Choi (Canada) J Wu	13	11
8	(China) Liu SS (China) Tan N	22	21
(Malaysia) P Tan (Malaysia) Thinaah M	20	15
(China) Li YJ (China) Luo XM	21	21
(Netherlands) D Jille (Netherlands) C Seinen	18	16

Second round
1	(China) Chen QC (China) Jia YF	21	22
(Denmark) M Fruergaard (Denmark) S Thygesen	13	20
8	(China) Liu SS (China) Tan N	21	21
(China) Li YJ (China) Luo XM	19	10

Quarter-finals
1	(China) Chen QC (China) Jia YF	12	21	10
8	(China) Liu SS (China) Tan N	21	17	21

==== Section 2 ====
First round
3	(South Korea) Kim S-y (South Korea) Kong H-y	21	21
(Chinese Taipei) Lee C-h (Chinese Taipei) Teng C-h	11	11
(Japan) R Iwanaga (Japan) K Nakanishi	14
(South Korea) Jeong N-e (South Korea) Kim H-j	8^{r}
7	(Japan) M Matsumoto (Japan) W Nagahara	21	21
PFR	(India) R Panda (India) S Panda	12	11
(United States) F Corbett (United States) A Lee	13	16
(India) T Crasto (India) A Ponnappa	21	21

Second round
3	(South Korea) Kim S-y (South Korea) Kong H-y	16	16
(Japan) R Iwanaga (Japan) K Nakanishi	21	21
7	(Japan) M Matsumoto (Japan) W Nagahara	19	21	15
(India) T Crasto (India) A Ponnappa	21	13	21

Quarter-finals
(Japan) R Iwanaga (Japan) K Nakanishi	21	21
(India) T Crasto (India) A Ponnappa	15	13

=== Bottom half ===
==== Section 3 ====
First round
(France) M Lambert (France) A Tran	21	16	16
(United States) A Xu (United States) K Xu	19	21	21
PFR	(Malaysia) Go P K (Malaysia) Low Y Y	13	13
5	(China) Zhang SX (China) Zheng Y	21	21
(Japan) R Miyaura (Japan) A Sakuramoto	21	21
(Japan) R Hirokami (Japan) Y Kato	17	9
(United States) P L Cao Hok (United States) L Lam	11	9
4	(Japan) N Matsuyama (Japan) C Shida	21	21

Second round
(United States) A Xu (United States) K Xu	14	8
5	(China) Zhang SX (China) Zheng Y	21	21
(Japan) R Miyaura (Japan) A Sakuramoto	21	13	21
4	(Japan) N Matsuyama (Japan) C Shida	11	21	18

Quarter-finals
5	(China) Zhang SX (China) Zheng Y	21	21
(Japan) R Miyaura (Japan) A Sakuramoto	17	15

==== Section 4 ====
First round
(China) Li WM (China) Liu XX	21	21
(Malaysia) V Hoo (Malaysia) Lim C S	15	16
(Thailand) J Kititharakul (Thailand) R Prajongjai	21	21
PFR	(Australia) S Mapasa (Australia) A Yu	12	17
(Hong Kong) Yeung N T (Hong Kong) Yeung P L	21	21
(Germany) L Efler (Germany) I Lohau	17	16
(Malaysia) A Cheong (Malaysia) Teoh M X	14	13
2	(South Korea) Baek H-n (South Korea) Lee S-h	21	21

Second round
(China) Li WM (China) Liu XX	19	22	21
(Thailand) J Kititharakul (Thailand) R Prajongjai	21	20	14
(Hong Kong) Yeung N T (Hong Kong) Yeung P L	13	20
2	(South Korea) Baek H-n (South Korea) Lee S-h	21	22

Quarter-finals
(China) Li WM (China) Liu XX	13	14
2	(South Korea) Baek H-n (South Korea) Lee S-h	21	21

== Mixed doubles ==
=== Seeds ===
1. (China) Zheng Siwei / Huang Yaqiong (quarter-finals)
2. (Japan) Yuta Watanabe / Arisa Higashino (champions)
3. (South Korea) Seo Seung-jae / Chae Yoo-jung (quarter-finals)
4. (China) Feng Yanzhe / Huang Dongping (first round)
5. (China) Jiang Zhenbang / Wei Yaxin (semi-finals)
6. (Thailand) Dechapol Puavaranukroh / Sapsiree Taerattanachai (quarter-finals)
7. (South Korea) Kim Won-ho / Jeong Na-eun (final)
8. (Malaysia) Chen Tang Jie / Toh Ee Wei (second round)

=== Finals ===
Semi-finals
7	(South Korea) Kim Won-ho (South Korea) Jeong Na-eun	21	21
(Singapore) Terry Hee (Singapore) Jessica Tan	16	16
5	(China) Jiang Zhenbang (China) Wei Yaxin	15	21	15
2	(Japan) Yuta Watanabe (Japan) Arisa Higashino	21	12	21

Final
7	(South Korea) Kim Won-ho (South Korea) Jeong Na-eun	18	15
2	(Japan) Yuta Watanabe (Japan) Arisa Higashino	21	21

=== Top half ===
==== Section 1 ====
First round
1	(China) Zheng SW (China) Huang YQ	21	21
(Hong Kong) Lee C H (Hong Kong) Ng T Y	14	17
(Germany) M Lamsfuß (Germany) I Lohau	15	21	17
(Indonesia) R N Kusharjanto (Indonesia) L A Kusumawati	21	12	21
7	(South Korea) Kim W-h (South Korea) Jeong N-e	21	21
(Malaysia) Tan K M (Malaysia) Lai P J	11	16
(Japan) K Yamashita (Japan) N Shinoya	21	18	21
(Japan) Y Kaneko (Japan) M Matsutomo	15	21	11

Second round
1	(China) Zheng SW (China) Huang YQ	21	21
(Indonesia) R N Kusharjanto (Indonesia) L A Kusumawati	18	17
7	(South Korea) Kim W-h (South Korea) Jeong N-e	11	21	21
(Japan) K Yamashita (Japan) N Shinoya	21	17	18

Quarter-finals
1	(China) Zheng SW (China) Huang YQ	11	21	17
7	(South Korea) Kim W-h (South Korea) Jeong N-e	21	18	21

==== Section 2 ====
First round
4	(China) Feng YZ (China) Huang DP	20	19
(Thailand) S Jomkoh (Thailand) S Paewsampran	22	21
(Singapore) T Hee (Singapore) J Tan	15	21	21
(Chinese Taipei) Ye H-w (Chinese Taipei) Lee C-h	21	19	12
6	(Thailand) D Puavaranukroh (Thailand) S Taerattanachai	21	21
(Netherlands) R Tabeling (Netherlands) S Piek	15	10
(England) G Mairs (England) J Mairs	16	21	17
(Malaysia) Goh S H (Malaysia) S J Lai	21	15	21

Second round
(Thailand) S Jomkoh (Thailand) S Paewsampran	14	21
(Singapore) T Hee (Singapore) J Tan	21	23
6	(Thailand) D Puavaranukroh (Thailand) S Taerattanachai	21	21
(Malaysia) Goh S H (Malaysia) S J Lai	15	12

Quarter-finals
(Singapore) T Hee (Singapore) J Tan	21	21
6	(Thailand) D Puavaranukroh (Thailand) S Taerattanachai	16	19

=== Bottom half ===
==== Section 3 ====
First round
(Chinese Taipei) Chang K-c (Chinese Taipei) Lee C-c	21	24	8
(Malaysia) Chan P S (Malaysia) Cheah Y S	11	26	21
PFR	(China) Cheng X (China) Zhang C	18	16
5	(China) Jiang ZB (China) Wei YX	21	21
(Indonesia) D Ferdinansyah (Indonesia) G E Widjaja	21	19	21
(England) M Ellis (England) L Smith	11	21	19
(Canada) T A Lindeman (Canada) J Wu	12	11
3	(South Korea) Seo S-j (South Korea) Chae Y-j	21	21

Second round
(Malaysia) Chan P S (Malaysia) Cheah Y S	14	14
5	(China) Jiang ZB (China) Wei YX	21	21
(Indonesia) D Ferdinansyah (Indonesia) G E Widjaja	12	16
3	(South Korea) Seo S-j (South Korea) Chae Y-j	21	21

Quarter-finals
5	(China) Jiang ZB (China) Wei YX	21	21
3	(South Korea) Seo S-j (South Korea) Chae Y-j	19	14

==== Section 4 ====
First round
(United States) V Chiu (United States) J Gai	13	13
(Japan) H Midorikawa (Japan) N Saito	21	21
(France) T Gicquel (France) D Delrue	17	18
8	(Malaysia) Chen T J (Malaysia) Toh E W	21	21
(Denmark) M Thyrri (Denmark) A Magelund	21	21
(Indonesia) R Rivaldy (Indonesia) P H Mentari	17	14
(Hong Kong) Tang C M (Hong Kong) Tse Y S	13	14
2	(Japan) Y Watanabe (Japan) A Higashino	21	21

Second round
(Japan) H Midorikawa (Japan) N Saito	24	21
8	(Malaysia) Chen T J (Malaysia) Toh E W	22	14
(Denmark) M Thyrri (Denmark) A Magelund	15	11
2	(Japan) Y Watanabe (Japan) A Higashino	21	21

Quarter-finals
(Japan) H Midorikawa (Japan) N Saito	14	8
2	(Japan) Y Watanabe (Japan) A Higashino	21	21

Preceded by 2023 BWF World Tour Finals; 2023 Odisha Masters	BWF World Tour; 2024 BWF season	Succeeded by 2024 India Open
