= Badminton at the 2023 Pan American Games – Mixed doubles =

Badminton – Mixed doubles at the 2023 Pan American Games
- Venue: Olympic Training Center
- Start date: October 21, 2023
- End date: October 25, 2023
- Competitors: 50 from 16 nations

Medalists
Gold medal	Ty Alexander Lindeman; Josephine Wu	Canada
Silver medal	Vinson Chiu; Jennie Gai	United States
Bronze medal	Davi Silva; Sânia Lima	Brazil
Bronze medal	José Guevara; Inés Castillo	Peru

The mixed doubles badminton event at the 2023 Pan American Games was held from October 21 to 25 at the Olympic Training Center, located in Ñuñoa, a suburb of Santiago. The defending Pan American Games champion are Joshua Hurlburt-Yu and Josephine Wu of Canada. The pair have since split up and Wu will be competing with new partner Ty Alexander Lindeman.

Each National Olympic Committee could enter a maximum of two pairs into the competition. The athletes will be drawn into an elimination stage draw. Once a pair lost a match, they will be no longer able to compete. Each match will be contested as the best of three games. A total of 50 athletes from 16 NOC's competed.

== Qualification ==
A total of 90 athletes (45 men and 45 women) qualified to compete at the games. A nation may enter a maximum of four athletes per gender (five if qualified through the 2021 Junior Pan American Games. As host nation, Chile automatically qualified a full team of eights athletes. All other quotas will be awarded through the team world rankings as of May 2, 2023. Each nation's highest ranked athlete/pair's points in each of the five events will be added to determine a country's point total.

== Seeds ==
The following pairs were seeded:

1. Vinson Chiu / Jennie Gai (USA) (final, silver medalists)
2. Ty Alexander Lindeman / Josephine Wu (CAN) (champions, gold medalists)
3. Fabrício Farias / Jaqueline Lima (BRA) (second round, withdrew)
4. Davi Silva / Sânia Lima (BRA) (semi-finals, bronze medalists)

== Results ==
=== Final ===
Final
1	Vinson Chiu (USA); Jennie Gai (USA)	21	17	19
2	Ty Alexander Lindeman (CAN); Josephine Wu (CAN)	17	21	21

=== Top half ===
First round
Benjamín Bahamondez (CHI); Ashley Montre (CHI)	17	11
Diego Mini (PER); Paula la Torre (PER)	21	21
Henry Huebla (ECU); María Zambrano (ECU)	21	21
Manuel Mejía (ESA); Gabriela Barrios (ESA)	8	14
Santiago Otero (ARG); Iona Gualdi (ARG)	8	13
Jonathan Solís (EAI); Diana Corleto (EAI)	21	21
Roberto Herrera (CUB); Taymara Oropesa (CUB)	14	12
Luis Montoya (MEX); Miriam Rodríguez (MEX)	21	21

Second round
1	Vinson Chiu (USA); Jennie Gai (USA)	21	21
Diego Mini (PER); Paula la Torre (PER)	5	6
Ángel Mariñez (DOM); Alissa Acosta (DOM)	15	8
Henry Huebla (ECU); María Zambrano (ECU)	21	21
4	Davi Silva (BRA); Sânia Lima (BRA)	21	22	21
Jonathan Solís (EAI); Diana Corleto (EAI)	12	24	14
Samuel Ricketts (JAM); Tahlia Richardson (JAM)	15	11
Luis Montoya (MEX); Miriam Rodríguez (MEX)	21	21

Quarter-finals
1	Vinson Chiu (USA); Jennie Gai (USA)	21	21
Henry Huebla (ECU); María Zambrano (ECU)	8	8
4	Davi Silva (BRA); Sânia Lima (BRA)	21	23
Luis Montoya (MEX); Miriam Rodríguez (MEX)	15	21

Semi-finals
1	Vinson Chiu (USA); Jennie Gai (USA)	20	21	21
4	Davi Silva (BRA); Sânia Lima (BRA)	22	16	16

=== Bottom half ===
First round
Bradley Evans (JAM); Katherine Wynter (JAM)	10	15
Juan Bencomo (CUB); Yeily Ortiz (CUB)	21	21
Javier Alas (ESA); Fátima Centeno (ESA)	14	14
José Guevara (PER); Inés Castillo (PER)	21	21
Yonatan Linarez (DOM); Nairoby Jiménez (DOM)	7	19
Nicolás Oliva (ARG); Ailén Oliva (ARG)	21	21
Alonso Medel (CHI); Vania Díaz (CHI)	21	21
Frank Barrios (VEN); María Rojas (VEN)	17	14
Luis Garrido (MEX); Romina Fregoso (MEX)	21	21
Miguel Quirama (COL); Laura Londoño (COL)	18	8

Second round
Juan Bencomo (CUB); Yeily Ortiz (CUB)	17	23	12
José Guevara (PER); Inés Castillo (PER)	21	21	21
Nicolás Oliva (ARG); Ailén Oliva (ARG)	w	/	o
3	Fabrício Farias (BRA); Jaqueline Lima (BRA)
Alonso Medel (CHI); Vania Díaz (CHI)	21	21
Reece Marcano (TTO); Chequeda de Boulet (TTO)	15	18
Luis Garrido (MEX); Romina Fregoso (MEX)	7	11
2	Ty Alexander Lindeman (CAN); Josephine Wu (CAN)	21	21

Quarter-finals
José Guevara (PER); Inés Castillo (PER)	21	21
Nicolás Oliva (ARG); Ailen Oliva (ARG)	13	9
Alonso Medel (CHI); Vania Díaz (CHI)	5	7
2	Ty Alexander Lindeman (CAN); Josephine Wu (CAN)	21	21

Semi-finals
José Guevara (PER); Inés Castillo (PER)	10	11
2	Ty Alexander Lindeman (CAN); Josephine Wu (CAN)	21	21
