= Presley Smith =

Badminton player (born 2003)

Personal information
- Born: July 16, 2003 (age 23) Albany, New York, United States
- Height: 1.82 m (6 ft 0 in)

Sport
- Country: United States
- Sport: Badminton
- Handedness: Left

Men's & mixed doubles
- Highest ranking: 25 (MD with Chen Zhi-yi, May 26, 2026); 14 (XD with Jennie Gai, October 27, 2026)
- Current ranking: 30 (MD with Chen Zhi-yi); 20 (XD with Jennie Gai) (November 17, 2026)
- BWF profile
Medal record
Men's badminton
Representing United States
Pan American Championships
Gold medal – first place	2024 Guatemala City	Men's doubles
Gold medal – first place	2024 Guatemala City	Mixed doubles
Gold medal – first place	2025 Lima	Men's doubles
Gold medal – first place	2026 Lima	Men's doubles
Gold medal – first place	2026 Lima	Mixed doubles
Bronze medal – third place	2023 Kingston	Men's doubles
Bronze medal – third place	2025 Lima	Mixed doubles
Pan Am Mixed Team Championships
Silver medal – second place	2025 Aguascalientes	Mixed team
Pan Am Cup
Silver medal – second place	2026 Guatemala City	Men's team

Presley Smith (born July 16, 2003) is a badminton player from the United States.

== Early life ==
Smith was born in Albany, New York, and relocated with his family to Indianapolis, Indiana, at the age of one. When he was nine, the family moved to Baltimore, Maryland. His mother, who is of Taiwanese descent, played recreational badminton, while his father participated in wrestling and tennis.

Smith initially played tennis before transitioning to badminton around the age of nine or ten, training at a local club in Baltimore. He attended Baltimore Polytechnic Institute for high school. During his early junior career, Smith struggled in tournaments and frequently exited in the first round.

== Career ==
As Smith progressed to the under-19 age category, his tournament results began to improve. To pursue further badminton training, he opted to attend college and moved to Taipei, Taiwan, in 2021. Utilizing connections through his mother, he secured a tryout at a badminton team. He initially trained on weekends with the club's high school team before advancing to practice with the senior players.

Smith is a multiple-time Pan Am Champion. He won the men's doubles title twice with Chen Zhi-yi in 2024 and successfully defended the title a year later. He also won the mixed doubles title with his partner Allison Lee in 2024.

== Achievements ==
=== Pan Am Championships ===
Men's doubles
Year	Venue	Partner	Opponent	Score	Result
2023	G.C. Foster College of Physical Education and Sport; Kingston, Jamaica	(United States) Chen Zhi-yi	(Canada) Adam Dong (Canada) Nyl Yakura	21–17, 18–21, 16–21	Bronze
2024	Teodoro Palacios Flores Gymnasium; Guatemala City, Guatemala	(United States) Chen Zhi-yi	(Canada) Adam Dong (Canada) Nyl Yakura	21–14, 21–11	Gold
2025	Videna Poli 2 Lima, Peru	(United States) Chen Zhi-yi	(Brazil) Fabrício Farias (Brazil) Davi Silva	21–16, 21–6	Gold
2026	High Performance Center VIDENA, Lima, Peru	(United States) Chen Zhi-yi	(Canada) Kevin Lee (Canada) Ty Alexander Lindeman	21–13, 21–8	Gold

Mixed doubles
Year	Venue	Partner	Opponent	Score	Result
2024	Teodoro Palacios Flores Gymnasium; Guatemala City, Guatemala	(United States) Allison Lee	(United States) Vinson Chiu (United States) Jennie Gai	15–21, 21–15, 21–14	Gold
2025	Videna Poli 2 Lima, Peru	(United States) Jennie Gai	(Canada) Ty Alexander Lindeman (Canada) Josephine Wu	22–20, 17–21, 18–21	Bronze
2026	High Performance Center VIDENA, Lima, Peru	(United States) Jennie Gai	(Brazil) Davi Silva (Brazil) Sânia Lima	21–16, 21–15	Gold

=== BWF World Tour (2 runners-up) ===
The BWF World Tour, which was announced on 19 March 2017 and implemented in 2018, is a series of elite badminton tournaments sanctioned by the Badminton World Federation (BWF). The BWF World Tours are divided into levels of World Tour Finals, Super 1000, Super 750, Super 500, Super 300, and the BWF Tour Super 100.

Men's doubles
Year	Tournament	Level	Partner	Opponent	Score	Result
2024	Malaysia Super 100	Super 100	(United States) Chen Zhi-yi	(Malaysia) Ng Eng Cheong (Malaysia) Low Hang Yee	21–19, 15–21, 12–21	(silver) Runner-up

Mixed doubles
Year	Tournament	Level	Partner	Opponent	Score	Result
2025	Canada Open	Super 300	(United States) Jennie Gai	(Thailand) Ruttanapak Oupthong (Thailand) Jhenicha Sudjaipraparat	14–21, 17–21	(silver) Runner-up

=== BWF International (5 titles, 1 runner-up) ===
Men's doubles
Year	Tournament	Partner	Opponent	Score	Result
2023	Czech Open	(United States) Chen Zhi-yi	(Czech Republic) Adam Mendrek (Czech Republic) Ondřej Král	21–15, 21–11	(gold) Winner
2024	Canadian International	(United States) Chen Zhi-yi	(Canada) Kevin Lee (Canada) Ty Alexander Lindeman	21–11, 21–9	(gold) Winner
2025	Canadian International	(United States) Chen Zhi-yi	(Canada) Kevin Lee (Canada) Ty Alexander Lindeman	17–21, 21–15, 21–13	(gold) Winner

Mixed doubles
Year	Tournament	Partner	Opponent	Score	Result
2023	Saipan International	(United States) Allison Lee	(Chinese Taipei) Wei Chun-wei (Chinese Taipei) Nicole Gonzales Chan	20–22, 21–18, 21–14	(gold) Winner
2023	El Salvador International	(United States) Allison Lee	(Brazil) Davi Silva (Brazil) Sânia Lima	22–20, 21–18	(gold) Winner
2023	Canadian International	(United States) Allison Lee	(Indonesia) Rian Agung Saputro (Indonesia) Serena Kani	21–12, 8–21, 16–21	(silver) Runner-up

BWF International Challenge tournament
BWF International Series tournament
BWF Future Series tournament
