= 2024 Pan Am Badminton Championships =

Badminton tournament in Guatemala

Tournament details
- Dates: 10–13 April 2024
- Edition: 27th
- Venue: Teodoro Palacios Flores Gymnasium
- Location: Guatemala City, Guatemala

Champions
- Men's singles: (Guatemala) Kevin Cordón
- Women's singles: (United States) Beiwen Zhang
- Men's doubles: (United States) Chen Zhi-yi (United States) Presley Smith
- Women's doubles: (United States) Francesca Corbett (United States) Allison Lee
- Mixed doubles: (United States) Presley Smith (United States) Allison Lee

The XXVII 2024 Pan Am Badminton Championships was a continental championships tournament of badminton for the Americas. It was held in Guatemala City, Guatemala from 10 to 13 April.

== Tournament ==
The 2024 Pan Am Badminton Championships was the 27th edition of the Pan American Badminton Championships. The tournament was organized by the Federación de Bádminton de Guatemala with sanction from the Badminton Pan America.

=== Venue ===
This tournament was held at the Teodoro Palacios Flores Gymnasium in Guatemala City, Guatemala.

=== Point distribution ===
Below is the tables with the point distribution for each phase of the tournament based on the BWF points system for the Pan American Badminton Championships, which is equivalent to a Super 300 event.

Winner	Runner-up	3/4	5/8	9/16	17/32	33/64
7,000	5,950	4,900	3,850	2,750	1,670	660

== Medal summary ==
=== Medalists ===
Event	Gold	Silver	Bronze
Men's singles	(Guatemala) Kevin Cordón	(El Salvador) Uriel Canjura	(Canada) Brian Yang
Men's singles	(Guatemala) Kevin Cordón	(El Salvador) Uriel Canjura	(Brazil) Ygor Coelho
Women's singles	(United States) Beiwen Zhang	(Canada) Michelle Li	(Canada) Rachel Chan
Women's singles	(United States) Beiwen Zhang	(Canada) Michelle Li	(United States) Lauren Lam
Men's doubles	(United States) Chen Zhi-yi (United States) Presley Smith	(Canada) Adam Dong (Canada) Nyl Yakura	(United States) Vinson Chiu (United States) Joshua Yuan
Men's doubles	(United States) Chen Zhi-yi (United States) Presley Smith	(Canada) Adam Dong (Canada) Nyl Yakura	(Mexico) Job Castillo (Mexico) Luis Montoya
Women's doubles	(United States) Francesca Corbett (United States) Allison Lee	(United States) Annie Xu (United States) Kerry Xu	(Canada) Catherine Choi (Canada) Josephine Wu
Women's doubles	(United States) Francesca Corbett (United States) Allison Lee	(United States) Annie Xu (United States) Kerry Xu	(Brazil) Jaqueline Lima (Brazil) Sâmia Lima
Mixed doubles	(United States) Presley Smith (United States) Allison Lee	(United States) Vinson Chiu (United States) Jennie Gai	(Canada) Ty Alexander Lindeman (Canada) Josephine Wu
Mixed doubles	(United States) Presley Smith (United States) Allison Lee	(United States) Vinson Chiu (United States) Jennie Gai	(Brazil) Fabrício Farias (Brazil) Jaqueline Lima

=== Medal table ===
* Host nation (Guatemala)

Rank	Nation	Gold	Silver	Bronze	Total
1	United States	4	2	2	8
2	Guatemala*	1	0	0	1
3	Canada	0	2	4	6
4	El Salvador	0	1	0	1
5	Brazil	0	0	3	3
6	Mexico	0	0	1	1
Totals (6 entries)		5	5	10	20

== Men's singles ==
=== Seeds ===
1. (Canada) Brian Yang (semi-finals)
2. (Guatemala) Kevin Cordón (champion)
3. (Brazil) Ygor Coelho (semi-finals)
4. (El Salvador) Uriel Canjura (final)
5. (Brazil) Jonathan Matias (third round)
6. (Mexico) Luis Ramón Garrido (quarter-finals)
7. (United States) Howard Shu (quarter-finals)
8. (Canada) Victor Lai (quarter-finals)

=== Finals ===
Semi-finals
1	(Canada) Brian Yang	16	15
4	(El Salvador) Uriel Canjura	21	21
3	(Brazil) Ygor Coelho	19	19
2	(Guatemala) Kevin Cordón	21	21

Final
4	(El Salvador) Uriel Canjura	21	17	13
2	(Guatemala) Kevin Cordón	14	21	21

=== Top half ===
==== Section 1 ====
First round
(Costa Rica) G Cavallotti	13	19
(Guatemala) R Alonso	21	21
(Guatemala) Y del Cid	21	21
(United States) L Wang	13	15

Second round
1	(Canada) B Yang	w	/	o
(Cuba) L Dueñas
(Canada) B. R. Sankeerth
(Guatemala) R Alonso	w	/	o
5	(Brazil) J Matias	21	21
(Mexico) A Gaitan	12	14
(El Salvador) M Calzadilla	8	8
(Guatemala) Y del Cid	21	21

Third round
1	(Canada) B Yang	21	21
(Guatemala) R Alonso	13	10
5	(Brazil) J Matias	18	14
(Guatemala) Y del Cid	21	21

Quarter-finals
1	(Canada) B Yang	21	21
(Guatemala) Y del Cid	10	10

==== Section 2 ====
First round
(Peru) A Viale	21	21
(Barbados) K King	8	7
(Argentina) S Otero	8	15
(Brazil) D Silva	21	21

Second round
4	(El Salvador) U Canjura	21	26	21
(United States) K Walter	18	28	13
(Colombia) E Rodríguez	4	10
(Peru) A Viale	21	21
7	(United States) H Shu	21	21
(Colombia) M Quirama	16	7
(Cuba) J Bencomo
(Brazil) D Silva	w	/	o

Third round
4	(El Salvador) U Canjura	21	21
(Peru) A Viale	17	15
7	(United States) H Shu	21	21
(Brazil) D Silva	17	16

Quarter-finals
4	(El Salvador) U Canjura	21	21
7	(United States) H Shu	16	12

=== Bottom half ===
==== Section 3 ====
First round
(United States) E Asuncion	21	21
(Colombia) D Marulanda	11	13
(El Salvador) J Alas	21	21
(Peru) S Durand	15	11
(Cuba) R Herrera
(Jamaica) S Ricketts	w	/	o

Second round
(United States) E Asuncion	21	21
(Costa Rica) T Fujisawa	7	6
(El Salvador) J Alas	21	8	15
6	(Mexico) L Garrido	10	21	21
(Jamaica) S Ricketts	21	21
(El Salvador) M Mejía	13	9
(Brazil) D Oliveira	19	15
3	(Brazil) Y Coelho	21	21

Third round
(United States) E Asuncion	13	9
6	(Mexico) L Garrido	21	21
(Jamaica) S Ricketts	10	6
3	(Brazil) Y Coelho	21	21

Quarter-finals
6	(Mexico) L Garrido	21	16	16
3	(Brazil) Y Coelho	19	21	21

==== Section 4 ====
First round
(Colombia) E Barrientos	14	9
(Peru) K Kuan-Veng	21	21
(Argentina) N Oliva	21	19	21
(Guatemala) D López	12	21	6

Second round
(Peru) K Kuan-Veng	11	21	17
(Paraguay) L Lee	21	17	21
(Canada) I Wadia	21	19	8
8	(Canada) V Lai	17	21	21
(Argentina) N Oliva	16	17
(Guatemala) J Ochoa	21	21
(Guatemala) D Trujillo	11	6
2	(Guatemala) K Cordon	21	21

Third round
(Paraguay) L Lee	10	14
8	(Canada) V Lai	21	21
(Guatemala) J Ochoa	11	11
2	(Guatemala) K Cordon	21	21

Quarter-finals
8	(Canada) V Lai	15	21	10
2	(Guatemala) K Cordon	21	16	21

== Women's singles ==
=== Seeds ===
1. (United States) Beiwen Zhang (champion)
2. (Canada) Michelle Li (final)
3. (Brazil) Juliana Vieira (quarter-finals)
4. (Canada) Wenyu Zhang (quarter-finals)
5. (United States) Lauren Lam (semi-finals)
6. (Peru) Inés Castillo (third round)
7. (Canada) Rachel Chan (semi-finals)
8. (Canada) Talia Ng (withdrew)

=== Finals ===
Semi-finals
1	(United States) Beiwen Zhang	21	21
7	(Canada) Rachel Chan	15	15
5	(United States) Lauren Lam	18	18
2	(Canada) Michelle Li	21	21

Final
1	(United States) Beiwen Zhang	21	18	21
2	(Canada) Michelle Li	18	21	17

=== Top half ===
==== Section 1 ====
First round

Second round
1	(United States) B Zhang	21	21
(Costa Rica) C Villarreal	4	5
(El Salvador) G Barrios	6	7
(Brazil) J Alves	21	21
8	(Canada) T Ng
(Argentina) I Gualdi	w	/	o
(Cuba) L Contreras
(Guatemala) A Barrios	w	/	o

Third round
1	(United States) B Zhang	21	21
(Brazil) J Alves	15	14
(Argentina) I Gualdi	24	21
(Guatemala) A Barrios	22	13

Quarter-finals
1	(United States) B Zhang	21	21
(Argentina) I Gualdi	12	8

==== Section 2 ====
First round
(Peru) N Miyahira	15	17
(United States) S Gurazada	21	21

Second round
4	(Canada) W Y Zhang	21	21
(El Salvador) M Revelo	5	10
(Peru) F Munar	21	21
(Colombia) K Patiño	12	13
7	(Canada) R Chan	21	21
(Mexico) V Contreras	6	11
(Jamaica) T Richardson	21	21
(United States) S Gurazada	17	19

Third round
4	(Canada) W Y Zhang	18	21	22
(Peru) F Munar	21	7	20
7	(Canada) R Chan	21	21
(Jamaica) T Richardson	11	4

Quarter-finals
4	(Canada) W Y Zhang	16	3^{r}
7	(Canada) R Chan	21	13

=== Bottom half ===
==== Section 3 ====
First round

Second round

Third round

Quarter-finals

==== Section 4 ====
First round

Second round

Third round

Quarter-finals

== Men's doubles ==
=== Seeds ===
1. (Canada) Adam Dong / Nyl Yakura (final)
2. (Canada) Kevin Lee / Ty Alexander Lindeman (second round)
3. (United States) Vinson Chiu / Joshua Yuan (semi-finals)
4. (Mexico) Job Castillo / Luis Montoya (semi-finals)

=== Finals ===
Semi-finals
1	(Canada) Adam Dong (Canada) Nyl Yakura	21	19	21
3	(United States) Vinson Chiu (United States) Joshua Yuan	15	21	17
4	(Mexico) Job Castillo (Mexico) Luis Montoya	21	13	10
(United States) Chen Zhi-yi (United States) Presley Smith	15	21	21

Final
1	(Canada) Adam Dong (Canada) Nyl Yakura	14	11
(United States) Chen Zhi-yi (United States) Presley Smith	21	21

=== Top half ===
==== Section 1 ====
First round
(El Salvador) M Vides (El Salvador) M Mejia	19	14
(Brazil) I Batalha (Brazil) M Voigt	21	21

Second round
1	(Canada) A Dong (Canada) N Yakura	21	21
(Colombia) E Barrientos (Colombia) M Quirama	11	10
(Guatemala) R Alonso (Guatemala) J Ochoa	12	18
(Brazil) I Batalha (Brazil) M Voigt	21	21

Quarter-finals
1	(Canada) A Dong (Canada) N Yakura	21	22
(Brazil) I Batalha (Brazil) M Voigt	15	20

==== Section 2 ====
First round
(Guatemala) C Martínez (Guatemala) J Solís	w	/	o
(Cuba) L Dueñas (Cuba) D Palacios

Second round
3	(United States) V Chiu (United States) J Yuan	21	21
(Costa Rica) G Cavallotti (Costa Rica) T Fujisawa	6	8
(Peru) D Subauste (Peru) A Viale	21	21
(Guatemala) C Martínez (Guatemala) J Solís	17	17

Quarter-finals
3	(United States) V Chiu (United States) J Yuan	21	21
(Peru) D Subauste (Peru) A Viale	14	10

=== Bottom half ===
==== Section 3 ====
First round
(Guatemala) N Oliva (Guatemala) S Otero	21	21
(Peru) S Durand (Peru) K Kuan-Veng	14	14

Second round
(Guatemala) N Oliva (Guatemala) S Otero
(El Salvador) J Alas (El Salvador) M Calzadilla	w	/	o
(Cuba) J Otaño (Cuba) R Vazquez
4	(Mexico) J Castillo (Mexico) L Montoya	w	/	o

Quarter-finals
(El Salvador) J Alas (El Salvador) M Calzadilla	8	10
4	(Mexico) J Castillo (Mexico) L Montoya	21	21

==== Section 4 ====
First round
(Guatemala) J Granados (Guatemala) A Ortíz	21	21
(Colombia) J Berdugo (Colombia) D Marulanda	10	16

Second round
(Guatemala) J Granados (Guatemala) A Ortíz	16	22
(Brazil) F Farias (Brazil) D Silva	21	24
(United States) Chen Z-y (United States) P Smith	21	21	21
2	(Canada) K Lee (Canada) T A Lindeman	23	15	16

Quarter-finals
(Brazil) F Farias (Brazil) D Silva	20	21	12
(United States) Chen Z-y (United States) P Smith	22	14	21

== Women's doubles ==
=== Seeds ===
1. (Canada) Catherine Choi / Josephine Wu (semi-finals)
2. (United States) Annie Xu / Kerry Xu (final)
3. (United States) Francesca Corbett / Allison Lee (champions)
4. (Brazil) Jaqueline Lima / Sâmia Lima (semi-finals)

=== Finals ===
Semi-finals
1	(Canada) Catherine Choi (Canada) Josephine Wu	18	15
3	(United States) Francesca Corbett (United States) Allison Lee	21	21
4	(Brazil) Jaqueline Lima (Brazil) Sâmia Lima	13	14
2	(United States) Annie Xu (United States) Kerry Xu	21	21

Final
3	(United States) Francesca Corbett (United States) Allison Lee	21	21
2	(United States) Annie Xu (United States) Kerry Xu	14	15

=== Top half ===
==== Section 1 ====
First round

Second round
1	(Canada) C Choi (Canada) J Wu	21	21
(Argentina) I Gualdi (Argentina) A Oliva	9	5
(Brazil) J Alves (Brazil) T Santos	12	14
(Mexico) R Fregoso (Mexico) M Rodríguez	21	21

Quarter-finals
1	(Canada) C Choi (Canada) J Wu	21	21
(Mexico) R Fregoso (Mexico) M Rodríguez	17	16

==== Section 2 ====
First round
(El Salvador) G Barrios (El Salvador) M Revelo	6	12
(Guatemala) D Corleto (Guatemala) M Paiz	21	21

Second round
3	(United States) F Corbett (United States) A Lee	w	/	o
(Cuba) L Contreras (Cuba) T Oropesa
(Peru) I Castillo (Peru) N Miyahira	21	21
(Guatemala) D Corleto (Guatemala) M Paiz	16	16

Quarter-finals
3	(United States) F Corbett (United States) A Lee	21	21
(Peru) I Castillo (Peru) N Miyahira	11	7

=== Bottom half ===
==== Section 3 ====
First round
(Colombia) J Giraldo (Colombia) K Patiño	6	14
(Canada) J Chow (Canada) E Zhang	21	21

Second round
(Canada) J Chow (Canada) E Zhang	21	21
(El Salvador) F Centeno (El Salvador) D Hernández	13	17
(Mexico) H Gaitan (Mexico) S Solis	18	19
4	(Brazil) J Lima (Brazil) S Lima	21	21

Quarter-finals
(Canada) J Chow (Canada) E Zhang	18	21	14
4	(Brazil) J Lima (Brazil) S Lima	21	18	21

==== Section 4 ====
First round

Second round
(Guatemala) A Barrios (Guatemala) F Gutiérrez	12	9
(Peru) F Munar (Peru) R Munar	21	21
(Guatemala) M Palacios (Guatemala) L Santizo	5	3
2	(United States) A Xu (United States) K Xu	21	21

Quarter-finals
(Peru) F Munar (Peru) R Munar	11	11
2	(United States) A Xu (United States) K Xu	21	21

== Mixed doubles ==
=== Seeds ===
1. (Canada) Ty Alexander Lindeman / Josephine Wu (semi-finals)
2. (United States) Vinson Chiu / Jennie Gai (final)
3. (United States) Presley Smith / Allison Lee (champions)
4. (Brazil) Fabrício Farias / Jaqueline Lima (semi-finals)

=== Finals ===
Semi-finals
1	(Canada) Ty Alexander Lindeman (Canada) Josephine Wu	11	16
3	(United States) Presley Smith (United States) Allison Lee	21	21
4	(Brazil) Fabrício Farias (Brazil) Jaqueline Lima	15	19
2	(United States) Vinson Chiu (United States) Jennie Gai	21	21

Final
3	(United States) Presley Smith (United States) Allison Lee	15	21	21
2	(United States) Vinson Chiu (United States) Jennie Gai	21	15	14

=== Top half ===
==== Section 1 ====
First round
(El Salvador) M Mancía (El Salvador) M Revelo	16	12
(Guatemala) C Martínez (Guatemala) M Paiz	21	21
(Colombia) D Marulanda (Colombia) K Patiño	11	18
(Brazil) D Silva (Brazil) S Lima	21	21
(Mexico) L Montoya (Mexico) M Rodríguez	21	21
(Guatemala) D Trujillo (Guatemala) L Santizo	6	5

Second round
1	(Canada) T A Lindeman (Canada) J Wu	21	17	21
(Guatemala) C Martínez (Guatemala) M Paiz	16	21	18
(Brazil) D Silva (Brazil) S Lima	21	18	19
(Mexico) L Montoya (Mexico) M Rodríguez	11	21	21

Quarter-finals
1	(Canada) T A Lindeman (Canada) J Wu	21	21
(Mexico) L Montoya (Mexico) M Rodríguez	14	16

==== Section 2 ====
First round
(Argentina) N Oliva (Argentina) A Oliva	21	21
(Colombia) E Rodríguez (Colombia) J Giraldo	18	14
(Brazil) I Batalha (Brazil) J Alves
(Cuba) R Herrera (Cuba) L Contreras	w	/	o
(Canada) I Wadia (Canada) J Chow	21	21
(Peru) K Kuan-Veng (Peru) F Munar	19	15

Second round
3	(United States) P Smith (United States) A Lee
FWDN	(Argentina) N Oliva (Argentina) A Oliva	w	/	o
(Brazil) I Batalha (Brazil) J Alves
(Canada) I Wadia (Canada) J Chow

Quarter-finals
3	(United States) P Smith (United States) A Lee	21	21
(Brazil) I Batalha (Brazil) J Alves	13	12

=== Bottom half ===
==== Section 3 ====
First round
(Guatemala) J Ochoa (Guatemala) F Gutiérrez	12	16
(Brazil) M Voigt (Brazil) T Santos	21	21
(Colombia) J Berdugo (Colombia) A Higuita	5	11
(Peru) S Durand (Peru) N Miyahira	21	21
(Peru) D Subauste (Peru) R Munar	12	6
(Canada) J Lai (Canada) C Lai	21	21
(Guatemala) R Alonso (Guatemala) A Barrios	7	10
4	(Brazil) F Farias (Brazil) J Lima	21	21

Second round
(Brazil) M Voigt (Brazil) T Santos	21	19	21
(Peru) S Durand (Peru) N Miyahira	18	21	14
(Canada) J Lai (Canada) C Lai	22	16
4	(Brazil) F Farias (Brazil) J Lima	24	21

Quarter-finals
(Brazil) M Voigt (Brazil) T Santos	8	11
4	(Brazil) F Farias (Brazil) J Lima	21	21

==== Section 4 ====
First round
(Costa Rica) G Cavallotti (Costa Rica) C Villarreal
(Cuba) J Bencomo (Cuba) T Oropesa	w	/	o
(El Salvador) M Calzadilla (El Salvador) G Barrios	5	11
(Canada) K Lee (Canada) E Zhang	21	21
(Argentina) S Otero (Argentina) I Gualdi	15	8
(United States) Chen Z-y (United States) F Corbett	21	21

Second round
(Costa Rica) G Cavallotti (Costa Rica) C Villarreal	6	11
(Canada) K Lee (Canada) E Zhang	21	21
(United States) Chen Z-y (United States) F Corbett	14	19
2	(United States) V Chiu (United States) J Gai	21	21

Quarter-finals
(Canada) K Lee (Canada) E Zhang	15	19
2	(United States) V Chiu (United States) J Gai	21	21
