= Francesca Corbett =

American badminton player (born 2005)

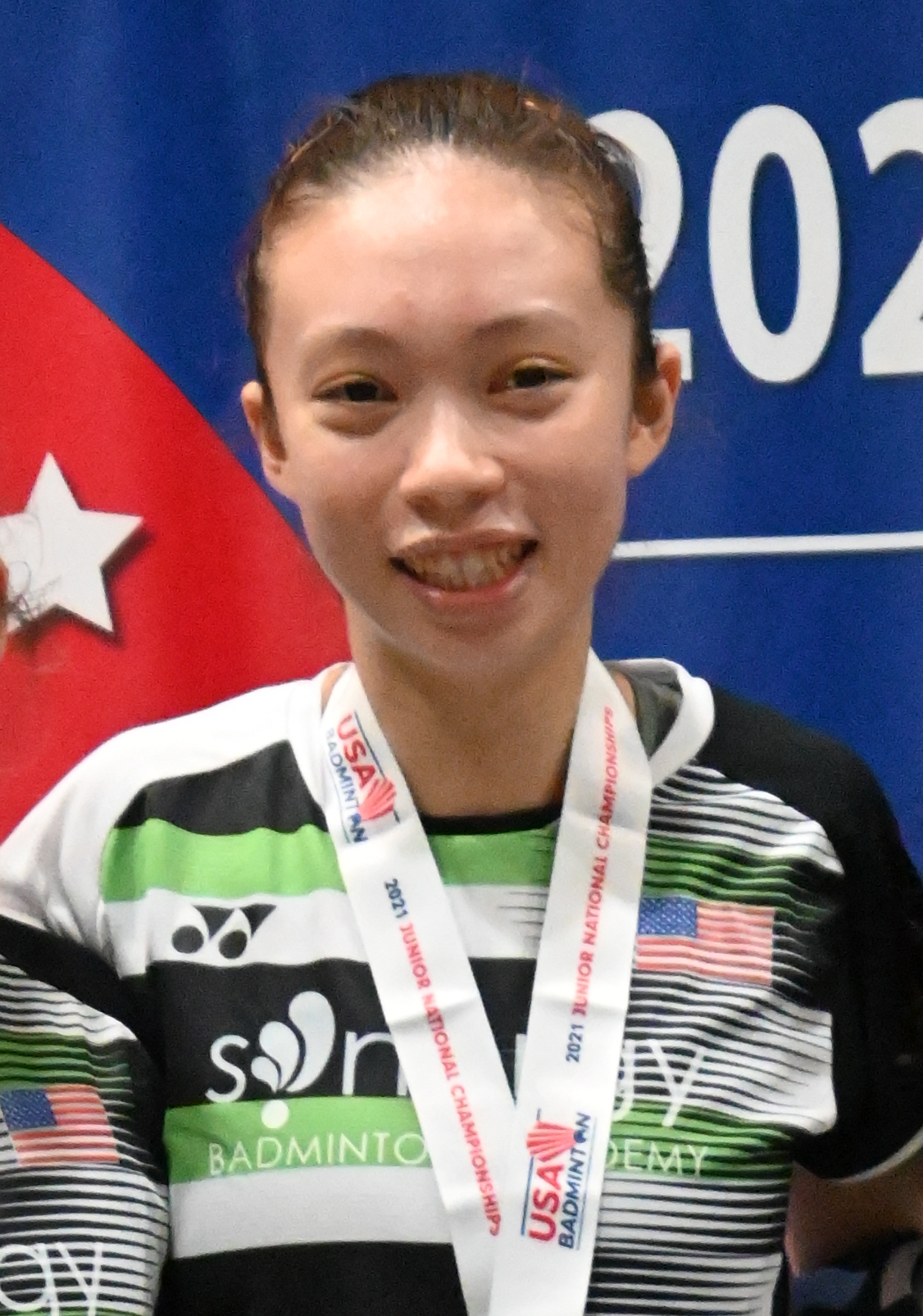
- Corbett at the 2021 Junior National Championships

Personal information
- Nickname: Frankie
- Born: Francesca Autumn Corbett; June 3, 2005 (age 21) Foster City, California, United States

Sport
- Country: United States
- Sport: Badminton
- Handedness: Right

Women's & mixed doubles
- Highest ranking: 24 (WD with Jennie Gai, April 14, 2026); 25 (WD with Allison Lee, March 4, 2025); 43 (XD with Chen Zhi-yi, September 29, 2026)
- Current ranking: 24 (WD with Jennie Gai); 39 (XD with Chen Zhi-yi) (November 3, 2026)
- BWF profile
Medal record
Women's badminton
Representing the United States
Pan American Championships
Gold medal – first place	2024 Guatemala City	Women's doubles
Silver medal – second place	2021 Guatemala City	Women's doubles
Silver medal – second place	2023 Kingston	Women's doubles
Silver medal – second place	2026 Lima	Women's doubles
Bronze medal – third place	2022 San Salvador	Women's doubles
Bronze medal – third place	2026 Lima	Mixed doubles
Pan Am Female Cup
Gold medal – first place	2022 Acapulco	Women's team
Silver medal – second place	2020 Salvador	Women's team
Silver medal – second place	2024 São Paulo	Women's team
Silver medal – second place	2026 Guatemala City	Women's team
World Junior Championships
Silver medal – second place	2023 Spokane	Women's doubles
Pan Am Junior Championships
Gold medal – first place	2021 Acapulco	Women's doubles
Gold medal – first place	2021 Acapulco	Mixed team

Francesca Autumn Corbett (born June 3, 2005) is an American badminton player.

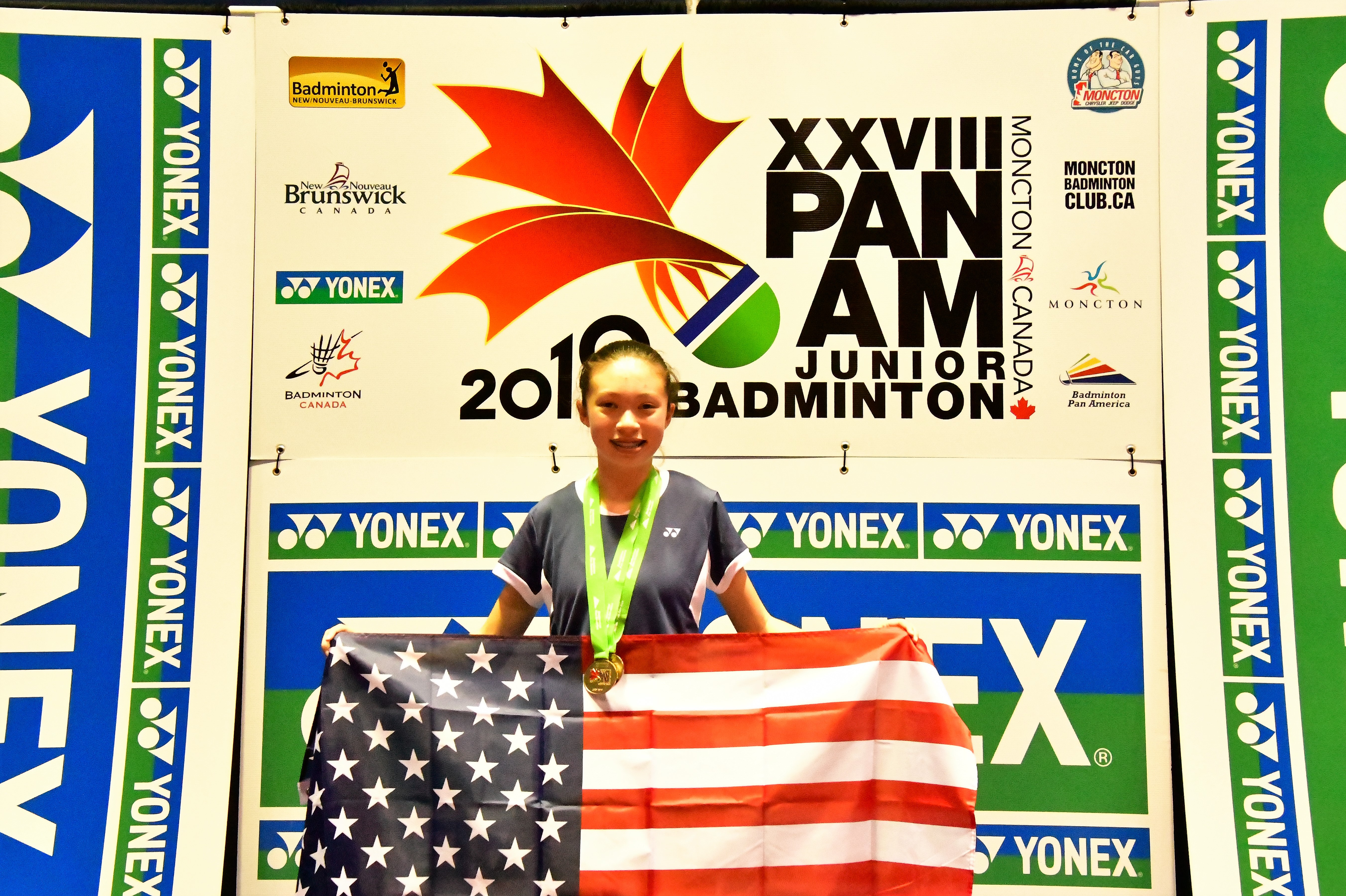
Corbett at the podium of U–15 Pan Am Junior Championships in Moncton, Canada in 2019

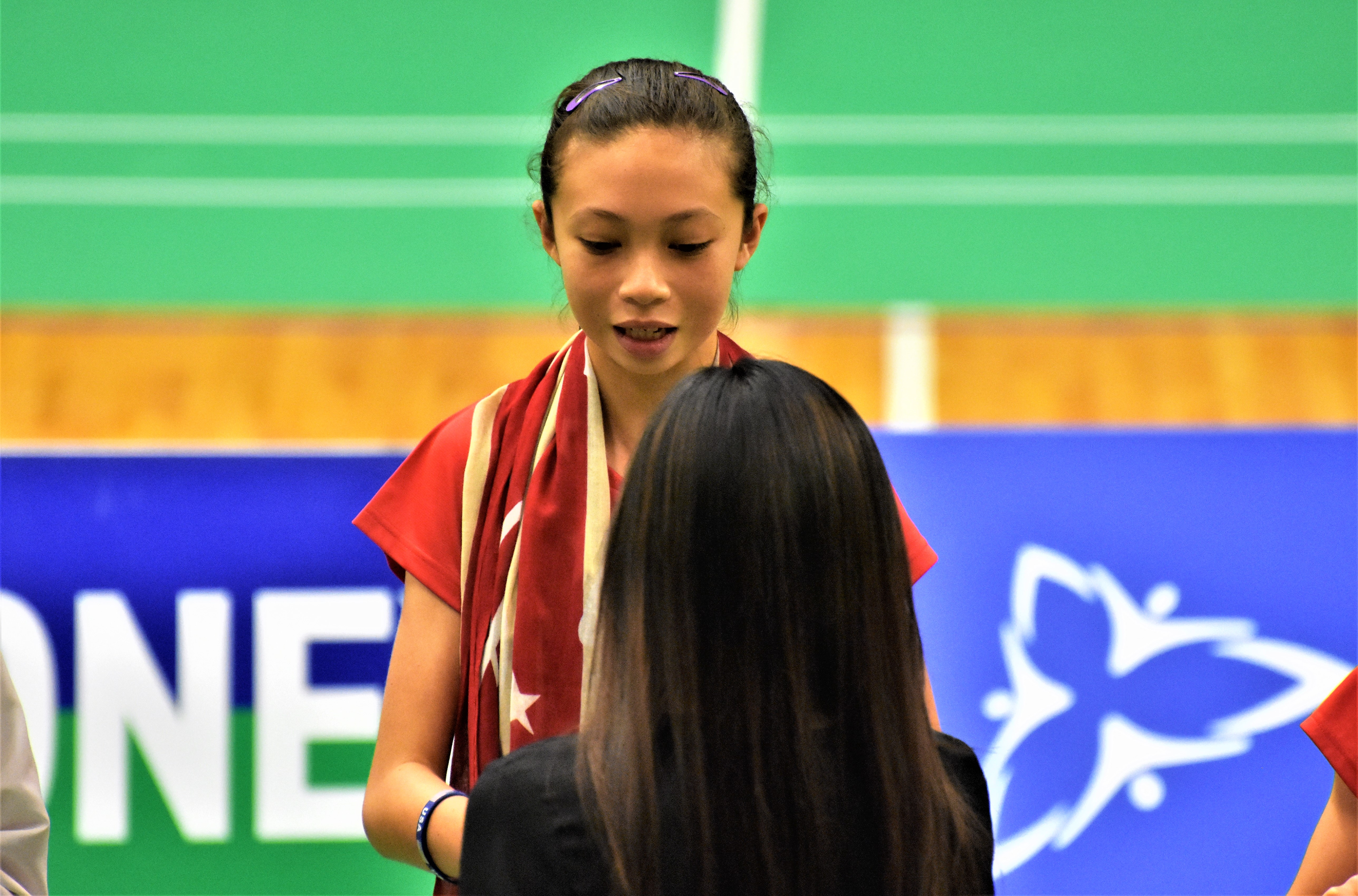
Corbett wins gold for girls' singles and doubles at the U–13 Pan Am Junior Championships in Ontario, Canada

== Career ==
Corbett has been competing in badminton since she was six. She won gold medals in girls' singles and doubles events for U11, U15 and U17 categories at the Pan Am Junior Championships in 2015, 2017, and 2019 respectively. In late 2019, Corbett and her partner Allison Lee won the National Adult Championships women's doubles title, becoming the youngest pair to ever be crowned as national champions. She was then chosen to represent the USA's women's team at the 2020 Pan Am Male & Female Cup in February. The team bagged silver after losing to Canada in the final.

=== 2021 ===
In May, Corbett and Lee entered the final of 2021 Pan Am Championships and finished as runners-up. In the following month, she competed in the National Junior Championships. She won gold in the girls' doubles U19 event with Lee, another gold in the mixed doubles U17 event with Samuel Li, as well as a bronze in the girls' singles U19 event.

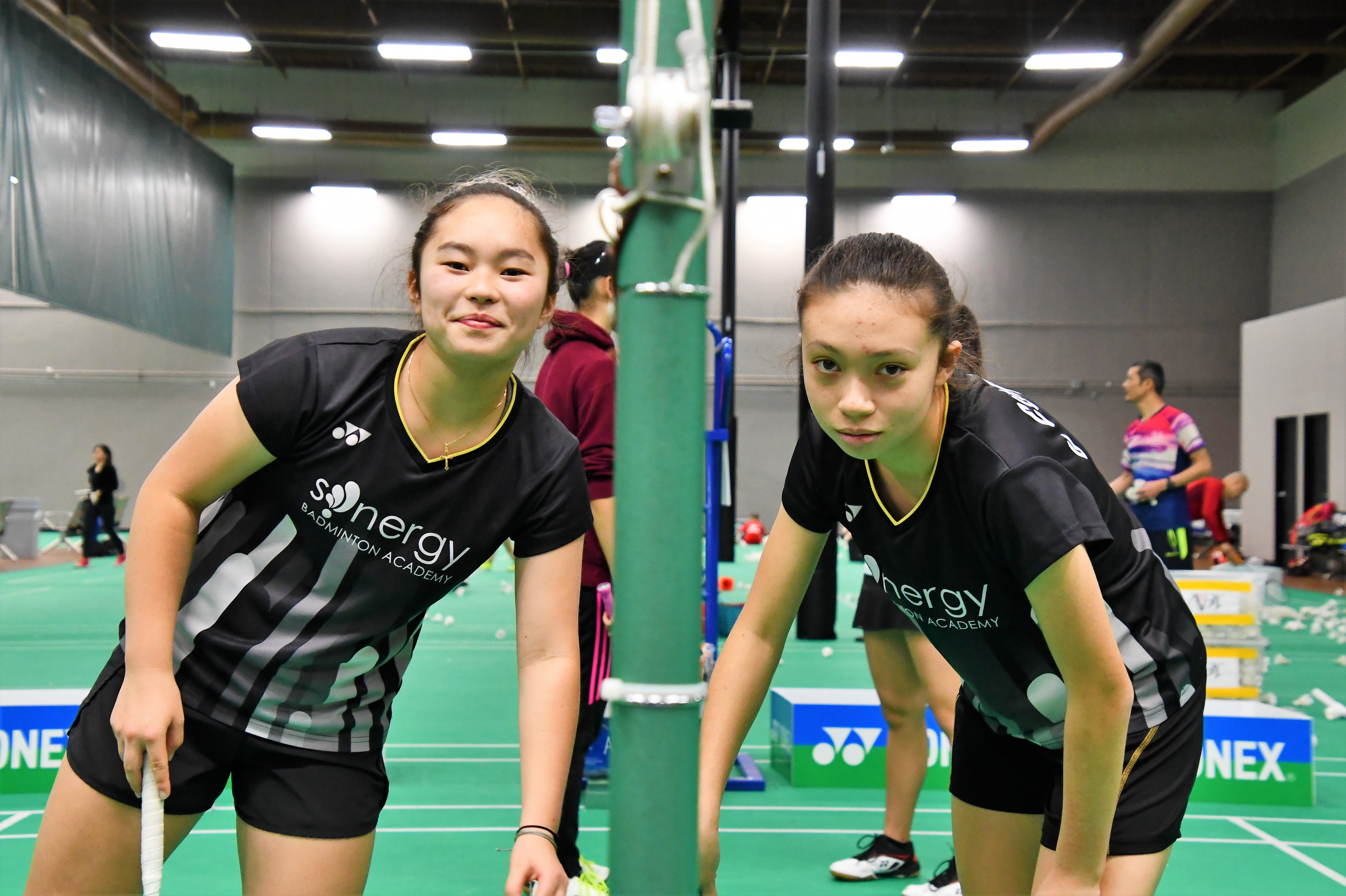
2019 National Adult Champions Allison Lee and Francesca Corbett

In July, Corbett helped team USA to win gold in the mixed team event at the 2021 Pan Am Junior Championships. She then won gold with Lee in the women's doubles U19 event. She also picked up bronze in the mixed doubles U17 event partnering Li. In September, Corbett and Lee captured their first senior career title at the Guatemala International.

=== 2022 ===
Corbett was part of the USA's women's team that won gold at the 2022 Pan Am Male & Female Cup in February. In April, she and Lee won a bronze medal at the 2022 Pan Am Championships. In August, they made their World Championships debut at the 2022 World Championships.

=== 2023 ===
In April, Corbett and Lee clinched their second silver medal at the 2023 Pan Am Championships. They also reached the final of the Mexican International the following week. In October, the duo made history by becoming the first player or pair from the US to earn a World Junior Championships medal when they reached the girls' doubles semi-final at the 2023 World Junior Championships. They went on to win silver, falling to Japan's Maya Taguchi and Aya Tamaki in the final.

=== 2025 ===
Corbett partnered with Jennie Gai beginning in 2025. The pair achieved a breakthrough result at the Australian Open in November, reaching the semifinals of a BWF World Tour Super 500 tournament for the first time—a rare accomplishment for a United States women's doubles pair. In the quarterfinals, the world No. 38 ranked duo rallied from a first-game loss to defeat 29th-ranked Hu Ling Fang and Jheng Yu Chieh of Chinese Taipei 10–21, 21–10, 21–12. They were eliminated in the semifinals by Indonesia's Rachel Allessya Rose and Febi Setianingrum, losing 18–21, 19–21.

== Achievements ==
=== Pan Am Championships ===
Women's doubles
Year	Venue	Partner	Opponent	Score	Result
2021	Sagrado Corazon de Jesus, Guatemala City, Guatemala	(United States) Allison Lee	(Canada) Rachel Honderich (Canada) Kristen Tsai	12–21, 7–21	Silver
2022	Palacio de los Deportes Carlos "El Famoso" Hernández; San Salvador, El Salvador	(United States) Allison Lee	(Canada) Catherine Choi (Canada) Josephine Wu	18–21, 13–21	Bronze
2023	G.C. Foster College of Physical Education and Sport, Kingston, Jamaica	(United States) Allison Lee	(Canada) Catherine Choi (Canada) Josephine Wu	14–21, 18–21	Silver
2024	Teodoro Palacios Flores Gymnasium, Guatemala City, Guatemala	(United States) Allison Lee	(United States) Annie Xu (United States) Kerry Xu	21–14, 21–15	Gold
2026	High Performance Center VIDENA, Lima, Peru	(United States) Jennie Gai	(United States) Lauren Lam (United States) Allison Lee	18–21, 18–21	Silver

Mixed doubles
Year	Venue	Partner	Opponent	Score	Result
2026	High Performance Center VIDENA, Lima, Peru	(United States) Chen Zhi-yi	(Brazil) Davi Silva (Brazil) Sânia Lima	18–21, 19–21	Bronze

=== World Junior Championships ===
Girls' doubles
Year	Venue	Partner	Opponent	Score	Result
2023	The Podium, Spokane, United States	(United States) Allison Lee	(Japan) Maya Taguchi (Japan) Aya Tamaki	21–12, 13–21, 15–21	Silver

=== Pan Am Junior Championships ===
Girls' doubles
Year	Venue	Partner	Opponent	Score	Result
2021	Hotel Mundo Imperial; Acapulco, Mexico	(United States) Allison Lee	(United States) Joline Siu (United States) Kalea Sheung	21–12, 21–5	Gold

=== BWF International Challenge/Series (2 titles, 2 runners-up) ===
Women's doubles
Year	Tournament	Partner	Opponent	Score	Result
2021	Guatemala International	(United States) Allison Lee	(Guatemala) Ana González (Guatemala) Karolina Orellana	21–12, 21–4	(gold) Winner
2023	Mexican International	(United States) Allison Lee	(Japan) Sayaka Hobara (Japan) Yui Suizu	11–21, 21–23	(silver) Runner-up
2023	El Salvador International	(United States) Allison Lee	(United States) Annie Xu (United States) Kerry Xu	21–18, 21–11	(gold) Winner
2024	Uganda International	(United States) Allison Lee	(United States) Paula Lynn Cao Hok (United States) Lauren Lam	21–19, 18–21, 15–21	(silver) Runner-up

BWF International Challenge tournament
BWF International Series tournament
BWF Future Series tournament
