= Vinson Chiu =

American badminton player (born 1998)

Vinson Chiu 邱愷翔
Personal information
- Born: August 8, 1998 (age 28) Newport Beach, California, U.S.
- Height: 6 ft 0 in (183 cm)

Sport
- Country: United States
- Sport: Badminton
- Handedness: Right

Men's & mixed doubles
- Highest ranking: 41 (MD with Joshua Yuan, May 21, 2024); 29 (XD with Jennie Gai, July 18, 2023)
- BWF profile
Medal record
Men's badminton
Representing the United States
Pan American Games
Silver medal – second place	2023 Santiago	Mixed doubles
Pan Am Championships
Silver medal – second place	2022 San Salvador	Men's doubles
Silver medal – second place	2024 Guatemala City	Mixed doubles
Bronze medal – third place	2023 Kingston	Men's doubles
Bronze medal – third place	2024 Guatemala City	Men's doubles
Pan Am Men's Team Championships
Bronze medal – third place	2020 Salvador	Men's team
Pan Am Mixed Team Championships
Silver medal – second place	2023 Guadalajara	Mixed team
Bronze medal – third place	2017 Santo Domingo	Mixed team
Pan Am Junior Championships
Gold medal – first place	2015 Tijuana	Mixed team
Silver medal – second place	2016 Lima	Mixed doubles
Bronze medal – third place	2015 Tijuana	Boys' doubles
Bronze medal – third place	2015 Tijuana	Mixed doubles
Bronze medal – third place	2016 Lima	Mixed team
Bronze medal – third place	2016 Lima	Boys' doubles

Vinson Chiu (/ˈvɪnsən ˈtʃuː/ VIN-sən CHOO; born August 8, 1998) is an American badminton player. He won a silver medal with his partner Joshua Yuan in the men's doubles at the 2022 Pan Am Championships. Chiu also won a silver and a bronze at the 2016 Pan Am Junior Championships in the boys' doubles and mixed doubles. Chiu currently plays mixed doubles with Jennie Gai. They won their first title together at the Mexican International Challenge in 2021. The duo won the silver medal in the mixed doubles at the 2023 Pan American Games.

Chiu also once partnered with Indonesian legend Tony Gunawan, and they went on to win the U.S. International in 2017.

== Achievements ==
=== Pan American Games ===
Mixed doubles
Year	Venue	Partner	Opponent	Score	Result
2023	Olympic Training Center; Santiago, Chile	(United States) Jennie Gai	(Canada) Ty Alexander Lindeman (Canada) Josephine Wu	21–17, 17–21, 19–21	Silver

=== Pan Am Championships ===
Men's doubles
Year	Venue	Partner	Opponent	Score	Result
2022	Palacio de los Deportes Carlos "El Famoso" Hernández; San Salvador, El Salvador	(United States) Joshua Yuan	(Mexico) Job Castillo (Mexico) Luis Montoya	20–22, 8–11^{r}	Silver
2023	G.C. Foster College of Physical Education and Sport; Kingston, Jamaica	(United States) Joshua Yuan	(Canada) Kevin Lee (Canada) Ty Alexander Lindeman	17–21, 21–23	Bronze
2024	Teodoro Palacios Flores Gymnasium; Guatemala City, Guatemala	(United States) Joshua Yuan	(Canada) Adam Dong (Canada) Nyl Yakura	15–21, 21–19, 17–21	Bronze

Mixed doubles
Year	Venue	Partner	Opponent	Score	Result
2024	Teodoro Palacios Flores Gymnasium; Guatemala City, Guatemala	(United States) Jennie Gai	(United States) Presley Smith (United States) Allison Lee	21–15, 15–21, 14–21	Silver

=== Pan Am Junior Championships ===
Boys' doubles
Year	Venue	Partner	Opponent	Score	Result
2015	Centro de Alto Rendimiento; Tijuana, Mexico	(United States) Raymond Hsia	(Canada) Austin Bauer (Canada) Ty Alexander Lindeman	24–22, 10–21, 15–21	Bronze
2016	CAR la Videna; Lima, Peru	(United States) Brian Duong	(United States) Ricky Liuzhou (United States) Cadmus Yeo	13–21, 21–14, 17–21	Bronze

Mixed doubles
Year	Venue	Partner	Opponent	Score	Result
2015	Centro de Alto Rendimiento; Tijuana, Mexico	(United States) Crystal Pan	(Canada) Jason Ho-Shue (Canada) Qingzi Ouyang	15–21, 5–21	Bronze
2016	CAR la Videna; Lima, Peru	(United States) Jamie Hsu	(Canada) Brian Yang (Canada) Katie Ho-Shue	14–21, 14–21	Silver

=== BWF International Challenge/Series (8 titles, 9 runners-up) ===
Men's doubles
Year	Tournament	Partner	Opponent	Score	Result
2017	U.S. International	(United States) Tony Gunawan	(Germany) Daniel Benz (Germany) Andreas Heinz	16–21, 21–14, 21–14	(gold) Winner
2021	Mexican International	(United States) Enrico Asuncion	(Mexico) Job Castillo (Mexico) Luis Montoya	16–21, 14–21	(silver) Runner-up
2022	Mexican International	(United States) Joshua Yuan	(Czech Republic) Ondřej Král (Czech Republic) Adam Mendrek	20–22, 19–21	(silver) Runner-up
2023	El Salvador International	(United States) Joshua Yuan	(Canada) Kevin Lee (Canada) Ty Alexander Lindeman	15–21, 18–21	(silver) Runner-up
2024	Uganda International	(United States) Joshua Yuan	(India) Arjun M. R. (India) Dhruv Kapila	14–21, 13–21	(silver) Runner-up

Mixed doubles
Year	Tournament	Partner	Opponent	Score	Result
2019	Uganda International	(United States) Breanna Chi	(United States) Howard Shu (United States) Paula Lynn Obañana	9–21, 12–21	(silver) Runner-up
2019	Jamaica International	(United States) Breanna Chi	(Brazil) Artur Pomoceno (Brazil) Lohaynny Vicente	17–21, 21–14, 19–21	(silver) Runner-up
2019	Peru International	(United States) Breanna Chi	(Cuba) Osleni Guerrero (Cuba) Tahimara Oropeza	22–20, 21–9	(gold) Winner
2019	Mauritius International	(United States) Breanna Chi	(United States) Howard Shu (United States) Paula Lynn Obañana	21–17, 21–16	(gold) Winner
2021	Mexican International	(United States) Jennie Gai	(Mexico) Luis Montoya (Mexico) Vanessa Villalobos	21–17, 21–18	(gold) Winner
2021	Mexican International	(United States) Jennie Gai	(Canada) Nicolas Nguyen (Canada) Alexandra Mocanu	21–13, 21–11	(gold) Winner
2022	Mexican International	(United States) Jennie Gai	(Japan) Naoki Yamada (Japan) Moe Ikeuchi	15–21, 21–18, 10–21	(silver) Runner-up
2022	Peru Challenge	(United States) Jennie Gai	(Canada) Ty Alexander Lindeman (Canada) Josephine Wu	22–20, 13–21, 23–21	(gold) Winner
2022	Mexican International	(United States) Jennie Gai	(United States) Joshua Yuan (United States) Allison Lee	21–14, 22–24, 23–21	(gold) Winner
2023	Mexican International	(United States) Jennie Gai	(Canada) Ty Alexander Lindeman (Canada) Josephine Wu	22–20, 21–16	(gold) Winner
2023	Maldives International	(United States) Jennie Gai	(Malaysia) Hoo Pang Ron (Malaysia) Teoh Mei Xing	13–21, 18–21	(silver) Runner-up
2023	Peru Challenge	(United States) Jennie Gai	(Canada) Ty Alexander Lindeman (Canada) Josephine Wu	18–21, 15–21	(silver) Runner-up

BWF International Challenge tournament
BWF International Series tournament
BWF Future Series tournament
