= Josephine Wu =

Canadian badminton player (born 1995)

Josephine Wu 吴宛菱
Personal information
- Born: Josephine Wu Yuenling; 20 January 1995 (age 31) Edmonton, Alberta, Canada
- Height: 1.68 m (5 ft 6 in)

Sport
- Country: Canada
- Sport: Badminton

Women's & mixed doubles
- Highest ranking: 27 (WD with Catherine Choi, 31 October 2023); 28 (XD with Ty Alexander Lindeman, 2 April 2024)
- Current ranking: 85 (XD with Ty Alexander Lindeman, 15 April 2025)
- BWF profile
Medal record
Women's badminton
Representing Canada
Pan American Games
Gold medal – first place	2019 Lima	Mixed doubles
Gold medal – first place	2023 Santiago	Women's doubles
Gold medal – first place	2023 Santiago	Mixed doubles
Pan Am Championships
Gold medal – first place	2016 Campinas	Women's doubles
Gold medal – first place	2017 Havana	Women's doubles
Gold medal – first place	2018 Guatemala City	Mixed doubles
Gold medal – first place	2019 Aguascalientes	Mixed doubles
Gold medal – first place	2021 Guatemala City	Mixed doubles
Gold medal – first place	2022 San Salvador	Mixed doubles
Gold medal – first place	2023 Kingston	Women's doubles
Gold medal – first place	2025 Lima	Mixed doubles
Silver medal – second place	2016 Campinas	Mixed doubles
Silver medal – second place	2018 Guatemala City	Women's doubles
Silver medal – second place	2019 Aguascalientes	Women's doubles
Silver medal – second place	2022 San Salvador	Women's doubles
Silver medal – second place	2023 Kingston	Mixed doubles
Bronze medal – third place	2024 Guatemala City	Women's doubles
Bronze medal – third place	2024 Guatemala City	Mixed doubles
Pan Am Mixed Team Championships
Gold medal – first place	2016 Campinas	Mixed team
Gold medal – first place	2017 Santo Domingo	Mixed team
Gold medal – first place	2019 Lima	Mixed team
Gold medal – first place	2023 Guadalajara	Mixed team
Gold medal – first place	2025 Aguascalientes	Mixed team
Pan Am Female Cup
Gold medal – first place	2018 Tacarigua	Women's team
Gold medal – first place	2024 São Paulo	Women's team
Gold medal – first place	2026 Guatemala City	Women's team
Silver medal – second place	2022 Acapulco	Women's team
Pan Am Junior Championships
Gold medal – first place	2013 Puerto Vallarta	Mixed doubles
Gold medal – first place	2013 Puerto Vallarta	Mixed team
Silver medal – second place	2012 Edmonton	Mixed team
Silver medal – second place	2013 Puerto Vallarta	Girls' doubles
Bronze medal – third place	2012 Edmonton	Girls' singles
Bronze medal – third place	2012 Edmonton	Girls' doubles
Bronze medal – third place	2012 Edmonton	Mixed doubles
Bronze medal – third place	2013 Puerto Vallarta	Girls' singles

Josephine Yuenling Wu (born 20 January 1995) is a Canadian badminton player. She clinched three Pan American Games gold medals by winning the mixed doubles title in 2019 and 2023, and in the women's doubles title in 2023. At the Pan Am Championships, she has won eight gold and five silver medals since her debut at the tournament in 2016.

== Early and personal life ==
Wu was a business student at the University of Alberta and has been competing in badminton since she was seven years old.

== Career ==
As a junior, she won 29 provincial titles and was a member of Team Canada at the 2012 BWF World Junior Championships and the Pan Am Junior Badminton Championships from 2008 to 2013. Despite having a full course load in university, Josephine's passion for the sport has motivated her to continue balancing her school work and training. She was the mixed doubles winner at the 2014 College-University National Championships and went on to represent Canada at the 2014 World University Badminton Championships in Cordoba, Spain. Outside of training, Josephine also enjoys coaching her high school's badminton team. In 2016, she won the gold medal in the mixed team event at the Pan Am Badminton Championships. In the individual event, she won the Pan Am Championships gold medals in the women's doubles in 2016, and 2017, and also in the mixed doubles in 2018, 2019 and 2021. Wu was a gold medalist in the mixed doubles event at the 2019 Lima Pan American Games.

In 2021, Wu defend her mixed doubles title at the Pan Am Championships with partner Joshua Hurlburt-Yu, when the duo beating Christopher Martínez and Marian Paiz of Guatemala in the final in straight games. In June, Wu was named to Canada's Olympic team, competing in the mixed doubles badminton event with Hurlburt-Yu, but they were eliminated in the group stage. After the Olympics, Wu reunited with Ty Alexander Lindeman and managed to win the Guatemala International, became their first in the international tournament since their last pairing in 2018.

In 2023, Wu took the gold medal in the women's doubles with Catherine Choi and the silver medal with Ty Alexander Lindeman at the Pan Am Championships. This was the seven gold medals won by Wu since her debut at the Championships in 2016. She then made her second appearance at the Pan American Games and captured two gold medals by winning the women's doubles with Choi and the mixed doubles with Lindeman. She also won double title in the Guatemala International, and the mixed doubles title in the Peru Challenge.

In 2024, Wu joined the Canada winning team at the Pan Am Female Cup. She won the mixed doubles title at the Polish Open partnered with Lindeman. As the first seeded at the Pan Am Championships both in the mixed and women's doubles, she had to settle for the bronze medals in both events after being defeated by the American pairs.

In 2025, Wu participated in the Pan American Cup and won the gold medal with the Canada team. She then captured her eight Pan Am Championships individual title, by winning the mixed doubles with Lindeman.

== Achievements ==
=== Pan American Games ===
Women's doubles
Year	Venue	Partner	Opponent	Score	Result
2023	Olympic Training Center; Santiago, Chile	(Canada) Catherine Choi	(United States) Annie Xu (United States) Kerry Xu	21–18, 10–21, 21–17	Gold

Mixed doubles
Year	Venue	Partner	Opponent	Score	Result
2019	Polideportivo 3 Lima, Peru	(Canada) Joshua Hurlburt-Yu	(Canada) Nyl Yakura (Canada) Kristen Tsai	18–21, 21–12, 21–15	Gold
2023	Olympic Training Center; Santiago, Chile	(Canada) Ty Alexander Lindeman	(United States) Vinson Chiu (United States) Jennie Gai	17–21, 21–17, 21–19	Gold

=== Pan Am Championships ===
Women's doubles
Year	Venue	Partner	Opponent	Score	Result
2016	Clube Fonte São Paulo; Campinas, Brazil	(Canada) Michelle Tong	(Peru) Paula la Torre (Peru) Luz María Zornoza	21–17, 21–17	Gold
2017	Sports City Coliseum; Havana, Cuba	(Canada) Michelle Tong	(Peru) Daniela Macías (Peru) Dánica Nishimura	21–11, 21–12	Gold
2018	Teodoro Palacios Flores Gymnasium; Guatemala City, Guatemala	(Canada) Michelle Tong	(Canada) Rachel Honderich (Canada) Kristen Tsai	21–17, 17–21, 14–21	Silver
2019	Gimnasio Olímpico; Aguascalientes, Mexico	(Canada) Catherine Choi	(Canada) Rachel Honderich (Canada) Kristen Tsai	15–21, 25–27	Silver
2022	Palacio de los Deportes Carlos "El Famoso" Hernández; San Salvador, El Salvador	(Canada) Catherine Choi	(Canada) Rachel Honderich (Canada) Kristen Tsai	17–21, 18–21	Silver
2023	G.C. Foster College of Physical Education and Sport; Kingston, Jamaica	(Canada) Catherine Choi	(United States) Francesca Corbett (United States) Allison Lee	21–14, 21–18	Gold
2024	Teodoro Palacios Flores Gymnasium; Guatemala City, Guatemala	(Canada) Catherine Choi	(United States) Francesca Corbett (United States) Allison Lee	18–21, 15–21	Bronze

Mixed doubles
Year	Venue	Partner	Opponent	Score	Result
2016	Clube Fonte São Paulo; Campinas, Brazil	(Canada) Nathan Osborne	(Canada) Nyl Yakura (Canada) Brittney Tam	17–21, 17–21	Silver
2018	Teodoro Palacios Flores Gymnasium; Guatemala City, Guatemala	(Canada) Ty Alexander Lindeman	(Canada) Nyl Yakura (Canada) Kristen Tsai	21–14, 26–24	Gold
2019	Gimnasio Olímpico; Aguascalientes, Mexico	(Canada) Joshua Hurlburt-Yu	(Brazil) Fabricio Farias (Brazil) Jaqueline Lima	21–14, 21–19	Gold
2021	Sagrado Corazon de Jesus; Guatemala City, Guatemala	(Canada) Joshua Hurlburt-Yu	(Guatemala) Christopher Martínez (Guatemala) Mariana Paiz	21–18, 21–18	Gold
2022	Palacio de los Deportes Carlos "El Famoso" Hernández; San Salvador, El Salvador	(Canada) Ty Alexander Lindeman	(Guatemala) Jonathan Solís (Guatemala) Diana Corleto	21–12, 21–11	Gold
2023	G.C. Foster College of Physical Education and Sport; Kingston, Jamaica	(Canada) Ty Alexander Lindeman	(Canada) Joshua Hurlburt-Yu (Canada) Rachel Honderich	20–22, 21–18, 17–21	Silver
2024	Teodoro Palacios Flores Gymnasium; Guatemala City, Guatemala	(Canada) Ty Alexander Lindeman	(United States) Presley Smith (United States) Allison Lee	11–21, 16–21	Bronze
2025	Videna Poli 2 Lima, Peru	(Canada) Ty Alexander Lindeman	(Canada) Jonathan Lai (Canada) Crystal Lai	21–15, 21–15	Gold

=== Pan Am Junior Championships ===
Girls' singles
Year	Venue	Opponent	Score	Result
2012	Millennium Place; Edmonton, Canada	(United States) Cherie Chow	13–21, 20–22	Bronze
2013	Puerto Vallarta, Mexico	(Brazil) Lohaynny Vicente	13–21, 19–21	Bronze

Girls' doubles
Year	Venue	Partner	Opponent	Score	Result
2012	Millennium Place; Edmonton, Canada	(Canada) Takeisha Wang	(United States) Cherie Chow (United States) Christine Yang	21–18, 18–21, 21–23	Bronze
2013	Puerto Vallarta, Mexico	(Canada) Takeisha Wang	(United States) Cherie Chow (United States) Christine Yang	17–21, 15–21	Silver

Mixed doubles
Year	Venue	Partner	Opponent	Score	Result
2012	Millennium Place; Edmonton, Canada	(Canada) Nathan Osborne	(United States) Phillip Chew (United States) Iris Wang	19–21, 16–21	Bronze
2013	Puerto Vallarta, Mexico	(Canada) Nathan Osborne	(United States) Kevin Chan (United States) Christine Yang	21–16, 15–21, 21–18	Gold

=== BWF International Challenge/Series (15 titles, 5 runners-up) ===
Women's doubles
Year	Venue	Partner	Opponent	Score	Result
2018	Guatemala International	(Canada) Talia Ng	(Canada) Eliana Zhang (Canada) Wendy Zhang	14–21, 21–17, 21–10	(gold) Winner
2019	Bulgarian Open	(Canada) Catherine Choi	(Turkey) Bengisu Erçetin (Turkey) Nazlıcan İnci	8–21, 8–21	(silver) Runner-up
2022	Mexican International	(Canada) Catherine Choi	(United States) Paula Lynn Cao Hok (United States) Lauren Lam	21–19, 21–10	(gold) Winner
2023	Polish Open	(Canada) Catherine Choi	(Singapore) Jin Yujia (Singapore) Crystal Wong	17–21, 21–17, 15–21	(silver) Runner-up
2023	Guatemala International	(Canada) Catherine Choi	(United States) Annie Xu (United States) Kerry Xu	21–18, 21–18	(gold) Winner
2024	Azerbaijan International	(Canada) Catherine Choi	(Bulgaria) Gabriela Stoeva (Bulgaria) Stefani Stoeva	14–21, 7–21	(silver) Runner-up
2026	Vietnam International	(Australia) Gronya Somerville	(Japan) Miki Kanehiro (Japan) Yuna Kato	16–21, 21–19, 24–22	(gold) Winner

Mixed doubles
Year	Venue	Partner	Opponent	Score	Result
2017	Yonex / K&D Graphics International	(Canada) Toby Ng	(United States) Sattawat Pongnairat (United States) Kuei-Ya Chen	21–19, 21–15	(gold) Winner
2018	Yonex / K&D Graphics International	(Canada) Joshua Hurlburt-Yu	(United States) Sattawat Pongnairat (United States) Kerry Xu	21–16, 21–13	(gold) Winner
2018	Guatemala International	(Canada) Joshua Hurlburt-Yu	(Cuba) Leodannis Martínez (Cuba) Tahimara Oropeza	21–12, 21–18	(gold) Winner
2018	Santo Domingo Open	(Canada) Joshua Hurlburt-Yu	(Brazil) Fabricio Farias (Brazil) Jaqueline Lima	21–17, 16–21, 22–20	(gold) Winner
2019	Bulgarian Open	(Canada) Joshua Hurlburt-Yu	(England) Matthew Clare (England) Lizzie Tolman	21–16, 21–16	(gold) Winner
2019	South Australia International	(Canada) Joshua Hurlburt-Yu	(Indonesia) Dejan Ferdinansyah (Indonesia) Serena Kani	21–19, 25–27, 21–16	(gold) Winner
2019	Yonex / K&D Graphics International	(Canada) Joshua Hurlburt-Yu	(Chinese Taipei) Lu Chia-pin (Chinese Taipei) Lin Wan-ching	21–18, 21–18	(gold) Winner
2021	Guatemala International	(Canada) Ty Alexander Lindeman	(United States) Joshua Yuan (United States) Allison Lee	21–17, 21–8	(gold) Winner
2022	Peru Challenge	(Canada) Ty Alexander Lindeman	(United States) Vinson Chiu (United States) Jennie Gai	20–22, 21–13, 21–23	(silver) Runner-up
2023	Mexican International	(Canada) Ty Alexander Lindeman	(United States) Vinson Chiu (United States) Jennie Gai	20–22, 16–21	(silver) Runner-up
2023	Guatemala International	(Canada) Ty Alexander Lindeman	(Canada) Kevin Lee (Canada) Eliana Zhang	21–9, 21–11	(gold) Winner
2023	Peru Challenge	(Canada) Ty Alexander Lindeman	(United States) Vinson Chiu (United States) Jennie Gai	21–18, 21–15	(gold) Winner
2024	Polish Open	(Canada) Ty Alexander Lindeman	(England) Callum Hemming (England) Estelle van Leeuwen	21–16, 22–20	(gold) Winner

BWF International Challenge tournament
BWF International Series tournament
BWF Future Series tournament
