= Ty Alexander Lindeman =

Canadian badminton player (born 1997)

Personal information
- Born: 15 August 1997 (age 29) St. Albert, Alberta, Canada
- Height: 1.83 m (6 ft 0 in)
- Weight: 88 kg (194 lb)

Sport
- Country: Canada
- Sport: Badminton
- Handedness: Right

Men's & mixed doubles
- Highest ranking: 36 (MD with Kevin Lee, 13 October 2026); 28 (XD with Josephine Wu, 2 April 2024)
- Current ranking: 39 (MD with Kevin Lee, 10 November 2026)
- BWF profile
Medal record
Men's badminton
Representing Canada
Pan American Games
| Gold medal – first place | 2023 Santiago | Mixed doubles |
Pan Am Championships
| Gold medal – first place | 2018 Guatemala City | Mixed doubles |
| Gold medal – first place | 2022 San Salvador | Mixed doubles |
| Gold medal – first place | 2025 Lima | Mixed doubles |
| Silver medal – second place | 2017 Havana | Men's doubles |
| Silver medal – second place | 2023 Kingston | Men's doubles |
| Silver medal – second place | 2023 Kingston | Mixed doubles |
| Silver medal – second place | 2026 Lima | Men's doubles |
| Bronze medal – third place | 2022 San Salvador | Men's doubles |
| Bronze medal – third place | 2024 Guatemala City | Mixed doubles |
| Bronze medal – third place | 2025 Lima | Men's doubles |
Pan Am Male Cup
| Gold medal – first place | 2018 Tacarigua | Men's team |
| Gold medal – first place | 2022 Acapulco | Men's team |
| Gold medal – first place | 2024 Sao Paulo | Men's team |
| Gold medal – first place | 2026 Guatemala City | Men's team |
Pan Am Mixed Team Championships
| Gold medal – first place | 2023 Guadalajara | Mixed team |
| Gold medal – first place | 2025 Aguascalientes | Mixed team |
Pan Am Junior Championships
| Silver medal – second place | 2015 Tijuana | Boys' doubles |
| Silver medal – second place | 2015 Tijuana | Mixed doubles |
| Bronze medal – third place | 2015 Tijuana | Mixed team |
| Bronze medal – third place | 2015 Tijuana | Boys' singles |

Ty Alexander Lindeman (born 15 August 1997) is a Canadian badminton player. He won the gold medals in the mixed doubles at the 2023 Pan American Games; also at the 2018, 2022 and 2025 Pan Am Championships.

== Career ==
Lindeman trains at Drive Sports Badminton Club, and in 2015, he represented Alberta competed at the XXV Canada Games. He was selected to join Canada junior team at the Pan Am Junior Championships in Tijuana, where he collected two silver and two bronze medals.

Lindeman won two U23 national titles in 2016 for men's doubles (with Austin Bauer) and mixed doubles (with Takeisha Wang).

In 2017, Lindeman won the silver medal at the Pan Am Championships in the men's doubles event with his partner, Austin Bauer.

In 2018, Lindeman competed at the Commonwealth Games in Gold Coast, Australia. He then took the gold medal in the mixed doubles with Josephine Wu at the 2018 Pan Am Championships.

In mid 2021, Lindeman reunited with Josephine Wu and managed to win the Guatemala International, became their first title in the international tournament since their last pairing in 2018. He also won the men's doubles title partnered with Kevin Lee.

In 2022, Lindeman and Wu managed to win the mixed doubles title at the Pan Am Championships.

In 2023, Lindeman claimed two silver medals at the Pan Am Championships in the mixed doubles with Wu and in the men's doubles with Lee. In October, he made his debut at the Pan American Games, and won the mixed doubles gold medal with Wu. He also won the men's doubles title at the Guatemala, Peru, and, El Salvador International Challenge; and also the mixed doubles title in the Guatemala and Peru.

In 2024, Lindeman joined the Canada team competing in the Pan Am Male Cup, where the team emerge champions at that competition. He won the mixed doubles title at the Polish Open partnered with Josephine Wu. As the first seeded at the Pan Am Championships, the duo had to settle for the bronze medal after being defeated by the American pair Presley Smith and Allison Lee.

In 2025, Lindeman participated in the Pan American Cup and won the gold medal with the Canada team. At the Pan Am Championships, he clinched his third gold medal in the mixed doubles with Josephine Wu, and also the bronze medal in the men's doubles with Kevin Lee, after losing the semi-finals to Fabrício Farias and Davi Silva.

== Achievements ==
=== Pan American Games ===
Mixed doubles
| Year | Venue | Partner | Opponent | Score | Result |
|---|---|---|---|---|---|
| 2023 | Olympic Training Center; Santiago, Chile | (Canada) Josephine Wu | (United States) Vinson Chiu (United States) Jennie Gai | 17–21, 21–17, 21–19 | Gold |

=== Pan Am Championships ===
Men's doubles
| Year | Venue | Partner | Opponent | Score | Result |
|---|---|---|---|---|---|
| 2017 | Sports City Coliseum; Havana, Cuba | (Canada) Austin Bauer | (Canada) Jason Ho-Shue (Canada) Nyl Yakura | 18–21, 6–21 | Silver |
| 2022 | Palacio de los Deportes Carlos "El Famoso" Hernández; San Salvador, El Salvador | (Canada) Kevin Lee | (United States) Vinson Chiu (United States) Joshua Yuan | 14–21, 16–21 | Bronze |
| 2023 | G.C. Foster College of Physical Education and Sport; Kingston, Jamaica | (Canada) Kevin Lee | (Canada) Adam Dong (Canada) Nyl Yakura | 10–21, 21–16, 20–22 | Silver |
| 2025 | Videna Poli 2 Lima, Peru | (Canada) Kevin Lee | (Brazil) Fabrício Farias (Brazil) Davi Silva | 21–19, 17–21, 11–21 | Bronze |
| 2026 | High Performance Center VIDENA; Lima, Peru | (Canada) Kevin Lee | (United States) Chen Zhi-yi (United States) Presley Smith | 21–13, 21–8 | Silver |

Mixed doubles
| Year | Venue | Partner | Opponent | Score | Result |
|---|---|---|---|---|---|
| 2018 | Teodoro Palacios Flores Gymnasium; Guatemala City, Guatemala | (Canada) Josephine Wu | (Canada) Nyl Yakura (Canada) Kristen Tsai | 21–14, 26–24 | Gold |
| 2022 | Palacio de los Deportes Carlos "El Famoso" Hernández; San Salvador, El Salvador | (Canada) Josephine Wu | (Guatemala) Jonathan Solís (Guatemala) Diana Corleto | 21–12, 21–11 | Gold |
| 2023 | G.C. Foster College of Physical Education and Sport; Kingston, Jamaica | (Canada) Josephine Wu | (Canada) Joshua Hurlburt-Yu (Canada) Rachel Honderich | 20–22, 21–18, 17–21 | Silver |
| 2024 | Teodoro Palacios Flores Gymnasium; Guatemala City, Guatemala | (Canada) Josephine Wu | (United States) Presley Smith (United States) Allison Lee | 11–21, 16–21 | Bronze |
| 2025 | Videna Poli 2 Lima, Peru | (Canada) Josephine Wu | (Canada) Jonathan Lai (Canada) Crystal Lai | 21–15, 21–15 | Gold |

=== Pan Am Junior Championships ===
Boys' singles
| Year | Venue | Opponent | Score | Result |
|---|---|---|---|---|
| 2015 | Centro de Alto Rendimiento; Tijuana, Mexico | (Brazil) Artur Silva Pomoceno | 18–21, 13–21 | Bronze |

Boys' doubles
| Year | Venue | Partner | Opponent | Score | Result |
|---|---|---|---|---|---|
| 2015 | Centro de Alto Rendimiento; Tijuana, Mexico | (Canada) Austin Bauer | (Canada) Jason Ho-Shue (Canada) Jonathan Lai | 15–21, 16–21 | Silver |

Mixed doubles
| Year | Venue | Partner | Opponent | Score | Result |
|---|---|---|---|---|---|
| 2015 | Centro de Alto Rendimiento; Tijuana, Mexico | (Canada) Takeisha Wang | (Canada) Jason Ho-Shue (Canada) Qingzi Ouyang | 10–21, 15–21 | Silver |

=== BWF International Challenge/Series (11 titles, 7 runners-up) ===
Men's doubles
| Year | Tournament | Partner | Opponent | Score | Result |
|---|---|---|---|---|---|
| 2021 | Guatemala International | (Canada) Kevin Lee | (Guatemala) Jonathan Solís (Guatemala) Aníbal Marroquín | 19–21, 21–17, 21–10 | (gold) Winner |
| 2022 | El Salvador International | (Canada) Kevin Lee | (Czech Republic) Ondřej Král (Czech Republic) Adam Mendrek | 21–19, 17–21, 21–18 | (gold) Winner |
| 2023 | Guatemala International | (Canada) Kevin Lee | (Brazil) Fabrício Farias (Brazil) Davi Silva | 21–18, 21–14 | (gold) Winner |
| 2023 | Peru Challenge | (Canada) Kevin Lee | (Canada) Adam Dong (Canada) Nyl Yakura | 21–16, 21–18 | (gold) Winner |
| 2023 | El Salvador International | (Canada) Kevin Lee | (United States) Vinson Chiu (United States) Joshua Yuan | 21–15, 21–18 | (gold) Winner |
| 2024 | Canadian International | (Canada) Kevin Lee | (United States) Chen Zhi-yi (United States) Presley Smith | 11–21, 9–21 | (silver) Runner-up |
| 2025 | Guatemala International | (Canada) Kevin Lee | (Brazil) Fabrício Farias (Brazil) Davi Silva | 21–11, 20–22, 17–21 | (silver) Runner-up |
| 2025 | Canadian International | (Canada) Kevin Lee | (United States) Chen Zhi-yi (United States) Presley Smith | 21–17, 15–21, 13–21 | (silver) Runner-up |
| 2026 | Brazil International | (Canada) Kevin Lee | (Japan) Takuto Goto (Japan) Yuta Oku | 17–21, 17–21 | (silver) Runner-up |
| 2026 | Guatemala International | (Canada) Kevin Lee | (Brazil) Fabrício Farias (Brazil) Davi Silva | 21–12, 21–17 | (gold) Winner |
| 2026 | Arise International | (Canada) Kevin Lee | (Brazil) Fabrício Farias (Brazil) Davi Silva | 15–21, 21–11, 22–20 | (gold) Winner |
| 2026 | Peru International | (Canada) Kevin Lee | (Brazil) Fabrício Farias (Brazil) Davi Silva | 18–21, 21–18, 15–21 | (silver) Runner-up |

Mixed doubles
| Year | Tournament | Partner | Opponent | Score | Result |
|---|---|---|---|---|---|
| 2021 | Guatemala International | (Canada) Josephine Wu | (United States) Joshua Yuan (United States) Allison Lee | 21–17, 21–8 | (gold) Winner |
| 2022 | Peru Challenge | (Canada) Josephine Wu | (United States) Vinson Chiu (United States) Jennie Gai | 20–22, 21–13, 21–23 | (silver) Runner-up |
| 2023 | Mexican International | (Canada) Josephine Wu | (United States) Vinson Chiu (United States) Jennie Gai | 20–22, 16–21 | (silver) Runner-up |
| 2023 | Guatemala International | (Canada) Josephine Wu | (Canada) Kevin Lee (Canada) Eliana Zhang | 21–9, 21–11 | (gold) Winner |
| 2023 | Peru Challenge | (Canada) Josephine Wu | (United States) Vinson Chiu (United States) Jennie Gai | 21–18, 21–15 | (gold) Winner |
| 2024 | Polish Open | (Canada) Josephine Wu | (England) Callum Hemming (England) Estelle van Leeuwen | 21–16, 22–20 | (gold) Winner |

BWF International Challenge tournament
BWF International Series tournament
