= Jennie Gai =

American badminton player (born 2001)

Jennie Gai 蓋駱
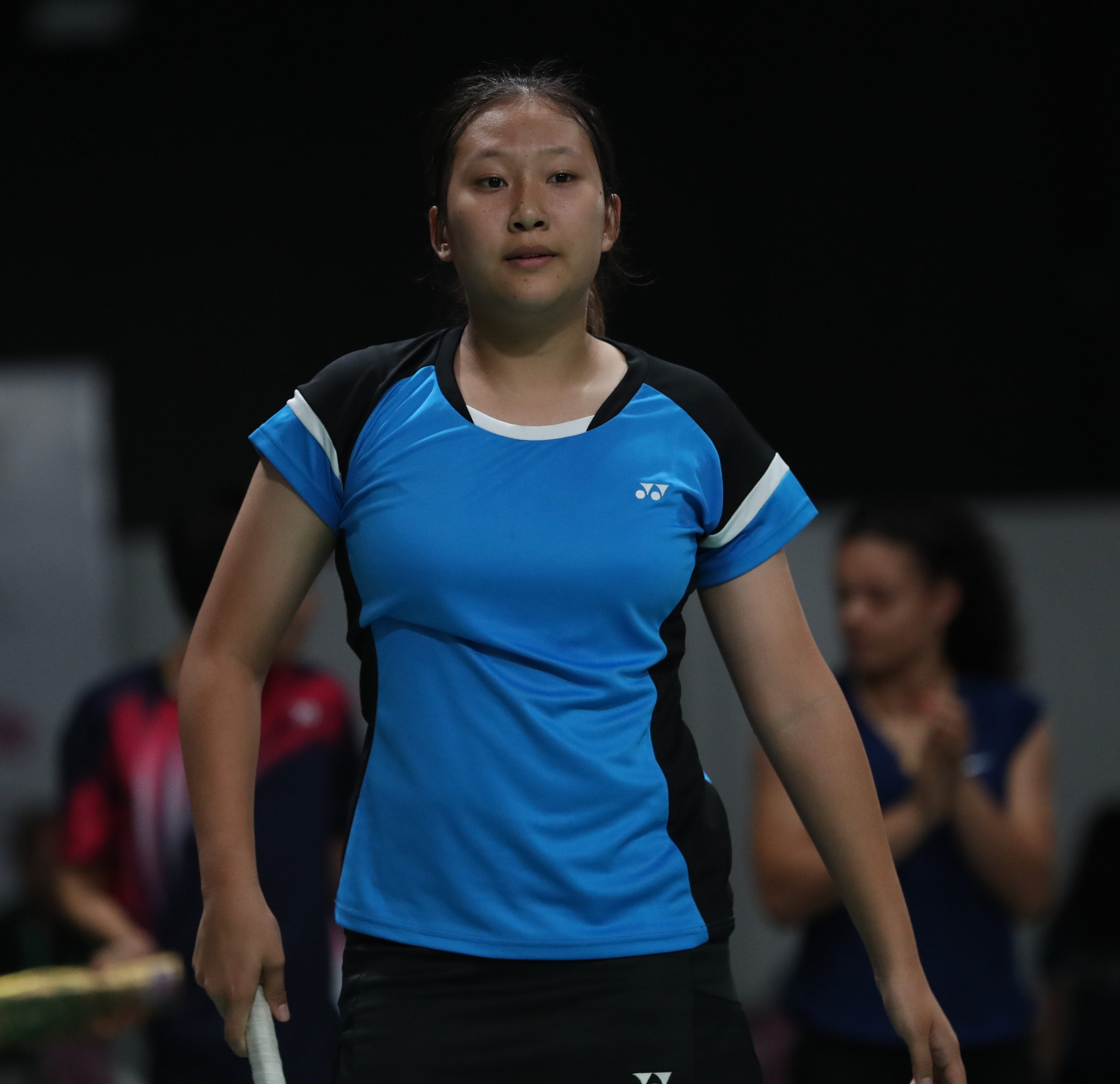
- Gai at the 2018 Summer Youth Olympics

Personal information
- Born: February 25, 2001 (age 25) Lowell, Massachusetts, United States
- Height: 1.75 m (5 ft 9 in)
- Weight: 73 kg (161 lb)

Sport
- Country: United States
- Sport: Badminton
- Handedness: Right
- Coached by: Naoko Fukuman; Tony Gunawan

Women's & mixed doubles
- Highest ranking: 66 (WS, January 24, 2023); 24 (WD with Francesca Corbett, April 14, 2026); 14 (XD with Presley Smith, October 27, 2026); 29 (XD with Vinson Chiu, July 18, 2023)
- Current ranking: 25 (WD with Francesca Corbett); 20 (XD with Presley Smith) (November 17, 2026)
- BWF profile
Medal record
Women's badminton
Representing the United States
Pan American Games
Silver medal – second place	2023 Santiago	Women's singles
Silver medal – second place	2023 Santiago	Mixed doubles
Pan American Championships
Gold medal – first place	2026 Lima	Mixed doubles
Silver medal – second place	2024 Guatemala City	Mixed doubles
Silver medal – second place	2026 Lima	Women's doubles
Bronze medal – third place	2018 Guatemala City	Women's doubles
Bronze medal – third place	2019 Aguascalientes	Women's singles
Bronze medal – third place	2025 Lima	Mixed doubles
Pan Am Mixed Team Championships
Silver medal – second place	2019 Lima	Mixed team
Silver medal – second place	2023 Guadalajara	Mixed team
Silver medal – second place	2025 Aguascalientes	Mixed team
Bronze medal – third place	2017 Santo Domingo	Mixed team
Pan Am Female Cup
Gold medal – first place	2022 Acapulco	Women's team
Silver medal – second place	2026 Guatemala City	Women's team
Pan Am Junior Championships
Gold medal – first place	2017 Markham	Mixed team
Silver medal – second place	2016 Lima	Girls' singles
Silver medal – second place	2017 Markham	Girls' singles
Bronze medal – third place	2016 Lima	Mixed team
Representing (International Olympic Committee) Mixed-NOCs
Youth Olympic Games
Gold medal – first place	2018 Buenos Aires	Mixed team

Jennie Gai (/ɡaɪ/; born February 25, 2001) is an American badminton player who competes in international level events. She was a gold medalist at the 2018 Summer Youth Olympics, and silver medalists in the 2023 Pan American Games.

== Personal life ==
Gai graduated with a bachelor's degree in Nutritional Science from the University of California, Berkeley in 2022.

== Career ==
In the junior event, Gai won six titles in the Pan Am Junior Badminton Championships (U11 girls' doubles in 2011; U13 girls' singles, doubles and mixed doubles in 2013; and also U15 girls' singles, and mixed doubles in 2015). She represented her country at the 2016 BWF World Junior Championships. She won her first senior international title in the 2017 Internacional Mexicano.

In 2018, Gai became the first and only American badminton player since 2010 to qualify for the Youth Olympic Games. She finished the tournament as a quarter-finalist in the girls' singles and won the gold medal in the team event together with Team Alpha.

In 2022, she helped the American women's team win the Pan Am Female Cup, and qualified for the Uber Cup.

In 2023, Gai made her debut at the Pan American Games, clinching two silver medals in the mixed doubles and women's singles.

In 2024, Gai represented her country competing in the Summer Olympics in the mixed doubles with Vinson Chiu.

== Achievements ==
=== Pan American Games ===
Women's singles
Year	Venue	Opponent	Score	Result
2023	Olympic Training Center, Santiago, Chile	(United States) Beiwen Zhang	8–21, 12–21	Silver

Mixed doubles
Year	Venue	Partner	Opponent	Score	Result
2023	Olympic Training Center; Santiago, Chile	(United States) Vinson Chiu	(Canada) Ty Alexander Lindeman (Canada) Josephine Wu	21–17, 17–21, 19–21	Silver

=== Pan Am Championships ===
Women's singles
Year	Venue	Opponent	Score	Result
2019	Gimnasio Olímpico, Aguascalientes, Mexico	(Canada) Brittney Tam	8–21, 21–14, 18–21	Bronze

Women's doubles
Year	Venue	Partner	Opponent	Score	Result
2018	Teodoro Palacios Flores Gymnasium, Guatemala City, Guatemala	(United States) Jamie Hsu	(Canada) Michelle Tong (Canada) Josephine Wu	17–21, 15–21	Bronze
2026	High Performance Center VIDENA, Lima, Peru	(United States) Francesca Corbett	(United States) Lauren Lam (United States) Allison Lee	18–21, 18–21	Silver

Mixed doubles
Year	Venue	Partner	Opponent	Score	Result
2024	Teodoro Palacios Flores Gymnasium, Guatemala City, Guatemala	(United States) Vinson Chiu	(United States) Presley Smith (United States) Allison Lee	21–15, 15–21, 14–21	Silver
2025	Videna Poli 2, Lima, Peru	(United States) Presley Smith	(Canada) Ty Alexander Lindeman (Canada) Josephine Wu	22–20, 17–21, 18–21	Bronze
2026	High Performance Center VIDENA, Lima, Peru	(United States) Presley Smith	(Brazil) Davi Silva (Brazil) Sânia Lima	21–16, 21–15	Gold

=== Pan Am Junior Championships ===
Girls' singles
Year	Venue	Opponent	Score	Result
2016	CAR la Videna, Lima, Peru	(Canada) Qingzi Ouyang	6–21, 9–21	Silver
2017	Markham Pan Am Centre, Markham, Canada	(United States) Lauren Lam	12–21, 21–19, 20–22	Silver

=== BWF World Tour (1 runner-up) ===
The BWF World Tour, which was announced on 19 March 2017 and implemented in 2018, is a series of elite badminton tournaments sanctioned by the Badminton World Federation (BWF). The BWF World Tours are divided into levels of World Tour Finals, Super 1000, Super 750, Super 500, Super 300, and the BWF Tour Super 100.

Mixed doubles
Year	Tournament	Level	Partner	Opponent	Score	Result	Ref.
2025	Canada Open	Super 300	(United States) Presley Smith	(Thailand) Ruttanapak Oupthong (Thailand) Jhenicha Sudjaipraparat	14–21, 17–21	(silver) Runner-up	

=== BWF International Challenge/Series (9 titles, 7 runners-up) ===
Women's singles
Year	Tournament	Opponent	Score	Result
2017	Internacional Mexicano	(United States) Isabel Zhong	21–11, 18–21, 21–16	(gold) Winner
2018	Internacional Mexicano	(Cuba) Tahimara Oropeza	21–13, 18–21, 19–21	(silver) Runner-up
2021	Guatemala International	(India) Samayara Panwar	21–6, 21–9	(gold) Winner
2021	Internacional Mexicano	(United States) Lauren Lam	9–21, 15–21	(silver) Runner-up

Women's doubles
Year	Tournament	Partner	Opponent	Score	Result
2018	Brazil International	(United States) Jamie Hsu	(Canada) Rachel Honderich (United States) Jamie Subandhi	15–21, 10–21	(silver) Runner-up
2019	Jamaica International	(United States) Breanna Chi	(Peru) Inés Castillo (Peru) Dánica Nishimura	21–11, 21–6	(gold) Winner
2019	Silicon Valley International	(United States) Breanna Chi	(United States) Annie Xu (United States) Kerry Xu	14–21, 11–21	(silver) Runner-up
2019	Internacional Mexicano	(United States) Breanna Chi	(Mexico) Jessica Bautista (Mexico) Vanessa Villalobos	21–10, 21–10	(gold) Winner

Mixed doubles
Year	Tournament	Partner	Opponent	Score	Result
2021	Mexican International	(United States) Vinson Chiu	(Mexico) Luis Montoya (Mexico) Vanessa Villalobos	21–17, 21–18	(gold) Winner
2021	Internacional Mexicano	(United States) Vinson Chiu	(Canada) Nicolas Nguyen (Canada) Alexandra Mocanu	21–13, 21–11	(gold) Winner
2022	Mexican International	(United States) Vinson Chiu	(Japan) Naoki Yamada (Japan) Moe Ikeuchi	15–21, 21–18, 10–21	(silver) Runner-up
2022	Peru Challenge	(United States) Vinson Chiu	(Canada) Ty Alexander Lindeman (Canada) Josephine Wu	22–20, 13–21, 23–21	(gold) Winner
2022	Mexican International	(United States) Vinson Chiu	(United States) Joshua Yuan (United States) Allison Lee	21–14, 22–24, 23–21	(gold) Winner
2023	Mexican International	(United States) Vinson Chiu	(Canada) Ty Alexander Lindeman (Canada) Josephine Wu	22–20, 21–16	(gold) Winner
2023	Maldives International	(United States) Vinson Chiu	(Malaysia) Hoo Pang Ron (Malaysia) Teoh Mei Xing	13–21, 18–21	(silver) Runner-up
2023	Peru Challenge	(United States) Vinson Chiu	(Canada) Ty Alexander Lindeman (Canada) Josephine Wu	18–21, 15–21	(silver) Runner-up

BWF International Challenge tournament
BWF International Series tournament
BWF Future Series tournament

=== BWF Junior International (1 title) ===
Girls' singles
Year	Tournament	Opponent	Score	Result
2018	Mexican Junior International (Note: This tournament points equivalent to Continental Junior Championships.)	(Peru) Fernanda Saponara	22–20, 21–6	(gold) Winner

BWF Junior International Grand Prix tournament
BWF Junior International Challenge tournament
BWF Junior International Series tournament
BWF Junior Future Series tournament
