= Costa Rica national badminton team =

National badminton team representing Costa Rica

Costa Rica
- Association: Federación de Bádminton Costa Rica (FBCR)
- Confederation: BPA (Pan America)
- President: Adrian Gomez Calvo

BWF ranking
- Current ranking: 113 ▲4 (2 January 2024)
- Highest ranking: 79 (3 January 2023)

The Costa Rica national badminton team (Spanish: Selección nacional de bádminton de Costa Rica) represents Costa Rica in international badminton team competitions. The Costa Rican junior team have competed in the BWF World Junior Championships mixed team event, which is also called the Suhandinata Cup.

== History ==
Badminton in Costa Rica was first played in the 1970s. The sport later lost its recognition in the late 1980s. Soon after, badminton enthusiasts in Costa Rica attempted to revive badminton in the country by establishing the Association for the Development of Badminton (Spanish: Asociación para el Desarrollo del Bádminton).

=== Mixed team ===
The Costa Rican mixed team competed in the 2018 Central American and Caribbean Games mixed team event. They were placed in Group B with Cuba, Barbados and Mexico. The team lost to 5–0 to Cuba and Mexico. The team then almost beat Barbados but were eliminated in the group stages.

== Competitive record ==
=== Thomas Cup ===
Year	Round	Pos
1949	Did not enter	
1952	Did not enter	
1955	Did not enter	
1958	Did not enter	
1961	Did not enter	
1964	Did not enter	
1967	Did not enter	
1970	Did not enter	
1973	Did not enter	
1976	Did not enter	
1979	Did not enter	
1982	Did not enter	
1984	Did not enter	
1986	Did not enter	
1988	Did not enter	
1990	Did not enter	
1992	Did not enter	
1994	Did not enter	
1996	Did not enter	
1998	Did not enter	
2000	Did not enter	
2002	Did not enter	
2004	Did not enter	
2006	Did not enter	
2008	Did not enter	
2010	Did not enter	
2012	Did not enter	
2014	Did not enter	
2016	Did not enter	
2018	Did not enter	
2020	Did not enter	
2022	Did not enter	
2024	Did not enter	
2026	Did not qualify	
2028	TBD	
2030	TBD	

=== Uber Cup ===
Year	Round	Pos
1957	Did not enter	
1960	Did not enter	
1963	Did not enter	
1966	Did not enter	
1969	Did not enter	
1972	Did not enter	
1975	Did not enter	
1978	Did not enter	
1981	Did not enter	
1984	Did not enter	
1986	Did not enter	
1988	Did not enter	
1990	Did not enter	
1992	Did not enter	
1994	Did not enter	
1996	Did not enter	
1998	Did not enter	
2000	Did not enter	
2002	Did not enter	
2004	Did not enter	
2006	Did not enter	
2008	Did not enter	
2010	Did not enter	
2012	Did not enter	
2014	Did not enter	
2016	Did not enter	
2018	Did not enter	
2020	Did not enter	
2022	Did not enter	
2024	Did not enter	
2026	Did not enter	
2028	TBD	
2030	TBD	

=== Sudirman Cup ===
Year	Round	Pos
1989	Did not enter	
1991	Did not enter	
1993	Did not enter	
1995	Did not enter	
1997	Did not enter	
1999	Did not enter	
2001	Did not enter	
2003	Did not enter	
2005	Did not enter	
2007	Did not enter	
2009	Did not enter	
2011	Did not enter	
2013	Did not enter	
2015	Did not enter	
2017	Did not enter	
2019	Did not enter	
2021	Did not enter	
2023	Did not enter	
2025	Did not qualify	
2027	TBD	
2029	TBD	

=== Pan American Team Championships ===
==== Men's team ====
Year	Round	Pos
2004	Did not enter	
2006	Did not enter	
2008	Did not enter	
2010	Did not enter	
2012	Did not enter	
2016	Did not enter	
2018	Did not enter	
2020	Did not enter	
2022	Did not enter	
2024	Did not enter	
2026	Group stage	9th
2028	TBD	
2030	TBD	

==== Women's team ====
Year	Round	Pos
2004	Did not enter	
2006	Did not enter	
2008	Did not enter	
2010	Did not enter	
2012	Did not enter	
2016	Did not enter	
2018	Did not enter	
2020	Did not enter	
2022	Did not enter	
2024	Did not enter	
2026	Did not enter	
2028	TBD	
2030	TBD	

==== Mixed team ====
Year	Round	Pos
1977	Did not enter	
1978	Did not enter	
1979	Did not enter	
1980	Did not enter	
1987	Did not enter	
1989	Did not enter	
1991	Did not enter	
1993	Did not enter	
1997	Did not enter	
2001	Did not enter	
2004	Did not enter	
2005	Did not enter	
2007	Did not enter	
2008	Did not enter	
2009	Did not enter	
2010	Did not enter	
2012	Did not enter	
2013	Did not enter	
2014	Did not enter	
2016	Did not enter	
2017	Did not enter	
2019	Did not enter	
2023	Did not enter	
2025	Group stage	9th
2027	TBD	
2029	TBD	

=== Central American and Caribbean Games ===
==== Men's team ====
Year	Round	Pos
2010	Did not enter	

==== Women's team ====
Year	Round	Pos
2010	Did not enter	

==== Mixed team ====
Year	Round	Pos
1990	Did not enter	
2006	Did not enter	
2014	Did not enter	
2018	Group stage	
2023	Group stage	

**Red border color indicates tournament was held on home soil.

== Junior competitive record ==
=== Suhandinata Cup ===
Year	Round	Pos
2000	Did not enter	
2002	Did not enter	
2004	Did not enter	
2006	Did not enter	
2007	Did not enter	
2008	Did not enter	
2009	Did not enter	
2010	Did not enter	
2011	Did not enter	
2012	Did not enter	
2013	Did not enter	
2014	Did not enter	
2015	Group stage	36th
2016	Group stage	47th
2017	Did not enter	
2018	Did not enter	
2019	Did not enter	
2022	Did not enter	
2023	Did not enter	
2024	TBD	

=== Pan American Junior Team Championships ===
==== Mixed team ====
Year	Round	Pos
1977	Did not enter	
1980	Did not enter	
1981	Did not enter	
1988	Did not enter	
1990	Did not enter	
1991	Did not enter	
1992	Did not enter	
1994	Did not enter	
1996	Did not enter	
1998	Did not enter	
2000	Did not enter	
2002	Did not enter	
2004	Did not enter	
2006	Did not enter	
2007	Did not enter	
2008	Did not enter	
2009	Did not enter	
2010	Did not enter	
2011	Did not enter	
2012	Did not enter	
2013	Group stage	13th
2014	Group stage	12th
2015	Group stage	8th
2016	Group stage	12th
2017	Did not enter	
2018	Did not enter	
2019	Did not enter	
2021	Did not enter	
2022	Did not enter	
2023	Group stage	8th
2024	Did not enter	
2025	Group stage	12th

**Red border color indicates tournament was held on home soil.

== Players ==
=== Current squad ===
As of 2 January 2024

==== Men's team ====
Name	DoB/Age	Ranking of event		
Name	DoB/Age	MS	MD	XD
Gianpiero Cavallotti	9 September 1997 (age 28)	398	717	494
Takeru Fujisawa	11 May 2002 (age 23)	1339	717	–
Santiago Suárez	29 June 2006 (age 19)	–	–	–

==== Women's team ====
Name	DoB/Age	Ranking of event		
Name	DoB/Age	WS	WD	XD
Lauren Villalobos	20 August 2000 (aged 25)	–	–	–
Cristal Villarreal	19 May 2005 (age 20)	–	–	–
Arianna Rodríguez	10 July 2006 (age 19)	–	–	–

=== Previous squads ===
==== Central American and Caribbean Games ====
- Mixed team: 2018
