= 2025 Pan Am Badminton Championships =

Tournament details
- Dates: 13–16 February (mixed team event); 9–12 April (individual event)
- Edition: 28th
- Venue: Gimnasio Olímpico Aguascalientes (Team event); Videna Poli 2 (Individual event)
- Location: Aguascalientes, Mexico (Team event); Lima, Peru (Individual event)

Champions
- Men's singles: (Canada) Victor Lai
- Women's singles: (Brazil) Juliana Viana Vieira
- Men's doubles: (United States) Chen Zhi-yi (United States) Presley Smith
- Women's doubles: (United States) Lauren Lam (United States) Allison Lee
- Mixed doubles: (Canada) Ty Alexander Lindeman (Canada) Josephine Wu

The 2025 Pan Am Badminton Championships was a continental badminton championships in the Americas sanctioned by Badminton Pan America, and the Badminton World Federation. The mixed team and individual events were held from 13 to 16 February and 9 to 12 April respectively.

== Tournament ==
The 2025 Pan Am Badminton Championships Team Event, officially the 2025 Pan American Cup, was a continental badminton team championship tournament to crown the best mixed team in Pan America that would qualify for the 2025 Sudirman Cup. This event was organized by the Badminton Pan Am and the Federacion Mexicana de Badminton. Nine teams participated in the tournament.

The individual event of the Pan Am Badminton Championships was an individual continental badminton championship tournament to crown the best male and female players and pairs in Pan America. The ranking points of this tournament are equivalent to the BWF World Tour Super 300 event. This event was organized by the Badminton Pan Am and Badminton Peru.

=== Venue ===
- The team event was held at the Gimnasio Olímpico Aguascalientes in Aguascalientes, Mexico.
- The individual event was held at the Videna Poli 2 in Lima, Peru.

=== Points distribution ===
Below is the table with the points distribution for each phase of the tournament based on the BWF points system for the Pan American Badminton Championships, which is equivalent to a Super 300 event.

Winner	Runner-up	3/4	5/8	9/16	17/32	33/64
7,000	5,950	4,900	3,850	2,750	1,670	660

== Medalists ==
Event	Gold	Silver	Bronze
Mixed team	Canada; Jonathan Lai; Victor Lai; Kevin Lee; Ty Alexander Lindeman; Nyl Yakura; Brian Yang Jacqueline Cheung; Catherine Choi; Jackie Dent; Crystal Lai; Michelle Li; Josephine Wu; Eliana Zhang; Wen Yu Zhang	United States; Enrico Asuncion; Chen Zhi-yi; Adrian Mar; Presley Smith; Garret Tan Lydia Chao; Jennie Gai; Lauren Lam; Allison Lee; Ella Lin	Brazil; Izak Batalha; Fabrício Farias; Jonathan Mathias; Davi Silva; Matheus Voigt; Ygor Coelho; João Mendonça; Joaquim Mendonça; Donnians Oliveira; Caio Henrique; Deivid Silva; Kauan Sttocco Jeisiane Alves; Jaqueline Lima; Sâmia Lima; Sânia Lima; Tamires Santos; Juliana Vieira; Rosalina de Souza; Ana Júlia Ywata
Men's singles	(Canada) Victor Lai	(Canada) Joshua Nguyen	(Canada) Brian Yang
Men's singles	(Canada) Victor Lai	(Canada) Joshua Nguyen	(Guatemala) Kevin Cordón
Women's singles	(Brazil) Juliana Vieira	(Canada) Wen Yu Zhang	(Canada) Michelle Li
Women's singles	(Brazil) Juliana Vieira	(Canada) Wen Yu Zhang	(Canada) Rachel Chan
Men's doubles	(United States) Chen Zhi-yi (United States) Presley Smith	(Brazil) Fabrício Farias (Brazil) Davi Silva	(Canada) Jonathan Lai (Canada) Nyl Yakura
Men's doubles	(United States) Chen Zhi-yi (United States) Presley Smith	(Brazil) Fabrício Farias (Brazil) Davi Silva	(Canada) Kevin Lee (Canada) Ty Alexander Lindeman
Women's doubles	(United States) Lauren Lam (United States) Allison Lee	(Canada) Jackie Dent (Canada) Crystal Lai	(Brazil) Jaqueline Lima (Brazil) Sâmia Lima
Women's doubles	(United States) Lauren Lam (United States) Allison Lee	(Canada) Jackie Dent (Canada) Crystal Lai	(Mexico) Romina Fregoso (Mexico) Miriam Rodríguez
Mixed doubles	(Canada) Ty Alexander Lindeman (Canada) Josephine Wu	(Canada) Jonathan Lai (Canada) Crystal Lai	(United States) Presley Smith (United States) Jennie Gai
Mixed doubles	(Canada) Ty Alexander Lindeman (Canada) Josephine Wu	(Canada) Jonathan Lai (Canada) Crystal Lai	(Brazil) Fabrício Farias (Brazil) Jaqueline Lima

Note: Names in italics indicate players who did not played a single match in the team event.

=== Medal table ===
* Host nations (Mexico, Peru)

Rank	Nation	Gold	Silver	Bronze	Total
1	Canada	3	4	5	12
2	United States	2	1	1	4
3	Brazil	1	1	3	5
4	Guatemala	0	0	1	1
4	Mexico*	0	0	1	1
Totals (5 entries)		6	6	11	23

== Men's singles ==
Seeds

1. (Canada) Brian Yang (semi-finals)
2. (El Salvador) Uriel Canjura (third round)
3. (Guatemala) Kevin Cordón (semi-finals)
4. (Peru) Adriano Viale (third round)
5. (Canada) Victor Lai (champion)
6. (Brazil) Jonathan Matias (second round)
7. (Brazil) Ygor Coelho (quarter-finals)
8. (United States) Enrico Asuncion (second round)

Finals

Semi-finals
1	(Canada) Brian Yang	21	13	13
(Canada) Joshua Nguyen	15	21	21
3	(Guatemala) Kevin Cordón	10	14
5	(Canada) Victor Lai	21	21

Final
(Canada) Joshua Nguyen	9	18
5	(Canada) Victor Lai	21	21

Top half
Section 1

First round
(Argentina) F Motto	21	21
(Venezuela) F Rodríguez	11	17
(El Salvador) M Calzadilla	11	6
(Mexico) N González	21	21

Second round
1	(Canada) B Yang	21	21
(Guatemala) Y del Cid	10	10
(Paraguay) L Lee	21	21
(Argentina) F Motto	14	14
8	(United States) E Asuncion	11	16
(Brazil) D Oliveira	21	21
(Peru) B Roque	11	26	16
(Mexico) N González	21	24	21

Third round
1	(Canada) B Yang	21	21
(Paraguay) L Lee	6	12
(Brazil) D Oliveira	21	21
(Mexico) N González	12	13

Quarter-finals
1	(Canada) B Yang	21	21
(Brazil) D Oliveira	17	7

Section 2

First round
(Canada) J Nguyen	21	21
(United States) A Chamakura	8	18
(Guatemala) R Espinoza	21	21
(Venezuela) J Pereira	10	17

Second round
4	(Peru) A Viale	21	21
(Mexico) L Montoya	16	13
(Argentina) S Otero	19	13
(Canada) J Nguyen	21	21
7	(Brazil) Y Coelho	24	21	21
(Peru) S Durand	26	16	10
(El Salvador) J Alas	21	21
(Guatemala) R Espinoza	16	12

Third round
4	(Peru) A Viale	21	6	12
(Canada) J Nguyen	16	21	21
7	(Brazil) Y Coelho	21	21
(El Salvador) J Alas	6	8

Quarter-finals
(Canada) J Nguyen	21	21
7	(Brazil) Y Coelho	19	18

Bottom half
Section 3

First round
(Mexico) L Garrido	21	21
(Peru) G Buendía	13	9
(Costa Rica) G Cavallotti	10	15
(United States) G Tan	21	21
(El Salvador) M Mejía	14	11
(Argentina) N Oliva	21	21

Second round
(Mexico) L Garrido	21	21
(Canada) S Yuan	14	14
(United States) G Tan	14	27	21
6	(Brazil) J Matias	21	25	17
(Argentina) N Oliva	21	21
(Peru) K Kuan-Veng	11	8
(Venezuela) G Albornoz	5	4
3	(Guatemala) K Cordón	21	21

Third round
(Mexico) L Garrido	21	19	21
(United States) G Tan	19	21	10
(Argentina) N Oliva	14	14
3	(Guatemala) K Cordón	21	21

Quarter-finals
(Mexico) L Garrido	16	11
3	(Guatemala) K Cordón	21	21

Section 4

First round
WDN	(Venezuela) J Wu Zheng
(Colombia) J Giraldo	w	/	o
(Brazil) De Silva	21	14	17
(Mexico) J Castillo	12	21	21

Second round
(Colombia) J Giraldo	21	21
(Argentina) S Liotini	7	7
(Peru) J Rendon	7	8
5	(Canada) V Lai	21	21
(Mexico) J Castillo	26	22	21
(United States) J Yang	24	24	10
(Barbados) K King	12	13
2	(El Salvador) U Canjura	21	21

Third round
(Colombia) J Giraldo	6	6
5	(Canada) V Lai	21	21
(Mexico) J Castillo	21	21
2	(El Salvador) U Canjura	15	18

Quarter-finals
5	(Canada) V Lai	21	21
(Mexico) J Castillo	13	6

== Women's singles ==
Seeds

1. (Canada) Michelle Li (semi-finals)
2. (United States) Lauren Lam (quarter-finals)
3. (Canada) Wen Yu Zhang (final)
4. (Brazil) Juliana Viana Vieira (champion)
5. (Canada) Rachel Chan (semi-finals)
6. (Peru) Inés Castillo (quarter-finals)
7. (United States) Disha Gupta (quarter-finals)
8. (United States) Isabelle Rusli (third round)

Finals

Semi-finals
1	(Canada) Michelle Li	21	21	19
4	(Brazil) Juliana Viana Vieira	18	23	21
3	(Canada) Wen Yu Zhang	21	18	21
5	(Canada) Rachel Chan	11	21	13

Final
4	(Brazil) Juliana Viana Vieira	21	15	21
3	(Canada) Wen Yu Zhang	19	21	8

Top half
Section 1

First round
(Guyana) P Ramdhani	7	8
(Peru) F Munar	21	21

Second round
1	(Canada) M Li	21	21
(Peru) T Kasianov	6	5
(El Salvador) G Barrios	22	6
(Guatemala) A Barrios	24	21
8	(United States) I Rusli	21	21
(Mexico) S Solís	11	15
(Venezuela) J Z Gabriela	21	23
(Peru) F Munar	19	21

Third round
1	(Canada) M Li	21	21
(Guatemala) A Barrios	7	5
8	(United States) I Rusli	14	17
(Venezuela) J Z Gabriela	21	21

Quarter-finals
1	(Canada) M Li	21	21
(Venezuela) J Z Gabriela	16	17

Section 2

First round
(Venezuela) M García	w	/	o
WDN	(Dominican Republic) D Acosta

Second round
4	(Brazil) J Vieira	21	21
(Mexico) C Madera	7	8
(Argentina) I Gualdi	7	5
(Canada) C Hoang	21	21
7	(United States) D Gupta	21	21
(Peru) R Munar	10	11
(El Salvador) M Revelo	21	23
(Venezuela) M García	19	21

Third round
4	(Brazil) J Vieira	21	21
(Canada) C Hoang	14	15
7	(United States) D Gupta	21	21
(El Salvador) M Revelo	9	10

Quarter-finals
4	(Brazil) J Vieira	21	21
7	(United States) D Gupta	14	17

Bottom half
Section 3

First round
(Colombia) J Giraldo	21	21
(Dominican Republic) A Acosta	9	14
(Venezuela) B Lamas	16	21	12
(El Salvador) D Hernández	21	9	21

Second round
(Colombia) J Giraldo	15	19
(United States) N Chi	21	21
(Mexico) V García	12	21	19
6	(Peru) I Castillo	21	16	21
(El Salvador) D Hernández	10	12
(Trinidad and Tobago) C De Boulet	21	21
(Guatemala) N Sotomayor	5	14
3	(Canada) W Y Zhang	21	21

Third round
(United States) N Chi	21	21	17
6	(Peru) I Castillo	13	23	21
(Trinidad and Tobago) C De Boulet	8	3
3	(Canada) W Y Zhang	21	21

Quarter-finals
6	(Peru) I Castillo	9	11
3	(Canada) W Y Zhang	21	21

Section 4

First round
(Peru) N Miyahira	21	21
(Mexico) M Macías	19	19

Second round
(Peru) N Miyahira	14	21	24
(Brazil) J Alves	21	19	26
(Argentina) A Oliva	4	6
5	(Canada) R Chan	21	21
(Venezuela) M Rojas	15	15
(El Salvador) F Centeno	21	21
(Peru) N Junco	11	7
2	(United States) L Lam	21	21

Third round
(Brazil) J Alves	8	5
5	(Canada) R Chan	21	21
(El Salvador) F Centeno	8	3
2	(United States) L Lam	21	21

Quarter-finals
5	(Canada) R Chan	21	21
2	(United States) L Lam	9	7

== Men's doubles ==
Seeds

1. (United States) Chen Zhi-yi / Presley Smith (champions)
2. (Canada) Kevin Lee / Ty Alexander Lindeman (semi-finals)
3. (Brazil) Fabrício Farias / Davi Silva (final)
4. (Guatemala) Christopher Martínez / Jonathan Solís (second round)

Finals

Semi-finals
1	(United States) Chen Zhi-yi (United States) Presley Smith	21	21	21
(Canada) Jonathan Lai (Canada) Nyl Yakura	10	23	11
3	(Brazil) Fabrício Farias (Brazil) Davi Silva	19	21	21
2	(Canada) Kevin Lee (Canada) Ty Alexander Lindeman	21	17	11

Final
1	(United States) Chen Zhi-yi (United States) Presley Smith	21	21
3	(Brazil) Fabrício Farias (Brazil) Davi Silva	16	6

Top half
Section 1

First round

Second round
1	(United States) Chen Z-y (United States) P Smith	21	21
(Brazil) I Batalha (Brazil) M Voigt	14	13
(Argentina) N Oliva (Argentina) S Otero	21	21
(Peru) S Durand (Peru) B Roque	13	17

Quarter-finals
1	(United States) Chen Z-y (United States) P Smith	21	21
(Argentina) N Oliva (Argentina) S Otero	9	15

Section 2

First round
WDN	(Venezuela) J Pereira (Venezuela) J Wu Zheng
(Mexico) E García (Mexico) M Peregrina	w	/	o

Second round
4	(Guatemala) C Martínez (Guatemala) J Solís	18	22	15
(Canada) J Lai (Canada) N Yakura	21	20	21
(Barbados) K King (Barbados) S Martin	16	21	13
(Mexico) E García (Mexico) M Peregrina	21	18	21

Quarter-finals
(Canada) J Lai (Canada) N Yakura	21	21
(Mexico) E García (Mexico) M Peregrina	8	5

Bottom half
Section 3

First round
(United States) A Lee (United States) S Li	21	21
(Argentina) S Liotini (Argentina) F Motto	15	11

Second round
(United States) A Lee (United States) S Li	21	21
(Peru) G Buendía (Peru) G Castillo	12	15
(Venezuela) G Albornoz (Venezuela) F Rodríguez	3	4
3	(Brazil) F Farias (Brazil) Da Silva	21	21

Quarter-finals
(United States) A Lee (United States) S Li	13	16
3	(Brazil) F Farias (Brazil) Da Silva	21	21

Section 4

First round

Second round
(Peru) J Guevara (Peru) D Subauste	18	18
(Mexico) J Castillo (Mexico) J Torres	21	21
(El Salvador) J Alas (El Salvador) M Mejía	12	1
2	(Canada) K Lee (Canada) T A Lindeman	21	21

Quarter-finals
(Mexico) J Castillo (Mexico) J Torres	9	12
2	(Canada) K Lee (Canada) T A Lindeman	21	21

== Women's doubles ==
Seeds

1. (Canada) Jackie Dent / Crystal Lai (final)
2. (Canada) Jacqueline Cheung / Catherine Choi (quarter-finals)
3. (Brazil) Jaqueline Lima / Sâmia Lima (semi-finals)
4. (Mexico) Romina Fregoso / Miriam Rodríguez (semi-finals)

Finals

Semi-finals
1	(Canada) Jackie Dent (Canada) Crystal Lai	21	21
3	(Brazil) Jaqueline Lima (Brazil) Sâmia Lima	10	8
4	(Mexico) Romina Fregoso (Mexico) Miriam Rodríguez	8	8
(United States) Lauren Lam (United States) Allison Lee	21	21

Final
1	(Canada) Jackie Dent (Canada) Crystal Lai	11	13
(United States) Lauren Lam (United States) Allison Lee	21	21

Top half
Section 1

First round

Second round
1	(Canada) J Dent (Canada) C Lai	21	21
(United States) K Ngo (United States) J Siu	11	7
(Peru) R Castañeda (Peru) A Yi	19	10
(Mexico) C Madera (Mexico) I Puente	21	21

Quarter-finals
1	(Canada) J Dent (Canada) C Lai	21	21
(Mexico) C Madera (Mexico) I Puente	12	1

Section 2

First round
(Peru) F Munar (Peru) R Munar	21	21
(Venezuela) M García (Venezuela) M Rojas	19	14

Second round
3	(Brazil) J Lima (Brazil) Sâm Lima	w	/	o
WDN	(Dominican Republic) A Acosta (Dominican Republic) D Acosta
(El Salvador) F Centeno (El Salvador) D Hernández	14	16
(Peru) F Munar (Peru) R Munar	21	21

Quarter-finals
3	(Brazil) J Lima (Brazil) Sâm Lima	24	21
(Peru) F Munar (Peru) R Munar	22	19

Bottom half
Section 3

First round
(El Salvador) G Barrios (El Salvador) M Revelo	5	9
(Guatemala) D Corleto (Guatemala) N Sotomayor	21	21

Second round
(Guatemala) D Corleto (Guatemala) N Sotomayor	21	15	21
(Peru) I Castillo (Peru) N Miyahira	12	21	16
(Argentina) I Gualdi (Argentina) A Oliva	6	10
4	(Mexico) R Fregoso (Mexico) M Rodríguez	21	21

Quarter-finals
(Guatemala) D Corleto (Guatemala) N Sotomayor	17	15
4	(Mexico) R Fregoso (Mexico) M Rodríguez	21	21

Section 4

First round
(Trinidad and Tobago) C De Boulet (Guyana) P Ramdhani	7	5
(United States) L Lam (United States) A Lee	21	21

Second round
(United States) L Lam (United States) A Lee	21	21
(Venezuela) J Z Gabriela (Venezuela) B Lamas	11	7
(Brazil) Sân Lima (Brazil) J Vieira	17	15
2	(Canada) J Cheung (Canada) C Choi	21	21

Quarter-finals
(United States) L Lam (United States) A Lee	21	21
2	(Canada) J Cheung (Canada) C Choi	11	10

== Mixed doubles ==
Seeds

1. (United States) Presley Smith / Jennie Gai (semi-finals)
2. (Brazil) Fabrício Farias / Jaqueline Lima (semi-finals)
3. (Canada) Ty Alexander Lindeman / Josephine Wu (champions)
4. (Canada) Jonathan Lai / Crystal Lai (final)
5. (Canada) Kevin Lee / Eliana Zhang (quarter-finals)
6. (United States) Chen Zhi-yi / Francesca Corbett (quarter-finals)
7. (Mexico) Luis Montoya / Miriam Rodríguez (second round)
8. (United States) Linden Wang / Eva Wang (quarter-finals)

Finals

Semi-finals
1	(United States) Presley Smith (United States) Jennie Gai	22	17	18
3	(Canada) Ty Alexander Lindeman (Canada) Josephine Wu	20	21	21
4	(Canada) Jonathan Lai (Canada) Crystal Lai	21	15	21
2	(Brazil) Fabrício Farias (Brazil) Jaqueline Lima	17	21	19

Final
3	(Canada) Ty Alexander Lindeman (Canada) Josephine Wu	21	21
4	(Canada) Jonathan Lai (Canada) Crystal Lai	15	15

Top half
Section 1

First round
1	(United States) P Smith (United States) J Gai	21	21
(El Salvador) J Alas (El Salvador) F Centeno	6	12
(Peru) J Guevara (Peru) F Munar	21	21
(Brazil) M Voigt (Brazil) T Santos	19	16
5	(Canada) K Lee (Canada) E Zhang	21	21
(Peru) J Rendon (Peru) A Yi	9	15
(Argentina) N Oliva (Argentina) A Oliva	w	/	o
WDN	(Venezuela) J Wu Zheng (Venezuela) J Z Gabriela

Second round
1	(United States) P Smith (United States) J Gai	21	21
(Peru) J Guevara (Peru) F Munar	15	8
5	(Canada) K Lee (Canada) E Zhang	21	21
(Argentina) N Oliva (Argentina) A Oliva	15	9

Quarter-finals
1	(United States) P Smith (United States) J Gai	21	21
5	(Canada) K Lee (Canada) E Zhang	14	9

Section 2

First round
3	(Canada) T A Lindeman (Canada) J Wu	21	21
(Venezuela) J Pereira (Venezuela) M García	10	10
(Guatemala) C Martínez (Guatemala) D Corleto	21	21
(El Salvador) M Calzadilla (El Salvador) M Revelo	11	7
7	(Mexico) L Montoya (Mexico) M Rodríguez	21	21
(Peru) D Subauste (Peru) R Munar	17	14
(United States) A Lee (United States) K Ngo	15	13
(Brazil) Da Silva (Brazil) Sân Lima	21	21

Second round
3	(Canada) T A Lindeman (Canada) J Wu	21	18	21
(Guatemala) C Martínez (Guatemala) D Corleto	14	21	14
7	(Mexico) L Montoya (Mexico) M Rodríguez	18	21	21
(Brazil) Da Silva (Brazil) Sân Lima	21	12	23

Quarter-finals
3	(Canada) T A Lindeman (Canada) J Wu	16	21	21
(Brazil) Da Silva (Brazil) Sân Lima	21	18	14

Bottom half
Section 3

First round
(Peru) S Durand (Peru) N Miyahira	21	21
(Colombia) Je Giraldo (Colombia) Ju Giraldo	11	11
(Venezuela) G Albornoz (Venezuela) M Rojas	8	9
8	(United States) L Wang (United States) E Wang	21	21
(Argentina) S Otero (Argentina) I Gualdi	21	15	21
(Guatemala) Y del Cid (Guatemala) A Barrios	18	21	13
(Brazil) De Silva (Brazil) Sâm Lima	11	22
4	(Canada) J Lai (Canada) C Lai	21	24

Second round
(Peru) S Durand (Peru) N Miyahira	16	21
8	(United States) L Wang (United States) E Wang	21	23
(Argentina) S Otero (Argentina) I Gualdi	9	9
4	(Canada) J Lai (Canada) C Lai	21	21

Quarter-finals
8	(United States) L Wang (United States) E Wang	9	11
4	(Canada) J Lai (Canada) C Lai	21	21

Section 4

First round
(El Salvador) M Mejía (El Salvador) D Hernández	17	21	21
(Peru) M Martin (Peru) R Castañeda	21	18	16
(Mexico) N González (Mexico) V García	10	12
6	(United States) Chen Z-y (United States) F Corbett	21	21
(Canada) T Lock (Canada) C Huang	21	21
(Venezuela) F Rodríguez (Venezuela) B Lamas	8	7
(Peru) G Buendía (Peru) N Junco	18	16
2	(Brazil) F Farias (Brazil) J Lima	21	21

Second round
(El Salvador) M Mejía (El Salvador) D Hernández	10	7
6	(United States) Chen Z-y (United States) F Corbett	21	21
(Canada) T Lock (Canada) C Huang	21	14	16
2	(Brazil) F Farias (Brazil) J Lima	19	21	21

Quarter-finals
6	(United States) Chen Z-y (United States) F Corbett	21	14	18
2	(Brazil) F Farias (Brazil) J Lima	17	21	21

== Team event ==
=== Group A ===
Pos	Team	Pld	W	L	MF	MA	MD	GF	GA	GD	PF	PA	PD	Pts	Qualification
1	Canada	2	2	0	10	0	+10	20	2	+18	457	257	+200	2	Knockout stage
2	Mexico (H)	2	1	1	4	6	−2	10	12	−2	379	371	+8	1	Knockout stage
3	Cuba	2	0	2	1	9	−8	2	18	−16	202	410	−208	0	

Source: BWF
(H) Host

Canada vs Mexico

Canada
5
Gimnasio Olímpico Aguascalientes - Court 1
13 February 2025, 10:00 UTC−6

Mexico
0

			1	2	3
1	(Canada) (Mexico)	Ty Alexander Lindeman / Josephine Wu; Maximiliano Peregrina / Miriam Rodríguez	21; 14	21; 8
2	(Canada) (Mexico)	Brian Yang; Job Castillo	21; 15	21; 9
3	(Canada) (Mexico)	Wenyu Zhang; Vanessa García	24; 22	14; 21	21; 16
4	(Canada) (Mexico)	Jonathan Lai / Nyl Yakura; Job Castillo / Juan Torres	20; 22	21; 12	21; 15
5	(Canada) (Mexico)	Jackie Dent / Crystal Lai; Romina Fregoso / Miriam Rodríguez	21; 14	21; 11

Cuba vs Mexico

Cuba
1
Gimnasio Olímpico Aguascalientes - Court 1
13 February 2025, 15:00 UTC−6

Mexico
4

			1	2	3
1	(Cuba) (Mexico)	Juan Bencomo / Leyanis Contreras; Maximiliano Peregrina / Miriam Rodríguez	15; 21	15; 21
2	(Cuba) (Mexico)	Roberto Herrera; Edwin García	21; 15	21; 17
3	(Cuba) (Mexico)	Alina Sanz; Mayté Macias	1; 21	7; 21
4	(Cuba) (Mexico)	Juan Bencomo / Roberto Herrera; Job Castillo / Néstor González	12; 21	14; 21
5	(Cuba) (Mexico)	Leyanis Contreras / Alina Sanz; Cecilia Madera / Isabella Puente	8; 21	10; 21

Canada vs Cuba

Canada
5
Gimnasio Olímpico Aguascalientes - Court 2
14 February 2025, 10:00 UTC−6

Cuba
0

			1	2	3
1	(Canada) (Cuba)	Kevin Lee / Eliana Zhang; Juan Bencomo / Leyanis Contreras	21; 7	21; 6
2	(Canada) (Cuba)	Victor Lai; Leandro Gil	21; 4	21; 7
3	(Canada) (Cuba)	Michelle Li; Alina Sanz	21; 10	21; 9
4	(Canada) (Cuba)	Kevin Lee / Ty Alexander Lindeman; Juan Bencomo / Roberto Herrera	21; 13	21; 6
5	(Canada) (Cuba)	Jacqueline Cheung / Catherine Choi; Leyanis Contreras / Alina Sanz	21; 10	21; 6

=== Group B ===
Pos	Team	Pld	W	L	MF	MA	MD	GF	GA	GD	PF	PA	PD	Pts	Qualification
1	United States	2	2	0	9	1	+8	18	2	+16	409	200	+209	2	Knockout stage
2	Guatemala	2	1	1	6	4	+2	12	8	+4	356	303	+53	1	Knockout stage
3	Costa Rica	2	0	2	0	10	−10	0	20	−20	158	420	−262	0	

Source: BWF

United States vs Costa Rica

United States
5
Gimnasio Olímpico Aguascalientes - Court 3
13 February 2025, 10:00 UTC−6

Costa Rica
0

			1	2	3
1	(United States) (Costa Rica)	Enrico Asuncion / Garret Tan; José Cambronero / Ethan Jiménez	21; 4	21; 9
2	(United States) (Costa Rica)	Lauren Lam; Lauren Villalobos	21; 3	21; 5
3	(United States) (Costa Rica)	Adrian Mar; Gianpiero Cavallotti	21; 9	21; 9
4	(United States) (Costa Rica)	Allison Lee / Ella Lin; Alison Jiménez / Kimberly Vindas	21; 3	21; 4
5	(United States) (Costa Rica)	Presley Smith / Jennie Gai; Gianpiero Cavallotti / Lauren Villalobos	21; 3	21; 5

Guatemala vs Costa Rica

Guatemala
5
Gimnasio Olímpico Aguascalientes - Court 3
13 February 2025, 15:00 UTC−6

Costa Rica
0

			1	2	3
1	(Guatemala) (Costa Rica)	Christopher Martínez / Jonathan Solís; José Cambronero / Ethan Jiménez	21; 10	21; 7
2	(Guatemala) (Costa Rica)	Fátima Gutiérrez; Lauren Villalobos	21; 10	21; 12
3	(Guatemala) (Costa Rica)	Kevin Cordón; Gianpiero Cavallotti	21; 13	21; 12
4	(Guatemala) (Costa Rica)	Diana Corleto / Nikté Sotomayor; Alison Jiménez / Kimberly Vindas	21; 7	21; 5
5	(Guatemala) (Costa Rica)	Ramiro Espinoza / Adriana Barrios; Gianpiero Cavallotti / Lauren Villalobos	21; 19	21; 9

United States vs Guatemala

United States
4
Gimnasio Olímpico Aguascalientes - Court 1
14 February 2025, 10:00 UTC−6

Guatemala
1

			1	2	3
1	(United States) (Guatemala)	Presley Smith / Jennie Gai; Christopher Martínez / Diana Corleto	21; 15	21; 13
2	(United States) (Guatemala)	Enrico Asuncion; Kevin Cordón	18; 21	13; 21
3	(United States) (Guatemala)	Ella Lin; Nikté Sotomayor	21; 15	21; 14
4	(United States) (Guatemala)	Chen Zhi-yi / Presley Smith; Christopher Martínez / Jonathan Solís	21; 17	21; 10
5	(United States) (Guatemala)	Lauren Lam / Allison Lee; Diana Corleto / Nikté Sotomayor	21; 12	21; 8

=== Group C ===
Pos	Team	Pld	W	L	MF	MA	MD	GF	GA	GD	PF	PA	PD	Pts	Qualification
1	Brazil	2	2	0	9	1	+8	19	4	+15	458	303	+155	2	Knockout stage
2	Peru	2	1	1	5	5	0	12	11	+1	394	391	+3	1	Knockout stage
3	El Salvador	2	0	2	1	9	−8	3	19	−16	283	441	−158	0	

Source: BWF

Brazil vs El Salvador

Brazil
5
Gimnasio Olímpico Aguascalientes - Court 2
13 February 2025, 10:00 UTC−6

El Salvador
0

			1	2	3
1	(Brazil) (El Salvador)	Izak Batalha / Matheus Voigt; Javier Alas / Manuel Mejía	21; 10	21; 12
2	(Brazil) (El Salvador)	Juliana Vieira; Gabriela Barrios	21; 2	21; 6
3	(Brazil) (El Salvador)	Jonathan Matias; Uriel Canjura	21; 9	16; 21	21; 17
4	(Brazil) (El Salvador)	Sânia Lima / Tamires Santos; Gabriela Barrios / Margareth Revelo	21; 11	21; 11
5	(Brazil) (El Salvador)	Fabrício Farias / Jaqueline Lima; Manuel Mejía / Daniela Hernández	21; 16	21; 9

Peru vs El Salvador

Peru
4
Gimnasio Olímpico Aguascalientes - Court 2
13 February 2025, 15:00 UTC−6

El Salvador
1

			1	2	3
1	(Peru) (El Salvador)	José Guevara / Diego Subauste; Javier Alas / Manuel Mejía	21; 13	21; 17
2	(Peru) (El Salvador)	Inés Castillo; Margareth Revelo	21; 13	21; 11
3	(Peru) (El Salvador)	Adriano Viale; Uriel Canjura	11; 21	21; 18	15; 21
4	(Peru) (El Salvador)	Fernanda Munar / Rafaela Munar; Daniela Hernández / Margareth Revelo	21; 15	21; 7
5	(Peru) (El Salvador)	José Guevara / Inés Castillo; Javier Alas / Gabriela Barrios	21; 9	21; 14

Brazil vs Peru

Brazil
4
Gimnasio Olímpico Aguascalientes - Court 3
14 February 2025, 10:00 UTC−6

Peru
1

			1	2	3
1	(Brazil) (Peru)	Fabrício Farias / Jaqueline Lima; José Guevara / Namie Miyahira	21; 11	21; 12
2	(Brazil) (Peru)	Jonathan Matias; Adriano Viale	15; 21	21; 15	21; 14
3	(Brazil) (Peru)	Juliana Vieira; Inés Castillo	21; 18	12; 21	16; 21
4	(Brazil) (Peru)	Fabrício Farias / Davi Silva; Diego Subauste / Adriano Viale	21; 13	21; 11
5	(Brazil) (Peru)	Jaqueline Lima / Sâmia Lima; Naomi Junco / Rafaela Munar	21; 13	21; 9

=== 7th to 9th ===
Semi-finals 7th-9th
8	Cuba	3
9	Costa Rica	0

Final 7th-8th
7	El Salvador	3
Cuba	0

Cuba vs Costa Rica

Cuba
3
Gimnasio Olímpico Aguascalientes - Court 3
14 February 2025, 15:00 UTC−6

Costa Rica
0

			1	2	3
1	(Cuba) (Costa Rica)	Roberto Herrera / Leyanis Contreras; Gianpiero Cavallotti / Lauren Villalobos	21; 10	18; 21	21; 7
2	(Cuba) (Costa Rica)	Alina Sanz; Kimberly Vindas	25; 23	21; 11
3	(Cuba) (Costa Rica)	Roberto Herrera; Gianpiero Cavallotti	21; 17	21; 13
4	(Cuba) (Costa Rica)	Leyanis Contreras / Alina Sanz; Alison Jiménez / Lauren Villalobos				not played
5	(Cuba) (Costa Rica)	Juan Bencomo / Leandro Gil; José Cambronero / Ethan Jiménez				not played

El Salvador vs Cuba

El Salvador
3
Gimnasio Olímpico Aguascalientes - Court 3
15 February 2025, 15:00 UTC−6

Cuba
0

			1	2	3
1	(El Salvador) (Cuba)	Manuel Mejía / Daniela Hernández; Roberto Herrera / Leyanis Contreras	21; 18	21; 18
2	(El Salvador) (Cuba)	Javier Alas; Leandro Gil	21; 11	23; 21
3	(El Salvador) (Cuba)	Margareth Revelo; Alina Sanz	21; 12	21; 19
4	(El Salvador) (Cuba)	Javier Alas / Manuel Mejía; Juan Bencomo / Roberto Herrera				not played
5	(El Salvador) (Cuba)	Gabriela Barrios / Daniela Hernández; Leyanis Contreras / Alina Sanz				not played

=== Knockout stage ===
Quarter-finals
Peru	2
Guatemala	3
Mexico	0
Brazil	3

Semifinals
Canada	3
Guatemala	1
United States	3
Brazil	1
Play-off 5/6
Peru	1
Mexico	3

Final
Canada	3
United States	1
Play-off 3/4
Guatemala	0
Brazil	3

=== Quarter-finals ===
Peru vs Guatemala

Peru
2
Gimnasio Olímpico Aguascalientes - Court 2
14 February 2025, 15:00 UTC−6

Guatemala
3

			1	2	3
1	(Peru) (Guatemala)	José Guevara / Inés Castillo; Christopher Martínez / Diana Corleto	15; 21	15; 21
2	(Peru) (Guatemala)	Adriano Viale; Kevin Cordón	23; 21	21; 19
3	(Peru) (Guatemala)	Inés Castillo; Adriana Barrios	21; 11	21; 14
4	(Peru) (Guatemala)	José Guevara / Diego Subauste; Christopher Martínez / Jonathan Solís	14; 21	5; 21
5	(Peru) (Guatemala)	Fernanda Munaro / Rafaela Munar; Diana Corleto / Nikté Sotomayor	22; 20	14; 21	10; 21

Mexico vs Brazil

Mexico
0
Gimnasio Olímpico Aguascalientes - Court 1
14 February 2025, 15:00 UTC−6

Brazil
3

			1	2	3
1	(Mexico) (Brazil)	Job Castillo / Miriam Rodríguez; Davi Silva / Sânia Lima	11; 21	11; 21
2	(Mexico) (Brazil)	Néstor González; Jonathan Matias	9; 21	8; 21
3	(Mexico) (Brazil)	Job Castillo / Juan Torres; Fabrício Farias / Davi Silva	12; 21	12; 21
4	(Mexico) (Brazil)	Vanessa García; Jeisiane Alves				not played
5	(Mexico) (Brazil)	Romina Fregoso / Miriam Rodríguez; Jaqueline Lima / Sâmia Lima				not played

=== Semi-finals ===
Canada vs Guatemala

Canada
3
Gimnasio Olímpico Aguascalientes - Court 2
15 February 2025, 10:00 UTC−6

Guatemala
1

			1	2	3
1	(Canada) (Guatemala)	Ty Alexander Lindeman / Crystal Lai; Christopher Martínez / Diana Corleto	22; 20	21; 15
2	(Canada) (Guatemala)	Brian Yang; Kevin Cordón	10; 21	21; 6	17; 21
3	(Canada) (Guatemala)	Michelle Li; Nikté Sotomayor	21; 12	21; 15
4	(Canada) (Guatemala)	Jonathan Lai / Nyl Yakura; Christopher Martínez / Jonathan Solís	18; 21	21; 17	21; 19
5	(Canada) (Guatemala)	Jacqueline Cheung / Catherine Choi; Diana Corleto / Nikté Sotomayor				not played

Brazil vs United States

Brazil
1
Gimnasio Olímpico Aguascalientes - Court 1
15 February 2025, 10:00 UTC−6

United States
3

			1	2	3
1	(Brazil) (United States)	Fabrício Farias / Davi Silva; Chen Zhi-yi / Presley Smith	19; 21	15; 21
2	(Brazil) (United States)	Jeisiane Alves; Ella Lin	9; 21	19; 21
3	(Brazil) (United States)	Jonathan Matias; Garret Tan	21; 18	21; 14
4	(Brazil) (United States)	Jaqueline Lima / Sâmia Lima; Lauren Lam / Allison Lee	18; 21	16; 21
5	(Brazil) (United States)	Davi Silva / Sânia Lima; Presley Smith / Jennie Gai				not played

=== Play-off 5/6 ===
Peru vs Mexico

Peru
1
Gimnasio Olímpico Aguascalientes - Court 4
15 February 2025, 15:00 UTC−6

Mexico
3

			1	2	3
1	(Peru) (Mexico)	José Guevara / Namie Miyahira; Maximiliano Peregrina / Miriam Rodríguez	19; 21	21; 14	15; 21
2	(Peru) (Mexico)	Adriano Viale; Job Castillo	20; 22	18; 21
3	(Peru) (Mexico)	Inés Castillo; Vanessa García	15; 21	21; 13	21; 11
4	(Peru) (Mexico)	Diego Subauste / Adriano Viale; Job Castillo / Juan Torres	19; 21	13; 21
5	(Peru) (Mexico)	Fernanda Munar / Rafaela Munar; Romina Fregoso / Miriam Rodríguez				not played

=== Play-off 3/4 ===
Guatemala vs Brazil

Guatemala
0
Gimnasio Olímpico Aguascalientes - Court 3
15 February 2025, 15:00 UTC−6

Brazil
3

			1	2	3
1	(Guatemala) (Brazil)	Christopher Martínez / Diana Corleto; Davi Silva / Sânia Lima	11; 21	10; 21
2	(Guatemala) (Brazil)	Ramiro Espinoza; Jonathan Matias	13; 21	7; 21
3	(Guatemala) (Brazil)	Nikté Sotomayor; Jeisiane Alves	21; 13	18; 21	12; 21
4	(Guatemala) (Brazil)	Christopher Martínez / Jonathan Solís; Fabrício Farias / Davi Silva				not played
5	(Guatemala) (Brazil)	Diana Corleto / Nikté Sotomayor; Jaqueline Lima / Sâmia Lima				not played

=== Final ===
Canada vs United States

Canada
3
Gimnasio Olímpico Aguascalientes - Court 1
16 February 2025, 10:00 UTC−6

United States
1

			1	2	3
1	(Canada) (United States)	Ty Alexander Lindeman / Crystal Lai; Presley Smith / Jennie Gai	17; 21	12; 21
2	(Canada) (United States)	Brian Yang; Enrico Asuncion	21; 3	21; 12
3	(Canada) (United States)	Kevin Lee / Ty Alexander Lindeman; Chen Zhi-yi / Presley Smith	21; 15	18; 21	21; 19
4	(Canada) (United States)	Michelle Li; Lydia Chao	21; 10	21; 8
5	(Canada) (United States)	Jackie Dent / Crystal Lai; Lauren Lam / Allison Lee				not played

=== Final ranking ===
Pos	Team	Pld	W	L	Pts	MD	GD	PD
1st place, gold medalist(s)	Canada	4	4	0	4	+14	+25	+269
2nd place, silver medalist(s)	United States	4	3	1	3	+8	+17	+186
3rd place, bronze medalist(s)	Brazil	5	4	1	4	+12	+22	+245
4	Guatemala	5	2	3	2	−2	−4	+10
5	Mexico	4	2	2	2	−3	−3	−51
6	Peru	4	1	3	1	−3	−4	−31
7	El Salvador	3	1	2	1	−5	−10	−129
8	Cuba	4	1	3	1	−8	−17	−191
9	Costa Rica	3	0	3	0	−13	−25	−308
