= 2026 Pan Am Male & Female Badminton Cup =

Tournament details
- Dates: 12–15 February 2026
- Edition: 3
- Venue: Gimnasio Teodoro Palacios Flores
- Location: Guatemala City, Guatemala

Champions
- Men's teams: Canada
- Women's teams: Canada

The 2026 Pan Am Male & Female Badminton Cup was a continental badminton team tournament to crown the best men's and women's team for the Americas. The tournament also served as the Pan American qualifiers for the 2026 Thomas & Uber Cup to be held in Horsens, Denmark. It was held in Guatemala City, Guatemala from 12 to 15 February 2026.

== Medalists ==
Event	Gold	Silver	Bronze
Men's team	Canada; Kiren DeRaj; Jonathan Lai; Victor Lai; Kevin Lee; Daniel Leung; Ty Alexander Lindeman; Timothy Lock; Joshua Nguyen; Nyl Yakura; Brian Yang	United States; Mark Alcala; Enrico Asuncion; Chen Zhi-yi; Jay Chun; Arden Lee; Adrian Mar; Presley Smith; Garret Tan; Stanley Xing; Joshua Yang	Brazil; Izak Batalha; Fabrício Farias; Jonathan Matias; João Mendonça; Joaquim Mendonça; Welton Menezes; Donnians Oliveira; Davi Silva; Deivid Silva; Matheus Voigt
Women's team	Canada; Rachel Chan; Catherine Choi; Jackie Dent; Chloe Hoang; Crystal Lai; Michelle Li; Josephine Wu; Eliana Zhang; Wen Yu Zhang	United States; Audrey Chang; Koyu Chou; Francesca Corbett; Micah Cruz; Jennie Gai; Lauren Lam; Allison Lee; Ella Lin; Sophia Wu; Beiwen Zhang	Brazil; Jeisiane Alves; Vivian Iha; Jaqueline Lima; Sâmia Lima; Sânia Lima; Juliana Murosaki; Tamires Santos; Juliana Vieira; Ana Júlia Ywata

=== Medal table ===
* Host nation (Guatemala)

Rank	Nation	Gold	Silver	Bronze	Total
1	Canada	2	0	0	2
2	United States	0	2	0	2
3	Brazil	0	0	2	2
Totals (3 entries)		2	2	2	6

== Tournament ==
The team event of 2026 Pan Am Badminton Championships officially named Pan Am M&F Cup 2026, is a continental qualification tournament of 2026 Thomas & Uber Cup, and also to crown the best men's and women's badminton team in Pan America. This event was organized by Badminton Pan America and the National Badminton Federation of Guatemala.

=== Venue ===
- The team event is being held at Gimnasio Teodoro Palacios Flores in Guatemala City, Guatemala.

=== Teams ===
A total of 19 teams, consisting of 12 men's teams and 10 women's teams entered the tournament. Honduras made their international team debut with both their men's and women's teams competing in the championships for the first time. Cuba and Suriname withdrew from the tournament.

==== Men's team ====
- Brazil
- Canada
- Colombia
- Costa Rica
- Cuba (withdrew)
- El Salvador
- Guatemala
- Honduras
- Mexico
- Peru
- United States
- Suriname (withdrew)

==== Women's team ====
- Brazil
- Canada
- Colombia
- Cuba (withdrew)
- El Salvador
- Guatemala
- Honduras
- Mexico
- Peru
- United States

=== Seeds ===
- Men's team
1. Canada
2. Brazil
3. Mexico
4. Guatemala
5. United States
6. Peru
7. El Salvador
- Women's team
1. Canada
2. United States
3. Brazil
4. Peru
5. Mexico
6. El Salvador

=== Draw ===
The draw was held on 11 February 2026 at Gimnasio Teodoro Palacios Flores in Guatemala City, Guatemala during the Team Managers meeting. Both the men's team and the women's team group stage consists of three groups.

- Men's team

Group A	Group B	Group C
Canada; El Salvador; United States	Brazil; Costa Rica; Peru	Colombia; Guatemala; Honduras; Mexico

- Women's team

Group A	Group B	Group C
Canada; Colombia; Peru	El Salvador; Honduras; United States	Brazil; Guatemala; Mexico

== Male Cup ==
All times are Central Standard Time (UTC−06:00).

=== Group stage ===
==== Group A ====
Pos	Team	Pld	W	L	MF	MA	MD	GF	GA	GD	PF	PA	PD	Pts	Qualification
1	Canada	2	2	0	8	2	+6	16	4	+12	397	277	+120	2	Semi-finals
2	United States	2	1	1	6	4	+2	12	8	+4	353	294	+59	1	Quarter-finals
3	El Salvador	2	0	2	1	9	−8	2	18	−16	226	405	−179	0	7th–10th place

Source: Badminton World Federation

Canada
5
Gimnasio Teodoro Palacios Flores, Court 1
12 February 2026, 12:00

El Salvador
0

			1	2	3
1	(Canada) (El Salvador)	Brian Yang; Uriel Canjura	21; 12	21; 17
2	(Canada) (El Salvador)	Joshua Nguyen; Javier Alas	21; 14	21; 17
3	(Canada) (El Salvador)	Timothy Lock; Manuel Mejía	21; 7	21; 9
4	(Canada) (El Salvador)	Kevin Lee / Ty Alexander Lindeman; Javier Alas / Melvin Calzadilla	21; 12	21; 10
5	(Canada) (El Salvador)	Kiren DeRaj / Daniel Leung; Uriel Canjura / Manuel Mejía	21; 13	21; 8

United States
4
Gimnasio Teodoro Palacios Flores, Court 1
12 February 2026, 18:00

El Salvador
1

			1	2	3
1	(United States) (El Salvador)	Enrico Asuncion; Uriel Canjura	11; 21	16; 21
2	(United States) (El Salvador)	Adrian Mar; Javier Alas	21; 8	21; 10
3	(United States) (El Salvador)	Jay Chun; Melvin Calzadilla	21; 5	21; 5
4	(United States) (El Salvador)	Arden Lee / Stanley Xing; Javier Alas / Uriel Canjura	21; 11	21; 18
5	(United States) (El Salvador)	Chen Zhi-yi / Presley Smith; Melvin Calzadilla / Manuel Mejía	21; 5	21; 3

Canada
3
Gimnasio Teodoro Palacios Flores, Court 2
13 February 2026, 12:00

United States
2

			1	2	3
1	(Canada) (United States)	Victor Lai; Mark Alcala	21; 9	21; 7
2	(Canada) (United States)	Kevin Lee / Ty Alexander Lindeman; Chen Zhi-yi / Presley Smith	14; 21	12; 21
3	(Canada) (United States)	Brian Yang; Garret Tan	21; 12	21; 19
4	(Canada) (United States)	Jonathan Lai / Nyl Yakura; Arden Lee / Stanley Xing	17; 21	18; 21
5	(Canada) (United States)	Joshua Nguyen; Joshua Yang	21; 15	21; 12

==== Group B ====
Pos	Team	Pld	W	L	MF	MA	MD	GF	GA	GD	PF	PA	PD	Pts	Qualification
1	Brazil	2	2	0	10	0	+10	20	1	+19	435	237	+198	2	Semi-finals
2	Peru	2	1	1	5	5	0	11	10	+1	371	297	+74	1	Quarter-finals
3	Costa Rica	2	0	2	0	10	−10	0	20	−20	148	420	−272	0	7th–10th place

Source: Badminton World Federation

Brazil
5
Gimnasio Teodoro Palacios Flores, Court 2
12 February 2026, 12:00

Peru
0

			1	2	3
1	(Brazil) (Peru)	Jonathan Matias; Adriano Viale	15; 21	21; 14	21; 19
2	(Brazil) (Peru)	Donnians Oliveira; Guillermo Buendía	21; 13	21; 17
3	(Brazil) (Peru)	Deivid Silva; Sharum Durand	21; 11	21; 12
4	(Brazil) (Peru)	Fabrício Farias / Davi Silva; José Guevara / Adriano Viale	21; 15	21; 13
5	(Brazil) (Peru)	Izak Batalha / Matheus Voigt; Sharum Durand / Diego Subauste	21; 16	21; 10

Costa Rica
0
Gimnasio Teodoro Palacios Flores, Court 3
12 February 2026, 18:00

Peru
5

			1	2	3
1	(Costa Rica) (Peru)	José Fabricio Cambronero; Adriano Viale	4; 21	3; 21
2	(Costa Rica) (Peru)	Evans Medina; Guillermo Buendía	7; 21	4; 21
3	(Costa Rica) (Peru)	Isaias Benavides Retana; Sharum Durand	11; 21	9; 21
4	(Costa Rica) (Peru)	Evans Medina / Arian Morales; Sharum Durand / Diego Subauste	7; 21	7; 21
5	(Costa Rica) (Peru)	Isaias Benavides Retana / José Fabricio Cambronero; José Guevara / Adriano Viale	10; 21	10; 21

Brazil
5
Gimnasio Teodoro Palacios Flores, Court 4
13 February 2026, 12:00

Costa Rica
0

			1	2	3
1	(Brazil) (Costa Rica)	Donnians Oliveira; José Fabricio Cambronero	21; 9	21; 11
2	(Brazil) (Costa Rica)	Joaquim Mendonça; Evans Medina	21; 3	21; 5
3	(Brazil) (Costa Rica)	Welton Menezes; Isaias Benavides Retana	21; 11	21; 10
4	(Brazil) (Costa Rica)	Izak Batalha / Matheus Voigt; Evans Medina / Arian Morales	21; 4	21; 6
5	(Brazil) (Costa Rica)	Fabricio Farias / Davi Silva; Isaias Benavides Retana / José Fabricio Cambronero	21; 5	21; 12

==== Group C ====
Pos	Team	Pld	W	L	MF	MA	MD	GF	GA	GD	PF	PA	PD	Pts	Qualification
1	Guatemala (H)	3	3	0	13	2	+11	26	5	+21	637	305	+332	3	Quarter-finals
2	Mexico	3	2	1	12	3	+9	25	6	+19	607	359	+248	2	Quarter-finals
3	Colombia	3	1	2	5	10	−5	10	20	−10	405	462	−57	1	7th–10th place
4	Honduras	3	0	3	0	15	−15	0	30	−30	107	630	−523	0	7th–10th place

Source: Badminton World Federation
(H) Host

Guatemala
5
Gimnasio Teodoro Palacios Flores, Court 3
12 February 2026, 12:00

Colombia
0

			1	2	3
1	(Guatemala) (Colombia)	Kevin Cordón; Jeronimo Giraldo	21; 14	21; 6
2	(Guatemala) (Colombia)	Ramiro Espinoza; Enrique Rodríguez	21; 6	21; 7
3	(Guatemala) (Colombia)	Daniel Ochoa; Juan Martínez	21; 5	21; 5
4	(Guatemala) (Colombia)	Christopher Martínez / Jonathan Solís; Jeronimo Giraldo / Enrique Rodríguez	21; 12	21; 16
5	(Guatemala) (Colombia)	Yeison del Cid / Daniel Ochoa; Juan Martínez / Juan Felipe Moreno	21; 8	21; 9

Mexico
5
Gimnasio Teodoro Palacios Flores, Court 4
12 February 2026, 12:00

Honduras
0

			1	2	3
1	(Mexico) (Honduras)	Job Castillo; Carlos Ramírez	21; 2	21; 6
2	(Mexico) (Honduras)	Luis Montoya; Harold Banegas	21; 2	21; 2
3	(Mexico) (Honduras)	Armando Gaitán; Alejandro Alvarado Ávila	21; 2	21; 4
4	(Mexico) (Honduras)	Juan Pablo Montoya / Juan Torres; Alejandro Alvarado Ávila / Carlos Ramírez	21; 4	21; 6
5	(Mexico) (Honduras)	Job Castillo / Armando Gaitán; Aaron Cerrato Chinchilla / Carlos Ortiz Siu	21; 2	21; 5

Mexico
5
Gimnasio Teodoro Palacios Flores, Court 2
12 February 2026, 18:00

Colombia
0

			1	2	3
1	(Mexico) (Colombia)	Job Castillo; Jeronimo Giraldo	21; 16	21; 11
2	(Mexico) (Colombia)	Luis Montoya; Enrique Rodríguez	21; 13	21; 9
3	(Mexico) (Colombia)	Armando Gaitán; Juan Felipe Moreno	21; 6	21; 9
4	(Mexico) (Colombia)	Juan Pablo Montoya / Juan Torres; Jeronimo Giraldo / Enrique Rodríguez	21; 8	21; 13
5	(Mexico) (Colombia)	Job Castillo / Luis Montoya; Juan Martínez / Juan Felipe Moreno	21; 11	21; 11

Guatemala
5
Gimnasio Teodoro Palacios Flores, Court 4
12 February 2026, 18:00

Honduras
0

			1	2	3
1	(Guatemala) (Honduras)	Yeison del Cid; Carlos Ramírez	21; 4	21; 3
2	(Guatemala) (Honduras)	Ramiro Espinoza; Alejandro Alvarado Ávila	21; 2	21; 1
3	(Guatemala) (Honduras)	Daniel Ochoa; Carlos Ortiz Siu	21; 4	21; 3
4	(Guatemala) (Honduras)	Christopher Martínez / Jonathan Solís; Alejandro Alvarado Ávila / Carlos Ramírez	21; 2	21; 5
5	(Guatemala) (Honduras)	Ramiro Espinoza / Daniel Ochoa; Harold Banegas / Aaron Cerrato Chinchilla	21; 4	21; 2

Mexico
2
Gimnasio Teodoro Palacios Flores, Court 1
13 February 2026, 12:00

Guatemala
3

			1	2	3
1	(Mexico) (Guatemala)	Armando Gaitán; Kevin Cordón	14; 21	14; 21
2	(Mexico) (Guatemala)	Juan Torres; Yeison del Cid	21; 18	18; 21	11; 21
3	(Mexico) (Guatemala)	Juan Pablo Montoya; Daniel Ochoa	14; 21	11; 21
4	(Mexico) (Guatemala)	Job Castillo / Armando Gaitán; Yeison del Cid / Christopher Martínez	21; 17	21; 19
5	(Mexico) (Guatemala)	Juan Pablo Montoya / Juan Torres; Daniel Ochoa / Jonathan Solís	21; 19	21; 18

Colombia
5
Gimnasio Teodoro Palacios Flores, Court 3
13 February 2026, 12:00

Honduras
0

			1	2	3
1	(Colombia) (Honduras)	Jeronimo Giraldo; Carlos Ramírez	21; 3	21; 6
2	(Colombia) (Honduras)	Juan Felipe Moreno; Alejandro Alvarado Ávila	21; 3	21; 4
3	(Colombia) (Honduras)	Juan Martínez; Carlos Ortiz Siu	21; 2	21; 5
4	(Colombia) (Honduras)	Jeronimo Giraldo / Enrique Rodríguez; Alejandro Alvarado Ávila / Carlos Ramírez	21; 5	21; 5
5	(Colombia) (Honduras)	Juan Martínez / Juan Felipe Moreno; Harold Banegas / Aaron Cerrato Chinchilla	21; 5	21; 4

=== Classification round ===
==== Bracket ====
Semi-finals
13 February
El Salvador	3
Honduras	0
13 February
Colombia	3
Costa Rica	0

Final
14 February
El Salvador	3
Colombia	0
Third place
14 February
Honduras	0
Costa Rica	3

==== 7th to 10th place ====
El Salvador
3
Gimnasio Teodoro Palacios Flores, Court 3
13 February 2026, 18:00

Honduras
0

			1	2	3
1	(El Salvador) (Honduras)	Javier Alas; Carlos Ramírez	21; 3	21; 5
2	(El Salvador) (Honduras)	Manuel Mejía; Harold Banegas	21; 4	21; 6
3	(El Salvador) (Honduras)	Melvin Calzadilla; Alejandro Alvarado Ávila	21; 10	21; 5
4	(El Salvador) (Honduras)	Uriel Canjura / Manuel Mejía; Aaron Cerrato Chinchilla / Carlos Ortiz Siu				not played
5	(El Salvador) (Honduras)	Javier Alas / Melvin Calzadilla; Alejandro Alvarado Ávila / Carlos Ramírez				not played

Colombia
3
Gimnasio Teodoro Palacios Flores, Court 4
13 February 2026, 18:00

Costa Rica
0

			1	2	3
1	(Colombia) (Costa Rica)	Jeronimo Giraldo; José Fabricio Cambronero	21; 14	21; 13
2	(Colombia) (Costa Rica)	Juan Felipe Moreno; Isaias Benavides Retana	21; 14	21; 19
3	(Colombia) (Costa Rica)	Juan Martínez; Arian Morales	21; 10	21; 14
4	(Colombia) (Costa Rica)	Jeronimo Giraldo / Enrique Rodríguez; Isaias Benavides Retana / José Fabricio Cambronero				not played
5	(Colombia) (Costa Rica)	Juan Martínez / Juan Felipe Moreno; Evans Medina / Arian Morales				not played

==== 9th place ====
Honduras
0
Gimnasio Teodoro Palacios Flores, Court 4
14 February 2026, 15:00

Costa Rica
3

			1	2	3
1	(Honduras) (Costa Rica)	Carlos Ramírez; Evans Medina	14; 21	15; 21
2	(Honduras) (Costa Rica)	Harold Banegas; Isaias Benavides Retana	6; 21	6; 21
3	(Honduras) (Costa Rica)	Alejandro Alvarado Ávila; Arian Morales	14; 21	9; 21
4	(Honduras) (Costa Rica)	Aaron Cerrato Chinchilla / Carlos Ortiz Siu; Isaias Benavides Retana / Arian Morales				not played
5	(Honduras) (Costa Rica)	Alejandro Alvarado Ávila / Carlos Ramírez; José Fabricio Cambronero / Evans Medina				not played

==== 7th place ====
El Salvador
3
Gimnasio Teodoro Palacios Flores, Court 2
14 February 2026, 15:00

Colombia
0

			1	2	3
1	(El Salvador) (Colombia)	Uriel Canjura; Jeronimo Giraldo	21; 7	21; 14
2	(El Salvador) (Colombia)	Javier Alas; Juan Martínez	21; 9	21; 6
3	(El Salvador) (Colombia)	Manuel Mejía; Enrique Rodríguez	21; 9	20; 22	21; 13
4	(El Salvador) (Colombia)	Javier Alas / Melvin Calzadilla; Jeronimo Giraldo / Enrique Rodríguez				not played
5	(El Salvador) (Colombia)	Uriel Canjura / Manuel Mejía; Juan Martínez / Juan Felipe Moreno				not played

=== Knockout stage ===
==== Bracket ====
Quarter-finals
13 February
Canada
Bye
13 February
Mexico	3
Peru	0
13 February
United States	3
Guatemala	1
13 February
Bye
Brazil

Semi-finals
14 February
Canada	3
Mexico	0
14 February
United States	3
Brazil	1

Final
15 February
Canada	3
United States	1
Third place
14 February
Mexico	1
Brazil	3

==== Quarter-finals ====
United States
3
Gimnasio Teodoro Palacios Flores, Court 1
13 February 2026, 18:00

Guatemala
1

			1	2	3
1	(United States) (Guatemala)	Mark Alcala; Kevin Cordón	21; 19	19; 21	19; 21
2	(United States) (Guatemala)	Garret Tan; Ramiro Espinoza	21; 10	21; 17
3	(United States) (Guatemala)	Jay Chun; Daniel Ochoa	21; 12	17; 21	22; 20
4	(United States) (Guatemala)	Chen Zhi-yi / Presley Smith; Yeison del Cid / Christopher Martínez	21; 12	21; 15
5	(United States) (Guatemala)	Arden Lee / Adrian Mar; Ramiro Espinoza / Daniel Ochoa

Mexico
3
Gimnasio Teodoro Palacios Flores, Court 2
13 February 2026, 18:00

Peru
0

			1	2	3
1	(Mexico) (Peru)	Job Castillo; Adriano Viale	15; 21	21; 16	21; 14
2	(Mexico) (Peru)	Luis Montoya; Guillermo Buendía	21; 19	21; 13
3	(Mexico) (Peru)	Armando Gaitán; Sharum Durand	21; 11	21; 11
4	(Mexico) (Peru)	Juan Pablo Montoya / Juan Torres; José Guevara / Adriano Viale
5	(Mexico) (Peru)	Job Castillo / Luis Montoya; Sharum Durand / Diego Subauste

==== 5th place play-off ====
Peru
3
Gimnasio Teodoro Palacios Flores, Court 1
14 February 2026, 09:00

Guatemala
1

			1	2	3
1	(Peru) (Guatemala)	Adriano Viale; Yeison del Cid	19; 21	21; 18	11; 21
2	(Peru) (Guatemala)	Guillermo Buendía; Ramiro Espinoza	18; 21	21; 16	21; 19
3	(Peru) (Guatemala)	Sharum Durand; Daniel Ochoa	21; 15	21; 18
4	(Peru) (Guatemala)	José Guevara / Adriano Viale; Ramiro Espinoza / Jonathan Solís	21; 12	21; 13
5	(Peru) (Guatemala)	Sharum Durand / Diego Subauste; Yeison del Cid / Christopher Martínez

==== Semi-finals ====
Canada
3
Gimnasio Teodoro Palacios Flores, Court 2
14 February 2026, 12:00

Mexico
0

			1	2	3
1	(Canada) (Mexico)	Victor Lai; Luis Montoya	21; 4	21; 13
2	(Canada) (Mexico)	Brian Yang; Armando Gaitán	21; 15	18; 21	21; 9
3	(Canada) (Mexico)	Timothy Lock; Juan Torres	21; 10	23; 21
4	(Canada) (Mexico)	Daniel Leung / Nyl Yakura; Job Castillo / Luis Montoya				not played
5	(Canada) (Mexico)	Kevin Lee / Ty Alexander Lindeman; Juan Pablo Montoya / Juan Torres				not played

United States
3
Gimnasio Teodoro Palacios Flores, Court 3
14 February 2026, 12:00

Brazil
1

			1	2	3
1	(United States) (Brazil)	Mark Alcala; Jonathan Matias	24; 22	17; 21	9; 21
2	(United States) (Brazil)	Chen Zhi-yi / Presley Smith; Fabrício Farias / Davi Silva	21; 18	22; 20
3	(United States) (Brazil)	Garret Tan; Donnians Oliveira	21; 8	21; 18
4	(United States) (Brazil)	Arden Lee / Joshua Yang; Izak Batalha / Matheus Voigt	21; 11	21; 18
5	(United States) (Brazil)	Adrian Mar; Deivid Silva

==== 3rd place ====
Mexico
1
Gimnasio Teodoro Palacios Flores, Court 1
14 February 2026, 18:00

Brazil
3

			1	2	3
1	(Mexico) (Brazil)	Job Castillo; Jonathan Matias	15; 21	20; 22
2	(Mexico) (Brazil)	Luis Montoya; Donnians Oliveira	21; 18	21; 12
3	(Mexico) (Brazil)	Armando Gaitán; Deivid Silva	17; 21	14; 21
4	(Mexico) (Brazil)	Armando Gaitán / Juan Torres; Fabricio Farias / Davi Silva	16; 21	12; 21
5	(Mexico) (Brazil)	Job Castillo / Luis Montoya; Jonathan Matias / Deivid Silva				not played

==== Final ====
Canada
3
Gimnasio Teodoro Palacios Flores, Court 1
15 February 2026, 10:00

United States
1

			1	2	3
1	(Canada) (United States)	Victor Lai; Mark Alcala	21; 13	21; 12
2	(Canada) (United States)	Jonathan Lai / Ty Alexander Lindeman; Chen Zhi-yi / Presley Smith	24; 26	20; 22
3	(Canada) (United States)	Brian Yang; Garret Tan	17; 21	21; 9	21; 16
4	(Canada) (United States)	Kevin Lee / Nyl Yakura; Arden Lee / Joshua Yang	21; 8	21; 19
5	(Canada) (United States)	Joshua Nguyen; Adrian Mar

== Female Cup ==
=== Group stage ===
==== Group A ====
Pos	Team	Pld	W	L	MF	MA	MD	GF	GA	GD	PF	PA	PD	Pts	Qualification
1	Canada	2	2	0	10	0	+10	20	0	+20	421	162	+259	2	Semi-finals
2	Peru	2	1	1	5	5	0	10	10	0	314	309	+5	1	Quarter-finals
3	Colombia	2	0	2	0	10	−10	0	20	−20	156	420	−264	0	7th–9th place

Source: Badminton World Federation

Colombia
0
Gimnasio Teodoro Palacios Flores, Court 1
12 February 2026, 15:00

Peru
5

			1	2	3
1	(Colombia) (Peru)	Juliana Giraldo; Inés Castillo	14; 21	5; 21
2	(Colombia) (Peru)	Natalia Ochoa; Namie Miyahira	9; 21	9; 21
3	(Colombia) (Peru)	Juliana Castaño; Naomi Junco	4; 21	9; 21
4	(Colombia) (Peru)	Hanna Escallon / Juliana Giraldo; Fernanda Munar / Rafaela Munar	12; 21	13; 21
5	(Colombia) (Peru)	Juliana Castaño / Natalia Ochoa; Naomi Junco / Namie Miyahira	15; 21	8; 21

Canada
5
Gimnasio Teodoro Palacios Flores, Court 2
12 February 2026, 09:00

Peru
0

			1	2	3
1	(Canada) (Peru)	Michelle Li; Inés Castillo	22; 20	21; 6
2	(Canada) (Peru)	Wen Yu Zhang; Namie Miyahira	21; 12	21; 4
3	(Canada) (Peru)	Rachel Chan; Naomi Junco	21; 15	21; 5
4	(Canada) (Peru)	Jackie Dent / Crystal Lai; Fernanda Munar / Rafaela Munar	21; 8	21; 6
5	(Canada) (Peru)	Catherine Choi / Josephine Wu; Naomi Junco / Namie Miyahira	21; 17	21; 11

Canada
5
Gimnasio Teodoro Palacios Flores, Court 2
13 February 2026, 09:00

Colombia
0

			1	2	3
1	(Canada) (Colombia)	Michelle Li; Juliana Giraldo	21; 9	21; 7
2	(Canada) (Colombia)	Rachel Chan; Natalia Ochoa	21; 2	21; 5
3	(Canada) (Colombia)	Chloe Hoang; Juliana Castaño	21; 6	21; 7
4	(Canada) (Colombia)	Jackie Dent / Crystal Lai; Hanna Escallon / Juliana Giraldo	21; 5	21; 6
5	(Canada) (Colombia)	Eliana Zhang / Wen Yu Zhang; Juliana Castaño / Natalia Ochoa	21; 4	21; 7

==== Group B ====
Pos	Team	Pld	W	L	MF	MA	MD	GF	GA	GD	PF	PA	PD	Pts	Qualification
1	United States	2	2	0	10	0	+10	20	0	+20	420	91	+329	2	Semi-finals
2	El Salvador	2	1	1	5	5	0	10	10	0	274	230	+44	1	Quarter-finals
3	Honduras	2	0	2	0	10	−10	0	20	−20	47	420	−373	0	7th–9th place

Source: Badminton World Federation

United States
5
Gimnasio Teodoro Palacios Flores, Court 3
12 February 2026, 09:00

El Salvador
0

			1	2	3
1	(United States) (El Salvador)	Beiwen Zhang; Margareth Revelo	21; 9	21; 9
2	(United States) (El Salvador)	Ella Lin; Fátima Centeno	21; 5	21; 3
3	(United States) (El Salvador)	Audrey Chang; Gabriela Barrios	21; 10	21; 4
4	(United States) (El Salvador)	Koyu Chou / Micah Henares Cruz; Fátima Centeno / Daniela Hernández	21; 9	21; 8
5	(United States) (El Salvador)	Francesca Corbett / Jennie Gai; Gabriela Barrios / Margareth Revelo	21; 3	21; 4

Honduras
0
Gimnasio Teodoro Palacios Flores, Court 3
12 February 2026, 15:00

El Salvador
5

			1	2	3
1	(Honduras) (El Salvador)	Vanessa Ortiz Siu; Margareth Revelo	2; 21	1; 21
2	(Honduras) (El Salvador)	Valeria Alvarado Ávila; Fátima Centeno	1; 21	5; 21
3	(Honduras) (El Salvador)	Valeria Vásquez Aguilar; Daniela Hernández	3; 21	3; 21
4	(Honduras) (El Salvador)	Vanessa Ortiz Siu / Helen Soto Mejía; Gabriela Barrios / Margareth Revelo	0; 21	2; 21
5	(Honduras) (El Salvador)	Valeria Alvarado Ávila / Valeria Vásquez Aguilar; Fátima Centeno / Daniela Hernández	1; 21	2; 21

United States
5
Gimnasio Teodoro Palacios Flores, Court 3
13 February 2026, 09:00

Honduras
0

			1	2	3
1	(United States) (Honduras)	Micah Henares Cruz; Vanessa Ortiz Siu	21; 7	21; 2
2	(United States) (Honduras)	Audrey Chang; Valeria Alvarado Ávila	21; 1	21; 2
3	(United States) (Honduras)	Sophia Wu; Valeria Vásquez Aguilar	21; 3	21; 5
4	(United States) (Honduras)	Lauren Lam / Allison Lee; Vanessa Ortiz Siu / Helen Soto Mejía	21; 2	21; 1
5	(United States) (Honduras)	Koyu Chou / Ella Lin; Valeria Alvarado Ávila / Valeria Vásquez Aguilar	21; 2	21; 2

==== Group C ====
Pos	Team	Pld	W	L	MF	MA	MD	GF	GA	GD	PF	PA	PD	Pts	Qualification
1	Brazil	2	2	0	10	0	+10	20	2	+18	453	290	+163	2	Quarter-finals
2	Mexico	2	1	1	5	5	0	11	10	+1	381	385	−4	1	Quarter-finals
3	Guatemala	2	0	2	0	10	−10	1	20	−19	282	441	−159	0	7th–9th place

Source: Badminton World Federation

Brazil
5
Gimnasio Teodoro Palacios Flores, Court 1
12 February 2026, 09:00

Guatemala
0

			1	2	3
1	(Brazil) (Guatemala)	Juliana Viana Vieira; Nikté Sotomayor	21; 13	21; 12
2	(Brazil) (Guatemala)	Jeisiane Alves; Luisa Santizo Alfaro	21; 10	21; 7
3	(Brazil) (Guatemala)	Sâmia Lima; Fatima Gutiérrez	19; 21	21; 10	21; 9
4	(Brazil) (Guatemala)	Jaqueline Lima / Sâmia Lima; Diana Corleto / Nikté Sotomayor	21; 14	21; 15
5	(Brazil) (Guatemala)	Sânia Lima / Juliana Viana Vieira; Fatima Gutiérrez / Luisa Santizo Alfaro	21; 6	21; 4

Mexico
5
Gimnasio Teodoro Palacios Flores, Court 2
12 February 2026, 15:00

Guatemala
0

			1	2	3
1	(Mexico) (Guatemala)	Vanessa García; Nikté Sotomayor	22; 20	21; 13
2	(Mexico) (Guatemala)	Cecilia Madera; Luisa Santizo Alfaro	21; 13	21; 16
3	(Mexico) (Guatemala)	Vanessa Villalobos; Fatima Gutiérrez	21; 16	21; 11
4	(Mexico) (Guatemala)	Romina Fregoso / Miriam Jacqueline Rodríguez; Diana Corleto / Nikté Sotomayor	21; 17	22; 20
5	(Mexico) (Guatemala)	Mayte Macías Marín / Vanessa Villalobos; Fatima Gutiérrez / Luisa Santizo Alfaro	21; 18	21; 17

Brazil
5
Gimnasio Teodoro Palacios Flores, Court 1
13 February 2026, 09:00

Mexico
0

			1	2	3
1	(Brazil) (Mexico)	Juliana Viana Vieira; Vanessa García	21; 12	21; 12
2	(Brazil) (Mexico)	Jeisiane Alves; Vanessa Villalobos	21; 15	21; 16
3	(Brazil) (Mexico)	Sâmia Lima; Mayte Macías Marín	21; 17	21; 15
4	(Brazil) (Mexico)	Jaqueline Lima / Sâmia Lima; Romina Fregoso / Miriam Jacqueline Rodríguez	14; 21	21; 14	21; 17
5	(Brazil) (Mexico)	Sânia Lima / Juliana Viana Vieira; Mayté Macias Marin / Cecilia Madera	21; 16	21; 14

=== Classification round ===
==== Bracket ====
Semi-finals
13 February
Colombia
Bye
13 February
Guatemala	3
Honduras	0

Final
14 February
Colombia	1
Guatemala	3

==== 7th to 9th place ====
Guatemala
3
Gimnasio Teodoro Palacios Flores, Court 3
13 February 2026, 15:00

Honduras
0

			1	2	3
1	(Guatemala) (Honduras)	Nikté Sotomayor; Vanessa Ortiz Siu	21; 1	21; 3
2	(Guatemala) (Honduras)	Luisa Santizo Alfaro; Valeria Alvarado Ávila	21; 3	21; 3
3	(Guatemala) (Honduras)	Fatima Gutiérrez; Helen Soto Mejía	21; 3	21; 2
4	(Guatemala) (Honduras)	Diana Corleto / Nikté Sotomayor; Vanessa Ortiz Siu / Helen Aruba Soto Mejía				not played
5	(Guatemala) (Honduras)	Fatima Gutiérrez / Luisa Santizo Alfaro; Valeria Alvarado Ávila / Valeria Vásquez Aguilar				not played

==== 7th place ====
Colombia
1
Gimnasio Teodoro Palacios Flores, Court 1
14 February 2026, 15:00

Guatemala
3

			1	2	3
1	(Colombia) (Guatemala)	Juliana Giraldo; Nikté Sotomayor	21; 18	21; 10
2	(Colombia) (Guatemala)	Natalia Ochoa; Luisa Santizo Alfaro	21; 23	17; 21
3	(Colombia) (Guatemala)	Juliana Castaño; Fatima Gutiérrez	19; 21	10; 21
4	(Colombia) (Guatemala)	Hanna Escallon / Juliana Giraldo; Diana Corleto / Nikté Sotomayor	19; 21	7; 21
5	(Colombia) (Guatemala)	Juliana Castaño / Natalia Ochoa; Fatima Gutiérrez / Luisa Santizo Alfaro				not played

=== Knockout stage ===
==== Bracket ====
Quarter-finals
13 February
Canada
Bye
13 February
Mexico	3
El Salvador	0
13 February
Peru	0
Brazil	3
13 February
Bye
United States

Semi-finals
14 February
Canada	3
Mexico	0
14 February
Brazil	0
United States	3

Final
15 February
Canada	3
United States	2
Third place
14 February
Mexico	0
Brazil	3

==== Quarter-finals ====
Peru
0
Gimnasio Teodoro Palacios Flores, Court 1
13 February 2026, 15:00

Brazil
3

			1	2	3
1	(Peru) (Brazil)	Inés Castillo; Juliana Viana Vieira	14; 21	14; 21
2	(Peru) (Brazil)	Namie Miyahira; Jeisiane Alves	12; 21	13; 21
3	(Peru) (Brazil)	Naomi Junco; Sâmia Lima	16; 21	17; 21
4	(Peru) (Brazil)	Inés Castillo / Namie Miyahira; Sânia Lima / Juliana Viana Vieira				not played
5	(Peru) (Brazil)	Fernanda Munar / Rafaela Munar; Jaqueline Lima / Sâmia Lima				not played

Mexico
3
Gimnasio Teodoro Palacios Flores, Court 2
13 February 2026, 15:00

El Salvador
0

			1	2	3
1	(Mexico) (El Salvador)	Vanessa García; Margareth Revelo	21; 7	21; 5
2	(Mexico) (El Salvador)	Cecilia Madera; Fátima Centeno	22; 20	21; 13
3	(Mexico) (El Salvador)	Mayte Macías Marín; Gabriela Barrios	21; 15	21; 18
4	(Mexico) (El Salvador)	Romina Fregoso / Miriam Jacqueline Rodríguez; Gabriela Barrios / Margareth Revelo				not played
5	(Mexico) (El Salvador)	Mayte Macías Marín / Vanessa Villalobos; Fátima Centeno / Daniela Hernández				not played

==== 5th place play-off ====
El Salvador
0
Gimnasio Teodoro Palacios Flores, Court 2
14 February 2026, 09:00

Peru
3

			1	2	3
1	(El Salvador) (Peru)	Fátima Centeno; Inés Castillo	11; 21	15; 21
2	(El Salvador) (Peru)	Gabriela Barrios; Namie Miyahira	14; 21	12; 21
3	(El Salvador) (Peru)	Daniela Hernández; Naomi Junco	10; 21	8; 21
4	(El Salvador) (Peru)	Gabriela Barrios / Margareth Revelo; Fernanda Munar / Rafaela Munar				not played
5	(El Salvador) (Peru)	Fátima Centeno / Daniela Hernández; Rafaela Castañeda / Namie Miyahira				not played

==== Semi-finals ====
Canada
3
Gimnasio Teodoro Palacios Flores, Court 4
14 February 2026, 12:00

Mexico
0

			1	2	3
1	(Canada) (Mexico)	Michelle Li; Vanessa García	21; 17	21; 18
2	(Canada) (Mexico)	Wen Yu Zhang; Cecilia Madera	21; 8	21; 6
3	(Canada) (Mexico)	Rachel Chan; Mayte Macías Marín	21; 5	21; 3
4	(Canada) (Mexico)	Catherine Choi / Chloe Hoang; Romina Fregoso / Miriam Jacqueline Rodríguez				not played
5	(Canada) (Mexico)	Josephine Wu / Eliana Zhang; Mayte Macías Marín / Vanessa Villalobos				not played

Brazil
0
Gimnasio Teodoro Palacios Flores, Court 1
14 February 2026, 12:00

United States
3

			1	2	3
1	(Brazil) (United States)	Ana Júlia Ywata; Beiwen Zhang	8; 21	7; 21
2	(Brazil) (United States)	Jaqueline Lima / Sâmia Lima; Lauren Lam / Allison Lee	14; 21	19; 21
3	(Brazil) (United States)	Juliana Akemi Murosaki; Ella Lin	7; 21	11; 21
4	(Brazil) (United States)	Sânia Lima / Tamires Santos; Francesca Corbett / Jennie Gai				not played
5	(Brazil) (United States)	Yasmin Nascimento; Audrey Chang				not played

==== 3rd place ====
Mexico
0
Gimnasio Teodoro Palacios Flores, Court 2
14 February 2026, 18:00

Brazil
3

			1	2	3
1	(Mexico) (Brazil)	Vanessa García; Juliana Viana Vieira	10; 21	5; 21
2	(Mexico) (Brazil)	Mayte Macías Marín; Jeisiane Alves	23; 25	29; 27	11; 21
3	(Mexico) (Brazil)	Vanessa Villalobos; Sâmia Lima	21; 15	13; 21	15; 21
4	(Mexico) (Brazil)	Romina Fregoso / Miriam Jacqueline Rodríguez; Jaqueline Lima / Sâmia Lima				not played
5	(Mexico) (Brazil)	Mayte Macías Marín / Vanessa Villalobos; Sânia Lima / Juliana Viana Vieira				not played

==== Final ====
Canada
3
Gimnasio Teodoro Palacios Flores, Court 2
15 February 2026, 10:00

United States
2

			1	2	3
1	(Canada) (United States)	Michelle Li; Beiwen Zhang	14; 21	21; 19	21; 19
2	(Canada) (United States)	Crystal Lai / Eliana Zhang; Lauren Lam / Allison Lee	19; 21	11; 21
3	(Canada) (United States)	Wen Yu Zhang; Ella Lin	17; 21	21; 13	21; 19
4	(Canada) (United States)	Jackie Dent / Josephine Wu; Francesca Corbett / Jennie Gai	16; 21	10; 21
5	(Canada) (United States)	Rachel Chan; Audrey Chang	21; 13	21; 10
