= 2015 BWF World Junior Championships – Teams event =

2015 BWF World Junior Championships
Tournament details
- Dates: 4–8 November 2015
- Edition: 17th
- Level: International
- Nations: 39
- Venue: Centro de Alto Rendimiento de La Videna
- Location: Lima, Peru

The Teams event of the tournament 2015 BWF World Junior Championships is held on November 4–8. The defending champions were China, who defeated Indonesia in the previous edition.

China won the cup after defeating Indonesia 3–0 in the final.

== Group stage ==
=== Group A ===
==== Group A1 ====
Pos	Team	Pld	W	L	MW	ML	GW	GL	PW	PL	Pts	Qualification
1	China [1]	4	4	0	20	0	40	0	840	352	8	Play-off A1
2	Canada [9/16]	4	3	1	12	8	25	18	758	709	6	Play-off A2
3	Turkey	4	2	2	10	10	21	22	710	767	4	Play-off A3
4	Mexico	4	1	3	6	14	16	32	733	929	2	Play-off A4
5	Italy	4	0	4	2	18	7	37	618	902	0	Final Stage 33rd to 36th

==== Group A2 ====
Pos	Team	Pld	W	L	MW	ML	GW	GL	PW	PL	Pts	Qualification
1	Malaysia [5/8]	3	3	0	12	3	26	8	692	435	6	Play-off A1
2	India [9/16]	3	2	1	10	5	23	10	636	507	4	Play-off A2
3	United States	3	1	2	8	7	16	18	598	581	2	Play-off A3
4	El Salvador	3	0	3	0	15	1	30	242	645	0	Play-off A4
5	Zambia	0	0	0	0	0	0	0	0	0	0	Withdrew

==== Group A play-offs ====
Play-off A1
1	China	3
5/8	Malaysia	0

Play-off A2
9/16	Canada	1
9/16	India	3

Play-off A3
Turkey	1
United States	3

Play-off A4
Mexico	3
El Salvador	0

=== Group B ===
==== Group B1 ====
Pos	Team	Pld	W	L	MW	ML	GW	GL	PW	PL	Pts	Qualification
1	Japan [3/4]	4	4	0	20	0	40	0	840	323	8	Play-off B1
2	Netherlands [9/16]	4	3	1	14	6	28	16	784	722	6	Play-off B2
3	Guatemala	4	2	2	7	13	16	31	738	904	4	Play-off B3
4	Dominican Republic	4	1	3	5	15	14	30	651	840	2	Play-off B4
5	Macau	4	0	4	4	16	12	33	684	908	0	Play-off B5

==== Group B2 ====
Pos	Team	Pld	W	L	MW	ML	GW	GL	PW	PL	Pts	Qualification
1	Hong Kong [5/8]	4	4	0	20	0	40	4	903	505	8	Play-off B1
2	Germany [9/16]	4	3	1	13	7	29	16	839	728	6	Play-off B2
3	France	4	2	2	10	10	24	21	816	676	4	Play-off B3
4	Hungary	4	1	3	7	13	14	26	597	672	2	Play-off B4
5	Colombia	4	0	4	0	20	0	40	266	840	0	Play-off B5

==== Group B play-offs ====
Play-off B1
3/4	Japan	3
5/8	Hong Kong	0

Play-off B2
9/16	Netherlands	2
9/16	Germany	3

Play-off B3
Guatemala	0
France	3

Play-off B4
Dominican Republic	0
Hungary	3

Play-off B5
Macau	3
Colombia	0

=== Group C ===
==== Group C1 ====
Pos	Team	Pld	W	L	MW	ML	GW	GL	PW	PL	Pts	Qualification
1	Indonesia [3/4]	4	4	0	19	1	34	3	771	381	8	Play-off C1
2	Singapore [9/16]	4	3	1	16	4	29	8	725	442	6	Play-off C2
3	Peru	4	2	2	10	10	16	20	564	559	4	Play-off C3
4	Chile	4	1	3	3	17	4	34	320	763	2	Play-off C4
5	Guyana	4	0	4	2	18	4	22	289	524	0	Play-off C5

==== Group C2 ====
Pos	Team	Pld	W	L	MW	ML	GW	GL	PW	PL	Pts	Qualification
1	Thailand [5/8]	4	4	0	20	0	40	0	840	343	8	Play-off C1
2	Spain [9/16]	4	3	1	15	5	30	11	786	518	6	Play-off C2
3	Cuba	4	2	2	10	10	21	22	681	719	4	Play-off C3
4	South Africa	4	1	3	5	15	12	30	561	795	2	Play-off C4
5	Costa Rica	4	0	4	0	20	0	40	349	842	0	Play-off C5

==== Group C play-offs ====
Play-off C1
3/4	Indonesia	3
5/8	Thailand	1

Play-off C2
9/16	Singapore	3
9/16	Spain	1

Play-off C3
Peru	3
Cuba	0

Play-off C4
Chile	0
South Africa	3

Play-off C5
Guyana	1
Costa Rica	3

=== Group D ===
==== Group D1 ====
Pos	Team	Pld	W	L	MW	ML	GW	GL	PW	PL	Pts	Qualification
1	Denmark [9/16]	4	4	0	19	1	35	4	802	534	8	Play-off D1
2	South Korea [2]	4	3	1	16	4	33	10	840	561	6	Play-off D2
3	Australia	4	2	2	8	12	18	24	703	743	4	Play-off D3
4	New Zealand	4	1	3	7	13	14	26	643	734	2	Play-off D4
5	Venezuela	4	0	4	0	20	0	36	340	756	0	Play-off D5

==== Group D2 ====
Pos	Team	Pld	W	L	MW	ML	GW	GL	PW	PL	Pts	Qualification
1	Chinese Taipei [5/8]	4	4	0	18	2	37	4	844	501	8	Play-off D1
2	England [9/16]	4	3	1	13	7	29	18	871	754	6	Play-off D2
3	Sweden	4	2	2	11	9	24	23	858	830	4	Play-off D3
4	Slovenia	4	1	3	7	13	18	28	770	858	2	Play-off D4
5	Iceland	0	0	4	1	19	3	38	454	854	0	Play-off D5

==== Group D play-offs ====
Play-off D1
9/16	Denmark	0
5/8	Chinese Taipei	3

Play-off D2
2	South Korea	3
9/16	England	0

Play-off D3
Australia	1
Sweden	3

Play-off D4
New Zealand	2
Slovenia	3

Play-off D5
Venezuela	0
Iceland	3

== Final stage ==
=== 1st to 4th ===
1st to 4th semifinals
1	China	3
3/4	Japan	2
3/4	Indonesia	3
5/8	Chinese Taipei	1

Final
1	China	3
3/4	Indonesia	0
3rd place match
3/4	Japan	0
5/8	Chinese Taipei	3

=== 5th to 8th ===
5th to 8th semifinals
5/8	Malaysia	3
5/8	Hong Kong	0
5/8	Thailand	3
9/16	Denmark	1

5th–6th place match
5/8	Malaysia	3
5/8	Thailand	1
7th–8th place match
5/8	Hong Kong	2
9/16	Denmark	3

=== 9th to 12th ===
9th to 12th Semifinals
9/16	India	3
9/16	Germany	0
9/16	Singapore	1
2	South Korea	3

9th–10th place match
9/16	India	3
2	South Korea	0
11th–12th place match
9/16	Germany	2
9/16	Singapore	3

=== 13th to 16th ===
13th to 16th Semifinals
9/16	Canada	3
9/16	Netherlands	2
9/16	Spain	0
9/16	England	3

13th–14th place match
9/16	Canada	3
9/16	England	2
15th–16th place match
9/16	Netherlands	3
9/16	Spain	2

=== 17th to 20th ===
17th to 20th Semifinals
A	United States	1
B	France	3
C	Peru	0
D	Sweden	3

17th–18th place match
B	France	3
D	Sweden	0
19th–20th place
A	United States	3
C	Peru	0

=== 21st to 24th ===
21st to 24th Semifinals
A	Turkey	3
B	Guatemala	2
C	Cuba	1
D	Australia	3

21st–22nd place match
A	Turkey	3
D	Australia	0
23rd–24th place match
B	Guatemala	2
C	Cuba	3

=== 25th to 28th ===
25th to 28th Semifinals
A	Mexico	2
B	Hungary	3
C	South Africa	0
D	Slovenia	3

25th–26th place match
B	Hungary	3
D	Slovenia	0
27th–28th place match
A	Mexico	3
C	South Africa	0

=== 29th to 32nd ===
29th to 32nd Semifinals
A	El Salvador	0
B	Dominican Republic	3
C	Chile	0
D	New Zealand	3

29th–30th place match
B	Dominican Republic	0
D	New Zealand	3
31st–32nd place match
A	El Salvador	1
C	Chile	3

=== 33rd to 36th ===
33rd to 36th Semifinals
A	Italy	3
B	Macau	1
C	Costa Rica	0
D	Iceland	3

33rd–34th place match
A	Italy	1
D	Iceland	3
35th–36th place match
B	Macau	3
C	Costa Rica	0

=== 37th to 39th ===
37th to 39th Semifinals
bye
B	Colombia
C	Guyana	0
D	Venezuela	3

37th–38th place match
B	Colombia	0
D	Venezuela	3

== Final team ranking ==
1. China [1]
2. Indonesia [3/4]
3. Chinese Taipei [5/8]
4. Japan [3/4]
5. Malaysia [5/8]
6. Thailand [5/8]
7. Denmark [9/16]
8. Hong Kong [5/8]
9. India [9/16]
10. South Korea [2]
11. Singapore [9/16]
12. Germany [9/16]
13. Canada [9/16]
14. England [9/16]
15. Netherlands [9/16]
16. Spain [9/16]
17. France
18. Sweden
19. United States
20. Peru
21. Turkey
22. Australia
23. Cuba (Debut)
24. Guatemala (Debut)
25. Hungary (Debut)
26. Slovenia
27. Mexico
28. South Africa
29. New Zealand
30. Dominican Republic
31. Chile (Debut)
32. El Salvador (Debut)
33. Iceland (Debut)
34. Italy
35. Macau
36. Costa Rica (Debut)
37. Venezuela (Debut)
38. Colombia (Debut)
39. Guyana (Debut)
40. ~~Zambia~~ (Withdrew)
