= Victor Lai =

Canadian badminton player (born 2004)

Victor Lai 賴浩俊
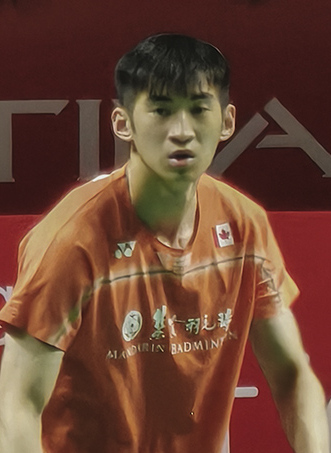
- Lai at the 2026 Indonesia Open

Personal information
- Born: 19 December 2004 (age 21) Scarborough, Ontario, Canada
- Height: 1.84 m (6 ft 0 in)

Sport
- Country: Canada
- Sport: Badminton
- Handedness: Right
- Coached by: Chau Hoi Wah

Men's singles
- Career record: 173 wins, 78 losses
- Highest ranking: 4 (10 November 2026)
- Current ranking: 4 (10 November 2026)
- BWF profile
Medal record
Men's badminton
Representing Canada
World Championships
Bronze medal – third place	2025 Paris	Men's singles
Bronze medal – third place	2026 New Delhi	Men's singles
Pan Am Championships
Gold medal – first place	2025 Lima	Men's singles
Gold medal – first place	2026 Lima	Men's singles
Pan Am Men's Team Championships
Gold medal – first place	2022 Acapulco	Men's team
Gold medal – first place	2024 São Paulo	Men's team
Gold medal – first place	2026 Guatemala City	Men's team
Pan Am Mixed Team Championships
Gold medal – first place	2025 Aguascalientes	Mixed team
Junior Pan American Games
Gold medal – first place	2025 Asunción	Boys' singles
Silver medal – second place	2025 Asunción	Mixed doubles
Pan Am Junior Championships
Silver medal – second place	2022 Santo Domingo	Boys' singles
Silver medal – second place	2022 Santo Domingo	Mixed team

Victor Lai (born 19 December 2004) is a Canadian international badminton player. At the 2025 BWF World Championships, he became the first ever player from Canada to win a medal, securing a bronze in the men's singles event and marking a major milestone for Canadian badminton.

== Personal life ==
Lai's family was originally from Hong Kong. He is currently an undergraduate student in Kinesiology at York University.

== Career ==
At the 2025 BWF World Championships, Victor Lai made history by winning the bronze medal in the men's singles, becoming the first Canadian ever to medal at the event. His run included a comeback quarter-final victory over former world champion Loh Kean Yew before narrowly losing in the semi-finals to world No. 1 Shi Yuqi.

At the 2026 India Open, Lai reached the semi-finals of the men's singles event. He defeated Chi Yu-jen in the quarter-finals in three games, 21–18, 17–21, 21–15, to advance to the final four. His run ended in the semi-finals against Lin Chun-yi, who later won the tournament. The result marked Lai's first semi-final appearance at a BWF World Tour Super 750 tournament.

In his All England debut in March 2026, Lai once again reached the semi-finals in the historical tournament, becoming the first Canadian to reach such a milestone since women's singles player Wendy Carter achieved an All England semi-finalist in 1978. In June, Lai stunned the home favourite, Jonatan Christie in the Super 1000 Indonesia Open to win his first world tour tournament.

At the 2026 BWF World Championships, Lai repeated his historic 2025 run, winning a second bronze medal after falling in the semi-finals to eventual champion Alex Lanier. His historic run continued at the Korea Open, where he won the title and became the first Canadian to win the Korea Open.

== Achievements ==
=== BWF World Championships ===
Men's singles
Year	Venue	Opponent	Score	Result	Ref.
2025	Adidas Arena; Paris, France	(China) Shi Yuqi	21–13, 20–22, 16–21	Bronze	
2026	Indira Gandhi Arena; New Delhi, India	(France) Alex Lanier	21–16, 13–21, 14–21	Bronze	

=== Pan Am Championships ===
Men's singles
Year	Venue	Opponent	Score	Result
2025	Videna Poli 2 Lima, Peru	(Canada) Joshua Nguyen	21–9, 21–18	Gold
2026	High Performance Center VIDENA; Lima, Peru	(El Salvador) Uriel Canjura	21–11, 21–9	Gold

=== Junior Pan American Games ===
Boys' singles
Year	Venue	Opponent	Score	Result
2025	SND Stadium; Asunción, Paraguay	(Brazil) Deivid Silva	21–6, 23–21	Gold

Mixed doubles
Year	Venue	Partner	Opponent	Score	Result
2025	SND Stadium; Asunción, Paraguay	(Canada) Rachel Chan	(Brazil) Davi Silva (Brazil) Juliana Viana Vieira	21–23, 21–14, 19–21	Silver

=== Pan Am Junior Championships ===
Boys' singles
Year	Venue	Opponent	Score	Result
2022	Hotel Mundo Imperial; Acapulco, Mexico	(Canada) Joshua Nguyen	13–21, 13–21	Silver

=== BWF World Tour (2 titles, 1 runner-up) ===
The BWF World Tour, which was announced on 19 March 2017 and implemented in 2018, is a series of elite badminton tournaments sanctioned by the Badminton World Federation (BWF). The BWF World Tour is divided into levels of World Tour Finals, Super 1000, Super 750, Super 500, Super 300, and the BWF Tour Super 100.

Men's singles
Year	Tournament	Level	Opponent	Score	Result	Ref.
2025	Canada Open	Super 300	(Japan) Kenta Nishimoto	13–21, 14–21	(silver) Runner-up	
2026	Indonesia Open	Super 1000	(Indonesia) Jonatan Christie	21–19, 21–8	(gold) Winner	
2026	Korea Open	Super 500	(Hong Kong) Jason Gunawan	21–11, 21–14	(gold) Winner	

=== BWF International Challenge/Series (1 title, 3 runners-up) ===
Men's singles
Year	Tournament	Opponent	Score	Result	Ref.
2021	Guatemala International	(Guatemala) Kevin Cordón	13–21, 11–21	(silver) Runner-up	
2023	Canadian International	(Canada) Brian Yang	15–21, 12–21	(silver) Runner-up	
2024	Canadian International	(Canada) Brian Yang	14–21, 8–21	(silver) Runner-up	
2025	Canadian International	(Canada) Brian Yang	21–14, 21–15	(gold) Winner	

BWF International Challenge tournament
BWF International Series tournament

=== BWF Junior International (3 titles) ===
Boys' singles
Year	Tournament	Opponent	Score	Result	Ref.
2021	Guatemala Junior International	(Guatemala) Yeison Del Cid	25–23, 21–11	(gold) Winner	
2021	Portuguese Junior International	(France) Paul Tournefier	21–13, 21–13	(gold) Winner	

Mixed doubles
Year	Tournament	Partner	Opponent	Score	Result	Ref.
2021	Guatemala Junior International	(Canada) Sophia Nong	(Guatemala) Antonio Ortiz (Guatemala) Ana González	21–18, 21–15	(gold) Winner	

BWF Junior International Series tournament
BWF Junior Future Series tournament

== Performance timeline ==
Key

W	Won	F	Finalist	SF	Semi-finalist
QF	Quarter-finalist	#R	Rounds 4, 3, 2, 1	RR	Round-robin stage
Q#	Qualification round	A	Absent	w/d	Withdrew
G	Gold	S	Silver	B	Bronze
NH	Not held	N/A	Not applicable	DNQ	Did not qualify

=== Individual competitions ===
- Senior level

Events	2025	2026	Ref
World Championships	B	B	

Tournament	BWF World Tour			Best
Tournament	2024	2025	2026	Best
Malaysia Open	A		2R	2R ('26)
India Open	A		SF	SF ('26)
All England Open	A		SF	SF ('26)
Thailand Open	A		1R	1R ('26)
Singapore Open	A		2R	2R ('26)
Indonesia Open	A		W	W ('26)
Australian Open	1R	A		2R ('24)
U.S. Open	Q1	QF	A	QF ('25)
Canada Open	Q2	F	SF	F ('25)
China Open	A		SF	SF ('26)
Taipei Open	1R	Q1	A	1R ('24)
Korea Masters	A	SF	A	SF ('25)
China Masters	A		2R	2R ('26)
Indonesia Masters Super 100	1R	SF	A	SF ('25)
Vietnam Open	1R	A		1R ('24)
Denmark Open	A		SF	SF ('26)
French Open	A	1R	1R	1R ('25, '26)
Hylo Open	A	1R	A	1R ('25)
Korea Open	A		W	W ('26)
Japan Masters	A	1R	2R	2R ('26)
Hong Kong Open	A	Q1	A	Q1 ('25)
World Tour Finals	DNQ		Q	('26)
Year-end ranking	101	22		6
Tournament	2024	2025	2026	Best
