= Allison Lee (badminton) =

American badminton player (born 2005)

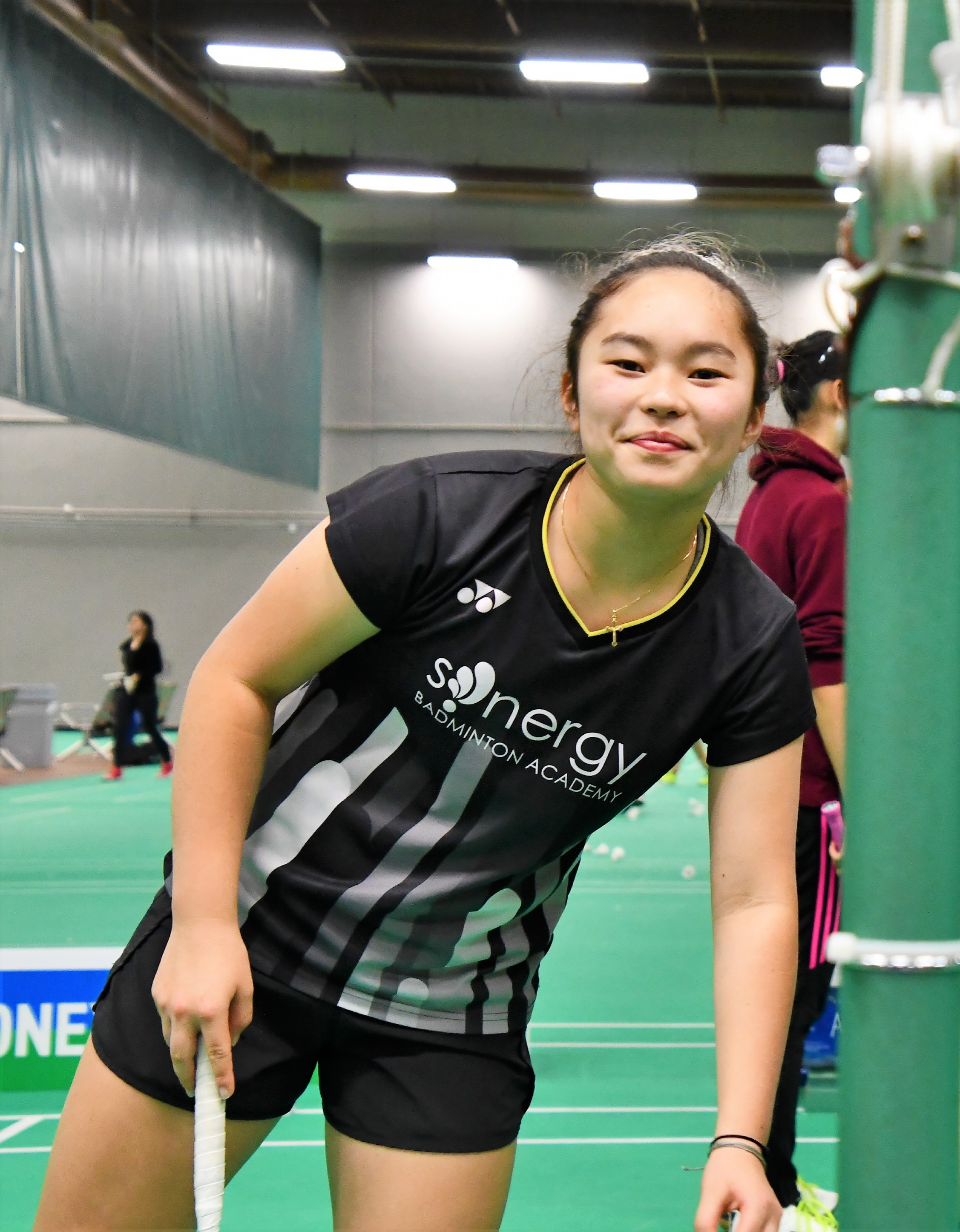
- Lee in 2019

Personal information
- Born: Allison Quỳnh Lee; March 24, 2005 (age 21) Fremont, California, United States
- Height: 1.60 m (5 ft 3 in)

Sport
- Country: United States
- Sport: Badminton
- Handedness: Right

Women's & mixed doubles
- Highest ranking: 14 (WD with Lauren Lam, November 10, 2026); 25 (WD with Francesca Corbett, March 4, 2025); 34 (XD with Presley Smith, June 10, 2024)
- Current ranking: 14 (WD with Lauren Lam, November 10, 2026)
- BWF profile
Medal record
Women's badminton
Representing United States
Pan American Championships
| Gold medal – first place | 2024 Guatemala City | Women's doubles |
| Gold medal – first place | 2024 Guatemala City | Mixed doubles |
| Gold medal – first place | 2025 Lima | Women's doubles |
| Gold medal – first place | 2026 Lima | Women's doubles |
| Silver medal – second place | 2021 Guatemala City | Women's doubles |
| Silver medal – second place | 2023 Kingston | Women's doubles |
| Bronze medal – third place | 2022 San Salvador | Women's doubles |
Pan Am Mixed Team Championships
| Silver medal – second place | 2025 Aguascalientes | Mixed team |
Pan Am Female Cup
| Gold medal – first place | 2022 Acapulco | Women's team |
| Silver medal – second place | 2020 Salvador | Women's team |
| Silver medal – second place | 2024 São Paulo | Women's team |
| Silver medal – second place | 2026 Guatemala City | Women's team |
World Junior Championships
| Silver medal – second place | 2023 Spokane | Women's doubles |
Pan Am Junior Championships
| Gold medal – first place | 2021 Acapulco | Women's doubles |
| Gold medal – first place | 2021 Acapulco | Mixed doubles |
| Gold medal – first place | 2021 Acapulco | Mixed team |

Allison Quýnh Lee (born 24 March 2005) is an American badminton player.

== Career ==
Lee was born in Fremont, California to Asian American parents in 2005. Her father is Benny Lee, a former Olympian and Pan American champion. She graduated from Gunn High School in Palo Alto, California. In 2023, she and Francesca Corbett made history by becoming the first American players to win the silver medal at the World Junior Championships. She also became Pan American champion in both Women's and Mixed doubles (with Presley Smith) in 2024. Currently, Lee is attending Santa Clara University and enrolled in its Leavey School of Business.

== Achievements ==
=== Pan Am Championships ===
Women's doubles
| Year | Venue | Partner | Opponent | Score | Result |
|---|---|---|---|---|---|
| 2021 | Sagrado Corazon de Jesus; Guatemala City, Guatemala | (United States) Francesca Corbett | (Canada) Rachel Honderich (Canada) Kristen Tsai | 12–21, 7–21 | Silver |
| 2022 | Palacio de los Deportes Carlos "El Famoso" Hernández; San Salvador, El Salvador | (United States) Francesca Corbett | (Canada) Catherine Choi (Canada) Josephine Wu | 18–21, 13–21 | Bronze |
| 2023 | G.C. Foster College of Physical Education and Sport; Kingston, Jamaica | (United States) Francesca Corbett | (Canada) Catherine Choi (Canada) Josephine Wu | 14–21, 18–21 | Silver |
| 2024 | Teodoro Palacios Flores Gymnasium; Guatemala City, Guatemala | (United States) Francesca Corbett | (United States) Annie Xu (United States) Kerry Xu | 21–14, 21–15 | Gold |
| 2025 | Videna Poli 2, Lima, Peru | (United States) Lauren Lam | (Canada) Jackie Dent (Canada) Crystal Lai | 21–11, 21–13 | Gold |
| 2026 | High Performance Center VIDENA, Lima, Peru | (United States) Lauren Lam | (United States) Francesca Corbett (United States) Jennie Gai | 21–18, 21–18 | Gold |

Mixed doubles
| Year | Venue | Partner | Opponent | Score | Result |
|---|---|---|---|---|---|
| 2024 | Teodoro Palacios Flores Gymnasium; Guatemala City, Guatemala | (United States) Presley Smith | (United States) Vinson Chiu (United States) Jennie Gai | 15–21, 21–15, 21–14 | Gold |

=== World Junior Championships ===
Girls' doubles
| Year | Venue | Partner | Opponent | Score | Result |
|---|---|---|---|---|---|
| 2023 | The Podium, Spokane, United States | (United States) Francesca Corbett | (Japan) Maya Taguchi (Japan) Aya Tamaki | 21–12, 13–21, 15–21 | Silver |

=== Pan Am Junior Championships ===
Girls' doubles
| Year | Venue | Partner | Opponent | Score | Result |
|---|---|---|---|---|---|
| 2021 | Hotel Mundo Imperial; Acapulco, Mexico | (United States) Francesca Corbett | (United States) Joline Siu (United States) Kalea Sheung | 21–12, 21–5 | Gold |

Mixed doubles
| Year | Venue | Partner | Opponent | Score | Result |
|---|---|---|---|---|---|
| 2021 | Hotel Mundo Imperial; Acapulco, Mexico | (United States) Joshua Yuan | (United States) Ryan Ma (United States) Chloe Ho | 21–14, 21–16 | Gold |

=== BWF International Challenge/Series (7 titles, 5 runners-up) ===
Women's doubles
| Year | Tournament | Partner | Opponent | Score | Result |
|---|---|---|---|---|---|
| 2021 | Guatemala International | (United States) Francesca Corbett | (Guatemala) Ana González (Guatemala) Karolina Orellana | 21–12, 21–4 | (gold) Winner |
| 2023 | Mexican International | (United States) Francesca Corbett | (Japan) Sayaka Hobara (Japan) Yui Suizu | 11–21, 21–23 | (silver) Runner-up |
| 2023 | El Salvador International | (United States) Francesca Corbett | (United States) Annie Xu (United States) Kerry Xu | 21–18, 21–11 | (gold) Winner |
| 2024 | Uganda International | (United States) Francesca Corbett | (United States) Paula Lynn Cao Hok (United States) Lauren Lam | 21–19, 18–21, 15–21 | (silver) Runner-up |
| 2025 | Uganda International | (United States) Lauren Lam | (Switzerland) Lucie Amiguet (Switzerland) Caroline Racloz | 21–10, 21–13 | (gold) Winner |
| 2025 | Polish Open | (United States) Lauren Lam | (Australia) Gronya Somerville (Australia) Angela Yu | 19–21, 21–15, 21–15 | (gold) Winner |
| 2026 | Uganda International | (United States) Lauren Lam | (India) Kavipriya Selvam (India) Simran Singhi | 21–12, 21–14 | (gold) Winner |

Mixed doubles
| Year | Tournament | Partner | Opponent | Score | Result |
|---|---|---|---|---|---|
| 2021 | Guatemala International | (United States) Joshua Yuan | (Canada) Ty Alexander Lindeman (Canada) Josephine Wu | 17–21, 8–21 | (silver) Runner-up |
| 2022 | Mexican International | (United States) Joshua Yuan | (United States) Vinson Chiu (United States) Jennie Gai | 14–21, 24–22, 21–23 | (silver) Runner-up |
| 2023 | Saipan International | (United States) Presley Smith | (Chinese Taipei) Wei Chun-wei (Chinese Taipei) Nicole Gonzales Chan | 20–22, 21–18, 21–14 | (gold) Winner |
| 2023 | El Salvador International | (United States) Presley Smith | (Brazil) Davi Silva (Brazil) Sânia Lima | 22–20, 21–18 | (gold) Winner |
| 2023 | Canadian International | (United States) Presley Smith | (Indonesia) Rian Agung Saputro (Indonesia) Serena Kani | 21–12, 8–21, 16–21 | (silver) Runner-up |

BWF International Challenge tournament
BWF International Series tournament
BWF Future Series tournament
