= Lauren Lam =

American badminton player

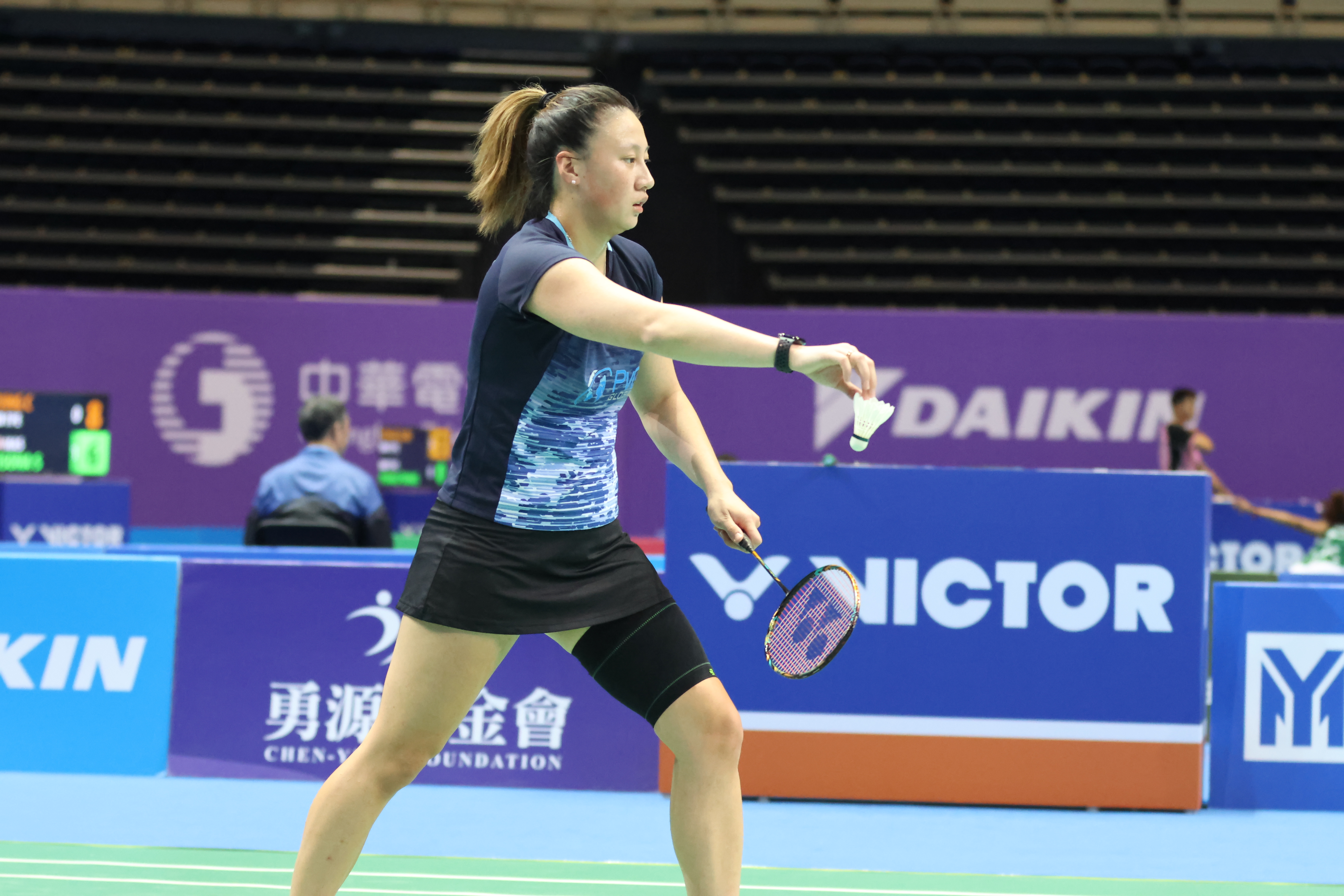
- Lauren Lam at the 2023 Kaohsiung Masters

Personal information
- Born: 15 January 2003 (age 23) United States
- Height: 1.67 m (5 ft 6 in)

Sport
- Country: United States
- Sport: Badminton
- Handedness: Left

Women's singles & doubles
- Highest ranking: 14 (WD with Allison Lee, 10 November 2026); 38 (WS, 2 May 2023)
- Current ranking: 14 (WD with Allison Lee, 10 November 2026)
- BWF profile
Medal record
Women's badminton
Representing United States
Pan American Championships
Gold medal – first place	2026 Lima	Women's doubles
Gold medal – first place	2025 Lima	Women's doubles
Bronze medal – third place	2024 Guatemala City	Women's singles
Bronze medal – third place	2023 Kingston	Women's singles
Pan Am Mixed Team Championships
Silver medal – second place	2025 Aguascalientes	Mixed team
Pan Am Female Cup
Gold medal – first place	2022 Acapulco	Women's team
Silver medal – second place	2026 Guatemala City	Women's team
Silver medal – second place	2018 Tacarigua	Women's team
Pan Am Junior Championships
Gold medal – first place	2017 Markham	Women's singles

Lauren Lam (born January 15, 2003) is a badminton player that from United States.

== Career ==
Lauren Lam consistently won medals at Pan American competitions throughout her career.

In 2017, Lam won her first gold medal at the Pan Am Junior Championships women's singles event, defeating fellow American Jennie Gai in the final.

In 2018, Lam won a silver medal in the 2018 Pan Am Badminton Championships women's team event, marking her first medal at the senior Pan American continental level.

In 2022, Lam was part of the United States team that won the gold medal at the Pan Am Female Cup, defeating Canada 3–0 in the final.

In 2023, Lam won a bronze medal in the women's singles event after losing to fellow American Beiwen Zhang in the semi-finals. Zhang went on to win the silver medal.

In 2024, Lam won a bronze medal in the women's singles event, after losing to Michelle Li in the semi-finals. Li went on to win the silver medal.

In 2025, Lam won a silver medal at the Pan Am Mixed Team Championships. She also won a gold medal in the women's doubles individual event, partnering with Allison Lee.

In 2026, Lam won a silver medal at the Pan American Badminton Championships in the women's team event. She also successfully defended her gold medal in the women's doubles individual event, again partnering with Allison Lee.

== Achievement ==
=== Pan Am Championships ===
Women's singles

Year	Venue	Opponent	Score	Result
2023	G.C. Foster College of Physical Education and Sport, Kingston, Jamaica	(United States) Beiwen Zhang	11–21, 12–21	Bronze
2024	Teodoro Palacios Flores Gymnasium, Guatemala City, Guatemala	(Canada) Michelle Li	18–21, 18–21	Bronze

Women's doubles

Year	Venue	Partner	Opponent	Score	Result
2025	Videna Poli 2, Lima, Peru	(United States) Allison Lee	(Canada) Jackie Dent (Canada) Crystal Lai	21–11, 21–13	Gold
2026	High Performance Center VIDENA, Lima, Peru	(United States) Allison Lee	(United States) Francesca Corbett (United States) Jennie Gai	21–18, 21–18	Gold

=== Pan Am Junior Championships ===
Girls' singles

Year	Venue	Opponent	Score	Result
2017	Markham Pan Am Centre, Markham, Canada	(United States) Jennie Gai	21–12, 19–21, 22–20	Gold

=== BWF International Challenge/Series & Future Series (12 titles, 6 runners-up) ===
Women's singles
Year	Tournament	Opponent	Score	Result	Ref.
2018	Yonex/K&D Graphics International Series	(Japan) Saya Yamamoto	18–21, 13–21	(silver) Runner-up	
2021	Guatemala Future Series	(United States) Ishika Jaiswal	21–11, 21–10	(gold) Winner	
2021	Bahrain International Challenge	(Indonesia) Asty Dwi Widyaningrum	21–18, 21–10	(gold) Winner	
2021	Mexican International	(United States) Jennie Gai	21–9, 21–15	(gold) Winner	
2022	Mexican International	(Israel) Ksenia Polikarpova	21–7, 21–13	(gold) Winner	
2022	El Salvador International	(Spain) Ania Setien	21–11, 21–9	(gold) Winner	
2023	Mongolia International	(Japan) Akari Kurihara	19–21, 13–21	(silver) Runner-up	
2023	Lagos International	(Peru) Inés Castillo	walkover	(silver) Runner-up	

Women's doubles
Year	Tournament	Partner	Opponent	Score	Result	Ref.
2021	Guatemala Future Series	(United States) Kodi Tang Lee	(Guatemala) Diana Corleto (Guatemala) Nikté Sotomayor	19–21, 13–21	(silver) Runner-up	
2022	Peru International	(United States) Paula Lynn Cao Hok	(United States) Annie Xu (United States) Kerry Xu	21–19, 21–18	(gold) Winner	
2022	Mexican International	(United States) Paula Lynn Cao Hok	(Canada) Catherine Choi (Canada) Josephine Wu	19–21, 10–21	(silver) Runner-up	
2022	El Salvador International	(United States) Paula Lynn Cao Hok	(United States) Annie Xu (United States) Kerry Xu	21–18, 21–17	(gold) Winner	
2023	Estonian International	(United States) Paula Lynn Cao Hok	(Sweden) Moa Sjöö (Sweden) Tilda Sjöö	21–10, 21–11	(gold) Winner	
2023	Lagos International	(United States) Paula Lynn Cao Hok	(India) Simran Singhi (India) Ritika Thaker	walkover	(silver) Runner-up	
2024	Uganda International	(United States) Paula Lynn Cao Hok	(United States) Francesca Corbett (United States) Allison Lee	19–21, 21–18, 21–15	(gold) Winner	
2025	Uganda International	(United States) Allison Lee	(Switzerland) Lucie Amiguet (Switzerland) Caroline Racloz	21–10, 21–13	(gold) Winner	
2025	Polish Open	(United States) Allison Lee	(Australia) Gronya Somerville (Australia) Angela Yu	19–21, 21–15, 21–15	(gold) Winner	
2026	Uganda International	(United States) Allison Lee	(India) Kavipriya Selvam (India) Simran Singhi	21–12, 21–14	(gold) Winner	

BWF International Challenge tournament
BWF International Series tournament
BWF Future Series tournament
