= El Salvador national badminton team =

El Salvador
- Association: Federación Salvadoreña de Bádminton (FESALBAD)
- Confederation: BPA (Pan America)
- President: Jose Bruni

BWF ranking
- Current ranking: 47 ▲4 (2 January 2024)
- Highest ranking: 47 (2 January 2024)

Pan Am Mixed Team Championships
- Appearances: 2 (first in 2023)
- Best result: 7th (2025)

The El Salvador national badminton team (Spanish: Equipo nacional de bádminton de El Salvador) represents El Salvador in international badminton team competitions. The El Salvador junior team have competed in the BWF World Junior Championships mixed team event, which is also called the Suhandinata Cup.

El Salvador won their first badminton medal at the 2022 Pan Am Badminton Championships.

== Competitive record ==
=== Pan American Team Championships ===
==== Men's team ====
Year	Result	Pos
(Barbados) 2004	Did not enter	
(Peru) 2006	Did not enter	
(Brazil) 2008	Did not enter	
(Peru) 2010	Did not enter	
(United States) 2012	Did not enter	
(Mexico) 2016	Did not enter	
(Trinidad and Tobago) 2018	Did not enter	
(Brazil) 2020	Did not enter	
(Mexico) 2022	Did not enter	
(Brazil) 2024	Group stage	7th
(Guatemala) 2026	Group stage	7th

==== Women's team ====
Year	Result	Pos
(Barbados) 2004	Did not enter	
(Peru) 2006	Did not enter	
(Brazil) 2008	Did not enter	
(Peru) 2010	Did not enter	
(United States) 2012	Did not enter	
(Mexico) 2016	Did not enter	
(Trinidad and Tobago) 2018	Did not enter	
(Brazil) 2020	Did not enter	
(Mexico) 2022	Did not enter	
(Brazil) 2024	Group stage	6th
(Guatemala) 2026	Quarter-finals	6th

==== Mixed team ====
Year	Result	Pos
(Canada) 1977	Did not enter	
(Peru) 1978	Did not enter	
(Mexico) 1979	Did not enter	
(United States) 1980	Did not enter	
(Peru) 1987	Did not enter	
(Mexico) 1989	Did not enter	
(Jamaica) 1991	Did not enter	
(Guatemala) 1993	Did not enter	
(Canada) 1997	Did not enter	
(Peru) 2001	Did not enter	
(Peru) 2004	Did not enter	
(Barbados) 2005	Did not enter	
(Canada) 2007	Did not enter	
(Peru) 2008	Did not enter	
(Mexico) 2009	Did not enter	
(Brazil) 2010	Did not enter	
(Peru) 2012	Did not enter	
(Dominican Republic) 2013	Did not enter	
(Canada) 2014	Did not enter	
(Brazil) 2016	Did not enter	
(Dominican Republic) 2017	Did not enter	
(Peru) 2019	Did not enter	
(Mexico) 2023	Group stage	9th
(Mexico) 2025	Group stage	7th

== Junior competitive record ==
=== Suhandinata Cup ===
==== Mixed team ====
Year	Result
(Peru) 2015	Group A2 - 32nd of 40
(Indonesia) 2017	Group H2 - 38th of 44

=== Pan American Junior Team Championships ===
==== Mixed team ====
Year	Round	Pos
2025	Group stage	10th
2026	Group stage	9th

== Players ==
=== Current squad ===
As of 2 January 2024

==== Men's team ====
Name	DoB/Age	Ranking of event		
Name	DoB/Age	MS	MD	XD
Uriel Canjura	12 September 2000 (age 26)	54	-	-
Manuel Mejía	20 January 1998 (age 28)	377	288	374
Kenneth Suria	3 October 2001 (age 25)	657	288	342
Javier Alas	24 March 2003 (age 23)	268	700	155
José Orellana	9 November 2000 (age 25)	888	700	946

==== Women's team ====
Name	DoB/Age	Ranking of event		
Name	DoB/Age	WS	WD	XD
Daniela Hernández	28 February 2003 (age 23)	238	101	494
Fátima Centeno	22 August 1999 (age 27)	319	101	155
Gabriela Barrios	9 March 2005 (age 21)	255	166	374
Margareth Revelo	8 March 2004 (age 22)	371	166	342
Lucero Rodríguez	3 May 2007 (age 19)	-	-	-
