= Mexico national badminton team =

National badminton team representing Mexico

Mexico
- Association: Federación Mexicana de Bádminton (FEMEBA)
- Confederation: BPA (Pan America)
- President: Francisco Orozco

BWF ranking
- Current ranking: 23 (2 April 2024)
- Highest ranking: 21 (6 October 2016)

Sudirman Cup
- Appearances: 4 (first in 1991)
- Best result: Group stage

Thomas Cup
- Appearances: 1 (first in 2016)
- Best result: Group stage

Uber Cup
- Appearances: 1 (first in 2024)
- Best result: Group stage

Pan Am Mixed Team Championships
- Appearances: 16 (first in 1979)
- Best result: Third place (1979, 1993, 2009)

Pan Am Men's Team Championships
- Appearances: 4 (first in 2016)
- Best result: Champions (2016)

Pan Am Women's Team Championships
- Appearances: 4 (first in 2016)
- Best result: Third place (2016, 2024)

The Mexico national badminton team (Spanish: Selección de bádminton de México) represents Mexico in international badminton team competitions and is controlled by the Mexican Badminton Federation. Mexico competed in the Sudirman Cup four times from 1991 until 2001.

The Mexico men's team qualified for their first Thomas Cup in 2016 after winning the 2016 Pan Am Team Badminton Championships after beating Canada in the gold medal tie with a score of 3–0. The team later debuted in the 2016 Thomas Cup. The team were eliminated in the group stages and finished in 16th place.

The Mexico women's team also achieved a podium position, finishing third place at the 2016 Pan Am Team Badminton Championships. The mixed team finished third twice in 1993 and 2009. The Mexico team also participates in the Pan American Games and has won four bronze medals in badminton at the Games.

== Competitive record ==
=== Thomas Cup ===
| Year | Round | Pos |
|---|---|---|
| 1949 | Did not enter | |
| 1952 | Did not enter | |
| 1955 | Did not enter | |
| 1958 | Did not enter | |
| 1961 | Did not enter | |
| 1964 | Did not qualify | |
| 1967 | Did not qualify | |
| 1970 | Did not qualify | |
| 1973 | Did not qualify | |
| 1976 | Did not qualify | |
| 1979 | Did not qualify | |
| 1982 | Did not qualify | |
| 1984 | Did not qualify | |
| 1986 | Did not qualify | |
| 1988 | Withdrew | |
| 1990 | Did not qualify | |
| 1992 | Did not qualify | |
| 1994 | Did not qualify | |
| 1996 | Did not enter | |
| 1998 | Did not qualify | |
| 2000 | Did not qualify | |
| 2002 | Did not qualify | |
| 2004 | Did not qualify | |
| 2006 | Did not qualify | |
| 2008 | Did not enter | |
| 2010 | Did not qualify | |
| 2012 | Did not enter | |
| 2014 | Did not enter | |
| 2016 | Group stage | 16th |
| 2018 | Did not qualify | |
| 2020 | Did not qualify | |
| 2022 | Did not qualify | |
| 2024 | Did not qualify | |
| 2026 | Did not qualify | |
| 2028 | To be determined | |
| 2030 | To be determined | |

=== Uber Cup ===
| Year | Round | Pos |
|---|---|---|
| 1957 to 1988 | Did not enter | |
| 1990 | Did not qualify | |
| 1992 | Did not qualify | |
| 1994 | Did not qualify | |
| 1996 | Did not enter | |
| 1998 | Did not qualify | |
| 2000 | Did not qualify | |
| 2002 | Did not qualify | |
| 2004 | Did not enter | |
| 2006 | Did not qualify | |
| 2008 | Did not enter | |
| 2010 | Did not qualify | |
| 2012 | Did not enter | |
| 2014 | Did not enter | |
| 2016 | Did not qualify | |
| 2018 | Did not enter | |
| 2020 | Did not qualify | |
| 2022 | Did not qualify | |
| 2024 | Group stage | 15th |
| 2026 | Did not qualify | |
| 2028 | To be determined | |
| 2030 | To be determined | |

=== Sudirman Cup ===
| Year | Round | Pos |
|---|---|---|
| 1989 | Did not enter | |
| 1991 | Group stage | 30th |
| 1993 | Did not enter | |
| 1995 | Did not enter | |
| 1997 | Group stage | 50th |
| 1999 | Group stage | 45th |
| 2001 | Group stage | 50th |
| 2003 | Did not enter | |
| 2005 | Did not enter | |
| 2007 | Did not enter | |
| 2009 | Did not enter | |
| 2011 | Did not enter | |
| 2013 | Did not enter | |
| 2015 | Did not enter | |
| 2017 | Did not enter | |
| 2019 | Did not enter | |
| 2021 | Did not enter | |
| 2023 | Did not qualify | |
| 2025 | Did not qualify | |
| 2027 | To be determined | |
| 2029 | To be determined | |

=== Pan American Team Championships ===
==== Men's team ====
| Year | Round | Pos |
|---|---|---|
| 2016 | Champions | 1st |
| 2018 | Did not enter | |
| 2020 | Runners-up | 2nd |
| 2022 | Third place | 3rd |
| 2024 | Group stage | 5th |
| 2026 | Fourth place | 4th |
| 2028 | To be determined | |
| 2030 | To be determined | |

==== Women's team ====
| Year | Round | Pos |
|---|---|---|
| 2016 | Third place | 3rd |
| 2018 | Did not enter | |
| 2020 | Fourth place | 4th |
| 2022 | Group stage | 5th |
| 2024 | Third place | 3rd |
| 2026 | Fourth place | 4th |
| 2028 | To be determined | |
| 2030 | To be determined | |

==== Mixed team ====
| Year | Round | Pos |
|---|---|---|
| 1977 | Did not enter | |
| 1978 | Did not enter | |
| 1979 | Semi-finals (Note: With only three teams competing in the mixed team championships, no bronze medal was awarded for third place.) | 3rd |
| 1980 | Did not enter | |
| 1987 | Did not enter | |
| 1989 | Group stage | 5th |
| 1991 | Fourth place | 4th |
| 1993 | Third place | 3rd |
| 1997 | Fourth place | 4th |
| 2001 | Did not enter | |
| 2004 | Did not enter | |
| 2005 | Did not enter | |
| 2007 | Fourth place | 4th |
| 2008 | Fourth place | 4th |
| 2009 | Third place | 3rd |
| 2010 | Fourth place | 4th |
| 2012 | Fourth place | 4th |
| 2013 | Group stage | 5th |
| 2014 | Group stage | 6th |
| 2016 | Did not enter | |
| 2017 | Group stage | 6th |
| 2019 | Group stage | 5th |
| 2023 | Fourth place | 4th |
| 2025 | Quarter-finals | 5th |
| 2027 | To be determined | |
| 2029 | To be determined | |

=== Central American and Caribbean Games ===
==== Men's team ====
| Year | Round | Pos |
|---|---|---|
| 2010 | Semi-finals | 3rd |

==== Women's team ====
| Year | Round | Pos |
|---|---|---|
| 2010 | Champions | 1st |

==== Mixed team ====
| Year | Round | Pos |
|---|---|---|
| 1990 | Champions | 1st |
| 1993 | Runners-up | 2nd |
| 2006 | Third place | 3rd |
| 2014 | Runners-up | 2nd |
| 2018 | Champions | 1st |
| 2023 | Champions | 1st |

**Red border color indicates tournament was held on home soil.

== Junior competitive record ==
=== Suhandinata Cup ===
| Year | Round | Pos |
|---|---|---|
| 2000 to 2009 | Did not enter | |
| 2010 | Group stage | 21st |
| 2011 | Did not enter | |
| 2012 | Did not enter | |
| 2013 | Did not enter | |
| 2014 | Did not enter | |
| 2015 | Group stage | 27th |
| 2016 | Group stage | 32nd |
| 2017 | Did not enter | |
| 2018 | Group stage | 22nd |
| 2019 | Did not enter | |
| 2022 | Did not enter | |
| 2023 | Did not enter | |
| 2024 | To be determined | |

=== Pan American Junior Team Championships ===
==== Mixed team ====
| Year | Round | Pos |
|---|---|---|
| 1977 | Third place | 3rd |
| 1978 | Third place | 3rd |
| 1979 | Fourth place | 4th |
| 1980 | Fourth place | 4th |
| 1981 | Fourth place | 4th |
| 1988 | Fifth place | 5th |
| 1990 | Fourth place | 4th |
| 1991 | Third place | 3rd |
| 1992 | Third place | 3rd |
| 1994 | Third place | 3rd |
| 1996 | Group stage | 5th |
| 1998 | Fourth place | 4th |
| 2000 | Group stage | 7th |
| 2002 | Did not enter | |
| 2004 | Group stage | 5th |
| 2006 | Group stage | |
| 2007 | Group stage | 5th |
| 2008 | Runners-up | 2nd |
| 2009 | Group stage | 7th |
| 2010 | Did not enter | |
| 2011 | Did not enter | |
| 2012 | Group stage | 5th |
| 2013 | Fourth place | 4th |
| 2014 | Third place | 3rd |
| 2015 | Fourth place | 4th |
| 2016 | Group stage | 7th |
| 2017 | Fourth place | 4th |
| 2018 | Group stage | 7th |
| 2019 | Did not enter | |
| 2021 | Third place | 3rd |
| 2022 | Group stage | 5th |
| 2023 | Fourth place | 4th |
| 2024 | Third place | 3rd |
| 2025 | Fourth place | 4th |
| 2026 | Group stage | 7th |

**Red border color indicates tournament was held on home soil.

== Players ==
=== Current squad ===
As of 2 January 2024

==== Men's team ====
| Name | DoB/Age | Ranking of event | | |
| Name | DoB/Age | MS | MD | XD |
|---|---|---|---|---|
| Luis Ramón Garrido | 10 May 1996 (age 30) | 78 | 717 | 361 |
| Job Castillo | 1 November 1992 (age 33) | 115 | 56 | 184 |
| Armando Gaitán | 13 August 2002 (age 23) | 133 | 717 | 237 |
| Luis Montoya | 8 December 2000 (age 25) | 234 | 56 | 55 |
| Mariano Elizondo | 8 November 2006 (age 19) | 1623 | 717 | 973 |
| Manuel Jaime Magaña | 29 April 2006 (age 20) | 1623 | 717 | - |

==== Women's team ====
| Name | DoB/Age | Ranking of event | | |
| Name | DoB/Age | WS | WD | XD |
|---|---|---|---|---|
| Vanessa García | 26 May 2004 (age 22) | 91 | - | - |
| Haramara Gaitán | 7 August 1997 (age 28) | 93 | 67 | 237 |
| Sabrina Solís | 30 August 1996 (age 29) | 98 | 67 | - |
| Miriam Jacqueline Rodríguez | 26 July 2004 (age 21) | - | 74 | 55 |
| Romina Fregoso | 20 August 2003 (age 22) | - | 74 | 184 |
| Mayté Macías | 31 March 2007 (age 19) | 541 | - | 633 |
