= Cuba national badminton team =

National badminton team representing Cuba

Cuba
- Association: Federación Cubana de Bádminton (FCB)
- Confederation: BPA (Pan America)
- President: Enrique Charadan

BWF ranking
- Current ranking: 71 ▲14 (2 January 2024)
- Highest ranking: 37 (1 October 2019)

Pan Am Mixed Team Championships
- Appearances: 2 (first in 2019)
- Best result: Fourth place (2019)

Pan Am Men's Team Championships
- Appearances: 1 (first in 2010)
- Best result: Group stage

Pan Am Women's Team Championships
- Appearances: 1 (first in 2006)
- Best result: Third place (2006)

The Cuba national badminton team (Spanish: Equipo nacional de bádminton de Cuba) represents Cuba in international badminton team competitions. The Cuban team is controlled by the Cuba Badminton Federation (Spanish: Federación Cubana de Bádminton), the governing body for badminton in Cuba. The Cuban men's team competed in the 2010 Pan Am Badminton Championships.

The Cuban mixed team debuted in the 2019 Pan Am Badminton Championships mixed team event. The team reached the semifinals but lost out to Canada. The team finished in fourth place after losing the bronze medal tie to Brazil. Cuba also competes in the Pan American Games and has won a silver and a bronze in badminton.

== Competitive record ==
=== Thomas Cup ===
Year	Round	Pos
1949	Did not enter	
1952	Did not enter	
1955	Did not enter	
1958	Did not enter	
1961	Did not enter	
1964	Did not enter	
1967	Did not enter	
1970	Did not enter	
1973	Did not enter	
1976	Did not enter	
1979	Did not enter	
1982	Did not enter	
1984	Did not enter	
1986	Did not enter	
1988	Did not enter	
1990	Did not enter	
1992	Did not enter	
1994	Did not enter	
1996	Did not enter	
1998	Did not enter	
2000	Did not enter	
2002	Did not qualify	
2004	Did not enter	
2006	Did not enter	
2008	Did not enter	
2010	Did not qualify	
2012	Did not enter	
2014	Did not enter	
2016	Did not enter	
2018	Did not enter	
2020	Did not enter	
2022	Did not enter	
2024	Did not enter	
2026	Did not enter	
2028	To be determined	
2030	To be determined	

=== Uber Cup ===
Year	Round	Pos
1957	Did not enter	
1960	Did not enter	
1963	Did not enter	
1966	Did not enter	
1969	Did not enter	
1972	Did not enter	
1975	Did not enter	
1978	Did not enter	
1981	Did not enter	
1984	Did not enter	
1986	Did not enter	
1988	Did not enter	
1990	Did not enter	
1992	Did not enter	
1994	Did not enter	
1996	Did not enter	
1998	Did not enter	
2000	Did not enter	
2002	Did not qualify	
2004	Did not enter	
2006	Did not qualify	
2008	Did not enter	
2010	Did not enter	
2012	Did not enter	
2014	Did not enter	
2016	Did not enter	
2018	Did not enter	
2020	Did not enter	
2022	Did not enter	
2024	Did not enter	
2026	Did not enter	
2028	To be determined	
2030	To be determined	

=== Sudirman Cup ===
Year	Round	Pos
1989	Did not enter	
1991	Did not enter	
1993	Did not enter	
1995	Did not enter	
1997	Did not enter	
1999	Did not enter	
2001	Did not enter	
2003	Did not enter	
2005	Did not enter	
2007	Did not enter	
2009	Did not enter	
2011	Did not enter	
2013	Did not enter	
2015	Did not enter	
2017	Did not enter	
2019	Did not enter	
2021	Did not enter	
2023	Did not enter	
2025	Did not qualify	
2027	TBD	
2029	TBD	

=== Pan American Team Championships ===
==== Men's team ====
Year	Round	Pos
2004	Did not enter	
2006	Did not enter	
2008	Did not enter	
2010	Group stage	
2012	Did not enter	
2016	Did not enter	
2018	Did not enter	
2020	Did not enter	
2022	Did not enter	
2024	Did not enter	
2026	Withdrew	
2028	To be determined	
2030	To be determined	

==== Women's team ====
Year	Round	Pos
2004	Did not enter	
2006	Third place	3rd
2008	Did not enter	
2010	Did not enter	
2012	Did not enter	
2016	Did not enter	
2018	Did not enter	
2020	Did not enter	
2022	Did not enter	
2024	Did not enter	
2026	Withdrew	
2028	To be determined	
2030	To be determined	

==== Mixed team ====
Year	Round	Pos
1977	Did not enter	
1978	Did not enter	
1979	Did not enter	
1980	Did not enter	
1987	Did not enter	
1989	Did not enter	
1991	Did not enter	
1993	Did not enter	
1997	Did not enter	
2001	Did not enter	
2004	Did not enter	
2005	Did not enter	
2008	Did not enter	
2009	Did not enter	
2010	Did not enter	
2012	Did not enter	
2013	Did not enter	
2014	Did not enter	
2016	Did not enter	
2017	Did not enter	
2019	Fourth place	4th
2023	Did not enter	
2025	Group stage	8th
2027	To be determined	
2029	To be determined	

=== Central American and Caribbean Games ===
==== Men's team ====
Year	Round	Pos
2010	Did not enter	

==== Women's team ====
Year	Round	Pos
2010	Did not enter	

==== Mixed team ====
Year	Round	Pos
1990	Did not enter	
2006	Champions	1st
2014	Third place	3rd
2018	Runners-up	2nd
2023	Did not enter	

=== CAREBACO Team Championships ===
==== Mixed team ====
Year	Round	Pos
1972	Did not enter	
1973	Did not enter	
1974	Did not enter	
1975	Did not enter	
1976	Did not enter	
1978	Did not enter	
1979	Did not enter	
1980	Did not enter	
1981	Did not enter	
1982	Did not enter	
1983	Did not enter	
1984	Did not enter	
1985	Did not enter	
1986	Did not enter	
1987	Did not enter	
1988	Did not enter	
1990	Did not enter	
1992	Did not enter	
1993	Did not enter	
1995	Did not enter	
1996	Did not enter	
1997	Did not enter	
1998	Champions	1st
1999	Did not enter	
2001	Did not enter	
2002	Did not enter	
2003	Did not enter	
2004	Did not enter	
2005	Champions	1st
2011	Did not enter	
2012	Did not enter	
2014	Did not enter	
2015	Did not enter	
2016	Did not enter	
2017	Did not enter	
2018	Did not enter	

**Red border color indicates tournament was held on home soil.

== Junior competitive record ==
=== Suhandinata Cup ===
Year	Round	Pos
2000	Did not enter	
2002	Did not enter	
2004	Did not enter	
2006	Did not enter	
2007	Did not enter	
2008	Did not enter	
2009	Did not enter	
2010	Did not enter	
2011	Did not enter	
2012	Did not enter	
2013	Did not enter	
2014	Did not enter	
2015	Group stage	23rd
2016	Did not enter	
2017	Did not enter	
2018	Did not enter	
2019	Did not enter	
2022	Did not enter	
2023	Did not enter	
2024	TBD	

=== Pan American Junior Team Championships ===
==== Mixed team ====
Year	Round	Pos
1977	Did not enter	
1980	Did not enter	
1981	Did not enter	
1988	Did not enter	
1990	Did not enter	
1991	Did not enter	
1992	Did not enter	
1994	Did not enter	
1996	Did not enter	
1998	Did not enter	
2000	Third place	3rd
2002	Did not enter	
2004	Did not enter	
2006	Did not enter	
2007	Did not enter	
2008	Did not enter	
2009	Did not enter	
2010	Did not enter	
2011	Did not enter	
2012	Did not enter	
2013	Did not enter	
2014	Did not enter	
2015	Did not enter	
2016	Did not enter	
2017	Did not enter	
2018	Did not enter	
2019	Did not enter	
2021	Did not enter	
2022	Did not enter	
2023	Did not enter	
2024	TBD	

=== CAREBACO Junior Team Championships ===
==== Mixed team ====
Year	Round	Pos
1976	Did not enter	
1978	Did not enter	
1979	Did not enter	
1980	Did not enter	
1981	Did not enter	
1982	Did not enter	
1983	Did not enter	
1984	Did not enter	
1985	Did not enter	
1986	Did not enter	
1987	Did not enter	
1988	Did not enter	
1990	Did not enter	
1992	Did not enter	
1993	Did not enter	
1995	Did not enter	
1996	Did not enter	
1997	Did not enter	
1998	Runners-up	2nd
1999	Did not enter	
2000	Did not enter	
2001	Did not enter	
2002	Did not enter	
2003	Did not enter	
2004	Did not enter	
2005	Champions	1st
2011	Did not enter	
2012	Did not enter	
2013	Did not enter	
2014	Did not enter	
2015	Did not enter	
2016	Did not enter	
2017	Did not enter	

**Red border color indicates tournament was held on home soil.

== Players ==
=== Current squad ===
As of 2 January 2024

==== Men's team ====
Name	DoB/Age	Ranking of event		
Name	DoB/Age	MS	MD	XD
Roberto Herrera	13 October 2002 (age 23)	344	193	539
Juan Bencomo	1 January 2004 (age 22)	423	193	303
Yosuan Pita Segura	16 May 2003 (age 22)	1134	941	-
Manuel del Rosario Pargas	1 November 1995 (age 30)	1134	941	-

==== Women's team ====
Name	DoB/Age	Ranking of event		
Name	DoB/Age	WS	WD	XD
Taymara Oropeza	6 December 1995 (age 30)	165	115	303
Yeily Ortiz	30 September 2001 (age 24)	275	115	361
Claudia Dominguez	13 September 2007 (age 18)	889	589	973
Maidalis Zamora	14 November 2008 (age 17)	889	589	-
