= 2019 BWF International Series =

The 2019 BWF International Series was the twelfth season of the BWF International Series.

== Schedule ==
Below is the schedule released by Badminton World Federation:

Tour	Official title	Venue	City	Date		Prize money USD	Prospectus	Report
Tour	Official title	Venue	City	Start	Finish	Prize money USD	Prospectus	Report
1	(Estonia) YONEX Estonian International 2019	Kalev Sports Hall	Tallinn	10 January	13 January	10,000		Report
2	(Sweden) RSL Swedish Open 2019	Sparbanken Skåne Arena	Lund	17 January	20 January	10,000		Report
3	(Laos) BEERLAO Lao International Series 2019	Settha Badminton Club	Vientiane	19 February	24 February	10,000		Report
4	Uganda International 2019	MTN Arena	Kampala	21 February	24 February	10,000		Report
5	V Jamaica International 2019	National Indoor Sport Centre	Kingston	6 March	10 March	10,000		Report
6	(Portugal) 54 Portuguese International Championships 2019	High Performance Center for Badminton	Caldas da Rainha	7 March	10 March	10,000		Report
7	(New Zealand) YONEX Waikato International 2019	Eastlink Badminton Stadium	Hamilton	28 March	31 March	10,000		Report
8	(Netherlands) 20th Victor Dutch International 2019	VELO Hall	Wateringen	11 April	14 April	10,000		Report
9	FZ FORZA Slovenia International 2019	Sporthall Medvode	Medvode	15 May	18 May	10,000		Report
10	FLEET Mauritius International 2019	National Badminton Center	Rose Hill	13 June	16 June	10,000		Report
11	Malaysia International Series 2019	Arena Badminton Perak	Ipoh, Perak	18 June	23 June	10,000		Report
12	(Peru) Perú International 2019	Polideportivo 2 - CAR Videna	Lima	19 June	23 June	10,000		Report
13	Benin International 2019	Stade de l'Amitié - Général Mathieu Kerekou	Cotonou	27 June	30 June	10,000		Report
14	(Ivory Coast) Côte d'Ivoire International 2019	Honore Zolobe	Abidjan	4 July	7 July	10,000		Report
15	(United States) 2019 Silicon Valley International Series	Newark Event Center	Newark, California	17 July	21 July	10,000		Report
16	2019 Ghana International International Series	SSNIT Emporium Sports Center	Accra	17 July	21 July	10,000		Report
17	(Greece) Hellas Open 2019	Kleisto Gymnastirio Sidirokastro	Sidirokastro	8 August	11 August	10,000		Report
18	(Bulgaria) Bulgarian Open Championship 2019	Badminton Hall "Europe"	Sofia	12 August	15 August	10,000		Report
19	(Barbados) 2019 Carebaco International	Sir Garfield Sobers Gymnasium	Saint Michael	20 August	25 August	10,000		Report
20	Belarus International 2019	Falcon Club	Minsk	29 August	1 September	10,000		Report
21	Myanmar International Series 2019	National Badminton Stadium	Yangon	10 September	15 September	10,000		Report
22	(Australia) Sydney International 2019	Sports Hall	Sydney	18 September	22 September	10,000		Report
23	(Poland) Polish International 2019	Sport Hall	Bierun	19 September	22 September	10,000		Report
24	(Mexico) X Internacional Mexicano 2019	Gimnasio De Ciudad Deportiva	Aguascalientes City	19 September	22 September	10,000		Report
25	VI Guatemala International Series 2019	Gimnasio Teodoro Palacios Flores	Guatemala City	25 September	29 September	10,000		Report
26	ANNAPURNA Nepal International Series 2019	National Sports Council	Kathmandu	25 September	29 September	10,000		Report
27	Bahrain International Series 2019	Khalifa Sport City	Isa Town	9 October	13 October	10,000		Report
28	Brazil International Series 2019	Clube Fonte São Paulo	Campinas	10 October	13 October	10,000		Report
29	Egypt International 2019	Egyptian Badminton Federation	Cairo	17 October	20 October	10,000		Report
30	(Dominican Republic) X Santo Domingo Open 2019	Volleyball Pavilion	Santo Domingo	22 October	26 October	10,000		Report
31	Algeria International 2019	Cite olympique Mohamed Boudief	Algiers	24 October	27 October	10,000		Report
32	CONDENSATE Kazakhstan International Series 2019	sport hall of TH "Nafta"	Uralsk	6 November	10 November	10,000		Report
33	Pakistan International Series 2019	Pakistan Sports Complex	Islamabad	7 November	10 November	10,000		Report
34	(Norway) FZ FORZA Norwegian International 2019	Jotunhallen	Sandefjord	7 November	10 November	10,000		Report
35	XIII Suriname International 2019	Ring Sport Center	Paramaribo	12 November	16 November	10,000		Report
36	Cameroon International 2019	TBC	Yaounde	14 November	17 November	10,000		Report
37	(Wales) VICTOR Welsh International 2019	Sport Wales National Centre	Cardiff	27 November	30 November	10,000		Report
38	Turkey Open 2019	Olympic Center	Ankara	19 December	22 December	10,000		Report

== Results ==
=== Winners ===
Tour	Men's singles	Women's singles	Men's doubles	Women's doubles	Mixed doubles
Estonia	(France) Arnaud Merklé	(Japan) Asuka Takahashi	(England) Peter Briggs (England) Gregory Mairs	(Denmark) Julie Finne-Ipsen (Denmark) Mai Surrow	(Singapore) Danny Bawa Chrisnanta (Singapore) Tan Wei Han
Sweden	(Japan) Minoru Koga	(Japan) Mako Urushizaki	(Denmark) Mathias Bay-Smidt (Denmark) Lasse Mølhede	(Denmark) Amalie Magelund (Denmark) Freja Ravn	(Singapore) Danny Bawa Chrisnanta (Singapore) Tan Wei Han
Laos	(Japan) Kodai Naraoka	(Japan) Natsuki Oie	(Malaysia) Chooi Kah Ming (Malaysia) Low Juan Shen	(Singapore) Jin Yujia (Singapore) Lim Ming Hui	(Thailand) Weeraphat Phakjarung (Thailand) Chasinee Korepap
Uganda	(India) Rahul Bharadwaj	(Myanmar) Thet Htar Thuzar	(Nigeria) Godwin Olofua (Nigeria) Anuoluwapo Juwon Opeyori	(Egypt) Doha Hany (Egypt) Hadia Hosny	(United States) Howard Shu (United States) Paula Lynn Obanana
Jamaica	(Japan) Kodai Naraoka	(Wales) Jordan Hart	(Guatemala) Jonathan Solís (Guatemala) Rodolfo Ramírez	(United States) Breanna Chi (United States) Jennie Gai	(Brazil) Artur Silva Pomoceno (Brazil) Lohaynny Vicente
Portugal	(Sweden) Felix Burestedt	(Thailand) Porntip Buranaprasertsuk	(Chinese Taipei) Chang Ko-chi (Chinese Taipei) Lee Fang-jen	(Denmark) Julie Finne-Ipsen (Sweden) Clara Nistad	(Chinese Taipei) Chang Ko-chi (Chinese Taipei) Lee Chih-chen
(New Zealand) Waikato	(Vietnam) Nguyễn Tiến Minh	(China) Wang Siqi	(China) Xuheng Zhuanyi (China) Zhang Binrong	(China) Hou Fangfang (China) Li Jiajia	(Japan) Hiroki Midorikawa (Japan) Natsu Saito
(Netherlands) Dutch	(India) Harsheel Dani	(Denmark) Line Christophersen	(Denmark) Daniel Lundgaard (Denmark) Mathias Thyrri	(Denmark) Amalie Magelund (Denmark) Freja Ravn	(Denmark) Mathias Thyrri (Denmark) Elisa Melgaard
Slovenia	(India) Sourabh Verma	(Spain) Clara Azurmendi	(Japan) Shohei Hoshino (Japan) Yujiro Nishikawa	(England) Jenny Moore (England) Victoria Williams	(England) Gregory Mairs (England) Victoria Williams
Mauritius	(Malaysia) Goh Giap Chin	(Myanmar) Thet Htar Thuzar	(Malaysia) Boon Xin Yuan (Malaysia) Yap Qar Siong	(Malaysia) Kasturi Radhakrishnan (Malaysia) Venosha Radhakrishnan	(United States) Vinson Chiu (United States) Breanna Chi
Malaysia	(Malaysia) Soong Joo Ven	(Indonesia) Sri Fatmawati	(Indonesia) Leo Rolly Carnando (Indonesia) Daniel Marthin	(Malaysia) Thinaah Muralitharan (Malaysia) Pearly Tan Koong Le	(Indonesia) Amri Syahnawi (Indonesia) Pia Zebadiah Bernadet
Peru	(Canada) Brian Yang	(Indonesia) Ghaida Nurul Ghaniyu	(Guatemala) Rubén Castellanos (Guatemala) Aníbal Marroquín	(Guatemala) Diana Corleto (Guatemala) Nikté Sotomayor	(United States) Howard Shu (United States) Paula Lynn Obañana
Benin	(Sri Lanka) Niluka Karunaratne	(Myanmar) Thet Htar Thuzar	(Nigeria) Godwin Olofua (Nigeria) Anuoluwapo Juwon Opeyori	(Peru) Daniela Macías (Peru) Dánica Nishimura	(United States) Howard Shu (United States) Paula Lynn Obañana
(Ivory Coast) Cote d'Ivoire	(India) Alap Mishra	(Myanmar) Thet Htar Thuzar	(Egypt) Adham Hatem Elgamal (Egypt) Ahmed Salah	(Iran) Samin Abedkhojasteh (Iran) Sorayya Aghaei	(United States) Howard Shu (United States) Paula Lynn Obañana
(United States) Silicon Valley	(Canada) Xiaodong Sheng	(Japan) Natsuki Nidaira	(South Korea) Jung Tae-in (South Korea) Kim Young-hyuk	(United States) Annie Xu (United States) Kerry Xu	(South Korea) Kim Young-hyuk (South Korea) Park Sang-eun
Ghana	(India) Kiran George	(Vietnam) Vũ Thị Trang	(India) Arjun M.R. (India) Ramchandran Shlok	(India) K. Maneesha (India) Rutaparna Panda	(India) Ramchandran Shlok (India) Rutaparna Panda
Greece	(Malaysia) Lim Chong King	(Malaysia) Kisona Selvaduray	(France) Eloi Adam (France) Julien Maio	(France) Vimala Hériau (France) Margot Lambert	(France) Fabien Delrue (France) Vimala Hériau
Bulgaria	(France) Toma Junior Popov	(Turkey) Neslihan Yigit	(France) Eloi Adam (France) Julien Maio	(Turkey) Bengisu Erçetin (Turkey) Nazlıcan İnci	(Canada) Joshua Hurlburt-Yu (Canada) Josephine Wu
(Barbados) Carebaco	(England) Sam Parsons	(Wales) Jordan Hart	(Jamaica) Gareth Henry (Jamaica) Samuel Ricketts	(Barbados) Monyata Riviera (Barbados) Tamisha Williams	(United States) Vinson Chiu (United States) Breanna Chi
Belarus	(China) Lei Lanxi	(China) Wang Zhiyi	(China) Ou Xuanyi (China) Zhang Nan	(China) Yu Xiaohan (China) Zhang Shuxian	(China) Ren Xiangyu (China) Zhou Chaomin
Myanmar	(India) Kaushal Dharmamer	(Indonesia) Sri Fatmawati	(Indonesia) Emanuel Randhy Febryto (Indonesia) Ferdian Mahardika Ranialdy	(Chinese Taipei) Liu Chiao-yun (Chinese Taipei) Wang Yu-qiao	(Chinese Taipei) Lin Yong-sheng (Chinese Taipei) Liu Chiao-yun
(Australia) Sydney	(Japan) Yusuke Onodera	(Malaysia) Selvaduray Kisona	(Chinese Taipei) Chen Xin-yuan (Chinese Taipei) Lin Yu-chieh	(Chinese Taipei) Cheng Yu-chieh (Chinese Taipei) Tseng Yu-chi	(Philippines) Peter Gabriel Magnaye (Philippines) Thea Marie Pomar
Poland	(Denmark) Mads Christophersen	(Wales) Jordan Hart	(England) Zach Russ (England) Steven Stallwood	(Denmark) Amalie Magelund (Denmark) Freja Ravn	(Denmark) Mikkel Mikkelsen (Denmark) Amalie Magelund
Mexico	(Guatemala) Kevin Cordón	(Indonesia) Ghaida Nurul Ghaniyu	(Guatemala) Jonathan Solís (Guatemala) Aníbal Marroquín	(United States) Breanna Chi (United States) Jennie Gai	(Mexico) Luis Montoya (Mexico) Vanessa Villalobos
Guatemala	(Guatemala) Kevin Cordón	(Indonesia) Ghaida Nurul Ghaniyu	(Brazil) Fabrício Farias (Brazil) Francielton Farias	(Brazil) Jaqueline Lima (Brazil) Sâmia Lima	(Brazil) Fabrício Farias (Brazil) Jaqueline Lima
Nepal	(Malaysia) Yeoh Seng Zoe	(India) Malvika Bansod	(India) Rohan Kapoor (India) Saurabh Sharma	(Nepal) Pooja Shrestha (Nepal) Nangsal Tamang	(India) Venkat Gaurav Prasad (India) Juhi Dewangan
Bahrain	(India) Priyanshu Rajawat	(Indonesia) Sri Fatmawati	(Thailand) Prad Tangsrirapeephan (Thailand) Apichasit Teerawiwat	(Peru) Daniela Macías (Peru) Dánica Nishimura	(India) Venkat Gaurav Prasad (India) Juhi Dewangan
Brazil	(Guatemala) Kevin Cordón	(Brazil) Jaqueline Lima	(Brazil) Fabrício Farias (Brazil) Francielton Farias	(Brazil) Jaqueline Lima (Brazil) Sâmia Lima	(Brazil) Fabrício Farias (Brazil) Jaqueline Lima
Egypt	(Azerbaijan) Ade Resky Dwicahyo	(Myanmar) Thet Htar Thuzar	(Algeria) Koceila Mammeri (Algeria) Youcef Sabri Medel	(India) Simran Singhi (India) Ritika Thaker	(India) Dhruv Rawat (India) Kuhoo Garg
(Dominican Republic) Santo Domingo	(Canada) Brian Yang	(Brazil) Fabiana Silva	(Cuba) Osleni Guerrero (Cuba) Leodannis Martínez	(Brazil) Jaqueline Lima (Brazil) Sâmia Lima	(Brazil) Fabrício Farias (Brazil) Jaqueline Lima
Algeria	(Spain) Pablo Abián	(France) Marie Batomene	(Algeria) Koceila Mammeri (Algeria) Youcef Sabri Medel	(Peru) Daniela Macías (Peru) Dánica Nishimura	(Belgium) Jona Van Nieuwkerke (Belgium) Lise Jaques
Kazakhstan	(Denmark) Ditlev Jæger Holm	(Russia) Natalia Perminova	(Denmark) Jeppe Bruun (Denmark) Ditlev Jæger Holm	(Russia) Viktoriia Kozyreva (Russia) Mariia Sukhova	(Denmark) Jeppe Bruun (Denmark) Irina Amalie Andersen
Pakistan	(Thailand) Saran Jamsri	(Pakistan) Mahoor Shahzad	(Thailand) Prad Tangsrirapeephan (Thailand) Apichasit Teerawiwat	(Maldives) Aminath Nabeeha Abdul Razzaq (Maldives) Fathimath Nabaaha Abdul Razzaq	(Maldives) Hussein Zayan Shaheed (Maldives) Fathimath Nabaaha Abdul Razzaq
Norway	(Chinese Taipei) Lin Yu-hsien	(Chinese Taipei) Sung Shuo-yun	(Chinese Taipei) Lee Fang-chih (Chinese Taipei) Lee Fang-jen	(Sweden) Emma Karlsson (Sweden) Johanna Magnusson	(Denmark) Mads Emil Christensen (Sweden) Emma Karlsson
Suriname	(Canada) Brian Yang	(Mexico) Haramara Gaitan	(Suriname) Mitchel Wongsodikromo (Suriname) Danny Chen	(Peru) Daniela Macías (Peru) Danica Nishimura	(Barbados) Shae Martin (Barbados) Sabrina Scott
Cameroon	(Azerbaijan) Ade Resky Dwicahyo	(Iran) Sorayya Aghaei	(Nigeria) Godwin Olofua (Nigeria) Anuoluwapo Juwon Opeyori	(Egypt) Doha Hany (Egypt) Hadia Hosny	(Egypt) Adham Hatem Elgamal (Egypt) Doha Hany
Wales	(Denmark) Ditlev Jæger Holm	(Spain) Clara Azurmendi	(Chinese Taipei) Chiang Chien-wei (Chinese Taipei) Ye Hong-wei	(England) Abigail Holden (England) Lizzie Tolman	(Scotland) Alexander Dunn (Scotland) Ciara Torrance
Turkey	(Spain) Luís Enrique Peñalver	(Turkey) Neslihan Yiğit	(Denmark) Mikkel Stoffersen (Denmark) Mads Vestergaard	(Turkey) Bengisu Erçetin (Turkey) Nazlıcan İnci	(Denmark) Mikkel Stoffersen (Denmark) Susan Ekelund

=== Performance by nation (sub-total) ===
Rank	Nation	(Estonia)	(Sweden)	(Laos)	(Uganda)	(Jamaica)	(Portugal)	(New Zealand)	(Netherlands)	(Slovenia)	(Mauritius)	(Malaysia)	(Peru)	(Benin)	(Ivory Coast)	(United States)	(Ghana)	(Greece)	(Bulgaria)	(Barbados)	(Belarus)	(Myanmar)	(Australia)	(Poland)	(Mexico)	Subtotal
1	Denmark	1	2				0.5		4															3		10.5
2	Japan	1	2	2		1		1		1						1							1			10
3	India				1				1	1					1		4					1				9
3	Malaysia			1							3	2						2					1			9
3	United States				1	1					1		1	1	1	1				1					1	9
6	China							3													5					8
7	Indonesia											3	1									2			1	7
8	Chinese Taipei						2															2	2			6
8	France	1																3	2							6
10	England	1								2										1				1		5
10	Guatemala					1							2												2	5
12	Myanmar				1						1			1	1											4
13	Canada												1			1			1							3
13	Singapore	1	1	1																						3
13	Wales					1														1				1		3
16	Egypt				1										1											2
16	Nigeria				1									1												2
16	South Korea															2										2
16	Thailand			1			1																			2
16	Turkey																		2							2
16	Vietnam							1									1									2
22	Sweden						1.5																			1.5
23	Barbados																			1						1
23	Brazil					1																				1
23	Iran														1											1
23	Jamaica																			1						1
23	Mexico																								1	1
23	Peru													1												1
23	Philippines																						1			1
23	Spain									1																1
23	Sri Lanka													1												1

=== Performance by nation (total) ===
Rank	Nation	Subtotal	(Guatemala)	(Nepal)	(Bahrain)	(Brazil)	(Egypt)	(Dominican Republic)	(Algeria)	(Kazakhstan)	(Pakistan)	(Norway)	(Suriname)	(Cameroon)	(Wales)	(Turkey)	Total
1	Denmark	10.5								3		0.5			1	2	17
2	India	9		3	2		2										16
3	Brazil	1	3			4		3									11
4	Chinese Taipei	6										3			1		10
4	Japan	10															10
4	Malaysia	9		1													10
7	Indonesia	7	1		1												9
7	United States	9															9
9	China	8															8
10	France	6							1								7
10	Guatemala	5	1			1											7
12	England	5													1		6
13	Canada	3						1					1				5
13	Myanmar	4					1										5
13	Thailand	2			1						2						5
16	Egypt	2												2			4
16	Peru	1			1				1				1				4
16	Spain	1							1						1	1	4
16	Turkey	2														2	4
20	Nigeria	2												1			3
20	Singapore	3															3
20	Sweden	1.5										1.5					3
20	Wales	3															3
24	Algeria	0					1		1								2
24	Azerbaijan	0					1							1			2
24	Barbados	1											1				2
24	Iran	1												1			2
24	Maldives	0									2						2
24	Mexico	1											1				2
24	Russia	0								2							2
24	South Korea	2															2
24	Vietnam	2															2
33	Belgium	0							1								1
33	Cuba	0						1									1
33	Jamaica	1															1
33	Nepal	0		1													1
33	Pakistan	0									1						1
33	Philippines	1															1
33	Scotland	0													1		1
33	Sri Lanka	1															1
33	Suriname	0											1				1

=== Players with multiple titles ===
In alphabetical order.

Rank	Player	MS	WS	MD	WD	XD	Total
1	(Brazil) Jaqueline Lima		1		3	3	7
2	(Brazil) Fabrício Farias			2		3	5
2	(Myanmar) Thet Htar Thuzar		5				5
4	(Denmark) Amalie Magelund				3	1	4
4	(Peru) Daniela Macías				4		4
4	(Peru) Dánica Nishimura				4		4
4	(United States) Breanna Chi				2	2	4
4	(United States) Paula Lynn Obañana					4	4
4	(United States) Howard Shu					4	4
10	(Brazil) Sâmia Lima				3		3
10	(Canada) Brian Yang	3					3
10	(Denmark) Ditlev Jæger Holm	2		1			3
10	(Denmark) Freja Ravn				3		3
10	(Egypt) Doha Hany				2	1	3
10	(Guatemala) Kevin Cordón	3					3
10	(Indonesia) Sri Fatmawati		3				3
10	(Indonesia) Ghaida Nurul Ghaniyu		3				3
10	(Nigeria) Godwin Olofua			3			3
10	(Nigeria) Anuoluwapo Juwon Opeyori			3			3
10	(Wales) Jordan Hart		3				3
21	(Algeria) Koceila Mammeri			2			2
21	(Algeria) Youcef Sabri Medel			2			2
21	(Azerbaijan) Ade Resky Dwicahyo	2					2
21	(Brazil) Francielton Farias			2			2
21	(Chinese Taipei) Chang Ko-chi			1		1	2
21	(Chinese Taipei) Lee Fang-jen			2			2
21	(Chinese Taipei) Liu Chiao-yun				1	1	2
21	(Denmark) Jeppe Bruun			1		1	2
21	(Denmark) Julie Finne-Ipsen				2		2
21	(Denmark) Mikkel Stoffersen			1		1	2
21	(Denmark) Mathias Thyrri			1		1	2
21	(Egypt) Adham Hatem Elgamal			1		1	2
21	(Egypt) Hadia Hosny				2		2
21	(England) Gregory Mairs			1		1	2
21	(England) Victoria Williams				1	1	2
21	(France) Eloi Adam			2			2
21	(France) Vimala Hériau				1	1	2
21	(France) Julien Maio			2			2
21	(Guatemala) Aníbal Marroquín			2			2
21	(Guatemala) Jonathan Solís			2			2
21	(India) Juhi Dewangan					2	2
21	(India) Rutaparna Panda				1	1	2
21	(India) Venkat Gaurav Prasad					2	2
21	(India) Ramchandran Shlok			1		1	2
21	(Iran) Sorayya Aghaei		1		1		2
21	(Japan) Kodai Naraoka	2					2
21	(Malaysia) Selvaduray Kisona		2				2
21	(Maldives) Fathimath Nabaaha Abdul Razzaq				1	1	2
21	(Singapore) Danny Bawa Chrisnanta					2	2
21	(Singapore) Tan Wei Han					2	2
21	(South Korea) Kim Young-hyuk			1		1	2
21	(Spain) Clara Azurmendi		2				2
21	(Sweden) Emma Karlsson				1	1	2
21	(Thailand) Prad Tangsrirapeephan			2			2
21	(Thailand) Apichasit Teerawiwat			2			2
21	(Turkey) Bengisu Erçetin				2		2
21	(Turkey) Nazlıcan İnci				2		2
21	(Turkey) Neslihan Yiğit		2				2
21	(United States) Vinson Chiu					2	2
21	(United States) Jennie Gai				2		2
