= Badminton at the 2023 Pan American Games – Women's doubles =

Badminton – Women's doubles at the 2023 Pan American Games
- Venue: Olympic Training Center
- Start date: October 22, 2023
- End date: October 25, 2023
- Competitors: 32 from 12 nations

Medalists
| Gold medal | Catherine Choi; Josephine Wu | Canada |
| Silver medal | Annie Xu; Kerry Xu | United States |
| Bronze medal | Romina Fregoso; Miriam Rodríguez | Mexico |
| Bronze medal | Juliana Vieira; Sânia Lima | Brazil |

The women's doubles badminton event at the 2023 Pan American Games was held from October 22 to 25 at the Olympic Training Center, located in Ñuñoa, a suburb of Santiago. The defending Pan American Games champion are Rachel Honderich and Kristen Tsai of Canada, who will not defend their titles.

Each National Olympic Committee could enter a maximum of two pairs into the competition. The athletes will be drawn into an elimination stage draw. Once a pair lost a match, they will be no longer able to compete. Each match will be contested as the best of three games. A total of 32 athletes from 12 NOC's competed.

== Qualification ==
A total of 90 athletes (45 men and 45 women) qualified to compete at the games. A nation may enter a maximum of four athletes per gender (five if qualified through the 2021 Junior Pan American Games). As host nation, Chile automatically qualified a full team of eight athletes. All other quotas will be awarded through the team world rankings as of May 2, 2023. Each nation's highest ranked athlete/pair's points in each of the five events will be added to determine a country's point total.

== Seeds ==
The following pairs were seeded:

1. Catherine Choi / Josephine Wu (CAN) (champions, gold medalists)
2. Annie Xu / Kerry Xu (USA) (final, silver medalists)
3. Jaqueline Lima / Sâmia Lima (BRA) (first round, withdrew)
4. Juliana Vieira / Sânia Lima (BRA) (semi-finals, bronze medalists)

== Results ==
=== Bracket ===
First Round
1 | Catherine Choi (CAN); Josephine Wu (CAN) | 21 | 21
Mariana Palacios (EAI); Adriana Barrios (EAI) | 3 | 3
Inés Castillo (PER); Paula la Torre (PER) | 21 | 21
Fátima Centeno (ESA); Daniela Hernández (ESA) | 10 | 12
3 | Jaqueline Lima (BRA); Sâmia Lima (BRA)
Romina Fregoso (MEX); Miriam Rodríguez (MEX) | w/o
Camila Astorga (CHI); Valeria Santos (CHI) | 17 | 12
Tahlia Richardson (JAM); Katherine Wynter (JAM) | 21 | 21
Nairoby Jiménez (DOM); Alissa Acosta (DOM) | 10 | 11
Wen Yu Zhang (CAN); Eliana Zhang (CAN) | 21 | 21
Ashley Montre (CHI); Vania Díaz (CHI) | 6 | 8
4 | Juliana Vieira (BRA); Sânia Lima (BRA) | 21 | 21
Taymara Oropesa (CUB); Yeily Ortiz (CUB) | 17 | 19
Diana Corleto (EAI); Nikté Sotomayor (EAI) | 21 | 21
Ailén Oliva (ARG); Iona Gualdi (ARG) | 6 | 5
2 | Annie Xu (USA); Kerry Xu (USA) | 21 | 21

Quarter-finals
1 | Catherine Choi (CAN); Josephine Wu (CAN) | 21 | 21
Inés Castillo (PER); Paula la Torre (PER) | 9 | 9
Romina Fregoso (MEX); Miriam Rodríguez (MEX) | 21 | 21
Tahlia Richardson (JAM); Katherine Wynter (JAM) | 19 | 16
Wen Yu Zhang (CAN); Eliana Zhang (CAN) | 9 | 21 | 18
4 | Juliana Vieira (BRA); Sânia Lima (BRA) | 21 | 19 | 21
Diana Corleto (EAI); Nikté Sotomayor (EAI) | 8 | 6
2 | Annie Xu (USA); Kerry Xu (USA) | 21 | 21

Semi-finals
1 | Catherine Choi (CAN); Josephine Wu (CAN) | 21 | 21
Romina Fregoso (MEX); Miriam Rodríguez (MEX) | 10 | 7
4 | Juliana Vieira (BRA); Sânia Lima (BRA) | 7 | 18
2 | Annie Xu (USA); Kerry Xu (USA) | 21 | 21

Final
1 | Catherine Choi (CAN); Josephine Wu (CAN) | 21 | 10 | 21
2 | Annie Xu (USA); Kerry Xu (USA) | 18 | 21 | 17
