= Inés Castillo =

Peruvian badminton player

Personal information
- Born: Inés Lucía Castillo Salazar; 7 December 1999 (age 26) Boynton Beach, Florida, U.S.
- Height: 1.64 m (5 ft 5 in)

Sport
- Country: Peru
- Sport: Badminton

Women's singles & doubles
- Highest ranking: 47 (WS, 2 July 2024); 66 (WD with Paula la Torre, 21 March 2023); 55 (XD with José Guevara, 7 November 2023)
- Current ranking: 86 (WS, 27 October 2026)
- BWF profile
Medal record
Women's badminton
Representing Peru
Pan American Games
Bronze medal – third place	2023 Santiago	Mixed doubles
Pan Am Championships
Bronze medal – third place	2018 Guatemala City	Women's doubles
Pan Am Female Cup
Bronze medal – third place	2018 Tacarigua	Women's team
South American Games
Silver medal – second place	2018 Cochabamba	Mixed team
Silver medal – second place	2022 Asunción	Mixed team
Silver medal – second place	2026 Santa Fe	Women's singles
Silver medal – second place	2026 Santa Fe	Mixed team
Bronze medal – third place	2018 Cochabamba	Women's singles
Bronze medal – third place	2018 Cochabamba	Women's doubles
Bronze medal – third place	2022 Asunción	Women's singles
Bronze medal – third place	2022 Asunción	Women's doubles
Bronze medal – third place	2026 Santa Fe	Women's doubles
South American Championships
Gold medal – first place	2017 Rio de Janeiro	Mixed team
Gold medal – first place	2018 Lima	Mixed team
Gold medal – first place	2019 Guayaquil	Mixed team
Gold medal – first place	2020 Lima	Mixed team
Gold medal – first place	2022 Lima	Women's singles
Gold medal – first place	2022 Lima	Mixed doubles
Gold medal – first place	2022 Lima	Mixed team
Silver medal – second place	2020 Lima	Women's singles
Silver medal – second place	2020 Lima	Women's doubles
Bronze medal – third place	2018 Lima	Women's singles
Bronze medal – third place	2018 Lima	Women's doubles
Bronze medal – third place	2019 Guayaquil	Women's singles
Bronze medal – third place	2019 Guayaquil	Women's doubles
Bronze medal – third place	2019 Guayaquil	Mixed doubles
Bronze medal – third place	2022 Lima	Women's doubles
Bolivarian Games
Gold medal – first place	2022 Valledupar	Women's singles
Gold medal – first place	2022 Valledupar	Women's doubles
Gold medal – first place	2022 Valledupar	Mixed doubles
Gold medal – first place	2022 Valledupar	Mixed team
Silver medal – second place	2017 Santa Marta	Mixed team
Bronze medal – third place	2017 Santa Marta	Women's doubles
Junior Pan American Games
Bronze medal – third place	2021 Cali–Valle	Girls' singles
Pan Am Junior Championships
Bronze medal – third place	2016 Lima	Girls' doubles

Inés Lucía Castillo Salazar (Note: In this Spanish name, the first or paternal surname is Castillo and the second or maternal family name is Salazar.) (born 7 December 1999) is a Peruvian badminton player. She represented Peru in women's singles at the 2024 Summer Olympics.

== Career ==
In 2016, Castillo competed at the 2016 BWF World Junior Championships and reached the second round. In 2018, she reached the semi-finals of the Pan American Championships with her partner Paula la Torre but lost to Rachel Honderich and Kristen Tsai 10–21, 12–21.

In 2021, Castillo won a bronze medal at the Junior Pan American Games.

In 2023, Castillo won a bronze medal at the 2023 Pan American Games in the mixed doubles event with José Guevara. In 2024, she qualified for the 2024 Summer Olympics. She was placed in Group J with Aya Ohori of Japan and Neslihan Arın of Turkey. She lost her first match to Arın 16–21, 17–21 and then her second match to Ohori 12–21, 8–21.

== Personal life ==
Castillo was born in Boynton Beach, Florida. Her father, Gonzalo Castillo is a former badminton player and president of the Peru Badminton Federation.

== Achievements ==
=== Pan American Games ===
Mixed doubles
Year	Venue	Partner	Opponent	Score	Result
2023	Olympic Training Center; Santiago, Chile	(Peru) José Guevara	(Canada) Ty Alexander Lindeman (Canada) Josephine Wu	10–21, 11–21	Bronze

=== Pan Am Championships ===
Women's doubles
Year	Venue	Partner	Opponent	Score	Result
2018	Teodoro Palacios Flores Gymnasium; Guatemala City, Guatemala	(Peru) Paula la Torre	(Canada) Rachel Honderich (Canada) Kristen Tsai	10–21, 12–21	Bronze

=== South American Games ===
Women's singles
Year	Venue	Opponent	Score	Result
2018	Evo Morales Coliseum; Cochabamba, Bolivia	(Brazil) Fabiana Silva	16–21, 13–21	Bronze
2022	Estadio León Condou; Asunción, Paraguay	(Brazil) Sâmia Lima	16–21, 18–21	Bronze
2026	Instituto Superior de Educación Física N° 11, Rosario, Santa Fe, Argentina	(Peru) Juliana Vieira	15–21, 18–21	Silver

Women's doubles
Year	Venue	Partner	Opponent	Score	Result
2018	Evo Morales Coliseum; Cochabamba, Bolivia	(Peru) Paula la Torre	(Brazil) Luana Vicente (Brazil) Fabiana Silva	9–21, 11–21	Bronze
2022	Estadio León Condou; Asunción, Paraguay	(Peru) Paula la Torre	(Brazil) Sânia Lima (Brazil) Juliana Vieira	14–21, 16–21	Bronze
2026	Instituto Superior de Educación Física N° 11; Rosario, Santa Fe, Argentina	(Peru) Rafaela Munar	(Brazil) Sânia Lima (Brazil) Juliana Vieira	8–21, 9–21	Bronze

=== South American Championships ===
Women's singles
Year	Venue	Opponent	Score	Result
2018	Polideportivo 2 de la Videna; Lima, Peru	(Peru) Fernanda Saponara	11–21, 11–21	Bronze
2019	Coliseo Abel Jimenez Parra; Guayaquil, Ecuador	(Peru) Daniela Macías	11–21, 14–21	Bronze
2020	Polideportivo 2 de la Videna; Lima, Peru	(Peru) Daniela Macías	17–21, 17–21	Silver
2022	Polideportivo 2 de la Videna; Lima, Peru	(Peru) Fernanda Saponara	21–13, 19–21, 22–20	Gold

Women's doubles
Year	Venue	Partner	Opponent	Score	Result
2018	Polideportivo 2 de la Videna; Lima, Peru	(Peru) Paula la Torre	(Peru) Daniela Macías (Peru) Dánica Nishimura	13–21, 16–21	Bronze
2019	Coliseo Abel Jimenez Parra; Guayaquil, Ecuador	(Peru) Inés Mendoza	(Brazil) Monaliza Feitosa (Brazil) Lorena Vieira	21–12, 18–21, 12–21	Bronze
2020	Polideportivo 2 de la Videna; Lima, Peru	(Peru) Paula la Torre	(Peru) Daniela Macías (Peru) Dánica Nishimura	19–21, 10–21	Silver
2022	Polideportivo 2 de la Videna; Lima, Peru	(Peru) Paula la Torre	(Brazil) Bianca Lima (Brazil) Lohaynny Vicente	21–14, 14–21, 20–22	Bronze

Mixed doubles
Year	Venue	Partner	Opponent	Score	Result
2019	Coliseo Abel Jimenez Parra; Guayaquil, Ecuador	(Peru) José Guevara	(Peru) Daniel la Torre (Peru) Daniela Macías	18–21, 24–22, 13–21	Bronze
2022	Polideportivo 2 de la Videna; Lima, Peru	(Peru) José Guevara	(Peru) Diego Mini (Peru) Paula la Torre	23–21, 19–21, 21–18	Gold

=== Bolivarian Games ===
Women's singles
Year	Venue	Opponent	Score	Result
2022	Coliseo Arena de Sal; Valledupar, Colombia	(Colombia) Maria Pérez	21–11, 21–19	Gold

Women's doubles
Year	Venue	Partner	Opponent	Score	Result
2017	Coliseo Colegio Cooedumag; Santa Marta, Colombia	(Peru) Paula la Torre	(Dominican Republic) Nairoby Jiménez (Dominican Republic) Licelott Sánchez	16–21, 16–21	Bronze
2022	Coliseo Arena de Sal; Valledupar, Colombia	(Peru) Paula la Torre	(Peru) Namie Miyahira (Peru) Fernanda Saponara	16–21, 21–18, 21–17	Gold

Mixed doubles
Year	Venue	Partner	Opponent	Score	Result
2022	Coliseo Arena de Sal; Valledupar, Colombia	(Peru) José Guevara	(El Salvador) Javier Alas (El Salvador) Fátima Centeno	21–18, 13–21, 21–13	Gold

=== Junior Pan American Games ===
Girls' singles
Year	Venue	Opponent	Score	Result
2021	Pacific Valley Events Center; Yumbo, Valle, Colombia	(United States) Natalie Chi	17–21, 16–21	Bronze

=== Pan Am Junior Championships ===
Girls' doubles
Year	Venue	Partner	Opponent	Score	Result
2016	CAR lla Videna; Lima, Peru	(Peru) Paula la Torre	(Brazil) Jackeline Luz (Brazil) Amanda Santos	15–21, 20–22	Bronze

=== BWF International Challenge/Series (12 titles, 16 runners-up) ===
Women's singles
Year	Tournament	Opponent	Score	Result
2020	Internacional Mexicano	(Mexico) Sabrina Solís	20–22, 8–21	(silver) Runner-up
2023	Giraldilla International	(Bulgaria) Hristomira Popovska	16–21, 21–16, 20–22	(silver) Runner-up
2023	Chile International	(Italy) Yasmine Hamza	16–21, 10–21	(silver) Runner-up
2023	Perú Future Series	(Peru) Fernanda Saponara	21–10, 21–11	(gold) Winner
2023	Lagos International	(United States) Lauren Lam	Walkover	(gold) Winner
2023	Peru Challenge	(Japan) Kaoru Sugiyama	3–21, 6–21	(silver) Runner-up
2023	Venezuela International	(Italy) Yasmine Hamza	21–12, 21–18	(gold) Winner
2023	Peru International Series	(Italy) Yasmine Hamza	19–21, 21–15, 21–9	(gold) Winner
2024	Suriname International	(Mexico) Sabrina Solís	21–15, 21–16	(gold) Winner
2025	Perú International	(Brazil) Juliana Vieira	15–8, 8–15, 6–15	(silver) Runner-up
2025	La Perla del Otun	(Colombia) Juliana Giraldo	21–19, 24–22	(gold) Winner
2025	Venezuela International	(Mexico) Sabrina Solís	21–10, 21–13	(gold) Winner
2026	Cuba International	(United States) Ishika Jaiswal	10–21, 6–21	(silver) Runner-up
2026	Perú Future Series	(Peru) Naomi Junco	21–13, 21–12	(gold) Winner
2026	Jamaica International	(United States) Disha Gupta	22–20, 17–6 (Retired)	(gold) Winner
2026	Suriname International	(Azerbaijan) Keisha Fatimah Azzahra	19–21, 22–20, 14–21	(silver) Runner-up

Women's doubles
Year	Tournament	Partner	Opponent	Score	Result
2017	Peru International Series	(Peru) Paula la Torre	(Peru) Daniela Macias (Peru) Dánica Nishimura	12–21, 10–21	(silver) Runner-up
2018	Jamaica International	(Peru) Paula la Torre	(United States) Jamie Hsu (United States) Jamie Subandhi	15–21, 8–21	(silver) Runner-up
2018	Perú Future Series	(Peru) Paula la Torre	(Peru) Daniela Macías (Peru) Dánica Nishimura	16–21, 10–21	(silver) Runner-up
2018	Peru International	(Peru) Paula la Torre	(Peru) Daniela Macías (Peru) Dánica Nishimura	11–21, 10–21	(silver) Runner-up
2019	Giraldilla International	(Peru) Paula la Torre	(Peru) Daniela Macías (Peru) Dánica Nishimura	9–21, 11–21	(silver) Runner-up
2020	Perú Future Series	(Peru) Paula la Torre	(Peru) Daniela Macías (Peru) Dánica Nishimura	19–21, 22–20, 19–21	(silver) Runner-up
2023	Perú Future Series	(Peru) Paula la Torre	(Peru) Fernanda Munar (Peru) Rafaela Munar	21–14, 21–14	(gold) Winner
2024	Suriname International	(Peru) Namie Miyahira	(Trinidad and Tobago) Chequeda de Boulet (Guyana) Priyanna Ramdhani	21–16, 21–12	(gold) Winner

Mixed doubles
Year	Tournament	Partner	Opponent	Score	Result
2017	Carebaco International	(Peru) Bruno Barrueto Deza	(Peru) Daniel la Torre Regal (Peru) Dánica Nishimura	16–21, 9–21	(silver) Runner-up
2019	Giraldilla International	(Peru) José Guevara	(Peru) Mario Cuba (Peru) Daniela Macías	12–21, 19–21	(silver) Runner-up
2023	Perú Future Series	(Peru) José Guevara	(Peru) Diego Mini (Peru) Paula la Torre	17–21, 13–21	(silver) Runner-up
2023	Lagos International	(Peru) José Guevara	(Slovenia) Miha Ivančič (Slovenia) Petra Polanc	21–17, 21–15	(gold) Winner

BWF International Challenge tournament
BWF International Series tournament
BWF Future Series tournament
