= 2022 South American Badminton Championships =

Tournament details
- Dates: 9–12 December
- Edition: 17th
- Venue: Polideportivo 2 de la Videna
- Location: Lima, Peru

The 2022 South American Badminton Championships (Spanish: Campeonato Sudamericano Adulto de Badminton 2022) was a badminton tournament sanctioned by the South American Badminton Confederation and Badminton Pan America. The individual and mixed team events were held from 9 to 12 December 2022.

The tournament was held at Polideportivo 2 de la Videna located in San Luis, Lima, Peru. Five countries took part in the tournament.

Only three teams competed in the team event. Therefore, the team event was played in a round-robin format. Hosts Peru won the title after winning against Brazil and Chile.

== Medal summary ==
=== Medalists ===
Event	Gold	Silver	Bronze
Men's singles	(Brazil) Donnians Oliveira	(Brazil) Waleson dos Santos	(Brazil) Alisson Vasconcellos
Men's singles	(Brazil) Donnians Oliveira	(Brazil) Waleson dos Santos	(Peru) Sharum Durand
Women's singles	(Peru) Inés Castillo	(Peru) Fernanda Saponara	(Brazil) Jackeline Luz
Women's singles	(Peru) Inés Castillo	(Peru) Fernanda Saponara	(Peru) Namie Miyahira
Men's doubles	(Peru) José Guevara (Peru) Diego Mini	(Brazil) Waleson dos Santos (Brazil) Marcos Sousa	(Brazil) Mateus Cutti (Brazil) Alisson Vasconcellos
Men's doubles	(Peru) José Guevara (Peru) Diego Mini	(Brazil) Waleson dos Santos (Brazil) Marcos Sousa	(Brazil) Vinicius Gori (Brazil) Welton Menezes
Women's doubles	(Brazil) Bianca Lima (Brazil) Lohaynny Vicente	(Peru) Namie Miyahira (Peru) Fernanda Saponara	(Peru) Inés Castillo (Peru) Paula la Torre
Women's doubles	(Brazil) Bianca Lima (Brazil) Lohaynny Vicente	(Peru) Namie Miyahira (Peru) Fernanda Saponara	(Peru) Talli Chomchey (Peru) Mirei Moromisato
Mixed doubles	(Peru) José Guevara (Peru) Inés Castillo	(Peru) Diego Mini (Peru) Paula la Torre	(Brazil) Rafael Faria (Brazil) Thayse Cruz
Mixed doubles	(Peru) José Guevara (Peru) Inés Castillo	(Peru) Diego Mini (Peru) Paula la Torre	(Peru) Diego Subauste (Peru) Fernanda Saponara
Mixed team	Peru; Remo Blondet; Alejandro Chueca; Sharum Durand; José Guevara; Diego Mini; Santiago de la Oliva; Brian Roque; Diego Subauste; Daniel la Torre; Adriano Viale; Inés Castillo; Namie Miyahira; Mirei Moromisato; Fernanda Munar; Rafaela Munar; Ariane Nakasone; Fernanda Saponara; Paula la Torre	Brazil; Gabriel Cury; Mateus Cutti; Rafael Faria; Vinicius Gori; Welton Menezes; João Marcos Moreira; Donnians Oliveira; Marcelo Bosa de Oliveira; Marcos Ryan; Waleson dos Santos; Alisson Vasconcellos; Thayse Cruz; Marta Freitas; Sayane Lima; Jackeline Luz; Bianca Lima; Geisa Oliveira; Karen de Oliveira; Rosalina de Souza; Lohaynny Vicente; Juliana Vieira	Chile; Benjamín Bahamondez; Alonso Medel; Nicolas Monne; Fernando Sanhueza; Sebastián Vásquez; Ashley Montre; Camila Astorga; Rosa Quilodrán; Valentina Vasquez; Vania Diaz

=== Medal table ===
* Host nation (Peru)

Rank	Nation	Gold	Silver	Bronze	Total
1	Peru*	4	3	5	12
2	Brazil	2	3	5	10
3	Chile	0	0	1	1
Totals (3 entries)		6	6	11	23

== Team event ==
=== Round robin ===
Pos	Team	Pld	W	L	MF	MA	MD	GF	GA	GD	PF	PA	PD	Pts	Qualification
1	Peru (H)	2	2	0	8	2	+6	16	6	+10	432	331	+101	2	Champions
2	Brazil	2	1	1	6	4	+2	14	8	+6	399	344	+55	1	Runners-up
3	Chile	2	0	2	1	9	−8	2	18	−16	249	405	−156	0	Third place

Source: TS
(H) Host

Brazil
5
Polideportivo 2 de la Videna, Court 1
13 December 2022, 09:30 UTC−5

Chile
0

			1	2	3
1	(Brazil) (Chile)	Marcos Ryan / Waleson dos Santos; Benjamín Bahamondez / Alonso Medel	21; 17	21; 9
2	(Brazil) (Chile)	Sayane Regina Lima; Ashley Montre	21; 13	21; 11
3	(Brazil) (Chile)	Donnians Oliveira; Fernando Sanhueza	21; 9	21; 3
4	(Brazil) (Chile)	Bianca de Oliveira Lima / Lohaynny Vicente; Rosa Quilodrán / Valentina Vasquez	21; 9	21; 15
5	(Brazil) (Chile)	Waleson dos Santos / Sayane Regina Lima; Alonso Medel / Ashley Montre	21; 11	21; 10

Peru
4
Polideportivo 2 de la Videna, Court 1
14 December 2022, 15:00 UTC−5

Chile
1

			1	2	3
1	(Peru) (Chile)	Remo Blondet; Alonso Medel	12; 21	15; 21
2	(Peru) (Chile)	Inés Castillo; Ashley Montre	21; 15	21; 9
3	(Peru) (Chile)	José Guevara / Diego Subauste; Benjamín Bahamondez / Alonso Medel	21; 14	21; 11
4	(Peru) (Chile)	Mirei Moromisato / Fernanda Saponara; Ashley Montre / Valentina Vasquez	21; 16	21; 17
5	(Peru) (Chile)	Diego Mini / Paula la Torre Regal; Fernando Sanhueza / Rosa Quilodrán	15; 7	15; 11

Brazil
1
Polideportivo 2 de la Videna, Court 1
13 December 2022, 09:30 UTC−5

Peru
4

			1	2	3
1	(Brazil) (Peru)	Marcos Ryan / Sayane Regina Lima; Diego Mini / Paula la Torre Regal	16; 21	21; 16	9; 21
2	(Brazil) (Peru)	Donnians Oliveira; Adriano Viale	21; 16	22; 20
3	(Brazil) (Peru)	Jackeline Luz; Fernanda Munar	8; 21	10; 21
4	(Brazil) (Peru)	Marcos Ryan / Waleson dos Santos; José Guevara / Diego Mini	15; 21	21; 17	18; 21
5	(Brazil) (Peru)	Sayane Regina Lima / Lohaynny Vicente; Inés Castillo / Paula la Torre Regal	11; 21	17; 21
