= Fabrício Farias =

Brazilian badminton player (born 2000)

Personal information
- Born: Fabrício Ruan Rocha Farias; 8 May 2000 (age 26) Teresina, Brazil
- Height: 1.83 m (6 ft 0 in)

Sport
- Country: Brazil
- Sport: Badminton
- Handedness: Right

Men's & mixed doubles
- Highest ranking: 51 (MD with Davi Silva, 27 October 2026); 57 (MD with Francielton Farias 10 March 2020); 39 (XD with Jaqueline Lima 31 January 2023)
- Current ranking: 53 (MD with Davi Silva); 55 (XD with Jaqueline Lima) (3 November 2026)
- BWF profile
Medal record
Men's badminton
Representing Brazil
Pan American Games
| Silver medal – second place | 2023 Santiago | Men's doubles |
| Bronze medal – third place | 2019 Lima | Men's doubles |
| Bronze medal – third place | 2019 Lima | Mixed doubles |
Pan American Championships
| Silver medal – second place | 2019 Aguascalientes | Mixed doubles |
| Silver medal – second place | 2025 Lima | Men's doubles |
| Bronze medal – third place | 2023 Kingston | Mixed doubles |
| Bronze medal – third place | 2024 Guatemala City | Mixed doubles |
| Bronze medal – third place | 2025 Lima | Mixed doubles |
| Bronze medal – third place | 2026 Lima | Men's doubles |
| Bronze medal – third place | 2026 Lima | Mixed doubles |
Pan Am Mixed Team Championships
| Silver medal – second place | 2017 Santo Domingo | Mixed team |
| Bronze medal – third place | 2019 Lima | Mixed team |
| Bronze medal – third place | 2023 Guadalajara | Mixed team |
| Bronze medal – third place | 2025 Aguascalientes | Mixed team |
Pan Am Male Cup
| Silver medal – second place | 2022 Acapulco | Men's team |
| Silver medal – second place | 2024 São Paulo | Men's team |
| Bronze medal – third place | 2026 Guatemala City | Men's team |
South American Games
| Gold medal – first place | 2022 Asunción | Men's doubles |
| Gold medal – first place | 2022 Asunción | Mixed doubles |
| Gold medal – first place | 2022 Asunción | Mixed team |
| Gold medal – first place | 2026 Santa Fe | Men's doubles |
| Gold medal – first place | 2026 Santa Fe | Mixed team |
| Silver medal – second place | 2026 Santa Fe | Mixed doubles |
Pan Am Junior Championships
| Gold medal – first place | 2017 Markham | Men's doubles |
| Silver medal – second place | 2015 Tijuana | Mixed team |
| Silver medal – second place | 2016 Lima | Mixed team |
| Silver medal – second place | 2017 Markham | Mixed doubles |
| Silver medal – second place | 2018 Salvador | Mixed team |
| Bronze medal – third place | 2017 Markham | Mixed team |

Fabrício Ruan Rocha Farias (born 8 May 2000) is a Brazilian badminton player from Joca Claudino Esportes badminton club. He won the bronze medals at the 2019 Pan American Games in the men's doubles with his brother, Francielton Farias, and also in the mixed doubles with Jaqueline Lima. He later claimed the silver medal in the men's doubles at the 2023 Pan American Games with Davi Silva.

Farias and Lima were also the silver medalists in mixed doubles at the 2019 Pan Am Badminton Championships. Farias is a former Pan Am Junior champion in the boys' doubles.

== Achievements ==
=== Pan American Games ===
Men's doubles
| Year | Venue | Partner | Opponent | Score | Result |
|---|---|---|---|---|---|
| 2019 | Polideportivo 3 Lima, Peru | (Brazil) Francielton Farias | (United States) Phillip Chew (United States) Ryan Chew | 22–20, 13–21, 17–21 | Bronze |
| 2023 | Olympic Training Center, Santiago, Chile | (Brazil) Davi Silva | (Canada) Adam Dong (Canada) Nyl Yakura | 21–19, 15–21, 18–21 | Silver |

Mixed doubles
| Year | Venue | Partner | Opponent | Score | Result |
|---|---|---|---|---|---|
| 2019 | Polideportivo 3 Lima, Peru | (Brazil) Jaqueline Lima | (Canada) Joshua Hurlburt-Yu (Canada) Josephine Wu | 22–20, 17–21, 13–21 | Bronze |

=== Pan Am Championships ===
Men's doubles
| Year | Venue | Partner | Opponent | Score | Result |
|---|---|---|---|---|---|
| 2025 | Videna Poli 2, Lima, Peru | (Brazil) Davi Silva | (United States) Chen Zhi-yi (United States) Presley Smith | 16–21, 6–21 | Silver |
| 2026 | High Performance Center VIDENA, Lima, Peru | (Brazil) Davi Silva | (United States) Chen Zhi-yi (United States) Presley Smith | 12–21, 18–21 | Bronze |

Mixed doubles
| Year | Venue | Partner | Opponent | Score | Result |
|---|---|---|---|---|---|
| 2019 | Gimnasio Olímpico, Aguascalientes, Mexico | (Brazil) Jaqueline Lima | (Canada) Joshua Hurlburt-Yu (Canada) Josephine Wu | 14–21, 19–21 | Silver |
| 2023 | G.C. Foster College of Physical Education and Sport, Kingston, Jamaica | (Brazil) Jaqueline Lima | (Canada) Ty Alexander Lindeman (Canada) Josephine Wu | 21–23, 20–22 | Bronze |
| 2024 | Teodoro Palacios Flores Gymnasium, Guatemala City, Guatemala | (Brazil) Jaqueline Lima | (United States) Vinson Chiu (United States) Jennie Gai | 15–21, 19–21 | Bronze |
| 2025 | Videna Poli 2, Lima, Peru | (Brazil) Jaqueline Lima | (Canada) Jonathan Lai (Canada) Crystal Lai | 17–21, 21–15, 19–21 | Bronze |
| 2026 | High Performance Center VIDENA, Lima, Peru | (Brazil) Jaqueline Lima | (United States) Presley Smith (United States) Jennie Gai | 14–21, 10–21 | Bronze |

=== South American Games ===
Men's doubles
| Year | Venue | Partner | Opponent | Score | Result |
|---|---|---|---|---|---|
| 2022 | Estadio León Condou; Asunción, Paraguay | (Brazil) Davi Silva | (Peru) Daniel la Torre Regal (Peru) Diego Subauste | 21–17, 21–13 | Gold |
| 2026 | Instituto Superior de Educación Física N° 11; Rosario, Santa Fe, Argentina | (Brazil) Davi Silva | (Brazil) Jonathan Matias (Brazil) Donnians Oliveira | 21–15, 21–12 | Gold |

Mixed doubles
| Year | Venue | Partner | Opponent | Score | Result |
|---|---|---|---|---|---|
| 2022 | Estadio León Condou; Asunción, Paraguay | (Brazil) Jaqueline Lima | (Brazil) Davi Silva (Brazil) Sânia Lima | 26–24, 21–12 | Gold |
| 2026 | Instituto Superior de Educación Física N° 11; Rosario, Santa Fe, Argentina | (Brazil) Jaqueline Lima | (Brazil) Davi Silva (Brazil) Sânia Lima | 18–21, 16–21 | Silver |

=== Pan Am Junior Championships ===
Boys' doubles
| Year | Venue | Partner | Opponent | Score | Result |
|---|---|---|---|---|---|
| 2017 | Markham Pan Am Centre; Markham, Canada | (Brazil) Waleson Santos | (Guatemala) Christopher Salvador (Peru) Diego Mini | 21–11, 21–17 | Gold |

Mixed doubles
| Year | Venue | Partner | Opponent | Score | Result |
|---|---|---|---|---|---|
| 2017 | Markham Pan Am Centre; Markham, Canada | (Brazil) Sâmia Lima | (Canada) Brian Yang (Canada) Katie Ho-Shue | 14–21, 11–21 | Silver |

=== BWF International Challenge/Series (21 titles, 17 runners-up) ===
Men's singles
| Year | Tournament | Opponent | Score | Result |
|---|---|---|---|---|
| 2018 | Argentina International | (Italy) Giovanni Toti | 21–19, 21–18 | (gold) Winner |

Men's doubles
| Year | Tournament | Partner | Opponent | Score | Result |
|---|---|---|---|---|---|
| 2018 | Mexican Open | (Brazil) Francielton Farias | (Mexico) Andrés López (Mexico) Luis Montoya | 21–15, 24–22 | (gold) Winner |
| 2019 | Peru International | (Brazil) Francielton Farias | (Guatemala) Rubén Castellanos (Guatemala) Aníbal Marroquín | 20–22, 17–21 | (silver) Runner-up |
| 2019 | Brazil Future Series | (Brazil) Francielton Farias | (Argentina) Nicolas Oliva (Argentina) Santiago Otero | 21–15, 21–15 | (gold) Winner |
| 2019 | Guatemala International | (Brazil) Francielton Farias | (Mexico) Job Castillo (Mexico) Luis Montoya | 21–17, 21–10 | (gold) Winner |
| 2019 | Brazil International | (Brazil) Francielton Farias | (Brazil) Waleson Santos (Brazil) Matheus Voigt | 21–12, 21–11 | (gold) Winner |
| 2019 | Santo Domingo Open | (Brazil) Francielton Farias | (Cuba) Leodannis Martínez (Cuba) Osleni Guerrero | 19–21, 16–21 | (silver) Runner-up |
| 2021 | Brazil International | (Brazil) Francielton Farias | (Brazil) Izak Batalha (Brazil) Artur Pomoceno | 21–18, 21–10 | (gold) Winner |
| 2021 | Dominican Open | (Brazil) Francielton Farias | (Brazil) Izak Batalha (Brazil) Artur Pomoceno | 21–16, 21–12 | (gold) Winner |
| 2022 | Brazil International | (Brazil) Francielton Farias | (Guatemala) Jonathan Solís (Guatemala) Aníbal Marroquín | 21–12, 21–17 | (gold) Winner |
| 2023 | Santo Domingo Open | (Brazil) Davi Silva | (Mexico) Job Castillo (Mexico) Luis Montoya | 21–23, 21–15, 19–21 | (silver) Runner-up |
| 2023 | Brazil International | (Brazil) Davi Silva | (Algeria) Koceila Mammeri (Algeria) Youcef Sabri Medel | 16–21, 18–21 | (silver) Runner-up |
| 2023 | Guatemala International | (Brazil) Davi Silva | (Canada) Kevin Lee (Canada) Ty Alexander Lindeman | 18–21, 14–21 | (silver) Runner-up |
| 2024 | Perú International Series | (Brazil) Davi Silva | (Brazil) Izak Batalha (Brazil) Matheus Voigt | 16–21, 17–21 | (silver) Runner-up |
| 2024 | El Salvador International | (Brazil) Davi Silva | (Brazil) João Mendonça (Brazil) Kauan Sttocco | 21–14, 21–15 | (gold) Winner |
| 2025 | Perú International | (Brazil) Davi Silva | (Brazil) Izak Batalha (Brazil) Matheus Voigt | 15–12, 15–10 | (gold) Winner |
| 2025 | Guatemala International | (Brazil) Davi Silva | (Canada) Kevin Lee (Canada) Ty Alexander Lindeman | 11–21, 22–20, 21–17 | (gold) Winner |
| 2026 | Guatemala International | (Brazil) Davi Silva | (Canada) Kevin Lee (Canada) Ty Alexander Lindeman | 12–21, 17–21 | (silver) Runner-up |
| 2026 | Arise International | (Brazil) Davi Silva | (Canada) Kevin Lee (Canada) Ty Alexander Lindeman | 21–15, 11–21, 20–22 | (silver) Runner-up |
| 2026 | Peru International | (Brazil) Davi Silva | (Canada) Kevin Lee (Canada) Ty Alexander Lindeman | 21–18, 18–21, 21–15 | (gold) Winner |

Mixed doubles
| Year | Tournament | Partner | Opponent | Score | Result |
|---|---|---|---|---|---|
| 2018 | North Harbour International | (Brazil) Jaqueline Lima | (New Zealand) Maika Phillips (New Zealand) Anona Pak | 6–21, 25–27 | (silver) Runner-up |
| 2018 | Argentina International | (Brazil) Jaqueline Lima | (United States) Ricky Liuzhou (United States) Angela Zhang | 21–19, 21–15 | (gold) Winner |
| 2018 | Santo Domingo Open | (Brazil) Jaqueline Lima | (Canada) Joshua Hurlburt-Yu (Canada) Josephine Wu | 17–21, 21–16, 20–22 | (silver) Runner-up |
| 2019 | Peru International | (Brazil) Jaqueline Lima | (United States) Howard Shu (United States) Paula Lynn Obañana | 17–21, 20–22 | (silver) Runner-up |
| 2019 | Brazil Future Series | (Brazil) Jaqueline Lima | (Brazil) Artur Pomoceno (Brazil) Sâmia Lima | 21–17, 21–16 | (gold) Winner |
| 2019 | Carebaco International | (Brazil) Jaqueline Lima | (United States) Vinson Chiu (United States) Breanna Chi | 16–21, 14–21 | (silver) Runner-up |
| 2019 | International Mexicano | (Brazil) Jaqueline Lima | (Mexico) Luis Montoya (Mexico) Vanessa Villalobos | 19–21, 19–21 | (silver) Runner-up |
| 2019 | Guatemala International | (Brazil) Jaqueline Lima | (Guatemala) Jonathan Solís (Guatemala) Diana Corleto | Walkover | (gold) Winner |
| 2019 | Brazil International | (Brazil) Jaqueline Lima | (Brazil) Francielton Farias (Brazil) Sâmia Lima | 21–18, 21–18 | (gold) Winner |
| 2019 | Santo Domingo Open | (Brazil) Jaqueline Lima | (Brazil) Francielton Farias (Brazil) Sâmia Lima | 21–16, 21–16 | (gold) Winner |
| 2021 | Brazil International | (Brazil) Jaqueline Lima | (Brazil) Artur Pomoceno (Brazil) Sâmia Lima | 21–19, 21–12 | (gold) Winner |
| 2021 | Dominican Open | (Brazil) Jaqueline Lima | (Brazil) Artur Pomoceno (Brazil) Sâmia Lima | 24–22, 21–19 | (gold) Winner |
| 2022 | Perú International Series | (Brazil) Jaqueline Lima | (Brazil) Davi Silva (Brazil) Sania Lima | 21–19, 19–21, 21–15 | (gold) Winner |
| 2024 | Perú International Series | (Brazil) Jaqueline Lima | (Mexico) Luis Montoya (Mexico) Miriam Rodríguez | 15–21, 21–17, 18–21 | (silver) Runner-up |
| 2024 | El Salvador International | (Brazil) Jaqueline Lima | (Brazil) Davi Silva (Brazil) Sania Lima | 24–26, 21–15, 19–21 | (silver) Runner-up |
| 2024 | Canadian International | (Brazil) Jaqueline Lima | (Brazil) Davi Silva (Brazil) Sania Lima | 21–16, 21–19 | (gold) Winner |
| 2025 | Perú International | (Brazil) Jaqueline Lima | (Brazil) Davi Silva (Brazil) Sania Lima | 11–15, 13–15 | (silver) Runner-up |
| 2026 | Brazil International | (Brazil) Jaqueline Lima | (Brazil) Davi Silva (Brazil) Sania Lima | 21–16, 19–21, 12–21 | (silver) Runner-up |

BWF International Challenge tournament
BWF International Series tournament
BWF Future Series tournament
