= Canadian International (badminton) =

Badminton championship held in Canada

The Canadian International in badminton is an international open held in Canada.

== Previous winners ==
Year	Men's singles	Women's singles	Men's doubles	Women's doubles	Mixed doubles	Ref
2008	(Japan) Shoji Sato	(China) Tai Yi	(Japan) Keishi Kawaguchi (Japan) Naoki Kawamae	(Japan) Reika Kakiiwa (Japan) Mizuki Fujii	(Chinese Taipei) Chen Hung-ling (Chinese Taipei) Chou Chia-chi	
2009	(England) Rajiv Ouseph	(Japan) Nozomi Kametani	(Japan) Naoki Kawamae (Japan) Shoji Sato	(Japan) Aki Akao (Japan) Yasuyo Imabeppu	(Canada) Kevin Cao (Canada) Melody Liang	
2010	(Lithuania) Kęstutis Navickas	(Japan) Hitomi Oka	(Netherlands) Ruud Bosch (Netherlands) Koen Ridder	(Germany) Nicole Grether (Canada) Charmaine Reid	(Canada) Toby Ng (Canada) Grace Gao	
2011	(England) Carl Baxter	(Canada) Michelle Li	(Canada) Adrian Liu (Canada) Derrick Ng	(Canada) Alex Bruce (Canada) Michelle Li	(Canada) Toby Ng (Canada) Grace Gao	
2012	No competition					
2013	(Netherlands) Eric Pang	(Canada) Michelle Li	(Chinese Taipei) Hsu Jui-ting (Chinese Taipei) Tien Jen-chieh	(United States) Eva Lee (United States) Paula Lynn Obañana	(England) Nathan Robertson (England) Jenny Wallwork	
2014– 2019	No competition					
2020	Cancelled (Note: This tournament, originally to be played from 31 March to 5 April, was later cancelled due to the COVID-19 pandemic in Canada.)					
2021	Cancelled (Note: This tournament, originally to be played from 10–14 February, was later cancelled due to the COVID-19 pandemic in Canada.)					
2022	(Japan) Takuma Obayashi	(Canada) Michelle Li	(Denmark) Rasmus Kjær (Denmark) Frederik Søgaard	(United States) Annie Xu (United States) Kerry Xu	(Denmark) Mathias Thyrri (Denmark) Amalie Magelund	
2023	(Canada) Brian Yang	(Canada) Wenyu Zhang	(Malaysia) Mohamad Arif Abdul Latif (Canada) Jonathan Lai	(Canada) Jacqueline Cheung (Canada) Rachel Honderich	(Indonesia) Rian Agung Saputro (Indonesia) Serena Kani	
2024	(Canada) Brian Yang	(Brazil) Juliana Viana Vieira	(United States) Chen Zhi Yi (United States) Presley Smith	(Chinese Taipei) Lin Wan-ching (Chinese Taipei) Liu Chiao-yun	(Brazil) Fabrício Farias (Brazil) Jaqueline Lima	
2025	(Canada) Victor Lai	(Canada) Michelle Li	(United States) Chen Zhi Yi (United States) Presley Smith	(Canada) Jackie Dent (Canada) Crystal Lai	(Canada) Timothy Lock (Canada) Chloe Hoang	
2026						

== Performance by nations ==
As of the 2025 edition

Pos	Nation	MS	WS	MD	WD	XD	Total
1	Canada	3	5	1.5	3.5	4	17
2	Japan	2	2	2	2	0	8
3	United States	0	0	2	2	0	4
4	Chinese Taipei	0	0	1	1	1	3
4	England	2	0	0	0	1	3
6	Brazil	0	1	0	0	1	2
6	Denmark	0	0	1	0	1	2
6	Netherlands	1	0	1	0	0	2
9	China	0	1	0	0	0	1
9	Indonesia	0	0	0	0	1	1
9	Lithuania	1	0	0	0	0	1
12	Germany	0	0	0	0.5	0	0.5
12	Malaysia	0	0	0.5	0	0	0.5
Total		9	9	9	9	9	45
