= Badminton at the 2026 South American Games =

Badminton competitions at the 2026 South American Games

- Venue: Instituto Superior de Educación Física N° 11
- Dates: September 21–26
- Competitors: 47 from 10 nations

Badminton competitions at the 2026 South American Games in Rosario, Santa Fe, and Rafaela, Argentina, were held between September 21 and 26 at Instituto Superior de Educación Física N° 11, located within Parque de la Independencia in Rosario.

A total of six events were contested (two men's, two women's and two mixed).

== Medal summary ==
=== Medal table ===
* Host nation (Argentina)

Rank	Nation	Gold	Silver	Bronze	Total
1	Brazil	6	4	0	10
2	Peru	0	2	5	7
3	Argentina*	0	0	2	2
3	Venezuela	0	0	2	2
5	Colombia	0	0	1	1
5	Paraguay	0	0	1	1
Totals (6 entries)		6	6	11	23

=== Medalists ===
==== Men ====
Event	Gold	Silver	Bronze
Singles	Jonathan Matias; Brazil	Donnians Oliveira; Brazil	Adriano Viale; Peru
Singles	Jonathan Matias; Brazil	Donnians Oliveira; Brazil	Nicolas Oliva; Argentina
Doubles	Brazil; Fabrício Farias; Davi Silva	Brazil; Jonathan Matias; Donnians Oliveira	Venezuela; Ricardo Torres; Jhonatan Wo Zheng
Doubles	Brazil; Fabrício Farias; Davi Silva	Brazil; Jonathan Matias; Donnians Oliveira	Peru; Guillermo Buendía; Sharum Durand

==== Women ====
Event	Gold	Silver	Bronze
Singles	Juliana Viana Vieira; Brazil	Inés Castillo; Peru	Namie Miyahira; Peru
Singles	Juliana Viana Vieira; Brazil	Inés Castillo; Peru	Juliana Giraldo; Colombia
Doubles	Brazil; Juliana Viana Vieira; Sânia Lima	Brazil; Yasmim de Abreu; Jaqueline Lima	Peru; Inés Castillo; Rafaela Munar
Doubles	Brazil; Juliana Viana Vieira; Sânia Lima	Brazil; Yasmim de Abreu; Jaqueline Lima	Paraguay; Paula Rodas; Sofía Rodas

==== Mixed ====
Event	Gold	Silver	Bronze
Doubles	Brazil; Davi Silva; Sânia Lima	Brazil; Fabrício Farias; Jaqueline Lima	Peru; José Guevara; Namie Miyahira
Doubles	Brazil; Davi Silva; Sânia Lima	Brazil; Fabrício Farias; Jaqueline Lima	Venezuela; Mariangel García; Jhonatan Wo Zheng
Teams	Brazil; Donnians Oliveira; Davi Silva; Fabrício Farias; Jaqueline Lima; Jonathan Matias; Juliana Viana Vieira; Sânia Lima; Yasmim de Abreu	Peru; Rafaela Munar; Inés Castillo; Sofía Junco; José Guevara; Namie Miyahira; Adriano Viale; Sharum Durand; Guillermo Buendía	Argentina; Milena Oliva; Nicolas Oliva; Franco Motto; Ailén Oliva; Santiago Otero; Iona Gualdi

== Participation ==
Ten nations participated in the badminton events of the 2026 South American Games.

- Argentina (6)
- Bolivia (4)
- Brazil (8)
- Chile (2)
- Colombia (2)
- Ecuador (1)
- Paraguay (8)
- Peru (8)
- Suriname (2)
- Venezuela (6)

== Results ==
=== Men's singles ===
Round of 32
Thiago Acha (PAR)	21	21
Fabrizio Prudencio (BOL)	1	7
Jesus Rivero (VEN)	10	16
Santiago Otero (ARG)	21	21

Round of 16
Jonathan Matias (BRA)	21	21
Marcos Rotela (PAR)	7	4
Miguel Quirama (COL)	21	27
Rivano Bisphan (SUR)	11	25
Nicolas Oliva (ARG)	21	21
Ricardo Torres (VEN)	5	4
Sharum Durand (PER)	21	21
Thiago Acha (PAR)	15	16
Santiago Otero (ARG)	21	21
Gabriel Rosales (BOL)	5	5
Bruno Mora (CHI)	6	7
Adriano Viale (PER)	21	21
Franco Motto (ARG)	20	19
Ren Jie Lee (PAR)	22	21
Guillermo Buendía (PER)	10	7
Donnians Oliveira (BRA)	21	21

Quarterfinals
J Matias (BRA)	21	21
M Quirama (COL)	5	11
N Oliva (ARG)	21	21
S Durand (PER)	15	15
S Otero (ARG)	10	13
A Viale (PER)	21	21
RJ Lee (PAR)	13	15
D Oliveira (BRA)	21	21

Semifinals
J Matias (BRA)	21	21
N Oliva (ARG)	18	11
A Viale (PER)	8	24
D Oliveira (BRA)	21	26

Final
J Matias (BRA)	24	14	21
D Oliveira (BRA)	22	21	15

=== Men's doubles ===
Round of 16
Marcos Rotela (PAR); Mauricio Martínez (PAR)	12	14
Ricardo Torres (VEN); Jhonatan Wo Zheng (VEN)	21	21

Quarterfinals
Davi Silva (BRA); Fabrício Farias (BRA)	21	21
Nicolas Oliva (ARG); Santiago Otero (ARG)	14	10
Sharum Durand (PER); Guillermo Buendía (PER)	21	21
Ren Jie Lee (PAR); Thiago Acha (PAR)	16	19
Ricardo Torres (VEN); Jhonatan Wo Zheng (VEN)	21	21
Gabriel Rosales (BOL); Fabrizio Prudencio (BOL)	7	5
Donnians Oliveira (BRA); Jonathan Matias (BRA)	21	18	21
José Guevara (PER); Adriano Viale (PER)	15	21	17

Semifinals
D Silva (BRA); F Farias (BRA)	21	21
S Durand (PER); G Buendía (PER)	10	10
R Torres (VEN); J Wo Zheng (VEN)	8	12
D Oliveira (BRA); J Matias (BRA)	21	21

Final
D Silva (BRA); F Farias (BRA)	21	21
D Oliveira (BRA); J Matias (BRA)	15	12

=== Women's singles ===
Round of 32
Paula Rodas (PAR)	16	21	18
María Zambrano (ECU)	21	14	21
Juanita Siviora (BOL)	9	4
Mariangel García (VEN)	21	21
Milena Oliva (ARG)	9	11
Sofía Junco (PER)	21	21
Yasmim de Abreu (BRA)	21	15	19
Ashley Montre (CHI)	14	21	21

Round of 16
Juliana Vieira (BRA)	21	21
Imani Mangroe (SUR)	9	6
María Rojas (VEN)	9	17
María Zambrano (ECU)	21	21
Namie Miyahira (PER)	21	21
Brenda Garrido (PAR)	11	2
Ailén Oliva (ARG)	15^{r}
Mariangel García (VEN)	13	ret
Sofía Junco (PER)	21	21
Sofía Rodas (PAR)	8	10
Bárbara Lamas (VEN)	10	21	10
Juliana Giraldo (COL)	21	17	21
Ashley Montre (CHI)	21	21
Verónica Condori (BOL)	1	7
Iona Gualdi (ARG)	9	9
Inés Castillo (PER)	21	21

Quarterfinals
Juliana Vieira (BRA)	21	21
M Zambrano (ECU)	3	7
N Miyahira (PER)	21	21
M García (VEN)	10	13
S Junco (PER)	17	21	19
J Giraldo (COL)	21	13	21
A Montre (CHI)	11	12
I Castillo (PER)	21	21

Semifinals
Juliana Vieira (BRA)	21	21
N Miyahira (PER)	9	7
J Giraldo (COL)	15	15
I Castillo (PER)	21	21

Final
Juliana Vieira (BRA)	21	21
I Castillo (PER)	15	18

=== Women's doubles ===
Round of 16
Rafaela Munar (PER); Inés Castillo (PER)	21	21
Mariangel García (VEN); María Rojas (VEN)	14	14

Quarterfinals
Sofía Junco (PER); Namie Miyahira (PER)	15	14
Jaqueline Lima (BRA); Yasmim de Abreu (BRA)	21	21
Sofía Rodas (PAR); Paula Rodas (PAR)	21	21
Juanita Siviora (BOL); Verónica Condori (BOL)	1	6
Rafaela Munar (PER); Inés Castillo (PER)	wdn
Ailén Oliva (ARG); Iona Gualdi (ARG)
Brenda Garrido (PAR); Mara Garrido (PAR)	3	3
Juliana Vieira (BRA); Sânia Lima (BRA)	21	21

Semifinals
J Lima (BRA); Y de Abreu (BRA)	21	21
S Rodas (PAR); P Rodas (PAR)	9	17
R Munar (PER); I Castillo (PER)	8	9
Juliana Vieira (BRA); S Lima (BRA)	21	21

Final
J Lima (BRA); Y de Abreu (BRA)	10	13
Juliana Vieira (BRA); S Lima (BRA)	21	21

=== Mixed doubles ===
Round of 16
Nicolas Oliva (ARG); Ailén Oliva (ARG)	21	22
Jesus Rivero (VEN); María Rojas (VEN)	13	20
Juanita Siviora (BOL); Gabriel Rosales (BOL)	3	9
José Guevara (PER); Namie Miyahira (PER)	21	21
Paula Rodas (PAR); Ren Jie Lee (PAR)	21	21
Ashley Montre (CHI); Bruno Mora (CHI)	17	13
Mariangel García (VEN); Jhonatan Wo Zheng (VEN)	21	21
Verónica Condori (BOL); Fabrizio Prudencio (BOL)	7	7
Rivano Bisphan (SUR); Imani Mangroe (SUR)	7	22
Miguel Quirama (COL); Juliana Giraldo (COL)	21	24
Sofía Rodas (PAR); Thiago Acha (PAR)	5	11
Rafaela Munar (PER); Sharum Durand (PER)	21	21
Santiago Otero (ARG); Iona Gualdi (ARG)	9	10
Davi Silva (BRA); Sânia Lima (BRA)	21	21

Quarterfinals
Fabrício Farias (BRA); Jaqueline Lima (BRA)	WDN
Nicolas Oliva (ARG); Ailén Oliva (ARG)
José Guevara (PER); Namie Miyahira (PER)	21	21
Paula Rodas (PAR); Ren Jie Lee (PAR)	15	14
Mariangel García (VEN); Jhonatan Wo Zheng (VEN)	21	21
Miguel Quirama (COL); Juliana Giraldo (COL)	19	15
Rafaela Munar (PER); Sharum Durand (PER)	14	13
Davi Silva (BRA); Sânia Lima (BRA)	21	21

Semifinals
F Farias (BRA); J Lima (BRA)	21	21
J Guevara (PER); N Miyahira (PER)	14	9
M García (VEN); J Wo Zheng (VEN)	9	12
D Silva (BRA); S Lima (BRA)	21	21

Final
F Farias (BRA); J Lima (BRA)	18	16
D Silva (BRA); S Lima (BRA)	21	21

=== Mixed team ===
Group stage
Group A

Pos	Team	Pld	W	D	L	GF	GA	GD	Pts	Qualification
1	Brazil	2	2	0	0	10	0	+10	4	Qualification to knock-out stage
2	Argentina	2	1	0	1	3	7	−4	3	Qualification to knock-out stage
3	Paraguay	2	0	0	2	2	8	−6	2	

Group B

Pos	Team	Pld	W	D	L	GF	GA	GD	Pts	Qualification
1	Peru	2	2	0	0	10	0	+10	4	Qualification to knock-out stage
2	Venezuela	2	1	0	1	5	5	0	3	Qualification to knock-out stage
3	Bolivia	2	0	0	2	0	10	−10	2	

Knockout stage

Semifinals
Brazil	3
Venezuela	0
Peru	3
Argentina	0

Final
Brazil	3
Peru	0
Third place
Venezuela	0
Argentina	3
