= Juliana Viana Vieira =

Brazilian badminton player

Juliana Vieira
Personal information
- Born: Juliana Viana Vieira; 23 September 2004 (age 22) Teresina, Piauí, Brazil
- Height: 1.62 m (5 ft 4 in)

Sport
- Country: Brazil
- Sport: Badminton
- Handedness: Right

Women's singles & doubles
- Highest ranking: 46 (WS, 6 August 2024); 49 (WD, with Sânia Lima 23 January 2024)
- Current ranking: 55 (WS, 27 October 2026)
- BWF profile
Medal record
Women's badminton
Representing Brazil
Pan American Games
Bronze medal – third place	2023 Santiago	Women's doubles
Pan Am Championships
Gold medal – first place	2025 Lima	Women's singles
Pan Am Mixed Team Championships
Bronze medal – third place	2023 Guadalajara	Mixed team
Bronze medal – third place	2025 Aguascalientes	Mixed team
Pan Am Female Cup
Bronze medal – third place	2020 Salvador	Women's team
Bronze medal – third place	2022 Acapulco	Women's team
Bronze medal – third place	2024 São Paulo	Women's team
Bronze medal – third place	2026 Guatemala City	Women's team
South American Games
Gold medal – first place	2022 Asunción	Women's singles
Gold medal – first place	2022 Asunción	Women's doubles
Gold medal – first place	2022 Asunción	Mixed team
Gold medal – first place	2026 Santa Fe	Women's singles
Gold medal – first place	2026 Santa Fe	Women's doubles
Gold medal – first place	2026 Santa Fe	Mixed team
South American Championships
Gold medal – first place	2021 Joinville	Women's singles
Gold medal – first place	2021 Joinville	Mixed team
Junior Pan American Games
Gold medal – first place	2025 Asunción	Mixed doubles
Silver medal – second place	2025 Asunción	Girls' singles
Bronze medal – third place	2021 Cali–Valle	Girls' singles
Pan Am Junior Championships
Bronze medal – third place	2019 Moncton	Mixed team
Bronze medal – third place	2021 Acapulco	Mixed team
South American Youth Games
Gold medal – first place	2022 Rosario	Singles
Silver medal – second place	2022 Rosario	Doubles

Juliana Viana Vieira (born 23 September 2004) is a Brazilian badminton player. She made her Olympic debut at the 2024 Summer Olympics, competing in the women's singles event. Vieira is the first Brazilian woman to win the women's singles title at the Pan Am Championships, an achievement she secured in 2025. Her career also includes six gold medals at the 2022 and 2026 South American Games (in women's singles, women's doubles, and mixed team events), and a bronze medal in women's doubles at the 2023 Pan American Games.

== Career ==
In 2020, Juliana Vieira represented the Brazilian national team at the Pan Am Women's Team Championships, winning a bronze medal. In 2021, she secured a bronze medal at the Junior Pan American Games and won titles at the Brazil International and the Dominican Open.

In 2022, Vieira won women's singles titles at the Brazil International and the Peru International. She also competed at the South American Games, claiming gold medals in women's singles, women's doubles, and the mixed team events.

In 2023, Vieira won the women's singles title at the Santo Domingo Open, where she also secured the women's doubles title alongside Sânia Lima. She additionally won the El Salvador International and qualified for the World Championships. At the World Championships, she defeated Insyirah Khan of Singapore in the first round before being defeated by Pornpawee Chochuwong in the second round.

In 2024, Vieira qualified for the 2024 Summer Olympics women's singles event. In Group D, she was defeated by Supanida Katethong of Thailand. In her second match, she defeated Lo Sin Yan of Hong Kong, becoming the first Brazilian woman to win a badminton singles match at the Olympic Games.

In 2025, Vieira won the gold medal at the Pan Am Championships, becoming the first Brazilian woman to win the women's singles title at that tournament.

== Achievements ==
=== Pan American Games ===
Women's doubles
Year	Venue	Partner	Opponent	Score	Result
2023	Olympic Training Center; Santiago, Chile	(Brazil) Sânia Lima	(United States) Annie Xu (United States) Kerry Xu	7–21, 18–21	Bronze

=== Pan Am Championships ===
Women's singles
Year	Venue	Opponent	Score	Result
2025	Videna Poli 2, Lima, Peru	(Canada) Wen Yu Zhang	21–19, 15–21, 21–8	Gold

=== South American Games ===
Women's singles
Year	Venue	Opponent	Score	Result
2022	Estadio León Condou, Asunción, Paraguay	(Brazil) Sâmia Lima	21–14, 21–10	Gold
2026	Instituto Superior de Educación Física N° 11, Rosario, Santa Fe, Argentina	(Peru) Inés Castillo	21–15, 21–18	Gold

Women's doubles
Year	Venue	Partner	Opponent	Score	Result
2022	Estadio León Condou; Asunción, Paraguay	(Brazil) Sânia Lima	(Brazil) Jaqueline Lima (Brazil) Sâmia Lima	26–24, 21–13	Gold
2026	Instituto Superior de Educación Física N° 11; Rosario, Santa Fe, Argentina	(Brazil) Sânia Lima	(Brazil) Yasmim de Abreu (Brazil) Jaqueline Lima	21–10, 21–13	Gold

=== South American Championships ===
Women's singles
Year	Venue	Opponent	Score	Result
2021	Ginásio Univille, Joinville, Brazil	(Brazil) Jaqueline Lima	18–21, 21–18, 21–13	Gold

=== Junior Pan American Games ===
Girls' singles
Year	Venue	Opponent	Score	Result
2021	Pacific Valley Events Center, Yumbo, Valle, Colombia	(Canada) Rachel Chan	8–21, 9–21	Bronze
2025	SND Stadium, Asunción, Paraguay	(Canada) Rachel Chan	12–21, 16–21	Silver

Mixed doubles
Year	Venue	Partner	Opponent	Score	Result
2025	SND Stadium, Asunción, Paraguay	(Brazil) Davi Silva	(Canada) Victor Lai (Canada) Rachel Chan	23–21, 14–21, 21–19	Gold

=== BWF International Challenge/Series (15 titles, 3 runners-up) ===
Women's singles
Year	Tournament	Opponent	Score	Result
2021	Brazil International	(Brazil) Jaqueline Lima	14–21, 25–23, 21–15	(gold) Winner
2021	Dominican Open	(Brazil) Sâmia Lima	21–9, 21–17	(gold) Winner
2021	El Salvador International	(United States) Ishika Jaiswal	19–21, 17–21	(silver) Runner-up
2022	Brazil International	(Mexico) Vanessa García	21–13, 21–14	(gold) Winner
2022	Perú International	(Mexico) Haramara Gaitán	21–16, 21–16	(gold) Winner
2023	Santo Domingo Open	(Brazil) Sâmia Lima	21–7, 21–3	(gold) Winner
2023	El Salvador International	(United States) Disha Gupta	21–12, 21–11	(gold) Winner
2024	Perú International	(Canada) Chloe Hoang	21–16, 21–12	(gold) Winner
2024	El Salvador International	(Ukraine) Yevheniia Kantemyr	21–10, 21–14	(gold) Winner
2024	Canadian International	(Canada) Michelle Li	21–18, 14–21, 21–17	(gold) Winner
2025	Perú International	(Peru) Inés Castillo	8–15, 15–8, 15–6	(gold) Winner
2026	Portugal International	(Denmark) Frederikke Østegaard	12–21, 21–11, 21–16	(gold) Winner
2026	Brazil International	(Canada) Rachel Chan	16–21, 21–16, 21–15	(gold) Winner
2026	Mexican International	(India) Shriyanshi Valishetty	21–12, 16–21, 18–21	(silver) Runner-up
2026	Guatemala International	(Chinese Taipei) Huang Ching-ping	21–16, 21–14	(gold) Winner

Women's doubles
Year	Tournament	Partner	Opponent	Score	Result
2023	Santo Domingo Open	(Brazil) Sânia Lima	(Brazil) Jaqueline Lima (Brazil) Sâmia Lima	21–16, 24–22	(gold) Winner
2026	Brazil International	(Brazil) Sânia Lima	(Brazil) Jaqueline Lima (Brazil) Sâmia Lima	21–13, 18–21, 14–21	(silver) Runner-up

Mixed doubles
Year	Tournament	Partner	Opponent	Score	Result
2026	Guatemala International	(Brazil) Sânia Lima	(Japan) Mihane Endo (Japan) Natsumi Takasaki	21–17, 22–20	(gold) Winner

BWF International Challenge tournament
BWF International Series tournament
BWF Future Series tournament
