= Badminton at the 2022 South American Games =

Badminton competitions at the 2022 South American Games

- Venue: Estadio León Condou
- Dates: October 2−7
- Nations: 13

Badminton competitions at the 2022 South American Games in Asunción, Paraguay were held between October 2 and 7, 2022 at the Estadio León Condou.

== Schedule ==
The competition schedule is as follows:

P	Preliminary round	F	Final

Date Event	Sun 2	Mon 3	Tue 4	Wed 5	Thu 6	Fri 7
Men's singles			P	P	P	F
Men's doubles				P	P	F
Women's singles			P	P	P	F
Women's doubles				P	P	F
Mixed doubles			P	P	P	F
Mixed teams	P	F				

== Medal summary ==
=== Medal table ===
* Host nation (Paraguay)

Rank	Nation	Gold	Silver	Bronze	Total
1	Brazil	6	4	1	11
2	Peru	0	2	8	10
3	Colombia	0	0	2	2
Totals (3 entries)		6	6	11	23

=== Medalists ===
==== Men ====
Event	Gold	Silver	Bronze
Singles	Jonathan Matias; Brazil	Donnians Oliveira; Brazil	Davi Silva; Brazil
Singles	Jonathan Matias; Brazil	Donnians Oliveira; Brazil	José Guevara; Peru
Doubles	Fabrício Farias; Davi Silva; Brazil	Daniel la Torre; Diego Subauste; Peru	Daniel Borja; Miguel Quirama; Colombia
Doubles	Fabrício Farias; Davi Silva; Brazil	Daniel la Torre; Diego Subauste; Peru	José Guevara; Diego Mini; Peru

==== Women ====
Event	Gold	Silver	Bronze
Singles	Juliana Vieira; Brazil	Sâmia Lima; Brazil	Inés Castillo; Peru
Singles	Juliana Vieira; Brazil	Sâmia Lima; Brazil	Fernanda Saponara; Peru
Doubles	Sania Lima; Juliana Vieira; Brazil	Jaqueline Lima; Sâmia Lima; Brazil	Inés Castillo; Paula la Torre; Peru
Doubles	Sania Lima; Juliana Vieira; Brazil	Jaqueline Lima; Sâmia Lima; Brazil	Namie Miyahira; Fernanda Saponara; Peru

==== Mixed ====
Event	Gold	Silver	Bronze
Doubles	Fabrício Farias; Jaqueline Lima; Brazil	Davi Silva; Sania Lima; Brazil	Diego Mini; Paula la Torre; Peru
Doubles	Fabrício Farias; Jaqueline Lima; Brazil	Davi Silva; Sania Lima; Brazil	Inés Castillo; José Guevara; Peru
Teams	Brazil; Davi Silva; Donnians Oliveira; Fabrício Farias; Jaqueline Lima; Jonathan Matias; Juliana Vieira; Sâmia Lima; Sânia Lima	Peru; Daniel la Torre; Diego Mini; Diego Subauste; Fernanda Saponara; Inés Castillo; José Guevara; Namie Miyahira; Paula la Torre	Colombia; Karen Patiño; Juliana Giraldo; Miguel Quirama; Daniel Borja; Giovanny Castaño; Julieth Pérez

== Participation ==
Thirteen nations participated in badminton events of the 2022 South American Games.

- Argentina
- Aruba
- Bolivia
- Brazil
- Chile
- Colombia
- Ecuador
- Guyana
- Panama
- Paraguay
- Peru
- Suriname
- Venezuela

== Results ==
=== Men's singles ===
Round of 32
(Suriname) Sören Opti	21	21
(Paraguay) Alejandro Avalos	12	6
(Guyana) Narayan Ramdhani	21	21
(Colombia) Daniel Borja	15	15
(Bolivia) Henry Mendoza	8	11
(Aruba) Mackie Lu	21	21
(Ecuador) Alan Erben	21	21
(Colombia) Giovanny Castaño	8	12
(Chile) Fernando Sanhueza	11	19
(Panama) Kyle Seixas	21	21
(Paraguay) Leo Lee	17	4
(Ecuador) Andy Baque	21	21
(Suriname) Darren van de Leuv	7	10
(Peru) Daniel la Torre	21	21
(Brazil) Davi Silva	21	21
(Chile) Alonso Medel	8	11
(Colombia) Miguel Quirama	21	21
(Bolivia) Ignacio Galarza	3	3
(Paraguay) Josías Haneman	22	16
(Venezuela) Frank Barrios	24	21
(Guyana) Akili Haynes	10	21	19
(Ecuador) Diego Zambrano	21	12	21

Round of 16
(Brazil) Jonathan Matias	21	21
(Suriname) Sören Opti	11	15
(Argentina) Nicolás Oliva	21	21
(Guyana) Narayan Ramdhani	10	14
(Peru) José Guevara	21	21
(Aruba) Mackie Lu	6	8
(Ecuador) Alan Erben	21	21
(Panama) Kyle Seixas	16	14
(Ecuador) Andy Baque	10	5
(Peru) Daniel la Torre	21	21
(Brazil) Davi Silva	21	21
(Argentina) Santiago Otero	10	11
(Colombia) Miguel Quirama	21	23
(Venezuela) Frank Barrios	12	21
(Ecuador) Diego Zambrano	5	5
(Brazil) Donnians Oliveira	21	21

Quarterfinals
(Brazil) Jonathan Matias	21	21
(Argentina) Nicolás Oliva	10	12
(Peru) José Guevara	21	22
(Ecuador) Alan Erben	7	20
(Peru) Daniel la Torre	18	19
(Brazil) Davi Silva	21	21
(Colombia) Miguel Quirama	14	10
(Brazil) Donnians Oliveira	21	21

Semifinals
(Brazil) Jonathan Matias	21	21
(Peru) José Guevara	18	14
(Brazil) Davi Silva	9	13
(Brazil) Donnians Oliveira	21	21

Finals
(Brazil) Jonathan Matias	21	21
(Brazil) Donnians Oliveira	11	14

=== Men's doubles ===
Round of 16
(Ecuador) Erben / Zambrano	21	21
(Paraguay) Haneman / González	14	12
(Bolivia) Mendoza / Galarza	3	1
(Brazil) Silva / Farias	21	21
(Colombia) Borja / Quirama	21	21
(Suriname) Opti / Van De Leuv	18	12
(Guyana) Haynes / Ramdhani	20	13
(Paraguay) Avalos / Leo Lee	21	21
(Argentina) Oliva / Otero	21	15	21
(Brazil) Matias / Oliveira	18	20	17

Quarterfinals
(Peru) Mini / Guevara	21	21
(Ecuador) Erben / Zambrano	6	15
(Chile) Medel / Sanhueza	8	13
(Brazil) Silva / Farias	21	21
(Colombia) Borja / Quirama	21	21
(Paraguay) Avalos / Leo Lee	16	15
(Argentina) Oliva / Otero	21	21	17
(Peru) La Torre / Subauste	15	23	21

Semifinals
(Peru) Mini / Guevara	12	17
(Brazil) Silva / Farias	21	21
(Colombia) Borja / Quirama	8	12
(Peru) La Torre / Subauste	21	21

Final
(Brazil) Silva / Farias	21	21
(Peru) La Torre / Subauste	17	13

=== Women's singles ===
Round of 32
(Bolivia) Jenommy Mendoza	6	8
(Suriname) Chaista Soemodipoero	21	21
(Ecuador) Natalia Roman	21	17	21
(Paraguay) Dahiana Alvarez	14	21	18
(Argentina) Iona Gualdi	21	14	21
(Colombia) Karen Patiño	19	21	15
(Guyana) Priyanna Ramdhani	21	21
(Chile) Rosa Quilodrán	19	12
(Aruba) Leyenne Schairer	21	21
(Paraguay) Cecilia Haneman	21	8
(Colombia) María Pérez	21	14	21
(Ecuador) María Zambrano	18	21	19
(Peru) Namie Miyahira	21	21
(Bolivia) Juanita Siviora	9	4
(Panama) Kelly Yau	21	21
(Suriname) Erisa Bleau	14	19
(Chile) Ashley Montre	21	21
(Ecuador) Brittany Navarrete	4	6
(Colombia) Juliana Giraldo	21	21
(Paraguay) Ana Amarilla	8	5

Round of 16
(Brazil) Juliana Vieira	21	21
(Suriname) Chaista Soemodipoero	2	1
(Venezuela) Damaris Ortiz	21	21
(Ecuador) Natalia Roman	8	7
(Peru) Fernanda Saponara	21	21
(Argentina) Iona Gualdi	16	13
(Guyana) Priyanna Ramdhani	21	21
(Aruba) Leyenne Schairer	19	11
(Colombia) María Pérez	21	14	19
(Peru) Namie Miyahira	18	21	21
(Panama) Kelly Yau	4	2
(Brazil) Sâmia Lima	21	21
(Chile) Ashley Montre	21	24
(Argentina) Ailen Oliva	15	22
(Colombia) Juliana Giraldo	16	4
(Peru) Inés Castillo	21	21

Quarterfinals
(Brazil) Juliana Vieira	21	21
(Venezuela) Damaris Ortiz	4	8
(Peru) Fernanda Saponara	21	21
(Guyana) Priyanna Ramdhani	9	8
(Peru) Namie Miyahira	16	18
(Brazil) Sâmia Lima	21	21
(Chile) Ashley Montre	W
(Peru) Inés Castillo	0

Semifinals
(Brazil) Juliana Vieira	21	21
(Peru) Fernanda Saponara	14	15
(Brazil) Sâmia Lima	21	21
(Peru) Inés Castillo	16	18

Finals
(Brazil) Juliana Vieira	21	21
(Brazil) Sâmia Lima	14	10

=== Women's doubles ===
Round of 16
(Ecuador) Navarrete / Roman	6	8
(Peru) Miyahira / Saponara	21	21
(Chile) Montre / Quilodrán	6	8
(Brazil) Lima / Vieira	21	21
(Paraguay) Álvarez / Haneman	21	21
(Bolivia) Siviora / Mendoza	0	6

Quarterfinals
(Brazil) Lima / Lima	21	21
(Argentina) Oliva / Gualdi	10	9
(Colombia) Giraldo / Patiño	16	21	12
(Peru) Miyahira / Saponara	21	16	21
(Brazil) Lima / Vieira	21	21
(Suriname) Bleau / Soemodipoero	8	4
(Paraguay) Álvarez / Haneman	4	8
(Peru) Castillo / La Torre	21	21

Semifinals
(Brazil) Lima / Lima	21	21
(Peru) Miyahira / Saponara	9	14
(Brazil) Lima / Vieira	21	21
(Peru) Castillo / La Torre	14	16

Final
(Brazil) Lima / Lima	24	13
(Brazil) Lima / Vieira	26	21

=== Mixed doubles ===
Round of 32
(Bolivia) Galarza / Siviora	14	14
(Paraguay) Haneman / Haneman	21	21
(Chile) Quilodrán / Sanhueza	13	13
(Ecuador) Román / Zambrano	21	21
(Suriname) Bleau / Van de Leuv	8	6
(Colombia) Giraldo / Quirama	21	21
(Bolivia) Mendoza / Mendoza	3	6
(Chile) Medel / Montre	21	21
(Guyana) Ramdhani / Ramdhani	21	21
(Venezuela) Barrios / Ortiz	9	8

Round of 16
(Brazil) Farias / Lima	21	21
(Argentina) Gualdi / Oliva	7	8
(Colombia) Castaño / Patiño	21	21
(Paraguay) Haneman / Haneman	13	7
(Peru) Castillo / Guevara	21	21
(Panama) Seixas / Yau	6	4
(Aruba) Lu / Schairier	21	9	13
(Ecuador) Román / Zambrano	8	21	21
(Colombia) Giraldo / Quirama	21	21
(Paraguay) Amarilla / Lee	14	13
(Chile) Medel / Montre	W
(Peru) Mini / La Torre	0
(Guyana) Ramdhani / Ramdhani	21	21
(Ecuador) Baque / Zambrano	13	16
(Brazil) Silva / Lima	21	21
(Argentina) Oliva / Otero	10	13

Quarterfinals
(Brazil) Farias / Lima	21	21
(Colombia) Castaño / Patiño	4	8
(Peru) Castillo / Guevara	21	21
(Ecuador) Román / Zambrano	11	7
(Colombia) Giraldo / Quirama	13	10
(Peru) Mini / La Torre	21	21
(Guyana) Ramdhani / Ramdhani	6	9
(Brazil) Silva / Lima	21	21

Semifinals
(Brazil) Farias / Lima	21	21
(Peru) Castillo / Guevara	12	14
(Peru) Mini / La Torre	13	20
(Brazil) Silva / Lima	21	22

Finals
(Brazil) Farias / Lima	26	21
(Brazil) Silva / Lima	24	12

=== Mixed team ===
Group stage
Group A

Pos	Team	Pld	W	D	L	GF	GA	GD	Pts	Qualification
1	Brazil	2	2	0	0	10	0	+10	4	Qualification to knock-out stage
2	Ecuador	2	1	0	1	5	5	0	3	
3	Paraguay	2	0	0	2	0	10	−10	2	

Group B

Pos	Team	Pld	W	D	L	GF	GA	GD	Pts	Qualification
1	Peru	2	2	0	0	10	0	+10	4	Qualification to knock-out stage
2	Argentina	2	1	0	1	5	5	0	3	
3	Suriname	2	0	0	2	0	10	−10	2	

Group C

Pos	Team	Pld	W	D	L	GF	GA	GD	Pts	Qualification
1	Colombia	2	2	0	0	10	0	+10	4	Qualification to knock-out stage
2	Chile	2	1	0	1	5	5	0	3	Qualification to knock-out stage
3	Bolivia	2	0	0	2	0	10	−10	2	

Knockout stage

Semifinals
Brazil	3
Chile	0
Colombia	0
Peru	3

Final
Brazil	3
Peru	0
Bronze medal match
Chile	0
Colombia	3
