= Jaqueline Lima =

Brazilian badminton player (born 2001)

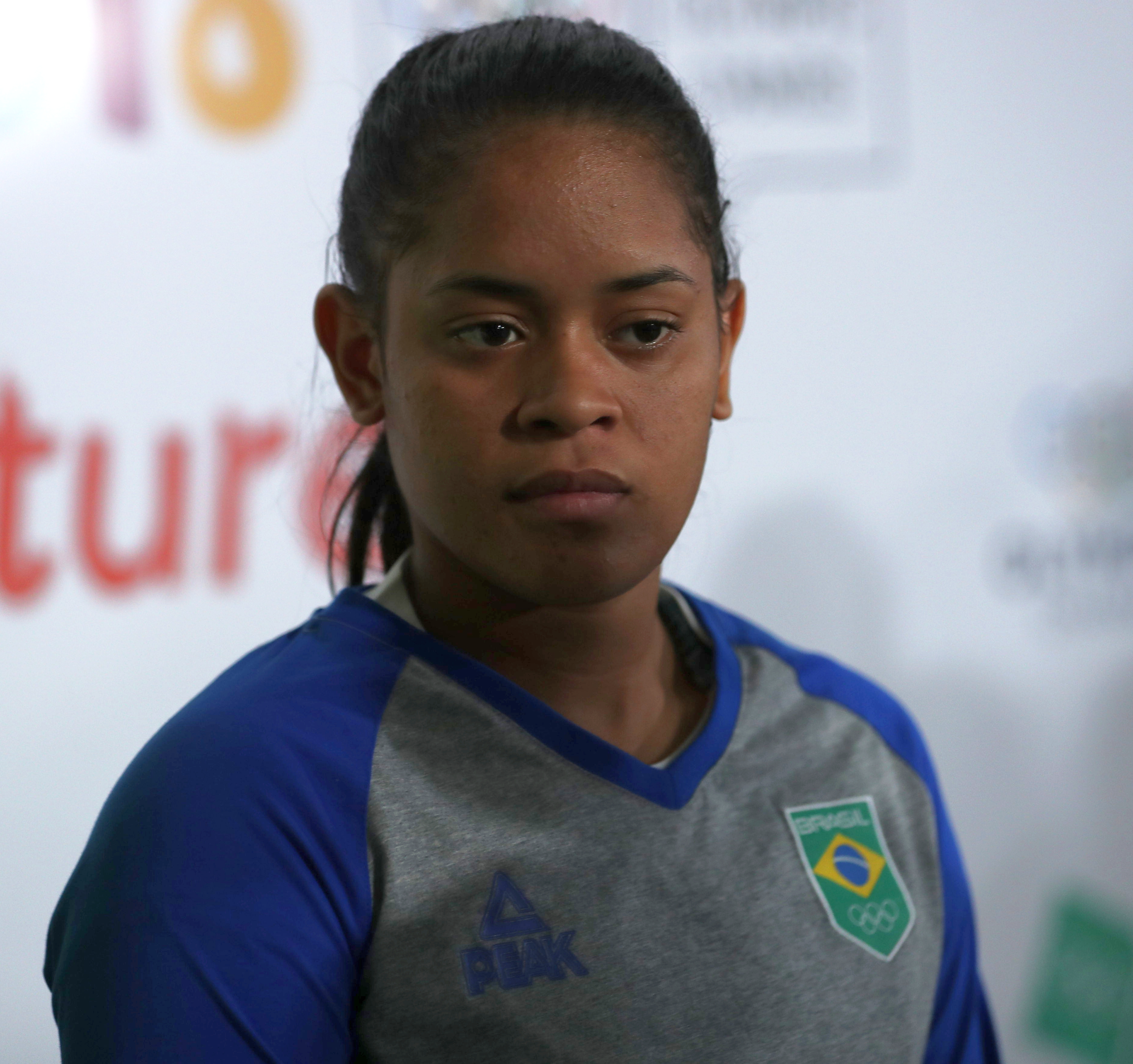
- Lima at the 2018 Summer Youth Olympics

Personal information
- Born: Jaqueline Maria Lopes Lima; 23 April 2001 (age 25)

Sport
- Country: Brazil
- Sport: Badminton
- Handedness: Right

Women's singles & doubles
- Highest ranking: 108 (WS 17 March 2020); 39 (WD with Sâmia Lima, 27 December 2022); 39 (XD with Fabrício Farias, 31 January 2023)
- Current ranking: 65 (WD with Sâmia Lima), 53 (XD with Fabrício Farias) (27 October 2026)
- BWF profile
Medal record
Women's badminton
Representing Brazil
Pan American Games
Bronze medal – third place	2019 Lima	Women's doubles
Bronze medal – third place	2019 Lima	Mixed doubles
Pan American Championships
Silver medal – second place	2019 Aguascalientes	Mixed doubles
Bronze medal – third place	2019 Aguascalientes	Women's doubles
Bronze medal – third place	2023 Kingston	Mixed doubles
Bronze medal – third place	2024 Guatemala City	Women's doubles
Bronze medal – third place	2024 Guatemala City	Mixed doubles
Bronze medal – third place	2025 Lima	Women's doubles
Bronze medal – third place	2025 Lima	Mixed doubles
Bronze medal – third place	2026 Lima	Women's doubles
Bronze medal – third place	2026 Lima	Mixed doubles
Pan Am Mixed Team Championships
Silver medal – second place	2017 Santo Domingo	Mixed team
Bronze medal – third place	2019 Lima	Mixed team
Bronze medal – third place	2023 Guadalajara	Mixed team
Bronze medal – third place	2025 Aguascalientes	Mixed team
Pan Am Female Cup
Bronze medal – third place	2020 Salvador	Women's team
Bronze medal – third place	2022 Acapulco	Women's team
Bronze medal – third place	2024 São Paulo	Women's team
Bronze medal – third place	2026 Guatemala City	Women's team
South American Games
Gold medal – first place	2022 Asunción	Mixed doubles
Gold medal – first place	2022 Asunción	Mixed team
Gold medal – first place	2026 Santa Fe	Mixed team
Silver medal – second place	2022 Asunción	Women's doubles
Silver medal – second place	2026 Santa Fe	Women's doubles
Silver medal – second place	2026 Santa Fe	Mixed doubles
Junior Pan American Games
Bronze medal – third place	2021 Cali–Valle	Mixed doubles
Pan Am Junior Championships
Silver medal – second place	2015 Tijuana	Mixed team
Silver medal – second place	2016 Lima	Mixed team
Silver medal – second place	2018 Salvador	Mixed team
Bronze medal – third place	2017 Markham	Mixed team
Bronze medal – third place	2018 Salvador	Girls' doubles
Bronze medal – third place	2019 Moncton	Mixed team
Representing (International Olympic Committee) Mixed-NOCs
Youth Olympic Games
Bronze medal – third place	2018 Buenos Aires	Mixed team

Jaqueline Maria Lopes Lima (Note: This name uses Portuguese naming customs: the first or maternal family name is Lopes and the second or paternal family name is Lima.) (born 23 April 2001) is a Brazilian badminton player from Joca Claudino Esportes badminton club. She joined the Brazil national badminton team in 2016, and in 2017 she competed in the mixed team event at the 2017 Pan Am Badminton Championships where the team won silver medal. She won her first senior international title at the 2017 Brazil International Challenge tournament partnered with Sâmia Lima. Lima participated at the 2018 Summer Youth Olympics, and was part of the team Theta won the bronze medal in the mixed team event. At the 2019 Lima Pan American Games, she won two bronze medals in the women's and mixed doubles events.

== Achievements ==
=== Pan American Games ===
Women's doubles
Year	Venue	Partner	Opponent	Score	Result
2019	Polideportivo 3 Lima, Peru	(Brazil) Sâmia Lima	(United States) Keui-Ya Chen (United States) Jamie Hsu	21–17, 12–21, 18–21	Bronze

Mixed doubles
Year	Venue	Partner	Opponent	Score	Result
2019	Polideportivo 3 Lima, Peru	(Brazil) Fabrício Farias	(Canada) Joshua Hurlburt-Yu (Canada) Josephine Wu	22–20, 17–21, 13–21	Bronze

=== Pan Am Championships ===
Women's doubles
Year	Venue	Partner	Opponent	Score	Result
2019	Gimnasio Olímpico, Aguascalientes, Mexico	(Brazil) Sâmia Lima	(Canada) Rachel Honderich (Canada) Kristen Tsai	17–21, 8–21	Bronze
2024	Teodoro Palacios Flores Gymnasium, Guatemala City, Guatemala	(Brazil) Sâmia Lima	(United States) Annie Xu (United States) Kerry Xu	13–21, 14–21	Bronze
2025	Videna Poli 2, Lima, Peru	(Brazil) Sâmia Lima	(Canada) Jackie Dent (Canada) Crystal Lai	10–21, 8–21	Bronze
2026	High Performance Center VIDENA, Lima, Peru	(Brazil) Sâmia Lima	(United States) Lauren Lam (United States) Allison Lee	14–21, 9–21	Bronze

Mixed doubles
Year	Venue	Partner	Opponent	Score	Result
2019	Gimnasio Olímpico, Aguascalientes, Mexico	(Brazil) Fabrício Farias	(Canada) Joshua Hurlburt-Yu (Canada) Josephine Wu	14–21, 19–21	Silver
2023	G.C. Foster College of Physical Education and Sport, Kingston, Jamaica	(Brazil) Fabrício Farias	(Canada) Ty Alexander Lindeman (Canada) Josephine Wu	21–23, 20–22	Bronze
2024	Teodoro Palacios Flores Gymnasium, Guatemala City, Guatemala	(Brazil) Fabrício Farias	(United States) Vinson Chiu (United States) Jennie Gai	15–21, 19–21	Bronze
2025	Videna Poli 2, Lima, Peru	(Brazil) Fabrício Farias	(Canada) Jonathan Lai (Canada) Crystal Lai	17–21, 21–15, 19–21	Bronze
2026	High Performance Center VIDENA, Lima, Peru	(Brazil) Fabrício Farias	(United States) Presley Smith (United States) Jennie Gai	14–21, 10–21	Bronze

=== South American Games ===
Women's doubles
Year	Venue	Partner	Opponent	Score	Result
2022	Estadio León Condou; Asunción, Paraguay	(Brazil) Sâmia Lima	(Brazil) Sânia Lima (Brazil) Juliana Viana Vieira	24–26, 13–21	Silver
2026	Instituto Superior de Educación Física N° 11; Rosario, Santa Fe, Argentina	(Brazil) Yasmim de Abreu	(Brazil) Sânia Lima (Brazil) Juliana Viana Vieira	10–21, 13–21	Silver

Mixed doubles
Year	Venue	Partner	Opponent	Score	Result
2022	Estadio León Condou; Asunción, Paraguay	(Brazil) Fabrício Farias	(Brazil) Davi Silva (Brazil) Sânia Lima	26–24, 21–12	Gold
2026	Instituto Superior de Educación Física N° 11; Rosario, Santa Fe, Argentina	(Brazil) Fabrício Farias	(Brazil) Davi Silva (Brazil) Sânia Lima	18–21, 16–21	Silver

=== Junior Pan American Games ===
Mixed doubles
Year	Venue	Partner	Opponent	Score	Result
2021	Pacific Valley Events Center; Yumbo, Valle, Colombia	(Brazil) Jonathan Matias	(Canada) Brian Yang (Canada) Rachel Chan	15–21, 12–21	Bronze

=== Pan Am Junior Championships ===
Girls' doubles
Year	Venue	Partner	Opponent	Score	Result
2018	Centro Pan-Americano de Judô; Salvador, Brazil	(Brazil) Sâmia Lima	(Canada) Crystal Lai (Canada) Wendy Zhang	11–21, 15–21	Bronze

=== BWF International Challenge/Series (26 titles, 16 runners-up) ===
Women's singles
Year	Tournament	Opponent	Score	Result
2018	Argentina International	(United States) Ruhi Raju	21–15, 21–18	(gold) Winner
2019	Brazil Future Series	(Brazil) Fabiana Silva	11–21, 21–19, 18–21	(silver) Runner-up
2019	Brazil International	(Mexico) Haramara Gaitan	21–8, 26–24	(gold) Winner
2021	Brazil International	(Brazil) Juliana Viana Vieira	21–14, 23–25, 15–21	(silver) Runner-up

Women's doubles
Year	Tournament	Partner	Opponent	Score	Result
2017	Brazil International	(Brazil) Sâmia Lima	(Brazil) Thalita Correa (Brazil) Paloma Eduarda da Silva	14–21, 21–19, 21–15	(gold) Winner
2017	Peru International	(Brazil) Sâmia Lima	(Peru) Daniela Macías (Peru) Dánica Nishimura	19–21, 20–22	(silver) Runner-up
2019	Peru International	(Brazil) Sâmia Lima	(Guatemala) Diana Corleto (Guatemala) Nikté Sotomayor	15–21, 16–21	(silver) Runner-up
2019	Brazil Future Series	(Brazil) Sâmia Lima	(Brazil) Mariana Pedrol Freitas (Brazil) Tamires Santos	21–15, 21–13	(gold) Winner
2019	Guatemala International	(Brazil) Sâmia Lima	(Peru) Daniela Macías (Peru) Dánica Nishimura	21–19, 21–13	(gold) Winner
2019	Brazil International	(Brazil) Sâmia Lima	(Brazil) Mariana Pedrol Freitas (Brazil) Bianca de Oliveira Lima	21–7, 21–10	(gold) Winner
2019	Santo Domingo Open	(Brazil) Sâmia Lima	(Canada) Camille Leblanc (Canada) Alexandra Mocanu	21–12, 20–22, 30–29	(gold) Winner
2021	Brazil International	(Brazil) Sâmia Lima	(Brazil) Sânia Lima (Brazil) Juliana Viana Vieira	15–21, 21–14, 21–17	(gold) Winner
2021	Dominican Open	(Brazil) Sâmia Lima	(Brazil) Sânia Lima (Brazil) Tamires Santos	21–14, 21–12	(gold) Winner
2022	Brazil International	(Brazil) Sâmia Lima	(Guatemala) Diana Corleto (Guatemala) Nikté Sotomayor	21–16, 23–21	(gold) Winner
2022	Peru International Series	(Brazil) Sâmia Lima	(Brazil) Sânia Lima (Brazil) Tamires Santos	21–13, 21–13	(gold) Winner
2023	Santo Domingo Open	(Brazil) Sâmia Lima	(Brazil) Sânia Lima (Brazil) Juliana Viana Vieira	16–21, 22–24	(silver) Runner-up
2023	Brazil International	(Brazil) Sâmia Lima	(Mexico) Haramara Gaitán (Mexico) Sabrina Solis	21–11, 21–13	(gold) Winner
2023	Peru Challenge	(Brazil) Sâmia Lima	(United States) Annie Xu (United States) Kerry Xu	11–21, 10–21	(silver) Runner-up
2024	Iran Fajr International	(Brazil) Sâmia Lima	(Iran) Paria Eskandari (Iran) Romina Tajik	21–14, 21–11	(gold) Winner
2024	Perú International Series	(Brazil) Sâmia Lima	(Guatemala) Diana Corleto (Guatemala) Nikté Sotomayor	21–11, 21–17	(gold) Winner
2024	El Salvador International	(Brazil) Sâmia Lima	(Guatemala) Diana Corleto (Guatemala) Nikté Sotomayor	21–19, 21–12	(gold) Winner
2025	Perú International	(Brazil) Sâmia Lima	(Peru) Fernanda Munar (Peru) Rafaela Munar	15–8, 15–8	(gold) Winner
2025	Guatemala International	(Brazil) Sâmia Lima	(Japan) Mao Hatasue (Japan) Kanano Muroya	19–21, 16–21	(silver) Runner-up
2026	Brazil International	(Brazil) Sâmia Lima	(Brazil) Sânia Lima (Brazil) Juliana Viana Vieira	13–21, 21–18, 21–14	(gold) Winner

Mixed doubles
Year	Tournament	Partner	Opponent	Score	Result
2018	North Harbour International	(Brazil) Fabrício Farias	(New Zealand) Maika Phillips (New Zealand) Anona Pak	6–21, 25–27	(silver) Runner-up
2018	Argentina International	(Brazil) Fabrício Farias	(United States) Ricky Liuzhou (United States) Angela Zhang	21–19, 21–15	(gold) Winner
2018	Santo Domingo Open	(Brazil) Fabrício Farias	(Canada) Joshua Hurlburt-Yu (Canada) Josephine Wu	17–21, 21–16, 20–22	(silver) Runner-up
2019	Peru International	(Brazil) Fabrício Farias	(United States) Howard Shu (United States) Paula Lynn Obañana	17–21, 20–22	(silver) Runner-up
2019	Brazil Future Series	(Brazil) Fabrício Farias	(Brazil) Artur Pomoceno (Brazil) Sâmia Lima	21–17, 21–16	(gold) Winner
2019	Carebaco International	(Brazil) Fabrício Farias	(United States) Vinson Chiu (United States) Breanna Chi	16–21, 14–21	(silver) Runner-up
2019	International Mexicano	(Brazil) Fabrício Farias	(Mexico) Luis Montoya (Mexico) Vanessa Villalobos	19–21, 19–21	(silver) Runner-up
2019	Guatemala International	(Brazil) Fabrício Farias	(Guatemala) Jonathan Solís (Guatemala) Diana Corleto	Walkover	(gold) Winner
2019	Brazil International	(Brazil) Fabrício Farias	(Brazil) Francielton Farias (Brazil) Sâmia Lima	21–18, 21–18	(gold) Winner
2019	Santo Domingo Open	(Brazil) Fabrício Farias	(Brazil) Francielton Farias (Brazil) Sâmia Lima	21–16, 21–16	(gold) Winner
2021	Brazil International	(Brazil) Fabrício Farias	(Brazil) Artur Pomoceno (Brazil) Sâmia Lima	21–19, 21–12	(gold) Winner
2021	Dominican Open	(Brazil) Fabrício Farias	(Brazil) Artur Pomoceno (Brazil) Sâmia Lima	24–22, 21–19	(gold) Winner
2022	Peru International Series	(Brazil) Fabrício Farias	(Brazil) Davi Silva (Brazil) Sânia Lima	21–19, 19–21, 21–15	(gold) Winner
2024	Perú International Series	(Brazil) Fabrício Farias	(Mexico) Luis Montoya (Mexico) Miriam Rodríguez	15–21, 21–17, 18–21	(silver) Runner-up
2024	El Salvador International	(Brazil) Fabrício Farias	(Brazil) Davi Silva (Brazil) Sania Lima	24–26, 21–15, 19–21	(silver) Runner-up
2024	Canadian International	(Brazil) Fabrício Farias	(Brazil) Davi Silva (Brazil) Sania Lima	21–16, 21–19	(gold) Winner
2025	Perú International	(Brazil) Fabrício Farias	(Brazil) Davi Silva (Brazil) Sania Lima	11–15, 13–15	(silver) Runner-up
2026	Brazil International	(Brazil) Fabrício Farias	(Brazil) Davi Silva (Brazil) Sania Lima	21–16, 19–21, 12–21	(silver) Runner-up

BWF International Challenge tournament
BWF International Series tournament
BWF Future Series tournament
