= Badminton at the 2022 Bolivarian Games =

Badminton competitions at the 2022 Bolivarian Games

- Badminton pictogram
- Venue: Coliseo Arena de Sal
- Dates: 25–29 June 2022
- Competitors: 49 from 9 nations

Champions
- Peru (5 gold medals)

Badminton competitions at the 2022 Bolivarian Games in Valledupar, Colombia, were held from 25 to 29 June 2022 at Coliseo Arena de Sal in Zipaquirá, a sub-venue in the Cundinamarca department.

Six medal events were scheduled to be contested; singles and doubles for men and women, mixed doubles and mixed teams. A total of 49 athletes (25 men and 24 women) competed in the events. The events were open competitions without age restrictions.

Peru, who were the competition defending champions after Santa Marta 2017, won the badminton competitions again after winning 5 of the 6 gold medals at stake.

== Participating nations ==
A total of 9 nations (all the 7 ODEBO nations and 2 invited) registered athletes for the badminton competitions. Each nation was able to enter a maximum of 8 athletes (4 per gender).

- Bolivia (4 athletes)
- Chile (4)
- Colombia (8)
- Dominican Republic (6)
- Ecuador (6)
- El Salvador (4)
- Panama (1)
- Peru (8)
- Venezuela (8)

== Venue ==
The badminton competitions were held at the Coliseo Arena de Sal, in Zipaquirá, which has a capacity for 2,600 spectators. Badminton events were originally scheduled to be held at the Julio Villazón Baquero auditorium of the Fundación Colegio Bilingüe in Valledupar, and later at the Centro de Alto Rendimiento in Bogotá before moving to their final venue in Zipaquirá.

== Medal summary ==
=== Medal table ===
* Host nation (Colombia)

Rank	Nation	Gold	Silver	Bronze	Total
1	Peru (PER)	5	2	3	10
2	El Salvador (ESA)	1	1	2	4
3	Colombia (COL)*	0	3	3	6
4	Chile (CHI)	0	0	1	1
4	Dominican Republic (DOM)	0	0	1	1
4	Ecuador (ECU)	0	0	1	1
Totals (6 entries)		6	6	11	23

Source: Bolivarianos Valledupar 2022 – Badminton medals

=== Medalists ===
Event	Gold	Silver	Bronze
Men's singles	Uriel Canjura; El Salvador	Miguel Ángel Quirama; Colombia	José Guevara; Peru
Men's singles	Uriel Canjura; El Salvador	Miguel Ángel Quirama; Colombia	Daniel la Torre Regal; Peru
Women's singles	Inés Castillo; Peru	Maria Pérez; Colombia	Namie Miyahira; Peru
Women's singles	Inés Castillo; Peru	Maria Pérez; Colombia	Ashley Montre; Chile
Men's doubles	Peru; Diego Mini; José Guevara	Peru; Diego Subauste; Daniel la Torre Regal	Ecuador; Diego Zambrano; Alan Erben
Men's doubles	Peru; Diego Mini; José Guevara	Peru; Diego Subauste; Daniel la Torre Regal	El Salvador; Javier Alas; Uriel Canjura
Women's doubles	Peru; Inés Castillo; Paula la Torre Regal	Peru; Namie Miyahira; Fernanda Saponara	Colombia; Juliana Giraldo; Maria Pérez
Women's doubles	Peru; Inés Castillo; Paula la Torre Regal	Peru; Namie Miyahira; Fernanda Saponara	El Salvador; Fátima Centeno; Daniela Hernández
Mixed doubles	Peru; José Guevara; Inés Castillo	El Salvador; Javier Alas; Fátima Centeno	Colombia; Miguel Ángel Quirama; Juliana Giraldo
Mixed doubles	Peru; José Guevara; Inés Castillo	El Salvador; Javier Alas; Fátima Centeno	Colombia; Jhon Berdugo; Maria Pérez
Mixed team	Peru; Daniel la Torre Regal; José Guevara; Diego Mini; Inés Castillo; Paula la Torre Regal; Fernanda Saponara	Colombia; Daniel Borja; Miguel Ángel Quirama; Juliana Giraldo; Sara Ávila; Dainne Marulanda; Laura Londoño	Dominican Republic; Ernick Zorilla; Yonatan Linarez; Argenis Maríñez; Nairoby Jiménez; Claritza Confidente
