= Badminton at the 2019 Pan American Games – Women's doubles =

Badminton – Women's doubles at the 2019 Pan American Games
- Venue: Polideportivo 3
- Dates: July 30 – August 2
- Competitors: 26 from 11 nations

Medalists
Gold medal	Rachel Honderich; Kristen Tsai	Canada
Silver medal	Kuei-Ya Chen; Jamie Hsu	United States
Bronze medal	Tamires Santos; Fabiana Silva	Brazil
Bronze medal	Jaqueline Lima; Sâmia Lima	Brazil

The Women's doubles badminton event at the 2019 Pan American Games will be held from July 30 – August 2 at the Polideportivo 3 in Lima, Peru. The defending Pan American Games champion is Eva Lee and Paula Lynn Obañana of the United States.

Each National Olympic Committee could enter a maximum of four athletes (two pairs) into the competition. The athletes will be drawn into an elimination stage draw. Once a team lost a match, it will be not longer be able to compete. Each match will be contested as the best of three games.

== Seeds ==
The following pairs were seeded:

1. Rachel Honderich / Kristen Tsai (CAN) (champions)
2. Daniela Macías / Dánica Nishimura (PER) (quarterfinals)

== Results ==
=== Bracket ===
First Round
I Castillo (PER); P la Torre (PER)	21	21
S Scott (BAR); T Williams (BAR)	12	12
D Corleto (GUA); N Sotomayor (GUA)	21	20	16
T Santos (BRA); F Silva (BRA)	14	22	21
T Oropeza (CUB); Y Ortiz (CUB)	21	21
T Richardson (JAM); K Wynter (JAM)	13	11
H Gaitan (MEX); A Valero (MEX)	18	16
K-Y Chen (USA); J Hsu (USA)	21	21
N Jiménez (DOM); B Polanco (DOM)	13	23	18
J Lima (BRA); S Lima (BRA)	21	21	21

Quarterfinals
1	R Honderich (CAN); K Tsai (CAN)	21	21
I Castillo (PER); P la Torre (PER)	3	3
A Montre (CHI); C Naranjo (CHI)	7	13
T Santos (BRA); F Silva (BRA)	21	21
T Oropeza (CUB); Y Ortiz (CUB)	16	15
K-Y Chen (USA); J Hsu (USA)	21	21
J Lima (BRA); S Lima (BRA)	15	21	24
2	D Macías (PER); D Nishimura (PER)	21	15	22

Semifinals
1	R Honderich (CAN); K Tsai (CAN)	21	21
T Santos (BRA); F Silva (BRA)	5	8
K-Y Chen (USA); J Hsu (USA)	17	21	21
J Lima (BRA); S Lima (BRA)	21	12	18

Final
1	R Honderich (CAN); K Tsai (CAN)	21	21
K-Y Chen (USA); J Hsu (USA)	10	9
