= Brian Yang (badminton) =

Canadian badminton player (born 2001)

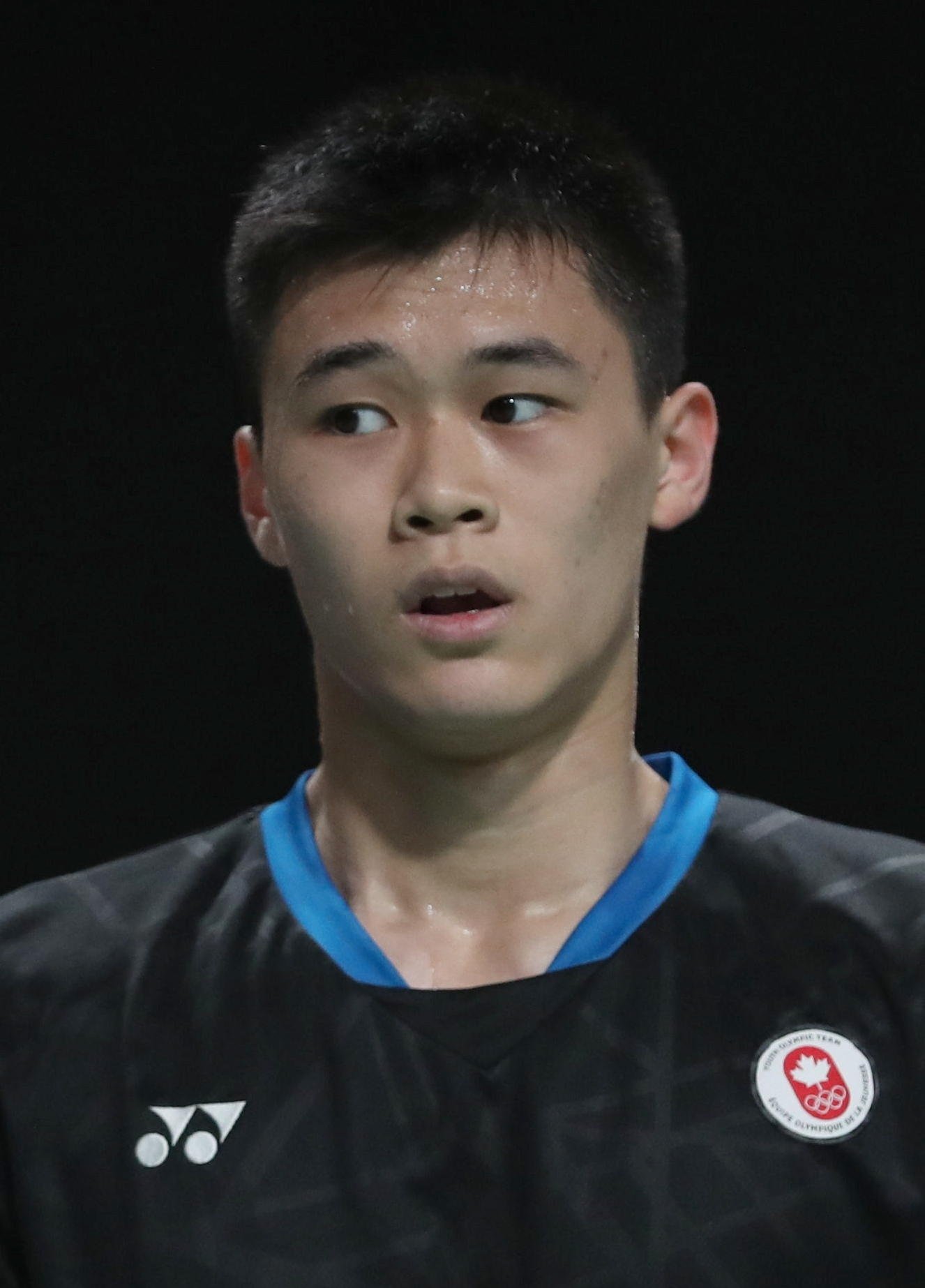
- Yang at the 2018 Summer Youth Olympics

Personal information
- Born: November 25, 2001 (age 24) Toronto, Ontario, Canada
- Height: 1.84 m (6 ft 0 in)
- Weight: 66 kg (146 lb)

Sport
- Country: Canada
- Sport: Badminton
- Handedness: Right

Men's singles
- Highest ranking: 21 (December 27, 2022)
- Current ranking: 38 (November 10, 2026)
- BWF profile
Medal record
Men's badminton
Representing Canada
Pan American Games
Gold medal – first place	2023 Santiago	Men's singles
Silver medal – second place	2019 Lima	Men's singles
Pan Am Championships
Gold medal – first place	2021 Guatemala City	Men's singles
Gold medal – first place	2023 Kingston	Men's singles
Silver medal – second place	2022 San Salvador	Men's singles
Bronze medal – third place	2024 Guatemala City	Men's singles
Bronze medal – third place	2025 Lima	Men's singles
Pan Am Mixed Team Championships
Gold medal – first place	2019 Lima	Mixed team
Gold medal – first place	2023 Guadalajara	Mixed team
Gold medal – first place	2025 Aguascalientes	Mixed team
Pan Am Male Cup
Gold medal – first place	2018 Tacarigua	Men's team
Gold medal – first place	2020 Salvador	Men's team
Gold medal – first place	2022 Acapulco	Men's team
Gold medal – first place	2024 São Paulo	Men's team
Gold medal – first place	2026 Guatemala City	Men's team
Junior Pan American Games
Gold medal – first place	2021 Cali–Valle	Boys' singles
Gold medal – first place	2021 Cali–Valle	Mixed doubles
Pan Am Junior Championships
Gold medal – first place	2016 Lima	Boys' doubles
Gold medal – first place	2016 Lima	Mixed doubles
Gold medal – first place	2016 Lima	Mixed team
Gold medal – first place	2017 Markham	Boys' singles
Gold medal – first place	2017 Markham	Mixed doubles
Gold medal – first place	2018 Salvador	Mixed team
Gold medal – first place	2019 Moncton	Boys' singles
Gold medal – first place	2019 Moncton	Boys' doubles
Silver medal – second place	2017 Markham	Mixed team
Silver medal – second place	2019 Moncton	Mixed doubles
Representing (International Olympic Committee) Mixed-NOCs
Youth Olympic Games
Gold medal – first place	2018 Buenos Aires	Mixed team

Brian Yang (born November 25, 2001) is a Canadian badminton player. He was a part of the Team Alpha that won the mixed team relay gold at the 2018 Summer Youth Olympics.

== Career ==
In 2016, he won three gold medals at the U–19 Pan Am Junior Championships, winning the boys' doubles, mixed doubles, and team events.

Yang won his first senior international title at 2017 Suriname International in the men's singles. In July, he won the boys' singles and mixed doubles titles at the Pan Am Junior Championships, while the Canada team captured the silver medal.

He represented Canada in the 2018 Commonwealth Games and Thomas Cup. At the El Salvador International, he won two titles in the men's singles and mixed doubles.

Yang clinched the men's singles title at the 2019 Canadian National Championships and became Canada's youngest national champion. He competed at the Sudirman Cup. Yang was named to Canada's 2019 Pan American Games team, ended up winning silver in the men's singles competition. He was crowned as the men's singles champion at the 2021 Pan Am Championships. He also won the gold medals in the boys' singles, doubles and mixed team at the Pan Am Junior Championships.

In June 2021, Yang was named to Canada's Olympic team for the 2020 Summer Olympics. He also competed at the first edition of the Junior Pan Am Games, clinching the gold medals in the boys' singles and mixed doubles.

In 2022, he won a silver medal at the Pan Am Championships, losing to Kevin Cordón in the final.

In his second appearance at the Pan American Games, Yang captured the gold medal in the men's singles after beating the defending champion Kevin Cordón in the final.

He also competed for Canada at the 2024 Summer Olympics in the men's singles event.

== Achievements ==
=== Pan American Games ===
Men's singles
Year	Venue	Opponent	Score	Result	Ref.
2019	Polideportivo 3 Lima, Peru	(Brazil) Ygor Coelho	19–21, 10–21	Silver	
2023	Olympic Training Center; Santiago, Chile	Kevin Cordón (EAI)	21–18, 21–6	Gold	

=== Pan Am Championships ===
Men's singles
Year	Venue	Opponent	Score	Result	Ref.
2021	Sagrado Corazon de Jesus; Guatemala City, Guatemala	(Canada) Jason Ho-Shue	21–13, 18–10 retired	Gold	
2022	Palacio de los Deportes Carlos "El Famoso" Hernández; San Salvador, El Salvador	(Guatemala) Kevin Cordón	17–21, 14–21	Silver	
2023	G.C. Foster College of Physical Education and Sport; Kingston, Jamaica	(El Salvador) Uriel Canjura	21–10, 21–5	Gold	
2024	Teodoro Palacios Flores Gymnasium; Guatemala City, Guatemala	(El Salvador) Uriel Canjura	16–21, 15–21	Bronze	
2025	Videna Poli 2 Lima, Peru	(Canada) Joshua Nguyen	21–15, 13–21, 13–21	Bronze	

=== Junior Pan American Games ===
Boys' singles
Year	Venue	Opponent	Score	Result	Ref.
2021	Pacific Valley Events Center; Yumbo, Valle, Colombia	(El Salvador) Uriel Canjura	21–8, 21–6	Gold	

Mixed doubles
Year	Venue	Partner	Opponent	Score	Result	Ref.
2021	Pacific Valley Events Center; Yumbo, Valle, Colombia	(Canada) Rachel Chan	(El Salvador) Uriel Canjura (El Salvador) Fátima Centeno	21–13, 21–14	Gold	

=== Pan Am Junior Championships ===
Boys' singles
Year	Venue	Opponent	Score	Result	Ref.
2017	Markham Pan Am Centre; Markham, Canada	(Brazil) Jonathan Matias	21–14, 21–13	Gold	
2019	CEPS Louis-J.-Robichaud; Moncton, Canada	(Canada) Kevin Wang	21–15, 21–8	Gold	

Boys' doubles
Year	Venue	Partner	Opponent	Score	Result	Ref.
2016	CAR la Videna; Lima, Peru	(Canada) Desmond Wang	(United States) Ricky Liuzhou (United States) Cadmus Yeo	17–21, 21–15, 21–13	Gold	
2019	CEPS Louis-J.-Robichaud; Moncton, Canada	(Canada) Jonathan Chien	(United States) Clayton Cayen (United States) Ryan Zheng	21–10, 23–21	Gold	

Mixed doubles
Year	Venue	Partner	Opponent	Score	Result	Ref.
2016	CAR la Videna; Lima, Peru	(Canada) Katie Ho-Shue	(United States) Vinson Chiu (United States) Jamie Hsu	21–14, 21–14	Gold	
2017	Markham Pan Am Centre; Markham, Canada	(Canada) Katie Ho-Shue	(Brazil) Fabricio Farias (Brazil) Sâmia Lima	21–14, 21–11	Gold	
2019	CEPS Louis-J.-Robichaud; Moncton, Canada	(Canada) Catherine Choi	(Canada) Jonathan Chien (Canada) Crystal Lai	21–18, 19–21, 18–21	Silver	

=== BWF World Tour (2 runners-up) ===
The BWF World Tour, which was announced on 19 March 2017 and implemented in 2018, is a series of elite badminton tournaments sanctioned by the Badminton World Federation (BWF). The BWF World Tour is divided into levels of World Tour Finals, Super 1000, Super 750, Super 500, Super 300 (part of the HSBC World Tour), and the BWF Tour Super 100.

Men's singles
Year	Tournament	Level	Opponent	Score	Result
2024	Indonesia Masters	Super 500	(Denmark) Anders Antonsen	21–18, 13–21, 18–21	(silver) Runner-up
2025	U.S. Open	Super 300	(India) Ayush Shetty	18–21, 13–21	(silver) Runner-up

=== BWF International Challenge/Series (10 titles, 5 runners-up) ===
Men's singles
Year	Tournament	Opponent	Score	Result
2017	Suriname International	(Cuba) Osleni Guerrero	12–21, 21–17, 21–14	(gold) Winner
2018	El Salvador International	(Guatemala) Heymard Humblers	21–11, 18–21, 21–16	(gold) Winner
2019	Brazil International	(Israel) Misha Zilberman	17–21, 20–22	(silver) Runner-up
2019	Peru Future Series	(Canada) B. R. Sankeerth	21–12, 11–21, 19–21	(silver) Runner-up
2019	Peru International	(Guatemala) Kevin Cordón	15–21, 21–13, 21–12	(gold) Winner
2019	Santo Domingo Open	(Guatemala) Kevin Cordón	21–8, 21–4	(gold) Winner
2019	Suriname International	(Guatemala) Kevin Cordón	Walkover	(gold) Winner
2019	Turkey Open	(Spain) Luis Enrique Peñalver	19–21, 19–21	(silver) Runner-up
2021	Peru International	(Brazil) Ygor Coelho	21–16, 21–18	(gold) Winner
2021	Denmark Masters	(Denmark) Victor Svendsen	16–21, 21–17, 21–15	(gold) Winner
2022	Canadian International	(Japan) Takuma Obayashi	11–21, 17–21	(silver) Runner-up
2023	Canadian International	(Canada) Victor Lai	21–15, 21–12	(gold) Winner
2024	Canadian International	(Canada) Victor Lai	21–14, 21–8	(gold) Winner
2025	Canadian International	(Canada) Victor Lai	14–21, 15–21	(silver) Runner-up

Mixed doubles
Year	Tournament	Partner	Opponent	Score	Result
2018	El Salvador International	(Canada) Catherine Choi	(Guatemala) Aníbal Marroquín (Peru) Dánica Nishimura	21–6, 21–7	(gold) Winner

BWF International Challenge tournament
BWF International Series tournament
BWF Future Series tournament
