= Badminton at the Junior Pan American Games =

Badminton tournaments have been held at the Junior Pan American Games since its first edition in 2021. The badminton program featured 3 events: boys and girls' singles and a mixed doubles.

== Summary ==
Games	Year	Venue	Events	Best Nation
I	2021	Pacific Valley Events Center, Yumbo, Valle, Colombia	3	Canada
II	2025	SND Stadium, Asunción, Paraguay	3	Canada

=== Medal table ===
Updated after the 2025 Junior Pan American Games.

Rank	Nation	Gold	Silver	Bronze	Total
1	Canada	5	1	0	6
2	Brazil	1	2	3	6
3	El Salvador	0	2	0	2
4	United States	0	1	4	5
5	Mexico	0	0	2	2
5	Peru	0	0	2	2
7	Argentina	0	0	1	1
Totals (7 entries)		6	6	12	24

== See also ==
- Badminton at the Pan American Games
- Badminton at the Youth Olympic Games
