= Sâmia Lima =

Brazilian badminton player (born 2000)

Personal information
- Born: Sâmia Raquel Passos Lima; 8 June 2000 (age 26) Teresina, Piauí, Brazil

Sport
- Country: Brazil
- Sport: Badminton
- Coached by: Right

Women's singles & doubles
- Highest ranking: 128 (WS 18 February 2020); 39 (WD with Jaqueline Lima, 27 December 2022); 157 (XD with Francielton Farias, 25 February 2020)
- Current ranking: 65 (WD with Jaqueline Lima, 27 October 2026)
- BWF profile
Medal record
Women's badminton
Representing Brazil
Pan American Games
Bronze medal – third place	2019 Lima	Women's doubles
Pan Am Championships
Bronze medal – third place	2019 Aguascalientes	Women's doubles
Bronze medal – third place	2024 Guatemala City	Women's doubles
Bronze medal – third place	2025 Lima	Women's doubles
Bronze medal – third place	2026 Lima	Women's doubles
Pan Am Mixed Team Championships
Silver medal – second place	2016 Campinas	Mixed team
Silver medal – second place	2017 Santo Domingo	Mixed team
Bronze medal – third place	2019 Lima	Mixed team
Bronze medal – third place	2023 Guadalajara	Mixed team
Bronze medal – third place	2025 Aguascalientes	Mixed team
Pan Am Female Cup
Bronze medal – third place	2020 Salvador	Women's team
Bronze medal – third place	2022 Acapulco	Women's team
Bronze medal – third place	2024 São Paulo	Women's team
Bronze medal – third place	2026 Guatemala City	Women's team
South American Games
Gold medal – first place	2022 Asunción	Mixed team
Silver medal – second place	2022 Asunción	Women's singles
Silver medal – second place	2022 Asunción	Women's doubles
Pan Am Junior Championships
Silver medal – second place	2014 Guatemala City	Mixed team
Silver medal – second place	2015 Tijuana	Mixed team
Silver medal – second place	2016 Lima	Mixed team
Silver medal – second place	2017 Markham	Mixed doubles
Silver medal – second place	2018 Salvador	Mixed team
Bronze medal – third place	2017 Markham	Mixed team
Bronze medal – third place	2018 Salvador	Girls' doubles

Sâmia Raquel Passos Lima (born 8 June 2000) is a Brazilian badminton player. As a junior player, she won the U-17 2016 Pan Am Junior Badminton Championships in the girls' and mixed doubles event. She won her first senior international title at the Brazil International Challenge tournament partnered with Jaqueline Lima. She was a bronze medalist in the women's doubles event at the 2019 Lima Pan American Games.

== Achievements ==
=== Pan American Games ===
Women's doubles
Year	Venue	Partner	Opponent	Score	Result
2019	Polideportivo 3 Lima, Peru	(Brazil) Jaqueline Lima	(United States) Keui-Ya Chen (United States) Jamie Hsu	21–17, 12–21, 18–21	Bronze

=== Pan Am Championships ===
Women's doubles
Year	Venue	Partner	Opponent	Score	Result
2019	Gimnasio Olímpico, Aguascalientes, Mexico	(Brazil) Jaqueline Lima	(Canada) Rachel Honderich (Canada) Kristen Tsai	17–21, 8–21	Bronze
2024	Teodoro Palacios Flores Gymnasium, Guatemala City, Guatemala	(Brazil) Jaqueline Lima	(United States) Annie Xu (United States) Kerry Xu	13–21, 14–21	Bronze
2025	Videna Poli 2, Lima, Peru	(Brazil) Jaqueline Lima	(Canada) Jackie Dent (Canada) Crystal Lai	10–21, 8–21	Bronze
2026	High Performance Center VIDENA, Lima, Peru	(Brazil) Jaqueline Lima	(United States) Lauren Lam (United States) Allison Lee	14–21, 9–21	Bronze

=== South American Games ===
Women's singles
Year	Venue	Opponent	Score	Result
2022	Estadio León Condou, Asunción, Paraguay	(Brazil) Jaqueline Lima	14–21, 10–21	Silver

Women's doubles
Year	Venue	Partner	Opponent	Score	Result
2022	Estadio León Condou; Asunción, Paraguay	(Brazil) Jaqueline Lima	(Brazil) Sânia Lima (Brazil) Juliana Viana Vieira	24–26, 13–21	Silver

=== Pan Am Junior Championships ===
Girls' doubles
Year	Venue	Partner	Opponent	Score	Result
2018	Centro Pan-Americano de Judô; Salvador, Brazil	(Brazil) Jaqueline Lima	(Canada) Crystal Lai (Canada) Wendy Zhang	11–21, 15–21	Bronze

Mixed doubles
Year	Venue	Partner	Opponent	Score	Result
2017	Markham Pan Am Centre; Markham, Canada	(Brazil) Fabrício Farias	(Canada) Brian Yang (Canada) Katie Ho-Shue	14–21, 11–21	Silver

=== BWF International Challenge/Series (15 titles, 12 runners-up) ===
Women's singles
Year	Tournament	Opponent	Score	Result
2021	Dominican Open	(Brazil) Juliana Viana Vieira	9–21, 17–21	(silver) Runner-up
2023	Santo Domingo Open	(Brazil) Juliana Viana Vieira	7–21, 3–21	(silver) Runner-up

Women's doubles
Year	Tournament	Partner	Opponent	Score	Result
2017	Brazil International	(Brazil) Jaqueline Lima	(Brazil) Thalita Correa (Brazil) Paloma Silva	14–21, 21–19, 21–15	(gold) Winner
2017	Peru International	(Brazil) Jaqueline Lima	(Peru) Daniela Macías (Peru) Dánica Nishimura	19–21, 20–22	(silver) Runner-up
2019	Peru International	(Brazil) Jaqueline Lima	(Guatemala) Diana Corleto (Guatemala) Nikté Sotomayor	15–21, 16–21	(silver) Runner-up
2019	Brazil Future Series	(Brazil) Jaqueline Lima	(Brazil) Mariana Pedrol Freitas (Brazil) Tamires Santos	21–15, 21–13	(gold) Winner
2019	Guatemala International	(Brazil) Jaqueline Lima	(Peru) Daniela Macías (Peru) Dánica Nishimura	21–19, 21–13	(gold) Winner
2019	Brazil International	(Brazil) Jaqueline Lima	(Brazil) Mariana Pedrol Freitas (Brazil) Bianca Lima	21–7, 21–10	(gold) Winner
2019	Santo Domingo Open	(Brazil) Jaqueline Lima	(Canada) Camille Leblanc (Canada) Alexandra Mocanu	21–12, 20–22, 30–29	(gold) Winner
2021	Brazil International	(Brazil) Jaqueline Lima	(Brazil) Sânia Lima (Brazil) Juliana Viana Vieira	15–21, 21–14, 21–17	(gold) Winner
2021	Dominican Open	(Brazil) Jaqueline Lima	(Brazil) Sânia Lima (Brazil) Tamires Santos	21–14, 21–12	(gold) Winner
2022	Brazil International	(Brazil) Jaqueline Lima	(Guatemala) Diana Corleto (Guatemala) Nikté Sotomayor	21–16, 23–21	(gold) Winner
2022	Peru International Series	(Brazil) Jaqueline Lima	(Brazil) Sânia Lima (Brazil) Tamires Santos	21–13, 21–13	(gold) Winner
2023	Santo Domingo Open	(Brazil) Jaqueline Lima	(Brazil) Sânia Lima (Brazil) Juliana Viana Vieira	16–21, 22–24	(silver) Runner-up
2023	Brazil International	(Brazil) Jaqueline Lima	(Mexico) Haramara Gaitán (Mexico) Sabrina Solis	21–11, 21–13	(gold) Winner
2023	Peru Challenge	(Brazil) Jaqueline Lima	(United States) Annie Xu (United States) Kerry Xu	11–21, 10–21	(silver) Runner-up
2024	Iran Fajr International	(Brazil) Jaqueline Lima	(Iran) Paria Eskandari (Iran) Romina Tajik	21–14, 21–11	(gold) Winner
2024	Perú International Series	(Brazil) Jaqueline Lima	(Guatemala) Diana Corleto (Guatemala) Nikté Sotomayor	21–11, 21–17	(gold) Winner
2024	El Salvador International	(Brazil) Jaqueline Lima	(Guatemala) Diana Corleto (Guatemala) Nikté Sotomayor	21–19, 21–12	(gold) Winner
2025	Perú International	(Brazil) Jaqueline Lima	(Peru) Fernanda Munar (Peru) Rafaela Munar	15–8, 15–8	(gold) Winner
2025	Guatemala International	(Brazil) Jaqueline Lima	(Japan) Mao Hatasue (Japan) Kanano Muroya	19–21, 16–21	(silver) Runner-up
2026	Brazil International	(Brazil) Jaqueline Lima	(Brazil) Sânia Lima (Brazil) Juliana Viana Vieira	13–21, 21–18, 21–14	(gold) Winner

Mixed doubles
Year	Tournament	Partner	Opponent	Score	Result
2019	Brazil Future Series	(Brazil) Artur Pomoceno	(Brazil) Fabrício Farias (Brazil) Jaqueline Lima	17–21, 16–21	(silver) Runner-up
2019	Brazil International	(Brazil) Francielton Farias	(Brazil) Fabrício Farias (Brazil) Jaqueline Lima	18–21, 18–21	(silver) Runner-up
2019	Santo Domingo Open	(Brazil) Francielton Farias	(Brazil) Fabrício Farias (Brazil) Jaqueline Lima	16–21, 16–21	(silver) Runner-up
2021	Brazil International	(Brazil) Artur Pomoceno	(Brazil) Fabrício Farias (Brazil) Jaqueline Lima	19–21, 12–21	(silver) Runner-up
2021	Dominican Open	(Brazil) Artur Pomoceno	(Brazil) Fabrício Farias (Brazil) Jaqueline Lima	22–24, 19–21	(silver) Runner-up

BWF International Challenge tournament
BWF International Series tournament
BWF Future Series tournament
