= 2025 U.S. Open (badminton) =

Badminton championships

Tournament details
- Dates: 24–29 June
- Edition: 60th
- Level: Super 300
- Total prize money: US$240,000
- Venue: Mid-America Center
- Location: Council Bluffs, Iowa, United States

Champions
- Men's singles: (India) Ayush Shetty
- Women's singles: (United States) Beiwen Zhang
- Men's doubles: (Chinese Taipei) Lai Po-yu (Chinese Taipei) Tsai Fu-cheng
- Women's doubles: (Thailand) Benyapa Aimsaard (Thailand) Nuntakarn Aimsaard
- Mixed doubles: (Denmark) Rasmus Espersen (Denmark) Amalie Cecilie Kudsk

The 2025 U.S. Open (officially known as the Yonex US Open 2025 for sponsorship reasons) was a badminton tournament which took place at Council Bluffs, Iowa, United States, from 24 to 29 June 2025 and had a total purse of $240,000.

== Tournament ==
The 2025 U.S. Open tournament was the fifteenth tournament of the 2025 BWF World Tour and also part of U.S. Open Badminton Championships which had been held since 1954 and is organized by the USA Badminton and sanctioned by the BWF.

=== Venue ===
The tournament was held at the Mid-America Center in Iowa, United States.

=== Point distribution ===
Below is the point distribution table for each phase of the tournament based on the BWF points system for the BWF World Tour Super 300 event.

Winner	Runner-up	3/4	5/8	9/16	17/32	33/64	65/128
7,000	5,950	4,900	3,850	2,750	1,670	660	320

=== Prize money ===
The total prize money for this tournament is US$240,000. The distribution of the prize money was in accordance with BWF regulations.

Event	Winner	Finalist	Semi-finals	Quarter-finals	Last 16
Singles	$18,000	$9,120	$3,480	$1,440	$840
Doubles	$18,960	$9,120	$3,360	$1,740	$900

== Men's singles ==
=== Seeds ===
1. (Chinese Taipei) Chou Tien-chen (semi-finals)
2. (Japan) Kenta Nishimoto (quarter-finals)
3. (Canada) Brian Yang (final)
4. (India) Ayush Shetty (champion)
5. (Chinese Taipei) Su Li-yang (second round)
6. (India) Priyanshu Rajawat (first round)
7. (Malaysia) Justin Hoh (second round)
8. (India) Srikanth Kidambi (first round)

=== Finals ===
Semi-finals
1	(Chinese Taipei) Chou Tien-chen	23	15	14
4	(India) Ayush Shetty	21	21	21
3	(Canada) Brian Yang	21	21
(Chinese Taipei) Liao Jhuo-fu	10	12

Final
4	(India) Ayush Shetty	21	21
3	(Canada) Brian Yang	18	13

=== Top half ===
==== Section 1 ====
First round
1	(Chinese Taipei) Chou T-c	24	21
(Finland) K Koljonen	22	15
(Vietnam) Nguyễn H Đ	21	17	21
(Denmark) M Christophersen	18	21	11
5	(Chinese Taipei) Su L-y	21	21
(Israel) M Zilberman	11	12
(Chinese Taipei) Wang P-w	15	22	14
(Canada) V Lai	21	20	21

Second round
1	(Chinese Taipei) Chou T-c	21	21
(Vietnam) Nguyễn H Đ	17	17
5	(Chinese Taipei) Su L-y	18	13
(Canada) V Lai	21	21

Quarter-finals
1	(Chinese Taipei) Chou T-c	21	21
(Canada) V Lai	19	8

==== Section 2 ====
First round
4	(India) A Shetty	21	21
(Denmark) M Johannesen	17	19
(France) A Merklé	21	18	18
(India) T Mannepalli	19	21	21
6	(India) P Rajawat	10	21	7
Q3	(Chinese Taipei) Ting Y-c	21	12	21
(Finland) J Oldorff	15	21	14
Q1	(Chinese Taipei) Kuo K-l	21	12	21

Second round
4	(India) A Shetty	21	13	21
(India) T Mannepalli	12	21	15
Q3	(Chinese Taipei) Ting Y-c	21	13	15
Q1	(Chinese Taipei) Kuo K-l	13	21	21

Quarter-finals
4	(India) A Shetty	22	21
Q1	(Chinese Taipei) Kuo K-l	20	9

=== Bottom half ===
==== Section 3 ====
First round
(Canada) XD Sheng	21	17	17
(Vietnam) Lê Đ P	17	21	21
(England) H Huang	21	12	21
8	(India) S Kidambi	19	21	14
(India) R Sanjeevi	18	12
Q4	(France) E Roy	21	21
(Chinese Taipei) Huang P-h	9	26	15
3	(Canada) B Yang	21	24	21

Second round
(Vietnam) Lê Đ P	13	16
(England) H Huang	21	21
Q4	(France) E Roy	17	21	17
3	(Canada) B Yang	21	12	21

Quarter-finals
(England) H Huang	9	14
3	(Canada) B Yang	21	21

==== Section 4 ====
First round
(Chinese Taipei) Liao J-f	21	21
(India) S Subramanian	13	19
(Belgium) J Carraggi	10	10
7	(Malaysia) J Hoh	21	21
(Chinese Taipei) Huang Y-k	21	11	21
Q2	(United States) G Tan	18	21	16
(Germany) M Kicklitz	6	15
2	(Japan) K Nishimoto	21	21

Second round
(Chinese Taipei) Liao J-f	21	9	21
7	(Malaysia) J Hoh	15	21	17
(Chinese Taipei) Huang Y-k	17	13
2	(Japan) K Nishimoto	21	21

Quarter-finals
(Chinese Taipei) Liao J-f	21	21
2	(Japan) K Nishimoto	18	8

== Women's singles ==
=== Seeds ===
1. (United States) Beiwen Zhang (champion)
2. (Vietnam) Nguyễn Thùy Linh (first round)
3. (Chinese Taipei) Sung Shuo-yun (quarter-finals)
4. (Chinese Taipei) Hsu Wen-chi (first round)
5. (Denmark) Julie Dawall Jakobsen (withdrew)
6. (Denmark) Line Christophersen (semi-finals)
7. (Ukraine) Polina Buhrova (semi-finals)
8. (Japan) Nozomi Okuhara (first round)

=== Finals ===
Semi-finals
1	(United States) Beiwen Zhang	18	21	21
6	(Denmark) Line Christophersen	21	16	15
7	(Ukraine) Polina Buhrova	14	16
(India) Tanvi Sharma	21	21

Final
1	(United States) Beiwen Zhang	21	16	21
(India) Tanvi Sharma	11	21	10

=== Top half ===
==== Section 1 ====
First round
1	(United States) BW Zhang	21	21
PFQ	(Chinese Taipei) Chen S-y	16	16
(Chinese Taipei) Huang Y-h	14	21	11
Q3	(Chinese Taipei) Hsieh Y-e	21	12	21
SWM	(Canada) W Y Zhang	21	21
(United States) I Jaiswal	19	15
Q1	(Switzerland) L Amiguet	17	11
(Germany) Y Li	21	21

Second round
1	(United States) BW Zhang	21	21
Q3	(Chinese Taipei) Hsieh Y-e	9	19
SWM	(Canada) W Y Zhang	17	11
(Germany) Y Li	21	21

Quarter-finals
1	(United States) BW Zhang	21	21
(Germany) Y Li	17	18

==== Section 2 ====
First round
4	(Chinese Taipei) Hsu W-c	17	21	20
Q4	(Malaysia) Wong L C	21	19	22
(Brazil) J Vieira	21	19	10
(Bulgaria) K Nalbantova	14	21	21
6	(Denmark) L Christophersen	21	21
(Canada) R Chan	13	16
(Czech Republic) T Švábíková	21	13	19
(India) A Kharb	16	21	21

Second round
Q4	(Malaysia) Wong L C	20	12
(Bulgaria) K Nalbantova	22	21
6	(Denmark) L Christophersen	23	21
(India) A Kharb	21	10

Quarter-finals
(Bulgaria) K Nalbantova	16	20
6	(Denmark) L Christophersen	21	22

=== Bottom half ===
==== Section 3 ====
First round
(Chinese Taipei) Hung Y-t	21	16	6^{r}
Q2	(India) I Sharma	12	21	6
(India) S Valishetty	16	21
7	(Ukraine) P Buhrova	21	23
(Denmark) A Schulz	10	24	21
(India) T Hemanth	21	22	16
(Chinese Taipei) Tung C-t	21	18	17
3	(Chinese Taipei) Sung S-y	11	21	21

Second round
Q2	(India) I Sharma	20	21	12
7	(Ukraine) P Buhrova	22	11	21
(Denmark) A Schulz	21	16	11
3	(Chinese Taipei) Sung S-y	17	21	21

Quarter-finals
7	(Ukraine) P Buhrova	8	21	21
3	(Chinese Taipei) Sung S-y	21	17	19

==== Section 4 ====
First round
(India) A Kashyap	21	21
(Chinese Taipei) Liang T-y	19	10
(Malaysia) Letshanaa K	21	21
8	(Japan) N Okuhara	8	19
(Thailand) P Opatniputh	21	21
(Chinese Taipei) Huang C-p	17	8
(India) T Sharma	21	21
2	(Vietnam) Nguyễn T L	19	9

Second round
(India) A Kashyap	17	22	13
(Malaysia) Letshanaa K	21	20	21
(Thailand) P Opatniputh	18	16
(India) T Sharma	21	21

Quarter-finals
(Malaysia) Letshanaa K	13	16
(India) T Sharma	21	21

== Men's doubles ==
=== Seeds ===
1. (Chinese Taipei) Lee Fang-chih / Lee Fang-jen (first round)
2. (United States) Chen Zhi-yi / Presley Smith (quarter-finals)
3. (India) Hariharan Amsakarunan / Ruban Kumar (quarter-finals)
4. (Scotland) Christopher Grimley / Matthew Grimley (second round)
5. (Canada) Kevin Lee / Ty Alexander Lindeman (first round)
6. (Chinese Taipei) Chen Zhi-ray / Lin Yu-chieh (quarter-finals)
7. (Denmark) William Kryger Boe / Christian Faust Kjær (first round)
8. (France) Maël Cattoen / Lucas Renoir (second round)

=== Finals ===
Semi-finals
(Chinese Taipei) Lai Po-yu (Chinese Taipei) Tsai Fu-cheng	21	21
(Chinese Taipei) Chiang Chien-wei (Chinese Taipei) Wu Hsuan-yi	13	19
(Chinese Taipei) Chen Cheng-kuan (Chinese Taipei) Lin Bing-wei	21	16	17
(Chinese Taipei) He Zhi-wei (Chinese Taipei) Huang Jui-hsuan	10	21	21

Final
(Chinese Taipei) Lai Po-yu (Chinese Taipei) Tsai Fu-cheng	21	21	21
(Chinese Taipei) He Zhi-wei (Chinese Taipei) Huang Jui-hsuan	13	23	15

=== Top half ===
==== Section 1 ====
First round
1	(Chinese Taipei) Lee F-c (Chinese Taipei) Lee F-j	21	18	15
(Chinese Taipei) Chang K-c (Chinese Taipei) Po L-w	6	21	21
(Chinese Taipei) Lai P-y (Chinese Taipei) Tsai F-c	21	18	21
(Germany) B Geiss (Germany) J R Jansen	19	21	17
6	(Chinese Taipei) Chen Z-r (Chinese Taipei) Lin Y-c	30	11	22
(Chinese Taipei) Wei C-w (Chinese Taipei) Yang P-c	29	21	20
(Brazil) I Batalha (Brazil) M Voigt	21	21
Q4	(Canada) B. R. Sankeerth (Canada) E O Holtzman	12	16

Second round
(Chinese Taipei) Chang K-c (Chinese Taipei) Po L-w	20	17
(Chinese Taipei) Lai P-y (Chinese Taipei) Tsai F-c	22	21
6	(Chinese Taipei) Chen Z-r (Chinese Taipei) Lin Y-c	21	21
(Brazil) I Batalha (Brazil) M Voigt	13	10

Quarter-finals
(Chinese Taipei) Lai P-y (Chinese Taipei) Tsai F-c	21	21
6	(Chinese Taipei) Chen Z-r (Chinese Taipei) Lin Y-c	16	11

==== Section 2 ====
First round
3	(India) H Amsakarunan (India) R Kumar	21	18	21
(Germany) M Bourakkadi (Germany) K Neumann	10	21	10
(Indonesia) T S C Hutomo (Indonesia) G C W Wijaya	15	22	16
(Canada) J Lai (Canada) N Yakura	21	20	21
8	(France) M Cattoen (France) L Renoir	21	21
(Spain) R García (Spain) C Piris	12	16
(Chinese Taipei) Su C-h (Chinese Taipei) Wu G-x	22	15
(Chinese Taipei) Chiang C-w (Chinese Taipei) Wu H-y	24	21

Second round
3	(India) H Amsakarunan (India) R Kumar	21	21
(Canada) J Lai (Canada) N Yakura	10	17
8	(France) M Cattoen (France) L Renoir	12	8
(Chinese Taipei) Chiang C-w (Chinese Taipei) Wu H-y	21	21

Quarter-finals
3	(India) H Amsakarunan (India) R Kumar	9	19
(Chinese Taipei) Chiang C-w (Chinese Taipei) Wu H-y	21	21

=== Bottom half ===
==== Section 3 ====
First round
(Brazil) F Farias (Brazil) D Silva	21	21
Q1	(Malaysia) M Razif A L (United States) A Liu	16	17
(Denmark) R Espersen (Denmark) A Søndergaard	19	21	21
7	(Denmark) W K Boe (Denmark) C F Kjær	21	18	15
(India) D S Konthoujam (India) A Mohammad	21	13	20
(Chinese Taipei) Chen C-k (Chinese Taipei) Lin B-w	10	21	22
Q2	(Canada) K M Deraj (Canada) V Ho	10	9
4	(Scotland) C Grimley (Scotland) M Grimley	21	21

Second round
(Brazil) F Farias (Brazil) D Silva	16	19
(Denmark) R Espersen (Denmark) A Søndergaard	21	21
(Chinese Taipei) Chen C-k (Chinese Taipei) Lin B-w	20	21	21
4	(Scotland) C Grimley (Scotland) M Grimley	22	18	13

Quarter-finals
(Denmark) R Espersen (Denmark) A Søndergaard	19	15
(Chinese Taipei) Chen C-k (Chinese Taipei) Lin B-w	21	21

==== Section 4 ====
First round
(Canada) M Ji (Canada) D Leung	13	17
(England) R Easton (England) A Green	21	21
(Chinese Taipei) He Z-w (Chinese Taipei) Huang J-h	21	10	21
5	(Canada) K Lee (Canada) T A Lindeman	16	21	17
(Czech Republic) J Král (Czech Republic) O Král	21	21
Q3	(United States) K Chong (United States) J H Lai	14	16
(India) A Mohanty (India) A Pattanayak	12	13
2	(United States) Chen Z-y (United States) P Smith	21	21

Second round
(England) R Easton (England) A Green	18	10
(Chinese Taipei) He Z-w (Chinese Taipei) Huang J-h	21	21
(Czech Republic) J Král (Czech Republic) O Král	13	20
2	(United States) Chen Z-y (United States) P Smith	21	22

Quarter-finals
(Chinese Taipei) He Z-w (Chinese Taipei) Huang J-h	21	21
2	(United States) Chen Z-y (United States) P Smith	15	15

== Women's doubles ==
=== Seeds ===
1. (Chinese Taipei) Hsu Yin-hui / Lin Jhih-yun (semi-finals)
2. (Chinese Taipei) Chang Ching-hui / Yang Ching-tun (semi-finals)
3. (Thailand) Benyapa Aimsaard / Nuntakarn Aimsaard (champions)
4. (Ukraine) Polina Buhrova / Yevheniia Kantemyr (second round)
5. (Chinese Taipei) Hu Ling-fang / Jheng Yu-chieh (quarter-finals)
6. (Chinese Taipei) Hsu Ya-ching / Sung Yu-hsuan (final)
7. (Canada) Jackie Dent / Crystal Lai (first round)
8. (India) Priya Konjengbam / Shruti Mishra (second round)

=== Finals ===
Semi-finals
1	(Chinese Taipei) Hsu Yin-hui (Chinese Taipei) Lin Jhih-yun	23	16
6	(Chinese Taipei) Hsu Ya-ching (Chinese Taipei) Sung Yu-hsuan	25	21
3	(Thailand) Benyapa Aimsaard (Thailand) Nuntakarn Aimsaard	21	21
2	(Chinese Taipei) Chang Ching-hui (Chinese Taipei) Yang Ching-tun	13	12

Final
6	(Chinese Taipei) Hsu Ya-ching (Chinese Taipei) Sung Yu-hsuan	15	15
3	(Thailand) Benyapa Aimsaard (Thailand) Nuntakarn Aimsaard	21	21

=== Top half ===
==== Section 1 ====
First round
(Indonesia) S Kani (United States) T Mertosono	21	22
(Brazil) J Lima (Brazil) S Lima	19	20
8	(India) P Konjengbam (India) S Mishra	21	21
(United States) M H Cruz (United States) S H Li	15	17
(United States) L Lam (United States) A Lee	21	21
(Denmark) S Pilgaard (Denmark) S Schulz	18	13

Second round
1	(Chinese Taipei) Hsu Y-h (Chinese Taipei) Lin J-y	16	21	21
(Indonesia) S Kani (United States) T Mertosono	21	10	15
8	(India) P Konjengbam (India) S Mishra	10	14
(United States) L Lam (United States) A Lee	21	21

Quarter-finals
1	(Chinese Taipei) Hsu Y-h (Chinese Taipei) Lin J-y	20	21	21
(United States) L Lam (United States) A Lee	22	13	7

==== Section 2 ====
First round
(England) A Lado (England) E van Leeuwen	21	22	14
(United States) A Chang (United States) J Yeung	10	24	21
6	(Chinese Taipei) Hsu Y-c (Chinese Taipei) Sung Y-h	21	21
(Chinese Taipei) Chen S-y (Chinese Taipei) Hsieh Y-e	14	19
(Germany) L Michalski (Germany) T P Nguyen	21	21
(United States) C Ho (United States) K Ngo	14	15

Second round
4	(Ukraine) P Buhrova (Ukraine) Y Kantemyr	21	11	15
(United States) A Chang (United States) J Yeung	18	21	21
6	(Chinese Taipei) Hsu Y-c (Chinese Taipei) Sung Y-h	21	21
(Germany) L Michalski (Germany) T P Nguyen	10	14

Quarter-finals
(United States) A Chang (United States) J Yeung	14	17
6	(Chinese Taipei) Hsu Y-c (Chinese Taipei) Sung Y-h	21	21

=== Bottom half ===
==== Section 3 ====
First round
(Chinese Taipei) Hung H-e (Chinese Taipei) Lee C-c	18	12
(Denmark) N Anthonisen (Denmark) A C Kudsk	21	21
(Denmark) K Vang (Denmark) M Werge	17	20
5	(Chinese Taipei) Hu L-f (Chinese Taipei) Jheng Y-c	21	22
(Canada) E Kwan (Canada) J Rymes	10	7
(England) A Harris (England) L Tolman	21	21
(Chinese Taipei) Hung Y-e (Chinese Taipei) Lin Y-y	14	9
3	(Thailand) B Aimsaard (Thailand) N Aimsaard	21	21

Second round
(Denmark) N Anthonisen (Denmark) A C Kudsk	11	25	19
5	(Chinese Taipei) Hu L-f (Chinese Taipei) Jheng Y-c	21	23	21
(England) A Harris (England) L Tolman	7	11
3	(Thailand) B Aimsaard (Thailand) N Aimsaard	21	21

Quarter-finals
5	(Chinese Taipei) Hu L-f (Chinese Taipei) Jheng Y-c	14	21	18
3	(Thailand) B Aimsaard (Thailand) N Aimsaard	21	19	21

==== Section 4 ====
First round
(Spain) C Azurmendi (Spain) L Rodríguez	21	17	18
(Switzerland) L Amiguet (Switzerland) C Racloz	14	21	21
(Chinese Taipei) Chen Y-f (Chinese Taipei) Sun L-c	21	11	22
7	(Canada) J Dent (Canada) C Lai	17	21	20
(Australia) G Somerville (Australia) A Yu	21	19	21
(United States) F Corbett (United States) J Gai	15	21	19

Second round
(Switzerland) L Amiguet (Switzerland) C Racloz	14	12
(Chinese Taipei) Chen Y-f (Chinese Taipei) Sun L-c	21	21
(Australia) G Somerville (Australia) A Yu	13	21
2	(Chinese Taipei) Chang C-h (Chinese Taipei) Yang C-t	21	23

Quarter-finals
(Chinese Taipei) Chen Y-f (Chinese Taipei) Sun L-c	20	14
2	(Chinese Taipei) Chang C-h (Chinese Taipei) Yang C-t	22	21

== Mixed doubles ==
=== Seeds ===
1. (India) Dhruv Kapila / Tanisha Crasto (first round)
2. (Thailand) Ruttanapak Oupthong / Jhenicha Sudjaipraparat (final)
3. (Chinese Taipei) Chen Cheng-kuan / Hsu Yin-hui (semi-finals)
4. (England) Callum Hemming / Estelle van Leeuwen (quarter-finals)
5. (Denmark) Rasmus Espersen / Amalie Cecilie Kudsk (champions)
6. (United States) Presley Smith / Jennie Gai (semi-finals)
7. (Canada) Kevin Lee / Josephine Wu (second round)
8. (United States) Chen Zhi-yi / Francesca Corbett (first round)

=== Finals ===
Semi-finals
5	(Denmark) Rasmus Espersen (Denmark) Amalie Cecilie Kudsk	21	21
3	(Chinese Taipei) Chen Cheng-kuan (Chinese Taipei) Hsu Yin-hui	17	14
6	(United States) Presley Smith (United States) Jennie Gai	12	18
2	(Thailand) Ruttanapak Oupthong (Thailand) Jhenicha Sudjaipraparat	21	21

Final
5	(Denmark) Rasmus Espersen (Denmark) Amalie Cecilie Kudsk	21	13	21
2	(Thailand) Ruttanapak Oupthong (Thailand) Jhenicha Sudjaipraparat	17	21	10

=== Top half ===
==== Section 1 ====
First round
1	(India) D Kapila (India) T Crasto	21	16	17
Q1	(Chinese Taipei) Lin Y-c (Chinese Taipei) Hung Y-e	17	21	21
(Czech Republic) O Král (Czech Republic) T Švábíková	18	18
Q4	(Chinese Taipei) Chang K-c (Chinese Taipei) Lin J-y	21	21
5	(Denmark) R Espersen (Denmark) A C Kudsk	21	19	21
Q3	(Chinese Taipei) Tsai F-c (Chinese Taipei) Sung Y-h	17	21	9
(Canada) J Lai (Canada) C Lai	18	13
(Malaysia) I Syazmil (United States) C Ho	21	21

Second round
Q1	(Chinese Taipei) Lin Y-c (Chinese Taipei) Hung Y-e	21	21
Q4	(Chinese Taipei) Chang K-c (Chinese Taipei) Lin J-y	16	16
5	(Denmark) R Espersen (Denmark) A C Kudsk	21	21
(Malaysia) I Syazmil (United States) C Ho	10	13

Quarter-finals
Q1	(Chinese Taipei) Lin Y-c (Chinese Taipei) Hung Y-e	15	14
5	(Denmark) R Espersen (Denmark) A C Kudsk	21	21

==== Section 2 ====
First round
3	(Chinese Taipei) Chen C-k (Chinese Taipei) Hsu Y-h	20	24	21
(Chinese Taipei) Wu G-x (Chinese Taipei) Lee C-h	22	22	18
(Brazil) D Silva (Brazil) S Lima	11	17
(England) R Easton (England) L Tolman	21	21
7	(Canada) K Lee (Canada) J Wu	21	21
PFQ	(Chinese Taipei) Chen Z-r (Chinese Taipei) Yang C-t	16	17
(Spain) R García (Spain) L Rodríguez	17	13
(Germany) M Seidel (Germany) T P Nguyen	21	21

Second round
3	(Chinese Taipei) Chen C-k (Chinese Taipei) Hsu Y-h	21	21
(England) R Easton (England) L Tolman	10	18
7	(Canada) K Lee (Canada) J Wu	22	21	15
(Germany) M Seidel (Germany) T P Nguyen	24	18	21

Quarter-finals
3	(Chinese Taipei) Chen C-k (Chinese Taipei) Hsu Y-h	21	21
(Germany) M Seidel (Germany) T P Nguyen	16	17

=== Bottom half ===
==== Section 3 ====
First round
Q2	(Canada) T A Lindeman (Canada) J Cheung	17	17
(Chinese Taipei) Po L-w (Chinese Taipei) Chang C-h	21	21
(Chinese Taipei) Lin B-w (Chinese Taipei) Lee C-c	13	13
6	(United States) P Smith (United States) J Gai	21	21
(France) G Deschamp (France) M Lambert	21	22
(Germany) J C Völker (Germany) S Küespert	13	20
(Brazil) F Farias (Brazil) J Lima	26	16
4	(England) C Hemming (England) E van Leeuwen	28	21

Second round
(Chinese Taipei) Po L-w (Chinese Taipei) Chang C-h	15	16
6	(United States) P Smith (United States) J Gai	21	21
(France) G Deschamp (France) M Lambert	18	19
4	(England) C Hemming (England) E van Leeuwen	21	21

Quarter-finals
6	(United States) P Smith (United States) J Gai	14	21	21
4	(England) C Hemming (England) E van Leeuwen	21	8	17

==== Section 4 ====
First round
(Guatemala) C Martínez (Guatemala) D Corleto	21	15	21
(India) A Agarwal (India) S Mishra	15	21	16
(Germany) M Bourakkadi (Germany) L Michalski	21	25
8	(United States) Chen Z-y (United States) F Corbett	12	23
PFQ	(Chinese Taipei) He Z-w (Chinese Taipei) Chen Y-f	24	21
(Denmark) K Kolding (Denmark) M Werge	22	17
(Indonesia) G C W Wijaya (Indonesia) S Kani	10	14
2	(Thailand) R Oupthong (Thailand) J Sudjaipraparat	21	21

Second round
(Guatemala) C Martínez (Guatemala) D Corleto	13	16
(Germany) M Bourakkadi (Germany) L Michalski	21	21
PFQ	(Chinese Taipei) He Z-w (Chinese Taipei) Chen Y-f	8	16
2	(Thailand) R Oupthong (Thailand) J Sudjaipraparat	21	21

Quarter-finals
(Germany) M Bourakkadi (Germany) L Michalski	17	10
2	(Thailand) R Oupthong (Thailand) J Sudjaipraparat	21	21

Preceded by 2025 Indonesia Open	BWF World Tour; 2025 BWF season	Succeeded by 2025 Canada Open
