= 2022 Pan Am Male & Female Badminton Cup =

Tournament details
- Dates: 17–20 February 2022
- Venue: Mundo Imperial
- Location: Acapulco, Mexico

The 2022 Pan Am Male & Female Badminton Cup was a continental badminton championships tournament to crown the best men's and women's team for the Americas. It was held in Acapulco, Mexico from 17 to 20 February.

== Tournament ==
The team event of 2022 Pan Am Badminton Championships officially Pan Am M&F Cup 2022, is a continental qualification tournament of 2022 Thomas & Uber Cup, and also to crown the best men's and women's badminton team in Pan America. This event organized by the Badminton Pan America and Federacion Mexicana de Badminton. 12 teams, consisting of 6 men's teams and 6 women's teams entered the tournament.

=== Venue ===
- The team event is being held at Mundo Imperial in the city of Acapulco, Mexico.

== Medalists ==
Event	Gold	Silver	Bronze
Men's team	Canada; B. R. Sankeerth; Victor Lai; Kevin Lee; Ty Alexander Lindeman; Josh Nguyen; Imran Wadia; Nyl Yakura; Brian Yang	Brazil; Izak Batalha; Ygor Coelho; Fabricio Farias; Francielton Farias; Jonathan Matias; Donnians Oliveira; Artur Pomoceno; Davi Silva; Deivid Silva; Matheus Voigt	Mexico; Andrés López; Job Castillo; Armando Gaitán; Luis Ramón Garrido; Sebastián Martínez; Luis Montoya; Rodrigo Morales; Lino Muñoz; Gerardo Saavedra
Women's team	United States; Natalie Chi; Francesca Corbett; Jennie Gai; Lauren Lam; Allison Lee; Kodi Tang Lee; Sanchita Pandey; Esther Shi	Canada; Rachel Chan; Catherine Choi; Rachel Honderich; Crystal Lai; Camille Leblanc; Alexandra Mocanu; Talia Ng; Josephine Wu; Eliana Zhang; Wen Yu Zhang	Brazil; Jeisiane Alves; Jaqueline Lima; Sâmia Lima; Sania Lima; Tamires Santos; Juliana Vieira

=== Medal table ===
* Host nation (Mexico)

Rank	Nation	Gold	Silver	Bronze	Total
1	Canada	1	1	0	2
2	United States	1	0	0	1
3	Brazil	0	1	1	2
4	Mexico*	0	0	1	1
Totals (4 entries)		2	2	2	6

== Male Cup ==
=== Group A ===
Pos	Team	Pld	W	L	MF	MA	MD	GF	GA	GD	PF	PA	PD	Pts	Qualification
1	Canada	2	2	0	9	1	+8	19	6	+13	502	413	+89	2	Semifinals
2	United States	2	1	1	5	5	0	12	12	0	431	447	−16	1	Semifinals
3	Guatemala	2	0	2	1	9	−8	6	19	−13	413	486	−73	0	5th place

Source: TS
- Canada vs United States

Canada
4
Mundo Imperial, Court 4
17 February 2022, 09:00 UTC−6

United States
1

			1	2	3
1	(Canada) (United States)	Brian Yang; Enrico Asuncion	21; 15	21; 12
2	(Canada) (United States)	Victor Lai; Don Henley	21; 23	21; 14	21; 15
3	(Canada) (United States)	Josh Nguyen; William Hu	25; 23	21; 12
4	(Canada) (United States)	B. R. Sankeerth / Nyl Yakura; Vinson Chiu / Joshua Yuan	18; 21	21; 12	17; 21
5	(Canada) (United States)	Kevin Lee / Ty Alexander Lindeman; Adrian King-Sun Mar / Henry Tang	21; 13	21; 17

- Guatemala vs United States

Guatemala
1
Mundo Imperial, Court 2
17 February 2022, 16:00 UTC−6

United States
4

			1	2	3
1	(Guatemala) (United States)	Kevin Cordón; Howard Shu	21; 13	15; 21	21; 5
2	(Guatemala) (United States)	Rubén Castellanos; Enrico Asuncion	21; 23	12; 21
3	(Guatemala) (United States)	Christopher Martínez; William Hu	23; 21	22; 24	6; 21
4	(Guatemala) (United States)	Aníbal Marroquín / Jonathan Solís; Vinson Chiu / Joshua Yuan	8; 21	18; 21
5	(Guatemala) (United States)	Rubén Castellanos / Christopher Martínez; Enrico Asuncion / Don Henley	14; 21	17; 21

- Canada vs Guatemala

Canada
5
Mundo Imperial, Court 2
18 February 2022, 09:00 UTC−6

Guatemala
0

			1	2	3
1	(Canada) (Guatemala)	Brian Yang; Kevin Cordón	21; 11	17; 21	21; 8
2	(Canada) (Guatemala)	B. R. Sankeerth; Rubén Castellanos	21; 18	7; 21	21; 17
3	(Canada) (Guatemala)	Josh Nguyen; Christopher Martínez	21; 16	21; 12
4	(Canada) (Guatemala)	Victor Lai / Nyl Yakura; Jonathan Solís / Aníbal Marroquín	21; 19	21; 16
5	(Canada) (Guatemala)	Kevin Lee / Ty Alexander Lindeman; Rubén Castellanos / Christopher Martínez	21; 18	19; 21	21; 17

=== Group B ===
Pos	Team	Pld	W	L	MF	MA	MD	GF	GA	GD	PF	PA	PD	Pts	Qualification
1	Brazil	2	2	0	8	2	+6	18	6	+12	475	350	+125	2	Semifinals
2	Mexico	2	1	1	7	3	+4	15	9	+6	445	404	+41	1	Semifinals
3	Peru	2	0	2	0	10	−10	2	20	−18	293	459	−166	0	5th place

Source: TS
- Mexico vs Brazil

Mexico
2
Mundo Imperial, Court 2
17 February 2022, 09:00 UTC−6

Brazil
3

			1	2	3
1	(Mexico) (Brazil)	Lino Muñoz; Ygor Coelho	16; 21	23; 21	11; 21
2	(Mexico) (Brazil)	Luis Montoya; Jonathan Matias	9; 21	13; 21
3	(Mexico) (Brazil)	Job Castillo; Donnians Oliveira	17; 21	21; 9	21; 15
4	(Mexico) (Brazil)	Armando Gaitán / Lino Muñoz; Jonathan Matias / Artur Pomoceno	11; 21	12; 21
5	(Mexico) (Brazil)	Job Castillo / Luis Montoya; Fabricio Farias / Francielton Farias	19; 21	21; 18	21; 15

- Peru vs Brazil

Peru
0
Mundo Imperial, Court 4
17 February 2022, 16:00 UTC−6

Brazil
5

			1	2	3
1	(Peru) (Brazil)	José Guevara; Ygor Coelho	14; 21	11; 21
2	(Peru) (Brazil)	Brian Roque; Jonathan Matias	7; 21	8; 21
3	(Peru) (Brazil)	Adriano Viale; Donnians Oliveira	10; 21	21; 19	8; 21
4	(Peru) (Brazil)	José Guevara / Diego Subauste; Fabricio Farias / Matheus Voigt	15; 21	14; 21
5	(Peru) (Brazil)	Remo Blondet / Adriano Viale; Jonathan Matias / Artur Pomoceno	11; 21	16; 21

- Mexico vs Peru

Mexico
5
Mundo Imperial, Court 3
18 February 2022, 09:00 UTC−6

Peru
0

			1	2	3
1	(Mexico) (Peru)	Lino Muñoz; José Guevara	21; 14	21; 13
2	(Mexico) (Peru)	Luis Montoya; Brian Roque	21; 15	17; 21	21; 6
3	(Mexico) (Peru)	Armando Gaitán; Adriano Viale	23; 21	21; 8
4	(Mexico) (Peru)	Sebastián Martínez / Rodrigo Morales; Remo Blondet / Brian Roque	21; 15	22; 20
5	(Mexico) (Peru)	Job Castillo / Luis Montoya; Diego Subauste / Adriano Viale	21; 7	21; 18

=== Fifth place match ===
- Guatemala vs Peru

Guatemala
3
Mundo Imperial, Court 3
18 February 2022, 16:00 UTC−6

Peru
1

			1	2	3
1	(Guatemala) (Peru)	Kevin Cordón; José Guevara	21; 17	21; 15
2	(Guatemala) (Peru)	Rubén Castellanos; Brian Roque	21; 8	21; 7
3	(Guatemala) (Peru)	Christopher Martínez; Adriano Viale	11; 21	6; 21
4	(Guatemala) (Peru)	Aníbal Marroquín / Jonathan Solís; José Guevara / Diego Subauste Tokumura	21; 8	21; 18
5	(Guatemala) (Peru)	Rubén Castellanos / Christopher Martínez; Brian Roque / Adriano Viale				not played

=== First to fourth place ===
Semi-finals
19 February
Canada	3
Mexico	1
19 February
United States	0
Brazil	3

Final
20 February
Canada	3
Brazil	2
Third place
20 February
Mexico	3
United States	0

==== Semifinals ====
- Canada vs Mexico

Canada
3
Mundo Imperial, Court 3
19 February 2020, 9:00 UTC−6

Mexico
1

			1	2	3
1	(Canada) (Mexico)	Brian Yang; Lino Muñoz	24; 22	21; 8
2	(Canada) (Mexico)	B. R. Sankeerth; Luis Montoya	21; 13	21; 19
3	(Canada) (Mexico)	Victor Lai; Job Castillo	10; 21	22; 20	16; 21
4	(Canada) (Mexico)	Kevin Lee / Ty Alexander Lindeman; Sebastián Martínez / Lino Muñoz	21; 13	15; 21	21; 16
5	(Canada) (Mexico)	B. R. Sankeerth / Nyl Yakura; Job Castillo / Luis Montoya				not played

- United States vs Brazil

United States
0
Mundo Imperial, Court 2
19 February 2020, 9:00 UTC−6

Brazil
3

			1	2	3
1	(United States) (Brazil)	Howard Shu; Ygor Coelho	6; 21	14; 21
2	(United States) (Brazil)	Enrico Asuncion; Jonathan Matias	9; 21	19; 21
3	(United States) (Brazil)	Don Henley Averia; Donnians Oliveira	16; 21	12; 21
4	(United States) (Brazil)	Vinson Chiu / Joshua Yuan; Fabricio Farias / Francielton Farias				not played
5	(United States) (Brazil)	Enrico Asuncion / William Hu; Jonathan Matias / Artur Silva Pomoceno				not played

=== Third place match ===
- Mexico vs United States

Mexico
3
Mundo Imperial, Court 1
20 February 2022, 08:30

United States
0

			1	2	3
1	(Mexico) (United States)	Lino Muñoz; Enrico Asuncion	21; 17	15; 21	21; 11
2	(Mexico) (United States)	Luis Montoya; Don Henley Averia	23; 21	21; 18
3	(Mexico) (United States)	Job Castillo; William Hu	21; 17	20; 22	21; 16
4	(Mexico) (United States)	Sebastián Martínez / Lino Muñoz; Adrian King-Sun Mar / Henry Tang				not played
5	(Mexico) (United States)	Job Castillo / Luis Montoya; Vinson Chiu / Joshua Yuan				not played

=== Final ===
- Canada vs Brazil

Canada
3
Mundo Imperial, Court 2
20 February 2022, 11:00

Brazil
2

			1	2	3
1	(Canada) (Brazil)	Brian Yang; Ygor Coelho	21; 15	10; 21	14; 21
2	(Canada) (Brazil)	B. R. Sankeerth; Jonathan Matias	23; 25	22; 20	22; 20
3	(Canada) (Brazil)	Victor Lai; Donnians Oliveira	19; 21	21; 18	13; 21
4	(Canada) (Brazil)	Nyl Yakura / Brian Yang; Fabricio Farias / Francielton Farias	21; 17	21; 19
5	(Canada) (Brazil)	Kevin Lee / Ty Alexander Lindeman; Jonathan Matias / Artur Pomoceno	21; 18	21; 9

== Female Cup ==
=== Group A ===
Pos	Team	Pld	W	L	MF	MA	MD	GF	GA	GD	PF	PA	PD	Pts	Qualification
1	Canada	2	2	0	10	0	+10	20	2	+18	454	253	+201	2	Semifinals
2	Guatemala	2	1	1	5	5	0	9	12	−3	311	393	−82	1	Semifinals
3	Peru	2	0	2	0	10	−10	3	18	−15	302	421	−119	0	5th place

Source: TS
- Canada vs Guatemala

Canada
5
Mundo Imperial, Court 1
17 February 2022, 09:00 UTC−6

Guatemala
0

			1	2	3
1	(Canada) (Guatemala)	Zhang Wenyu; Nikté Sotomayor	21; 15	21; 9
2	(Canada) (Guatemala)	Camille Leblanc; Alejandra Paiz	21; 6	15; 21	21; 10
3	(Canada) (Guatemala)	Eliana Zhang; Mariana Paiz	21; 4	21; 7
4	(Canada) (Guatemala)	Catherine Choi / Josephine Wu; Diana Corleto / Nikté Sotomayor	21; 10	21; 19
5	(Canada) (Guatemala)	Crystal Lai / Alexandra Mocanu; Alejandra Paiz / Mariana Paiz	21; 5	21; 13

- Peru vs Guatemala

Peru
0
Mundo Imperial, Court 1
17 February 2022, 16:00 UTC−6

Guatemala
5

			1	2	3
1	(Peru) (Guatemala)	Inés Castillo; Nikté Sotomayor	19; 21	16; 21
2	(Peru) (Guatemala)	Fernanda Munar; Alejandra Paiz	21; 15	11; 21	14; 21
3	(Peru) (Guatemala)	Rafaela Munar; Diana Corleto	17; 21	16; 21
4	(Peru) (Guatemala)	Inés Castillor / Paula la Torre; Diana Corleto / Nikté Sotomayor	14; 21	21; 9	19; 21
5	(Peru) (Guatemala)	Fernanda Munar / Rafaela Munar; Alejandra Paiz / Mariana Paiz

- Canada vs Peru

Canada
5
Mundo Imperial, Court 4
18 February 2022, 09:00 UTC−6

Peru
0

			1	2	3
1	(Canada) (Peru)	Zhang Wenyu; Inés Castillo	21; 14	19; 21	21; 14
2	(Canada) (Peru)	Camille Leblanc; Namie Miyahira	21; 13	21; 12
3	(Canada) (Peru)	Eliana Zhang; Rafaela Munar	21; 6	21; 10
4	(Canada) (Peru)	Catherine Choi / Josephine Wu; Inés Castillo / Paula la Torre	21; 10	21; 19
5	(Canada) (Peru)	Crystal Lai / Alexandra Mocanu; Namie Miyahira / Rafaela Munar	21; 8	21; 7

=== Group B ===
Pos	Team	Pld	W	L	MF	MA	MD	GF	GA	GD	PF	PA	PD	Pts	Qualification
1	United States	2	2	0	10	0	+10	20	1	+19	432	256	+176	2	Semifinals
2	Brazil	2	1	1	3	7	−4	8	15	−7	367	422	−55	1	Semifinals
3	Mexico	2	0	2	2	8	−6	5	17	−12	312	433	−121	0	5th place

Source: TS
- United States vs Mexico

United States
5
Mundo Imperial, Court 3
17 February 2022, 09:00 UTC−6

Mexico
0

			1	2	3
1	(United States) (Mexico)	Lauren Lam; Haramara Gaitán	21; 8	21; 16
2	(United States) (Mexico)	Jennie Gai; Sabrina Solís	21; 13	21; 14
3	(United States) (Mexico)	Natalie Chi; Vanessa García	21; 11	21; 10
4	(United States) (Mexico)	Francesca Corbett / Allison Lee; Romina Fregoso / Miriam Rodríguez	21; 10	21; 14
5	(United States) (Mexico)	Jennie Gai / Sanchita Pandey; Haramara Gaitán / Vanessa García	21; 10	21; 6

- Brazil vs Mexico

Brazil
3
Mundo Imperial, Court 3
17 February 2022, 16:00 UTC−6

Mexico
2

			1	2	3
1	(Brazil) (Mexico)	Jaqueline Lima; Haramara Gaitán	12; 21	15; 21
2	(Brazil) (Mexico)	Sâmia Lima; Sabrina Solís	19; 21	21; 11	8; 21
3	(Brazil) (Mexico)	Juliana Vieira; Vanessa García	21; 16	21; 13
4	(Brazil) (Mexico)	Sania Lima / Tamires Santos; Paula Lozoya / Fatima Rio	21; 14	21; 12
5	(Brazil) (Mexico)	Jaqueline Lima / Sâmia Lima; Romina Fregoso / Miriam Rodríguez	21; 17	22; 24	21; 9

- United States vs Brazil

United States
5
Mundo Imperial, Court 1
18 February 2022, 09:00 UTC−6

Brazil
0

			1	2	3
1	(United States) (Brazil)	Lauren Lam; Jaqueline Lima	21; 6	21; 13
2	(United States) (Brazil)	Esther Shi; Juliana Vieira	21; 6	12; 21	21; 13
3	(United States) (Brazil)	Natalie Chi; Jeisiane Alves	21; 2	21; 19
4	(United States) (Brazil)	Lauren Lam / Kodi Tang Lee; Jaqueline Lima / Sâmia Lima	21; 17	21; 19
5	(United States) (Brazil)	Jennie Gai / Sanchita Pandey; Sania Lima / Tamires Santos	21; 12	21; 16

=== Fifth place match ===
- Peru vs Mexico

Peru
1
Mundo Imperial, Court 2
18 February 2022, 16:00 UTC−6

Mexico
3

			1	2	3
1	(Peru) (Mexico)	Fernanda Saponara; Haramara Gaitán	18; 21	11; 21
2	(Peru) (Mexico)	Inés Castillo; Sabrina Solís	21; 13	19; 21	21; 10
3	(Peru) (Mexico)	Namie Miyahira; Vanessa García	11; 21	9; 21
4	(Peru) (Mexico)	Inés Castillo / Paula la Torre; Romina Fregoso / Miriam Rodríguez	15; 21	21; 19	16; 21
5	(Peru) (Mexico)	Rafaela Munar / Fernanda Saponara; Jessica Bautista / Sabrina Solís				not played

=== First to fourth place ===
Semi-finals
19 February
Canada	3
Guatemala	0
19 February
Brazil	0
United States	3

Final
20 February
Canada	0
United States	3
Third place
20 February
Guatemala	0
Brazil	3

==== Semifinals ====
- Canada vs Guatemala

Canada
3
Mundo Imperial, Court 1
19 February 2020, 16:00 UTC−6

Guatemala
0

			1	2	3
1	(Canada) (Guatemala)	Zhang Wenyu; Nikté Sotomayor	21; 13	22; 20
2	(Canada) (Guatemala)	Camille Leblanc; Alejandra Paiz	21; 12	21; 7
3	(Canada) (Guatemala)	Eliana Zhang; Diana Corleto	21; 9	21; 14
4	(Canada) (Guatemala)	Crystal Lai / Alexandra Mocanu; Alejandra Paiz / Mariana Paiz				not played
5	(Canada) (Guatemala)	Catherine Choi / Josephine Wu; Diana Corleto / Nikté Sotomayor				not played

- Brazil vs United States

Brazil
0
Mundo Imperial, Court 2
19 February 2020, 16:00 UTC−6

United States
3

			1	2	3
1	(Brazil) (United States)	Jaqueline Lima; Jennie Gai	4; 21	9; 21
2	(Brazil) (United States)	Sâmia Lima; Esther Shi	17; 21	22; 24
3	(Brazil) (United States)	Juliana Vieira; Natalie Chi	14; 21	18; 21
4	(Brazil) (United States)	Jaqueline Lima / Sâmia Lima; Francesca Corbett / Allison Lee				not played
5	(Brazil) (United States)	Sania Lima / Tamires Santos; Jennie Gai / Sanchita Pandey				not played

=== Third place match ===
- Guatemala vs Brazil

Guatemala
0
Mundo Imperial, Court 2
20 February 2022, 08:30

Brazil
3

			1	2	3
1	(Guatemala) (Brazil)	Nikté Sotomayor; Jaqueline Lima	21; 15	10; 21	19; 21
2	(Guatemala) (Brazil)	Alejandra Paiz; Sâmia Lima	16; 21	20; 22
3	(Guatemala) (Brazil)	Mariana IPaiz; Juliana Vieira	6; 21	12; 21
4	(Guatemala) (Brazil)	Diana Corleto / Nikté Sotomayor; Jaqueline Lima / Sâmia Lima				not played
5	(Guatemala) (Brazil)	Alejandra Paiz / Mariana Paiz; Sania Lima / Tamires Santos				not played

=== Final ===
- Canada vs United States

Canada
0
Mundo Imperial, Court 1
20 February 2022, 11:00

United States
3

			1	2	3
1	(Canada) (United States)	Zhang Wenyu; Lauren Lam	17; 21	21; 18	20; 22
2	(Canada) (United States)	Camille Leblanc; Jennie Gai	5; 21	6; 21
3	(Canada) (United States)	Eliana Zhang; Natalie Chi	15; 21	15; 21
4	(Canada) (United States)	Catherine Choi / Crystal Lai; Francesca Corbett / Allison Lee				not played
5	(Canada) (United States)	Josephine Wu / Eliana Zhang; Jennie Gai / Sanchita Pandey				not played
