= 2022 Pan Am Badminton Championships =

Tournament details
- Dates: 26–29 April 2022
- Edition: 25th
- Venue: Palacio de los Deportes Carlos "El Famoso" Hernández
- Location: San Salvador, El Salvador

Champions
- Men's singles: (Guatemala) Kevin Cordón
- Women's singles: (Canada) Michelle Li
- Men's doubles: (Mexico) Job Castillo (Mexico) Luis Montoya
- Women's doubles: (Canada) Rachel Honderich (Canada) Kristen Tsai
- Mixed doubles: (Canada) Ty Alexander Lindeman (Canada) Josephine Wu

The XXIV 2022 Pan Am Badminton Championships was a continental championships tournament of badminton for the Americas. It was held in San Salvador, El Salvador from 26 to 29 April.

== Tournament ==
The individual event of 2022 Pan Am Badminton Championships was a 25th edition of the Pan American Badminton Championships.

=== Venue ===
- The individual event is being held at Palacio de los Deportes Carlos "El Famoso" Hernández in the city of San Salvador, El Salvador.

=== Point distribution ===
Below is the tables with the point distribution for each phase of the tournament based on the BWF points system for the Pan American Badminton Championships, which is equivalent to a Super 300 event.

Winner	Runner-up	3/4	5/8	9/16	17/32	33/64
7,000	5,950	4,900	3,850	2,750	1,670	660

== Medalists ==
Event	Gold	Silver	Bronze
Men's singles	(Guatemala) Kevin Cordón	(Canada) Brian Yang	(Brazil) Ygor Coelho
Men's singles	(Guatemala) Kevin Cordón	(Canada) Brian Yang	(El Salvador) Uriel Canjura
Women's singles	(Canada) Michelle Li	(United States) Beiwen Zhang	(United States) Iris Wang
Women's singles	(Canada) Michelle Li	(United States) Beiwen Zhang	(Canada) Rachel Chan
Men's doubles	(Mexico) Job Castillo (Mexico) Luis Montoya	(United States) Vinson Chiu (United States) Joshua Yuan	(Canada) Kevin Lee (Canada) Ty Alexander Lindeman
Men's doubles	(Mexico) Job Castillo (Mexico) Luis Montoya	(United States) Vinson Chiu (United States) Joshua Yuan	(Canada) Adam Dong (Canada) Nyl Yakura
Women's doubles	(Canada) Rachel Honderich (Canada) Kristen Tsai	(Canada) Catherine Choi (Canada) Josephine Wu	(Brazil) Sania Lima (Brazil) Tamires Santos
Women's doubles	(Canada) Rachel Honderich (Canada) Kristen Tsai	(Canada) Catherine Choi (Canada) Josephine Wu	(United States) Francesca Corbett (United States) Allison Lee
Mixed doubles	(Canada) Ty Alexander Lindeman (Canada) Josephine Wu	(Guatemala) Jonathan Solís (Guatemala) Diana Corleto	(Canada) Nyl Yakura (Canada) Crystal Lai
Mixed doubles	(Canada) Ty Alexander Lindeman (Canada) Josephine Wu	(Guatemala) Jonathan Solís (Guatemala) Diana Corleto	(Brazil) Davi Silva (Brazil) Sania Lima

=== Medal table ===
* Host nation (El Salvador)

Rank	Nation	Gold	Silver	Bronze	Total
1	Canada	3	2	4	9
2	Guatemala	1	1	0	2
3	Mexico	1	0	0	1
4	United States	0	2	2	4
5	Brazil	0	0	3	3
6	El Salvador*	0	0	1	1
Totals (6 entries)		5	5	10	20

== Individual event ==
=== Men's singles ===
==== Seeds ====
1. (Canada) Brian Yang (final)
2. (Guatemala) Kevin Cordón (champion)
3. (Canada) Jason Ho-Shue (quarter-finals)
4. (Brazil) Ygor Coelho (semi-finals)
5. (Mexico) Lino Muñoz (third round)
6. (Canada) B. R. Sankeerth (quarter-finals)
7. (Mexico) Luis Montoya (second round)
8. (Mexico) Job Castillo (quarter-finals)

==== Finals ====
Semi-finals
1	(Canada) Brian Yang	17	21	21
4	(Brazil) Ygor Coelho	21	10	8
(El Salvador) Uriel Canjura	18	21	13
2	(Guatemala) Kevin Cordón	21	18	21

Final
1	(Canada) Brian Yang	17	14
2	(Guatemala) Kevin Cordón	21	21

==== Top half ====
===== Section 1 =====
First Round
(Mexico) A Gaitan	21	21
(Costa Rica) M Castillo	5	6
(Dominican Republic) A Ortiz	18	22	21
(Jamaica) M Williams	21	20	23
(Brazil) D Oliveira	21	21
(Costa Rica) G Cavallotti	8	5
(Jamaica) B Evans
(Venezuela) M Quijada	w	/	o
(Colombia) E Rodriguez	1	7
(United States) H Shu	21	21

Second Round
1	(Canada) B Yang	21	21
(Mexico) A Gaitan	13	11
(Guyana) N Ramdhani	21	21
(Jamaica) M Williams	8	15
7	(Mexico) L Montoya	18	17
(Brazil) D Oliveira	21	21
(Venezuela) M Quijada	18	12
(United States) H Shu	21	21

Third Round
1	(Canada) B Yang	21	21
(Guyana) N Ramdhani	2	8
(Brazil) D Oliveira	21	21
(United States) H Shu	15	15

Quarter-finals
1	(Canada) B Yang	21	21
(Brazil) D Oliveira	13	12

===== Section 2 =====
First Round
(Peru) D la Torre	16	15
(United States) D H Averia	21	21
(El Salvador) J Alas	21	21
(Dominican Republic) D Acosta	5	16
(Barbados) K King	9	7
(Argentina) N Oliva	21	21
(Ecuador) J Huebla
(Guyana) A Haynes	w	/	o
(United States) J Ma	21	21
(El Salvador) K Suria	8	11

Second Round
4	(Brazil) Y Coelho	21	21
(United States) D H Averia	17	6
(Guatemala) R Castellanos	21	21
(El Salvador) J Alas	10	12
8	(Mexico) J Castillo	21	21
(Argentina) N Oliva	16	13
(Guyana) A Haynes	12	4
(United States) J Ma	21	21

Third Round
4	(Brazil) Y Coelho	21	22
(Guatemala) R Castellanos	8	20
8	(Mexico) J Castillo	21	21
(United States) J Ma	18	16

Quarter-finals
4	(Brazil) Y Coelho	21	21
8	(Mexico) J Castillo	7	12

==== Bottom half ====
===== Section 3 =====
First Round
(Guatemala) J Ochoa	11	8
(El Salvador) U Canjura	21	21
(Ecuador) A Baque
(Barbados) G Robinson	w	/	o
(El Salvador) C Rodriguez	19	21	21
(Guyana) T Jeffrey	21	6	6
(Costa Rica) R Mora	3	5
(Trinidad and Tobago) N Bonkowsky	21	21
(Dominican Republic) A Mariñez	12	2
(Brazil) J Matias	21	21
(El Salvador) V García	10	14
(Peru) A Viale	21	21

Second Round
(El Salvador) U Canjura	w	/	o
(Barbados) G Robinson
(El Salvador) C Rodriguez	1	3
5	(Mexico) L Muñoz	21	21
(Trinidad and Tobago) N Bonkowsky	10	10
(Brazil) J Matias	21	21
(Peru) A Viale	17	12
3	(Canada) J Ho-Shue	21	21

Third Round
(El Salvador) U Canjura	21	12	22
5	(Mexico) L Muñoz	18	21	20
(Brazil) J Matias	22	18	15
3	(Canada) J Ho-Shue	20	21	21

Quarter-finals
(El Salvador) U Canjura	21	21
3	(Canada) J Ho-Shue	19	19

===== Section 4 =====
First Round
(Canada) V Lai	21	21
(El Salvador) M Mejia	8	5
(Argentina) S Otero	21	21
(Venezuela) F Barrios	18	16
(Peru) J Guevara	18	14
(United States) E Asuncion	21	21
(Barbados) D Forde	2	8
(Brazil) A S Pomoceno	21	21
(Guatemala) Y del Cid	21	21
(Dominican Republic) E Zorrilla	11	5

Second Round
(Canada) V Lai	21	21
(Argentina) S Otero	6	5
(United States) E Asuncion	16	6
6	(Canada) B. R. Sankeerth	21	21
(Brazil) A S Pomoceno	w	/	o
(Jamaica) S Ricketts
(Guatemala) Y del Cid	9	10
2	(Guatemala) K Cordón	21	21

Third Round
(Canada) V Lai	21	20	14
6	(Canada) B. R. Sankeerth	19	22	21
(Brazil) A S Pomoceno	7	14
2	(Guatemala) K Cordón	21	21

Quarter-finals
6	(Canada) B. R. Sankeerth	19	20
2	(Guatemala) K Cordón	21	22

=== Women's singles ===
==== Seeds ====
1. (Canada) Michelle Li (champion)
2. (United States) Beiwen Zhang (final)
3. (United States) Iris Wang (semi-finals)
4. (United States) Lauren Lam (third round)
5. (Canada) Zhang Wenyu (quarter-finals)
6. (Mexico) Haramara Gaitan (quarter-finals)
7. (Canada) Talia Ng (quarter-finals)
8. (Guatemala) Nikté Sotomayor (third round)

==== Finals ====
Semi-finals
1	(Canada) Michelle Li	21	21
3	(United States) Iris Wang	14	18
(Canada) Rachel Chan	19	22	6
2	(United States) Beiwen Zhang	21	20	21

Final
1	(Canada) Michelle Li	21	16	25
2	(United States) Beiwen Zhang	18	21	23

==== Top half ====
===== Section 1 =====
First Round
(Jamaica) K Wynter
(Mexico) J Bautista	w	/	o
(Venezuela) D Ortiz	12	21	10
(Peru) N Miyahira	21	16	21
(Brazil) J Lima	21	21
(Ecuador) M Zambrano	5	10
(Brazil) J Alves	21	21	21
(El Salvador) F Centeno	23	19	15

Second Round
1	(Canada) M Li	21	21
(Mexico) J Bautista	6	8
(Argentina) A Oliva	17	16
(Peru) N Miyahira	21	21
6	(Mexico) H Gaitan	17	21	21
(Brazil) J Lima	21	9	10
(Dominican Republic) N A Jiménez	24	17	15
(Brazil) J Alves	22	21	21

Third Round
1	(Canada) M Li	21	21
(Peru) N Miyahira	11	7
6	(Mexico) H Gaitan	21	20	21
(Brazil) J Alves	15	22	12

Quarter-finals
1	(Canada) M Li	21	21
6	(Mexico) H Gaitan	19	9

===== Section 2 =====
First Round
(Guatemala) K Orellana	21	21
(Guyana) P Ramdhani	13	17
(Barbados) T Williams	21	21
(El Salvador) M Revelo	19	11
(Mexico) V García	21	21
(Barbados) M Riviera	9	10
(Guatemala) L Santizo	21	18	19
(Venezuela) D Mendoza	16	21	21

Second Round
3	(United States) I Wang	21	21
(Guatemala) K Orellana	8	7
(El Salvador) W Nayeli	15	11
(Barbados) T Williams	21	21
8	(Guatemala) N Sotomayor	21	12	21
(Mexico) V García	17	21	14
(Peru) I Castillo	21	21
(Venezuela) D Mendoza	10	14

Third Round
3	(United States) I Wang	21	21
(Barbados) T Williams	6	6
8	(Guatemala) N Sotomayor	17	21	16
(Peru) I Castillo	21	14	21

Quarter-finals
3	(United States) I Wang	21	21
(Peru) I Castillo	9	8

==== Bottom half ====
===== Section 3 =====
First Round
(El Salvador) I Saldaña	7	8
(Barbados) S Scott	21	21
(Ecuador) C Choez
(Argentina) I Gualdi	w	/	o
(Mexico) S Solis	21	21
(Dominican Republic) J Acosta	11	10
(Ecuador) N Tapia
(Dominican Republic) D Acosta	w	/	o
(El Salvador) D Hernández	11	6
(Peru) F Saponara	21	21

Second Round
(Barbados) S Scott	10	11
(Argentina) I Gualdi	21	21
(Mexico) S Solis	10	16
5	(Canada) Zhang WY	21	21
(Dominican Republic) D Acosta	6	9
(Canada) R Chan	21	21
(Peru) F Saponara	10	11
4	(United States) L Lam	21	21

Third Round
(Argentina) I Gualdi	7	8
5	(Canada) Zhang WY	21	21
(Canada) R Chan	21	21
4	(United States) L Lam	19	17

Quarter-finals
5	(Canada) Zhang WY	17	16
(Canada) R Chan	21	21

===== Section 4 =====
First Round
(Brazil) J V Vieira	21	21
(El Salvador) G Barrios	2	5
(Venezuela) T Sánchez	16	21	12
(Dominican Republic) C Pie	21	9	21
(Colombia) J Giraldo	10	19
(Guatemala) A Paiz	21	21
(Trinidad and Tobago) C De Boulet	10	21	15
(Costa Rica) C Zapata	21	15	21

Second Round
(Brazil) J V Vieira	21	21
(Brazil) S Lima	12	4
(Dominican Republic) C Pie	5	5
7	(Canada) T Ng	21	21
(Guatemala) A Paiz	21	21
(Jamaica) T Richardson	12	19
(Costa Rica) C Zapata	3	5
2	(United States) BW Zhang	21	21

Third Round
(Brazil) J V Vieira	18	12
7	(Canada) T Ng	21	21
(Guatemala) A Paiz	9	17
2	(United States) BW Zhang	21	21

Quarter-finals
7	(Canada) T Ng	19	19
2	(United States) BW Zhang	21	21

=== Men's doubles ===
==== Seeds ====
1. (Guatemala) Aníbal Marroquín / Jonathan Solís (second round)
2. (Mexico) Job Castillo / Luis Montoya (champions)
3. (Guatemala) Rubén Castellanos / Christopher Martínez (second round)
4. (Barbados) Shae Michael Martin / Gavin Robinson (withdrew)

==== Finals ====
Semi-finals
(Canada) Kevin Lee (Canada) Ty Alexander Lindeman	14	16
(United States) Vinson Chiu (United States) Joshua Yuan	21	21
(Canada) Adam Dong (Canada) Nyl Yakura	21	19	13
2	(Mexico) Job Castillo (Mexico) Luis Montoya	17	21	21

Final
(United States) Vinson Chiu (United States) Joshua Yuan	20	8^{r}
2	(Mexico) Job Castillo (Mexico) Luis Montoya	22	11

==== Top half ====
===== Section 1 =====
First round
(Canada) K Lee (Canada) T A Lindeman	21	21
(Guyana) A Haynes (Guyana) T Jeffrey	6	9
(Mexico) S Martínez (Mexico) R Morales	21	21
(El Salvador) M Mejia (El Salvador) K Suria	8	12

Second round
1	(Guatemala) A Marroquín (Guatemala) J Solís	21	12	12
(Canada) K Lee (Canada) T A Lindeman	13	21	21
(El Salvador) J Duran (El Salvador) J Orellana	5	14
(Mexico) S Martínez (Mexico) R Morales	21	21

Quarter-finals
(Canada) K Lee (Canada) T A Lindeman	21	21
(Mexico) S Martínez (Mexico) R Morales	19	14

===== Section 2 =====
First round
(Ecuador) A Baque (Ecuador) J Huebla
(Dominican Republic) A Ortiz (Dominican Republic) E Zorrilla	w	/	o
(Brazil) J Matias (Brazil) D Silva	21	13	15
(United States) V Chiu (United States) J Yuan	19	21	21
(Peru) J Guevara (Peru) D Mini	21	21
(Venezuela) J Calanche (Venezuela) M Quijada	11	5

Second round
4	(Barbados) S M Martin (Barbados) G Robinson
(Dominican Republic) A Ortiz (Dominican Republic) E Zorrilla	w	/	o
(United States) V Chiu (United States) J Yuan	21	21
(Peru) J Guevara (Peru) D Mini	19	11

Quarter-finals
(Dominican Republic) A Ortiz (Dominican Republic) E Zorrilla	9	12
(United States) V Chiu (United States) J Yuan	21	21

==== Bottom half ====
===== Section 3 =====
First round
(Dominican Republic) D Acosta (Dominican Republic) A Mariñez	16	15
(Argentina) N Oliva (Argentina) S Otero	21	21
(Brazil) F Farias (Brazil) D Silva	14	20
(United States) E Asuncion (United States) D H Averia	21	22
(Peru) D la Torre (Peru) D Tokumura	15	17
(Canada) A Dong (Canada) N Yakura	21	21

Second round
(Argentina) N Oliva (Argentina) S Otero	7	21	17
(United States) E Asuncion (United States) D H Averia	21	18	21
(Canada) A Dong (Canada) N Yakura	21	17	21
3	(Guatemala) R Castellanos (Guatemala) C Martínez	18	21	17

Quarter-finals
(United States) E Asuncion (United States) D H Averia	12	16
(Canada) A Dong (Canada) N Yakura	21	21

===== Section 4 =====
First round
(El Salvador) V García (El Salvador) C Rodriguez	22	18	23
(Barbados) D Forde (Barbados) K King	20	21	21
(Jamaica) B Evans (Jamaica) M Williams
(Trinidad and Tobago) N Bonkowsky (Guyana) N Ramdhani	w	/	o
(Costa Rica) M Castillo (Costa Rica) G Cavallotti	11	12
(Venezuela) F Barrios (Venezuela) W Barrios	21	21

Second round
(El Salvador) V García (El Salvador) C Rodriguez	16	18
(Trinidad and Tobago) N Bonkowsky (Guyana) N Ramdhani	21	21
(Venezuela) F Barrios (Venezuela) W Barrios	15	9
2	(Mexico) J Castillo (Mexico) L Montoya	21	21

Quarter-finals
(Trinidad and Tobago) N Bonkowsky (Guyana) N Ramdhani	14	7
2	(Mexico) J Castillo (Mexico) L Montoya	21	21

=== Women's doubles ===
==== Seeds ====
1. (Canada) Rachel Honderich / Kristen Tsai (champions)
2. (Canada) Catherine Choi / Josephine Wu (final)
3. (Brazil) Jaqueline Lima / Sâmia Lima (second round)
4. (Guatemala) Diana Corleto / Nikté Sotomayor (second round)

==== Finals ====
Semi-finals
1	(Canada) Rachel Honderich (Canada) Kristen Tsai	21	21
(Brazil) Sania Lima (Brazil) Tamires Santos	11	15
(United States) Francesca Corbett (United States) Allison Lee	18	13
2	(Canada) Catherine Choi (Canada) Josephine Wu	21	21

Final
1	(Canada) Rachel Honderich (Canada) Kristen Tsai	21	21
2	(Canada) Catherine Choi (Canada) Josephine Wu	17	18

==== Top half ====
===== Section 1 =====
First round
(Barbados) M Riviera (Barbados) T Williams	w	/	o
(Barbados) S Scott (Jamaica) K Wynter

Second round
1	(Canada) R Honderich (Canada) K Tsai	21	21
(United States) L Lam (United States) K T Lee	9	10
(El Salvador) G Barrios (El Salvador) M Revelo	7	14
(Barbados) M Riviera (Barbados) T Williams	21	21

Quarter-finals
1	(Canada) R Honderich (Canada) K Tsai	21	21
(Barbados) M Riviera (Barbados) T Williams	2	8

===== Section 2 =====
First round
(Dominican Republic) A Acosta (Dominican Republic) D Acosta	10	8
(Brazil) S Lima (Brazil) T Santos	21	21
(Peru) I Castillo (Peru) P la Torre	21	21
(Mexico) R Fregoso (Mexico) M Rodríguez	16	12

Second round
4	(Guatemala) D Corleto (Guatemala) N Sotomayor	21	8	12
(Brazil) S Lima (Brazil) T Santos	19	21	21
(Ecuador) C Choez (Ecuador) N Tapia
(Peru) I Castillo (Peru) P la Torre	w	/	o

Quarter-finals
(Brazil) S Lima (Brazil) T Santos	21	21
(Peru) I Castillo (Peru) P la Torre	9	17

==== Bottom half ====
===== Section 3 =====
First round
(Peru) N Miyahira (Peru) F Saponara	21	11	21
(Dominican Republic) N A Jiménez (Dominican Republic) C Pie	11	21	14
(Mexico) H Gaitan (Mexico) V García	12	11
(United States) F Corbett (United States) A Lee	21	21

Second round
(Peru) N Miyahira (Peru) F Saponara	21	21
(El Salvador) W Nayeli (El Salvador) I Saldaña	7	6
(United States) F Corbett (United States) A Lee	21	21
3	(Brazil) J Lima (Brazil) S Lima	12	13

Quarter-finals
(Peru) N Miyahira (Peru) F Saponara	7	8
(United States) F Corbett (United States) A Lee	21	21

===== Section 4 =====
First round
(Guatemala) A Paiz (Guatemala) M Paiz	21	21
(Argentina) I Gualdi (Argentina) A Oliva	10	4

Second round
(Guatemala) A Paiz (Guatemala) M Paiz	21	21
(Venezuela) D Mendoza (Venezuela) D Ortiz	12	10
(El Salvador) F Centeno (El Salvador) D Hernández	4	8
2	(Canada) C Choi (Canada) J Wu	21	21

Quarter-finals
(Guatemala) A Paiz (Guatemala) M Paiz	9	10
2	(Canada) C Choi (Canada) J Wu	21	21

=== Mixed doubles ===
==== Seeds ====
1. (Brazil) Fabricio Farias / Jaqueline Lima (quarter-finals)
2. (Guatemala) Jonathan Solís / Diana Corleto (final)
3. (United States) Vinson Chiu / Jennie Gai (Quarter finals)
4. (Canada) Nicolas Nguyen / Alexandra Mocanu (quarter-finals)
5. (Guatemala) Christopher Martínez / Mariana Paiz (second round)
6. (Canada) Ty Alexander Lindeman / Josephine Wu (champions)
7. (Ecuador) Andy Baque / Maria Delia Zambrano (withdrew)
8. (El Salvador) José Orellana / Daniela Hernández (second round)

==== Finals ====
Semi-finals
(Canada) Nyl Yakura (Canada) Crystal Lai	14	15
6	(Canada) Ty Alexander Lindeman (Canada) Josephine Wu	21	21
(Brazil) Davi Silva (Brazil) Sania Lima	12	18
2	(Guatemala) Jonathan Solís (Guatemala) Diana Corleto	21	21

Final
6	(Canada) Ty Alexander Lindeman (Canada) Josephine Wu	21	21
2	(Guatemala) Jonathan Solís (Guatemala) Diana Corleto	12	11

==== Top half ====
===== Section 1 =====
First Round
(Venezuela) M Quijada (Venezuela) T Sánchez	21	21
(Dominican Republic) A Ortiz (Dominican Republic) C Pie	8	13
(Canada) N Yakura (Canada) C Lai	21	21
(Peru) D Tokumura (Peru) F Saponara	11	10
(Costa Rica) R Mora (Costa Rica) C Zapata	9	16
(Dominican Republic) E Zorrilla (Dominican Republic) D Acosta	21	21

Second Round
1	(Brazil) F Farias (Brazil) J Lima	21	17	21
(Brazil) D Silva (Brazil) S Lima	18	21	19
(Mexico) R Morales (Mexico) R Fregoso	21	21
(Venezuela) M Quijada (Venezuela) T Sánchez	19	17
5	(Guatemala) C Martínez (Guatemala) M Paiz	22	18
(Canada) N Yakura (Canada) C Lai	24	21
(Colombia) E Rodriguez (Colombia) J Giraldo	21	13	21
(Dominican Republic) E Zorrilla (Dominican Republic) D Acosta	19	21	13

Third Round
1	(Brazil) F Farias (Brazil) J Lima	21	21
(Mexico) R Morales (Mexico) R Fregoso	8	7
(Canada) N Yakura (Canada) C Lai	21	21
(Colombia) E Rodriguez (Colombia) J Giraldo	5	9

Quarter-finals
1	(Brazil) F Farias (Brazil) J Lima	19	16
(Canada) N Yakura (Canada) C Lai	21	21

===== Section 2 =====
First Round
(Mexico) S Martínez (Mexico) M Rodríguez	21	21
(Dominican Republic) A Mariñez (Dominican Republic) N Jiménez	15	13
(Barbados) K King (Barbados) T Williams	w	/	o
(Jamaica) S Ricketts (Jamaica) T Richardson
(Barbados) G Robinson (Barbados) M Riviera	17	17
(Guyana) N Ramdhani (Guyana) P Ramdhani	21	21

Second Round
3	(United States) V Chiu (United States) J Gai	21	21
(El Salvador) J Alas (El Salvador) F Centeno	6	4
(Argentina) S Otero (Argentina) A Oliva	10	19
(Mexico) S Martínez (Mexico) M Rodríguez	21	21
6	(Canada) T A Lindeman (Canada) J Wu	21	21
(Barbados) K King (Barbados) T Williams	8	12
(Ecuador) J Huebla (Ecuador) N Tapia
(Guyana) N Ramdhani (Guyana) P Ramdhani	w	/	o

Third Round
3	(United States) V Chiu (United States) J Gai	21	21
(Mexico) S Martínez (Mexico) M Rodríguez	11	17
6	(Canada) T A Lindeman (Canada) J Wu	21	21
(Guyana) N Ramdhani (Guyana) P Ramdhani	11	9

Quarter-finals
3	(United States) V Chiu (United States) J Gai	24	17
6	(Canada) T A Lindeman (Canada) J Wu	26	21

==== Bottom half ====
===== Section 3 =====
First Round
(Trinidad and Tobago) N Bonkowsky (Trinidad and Tobago) C De Boulet	5	12
(United States) T Tan (United States) E Shi	21	21
(Venezuela) F Barrios (Venezuela) D Ortiz	6	11
(Brazil) D Silva (Brazil) S Lima	21	21
(Mexico) G Saavedra (Mexico) F Rio	21	21
(Venezuela) W Barrios (Venezuela) D Mendoza	13	7
(El Salvador) J Duran (El Salvador) M Revelo	w	/	o
(Barbados) S Martin (Barbados) S Scott

Second Round
(United States) T Tan (United States) E Shi	17	19
(Peru) D Mini (Peru) P la Torre	21	21
(Brazil) D Silva (Brazil) S Lima	21	21
8	(El Salvador) J Orellana (El Salvador) D Hernández	5	5
(Mexico) G Saavedra (Mexico) F Rio	19	15
(United States) J Yuan (United States) A Lee	21	21
(El Salvador) J Duran (El Salvador) M Revelo	7	2
4	(Canada) N Nguyen (Canada) A Mocanu	21	21

Third Round
(Peru) D Mini (Peru) P la Torre	16	21	12
(Brazil) D Silva (Brazil) S Lima	21	18	21
(United States) J Yuan (United States) A Lee	20	21	22
4	(Canada) N Nguyen (Canada) A Mocanu	22	19	24

Quarter-finals
(Brazil) D Silva (Brazil) S Lima	21	21
4	(Canada) N Nguyen (Canada) A Mocanu	13	12

===== Section 4 =====
First Round
(Mexico) A Martinez (Mexico) Vanessa García
(Peru) D la Torre (Peru) N Miyahira	w	/	o
(Canada) A Dong (Canada) E Zhang	21	22	21
(Brazil) M Voigt (Brazil) T Santos	11	24	14
(El Salvador) E Suria (El Salvador) W Nayeli	10	10
(Argentina) N Oliva (Argentina) I Gualdi	21	21

Second Round
(Peru) D la Torre (Peru) N Miyahira	15	21	21
(Peru) J Guevara (Peru) I Castillo	21	12	23
(Canada) A Dong (Canada) E Zhang	w	/	o
7	(Ecuador) A Baque (Ecuador) M Zambrano
(Argentina) N Oliva (Argentina) I Gualdi	w	/	o
(Dominican Republic) D Acosta (Dominican Republic) J Acosta
(El Salvador) M Calzadilla (El Salvador) G Barrios	6	6
2	(Guatemala) J Solís (Guatemala) D Corleto	21	21

Third Round
(Peru) J Guevara (Peru) I Castillo	11	9
(Canada) A Dong (Canada) E Zhang	21	21
(Argentina) N Oliva (Argentina) I Gualdi	14	8
2	(Guatemala) J Solís (Guatemala) D Corleto	21	21

Quarter-finals
(Canada) A Dong (Canada) E Zhang	21	18	14
2	(Guatemala) J Solís (Guatemala) D Corleto	17	21	21
