= Adam Mendrek =

Czech badminton player (born 1995)

Personal information
- Born: 14 November 1995 (age 30) Český Těšín, Czech Republic
- Height: 1.72 m (5 ft 8 in)
- Weight: 74 kg (163 lb)

Sport
- Country: Czech Republic
- Sport: Badminton
- Handedness: Right
- Coached by: Tomasz Mendrek; Lennart Engler; David Nerud

Men's singles & doubles
- Highest ranking: 91 (MS, 28 June 2018); 43 (MD with Ondřej Král, 6 August 2024); 440 (XD with Kate Foo Kune, 30 August 2018)
- BWF profile

Adam Mendrek (born 14 November 1995) is a Czech badminton player. He competed in the 2024 Paris Olympics.

== Career ==
In 2015, he won the men's singles event at the Lithuanian International.

== Achievements ==
=== BWF International Challenge/Series (3 titles, 8 runners-up) ===
Men's singles
Year	Tournament	Opponent	Score	Result
2015	Lithuanian International	(Lithuania) Kęstutis Navickas	22–20, 6–21, 21–18	(gold) Winner
2016	Egypt International	(Czech Republic) Milan Ludík	13–21, 20–22	(silver) Runner-up
2017	Jamaica International	(Denmark) Søren Toft	14–21, 21–14, 20–22	(silver) Runner-up
2018	Cameroon International	(Mexico) Luis Ramón Garrido	19–21, 9–21	(silver) Runner-up
2018	Côte d'Ivoire International	(Mexico) Luis Ramón Garrido	15–21, 9–21	(silver) Runner-up

Men's doubles
Year	Tournament	Partner	Opponent	Score	Result
2017	Brazil International	(Germany) Jonathan Persson	(Russia) Evgenij Dremin (Russia) Denis Grachev	17–21, 16–21	(silver) Runner-up
2021	Hellas International	(Czech Republic) Ondřej Král	(Malaysia) Junaidi Arif (Malaysia) Muhammad Haikal	16–21, 15–21	(silver) Runner-up
2022	Mexican International	(Czech Republic) Ondřej Král	(United States) Vinson Chiu (United States) Joshua Yuan	22–20, 21–19	(gold) Winner
2022	El Salvador International	(Czech Republic) Ondřej Král	(Canada) Kevin Lee (Canada) Ty Alexander Lindeman	19–21, 21–17, 18–21	(silver) Runner-up
2023	Czech Open	(Czech Republic) Ondřej Král	(United States) Chen Zhi-yi (United States) Presley Smith	15–21, 11–21	(silver) Runner-up
2024	Azerbaijan International	(Czech Republic) Ondřej Král	(India) P. S. Ravikrishna (India) Sankar Prasad Udayakumar	21–14, 21–19	(gold) Winner

BWF International Challenge tournament
BWF International Series tournament
BWF Future Series tournament
