= Joshua Yuan (badminton) =

American badminton player (born 2003)

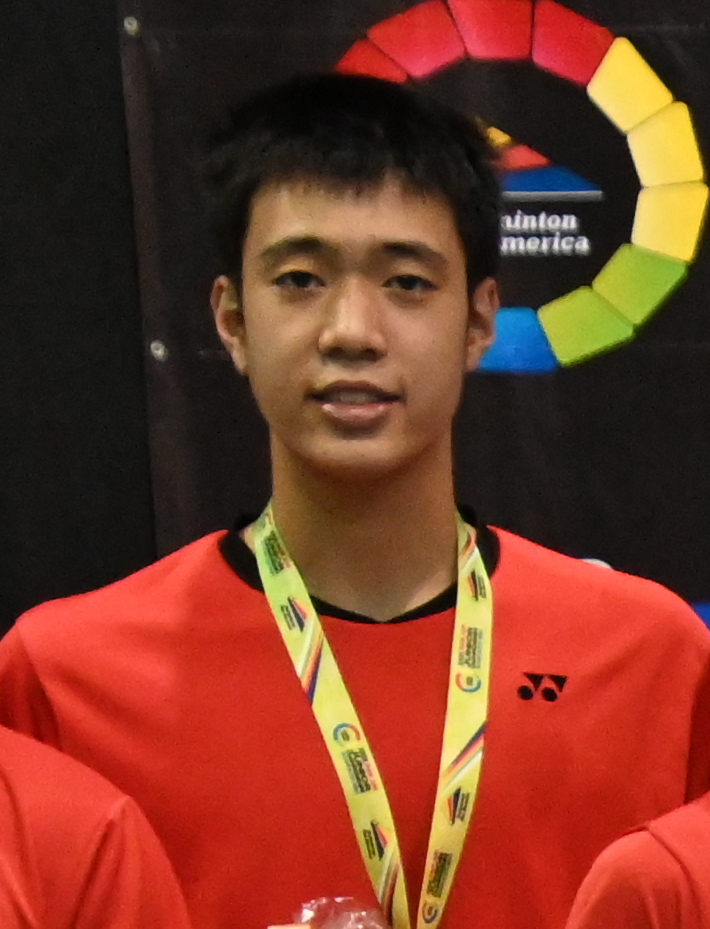
- Yuan at the 2021 Pan Am Junior Championships

Personal information
- Born: July 25, 2003 (age 23) San Mateo, California, U.S.
- Height: 6 ft 1 in (185 cm)

Sport
- Country: United States
- Sport: Badminton
- Handedness: Right

Men's & mixed doubles
- Highest ranking: 41 (MD with Vinson Chiu, May 21, 2024); 79 (XD with Allison Lee, February 14, 2023)
- Current ranking: 47 (MD with Vinson Chiu); 224 (XD with Chloe Ho) (August 6, 2024)
- BWF profile
Medal record
Men's badminton
Representing the United States
Pan Am Championships
| Silver medal – second place | 2022 San Salvador | Men's doubles |
| Bronze medal – third place | 2023 Kingston | Men's doubles |
| Bronze medal – third place | 2024 Guatemala City | Men's doubles |
Pan Am Mixed Team Championships
| Silver medal – second place | 2023 Guadalajara | Mixed team |
Pan Am Junior Championships
| Gold medal – first place | 2021 Acapulco | Mixed team |
| Gold medal – first place | 2021 Acapulco | Mixed doubles |
| Bronze medal – third place | 2019 Moncton | Boys' doubles |

Joshua Yuan (born July 25, 2003) is an American badminton player. He won a silver medal with his partner Vinson Chiu in the men's doubles at the 2022 Pan Am Championships. Joshua was also a gold medalist in mixed doubles at the 2019 Pan Am Junior Badminton Championships.

== Career ==
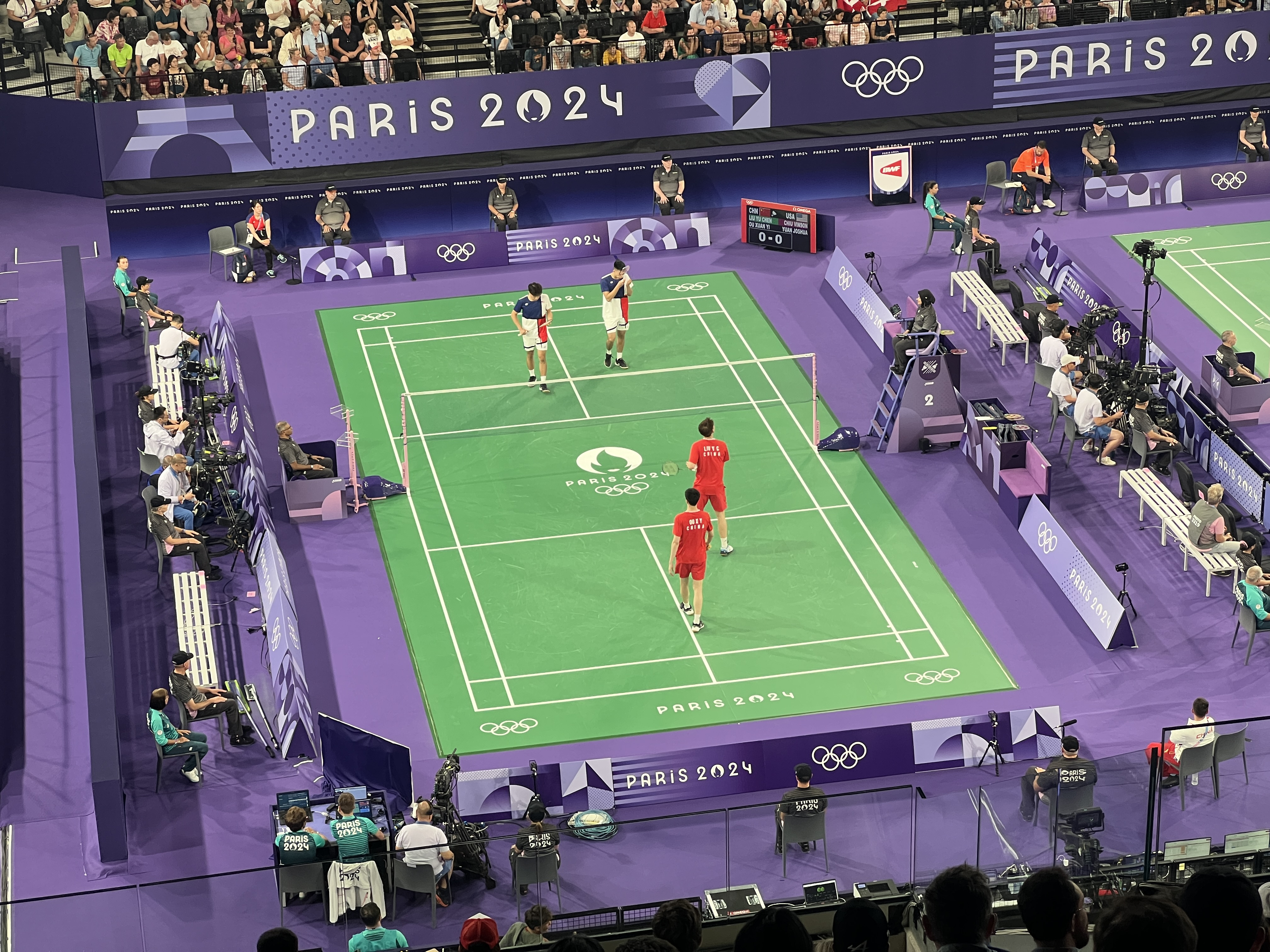
Yuan and Chiu during a match against Liu Yuchen and Ou Xuanyi at the 2024 Summer Olympics

Together with his partner Vinson Chiu, Yuan qualified for the men's doubles event at the 2024 Summer Olympics. The duo were placed in Group D but did not get past the group stages.

== Achievements ==
=== Pan Am Championships ===
Men's doubles
| Year | Venue | Partner | Opponent | Score | Result |
|---|---|---|---|---|---|
| 2022 | Palacio de los Deportes Carlos "El Famoso" Hernández; San Salvador, El Salvador | (United States) Vinson Chiu | (Mexico) Job Castillo (Mexico) Luis Montoya | 20–22, 8–11^{r} | Silver |
| 2023 | G.C. Foster College of Physical Education and Sport; Kingston, Jamaica | (United States) Vinson Chiu | (Canada) Kevin Lee (Canada) Ty Alexander Lindeman | 21–17, 23–21 | Bronze |
| 2024 | Teodoro Palacios Flores Gymnasium; Guatemala City, Guatemala | (United States) Vinson Chiu | (Canada) Adam Dong (Canada) Nyl Yakura | 15–21, 21–19, 17–21 | Bronze |

=== Pan Am Junior Championships ===
Men's doubles
| Year | Venue | Partner | Opponent | Score | Result |
|---|---|---|---|---|---|
| 2019 | CEPS Louis-J.-Robichaud; Moncton, Canada | (United States) William Hu | (Canada) Jonathan Chien (Canada) Brian Yang | 13–21, 12–21 | Bronze |

Mixed doubles
| Year | Venue | Partner | Opponent | Score | Result |
|---|---|---|---|---|---|
| 2021 | Hotel Mundo Imperial; Acapulco, Mexico | (United States) Allison Lee | (United States) Ryan Ma (United States) Chloe Ho | 21–14, 21–16 | Gold |

=== BWF International Challenge/Series (8 titles, 9 runners-up) ===
Men's doubles
| Year | Tournament | Partner | Opponent | Score | Result |
|---|---|---|---|---|---|
| 2022 | Mexican International | (United States) Vinson Chiu | (Czech Republic) Ondřej Král (Czech Republic) Adam Mendrek | 20–22, 19–21 | (silver) Runner-up |
| 2023 | El Salvador International | (United States) Vinson Chiu | (Canada) Kevin Lee (Canada) Ty Alexander Lindeman | 15–21, 18–21 | (silver) Runner-up |
| 2024 | Uganda International | (United States) Vinson Chiu | (India) Arjun M. R. (India) Dhruv Kapila | 14–21, 13–21 | (silver) Runner-up |

Mixed doubles
| Year | Tournament | Partner | Opponent | Score | Result |
|---|---|---|---|---|---|
| 2021 | Guatemala International | (United States) Allison Lee | (Canada) Ty Alexander Lindeman (Canada) Josephine Wu | 17–21, 8–21 | (silver) Runner-up |
| 2022 | Mexican International | (United States) Allison Lee | (United States) Vinson Chiu (United States) Jennie Gai | 14–21, 24–22, 21–23 | (silver) Runner-up |

BWF International Challenge tournament
BWF International Series tournament
BWF Future Series tournament
