= Catherine Choi =

Canadian badminton player

Catherine Choi 蔡卓如
Personal information
- Born: 1 May 2001 (age 25) Toronto, Ontario, Canada
- Height: 1.67 m (5 ft 6 in)
- Weight: 54.5 kg (120 lb)

Sport
- Country: Canada
- Sport: Badminton
- Handedness: Right
- Coached by: Efendi Wijaya

Women's doubles
- Highest ranking: 27 (with Josephine Wu, 31 October 2023)
- Current ranking: 48 (with Jacqueline Cheung, 15 April 2025)
- BWF profile
Medal record
Women's badminton
Representing Canada
Pan American Games
Gold medal – first place	2023 Santiago	Women's doubles
Pan Am Championships
Gold medal – first place	2023 Kingston	Women's doubles
Silver medal – second place	2019 Aguascalientes	Women's doubles
Silver medal – second place	2022 San Salvador	Women's doubles
Bronze medal – third place	2024 Guatemala City	Women's doubles
Pan Am Mixed Team Championships
Gold medal – first place	2019 Lima	Mixed team
Gold medal – first place	2025 Aguascalientes	Mixed team
Pan Am Female Cup
Gold medal – first place	2018 Tacarigua	Women's team
Gold medal – first place	2020 Salvador	Women's team
Gold medal – first place	2024 São Paulo	Women's team
Gold medal – first place	2026 Guatemala City	Women's team
Silver medal – second place	2022 Acapulco	Women's team
Pan Am Junior Championships
Silver medal – second place	2019 Moncton	Mixed doubles

Catherine Choi (born 1 May 2001) is a Canadian badminton player. She affiliates with E badminton club and represents Ontario in the national events. Choi was the women's doubles gold medalist at the 2023 Pan Am Championships and 2023 Pan American Games.

== Achievements ==
=== Pan American Games ===
Women's doubles
Year	Venue	Partner	Opponent	Score	Result
2023	Olympic Training Center, Santiago, Chile	(Canada) Josephine Wu	(United States) Annie Xu (United States) Kerry Xu	21–18, 10–21, 21–17	Gold

=== Pan Am Championships ===
Women's doubles
Year	Venue	Partner	Opponent	Score	Result
2019	Gimnasio Olímpico; Aguascalientes, Mexico	(Canada) Josephine Wu	(Canada) Rachel Honderich (Canada) Kristen Tsai	15–21, 25–27	Silver
2022	Palacio de los Deportes Carlos "El Famoso" Hernández; San Salvador, El Salvador	(Canada) Josephine Wu	(Canada) Rachel Honderich (Canada) Kristen Tsai	17–21, 18–21	Silver
2023	G.C. Foster College of Physical Education and Sport; Kingston, Jamaica	(Canada) Josephine Wu	(United States) Francesca Corbett (United States) Allison Lee	21–14, 21–18	Gold
2024	Teodoro Palacios Flores Gymnasium; Guatemala City, Guatemala	(Canada) Josephine Wu	(United States) Francesca Corbett (United States) Allison Lee	18–21, 15–21	Bronze

=== Pan Am Junior Championships ===
Mixed doubles
Year	Venue	Partner	Opponent	Score	Result
2019	CEPS Louis-J.-Robichaud; Moncton, Canada	(Canada) Brian Yang	(Canada) Jonathan Chien (Canada) Crystal Lai	21–18, 19–21, 18–21	Silver

=== BWF International Challenge/Series (3 titles, 4 runners-up) ===
Women's doubles
Year	Venue	Partner	Opponent	Score	Result
2019	Bulgarian Open	(Canada) Josephine Wu	(Turkey) Bengisu Erçetin (Turkey) Nazlıcan İnci	8–21, 8–21	(silver) Runner-up
2022	Mexican International	(Canada) Josephine Wu	(United States) Paula Lynn Cao Hok (United States) Lauren Lam	21–19, 21–10	(gold) Winner
2023	Polish Open	(Canada) Josephine Wu	(Singapore) Jin Yujia (Singapore) Crystal Wong	17–21, 21–17, 15–21	(silver) Runner-up
2023	Guatemala International	(Canada) Josephine Wu	(United States) Annie Xu (United States) Kerry Xu	21–18, 21–18	(gold) Winner
2024	Azerbaijan International	(Canada) Josephine Wu	(Bulgaria) Gabriela Stoeva (Bulgaria) Stefani Stoeva	14–21, 7–21	(silver) Runner-up
2024	Canadian International	(Canada) Jacqueline Cheung	(Chinese Taipei) Lin Wan-ching (Chinese Taipei) Liu Chiao-yun	18–21, 8–21	(silver) Runner-up

Mixed doubles
Year	Tournament	Partner	Opponent	Score	Result
2018	El Salvador International	(Canada) Brian Yang	(Guatemala) Aníbal Marroquín (Peru) Dánica Nishimura	21–6, 21–7	(gold) Winner

BWF International Challenge tournament
BWF International Series tournament
BWF Future Series tournament

=== BWF Junior International (2 titles) ===
Girls' doubles
Year	Tournament	Partner	Opponent	Score	Result
2019	Canadian Junior International	(Canada) Talia Ng	(Canada) Crystal Lai (Canada) Wendy Zhang	21–19, 21–16	(gold) Winner

Mixed doubles
Year	Tournament	Partner	Opponent	Score	Result
2019	Canadian Junior International	(Canada) Brian Yang	(Canada) Jonathan Chien (Canada) Talia Ng	21–12, 15–21, 21–10	(gold) Winner

BWF Junior International Grand Prix tournament
BWF Junior International Challenge tournament
BWF Junior International Series tournament
BWF Junior Future Series tournament
