= Ondřej Král =

Czech badminton player (born 1999)

Personal information
- Born: 15 April 1999 (age 27) Most, Czech Republic
- Height: 1.82 m (6 ft 0 in)
- Weight: 82 kg (181 lb)

Sport
- Country: Czech Republic
- Sport: Badminton
- Handedness: Right

Men's & mixed doubles
- Highest ranking: 41 (MD with Jiří Král, 29 September 2026); 43 (MD with Adam Mendrek, 6 August 2024); 52 (XD with Tereza Švábíková, 14 April 2026)
- Current ranking: 45 (MD with Jiří Král); 103 (XD with Tereza Švábíková) (27 October 2026)
- BWF profile

Ondřej Král (born 15 April 1999) is a Czech badminton player. He represented the Czech Republic in men's doubles at the 2024 Summer Olympics. Král was also selected to represent the Czech Republic in the 2024 Thomas Cup.

== Career ==
In 2018, Král reached the final of the Hellas International but lost to Toma Junior Popov of France. In 2021, he formed a partnership in men's doubles with Adam Mendrek and together they went on to reach the final of the Hellas International. The duo lost to Junaidi Arif and Muhammad Haikal of Malaysia in the final. In 2022, Král and Mendrek won their first international title as a pair, beating Vinson Chiu and Joshua Yuan of the United States in the final. The pair won their second title at the Azerbaijan International in 2024, beating P. S. Ravikrishna and Sankar Prasad Udayakumar in the final.

In May 2024, Král and Mendrek officially qualified for the 2024 Summer Olympics men's doubles event. In Group B, they lost their first match to 2023 world champions Kang Min-hyuk and Seo Seung-jae. In their second match, they lost to Supak Jomkoh and Kittinupong Kedren of Thailand. The duo lost their chances of qualifying for the knockout stages after losing their final match to Christo Popov and Toma Junior Popov.

== Achievements ==
=== BWF International Challenge/Series (3 titles, 4 runners-up) ===
Men's singles
Year	Tournament	Opponent	Score	Result
2018	Hellas International	(France) Toma Junior Popov	7–21, 13–21	(silver) Runner-up

Men's doubles
Year	Tournament	Partner	Opponent	Score	Result
2021	Hellas International	(Czech Republic) Adam Mendrek	(Malaysia) Junaidi Arif (Malaysia) Muhammad Haikal	16–21, 15–21	(silver) Runner-up
2022	Mexican International	(Czech Republic) Adam Mendrek	(United States) Vinson Chiu (United States) Joshua Yuan	22–20, 21–19	(gold) Winner
2022	El Salvador International	(Czech Republic) Adam Mendrek	(Canada) Kevin Lee (Canada) Ty Alexander Lindeman	19–21, 21–17, 18–21	(silver) Runner-up
2023	Czech Open	(Czech Republic) Adam Mendrek	(United States) Chen Zhi-yi (United States) Presley Smith	15–21, 11–21	(silver) Runner-up
2024	Azerbaijan International	(Czech Republic) Adam Mendrek	(India) P. S. Ravikrishna (India) Sankar Prasad Udayakumar	21–14, 21–19	(gold) Winner
2024	Czech Open	(Czech Republic) Jiří Král	(Germany) Jonathan Dresp (Germany) Aaron Sonnenschein	21–18, 21–19	(gold) Winner

BWF International Challenge tournament
BWF International Series tournament
BWF Future Series tournament
