= 2021 Pan Am Badminton Championships =

Tournament details
- Dates: 28 April 2021 – 2 May 2021
- Competitors: 121 from 16 nations
- Venue: Sagrado Corazon de Jesus
- Location: Guatemala City, Guatemala

Champions
- Men's singles: (Canada) Brian Yang
- Women's singles: (United States) Beiwen Zhang
- Men's doubles: (United States) Phillip Chew (United States) Ryan Chew
- Women's doubles: (Canada) Rachel Honderich (Canada) Kristen Tsai
- Mixed doubles: (Canada) Joshua Hurlburt-Yu (Canada) Josephine Wu

The 2021 Pan Am Badminton Championships are the 24th tournament of the Pan American Badminton Championships held in Guatemala City, Guatemala, from April 28 to May 2, 2021.

== Tournament ==
The 2021 Pan Am Badminton Championships is the 24th edition of the championships. This tournament is organized by the Badminton Federation of Guatemala and sanctioned by the BWF. The tournament consist of men's (singles and doubles), women's (singles and doubles), and also mixed doubles.

=== Point distribution ===
Below is the tables with the point distribution for each phase of the tournament based on the BWF points system for the Pan American Badminton Championships, which is equivalent to a Super 300 event.

Winner	Runner-up	3/4	5/8	9/16	17/32	33/64
7,000	5,950	4,900	3,850	2,750	1,670	660

== Medal summary ==
=== Medalists ===
Event	Gold	Silver	Bronze
Men's singles	(Canada) Brian Yang	(Canada) Jason Ho-Shue	(Guatemala) Kevin Cordón
Men's singles	(Canada) Brian Yang	(Canada) Jason Ho-Shue	(Canada) B. R. Sankeerth
Women's singles	(United States) Beiwen Zhang	(Canada) Rachel Chan	(Canada) Talia Ng
Women's singles	(United States) Beiwen Zhang	(Canada) Rachel Chan	(United States) Iris Wang
Men's doubles	(United States) Phillip Chew (United States) Ryan Chew	(Canada) Jason Ho-Shue (Canada) Nyl Yakura	(Guatemala) Rubén Castellanos (Guatemala) Christopher Martínez
Men's doubles	(United States) Phillip Chew (United States) Ryan Chew	(Canada) Jason Ho-Shue (Canada) Nyl Yakura	(Mexico) Job Castillo (Mexico) Luis Montoya
Women's doubles	(Canada) Rachel Honderich (Canada) Kristen Tsai	(United States) Francesca Corbett (United States) Allison Lee	(Guatemala) Diana Corleto (Guatemala) Nikté Sotomayor
Women's doubles	(Canada) Rachel Honderich (Canada) Kristen Tsai	(United States) Francesca Corbett (United States) Allison Lee	(Guatemala) Alejandra Paiz (Guatemala) Mariana Paiz
Mixed doubles	(Canada) Joshua Hurlburt-Yu (Canada) Josephine Wu	(Guatemala) Christopher Martínez (Guatemala) Mariana Paiz	(Guatemala) Jonathan Solís (Guatemala) Diana Corleto
Mixed doubles	(Canada) Joshua Hurlburt-Yu (Canada) Josephine Wu	(Guatemala) Christopher Martínez (Guatemala) Mariana Paiz	(Mexico) Andrés López (Mexico) Sabrina Solis

=== Medal table ===
* Host nation (Guatemala)

Rank	Nation	Gold	Silver	Bronze	Total
1	Canada (CAN)	3	3	2	8
2	United States (USA)	2	1	1	4
3	Guatemala (GUA)*	0	1	5	6
4	Mexico (MEX)	0	0	2	2
Totals (4 entries)		5	5	10	20

== Men's singles ==
=== Seeds ===
1. (Canada) Jason Ho-Shue (final)
2. (Canada) Brian Yang (champions)
3. (Brazil) Ygor Coelho (quarter-finals)
4. (Guatemala) Kevin Cordón (semi-finals)
5. (Mexico) Lino Muñoz (quarter-finals)
6. (Canada) B. R. Sankeerth (semi-finals)
7. (United States) Timothy Lam (quarter-finals)
8. (Cuba) Osleni Guerrero (withdrew)

=== Finals ===
Semi-finals
1	(Canada) Jason Ho-Shue	21	21
4	(Guatemala) Kevin Cordón	17	18
6	(Canada) B. R. Sankeerth	21	9	9
2	(Canada) Brian Yang	19	21	21

Final
1	(Canada) Jason Ho-Shue	13	10^{r}
2	(Canada) Brian Yang	21	18

=== Top half ===
==== Section 1 ====
First Round

Second Round
1	(Canada) J Ho-Shue	18	21	21
(El Salvador) U Artiga	21	12	15
(Ecuador) A Baque	14	11
(Guatemala) Y Alvarez	21	21
5	(Mexico) L Muñoz	23	13	21
(Mexico) L Montoya	21	21	14
(Guyana) N Ramdhani	21	21
(Barbados) S Martin	18	12

Third Round
1	(Canada) J Ho-Shue	21	21
(Guatemala) Y Alvarez	8	14
5	(Mexico) L Muñoz	21	21
(Guyana) N Ramdhani	16	15

Quarter-finals
1	(Canada) J Ho-Shue	1
5	(Mexico) L Muñoz	0^{r}

==== Section 2 ====
First Round
(Guatemala) A Ortíz	w	/	o
(Brazil) A Pomoceno

Second Round
4	(Guatemala) K Cordón	21	21
(Peru) J Guevara	17	17
(El Salvador) D Monge	w	/	o
(Cuba) L Martínez
7	(United States) T Lam	w	/	o
(Brazil) J Matias
(Brazil) V Santos
(Guatemala) A Ortíz	w	/	o

Third Round
4	(Guatemala) K Cordón	21	21
(El Salvador) D Monge	13	5
7	(United States) T Lam	21	21
(Guatemala) A Ortíz	8	6

Quarter-finals
4	(Guatemala) K Cordón	21	21
7	(United States) T Lam	15	8

=== Bottom half ===
==== Section 3 ====
First Round
(Dominican Republic) C Brito
(Mexico) A Gaitan	w	/	o

Second Round
(Mexico) A Gaitan	21	21
(El Salvador) J Alas	10	13
(United States) H Shu	16	21	19
6	(Canada) B. R. Sankeerth	21	16	21
(Mexico) J Castillo	21	21
(Guatemala) J Ochoa	7	6
(United States) E Sarmiento	7	9
3	(Brazil) Y Coelho	21	21

Third Round
(Mexico) A Gaitan	20	12
6	(Canada) B. R. Sankeerth	22	21
(Mexico) J Castillo	22	21	18
3	(Brazil) Y Coelho	24	19	21

Quarter-finals
6	(Canada) B. R. Sankeerth	21	21
3	(Brazil) Y Coelho	12	12

==== Section 4 ====
First Round

Second Round
(Barbados) G Robinson	19	20
(Ecuador) J Rodriguez	21	22
(El Salvador) M Mejia	w	/	o
8	(Cuba) O Guerrero
(Guatemala) C Martínez	21	21
(United States) M Fogarty	7	9
(Guatemala) R Castellanos	13	10
2	(Canada) B Yang	21	21

Third Round
(Ecuador) J Rodriguez	12	17
(El Salvador) M Mejia	21	21
(Guatemala) C Martínez	10	6
2	(Canada) B Yang	21	21

Quarter-finals
(El Salvador) M Mejia	5	6
2	(Canada) B Yang	21	21

== Women's singles ==
=== Seeds ===
1. (United States) Beiwen Zhang (champions)
2. (United States) Iris Wang (semi-finals)
3. (Brazil) Fabiana Silva (withdrew)
4. (Peru) Daniela Macías (second round)

=== Finals ===
Semi-finals
1	(United States) Beiwen Zhang	21	21
(Canada) Talia Ng	16	8
(Canada) Rachel Chan	19	21	21
2	(United States) Iris Wang	21	14	9

Final
1	(United States) Beiwen Zhang	21	21
(Canada) Rachel Chan	14	18

=== Top half ===
==== Section 1 ====
First round
(Mexico) V Garcia	w	/	o
(Cuba) M Ortiz
(Guatemala) A Paiz	23	15
(Ecuador) M Zambrano	25	21
(Mexico) V Villalobos	22	21
(Colombia) M Pérez	20	15

Second round
1	(United States) BW Zhang	21	21
(Mexico) V Garcia	8	12
(Ecuador) M Zambrano	19	16
(Mexico) V Villalobos	21	21

Quarter-finals
1	(United States) BW Zhang	21	21
(Mexico) V Villalobos	8	10

==== Section 2 ====
First round
3	(Brazil) F Silva
(El Salvador) F Centeno	w	/	o
(Peru) F Saponara	21	21
(United States) I Zhong	15	16
(Canada) T Ng	18	21	21
(Mexico) H Gaitan	21	11	17
(Peru) I Castillo	21	21
(Guatemala) M Palacios	6	3

Second round
(El Salvador) F Centeno	16	13
(Peru) F Saponara	21	21
(Canada) T Ng	21	14	21
(Peru) I Castillo	10	21	9

Quarter-finals
(Peru) F Saponara	13	13
(Canada) T Ng	21	21

=== Bottom half ===
==== Section 3 ====
First round
(El Salvador) K Lara	13	6
(Mexico) S Solis	21	21
(Brazil) J Vieira	w	/	o
(Cuba) Y Ortiz	w	/	o
(Canada) R Chan	21	21
(Guatemala) A Gonzalez	13	8
(Guatemala) K Ardon	13	7
4	(Peru) D Macías	21	21

Second round
(Mexico) S Solis	w	/	o
(Canada) R Chan	21	21
4	(Peru) D Macías	11	15

Quarter-finals
(Mexico) S Solis	13	19
(Canada) R Chan	21	21

==== Section 4 ====
First Round
(Guyana) P Ramdhani	8	12
(Dominican Republic) N Jiménez	21	21
(El Salvador) D Hernández	14	21	21
(Guatemala) L Santizo	21	18	13
(Brazil) J Alves
(Colombia) J Giraldo	w	/	o
(Guatemala) N Sotomayor	9	6
2	(United States) I Wang	21	21

Second Round
(Dominican Republic) N Jiménez	21	21
(El Salvador) D Hernández	6	9
(Colombia) J Giraldo	9	9
2	(United States) I Wang	21	21

Quarter-finals
(Dominican Republic) N Jiménez	10	12
2	(United States) I Wang	21	21

== Men's doubles ==
=== Seeds ===
1. (Canada) Jason Ho-Shue / Nyl Yakura (final)
2. (United States) Phillip Chew / Ryan Chew (champions)

=== Finals ===
Final
1	(Canada) Jason Ho-Shue (Canada) Nyl Yakura
2	(United States) Phillip Chew (United States) Ryan Chew	w	/	o

=== Top half ===
First Round
(Brazil) F Farias (Brazil) F Farias
(Peru) J Guevara (Peru) D Mini	w	/	o
(Guatemala) R Castellanos (Guatemala) C Martínez	21	21
(El Salvador) J Alas (El Salvador) M Mejia	9	9
(United States) S Kolla (United States) P Smith	21	21
(Barbados) S Martin (Barbados) G Robinson	10	9

Quarter-finals
1	(Canada) J Ho-Shue (Canada) N Yakura	21	21
(Peru) J Guevara (Peru) D Mini	13	15
(Guatemala) R Castellanos (Guatemala) C Martínez	21	23
(United States) S Kolla (United States) P Smith	16	21

Semi-finals
1	(Canada) J Ho-Shue (Canada) N Yakura	21	21
(Guatemala) R Castellanos (Guatemala) C Martínez	15	7

=== Bottom half ===
First Round
(Ecuador) A Baque (Ecuador) E Zambrano	11	16
(Peru) D la Torre (Peru) D Subauste	21	21
(Mexico) J Castillo (Mexico) L Montoya	21	21
(Guatemala) J Granados (Guatemala) A Ortíz	16	13
(Cuba) O Guerrero (Cuba) L Martínez
(Guatemala) A Marroquín (Guatemala) J Solís	w	/	o
(Brazil) A Pomoceno (Brazil) M Vogt
2	(United States) P Chew (United States) R Chew	w	/	o

Quarter-finals
(Peru) D la Torre (Peru) D Subauste	13	12
(Mexico) J Castillo (Mexico) L Montoya	21	21
(Guatemala) A Marroquín (Guatemala) J Solís	17	9
2	(United States) P Chew (United States) R Chew	21	21

Semi-finals
(Mexico) J Castillo (Mexico) L Montoya	17	21	23
2	(United States) P Chew (United States) R Chew	21	14	25

== Women's doubles ==
=== Seeds ===
1. (Canada) Rachel Honderich / Kristen Tsai (champions)
2. (Peru) Daniela Macías / Dánica Nishimura (withdrew)

=== Finals ===
Final
1	(Canada) Rachel Honderich (Canada) Kristen Tsai	21	21
	(United States) Francesca Corbett (United States) Alison Lee	12	7

=== Top half ===
First Round
(Brazil) S Lima (Brazil) T Santos
(Guatemala) A Gonzalez (Guatemala) K Ardon	w	/	o
(United States) K Ngo (United States) E Shi	21	19	21
(Guatemala) D Corleto (Guatemala) N Sotomayor	15	21	23

Quarter-finals
1	(Canada) R Honderich (Canada) K Tsai	21	21
(Guatemala) A Gonzalez (Guatemala) K Ardon	9	1
(Peru) I Castillo (Peru) P la Torre	4	21	15
(Guatemala) D Corleto (Guatemala) N Sotomayor	21	18	21

Semi-finals
1	(Canada) R Honderich (Canada) K Tsai	21	21
(Guatemala) D Corleto (Guatemala) N Sotomayor	11	14

=== Bottom half ===
First Round
(Cuba) M Ortiz (Cuba) Y Ortiz
(Colombia) J Giraldo (Colombia) M Pérez	w	/	o
(United States) F Corbett (United States) A Lee	21	21
(Mexico) S Solís (Mexico) V Villalobos	16	16
(El Salvador) F Centeno (El Salvador) K Lara	11	19
(Guatemala) A Paiz (Guatemala) M Paiz	21	21

Quarter-finals
(Colombia) J Giraldo (Colombia) M Pérez	9	6
(United States) F Corbett (United States) A Lee	21	21
(Guatemala) A Paiz (Guatemala) M Paiz	w	/	o
2	(Peru) D Macías (Peru) D Nishimura

Semi-finals
(United States) F Corbett (United States) A Lee	21	21
(Guatemala) A Paiz (Guatemala) M Paiz	5	13

== Mixed doubles ==
=== Seeds ===
1. (Canada) Joshua Hurlburt-Yu / Josephine Wu (champions)
2. (United States) Mathew Fogarty / Isabel Zhong (second round)
3. (Guatemala) Jonathan Solís / Diana Corleto (semi-finals)
4. (Peru) Diego Mini / Dánica Nishimura (withdrew)

=== Finals ===
Semi-finals
1	(Canada) Joshua Hurlburt-Yu (Canada) Josephine Wu	21	21
3	(Guatemala) Jonathan Solís (Guatemala) Diana Corleto	12	17
(Mexico) Andrés López (Mexico) Sabrina Solis	20	19
(Guatemala) Christopher Martínez (Guatemala) Mariana Paiz	22	21

Final
1	(Canada) Joshua Hurlburt-Yu (Canada) Josephine Wu	21	21
(Guatemala) Christopher Martínez (Guatemala) Mariana Paiz	18	18

=== Top half ===
==== Section 1 ====
First Round
(Mexico) L Montoya (Mexico) V Villalobos	21	21
(El Salvador) D Monge (El Salvador) D Hernández	11	9
(Guatemala) D Trujillo (Guatemala) M Palacios	w	/	o
(Brazil) F Farias (Brazil) S Lima

Second Round
1	(Canada) J Hurlburt-Yu (Canada) J Wu	19	21	21
(Mexico) L Montoya (Mexico) V Villalobos	21	9	18
(Cuba) L Martínez (Cuba) Y Ortiz
(Guatemala) D Trujillo (Guatemala) M Palacios	w	/	o

Quarter-finals
1	(Canada) J Hurlburt-Yu (Canada) J Wu	21	21
(Guatemala) D Trujillo (Guatemala) M Palacios	4	10

==== Section 2 ====
First Round
(Guyana) N Ramdhani (Guyana) P Ramdhani	13	13
(Guatemala) A Ortíz (Guatemala) A Paiz	21	21
(Guatemala) J Granados (Guatemala) A Gonzalez	8	4
(Peru) D la Torre (Peru) P la Torre	21	21
(United States) S Kolla (United States) B Manikonda	21	21
(Mexico) A Gaitan (Mexico) V Garcia	14	16

Second Round
3	(Guatemala) J Solís (Guatemala) D Corleto	21	21
(Guatemala) A Ortíz (Guatemala) A Paiz	13	12
(Peru) D la Torre (Peru) P la Torre	21	19	16
(United States) S Kolla (United States) B Manikonda	9	21	21

Quarter-finals
3	(Guatemala) J Solís (Guatemala) D Corleto	21	25
(United States) S Kolla (United States) B Manikonda	10	23

=== Bottom half ===
==== Section 3 ====
First Round
(Peru) D Subauste (Peru) F Saponara	13	13
(Mexico) A López (Mexico) S Solis	21	21
(Guatemala) Y Alvarez (Guatemala) K Ardon	w	/	o
(Brazil) M Voigt (Brazil) B Lima
(Ecuador) A Baque (Ecuador) M Zambrano	21	18	19
(El Salvador) J Alas (El Salvador) F Centeno	15	21	21

Second Round
(Mexico) A López (Mexico) S Solis	21	21
(Guatemala) Y Alvarez (Guatemala) K Ardon	18	12
(El Salvador) J Alas (El Salvador) F Centeno	w	/	o
4	(Peru) D Mini (Peru) D Nishimura

Quarter-finals
(Mexico) A López (Mexico) S Solis	21	21
(El Salvador) J Alas (El Salvador) F Centeno	17	10

==== Section 4 ====
First Round
(Brazil) F Farias (Brazil) J Alves
(Guatemala) C Martínez (Guatemala) M Paiz	w	/	o
(Dominican Republic) C Brito (Dominican Republic) N Jiménez
(El Salvador) M Mejia (El Salvador) K Lara	w	/	o

Second Round
(Guatemala) C Martínez (Guatemala) M Paiz	w	/	o
(Brazil) A Pomoceno (Brazil) T Santos
(El Salvador) M Mejia (El Salvador) K Lara	21	15	21
2	(United States) M Fogarty (United States) I Zhong	19	21	19

Quarter-finals
(Guatemala) C Martínez (Guatemala) M Paiz	21	21
(El Salvador) M Mejia (El Salvador) K Lara	10	9
