= Ishika Jaiswal =

American badminton player (born 2003)

Personal information
- Born: 28 July 2003 (age 23)
- Height: 1.62 m (5 ft 4 in)

Sport
- Country: United States
- Sport: Badminton
- Handedness: Right

Women's singles & doubles
- Highest ranking: 51 (WS, 6 October 2026); 34 (WD with Srivedya Gurazada, 17 January 2023)
- Current ranking: 53 (WS, 3 November 2026)
- BWF profile

Ishika Jaiswal (born 28 July 2003) is an American badminton player. She grew up in Fremont, California. She has earned several BWF international titles.

== Achievements ==
=== BWF International Challenge/Series (7 titles, 7 runners-up) ===
Women's singles
Year	Tournament	Opponent	Score	Result	Ref.
2021	Guatemala International	(United States) Lauren Lam	11–21, 10–21	(silver) Runner-up	
2021	El Salvador International	(Brazil) Juliana Viana Vieira	21–19, 21–17	(gold) Winner	
2023	Guatemala International	(India) Samiya Farooqui	15–21, 15–21	(silver) Runner-up	
2023	Guatemala International	(Canada) Nong Sophia	21–19, 21–9	(gold) Winner	
2023	Mexican International	(Canada) Talia Ng	15–21, 21–14, 19–21	(silver) Runner-up	
2024	Mexican International	(Spain) Clara Azurmendi	14–21, 21–19, 21–19	(gold) Winner	
2025	Uganda International	(Turkey) Neslihan Arın	21–15, 19–21, 22–20	(gold) Winner	
2025	Bangladesh International	(India) Tanvi Reddy Andluri	22–20, 21–23, 21–17	(gold) Winner	
2026	Cuba International	(Peru) Inés Castillo	21–10, 21–6	(gold) Winner	
2026	Arise International	(Chinese Taipei) Huang Ching-ping	15–21, 21–14, 21–23	(silver) Runner-up	
2026	Peru International	(United States) Ella Lin	21–19, 16–21, 9–21	(silver) Runner-up	

Women's doubles
Year	Tournament	Partner	Opponent	Score	Result	Ref.
2021	Mexican Open	(India) Srivedya Gurazada	(Canada) Crystal Lai (Canada) Alexandra Mocanu	20–22, 21–17 21–16	(gold) Winner	
2023	Mauritius International	(United States) Srivedya Gurazada	(Japan) Natsumi Takasaki (Japan) Mai Tanabe	4–21, 14–21	(silver) Runner-up	

Mixed doubles
Year	Tournament	Partner	Opponent	Score	Result
2021	El Salvador International	(United States) Kevin Shi	(Guatemala) Christopher Martínez (Guatemala) Mariana Paiz	14–21, 18–21	(silver) Runner-up

BWF International Challenge tournament
BWF International Series tournament
BWF Future Series tournament
