= Talia Ng =

Canadian badminton player

Talia Ng 吳熙兒
Personal information
- Born: 6 November 2001 (age 25) Markham, Ontario, Canada
- Height: 1.74 m (5 ft 9 in)
- Weight: 59 kg (130 lb)

Sport
- Country: Canada
- Sport: Badminton
- Handedness: Right

Women's singles & doubles
- Highest ranking: 53 (WS, 7 February 2023); 81 (WD with Wenyu Zhang, 27 February 2024)
- BWF profile
Medal record
Women's badminton
Representing Canada
Pan Am Championships
Bronze medal – third place	2021 Guatemala City	Women's singles
Pan Am Mixed Team Championships
Gold medal – first place	2019 Lima	Mixed team
Gold medal – first place	2023 Guadalajara	Mixed team
Pan Am Female Cup
Gold medal – first place	2018 Tacarigua	Women's team
Gold medal – first place	2024 São Paulo	Women's team
Silver medal – second place	2022 Acapulco	Women's team
Pan Am Junior Championships
Silver medal – second place	2018 Salvador	Girls' singles
Silver medal – second place	2018 Salvador	Mixed doubles

Talia Ng
- Traditional Chinese: 吳熙兒
- Simplified Chinese: 吴熙儿
Transcriptions
Standard Mandarin
- Hanyu Pinyin: Wú Xī'ér
Yue: Cantonese
- Jyutping: Ng4 Hei1 Ji4

Talia Ng (born 6 November 2001) is a Canadian badminton player. She is affiliated with Ontario Badminton Club. She won a bronze medal in the women's singles event at the 2021 Pan Am Badminton Championships.

== Background ==
Ng began playing badminton at the age of nine after her father introduced her to the sport. She started as a recreational player and joined her first U10 event at the Granite Club. After finishing second in her debut competition, she grew to enjoy the sport.

== Achievements ==
=== Pan American Championships ===
Women's singles
Year	Venue	Opponent	Score	Result
2021	Sagrado Corazon de Jesus; Guatemala City, Guatemala	(United States) Beiwen Zhang	16–21, 8–21	Bronze

=== Pan Am Junior Championships ===
Girls' singles
Year	Venue	Opponent	Score	Result
2018	Centro Panamericano de Judo; Salvador, Brazil	(Canada) Wendy Zhang	22–20, 21–15	Gold

Mixed doubles
Year	Venue	Partner	Opponent	Score	Result
2018	Centro Panamericano de Judo; Salvador, Brazil	(Canada) Stanley Feng	(Canada) Kevin Wang (Canada) Wendy Zhang	18–21, 21–11, 19–21	Silver

=== BWF International Challenge/Series (5 titles, 1 runner-up) ===
Women's singles
Year	Tournament	Opponent	Score	Result
2018	Guatemala International	(Canada) Katie Ho-Shue	21–14, 21–16	(gold) Winner
2018	Yonex / K&D Graphics International	(Japan) Aya Ohori	6–21, 7–21	(silver) Runner-up
2022	Uganda International	(India) Mansi Singh	21–10, 21–12	(gold) Winner
2023	Norwegian International	(Denmark) Irina Amalie Andersen	21–10, 12–21, 21–17	(gold) Winner
2023	Mexican International	(United States) Ishika Jaiswal	21–15, 14–21, 21–19	(gold) Winner

Women's doubles
Year	Tournament	Partner	Opponent	Score	Result
2018	Guatemala International	(Canada) Josephine Wu	(Canada) Eliana Zhang (Canada) Wendy Zhang	14–21, 21–17, 21–10	(gold) Winner

BWF International Challenge tournament
BWF International Series tournament
BWF Future Series tournament

=== BWF Junior International (3 titles, 1 runner-up) ===
Girls' singles
Year	Tournament	Opponent	Score	Result
2019	Canadian Junior International	(Canada) Wendy Zhang	21–16, 21–15	(gold) Winner
2019	Lithuanian Junior	(Belgium) Clara Lassaux	21–14, 21–6	(gold) Winner

Girls' doubles
Year	Tournament	Partner	Opponent	Score	Result
2019	Canadian Junior International	(Canada) Catherine Choi	(Canada) Crystal Lai (Canada) Wendy Zhang	21–19, 21–16	(gold) Winner

Mixed doubles
Year	Tournament	Partner	Opponent	Score	Result
2019	Canadian Junior International	(Canada) Jonathan Chien	(Canada) Brian Yang (Canada) Catherine Choi	12–21, 21–15, 10–21	(silver) Runner-up

BWF Junior International Grand Prix tournament
BWF Junior International Challenge tournament
BWF Junior International Series tournament
BWF Junior Future Series tournament
