= Kevin Lee (badminton) =

Canadian badminton player (born 1998)

Personal information
- Born: 10 November 1998 (age 28) Winnipeg, Manitoba, Canada

Sport
- Country: Canada
- Sport: Badminton

Men's doubles
- Highest ranking: 36 (with Ty Alexander Lindeman, 13 October 2025)
- Current ranking: 39 (with Ty Alexander Lindeman, 10 November 2026)
- BWF profile
Medal record
Men's badminton
Representing Canada
Pan Am Championships
Silver medal – second place	2023 Kingston	Men's doubles
Silver medal – second place	2026 Lima	Men's doubles
Bronze medal – third place	2022 San Salvador	Men's doubles
Bronze medal – third place	2025 Lima	Men's doubles
Pan Am Male Cup
Gold medal – first place	2022 Acapulco	Men's team
Gold medal – first place	2024 São Paulo	Men's team
Gold medal – first place	2026 Guatemala City	Men's team
Pan Am Mixed Team Championships
Gold medal – first place	2023 Guadalajara	Mixed team
Gold medal – first place	2025 Aguascalientes	Mixed team

Kevin Lee (born 10 November 1998) is a Canadian badminton player. Playing doubles with Ty Alexander Lindeman, he reached a top ranking of 40 and represented Canada at the 2023 Pan American Games, where the team reached the quarter-finals, and at the 2023 Pan Am Badminton Championships, where they reached the final.

== Achievements ==
=== Pan Am Championships ===
Men's doubles
Year	Venue	Partner	Opponent	Score	Result
2022	Palacio de los Deportes Carlos "El Famoso" Hernández; San Salvador, El Salvador	(Canada) Ty Alexander Lindeman	(United States) Vinson Chiu (United States) Joshua Yuan	14–21, 16–21	Bronze
2023	G.C. Foster College of Physical Education and Sport; Kingston, Jamaica	(Canada) Ty Alexander Lindeman	(Canada) Adam Dong (Canada) Nyl Yakura	10–21, 21–16, 20–22	Silver
2025	Videna Poli 2 Lima, Peru	(Canada) Ty Alexander Lindeman	(Brazil) Fabrício Farias (Brazil) Davi Silva	21–19, 17–21, 11–21	Bronze
2026	High Performance Center VIDENA, Lima, Peru	(Canada) Ty Alexander Lindeman	(United States) Chen Zhi-yi (United States) Presley Smith	21–13, 21–8	Silver

=== BWF International Challenge/Series (7 titles, 6 runners-up) ===
Men's doubles
Year	Tournament	Partner	Opponent	Score	Result
2021	Guatemala International	(Canada) Ty Alexander Lindeman	(Guatemala) Jonathan Solís (Guatemala) Aníbal Marroquín	19–21, 21–17, 21–10	(gold) Winner
2022	El Salvador International	(Canada) Ty Alexander Lindeman	(Czech Republic) Ondřej Král (Czech Republic) Adam Mendrek	21–19, 17–21, 21–18	(gold) Winner
2023	Guatemala International	(Canada) Ty Alexander Lindeman	(Brazil) Fabrício Farias (Brazil) Davi Silva	21–18, 21–14	(gold) Winner
2023	Peru Challenge	(Canada) Ty Alexander Lindeman	(Canada) Adam Dong (Canada) Nyl Yakura	21–16, 21–18	(gold) Winner
2023	El Salvador International	(Canada) Ty Alexander Lindeman	(United States) Vinson Chiu (United States) Joshua Yuan	21–15, 21–18	(gold) Winner
2024	Canadian International	(Canada) Ty Alexander Lindeman	(United States) Chen Zhi-yi (United States) Presley Smith	11–21, 9–21	(silver) Runner-up
2025	Guatemala International	(Canada) Ty Alexander Lindeman	(Brazil) Fabrício Farias (Brazil) Davi Silva	21–11, 20–22, 17–21	(silver) Runner-up
2025	Canadian International	(Canada) Ty Alexander Lindeman	(United States) Chen Zhi-yi (United States) Presley Smith	21–17, 15–21, 13–21	(silver) Runner-up
2026	Brazil International	(Canada) Ty Alexander Lindeman	(Japan) Takuto Goto (Japan) Yuta Oku	17–21, 17–21	(silver) Runner-up
2026	Guatemala International	(Canada) Ty Alexander Lindeman	(Brazil) Fabrício Farias (Brazil) Davi Silva	21–12, 21–17	(gold) Winner
2026	Arise International	(Canada) Ty Alexander Lindeman	(Brazil) Fabrício Farias (Brazil) Davi Silva	15–21, 21–11, 22–20	(gold) Winner
2026	Peru International	(Canada) Ty Alexander Lindeman	(Brazil) Fabrício Farias (Brazil) Davi Silva	18–21, 21–18, 15–21	(silver) Runner-up

Mixed doubles
Year	Tournament	Partner	Opponent	Score	Result
2023	Guatemala International	(Canada) Eliana Zhang	(Canada) Ty Alexander Lindeman (Canada) Josephine Wu	9–21, 11–21	(silver) Runner-up

BWF International Challenge tournament
BWF International Series tournament
BWF Future Series tournament
