= Rachel Chan (badminton) =

Canadian badminton player

Personal information
- Born: 15 November 2003 (age 22) Toronto, Ontario, Canada
- Height: 1.66 m (5 ft 5 in)
- Weight: 57 kg (126 lb)

Sport
- Country: Canada
- Sport: Badminton
- Handedness: Right

Women's singles
- Highest ranking: 45 (29 September 2026)
- Current ranking: 51 (3 November 2026)
- BWF profile
Medal record
Women's badminton
Representing Canada
Pan American Games
Bronze medal – third place	2023 Santiago	Women's singles
Pan Am Championships
Silver medal – second place	2021 Guatemala City	Women's singles
Bronze medal – third place	2022 San Salvador	Women's singles
Bronze medal – third place	2024 Guatemala City	Women's singles
Bronze medal – third place	2025 Lima	Women's singles
Bronze medal – third place	2026 Lima	Women's singles
Pan Am Female Cup
Gold medal – first place	2024 São Paulo	Women's team
Gold medal – first place	2026 Guatemala City	Women's team
Silver medal – second place	2022 Acapulco	Women's team
Junior Pan American Games
Gold medal – first place	2021 Cali–Valle	Girls' singles
Gold medal – first place	2021 Cali–Valle	Mixed doubles
Gold medal – first place	2025 Asunción	Girls' singles
Silver medal – second place	2025 Asunción	Mixed doubles

Rachel Chan (born 15 November 2003) is a Canadian badminton player. She won the women's singles title at the 2020 Canadian National Championships and became Canada's youngest national champion. She has represented Canada in the Pan Am Junior Championships multiple times between 2016 until 2019, and the 2019 World Junior Championship making it to round of 32. Rachel won silver at the 2021 Pan Am Championships in women's singles, debuting in her first senior level international tournament, and later cliched the bronze medal at the 2023 Pan American Games.

== Achievements ==
=== Pan American Games ===
Women's singles
Year	Venue	Opponent	Score	Result
2023	Olympic Training Center, Santiago, Chile	(United States) Beiwen Zhang	16–21, 11–21	Bronze

=== Pan Am Championships ===
Women's singles
Year	Venue	Opponent	Score	Result
2021	Sagrado Corazon de Jesus, Guatemala City, Guatemala	(United States) Beiwen Zhang	14–21, 18–21	Silver
2022	Palacio de los Deportes Carlos "El Famoso" Hernández, San Salvador, El Salvador	(United States) Beiwen Zhang	19–21, 22–20, 6–21	Bronze
2024	Teodoro Palacios Flores Gymnasium, Guatemala City, Guatemala	(United States) Beiwen Zhang	15–21, 15–21	Bronze
2025	Videna Poli 2, Lima, Peru	(Canada) Wen Yu Zhang	11–21, 21–18, 13–21	Bronze
2026	High Performance Center VIDENA, Lima, Peru	(Canada) Wen Yu Zhang	15–21, 6–21	Bronze

=== Junior Pan American Games ===
Girls' singles
Year	Venue	Opponent	Score	Result
2021	Pacific Valley Events Center, Yumbo, Valle, Colombia	(United States) Natalie Chi	14–21, 21–5, 21–15	Gold
2025	SND Stadium, Asunción, Paraguay	(Brazil) Juliana Viana Vieira	21–12, 21–16	Gold

Mixed doubles
Year	Venue	Partner	Opponent	Score	Result
2021	Pacific Valley Events Center; Yumbo, Valle, Colombia	(Canada) Brian Yang	(El Salvador) Uriel Canjura (El Salvador) Fátima Centeno	21–13, 21–14	Gold
2025	SND Stadium, Asunción, Paraguay	(Canada) Victor Lai	(Brazil) Davi Silva (Brazil) Juliana Viana Vieira	21–23, 21–14, 19–21	Silver

=== Pan Am Junior Championships ===
Girls' singles
Year	Venue	Opponent	Score	Result
2017	Markham Pan Am Centre, Markham, Canada	(United States) Jolie Wang	21–14, 17–21, 21–12	Gold

Girls' doubles
Year	Venue	Partner	Opponent	Score	Result
2019	CEPS Louis-J.-Robichaud, Moncton, Canada	(Canada) Jeslyn Chow	(United States) Bhaavya S Manikonda (United States) Rachel Ye	21–16, 21–19	Gold

Mixed doubles
Year	Venue	Partner	Opponent	Score	Result
2017	Markham Pan Am Centre, Markham, Canada	(Canada) Ivan Li	(United States) Aaron Low (United States) Tiffany Kuang	21–23, 21–15, 22–24	Bronze
2019	CEPS Louis-J.-Robichaud, Moncton, Canada	(Canada) Ivan Li	(Canada) Victor Lai (Canada) Jessica Cheng	21–18, 19–21, 21–23	Silver

=== BWF International Challenge/Series (3 titles, 4 runners-up) ===
Women's singles
Year	Tournament	Opponent	Score	Result
2023	Canadian International	(Canada) Wenyu Zhang	24–22, 17–21, 20–22	(silver) Runner-up
2024	Portugal International	(India) Devika Sihag	16–21, 16–21	(silver) Runner-up
2024	Irish Open	(Japan) Sakura Masuki	24–26, 10–21	(silver) Runner-up
2025	Portugal International	(Estonia) Kristin Kuuba	22–20, 21–9	(gold) Winner
2025	Guatemala International	(Japan) Shiori Ebihara	21–14, 21–17	(gold) Winner
2026	Brazil International	(Brazil) Juliana Viana Vieira	21–16, 16–21, 15–21	(silver) Runner-up
2026	Austrian Open	(India) Tanvi Patri	21–14, 21–17	(gold) Winner

BWF International Challenge tournament
BWF International Series tournament
BWF Future Series tournament
