= Rubén Castellanos =

Guatemalan badminton player (born 1997)

Personal information
- Born: Rubén Alonso Castellanos España; 18 January 1997 (age 29) Morales, Guatemala
- Height: 1.65 m (5 ft 5 in)
- Weight: 60 kg (132 lb)

Sport
- Country: Guatemala
- Sport: Badminton

Men's singles & doubles
- Highest ranking: 119 (MS 18 October 2022); 84 (MD with Aníbal Marroquín 6 July 2017); 315 (XD with Nikté Sotomayor 15 June 2017)
- Current ranking: 125 (MS), 90 (MD with Christopher Martínez) (8 November 2022)
- BWF profile
Medal record
Men's badminton
Representing Guatemala
Pan Am Championships
Bronze medal – third place	2017 Havana	Men's doubles
Bronze medal – third place	2021 Guatemala City	Men's doubles
Central American and Caribbean Games
Bronze medal – third place	2018 Barranquilla	Mixed team

Rubén Alonso Castellanos España (born 18 January 1997) is a Guatemalan badminton player. He won the men's doubles bronze medals at the 2017 and 2021 Pan Am Championships. He also part of the national team that won the bronze medal at the 2018 Central American and Caribbean Games in Barranquilla, Colombia.

== Achievements ==
=== Pan Am Championships ===
Men's doubles
Year	Venue	Partner	Opponent	Score	Result
2017	Sports City Coliseum; Havana, Cuba	(Guatemala) Aníbal Marroquín	(Canada) Austin Bauer (Canada) Ty Alexander Lindeman	18–21, 12–21	Bronze
2021	Sagrado Corazon de Jesus; Guatemala City, Guatemala	(Guatemala) Christopher Martínez	(Canada) Jason Ho-Shue (Canada) Nyl Yakura	15–21, 7–21	Bronze

=== BWF International Challenge/Series (8 titles, 7 runners-up) ===
Men's singles
Year	Tournament	Opponent	Score	Result
2016	Colombia International	(Guatemala) Rodolfo Ramírez	1–0 retired	(gold) Winner
2019	Guatemala Future Series	(Mexico) Job Castillo	18–21, 15–21	(silver) Runner-up
2021	Santo Domingo Open	(Mexico) Luis Montoya	19–21, 21–19, 21–13	(gold) Winner
2021	Guatemala Future Series	(United States) Don Henley Averia	21–17, 13–21, 24–22	(gold) Winner

Men's doubles
Year	Tournament	Partner	Opponent	Score	Result
2012	Venezuela International	(Guatemala) Adams Rodríguez	(Cuba) Osleni Guerrero (Cuba) Ronald Toledo	21–18, 8–21, 8–21	(silver) Runner-up
2016	Colombia International	(Guatemala) Aníbal Marroquín	(Guatemala) Rudolfo Ramírez (Guatemala) Jonathan Solís	Walkover	(gold) Winner
2017	Guatemala Future Series	(Guatemala) Aníbal Marroquín	(Guatemala) Rudolfo Ramírez (Guatemala) Jonathan Solís	17–21, 13–21	(silver) Runner-up
2018	Guatemala International	(Guatemala) Aníbal Marroquín	(Cuba) Osleni Guerrero (Cuba) Leodannis Martínez	21–12, 21–17	(gold) Winner
2018	El Salvador International	(Guatemala) Aníbal Marroquín	(Guatemala) Brandon Alavardo (Guatemala) Christopher Martínez	17–21, 21–10, 21–16	(gold) Winner
2019	Peru International	(Guatemala) Aníbal Marroquín	(Brazil) Fabricio Farias (Brazil) Francielton Farias	22–20, 21–17	(gold) Winner
2020	Peru Future Series	(Guatemala) Christopher Martínez	(Argentina) Mateo Delmastro (Argentina) Santiago Otero	21–12, 21–12	(gold) Winner
2021	Santo Domingo Open	(Guatemala) Christopher Martínez	(Guatemala) Aníbal Marroquín (Guatemala) Jonathan Solís	10–21, 19–21	(silver) Runner-up
2021	Guatemala Future Series	(Guatemala) Christopher Martínez	(United States) Enrico Asuncion (United States) Don Henley Averia	19–21, 23–25	(silver) Runner-up
2022	Guatemala International	(Guatemala) Christopher Martínez	(Guatemala) Aníbal Marroquín (Guatemala) Jonathan Solís	21–18, 18–21, 8–21	(silver) Runner-up

Mixed doubles
Year	Tournament	Partner	Opponent	Score	Result
2012	Suriname International	(Guatemala) Nikté Sotomayor	(Suriname) Mitchel Wongsodikromo (Suriname) Crystal Leefmans	12–21, 18–21	(silver) Runner-up

BWF International Challenge tournament
BWF International Series tournament
BWF Future Series tournament
