= B. R. Sankeerth =

Indian-Canadian badminton player (born 1997)

Personal information
- Born: 22 December 1997 (age 28) Bangalore, India

Sport
- Country: Canada
- Sport: Badminton

Men's singles & doubles
- Highest ranking: 73 (MS 27 September 2022); 169 (MD with Vinson Chiu 17 March 2020); 279 (XD with Chloe Rowe 29 September 2016)
- BWF profile
Medal record
Men's badminton
Representing Canada
Pan Am Championships
Bronze medal – third place	2021 Guatemala City	Men's singles
Pan Am Male Cup
Gold medal – first place	2018 Tacarigua	Men's team
Gold medal – first place	2022 Acapulco	Men's team
Gold medal – first place	2024 São Paulo	Men's team
Pan Am Mixed Team Championships
Gold medal – first place	2023 Guadalajara	Mixed team

B. R. Sankeerth (born 22 December 1997) is an Indian-born Canadian badminton player. Sankeerth started playing badminton when he was young in Karnataka, India. He had shown his potential as a badminton player by finishing as a runner-up at the U-13 SBM State-ranking junior badminton championship. He clinched two titles at the 2011 Indiranagar 5-Star State-ranking badminton tournament, and was selected to represent India at the 2014 World Junior Championships.

Sankeerth now is part of the Canadian national team. He was a semi-finalist at the BWF Grand Prix event the 2016 Brazil Open in the men's doubles event with Toby Ng - also the runners-up at the 2016 Yonex / K&D Graphics International in the men's doubles event - and in 2017 in the men's singles event.

== Achievements ==
=== Pan Am Championships ===
Men's singles
Year	Venue	Opponent	Score	Result
2021	Sagrado Corazon de Jesus; Guatemala City, Guatemala	(Canada) Brian Yang	21–19, 9–21, 9–21	Bronze

=== BWF International Challenge/Series (2 titles, 3 runners-up) ===
Men's singles
Year	Tournament	Opponent	Score	Result
2017	Yonex / K&D Graphics International	(Chinese Taipei) Lu Chia-hung	21–14, 15–21, 16–21	(silver) Runner-up
2018	Yonex / K&D Graphics International	(United States) Phillips Jap	19–21, 21–19, 21–13	(gold) Winner
2019	Peru Future Series	(Canada) Brian Yang	12–21, 21–11, 21–19	(gold) Winner
2021	Lithuanian International	(France) Alex Lanier	21–18, 21–23, 15–21	(silver) Runner-up

Men's doubles
Year	Tournament	Partner	Opponent	Score	Result
2016	Yonex / K&D Graphics International	(Canada) Nyl Yakura	(Denmark) Frederik Colberg (Denmark) Rasmus Fladberg	8–21, 21–18, 6–21	(silver) Runner-up

BWF International Challenge tournament
BWF International Series tournament
BWF Future Series tournament
