= Mariana Paiz =

Guatemalan badminton player (born 2000)

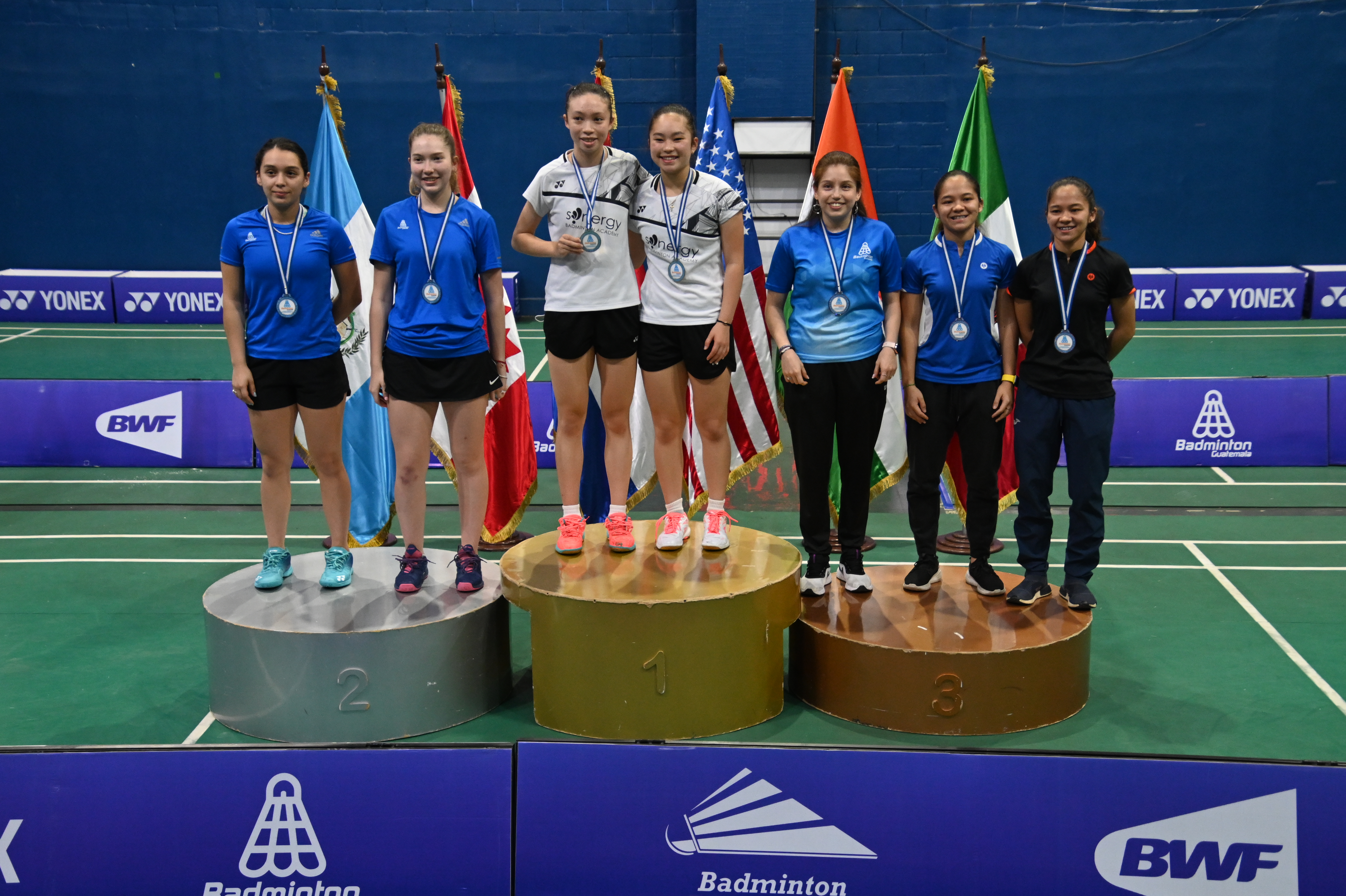

Personal information
- Born: Mariana Isabel Paiz Quan; 4 July 2000 (age 26)
- Height: 1.60 m (5 ft 3 in)
- Weight: 55 kg (121 lb)

Sport
- Country: Guatemala
- Sport: Badminton

Women's singles & doubles
- Highest ranking: 206 (WS 1 March 2018); 79 (WD with Alejandra Paiz 15 November 2022); 76 (XD with Christopher Martínez 15 November 2022)
- BWF profile
Medal record
Women's badminton
Representing Guatemala
Pan Am Championships
Silver medal – second place	2021 Guatemala City	Mixed doubles
Bronze medal – third place	2021 Guatemala City	Women's doubles
Central American and Caribbean Games
Bronze medal – third place	2018 Barranquilla	Mixed team
Representing Centro Caribe Sports
Central American and Caribbean Games
Silver medal – second place	2023 San Salvador	Mixed doubles
Silver medal – second place	2023 San Salvador	Mixed team

Mariana Isabel Paiz Quan (born 4 July 2000) is a Guatemalan badminton player. She competed at the 2015 Pan American Games. Paiz was part of the national team that won the bronze medal at the 2018 Central American and Caribbean Games in Barranquilla, Colombia.

== Achievements ==
=== Pan Am Championships ===
Women's doubles
Year	Venue	Partner	Opponent	Score	Result
2021	Sagrado Corazon de Jesus; Guatemala City, Guatemala	(Guatemala) Alejandra Paiz	(United States) Francesca Corbett (United States) Allison Lee	5–21, 13–21	Bronze

Mixed doubles
Year	Venue	Partner	Opponent	Score	Result
2021	Sagrado Corazon de Jesus; Guatemala City, Guatemala	(Guatemala) Christopher Martínez	(Canada) Joshua Hurlburt-Yu (Canada) Josephine Wu	18–21, 18–21	Silver

=== Central American and Caribbean Games ===
Mixed doubles
Year	Venue	Partner	Opponent	Score	Result
2023	Coliseo Complejo El Polvorín; San Salvador, El Salvador	(Guatemala) Christopher Martínez	(Mexico) Luis Montoya (Mexico) Miriam Rodríguez	5–21, 15–21	Silver

=== BWF International Challenge/Series (6 titles, 9 runners-up) ===
Women's doubles
Year	Tournament	Partner	Opponent	Score	Result
2016	Guatemala International	(Guatemala) Nikté Sotomayor	(Guatemala) Michele Barrios (Guatemala) Kareen Morales	21–18, 21–14	(gold) Winner
2017	Guatemala Future Series	(Guatemala) Diana Corleto	(Guatemala) Michele Barrios (Guatemala) Alejandra Paiz	21–11, 21–15	(gold) Winner
2017	Mercosul International	(Guatemala) Diana Corleto	(Brazil) Paula Pereira (Brazil) Fabiana Silva	14–21, 17–21	(silver) Runner-up
2021	Santo Domingo Open	(Guatemala) Alejandra Paiz	(Guatemala) Diana Corleto (Guatemala) Nikté Sotomayor	11–21, 14–21	(silver) Runner-up
2021	Peru International	(Guatemala) Alejandra Paiz	(Guatemala) Diana Corleto (Guatemala) Nikté Sotomayor	22–24, 7–21	(silver) Runner-up
2022	Guatemala Future Series	(Guatemala) Alejandra Paiz	(El Salvador) Fátima Centeno (El Salvador) Daniela Hernández	21–16, 21–14	(gold) Winner
2023	Giraldilla International	(Guatemala) Alejandra Paiz	(Cuba) Taymara Oropesa (Cuba) Yeily Ortiz	1–4 retired	(silver) Runner-up
2024	Giraldilla International	(Guatemala) Diana Corleto	(Cuba) Taymara Oropesa (Brazil) Fabiana Silva	21–15, 19–21, 21–10	(gold) Winner

Mixed doubles
Year	Tournament	Partner	Opponent	Score	Result
2017	Giraldilla International	(Guatemala) Jonathan Solís	(Cuba) Leodannis Martínez (Cuba) Tahimara Oropeza	2–21, 13–21	(silver) Runner-up
2017	Mercosul International	(Guatemala) Aníbal Marroquín	(Brazil) Artur Pomoceno (Brazil) Fabiana Silva	21–19, 18–21, 21–23	(silver) Runner-up
2021	El Salvador International	(Guatemala) Christopher Martínez	(United States) Kevin Shi (United States) Ishika Jaiswal	21–14, 21–18	(gold) Winner
2022	Guatemala International	(Guatemala) Christopher Martínez	(Guatemala) Jonathan Solís (Guatemala) Diana Corleto	13–21, 21–18, 14–21	(silver) Runner-up
2022	Guatemala Future Series	(Guatemala) Christopher Martínez	(France) Tino Daoudal (France) Malya Hoareau	21–18, 17–21, 19–21	(silver) Runner-up
2023	Giraldilla International	(Guatemala) Christopher Martínez	(Bulgaria) Iliyan Stoynov (Bulgaria) Hristomira Popovska	14–21, 19–21	(silver) Runner-up
2024	Giraldilla International	(Guatemala) Christopher Martínez	(Cuba) Roberto Herrera (Cuba) Leyanis Contreras	21–12, 21–13	(gold) Winner

BWF International Challenge tournament
BWF International Series tournament
BWF Future Series tournament
