= El Salvador International =

International badminton tournament

The El Salvador International is an international badminton tournament held in San Salvador, El Salvador. The event is part of the Badminton World Federation's Future Series and part of the Badminton Pan America's Circuit.

== Past winners ==
Year	Men's singles	Women's singles	Men's doubles	Women's doubles	Mixed doubles	Ref
2018	(Canada) Brian Yang	(Peru) Daniela Macías	(Guatemala) Rubén Castellanos (Guatemala) Aníbal Marroquín	(Peru) Daniela Macías (Peru) Dánica Nishimura	(Canada) Brian Yang (Canada) Catherine Choi	
2019	(El Salvador) Uriel Canjura	(Peru) Daniela Macías	(Guatemala) Jonathan Solís (Guatemala) Aníbal Marroquín	(Peru) Daniela Macías (Peru) Dánica Nishimura	(Guatemala) Jonathan Solís (Guatemala) Diana Corleto	
2020	Cancelled (Note: This tournament, originally to be played from 9 to 13 December, was later cancelled due to the COVID-19 pandemic in El Salvador.)					
2021	(El Salvador) Uriel Canjura	(United States) Ishika Jaiswal	(Brazil) Jonathan Matias (Brazil) Artur Pomoceno	(Brazil) Sania Lima (Brazil) Tamires Santos	(Guatemala) Christopher Martínez (Guatemala) Mariana Paiz	
2022	(El Salvador) Uriel Canjura	(United States) Lauren Lam	(Canada) Kevin Lee (Canada) Ty Alexander Lindeman	(United States) Paula Lynn Cao Hok (United States) Lauren Lam	(Spain) Joan Monroy (Spain) Ania Setien	
2023	(Guatemala) Kevin Cordón	(Brazil) Juliana Viana Vieira	(Canada) Kevin Lee (Canada) Ty Alexander Lindeman	(United States) Francesca Corbett (United States) Allison Lee	(United States) Presley Smith (United States) Allison Lee	
2024	(United States) Mark Alcala	(Brazil) Juliana Viana Vieira	(Brazil) Fabrício Farias (Brazil) Davi Silva	(Brazil) Jaqueline Lima (Brazil) Sâmia Lima	(Brazil) Davi Silva (Brazil) Sania Lima	
2025	(Brazil) Jonathan Matias	(Lithuania) Viltė Paulauskaitė	(Australia) Pramudya Kusumawardana (Australia) Jack Yu	(Lithuania) Viltė Paulauskaitė (Czech Republic) Sharleen van Coppenolle	(United States) Ansen Liu (United States) Charity Lam	
2026						

== Performance by nations ==
As of the 2025 edition

Pos	Nation	MS	WS	MD	WD	XD	Total
1	Brazil	1	2	2	2	1	8
2	United States	1	2	0	2	2	7
3	Guatemala	1	0	2	0	2	5
4	Canada	1	0	2	0	1	4
4	Peru	0	2	0	2	0	4
6	El Salvador	3	0	0	0	0	3
7	Lithuania	0	0	1	0.5	0	1.5
8	Australia	0	0	1	0	0	1
8	Spain	0	0	0	0	1	1
10	Czech Republic	0	0	0	0.5	0	0.5
Total		7	7	7	7	7	35
