= Badminton at the 2015 Pan American Games – Mixed doubles =

Badminton – Mixed doubles at the 2015 Pan American Games
- Venue: Atos Markham Pan Am Centre
- Dates: July 11 - July 16
- Competitors: 52 from 17 nations

Medalists
Gold medal	Phillip Chew; Jamie Subandhi	United States
Silver medal	Toby Ng; Alex Bruce	Canada
Bronze medal	Mario Cuba; Katherine Winder	Peru
Bronze medal	Alex Tjong; Lohaynny Vicente	Brazil

The mixed doubles badminton event at the 2015 Pan American Games will be held from July 11- 16 at the Atos Markham Pan Am Centre in Toronto. The defending Pan American Games champion is Toby Ng are Grace Gao of Canada.

The athletes will be drawn into an elimination stage draw. Once a team lost a match, it will be not longer able to compete. Each match will be contested as the best of three games.

== Schedule ==
All times are Central Standard Time (UTC-6).

Date	Time	Round
July 11, 2015	13:05	First Round
July 12, 2015	16:00	Second Round
July 13, 2015	10:30	Quarterfinals
July 14, 2015	10:30	Semifinals
July 16, 2015	14:45	Final

== Seeds ==
1. Phillip Chew / Jamie Subandhi (USA) (champions)
2. Toby Ng / Alex Bruce (CAN) (final)
3. Mario Cuba / Katherine Winder (PER) (semifinals)
4. Howard Shu / Eva Lee (USA) (second round)

== Results ==
=== Finals ===
Semifinals
1	Phillip Chew (United States) Jamie Subandhi (USA)	21	21
3	Mario Cuba (Peru) Katherine Winder (PER)	18	14
Alex Tjong (Brazil) Lohaynny Vicente (BRA)	17	16
2	Toby Ng (Canada) Alex Bruce (CAN)	21	21

Final
1	Phillip Chew (United States) Jamie Subandhi (USA)	21	21	21
2	Toby Ng (Canada) Alex Bruce (CAN)	9	23	12

=== Top half ===
First Round
L Muñoz (Mexico) C González (MEX)	21	16	21
H Arthuso (Brazil) F Silva (BRA)	16	21	16
D Darmohoetomo (Suriname) P Tjitrodipo (SUR)	16	12
W Cabrera (Dominican Republic) B Polanco (DOM)	21	21
D Reid (Jamaica) R Williams (JAM)	21	21
J Lama (Venezuela) D Ortiz Prada (VEN)	14	14
G Jassiel (El Salvador) F Centeno (ESA)	11	6
L Martínez (Cuba) T Oropeza (CUB)	21	21
C Araya (Chile) T Chou (CHI)	21	21
N Ramdhani (Guyana) P Ramdhani (GUY)	7	15

Second Round
1	P Chew (United States) J Subandhi (USA)	21	21
L Muñoz (Mexico) C González (MEX)	9	17
P Macagno (Argentina) F Bernatene (ARG)	10	13
W Cabrera (Dominican Republic) B Polanco (DOM)	21	21
3	M Cuba (Peru) K Winder (PER)	21	21
D Reid (Jamaica) R Williams (JAM)	19	11
L Martínez (Cuba) T Oropeza (CUB)	21	21
C Araya (Chile) T Chou (CHI)	15	16

Quarterfinals
1	P Chew (United States) J Subandhi (USA)	21	21
W Cabrera (Dominican Republic) B Polanco (DOM)	9	8
3	M Cuba (Peru) K Winder (PER)	21	21
L Martínez (Cuba) T Oropeza (CUB)	12	11

Semifinals
1	P Chew (United States) J Subandhi (USA)	21	21
3	M Cuba (Peru) K Winder (PER)	18	14

=== Bottom half ===
First Round
I León (Chile) C Macaya (CHI)	21	19	19
N Javier (Dominican Republic) D Saturria (DOM)	19	21	21
M Zambrano (Ecuador) E Zambrano (ECU)	21	19
G Henry (Jamaica) K Wynter (JAM)	23	21
A Tjong (Brazil) Lo Vicente (BRA)	21	21
H Humblers (Guatemala) N Sotomayor (GUA)	10	18
E Reyes (Cuba) M Azcuy Perez (CUB)	21	24
D Thorpe (Barbados) S Scott (BAR)	13	22
A Corpancho (Peru) LM Zornoza (PER)	21	21
A Ocegueda (Mexico) S Solis (MEX)	15	13

Second Round
N Javier (Dominican Republic) D Saturria (DOM)	17	21	21
G Henry (Jamaica) K Wynter (JAM)	21	17	23
A Tjong (Brazil) Lo Vicente (BRA)	21	21
4	H Shu (United States) E Lee (USA)	17	18
E Reyes (Cuba) M Azcuy Perez (CUB)	21	21
T Thouyaret (Argentina) B Berruezo (ARG)	7	11
A Corpancho (Peru) LM Zornoza (PER)	19	16
2	T Ng (Canada) A Bruce (CAN)	21	21

Quarterfinals
G Henry (Jamaica) K Wynter (JAM)	11	17
A Tjong (Brazil) Lo Vicente (BRA)	21	21
E Reyes (Cuba) M Azcuy Perez (CUB)	8	12
2	T Ng (Canada) A Bruce (CAN)	21	21

Semifinals
A Tjong (Brazil) Lo Vicente (BRA)	17	16
2	T Ng (Canada) A Bruce (CAN)	21	21
