= 2019 Pan Am Badminton Championships =

Tournament details
- Dates: 14–17 February (Team event); 25–28 April (Individual event)
- Edition: 23
- Venue: Centro de Alto Rendimiento La Videna (Team event); Gimnasio Olímpico (Individual event)
- Location: Lima, Peru (Team event); Aguascalientes, Mexico (Individual event)

The XXIII 2019 Pan Am Badminton Championships was a continental championships tournament of badminton in Pan America. This tournament was held as two events in different countries. From 14 to 17 February, the team event was held in Lima, Peru. From 25 to 28 April, the individual event was held in Aguascalientes, Mexico.

== Tournament ==
The team event of 2019 Pan Am Badminton Championships officially XXIII Pan Am Mixed Team Continental Championships, was a team continental championships tournament of badminton, to crown the best mixed team in Pan America. This event was organized by the Badminton Pan Am and Federación Deportiva Peruana de Badminton. 11 teams entered the tournament.

The individual event of Pan Am Badminton Championships was an individual continental championships tournament of badminton, to crowns the best male and female players and pairs in Pan America. The ranking points of this tournament were graded as BWF World Tour Super 100 event. This event was organized by the Badminton Pan Am and Federacion Mexicana de Badminton.

=== Venue ===
- The team event was held at Centro de Alto Rendimiento La Videna in Lima, Peru.
- The individual event venue was held at Gimnasio Olímpico in Aguascalientes, Mexico.

=== Point distribution ===
Below is the tables with the point distribution for each phase of the individual event tournament based on the BWF points system for the Pan Am Badminton Championships.

Winner	Runner-up	3/4	5/8	9/16	17/32	33/64
5,500	4,680	3,850	3,030	2,110	1,290	510

== Medalists ==
Event	Gold	Silver	Bronze
Mixed Teams	Canada; Brian Yang; Brittney Tam; Catherine Choi; Duncan Yao; Jason Ho-Shue; Josephine Wu; Joshua Hurlburt-Yu; Nyl Yakura; Talia Ng	United States; Andrew Zhang; Breanna Chi; Chen Kuei-ya; Jennie Gai; Katherine Tor; Natalie Chi; Noel Carino; Phillip Chew; Ryan Chew; Timothy Lam	Brazil; Artur Pomoceno; Fabiana Silva; Fabricio Farias; Francielton Farias; Izak Batalha; Jaqueline Lima; Lohaynny Vicente; Luana Vicente; Matheus Voigt; Sâmia Lima; Tamires Santos; Waleson Santos
Men's singles	(Cuba) Osleni Guerrero	(Guatemala) Kevin Cordón	(Mexico) Job Castillo
Men's singles	(Cuba) Osleni Guerrero	(Guatemala) Kevin Cordón	(Canada) Jason Ho-Shue
Women's singles	(Canada) Michelle Li	(Canada) Brittney Tam	(United States) Crystal Pan
Women's singles	(Canada) Michelle Li	(Canada) Brittney Tam	(United States) Jennie Gai
Men's doubles	(Canada) Jason Ho-Shue (Canada) Nyl Yakura	(Cuba) Osleni Guerrero (Cuba) Leodannis Martínez	(Jamaica) Gareth Henry (Jamaica) Samuel Ricketts
Men's doubles	(Canada) Jason Ho-Shue (Canada) Nyl Yakura	(Cuba) Osleni Guerrero (Cuba) Leodannis Martínez	(Mexico) Andrés López (Mexico) Luis Montoya
Women's doubles	(Canada) Rachel Honderich (Canada) Kristen Tsai	(Canada) Catherine Choi (Canada) Josephine Wu	(Mexico) Sabrina Solis (Mexico) Vanessa Villalobos
Women's doubles	(Canada) Rachel Honderich (Canada) Kristen Tsai	(Canada) Catherine Choi (Canada) Josephine Wu	(Brazil) Jaqueline Lima (Brazil) Sâmia Lima
Mixed doubles	(Canada) Joshua Hurlburt-Yu (Canada) Josephine Wu	(Brazil) Fabricio Farias (Brazil) Jaqueline Lima	(Canada) Nicolas Nguyen (Canada) Alexandra Mocanu
Mixed doubles	(Canada) Joshua Hurlburt-Yu (Canada) Josephine Wu	(Brazil) Fabricio Farias (Brazil) Jaqueline Lima	(Canada) Nyl Yakura (Canada) Kristen Tsai

=== Medal table ===
==== Team events ====
* Host nation (Peru)

Rank	Nation	Gold	Silver	Bronze	Total
1	Canada	1	0	0	1
2	United States	0	1	0	1
3	Brazil	0	0	1	1
Totals (3 entries)		1	1	1	3

==== Individual events ====
* Host nation (Mexico)

Rank	Nation	Gold	Silver	Bronze	Total
1	Canada	4	2	3	9
2	Cuba	1	1	0	2
3	Brazil	0	1	1	2
4	Guatemala	0	1	0	1
5	Mexico*	0	0	3	3
6	United States	0	0	2	2
7	Jamaica	0	0	1	1
Totals (7 entries)		5	5	10	20

== Team events ==
=== Group A ===
Pos	Team	Pld	W	L	MF	MA	MD	GF	GA	GD	PF	PA	PD	Pts	Qualification
1	Canada	2	2	0	10	0	+10	20	2	+18	451	239	+212	2	Knockout stage
2	Peru	2	1	1	5	5	0	12	10	+2	385	335	+50	1	Knockout stage
3	Colombia	2	0	2	0	10	−10	0	20	−20	158	420	−262	0	

Source: TS

=== Group B ===
Pos	Team	Pld	W	L	MF	MA	MD	GF	GA	GD	PF	PA	PD	Pts	Qualification
1	Brazil	3	3	0	14	1	+13	28	3	+25	640	375	+265	3	Knockout stage
2	Cuba	3	2	1	11	4	+7	23	9	+14	612	467	+145	2	Knockout stage
3	Dominican Republic	3	1	2	5	10	−5	11	23	−12	513	642	−129	1	
4	Argentina	3	0	3	0	15	−15	3	30	−27	393	674	−281	0	

Source: TS

=== Group C ===
Pos	Team	Pld	W	L	MF	MA	MD	GF	GA	GD	PF	PA	PD	Pts	Qualification
1	United States	3	3	0	12	3	+9	24	9	+15	619	515	+104	3	Knockout stage
2	Mexico	3	2	1	9	6	+3	20	14	+6	628	523	+105	2	Knockout stage
3	Guatemala	3	1	2	8	7	+1	19	15	+4	607	570	+37	1	
4	Jamaica	3	0	3	1	14	−13	3	28	−25	384	630	−246	0	

Source: TS

=== Knockout stage ===
==== 1st to 6th place ====
First round
Cuba	3
Peru	1
Mexico	1
United States	3

Semifinals
Canada	3
Cuba	0
Brazil	2
United States	3
Play-off 5/6
6	Peru	1
5	Mexico	3

Final
Canada	3
United States	0
Play-off 3/4
4	Cuba	0
Brazil	3

==== 7th to 9th place ====
Semi-finals 7-9
Colombia	0
Dominican Republic	3

Play-off 7/8
Guatemala	3
Dominican Republic	0

==== 10th to 11th place ====
Play-off 10/11
Argentina	0
Jamaica	3

=== Final standings ===
Rank	Team
1	Canada
2	United States
3	Brazil
4	Cuba
5	Mexico
6	Peru
7	Guatemala
8	Dominican Republic
9	Colombia
10	Jamaica
11	Argentina

== Individual event ==
=== Men's singles ===
==== Seeds ====
1. (Brazil) Ygor Coelho (quarterfinals)
2. (Canada) Jason Ho-Shue (semifinals)
3. (Guatemala) Kevin Cordón (final)
4. (Cuba) Osleni Guerrero (champions)
5. (Mexico) Lino Muñoz (quarterfinals)
6. (Mexico) Job Castillo (semifinals)
7. (United States) Timothy Lam (second round)
8. (Brazil) Artur Pomoceno (quarterfinals)

==== Finals ====
Semifinals
6	(Mexico) Job Castillo	9	12
3	(Guatemala) Kevin Cordón	21	21
4	(Cuba) Osleni Guerrero	16	21	21
2	(Canada) Jason Ho-Shue	21	19	16

Final
3	(Guatemala) Kevin Cordón	11	20
4	(Cuba) Osleni Guerrero	21	22

==== Top half ====
===== Section 1 =====
First Round
(Cuba) L Martínez	21	11	12
(Canada) B Yang	17	21	21
(Mexico) L Montoya	21	21
(Brazil) I Batalha	11	18

Second Round
1	(Brazil) Y Coelho	21	21
(United States) V Chiu	8	11
(Mexico) G Saavedra
(Canada) B Yang	w	/	o
6	(Mexico) J Castillo	21	21
(Peru) B B Deza	9	10
(Panama) K Seixas	14	12
(Mexico) L Montoya	21	21

Third Round
1	(Brazil) Y Coelho	15	21	21
(Canada) B Yang	21	13	18
6	(Mexico) J Castillo	21	10	21
(Mexico) L Montoya	13	21	7

Quarter-finals
1	(Brazil) Y Coelho	21	21	15
6	(Mexico) J Castillo	23	18	21

===== Section 2 =====
First Round
(Venezuela) M Quijada	21	22
(Jamaica) J Angus	15	20
(United States) H Shu	24	21	21
(Colombia) J Noguera	26	7	19
(Mexico) J Rodriguez	16	14
(Peru) J Guevara	21	21

Second Round
3	(Guatemala) K Cordón	21	21
(Jamaica) G Henry	15	16
(Canada) B. R. Sankeerth	21	21
(Venezuela) M Quijada	12	17
7	(United States) T Lam	14	20
(United States) H Shu	21	22
(Dominican Republic) C Brito	17	21	24
(Peru) J Guevara	21	18	22

Third Round
3	(Guatemala) K Cordón	21	21
(Canada) B. R. Sankeerth	19	13
(United States) H Shu	21	21
(Dominican Republic) C Brito	14	16

Quarter-finals
3	(Guatemala) K Cordón	21	21
(United States) H Shu	16	11

==== Bottom half ====
===== Section 3 =====
First Round
(Suriname) S Opti	21	19	18
(Dominican Republic) W Cabrera	12	21	21
(Peru) D la Torre	17	9
(Guatemala) H Humblers	21	21
(Jamaica) S Ricketts	21	21
(Dominican Republic) W Brea	18	16

Second Round
(Dominican Republic) W Cabrera	14	7
(El Salvador) U Canjura	21	21
(Guatemala) H Humblers	14	21	16
5	(Mexico) L Muñoz	21	18	21
(Jamaica) S Ricketts	13	19
(Brazil) W Santos	21	21
(Barbados) G Robinson	8	10
4	(Cuba) O Guerrero	21	21

Third Round
(El Salvador) U Canjura	15	14
5	(Mexico) L Muñoz	21	21
(Brazil) W Santos	17	12
4	(Cuba) O Guerrero	21	21

Quarter-finals
5	(Mexico) L Muñoz	21	13
4	(Cuba) O Guerrero	23	21

===== Section 4 =====
First Round
(United States) N Waller	17	11
(Guatemala) R Castellanos	21	21
(Peru) D Subauste	21	21	12
(Costa Rica) G Cavallotti	23	17	21
(Dominican Republic) Y Linarez	12	12
(Chile) A Medel	21	21

Second Round
(Guatemala) R Castellanos	21	18	21
(Mexico) A Hernández	12	21	16
(Costa Rica) G Cavallotti	8	20
8	(Brazil) A Pomoceno	21	22
(Chile) A Medel	22	16
(Canada) A Zhuang	24	21
(Ecuador) A Baque	7	9
2	(Canada) J Ho-Shue	21	21

Third Round
(Guatemala) R Castellanos	21	15	16
8	(Brazil) A Pomoceno	18	21	21
(Canada) A Zhuang	12	13
2	(Canada) J Ho-shue	21	21

Quarter-finals
8	(Brazil) A Pomoceno	21	8	7
2	(Canada) J Ho-Shue	11	21	21

=== Women's singles ===
==== Seeds ====
1. (Canada) Michelle Li (champions)
2. (Canada) Brittney Tam (final)
3. (United States) Crystal Pan (semifinals)
4. (United States) Disha Gupta (third round)
5. (United States) Isabel Zhong (second round)
6. (Peru) Daniela Macías (second round)
7. (Brazil) Fabiana Silva (quarterfinals)
8. (United States) Jennie Gai (semifinals)

==== Finals ====
Semifinals
1	(Canada) Michelle Li	21	21
3	(United States) Crystal Pan	15	6
8	(United States) Jennie Gai	8	21	18
2	(Canada) Brittney Tam	21	14	21

Final
1	(Canada) Michelle Li	21	24
2	(Canada) Brittney Tam	15	22

==== Top half ====
===== Section 1 =====
First Round

Second Round
1	(Canada) Michelle Li	21	21
(El Salvador) K Lara	11	7
(Venezuela) D Mendoza	21	21
(Ecuador) M Zambrano	18	13
5	(United States) I Zhong	13	21	8
(Dominican Republic) N Jiménez	21	14	21
(Colombia) J Giraldo	21	17	26
(Mexico) V Villalobos	14	21	24

Third Round
1	(Canada) M Li	21	21
(Venezuela) D Mendoza	9	15
(Dominican Republic) N Jiménez	21	21
(Colombia) J Giraldo	19	14

Quarterfinals
1	(Canada) M Li	21	21
(Dominican Republic) N Jiménez	15	7

===== Section 2 =====
First Round
(Peru) F Saponara	21	21
(Guatemala) D Corleto	17	18

Second Round
3	(United States) C Pan	24	21	21
(Mexico) S Solis	26	18	14
(Cuba) Y Ortiz	21	15	12
(Brazil) J Lima	19	21	21
6	(Peru) D Macías	21	14	16
(Brazil) S Lima	18	21	21
(Peru) Y Y Cao	18	10
(Peru) F Saponara	21	21

Third Round
3	(United States) C Pan	21	21
(Brazil) J Lima	14	17
(Brazil) S Lima	21	18	23
(Peru) F Saponara	16	21	21

Quarterfinals
3	(United States) C Pan	16	21	21
(Brazil) S Lima	21	8	15

==== Bottom half ====
===== Section 3 =====
First Round
(Mexico) H Gaitan	21	15	21
(Peru) I Castillo	13	21	14

Second Round
(Mexico) H Gaitan	11
(Ecuador) G Pluas	5^{r}
(Costa Rica) L Villalobos	5	15
8	(United States) J Gai	21	21
(Canada) C Choi	21	11
(Mexico) M Ugalde	23	21
(Dominican Republic) A Acosta	12	15
4	(United States) D Gupta	21	21

Third Round
(Mexico) H Gaitan	16	22	19
8	(United States) J Gai	21	20	21
(Mexico) M Ugalde	21	21
4	(United States) D Gupta	14	17

Quarterfinals
8	(United States) J Gai	21	21
(Mexico) M Ugalde	15	16

===== Section 4 =====
First Round

Second Round
(Guatemala) N Sotomayor	21	21
(Dominican Republic) B Polanco	9	13
(Guatemala) M Paiz	14	17
7	(Brazil) F Silva	21	21
(Cuba) T Oropeza	11	16
(Canada) T Ng	21	21
(Jamaica) T Richardson	4	12
2	(Canada) B Tam	21	21

Third Round
(Guatemala) N Sotomayor	18	19
7	(Brazil) F Silva	21	21
(Canada) T Ng	21	20	15
2	(Canada) B Tam	17	22	21

Quarterfinals
7	(Brazil) F Silva	17	9
2	(Canada) B Tam	21	21

=== Men's doubles ===
==== Seeds ====
1. (Canada) Jason Ho-Shue / Nyl Yakura (champions)
2. (United States) Phillip Chew / Ryan Chew (quarterfinals)
3. (Canada) Joshua Hurlburt-Yu / Duncan Yao (quarterfinals)
4. (Guatemala) Jonathan Solís / Rodolfo Ramírez (quarterfinals)

==== Finals ====
Semifinals
1	(Canada) Jason Ho-Shue (Canada) Nyl Yakura	21	21
(Jamaica) Gareth Henry (Jamaica) Samuel Ricketts	15	13
(Mexico) Andrés López (Mexico) Luis Montoya	23	19
(Cuba) Osleni Guerrero (Cuba) Leodannis Martínez	25	21

Final
1	(Canada) Jason Ho-Shue (Canada) Nyl Yakura	21	20	21
(Cuba) Osleni Guerrero (Cuba) Leodannis Martínez	11	22	10

==== Top half ====
===== Section 1 =====
First Round

Second Round
1	(Canada) J Ho-Shue (Canada) N Yakura	21	21
(Brazil) Fa Farias (Brazil) Fr Farias	7	17
(Mexico) J Castillo (Mexico) L Muñoz	21	21
(United States) V Chiu (United States) H Shu	16	17

Quarterfinals
1	(Canada) J Ho-Shue (Canada) N Yakura	21	21
(Mexico) J Castillo (Mexico) L Muñoz	16	14

===== Section 2 =====
First Round

Second Round
4	(Guatemala) J Solís (Guatemala) R Ramírez	21	21
(Dominican Republic) W Cabrera (Dominican Republic) N Javier	11	12
(Peru) J Guevara (Peru) D la Torre	19	17
(Jamaica) G Henry (Jamaica) S Ricketts	21	21

Quarterfinals
4	(Guatemala) J Solís (Guatemala) R Ramírez	17	17
(Jamaica) G Henry (Jamaica) S Ricketts	21	21

==== Bottom half ====
===== Section 3 =====
First Round
(Dominican Republic) W Brea (Dominican Republic) C Brito	16	19
(Guatemala) R Castellanos (Guatemala) A Marroquín	21	21

Second Round
(Guatemala) R Castellanos (Guatemala) A Marroquín	13	13
(Mexico) A López (Mexico) L Montoya	21	21
(Brazil) I Batalha (Brazil) W Santos	18	19
3	(Canada) J Hurlburt-Yu (Canada) D Yao	21	21

Quarterfinals
(Mexico) A López (Mexico) L Montoya	21	21
3	(Canada) J Hurlburt-Yu (Canada) D Yao	13	19

===== Section 4 =====
First Round

Second Round
(Cuba) O Guerrero (Cuba) L Martínez	21	21
(Peru) M Cuba (Peru) D Mini	14	15
(El Salvador) U Canjura (Chile) A Medel	12	19
2	(United States) P Chew (United States) R Chew	21	21

Quarterfinals
(Cuba) O Guerrero (Cuba) L Martínez	21	21
2	(United States) P Chew (United States) R Chew	16	15

=== Women's doubles ===
==== Seeds ====
1. (Canada) Rachel Honderich / Kristen Tsai (champions)
2. (United States) Ariel Lee / Sydney Lee (quarterfinals)

==== Finals ====
Semifinals
1	(Canada) Rachel Honderich (Canada) Kristen Tsai	21	21
(Brazil) Jaqueline Lima (Brazil) Sâmia Lima	17	8
(Canada) Catherine Choi (Canada) Josephine Wu	21	21
(Mexico) Sabrina Solis (Mexico) Vanessa Villalobos	9	15

Final
1	(Canada) Rachel Honderich (Canada) Kristen Tsai	21	27
(Canada) Catherine Choi (Canada) Josephine Wu	15	25

==== Top half ====
===== Section 1 =====
First Round				Quarter-finals
				1	(Canada) R Honderich (Canada) K Tsai	21	21
					(Guatemala) D Corleto (Guatemala) N Sotomayor	3	6
(Guatemala) D Corleto (Guatemala) N Sotomayor	21	14	21		(Guatemala) D Corleto (Guatemala) N Sotomayor	3	6
(United States) E Kan (United States) I Zhong	17	21	19

===== Section 2 =====
First Round
(Peru) D Macías (Peru) D Nishimura	21	21
(Cuba) T Oropeza (Cuba) Y Ortiz	13	12
(Brazil) J Lima (Brazil) S Lima	21	21
(Mexico) H Gaitan (Mexico) A Valero	14	13

Quarter-finals
(Peru) D Macías (Peru) D Nishimura	18	21	15
(Brazil) J Lima (Brazil) S Lima	21	10	21

==== Bottom half ====
===== Section 3 =====
First Round
(Peru) I Castillo (Peru) P la Torre	24	21
(Guatemala) A Paiz (Guatemala) M Paiz	22	16
(Mexico) C González (Mexico) M Ugalde	11	7
(Canada) C Choi (Canada) J Wu	21	21

Quarter-finals
(Peru) I Castillo (Peru) P la Torre	13	14
(Canada) C Choi (Canada) J Wu	21	21

===== Section 4 =====
First Round			Quarter-finals
(Dominican Republic) N Jiménez (Dominican Republic) B Polanco	13	19
(Mexico) S Solis (Mexico) V Villalobos	21	21
(Mexico) S Solis (Mexico) V Villalobos	21	21		(Mexico) S Solis (Mexico) V Villalobos	27	21
			2	(United States) A Lee (United States) S Lee	25	10

=== Mixed doubles ===
==== Seeds ====
1. (Canada) Joshua Hurlburt-Yu / Josephine Wu (champions)
2. (United States) Mathew Fogarty / Isabel Zhong (second round)
3. (Canada) Nyl Yakura / Kristen Tsai (semifinals)
4. (Guatemala) Jonathan Solís / Diana Corleto (quarterfinals)

==== Finals ====
Semifinals
1	(Canada) Joshua Hurlburt-Yu (Canada) Josephine Wu	21	21
(Canada) Nicolas Nguyen (Canada) Alexandra Mocanu	11	14
3	(Canada) Nyl Yakura (Canada) Kristen Tsai	22	19
(Brazil) Fabricio Farias (Brazil) Jaqueline Lima	24	21

Final
1	(Canada) Joshua Hurlburt-Yu (Canada) Josephine Wu	21	21
(Brazil) Fabricio Farias (Brazil) Jaqueline Lima	14	19

==== Top half ====
===== Section 1 =====
First Round
(Mexico) A Lopez (Mexico) C González	21	21
(Colombia) J Noguera (Colombia) J Giraldo	12	14
(Canada) T A Lindeman (Canada) R Honderich	20	21	21
(United States) H Shu (United States) P L Obañana	22	18	9
(Cuba) L Martínez (Cuba) Y Ortiz	21	21
(Dominican Republic) C Brito (Dominican Republic) B Polanco	16	7

Second Round
1	(Canada) J Hurlburt-Yu (Canada) J Wu	21	21
(Mexico) A López (Mexico) C González	18	16
(Canada) T A Lindeman (Canada) R Honderich	21	21
(Cuba) L Martínez (Cuba) Y Ortiz	14	9

Quarterfinals
1	(Canada) J Hurlburt-Yu (Canada) J Wu	21	24
(Canada) T A Lindeman (Canada) R Honderich	15	22

===== Section 2 =====
First Round
4	(Guatemala) J Solís (Guatemala) D Corleto	21	21
(Peru) M Cuba (Peru) D Macías	18	18
(Peru) D Subauste (Peru) Y Y Cao	19	25	13
(United States) P Chew (United States) A Lee	21	23	21
(Canada) N Nguyen (Canada) A Mocanu	13	21	21
(Brazil) A Pomoceno (Brazil) F Silva	21	18	18
(United States) R Chew (United States) S Lee	21	21
(Venezuela) M Quijada (Venezuela) D Mendoza	11	18

Second Round
4	(Guatemala) J Solís (Guatemala) D Corleto	21	20	21
(United States) P Chew (United States) A Lee	17	22	14
(Canada) N Nguyen (Canada) A Mocanu	26	21
(United States) R Chew (United States) S Lee	24	14

Quarterfinals
4	(Guatemala) J Solís (Guatemala) D Corleto	20	21	17
(Canada) N Nguyen (Canada) A Mocanu	22	18	21

==== Bottom half ====
===== Section 3 =====
First Round
(El Salvador) U Canjura (El Salvador) K Lara	17	12
(Ecuador) A Baque (Ecuador) M Zambrano	21	21
(Brazil) W Santos (Brazil) S Lima	21	21
(Dominican Republic) N Javier (Dominican Republic) N Jiménez	18	17
(Guatemala) A Marroquín (Guatemala) M Paiz	21	21
(Dominican Republic) W Brea (Dominican Republic) A Acosta	12	17
(Mexico) A Hernández (Mexico) M Ugalde	19	15
3	(Canada) N Yakura (Canada) K Tsai	21	21

Second Round
(Ecuador) A Baque (Ecuador) M Zambrano	11	9
(Brazil) W Santos (Brazil) S Lima	21	21
(Guatemala) A Marroquín (Guatemala) M Paiz	18^{r}
3	(Canada) N Yakura (Canada) K Tsai	19

Quarterfinals
(Brazil) W Santos (Brazil) S Lima	18	21	13
3	(Canada) N Yakura (Canada) K Tsai	21	16	21

===== Section 4 =====
First Round
(Costa Rica) G Cavallotti (Costa Rica) L Villalobos	15	11
(Brazil) Fa Farias (Brazil) J Lima	21	21
(Mexico) L Montoya (Mexico) V Villalobos	18	21	21
(Peru) B Barrueto (Peru) F Saponara	21	19	15
(Cuba) O Guerrero (Cuba) T Oropeza	21	21
(Peru) D Mini (Peru) D Nishimura	8	15

Second Round
(Brazil) Fa Farias (Brazil) J Lima	21	21
(Mexico) L Montoya (Mexico) V Villalobos	15	12
(Cuba) O Guerrero (Cuba) T Oropeza	21	21
2	(United States) M Fogarty (United States) I Zhong	8	13

Quarterfinals
(Brazil) Fa Farias (Brazil) J Lima	14	21	21
(Cuba) O Guerrero (Cuba) T Oropeza	21	15	17
