= Antonio Ocegueda =

Mexican badminton player (born 1993)

Personal information
- Born: 18 May 1993 (age 33)
- Height: 1.70 m (5 ft 7 in)
- Weight: 60 kg (132 lb)

Sport
- Country: Mexico
- Sport: Badminton

Men's
- Highest ranking: 164 (MS) 11 September 2014; 60 (MD) 18 February 2015; 196 (XD) 17 April 2015
- BWF profile
Medal record
Badminton
Representing Mexico
Central American and Caribbean Games
Silver medal – second place	2014 Veracruz	Mixed team
Bronze medal – third place	2014 Veracruz	Men's doubles

Antonio Ocegueda (born 18 May 1993) is a Mexican male badminton player. He competed at the 2011 and 2015 Pan American Games. In 2014, he won the silver medal in the mixed team event and the bronze medal in the men's doubles event at the Central American and Caribbean Games.

== Achievements ==
=== Central American and Caribbean Games ===
Men's Doubles

Year	Venue	Partner	Opponent	Score	Result
2014	Omega Complex, Veracruz, Mexico	(Mexico) Job Castillo	(Guatemala) Kevin Cordon (Guatemala) Anibal Marroquin	19-21, 15–21	Bronze

=== BWF International Challenge/Series ===
Men's Doubles

Year	Tournament	Partner	Opponent	Score	Result
2015	Trinidad and Tobago International	(Mexico) Job Castillo	(Mexico) Luis Ramon Garrido (Mexico) Lino Muñoz	16-21, 24–22, 19–21	(silver) Runner-up
2014	Internacional Mexicano	(Mexico) Job Castillo	(Mexico) Arturo Hernandez (Mexico) Lino Muñoz	21-14, 21–15	(gold) Winner
2013	Internacional Mexicano	(Mexico) Job Castillo	(New Zealand) Kevin Dennerly-Minturn (New Zealand) Oliver Leydon-Davis	21-17, 12–21, 6-21	(silver) Runner-up

BWF International Challenge tournament
BWF International Series tournament
BWF Future Series tournament
