= Nikté Sotomayor =

Guatemalan badminton player (born 1994)

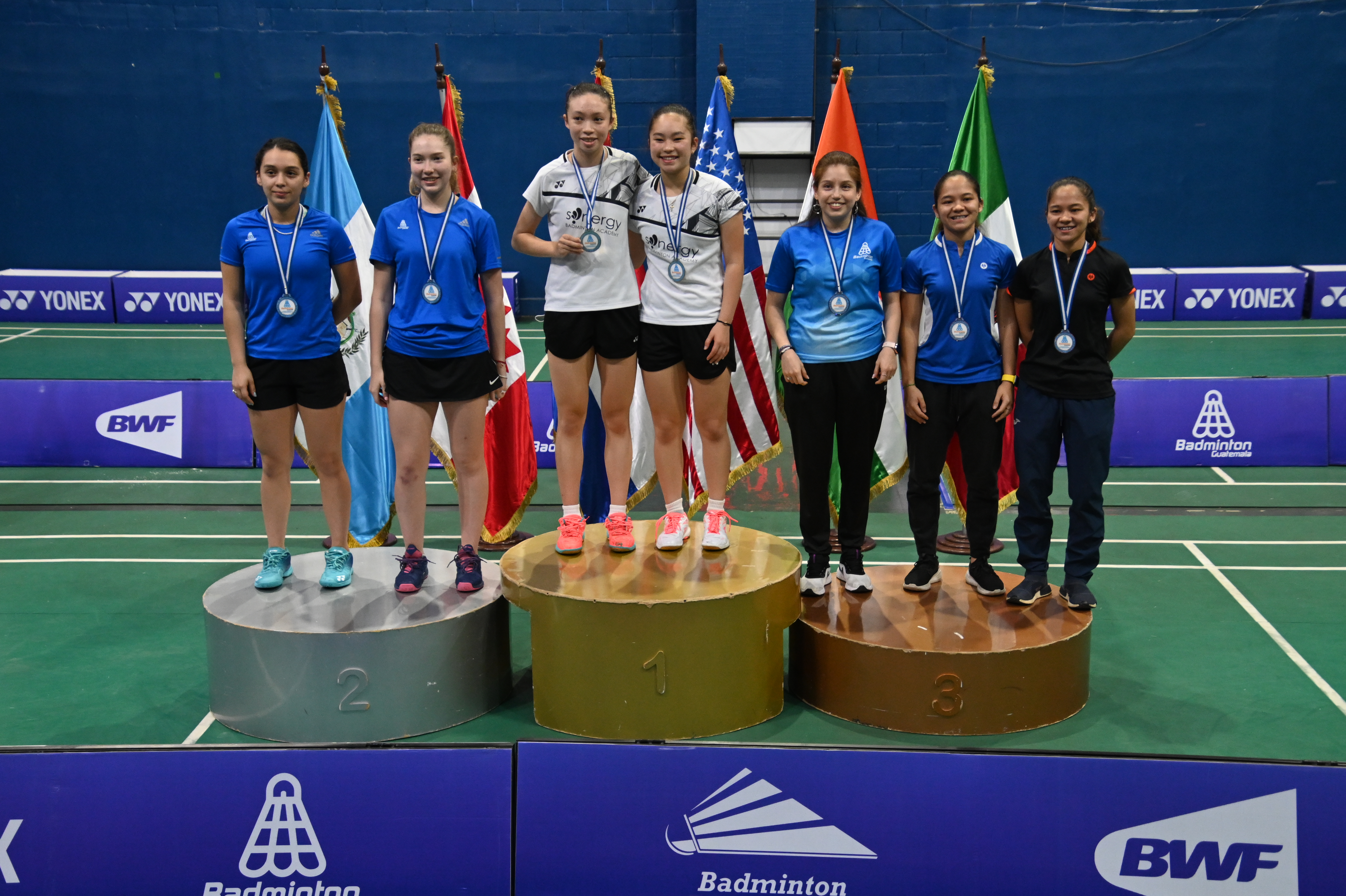

Personal information
- Nickname: Niky
- Born: Nikté Alejandra Sotomayor Ovando; 1 July 1994 (age 32) Retalhuleu, Guatemala
- Height: 1.60 m (5 ft 3 in)
- Weight: 51.7 kg (114 lb)

Sport
- Country: Guatemala
- Sport: Badminton
- Coached by: José María Solís Sánchez

Women's singles & doubles
- Highest ranking: 89 (WS 31 January 2023); 63 (WD 30 July 2019); 62 (XD 2 April 2015)
- BWF profile
Medal record
Women's badminton
Representing Guatemala
Pan American Games
Bronze medal – third place	2019 Lima	Women's singles
Pan Am Championships
Bronze medal – third place	2021 Guatemala City	Women's doubles
Central American and Caribbean Games
Gold medal – first place	2014 Veracruz	Mixed team
Silver medal – second place	2014 Veracruz	Women's singles
Silver medal – second place	2026 Santo Domingo	Mixed team
Bronze medal – third place	2010 Mayagüez	Mixed doubles
Bronze medal – third place	2010 Mayagüez	Women's team
Bronze medal – third place	2014 Veracruz	Women's doubles
Bronze medal – third place	2014 Veracruz	Mixed doubles
Bronze medal – third place	2018 Barranquilla	Mixed team
Bronze medal – third place	2026 Santo Domingo	Women's singles
Bronze medal – third place	2026 Santo Domingo	Women's doubles
Representing Centro Caribe Sports
Central American and Caribbean Games
Silver medal – second place	2023 San Salvador	Women's doubles
Silver medal – second place	2023 San Salvador	Mixed team
Bronze medal – third place	2023 San Salvador	Women's singles

Nikté Alejandra Sotomayor Ovando (born 1 July 1994) is a Guatemalan badminton player. She won bronze medals in the women's singles at the 2019 Pan American Games and in the women's doubles at the 2021 Pan Am Championships. Sotomayor represented her country at the 2020 Tokyo Olympics, becoming the first female badminton player from Guatemala to compete in the Olympics.

== Achievements ==
=== Pan American Games ===
Women's singles
Year	Venue	Opponent	Score	Result
2019	Polideportivo 3 Lima, Peru	(Canada) Rachel Honderich	8–21, 10–21	Bronze

=== Pan Am Championships ===
Women's doubles
Year	Venue	Partner	Opponent	Score	Result
2021	Sagrado Corazon de Jesus; Guatemala City, Guatemala	(Guatemala) Diana Corleto	(Canada) Rachel Honderich (Canada) Kristen Tsai	11–21, 14–21	Bronze

=== Central American and Caribbean Games ===
Women's singles
Year	Venue	Opponent	Score	Result
2014	Omega Complex; Veracruz, Mexico	(Mexico) Haramara Gaitan	15–21, 18–21	Silver
2023	Coliseo Complejo El Polvorín; San Salvador, El Salvador	(Cuba) Taymara Oropesa	19–21, 11–21	Bronze
2026	Pabellón de Tenis de Mesa; Santo Domingo Este, Dominican Republic	(Cuba) Taymara Oropesa	13–21, 13–21	Bronze

Women's doubles
Year	Venue	Partner	Opponent	Score	Result
2014	Omega Complex; Veracruz, Mexico	(Guatemala) Beatriz Ramos	(Mexico) Cynthia González (Mexico) Mariana Ugalde	16–21, 19–21	Bronze
2023	Coliseo Complejo El Polvorín; San Salvador, El Salvador	Diana Corleto	(Mexico) Romina Fregoso (Mexico) Miriam Rodríguez	21–18, 21–23, 16–21	Silver
2026	Pabellón de Tenis de Mesa; Santo Domingo Este, Dominican Republic	(Guatemala) Diana Corleto	(Mexico) Romina Fregoso (Mexico) Miriam Rodríguez	21–16, 18–21, 8–21	Bronze

Mixed doubles
Year	Venue	Partner	Opponent	Score	Result
2010	Raymond Dalmau Coliseum; Mayagüez, Puerto Rico	(Guatemala) Rodolfo Ramírez	(Jamaica) Gareth Henry (Jamaica) Kristal Karjohn	21–18, 9–21, 15–21	Bronze
2014	Omega Complex; Veracruz, Mexico	(Guatemala) Jonathan Solís	(Mexico) Job Castillo (Mexico) Sabrina Solis	15–21, 19–21	Bronze

=== BWF International Challenge/Series (24 titles, 18 runners-up) ===
Women's singles
Year	Tournament	Opponent	Score	Result
2009	Guatemala International	(Spain) Sandra Chirlaque	17–21, 12–21	(silver) Runner-up
2012	Guatemala International	(Guatemala) Ana de León	21–16, 21–18	(gold) Winner
2013	Carebaco International	(Guatemala) Ana de León	21–10, 21–16	(gold) Winner
2016	Colombia International	(Colombia) Laura Sánchez	21–9, 21–8	(gold) Winner
2017	Guatemala Future Series	(Peru) Fernanda Saponara	23–21, 21–18	(gold) Winner
2021	Santo Domingo Open	(Mexico) Sabrina Solís	21–17, 21–18	(gold) Winner
2023	Mexico Future Series	(Mexico) Haramara Gaitán	21–16, 22–20	(gold) Winner
2024	Giraldilla International	(Cuba) Taymara Oropesa	14–21, 21–18, 11–21	(silver) Runner-up
2024	Guatemala Future Series	(France) Romane Cloteaux-Foucault	15–21, 23–25	(silver) Runner-up
2024	Mexican International	(Italy) Gianna Stiglich	19–21, 17–21	(silver) Runner-up
2025	Mexico Future Series	(United States) Ella Lin	13–21, 14–21	(silver) Runner-up
2025	Costa Rica Future Series	(Colombia) Juliana Giraldo	15–21, 16–21	(silver) Runner-up

Women's doubles
Year	Tournament	Partner	Opponent	Score	Result
2012	Guatemala International	(Guatemala) Ana de León	(Guatemala) Melanie Braeuner (Guatemala) Adriana Cojulún	21–11, 21–8	(gold) Winner
2013	Venezuela International	(Guatemala) Ana de León	(Dominican Republic) Daigenis Saturria (Dominican Republic) Berónica Vibieca	24–22, 21–18	(gold) Winner
2013	Guatemala International	(Guatemala) Krisley López	(Dominican Republic) Daigenis Saturria (Dominican Republic) Berónica Vibieca	21–18, 21–19	(gold) Winner
2016	Guatemala International	(Guatemala) Mariana Paiz	(Guatemala) Michele Barrios (Guatemala) Kareen Morales	21–18, 21–14	(gold) Winner
2018	Santo Domingo Open	(Guatemala) Diana Corleto	(Brazil) Lohaynny Vicente (Brazil) Luana Vicente	20–22, 17–21	(silver) Runner-up
2018	Suriname International	(Guatemala) Diana Corleto	(Peru) Daniela Macías (Peru) Dánica Nishimura	10–21, 12–21	(silver) Runner-up
2018	El Salvador International	(Guatemala) Diana Corleto	(Peru) Daniela Macías (Peru) Dánica Nishimura	18–21, 14–21	(silver) Runner-up
2019	Peru Future Series	(Guatemala) Diana Corleto	(Peru) Daniela Macías (Peru) Dánica Nishimura	21–17, 5–21, 14–21	(silver) Runner-up
2019	Peru International	(Guatemala) Diana Corleto	(Brazil) Jaqueline Lima (Brazil) Sâmia Lima	21–15, 21–16	(gold) Winner
2019	Mexico Future Series	(Guatemala) Diana Corleto	(Cuba) Tahimara Oropeza (Cuba) Yeily Ortiz	13–21, 18–21	(silver) Runner-up
2021	Santo Domingo Open	(Guatemala) Diana Corleto	(Guatemala) Alejandra Paiz (Guatemala) Mariana Paiz	21–11, 21–14	(gold) Winner
2021	Peru International	(Guatemala) Diana Corleto	(Guatemala) Alejandra Paiz (Guatemala) Mariana Paiz	24–22, 21–7	(gold) Winner
2021	Guatemala Future Series	(Guatemala) Diana Corleto	(United States) Lauren Lam (United States) Kodi Tang Lee	21–19, 21–13	(gold) Winner
2022	Santo Domingo Open	(Guatemala) Diana Corleto	(Brazil) Sânia Lima (Brazil) Tamires Santos	17–21, 17–21	(silver) Runner-up
2022	Brazil International	(Guatemala) Diana Corleto	(Brazil) Jaqueline Lima (Brazil) Sâmia Lima	16–21, 21–23	(silver) Runner-up
2022	Guatemala International	(Guatemala) Diana Corleto	(Canada) Sharon Au (Canada) Jeslyn Chow	19–21, 14–21	(silver) Runner-up
2023	Guatemala International	(Guatemala) Diana Corleto	(Canada) Jackie Dent (Canada) Crystal Lai	21–18, 17–21, 21–17	(gold) Winner
2024	Guatemala Future Series	(Guatemala) Diana Corleto	(Peru) Fernanda Munar (Peru) Rafaela Munar	21–13, 21–14	(gold) Winner
2024	Perú International Series	(Guatemala) Diana Corleto	(Brazil) Jaqueline Lima (Brazil) Sâmia Lima	11–21, 17–21	(silver) Runner-up
2024	El Salvador International	(Guatemala) Diana Corleto	(Brazil) Jaqueline Lima (Brazil) Sâmia Lima	19–21, 12–21	(silver) Runner-up
2025	Guatemala Future Series	(Guatemala) Diana Corleto	(Dominican Republic) Clarisa Pie (Dominican Republic) Nairoby Abigail Jiménez	21–13, 21–12	(gold) Winner
2026	Perú International Series	(Guatemala) Diana Corleto	(Peru) Fernanda Munar (Peru) Rafaela Munar	21–9, 22–20	(gold) Winner

Mixed doubles
Year	Tournament	Partner	Opponent	Score	Result
2012	Guatemala International	(Guatemala) Aníbal Marroquín	(Guatemala) Jonathan Solís (Guatemala) Ana de León	13–21, 21–14, 21–19	(gold) Winner
2012	Suriname International	(Guatemala) Rubén Castellanos	(Suriname) Mitchel Wongsodikromo (Suriname) Crystal Leefmans	12–21, 18–21	(silver) Runner-up
2013	Venezuela International	(Guatemala) Heymard Humblers	(Dominican Republic) Nelson Javier (Dominican Republic) Berónica Vibieca	21–11, 19–21, 21–19	(gold) Winner
2013	Guatemala International	(Guatemala) Jonathan Solís	(Dominican Republic) Nelson Javier (Dominican Republic) Berónica Vibieca	21–11, 19–21, 21–19	(gold) Winner
2015	Jamaica International	(Guatemala) Jonathan Solís	(Turkey) Ramazan Öztürk (Turkey) Neslihan Kılıç	18–21, 12–21	(silver) Runner-up
2016	Guatemala International	(Guatemala) Jonathan Solís	(United States) Bjorn Seguin (Mexico) Mariana Ugalde	21–8, 21–14	(gold) Winner
2016	Colombia International	(Guatemala) Jonathan Solís	(Colombia) Yamit Gironza (Colombia) Tatiana Muñoz	17–21, 21–14, 21–15	(gold) Winner
2017	Guatemala Future Series	(Guatemala) Jonathan Solís	(El Salvador) Uriel Canjura (El Salvador) Fátima Centeno	21–15, 21–12	(gold) Winner

BWF International Challenge tournament
BWF International Series tournament
BWF Future Series tournament
