= Badminton at the 2018 Central American and Caribbean Games =

- Venue: Coliseo Universidad del Norte
- Location: (Colombia) Barranquilla
- Dates: 28 July – 2 August

The badminton competition at the 2018 Central American and Caribbean Games was held in Barranquilla, Colombia from 28 July to 2 August at the Coliseo Universidad del Norte. It was the sixth appearance for badminton at the Games.

== Medal summary ==
=== Men's events ===
Event	Gold	Silver	Bronze
Singles	Kevin Cordón (GUA)	Osleni Guerrero (CUB)	Leodannis Martínez (CUB) Lino Muñoz (MEX)
Doubles	Jamaica (JAM); Gareth Henry; Samuel Ricketts	Cuba (CUB); Osleni Guerrero; Leodannis Martínez	Dominican Republic (DOM); César Brito; Reimi Cabrera Guatemala (GUA); Aníbal Marroquín; Rodolfo Ramírez

=== Women's events ===
Event	Gold	Silver	Bronze
Singles	Haramara Gaitan (MEX)	Tahimara Oropeza (CUB)	Diana Corleto (GUA) Sabrina Solis (MEX)
Doubles	Cuba (CUB); Tahimara Oropeza; Yeily Ortiz	Mexico (MEX); Haramara Gaitan; Sabrina Solis	Cuba (CUB); Adriana Artiz; Thalía Mengana Mexico (MEX); Mariana Ugalde; Cynthia González

=== Mixed events ===
Event	Gold	Silver	Bronze
Doubles	Cuba (CUB); Osleni Guerrero; Adriana Artiz	Cuba (CUB); Leodannis Martínez; Tahimara Oropeza	Dominican Republic (DOM); Nelson Javier; Nairoby Jiménez Mexico (MEX); Andrés López; Cynthia González
Team	Mexico (MEX); Job Castillo; Haramara Gaitan; Cynthia González; Andrés López; Luis Montoya; Lino Muñoz; Sabrina Solis; Mariana Ugalde	Cuba (CUB); Adriana Artiz; Osleni Guerrero; Ángel Herrera; Leodannis Martínez; Thalía Mengana; Tahimara Oropeza; Yeily Ortiz; Ernesto Reyes	Guatemala (GUA); Rubén Castellanos; Kevin Cordón; Diana Corleto; Aníbal Marroquín; Alejandra Paiz; Mariana Paiz; Rodolfo Ramírez; Nikté Sotomayor

== Medal table ==
Rank	Nation	Gold	Silver	Bronze	Total
1	Cuba (CUB)	2	5	2	9
2	Mexico (MEX)	2	1	4	7
3	Guatemala (GUA)	1	0	3	4
4	Jamaica (JAM)	1	0	0	1
5	Dominican Republic (DOM)	0	0	2	2
Totals (5 entries)		6	6	11	23
