= Andrés López (badminton) =

Mexican badminton player (born 1992)

Personal information
- Born: Andrés López Correa; 9 May 1992 (age 34)
- Height: 1.85 m (6 ft 1 in)
- Weight: 75 kg (165 lb)

Sport
- Country: Mexico
- Sport: Badminton

Men's singles & doubles
- Highest ranking: 169 (MS 8 September 2011); 56 (MD 22 December 2011); 83 (XD 3 May 2012)
- BWF profile
Medal record
Men's badminton
Representing Mexico
Pan American Games
Bronze medal – third place	2011 Guadalajara	Men's doubles
Pan Am Championships
Bronze medal – third place	2012 Lima	Men's doubles
Bronze medal – third place	2018 Guatemala City	Mixed doubles
Bronze medal – third place	2019 Aguascalientes	Men's doubles
Bronze medal – third place	2021 Guatemala City	Mixed doubles
Pan Am Male Cup
Silver medal – second place	2020 Salvador	Men's team
Bronze medal – third place	2022 Acapulco	Men's team
Central American and Caribbean Games
Gold medal – first place	2018 Barranquilla	Mixed team
Silver medal – second place	2010 Mayagüez	Men's doubles
Bronze medal – third place	2010 Mayagüez	Mixed doubles
Bronze medal – third place	2010 Mayagüez	Men's team
Bronze medal – third place	2018 Barranquilla	Mixed doubles
Pan Am Junior Championships
Silver medal – second place	2008 Guatemala City	Mixed team
Bronze medal – third place	2008 Guatemala City	Boys' doubles

Andrés López Correa (born 9 May 1992) is a Mexican badminton player from Mexico City. He was the bronze medalist at the 2011 Pan American Games in the men's doubles event partnered with Lino Muñoz. López also part of the national team that clinched the gold medal at the 2018 Central American and Caribbean Games in Barranquilla, Colombia.

== Achievements ==
=== Pan American Games ===
Men's doubles
Year	Venue	Partner	Opponent	Score	Result
2011	Multipurpose Gymnasium; Guadalajara, Mexico	(Mexico) Lino Muñoz	(United States) Howard Bach (United States) Tony Gunawan	12–21, 12–21	Bronze

=== Pan Am Championships ===
Men's doubles
Year	Venue	Partner	Opponent	Score	Result
2012	Manuel Bonilla Stadium; Lima, Peru	(Mexico) Lino Muñoz	(Brazil) Daniel Paiola (Brazil) Alex Yuwan Tjong	12–21, 21–16, 17–21	Bronze
2019	Gimnasio Olímpico; Aguascalientes, Mexico	(Mexico) Luis Montoya	(Cuba) Osleni Guerrero (Cuba) Leodannis Martínez	23–25, 19–21	Bronze

Mixed doubles
Year	Venue	Partner	Opponent	Score	Result
2018	Teodoro Palacios Flores Gymnasium; Guatemala City, Guatemala	(Mexico) Cynthia González	(Canada) Nyl Yakura (Canada) Kristen Tsai	11–21, 17–21	Bronze
2021	Sagrado Corazon de Jesus; Guatemala City, Guatemala	(Mexico) Sabrina Solis	(Guatemala) Christopher Martínez (Guatemala) Mariana Paiz	20–22, 19–21	Bronze

=== Central American and Caribbean Games ===
Men's doubles
Year	Venue	Partner	Opponent	Score	Result
2010	Raymond Dalmau Coliseum; Mayagüez, Puerto Rico	(Mexico) Lino Muñoz	(Guatemala) Kevin Cordón (Guatemala) Rodolfo Ramírez	21–18, 17–21, 6–21	Silver

Mixed doubles
Year	Venue	Partner	Opponent	Score	Result
2010	Raymond Dalmau Coliseum; Mayagüez, Puerto Rico	(Mexico) Victoria Montero	(Jamaica) Garron Palmer (Jamaica) Alya Lewis	11–21, 21–15, 14–21	Bronze
2018	Coliseo Universidad del Norte; Barranquilla, Colombia	(Mexico) Cynthia González	(Cuba) Osleni Guerrero (Cuba) Adriana Artiz	15–21, 15–21	Bronze

=== BWF International Challenge/Series (6 titles, 3 runners-up) ===
Men's doubles
Year	Tournament	Partner	Opponent	Score	Result
2009	Mexican International	(Mexico) José Luis Gonzalez	(United States) Mathew Fogarty (United States) David Neumann	21–18, 16–21, 21–14	(gold) Winner
2010	Internacional Mexicano	(Mexico) Lino Muñoz	(Mexico) Mauricio Casillas (Mexico) José Luis Gonzalez	28–26, 14–21, 21–14	(gold) Winner
2011	Internacional Mexicano	(Mexico) Lino Muñoz	(Brazil) Luis Henrique dos Santos Jr. (Brazil) Alex Yuwan Tjong	15–21, 21–14, 21–18	(gold) Winner
2018	International Mexicano	(Mexico) Luis Montoya	(Brazil) Fabrício Farias (Brazil) Francielton Farias	15–21, 22–24	(silver) Runner-up
2019	Mexico Future Series	(Mexico) Luis Montoya	(Cuba) Osleni Guerrero (Cuba) Leodannis Martínez	13–21, 19–21	(silver) Runner-up
2019	International Mexicano	(Mexico) Lino Muñoz	(Guatemala) Aníbal Marroquín (Guatemala) Jonathan Solís	16–21, 13–21	(silver) Runner-up

Mixed doubles
Year	Tournament	Partner	Opponent	Score	Result
2010	Internacional Mexicano	(Mexico) Victoria Montero	(United States) Bjorn Seguin (Mexico) Deyanira Angulo	21–15, 21–18	(gold) Winner
2011	Internacional Mexicano	(Mexico) Victoria Montero	(Mexico) Lino Muñoz (Mexico) Cynthia González	21–19, 20–22, 21–14	(gold) Winner
2020	Internacional Mexicano	(Mexico) Sabrina Solis	(Mexico) Job Castillo (Mexico) Vanessa Villalobos	21–15, 18–21, 21–19	(gold) Winner

BWF International Challenge tournament
BWF International Series tournament
BWF Future Series tournament
