= Leodannis Martínez =

Cuban badminton player (born 1995)

Personal information
- Born: Leodannis Martínez Palacio; 29 April 1995 (age 31) Santiago de Cuba, Cuba
- Height: 1.76 m (5 ft 9 in)
- Weight: 68 kg (150 lb)

Sport
- Country: Cuba
- Sport: Badminton

Men's singles & doubles
- Highest ranking: 114 (MS 22 March 2018); 65 (MD 13 August 2019); 64 (XD 5 July 2018)
- BWF profile
Medal record
Men's badminton
Representing Cuba
Pan American Games
Bronze medal – third place	2019 Lima	Men's doubles
Pan Am Championships
Silver medal – second place	2019 Aguascalientes	Men's doubles
Bronze medal – third place	2017 Havana	Men's singles
Central American and Caribbean Games
Silver medal – second place	2018 Barranquilla	Men's doubles
Silver medal – second place	2018 Barranquilla	Mixed doubles
Silver medal – second place	2018 Barranquilla	Mixed team
Bronze medal – third place	2014 Veracruz	Men's doubles
Bronze medal – third place	2014 Veracruz	Mixed team
Bronze medal – third place	2018 Barranquilla	Men's singles

Leodannis Martínez Palacio (Note: In this Spanish name, the first or paternal surname is Martínez and the second or maternal family name is Palacio.) (born 29 April 1995) is a Cuban badminton player. In 2014, Martínez placed third at the 2014 Central American and Caribbean Games in the men's doubles and mixed team event. In 2015, he competed at the Pan Am Games in Toronto, Canada. In 2016, he won the Giraldilla International tournament in the men's doubles event partnered with Ernesto Reyes. He claimed 4 medals at the 2018 Central American and Caribbean Games in Barranquilla, Colombia.

== Achievements ==
=== Pan American Games ===
Men's doubles
Year	Venue	Partner	Opponent	Score	Result
2019	Polideportivo 3 Lima, Peru	(Cuba) Osleni Guerrero	(Canada) Jason Ho-Shue (Canada) Nyl Yakura	21–23, 15–21	Bronze

=== Pan Am Championships ===
Men's singles
Year	Venue	Opponent	Score	Result
2017	Sports City Coliseum; Havana, Cuba	(Brazil) Ygor Coelho	6–21, 18–21	Bronze

Men's doubles
Year	Venue	Partner	Opponent	Score	Result
2019	Gimnasio Olímpico; Aguascalientes, Mexico	(Cuba) Osleni Guerrero	(Canada) Jason Ho-Shue (Canada) Nyl Yakura	11–21, 22–20, 10–21	Silver

=== Central American and Caribbean Games ===
Men's singles
Year	Venue	Opponent	Score	Result
2018	Coliseo Universidad del Norte; Barranquilla, Colombia	(Guatemala) Kevin Cordón	13–21, 17–21	Bronze

Men's doubles
Year	Venue	Partner	Opponent	Score	Result
2014	Omega Complex; Veracruz, Mexico	(Cuba) Ernesto Reyes	(Guatemala) Rodolfo Ramírez (Guatemala) Jonathan Solís	17–21, 11–21	Bronze
2018	Coliseo Universidad del Norte; Barranquilla, Colombia	(Cuba) Osleni Guerrero	(Jamaica) Gareth Henry (Jamaica) Samuel Ricketts	12–21, 21–11, 19–21	Silver

Mixed doubles
Year	Venue	Partner	Opponent	Score	Result
2018	Coliseo Universidad del Norte; Barranquilla, Colombia	(Cuba) Taymara Oropesa	(Cuba) Osleni Guerrero (Cuba) Adriana Artiz	21–18, 17–21, 19–21	Silver

=== BWF International Challenge/Series (11 titles, 12 runners-up) ===
Men's singles
Year	Tournament	Opponent	Score	Result
2017	Guatemala International	(Guatemala) Kevin Cordón	17–21, 18–21	(silver) Runner-up
2018	Giraldilla International	(Canada) Xiaodong Sheng	17–21, 13–21	(silver) Runner-up

Men's doubles
Year	Tournament	Partner	Opponent	Score	Result
2013	Venezuela International	(Cuba) Ernesto Reyes	(Guatemala) Heymard Humblers (Guatemala) Aníbal Marroquín	17–21, 14–21	(silver) Runner-up
2016	Giraldilla International	(Cuba) Ernesto Reyes	(Cuba) Ángel Herrera (Cuba) Lázaro Madera	21–12, 21–12	(gold) Winner
2017	Giraldilla International	(Cuba) Osleni Guerrero	(Italy) Lukas Osele (Italy) Kevin Strobl	21–11, 22–24, 21–8	(gold) Winner
2017	Santo Domingo Open	(Cuba) Osleni Guerrero	(Dominican Republic) Therry Aquino (Dominican Republic) Reimi Cabrera	21–12, 21–14	(gold) Winner
2018	Giraldilla International	(Cuba) Osleni Guerrero	(Cuba) Lazaro Madera (Cuba) Ernesto Reyes	21–10, 21–16	(gold) Winner
2018	Guatemala International	(Cuba) Osleni Guerrero	(Guatemala) Rubén Castellanos (Guatemala) Aníbal Marroquín	12–21, 17–21	(silver) Runner-up
2019	Giraldilla International	(Cuba) Ángel Herrera	(Peru) José Guevara (Peru) Daniel la Torre	26–28, 18–21	(silver) Runner-up
2019	Peru Future Series	(Cuba) Osleni Guerrero	(Peru) Mario Cuba (Peru) Diego Mini	21–14, 21–17	(gold) Winner
2019	Mexico Future Series	(Cuba) Osleni Guerrero	(Mexico) Andrés López (Mexico) Luis Montoya	21–13, 21–19	(gold) Winner
2019	Santo Domingo Open	(Cuba) Osleni Guerrero	(Brazil) Fabrício Farias (Brazil) Francielton Farias	21–19, 21–16	(gold) Winner
2022	Santo Domingo Open	(Cuba) Osleni Guerrero	(Japan) Ayato Endo (Japan) Yuta Takei	13–21, 9–21	(silver) Runner-up

Mixed doubles
Year	Tournament	Partner	Opponent	Score	Result
2012	Giraldilla International	(Cuba) Grettel Labrada Casas	(Venezuela) Luis Camacho (Venezuela) Johanny Quintero	18–21, 21–14, 13–21	(silver) Runner-up
2017	Giraldilla International	(Cuba) Taymara Oropesa	(Guatemala) Jonathan Solís (Guatemala) Mariana Paiz	21–2, 21–13	(gold) Winner
2017	Internacional Mexicano	(Cuba) Taymara Oropesa	(Peru) Daniel la Torre (Peru) Dánica Nishimura	19–21, 19–21	(silver) Runner-up
2017	Guatemala International	(Cuba) Taymara Oropesa	(Guatemala) Christopher Martínez (Guatemala) Diana Corleto	17–21, 21–13, 21–11	(gold) Winner
2017	Santo Domingo Open	(Cuba) Taymara Oropesa	(Cuba) Osleni Guerrero (Cuba) Adriana Artiz	21–11, 13–21, 21–15	(gold) Winner
2017	Suriname International	(Cuba) Taymara Oropesa	(Jamaica) Dennis Coke (Jamaica) Katherine Wynter	21–16, 21–18	(gold) Winner
2018	Jamaica International	(Cuba) Taymara Oropesa	(Cuba) Osleni Guerrero (Cuba) Yeily Ortiz	20–22, 15–21	(silver) Runner-up
2018	Giraldilla International	(Cuba) Taymara Oropesa	(Cuba) Osleni Guerrero (Cuba) Adriana Artiz	13–21, 21–13, 19–21	(silver) Runner-up
2018	Peru International	(Cuba) Taymara Oropesa	(Brazil) Artur Pomoceno (Brazil) Fabiana Silva	24–26, 21–15, 8–21	(silver) Runner-up
2018	Guatemala International	(Cuba) Taymara Oropesa	(Canada) Joshua Hurlburt-Yu (Canada) Josephine Wu	12–21, 18–21	(silver) Runner-up

BWF International Challenge tournament
BWF International Series tournament
BWF Future Series tournament
