= Badminton at the 2014 Central American and Caribbean Games =

Tournament details
- Dates: 23–28 November
- Edition: 5
- Venue: Omega Complex
- Location: Veracruz, Mexico

The Badminton competition at the 2014 Central American and Caribbean Games was held in Veracruz, Mexico. The tournament was scheduled to be held from 23–28 November at the Omega Complex. It was the fifth appearance for badminton at the Games.

== Medal summary ==
=== Men's events ===
Event	Gold	Silver	Bronze
Singles	Kevin Cordón (GUA)	Osleni Guerrero (CUB)	Rodolfo Ramírez (GUA); Lino Muñoz (MEX)
Doubles	Guatemala (GUA); Kevin Cordón; Aníbal Marroquín	Guatemala (GUA); Rodolfo Ramírez; Jonathan Solís	Cuba (CUB); Leodannis Martínez; Ernesto Reyes; Mexico (MEX); Job Castillo; Antonio Ocegueda

=== Women's events ===
Event	Gold	Silver	Bronze
Singles	Haramara Gaitán (MEX)	Nikté Sotomayor (GUA)	Mariana Ugalde (MEX); Berónica Vibieca (DOM)
Doubles	Mexico (MEX); Haramara Gaitán; Sabrina Solis	Mexico (MEX); Cynthia González; Mariana Ugalde	Guatemala (GUA); Beatriz Ramos; Nikté Sotomayor; Cuba (CUB); Adriana Artiz; Taymara Oropesa

=== Mixed events ===
Event	Gold	Silver	Bronze
Doubles	Cuba (CUB); Osleni Guerrero; Taymara Oropesa	Mexico (MEX); Job Castillo; Sabrina Solis	Guatemala (GUA); Jonathan Solís; Nikté Sotomayor; Guatemala (GUA); Aníbal Marroquín; Beatriz Ramos
Team	Guatemala (GUA); Jonathan Solís; Nikté Sotomayor; Beatriz Ramos; Aníbal Marroquín; Maria del Valle; Ana Lucia de León; Rodolfo Ramírez; Kevin Cordón	Mexico (MEX); Lino Muñoz; Haramara Gaitán; Job Castillo; Antonio Ocegueda; Arturo Hernández; Cynthia González; Mariana Ugalde; Sabrina Solis	Cuba (CUB); Osleni Guerrero; Leodannis Martínez; Ernesto Reyes; Taymara Oropesa; Adriana Artiz

== Medal table ==
* Host nation (Mexico)

Rank	Nation	Gold	Silver	Bronze	Total
1	Guatemala	3	2	4	9
2	Mexico*	2	3	3	8
3	Cuba	1	1	3	5
4	Dominican Republic	0	0	1	1
Totals (4 entries)		6	6	11	23
