= Joshua Hurlburt-Yu =

Canadian badminton player (born 1994)

Joshua Hurlburt-Yu 余智华
Personal information
- Born: 28 December 1994 (age 31) Toronto, Ontario, Canada
- Height: 1.94 m (6 ft 4 in)
- Weight: 86 kg (190 lb)

Sport
- Country: Canada
- Sport: Badminton

Men's & mixed doubles
- Highest ranking: 64 (MD with Duncan Yao 13 August 2019); 26 (XD with Josephine Wu, 3 August 2021)
- Current ranking: 122 (MD with Jason Ho-Shue); 333 (XD with Josephine Wu) (22 November 2022)
- BWF profile
Medal record
Men's badminton
Representing Canada
Pan American Games
Gold medal – first place	2019 Lima	Mixed doubles
Pan Am Championships
Gold medal – first place	2019 Aguascalientes	Mixed doubles
Gold medal – first place	2021 Guatemala City	Mixed doubles
Gold medal – first place	2023 Kingston	Mixed doubles
Pan Am Mixed Team Championships
Gold medal – first place	2019 Lima	Mixed team
Pan Am Men's Team Championships
Gold medal – first place	2020 Salvador	Men's team
Pan Am Junior Championships
Silver medal – second place	2012 Edmonton	Mixed doubles

Joshua Hurlburt-Yu (born 28 December 1994) is a Canadian badminton player. Joshua was a gold medalist in the mixed doubles event at the 2019 Lima Pan American Games, and also at the 2019 and 2021 Pan Am Championships.

== Career ==
In June 2021, Hurlburt-Yu was named to Canada's Olympic team, competing in the mixed doubles badminton event.

== Achievements ==
=== Pan American Games ===
Mixed doubles
Year	Venue	Partner	Opponent	Score	Result
2019	Polideportivo 3 Lima, Peru	(Canada) Josephine Wu	(Canada) Nyl Yakura (Canada) Kristen Tsai	18–21, 21–12, 21–15	Gold

=== Pan Am Championships ===
Mixed doubles
Year	Venue	Partner	Opponent	Score	Result
2019	Gimnasio Olímpico; Aguascalientes, Mexico	(Canada) Josephine Wu	(Brazil) Fabricio Farias (Brazil) Jaqueline Lima	21–14, 21–19	Gold
2021	Sagrado Corazon de Jesus; Guatemala City, Guatemala	(Canada) Josephine Wu	(Guatemala) Christopher Martínez (Guatemala) Mariana Paiz	21–18, 21–18	Gold
2023	G.C. Foster College of Physical Education and Sport; Kingston, Jamaica	(Canada) Rachel Honderich	(Canada) Ty Alexander Lindeman (Canada) Josephine Wu	22–20, 18–21, 21–17	Gold

=== Pan Am Junior Championships ===
Mixed doubles
Year	Venue	Partner	Opponent	Score	Result
2012	Edmonton, Canada	(Canada) Brittney Tam	(United States) Phillip Chew (United States) Iris Wang	24–22, 17–21, 22–24	Silver

=== BWF International Challenge/Series (9 titles, 2 runners-up) ===
Men's doubles
Year	Venue	Partner	Opponent	Score	Result
2018	Yonex / K&D Graphics International	(Canada) Duncan Yao	(United States) Sattawat Pongnairat (Indonesia) Ferdinand Sinarta Surbakti	18–21, 21–16, 21–18	(gold) Winner
2018	Santo Domingo Open	(Canada) Duncan Yao	(Guatemala) Rodolfo Ramírez (Guatemala) Jonathan Solís	21–19, 16–21, 21–17	(gold) Winner
2019	Hungarian International	(Canada) Peter Briggs	(South Korea) Kim Duk-young (South Korea) Kim Sa-rang	12–21, 17–21	(silver) Runner-up
2022	Peru Challenge	(Canada) Jason Ho-Shue	(Canada) Adam Dong (Canada) Nyl Yakura	21–15, 18–21, 21–12	(gold) Winner

Mixed doubles
Year	Venue	Partner	Opponent	Score	Result
2018	Yonex / K&D Graphics International	(Canada) Josephine Wu	(United States) Sattawat Pongnairat (United States) Kerry Xu	21–16, 21–13	(gold) Winner
2018	Guatemala International	(Canada) Josephine Wu	(Cuba) Leodannis Martínez (Cuba) Tahimara Oropeza	21–12, 21–18	(gold) Winner
2018	Santo Domingo Open	(Canada) Josephine Wu	(Brazil) Fabricio Farias (Brazil) Jaqueline Lima	21–17, 16–21, 22–20	(gold) Winner
2019	Bulgarian Open	(Canada) Josephine Wu	(England) Matthew Clare (England) Lizzie Tolman	21–16, 21–16	(gold) Winner
2019	South Australia International	(Canada) Josephine Wu	(Indonesia) Dejan Ferdinansyah (Indonesia) Serena Kani	21–19, 25–27, 21–16	(gold) Winner
2019	Yonex / K&D Graphics International	(Canada) Josephine Wu	(Chinese Taipei) Lu Chia-pin (Chinese Taipei) Lin Wan-ching	21–18, 21–18	(gold) Winner
2023	Portugal International	(Canada) Rachel Honderich	(Denmark) Andreas Søndergaard (Denmark) Iben Bergstein	19–21, 20–22	(silver) Runner-up

BWF International Challenge tournament
BWF International Series tournament
