= Ernesto Reyes (badminton) =

Cuban badminton player (born 1992)

Personal information
- Born: Ernesto Reyes Milian; 10 September 1992 (age 34)
- Height: 1.83 m (6 ft 0 in)
- Weight: 82 kg (181 lb)

Sport
- Country: Cuba
- Sport: Badminton

Men's singles & doubles
- Highest ranking: 330 (MS 21 June 2018); 182 (MD 19 June 2014); 193 (XD 30 June 2016)
- BWF profile
Medal record
Men's badminton
Representing Cuba
Central American and Caribbean Games
Silver medal – second place	2018 Barranquilla	Mixed team
Bronze medal – third place	2014 Veracruz	Men's doubles
Bronze medal – third place	2014 Veracruz	Mixed team

Ernesto Reyes Milian (born 10 September 1992) is a Cuban badminton player. He competed at the 2015 Pan American Games. Reyes was the bronze medalists at the 2014 Central American and Caribbean Games in the men's doubles and team event. He won the Giraldilla International tournament in the men's doubles event partnered with Ronald Toledo in 2012, and with Leodannis Martínez in 2016. He competed at the 2018 Central American and Caribbean Games in Barranquilla, Colombia, and helped the team win the silver medal.

== Achievements ==
=== Central American and Caribbean Games ===
Men's doubles
Year	Venue	Partner	Opponent	Score	Result
2014	Omega Complex; Veracruz, Mexico	(Cuba) Leodannis Martínez	(Guatemala) Rodolfo Ramírez (Guatemala) Jonathan Solís	17–21, 11–21	Bronze

=== BWF International Challenge/Series ===
Men's doubles
Year	Tournament	Partner	Opponent	Score	Result
2018	Giraldilla International	(Cuba) Lazaro Yovani Madera Padrino	(Cuba) Osleni Guerrero (Cuba) Leodannis Martínez	10–21, 16–21	(silver) Runner-up
2016	Giraldilla International	(Cuba) Leodannis Martínez	(Cuba) Ángel Herrera (Cuba) Lazaro Yovani Madera Padrino	21–12, 21–12	(gold) Winner
2013	Venezuela International	(Cuba) Leodannis Martínez	(Guatemala) Humblers Heymard (Guatemala) Anibal Marroquin	17–21, 14–21	(silver) Runner-up
2012	Giraldilla International	(Cuba) Ronald Toledo	(Dominican Republic) William Cabrera (Dominican Republic) Freddy Lopez	21–16, 23–21	(gold) Winner

BWF International Challenge tournament
BWF International Series tournament
BWF Future Series tournament
