= Mariana Ugalde =

Mexican badminton player (born 1993)

Personal information
- Born: Mariana Ugalde Campo; 7 January 1993 (age 33)
- Height: 1.64 m (5 ft 5 in)
- Weight: 60 kg (132 lb)

Sport
- Country: Mexico
- Sport: Badminton

Women's singles & doubles
- Highest ranking: 93 (WS 27 November 2014); 67 (WD 28 May 2015); 71 (XD 22 September 2016)
- BWF profile
Medal record
Women's badminton
Representing Mexico
Pan Am Championships
Bronze medal – third place	2017 Havana	Women's singles
Central American and Caribbean Games
Gold medal – first place	2010 Mayagüez	Women's team
Gold medal – first place	2018 Barranquilla	Mixed team
Silver medal – second place	2014 Veracruz	Women's doubles
Silver medal – second place	2014 Veracruz	Mixed team
Bronze medal – third place	2010 Mayagüez	Women's singles
Bronze medal – third place	2010 Mayagüez	Women's doubles
Bronze medal – third place	2014 Veracruz	Women's singles
Bronze medal – third place	2018 Barranquilla	Women's doubles

Mariana Ugalde Campo (born 7 January 1993) is a Mexican badminton player. She competed at the 2010 Summer Youth Olympics. Ugalde was part of Mexican winning team at the 2010 and 2018 Central American and Caribbean Games, and also a runner-up in 2014. In the individual event, she has collected a silver and two bronze medals in the women's doubles and another two bronze medals in the women's singles during her participation at the Central American and Caribbean Games from 2010 to 2018.

== Achievements ==
=== Pan Am Championships ===
Women's singles
Year	Venue	Opponent	Score	Result
2017	Sports City Coliseum; Havana, Cuba	(Canada) Rachel Honderich	14–21, 10–21	Bronze

=== Central American and Caribbean Games ===
Women's singles
Year	Venue	Opponent	Score	Result
2010	Raymond Dalmau Coliseum; Mayagüez, Puerto Rico	(Mexico) Cynthia González	17–21, 23–21, 15–21	Bronze
2014	Omega Complex; Veracruz, Mexico	(Guatemala) Nikté Sotomayor	17–21, 19–21	Bronze

Women's doubles
Year	Venue	Partner	Opponent	Score	Result
2010	Raymond Dalmau Coliseum; Mayagüez, Puerto Rico	(Mexico) Haramara Gaitan	(Puerto Rico) Jaylene Forrester (Puerto Rico) Keara Gonzalez	19–21, 18–21	Bronze
2014	Omega Complex; Veracruz, Mexico	(Mexico) Cynthia González	(Mexico) Haramara Gaitan (Mexico) Sabrina Solis	15–21, 17–21	Silver
2018	Coliseo Universidad del Norte; Barranquilla, Colombia	(Mexico) Cynthia González	(Cuba) Yeily Ortiz (Cuba) Tahimara Oropeza	15–21, 21–13, 12–21	Bronze

=== BWF International Challenge/Series ===
Women's singles
Year	Tournament	Opponent	Score	Result
2010	Internacional Mexicano	(Mexico) Victoria Montero	21–19, 7–21, 18–21	(silver) Runner-up
2016	Internacional Mexicano	(Mexico) Haramara Gaitan	21–15, 10–21, 17–21	(silver) Runner-up
2017	Giraldilla International	(Hungary) Laura Sárosi	19–21, 15–21	(silver) Runner-up
2019	Mexico Future Series	(Cuba) Tahimara Oropeza	9–21, 18–21	(silver) Runner-up

Women's doubles
Year	Tournament	Partner	Opponent	Score	Result
2014	Internacional Mexicano	(Mexico) Cynthia González	(Mexico) Haramara Gaitan (Mexico) Sabrina Solis	21–17, 11–21, 22–20	(gold) Winner
2015	Trinidad and Tobago International	(Mexico) Cynthia González	(Mexico) Haramara Gaitan (Mexico) Sabrina Solis	21–19, 21–23, 21–23	(silver) Runner-up
2015	Internacional Mexicano	(Mexico) Cynthia González	(Brazil) Lohaynny Vicente (Brazil) Luana Vicente	8–21, 17–21	(silver) Runner-up
2016	Internacional Mexicano	(Mexico) Cynthia González	(Mexico) Natalia Leyva (Mexico) Vanessa Villalobos	21–16, 21–11	(gold) Winner
2017	Giraldilla International	(Hungary) Laura Sárosi	(Italy) Silvia Garino (Italy) Lisa Iversen	21–15, 21–17	(gold) Winner

Mixed doubles
Year	Tournament	Partner	Opponent	Score	Result
2016	Guatemala International	(United States) Bjorn Seguin	(Guatemala) Jonathan Solís (Guatemala) Nikté Sotomayor	8–21, 14–21	(silver) Runner-up
2016	Jamaica International	(United States) Bjorn Seguin	(Austria) David Obernosterer (Austria) Elisabeth Baldauf	19–21, 21–18, 11–21	(silver) Runner-up
2016	Giraldilla International	(United States) Bjorn Seguin	(Austria) David Obernosterer (Austria) Elisabeth Baldauf	12–21, 12–21	(silver) Runner-up
2016	Internacional Mexicano	(Mexico) Arturo Hernández	(Austria) Vilson Vattanirappel (Mexico) Cynthia González	21–15, 11–21, 14–21	(silver) Runner-up

BWF International Challenge tournament
BWF International Series tournament
BWF Future Series tournament
