= Sabrina Solís =

Mexican badminton player (born 1996)

Sabrina Solis
Personal information
- Born: Sabrina Solis Martinez; 30 August 1996 (age 30)
- Height: 1.60 m (5 ft 3 in)
- Weight: 54 kg (119 lb)

Sport
- Country: Mexico
- Sport: Badminton

Women's singles & doubles
- Highest ranking: 109 (WS 21 April 2016); 61 (WD with Haramara Gaitán 12 May 2016); 119 (XD with Andrés López 4 May 2021)
- BWF profile
Medal record
Women's badminton
Representing Mexico
Pan Am Championships
Bronze medal – third place	2019 Aguascalientes	Women's doubles
Bronze medal – third place	2021 Guatemala City	Mixed doubles
Bronze medal – third place	2023 Kingston	Women's doubles
Central American and Caribbean Games
Gold medal – first place	2014 Veracruz	Women's doubles
Gold medal – first place	2018 Barranquilla	Mixed team
Gold medal – first place	2023 San Salvador	Mixed team
Silver medal – second place	2014 Veracruz	Mixed doubles
Silver medal – second place	2014 Veracruz	Mixed team
Silver medal – second place	2018 Barranquilla	Women's doubles
Bronze medal – third place	2018 Barranquilla	Women's singles

Sabrina Solis Martinez (born 30 August 1996) is a Mexican badminton player.

== Achievements ==
=== Pan American Championships ===
Women's doubles
Year	Venue	Partner	Opponent	Score	Result
2019	Gimnasio Olímpico; Aguascalientes, Mexico	(Mexico) Vanessa Villalobos	(Canada) Catherine Choi (Canada) Josephine Wu	9–21, 15–21	Bronze
2023	G.C. Foster College of Physical Education and Sport; Kingston, Jamaica	(Mexico) Haramara Gaitán	(United States) Francesca Corbett (United States) Allison Lee	5–21, 8–21	Bronze

Mixed doubles
Year	Venue	Partner	Opponent	Score	Result
2021	Sagrado Corazon de Jesus; Guatemala City, Guatemala	(Mexico) Andrés López	(Guatemala) Christopher Martínez (Guatemala) Mariana Paiz	20–22, 19–21	Bronze

=== Central American and Caribbean Games ===
Women's singles
Year	Venue	Opponent	Score	Result
2018	Coliseo Universidad del Norte; Barranquilla, Colombia	(Cuba) Taymara Oropesa	9–21, 21–23	Bronze

Women's doubles
Year	Venue	Partner	Opponent	Score	Result
2014	Omega Complex; Veracruz, Mexico	(Mexico) Haramara Gaitán	(Mexico) Cynthia González (Mexico) Mariana Ugalde	21–15, 21–17	Gold
2018	Coliseo Universidad del Norte; Barranquilla, Colombia	(Mexico) Haramara Gaitán	(Cuba) Taymara Oropesa (Cuba) Yeily Ortiz	15–21, 23–21, 17–21	Silver

Mixed doubles
Year	Venue	Partner	Opponent	Score	Result
2014	Omega Complex; Veracruz, Mexico	(Mexico) Job Castillo	(Cuba) Osleni Guerrero (Cuba) Taymara Oropesa	21–16, 14–21, 13–21	Silver

=== BWF International Challenge/Series (9 titles, 9 runners-up) ===
Women's singles
Year	Tournament	Opponent	Score	Result
2018	Dominican Open	(Dominican Republic) Nairoby Jiménez	21–5, 21–15	(gold) Winner
2020	Internacional Mexicano	(Peru) Inés Castillo	22–20, 21–8	(gold) Winner
2021	Santo Domingo Open	(Guatemala) Nikté Sotomayor	17–21, 18–21	(silver) Runner-up
2023	Suriname International	(Mexico) Haramara Gaitán	21–18, 9–21, 17–21	(silver) Runner-up
2024	Suriname International	(Peru) Inés Castillo	15–21, 16–21	(silver) Runner-up
2025	Bolivia International	(Peru) Naomi Junco	21–17, 15–21, 21–16	(gold) Winner
2025	Venezuela International	(Peru) Inés Castillo	10–21, 13–21	(silver) Runner-up

Women's doubles
Year	Tournament	Partner	Opponent	Score	Result
2014	Internacional Mexicano	(Mexico) Haramara Gaitán	(Mexico) Cynthia González (Mexico) Mariana Ugalde	17–21, 21–11, 20-22	(silver) Runner-up
2015	Trinidad and Tobago International	(Mexico) Haramara Gaitán	(Mexico) Cynthia González (Mexico) Mariana Ugalde	19–21, 23–21, 23–21	(gold) Winner
2015	Colombia International	(Mexico) Haramara Gaitán	(Brazil) Ana Paula Campos (Brazil) Fabiana Silva	18–21, 17-21	(silver) Runner-up
2015	Argentina International	(Mexico) Haramara Gaitán	(Argentina) Florencia Bernatene (Argentina) Daiana Garmendia	21–7, 21–6	(gold) Winner
2015	Puerto Rico International	(Mexico) Haramara Gaitán	(Brazil) Ana Paula Campos (Brazil) Fabiana Silva	21–12, 21–15	(gold) Winner
2015	Suriname International	(Mexico) Haramara Gaitán	(Brazil) Ana Paula Campos (Brazil) Fabiana Silva	No match	(gold) Winner
2023	Brazil International	(Mexico) Haramara Gaitán	(Brazil) Jaqueline Lima (Brazil) Sâmia Lima	11–21, 13–21	(silver) Runner-up
2023	Venezuela International	(Mexico) Haramara Gaitán	(Mexico) Romina Fregoso (Mexico) Miriam Rodríguez	Walkover	(silver) Runner-up
2023	Suriname International	(Mexico) Haramara Gaitán	(Trinidad and Tobago) Amara Urquhart (Suriname) Chan Yang	21–7, 21–11	(gold) Winner

Mixed doubles
Year	Tournament	Partner	Opponent	Score	Result
2014	Internacional Mexicano	(Mexico) Job Castillo	(Mexico) Lino Muñoz (Mexico) Cynthia González	21–16, 16–21, 13-21	(silver) Runner-up
2020	Internacional Mexicano	(Mexico) Andrés López	(Mexico) Job Castillo (Mexico) Vanessa Villalobos	21–15, 18–21, 21–19	(gold) Winner

BWF International Challenge tournament
BWF International Series tournament
BWF Future Series tournament
