= Haramara Gaitán =

Mexican badminton player (born 1996)

Personal information
- Born: Haramara Gaitán Fausto; 7 August 1996 (age 30) Guadalajara, Mexico
- Height: 1.63 m (5 ft 4 in)
- Weight: 50 kg (110 lb)

Sport
- Country: Mexico
- Sport: Badminton

Women's singles & doubles
- Highest ranking: 62 (WS 31 January 2023); 61 (WD 12 May 2016); 196 (XD 17 April 2014)
- Current ranking: 94 (WS 31 October 2023)
- BWF profile
Medal record
Women's badminton
Representing Mexico
Pan Am Championships
Bronze medal – third place	2018 Guatemala City	Women's singles
Bronze medal – third place	2023 Kingston	Women's doubles
Central American and Caribbean Games
Gold medal – first place	2010 Mayagüez	Women's team
Gold medal – first place	2014 Veracruz	Women's singles
Gold medal – first place	2014 Veracruz	Women's doubles
Gold medal – first place	2018 Barranquilla	Women's singles
Gold medal – first place	2018 Barranquilla	Mixed team
Gold medal – first place	2023 San Salvador	Women's singles
Gold medal – first place	2023 San Salvador	Mixed team
Silver medal – second place	2014 Veracruz	Mixed team
Silver medal – second place	2018 Barranquilla	Women's doubles
Bronze medal – third place	2010 Mayagüez	Women's singles
Bronze medal – third place	2010 Mayagüez	Women's doubles

Haramara Gaitán Fausto (born 7 August 1996) is a Mexican badminton player. She is three-times women's singles gold medalists at the Central American and Caribbean Games, winning the title in 2014, 2018 and 2023. She also won the women's doubles title in 2014, and clinched the team title in 2010 and 2023. In the Pan Am Championships, Gaitán won the bronze medals in the women's singles in 2018 and in the women's doubles in 2023. She competed at the 2015, 2019 Pan American Games, and 2020 Summer Olympics.

== Achievements ==
=== Pan Am Championships ===
Women's singles
Year	Venue	Opponent	Score	Result
2018	Teodoro Palacios Flores Gymnasium; Guatemala City, Guatemala	(Canada) Rachel Honderich	7–21, 10–21	Bronze

Women's doubles
Year	Venue	Partner	Opponent	Score	Result
2023	G.C. Foster College of Physical Education and Sport; Kingston, Jamaica	(Mexico) Sabrina Solis	(United States) Francesca Corbett (United States) Allison Lee	5–21, 8–21	Bronze

=== Central American and Caribbean Games ===
Women's singles
Year	Venue	Opponent	Score	Result
2010	Raymond Dalmau Coliseum; Mayagüez, Puerto Rico	(Mexico) Victoria Montero	19–21, 17–21	Bronze
2014	Omega Complex; Veracruz, Mexico	(Guatemala) Nikté Sotomayor	21–15, 21–18	Gold
2018	Coliseo Universidad del Norte; Barranquilla, Colombia	(Cuba) Taymara Oropesa	21–17, 21–17	Gold
2023	Coliseo Complejo El Polvorín; San Salvador, El Salvador	(Cuba) Taymara Oropesa	21–18, 21–14	Gold

Women's doubles
Year	Venue	Partner	Opponent	Score	Result
2010	Raymond Dalmau Coliseum; Mayagüez, Puerto Rico	(Mexico) Mariana Ugalde	(Puerto Rico) Jaylene Forestier (Puerto Rico) Keara González	19–21, 18–21	Bronze
2014	Omega Complex; Veracruz, Mexico	(Mexico) Sabrina Solis	(Mexico) Cynthia González (Mexico) Mariana Ugalde	21–15, 21–17	Gold
2018	Coliseo Universidad del Norte; Barranquilla, Colombia	(Mexico) Sabrina Solis	(Cuba) Yeily Ortiz (Cuba) Taymara Oropesa	15–21, 23–21, 17–21	Silver

=== BWF International Challenge/Series (9 titles, 11 runners-up) ===
Women's singles
Year	Tournament	Opponent	Score	Result
2013	Suriname International	(Trinidad and Tobago) Solángel Guzmán	19–21, 22–20, 19–21	(silver) Runner-up
2014	Internacional Mexicano	(Mexico) Cynthia González	21–11, 21–11	(gold) Winner
2015	Santo Domingo Open	(Austria) Elisabeth Baldauf	18–21, 21–12, 19–21	(silver) Runner-up
2016	Manhattan Beach International	(Italy) Jeanine Cicognini	20–22, 9–21	(silver) Runner-up
2016	Internacional Mexicano	(Mexico) Mariana Ugalde	15–21, 21–10, 21–17	(gold) Winner
2019	Brazil International	(Brazil) Jaqueline Lima	8–21, 24–26	(silver) Runner-up
2019	Suriname International	(Czech Republic) Tereza Švábíková	16–21, 21–10, 23–21	(gold) Winner
2019	El Salvador International	(Peru) Daniela Macías	16–21, 21–14, 14–21	(silver) Runner-up
2022	Peru International Series	(Brazil) Juliana Vieira	16–21, 16–21	(silver) Runner-up
2023	Mexico Future Series	(Guatemala) Nikté Sotomayor	16–21, 20–22	(silver) Runner-up
2023	Suriname International	(Mexico) Sabrina Solis	18–21, 21–9, 21–17	(gold) Winner

Women's doubles
Year	Tournament	Partner	Opponent	Score	Result
2014	Internacional Mexicano	(Mexico) Sabrina Solis	(Mexico) Cynthia González (Mexico) Mariana Ugalde	17–21, 21–11, 20–22	(silver) Runner-up
2015	Trinidad and Tobago International	(Mexico) Sabrina Solis	(Mexico) Cynthia González (Mexico) Mariana Ugalde	19–21, 23–21, 23–21	(gold) Winner
2015	Colombia International	(Mexico) Sabrina Solis	(Brazil) Ana Paula Campos (Brazil) Fabiana Silva	18–21, 17–21	(silver) Runner-up
2015	Argentina International	(Mexico) Sabrina Solis	(Argentina) Florencia Bernatene (Argentina) Daiana Garmendia	21–7, 21–6	(gold) Winner
2015	Puerto Rico International	(Mexico) Sabrina Solis	(Brazil) Ana Paula Campos (Brazil) Fabiana Silva	21–12, 21–15	(gold) Winner
2015	Suriname International	(Mexico) Sabrina Solis	(Brazil) Ana Paula Campos (Brazil) Fabiana Silva	No match	(gold) Winner
2023	Brazil International	(Mexico) Sabrina Solis	(Brazil) Jaqueline Lima (Brazil) Sâmia Lima	11–21, 13–21	(silver) Runner-up
2023	Venezuela International	(Mexico) Sabrina Solis	(Mexico) Romina Fregoso (Mexico) Miriam Rodríguez	Walkover	(silver) Runner-up
2023	Suriname International	(Mexico) Sabrina Solis	(Trinidad and Tobago) Amara Urquhart (Suriname) Chan Yang	21–7, 21–11	(gold) Winner

BWF International Challenge tournament
BWF International Series tournament
BWF Future Series tournament
