= Cynthia González =

Mexican badminton player

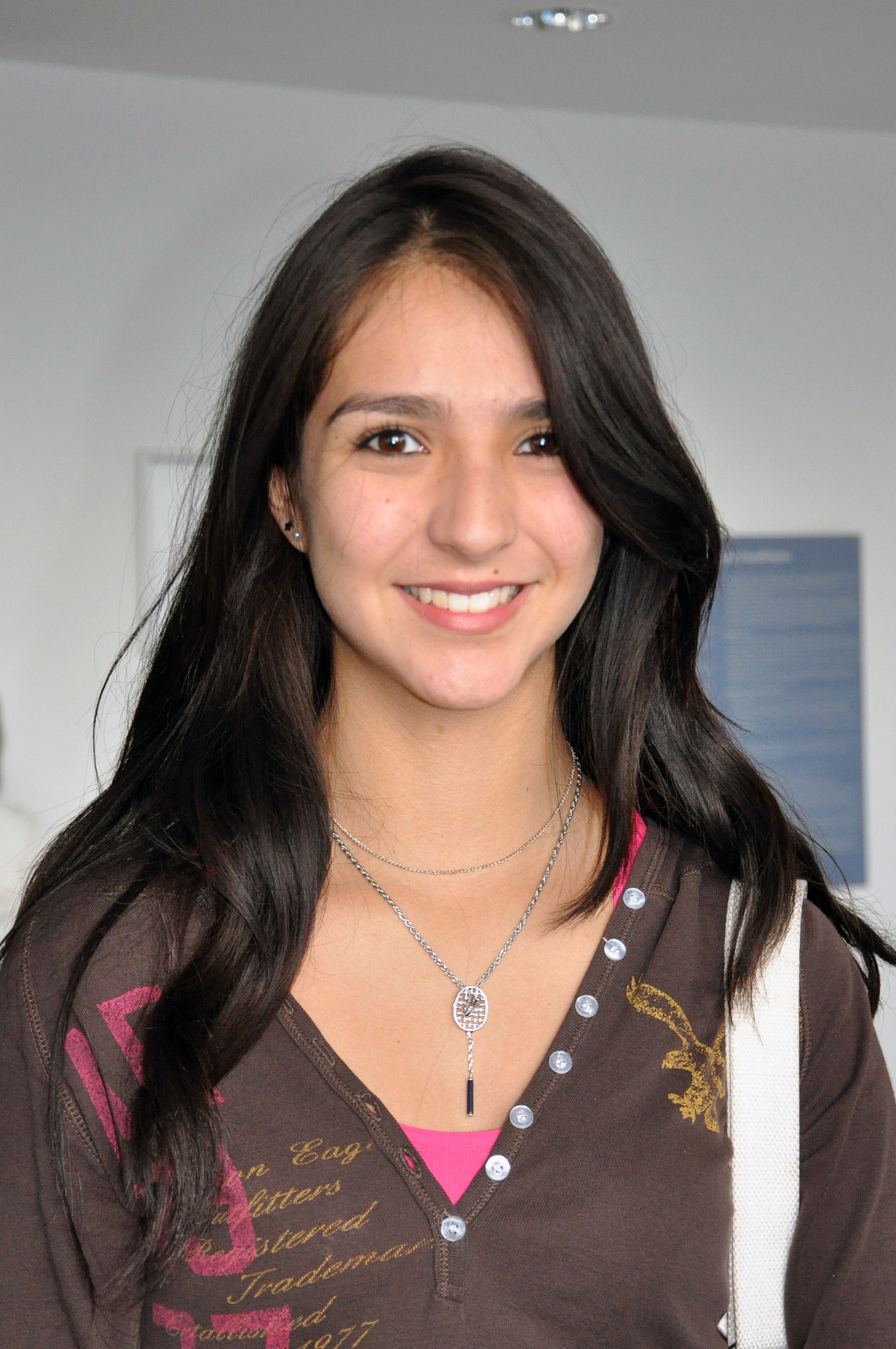

Personal information
- Born: Cynthia Cecilia González Saavedra; 29 June 1992 (age 34)
- Height: 1.80 m (5 ft 11 in)
- Weight: 68 kg (150 lb)

Sport
- Country: Mexico
- Sport: Badminton

Women's singles & doubles
- Highest ranking: 119 (WS 11 December 2014); 59 (WD 8 September 2011); 54 (XD 3 October 2013)
- BWF profile
Medal record
Women's badminton
Representing Mexico
Pan Am Championships
Bronze medal – third place	2009 Guadalajara	Mixed team
Bronze medal – third place	2017 Havana	Mixed doubles
Bronze medal – third place	2018 Guatemala City	Mixed doubles
Central American and Caribbean Games
Gold medal – first place	2010 Mayagüez	Women's doubles
Gold medal – first place	2010 Mayagüez	Women's team
Gold medal – first place	2018 Barranquilla	Mixed team
Silver medal – second place	2010 Mayagüez	Women's singles
Silver medal – second place	2014 Veracruz	Women's doubles
Silver medal – second place	2014 Veracruz	Mixed team
Bronze medal – third place	2018 Barranquilla	Women's doubles
Bronze medal – third place	2018 Barranquilla	Mixed doubles

Cynthia Cecilia González Saavedra (born 29 June 1992) is a Mexican badminton player. She won the women's doubles title at the 2010 Central American and Caribbean Games, and was part of the Mexican winning team at the Games in 2010 and 2018. González participated at the 2011 and 2015 Pan American Games.

== Achievements ==
=== Pan Am Championships ===
Mixed doubles
Year	Venue	Partner	Opponent	Score	Result
2017	Sports City Coliseum; Havana, Cuba	(Mexico) Lino Muñoz	(Canada) Nyl Yakura (Canada) Brittney Tam	16–21, 16–21	Bronze
2018	Teodoro Palacios Flores Gymnasium; Guatemala City, Guatemala	(Mexico) Andrés López	(Canada) Nyl Yakura (Canada) Kristen Tsai	11–21, 17–21	Bronze

=== Central American and Caribbean Games ===
Women's singles
Year	Venue	Opponent	Score	Result
2010	Raymond Dalmau Coliseum; Mayagüez, Puerto Rico	(Mexico) Victoria Montero	10–21, 12–21	Silver

Women's doubles
Year	Venue	Partner	Opponent	Score	Result
2010	Raymond Dalmau Coliseum; Mayagüez, Puerto Rico	(Mexico) Victoria Montero	(Puerto Rico) Jaylene Forrester (Puerto Rico) Keara Gonzalez	21–12, 21–12	Gold
2014	Omega Complex; Veracruz, Mexico	(Mexico) Mariana Ugalde	(Mexico) Haramara Gaitan (Mexico) Sabrina Solis	15–21, 17–21	Silver
2018	Coliseo Universidad del Norte; Barranquilla, Colombia	(Mexico) Mariana Ugalde	(Cuba) Yeily Ortiz (Cuba) Tahimara Oropeza	15–21, 21–13, 12–21	Bronze

Mixed doubles
Year	Venue	Partner	Opponent	Score	Result
2018	Coliseo Universidad del Norte; Barranquilla, Colombia	(Mexico) Andrés López	(Cuba) Osleni Guerrero (Cuba) Adriana Artiz	15–21, 15–21	Bronze

=== BWF International Challenge/Series ===
Women's singles
Year	Tournament	Opponent	Score	Result
2013	Argentina International	(Brazil) Lohaynny Vicente	12–21, 4–21	(silver) Runner-up
2014	Internacional Mexicano	(Mexico) Haramara Gaitan	11–21, 11–21	(silver) Runner-up

Women's doubles
Year	Tournament	Partner	Opponent	Score	Result
2010	Internacional Mexicano	(Mexico) Victoria Montero	(Mexico) Deyanira Angulo (Mexico) Aileen Chiñas	21–15, 21–13	(gold) Winner
2010	Miami PanAm International	(Mexico) Victoria Montero	(Germany) Nicole Grether (Canada) Charmaine Reid	11–21, 12–21	(silver) Runner-up
2011	Giraldilla International	(Mexico) Victoria Montero	(Indonesia) Dwi Agustiawati (Indonesia) Ayu Rahmasari	14–21, 6–21	(silver) Runner-up
2011	Mexican International	(Mexico) Victoria Montero	(Brazil) Lohaynny Vicente (Brazil) Luana Vicente	10–21, 19–21	(silver) Runner-up
2013	Internacional Mexicano	(Mexico) Victoria Montero	(Brazil) Paula Pereira (Brazil) Lohaynny Vicente	18–21, 21–17, 11–21	(silver) Runner-up
2014	Internacional Mexicano	(Mexico) Mariana Ugalde	(Mexico) Haramara Gaitan (Mexico) Sabrina Solis	21–17, 11–21, 22–20	(gold) Winner
2015	Trinidad and Tobago International	(Mexico) Mariana Ugalde	(Mexico) Haramara Gaitan (Mexico) Sabrina Solis	21–19, 21–23, 21–23	(silver) Runner-up
2015	Internacional Mexicano	(Mexico) Mariana Ugalde	(Brazil) Lohaynny Vicente (Brazil) Luana Vicente	8–21, 17–21	(silver) Runner-up
2016	Internacional Mexicano	(Mexico) Mariana Ugalde	(Mexico) Natalia Leyva (Mexico) Vanessa Villalobos	21–16, 21–11	(gold) Winner

Mixed doubles
Year	Tournament	Partner	Opponent	Score	Result
2011	Mexican International	(Mexico) Lino Muñoz	(Mexico) Andrés López (Mexico) Victoria Montero	19–21, 22–20, 14–21	(silver) Runner-up
2013	Giraldilla International	(Mexico) Lino Muñoz	(Dominican Republic) Nelson Javier (Dominican Republic) Berónica Vibieca	21–19, 25–27, 21–12	(gold) Winner
2013	Mercosul International	(Mexico) Lino Muñoz	(Brazil) Hugo Arthuso (Brazil) Fabiana Silva	21–16, 21–16	(gold) Winner
2013	Argentina International	(Mexico) Lino Muñoz	(Brazil) Hugo Arthuso (Brazil) Fabiana Silva	21–18, 9–21, 21–16	(gold) Winner
2014	Internacional Mexicano	(Mexico) Lino Muñoz	(Mexico) Job Castillo (Mexico) Sabrina Solis	16–21, 21–16, 21–13	(gold) Winner
2015	Trinidad and Tobago International	(Mexico) Lino Muñoz	(Austria) David Obernosterer (Austria) Elisabeth Baldauf	15–21, 19–21	(silver) Runner-up
2016	Internacional Mexicano	(Austria) Vilson Vattanirappel	(Mexico) Arturo Hernández (Mexico) Mariana Ugalde	15–21, 21–11, 21–14	(gold) Winner
2018	International Mexicano	(Mexico) Job Castillo	(India) Venkat Gaurav Prasad (India) Juhi Dewangan	21–18, 20–22, 15–21	(silver) Runner-up

BWF International Challenge tournament
BWF International Series tournament
BWF Future Series tournament
