= Aníbal Marroquín =

Guatemalan badminton player (born 1992)

Personal information
- Born: Lesvin Aníbal Marroquín Córdova; 7 December 1992 (age 33) Baja Verapaz, Guatemala

Sport
- Country: Guatemala
- Sport: Badminton

Men's singles & doubles
- Highest ranking: 132 (MS 7 December 2017); 65 (MD 31 January 2023); 110 (XD 17 April 2014)
- BWF profile
Medal record
Men's badminton
Representing Guatemala
Pan Am Championships
Bronze medal – third place	2014 Markham	Men's doubles
Bronze medal – third place	2017 Havana	Men's doubles
Central American and Caribbean Games
Gold medal – first place	2014 Veracruz	Men's doubles
Gold medal – first place	2014 Veracruz	Mixed team
Bronze medal – third place	2014 Veracruz	Mixed doubles
Bronze medal – third place	2018 Barranquilla	Men's doubles
Bronze medal – third place	2018 Barranquilla	Mixed team
Representing Independent Athletes Team
Pan American Games
Bronze medal – third place	2023 Santiago	Men's doubles
Representing Centro Caribe Sports
Central American and Caribbean Games
Gold medal – first place	2023 San Salvador	Men's doubles
Silver medal – second place	2023 San Salvador	Mixed team

Lesvin Aníbal Marroquín Córdova (born 7 December 1992) is a Guatemalan badminton player. He won the gold medals in the men's doubles at the 2014 and 2023 Central American and Caribbean Games. He also part of Guatemala winning team at the 2014 Central American and Caribbean Games. Marroquín claimed the bronze medal in the men's doubles at the 2023 Pan American Games.

== Achievements ==
=== Pan American Games ===
Men's doubles
Year	Venue	Partner	Opponent	Score	Result
2023	Olympic Training Center; Santiago, Chile	Jonathan Solís (EAI)	(Brazil) Fabrício Farias (Brazil) Davi Silva	18–21, 16–21	Bronze

=== Pan Am Championships ===
Men's doubles
Year	Venue	Partner	Opponent	Score	Result
2014	Markham Pan Am Centre; Markham, Canada	(Guatemala) Kevin Cordón	(United States) Phillip Chew (United States) Sattawat Pongnairat	13–21, 7–21	Bronze
2017	Sports City Coliseum; Havana, Cuba	(Guatemala) Rubén Castellanos	(Canada) Austin Bauer (Canada) Ty Alexander Lindeman	18–21, 12–21	Bronze

=== Central American and Caribbean Games ===
Men's doubles
Year	Venue	Partner	Opponent	Score	Result
2014	Omega Complex; Veracruz, Mexico	(Guatemala) Kevin Cordón	(Guatemala) Rodolfo Ramírez (Guatemala) Jonathan Solís	22–20, 22–20	Gold
2018	Coliseo Universidad del Norte; Barranquilla, Colombia	(Guatemala) Rodolfo Ramírez	(Jamaica) Gareth Henry (Jamaica) Samuel Ricketts	17–21, 18–21	Bronze
2023	Coliseo Complejo El Polvorín; San Salvador, El Salvador	Jonathan Solís	(Mexico) Job Castillo (Mexico) Luis Montoya	16–21, 21–14, 22–20	Gold

Mixed doubles
Year	Venue	Partner	Opponent	Score	Result
2014	Omega Complex; Veracruz, Mexico	(Guatemala) Beatriz Ramos	(Cuba) Osleni Guerrero (Cuba) Taymara Oropesa	13–21, 10–21	Bronze

=== BWF International Challenge/Series (14 titles, 9 runner-up) ===
Men's singles
Year	Tournament	Opponent	Score	Result
2017	Internacional Mexicano	(Guatemala) Kevin Cordón	12–21, 9–21	(silver) Runner-up

Men's doubles
Year	Tournament	Partner	Opponent	Score	Result
2012	Suriname International	(Guatemala) Heymard Humblers	(Suriname) Dylan Darmohoetomo (Suriname) Irfan Djabar	21–11, 21–16	(gold) Winner
2013	Venezuela International	(Guatemala) Heymard Humblers	(Cuba) Leodannis Martínez (Cuba) Ernesto Reyes	21–17, 21–14	(gold) Winner
2014	Mercosul International	(Guatemala) Heymard Humblers	(Guatemala) Rodolfo Ramírez (Guatemala) Jonathan Solís	14–21, 21–17, 21–13	(gold) Winner
2015	Giraldilla International	(Guatemala) Heymard Humblers	(Italy) Giovanni Greco (Italy) Rosario Maddaloni	17–21, 15–21	(silver) Runner-up
2016	Colombia International	(Guatemala) Rubén Castellanos	(Guatemala) Rodolfo Ramírez (Guatemala) Jonathan Solís	Walkover	(gold) Winner
2017	Guatemala Future Series	(Guatemala) Rubén Castellanos	(Guatemala) Rodolfo Ramírez (Guatemala) Jonathan Solís	17–21, 13–21	(silver) Runner-up
2017	Mercosul International	(Guatemala) Kevin Cordón	(Guatemala) Rodolfo Ramírez (Guatemala) Jonathan Solís	21–15, 13–21, 13–21	(silver) Runner-up
2018	Guatemala International	(Guatemala) Rubén Castellanos	(Cuba) Osleni Guerrero (Cuba) Leodannis Martínez	21–12, 21–17	(gold) Winner
2018	El Salvador International	(Guatemala) Rubén Castellanos	(Guatemala) Brandon Alavardo (Guatemala) Christopher Martínez	17–21, 21–10, 21–16	(gold) Winner
2019	Peru International	(Guatemala) Rubén Castellanos	(Brazil) Fabrício Farias (Brazil) Francielton Farias	22–20, 21–17	(gold) Winner
2019	Internacional Mexicano	(Guatemala) Jonathan Solís	(Mexico) Andrés López (Mexico) Lino Muñoz	21–16, 21–13	(gold) Winner
2019	Guatemala Future Series	(Guatemala) Jonathan Solís	(Guatemala) Brandon Alavardo (Guatemala) Christopher Martínez	21–16, 21–16	(gold) Winner
2019	El Salvador International	(Guatemala) Jonathan Solís	(Guatemala) Brandon Alavardo (Guatemala) Christopher Martínez	23–21, 21–17	(gold) Winner
2020	Jamaica International	(Guatemala) Jonathan Solís	(Jamaica) Samuel Ricketts (Jamaica) Shane Wilson	22–20, 21–15	(gold) Winner
2021	Santo Domingo Open	(Guatemala) Jonathan Solís	(Guatemala) Rubén Castellanos (Guatemala) Christopher Martínez	21–10, 21–19	(gold) Winner
2021	Peru International	(Guatemala) Jonathan Solís	(Algeria) Koceila Mammeri (Algeria) Youcef Sabri Medel	18–21, 15–21	(silver) Runner-up
2021	Guatemala International	(Guatemala) Jonathan Solís	(Canada) Kevin Lee (Canada) Ty Alexander Lindeman	21–19, 17–21, 10–21	(silver) Runner-up
2022	Brazil International	(Guatemala) Jonathan Solís	(Brazil) Fabrício Farias (Brazil) Francielton Farias	12–21, 17–21	(silver) Runner-up
2022	Guatemala International	(Guatemala) Jonathan Solís	(Guatemala) Rubén Castellanos (Guatemala) Christopher Martínez	18–21, 21–18, 21–8	(gold) Winner

Mixed doubles
Year	Tournament	Partner	Opponent	Score	Result
2013	Carebaco International	(Guatemala) Krisley López	(Jamaica) Gareth Henry (Jamaica) Geordine Henry	21–16, 21–19	(gold) Winner
2017	Mercosul International	(Guatemala) Mariana Paiz	(Brazil) Artur Pomoceno (Brazil) Fabiana Silva	21–19, 18–21, 21–23	(silver) Runner-up
2018	El Salvador International	(Peru) Dánica Nishimura	(Canada) Brian Yang (Canada) Catherine Choi	6–21, 7–21	(silver) Runner-up

BWF International Challenge tournament
BWF International Series tournament
BWF Future Series tournament
