= Giraldilla International =

International badminton tournament

The Giraldilla International is an international badminton tournament, which is organized as an open championship of Cuba. The competition is held annually since 2000 and is now a young supraregional Badminton Championship. The organizer was the Cuban Badminton Association (Federación Cubana de Badminton) in cooperation with the Badminton Pan Am continental federation.

At 2013, the tournament was classified as "Future Series" by the Badminton World Federation (BWF), since the fifteenth event in March 2014 Giraldilla classified as "International Series" level, which held on to win the tournament before $1,700 now $2,500 points for the world ranking will be credited.

The tournament is named after the unofficial symbol of the city of Havana, "La Giraldilla" is a bronze weathervane in female figure on the oldest fortress of the city, the Castillo de la Real Fuerza. Until 2012, it was held in Pinar del Río, Havana is the host city of the tournament.

The 16th edition was held in March 2015 at Havana. Registration of participants is carried out in each case solely on the WBF. On the players who reach at least the semi-finals, a staggered by ranking prize pool of currently $5,000 will be paid.

== Previous winners ==
Year	Men's singles	Women's singles	Men's doubles	Women's doubles	Mixed doubles	Ref
2000	(Wales) Richard Vaughan	(Japan) Takako Ida	(Japan) Keita Masuda (Japan) Tadashi Ohtsuka	(Japan) Satomi Igawa (Japan) Hiroko Nagamine	(Japan) Norio Imai (Japan) Chikako Nakayama	
2001	(Japan) Shōji Satō	(Cuba) Dayanis Álvarez	(Japan) Shōji Satō (Japan) Sho Sasaki	(Cuba) Isaura Medina (Cuba) Yudielis Lazo	(Cuba) Oscar Pérez (Cuba) Yudielis Lazo	
2002	(Italy) Li Yong Ying	(Cuba) Dayanis Álvarez	(Italy) Christian Bernhard (Italy) Cristiano Bevilacqua	(Cuba) Dunia Bencomo (Cuba) Yudielis Lazo	(Cuba) Lázaro Yonier Jerez (Cuba) Dayanis Álvarez	
2003	(Japan) Sho Sasaki	(Germany) Xu Huaiwen	(Belgium) Wouter Claes (Belgium) Frédéric Mawet	(Japan) Yoshiko Iwata (Japan) Miyuki Tai	(Japan) Takanori Aoki (Japan) Miyuki Tai	
2004	(Japan) Yuichi Ikeda	(Cuba) Isaura Medina	(Cuba) Yunier Álvarez (Cuba) Alexander Hernández	(Cuba) Leydi E. Mora (Cuba) Isaura Medina	(Cuba) Ilian Perez (Cuba) Solángel Guzmán	
2005	(England) Toby Honey	(Italy) Agnese Allegrini	(Spain) José Antonio Crespo (Spain) Nicolás Escartín	(Canada) Helen Nichol (Canada) Charmaine Reid	(Spain) José Antonio Crespo (Spain) Yoana Martínez	
2006	(Spain) Pablo Abián	(Italy) Agnese Allegrini	(Cuba) Ilian Perez (Cuba) Lázaro Yonier	(Cuba) Solángel Guzmán (Cuba) Isuara Medina	(Cuba) Yunier Álvarez (Cuba) Isuara Medina	
2007	(Spain) Pablo Abián	(Italy) Agnese Allegrini	(France) Lenaic Luong (France) Nabil Lasmari	(Cuba) Solángel Guzmán (Cuba) Leydi Edith Mora	(Italy) Klaus Raffeiner (Italy) Agnese Allegrini	
2008	(Belgium) Yuhan Tan	(Cuba) Solángel Guzmán	(Cuba) Alexander Hernández (Cuba) Osleni Guerrero	(Cuba) Solángel Guzmán (Cuba) Lisandra Suárez	(Cuba) Osleni Guerrero (Cuba) Lisandra Suárez	
2009	(Indonesia) Ari Trisnanto	(Cuba) Solángel Guzmán	(Indonesia) Rizki Yanu Kresnayandi (Indonesia) Albert Saputra	(Cuba) Solángel Guzmán (Cuba) Lisandra Suárez	(Cuba) Alexander Hernández (Cuba) María L. Hernández	
2010	(Cuba) Osleni Guerrero	(Indonesia) Siti Anida Lestari Qoryatin	(Indonesia) Berry Angriawan (Indonesia) Muhammad Ulinnuha	(Indonesia) Ni Made Claudia (Indonesia) Aurien Hudiono	(Indonesia) Berry Angriawan (Indonesia) Ni Made Claudia	
2011	(Indonesia) Arief Gifar Ramadhan	(Indonesia) Putri Muthia Restu Pangersa	(Indonesia) Berry Angriawan (Indonesia) Christopher Rusdianto	(Indonesia) Dwi Agustiawati (Indonesia) Ayu Rahmasari	(Indonesia) Christopher Rusdianto (Indonesia) Dwi Agustiawati	
2012	(Cuba) Osleni Guerrero	(Peru) Cristina Aicardi	(Cuba) Ernesto Reyes (Cuba) Ronald Toledo	(Peru) Daniela Macías (Peru) Luz María Zornoza	(Venezuela) Luis Camacho (Venezuela) Johanny Quintero	
2013	(Cuba) Osleni Guerrero	(Peru) Camila García	(Czech Republic) Jan Fröhlich (Czech Republic) Zdeněk Sváta	(Peru) Camila García (Peru) Dánica Nishimura	(Mexico) Lino Muñoz (Mexico) Cynthia González	
2014	(Czech Republic) Jan Fröhlich	(Italy) Jeanine Cicognini	(Guatemala) Rodolfo Ramírez (Guatemala) Jonathan Solís	(Peru) Dánica Nishimura (Peru) Luz María Zornoza	(Cuba) Osleni Guerrero (Cuba) Tahimara Oropeza	
2015	(Cuba) Osleni Guerrero	(Turkey) Ebru Tunalı	(Italy) Giovanni Greco (Italy) Rosario Maddaloni	(Turkey) Cemre Fere (Turkey) Ebru Yazgan	(Peru) Mario Cuba (Peru) Katherine Winder	
2016	(Cuba) Osleni Guerrero	(Austria) Elisabeth Baldauf	(Cuba) Leodannis Martínez (Cuba) Ernesto Reyes	(Peru) Daniela Macías (Peru) Luz María Zornoza	(Austria) David Obernosterer (Austria) Elisabeth Baldauf	
2017	(Cuba) Osleni Guerrero	(Hungary) Laura Sárosi	(Cuba) Osleni Guerrero (Cuba) Leodannis Martínez	(Hungary) Laura Sárosi (Mexico) Mariana Ugalde	(Cuba) Leodannis Martínez (Cuba) Tahimara Oropeza	
2018	(Canada) Xiaodong Sheng	(United States) Crystal Pan	(Cuba) Osleni Guerrero (Cuba) Leodannis Martínez	(Cuba) Thalía Mengana (Cuba) Tahimara Oropeza	(Cuba) Osleni Guerrero (Cuba) Adriana Artiz	
2019	(Mexico) Job Castillo	(Wales) Jordan Hart	(Peru) José Guevara (Peru) Daniel la Torre	(Peru) Daniela Macías (Peru) Dánica Nishimura	(Peru) Mario Cuba (Peru) Daniela Macías	
2020	Cancelled (Note: This tournament, originally to be played from 18 to 22 March, was later cancelled due to the COVID-19 pandemic in Cuba)					
2021	Cancelled (Note: This tournament, originally to be played from 17 to 21 March, was later cancelled due to the COVID-19 pandemic in Cuba.)					
2022	Cancelled (Note: This tournament, originally to be played from 16 to 20 March, was later cancelled due to the COVID-19 pandemic in Cuba.)					
2023	(Indonesia) Muhammad Halim As Sidiq	(Bulgaria) Hristomira Popovska	(England) Kelvin Ho (Jamaica) Samuel Ricketts	(Cuba) Taymara Oropesa (Cuba) Yeily Ortiz	(Bulgaria) Iliyan Stoynov (Bulgaria) Hristomira Popovska	
2024	(Jamaica) Samuel Ricketts	(Cuba) Taymara Oropesa	(Guatemala) Yeison del Cid (Guatemala) Christopher Martínez	(Guatemala) Diana Corleto (Guatemala) Mariana Paiz	(Guatemala) Christopher Martínez (Guatemala) Mariana Paiz	
2025	(Guatemala) Yeison del Cid	(Italy) Yasmine Hamza	(Guatemala) Christopher Martínez (Guatemala) Jonathan Solís	(Cuba) Leyanis Contreras (Cuba) Taymara Oropesa	(Guatemala) Christopher Martínez (Guatemala) Diana Corleto	
2026	(El Salvador) Uriel Canjura	(Cuba) Taymara Oropesa	(United States) Kathiravun Manivannan (United States) Mukil Nambikumar	(Dominican Republic) Clarisa Pie (Dominican Republic) Nairoby Abigail Jiménez	(Cuba) Roberto Herrera (Cuba) Taymara Oropesa	

== Performances by nation ==
As of the 2026 edition

Rank	Nation	MS	WS	MD	WD	XD	Total
1	Cuba	6	7	7	10	10	40
2	Indonesia	3	2	3	2	2	12
3	Japan	3	1	2	2	2	10
3	Peru		2	1	5	2	10
5	Italy	1	5	2		1	9
6	Guatemala	1		3	1	2	7
7	Spain	2		1		1	4
8	Mexico	1			0.5	1	2.5
9	Austria		1			1	2
9	Belgium	1		1			2
9	Bulgaria		1			1	2
9	Canada	1			1		2
9	Czech Republic	1		1			2
9	Turkey		1		1		2
9	United States		1	1			2
9	Wales	1	1				2
17	England	1		0.5			1.5
17	Hungary		1		0.5		1.5
17	Jamaica	1		0.5			1.5
20	Dominican Republic				1		1
20	El Salvador	1					1
20	France			1			1
20	Germany		1				1
20	Venezuela					1	1
Total		24	24	24	24	24	120
