= Lino Muñoz =

Mexican badminton player (born 1991)

Personal information
- Born: Lino Muñoz Mandujano; 8 February 1991 (age 35) Mexico City, Mexico
- Height: 1.74 m (5 ft 9 in)
- Weight: 65 kg (143 lb)

Sport
- Country: Mexico
- Sport: Badminton

Men's singles & doubles
- Highest ranking: 65 (MS 18 February 2020); 38 (MD 30 June 2012); 54 (XD 3 October 2013)
- BWF profile
Medal record
Men's badminton
Representing Mexico
Pan American Games
Bronze medal – third place	2011 Guadalajara	Men's doubles
Bronze medal – third place	2015 Toronto	Men's doubles
Pan American Championships
Bronze medal – third place	2012 Lima	Men's doubles
Bronze medal – third place	2017 Havana	Mixed doubles
Bronze medal – third place	2018 Guatemala City	Men's doubles
Pan Am Male Cup
Silver medal – second place	2020 Salvador	Men's team
Bronze medal – third place	2022 Acapulco	Men's team
Central American & Caribbean Games
Gold medal – first place	2018 Barranquilla	Mixed team
Silver medal – second place	2010 Mayagüez	Men's doubles
Silver medal – second place	2014 Veracruz	Mixed team
Bronze medal – third place	2010 Mayagüez	Men's team
Bronze medal – third place	2014 Veracruz	Men's singles
Bronze medal – third place	2018 Barranquilla	Men's singles

Lino Muñoz Mandujano (Note: In this Spanish name, the first or paternal surname is Muñoz and the second or maternal family name is Mandujano.) (born 8 February 1991) is a Mexican badminton player. He competed at the 2016 Summer Olympics in Rio de Janeiro, Brazil.

== Achievements ==
=== Pan American Games ===
Men's doubles
Year	Venue	Partner	Opponent	Score	Result
2011	Multipurpose Gymnasium; Guadalajara, Mexico	(Mexico) Andrés López	(United States) Howard Bach (United States) Tony Gunawan	12–21, 12–21	Bronze
2015	Atos Markham Pan Am Centre; Toronto, Canada	(Mexico) Job Castillo	(United States) Phillip Chew (United States) Sattawat Pongnairat	19–21, 13–21	Bronze

=== Pan Am Championships ===
Men's doubles
Year	Venue	Partner	Opponent	Score	Result
2012	Manuel Bonilla Stadium; Lima, Peru	(Mexico) Andrés López	(Brazil) Daniel Paiola (Brazil) Alex Yuwan Tjong	12–21, 21–16, 17–21	Bronze
2018	Teodoro Palacios Flores Gymnasium; Guatemala City, Guatemala	(Mexico) Job Castillo	(United States) Phillip Chew (United States) Ryan Chew	22–24, 10–21	Bronze

Mixed doubles
Year	Venue	Partner	Opponent	Score	Result
2017	Sports City Coliseum; Havana, Cuba	(Mexico) Cynthia González	(Canada) Nyl Yakura (Canada) Brittney Tam	16–21, 16–21	Bronze

=== Central American and Caribbean Games ===
Men's singles
Year	Venue	Opponent	Score	Result
2014	Omega Complex; Veracruz, Mexico	(Guatemala) Kevin Cordón	12–21, 18–21	Bronze
2018	Coliseo Universidad del Norte; Barranquilla, Colombia	(Cuba) Osleni Guerrero	15–21, 12–21	Bronze

Men's doubles
Year	Venue	Partner	Opponent	Score	Result
2010	Raymond Dalmau Coliseum; Mayagüez, Puerto Rico	(Mexico) Andrés López	(Guatemala) Kevin Cordón (Guatemala) Rodolfo Ramírez	21–18, 17–21, 6–21	Silver

=== BWF International Challenge/Series ===
Men's singles
Year	Tournament	Opponent	Score	Result
2014	Internacional Mexicano	(Mexico) Luis Ramon Garrido	18–21, 21–19, 14–21	(silver) Runner-up
2015	Argentina International	(United States) Bjorn Seguin	11–21, 13–21	(silver) Runner-up
2019	Mexico Future Series	(Cuba) Osleni Guerrero	22–20, 18–21, 15–21	(silver) Runner-up
2019	International Mexicano	(Guatemala) Kevin Cordón	16–21, 13–21	(silver) Runner-up
2019	Guatemala International	(Guatemala) Kevin Cordón	6–21, 3–11 Retired	(silver) Runner-up
2019	Brazil International	(Guatemala) Kevin Cordón	19–21, 19–21	(silver) Runner-up

Men's doubles
Year	Venue	Partner	Opponent	Score	Result
2010	Internacional Mexicano	(Mexico) Andrés López	(Mexico) Mauricio Casillas (Mexico) José Luis Gonzalez	28–26, 14–21, 21–14	(gold) Winner
2011	Internacional Mexicano	(Mexico) Andrés López	(Brazil) Luis Henrique Dos Santos Jr. (Brazil) Alex Yuwan Tjong	15–21, 21–14, 21–18	(gold) Winner
2014	Internacional Mexicano	(Mexico) Arturo Hernández	(Mexico) Job Castillo (Mexico) Antonio Ocegueda	14–21, 15–21	(silver) Runner-up
2015	Chile International	(Mexico) Job Castillo	(Guatemala) Rodolfo Ramírez (Guatemala) Jonathan Solís	21–17, 21–10	(gold) Winner
2015	Trinidad & Tobago International	(Mexico) Luis Ramon Garrido	(Mexico) Job Castillo (Mexico) Antonio Ocegueda	21–16, 22–24, 21–19	(gold) Winner
2015	Santo Domingo Open	(Mexico) Job Castillo	(Peru) Mario Cuba (Peru) Martín del Valle	21–18, 24–26, 21–17	(gold) Winner
2015	Internacional Mexicano	(Mexico) Job Castillo	(Brazil) Hugo Arthuso (Brazil) Daniel Paiola	13–21, 21–12, 22–20	(gold) Winner
2015	Argentina International	(Mexico) Job Castillo	(Guatemala) Daniel Humblers (Chile) Bastián Lizama	21–10, 21–15	(gold) Winner
2015	Brazil International	(Mexico) Job Castillo	(Brazil) Hugo Arthuso (Brazil) Daniel Paiola	21–18, 21–14	(gold) Winner
2015	Puerto Rico International	(Mexico) Job Castillo	(Czech Republic) Jan Fröhlich (Slovakia) Matej Hliničan	21–19, 22–20	(gold) Winner
2015	Suriname International	(Mexico) Job Castillo	(Italy) Giovanni Greco (Italy) Rosario Maddaloni	No Match	(gold) Winner
2016	Guatemala International	(Mexico) Job Castillo	(India) Alwin Francis (India) Tarun Kona	8–21, 14–21	(silver) Runner-up
2016	Peru International Series	(Mexico) Job Castillo	(India) Alwin Francis (India) Tarun Kona	8–21, 12–21	(silver) Runner-up
2017	Internacional Mexicano	(Mexico) Job Castillo	(Canada) Jason Ho-Shue (Canada) Nyl Yakura	21–18, 11–21, 17–21	(silver) Runner-up
2018	Peru International	(Mexico) Job Castillo	(United States) Enrico Asuncion (Philippines) Carlo Glenn Remo	21–19, 14–21, 18–21	(silver) Runner-up
2019	International Mexicano	(Mexico) Andrés López	(Guatemala) Jonathan Solís (Guatemala) Anibal Marroquin	16–21, 13–21	(silver) Runner-up

Mixed doubles
Year	Venue	Partner	Opponent	Score	Result
2012	Internacional Mexicano	(Mexico) Cynthia González	(Mexico) Andrés López (Mexico) Victoria Montero	19–21, 22–20, 14–21	(silver) Runner-up
2013	Giraldilla International	(Mexico) Cynthia González	(Dominican Republic) Nelson Javier (Dominican Republic) Berónica Vibieca	21–19, 25–27, 21–12	(gold) Winner
2013	Mercosul International	(Mexico) Cynthia González	(Brazil) Hugo Arthuso (Brazil) Fabiana Silva	21–16, 21–16	(gold) Winner
2013	Argentina International	(Mexico) Cynthia González	(Brazil) Hugo Arthuso (Brazil) Fabiana Silva	21–18, 9–21, 21–16	(gold) Winner
2015	Internacional Mexicano	(Mexico) Cynthia González	(Mexico) Job Castillo (Mexico) Sabrina Solis	16–21, 21–16, 21–13	(gold) Winner
2015	Trinidad & Tobago International	(Mexico) Cynthia González	(Austria) David Obernosterer (Austria) Elisabeth Baldauf	15–21, 19–21	(silver) Runner-up

BWF International Challenge tournament
BWF International Series tournament
BWF Future Series tournament
