= Rodolfo Ramírez =

Guatemalan badminton player

Rudolfo Ramírez
Personal information
- Born: Maldonado Rodolfo José Ramírez García; 31 July 1988 (age 38) Guatemala City, Guatemala
- Height: 1.80 m (5 ft 11 in)
- Weight: 73 kg (161 lb)

Sport
- Country: Guatemala
- Sport: Badminton

Men's singles & doubles
- Highest ranking: 97 (MS 14 October 2010); 43 (MD 21 October 2010); 241 (XD 26 August 2010)
- BWF profile
Medal record
Men's badminton
Representing Guatemala
Pan American Championships
Gold medal – first place	2009 Guadalajara	Men's doubles
Silver medal – second place	2008 Lima	Men's doubles
Bronze medal – third place	2018 Guatemala City	Men's doubles
Bronze medal – third place	2013 Santo Domingo	Men's doubles
Central American and Caribbean Games
Gold medal – first place	2014 Veracruz	Mixed team
Gold medal – first place	2010 Mayagüez	Men's doubles
Gold medal – first place	2010 Mayagüez	Men's team
Silver medal – second place	2014 Veracruz	Men's doubles
Silver medal – second place	2006 Cartagena	Mixed team
Bronze medal – third place	2018 Barranquilla	Men's doubles
Bronze medal – third place	2018 Barranquilla	Mixed team
Bronze medal – third place	2014 Veracruz	Men's singles
Bronze medal – third place	2010 Mayagüez	Men's singles
Bronze medal – third place	2010 Mayagüez	Mixed doubles
Bronze medal – third place	2006 Cartagena	Men's doubles

Maldonado Rodolfo José Ramírez García (Note: In this Spanish name, the first or paternal surname is Ramírez and the second or maternal family name is García.) (born 31 July 1988) is a Guatemalan badminton player and coach. Rodolfo Ramirez won the Men's Doubles event at the Pan American Badminton Championships in 2009 with partner Kevin Cordón. They together also won a gold medal at the 2010 CACSO Games. From 19 to 21 April 2022 Rodolfo Ramirez was appointed headcoach at the Caribbean Easter badminton camp 2022 in Paramaribo, Suriname.

== Achievements ==
=== Pan Am Championships ===
Men's doubles
Year	Venue	Partner	Opponent	Score	Result
2018	Teodoro Palacios Flores Gymnasium; Guatemala City, Guatemala	(Guatemala) Jonathan Solís	(Canada) Jason Ho-shue (Canada) Nyl Yakura	12–21, 11–21	Bronze
2013	Palacio de los Deportes Virgilio Travieso Soto; Santo Domingo, Dominican Republic	(Guatemala) Jonathan Solís	(Canada) Kevin Li (Canada) Nyl Yakura	17–21, 16–21	Bronze
2009	Coliseo Olímpico de la Universidad de Guadalajara; Guadalajara, Mexico	(Guatemala) Kevin Cordón	(Peru) Antonio de Vinatea (Peru) Martin del Valle	21–18, 17–21, 23–21	Gold
2008	Club de Regatas; Lima, Peru	(Guatemala) Kevin Cordón	(Canada) Toby Ng (Canada) William Milroy	16–21, 9–21	Silver

=== Central American and Caribbean Games ===
Men's singles
Year	Venue	Opponent	Score	Result
2014	Omega Complex; Veracruz, Mexico	(Cuba) Osleni Guerrero	19–21, 15–21	Bronze
2010	Raymond Dalmau Coliseum; Mayagüez, Puerto Rico	(Guatemala) Pedro Yang	21–14, 18–21, 17–21	Bronze

Men's doubles
Year	Venue	Partner	Opponent	Score	Result
2018	Coliseo Universidad del Norte; Barranquilla, Colombia	(Guatemala) Aníbal Marroquín	(Jamaica) Gareth Henry (Jamaica) Samuel Ricketts	17–21, 18–21	Bronze
2014	Omega Complex; Veracruz, Mexico	(Guatemala) Jonathan Solís	(Guatemala) Kevin Cordón (Guatemala) Aníbal Marroquín	20–22, 20–22	Silver
2010	Raymond Dalmau Coliseum; Mayagüez, Puerto Rico	(Guatemala) Kevin Cordón	(Mexico) Andrés López (Mexico) Lino Muñoz	18–21, 21–17, 21–6	Gold
2006	Pavilion of Parque del Este; Santo Domingo, Dominican Republic	(Guatemala) Kevin Cordón	(Cuba) Lazaro Jerez (Cuba) Ilian Perez	21–12, 13–21, 15–21	Bronze

Mixed doubles
Year	Venue	Partner	Opponent	Score	Result
2010	Raymond Dalmau Coliseum; Mayagüez, Puerto Rico	(Guatemala) Nikte Sotomayor	(Jamaica) Gareth Henry (Jamaica) Kristal Karjohn	21–18, 9–21, 15–21	Bronze

=== BWF International Challenge/Series (16 titles, 15 runner-up) ===
Men's singles
Year	Tournament	Opponent	Score	Result
2016	Colombia International	(Guatemala) Ruben Castellanos	0–1 Retired	(silver) Runner-up
2014	Chile International	(Guatemala) Kevin Cordón	11–9, 9–11, 2–11, 6–11	(silver) Runner-up
2014	Mercosul International	(Guatemala) Kevin Cordón	14–21, 16–21	(silver) Runner-up
2013	Guatemala International	(Cuba) Osleni Guerrero	21–10, 25–23	(gold) Winner
2011	Carebaco International	(United States) Howard Shu	21–14, 17–21, 20–22	(silver) Runner-up
2010	Guatemala International	(Guatemala) Kevin Cordón	14–21, 16–21	(silver) Runner-up
2009	Guatemala International	(Guatemala) Kevin Cordón	16–21, 12–21	(silver) Runner-up
2009	Santo Domingo Open	(Guatemala) Kevin Cordon	17–21, 12–21	(silver) Runner-up

Men's doubles
Year	Tournament	Partner	Opponent	Score	Result
2019	Jamaica International	(Guatemala) Jonathan Solís	(Jamaica) Gareth Henry (Jamaica) Samuel Ricketts	21–8, 14–21, 21–18	(gold) Winner
2018	Suriname International	(Guatemala) Jonathan Solís	(Jamaica) Dennis Coke (Jamaica) Anthony Mcnee	Walkover	(silver) Runner-up
2018	Santo Domingo Open	(Guatemala) Jonathan Solís	(Canada) Joshua Hurlburt-Yu (Canada) Duncan Yao	19–21, 21–16, 17–21	(silver) Runner-up
2017	Mercosul International	(Guatemala) Jonathan Solís	(Guatemala) Kevin Cordon (Guatemala) Anibal Marroquin	15–21, 21–13, 21–13	(gold) Winner
2017	Guatemala International	(Guatemala) Jonathan Solís	(United States) Phillip Chew (United States) Ryan Chew	10–21, 16–21	(silver) Runner-up
2017	Guatemala Future Series	(Guatemala) Jonathan Solís	(Guatemala) Rubén Castellanos (Guatemala) Aníbal Marroquín	21–17, 21–13	(gold) Winner
2016	Colombia International	(Guatemala) Jonathan Solís	(Guatemala) Rubén Castellanos (Guatemala) Aníbal Marroquín	Walkover	(silver) Runner-up
2015	Chile International	(Guatemala) Jonathan Solís	(Mexico) Job Castillo (Mexico) Lino Munoz	17–21, 10–21	(silver) Runner-up
2015	Jamaica International	(Guatemala) Jonathan Solís	(Turkey) Emre Vural (Turkey) Sİnan Zorlu	18–21, 21–15, 21–12	(gold) Winner
2014	Guatemala International	(Guatemala) Jonathan Solís	(France) Laurent Constantin (France) Matthieu Lo Ying Ping	9–11, 7–11, 11–9, 11–9, 10–11	(silver) Runner-up
2014	Argentina International	(Guatemala) Jonathan Solís	(Brazil) Hugo Arthuso (Brazil) Daniel Paiola	21–15, 21–18	(gold) Winner
2014	Mercosul International	(Guatemala) Jonathan Solís	(Guatemala) Heymard Humblers (Guatemala) Aníbal Marroquín	21–14, 17–21, 13–21	(silver) Runner-up
2014	Giraldilla International	(Guatemala) Jonathan Solís	(United States) Matthew Fogarty (United States) Bjorn Seguin	21–15, 21–11	(gold) Winner
2013	Guatemala International	(Guatemala) Jonathan Solís	(Dominican Republic) Nelson Javier (Dominican Republic) Alberto Raposo	21–13, 21–18	(gold) Winner
2012	Guatemala International	(Guatemala) Jonathan Solís	(Scotland) Alistair Casey (Mexico) Andres Quadri	21–14, 16–21, 21–13	(gold) Winner
2010	Guatemala International	(Guatemala) Kevin Cordón	(Canada) Adrian Liu (Canada) Derrick Ng	21–23, 20–22	(silver) Runner-up
2010	Santo Domingo Open	(Guatemala) Kevin Cordón	(Canada) Adrian Liu (Canada) Derrick Ng	21–18, 24–22	(gold) Winner
2010	Suriname International	(Guatemala) Kevin Cordón	(Suriname) Virgil Soeroredjo (Suriname) Mitchel Wongsodikromo	21–14, 21–16	(gold) Winner
2009	Guatemala International	(Guatemala) Kevin Cordón	(United States) Mathew Fogarthy (United States) David Neuman	21–16 21–14	(gold) Winner
2009	Santo Domingo Open	(Guatemala) Kevin Cordón	(United States) Phillip Chew (United States) Halim Haryanto Ho	21–23, 21–15, 21–17	(gold) Winner
2009	Puerto Rico International	(Guatemala) Kevin Cordón	(United States) Phillip Chew (United States) Halim Haryanto Ho	21–19, 13–21, 21–16	(gold) Winner
2009	Peru International	(Guatemala) Kevin Cordón	(Spain) Jose Vicente Martinez (Spain) Javier Tur	16–21, 8–2 Retired	(gold) Winner

Mixed doubles
Year	Tournament	Partner	Opponent	Score	Result
2009	Guatemala International	(Peru) Lorena Duany	(Spain) Alejandro Barriga (Spain) Sandra Chirlaque	21–18, 21–14	(gold) Winner

BWF International Challenge tournament
BWF International Series tournament
BWF Future Series tournament
