= Trinidad and Tobago International =

International badminton tournament

The Trinidad and Tobago International in badminton is an international open held in Trinidad and Tobago.

== Previous winners ==
Year	Men's singles	Women's singles	Men's doubles	Women's doubles	Mixed doubles
2015	(Canada) Martin Giuffre	(Austria) Elisabeth Baldauf	(Mexico) Luis Ramon Garrido (Mexico) Lino Munoz	(Mexico) Haramara Gaitan (Mexico) Sabrina Solis	(Austria) David Obernosterer (Austria) Elisabeth Baldauf
2016– 2022	No competition				
2023	(United States) Mark Alcala	(Canada) Eliana Zhang	(United States) Ryan Ma (Canada) Daniel Zhou	(Canada) Jeslyn Chow (Canada) Eliana Zhang	(Jamaica) Samuel Ricketts (Jamaica) Tahlia Richardson
2024	No competition				
2025	(Switzerland) Julien Scheiwiller	(Italy) Gianna Stiglich	(Slovakia) Andrej Suchý (Slovakia) Simeon Suchý	(Jamaica) Breanna Bisnott (Jamaica) Tahlia Richardson	(Trinidad and Tobago) Parth Mehta (Trinidad and Tobago) Chequeda de Boulet

== Performances by nation ==
As of the 2025 edition

Pos	Nation	MS	WS	MD	WD	XD	Total
1	Canada	1	1	0.5	1	0	3.5
2	Austria	0	1	0	0	1	2
2	Jamaica	0	0	0	1	1	2
2	Mexico	0	0	1	1	0	2
5	United States	1	0	0.5	0	0	1.5
6	Italy	0	1	0	0	0	1
6	Slovakia	0	0	1	0	0	1
6	Trinidad and Tobago	0	0	0	0	1	1
6	Switzerland	1	0	0	0	0	1
Total		3	3	3	3	3	15
