= Taymara Oropesa =

Cuban badminton player (born 1995)

Personal information
- Born: Taymara Oropesa Pupo; 6 December 1995 (age 30) Holguín, Cuba
- Height: 1.67 m (5 ft 6 in)
- Weight: 60 kg (132 lb)

Sport
- Country: Cuba
- Sport: Badminton

Women's singles & doubles
- Highest ranking: 96 (WS 13 August 2019); 117 (WD 13 August 2019); 64 (XD 5 July 2018)
- BWF profile
Medal record
Women's badminton
Representing Cuba
Pan American Games
| Bronze medal – third place | 2023 Santiago | Women's singles |
Central American and Caribbean Games
| Gold medal – first place | 2014 Veracruz | Mixed doubles |
| Gold medal – first place | 2018 Barranquilla | Women's doubles |
| Gold medal – first place | 2026 Santo Domingo | Women's singles |
| Silver medal – second place | 2018 Barranquilla | Women's singles |
| Silver medal – second place | 2018 Barranquilla | Mixed doubles |
| Silver medal – second place | 2018 Barranquilla | Mixed team |
| Silver medal – second place | 2023 San Salvador | Women's singles |
| Silver medal – second place | 2026 Santo Domingo | Women's doubles |
| Bronze medal – third place | 2014 Veracruz | Women's doubles |
| Bronze medal – third place | 2014 Veracruz | Mixed team |
| Bronze medal – third place | 2026 Santo Domingo | Mixed doubles |

Taymara Oropesa Pupo (born 6 December 1995) is a Cuban badminton player.

== Career ==
Oropesa started playing badminton at aged 14. She actually playing tennis since she was eight. She made the change because her mother asked her to find another sport where she was less exposed to the sun. In 2014, she competed at the Central American and Caribbean Games and she won gold in the mixed doubles event and two bronze medals in the women's doubles and mixed team events. In 2015, she participated at the Pan American Games in Toronto, Canada. She won the mixed doubles event at the Giraldilla International tournament in 2014 and 2017 with different partner.

== Achievements ==
=== Pan American Games ===
Women's singles
| Year | Venue | Opponent | Score | Result |
|---|---|---|---|---|
| 2023 | Olympic Training Center; Santiago, Chile | (United States) Jennie Gai | 20–22, 7–21 | Bronze |

=== Central American and Caribbean Games ===
Women's singles
| Year | Venue | Opponent | Score | Result |
|---|---|---|---|---|
| 2018 | Coliseo Universidad del Norte; Barranquilla, Colombia | (Mexico) Haramara Gaitán | 17–21, 17–21 | Silver |
| 2023 | Coliseo Complejo El Polvorín; San Salvador, El Salvador | (Mexico) Haramara Gaitán | 18–21, 14–21 | Silver |
| 2026 | Pabellón de Tenis de Mesa; Santo Domingo Este, Dominican Republic | (Mexico) Vanessa García | 15–21, 22–20, 21–15 | Gold |

Women's doubles
| Year | Venue | Partner | Opponent | Score | Result |
|---|---|---|---|---|---|
| 2014 | Omega Complex; Veracruz, Mexico | (Cuba) Adriana Artiz | (Mexico) Haramara Gaitán (Mexico) Sabrina Solis | 17–21, 6–21 | Bronze |
| 2018 | Coliseo Universidad del Norte; Barranquilla, Colombia | (Cuba) Yeily Ortiz | (Mexico) Haramara Gaitán (Mexico) Sabrina Solis | 21–15, 21–23, 21–17 | Gold |
| 2026 | Pabellón de Tenis de Mesa; Santo Domingo Este, Dominican Republic | (Cuba) Erly Cabrera | (Mexico) Romina Fregoso (Mexico) Miriam Rodríguez | 9–21, 8–21 | Silver |

Mixed doubles
| Year | Venue | Partner | Opponent | Score | Result |
|---|---|---|---|---|---|
| 2014 | Omega Complex; Veracruz, Mexico | (Cuba) Osleni Guerrero | (Mexico) Job Castillo (Mexico) Sabrina Solis | 16–21, 21–14, 21–13 | Gold |
| 2018 | Coliseo Universidad del Norte; Barranquilla, Colombia | (Cuba) Leodannis Martínez | (Cuba) Osleni Guerrero (Cuba) Adriana Artiz | 21–18, 17–21, 19–21 | Silver |
| 2026 | Pabellón de Tenis de Mesa; Santo Domingo Este, Dominican Republic | (Cuba) Roberto Herrera | (Guatemala) Christopher Martínez (Guatemala) Diana Corleto | 19–21, 10–21 | Bronze |

=== BWF International Challenge/Series (22 titles, 13 runners-up) ===
Women's singles
| Year | Tournament | Opponent | Score | Result |
|---|---|---|---|---|
| 2017 | Guatemala International | (Peru) Daniela Macías | 16–21, 20–22 | (silver) Runner-up |
| 2017 | Suriname International | (Peru) Fernanda Saponara | 21–19, 21–8 | (gold) Winner |
| 2018 | Giraldilla International | (United States) Crystal Pan | 6–21, 13–21 | (silver) Runner-up |
| 2018 | Peru International | (United States) Crystal Pan | 12–21, 16–21 | (silver) Runner-up |
| 2018 | International Mexicano | (United States) Jennie Gai | 13–21, 21–18, 21–19 | (gold) Winner |
| 2018 | Santo Domingo Open | (Brazil) Fabiana Silva | 19–21, 21–14, 13–21 | (silver) Runner-up |
| 2019 | Peru Future Series | (Indonesia) Ghaida Nurul Ghaniyu | 19–21, 21–14, 29–27 | (gold) Winner |
| 2019 | Peru International | (Indonesia) Ghaida Nurul Ghaniyu | 14–21, 14–21 | (silver) Runner-up |
| 2019 | Mexico Future Series | (Mexico) Mariana Ugalde | 21–9, 21–18 | (gold) Winner |
| 2024 | Giraldilla International | (Guatemala) Nikté Sotomayor | 21–14, 18–21, 21–11 | (gold) Winner |
| 2026 | Giraldilla International | (Malta) Francesca Clark | 21–7, 21–6 | (gold) Winner |

Women's doubles
| Year | Tournament | Partner | Opponent | Score | Result |
|---|---|---|---|---|---|
| 2018 | Giraldilla International | (Cuba) Thalía Mengana | (Cuba) Adriana Artiz (Cuba) Yeily Ortiz | 21–19, 19–21, 21–19 | (gold) Winner |
| 2019 | Mexico Future Series | (Cuba) Yeily Ortiz | (Guatemala) Diana Corleto (Guatemala) Nikté Sotomayor | 21–13, 21–18 | (gold) Winner |
| 2023 | Giraldilla International | (Cuba) Yeily Ortiz | (Guatemala) Alejandra Paiz (Guatemala) Mariana Paiz | 4–1 retired | (gold) Winner |
| 2024 | Giraldilla International | (Brazil) Fabiana Silva | (Guatemala) Diana Corleto (Guatemala) Mariana Paiz | 15–21, 21–19, 10–21 | (silver) Runner-up |
| 2025 | Giraldilla International | (Cuba) Leyanis Contreras | (Dominican Republic) Alissa Acosta (Dominican Republic) Daniela Acosta | 21–11, 21–9 | (gold) Winner |
| 2025 | Bolivia International | (Cuba) Leyanis Contreras | (Brazil) Luísa Bueno (Brazil) Maria Nascimento | 21–18, 21–17 | (gold) Winner |
| 2025 | Venezuela International | (Cuba) Leyanis Contreras | (Venezuela) Mariangel Garcia (Venezuela) Maria Rojas Camacho | 21–14, 21–17 | (gold) Winner |
| 2026 | Giraldilla International | (Cuba) Leyanis Contreras | (Dominican Republic) Clarisa Pie (Dominican Republic) Nairoby Abigail Jiménez | 10–21, 15–21 | (silver) Runner-up |
| 2026 | Cuba International | (Cuba) Leyanis Contreras | (Dominican Republic) Clarisa Pie (Dominican Republic) Nairoby Abigail Jiménez | 21–17, 13–21, 21–18 | (gold) Winner |

Mixed doubles
| Year | Tournament | Partner | Opponent | Score | Result |
|---|---|---|---|---|---|
| 2014 | Giraldilla International | (Cuba) Osleni Guerrero | (Peru) Andrés Corpancho (Peru) Luz María Zornoza | 21–16, 21–15 | (gold) Winner |
| 2017 | Giraldilla International | (Cuba) Leodannis Martínez | (Guatemala) Jonathan Solís (Guatemala) Mariana Paiz | 21–2, 21–13 | (gold) Winner |
| 2017 | Internacional Mexicano | (Cuba) Leodannis Martínez | (Peru) Daniel la Torre (Peru) Dánica Nishimura | 19–21, 19–21 | (silver) Runner-up |
| 2017 | Guatemala International | (Cuba) Leodannis Martínez | (Guatemala) Christopher Martínez (Guatemala) Diana Corleto | 17–21, 21–13, 21–11 | (gold) Winner |
| 2017 | Santo Domingo Open | (Cuba) Leodannis Martínez | (Cuba) Osleni Guerrero (Cuba) Adriana Artiz | 21–11, 13–21, 21–15 | (gold) Winner |
| 2017 | Suriname International | (Cuba) Leodannis Martínez | (Jamaica) Dennis Coke (Jamaica) Katherine Wynter | 21–16, 21–18 | (gold) Winner |
| 2018 | Jamaica International | (Cuba) Leodannis Martínez | (Cuba) Osleni Guerrero (Cuba) Yeily Ortiz | 20–22, 15–21 | (silver) Runner-up |
| 2018 | Giraldilla International | (Cuba) Leodannis Martínez | (Cuba) Osleni Guerrero (Cuba) Adriana Artiz | 13–21, 21–13, 19–21 | (silver) Runner-up |
| 2018 | Peru International | (Cuba) Leodannis Martínez | (Brazil) Artur Pomoceno (Brazil) Fabiana Silva | 24–26, 21–15, 8–21 | (silver) Runner-up |
| 2018 | Guatemala International | (Cuba) Leodannis Martínez | (Canada) Joshua Hurlburt-Yu (Canada) Josephine Wu | 12–21, 18–21 | (silver) Runner-up |
| 2019 | Peru Future Series | (Cuba) Osleni Guerrero | (United States) Vinson Chiu (United States) Breanna Chi | 20–22, 9–21 | (silver) Runner-up |
| 2019 | Mexico Future Series | (Cuba) Osleni Guerrero | (Mexico) Luis Montoya (Mexico) Vanessa Villalobos | 22–20, 15–21, 21–16 | (gold) Winner |
| 2025 | Venezuela International | (Cuba) Roberto Herrera | (Venezuela) Ricardo Torres (Venezuela) Mariangel Garcia | 21–10, 21–9 | (gold) Winner |
| 2026 | Giraldilla International | (Cuba) Roberto Herrera | (Dominican Republic) Yonatan Linarez (Dominican Republic) Nairoby Abigail Jiménez | 26–24, 21–14 | (gold) Winner |
| 2026 | Cuba International | (Cuba) Roberto Herrera | (Mexico) Juan Pablo Montoya (Mexico) Cecilia Madera | 21–18, 21–11 | (gold) Winner |

BWF International Challenge tournament
BWF International Series tournament
BWF Future Series tournament
