= Aruba national badminton team =

National badminton team representing Aruba

Aruba
- Association: Aruba Badminton Federation (ABF)
- Confederation: BPA (Pan America)
- President: Terence Sybesma

BWF ranking
- Current ranking: Unranked (2 April 2024)
- Highest ranking: 105 (6 April 2017)

The Aruba national badminton team (Dutch: Arubaans badmintonteam; Papiamento: Grupo nashonal di bádminton di Aruba) represents Aruba in international badminton team competitions and is controlled by the Aruba Badminton Federation which is affiliated with Badminton Pan America and the Caribbean Regional Badminton Confederation (CAREBACO). The team first competed in their first international team tournament in 1990.

The team first made its appearance at the CAREBACO Team Championships in 1974. The team also competed in the 1990 Central American and Caribbean Games, where badminton was first inaugurated in the Games. The Aruban junior team competed in the 2009 Pan Am Junior Team Championships and finished in 12th place.

== History ==
=== Mixed team ===
Aruba made their debut in the CAREBACO Team Championships in 1974. The team placed fifth in the final rankings, losing 7–0 to Jamaica, Suriname, Trinidad and Tobago and Guyana.

== Competitive record ==
The following tables show the Aruba national badminton team's competitive record in international tournaments.

Key

CH	RU	3rd	SF	4th	QF	#R	GS	Q#	#th	A	NH	WDN	DNQ

(CH) champion; (RU) runners-up; (3rd) third place; (SF) semi-finalists; (4th) fourth place; (QF) quarter-finalist; (#R) rounds 4, 3, 2, 1; (#th) places 5, 6...; (GS) group stage; (Q#) qualification round; (A) absent; (NH) not held; (WDN) withdrawn; (DNQ) did not qualify.

=== Thomas Cup ===
Year	1949	1952	1955	1958	1961	1964	1967	1970	1973	1976
Result	Part of the Netherlands		Part of the Netherlands Antilles							
Year	1979	1982	1984	1986	1988	1990	1992	1994	1996	1998
Result	Part of the Netherlands Antilles			A						
Year	2000	2002	2004	2006	2008	2010	2012	2014	2016	2018
Result	A									
Year	2020	2022	2024	2026	2028	2030	2032	2034	2036	2038
Result	A			TBD						

=== Uber Cup ===
Year	1950–1953			1957	1960	1963	1966	1969	1972	1975
Result	NH			Part of the Netherlands Antilles						
Year	1978	1981	1984	1986	1988	1990	1992	1994	1996	1998
Result	Part of the Netherlands Antilles			A						
Year	2000	2002	2004	2006	2008	2010	2012	2014	2016	2018
Result	A									
Year	2020	2022	2024	2026	2028	2030	2032	2034	2036	2038
Result	A			TBD						

=== Sudirman Cup ===
Year	1989	1991	1993	1995	1997	1999	2001	2003	2005	2007
Result	A									
Year	2009	2011	2013	2015	2017	2019	2021	2023	2025	2027
Result	A									TBD

=== Pan American Team Championships ===
==== Men's team ====
Year	2016	2018	2020	2022	2024	2026	2028	2030	2032	2034
Result	A					TBD				
Year	2036	2038	2040	2042	2044	2046	2048	2050	2052	2054
Result	TBD									

==== Women's team ====
Year	2016	2018	2020	2022	2024	2026	2028	2030	2032	2034
Result	A					TBD				
Year	2036	2038	2040	2042	2044	2046	2048	2050	2052	2054
Result	TBD									

==== Mixed team ====
Year	1977	1978	1979	1980	1987	1989	1991	1993	1997	2001
Result	Part of the Netherlands Antilles				A					
Year	2004	2005	2007	2008	2009	2010	2012	2013	2014	2016
Result	A									
Year	2017	2019	2023	2025	2027	2029	2031	2033	2035	2037
Result	A			TBD						

=== Central American and Caribbean Games ===
==== Men's team ====
Year	2010
Result	A

==== Women's team ====
Year	2010
Result	A

==== Mixed team ====
Year	1990	1993	2006	2014	2018	2023
Result	GS	A				

=== Caribbean Team Championships (CAREBACO) ===
==== Mixed team ====
Year	1972	1973	1974	1975	1976	1978	1979	1980	1981	1982
Result	A		5th	5th	6th	7th	5th	5th	5th	5th
Year	1983	1984	1985	1986	1987	1990	1992	1993	1995	1996
Result	5th	5th	5th	A		4th	A			
Year	1997	1998	1999	2000	2001	2002	2003	2004	2005	2011
Result	A									
Year	2012	2014	2015	2016	2017	2018	2025	2026	2027	2028
Result	A						TBD			

**Red border color indicates tournament was held on home soil.

== Junior competitive record ==
=== Suhandinata Cup ===
Year	2000	2002	2004	2006	2007	2008	2009	2010	2011	2013
Result	A									
Year	2014	2015	2016	2017	2018	2019	2022	2023	2024	2025
Result	A									TBD

=== Pan American Junior Team Championships ===
==== Mixed team ====
Year	1977	1980	1981	1988	1990	1991	1992	1994	1996	1998
Result	Part of the Netherlands Antilles			A						
Year	2000	2002	2004	2006	2007	2008	2009	2010	2011	2012
Result	A						GS	A		
Year	2013	2014	2015	2016	2017	2018	2019	2021	2022	2023
Result	A									
Year	2024	2025	2026	2027	2028	2029	2030	2031	2032	2033
Result	A	TBD								

=== Caribbean Junior Team Championships (CAREBACO) ===
==== Mixed team ====
Year	1976	1978	1979	1980	1981	1982	1983	1984	1985	1986
Result	A									
Year	1987	1988	1990	1992	1993	1995	1996	1997	1998	1999
Result	A									
Year	2000	2001	2002	2004	2005	2007	2011	2012	2013	2014
Result	A									
Year	2015	2016	2017	2025	2026	2027	2028	2029	2030	2031
Result	A	GS	A	TBD						

**Red border color indicates tournament was held on home soil.

== Staff ==
The following list shows the coaching staff for the Aruba national badminton team.

Name	Role
(Aruba) Su-ying Lau	Coach

== Players ==
=== Current squad ===
As of 2 January 2024

==== Men's team ====
Name	DoB/Age	Ranking of event		
Name	DoB/Age	MS	MD	XD
Junjie Feng	1 June 1998 (age 28)	-	-	-
Jonah Arthur Tromp	23 July 1997 (age 29)	-	-	-
Kevin Dijkhoff	3 September 1994 (age 32)	-	-	-
Mackie Lu	26 August 2001 (age 25)	-	-	-

==== Women's team ====
Name	DoB/Age	Ranking of event		
Name	DoB/Age	WS	WD	XD
Leyenne Schairer	18 June 2003 (age 23)	-	-	-
Cristle Nieuw	22 January 1998 (age 28)	-	-	-
Thirsa van der Linden	4 September 2000 (age 26)	-	-	-

=== Previous squads ===
==== Central American and Caribbean Games ====
- Mixed team: 1990
