= Barbados national badminton team =

National badminton team representing Barbados

Barbados
- Association: Barbados Badminton Association (BBA)
- Confederation: BPA (Pan America)
- President: Kevin Wood

BWF ranking
- Current ranking: 101 ▼8 (2 January 2024)
- Highest ranking: 56 (4 July 2013)

Pan Am Mixed Team Championships
- Appearances: 5 (first in 1993)
- Best result: Group stage

Pan Am Men's Team Championships
- Appearances: 2 (first in 2012)
- Best result: Group stage

Pan Am Women's Team Championships
- Appearances: 2 (first in 2004)
- Best result: Fourth place (2012)

The Barbados national badminton team represents Barbados in international badminton team competitions. The national team is managed by the Barbados Badminton Association in Bridgetown. Barbados have never medaled at the Pan American Badminton Championships. The Barbadian mixed team started participating in the Commonwealth Games mixed team event since 2010.

== History ==
The national team was formed after the formation of the Barbados Badminton Association in 1983. The national team then competed in the Carebaco International tournaments organized by the Caribbean Regional Badminton Confederation (CAREBACO).

=== Men's team ===
The Barbadian men's team competed in the 1994 Thomas Cup qualifiers. The team were placed into Group C with Iceland, Spain and Bulgaria. The team lost all of their matches to all three teams in the group.

In 2010, the team competed in the 2012 Thomas Cup Preliminaries but were eliminated in the group stages. The team then competed in the 2018 Pan Am Badminton Championships. The team were grouped with Canada and Peru. The team lost 5–0 to both teams and placed 6th in the final standings after losing 3–0 to Dominican Republic in the fifth place tie.

=== Women's team ===
The Barbadian women's team took part in qualifying for the 2002 Uber Cup. The team finished at the bottom of the group after losing 5–0 against the United States, Italy and Cuba. In 2012, the team competed in the 2012 Uber Cup Preliminaries. Although the team did not qualify for the 2012 Uber Cup, they managed to win 3–2 against Puerto Rico to finish 4th in the tournament.

=== Mixed team ===
Barbados first competed in the 1990 CAREBACO Team Championships and finished as runners-up after almost beating Trinidad and Tobago in the final.

In 2009, the Barbadian team lost against the United States but won 3–1 against Dominican Republic to place 6th at the 2009 Pan Am Badminton Championships. In 2010, the team debuted in the Commonwealth Games team event. The team were eliminated in the group stages but won 4–1 against Kenya in the group. In 2018, the team made history by winning the CAREBACO Team Championships after defeating Suriname 3–1 in the final. The team competed in the 2022 Commonwealth Games. The team won a match against Mauritius when Shae Martin and Sabrina Scott defeated Tejraj Pultoo and Kobita Dookhee 21–17, 16–21, 21–19.

== Competitive record ==
=== Thomas Cup ===
Year	Round	Pos
1949 to 1964	Part of the United Kingdom	
1967 to 1992	Did not enter	
1994	Did not qualify	
1996	Did not enter	
1998	Did not enter	
2000	Did not enter	
2002	Did not qualify	
2004	Did not qualify	
2006	Did not enter	
2008	Did not enter	
2010	Did not enter	
2012	Did not qualify	
2014	Did not enter	
2016	Did not enter	
2018	Did not qualify	
2020	Did not enter	
2022	Did not enter	
2024	Did not enter	
2026	To be determined	
2028	To be determined	
2030	To be determined	

=== Uber Cup ===
Year	Round	Pos
1957 to 1966	Part of the United Kingdom	
1969 to 2000	Did not enter	
2002	Did not qualify	
2004	Did not qualify	
2006	Did not enter	
2008	Did not enter	
2010	Did not enter	
2012	Did not qualify	
2014	Did not enter	
2016	Did not enter	
2018	Did not enter	
2020	Did not enter	
2022	Did not enter	
2024	Did not enter	
2026	To be determined	
2028	To be determined	
2030	To be determined	

=== Sudirman Cup ===
Year	Round	Pos
1989 to 2023	Did not enter	
2025	To be determined	
2027	To be determined	
2029	To be determined	

=== Commonwealth Games ===
==== Men's team ====
Year	Round	Pos
1998	Did not enter	

==== Women's team ====
Year	Round	Pos
1998	Did not enter	

==== Mixed team ====
Year	Round	Pos
1978	Did not enter	
1982	Did not enter	
1986	Did not enter	
1990	Did not enter	
1994	Did not enter	
2002	Group stage	
2006	Did not enter	
2010	Group stage	
2014	Group stage	
2018	Group stage	
2022	Group stage	
2026	To be determined	

=== Pan American Team Championships ===
==== Men's team ====
Year	Round	Pos
2016	Did not enter	
2018	Group stage	6th
2020	Did not enter	
2022	Did not enter	
2024	Did not enter	
2026	To be determined	
2028	To be determined	
2030	To be determined	

==== Women's team ====
Year	Round	Pos
2016	Did not enter	
2018	Did not enter	
2020	Did not enter	
2022	Did not enter	
2024	Did not enter	
2026	To be determined	
2028	To be determined	
2030	To be determined	

==== Mixed team ====
Year	Round	Pos
1977	Did not enter	
1978	Did not enter	
1979	Did not enter	
1980	Did not enter	
1987	Did not enter	
1989	Did not enter	
1991	Group stage	7th
1993	Did not enter	
1997	Group stage	8th
2001	Did not enter	
2004	Did not enter	
2005	Group stage	5th
2007	Did not enter	
2008	Did not enter	
2009	Group stage	6th
2010	Did not enter	
2012	Did not enter	
2013	Did not enter	
2014	Did not enter	
2016	Did not enter	
2017	Did not enter	
2019	Did not enter	
2023	Did not enter	
2025	To be determined	
2027	To be determined	
2029	To be determined	

=== Central American and Caribbean Games ===
==== Men's team ====
Year	Round	Pos
2010	Group stage	

==== Women's team ====
Year	Round	Pos
2010	Group stage	

==== Mixed team ====
Year	Round	Pos
1990	Group stage	
1993	Did not enter	
2006	Did not enter	
2014	Group stage	
2018	Group stage	
2023	Did not enter	

=== CAREBACO Team Championships ===
==== Mixed team ====
Year	Round	Pos
1972 to 1983	Did not enter	
1984	Fourth place	4th
1985	Fourth place	4th
1986	Third place	3rd
1987	Third place	3rd
1990	Runners-up	2nd
1992	Third place	3rd
1993	Third place	3rd
1995	Fourth place	4th
1996	Fourth place	4th
1997	Runners-up	2nd
1998	Fourth place	4th
1999	Fourth place	4th
2000	Fourth place	4th
2001	Fourth place	4th
2002	Fourth place	4th
2003	Runners-up	2nd
2004	Third place	3rd
2005	Runners-up	2nd
2011	Runners-up	2nd
2012	Third place	3rd
2014	Third place	3rd
2015	3rd / 4th in group	4th
2016	Fourth place	4th
2017	Third place	3rd
2018	Champions	1st

**Red border color indicates tournament was held on home soil.

== Junior competitive record ==
=== Suhandinata Cup ===
Year	Round	Pos
2000 to 2024	Did not enter	
2025	To be determined	

=== Pan American Junior Team Championships ===
==== Mixed team ====
Year	Round	Pos
1977	Did not enter	
1980	Did not enter	
1981	Did not enter	
1988	Did not enter	
1990	Did not enter	
1991	Did not enter	
1992	Did not enter	
1994	Did not enter	
1996	Did not enter	
1998	Did not enter	
2000	Did not enter	
2002	Did not enter	
2004	Group stage	11th
2006	Did not enter	
2007	Did not enter	
2008	Did not enter	
2009	Group stage	8th
2010	Did not enter	
2011	Group stage	8th
2012	Group stage	7th
2013	Did not enter	
2014	Did not enter	
2015	Did not enter	
2016	Did not enter	
2017	Did not enter	
2018	Did not enter	
2019	Did not enter	
2021	Did not enter	
2022	Did not enter	
2023	Did not enter	
2024	Group stage	7th
2025	Group stage	11th

=== CAREBACO Junior Team Championships ===
==== Mixed team ====
Year	Round	Pos
1976 to 1982	Did not enter	
1984	Fifth place	5th
1985	Third place	3rd
1986	Fourth place	4th
1987	Fifth place	5th
1988	Did not enter	
1990	Fourth place	4th
1992	Third place	3rd
1993	Runners-up	2nd
1995	Runners-up	2nd
1996	Champions	1st
1997	Third place	3rd
1998	Did not enter	
1999	Third place	3rd
2000	Fourth place	4th
2001	Fourth place	4th
2002	Fourth place	4th
2004	Fourth place	4th
2005	Fourth place	4th
2007	Fourth place	4th
2011	Third place	3rd
2012	Fourth place	4th
2013	Fifth place	5th
2014	Third place	3rd
2015	3rd / 4th in group	4th
2016	Fourth place	4th
2017	Fourth place	4th

**Red border color indicates tournament was held on home soil.

== Staff ==
The following list shows the coaching staff for the Barbados national badminton team.

Name	Role
(Barbados) Shakeira Waithe	Head coach
(Barbados) Mariama Eastmond	Coach

== Players ==
=== Current squad ===
As of 2 January 2024

==== Men's team ====
Name	DoB/Age	Ranking of event		
Name	DoB/Age	MS	MD	XD
Kennie King	7 June 2002 (age 23)	409	-	633
Shae Martin	21 September 1999 (age 25)	-	-	-
Gavin Robinson	13 October 2000 (age 24)	-	-	-
Ziyad Mehter	17 February 2006 (age 19)	-	-	-

==== Women's team ====
Name	DoB/Age	Ranking of event		
Name	DoB/Age	WS	WD	XD
Shari Hope	3 April 1986 (age 39)	-	-	633
Sabrina Scott	24 February 1986 (age 39)	722	766	633
Monyata Riviera	14 May 1994 (age 31)	586	-	633
Eboni Atherley	13 September 2006 (age 18)	-	-	-
