= Puerto Rico national badminton team =

National badminton team representing Puerto Rico

Puerto Rico
- Association: Federación de Bádminton de Puerto Rico (FBPR)
- Confederation: BPA (Pan America)
- President: Carlos Maldonado González

BWF ranking
- Current ranking: Unranked (2 April 2024)
- Highest ranking: 54 (5 July 2012)

Pan Am Mixed Team Championships
- Appearances: 1 (first in 2007)
- Best result: Group stage

The Puerto Rico national badminton team (Spanish: Selección nacional de bádminton de Puerto Rico) represents Puerto Rico in international badminton team competitions. It is controlled by the Badminton Federation of Puerto Rico (FBPR; Federación de Bádminton de Puerto Rico). The team is part of Badminton Pan America and the Caribbean Regional Badminton Confederation (CAREBACO).

The team competes in the CAREBACO Team Championships. The team also competes in the Central American and Caribbean Games and won a silver medal in the women's team event in 2010.

== History ==
=== Men's team ===
In 2006, the team competed in the 2006 Pan American Thomas Cup Preliminaries. The team did not advance further losing to Guatemala, Mexico and the United States in the group stage. In February 2010, the team competed in the 2006 Pan American Thomas Cup Preliminaries. The team were eliminated in the group stages after losing to Guatemala, Jamaica and the United States but won their first tie when they defeated Colombia 5–0. In July 2010, the team competed in the 2010 Central American and Caribbean Games men's team event while it was also the host. The team did not advance to the knockouts after losing 5–0 to Guatemala and 3–2 to Trinidad and Tobago.

=== Women's team ===
The team took part in qualifying for the Uber Cup in 2010. The team lost to Canada, Mexico and Jamaica but won against Colombia to finish fourth in their qualifying group. In that same year, the team also competed in the 2010 Central American and Caribbean Games women's team event. The team defeated the Dominican Republic in the semi-finals but lost to Mexico in the final to clinch silver.

=== Mixed team ===
In 2002, Puerto Rico hosted the 2002 CAREBACO Team Championships. The team finished third in the championships. In 2007, the team competed in the 2007 Pan Am Mixed Team Championships but did not advance to the semi-finals.

== Competitive record ==
=== Thomas Cup ===
Year	Round	Pos
1949 to 2000	Did not enter	
2002	Did not qualify	
2004	Did not enter	
2006	Did not qualify	
2008	Did not enter	
2010	Did not qualify	
2012	Did not qualify	
2014	Did not enter	
2016	Did not enter	
2018	Did not enter	
2020	Did not enter	
2022	Did not enter	
2024	Did not enter	
2026	To be determined	
2028	To be determined	
2030	To be determined	

=== Uber Cup ===
Year	Round	Pos
1957 to 2008	Did not enter	
2010	Did not qualify	
2012	Did not qualify	
2014	Did not enter	
2016	Did not enter	
2018	Did not enter	
2020	Did not enter	
2022	Did not enter	
2024	Did not enter	
2026	To be determined	
2028	To be determined	
2030	To be determined	

=== Sudirman Cup ===
Year	Round	Pos
1989 to 2023	Did not enter	
2025	To be determined	
2027	To be determined	
2029	To be determined	

=== Pan American Team Championships ===
==== Men's team ====
Year	Round	Pos
2016 to 2024	Did not enter	
2026	To be determined	
2028	To be determined	
2030	To be determined	

==== Women's team ====
Year	Round	Pos
2016 to 2024	Did not enter	
2026	To be determined	
2028	To be determined	
2030	To be determined	

==== Mixed team ====
Year	Round	Pos
1977 to 2005	Did not enter	
2007	Group stage	8th
2008	Did not enter	
2009	Did not enter	
2010	Did not enter	
2012	Did not enter	
2013	Did not enter	
2014	Did not enter	
2016	Did not enter	
2017	Did not enter	
2019	Did not enter	
2023	Did not enter	
2025	To be determined	
2027	To be determined	
2029	To be determined	

=== Central American and Caribbean Games ===
==== Men's team ====
Year	Round	Pos
2010	Group stage	

==== Women's team ====
Year	Round	Pos
2010	Runners-up	2nd

==== Mixed team ====
Year	Round	Pos
1990	Did not enter	
1993	Did not enter	
2006	Did not enter	
2014	Did not enter	
2018	Did not enter	
2023	Did not enter	

=== CAREBACO Team Championships ===
==== Mixed team ====
Year	Round	Pos
1972 to 1993	Did not enter	
1995	Fifth place	5th
1996	Did not enter	
1997	Did not enter	
1998	Fifth place	5th
1999	Did not enter	
2000	Did not enter	
2001	Did not enter	
2002	Third place	3rd
2003	Did not enter	
2004	Did not enter	
2005	Did not enter	
2011	Did not enter	
2012	Did not enter	
2014	Did not enter	
2015	Did not enter	
2016	Did not enter	
2017	Did not enter	
2018	Did not enter	

**Red border color indicates tournament was held on home soil.

== Junior competitive record ==
=== Suhandinata Cup ===
Year	Round	Pos
2000	Did not enter	
2002	Did not enter	
2004	Did not enter	
2006	Did not enter	
2007	Group stage	25th
2008	Did not enter	
2009	Did not enter	
2010	Group stage	22nd
2011	Did not enter	
2012	Did not enter	
2013	Did not enter	
2014	Did not enter	
2015	Did not enter	
2016	Did not enter	
2017	Did not enter	
2018	Did not enter	
2019	Did not enter	
2022	Did not enter	
2023	Did not enter	
2024	Did not enter	
2025	To be determined	

=== Pan American Junior Team Championships ===
==== Mixed team ====
Year	Round	Pos
1977 to 1994	Did not enter	
1996	Group stage	7th
1998	Did not enter	
2000	Did not enter	
2002	Did not enter	
2004	Group stage	9th
2006	Group stage	
2007	Group stage	9th
2008	Group stage	10th
2009	Group stage	6th
2010	Group stage	5th
2011	Group stage	7th
2012	Did not enter	
2013	Quarter-finals	
2014	Did not enter	
2015	Did not enter	
2016	Did not enter	
2017	Did not enter	
2018	Did not enter	
2019	Did not enter	
2021	Did not enter	
2022	Did not enter	
2023	Did not enter	
2024	To be determined	

=== CAREBACO Junior Team Championships ===
==== Mixed team ====
Year	Round	Pos
1976 to 2001	Did not enter	
2002	Group stage	5th
2004	Group stage	5th
2005	Group stage	6th
2007	Did not enter	
2011	Champions	1st
2012	Champions	1st
2013	Champions	1st
2014	Did not enter	
2015	Did not enter	
2016	Did not enter	
2017	Did not enter	

**Red border color indicates tournament was held on home soil.

== Players ==
=== Current squad ===
As of 2 January 2024

==== Men's team ====
Name	DoB/Age	Ranking of event		
Name	DoB/Age	MS	MD	XD
Joshua Soler Román	10 August 1999 (age 26)	-	-	-
Luis Pérez Justiniano	8 August 2000 (age 25)	-	-	-
Raynaldo Vargas Carmenatty	31 August 2000 (age 25)	-	-	-
Pedro Zapata	21 April 1996 (age 29)	-	-	-

==== Women's team ====
Name	DoB/Age	Ranking of event		
Name	DoB/Age	WS	WD	XD
Génesis Valentín	20 March 1998 (age 27)	-	-	-
Saribel Cáceres	14 September 1996 (age 29)	-	-	-
Vitmary Rivera Rodriguez	6 February 1999 (age 27)	-	-	-
Yuneyshka Guzmán Rosa	3 November 2000 (age 25)	-	-	-
