= Daigenis Saturria =

Dominican Republic badminton player (born 1990)

Personal information
- Born: Daigenis Mercedes Saturria; 2 August 1990 (age 36)
- Height: 1.65 m (5 ft 5 in)
- Weight: 59 kg (130 lb)

Sport
- Country: Dominican Republic
- Sport: Badminton

Women's singles & doubles
- Highest ranking: 178 (WS 29 January 2015); 98 (WD 19 June 2014; 83 (XD 21 November 2013)
- BWF profile

Daigenis Mercedes Saturria (born 2 August 1990) is a Dominican Republic badminton player. In 2013, she won the Carebaco International tournament in the women's doubles event partnered with Berónica Vibieca. In 2015, she also won the Carebaco International tournament in the women's and mixed doubles event and became the runner-up in the women's singles event. She competed at the 2015 Pan Am Games in Toronto, Canada.

== Achievements ==
=== BWF International Challenge/Series ===
Women's singles
Year	Tournament	Opponent	Score	Result
2015	Carebaco International	(Trinidad and Tobago) Solángel Guzmán	9–21, 11–21	(silver) Runner-up

Women's doubles
Year	Tournament	Partner	Opponent	Score	Result
2013	Venezuela International	(Dominican Republic) Berónica Vibieca	(Guatemala) Ana Lucia de León (Guatemala) Nikté Sotomayor	22–24, 18–21	(silver) Runner-up
2013	Guatemala International	(Dominican Republic) Berónica Vibieca	(Guatemala) Krisley López (Guatemala) Nikté Sotomayor	18–21, 19–21	(silver) Runner-up
2013	Carebaco International	(Dominican Republic) Berónica Vibieca	(Puerto Rico) Saribel Cáceres (Puerto Rico) Génesis Valentín	21–18, 21–12	(gold) Winner
2014	Santo Domingo Open	(Dominican Republic) Berónica Vibieca	(Peru) Daniela Macías (Peru) Dánica Nishimura	21–14, 18–21, 16–21	(silver) Runner-up
2015	Carebaco International	(Dominican Republic) Licelott Sánchez	(Trinidad and Tobago) Leanna Castanada (Trinidad and Tobago) Avril Plaza Marcelle	21–10, 21–13	(gold) Winner

Mixed doubles
Year	Tournament	Partner	Opponent	Score	Result
2015	Carebaco International	(Dominican Republic) Nelson Javier	(Jamaica) Gareth Henry (Jamaica) Katherine Wynter	21–17, 21–19	(gold) Winner

BWF International Challenge tournament
BWF International Series tournament
BWF Future Series tournament
