= Ana Lucia de León =

Guatemalan badminton player (born 1991)

Personal information
- Born: Ana Lucia de León; 24 June 1991 (age 35)

Sport
- Country: Guatemala
- Sport: Badminton

Women's singles & doubles
- Highest ranking: 132 (WS 19 September 2013); 154 (WD 19 June 2014); 155 (XD 18 October 2012)
- BWF profile
Medal record
Women's badminton
Representing Guatemala
Central American and Caribbean Games
Gold medal – first place	2014 Veracruz	Mixed team

Ana Lucia de León (born 24 June 1991) is a Guatemalan badminton player.

== Achievements ==
=== BWF International Challenge/Series ===
Women's singles
Year	Tournament	Opponent	Score	Result
2013	Carebaco International	(Guatemala) Nikté Sotomayor	10-21, 16–21	(silver) Runner-up
2013	Venezuela International	(Trinidad and Tobago) Solangel Guzman	14-21, 4-21	(silver) Runner-up
2012	Guatemala International	(Guatemala) Nikté Sotomayor	16-21, 18–21	(silver) Runner-up

Women's doubles
Year	Tournament	Partner	Opponent	Score	Result
2013	Venezuela International	(Guatemala) Nikté Sotomayor	(Dominican Republic) Beronica Vibieca (Dominican Republic) Daigenis Saturria	24–22, 21–18	(gold) Winner
2012	Guatemala International	(Guatemala) Nikté Sotomayor	(Guatemala) Melanie Braeuner (Guatemala) Adriana Cojulún	21–11, 21–8	(gold) Winner

Mixed doubles
Year	Tournament	Partner	Opponent	Score	Result
2012	Guatemala International	(Guatemala) Jonathan Solis	(Guatemala) Anibal Marroquin (Guatemala) Nikté Sotomayor	21-13, 14–21, 19–21	(silver) Runner-up

BWF International Challenge tournament
BWF International Series tournament
BWF Future Series tournament
