= Trinidad and Tobago national badminton team =

National badminton team representing Trinidad and Tobago

Trinidad and Tobago
- Association: Trinidad & Tobago Badminton Association (TTBA)
- Confederation: BPA (Pan America)
- President: Chandrika Ramsubhag

BWF ranking
- Current ranking: 84 ▼1 (2 April 2023)
- Highest ranking: 55 (16 October 2014)

Pan Am Mixed Team Championships
- Appearances: 6 (first in 1987)
- Best result: Group stage

Pan Am Men's Team Championships
- Appearances: 1 (first in 2018)
- Best result: Group stage

Pan Am Women's Team Championships
- Appearances: 1 (first in 2018)
- Best result: Group stage

The Trinidad and Tobago national badminton team represents Trinidad and Tobago in international badminton team competitions. It is managed by the Trinidad & Tobago Badminton Association. The team is affiliated to Badminton Pan America and the Caribbean Regional Badminton Confederation (CAREBACO).

Trinidad and Tobago made their first appearance at the Pan Am Mixed Team Championships in 1987. The Team debuted in the Pan American Men's and Women's Team Championships in 2018, when it qualified as the hosts. The team also competes in the CAREBACO Team Championships and have won the Caribbean team title in 1990, 2003, 2004 and 2005.

== History ==
=== Men's team ===
In 1998, Trinidad and Tobago competed in the 1998 Commonwealth Games men's team event. Drawn into Group C with Australia, Wales and Fiji, the team lost to Australia and Wales placed third in their group after defeating Fiji. From 2002 to 2006, the team took part in qualifying for the Thomas Cup but were eliminated in the group stages. In 2010, the team won bronze at the 2010 Central American and Caribbean Games.

In 2018, the team entered the 2018 Pan Am Men's Team Championships as hosts. The team did not advance to the knockout stages, as they were eliminated in their group after losing to the United States, Jamaica and the Dominican Republic.

=== Women's team ===
In the 1998 Commonwealth Games women's team event, the team failed to advance to the knockout stage after placing last in their group. In 2006, the team competed in the 2006 Pan American Thomas & Uber Cup Preliminaries. The team were eliminated in the group stages after finishing last in their group.

In 2010, the team competed in the 2010 Central American and Caribbean Games but failed to advance to the knockouts. In 2018, the team competed in the 2018 Pan Am Women's Team Championships but were eliminated early after losing 5–0 to the United States and Guatemala.

=== Mixed team ===
In 1972, the team competed in the inaugural CAREBACO Team Championships in Kingston, Jamaica. The team finished fourth in the tournament after losing to Jamaica, Guyana and Suriname. In 1987, the team competed in the 1987 Pan Am Badminton Championships. The team were given a tough challenge as they were drawn into Group B with favorites Canada and the United States. The team lost 5–0 to both teams in the group. The team competed in the Pan Am Championships again in 1989 but still could not advance to the knockouts. In 1990, the team finished third at the 1990 Central American and Caribbean Games.

In 2006, the team competed in the 2006 Commonwealth Games for the first time. The team were eliminated in the group stages. In that same year, the team competed in the Central American and Caribbean Games and also failed to get past the group stages. In 2007, the team competed in the 2007 Pan Am Badminton Championships but did not advance further. In 2017, the team withdrew from the Pan Am Championships.

== Competitive record ==
=== Thomas Cup ===
Year	Round	Pos
1949 to 1961	Part of the United Kingdom	
1964 to 2000	Did not enter	
2002	Did not qualify	
2004	Did not qualify	
2006	Did not qualify	
2008	Did not enter	
2010	Did not enter	
2012	Did not enter	
2014	Did not qualify	
2016	Did not enter	
2018	Did not qualify	
2020	Did not enter	
2022	Did not enter	
2024	Did not enter	
2026	To be determined	
2028	To be determined	
2030	To be determined	

=== Uber Cup ===
Year	Round	Pos
1957	Part of the United Kingdom	
1960	Part of the United Kingdom	
1963 to 2000	Did not enter	
2002	Did not qualify	
2004	Did not enter	
2006	Did not qualify	
2008	Did not enter	
2010	Did not enter	
2012	Did not enter	
2014	Did not enter	
2016	Did not enter	
2018	Did not qualify	
2020	Did not enter	
2022	Did not enter	
2024	Did not enter	
2026	To be determined	
2028	To be determined	
2030	To be determined	

=== Sudirman Cup ===
Year	Round	Pos
1989 to 2023	Did not enter	
2025	To be determined	
2027	To be determined	
2029	To be determined	

=== Commonwealth Games ===
==== Men's team ====
Year	Round	Pos
1998	Group stage	

==== Women's team ====
Year	Round	Pos
1998	Group stage	

==== Mixed team ====
Year	Round	Pos
1978	Did not enter	
1982	Did not enter	
1986	Did not enter	
1990	Did not enter	
1994	Did not enter	
2002	Did not enter	
2006	Group stage	
2010	Did not enter	
2014	Did not enter	
2018	Did not enter	
2022	Did not enter	
2026	To be determined	

=== Pan American Team Championships ===
==== Men's team ====
Year	Round	Pos
2016	Did not enter	
2018	Group stage	7th
2020	Did not enter	
2022	Did not enter	
2024	Did not enter	
2026	To be determined	
2028	To be determined	
2030	To be determined	

==== Women's team ====
Year	Round	Pos
2016	Did not enter	
2018	Group stage	5th
2020	Did not enter	
2022	Did not enter	
2024	Did not enter	
2026	To be determined	
2028	To be determined	
2030	To be determined	

==== Mixed team ====
Year	Round	Pos
1977	Did not enter	
1978	Did not enter	
1979	Did not enter	
1980	Did not enter	
1987	Group stage	6th
1989	Group stage	6th
1991	Group stage	8th
1993	Did not enter	
1997	Group stage	7th
2001	Did not enter	
2004	Did not enter	
2005	Group stage	6th
2007	Group stage	7th
2008	Did not enter	
2009	Did not enter	
2010	Did not enter	
2012	Did not enter	
2013	Did not enter	
2014	Did not enter	
2016	Did not enter	
2017	Withdrew	
2019	Did not enter	
2023	Did not enter	
2025	To be determined	
2027	To be determined	
2029	To be determined	

=== Central American and Caribbean Games ===
==== Men's team ====
Year	Round	Pos
2010	Semi-finals	4th

==== Women's team ====
Year	Round	Pos
2010	Group stage	

==== Mixed team ====
Year	Round	Pos
1990	Third place	3rd
1993	Did not enter	
2006	Group stage	
2014	Group stage	
2018	Did not enter	
2023	Did not enter	

=== CAREBACO Team Championships ===
==== Mixed team ====
Year	Round	Pos
1972	Fourth place	4th
1973	Third place	3rd
1974	Third place	3rd
1975	Fourth place	4th
1976	Fourth place	4th
1978	Third place	3rd
1979	Third place	3rd
1980	Fourth place	4th
1981	Third place	3rd
1982	Third place	3rd
1983	Runners-up	2nd
1984	Runners-up	2nd
1985	Runners-up	2nd
1986	Runners-up	2nd
1987	Runners-up	2nd
1990	Champions	1st
1992	Runners-up	2nd
1993	Runners-up	2nd
1995	Runners-up	2nd
1996	Third place	3rd
1997	Third place	3rd
1998	Did not enter	
1999	Runners-up	2nd
2001	Runners-up	2nd
2002	Runners-up	2nd
2003	Champions	1st
2004	Champions	1st
2005	Champions	1st
2011	Did not enter	
2012	Did not enter	
2014	Did not enter	
2015	3rd / 4th in group	3rd
2016	Third place	3rd
2017	Fourth place	4th
2018	Did not enter	

**Red border color indicates tournament was held on home soil.

== Junior competitive record ==
=== Suhandinata Cup ===
Year	Round	Pos
2000 to 2023	Did not enter	
2024	Group stage	36th

=== Commonwealth Youth Games ===
==== Mixed team ====
Year	Round	Pos
2004	Did not enter	

=== Pan American Junior Team Championships ===
==== Mixed team ====
Year	Round	Pos
1977 to 2004	Did not enter	
2006	Group stage	
2007	Group stage	10th
2008	Group stage	9th
2009	Did not enter	
2010	Did not enter	
2011	Group stage	9th
2012	Did not enter	
2013	Did not enter	
2014	Did not enter	
2015	Did not enter	
2016	Did not enter	
2017	Did not enter	
2018	Did not enter	
2019	Did not enter	
2021	Did not enter	
2022	Did not enter	
2023	Did not enter	
2024	Group stage	6th
2025	Did not enter	

=== CAREBACO Junior Team Championships ===
==== Mixed team ====
Year	Round	Pos
1976	Fourth place	4th
1978	Fourth place	4th
1979	Third place	3rd
1980	Champions	1st
1981	Champions	1st
1982	Fourth place	4th
1983	Fourth place	4th
1984	Third place	3rd
1985	Champions	1st
1986	Champions	1st
1987	Runners-up	2nd
1988	Fourth place	4th
1990	Third place	3rd
1992	Fourth place	4th
1993	Fourth place	4th
1995	Third place	3rd
1996	Runners-up	2nd
1997	Fourth place	4th
1998	Did not enter	
1999	Runners-up	2nd
2000	Third place	3rd
2001	Third place	3rd
2002	Third place	3rd
2004	Champions	1st
2005	Third place	3rd
2007	Third place	3rd
2011	Fourth place	4th
2012	Fifth place	5th
2013	Sixth place	6th
2014	Runners-up	2nd
2015	3rd / 4th in group	3rd
2016	Group stage	5th
2017	Third place	3rd

**Red border color indicates tournament was held on home soil.

== Players ==
=== Current squad ===
As of 2 January 2024

==== Men's team ====
Name	DoB/Age	Ranking of event		
Name	DoB/Age	MS	MD	XD
Nicholas Bonkowsky	14 June 1988 (age 37)	561	-	557
Nathaniel Khillawan	12 June 2000 (age 25)	1245	591	1021
Reece Marcano	2 February 2004 (age 21)	428	591	539
Ryan Sinanan	15 March 2005 (age 20)	653	482	633
Vishal Ramsubhag	28 May 2006 (age 19)	1245	482	740
Patrick Dickson	19 August 2004 (age 20)	894	717	1021
Vance Juteram	30 December 2002 (age 22)	894	717	740
Alex Paul	5 March 2003 (age 22)	894	-	-

==== Women's team ====
Name	DoB/Age	Ranking of event		
Name	DoB/Age	WS	WD	XD
Nekeisha Blake	17 March 1987 (age 38)	990	589	633
Chequeda de Boulet	28 January 2001 (age 24)	178	-	539
Sidney Morris	15 May 2007 (age 18)	-	589	1021
Amara Joachim	17 June 2005 (age 20)	586	-	740
Destiny Rattan	4 June 2004 (age 21)	990	589	1021
Cheyenne Bhola	28 December 2008 (age 16)	990	419	1021
Shivani Koonj-Beharry	13 December 2006 (age 18)	990	419	1021
Danyelle Barnes	5 May 2006 (age 19)	990	-	740
