= Guatemala International =

Badminton championships

- Sport: Badminton
- Founded: 1997
- Founder: Federación Nacional de Bádminton Guatemala
- Country: Guatemala

The Guatemala International is an open badminton tournament held in Guatemala. The tournament has been an International Series level in 1997, 1998, 1999, 2003, 2012, 2013, 2016, then in 2009 categorized as Future Series level, and in 2010, 2011, 2014, 2015 categorized as International Challenge by the Badminton World Federation. The tournament is sanctioned by the Badminton World Federation, so the players can improved their point in world ranking.

In 2013, the tournament was an International Series level, with the official participation of athletes from 8 countries. In 2014, the Huawei sponsored tournament gathered 120 athletes from 15 countries. In 2015 and 2016, the tournament was held at the Olympic City Sports Coliseum, and sponsored by Herbalife. The 2015 season was a part of the 2016 Rio Olympics qualification, and have a total pursue $15,000, which attracted 97 players from 33 countries, and for the 2016, 63 players from 12 countries competes. In 2017, the national federation host two level 4 badminton tournament, the Future and International Series.

== Previous winners ==
=== Guatemala International Challenge ===
Year	Men's singles	Women's singles	Men's doubles	Women's doubles	Mixed doubles
1997	(Guatemala) Kenneth Erichsen	(Jamaica) Nigella Saunders	(Guatemala) Christian Erichsen (Guatemala) Kenneth Erichsen	(Jamaica) Alya Lewis (Jamaica) Nigella Saunders	(Jamaica) Robert Richards (Jamaica) Nigella Saunders
1998	(United States) Kevin Han	(Canada) Jody Patrick	(United States) Howard Bach (United States) Mark Manha	(Canada) Milaine Cloutier (Canada) Robbyn Hermitage	(Canada) Brent Olynyk (Canada) Robbyn Hermitage
1999	(United States) Kevin Han	(Canada) Denyse Julien	(United States) Howard Bach (United States) Mark Manha	(Canada) Denyse Julien (Canada) Charmaine Reid	(Spain) José Antonio Crespo (Spain) Dolores Marco
2000– 2002	No competition				
2003	(Wales) Richard Vaughan	(Japan) Miho Tanaka	(Japan) Keita Masuda (Japan) Tadashi Ohtsuka	(Japan) Yoshiko Iwata (Japan) Miyuki Tai	(Canada) Philippe Bourret (Canada) Denyse Julien
2004– 2008	No competition				
2009	(Guatemala) Kevin Cordón	(Spain) Sandra Chirlaque	(Guatemala) Kevin Cordón (Guatemala) Rodolfo Ramírez	no competition	(Guatemala) Rodolfo Ramírez (Peru) Lorena Duany
2010	(Guatemala) Kevin Cordón	(Germany) Nicole Grether	(Canada) Adrian Liu (Canada) Derrick Ng	(Germany) Nicole Grether (Canada) Charmaine Reid	(Canada) Toby Ng (Canada) Grace Gao
2011	(Russia) Ivan Sozonov	(Canada) Michelle Li	(Russia) Vladimir Ivanov (Russia) Ivan Sozonov	(Canada) Grace Gao (Canada) Joycelyn Ko	(Canada) Toby Ng (Canada) Grace Gao
2012	(Guatemala) Kevin Cordón	(Guatemala) Nikté Sotomayor	(Guatemala) Jonathan Solís (Guatemala) Rodolfo Ramírez	(Guatemala) Ana Lucia de León (Guatemala) Nikté Sotomayor	(Guatemala) Anibal Marroquin (Guatemala) Nikté Sotomayor
2013	(Guatemala) Rodolfo Ramírez	(Dominican Republic) Berónica Vibieca	(Guatemala) Jonathan Solís (Guatemala) Rodolfo Ramírez	(Guatemala) Krisley López (Guatemala) Nikté Sotomayor	(Guatemala) Jonathan Solís (Guatemala) Nikté Sotomayor
2014	(Spain) Pablo Abián	(Italy) Jeanine Cicognini	(France) Laurent Constantin (France) Matthieu Lo Ying Ping	(United States) Eva Lee (United States) Paula Lynn Obañana	(United States) Howard Shu (United States) Eva Lee
2015	(Guatemala) Kevin Cordón	(United States) Rong Schafer	(Germany) Michael Fuchs (Germany) Johannes Schöttler	(Germany) Johanna Goliszewski (Germany) Carla Nelte	(Germany) Michael Fuchs (Germany) Birgit Michels
2016	(Cuba) Osleni Guerrero	(Brazil) Lohaynny Vicente	(India) Alwin Francis (India) Tarun Kona	(Guatemala) Mariana Paiz (Guatemala) Nikté Sotomayor	(Guatemala) Jonathan Solís (Guatemala) Nikté Sotomayor
2017	(Guatemala) Kevin Cordón	(Peru) Daniela Macías	(United States) Phillip Chew (United States) Ryan Chew	(Peru) Daniela Macías (Peru) Dánica Nishimura	(Cuba) Leodannis Martinez (Cuba) Tahimara Oropeza
2018	(Guatemala) Kevin Cordón	(Canada) Talia Ng	(Guatemala) Rubén Castellanos (Guatemala) Aníbal Marroquín	(Canada) Talia Ng (Canada) Josephine Wu	(Canada) Joshua Hurlburt-Yu (Canada) Josephine Wu
2019	(Guatemala) Kevin Cordón	(Indonesia) Ghaida Nurul Ghaniyu	(Brazil) Fabrício Farias (Brazil) Francielton Farias	(Brazil) Jaqueline Lima (Brazil) Sâmia Lima	(Brazil) Fabrício Farias (Brazil) Jaqueline Lima
2020	Cancelled (Note: This tournament, originally to be played from 23 to 27 September, was later cancelled due to the COVID-19 pandemic in Guatemala.)				
2021	(Guatemala) Kevin Cordón	(United States) Jennie Gai	(Canada) Kevin Lee (Canada) Ty Alexander Lindeman	(United States) Francesca Corbett (United States) Allison Lee	(Canada) Ty Alexander Lindeman (Canada) Josephine Wu
2022	(Italy) Giovanni Toti	(Bulgaria) Hristomira Popovska	(Guatemala) Jonathan Solís (Guatemala) Aníbal Marroquín	(Canada) Sharon Au (Canada) Jeslyn Chow	(Guatemala) Jonathan Solís (Guatemala) Diana Corleto
2023	(Brazil) Ygor Coelho	(India) Samiya Farooqui	(Canada) Kevin Lee (Canada) Ty Alexander Lindeman	(Canada) Catherine Choi (Canada) Josephine Wu	(Canada) Ty Alexander Lindeman (Canada) Josephine Wu
2024	No competition				
2025	(Sri Lanka) Dumindu Abeywickrama	(Canada) Rachel Chan	(Brazil) Fabrício Farias (Brazil) Davi Silva	(Japan) Mao Hatasue (Japan) Kanano Muroya	(Canada) Timothy Lock (Canada) Chloe Hoang
2026	(Brazil) Jonathan Matias	(Brazil) Juliana Viana Vieira	(Canada) Kevin Lee (Canada) Ty Alexander Lindeman	(Brazil) Sânia Lima (Brazil) Juliana Viana Vieira	(Canada) Timothy Lock (Canada) Chloe Hoang

=== Guatemala International Series ===
Year	Men's singles	Women's singles	Men's doubles	Women's doubles	Mixed doubles	Ref
2023	(Guatemala) Kevin Cordón	(United States) Ishika Jaiswal	(Mexico) Job Castillo (Mexico) Luis Montoya	(Guatemala) Diana Corleto (Guatemala) Nikté Sotomayor	(Algeria) Koceila Mammeri (Algeria) Tanina Mammeri	
2024	No competition					
2025	(Brazil) Jonathan Matias	(United States) Ella Lin	(Australia) Pramudya Kusumawardana (Australia) Jack Yu	(Lithuania) Viltė Paulauskaitė (Czech Republic) Sharleen van Coppenolle	(United States) Ryan Ma (United States) Ella Lin	
2026						

=== Guatemala Future Series ===
Year	Men's singles	Women's singles	Men's doubles	Women's doubles	Mixed doubles
2017	(India) Karan Rajan	(Guatemala) Nikté Sotomayor	(Guatemala) Jonathan Solís (Guatemala) Rodolfo Ramírez	(Guatemala) Diana Corleto (Guatemala) Mariana Paiz	(Guatemala) Jonathan Solís (Guatemala) Nikté Sotomayor
2018	No competition				
2019	(Mexico) Job Castillo	(Guatemala) Diana Corleto	(Guatemala) Jonathan Solís (Guatemala) Aníbal Marroquín	(Guatemala) Lucía Albanes (Guatemala) Michele Barrios	(Guatemala) Brandon Alavardo (Guatemala) Alejandra Paiz
2020	Cancelled (Note: This tournament, originally to be played from 4 to 8 November, was later cancelled due to the COVID-19 pandemic in Guatemala.)				
2021	(Guatemala) Rubén Castellanos	(United States) Lauren Lam	(United States) Enrico Asuncion (United States) Don Henley Averia	(Guatemala) Diana Corleto (Guatemala) Nikté Sotomayor	(Guatemala) Jonathan Solís (Guatemala) Diana Corleto
2022	(Japan) Yuta Kikuchi	(France) Malya Hoareau	(Guatemala) José Granados (Guatemala) Antonio Ortíz	(Guatemala) Alejandra Paiz (Guatemala) Mariana Paiz	(France) Tino Daoudal (France) Malya Hoareau
2023	(Indonesia) Muhammad Sultan	(Japan) Tomoka Miyazaki	(Indonesia) Muhammad Halim As Sidiq (Indonesia) Muhammad Sultan	(Japan) Mei Sudo (Japan) Nao Yamakita	(Japan) Daigo Tanioka (Japan) Maya Taguchi
2024	(Peru) Adriano Viale	(France) Romane Cloteaux-Foucault	(Guatemala) Christopher Martínez (Guatemala) Jonathan Solís	(Guatemala) Diana Corleto (Guatemala) Nikté Sotomayor	(Guatemala) Christopher Martínez (Guatemala) Diana Corleto
2025	(Guatemala) Kevin Cordón	(Colombia) Juliana Giraldo	(Denmark) Emil Langemark (Denmark) Mikkel Langemark	(Guatemala) Diana Corleto (Guatemala) Nikté Sotomayor	(Guatemala) Christopher Martínez (Guatemala) Diana Corleto
2026	(Japan) Shunki Hagiwara	(Japan) Meisa Anami	(Japan) Mahiro Oku (Japan) Masato Yamashiro	(Japan) Aoi Banno (Japan) Yuzu Ueno	(Japan) Mahiro Oku (Japan) Ria Haga

== Performances by nation ==
=== Guatemala International Challenge ===
As of the 2026 edition

Pos	Nation	MS	WS	MD	WD	XD	Total
1	Canada	0	5	4	6.5	9	24.5
1	Guatemala*	10	1	6	3	4.5	24.5
3	United States	2	2	3	2	1	10
4	Brazil	2	2	2	2	1	9
5	Germany	0	1	1	1.5	1	4.5
6	Japan	0	1	1	2	0	4
7	Jamaica	0	1	0	1	1	3
7	Spain	1	1	0	0	1	3
9	Peru	0	1	0	1	0.5	2.5
10	Cuba	1	0	0	0	1	2
10	India	0	1	1	0	0	2
10	Italy	1	1	0	0	0	2
10	Russia	1	0	1	0	0	2
14	Bulgaria	0	1	0	0	0	1
14	Dominican Republic	0	1	0	0	0	1
14	France	0	0	1	0	0	1
14	Indonesia	0	1	0	0	0	1
14	Sri Lanka	1	0	0	0	0	1
14	Wales	1	0	0	0	0	1
	Total	20	20	20	19	20	99

=== Guatemala International Series ===
As of the 2025 edition

Pos	Nation	MS	WS	MD	WD	XD	Total
1	United States	0	2	0	0	1	3
2	Guatemala*	1	0	0	1	0	2
3	Algeria	0	0	0	0	1	1
3	Australia	0	0	1	0	0	1
3	Brazil	1	0	0	0	0	1
3	Mexico	0	0	1	0	0	1
7	Czech Republic	0	0	0.5	0	0	0.5
7	Lithuania	0	0	0.5	0	0	0.5
	Total	2	2	2	2	2	10

=== Guatemala Future Series ===
As of the 2026 edition

Pos	Nation	MS	WS	MD	WD	XD	Total
1	Guatemala*	2	2	4	6	5	19
2	Japan	2	2	1	2	2	9
3	France		2			1	3
4	Indonesia	1		1			2
4	United States		1	1			2
6	Colombia		1				1
6	Denmark			1			1
6	India	1					1
6	Mexico	1					1
6	Peru	1					1
	Total	8	8	8	8	8	40

* Host nation
