= Carebaco International =

International badminton tournament

Carebaco
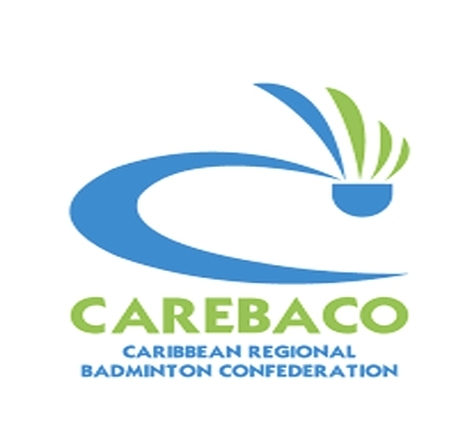
- Official logo
- Formation: August, 1972
- Type: Sports federation
- Members: 15 member associations
- President: Dionne Forde (Barbados)

The Carebaco International is an international badminton tournament of the "Caribbean Regional Badminton Confederation" (Carebaco). Until 1999 the tournament was a closed event eligible only for Carebaco members, but to gain BWF World Ranking points since 1999 the Carebaco International tournament became a level 4 open individual event, now part of the BWF Future Series.

The tournament established since 1972, when four countries in the Caribbean Region with the fanatical badminton enthusiasts started an annual competition among themselves. These countries were Jamaica, Trinidad and Tobago, Suriname and Guyana. As the years progressed the membership of Carebaco increased to include Aruba, Barbados, Bermuda, the Cayman Islands, Cuba, Curaçao, the Dominican Republic, Grenada, Guatemala, Haiti, Panama, Puerto Rico, and Martinique.

The Carebaco International is held annually and is part of the Carebaco Games which also include a mixed team event for both seniors and juniors players of Carebaco member and associate member countries. The individual event for juniors is nowadays played in the different age groups comparable to the Pan Am Junior Badminton Championships. Since 2013 there is also an Open Carebaco Junior International U19 part of the Badminton World Federation Future Juniors series eligible for BWF Juniors World Ranking Points.

== Carebaco host venues ==
Year	Host city	Country
1972	Kingston	Jamaica
1973	Paramaribo	Suriname
1974	Georgetown	Guyana
1975	Port of Spain	Trinidad and Tobago
1976	Kingston	Jamaica
1977	Oranjestad	Aruba (no competition - technical issues)
1978	Paramaribo	Suriname
1979	Santa Cruz	Aruba
1980	Georgetown	Guyana
1981	Port of Spain	Trinidad and Tobago
1982	Kingston	Jamaica
1983	Willemstad	Curaçao
1984	Paramaribo	Suriname
1985	Georgetown	Guyana
1986	Port of Spain	Trinidad and Tobago
1987	Kingston	Jamaica
1988	Paramaribo	Suriname
1989	Georgetown	Guyana; Canceled - No Competition
1990	Port of Spain	Trinidad and Tobago
1991	Georgetown	Guyana; Canceled - No Competition
1992	Willemstad	Curaçao
1993	Bridgetown	Barbados

Year	Host city	Country
1994	n/a	No Competition
1995	Kingston	Jamaica
1996	Port of Spain	Trinidad and Tobago
1997	Bridgetown	Barbados
1998	Havana	Cuba
1999	Paramaribo	Suriname
2000	Bridgetown	Barbados (Only Juniors events held)
2001	Kingston	Jamaica
2002	Mayaguez	Puerto Rico
2003	Port of Spain	Trinidad and Tobago
2004	Central Region	Trinidad and Tobago
2005	Havana	Cuba
2006	n/a	No Competition
2007	Paramaribo	Suriname
2008	n/a	No Competition
2009	n/a	No Competition
2010	n/a	No Competition
2011	Wildey, St. Michael	Barbados
2012	Santo Domingo	Dominican Republic
2013	San Juan	Puerto Rico

Year	Host city	Country
2014	Kingston	Jamaica
2015	Santo Domingo	Dominican Republic
2016	Oranjestad	Aruba
2017	Tacarigua	Trinidad and Tobago
2018	Paramaribo	Suriname
2019	Wildey, St. Michael	Barbados
2020	Tacarigua	Trinidad and Tobago; Canceled due to Covid-19
2021	Tacarigua	Trinidad and Tobago; Canceled due to Covid-19
2022	Oranjestad	Aruba; Canceled - No Competition
2023	Tacarigua	Trinidad and Tobago (Only Juniors events held)
2024	Oranjestad	Aruba (Only Juniors events held)
2025	Wildey, St. Michael	Barbados
2026	Kingston	Jamaica
2027		

== Carebaco previous winners Individual event ==
Year	Men's singles	Women's singles	Men's doubles	Women's doubles	Mixed doubles
CARIBBEAN CHAMPIONSHIPS CLOSED EVENT
1972	(Suriname (Kingdom of the Netherlands)) Romeo Caster	(Jamaica) Jennifer Haddad	No doubles competition	No doubles competition	No doubles competition
1973	(Suriname (Kingdom of the Netherlands)) Romeo Caster	(Jamaica) Jennifer Haddad	(Suriname (Kingdom of the Netherlands)) Roel Sjauw Mook (Suriname (Kingdom of the Netherlands)) Reginald Chin Jong	(Jamaica) Jennifer Haddad (Jamaica) Margareth Parslow	(Jamaica) Richard Wong (Jamaica) Margareth Parslow
1974	(Jamaica) Keith Palmer	(Trinidad and Tobago) Beena Narwani	(Suriname (Kingdom of the Netherlands)) Roel Sjauw Mook (Suriname (Kingdom of the Netherlands)) Otmar Kersout	(Jamaica) Jennifer Haddad (Jamaica) Margareth Parslow	(Jamaica) Richard Roberts (Jamaica) Jennifer Haddad
1975	(Jamaica) Richard Wong	(Jamaica) Jennifer Haddad	(Suriname) Roel Sjauw Mook (Suriname) Otmar Kersout	(Jamaica) Jennifer Haddad (Jamaica) G. Hew	(Jamaica) Brian Haddad (Jamaica) Anna van de Groot
1976	(Jamaica) Richard Wong	(Trinidad and Tobago) Beena Narwani	(Suriname) Roel Sjauw Mook (Suriname) Otmar Kersout	(Jamaica) Jennifer Haddad (Jamaica) Christine Chung	(Jamaica) Richard Wong (Jamaica) Jennifer Haddad
1977	no competition				
1978	(Jamaica) George Hugh	(Trinidad and Tobago) Beena Narwani	(Jamaica) Brian Haddad (Jamaica) Victor Ziadie	(Suriname) Diana Uiterloo (Suriname) Loes Sjauw Mook	(Jamaica) Brian Haddad (Jamaica) Jennifer Haddad
1979	(Jamaica) George Hugh	(Trinidad and Tobago) Beena Narwani	(Jamaica) George Hugh (Jamaica) Sammy Leyow	(Jamaica) Carol Leyow (Jamaica) Marie Leyow	(Jamaica) George Hugh (Jamaica) Marie Leyow
1980	(Jamaica) Sammy Leyow	(Jamaica) Carol Leyow	(Jamaica) Tommy Lee (Jamaica) Sammy Leyow	(Jamaica) Carol Leyow (Jamaica) Marie Leyow	(Jamaica) Dudley Chen (Jamaica) Marie Leyow
1981	(Jamaica) George Hugh	(Jamaica) Marie Leyow	(Jamaica) George Hugh (Jamaica) Sammy Leyow	(Jamaica) Anette Leyow (Jamaica) Marie Leyow	(Jamaica) George Hugh (Jamaica) Marie Leyow
1982	(Jamaica) Tommy Lee	(Jamaica) Marie Leyow	(Jamaica) George Hugh (Jamaica) Sammy Leyow	(Jamaica) Carol Leyow (Jamaica) Marie Leyow	(Jamaica) George Hugh (Jamaica) Marie Leyow
1983	(Jamaica) Garth King	(Trinidad and Tobago) Debra O'Connor	(Jamaica) Garth King (Jamaica) Sammy Leyow	(Trinidad and Tobago) Virginia Chariandy (Trinidad and Tobago) Debra O'Connor	(Trinidad and Tobago) Carl Khan (Trinidad and Tobago) Debra O'Connor
1984	(Suriname) Mike van Daal	(Trinidad and Tobago) Debra O'Connor	(Suriname) Mike van Daal (Suriname) Clyde van Daal	(Trinidad and Tobago) Virginia Chariandy (Trinidad and Tobago) Debra O'Connor	(Jamaica) Sammy Leyow (Jamaica) Marie Leyow
1985	(Suriname) Mike van Daal	(Trinidad and Tobago) Debra O'Connor	(Suriname) Mike van Daal (Suriname) John Sno	(Trinidad and Tobago) Virginia Chariandy (Trinidad and Tobago) Debra O'Connor	(Suriname) Mike van Daal (Suriname) Sherida Ramzan
1986	(Jamaica) Robert Richards	(Trinidad and Tobago) Debra O'Connor	(Jamaica) Robert Richards (Jamaica) Garth King	(Trinidad and Tobago) Debra O'Connor (Trinidad and Tobago) Beverly Tang Choon	(Trinidad and Tobago) Carl Khan (Trinidad and Tobago) Debra O'Connor
1987	(Jamaica) Garth King	(Trinidad and Tobago) Debra O'Connor	(Jamaica) Robert Richards (Jamaica) Garth King	(Trinidad and Tobago) Debra O'Connor (Trinidad and Tobago) Beverly Tang Choon	(Jamaica) Robert Richards (Jamaica) Marie Leyow
1988	(Suriname) Hedwig de La Fuente	(Suriname) Yu Nilen Shoh Chung	(Suriname) Clyde van Daal (Suriname) John Sno	(Suriname) Yu Nilen Shoh Chung (Suriname) Loes Sjauw Mook	(Suriname) Hedwig de La Fuente (Suriname) Yu Nilen Shoh Chung
1989	no competition				
1990	(Jamaica) Vernon Griffiths	(Trinidad and Tobago) Debra O'Connor	(Trinidad and Tobago) Ronald Clarke (Trinidad and Tobago) David Lee Kim	(Trinidad and Tobago) Debra O'Connor (Trinidad and Tobago) Virginia Chariandy	(Trinidad and Tobago) Ronald Clarke (Trinidad and Tobago) Debra O'Connor
1991	no competition				
1992	(Guatemala) Kenneth Erichsen	(Trinidad and Tobago) Debra O'Connor	(Jamaica) Roy Paul Jr. (Jamaica) Robert Richards	(Jamaica) Marie Leyow (Jamaica) Terry Leyow	(Jamaica) Robert Richards (Jamaica) Marie Leyow
1993	(Guatemala) Kenneth Erichsen	(Trinidad and Tobago) Debra O'Connor	(Jamaica) Roy Paul Jr. (Jamaica) Paul Leyow	(Trinidad and Tobago) Debra O'Connor (Trinidad and Tobago) Sabrina Cassie	(Jamaica) Paul Leyow (Jamaica) Terry Leyow
1994	no competition				
1995	(Guatemala) Kenneth Erichsen	(Trinidad and Tobago) Debra O'Connor	(Jamaica) Roy Paul Jr. (Jamaica) Paul Leyow	(Trinidad and Tobago) Debra O'Connor (Trinidad and Tobago) Beverly Tang Choon	(Jamaica) Paul Leyow (Jamaica) Terry Leyow
1996	(Guatemala) Kenneth Erichsen	(Trinidad and Tobago) Debra O'Connor		(Trinidad and Tobago) Debra O'Connor (Trinidad and Tobago) Beverly Tang Choon	
1997	(Guatemala) Kenneth Erichsen	(Jamaica) Nigella Saunders	(Jamaica) Roy Paul Jr. (Jamaica) Robert Richards	(Trinidad and Tobago) Sabrina Cassie (Trinidad and Tobago) Zuedi Mack	(Barbados) Argyle Maynard (Barbados) Chalise Jordan
1998	(Jamaica) Roy Paul Jr.	(Cuba) Yesenia Leon Ruiz	(Jamaica) Roy Paul Jr. (Jamaica) Robert Richards	(Jamaica) Shackerah Cupidon (Jamaica) Terry Leyow	(Jamaica) Roy Paul Jr. (Jamaica) Terry Leyow
CARIBBEAN CAREBACO OPEN INDIVIDUAL EVENT
1999	(Canada) Mike Beres	(Canada) Kara Solmundson	(Canada) Bobby Milroy (Canada) William Milroy	(Canada) Milaine Cloutier (Canada) Robbyn Hermitage	(Canada) Mike Beres (Canada) Kara Solmundson
2000	no seniors competition, only juniors events held				
2001	(Jamaica) Bradley Graham	(Jamaica) Nigella Saunders	(Jamaica) Alex Haddad (Jamaica) Roy Paul Jr.	(Jamaica) Alya Lewis (Jamaica) Nigella Saunders	(Jamaica) Bradley Graham (Jamaica) Nigella Saunders
2002	(Netherlands) Tjitte Weistra	(Peru) Sandra Jimeno	(Brazil) Guilherme Kumasaka (Brazil) Guilherme Pardo	(Peru) Sandra Jimeno (Peru) Doriana Rivera	(Netherlands) Tjitte Weistra (Peru) Doriana Rivera
2003	(Japan) Tōru Matsumoto	(Japan) Miyo Akao	(Germany) Ingo Kindervater (Germany) Björn Siegemund	(Japan) Yoshiko Iwata (Japan) Miyuki Tai	(Canada) Mike Beres (Canada) Jody Patrick
2004	(Canada) Andrew Dabeka	(Canada) Charmaine Reid	(United States) Khankham Malaythong (United States) Raju Rai	(Canada) Helen Nichol (Canada) Charmaine Reid	(Canada) Philippe Bourret (Canada) Helen Nichol
2005	(Cuba) Ilian Perez	(Canada) Charmaine Reid	(Canada) Mike Beres (Canada) William Milroy	(Canada) Helen Nichol (Canada) Charmaine Reid	(Canada) Mike Beres (Canada) Valérie Loker
2007	(France) Brice Leverdez	(Guatemala) Marlin Maldonado	(Brazil) Paulo von Scala (Brazil) Lucas Araújo	(Brazil) Paula Pereira (Brazil) Thayse Cruz	(Brazil) Lucas Araújo (Brazil) Thayse Cruz
2011	(United States) Howard Shu	(Brazil) Lohaynny Vicente	(Suriname) Virgil Soeroredjo (Suriname) Mitchel Wongsodikromo	(Brazil) Lohaynny Vicente (Brazil) Luana Vicente	(Suriname) Mitchel Wongsodikromo (Suriname) Crystal Leefmans
2012	(New Zealand) Joe Wu	(Canada) Nicole Grether	(Guatemala) Rodolfo Ramírez (Guatemala) Jonathan Solís	(Canada) Nicole Grether (Canada) Charmaine Reid	(Dominican Republic) Nelson Javier (Dominican Republic) Berónica Vibieca
2013	(Italy) Rosario Maddaloni	(Guatemala) Nikté Sotomayor	(Jamaica) Gareth Henry (United States) Bjorn Seguin	(Dominican Republic) Berónica Vibieca (Dominican Republic) Daigenis Saturria	(Guatemala) Aníbal Marroquín (Guatemala) Krisley López
2014	(Jamaica) Gareth Henry	(Trinidad and Tobago) Solángel Guzmán	(Jamaica) Gareth Henry (Jamaica) Garron Palmer	(Barbados) Shari Watson (Barbados) Tamisha Williams	(Jamaica) Garron Palmer (Jamaica) Mikaylia Haldane
2015	(Jamaica) Gareth Henry	(Trinidad and Tobago) Solángel Guzmán	(Jamaica) Gareth Henry (Jamaica) Dayvon Reid	(Dominican Republic) Daigenis Saturria (Dominican Republic) Licelott Sánchez	(Dominican Republic) Nelson Javier (Dominican Republic) Daigenis Saturria
2016	(Dominican Republic) Nelson Javier	(Wales) Aimee Moran	(Suriname) Gilmar Jones (Suriname) Dylan Darmohoetomo	(Dominican Republic) Nairoby Jiménez (Dominican Republic) Bermary Polanco	(Barbados) Dakeil Thorpe (Barbados) Tamisha Williams
2017	(Guatemala) Kevin Cordón	(United States) Jamie Subandhi	(Jamaica) Gareth Henry (Jamaica) Samuel Ricketts	(Peru) Daniela Macías (Peru) Dánica Nishimura	(Peru) Daniel la Torre (Peru) Dánica Nishimura
2018	(Luxembourg) Robert Mann	(Barbados) Tamisha Williams	(Barbados) Shae Michael Martin (Barbados) Dakeil Thorpe	(Barbados) Monyata Riviera (Barbados) Tamisha Williams	(Suriname) Dylan Darmohoetomo (Suriname) Crystal Leefmans
2019	(England) Sam Parsons	(Wales) Jordan Hart	(Jamaica) Gareth Henry (Jamaica) Samuel Ricketts	(Barbados) Monyata Riviera (Barbados) Tamisha Williams	(United States) Vinson Chiu (United States) Breanna Chi
2020	no competition canceled due to Covid-19				
2021	no competition canceled due to Covid-19				
2022	no competition				
2023	no seniors competition, only juniors events held				
2024	no seniors competition, only juniors events held				
CARIBBEAN CHAMPIONSHIPS CLOSED EVENT
2025	(Barbados) Kennie King	(Trinidad and Tobago) Amara Urquhart	(Barbados) Kennie King (Barbados) Shae Martin	(Trinidad and Tobago) Nakeisha Blake (Barbados) Sabrina Scott	(Jamaica) Kenneth Anglin (Jamaica) Breanna Bisnott
2026	(Jamaica) Craig Allison	(Jamaica) Tahlia Richardson	(Jamaica) Craig Allison (Jamaica) Matthew Yee-Grant	(Jamaica) Alexandra Beckford (Jamaica) Aaliyah Walker	(Jamaica) Kenneth Anglin (Jamaica) Breanna Bisnott

== Carebaco winners team championships ==
Venue	Country	Year	Gold	Silver	Bronze
Kingston	Jamaica	1972	Jamaica	Suriname	Guyana
Paramaribo	Suriname	1973	Jamaica	Suriname	Trinidad and Tobago
Georgetown	Guyana	1974	Jamaica	Suriname	Trinidad and Tobago
Port of Spain	Trinidad and Tobago	1975	Jamaica	Suriname	Guyana
Kingston	Jamaica	1976	Jamaica	Suriname	Guyana
Paramaribo	Suriname	1978	Jamaica	Suriname	Trinidad and Tobago
Santa Cruz	Aruba	1979	Jamaica	Suriname	Trinidad and Tobago
Georgetown	Guyana	1980	Jamaica	Suriname	Guyana
Port of Spain	Trinidad and Tobago	1981	Jamaica	Suriname	Trinidad and Tobago
Kingston	Jamaica	1982	Jamaica	Suriname	Trinidad and Tobago
Willemstad	Curaçao	1983	Suriname	Trinidad and Tobago	Guyana
Paramaribo	Suriname	1984	Suriname	Trinidad and Tobago	Guyana
Georgetown	Guyana	1985	Trinidad and Tobago	Guyana	Barbados
Port of Spain	Trinidad and Tobago	1986	Jamaica	Trinidad and Tobago	Barbados
Kingston	Jamaica	1987	Jamaica	Trinidad and Tobago	Barbados
Port of Spain	Trinidad and Tobago	1990	Trinidad and Tobago	Barbados	Guyana
Willemstad	Curaçao	1992	Jamaica	Trinidad and Tobago	Barbados
Bridgetown	Barbados	1993	Jamaica	Trinidad and Tobago	Barbados
Kingston	Jamaica	1995	Jamaica	Trinidad and Tobago	Guatemala
Port of Spain	Trinidad and Tobago	1996	Jamaica	Guatemala	Trinidad and Tobago
Bridgetown	Barbados	1997	Jamaica	Barbados	Trinidad and Tobago
Havana	Cuba	1998	Jamaica	Guatemala	Cuba
Paramaribo	Suriname	1999	Jamaica	Trinidad and Tobago	Guatemala
Kingston	Jamaica	2001	Jamaica	Trinidad and Tobago	Suriname
Mayaguez	Puerto Rico	2002	Guatemala	Trinidad and Tobago	Puerto Rico
Port of Spain	Trinidad and Tobago	2003	Trinidad and Tobago	Barbados	Suriname
Chaguanas	Trinidad and Tobago	2004	Trinidad and Tobago	Suriname	Barbados
Havana	Cuba	2005	Cuba	Jamaica	Suriname
Wildey, St. Michael	Barbados	2011	Suriname	Barbados	Curaçao
Santo Domingo	Dominican Republic	2012	Dominican Republic	Suriname	Jamaica
Kingston	Jamaica	2014	Trinidad and Tobago	Jamaica	Barbados
Santo Domingo	Dominican Republic	2015	Jamaica	Dominican Republic	Trinidad and Tobago
Oranjestad	Aruba	2016	Dominican Republic	Suriname	Trinidad and Tobago
Tacarigua	Trinidad and Tobago	2017	Jamaica	Dominican Republic	Barbados
Paramaribo	Suriname	2018	Barbados	Suriname	Not awarded
Kingston	Jamaica	2026	Jamaica	Barbados	Trinidad and Tobago

=== CAREBACO junior team championships ===
Venue	Country	Year	Gold	Silver	Bronze
Kingston	Jamaica	1976	Jamaica	Guyana	Suriname
Paramaribo	Suriname	1978	Jamaica	Suriname	Guyana
Santa Cruz	Aruba	1979	Jamaica	Suriname	Trinidad and Tobago
Georgetown	Guyana	1980	Trinidad and Tobago	Jamaica	Suriname
Port of Spain	Trinidad and Tobago	1981	Trinidad and Tobago	Jamaica	Suriname
Kingston	Jamaica	1982	Jamaica	Suriname	Guyana
Willemstad	Curaçao	1983	Jamaica	Suriname	Guyana
Paramaribo	Suriname	1984	Suriname	Jamaica	Trinidad and Tobago
Georgetown	Guyana	1985	Trinidad and Tobago	Guyana	Barbados
Port of Spain	Trinidad and Tobago	1986	Trinidad and Tobago	Jamaica	Guyana
Kingston	Jamaica	1987	Jamaica	Trinidad and Tobago	Guyana
Paramaribo	Suriname	1988	Jamaica	Suriname	Guyana
Port of Spain	Trinidad and Tobago	1990	Jamaica	Guyana	Trinidad and Tobago
Willemstad	Curaçao	1992	Jamaica	Guyana	Barbados
Bridgetown	Barbados	1993	Jamaica	Barbados	Guyana
Kingston	Jamaica	1995	Jamaica	Barbados	Trinidad and Tobago
Port of Spain	Trinidad and Tobago	1996	Barbados	Trinidad and Tobago	Curaçao
Bridgetown	Barbados	1997	Jamaica	Suriname	Barbados
Havana	Cuba	1998	Jamaica	Cuba	Suriname
Paramaribo	Suriname	1999	Suriname	Trinidad and Tobago	Barbados
Bridgetown	Barbados	2000	Suriname	Jamaica	Trinidad and Tobago
Kingston	Jamaica	2001	Suriname	Jamaica	Trinidad and Tobago
Mayaguez	Puerto Rico	2002	Jamaica	Guatemala	Trinidad and Tobago
Port of Spain	Trinidad and Tobago	2003	Suriname	Jamaica	Trinidad and Tobago
Central Region, Chaguanas	Trinidad and Tobago	2004	Trinidad and Tobago	Jamaica	Suriname
Havana	Cuba	2005	Cuba	Jamaica	Trinidad and Tobago
Paramaribo	Suriname	2007	Suriname	Jamaica	Trinidad and Tobago
Wildey, St. Michael	Barbados	2011	Puerto Rico	Suriname	Barbados
Santo Domingo	Dominican Republic	2012	Puerto Rico	Dominican Republic	Suriname
San Juan	Puerto Rico	2013	Puerto Rico	Suriname	Dominican Republic
Kingston	Jamaica	2014	Jamaica	Trinidad and Tobago	Barbados
Santo Domingo	Dominican Republic	2015	Dominican Republic	Jamaica	Trinidad and Tobago
Santo Domingo	Dominican Republic	2015	Dominican Republic	Jamaica	Barbados
Oranjestad	Aruba	2016	Dominican Republic	Guyana	Suriname
Tacarigua	Trinidad and Tobago	2017	Dominican Republic	Jamaica	Trinidad and Tobago
Wildey, St. Michael	Barbados	2025	Trinidad and Tobago	Guadeloupe	Barbados
Kingston	Jamaica	2026	Guadeloupe	Jamaica	Barbados
