= Guyana national badminton team =

National badminton team representing Guyana

Guyana
- Association: Guyana Badminton Association (GBA)
- Confederation: BPA (Pan America)
- President: Emelia Ramdhani

BWF ranking
- Current ranking: 101 ▲2 (2 April 2024)
- Highest ranking: 74 (3 January 2023)

The Guyana national badminton team represents Guyana in international badminton team competitions. The Guyanese junior team have competed in the BWF World Junior Championships mixed team event, which is also called the Suhandinata Cup. The Guyanese team have never competed in the Pan American Badminton Championships.

== History ==
Badminton was first practiced in Guyana in the 1970s. The sport was played mostly by the Indo-Guyanese. The sport later grew in popularity and the national team later sent its first few players to debut in the 1992 CAREBACO Badminton Championships. The Ramdhani badminton family became a household name for badminton in Guyana.

Gokarn Ramdhani was appointed as president of the Guyana Badminton Association in the 1990s. Under his leadership, Guyanese badminton grew as the junior team claimed 2nd place at the CAREBACO Junior Team Championships in 1990, 1992 and 2016 before his passing in 2021. The Ramdhani siblings, Priyanna and Narayan Ramdhani have made many achievements for Guyanese badminton on the world stage. The Guyana badminton team later reached rank 74 on the BWF World Ranking which would be their highest ranking to date.

Emelia Ramdhani soon took over Gokarn's place as president of Guyana Badminton Association and head coach of the Guyana badminton team.

=== Mixed team ===
The Guyanese mixed team first competed in the 1972 CAREBACO Team Championships in Kingston, Jamaica. The team beat Trinidad and Tobago to finish in third place. The team then competed in the 1992 CAREBACO Team Championships and finished in 5th place. In 1993, the team finished in fourth place at the 1993 CAREBACO Team Championships.

== Competitive record ==
=== Thomas Cup ===
| Year | Round | Pos |
|---|---|---|
| 1949 to 1964 | Part of the United Kingdom | |
| 1967 to 2024 | Did not enter | |
| 2026 | To be determined | |
| 2028 | To be determined | |
| 2030 | To be determined | |

=== Uber Cup ===
| Year | Round | Pos |
|---|---|---|
| 1957 to 1966 | Part of the United Kingdom | |
| 1969 to 2024 | Did not enter | |
| 2026 | To be determined | |
| 2028 | To be determined | |
| 2030 | To be determined | |

=== Sudirman Cup ===
| Year | Round | Pos |
|---|---|---|
| 1989 to 2023 | Did not enter | |
| 2025 | To be determined | |
| 2027 | To be determined | |
| 2029 | To be determined | |

=== Pan American Team Championships ===
==== Men's team ====
| Year | Round | Pos |
|---|---|---|
| 2016 to 2024 | Did not enter | |
| 2026 | To be determined | |
| 2028 | To be determined | |
| 2030 | To be determined | |

==== Women's team ====
| Year | Round | Pos |
|---|---|---|
| 2016 to 2024 | Did not enter | |
| 2026 | To be determined | |
| 2028 | To be determined | |
| 2030 | To be determined | |

==== Mixed team ====
| Year | Round | Pos |
|---|---|---|
| 1977 to 2023 | Did not enter | |
| 2025 | To be determined | |
| 2027 | To be determined | |
| 2029 | To be determined | |

=== South American Games ===
==== Mixed team ====
| Year | Round | Pos |
|---|---|---|
| 2010 | To be determined | |
| 2018 | To be determined | |
| 2022 | To be determined | |

=== South American Team Championships ===
==== Mixed team ====
| Year | Round | Pos |
|---|---|---|
| 1984 to 2023 | Did not enter | |

=== Central American and Caribbean Games ===
==== Men's team ====
| Year | Round | Pos |
|---|---|---|
| 2010 | Did not enter | |

==== Women's team ====
| Year | Round | Pos |
|---|---|---|
| 2010 | Did not enter | |

==== Mixed team ====
| Year | Round | Pos |
|---|---|---|
| 1990 to 2023 | Did not enter | |

=== CAREBACO Team Championships ===
==== Mixed team ====
| Year | Round | Pos |
|---|---|---|
| 1972 | Third place | 3rd |
| 1973 | Fourth place | 4th |
| 1974 | Fourth place | 4th |
| 1975 | Third place | 3rd |
| 1976 | Third place | 3rd |
| 1978 | Fourth place | 4th |
| 1979 | Fourth place | 4th |
| 1980 | Fourth place | 4th |
| 1981 | Fourth place | 4th |
| 1982 | Fourth place | 4th |
| 1983 | Third place | 3rd |
| 1984 | Third place | 3rd |
| 1985 | Third place | 3rd |
| 1986 | Fourth place | 4th |
| 1987 | Fourth place | 4th |
| 1990 | Third place | 3rd |
| 1992 | Fourth place | 4th |
| 1993 | Fourth place | 4th |
| 1995 | Did not enter | |
| 1996 | Did not enter | |
| 1997 | Did not enter | |
| 1998 | Did not enter | |
| 1999 | Did not enter | |
| 2001 | Did not enter | |
| 2002 | Did not enter | |
| 2003 | Did not enter | |
| 2004 | Did not enter | |
| 2011 | Did not enter | |
| 2012 | Did not enter | |
| 2014 | Did not enter | |
| 2015 | Did not enter | |
| 2016 | Did not enter | |
| 2017 | Did not enter | |
| 2018 | Did not enter | |

**Red border color indicates tournament was held on home soil.

== Junior competitive record ==
=== Suhandinata Cup ===
| Year | Round | Pos |
|---|---|---|
| 2000 to 2014 | Did not enter | |
| 2015 | Group stage | 39th |
| 2016 | Did not enter | |
| 2017 | Did not enter | |
| 2018 | Group stage | 32nd |
| 2019 | Did not enter | |
| 2022 | Did not enter | |
| 2023 | Did not enter | |
| 2024 | To be determined | |

=== Pan American Junior Team Championships ===
==== Mixed team ====
| Year | Round | Pos |
|---|---|---|
| 1977 to 2008 | Did not enter | |
| 2009 | Group stage | 11th |
| 2010 | Did not enter | |
| 2011 | Did not enter | |
| 2012 | Did not enter | |
| 2013 | Did not enter | |
| 2014 | Did not enter | |
| 2015 | Did not enter | |
| 2016 | Did not enter | |
| 2017 | Did not enter | |
| 2018 | Did not enter | |
| 2019 | Did not enter | |
| 2021 | Did not enter | |
| 2022 | Did not enter | |
| 2023 | Did not enter | |
| 2024 | Did not enter | |

=== South American Junior Team Championships ===
==== Mixed team ====
| Year | Round | Pos |
|---|---|---|
| 1997 to 2023 | Did not enter | |

=== CAREBACO Junior Team Championships ===
==== Mixed team ====
| Year | Round | Pos |
|---|---|---|
| 1976 | Runners-up | 2nd |
| 1978 | Third place | 3rd |
| 1979 | Fourth place | 4th |
| 1980 | Fourth place | 4th |
| 1981 | Fourth place | 4th |
| 1982 | Third place | 3rd |
| 1983 | Third place | 3rd |
| 1984 | Fourth place | 4th |
| 1985 | Runners-up | 2nd |
| 1986 | Third place | 3rd |
| 1987 | Third place | 3rd |
| 1988 | Third place | 3rd |
| 1990 | Runners-up | 2nd |
| 1992 | Runners-up | 2nd |
| 1993 | Third place | 3rd |
| 1995 | Did not enter | |
| 1996 | Did not enter | |
| 1997 | Did not enter | |
| 1998 | Did not enter | |
| 1999 | Did not enter | |
| 2000 | Did not enter | |
| 2001 | Did not enter | |
| 2002 | Did not enter | |
| 2003 | Did not enter | |
| 2004 | Did not enter | |
| 2005 | Did not enter | |
| 2007 | Did not enter | |
| 2011 | Did not enter | |
| 2012 | Did not enter | |
| 2013 | Fourth place | 4th |
| 2014 | Did not enter | |
| 2015 | Did not enter | |
| 2016 | Runners-up | 2nd |
| 2017 | Group stage | 6th |

**Red border color indicates tournament was held on home soil.

== Staff ==
The following list shows the coaching staff for the Guyana national badminton team.

| Name | Role |
|---|---|
| (Guyana) Emelia Ramdhani | Coach |
| (Guyana) Jonathan Mangra | Coach |

== Players ==
=== Current squad ===
As of 2 January 2024

==== Men's team ====
| Name | DoB/Age | Ranking of event | | |
| Name | DoB/Age | MS | MD | XD |
|---|---|---|---|---|
| Akili Haynes | 18 June 2001 (age 23) | 781 | – | 355 |
| Tyrese Jeffrey | 30 October 2001 (age 23) | – | – | – |
| Narayan Ramdhani | 3 June 1998 (age 26) | – | – | – |

==== Women's team ====
| Name | DoB/Age | Ranking of event | | |
| Name | DoB/Age | WS | WD | XD |
|---|---|---|---|---|
| Priyanna Ramdhani | 2 January 2002 (age 23) | 385 | – | 355 |
| Jayde Dasilva | 18 August 2003 (age 21) | – | – | – |
| Ambika Ramraj | 20 January 1999 (age 26) | – | – | – |

=== Previous squads ===
- CAREBACO Team Championships: 1992, 1993
