= 1993 Pan Am Badminton Championships =

Tournament details
- Dates: 28 June – 4 July
- Nations: 9
- Venue: Coliseo Deportivo
- Location: Guatemala City, Guatemala

Champions
- Men's singles: (Peru) Mario Carulla
- Women's singles: (Trinidad and Tobago) Debra O'Connor
- Men's doubles: (Peru) Mario Carulla (Peru) José Iturriaga
- Women's doubles: (Peru) Silvia Jiménez (Peru) Maria Teresa Montero
- Mixed doubles: (Peru) Gustavo Salazar (Peru) Maria Teresa Montero

The 1993 Pan Am Badminton Championships (Spanish: Campeonato Panamericano de Bádminton 1993) was the eighth edition of the Pan American Badminton Championships. The tournament was held from 28 June to 4 July at the Guatemala National Badminton Hall inside Coliseo Deportivo in Guatemala City, Guatemala. Nine countries competed in the championships.

With the absence of Canada and the United States, Peru took the opportunity and won gold in five events. Debra O'Connor won Trinidad and Tobago's first gold medal in the Pan American championships when she defeated Maria Teresa Montero of Peru in the women's singles final. Barbados and Brazil also won their first few medals in this edition of the championships.

== Medal summary ==
=== Medalists ===
Event	Gold	Silver	Bronze
Men's singles	(Peru) Mario Carulla	(Peru) José Iturriaga	(Mexico) Ernesto de la Torre
Men's singles	(Peru) Mario Carulla	(Peru) José Iturriaga	(Guatemala) Kenneth Erichsen
Women's singles	(Trinidad and Tobago) Debra O'Connor	(Peru) Maria Teresa Montero	(Guatemala) Rosabel Vasquez
Women's singles	(Trinidad and Tobago) Debra O'Connor	(Peru) Maria Teresa Montero	(Guatemala) Mercedes Pierola
Men's doubles	(Peru) Mario Carulla (Peru) José Iturriaga	(Peru) Gustavo Salazar (Peru) Federico Valdez	(Barbados) Argyle Maynard (Peru) Germán Valdez
Men's doubles	(Peru) Mario Carulla (Peru) José Iturriaga	(Peru) Gustavo Salazar (Peru) Federico Valdez	(Brazil) Paulo Fam (Brazil) Leandro Santos
Women's doubles	(Peru) Silvia Jiménez (Peru) Maria Teresa Montero	(Trinidad and Tobago) Debra O’Connor (Barbados) Caroline Vaughn	(Guatemala) Mercedes Pierola (Guatemala) Monica Rossil
Women's doubles	(Peru) Silvia Jiménez (Peru) Maria Teresa Montero	(Trinidad and Tobago) Debra O’Connor (Barbados) Caroline Vaughn	(Mexico) Laura Amaya (Mexico) Ana Laura de la Torre
Mixed doubles	(Peru) Gustavo Salazar (Peru) Maria Teresa Montero	(Guatemala) Kenneth Erichsen (Trinidad and Tobago) Debra O’Connor	(Barbados) Argyle Maynard (Barbados) Caroline Vaughn
Mixed doubles	(Peru) Gustavo Salazar (Peru) Maria Teresa Montero	(Guatemala) Kenneth Erichsen (Trinidad and Tobago) Debra O’Connor	(Peru) José Antonio Iturriaga (Peru) Silvia Jiménez
Mixed team	Peru; Mario Carulla; José Iturriaga; Gustavo Salazar; Federico Valdez; Germán Valdez; Lorena Blanco; Silvia Jiménez; Maria Teresa Montero	Guatemala; Moises Altalef; Erick Anguiano; Raul Anguiano (badminton); Leonel Barrios; Christian Erichsen; Kenneth Erichsen; Raúl Martínez; Perez; Renato Rosales; José María Solis; Pedro Yang; Lesbia Arreaga; Magda Arreaga; Analise Fernández; Ilse Haussler; Mercedes Pierola; Monica Rossil; Paola Rossil; Rosabel Vasquez	Mexico; Ernesto de la Torre; Fernando de la Torre; Luis Lopezllera; Guadalupe Ambriz; Laura Amaya; Ana Laura de la Torre

=== Medal table ===
* Host nation (Guatemala)

Rank	Nation	Gold	Silver	Bronze	Total
1	Peru	5	3	1.5	9.5
2	Trinidad and Tobago	1	1	0	2
3	Guatemala*	0	1.5	4	5.5
4	Barbados	0	0.5	1.5	2
5	Mexico	0	0	3	3
6	Brazil	0	0	1	1
Totals (6 entries)		6	6	11	23

== Individual results ==
=== Men's singles ===
Semi-finals
(Peru) Mario Carulla	15	15
(Mexico) Ernesto de la Torre	7	1
(Peru) José Iturriaga	15	15
(Guatemala) Kenneth Erichsen	10	8

Final
(Peru) Mario Carulla	10	15	15
(Peru) José Iturriaga	15	4	7

=== Women's singles ===
Semi-finals
(Trinidad and Tobago) Debra O'Connor	11	11
(Guatemala) Rosabel Vasquez	0	1
(Guatemala) Mercedes Pierola	6	11	8
(Peru) Maria Teresa Montero	11	8	11

Final
(Trinidad and Tobago) Debra O'Connor	11	4	12
(Peru) Maria Teresa Montero	3	11	9

=== Men's doubles ===
Semi-finals
(Peru) Mario Carulla (Peru) José Iturriaga	15	15
(Barbados) Argyle Maynard (Peru) Germán Valdéz	3	8
(Brazil) Paulo Fam (Brazil) Leandro Santos	0	2
(Peru) Gustavo Salazar (Peru) Federico Valdez	15	15

Final
(Peru) Mario Carulla (Peru) José Iturriaga	15	15
(Peru) Gustavo Salazar (Peru) Federico Valdez	1	11

=== Women's doubles ===
Semi-finals
(Trinidad and Tobago) Debra O'Connor (Barbados) Caroline Vaughn	15	15
(Guatemala) Mercedes Pierola (Guatemala) Monica Rossil	4	6
(Mexico) Laura Amaya (Mexico) Ana Laura de la Torre	3	8
(Peru) Silvia Jimenez (Peru) Maria Teresa Montero	15	15

Final
(Trinidad and Tobago) Debra O'Connor (Barbados) Caroline Vaughn	5	11
(Peru) Silvia Jimenez (Peru) Maria Teresa Montero	15	15

=== Mixed doubles ===
Semi-finals
(Peru) Gustavo Salazar (Peru) Maria Teresa Montero	15	15
(Barbados) Argyle Maynard (Barbados) Caroline Vaughn	5	1
(Peru) José Iturriaga (Peru) Silvia Jimenez	6	15	10
(Guatemala) Kenneth Erichsen (Trinidad and Tobago) Debra O'Connor	15	6	15

Final
(Peru) Gustavo Salazar (Peru) Maria Teresa Montero	9	15	15
(Guatemala) Kenneth Erichsen (Trinidad and Tobago) Debra O'Connor	15	4	5

== Team event ==
=== Round robin ===
Only four teams competed in the mixed team championships, the tournament was played in a round robin format. Guatemala beat Mexico 3–2 and later defeated Brazil 5–0 to secure their chances of winning gold and silver. Peru defeated Mexico and Brazil 5–0. In the match for third place, Mexico beat Brazil 5–0 for bronze. Peru won their first ever mixed team title after beating Guatemala 3–2 in a grueling final encounter.

Pos	Team	Pld	W	L	MF	MA	MD	Pts	Qualification
1	Peru	3	3	0	13	2	+11	3	Champions
2	Guatemala	3	2	1	10	5	+5	2	Runners-up
3	Mexico	3	1	2	7	8	−1	1	Third place
4	Brazil	3	0	3	0	15	−15	0	Fourth place

Guatemala	3–2	Mexico
Guatemala	5–0	Brazil
Peru	5–0	Mexico
Peru	5–0	Brazil
Peru	3–2	Guatemala
Mexico	5–0	Brazil
