= Berónica Vibieca =

Dominican Republic badminton player (born 1990)

Personal information
- Born: Nieve Berónica Vibieca Aquino; 6 January 1990 (age 36)
- Height: 1.73 m (5 ft 8 in)

Sport
- Country: Dominican Republic
- Sport: Badminton

Women's singles & doubles
- Highest ranking: 107 (WS 31 October 2013); 96 (WD 19 January 2012); 74 (XD 26 February 2015)
- BWF profile
Medal record
Women's badminton
Representing Dominican Republic
Central American and Caribbean Games
Bronze medal – third place	2010 Mayagüez	Women's team
Bronze medal – third place	2014 Veracruz	Women's singles

Nieve Berónica Vibieca Aquino (born 6 January 1990) is a Dominican Republic badminton player.

== Career ==
In 2013, she won the Guatemala International tournament in women's singles events, and became the runner-up in women's and mixed doubles. She also won the Carebaco International tournament in the women's doubles event partnered with Daigenis Saturria.

== Achievements ==
=== Central American and Caribbean Games ===
Women's singles
Year	Venue	Opponent	Score	Result
2014	Omega Complex; Veracruz, Mexico	(Mexico) Haramara Gaitan	10–21, 15–21	Bronze

=== BWF International Challenge/Series ===
Women's singles
Year	Tournament	Opponent	Score	Result
2013	Guatemala International	(Peru) Daniela Macías	21–17, 21–15	(gold) Winner

Women's doubles
Year	Tournament	Partner	Opponent	Score	Result
2011	Santo Domingo Open	(Dominican Republic) Orosameli Cabrera	(Greece) Anne Hald Jensen (France) Barbara Matias	8–21, 8–21	(silver) Runner-up
2013	Venezuela International	(Dominican Republic) Daigenis Saturria	(Guatemala) Ana de León (Guatemala) Nikté Sotomayor	22–24, 18–21	(silver) Runner-up
2013	Guatemala International	(Dominican Republic) Daigenis Saturria	(Guatemala) Krisley López (Guatemala) Nikté Sotomayor	18–21, 19–21	(silver) Runner-up
2013	Carebaco International	(Dominican Republic) Daigenis Saturria	(Puerto Rico) Saribel Cáceres (Puerto Rico) Génesis Valentín	21–18, 21–12	(gold) Winner
2014	Santo Domingo Open	(Dominican Republic) Daigenis Saturria	(Peru) Daniela Macías (Peru) Dánica Nishimura	21–14, 18–21, 16–21	(silver) Runner-up

Mixed doubles
Year	Tournament	Partner	Opponent	Score	Result
2012	Carebaco International	(Dominican Republic) Nelson Javier	(Suriname) Mitchel Wongsodikromo (Suriname) Crystal Leefmans	11–21, 21–17, 21–13	(gold) Winner
2013	Giraldilla International	(Dominican Republic) Nelson Javier	(Mexico) Lino Muñoz (Mexico) Cynthia González	19–21, 27–25, 12–21	(silver) Runner-up
2013	Venezuela International	(Dominican Republic) Nelson Javier	(Guatemala) Heymard Humblers (Guatemala) Nikté Sotomayor	20–22, 21–17, 18–21	(silver) Runner-up
2013	Guatemala International	(Dominican Republic) Nelson Javier	(Guatemala) Jonathan Solís (Guatemala) Nikté Sotomayor	11–21, 21–19, 19–21	(silver) Runner-up
2014	Santo Domingo Open	(Dominican Republic) Nelson Javier	(Austria) David Obernosterer (Austria) Elisabeth Baldauf	17–21, 15–21	(silver) Runner-up
2014	Puerto Rico International	(Dominican Republic) Nelson Javier	(Peru) Andrés Corpancho (Peru) Luz María Zornoza	19–21, 16–21	(silver) Runner-up

BWF International Challenge tournament
BWF International Series tournament
BWF Future Series tournament
