= Raymond Dalmau Coliseum =

Sports venue in Quebradillas, Puerto Rico

Coordinates: 18°27′42″N 66°55′44″W

- "La Guarida del Pirata"
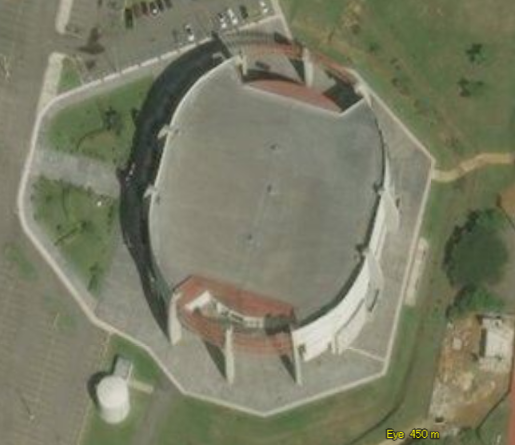
- Interactive map of Raymond Dalmau Coliseum
- Location: Highway 2 Quebradillas, Puerto Rico 00678
- Owner: City of Quebradillas
- Operator: City of Quebradillas
- Capacity: 6130

Construction
- Opened: 2008
- Cost: $25 million

Tenant
- Piratas de Quebradillas (BSN) (?–present)

Raymond Dalmau Coliseum is a multi-purpose indoor arena located in Quebradillas, Puerto Rico. The coliseum is home to the Piratas de Quebradillas, which competes in Puerto Rico's Baloncesto Superior Nacional. The Coliseum had its grand opening in 2008, hosted by Puerto Rican governor Aníbal Acevedo Vilá and the mayor of Quebradillas, Heriberto Vélez Vélez. Basketball and badminton events for the 2010 Central American and Caribbean Games were held in this coliseum.
