= Badminton at the 2010 Central American and Caribbean Games =

Event held in Mayagüez, Puerto Rico

Tournament details
- Dates: 18–23 July
- Edition: 4
- Venue: Raymond Dalmau Coliseum
- Location: Mayagüez, Puerto Rico

The Badminton competition at the 2010 Central American and Caribbean Games was being held in Mayagüez, Puerto Rico. The tournament was scheduled to be held from 18 to 23 July at the Raymond Dalmau Coliseum in Porta del Sol. It was the fourth appearance for badminton at the Games.

Badminton Mascot at Mayagüez 2010

== Medal summary ==
=== Men's events ===
Event	Gold	Silver	Bronze
Singles	Kevin Cordón (GUA)	Pedro Yang (GUA)	Gareth Henry (JAM); Rodolfo Ramirez (GUA)
Doubles	Guatemala (GUA); Kevin Cordon; Rodolfo Ramirez	Mexico (MEX); Andres Lopez; Lino Munoz	Jamaica (JAM); Gareth Henry; Garron Palmer; Suriname (SUR); Virgil Soeroredjo; Mitchel Wongsodikromo
Team	Guatemala (GUA); Kevin Cordon; Rodolfo Ramirez; Jonathan Solis; Pedro Yang	Jamaica (JAM); Kashif Ramon Bernard; Gareth Henry; Garron Palmer; Charles Pyne	Mexico (MEX); Job Castillo; Andres Lopez; Lino Munoz; Salvador Sanchez; Trinidad and Tobago (TRI); Keston Friday; Kerwyn Pantin; Rahul Rampersad; Anil Seepaul

=== Women's events ===
Event	Gold	Silver	Bronze
Singles	Victoria Montero (MEX)	Cynthia Gonzalez (MEX)	Mariana Ugalde (MEX); Haramara Gaitan (MEX)
Doubles	Mexico (MEX); Victoria Montero; Cynthia Gonzalez	Puerto Rico (PUR); Jaylene Forrester; Keara Gonzalez	Mexico; Mariana Ugalde; Haramara Gaitan; Puerto Rico (PUR); Irytsha Gonzalez; Daneysha Santana
Team	Mexico (MEX); Haramara Gaitan; Cynthia Gonzalez; Victoria Montero; Mariana Ugalde	Puerto Rico (PUR); Jaylene Forrester; Irytsha Gonzalez; Keara Gonzalez; Daneysha Santana	Guatemala (GUA); Maria Regina del Valle; Maria Natalia Flores; Kareen Morales; Nikte Alejandra Sotomayor; Dominican Republic (DOM); Orosameli Cabrera; Fiordaliza D' Óleo; Yomaira Sanchez; Berónica Vibieca

=== Mixed events ===
Event	Gold	Silver	Bronze
Doubles	Jamaica (JAM); Garron Palmer; Alya Lewis	Jamaica (JAM); Gareth Henry; Kristal Karjohn	Guatemala; Rodolfo Ramirez; Nikte Alejandra Sotomayor; Mexico; Andres Lopez; Victoria Montero

== Medal table ==
* Host nation (Puerto Rico)

Rank	Nation	Gold	Silver	Bronze	Total
1	Mexico (MEX)	3	2	5	10
2	Guatemala (GUA)	3	1	3	7
3	Jamaica (JAM)	1	2	2	5
4	Puerto Rico (PUR)*	0	2	1	3
5	Dominican Republic (DOM)	0	0	1	1
5	Suriname (SUR)	0	0	1	1
5	Trinidad and Tobago (TRI)	0	0	1	1
Totals (7 entries)		7	7	14	28

== Results ==
Men's singles

Semifinals
(Guatemala) Kevin Cordón	21	21
(Jamaica) Gareth Henry	7	11
(Guatemala) Rodolfo Ramirez	21	18	17
(Guatemala) Pedro Yang	14	21	21

Final
(Guatemala) Kevin Cordón	21	21
(Guatemala) Pedro Yang	15	12

Women's singles

Semifinals
(Mexico) Mariana Ugalde	17	23	15
(Mexico) Cynthia Gonzalez	21	21	21
(Mexico) Haramara Gaitan	19	17
(Mexico) Victoria Montero	21	21

Final
(Mexico) Cynthia Gonzalez	10	12
(Mexico) Victoria Montero	21	21

Men's doubles

Semifinals
(Guatemala) Kevin Cordón (Guatemala) Rodolfo Ramirez	21	21
(Jamaica) Gareth Henry (Jamaica) Garron Palmer	12	17
(Suriname) Virgil Soeroredjo (Suriname) Mitchel Wongsodikromo	14	17
(Mexico) Andrés López (Mexico) Lino Muñoz	21	21

Final
(Guatemala) Kevin Cordón (Guatemala) Rodolfo Ramirez	18	21	21
(Mexico) Andrés López (Mexico) Lino Muñoz	21	17	6

Women's doubles

Semifinals
(Puerto Rico) Jaylene Forrester (Puerto Rico) Keara Gonzalez	21	21
(Mexico) Haramara Gaitan (Mexico) Mariana Ugalde	19	18
(Puerto Rico) Irytsha González (Puerto Rico) Daneysha Santana	21	9	7
(Mexico) Cynthia Gonzalez (Mexico) Victoria Montero	13	21	21

Final
(Puerto Rico) Jaylene Forrester (Puerto Rico) Keara Gonzalez	12	12
(Mexico) Cynthia Gonzalez (Mexico) Victoria Montero	21	21

Men's team

Semi-finals
19 July – Raymond Dalmau Coliseum
Guatemala	3
Mexico	1
19 July – Raymond Dalmau Coliseum
Jamaica	3
Trinidad and Tobago	1

Final
19 July – Raymond Dalmau Coliseum
Guatemala	3
Jamaica	1

Women's team

Semi-finals
19 July – Raymond Dalmau Coliseum
Mexico	3
Guatemala	0
19 July – Raymond Dalmau Coliseum
Puerto Rico	3
Dominican Republic	0

Final
19 July – Raymond Dalmau Coliseum
Mexico	3
Puerto Rico	0

Mixed doubles

Semifinals
(Guatemala) Rodolfo Ramirez (Guatemala) Nikte Sotomayor	21	9	15
(Jamaica) Gareth Henry (Jamaica) Kristal Karjohn	18	21	21
(Jamaica) Garron Palmer (Jamaica) Alya Lewis	21	15	21
(Mexico) Andrés López (Mexico) Victoria Montero	11	21	14

Final
(Jamaica) Gareth Henry (Jamaica) Kristal Karjohn	14	15
(Jamaica) Garron Palmer (Jamaica) Alya Lewis	21	21

== Participants ==
Country	Men's	DoB/Age	Women's	DoB/Age	Total athletes
Barbados (BAR)	Ryan Holder; Andre Padmore; Dakeil Thorpe; Kevin Wood	26 September 1975 (aged 34); 16 February 1982 (aged 28); 12 September 1989 (aged 20); 4 April 1981 (aged 29)	Mariana Eastmond; Sabrina Scott; Tamisha Williams	17 January 1983 (aged 27); 24 February 1986 (aged 24); 29 November 1982 (aged 27)	7
El Salvador (ESA)	Gerson Ricardo Diaz Siz; José Ernesto Molina Abrego	19 February 1987 (aged 23); 2 January 1990 (aged 20)	–	–	2
Guatemala (GUA)	Kevin Cordon; Rodolfo Ramirez; Jonathan Solis; Pedro Yang	28 November 1986 (aged 23); 31 July 1988 (aged 21); 21 August 1993 (aged 16); 9 October 1976 (aged 33)	Maria Regina del Valle; Maria Natalia Flores; Kareen Morales; Nikte Alejandra Sotomayor	24 March 1991 (aged 19); 25 December 1993 (aged 16); 6 January 1992 (aged 18); 1 July 1994 (aged 16)	8
Jamaica (JAM)	Kashif Ramon Bernard; Gareth Henry; Garron Palmer; Charler Pyne	17 April 1985 (aged 25); 10 August 1991 (aged 18); 19 August 1984 (aged 25); 6 April 1981 (aged 29)	Kristal Karjohn; Alya Lewis; Christine Denise Leyow Mayne	13 August 1984 (aged 25); 29 January 1980 (aged 30); 24 December 1971 (aged 38)	7
Mexico (MEX)	Job Castillo; Andrés López; Lino Muñoz; Salvador Sánchez Martínez	1 November 1992 (aged 17); 9 May 1992 (aged 18); 8 February 1991 (aged 19); 12 July 1984 (aged 26)	Haramara Gaitan; Cynthia Gonzalez; Victoria Montero; Mariana Ugalde	7 August 1996 (aged 13); 29 June 1992 (aged 18); 25 August 1991 (aged 18); 7 January 1993 (aged 17)	8
Puerto Rico (PUR)	Fred Hernandez Mendez; José Carlos Mercado Lugo; Héctor M. Ríos Vera; Aleandro Román Solá	10 May 1983 (aged 27); 4 March 1991 (aged 19); 6 June 1991 (aged 19); 23 January 1995 (aged 15)	Jaylene Forrester Babilonia; Keara González Sánchez; Irytsha González; Daneysha Santana Quiñones	9 December 1993 (aged 16); 2 November 1991 (aged 18); 25 March 1993 (aged 17); 9 January 1994 (aged 16)	8
Dominican Republic (DOM)	William Cabrera José; Freddy José López del Orbe; Nelson Javier Ozuna; Alberto Raposo Jiménez	16 October 1992 (aged 17); 2 August 1990 (aged 19); 19 January 1985 (aged 25); 16 November 1987 (aged 22)	Orosameli Cabrera José; Marys Fiordaliza de Oleo Reyes; Yomaira Elizabeth Sánchez Feliz; Nieve Berónica Vibieca Aquino	14 January 1989 (aged 21); 21 August 1986 (aged 23); 20 July 1984 (aged 25); 6 January 1990 (aged 20)	8
Suriname (SUR)	Dylan Darmohoetomo; Irfan Djabar; Virgil Soeroredjo; Mitchel Wongsodikromo	22 December 1992 (aged 17); 10 April 1992 (aged 18); 11 March 1985 (aged 25); 26 August 1985 (aged 24)	–	–	4
Trinidad and Tobago (TRI)	Keston Friday; Kerwyn Pantin; Rahul Rampersad; Anil Seepaul	– 6 August 1983 (aged 26); 10 March 1986 (aged 24); 1 December 1975 (aged 34)	Nekeisha Blake; Jade Joseph; Avril Anna-Marie Plaza	3 July 1987 (aged 23) – –	7
