= Debra O'Connor =

Trinidad and Tobago badminton player

Personal information
- Nationality: Trinidad and Tobago
- Born: 4 July 1966 (age 59); Jamaica

Sport
- Sport: Badminton

Debra Ann O'Connor (born 4 July 1966) is a Trinidad and Tobago badminton player born in Jamaica. She competed in women's singles at the 1996 Summer Olympics in Atlanta. She was a record ten times winner of the Women's Singles event at the Carebaco Games Caribbean Regional Badminton Championships. (1983 - 1987, 1990, 1992-1993, & 1995-1996). She also won the Women's Doubles Carebaco event nine times for Trinidad & Tobago and the Mixed Doubles event 3 times (1983, 1986 & 1990).
