= Jamaica national badminton team =

National badminton team representing Jamaica

Jamaica
- Association: Jamaica Badminton Association (JBA)
- Confederation: BPA (Africa)
- President: Vishwanauth Tolan

BWF ranking
- Current ranking: 60 (2 April 2024)
- Highest ranking: 54 (5 April 2012)

Sudirman Cup
- Appearances: 3 (first in 1997)
- Best result: Group stage

Pan Am Mixed Team Championships
- Appearances: 7 (first in 1987)
- Best result: Third place (1993)

Pan Am Men's Team Championships
- Appearances: 1 (first in 2018)
- Best result: Third place (2018)

The Jamaica national badminton team represents Jamaica in international badminton team competitions. It is controlled by the Jamaica Badminton Association, the governing body for badminton in Jamaica. The Jamaican mixed team participated three times in the Sudirman Cup and were eliminated in the group stages.

The Jamaican mixed team also finished in fourth place at the 2016 Pan Am Badminton Championships. The national team's best result was achieving a third place position at the 2018 Pan Am Badminton Championships after defeating Peru in the bronze medal tie with a score of 3-0.

== Competitive record ==
=== Thomas Cup ===
Year	Round	Pos
1949	Did not enter	
1952	Did not enter	
1955	Did not enter	
1958	Did not enter	
1961	Did not enter	
1964	Did not qualify	
1967	Did not qualify	
1970	Did not qualify	
1973	Did not enter	
1976	Did not enter	
1979	Did not enter	
1982	Did not enter	
1984	Did not enter	
1986	Did not qualify	
1988	Did not enter	
1990	Did not enter	
1992	Did not qualify	
1994	Did not enter	
1996	Did not qualify	
1998	Did not enter	
2000	Did not enter	
2002	Did not qualify	
2004	Did not enter	
2006	Did not qualify	
2008	Did not enter	
2010	Did not qualify	
2012	Did not qualify	
2014	Did not enter	
2016	Did not enter	
2018	Did not qualify	
2020	Did not enter	
2022	Did not enter	
2024	Did not enter	
2026	Did not enter	
2028	To be determined	
2030	To be determined	

=== Uber Cup ===
Year	Round	Pos
1957 to 1984	Did not enter	
1986	Did not qualify	
1988	Did not enter	
1990	Did not enter	
1992	Did not enter	
1994	Did not enter	
1996	Did not enter	
1998	Did not enter	
2000	Did not enter	
2002	Did not enter	
2004	Did not enter	
2006	Did not enter	
2008	Did not enter	
2010	Did not qualify	
2012	Did not enter	
2014	Did not enter	
2016	Did not enter	
2018	Did not enter	
2020	Did not enter	
2022	Did not enter	
2024	Did not enter	
2026	Did not enter	
2028	To be determined	
2030	To be determined	

=== Sudirman Cup ===
Year	Round	Pos
1989	Did not enter	
1991	Did not enter	
1993	Did not enter	
1995	Did not enter	
1997	Group stage	43rd
1999	Did not enter	
2001	Did not enter	
2003	Group stage	47th
2005	Group stage	40th
2007	Did not enter	
2009	Did not enter	
2011	Did not enter	
2013	Did not enter	
2015	Did not enter	
2017	Did not enter	
2019	Did not enter	
2021	Did not enter	
2023	Did not enter	
2025	To be determined	
2027	To be determined	
2029	To be determined	

=== Pan American Team Championships ===
==== Men's team ====
Year	Round	Pos
2016	Did not enter	
2018	Third place	3rd
2020	Did not enter	
2022	Did not enter	
2024	Did not enter	
2026	To be determined	
2028	To be determined	
2030	To be determined	

==== Women's team ====
Year	Round	Pos
2016	Did not enter	
2018	Did not enter	
2020	Did not enter	
2022	Did not enter	
2024	Withdrew	
2026	To be determined	
2028	To be determined	
2030	To be determined	

==== Mixed team ====
Year	Round	Pos
1977	Did not enter	
1978	Did not enter	
1979	Did not enter	
1980	Did not enter	
1987	Fourth place	4th
1989	Fourth place	4th
1991	Third place	3rd
1993	Did not enter	
1997	Group stage	5th
2001	Did not enter	
2004	Did not enter	
2005	Did not enter	
2007	Did not enter	
2008	Did not enter	
2009	Did not enter	
2010	Did not enter	
2012	Did not enter	
2013	Group stage	8th
2014	Did not enter	
2016	Fourth place	4th
2017	Did not enter	
2019	Group stage	10th
2023	Did not enter	
2025	To be determined	
2027	To be determined	
2029	To be determined	

=== Central American and Caribbean Games ===
==== Men's team ====
Year	Round	Pos
2010	Runners-up	2nd

==== Women's team ====
Year	Round	Pos
2010	Group stage	

==== Mixed team ====
Year	Round	Pos
1990	Runners-up	2nd
1993	Did not enter	
2006	Fourth place	4th
2014	Group stage	
2018	Group stage	
2023	Third place	3rd

=== CAREBACO Team Championships ===
==== Mixed team ====
Year	Round	Pos
1972	Champions	1st
1973	Champions	1st
1974	Champions	1st
1975	Champions	1st
1976	Champions	1st
1978	Champions	1st
1979	Champions	1st
1980	Champions	1st
1981	Champions	1st
1982	Champions	1st
1983	Did not enter	
1984	Did not enter	
1985	Did not enter	
1986	Champions	1st
1987	Champions	1st
1988	Did not enter	
1990	Did not enter	
1992	Champions	1st
1993	Champions	1st
1995	Champions	1st
1996	Champions	1st
1997	Champions	1st
1998	Third place	3rd
1999	Champions	1st
2000	Champions	1st
2001	Champions	1st
2002	Did not enter	
2003	Did not enter	
2004	Did not enter	
2005	Did not enter	
2011	Did not enter	
2012	Did not enter	
2014	Runners-up	2nd
2015	Champions	1st
2016	Did not enter	
2017	Champions	1st
2018	Did not enter	

**Red border color indicates tournament was held on home soil.

== Junior competitive record ==
=== Suhandinata Cup ===
Year	Round	Pos
2000 to 2024	Did not enter	
2025	To be determined	

=== Pan American Junior Team Championships ===
==== Mixed team ====
Year	Round	Pos
1977	Fifth place	5th
1978	Fifth place	5th
1979	Did not enter	
1980	Did not enter	
1981	Did not enter	
1988	Did not enter	
1990	Did not enter	
1991	Did not enter	
1992	Did not enter	
1994	Runners-up	2nd
1996	Group stage	6th
1998	Third place	3rd
2000	Did not enter	
2002	Did not enter	
2004	Group stage	6th
2006	Group stage	
2007	Group stage	8th
2008	Group stage	5th
2009	Group stage	5th
2010	Group stage	6th
2011	Group stage	6th
2012	Group stage	6th
2013	Quarter-finals	5th
2014	Did not enter	
2015	Group stage	5th
2016	Quarter-finals	8th
2017	Did not enter	
2018	Did not enter	
2019	Did not enter	
2021	Did not enter	
2022	Did not enter	
2023	Did not enter	
2024	Did not enter	
2025	Group stage	8th
2026	Group stage	6th

=== CAREBACO Junior Team Championships ===
==== Mixed team ====
Year	Round	Pos
1976	Champions	1st
1978	Champions	1st
1979	Champions	1st
1980	Runners-up	2nd
1981	Runners-up	2nd
1982	Champions	1st
1983	Champions	1st
1984	Runners-up	2nd
1985	Did not enter	
1986	Runners-up	2nd
1987	Champions	1st
1988	Champions	1st
1990	Champions	1st
1992	Champions	1st
1993	Champions	1st
1995	Champions	1st
1996	Did not enter	
1997	Champions	1st
1998	Champions	1st
1999	Did not enter	
2000	Runners-up	2nd
2001	Runners-up	2nd
2002	Runners-up	2nd
2004	Runners-up	2nd
2005	Runners-up	2nd
2007	Runners-up	2nd
2011	Did not enter	
2012	Did not enter	
2013	Did not enter	
2014	Champions	1st
2015	Runners-up	2nd
2016	Did not enter	
2017	Runners-up	2nd
2025	Runners-up	3rd

**Red border color indicates tournament was held on home soil.

== Players ==
=== Current squad ===
As of 2 January 2024

==== Men's team ====
Name	DoB/Age	Ranking of event		
Name	DoB/Age	MS	MD	XD
Samuel Ricketts	25 April 1996 (age 30)	146	180	86
Bradley Evans	20 December 2000 (age 25)	329	180	539
Joel Angus	31 May 2000 (age 26)	827	511	958
Amir McBean	29 January 2010 (age 16)			

==== Women's team ====
Name	DoB/Age	Ranking of event		
Name	DoB/Age	WS	WD	XD
Tahlia Richardson	26 June 2001 (age 25)	183	204	86
Breanna Bisnott	26 November 2003 (age 22)			
Mikaelah Mustafaa	19 May 2003 (age 23)	682	435	958
Rihanna Rust	11 September 2006 (age 19)	682	435	958
