= 2020 Pan Am Badminton Championships =

Tournament details
- Dates: 13–16 February (Team event); ~~23–26 April 2021 (Individual event)~~
- Edition: 24
- Venue: Centro Pan-Americano de Judô (Team event); ~~Gimanasio El Sagrado Corazon de Jesus (Individual event)~~
- Location: Salvador, Bahia, Brazil (Team event); ~~Guatemala City, Guatemala (Individual event)~~

The XXIV 2020 Pan Am Badminton Championships is a continental championships tournament of badminton in Pan America. This tournament were held as two events in different countries. From 13 to 16 February, the team event was held in Salvador, Bahia, Brazil. From 23 to 26 April, the individual event was planned to be held in Guatemala City, Guatemala.

== Tournament ==
The team event of 2020 Pan Am Badminton Championships officially Pan Am Male & Female Cup 2020, is a continental stage tournament of 2020 Thomas & Uber Cup, and also to crown the best men's and women's badminton team in Pan America. This event organized by the Badminton Pan Am and Confederação Brasileira de Badminton. 13 teams, consisting of 6 men's teams and 7 women's teams entered the tournament.

The individual event of 2020 Pan Am Badminton Championships was planned to be held from 23 to 26 April in Guatemala City, Guatemala, but later the tournament was moved to Lima, Peru. The Championships then were suspended in 2020 due to the COVID-19 pandemic, with competition in Lima eventually being cancelled.

=== Venue ===
- The team event is being held at Centro Pan-Americano de Judô in the city of Salvador, Bahia, Brazil.

== Medalists ==
Event	Gold	Silver	Bronze
Men's team	Canada; Phillipe Charron; Jason Ho-Shue; Joshua Hurlburt-Yu; Antonio Li; Maxime Tétreault; Nyl Yakura; Brian Yang	Mexico; Andrés López; Arturo Joel Angeles Garcia; Job Castillo; Sebastian de la Torre; Sebastian Martinez Cardoso; Luis Montoya; Lino Muñoz	United States; Phillip Chew; Ryan Chew; Vinson Chiu; Kyle Emerick; Timothy Lam; Sattawat Pongnairat; Howard Shu; Ryan Zheng
Women's team	Canada; Jacqueline Cheung; Catherine Choi; Rachel Honderich; Michelle Li; Kyleigh O'Donoghue; Brittney Tam; Kristen Tsai; Zhang Wen Yu	United States; Chen Kuei-ya; Natalie Chi; Francesca Corbett; Chinue De La Merced; Allison Lee; Sanchita Pandey; Esther Shi; Katherine Tor	Brazil; Jeisiane Alves; Mariana Pedrol Freitas; Bianca de Oliveira Lima; Jaqueline Lima; Sâmia Lima; Sania Lima; Jackeline Luz; Tamires Santos; Fabiana Silva; Juliana Viana Vieira

=== Medal table ===
* Host nation (Brazil)

Rank	Nation	Gold	Silver	Bronze	Total
1	Canada	2	0	0	2
2	United States	0	1	1	2
3	Mexico	0	1	0	1
4	Brazil*	0	0	1	1
Totals (4 entries)		2	2	2	6

== Team events ==
=== Men's team ===
==== Group A ====
Pos	Team	Pld	W	L	MF	MA	MD	GF	GA	GD	PF	PA	PD	Pts	Qualification
1	Canada	2	2	0	7	3	+4	15	7	+8	437	375	+62	2	Semifinals
2	Mexico	2	1	1	5	5	0	9	11	−2	342	363	−21	1	Semifinals
3	Brazil	2	0	2	3	7	−4	8	14	−6	368	409	−41	0	5th place

Source: TS
- Canada vs. Brazil

Canada
3
Centro Pan-Americano de Judô
13 February 2020, 12:00 UTC−3

Brazil
2

			1	2	3
1	(Canada) (Brazil)	Jason Ho-Shue; Ygor Coelho	21; 12	19; 21	21; 10
2	(Canada) (Brazil)	Brian Yang; Vinicios Santos	19; 21	18; 21
3	(Canada) (Brazil)	Antonio Li; Jonathan Matias	21; 16	16; 21	15; 21
4	(Canada) (Brazil)	Jason Ho-Shue / Nyl Yakura; Fabricio Farias / Francielton Farias	21; 18	21; 14
5	(Canada) (Brazil)	Phillipe Charron / Maxime Tétreault; Ygor Coelho / Jonathan Matias	21; 15	21; 18

- Mexico vs. Brazil

Mexico
4
Centro Pan-Americano de Judô
13 February 2020, 18:00 UTC−3

Brazil
1

			1	2	3
1	(Mexico) (Brazil)	Lino Muñoz; Ygor Coelho	21; 16	21; 19
2	(Mexico) (Brazil)	Job Castillo; Vinicios Santos	21; 16	13; 21	21; 6
3	(Mexico) (Brazil)	Luis Montoya; Jonathan Matias	23; 21	21; 19
4	(Mexico) (Brazil)	Job Castillo / Lino Muñoz; Ygor Coelho / Jonathan Matias	2; 0			retired
5	(Mexico) (Brazil)	Andrés López / Luis Montoya; Fabricio Farias / Francielton Farias	16; 21	16; 21

- Canada vs. Mexico

Canada
4
Centro Pan-Americano de Judô
14 February 2020, 12:00 UTC−3

Mexico
1

			1	2	3
1	(Canada) (Mexico)	Jason Ho-Shue; Lino Muñoz	20; 22	15; 21
2	(Canada) (Mexico)	Brian Yang; Job Castillo	21; 13	21; 17
3	(Canada) (Mexico)	Antonio Li; Arturo Joel Angeles Garcia	21; 13	21; 13
4	(Canada) (Mexico)	Jason Ho-Shue / Nyl Yakura; Andrés López / Luis Montoya	21; 18	21; 15
5	(Canada) (Mexico)	Phillipe Charron / Maxime Tétreault; Arturo Joel Angeles Garcia / Sebastian Martinez Cardoso	21; 19	21; 16

==== Group B ====
Pos	Team	Pld	W	L	MF	MA	MD	GF	GA	GD	PF	PA	PD	Pts	Qualification
1	United States	2	2	0	8	2	+6	17	5	+12	442	365	+77	2	Semifinals
2	Guatemala	2	1	1	5	5	0	13	12	+1	455	449	+6	1	Semifinals
3	Peru	2	0	2	2	8	−6	5	18	−13	373	476	−103	0	5th place

Source: TS
- United States vs. Peru

United States
5
Centro Pan-Americano de Judô
13 February 2020, 12:00 UTC−3

Peru
0

			1	2	3
1	(United States) (Peru)	Howard Shu; José Guevara	21; 12	21; 11
2	(United States) (Peru)	Timothy Lam; Daniel la Torre Regal	27; 25	21; 14
3	(United States) (Peru)	Vinson Chiu; Nicolás Macías	21; 11	21; 16
4	(United States) (Peru)	Phillip Chew / Ryan Chew; José Guevara / Diego Mini	21; 16	21; 19
5	(United States) (Peru)	Kyle Emerick / Sattawat Pongnairat; Daniel la Torre Regal / Diego Subauste Tokumura	21; 14	21; 12

- Guatemala vs. Peru

Guatemala
3
Centro Pan-Americano de Judô
13 February 2020, 18:00 UTC−3

Peru
2

			1	2	3
1	(Guatemala) (Peru)	Kevin Cordón; José Guevara	21; 16	21; 16
2	(Guatemala) (Peru)	Rubén Castellanos; Daniel la Torre Regal	21; 14	17; 21	14; 21
3	(Guatemala) (Peru)	Christopher Martínez; Nicolás Macías	20; 22	21; 19	9; 21
4	(Guatemala) (Peru)	Jonathan Solís / Aníbal Marroquín; José Guevara / Diego Mini	21; 16	21; 11
5	(Guatemala) (Peru)	Rubén Castellanos / Christopher Martínez; Daniel la Torre Regal / Diego Subauste Tokumura	12; 21	21; 14	21; 11

- United States vs. Guatemala

United States
3
Centro Pan-Americano de Judô
14 February 2020, 12:00 UTC−3

Guatemala
2

			1	2	3
1	(United States) (Guatemala)	Howard Shu; Kevin Cordón	21; 19	18; 21	15; 21
2	(United States) (Guatemala)	Timothy Lam; Rubén Castellanos	21; 18	16; 21	21; 9
3	(United States) (Guatemala)	Ryan Zheng; Christopher Martínez	18; 21	12; 21
4	(United States) (Guatemala)	Phillip Chew / Ryan Chew; Jonathan Solís / Aníbal Marroquín	21; 15	21; 19
5	(United States) (Guatemala)	Vincent Chew / Sattawat Pongnairat; Rubén Castellanos / Christopher Martínez	21; 15	21; 15

==== Fifth place match ====
- Brazil vs. Peru

Brazil
3
Centro Pan-Americano de Judô
14 February 2020, 16:00 UTC−3

Peru
0

			1	2	3
1	(Brazil) (Peru)	Vinicios Santos; José Guevara	21; 15	21; 19
2	(Brazil) (Peru)	Jonathan Matias; Daniel la Torre Regal	21; 14	21; 6
3	(Brazil) (Peru)	Donnians Oliveira; Nicolás Macías	21; 9	21; 16
4	(Brazil) (Peru)	Fabricio Farias / Francielton Farias; José Guevara / Diego Mini				not played
5	(Brazil) (Peru)	Izak Batalha / Jonathan Matias; Nicolás Macías / Diego Subauste Tokumura				not played

==== First to fourth place ====
Semi-finals
15 February
Canada	3
Guatemala	1
15 February
Mexico	3
United States	1

Final
16 February
Canada	3
Mexico	1
Third place
15 February
Guatemala	0
United States	3

===== Semifinals =====
- Canada vs. Guatemala

Canada
3
Centro Pan-Americano de Judô
15 February 2020, 10:00 UTC−3

Guatemala
1

			1	2	3
1	(Canada) (Guatemala)	Jason Ho-Shue; Kevin Cordón	18; 21	15; 21
2	(Canada) (Guatemala)	Brian Yang; Rubén Castellanos	21; 16	21; 13
3	(Canada) (Guatemala)	Antonio Li; Christopher Martínez	22; 20	22; 20
4	(Canada) (Guatemala)	Joshua Hurlburt-Yu / Nyl Yakura; Jonathan Solís / Aníbal Marroquín	21; 14	21; 15
5	(Canada) (Guatemala)	Phillipe Charron / Maxime Tétreault; Rubén Castellanos / Christopher Martínez				not played

- Mexico vs. United States

Mexico
3
Centro Pan-Americano de Judô
15 February 2020, 10:00 UTC−3

United States
1

			1	2	3
1	(Mexico) (United States)	Lino Muñoz; Howard Shu	21; 13	21; 16
2	(Mexico) (United States)	Job Castillo; Timothy Lam	21; 17	17; 21	18; 21
3	(Mexico) (United States)	Luis Montoya; Sattawat Pongnairat	21; 13	14; 21	21; 16
4	(Mexico) (United States)	Andrés López / Luis Montoya; Phillip Chew / Ryan Chew	21; 19	21; 18
5	(Mexico) (United States)	Job Castillo / Lino Muñoz; Vinson Chu / Ryan Zheng				not played

===== Third place match =====
- Guatemala vs. United States

Guatemala
0
Centro Pan-Americano de Judô
15 February 2020, 15:00 UTC−3

United States
3

			1	2	3
1	(Guatemala) (United States)	Rubén Castellanos; Howard Shu	21; 15	22; 24	19; 21
2	(Guatemala) (United States)	Christopher Martínez; Timothy Lam	14; 21	8; 21
3	(Guatemala) (United States)	Aníbal Marroquín; Vinson Chiu	8; 21	20; 22
4	(Guatemala) (United States)	Rubén Castellanos / Christopher Martínez; Kyle Emerick / Ryan Zheng				not played
5	(Guatemala) (United States)	Jonathan Solís / Aníbal Marroquín; Phillip Chew / Ryan Chew				not played

===== Final =====
- Canada vs. Mexico

Canada
3
Centro Pan-Americano de Judô
16 February 2020, 10:00 UTC−3

Mexico
1

			1	2	3
1	(Canada) (Mexico)	Jason Ho-Shue; Lino Muñoz	21; 7	22; 20
2	(Canada) (Mexico)	Brian Yang; Job Castillo	21; 14	21; 19
3	(Canada) (Mexico)	Antonio Li; Luis Montoya	21; 16	19; 21	17; 21
4	(Canada) (Mexico)	Joshua Hurlburt-Yu / Brian Yang; Job Castillo / Lino Muñoz	22; 20	21; 16
5	(Canada) (Mexico)	Jason Ho-Shue / Nyl Yakura; Andrés López / Luis Montoya				not played

=== Women's team ===
==== Group A ====
Pos	Team	Pld	W	L	MF	MA	MD	GF	GA	GD	PF	PA	PD	Pts	Qualification
1	Canada	2	2	0	9	1	+8	19	2	+17	434	299	+135	2	Semifinals
2	Mexico	2	1	1	3	7	−4	6	14	−8	328	391	−63	1	Semifinals
3	Guatemala	2	0	2	3	7	−4	6	15	−9	341	413	−72	0	5th–7th place

Source: TS
- Canada vs. Guatemala

Canada
4
Centro Pan-Americano de Judô
13 February 2020, 09:00 UTC−3

Guatemala
1

			1	2	3
1	(Canada) (Guatemala)	Brittney Tam; Nikté Sotomayor	14; 21	21; 16	20; 22
2	(Canada) (Guatemala)	Kyleigh O'Donoghue; Diana Corleto	21; 16	21; 16
3	(Canada) (Guatemala)	Jacqueline Cheung; Alejandra Paiz	21; 8	21; 18
4	(Canada) (Guatemala)	Rachel Honderich / Kristen Tsai; Diana Corleto / Nikté Sotomayor	21; 7	21; 13
5	(Canada) (Guatemala)	Catherine Choi / Zhang Wen Yu; Alejandra Paiz / Mariana Paiz	21; 12	21; 12

- Mexico vs. Guatemala

Mexico
3
Centro Pan-Americano de Judô
13 February 2020, 15:00 UTC−3

Guatemala
2

			1	2	3
1	(Mexico) (Guatemala)	Haramara Gaitan; Nikté Sotomayor	21; 18	21; 11
2	(Mexico) (Guatemala)	Sabrina Solis; Diana Corleto	16; 21	18; 21
3	(Mexico) (Guatemala)	Jéssica Bautista; Alejandra Paiz	21; 16	22; 20
4	(Mexico) (Guatemala)	Romina Fregoso / Miriam Rodríguez; Diana Corleto / Nikté Sotomayor	13; 21	16; 21
5	(Mexico) (Guatemala)	Haramara Gaitan / Vanessa Villalobos; Alejandra Paiz / Mariana Paiz	21; 19	21; 12

- Canada vs. Mexico

Canada
5
Centro Pan-Americano de Judô
14 February 2020, 09:00 UTC−3

Mexico
0

			1	2	3
1	(Canada) (Mexico)	Brittney Tam; Haramara Gaitan	22; 20	21; 18
2	(Canada) (Mexico)	Catherine Choi; Vanessa Villalobos	21; 13	21; 11
3	(Canada) (Mexico)	Zhang Wen Yu; Jéssica Bautista	21; 14	21; 17
4	(Canada) (Mexico)	Rachel Honderich / Kristen Tsai; Romina Fregoso / Miriam Rodríguez	21; 3	21; 10
5	(Canada) (Mexico)	Jacqueline Cheung / Kyleigh O'Donoghue; Haramara Gaitan / Vanessa Villalobos	21; 13	21; 19

==== Group B ====
Pos	Team	Pld	W	L	MF	MA	MD	GF	GA	GD	PF	PA	PD	Pts	Qualification
1	United States	3	2	1	11	4	+7	25	11	+14	711	513	+198	2	Semifinals
2	Brazil	3	2	1	10	5	+5	23	12	+11	650	514	+136	2	Semifinals
3	Peru	3	2	1	9	6	+3	20	15	+5	671	538	+133	2	5th–7th place
4	Falkland Islands	3	0	3	0	15	−15	0	30	−30	163	630	−467	0	5th–7th place

Source: TS
- United States vs. Falkland Islands

United States
5
Centro Pan-Americano de Judô
13 February 2020, 09:00 UTC−3

Falkland Islands
0

			1	2	3
1	(United States) (Falkland Islands)	Natalie Chi; Soraye March	21; 2	21; 4
2	(United States) (Falkland Islands)	Esther Shi; Vicky Chater	21; 4	21; 2
3	(United States) (Falkland Islands)	Sanchita Pandey; Louise Williams	21; 3	21; 8
4	(United States) (Falkland Islands)	Chen Kuei-ya / Katherine Tor; Soraye March / Laura Minto	21; 6	21; 7
5	(United States) (Falkland Islands)	Francesca Corbett / Allison Lee; Vicky Chater / Cheryl March	21; 2	21; 6

- Peru vs. Brazil

Peru
3
Centro Pan-Americano de Judô
13 February 2020, 09:00 UTC−3

Brazil
2

			1	2	3
1	(Peru) (Brazil)	Daniela Macías; Fabiana Silva	21; 12	21; 7
2	(Peru) (Brazil)	Inés Castillo; Jaqueline Lima	15; 21	13; 21
3	(Peru) (Brazil)	Fernanda Saponara Rivva; Juliana Viana Vieira	21; 19	16; 21	22; 20
4	(Peru) (Brazil)	Daniela Macías / Dánica Nishimura; Jaqueline Lima / Sâmia Lima	16; 21	21; 15	21; 15
5	(Peru) (Brazil)	Inés Castillo / Paula la Torre Regal; Sania Lima / Tamires Santos	14; 21	17; 21

- United States vs. Brazil

United States
2
Centro Pan-Americano de Judô
13 February 2020, 15:00 UTC−3

Brazil
3

			1	2	3
1	(United States) (Brazil)	Natalie Chi; Fabiana Silva	21; 7	21; 12
2	(United States) (Brazil)	Francesca Corbett; Jaqueline Lima	19; 21	23; 21	21; 10
3	(United States) (Brazil)	Esther Shi; Sâmia Lima	16; 21	21; 17	15; 21
4	(United States) (Brazil)	Chen Kuei-ya / Sanchita Pandey; Jaqueline Lima / Sâmia Lima	21; 12	17; 21	13; 21
5	(United States) (Brazil)	Chinue de la Merced / Katherine Tor; Sania Lima / Tamires Santos	12; 21	11; 21

- Peru vs. Falkland Islands

Peru
5
Centro Pan-Americano de Judô
13 February 2020, 15:00 UTC−3

Falkland Islands
0

			1	2	3
1	(Peru) (Falkland Islands)	Inés Castillo; Louise Williams	21; 8	21; 5
2	(Peru) (Falkland Islands)	Fernanda Saponara Rivva; Soraye March	21; 8	21; 9
3	(Peru) (Falkland Islands)	Micaela Flores; Vicky Chater	21; 2	21; 3
4	(Peru) (Falkland Islands)	Paula la Torre Regal / Dánica Nishimura; Soraye March / Laura Minto	21; 3	21; 10
5	(Peru) (Falkland Islands)	Micaela Castillo / Micaela Flores; Cheryl March / Louise Williams	21; 2	21; 4

- United States vs. Peru

United States
4
Centro Pan-Americano de Judô
14 February 2020, 09:00 UTC−3

Peru
1

			1	2	3
1	(United States) (Peru)	Natalie Chi; Daniela Macías	18; 21	21; 10	21; 15
2	(United States) (Peru)	Esther Shi; Inés Castillo	22; 20	23; 21
3	(United States) (Peru)	Sanchita Pandey; Fernanda Saponara Rivva	21; 19	21; 19
4	(United States) (Peru)	Francesca Corbett / Allison Lee; Inés Castillo / Paula la Torre Regal	24; 22	16; 21	17; 21
5	(United States) (Peru)	Chen Kuei-ya / Sanchita Pandey; Daniela Macías / Dánica Nishimura	24; 26	21; 16	21; 12

- Brazil vs. Falkland Islands

Brazil
5
Centro Pan-Americano de Judô
14 February 2020, 09:00 UTC−3

Falkland Islands
0

			1	2	3
1	(Brazil) (Falkland Islands)	Jackeline Luz; Louise Williams	21; 12	21; 8
2	(Brazil) (Falkland Islands)	Jeisiane Alves; Soraye March	21; 9	21; 9
3	(Brazil) (Falkland Islands)	Juliana Viana Vieira; Laura Minto	21; 1	21; 5
4	(Brazil) (Falkland Islands)	Sania Lima / Tamires Santos; Cheryl March / Soraye March	21; 5	21; 3
5	(Brazil) (Falkland Islands)	Mariana Pedrol Freitas / Bianca Oliveira Lima; Vicky Chater / Laura Minto	21; 7	21; 6

==== Fifth to seventh place ====
5th-7th place playoff
14 February
Falkland Islands	0
Guatemala	3

5th place match
15 February
Peru	3
Guatemala	0

===== 5th-7th place playoff =====
- Falkland Islands vs. Guatemala

Falkland Islands
0
Centro Pan-Americano de Judô
14 February 2020, 16:00 UTC−3

Guatemala
3

			1	2	3
1	(Falkland Islands) (Guatemala)	Soraye March; Diana Corleto	6; 21	10; 21
2	(Falkland Islands) (Guatemala)	Louise Williams; Alejandra Paiz	11; 21	8; 21
3	(Falkland Islands) (Guatemala)	Vicky Chater; Mariana Paiz	9; 21	6; 21
4	(Falkland Islands) (Guatemala)	Soraye March / Laura Minto; Diana Corleto / Nikté Sotomayor				not played
5	(Falkland Islands) (Guatemala)	Vicky Chater / Cheryl March; Alejandra Paiz / Mariana Paiz				not played

===== Fifth place match =====
- Peru vs. Guatemala

Peru
3
Centro Pan-Americano de Judô
15 February 2020, 15:00 UTC−3

Guatemala
0

			1	2	3
1	(Peru) (Guatemala)	Daniela Macías; Nikté Sotomayor	21; 14			retired
2	(Peru) (Guatemala)	Inés Castillo; Diana Corleto	21; 12	21; 12
3	(Peru) (Guatemala)	Fernanda Saponara Rivva; Alejandra Paiz	21; 16	21; 18
4	(Peru) (Guatemala)	Daniela Macías / Dánica Nishimura; Diana Corleto / Nikté Sotomayor				not played
5	(Peru) (Guatemala)	Micaela Castillo / Micaela Flores; Alejandra Paiz / Mariana Paiz				not played

==== First to fourth place ====
Semi-finals
15 February
Canada	3
Brazil	0
15 February
Mexico	0
United States	3

Final
16 February
Canada	3
United States	0
Third place
15 February
Brazil	3
Mexico	2

===== Semifinals =====
- Canada vs. Brazil

Canada
3
Centro Pan-Americano de Judô
15 February 2020, 10:00 UTC−3

Brazil
0

			1	2	3
1	(Canada) (Brazil)	Michelle Li; Fabiana Silva	29; 27	21; 11
2	(Canada) (Brazil)	Britney Tam; Jackeline Luz	21; 7	21; 10
3	(Canada) (Brazil)	Jacqueline Cheung; Jeisiane Alves	21; 11	21; 9
4	(Canada) (Brazil)	Rachel Honderich / Kristen Tsai; Mariana Pedrol Freitas / Bianca Oliveira Lima				not played
5	(Canada) (Brazil)	Catherine Choi / Zhang Wen Yu; Jeisiane Alves / Jackeline Luz				not played

- Mexico vs. United States

Mexico
0
Centro Pan-Americano de Judô
15 February 2020, 10:00 UTC−3

United States
3

			1	2	3
1	(Mexico) (United States)	Haramara Gaitan; Natalie Chi	14; 21	21; 13	18; 21
2	(Mexico) (United States)	Sabrina Solis; Esther Shi	20; 22	15; 21
3	(Mexico) (United States)	Jéssica Bautista; Sanchita Pandey	11; 21	24; 26
4	(Mexico) (United States)	Romina Fregoso / Miriam Rodríguez; Francesca Corbett / Allison Lee				not played
5	(Mexico) (United States)	Haramara Gaitan / Vanessa Villalobos; Chen Kuei-ya / Sanchita Pandey				not played

===== Third place match =====
- Brazil vs. Mexico

Brazil
3
Centro Pan-Americano de Judô
15 February 2020, 15:00 UTC−3

Mexico
2

			1	2	3
1	(Brazil) (Mexico)	Jaqueline Lima; Haramara Gaitan	15; 21	8; 21
2	(Brazil) (Mexico)	Sâmia Lima; Sabrina Solis	21; 7	21; 9
3	(Brazil) (Mexico)	Juliana Viana Vieira; Jéssica Bautista	21; 13	21; 13
4	(Brazil) (Mexico)	Sania Lima / Tamires Santos; Haramara Gaitan / Sabrina Solis	19; 21	14; 21
5	(Brazil) (Mexico)	Jaqueline Lima / Sâmia Lima; Jéssica Bautista / Vanessa Villalobos	19; 21	21; 19	21; 14

===== Final =====
- Canada vs. United States

Canada
3
Centro Pan-Americano de Judô
16 February 2020, 10:00 UTC−3

United States
0

			1	2	3
1	(Canada) (United States)	Michelle Li; Natalie Chi	21; 12	21; 6
2	(Canada) (United States)	Catherine Choi / Zhang Wen Yu; Chen Kuei-ya / Chinue de la Merced	21; 15	21; 20
3	(Canada) (United States)	Britney Tam; Esther Shi	21; 11	21; 16
4	(Canada) (United States)	Rachel Honderich / Kristen Tsai; Francesca Corbett / Allison Lee				not played
5	(Canada) (United States)	Kyleigh O'Donoghue; Sanchita Pandey				not played
