= Badminton at the 1990 Central American and Caribbean Games =

Tournament details
- Dates: 27 November–3 December 1990
- Edition: 1
- Venue: Coyoacan Sports center
- Location: Mexico City, Mexico

Badminton competition at the 1990 Central American and Caribbean Games took place between 27 November and 3 December at the Coyoacan Sports center in Mexico City. It was the inaugural appearance for badminton at the Games.

== Medal summary ==
=== Medal table ===
* Host nation (Mexico)

Rank	Nation	Gold	Silver	Bronze	Total
1	Mexico (MEX)*	4	1	1	6
2	Jamaica (JAM)	2	3	2	7
3	Trinidad and Tobago (TRI)	0	2	2	4
4	Guatemala (GUA)	0	0	1	1
Totals (4 entries)		6	6	6	18

=== Men's events ===
Event	Gold	Silver	Bronze
Singles	Fernando de la Torre (MEX)	Ernesto de la Torre (MEX)	Robert Richards (JAM)
Doubles	Mexico (MEX); Fernando de la Torre; Ernesto de la Torre	Jamaica (JAM); Paul Leyow; George Hugh	Guatemala (GUA); Kenneth Erichsen; Renato Rosales

=== Women's events ===
Event	Gold	Silver	Bronze
Singles	Maria de la Paz Luna (MEX)	Debra O'Connor (TRI)	Marie Leyow (JAM)
Doubles	Jamaica (JAM); Marie Leyow; Terry Leyow	Trinidad and Tobago (TRI); Debra O'Connor; Virginia Chariandy	Mexico (MEX); Gabriela Melgoza; Margrita Bravo

=== Mixed events ===
Event	Gold	Silver	Bronze
Doubles	Jamaica (JAM); Robert Richards; Marie Leyow	Jamaica (JAM); George Hugh; Terry Leyow	Trinidad and Tobago (TRI); Ronald Clarke; Debra O'Connor
Team	Mexico (MEX)	Jamaica (JAM)	Trinidad and Tobago (TRI)

== Participants ==
Country	Men's	Women's	Total athletes
Aruba (ARU)	Agustin Amador Bernabela; Patrick Gregory Nelo Loefstok; Terence Sybesma; Alfred Michael Glenn Williams	Dalilah Jecqueline L. Williams M. Iraida Samara Winklaar	6
Barbados (BAR)	Alan Albert Alexander; Brian Audric Carter; Lewis Stanton Edghill; Argyle Alphonza Maynard; Paul Ian Tracy Sealy; Rodney Asquith Decarlos Selman; Chetwin Sylverster Stewart; Pedro McKelton Thomas	Gloria Charlotta Patricia Chung; Caroline Margretta Vaughn	10
Guatemala (GUA)	José Rodolfo de León Borge; Kenneth Erichsen Vargas; Raúl Antonio Martinez Morales; Renato Antonio Rosales Izaz	Irene C. Arriaza Migoya de Norlega; Ilse Mercedes Pierola Kyllmann; Maria Rosabel Vasquez Barrlos	7
Cayman Islands (CAY)	Altamont Christopher Cole; Dunstan Alexander Steve Grome	Ronette Neteria Dixon; Charlene Marie Leblanc; Emma Tompkins	5
Jamaica (JAM)	Kingsley Ford; George Hugh; Noel Gart King; Paul Anthony Leyow; Robert Richards	Marie Leyow; Terry Ann Leyow	7
Mexico (MEX)	Gerardo Cedillo Hurtado; Ernesto de la Torre Saarvedra; Fernando de la Torre Saarvedra; Juan Carlos García Tapia; Luis Lópezllera Lavalle; Enrique Parales Montoya; Lorenzo Ruiz Gutiérrez; Eugenio Tapia Jiménez	Margrita Bravo Marino; Ana Laura de la Torre Saavedra; Norma A. Hernández Elizalde; Mónica Hernández de Norla; María de la Paz Luna Féliz; Gabriela Melgoza Vega; Mónica Rojas Ambtriz	15
Suriname (SUR)	Eric Bleau; Oscar Brandon; Hedwig de la Fuente; John Sno; Clyde van Daal; Mike van Daal	Rinia Haynes; Irene Haynes; Mirellie Pawironadi; Ann Top Watkin	10
Trinidad and Tobago (TRI)	Ronald E. Clarke; David Lee Kim	Virginia Chariandy-Balwant; Debra O'Connor	4
