= Guatemala national badminton team =

National badminton team representing Guatemala

Guatemala
- Association: Federación Nacional de Bádminton de Guatemala (FEDEBADGT)
- Confederation: BPA (Pan America)
- President: Guillermo López

BWF ranking
- Current ranking: 25 ▼1 (2 January 2024)
- Highest ranking: 22 (3 January 2023)

Sudirman Cup
- Appearances: 1 (first in 1997)
- Best result: Group stage

Pan Am Mixed Team Championships
- Appearances: 9 (first in 1993)
- Best result: Runners-up (1993)

Pan Am Men's Team Championships
- Appearances: 5 (first in 2010)
- Best result: Third place (2010, 2016)

Pan Am Women's Team Championships
- Appearances: 4 (first in 2016)
- Best result: Fourth place (2016, 2018, 2022)

The Guatemala national badminton team (Spanish: Equipo nacional de bádminton de Guatemala) represents Guatemala in international badminton team competitions. The Guatemalan team is controlled by the National Badminton Federation of Guatemala (Spanish: Federation Nacional de Badminton de Guatemala). Guatemala have only participated in the Sudirman Cup once in 1997.

The men's team were runners-up in the 2012 Pan Am Badminton Championships and have been third place in 2010 and 2016. The women's team finished in third place in 2016, 2018 and 2022. The mixed team were runners-up in the 1993 Pan Am Mixed Team Championships, which qualified them for the 1997 Sudirman Cup.

Guatemala made their Olympic badminton debut in 1996. The nation made history when national player Kevin Cordón reached the semifinals of the 2020 Summer Olympics and finished in 4th place after his defeat to Anthony Sinisuka Ginting.

== Competitive record ==
=== Thomas Cup ===
Year	Round	Pos
1949	Did not enter	
1952	Did not enter	
1955	Did not enter	
1958	Did not enter	
1961	Did not enter	
1964	Did not enter	
1967	Did not enter	
1970	Did not enter	
1973	Did not enter	
1976	Did not enter	
1979	Did not enter	
1982	Did not enter	
1984	Did not enter	
1986	Did not enter	
1988	Did not qualify	
1990	Did not qualify	
1992	Did not qualify	
1994	Did not qualify	
1996	Did not qualify	
1998	Did not enter	
2000	Did not enter	
2002	Did not enter	
2004	Did not qualify	

=== Sudirman Cup ===
Year	Result
(Scotland) 1997	46th - Group 6 Relegated

== Participation in Pan American Badminton Championships ==
Men's team

Year	Result
2010	(bronze) Third place
2012	(silver) Runner-up
2016	(bronze) Third place
2020	Fourth place
2022	5th place
2024	Fourth place
2026	6th place

Women's team

Year	Result
2016	Fourth place
2018	Fourth place
2020	6th place
2022	Fourth place
2026	7th place

Mixed team

Year	Result
1993	(silver) Runner-up
2001	(bronze) Semi-finalist
2008	7th place
2012	6th place
2013	6th place
2014	5th place
2019	7th place
2023	5th place
2023	Fourth place

== Junior competitive record ==
=== Suhandinata Cup ===
==== Mixed team ====
Year	Result
(Peru) 2015	Group B1 - 24th of 39

=== Pan American Junior Team Championships ===
==== Mixed team ====
Year	Round	Pos
1977
1980
1981
1982
1984
1986
1988
1990	Champions	1st
1992	Runners-up	2nd
1994	Champions	1st
1996
1998
2000
2002
2004
2006
2007
2008
2009
2010
2011	Third place	3rd
2012
2013
2014
2015
2016	Group stage	6th
2017
2018
2019	Did not enter	
2021	Did not enter	
2022	Did not enter	
2023	Did not enter	
2024	Did not enter	
2025	Group stage	7th
2026	Did not enter	

**Red border color indicates tournament was held on home soil.

== Players ==
=== Current squad ===
As of 2 January 2024

==== Men's team ====
Name	DoB/Age	Ranking of event		
Name	DoB/Age	MS	MD	XD
Kevin Cordón	28 November 1986 (age 39)	42	707	-
Yeison del Cid	3 January 2004 (age 22)	150	200	-
Christopher Martínez	5 May 2000 (age 26)	788	200	215
Aníbal Marroquín	7 November 1992 (age 33)	-	91	-
Jonathan Solís	21 August 1993 (age 32)	-	91	111

==== Women's team ====
Name	DoB/Age	Ranking of event		
Name	DoB/Age	WS	WD	XD
Nikté Sotomayor	1 July 1994 (age 32)	101	99	-
Diana Corleto	18 December 2000 (age 25)	-	99	111
Mariana Paiz	4 July 2000 (age 26)	-	494	215
Alejandra Paiz	4 July 2000 (age 26)	335	494	940
Adriana Barrios	20 October 2005 (age 20)	323	225	973
