= 2021 BWF Continental Circuit =

Tournament details
- Dates: 12 January – 19 December
- Edition: 15th

The 2021 BWF Continental Circuit was the fifteenth season of the BWF Continental Circuit of badminton, a circuit of 40 tournaments. The 40 tournaments are divided into three levels:

- International Challenge (12 tournaments)
- International Series (16 tournaments)
- Future Series (11 tournaments).

Each of these tournaments offers different ranking points and prize money.

== Points distribution ==
Below is the point distribution table for each phase of the tournament based on the BWF points system for the BWF Continental Circuit events.

| Tournament | Winner | Runner-up | 3/4 | 5/8 | 9/16 | 17/32 | 33/64 | 65/128 | 129/256 |
|---|---|---|---|---|---|---|---|---|---|
| International Challenge | 4,000 | 3,400 | 2,800 | 2,200 | 1,520 | 920 | 360 | 170 | 70 |
| International Series | 2,500 | 2,130 | 1,750 | 1,370 | 920 | 550 | 210 | 100 | 40 |
| Future Series | 1,700 | 1,420 | 1,170 | 920 | 600 | 350 | 130 | 60 | 20 |

== Results ==
Below is the schedule released by Badminton World Federation:

=== Winners ===
==== International Challenge ====
| Tour | Men's singles | Women's singles | Men's doubles | Women's doubles | Mixed doubles |
|---|---|---|---|---|---|
| Iran Fajr International | Cancelled (Note: Tournament updates 8 December 2020, tournaments cancelled due to the COVID-19 pandemic.) | | | | —N/a |
| Canadian International | Cancelled (Note: Tournament updates 18 December 2020, tournaments cancelled due to the COVID-19 pandemic.) | | | | |
| Austrian Open | Cancelled (Note: Tournament updates 7 January 2021, tournaments cancelled due to the COVID-19 pandemic.) | | | | |
| Maldives International | Cancelled | | | | |
| Polish Open | (Malaysia) Ng Tze Yong | (Estonia) Kristin Kuuba | (Malaysia) Man Wei Chong (Malaysia) Tee Kai Wun | (Turkey) Bengisu Erçetin (Turkey) Nazlıcan İnci | (Malaysia) Choong Hon Jian (Malaysia) Toh Ee Wei |
| Osaka International | Cancelled (Note: Tournament updates 2 February 2021, tournaments cancelled due to the COVID-19 pandemic.) | | | | |
| Spanish International | (Spain) Pablo Abián | (Malaysia) Kisona Selvaduray | (Malaysia) Man Wei Chong (Malaysia) Tee Kai Wun | (Netherlands) Alyssa Tirtosentono (Netherlands) Imke van der Aar | (Malaysia) Tee Kai Wun (Malaysia) Teoh Mei Xing |
| Vietnam International | Cancelled (Note: Tournament cancelled due to the COVID-19 pandemic on 26 May 2021.) | | | | |
| White Nights | Cancelled (Note: Tournament cancelled due to the COVID-19 pandemic on 30 March 2021.) | | | | |
| Denmark Masters | (Canada) Brian Yang | (Denmark) Line Christophersen | (Denmark) Daniel Lundgaard (Denmark) Mathias Thyrri | (Denmark) Amalie Magelund (Denmark) Freja Ravn | (Denmark) Jeppe Bay (Denmark) Sara Lundgaard |
| Mexican International | (Spain) Luís Enrique Peñalver | (Spain) Beatriz Corrales | (Mexico) Job Castillo (Mexico) Luis Montoya | (Spain) Clara Azurmendi (Spain) Beatriz Corrales | (United States) Vinson Chiu (United States) Jennie Gai |
| Bendigo International | Cancelled (Note: Tournament cancelled due to the COVID-19 pandemic on 10 June 2021.) | | | | |
| Mongolia International | Cancelled | | | | |
| Dutch Open | (Singapore) Loh Kean Yew | (Estonia) Kristin Kuuba | (Singapore) Terry Hee (Singapore) Loh Kean Hean | (Sweden) Johanna Magnusson (Sweden) Clara Nistad | (Denmark) Mikkel Mikkelsen (Denmark) Rikke Søby |
| India International Challenge | (India) Priyanshu Rajawat | (India) Anupama Upadhyaya | (India) Krishna Prasad Garaga (India) Vishnu Vardhan Goud Panjala | (India) Treesa Jolly (India) Gayathri Gopichand | (India) Ishaan Bhatnagar (India) Tanisha Crasto |
| Belgian International | (Malaysia) Ng Tze Yong | (Japan) Riko Gunji | (Indonesia) Pramudya Kusumawardana (Indonesia) Yeremia Rambitan | (Japan) Rin Iwanaga (Japan) Kie Nakanishi | (Japan) Hiroki Midorikawa (Japan) Natsu Saito |
| Lagos International | Cancelled | | | | |
| Malaysia International | Cancelled | | | | |
| Irish Open | (Malaysia) Yeoh Seng Zoe | (Chinese Taipei) Hsu Wen-chi | (Malaysia) Man Wei Chong (Malaysia) Tee Kai Wun | (Netherlands) Debora Jille (Netherlands) Cheryl Seinen | (Netherlands) Robin Tabeling (Netherlands) Selena Piek |
| Bahrain International Challenge | (Indonesia) Ikhsan Rumbay | (United States) Lauren Lam | (Indonesia) Raymond Indra (Indonesia) Daniel Edgar Marvino | (Hong Kong) Yeung Nga Ting (Hong Kong) Yeung Pui Lam | (Hong Kong) Law Cheuk Him (Hong Kong) Yeung Nga Ting |
| Scottish Open | (Malaysia) Ng Tze Yong | (Chinese Taipei) Hsu Wen-chi | (Scotland) Christopher Grimley (Scotland) Matthew Grimley | (Canada) Rachel Honderich (Canada) Kristen Tsai | (England) Callum Hemming (England) Jessica Pugh |
| Welsh International | (France) Arnaud Merklé | (Chinese Taipei) Hsu Wen-chi | (South Korea) Kim Gi-jung (South Korea) Kim Sa-rang | (France) Margot Lambert (France) Anne Tran | (France) William Villeger (France) Anne Tran |
| Bangladesh International | (India) Abhishek Saini | (Indonesia) Putri Kusuma Wardani | (Sri Lanka) Sachin Dias (Sri Lanka) Buwaneka Goonethilleka | (India) Mehreen Riza (India) Arathi Sara Sunil | (Sri Lanka) Sachin Dias (Sri Lanka) Kavidi Sirimannage |
| Indonesia International | Cancelled | | | | |

==== International Series ====
| Tour | Men's singles | Women's singles | Men's doubles | Women's doubles | Mixed doubles |
|---|---|---|---|---|---|
| Estonian International | Cancelled | | | | |
| Swedish Open | Cancelled | | | | |
| Uganda International | (India) Varun Kapur | (India) Malvika Bansod | No competition | (Uganda) Husina Kobugabe (Uganda) Mable Namakoye | (Uganda) Israel Wanagalya (Uganda) Betty Apio |
| Santo Domingo Open | (Guatemala) Rubén Castellanos | (Guatemala) Nikté Sotomayor | (Guatemala) Aníbal Marroquín (Guatemala) Jonathan Solís | (Guatemala) Diana Corleto (Guatemala) Nikté Sotomayor | (Mexico) Luis Montoya (Mexico) Vanessa Villalobos |
| Dutch International | Cancelled | | | | |
| Peru International | (Canada) Brian Yang | (Hungary) Laura Sárosi | (Algeria) Koceila Mammeri (Algeria) Youcef Sabri Medel | (Guatemala) Diana Corleto (Guatemala) Nikté Sotomayor | (Guatemala) Jonathan Solís (Guatemala) Diana Corleto |
| Portugal International | (Denmark) Ditlev Jaeger Holm | (Hungary) Laura Sárosi | (Denmark) Mads Pieler Kolding (Denmark) Frederik Søgaard | (Denmark) Christine Busch (Denmark) Amalie Schulz | (England) Callum Hemming (England) Jessica Pugh |
| Slovenian International | (France) Arnaud Merklé | (Indonesia) Mutiara Ayu Puspitasari | (Indonesia) Putra Erwiansyah (Indonesia) Patra Harapan Rindorindo | (Malaysia) Low Yeen Yuan (Malaysia) Valeree Siow | (Malaysia) Choong Hon Jian (Malaysia) Toh Ee Wei |
| Austrian Open | (Indonesia) Panji Ahmad Maulana | (Spain) Clara Azurmendi | (Malaysia) Junaidi Arif (Malaysia) Muhammad Haikal | (Indonesia) Ni Ketut Mahadewi Istarani (Indonesia) Serena Kani | (Malaysia) Choong Hon Jian (Malaysia) Toh Ee Wei |
| Malaysia International | Cancelled (Note: Tournament cancelled due to the COVID-19 pandemic on 12 July 2021.) | | | | |
| Bulgarian Open | Cancelled (Note: Tournament cancelled due to the COVID-19 pandemic on 26 June 2021.) | | | | |
| Kathmandu International | Cancelled | | | | |
| Ukraine International | (India) Priyanshu Rajawat | (Ukraine) Polina Buhrova | (Malaysia) Junaidi Arif (Malaysia) Muhammad Haikal | (Germany) Stine Küspert (Germany) Emma Moszczynski | (Malaysia) Yap Roy King (Malaysia) Valeree Siow |
| Brazil International | (Brazil) Jonathan Matias | (Brazil) Juliana Viana Vieira | (Brazil) Fabrício Farias (Brazil) Francielton Farias | (Brazil) Jaqueline Lima (Brazil) Sâmia Lima | (Brazil) Fabrício Farias (Brazil) Jaqueline Lima |
| Finnish Open | Cancelled | | | | |
| Sydney International | Cancelled | | | | |
| Polish International | (India) Kiran George | (Singapore) Jaslyn Hooi | (India) Ishaan Bhatnagar (India) Sai Pratheek K. | (France) Margot Lambert (France) Anne Tran | (France) William Villeger (France) Anne Tran |
| Guatemala International | (Guatemala) Kevin Cordón | (United States) Jennie Gai | (Canada) Kevin Lee (Canada) Ty Alexander Lindeman | (United States) Francesca Corbett (United States) Allison Lee | (Canada) Ty Alexander Lindeman (Canada) Josephine Wu |
| Maldives International | Cancelled | | | | |
| Czech Open | (Czech Republic) Jan Louda | (Indonesia) Putri Kusuma Wardani | (Singapore) Terry Hee (Singapore) Loh Kean Hean | (Malaysia) Anna Cheong (Malaysia) Teoh Mei Xing | (Singapore) Terry Hee (Singapore) Tan Wei Han |
| Hungarian International | (Bulgaria) Daniel Nikolov | (Chinese Taipei) Hsu Wen-chi | (Denmark) Emil Lauritzen (Denmark) Mads Vestergaard | (Thailand) Ornnicha Jongsathapornparn (Thailand) Phataimas Muenwong | (England) Rory Easton (England) Annie Lado |
| Norwegian International | Cancelled (Note: Tournament cancelled due to the COVID-19 pandemic on 21 September 2021.) | | | | |
| Cameroon International | Cancelled (Note: Tournament cancelled due to the COVID-19 pandemic on 24 August 2021.) | | | | |
| Bahrain International Series | (Indonesia) Bobby Setiabudi | (Indonesia) Aisyah Sativa Fatetani | (Indonesia) Amri Syahnawi (Indonesia) Christopher David Wijaya | (Hong Kong) Yeung Nga Ting (Hong Kong) Yeung Pui Lam | (Hong Kong) Lee Chun Hei (Hong Kong) Ng Tsz Yau |
| Vietnam International Series | Cancelled (Note: Tournament cancelled due to the COVID-19 pandemic on 8 October 2021.) | | | | |
| Internacional Mexicano | (Ukraine) Danylo Bosniuk | (United States) Lauren Lam | (Canada) Adam Dong (Canada) Nyl Yakura | (India) Srivedya Gurazada (United States) Ishika Jaiswal | (United States) Vinson Chiu (United States) Jennie Gai |
| El Salvador International | (El Salvador) Uriel Canjura | (United States) Ishika Jaiswal | (Brazil) Jonathan Matias (Brazil) Artur Silva Pomoceno | (Brazil) Sania Lima (Brazil) Tamires Santos | (Guatemala) Christopher Martínez (Guatemala) Mariana Paiz |
| Italian International | (France) Alex Lanier | (Sweden) Edith Urell | (Denmark) Kristian Kræmer (Denmark) Marcus Rindshøj | (Germany) Stine Küspert (Germany) Emma Moszczyński | (Denmark) Jesper Toft (Denmark) Clara Graversen |

==== Future Series ====
| Tour | Men's singles | Women's singles | Men's doubles | Women's doubles | Mixed doubles |
|---|---|---|---|---|---|
| Iceland International | Cancelled | | | | |
| Slovak Open | Cancelled (Note: Tournament updates 22 January 2021, tournaments cancelled due to the COVID-19 pandemic.) | | | | |
| Kenya International | Cancelled (Note: Tournament updates 14 January 2021, tournaments cancelled due to the COVID-19 pandemic.) | | | | |
| Giraldilla International | Cancelled | | | | |
| Lithuanian International | (France) Alex Lanier | (India) Malvika Bansod | (Denmark) Emil Lauritzen (Denmark) Mads Vestergaard | (France) Téa Margueritte (France) Anna Tatranova | (Denmark) Mads Vestergaard (Denmark) Clara Løber |
| German International | Cancelled (Note: Tournament cancelled due to the COVID-19 pandemic on 2 March 2021.) | | | | |
| Benin International | (India) Farogh Sanjay Aman | (South Africa) Johanita Scholtz | (Nigeria) Gideon Babalola (Nigeria) Habeeb Temitope Bello | (South Africa) Demi Botha (South Africa) Deidre Laurens Jordaan | (South Africa) Jarred Elliott (South Africa) Deidre Laurens Jordaan |
| Latvia International | (India) Meiraba Luwang Maisnam | (Ukraine) Polina Buhrova | (Malaysia) Muhammad Nurfirdaus Azman (Malaysia) Yap Roy King | (Malaysia) Low Yeen Yuan (Malaysia) Valeree Siow | (Malaysia) Yap Roy King (Malaysia) Valeree Siow |
| Hellas International | (Malaysia) Lee Shun Yang | (England) Abigail Holden | (Malaysia) Junaidi Arif (Malaysia) Muhammad Haikal | (Malaysia) Low Yeen Yuan (Malaysia) Valeree Siow | (Malaysia) Yap Roy King (Malaysia) Valeree Siow |
| Croatian International | Cancelled | | | | |
| Maldives International | Cancelled | | | | |
| Chile Future Series | Cancelled (Note: Tournament cancelled due to the COVID-19 pandemic in Chile on 7 September 2021.) | | | | |
| Bulgarian International | (India) Meiraba Luwang Maisnam | (India) Samiya Imad Farooqui | (England) Avinash Gupta (England) Brandon Yap | (Denmark) Amalie Cecilie Kudsk (Denmark) Signe Schulz | (Denmark) Kristian Kræmer (Denmark) Amalie Cecilie Kudsk |
| Cyprus International | (Kazakhstan) Dmitriy Panarin | (Bulgaria) Hristomira Popovska | (Russia) Georgii Lebedev (Russia) Gleb Stepakov | (Italy) Katharina Fink (Italy) Yasmine Hamza | (Serbia) Mihajlo Tomić (Serbia) Anđela Vitman |
| Egypt International | Cancelled (Note: Tournament cancelled due to the COVID-19 pandemic on 9 August 2021.) | | | | |
| Algeria International | Cancelled | | | | |
| Israel Open | Cancelled | | | | |
| Dominican Open | (Brazil) Jonathan Matias | (Brazil) Juliana Viana Vieira | (Brazil) Fabricio Farias (Brazil) Francielton Farias | (Brazil) Jaqueline Lima (Brazil) Sâmia Lima | (Brazil) Fabricio Farias (Brazil) Jaqueline Lima |
| Guatemala Future Series | (Guatemala) Rubén Castellanos | (United States) Lauren Lam | (United States) Enrico Asuncion (United States) Don Henley Averia | (Guatemala) Diana Corleto (Guatemala) Nikté Sotomayor | (Guatemala) Jonathan Solís (Guatemala) Diana Corleto |
| Slovenia Future Series | (Indonesia) Andi Fadel Muhammad | (Denmark) Simona Pilgaard | (Denmark) William Kryger Boe (Denmark) Christian Faust Kjær | (Russia) Viktoriia Kozyreva (Russia) Mariia Sukhova | (Denmark) Mads Muurholm (Denmark) Clara Løber |
| Botswana International | (India) Farogh Sanjay Aman | (India) Revati Devasthale | (South Africa) Jarred Elliott (South Africa) Robert Summers | (South Africa) Amy Ackerman (South Africa) Johanita Scholtz | (Kazakhstan) Dmitriy Panarin (Kazakhstan) Kamila Smagulova |
| South Africa International | (India) Farogh Sanjay Aman | (South Africa) Johanita Scholtz | (South Africa) Jarred Elliott (South Africa) Robert Summers | (South Africa) Amy Ackerman (South Africa) Johanita Scholtz | (South Africa) Robert White (South Africa) Deidre Laurens Jordaan |

== Statistics ==
=== Performance by countries ===
Below are the 2021 BWF Continental Circuit performances by country. Only countries who have won a title are listed:

==== International Challenge ====
| Rank | Team | POL | ESP | DEN | MEX | NED | IND | BEL | IRL | BHR | SCO | WAL | BAN | Total |
|---|---|---|---|---|---|---|---|---|---|---|---|---|---|---|
| 1 | Malaysia | 3 | 3 | | | | | 1 | 2 | | 1 | | | 10 |
| 2 | India | | | | | | 5 | | | | | | 2 | 7 |
| 3 | Denmark | | | 4 | | 1 | | | | | | | | 5 |
| 4 | Indonesia | | | | | | | 1 | | 2 | | | 1 | 4 |
| 4 | Spain | | 1 | | 3 | | | | | | | | | 4 |
| 6 | France | | | | | | | | | | | 3 | | 3 |
| 6 | Japan | | | | | | | 3 | | | | | | 3 |
| 6 | Netherlands | | 1 | | | | | | 2 | | | | | 3 |
| 6 | Chinese Taipei | | | | | | | | 1 | | 1 | 1 | | 3 |
| 10 | Estonia | 1 | | | | 1 | | | | | | | | 2 |
| 10 | Canada | | | 1 | | | | | | | 1 | | | 2 |
| 10 | Hong Kong | | | | | | | | | 2 | | | | 2 |
| 10 | Singapore | | | | | 2 | | | | | | | | 2 |
| 10 | Sri Lanka | | | | | | | | | | | | 2 | 2 |
| 10 | United States | | | | 1 | | | | | 1 | | | | 2 |
| 16 | England | | | | | | | | | | 1 | | | 1 |
| 16 | Mexico | | | | 1 | | | | | | | | | 1 |
| 16 | Sweden | | | | | 1 | | | | | | | | 1 |
| 16 | Scotland | | | | | | | | | | 1 | | | 1 |
| 16 | South Korea | | | | | | | | | | | 1 | | 1 |
| 16 | Turkey | 1 | | | | | | | | | | | | 1 |

==== International Series ====
| Rank | Team | UGA | DOM | PER | POR | SVN | AUT | UKR | BRA | POL | GUA | CZE | HUN | BHR | MEX | ESA | ITA | Total |
|---|---|---|---|---|---|---|---|---|---|---|---|---|---|---|---|---|---|---|
| 1 | Guatemala | | 4 | 2 | | | | | | | 1 | | | | | 1 | | 8 |
| 1 | Indonesia | | | | | 2 | 2 | | | | | 1 | | 3 | | | | 8 |
| 3 | Brazil | | | | | | | | 5 | | | | | | | 2 | | 7 |
| 3 | Malaysia | | | | | 2 | 2 | 2 | | | | 1 | | | | | | 7 |
| 5 | Denmark | | | | 3 | | | | | | | | 1 | | | | 2 | 6 |
| 6 | India | 2 | | | | | | 1 | | 2 | | | | | 0.5 | | | 5.5 |
| 6 | United States | | | | | | | | | | 2 | | | | 2.5 | 1 | | 5.5 |
| 8 | Canada | | | 1 | | | | | | | 2 | | | | 1 | | | 4 |
| 8 | France | | | | | 1 | | | | 2 | | | | | | | 1 | 4 |
| 10 | Singapore | | | | | | | | | 1 | | 2 | | | | | | 3 |
| 11 | England | | | | 1 | | | | | | | | 1 | | | | | 2 |
| 11 | Germany | | | | | | | 1 | | | | | | | | | 1 | 2 |
| 11 | Hong Kong | | | | | | | | | | | | | 2 | | | | 2 |
| 11 | Hungary | | | 1 | 1 | | | | | | | | | | | | | 2 |
| 11 | Uganda | 2 | | | | | | | | | | | | | | | | 2 |
| 11 | Ukraine | | | | | | | 1 | | | | | | | 1 | | | 2 |
| 17 | Algeria | | | 1 | | | | | | | | | | | | | | 1 |
| 17 | Bulgaria | | | | | | | | | | | | 1 | | | | | 1 |
| 17 | Chinese Taipei | | | | | | | | | | | | 1 | | | | | 1 |
| 17 | Czech Republic | | | | | | | | | | | 1 | | | | | | 1 |
| 17 | El Salvador | | 1 | | | | | | | | | | | | | 1 | | 1 |
| 17 | Mexico | | 1 | | | | | | | | | | | | | | | 1 |
| 17 | Spain | | | | | | 1 | | | | | | | | | | | 1 |
| 17 | Sweden | | | | | | | | | | | | | | | | 1 | 1 |
| 17 | Thailand | | | | | | | | | | | | 1 | | | | | 1 |

==== Future Series ====
| Rank | Team | LTU | BEN | LAT | GRE | BUL | CYP | DOM | GUA | SVN | BOT | RSA | Total |
|---|---|---|---|---|---|---|---|---|---|---|---|---|---|
| 1 | South Africa | | 3 | | | | | | | | 2 | 4 | 9 |
| 2 | India | 1 | 1 | 1 | | 2 | | | | | 2 | 1 | 8 |
| 3 | Denmark | 2 | | | | 2 | | | | 3 | | | 7 |
| 3 | Malaysia | | | 3 | 4 | | | | | | | | 7 |
| 5 | Brazil | | | | | | | 5 | | | | | 5 |
| 6 | Guatemala | | | | | | | | 3 | | | | 3 |
| 7 | England | | | | 1 | 1 | | | | | | | 2 |
| 7 | France | 2 | | | | | | | | | | | 2 |
| 7 | Kazakhstan | | | | | | 1 | | | | 1 | | 2 |
| 7 | Russia | | | | | | 1 | | | 1 | | | 2 |
| 7 | United States | | | | | | | | 2 | | | | 2 |
| 12 | Bulgaria | | | | | | 1 | | | | | | 1 |
| 12 | Indonesia | | | | | | | | | 1 | | | 1 |
| 12 | Italy | | | | | | 1 | | | | | | 1 |
| 12 | Nigeria | | 1 | | | | | | | | | | 1 |
| 12 | Serbia | | | | | | 1 | | | | | | 1 |
| 12 | Ukraine | | | 1 | | | | | | | | | 1 |

=== Performance by categories ===
To avoid confusion and double counting, information in this table shall only be updated once a tournament has concluded. These tables were calculated after Italian International.

==== Men's singles ====
| Rank | Player | IC | IS | FS | Total |
|---|---|---|---|---|---|
| 1 | (Malaysia) Ng Tze Yong | 3 | | | 3 |
| 2 | (India) Farogh Sanjay Aman | | | 3 | 3 |
| 3 | (France) Arnaud Merklé | 1 | 1 | | 2 |
| 3 | (Canada) Brian Yang | 1 | 1 | | 2 |
| 3 | (India) Priyanshu Rajawat | 1 | 1 | | 2 |
| 6 | (Brazil) Jonathan Matias | | 1 | 1 | 2 |
| 6 | (France) Alex Lanier | | 1 | 1 | 2 |
| 6 | (Guatemala) Rubén Castellanos | | 1 | 1 | 2 |
| 9 | (India) Meiraba Luwang Maisnam | | | 2 | 2 |
| 10 | (India) Abhishek Saini | 1 | | | 1 |
| 10 | (Indonesia) Ikhsan Rumbay | 1 | | | 1 |
| 10 | (Malaysia) Yeoh Seng Zoe | 1 | | | 1 |
| 10 | (Singapore) Loh Kean Yew | 1 | | | 1 |
| 10 | (Spain) Pablo Abián | 1 | | | 1 |
| 10 | (Spain) Luís Enrique Peñalver | 1 | | | 1 |
| 16 | (Bulgaria) Daniel Nikolov | | 1 | | 1 |
| 16 | (Czech Republic) Jan Louda | | 1 | | 1 |
| 16 | (Denmark) Ditlev Jaeger Holm | | 1 | | 1 |
| 16 | (El Salvador) Uriel Canjura | | 1 | | 1 |
| 16 | (Guatemala) Kevin Cordón | | 1 | | 1 |
| 16 | (India) Kiran George | | 1 | | 1 |
| 16 | (India) Varun Kapur | | 1 | | 1 |
| 16 | (Indonesia) Panji Ahmad Maulana | | 1 | | 1 |
| 16 | (Indonesia) Bobby Setiabudi | | 1 | | 1 |
| 16 | (Ukraine) Danylo Bosniuk | | 1 | | 1 |
| 26 | (Indonesia) Andi Fadel Muhammad | | | 1 | 1 |
| 26 | (Kazakhstan) Dmitriy Panarin | | | 1 | 1 |
| 26 | (Malaysia) Lee Shun Yang | | | 1 | 1 |

==== Women's singles ====
| Rank | Player | IC | IS | FS | Total |
|---|---|---|---|---|---|
| 1 | (Chinese Taipei) Hsu Wen-chi | 3 | 1 | | 4 |
| 2 | (United States) Lauren Lam | 1 | 1 | 1 | 3 |
| 3 | (Estonia) Kristin Kuuba | 2 | | | 2 |
| 4 | (Indonesia) Putri Kusuma Wardani | 1 | 1 | | 2 |
| 5 | (Hungary) Laura Sárosi | | 2 | | 2 |
| 6 | (Brazil) Juliana Viana Vieira | | 1 | 1 | 2 |
| 6 | (India) Malvika Bansod | | 1 | 1 | 2 |
| 6 | (Ukraine) Polina Buhrova | | 1 | 1 | 2 |
| 9 | (South Africa) Johanita Scholtz | | | 2 | 2 |
| 10 | (Denmark) Line Christophersen | 1 | | | 1 |
| 10 | (India) Anupama Upadhyaya | 1 | | | 1 |
| 10 | (Japan) Riko Gunji | 1 | | | 1 |
| 10 | (Malaysia) Kisona Selvaduray | 1 | | | 1 |
| 10 | (Spain) Beatriz Corrales | 1 | | | 1 |
| 15 | (Guatemala) Nikté Sotomayor | | 1 | | 1 |
| 15 | (Indonesia) Mutiara Ayu Puspitasari | | 1 | | 1 |
| 15 | (Indonesia) Aisyah Sativa Fatetani | | 1 | | 1 |
| 15 | (Singapore) Jaslyn Hooi | | 1 | | 1 |
| 15 | (Spain) Clara Azurmendi | | 1 | | 1 |
| 15 | (Sweden) Edith Urell | | 1 | | 1 |
| 15 | (United States) Jennie Gai | | 1 | | 1 |
| 15 | (United States) Ishika Jaiswal | | 1 | | 1 |
| 23 | (Bulgaria) Hristomira Popovska | | | 1 | 1 |
| 23 | (Denmark) Simona Pilgaard | | | 1 | 1 |
| 23 | (England) Abigail Holden | | | 1 | 1 |
| 23 | (India) Samiya Imad Farooqui | | | 1 | 1 |
| 23 | (India) Revati Devasthale | | | 1 | 1 |

==== Men's doubles ====
| Rank | Players | IC | IS | FS | Total |
|---|---|---|---|---|---|
| 1 | (Malaysia) Man Wei Chong | 3 | | | 3 |
| 1 | (Malaysia) Tee Kai Wun | 3 | | | 3 |
| 3 | (Malaysia) Junaidi Arif | | 2 | 1 | 3 |
| 3 | (Malaysia) Muhammad Haikal | | 2 | 1 | 3 |
| 5 | (Singapore) Terry Hee | 1 | 1 | | 2 |
| 5 | (Singapore) Loh Kean Hean | 1 | 1 | | 2 |
| 7 | (Brazil) Fabrício Farias | | 1 | 1 | 2 |
| 7 | (Brazil) Francielton Farias | | 1 | 1 | 2 |
| 7 | (Denmark) Emil Lauritzen | | 1 | 1 | 2 |
| 7 | (Denmark) Mads Vestergaard | | 1 | 1 | 2 |
| 11 | (South Africa) Jarred Elliott | | | 2 | 2 |
| 11 | (South Africa) Robert Summers | | | 2 | 2 |
| 13 | (Denmark) Daniel Lundgaard | 1 | | | 1 |
| 13 | (Denmark) Mathias Thyrri | 1 | | | 1 |
| 13 | (India) Krishna Prasad Garaga | 1 | | | 1 |
| 13 | (India) Vishnu Vardhan Goud Panjala | 1 | | | 1 |
| 13 | (Indonesia) Pramudya Kusumawardana | 1 | | | 1 |
| 13 | (Indonesia) Yeremia Rambitan | 1 | | | 1 |
| 13 | (Indonesia) Raymond Indra | 1 | | | 1 |
| 13 | (Indonesia) Daniel Edgar Marvino | 1 | | | 1 |
| 13 | (Mexico) Job Castillo | 1 | | | 1 |
| 13 | (Mexico) Luis Montoya | 1 | | | 1 |
| 13 | (Scotland) Christopher Grimley | 1 | | | 1 |
| 13 | (Scotland) Matthew Grimley | 1 | | | 1 |
| 13 | (South Korea) Kim Gi-jung | 1 | | | 1 |
| 13 | (South Korea) Kim Sa-rang | 1 | | | 1 |
| 13 | (Sri Lanka) Sachin Dias | 1 | | | 1 |
| 13 | (Sri Lanka) Buwaneka Goonethilleka | 1 | | | 1 |
| 29 | (Algeria) Koceila Mammeri | | 1 | | 1 |
| 29 | (Algeria) Youcef Sabri Medel | | 1 | | 1 |
| 29 | (Brazil) Jonathan Matias | | 1 | | 1 |
| 29 | (Brazil) Artur Silva Pomoceno | | 1 | | 1 |
| 29 | (Canada) Kevin Lee | | 1 | | 1 |
| 29 | (Canada) Ty Alexander Lindeman | | 1 | | 1 |
| 29 | (Canada) Adam Dong | | 1 | | 1 |
| 29 | (Canada) Nyl Yakura | | 1 | | 1 |
| 29 | (Denmark) Mads Pieler Kolding | | 1 | | 1 |
| 29 | (Denmark) Frederik Søgaard | | 1 | | 1 |
| 29 | (Denmark) Kristian Kræmer | | 1 | | 1 |
| 29 | (Denmark) Marcus Rindshøj | | 1 | | 1 |
| 29 | (Guatemala) Aníbal Marroquín | | 1 | | 1 |
| 29 | (Guatemala) Jonathan Solís | | 1 | | 1 |
| 29 | (India) Ishaan Bhatnagar | | 1 | | 1 |
| 29 | (India) Sai Pratheek K. | | 1 | | 1 |
| 29 | (Indonesia) Putra Erwiansyah | | 1 | | 1 |
| 29 | (Indonesia) Patra Harapan Rindorindo | | 1 | | 1 |
| 29 | (Indonesia) Amri Syahnawi | | 1 | | 1 |
| 29 | (Indonesia) Christopher David Wijaya | | 1 | | 1 |
| 49 | (Denmark) William Kryger Boe | | | 1 | 1 |
| 49 | (Denmark) Christian Faust Kjær | | | 1 | 1 |
| 49 | (England) Avinash Gupta | | | 1 | 1 |
| 49 | (England) Brandon Yap | | | 1 | 1 |
| 49 | (Malaysia) Muhammad Nurfirdaus Azman | | | 1 | 1 |
| 49 | (Malaysia) Yap Roy King | | | 1 | 1 |
| 49 | (Nigeria) Gideon Babalola | | | 1 | 1 |
| 49 | (Nigeria) Habeeb Temitope Bello | | | 1 | 1 |
| 49 | (Russia) Georgii Lebedev | | | 1 | 1 |
| 49 | (Russia) Gleb Stepakov | | | 1 | 1 |
| 49 | (United States) Enrico Asuncion | | | 1 | 1 |
| 49 | (United States) Don Henley Averia | | | 1 | 1 |

==== Women's doubles ====
| Rank | Players | IC | IS | FS | Total |
|---|---|---|---|---|---|
| 1 | (Guatemala) Diana Corleto | | 2 | 1 | 3 |
| 1 | (Guatemala) Nikté Sotomayor | | 2 | 1 | 3 |
| 3 | (Malaysia) Low Yeen Yuan | | 1 | 2 | 3 |
| 3 | (Malaysia) Valeree Siow | | 1 | 2 | 3 |
| 5 | (France) Margot Lambert | 1 | 1 | | 2 |
| 5 | (France) Anne Tran | 1 | 1 | | 2 |
| 5 | (Hong Kong) Yeung Nga Ting | 1 | 1 | | 2 |
| 5 | (Hong Kong) Yeung Pui Lam | 1 | 1 | | 2 |
| 9 | (Germany) Stine Küspert | | 2 | | 2 |
| 9 | (Germany) Emma Moszczynski | | 2 | | 2 |
| 11 | (Brazil) Jaqueline Lima | | 1 | 1 | 2 |
| 11 | (Brazil) Sâmia Lima | | 1 | 1 | 2 |
| 13 | (South Africa) Amy Ackerman | | | 2 | 2 |
| 13 | (South Africa) Johanita Scholtz | | | 2 | 2 |
| 15 | (Canada) Rachel Honderich | 1 | | | 1 |
| 15 | (Canada) Kristen Tsai | 1 | | | 1 |
| 15 | (Denmark) Amalie Magelund | 1 | | | 1 |
| 15 | (Denmark) Freja Ravn | 1 | | | 1 |
| 15 | (India) Treesa Jolly | 1 | | | 1 |
| 15 | (India) Gayathri Gopichand | 1 | | | 1 |
| 15 | (India) Mehreen Riza | 1 | | | 1 |
| 15 | (India) Arathi Sara Sunil | 1 | | | 1 |
| 15 | (Japan) Rin Iwanaga | 1 | | | 1 |
| 15 | (Japan) Kie Nakanishi | 1 | | | 1 |
| 15 | (Netherlands) Alyssa Tirtosentono | 1 | | | 1 |
| 15 | (Netherlands) Imke van der Aar | 1 | | | 1 |
| 15 | (Netherlands) Debora Jille | 1 | | | 1 |
| 15 | (Netherlands) Cheryl Seinen | 1 | | | 1 |
| 15 | (Spain) Clara Azurmendi | 1 | | | 1 |
| 15 | (Spain) Beatriz Corrales | 1 | | | 1 |
| 15 | (Sweden) Johanna Magnusson | 1 | | | 1 |
| 15 | (Sweden) Clara Nistad | 1 | | | 1 |
| 15 | (Turkey) Bengisu Erçetin | 1 | | | 1 |
| 15 | (Turkey) Nazlıcan İnci | 1 | | | 1 |
| 35 | (Brazil) Sania Lima | | 1 | | 1 |
| 35 | (Brazil) Tamires Santos | | 1 | | 1 |
| 35 | (Denmark) Christine Busch | | 1 | | 1 |
| 35 | (Denmark) Amalie Schulz | | 1 | | 1 |
| 35 | (India) Srivedya Gurazada | | 1 | | 1 |
| 35 | (Indonesia) Ni Ketut Mahadewi Istarani | | 1 | | 1 |
| 35 | (Indonesia) Serena Kani | | 1 | | 1 |
| 35 | (Malaysia) Anna Cheong | | 1 | | 1 |
| 35 | (Malaysia) Teoh Mei Xing | | 1 | | 1 |
| 35 | (Thailand) Ornnicha Jongsathapornparn | | 1 | | 1 |
| 35 | (Thailand) Phataimas Muenwong | | 1 | | 1 |
| 35 | (Uganda) Husina Kobugabe | | 1 | | 1 |
| 35 | (Uganda) Mable Namakoye | | 1 | | 1 |
| 35 | (United States) Francesca Corbett | | 1 | | 1 |
| 35 | (United States) Allison Lee | | 1 | | 1 |
| 35 | (United States) Ishika Jaiswal | | 1 | | 1 |
| 51 | (Denmark) Amalie Cecilie Kudsk | | | 1 | 1 |
| 51 | (Denmark) Signe Schulz | | | 1 | 1 |
| 51 | (France) Téa Margueritte | | | 1 | 1 |
| 51 | (France) Anna Tatranova | | | 1 | 1 |
| 51 | (Italy) Katharina Fink | | | 1 | 1 |
| 51 | (Italy) Yasmine Hamza | | | 1 | 1 |
| 51 | (Russia) Viktoriia Kozyreva | | | 1 | 1 |
| 51 | (Russia) Mariia Sukhova | | | 1 | 1 |
| 51 | (South Africa) Demi Botha | | | 1 | 1 |
| 51 | (South Africa) Deidre Laurens Jordaan | | | 1 | 1 |

==== Mixed doubles ====
| Rank | Players | IC | IS | FS | Total |
|---|---|---|---|---|---|
| 1 | (Malaysia) Choong Hon Jian | 1 | 2 | | 3 |
| 1 | (Malaysia) Toh Ee Wei | 1 | 2 | | 3 |
| 3 | (Malaysia) Yap Roy King | | 1 | 2 | 3 |
| 3 | (Malaysia) Valeree Siow | | 1 | 2 | 3 |
| 5 | (England) Callum Hemming | 1 | 1 | | 2 |
| 5 | (England) Jessica Pugh | 1 | 1 | | 2 |
| 5 | (France) William Villeger | 1 | 1 | | 2 |
| 5 | (France) Anne Tran | 1 | 1 | | 2 |
| 5 | (United States) Vinson Chiu | 1 | 1 | | 2 |
| 5 | (United States) Jennie Gai | 1 | 1 | | 2 |
| 11 | (Brazil) Fabrício Farias | | 1 | 1 | 2 |
| 11 | (Brazil) Jaqueline Lima | | 1 | 1 | 2 |
| 11 | (Guatemala) Jonathan Solís | | 1 | 1 | 2 |
| 11 | (Guatemala) Diana Corleto | | 1 | 1 | 2 |
| 15 | (Denmark) Clara Løber | | | 2 | 2 |
| 15 | (South Africa) Deidre Laurens Jordaan | | | 2 | 2 |
| 17 | (Denmark) Jeppe Bay | 1 | | | 1 |
| 17 | (Denmark) Sara Lundgaard | 1 | | | 1 |
| 17 | (Denmark) Mikkel Mikkelsen | 1 | | | 1 |
| 17 | (Denmark) Rikke Søby | 1 | | | 1 |
| 17 | (Hong Kong) Law Cheuk Him | 1 | | | 1 |
| 17 | (Hong Kong) Yeung Nga Ting | 1 | | | 1 |
| 17 | (India) Ishaan Bhatnagar | 1 | | | 1 |
| 17 | (India) Tanisha Crasto | 1 | | | 1 |
| 17 | (Japan) Hiroki Midorikawa | 1 | | | 1 |
| 17 | (Japan) Natsu Saito | 1 | | | 1 |
| 17 | (Malaysia) Tee Kai Wun | 1 | | | 1 |
| 17 | (Malaysia) Teoh Mei Xing | 1 | | | 1 |
| 17 | (Netherlands) Robin Tabeling | 1 | | | 1 |
| 17 | (Netherlands) Selena Piek | 1 | | | 1 |
| 17 | (Sri Lanka) Sachin Dias | 1 | | | 1 |
| 17 | (Sri Lanka) Kavidi Sirimannage | 1 | | | 1 |
| 33 | (Canada) Ty Alexander Lindeman | | 1 | | 1 |
| 33 | (Canada) Josephine Wu | | 1 | | 1 |
| 33 | (Denmark) Jesper Toft | | 1 | | 1 |
| 33 | (Denmark) Clara Graversen | | 1 | | 1 |
| 33 | (England) Rory Easton | | 1 | | 1 |
| 33 | (England) Annie Lado | | 1 | | 1 |
| 33 | (Guatemala) Christopher Martínez | | 1 | | 1 |
| 33 | (Guatemala) Mariana Paiz | | 1 | | 1 |
| 33 | (Hong Kong) Lee Chun Hei | | 1 | | 1 |
| 33 | (Hong Kong) Ng Tsz Yau | | 1 | | 1 |
| 33 | (Mexico) Luis Montoya | | 1 | | 1 |
| 33 | (Mexico) Vanessa Villalobos | | 1 | | 1 |
| 33 | (Singapore) Terry Hee | | 1 | | 1 |
| 33 | (Singapore) Tan Wei Han | | 1 | | 1 |
| 33 | (Uganda) Israel Wanagalya | | 1 | | 1 |
| 33 | (Uganda) Betty Apio | | 1 | | 1 |
| 49 | (Denmark) Mads Vestergaard | | | 1 | 1 |
| 49 | (Denmark) Kristian Kræmer | | | 1 | 1 |
| 49 | (Denmark) Amalie Cecilie Kudsk | | | 1 | 1 |
| 49 | (Denmark) Mads Muurholm | | | 1 | 1 |
| 49 | (Kazakhstan) Dmitriy Panarin | | | 1 | 1 |
| 49 | (Kazakhstan) Kamila Smagulova | | | 1 | 1 |
| 49 | (Serbia) Mihajlo Tomić | | | 1 | 1 |
| 49 | (Serbia) Anđela Vitman | | | 1 | 1 |
| 49 | (South Africa) Jarred Elliott | | | 1 | 1 |
| 49 | (South Africa) Robert White | | | 1 | 1 |
