= 2026 Pan Am Badminton Championships =

Badminton tournament in Guatemala

Tournament details
- Dates: 7–10 April 2026
- Edition: 29th
- Venue: High Performance Center VIDENA
- Location: Lima, Peru

Champions
- Men's singles: (Canada) Victor Lai
- Women's singles: (Canada) Michelle Li
- Men's doubles: (United States) Chen Zhi-yi (United States) Presley Smith
- Women's doubles: (United States) Lauren Lam (United States) Allison Lee
- Mixed doubles: (United States) Presley Smith (United States) Jennie Gai

The 2026 Pan Am Badminton Championships was a continental championships tournament of badminton for the Americas. It was held in Lima, Peru from 7 to 10 April.

== Tournament ==
The 2026 Pan Am Badminton Championships is the 29th edition of the Pan American Badminton Championships. The tournament is organized by the Federación Deportiva Peruana de Bádminton with sanction from the Badminton Pan America.

=== Venue ===
This tournament is held at the High Performance Center VIDENA in Lima, Peru.

=== Point distribution ===
Below is the tables with the point distribution for each phase of the tournament based on the BWF points system for the Pan American Badminton Championships, which is equivalent to a Super 300 event.

Winner	Runner-up	3/4	5/8	9/16	17/32	33/64
7,000	5,950	4,900	3,850	2,750	1,670	660

== Medal summary ==
=== Medalists ===
Event	Gold	Silver	Bronze
Men's singles	(Canada) Victor Lai	(El Salvador) Uriel Canjura	(Canada) Joshua Nguyen
Men's singles	(Canada) Victor Lai	(El Salvador) Uriel Canjura	(Brazil) Jonathan Matias
Women's singles	(Canada) Michelle Li	(Canada) Wen Yu Zhang	(Canada) Chloe Hoang
Women's singles	(Canada) Michelle Li	(Canada) Wen Yu Zhang	(Canada) Rachel Chan
Men's doubles	(United States) Chen Zhi-yi (United States) Presley Smith	(Canada) Kevin Lee (Canada) Ty Alexander Lindeman	(Brazil) Fabrício Farias (Brazil) Davi Silva
Men's doubles	(United States) Chen Zhi-yi (United States) Presley Smith	(Canada) Kevin Lee (Canada) Ty Alexander Lindeman	(United States) Arden Quan Lee (United States) Stanley Xing
Women's doubles	(United States) Lauren Lam (United States) Allison Lee	(United States) Francesca Corbett (United States) Jennie Gai	(Brazil) Jaqueline Lima (Brazil) Sâmia Lima
Women's doubles	(United States) Lauren Lam (United States) Allison Lee	(United States) Francesca Corbett (United States) Jennie Gai	(Canada) Jackie Dent (Canada) Crystal Lai
Mixed doubles	(United States) Presley Smith (United States) Jennie Gai	(Brazil) Davi Silva (Brazil) Sânia Lima	(Brazil) Fabrício Farias (Brazil) Jaqueline Lima
Mixed doubles	(United States) Presley Smith (United States) Jennie Gai	(Brazil) Davi Silva (Brazil) Sânia Lima	(United States) Chen Zhi-yi (United States) Francesca Corbett

=== Medal table ===
* Host nation (Peru)

Rank	Nation	Gold	Silver	Bronze	Total
1	United States	3	1	2	6
2	Canada	2	2	4	8
3	Brazil	0	1	4	5
4	El Salvador	0	1	0	1
Totals (4 entries)		5	5	10	20

== Men's singles ==
=== Seeds ===
1. (Canada) Victor Lai (champion)
2. (Canada) Brian Yang (quarter-finals)
3. (Canada) Joshua Nguyen (semi-finals)
4. (Guatemala) Kevin Cordón (third round)
5. (Brazil) Jonathan Matias (semi-finals)
6. (United States) Mark Shelley Alcala (quarter-finals)
7. (United States) Garret Tan (third round)
8. (Peru) Adriano Viale (third round)

=== Finals ===
Semi-finals
1	(Canada) Victor Lai	21	21
3	(Canada) Joshua Nguyen	7	16
(El Salvador) Uriel Canjura	18	21	21
5	(Brazil) Jonathan Matias	21	12	17

Final
1	(Canada) Victor Lai	21	21
(El Salvador) Uriel Canjura	11	9

=== Top half ===
==== Section 1 ====
First round
(Guatemala) D Ochoa	21	18	21
(Peru) S Durand	14	21	13
(Mexico) J Torres	21	21
(Costa Rica) E Jiménez	11	12
(Peru) U Lescano	21	21
(Colombia) D Borja	9	15

Second round
1	(Canada) V Lai	21	21
(Paraguay) T Acha	3	6
(Brazil) D Silva	21	21
(Guatemala) D Ochoa	13	13
6	(United States) M S Alcala	21	21
(Mexico) J Torres	14	12
(El Salvador) J Alas	21	21
(Peru) U Lescano	17	15

Third round
1	(Canada) V Lai	21	21
(Brazil) D Silva	8	11
6	(United States) M S Alcala	21	21
(El Salvador) J Alas	12	11

Quarter-finals
1	(Canada) V Lai	21	21
6	(United States) M S Alcala	19	8

==== Section 2 ====
First round
(Colombia) Je Giraldo	9	17
(Guatemala) Y del Cid	21	21
(United States) E Asuncion	21	21
(Chile) B Mora	10	8
(Dominican Republic) A Taveras	17	21	21
(Barbados) K King	21	11	11
(El Salvador) M Mejia	w	/	o
(Mexico) L R Garrido

Second round
3	(Canada) J Nguyen	21	21
(Guatemala) Y del Cid	16	17
(Argentina) S Otero	21	15	21
(United States) E Asuncion	16	21	13
8	(Peru) A Viale	21	21
(Dominican Republic) A Taveras	10	13
(Brazil) D Oliveira	21	21
(El Salvador) M Mejia	9	14

Third round
3	(Canada) J Nguyen	21	21
(Argentina) S Otero	7	15
8	(Peru) A Viale	17	11
(Brazil) D Oliveira	21	21

Quarter-finals
3	(Canada) J Nguyen	21	19	23
(Brazil) D Oliveira	17	21	21

=== Bottom half ===
==== Section 3 ====
First round
(Peru) B Roque	8	10
(Argentina) N Oliva	21	21
(Paraguay) M Rotela	10	12
(Colombia) M Quirama	21	21
(Mexico) J Castillo	21	21
(Peru) G Buendia	12	13
(Canada) T Lock	21	21
(Brazil) J Mendonça	19	16

Second round
(Argentina) N Oliva	8	7
(El Salvador) U Canjura	21	21
(Colombia) M Quirama	15	15
7	(United States) G Tan	21	21
(Mexico) J Castillo	21	21
(Dominican Republic) E Zorrilla	6	8
(Canada) T Lock	13	11
4	(Guatemala) K Cordón	21	21

Third round
(El Salvador) U Canjura	21	7	21
7	(United States) G Tan	14	21	8
(Mexico) J Castillo	22	23
4	(Guatemala) K Cordón	20	21

Quarter-finals
(El Salvador) U Canjura	21	21
(Mexico) J Castillo	15	14

==== Section 4 ====
First round
(United States) A Chamakura	21	21
(Dominican Republic) V Ovalles	10	8
(Costa Rica) J Cambronero	11	19
(El Salvador) M Calzadilla	21	21
(Bolivia) G Rosales	7	14
(Colombia) N Morales	21	21

Second round
(United States) A Chamakura	21	21
(Paraguay) L Lee	7	6
(El Salvador) M Calzadilla	7	6
5	(Brazil) J Matias	21	21
(Colombia) N Morales	16	12
(Peru) F Gutiérrez	21	21
(Mexico) L Montoya	10	9
2	(Canada) B Yang	21	21

Third round
(United States) A Chamakura	17	17
5	(Brazil) J Matias	21	21
(Peru) F Gutiérrez	11	14
2	(Canada) B Yang	21	21

Quarter-finals
5	(Brazil) J Matias	21	21
2	(Canada) B Yang	19	16

== Women's singles ==
=== Seeds ===
1. (Canada) Michelle Li (champion)
2. (Canada) Wen Yu Zhang (final)
3. (Brazil) Juliana Viana Vieira (quarter-finals)
4. (Canada) Rachel Chan (semi-finals)
5. (Peru) Inés Castillo (quarter-finals)
6. (United States) Ella Lin (quarter-finals)
7. (Canada) Chloe Hoang (semi-finals)
8. (United States) Disha Gupta (quarter-finals)

=== Finals ===
Semi-finals
1	(Canada) Michelle Li	21	21
7	(Canada) Chloe Hoang	11	15
4	(Canada) Rachel Chan	15	16
2	(Canada) Wen Yu Zhang	21	21

Final
1	(Canada) Michelle Li	21	22
2	(Canada) Wen Yu Zhang	16	20

=== Top half ===
==== Section 1 ====
First round
(Dominican Republic) D Acosta	17	21	21
(Paraguay) P Rodas	21	16	6
(Peru) F Carozzi	11	6
(Mexico) S Solís	21	21

Second round
1	(Canada) M Li	21	21
(Brazil) A Ywata	10	7
(Colombia) A Higuita	15	8
(Dominican Republic) D Acosta	21	21
8	(United States) D Gupta	21	21
(El Salvador) D Hernández	6	10
(Argentina) N Sotomayor	21	21
(Mexico) S Solís	18	12

Third round
1	(Canada) M Li	21	21
(Dominican Republic) D Acosta	16	5
8	(United States) D Gupta	22	21
(Argentina) N Sotomayor	20	14

Quarter-finals
1	(Canada) M Li	21	21
8	(United States) D Gupta	15	16

==== Section 2 ====
First round
(Mexico) M Macías
(El Salvador) M Revelo	w	/	o
(Colombia) Ju Giraldo	6	14
(United States) M Cruz	21	21
(Costa Rica) V Villarreal	1	3
(Peru) N Junco	21	21

Second round
3	(Brazil) J V Vieira	21	21
(Bolivia) J Siviora	3	2
(Peru) N Miyahira	21	21
(El Salvador) M Revelo	12	19
7	(Canada) C Hoang	17	21	21
(United States) M Cruz	21	9	15
(Argentina) I Gualdi	15	11
(Peru) N Junco	21	21

Third round
3	(Brazil) J V Vieira	21	21
(Peru) N Miyahira	7	4
7	(Canada) C Hoang	21	21
(Peru) N Junco	12	9

Quarter-finals
3	(Brazil) J V Vieira	22	17	10
7	(Canada) C Hoang	20	21	21

=== Bottom half ===
==== Section 3 ====
First round
(Ecuador) M Zambrano	21	21
(Colombia) S Avila	19	13
(Barbados) S Scott	11	16
(Argentina) A Oliva	21	21
(Paraguay) S Rodas	14	17
(El Salvador) F Centeno	21	21

Second round
(Ecuador) M Zambrano	21	21
(Peru) A Munar	11	16
(Argentina) A Oliva	4	5
6	(United States) E Lin	21	21
(El Salvador) F Centeno	9	18
(Brazil) J Murosaki	21	21
(Mexico) V García	7	16
4	(Canada) R Chan	21	21

Third round
(Ecuador) M Zambrano	6	8
6	(United States) E Lin	21	21
(Brazil) J Murosaki	5	6
4	(Canada) R Chan	21	21

Quarter-finals
6	(United States) E Lin	21	17	12
4	(Canada) R Chan	13	21	21

==== Section 4 ====
First round
(United States) I Rusli	21	12	21
(Mexico) V Villalobos	10	21	12
(Peru) F Munar	21	21
(El Salvador) G Barrios	15	12

Second round
(United States) I Rusli	21	21
(Colombia) K Patiño	6	11
(Costa Rica) C Villarreal	5	4
5	(Peru) I Castillo	21	21
(Peru) F Munar	21	21
(Dominican Republic) A Acosta	11	10
(Brazil) J Alves	12	4
2	(Canada) WY Zhang	21	21

Third round
(United States) I Rusli	10	10
5	(Peru) I Castillo	21	21
(Peru) F Munar	11	15
2	(Canada) WY Zhang	21	21

Quarter-finals
5	(Peru) I Castillo	15	13
2	(Canada) WY Zhang	21	21

== Men's doubles ==
=== Seeds ===
1. (United States) Chen Zhi-yi / Presley Smith (champions)
2. (Canada) Kevin Lee / Ty Alexander Lindeman (final)
3. (Brazil) Fabrício Farias / Davi Silva (semi-finals)
4. (Brazil) Izak Batalha / Matheus Voigt (second round)

=== Finals ===
Semi-finals
1	(United States) Chen Zhi-yi (United States) Presley Smith	21	21
3	(Brazil) Fabrício Farias (Brazil) Davi Silva	12	18
(United States) Arden Quan Lee (United States) Stanley Xing	15	15
2	(Canada) Kevin Lee (Canada) Ty Alexander Lindeman	21	21

Final
1	(United States) Chen Zhi-yi (United States) Presley Smith	21	21
2	(Canada) Kevin Lee (Canada) Ty Alexander Lindeman	13	8

=== Top half ===
==== Section 1 ====
First round
(El Salvador) M Mejia (Chile) B Mora	10	22
(Barbados) K King (Barbados) S Martin	21	24

Second round
1	(United States) Chen Z-y (United States) P Smith	21	21
(Dominican Republic) Y Linarez (Dominican Republic) A Taveras	8	10
(Canada) D Leung (Canada) N Yakura	21	21
(Barbados) K King (Barbados) S Martin	12	11

Quarter-finals
1	(United States) Chen Z-y (United States) P Smith	21	21
(Canada) D Leung (Canada) N Yakura	18	13

==== Section 2 ====
First round
(Colombia) D Borja (Colombia) M Quirama	21	21
(Costa Rica) J Cambronero (Costa Rica) E Jiménez	12	12
(Mexico) J Castillo (Mexico) A Gaitan	21	21
(Guatemala) Y del Cid (Guatemala) D Ochoa	14	17

Second round
3	(Brazil) F Farias (Brazil) D Silva	21	21
(Colombia) D Borja (Colombia) M Quirama	11	10
(Peru) S Durand (Peru) D Subauste	13	17
(Mexico) J Castillo (Mexico) A Gaitan	21	21

Quarter-finals
3	(Brazil) F Farias (Brazil) D Silva	21	21
(Mexico) J Castillo (Mexico) A Gaitan	15	15

=== Bottom half ===
==== Section 3 ====
First round
(Peru) A Crisanto (Peru) B Roque	21	19	21
(Colombia) D Marulanda (Colombia) N Morales	19	21	17
(United States) A Q Lee (United States) S Xing	21	21
(Paraguay) T Acha (Paraguay) M Rotela	2	7

Second round
(Peru) A Crisanto (Peru) B Roque	17	21	21
(El Salvador) J Alas (El Salvador) M Calzadilla	21	17	19
(United States) A Q Lee (United States) S Xing	18	21	21
4	(Brazil) I Batalha (Brazil) M Voigt	21	16	14

Quarter-finals
(Peru) A Crisanto (Peru) B Roque	14	4
(United States) A Q Lee (United States) S Xing	21	21

==== Section 4 ====
First round
(Guatemala) C Martínez (Guatemala) J Solís	18	17
(Peru) J Guevara (Peru) A Viale	21	21

Second round
(Peru) J Guevara (Peru) A Viale	21	21
(Dominican Republic) V Ovalles Mordan (Dominican Republic) E Zorrilla	12	12
(Argentina) N Oliva (Argentina) S Otero	14	15
2	(Canada) Kevin Lee (Canada) T A Lindeman	21	21

Quarter-finals
(Peru) J Guevara (Peru) A Viale	11	20
(Canada) Kevin Lee (Canada) T A Lindeman	21	22

== Women's doubles ==
=== Seeds ===
1. (United States) Lauren Lam / Allison Lee (champions)
2. (United States) Francesca Corbett / Jennie Gai (final)
3. (Canada) Jackie Dent / Crystal Lai (semi-finals)
4. (Brazil) Jaqueline Lima / Sâmia Lima (semi-finals)

=== Finals ===
Semi-finals
1	(United States) Lauren Lam (United States) Allison Lee	21	21
4	(Brazil) Jaqueline Lima (Brazil) Sâmia Lima	14	9
3	(Canada) Jackie Dent (Canada) Crystal Lai	4	20
2	(United States) Francesca Corbett (United States) Jennie Gai	21	22

Final
1	(United States) Lauren Lam (United States) Allison Lee	21	21
2	(United States) Francesca Corbett (United States) Jennie Gai	18	18

=== Top half ===
==== Section 1 ====
First round
(Dominican Republic) A Acosta (Dominican Republic) D Acosta	18	17
(Mexico) V García (Mexico) V Villalobos	21	21

Second round
1	(United States) L Lam (United States) A Lee	21	21
(Colombia) S Avila (Colombia) M Restrepo	5	5
(Canada) E Zhang (Canada) W Y Zhang	21	21
(Mexico) V García (Mexico) V Villalobos	11	16

Quarter-finals
1	(United States) L Lam (United States) A Lee	21	21
(Canada) E Zhang (Canada) W Y Zhang	13	14

==== Section 2 ====
First round
(Costa Rica) C Villarreal (Costa Rica) V Villarreal	9	15
(Argentina) I Gualdi (Argentina) A Oliva	21	21

Second round
4	(Brazil) J Lima (Brazil) S Lima	21	21
(Peru) F Munar (Peru) R Munar	13	10
(El Salvador) F Centeno (El Salvador) D Hernández	21	21
(Argentina) I Gualdi (Argentina) A Oliva	9	17

Quarter-finals
4	(Brazil) J Lima (Brazil) S Lima	21	21
(El Salvador) F Centeno (El Salvador) D Hernández	8	6

=== Bottom half ===
==== Section 3 ====
First round
(Dominican Republic) C Pie (Dominican Republic) N A Jiménez	12	11
(Brazil) S Lima (Brazil) J V Vieira	21	21
(Mexico) R Fregoso (Mexico) M Rodríguez	21	21
(Peru) R Castañeda (Peru) A Yi	11	15

Second round
(Brazil) S Lima (Brazil) J V Vieira	21	21
(Paraguay) P Rodas (Paraguay) S Rodas	4	8
(Mexico) R Fregoso (Mexico) M Rodríguez	15	6
3	(Canada) J Dent (Canada) C Lai	21	21

Quarter-finals
(Brazil) S Lima (Brazil) J V Vieira	9	5
3	(Canada) J Dent (Canada) C Lai	21	21

==== Section 4 ====
First round
(Colombia) Ju Giraldo (Colombia) K Patiño	21	21
(El Salvador) G Barrios (El Salvador) M Revelo	15	16

Second round
(Colombia) Ju Giraldo (Colombia) K Patiño	11	16
(Peru) N Junco (Peru) N Miyahira	21	21
2	(Guatemala) D Corleto (Guatemala) N Sotomayor	11	7
2	' (United States) Francesca Corbett (United States) Jennie Gai	21	21

Quarter-finals
(Peru) N Junco (Peru) N Miyahira	12	7
' (United States) Francesca Corbett (United States) Jennie Gai	21	21

== Mixed doubles ==
=== Seeds ===
1. (United States) Presley Smith / Jennie Gai (champions)
2. (Canada) Jonathan Lai / Crystal Lai (quarter-finals)
3. (United States) Chen Zhi-yi / Francesca Corbett (semi-finals)
4. (Brazil) Fabrício Farias / Jaqueline Lima (semi-finals)
5. (Canada) Kevin Lee / Eliana Zhang (quarter-finals)
6. (Mexico) Luis Montoya / Miriam Rodríguez (third round)
7. (Brazil) Davi Silva / Sânia Lima (final)
8. (Guatemala) Christopher Martinez / Diana Corleto (third round)

=== Finals ===
Semi-finals
1	(United States) Presley Smith (United States) Jennie Gai	21	21
4	(Brazil) Fabrício Farias (Brazil) Jaqueline Lima	14	10
3	(United States) Chen Zhi-yi (United States) Francesca Corbett	18	19
7	(Brazil) Davi Silva (Brazil) Sânia Lima	21	21

Final
1	(United States) Presley Smith (United States) Jennie Gai	21	21
7	(Brazil) Davi Silva (Brazil) Sânia Lima	16	15

=== Top half ===
==== Section 1 ====
First round
(Bolivia) G Rosales (Bolivia) J Siviora	10	7
(Argentina) S Otero (Argentina) I Gualdi	21	21

Second round
1	(United States) P Smith (United States) J Gai	21	21
(Dominican Republic) E Zorrilla (Dominican Republic) C Pie	6	9
(Colombia) D Borja (Colombia) S Avila	21	19	25
(El Salvador) M Mejia (El Salvador) D Hernández	10	21	23
5	(Canada) K Lee (Canada) E Zhang	21	21
(Peru) M Martin (Peru) E Canchanya	5	9
(Brazil) J Mendonça (Brazil) T Santos	22	21
(Argentina) S Otero (Argentina) I Gualdi	20	14

Third round
1	(United States) P Smith (United States) J Gai	21	21
(Colombia) D Borja (Colombia) S Avila	10	5
5	(Canada) K Lee (Canada) E Zhang	21	21
(Brazil) J Mendonça (Brazil) T Santos	12	12

Quarter-finals
1	(United States) P Smith (United States) J Gai	21	22
5	(Canada) K Lee (Canada) E Zhang	19	20

==== Section 2 ====
First round
(Colombia) Je Giraldo (Colombia) Ju Giraldo	14	6
(Canada) O Chen (Canada) L Su	21	21
(Dominican Republic) A Taveras (Dominican Republic) D Acosta	18	21	21
(Peru) A Crisanto (Peru) A Yi	21	13	17

Second round
4	(Brazil) F Farias (Brazil) J Lima	21	21
(Peru) D Subauste (Peru) R Castañeda	9	10
(Costa Rica) J Cambronero (Costa Rica) V Villarreal
(Canada) O Chen (Canada) L Su	w	/	o
6	(Mexico) L Montoya (Mexico) M Rodríguez	21	21
(El Salvador) J Alas (El Salvador) M Revelo	12	8
(United States) A Liu (United States) C Lam	24	21
(Dominican Republic) A Taveras (Dominican Republic) D Acosta	22	12

Third round
4	(Brazil) F Farias (Brazil) J Lima	26	21
(Canada) O Chen (Canada) L Su	24	14
6	(Mexico) L Montoya (Mexico) M Rodríguez	17	21	14
(United States) A Liu (United States) C Lam	21	16	21

Quarter-finals
4	(Brazil) F Farias (Brazil) J Lima	21	21
(United States) A Liu (United States) C Lam	16	16

=== Bottom half ===
==== Section 3 ====
First round
(Canada) T Lock (Canada) C Hoang	21	21
(Argentina) N Oliva (Argentina) A Oliva	8	12
(Costa Rica) E Jiménez (Costa Rica) C Villarreal	2	8
(Peru) U Lescano (Peru) F Carozzi	21	21

Second round
(Canada) T Lock (Canada) C Hoang	21	21
(Brazil) D Silva (Brazil) S Lima	9	18
(Colombia) D Marulanda (Colombia) A Higuita	10	16
8	(Guatemala) C Martinez (Guatemala) D Corleto	21	21
(Peru) U Lescano (Peru) F Carozzi	21	8	14
(Mexico) A Gaitan (Mexico) R Fregoso	19	21	21
(Dominican Republic) Y Linarez (Dominican Republic) N A Jiménez	16	9
3	(United States) Chen Z-y (United States) F Corbett	21	21

Third round
(Canada) T Lock (Canada) C Hoang	21	21
8	(Guatemala) C Martinez (Guatemala) D Corleto	7	14
(Mexico) A Gaitan (Mexico) R Fregoso	10	14
3	(United States) Chen Z-y (United States) F Corbett	21	21

Quarter-finals
(Canada) T Lock (Canada) C Hoang	19	17
3	(United States) Chen Z-y (United States) F Corbett	21	21

==== Section 4 ====
First round
(Colombia) M Quirama (Colombia) M Restrepo	21	21	21
(Paraguay) T Acha (Paraguay) P Rodas	23	18	18

Second round
(Colombia) M Quirama (Colombia) M Restrepo	13	14
(Peru) J Guevara (Peru) N Miyahira	21	21
(Mexico) J Torres (Mexico) M Macías
7	(Brazil) D Silva (Brazil) S Lima	w	/	o
(Peru) S Durand (Peru) R Munar	21	21
(Barbados) S Martin (Barbados) S Scott	14	12
(El Salvador) M Calzadilla (El Salvador) G Barrios	5	11
2	(Canada) J Lai (Canada) C Lai	21	21

Third round
(Peru) J Guevara (Peru) N Miyahira	9	11
7	(Brazil) D Silva (Brazil) S Lima	21	21
(Peru) S Durand (Peru) R Munar	7	13
2	(Canada) J Lai (Canada) C Lai	21	21

Quarter-finals
7	(Brazil) D Silva (Brazil) S Lima	21	21
2	(Canada) J Lai (Canada) C Lai	18	12
