= Badminton at the 2023 Pan American Games =

- Badminton pictogram
- Venue: Olympic Training Center
- Start date: October 21, 2023
- End date: October 25, 2023
- No. of events: 5 (2 men, 2 women, 1 mixed)
- Competitors: 90 from 23 nations

Badminton competitions at the 2023 Pan American Games in Santiago, Chile were held between October 21 and 25, 2023 at the Olympic Training Center, located in Ñuñoa, a suburb of Santiago.

Five medal events were contested: singles and doubles for men and women and a mixed doubles event. A total of 90 athletes competed.

The event awarded ranking points towards selection for the 2024 Summer Olympics in Paris, France.

== Qualification ==
A total of 90 athletes (45 men and 45 women) will qualify to compete at the games. A nation may enter a maximum of four athletes per gender. As host nation, Chile automatically qualified a full team of eights athletes. All other quotas will be awarded through the team world rankings as of May 2, 2023. Each nation's highest ranked athlete/pair's points in each of the five events will be added to determine a country's point total. The top three ranked will qualify eight athletes, the next four countries will qualify six each (three per gender) and the next four after that will qualify four each (two per gender). All other nations will qualify one athlete each, until the quota per gender is reached. The gold medalists in both Men’s Singles and the Women’s Singles in the 2021 Junior Pan American Games received a direct quota for the Santiago 2023 Pan American Games, which will not be part of the maximum quota specified within the qualification process for these Games.

== Participating nations ==
A total of 23 NOC's qualified athletes. The number of athletes a nation entered is in parentheses beside the name of the country.

- Argentina (4)
- Barbados (1)
- Bolivia (1)
- Brazil (8)
- Canada (10)
- Chile (8)
- Colombia (2)
- Costa Rica (1)
- Cuba (4)
- Dominican Republic (4)
- Ecuador (2)
- El Salvador (6)
- Guyana (1)
- Haiti (1)
- Independent Athletes Team (7)
- Jamaica (4)
- Mexico (6)
- Paraguay (1)
- Peru (6)
- Suriname (1)
- Trinidad and Tobago (2)
- United States (8)
- Venezuela (2)

== Medal summary ==
=== Medal table ===
* Host nation (Chile)

Rank	NOC	Gold	Silver	Bronze	Total
1	Canada	4	0	1	5
2	United States	1	3	0	4
3	Brazil	0	1	2	3
4	Independent Athletes Team	0	1	1	2
5	Mexico	0	0	3	3
6	Cuba	0	0	1	1
6	El Salvador	0	0	1	1
6	Peru	0	0	1	1
Totals (8 entries)		5	5	10	20

=== Medalists ===
Event	Gold	Silver	Bronze
Men's singles	Brian Yang; Canada	Kevin Cordón; Independent Athletes Team	Uriel Canjura; El Salvador
Men's singles	Brian Yang; Canada	Kevin Cordón; Independent Athletes Team	Luis Ramón Garrido; Mexico
Women's singles	Beiwen Zhang; United States	Jennie Gai; United States	Rachel Chan; Canada
Women's singles	Beiwen Zhang; United States	Jennie Gai; United States	Taymara Oropesa; Cuba
Men's doubles	Canada; Adam Dong; Nyl Yakura	Brazil; Fabrício Farias; Davi Silva	Independent Athletes Team; Aníbal Marroquín; Jonathan Solís
Men's doubles	Canada; Adam Dong; Nyl Yakura	Brazil; Fabrício Farias; Davi Silva	Mexico; Job Castillo; Luis Montoya
Women's doubles	Canada; Catherine Choi; Josephine Wu	United States; Annie Xu; Kerry Xu	Mexico; Romina Fregoso; Miriam Rodríguez
Women's doubles	Canada; Catherine Choi; Josephine Wu	United States; Annie Xu; Kerry Xu	Brazil; Sânia Lima; Juliana Vieira
Mixed doubles	Canada; Ty Alexander Lindeman; Josephine Wu	United States; Vinson Chiu; Jennie Gai	Brazil; Davi Silva; Sânia Lima
Mixed doubles	Canada; Ty Alexander Lindeman; Josephine Wu	United States; Vinson Chiu; Jennie Gai	Peru; José Guevara; Inés Castillo

== See also ==
- Badminton at the 2023 Parapan American Games
- Badminton at the 2024 Summer Olympics
