= Badminton at the 2026 Central American and Caribbean Games =

- Venue: Pabellón de Tenis de Mesa
- Location: Santo Domingo Este, Dominican Republic
- Dates: 23–28 July

The badminton competition at the 2026 Central American and Caribbean Games was held in Santo Domingo Este, Dominican Republic, from 23 to 28 July 2026 at the Pabellón de Tenis de Mesa.

== Medal table ==
* Host nation (Dominican Republic)

Rank	Nation	Gold	Silver	Bronze	Total
1	Mexico (MEX)	3	3	3	9
2	Guatemala (GUA)	2	2	3	7
3	Cuba (CUB)	1	1	1	3
4	Dominican Republic (DOM)*	0	0	2	2
5	El Salvador (ESA)	0	0	1	1
5	Jamaica (JAM)	0	0	1	1
Totals (6 entries)		6	6	11	23

== Medal summary ==
Event	Gold	Silver	Bronze
Men's singles	Kevin Cordón; Guatemala	Luis Montoya; Mexico	Job Castillo; Mexico
Men's singles	Kevin Cordón; Guatemala	Luis Montoya; Mexico	Yeison del Cid; Guatemala
Women's singles	Taymara Oropesa; Cuba	Vanessa García; Mexico	Tahlia Richardson; Jamaica
Women's singles	Taymara Oropesa; Cuba	Vanessa García; Mexico	Nikté Sotomayor; Guatemala
Men's doubles	Guatemala; Christopher Martínez; Jonathan Solís	Mexico; Job Castillo; Armando Gaitán	Mexico; Luis Montoya; Juan Torres
Men's doubles	Guatemala; Christopher Martínez; Jonathan Solís	Mexico; Job Castillo; Armando Gaitán	Dominican Republic; Anderson Taveras; Yonatan Linarez
Women's doubles	Mexico; Romina Fregoso; Miriam Rodríguez	Cuba; Erly Cabrera; Taymara Oropesa	Mexico; Vanessa García; Vanessa Villalobos
Women's doubles	Mexico; Romina Fregoso; Miriam Rodríguez	Cuba; Erly Cabrera; Taymara Oropesa	Guatemala; Diana Corleto; Nikté Sotomayor
Mixed doubles	Mexico; Luis Montoya; Miriam Rodríguez	Guatemala; Christopher Martínez; Diana Corleto	Cuba; Roberto Herrera; Taymara Oropesa
Mixed doubles	Mexico; Luis Montoya; Miriam Rodríguez	Guatemala; Christopher Martínez; Diana Corleto	Dominican Republic; Yonatan Linarez; Nairoby Jiménez
Mixed team	Mexico; Job Castillo; Armando Gaitán; Luis Montoya; Juan Torres; Romina Fregoso; Vanessa García; Miriam Rodríguez; Vanessa Villalobos	Guatemala; Kevin Cordón; Yeison del Cid; Christopher Martínez; Jonathan Solís; Diana Corleto; Fátima Gutiérrez; Eneida Santizo; Nikté Sotomayor	El Salvador; Javier Alas; Melvin Calzadilla; Uriel Canjura; Manuel Mejía; Gabriela Barrios; Fátima Centeno; Daniela Hernández; Margareth Revelo
