= Badminton at the 2023 Pan American Games – Men's doubles =

Badminton – Men's doubles at the 2023 Pan American Games
- Venue: Olympic Training Center
- Start date: October 22, 2023
- End date: October 25, 2023
- Competitors: 28 from 12 nations

Medalists
Gold medal	Adam Dong; Nyl Yakura	Canada
Silver medal	Fabrício Farias; Davi Silva	Brazil
Bronze medal	Aníbal Marroquín; Jonathan Solís	Independent Athletes Team
Bronze medal	Job Castillo; Luis Montoya	Mexico

The men's doubles badminton event at the 2023 Pan American Games was held from October 22 to 25 at the Olympic Training Center, located in Ñuñoa, a suburb of Santiago. The defending Pan American Games champion are Jason Ho-Shue and Nyl Yakura of Canada. Ho-Shue has since retired and Yakura will be competing with a different partner Adam Dong.

Each National Olympic Committee could enter a maximum of two pairs into the competition. The athletes will be drawn into an elimination stage draw. Once a pair lost a match, they will be no longer able to compete. Each match will be contested as the best of three games. A total of 28 athletes from 12 NOC's competed.

== Qualification ==
A total of 90 athletes (45 men and 45 women) qualified to compete at the games. A nation may enter a maximum of four athletes per gender (five if qualified through the 2021 Junior Pan American Games. As host nation, Chile automatically qualified a full team of eights athletes. All other quotas will be awarded through the team world rankings as of May 2, 2023. Each nation's highest ranked athlete/pair's points in each of the five events will be added to determine a country's point total.

== Seeds ==
The following pairs were seeded:

1. Kevin Lee / Ty Alexander Lindeman (CAN) (quarter-finals)
2. Nyl Yakura / Adam Dong (CAN) (champions, gold medalists)

== Results ==
=== Bracket ===
First Round
Fernando Sanhueza (CHI); Sebastián Vásquez (CHI)	7	5
Aníbal Marroquín (EAI); Jonathan Solís (EAI)	21	21
Davi Silva (BRA); Fabrício Farias (BRA)	21	21
Bradley Evans (JAM); Samuel Ricketts (JAM)	11	12
Manuel Mejía (ESA); Javier Alas (ESA)	6	10
Joshua Yuan (USA); Vinson Chiu (USA)	21	21
Job Castillo (MEX); Luis Montoya (MEX)	21	21
Diego Mini (PER); José Guevara (PER)	16	11
Ángel Mariñez (DOM); Yonatan Linarez (DOM)	21	16	19
Juan Bencomo (CUB); Roberto Herrera (CUB)	18	21	21
Benjamín Bahamondez (CHI); Alonso Medel (CHI)	13	10
Nicolás Oliva (ARG); Santiago Otero (ARG)	21	21

Quarter-finals
1	Kevin Lee (CAN); Ty Alexander Lindeman (CAN)	21	10	18
Aníbal Marroquín (EAI); Jonathan Solís (EAI)	15	21	21
Davi Silva (BRA); Fabrício Farias (BRA)	21	15	21
Joshua Yuan (USA); Vinson Chiu (USA)	19	21	18
Job Castillo (MEX); Luis Montoya (MEX)	21	21
Juan Bencomo (CUB); Roberto Herrera (CUB)	9	13
Nicolás Oliva (ARG); Santiago Otero (ARG)	13	12
2	Nyl Yakura (CAN); Adam Dong (CAN)	21	21

Semi-finals
Aníbal Marroquín (EAI); Jonathan Solís (EAI)	18	16
Davi Silva (BRA); Fabrício Farias (BRA)	21	21
Job Castillo (MEX); Luis Montoya (MEX)	10	23	23
2	Nyl Yakura (CAN); Adam Dong (CAN)	21	21	25

Final
Davi Silva (BRA); Fabrício Farias (BRA)	21	15	18
2	Nyl Yakura (CAN); Adam Dong (CAN)	19	21	21
