= Badminton at the 2023 Central American and Caribbean Games =

- Venue: Coliseo Complejo El Polvorín
- Location: San Salvador
- Dates: 25 – 30 July
- Competitors: 60 from 12 nations

The badminton competition at the 2023 Central American and Caribbean Games will be held in San Salvador, El Salvador from 25 to 30 July at the Coliseo Complejo El Polvorín. It was the seventh appearance for badminton at the Games.

== Participating nations ==
A total of 12 countries qualified athletes. The number of athletes a nation entered is in parentheses beside the name of the country.

- Barbados (5)
- Colombia (4)
- Costa Rica (4)
- Cuba (2)
- Dominican Republic (7)
- El Salvador (8)
- Centro Caribe Sports (8)
- Guyana (5)
- Jamaica (4)
- Mexico (8)
- Trinidad and Tobago (2)
- Venezuela (5)

== Medal summary ==
=== Men's events ===
Event	Gold	Silver	Bronze
Singles	Luis Ramón Garrido (MEX)	Yeison del Cid (CCS)	Samuel Ricketts (JAM) Armando Gaitán (MEX)
Doubles	Centro Caribe Sports (CCS); Aníbal Marroquín; Jonathan Solís	Mexico (MEX); Job Castillo; Luis Montoya	Dominican Republic (DOM); Yonatan Linarez; Miguel Marinez Centro Caribe Sports (CCS); Yeison del Cid; Christopher Martínez

=== Women's events ===
Event	Gold	Silver	Bronze
Singles	Haramara Gaitán (MEX)	Taymara Oropesa (CUB)	Nikté Sotomayor (CCS) Tahlia Richardson (JAM)
Doubles	Mexico (MEX); Miriam Rodríguez; Romina Fregoso	Centro Caribe Sports (CCS); Diana Corleto; Nikté Sotomayor	Dominican Republic (DOM); Alissa Acosta; Nairoby Jiménez Jamaica (JAM); Katherine Wynter; Tahlia Richardson

=== Mixed events ===
Event	Gold	Silver	Bronze
Doubles	Mexico (MEX); Luis Montoya; Miriam Rodríguez	Centro Caribe Sports (CCS); Christopher Martínez; Mariana Paiz	Jamaica (JAM); Samuel Ricketts; Tahlia Richardson Centro Caribe Sports (CCS); Jonathan Solís; Diana Corleto
Team	Mexico (MEX); Luis Ramón Garrido; Job Castillo; Luis Montoya; Armando Gaitán; Haramara Gaitán; Sabrina Solis; Miriam Rodríguez; Romina Fregoso	Centro Caribe Sports (CCS); Christopher Martínez; Diana Corleto; Mariana Paiz; Eneida Santizo; Nikté Sotomayor; Aníbal Marroquín; Jonathan Solís; Yeison del Cid	Jamaica (JAM); Katherine Wynter; Zane Reid; Tahlia Richardson; Samuel Ricketts

== Medal table ==
Rank	Nation	Gold	Silver	Bronze	Total
1	Mexico (MEX)	5	1	1	7
2	Centro Caribe Sports (CCS)	1	4	3	8
3	Cuba (CUB)	0	1	0	1
4	Jamaica (JAM)	0	0	5	5
5	Dominican Republic (DOM)	0	0	2	2
Totals (5 entries)		6	6	11	23
