= Adam Dong =

Canadian badminton player (born 1994)

Adam Dong 董星宇
Personal information
- Born: Dong Xingyu; 14 February 1994 (age 32) Suzhou, Jiangsu, China
- Years active: 2006–present
- Height: 1.78 m (5 ft 10 in)

Sport
- Country: China (2006–2015); Canada (2016–present)
- Sport: Badminton
- Handedness: Left

Men's doubles
- Highest ranking: 30 (MD with Nyl Yakura, 17 September 2024)
- Current ranking: 30 (MD with Nyl Yakura, 17 September 2024)
- BWF profile
Medal record
Men's badminton
Representing Canada
Pan American Games
Gold medal – first place	2023 Santiago	Men's doubles
Pan Am Championships
Gold medal – first place	2023 Kingston	Men's doubles
Silver medal – second place	2024 Guatemala City	Men's doubles
Bronze medal – third place	2022 San Salvador	Men's doubles
Pan Am Male Cup
Gold medal – first place	2024 São Paulo	Men's team
Pan Am Mixed Team Championships
Gold medal – first place	2023 Guadalajara	Mixed team

Adam Dong (Chinese: 董星宇; pinyin: Dǒng Xīngyǔ; born 14 February 1994) is a Chinese-born Canadian badminton player. He captured the men's doubles gold medals at the 2023 Pan American Games and at the 2023 Pan Am Championships.

== Early life ==
Dong was born in Suzhou, China. Before moving to Canada, he competed in the 2011 National Intercity Games of the People's Republic of China and won a gold in the badminton men's team event representing Nanjing.

== Career ==
Dong entered the Canadian national team in 2016. On that same year, he partnered with Nyl Yakura. After the duo split up, he formed partnerships with Guoxing Huang and David Wu.

He later partnered with Yakura again in 2021 and they won their first international title together at the Mexican International Series. In 2022, Dong and Yakura won bronze at the 2022 Pan Am Championships. Dong also represented Canada at the 2022 Thomas & Uber Cup. Dong was also selected to be part of the Canadian contingent competing in the 2022 Commonwealth Games. Dong and Yakura were also runners-up at the Sydney International in October.

In 2023, Dong won the gold medal at the Pan Am Championships partnering Yakura. He made his debut at the Pan American Games, and together with Yakura, he captured the gold medal in the men's doubles.

== Achievements ==
=== Pan American Games ===
Men's doubles
Year	Venue	Partner	Opponent	Score	Result
2023	Olympic Training Center; Santiago, Chile	(Canada) Nyl Yakura	(Brazil) Fabrício Farias (Brazil) Davi Silva	19–21, 21–15, 21–18	Gold

=== Pan Am Championships ===
Men's doubles
Year	Venue	Partner	Opponent	Score	Result
2022	Palacio de los Deportes Carlos "El Famoso" Hernández; San Salvador, El Salvador	(Canada) Nyl Yakura	(Mexico) Job Castillo (Mexico) Luis Montoya	21–17, 19–21, 13–21	Bronze
2023	G.C. Foster College of Physical Education and Sport; Kingston, Jamaica	(Canada) Nyl Yakura	(Canada) Kevin Lee (Canada) Ty Alexander Lindeman	21–10, 16–21, 22–20	Gold
2024	Teodoro Palacios Flores Gymnasium; Guatemala City, Guatemala	(Canada) Nyl Yakura	(United States) Chen Zhi-yi (United States) Presley Smith	14–21, 11–21	Silver

=== BWF International Challenge/Series (1 title, 4 runners-up) ===
Men's doubles
Year	Tournament	Partner	Opponent	Score	Result
2021	Internacional Mexicano	(Canada) Nyl Yakura	(Italy) Fabio Caponio (Italy) Giovanni Toti	21–10, 21–10	(gold) Winner
2022	Sydney International	(Canada) Nyl Yakura	(Chinese Taipei) Lee Fang-chih (Chinese Taipei) Lee Fang-jen	12–21, 21–16, 16–21	(silver) Runner-up
2022	Peru Challenge	(Canada) Nyl Yakura	(Canada) Jason Ho-Shue (Canada) Joshua Hurlburt-Yu	15–21, 21–18, 12–21	(silver) Runner-up
2023	Peru Challenge	(Canada) Nyl Yakura	(Canada) Kevin Lee (Canada) Ty Alexander Lindeman	16–21, 18–21	(silver) Runner-up
2023	Canadian International	(Canada) Nyl Yakura	(Malaysia) Mohamad Arif Abdul Latif (Canada) Jonathan Lai	21–13, 17–21, 15–21	(silver) Runner-up

BWF International Challenge tournament
BWF International Series tournament
BWF Future Series tournament
