= Luis Montoya (badminton) =

Mexican badminton player (born 2000)

Personal information
- Born: Luis Armando Montoya Navarro; 8 December 2000 (age 25) Guadalajara, Jalisco, Mexico
- Height: 1.85 m (6 ft 1 in)
- Weight: 82 kg (181 lb)

Sport
- Country: Mexico
- Sport: Badminton
- Handedness: Right

Men's singles & doubles
- Highest ranking: 100 (MS 19 October 2021); 48 (MD with Job Castillo 26 August 2024); 53 (XD with Miriam Rodríguez 30 January 2024)
- Current ranking: 248 (MS), 813 (MD with Job Castillo), 113 (XD with Miriam Rodríguez) (3 August 2026)
- BWF profile
Medal record
Men's badminton
Representing Mexico
Pan American Games
Bronze medal – third place	2023 Santiago	Men's doubles
Pan Am Championships
Gold medal – first place	2022 San Salvador	Men's doubles
Bronze medal – third place	2019 Aguascalientes	Men's doubles
Bronze medal – third place	2021 Guatemala City	Men's doubles
Bronze medal – third place	2024 Guatemala City	Men's doubles
Pan Am Male Cup
Silver medal – second place	2020 Salvador	Men's team
Bronze medal – third place	2022 Acapulco	Men's team
Bronze medal – third place	2024 São Paulo	Men's team
Central American and Caribbean Games
Gold medal – first place	2018 Barranquilla	Mixed team
Gold medal – first place	2023 San Salvador	Mixed team
Gold medal – first place	2023 San Salvador	Mixed doubles
Gold medal – first place	2026 Santo Domingo	Mixed team
Gold medal – first place	2026 Santo Domingo	Mixed doubles
Silver medal – second place	2023 San Salvador	Men's doubles
Silver medal – second place	2026 Santo Domingo	Men's singles
Bronze medal – third place	2026 Santo Domingo	Men's doubles
Junior Pan American Games
Bronze medal – third place	2021 Cali–Valle	Boys' singles

Luis Armando Montoya Navarro (born 8 December 2000) is a Mexican badminton player. Partnering Job Castillo, he won the gold medal at the 2022 Pan Am Championships, and the bronze medal at the 2023 Pan American Games. He was part of the Mexican team that won the gold medals at the 2018, 2023 and 2026 Central American and Caribbean Games.

== Achievements ==
=== Pan American Games ===
Men's doubles
Year	Venue	Partner	Opponent	Score	Result	Ref.
2023	Olympic Training Center; Santiago, Chile	(Mexico) Job Castillo	(Canada) Adam Dong (Canada) Nyl Yakura	10–21, 23–21, 23–25	Bronze	

=== Pan Am Championships ===
Men's doubles
Year	Venue	Partner	Opponent	Score	Result	Ref.
2019	Gimnasio Olímpico; Aguascalientes, Mexico	(Mexico) Andrés López	(Cuba) Osleni Guerrero (Cuba) Leodannis Martínez	23–25, 19–21	Bronze	
2021	Sagrado Corazon de Jesus; Guatemala City, Guatemala	(Mexico) Job Castillo	(United States) Phillip Chew (United States) Ryan Chew	17–21, 21–14, 23–25	Bronze	
2022	Palacio de los Deportes Carlos "El Famoso" Hernández; San Salvador, El Salvador	(Mexico) Job Castillo	(United States) Vinson Chiu (United States) Joshua Yuan	22–20, 11–8 retired	Gold	
2024	Teodoro Palacios Flores Gymnasium; Guatemala City, Guatemala	(Mexico) Job Castillo	(United States) Chen Zhi-yi (United States) Presley Smith	21–15, 13–21, 10–21	Bronze	

=== Central American and Caribbean Games ===
Men's singles
Year	Venue	Opponent	Score	Result	Ref.
2026	Pabellón de Tenis de Mesa; Santo Domingo Este, Dominican Republic	(Guatemala) Kevin Cordón	19–21, 21–10, 21–17	Silver	

Men's doubles
Year	Venue	Partner	Opponent	Score	Result	Ref.
2023	Coliseo Complejo El Polvorín; San Salvador, El Salvador	(Mexico) Job Castillo	Aníbal Marroquín; Jonathan Solís	21–16, 14–21, 20–22	Silver	
2026	Pabellón de Tenis de Mesa; Santo Domingo Este, Dominican Republic	(Mexico) Juan Torres	(Guatemala) Christopher Martínez (Guatemala) Jonathan Solís	21–16, 19–21, 15–21	Bronze	

Mixed doubles
Year	Venue	Partner	Opponent	Score	Result	Ref.
2023	Coliseo Complejo El Polvorín; San Salvador, El Salvador	(Mexico) Miriam Rodríguez	Christopher Martínez; Mariana Paiz	21–5, 21–15	Gold	
2026	Pabellón de Tenis de Mesa; Santo Domingo Este, Dominican Republic	(Mexico) Miriam Rodríguez	(Guatemala) Christopher Martínez (Guatemala) Diana Corleto	12–21, 21–13, 21–15	Gold	

=== Junior Pan American Games ===
Boys' singles
Year	Venue	Opponent	Score	Result	Ref.
2021	Pacific Valley Events Center; Yumbo, Valle, Colombia	(El Salvador) Uriel Canjura	21–19, 8–21, 17–21	Bronze	

=== BWF International Challenge/Series (18 titles, 15 runners-up) ===
Men's singles
Year	Tournament	Opponent	Score	Result	Ref.
2021	Santo Domingo Open	(Guatemala) Rubén Castellanos	21–19, 19–21, 13–21	(silver) Runner-up	
2021	Mexican International	(Spain) Luis Enrique Peñalver	10–21, 12–21	(silver) Runner-up	
2022	Mexico Future Series	(Mexico) Job Castillo	21–16, 10–21, 22–20	(gold) Winner	
2024	Mexico Future Series	(Canada) Joshua Nguyen	12–21, 15–21	(silver) Runner-up	
2024	Mexican International	(United States) Mark Alcala	15–21, 21–18, 12–21	(silver) Runner-up	

Men's doubles
Year	Tournament	Partner	Opponent	Score	Result	Ref.
2016	Internacional Mexicano	(Mexico) Jesús Barajas	(Mexico) Mauricio Casillas (Mexico) Arturo Hernández	21–18, 17–21, 22–20	(gold) Winner	
2018	Internacional Mexicano	(Mexico) Andrés López	(Brazil) Fabrício Farias (Brazil) Francielton Farias	21–15, 24–22	(gold) Winner	
2018	Dominican Open	(Mexico) Job Castillo	(Dominican Republic) William Cabrera (Dominican Republic) Nelson Javier	21–18, 21–18	(gold) Winner	
2019	Mexico Future Series	(Mexico) Andrés López	(Cuba) Osleni Guerrero (Cuba) Leodannis Martínez	13–21, 19–21	(silver) Runner-up	
2019	Guatemala International	(Mexico) Job Castillo	(Brazil) Fabrício Farias (Brazil) Francielton Farias	17–21, 10–21	(silver) Runner-up	
2021	Mexican International	(Mexico) Job Castillo	(United States) Enrico Asuncion (United States) Vinson Chiu	21–16, 21–14	(gold) Winner	
2022	Mexico Future Series	(Mexico) Job Castillo	(England) Kern Pong Lap Kan (England) Larry Pong	23–21, 22–24, 20–22	(silver) Runner-up	
2023	Santo Domingo Open	(Mexico) Job Castillo	(Brazil) Fabrício Farias (Brazil) Davi Silva	23–21, 15–21, 21–19	(gold) Winner	
2023	Venezuela International	(Mexico) Job Castillo	(Dominican Republic) Yonatan Linarez (Dominican Republic) Angel Marinez	21–11, 21–12	(gold) Winner	
2023	Guatemala International	(Mexico) Job Castillo	(Algeria) Koceila Mammeri (Algeria) Youcef Sabri Medel	21–18, 21–17	(gold) Winner	
2023	Mexican International	(Mexico) Job Castillo	(United States) Zicheng Xu (United States) Tianqi Zhang	Walkover	(silver) Runner-up	
2024	Iran Fajr International	(Mexico) Job Castillo	(India) Krishna Prasad Garaga (India) Sai Pratheek K.	18–21, 19–21	(silver) Runner-up	

Mixed doubles
Year	Tournament	Partner	Opponent	Score	Result	Ref.
2019	Mexico Future Series	(Mexico) Vanessa Villalobos	(Cuba) Osleni Guerrero (Cuba) Tahimara Oropeza	20–22, 21–15, 16–21	(silver) Runner-up	
2019	Internacional Mexicano	(Mexico) Vanessa Villalobos	(Brazil) Fabrício Farias (Brazil) Jaqueline Lima	21–19, 21–19	(gold) Winner	
2021	Santo Domingo Open	(Mexico) Vanessa Villalobos	(Guatemala) Jonathan Solís (Guatemala) Diana Corleto	21–17, 21–17	(gold) Winner	
2021	Peru International	(Mexico) Vanessa Villalobos	(Guatemala) Jonathan Solís (Guatemala) Diana Corleto	12–21, 7–21	(silver) Runner-up	
2021	Mexican International	(Mexico) Vanessa Villalobos	(United States) Vinson Chiu (United States) Jennie Gai	17–21, 18–21	(silver) Runner-up	
2023	Santo Domingo Open	(Mexico) Miriam Rodríguez	(Algeria) Koceila Mammeri (Algeria) Tanina Mammeri	13–21, 19–21	(silver) Runner-up	
2023	Mexico Future Series	(Mexico) Miriam Rodríguez	(Canada) Daniel Zhou (Canada) Chloe Hoang	21–13, 23–25, 21–14	(gold) Winner	
2023	Venezuela International	(Mexico) Miriam Rodríguez	(Mexico) Job Castillo (Mexico) Romina Fregoso	21–13, 21–11	(gold) Winner	
2023	Guatemala International	(Mexico) Miriam Rodríguez	(Algeria) Koceila Mammeri (Algeria) Tanina Mammeri	17–21, 21–16, 19–21	(silver) Runner-up	
2023	Mexican International	(Mexico) Miriam Rodríguez	(Mexico) Irving Pérez (Mexico) Cecilia Madera	21–13, 21–11	(gold) Winner	
2024	Mexican International	(Mexico) Miriam Rodríguez	(Canada) Timothy Lock (Canada) Chloe Hoang	21–14, 21–19	(gold) Winner	
2024	Perú International Series	(Mexico) Miriam Rodríguez	(Brazil) Fabrício Farias (Brazil) Jaqueline Lima	21–15, 17–21, 21–18	(gold) Winner	
2024	Mexican International	(Mexico) Miriam Rodríguez	(Guatemala) Christopher Martínez (Guatemala) Diana Corleto	21–16, 21–11	(gold) Winner	
2025	Guatemala International	(Mexico) Miriam Rodríguez	(Canada) Timothy Lock (Canada) Chloe Hoang	14–21, 18–21	(silver) Runner-up	
2025	Mexican International	(Mexico) Miriam Rodríguez	(Mexico) Irving Pérez (Mexico) Cecilia Madera	21–13, 21–10	(gold) Winner	
2026	Mexican International	(Mexico) Miriam Rodríguez	(Mexico) Emiliano Carrera (Mexico) Sofia Ruiz Toledo	21–7, 21–12	(gold) Winner	

BWF International Challenge tournament
BWF International Series tournament
BWF Future Series tournament
