= Miriam Rodríguez (badminton) =

Mexican badminton player (born 2004)

Personal information
- Born: Miriam Jacqueline Rodríguez Pérez; 26 July 2004 (age 22) Guadalajara, Jalisco, Mexico

Sport
- Country: Mexico
- Sport: Badminton
- Handedness: Right

Women's singles & doubles
- Highest ranking: 214 (WS 24 October 2022); 62 (WD with Romina Fregoso, 2 September 2024); 53 (XD with Luis Montoya, 13 May 2024)
- BWF profile
Medal record
Women's badminton
Representing Mexico
Pan American Games
Bronze medal – third place	2023 Santiago	Women's doubles
Pan Am Championships
Bronze medal – third place	2025 Lima	Women's doubles
Central American and Caribbean Games
Gold medal – first place	2023 San Salvador	Mixed team
Gold medal – first place	2023 San Salvador	Women's doubles
Gold medal – first place	2023 San Salvador	Mixed doubles
Gold medal – first place	2026 Santo Domingo	Mixed team
Gold medal – first place	2026 Santo Domingo	Women's doubles
Gold medal – first place	2026 Santo Domingo	Mixed doubles

Miriam Jacqueline Rodríguez Pérez (born 26 July 2003) is a Mexican badminton player. Partnering with Romina Fregoso, she won the bronze medal at the 2023 Pan American Games, and the gold medal at the 2026 Central American and Caribbean Games. She was part of the Mexican team that won the gold medals at the 2023 and 2026 Central American and Caribbean Games.

== Achievements ==
=== Pan American Games ===
Women's doubles
Year	Venue	Partner	Opponent	Score	Result
2023	Olympic Training Center; Santiago, Chile	(Mexico) Romina Fregoso	(Canada) Catherine Choi (Canada) Josephine Wu	21–10, 21–7	Bronze

=== Pan Am Championships ===
Women's doubles
Year	Venue	Partner	Opponent	Score	Result
2025	Videna Poli 2 Lima, Peru	(Mexico) Romina Fregoso	(United States) Lauren Lam (United States) Allison Lee	8–21, 8–21	Bronze

=== Central American and Caribbean Games ===
Women's doubles
Year	Venue	Partner	Opponent	Score	Result
2023	Coliseo Complejo El Polvorín; San Salvador, El Salvador	(Mexico) Romina Fregoso	Diana Corleto; Nikté Sotomayor	18–21, 23–21, 21–16	Gold
2026	Pabellón de Tenis de Mesa; Santo Domingo Este, Dominican Republic	(Mexico) Romina Fregoso	(Cuba) Erly Cabrera (Cuba) Taymara Oropesa	21–9, 21–8	Gold

Mixed doubles
Year	Venue	Partner	Opponent	Score	Result
2023	Coliseo Complejo El Polvorín; San Salvador, El Salvador	(Mexico) Luis Montoya	Christopher Martínez; Mariana Paiz	21–5, 21–15	Gold
2026	Pabellón de Tenis de Mesa; Santo Domingo Este, Dominican Republic	(Mexico) Luis Montoya	(Guatemala) Christopher Martínez (Guatemala) Diana Corleto	12–21, 21–13, 21–15	Gold

=== BWF International Challenge/Series (12 titles, 8 runners-up) ===
Women's doubles
Year	Tournament	Partner	Opponent	Score	Result
2020	International Mexicano	(Mexico) Romina Fregoso	(Mexico) Jessica Bautista (Mexico) Vanessa Villalobos	10–21, 17–21	(silver) Runner-up
2023	Mexico Future Series	(Mexico) Romina Fregoso	(Mexico) Joceline Lopez (Mexico) Mayté Macias	21–13, 21–8	(gold) Winner
2023	Venezuela International	(Mexico) Romina Fregoso	(Mexico) Haramara Gaitán (Mexico) Sabrina Solís	Walkover	(gold) Winner
2024	Mexican International	(Mexico) Romina Fregoso	(Ukraine) Polina Buhrova (Ukraine) Yevheniia Kantemyr	12–21, 16–21	(silver) Runner-up
2024	Mexico Future Series	(Mexico) Romina Fregoso	(United States) Ella Lin (United States) Veronica Yang	14–21, 15–21	(silver) Runner-up
2024	Mexican International	(Mexico) Romina Fregoso	(Mexico) Cecilia Madera (Mexico) Isabella Puente	21–16, 21–17	(gold) Winner
2026	Mexican International	(Mexico) Romina Fregoso	(Japan) Rui Kiyama (Japan) Sona Yonemoto	10–21, 14–21	(silver) Runner-up
2026	Mexican International	(Mexico) Romina Fregoso	(Chinese Taipei) Hsieh Chih-ying (Chinese Taipei) Lee Yu-hsuan	15–21, 20–22	(silver) Runner-up

Mixed doubles
Year	Tournament	Partner	Opponent	Score	Result
2023	Santo Domingo Open	(Mexico) Luis Montoya	(Algeria) Koceila Mammeri (Algeria) Tanina Mammeri	13–21, 19–21	(silver) Runner-up
2023	Mexico Future Series	(Mexico) Luis Montoya	(Canada) Daniel Zhou (Canada) Chloe Hoang	21–13, 23–25, 21–14	(gold) Winner
2023	Venezuela International	(Mexico) Luis Montoya	(Mexico) Job Castillo (Mexico) Romina Fregoso	21–13, 21–11	(gold) Winner
2023	Guatemala International	(Mexico) Luis Montoya	(Algeria) Koceila Mammeri (Algeria) Tanina Mammeri	17–21, 21–16, 19–21	(silver) Runner-up
2023	Mexican International	(Mexico) Luis Montoya	(Mexico) Irving Pérez (Mexico) Cecilia Madera	21–13, 21–11	(gold) Winner
2024	Mexican International	(Mexico) Luis Montoya	(Canada) Timothy Lock (Canada) Chloe Hoang	21–14, 21–19	(gold) Winner
2024	Perú International Series	(Mexico) Luis Montoya	(Brazil) Fabricio Farias (Brazil) Jaqueline Lima	21–15, 17–21, 21–18	(gold) Winner
2024	Mexican International	(Mexico) Luis Montoya	(Guatemala) Christopher Martínez (Guatemala) Diana Corleto	21–16, 21–11	(gold) Winner
2025	Guatemala International	(Mexico) Luis Montoya	(Canada) Timothy Lock (Canada) Chloe Hoang	14–21, 18–21	(silver) Runner-up
2025	Venezuela Future Series	(Mexico) Maximiliano Peregrina Torres	(Azerbaijan) Ulvi Huseynov (Azerbaijan) Leyla Jamalzade	15–11, 15–9 (Note: The Venezuela Future Series 2025 tournament was one of 10 tournaments trialling BWF's new 3x15 scoring system)	(gold) Winner
2025	Mexican International	(Mexico) Luis Montoya	(Mexico) Irving Pérez (Mexico) Cecilia Madera	21–13, 21–10	(gold) Winner
2026	Mexican International	(Mexico) Luis Montoya	(Mexico) Emiliano Carrera (Mexico) Sofia Ruiz Toledo	21–7, 21–12	(gold) Winner

BWF International Challenge tournament
BWF International Series tournament
BWF Future Series tournament

=== Junior International Tournaments ===
Mixed doubles
Year	Tournament	Partner	Opponent	Score	Result
2021	Mexican Junior International	(Mexico) Cesar Franco Murgia	(Mexico) Rodrigo Morals (Mexico) Romina Fregoso	21–19, 16–21, 15–21	(silver) Runner-up
