= Luis Ramón Garrido =

Mexican badminton player (born 1996)

Personal information
- Born: Luis Ramón Garrido Esquivel; 10 May 1996 (age 30) Monterrey, Nuevo León, Mexico
- Years active: 9
- Height: 1.71 m (5 ft 7 in)
- Weight: 82 kg (181 lb)

Sport
- Country: Mexico
- Sport: Badminton

Men's singles & doubles
- Highest ranking: 65 (MS, 11 June 2024); 323 (MD, 1 October 2015)
- Current ranking: 67 (MS, 16 July 2024)
- BWF profile
Medal record
Men's badminton
Representing Mexico
Pan American Games
Bronze medal – third place	2023 Santiago	Men's singles
Pan Am Male Cup
Bronze medal – third place	2022 Acapulco	Men's team
Bronze medal – third place	2024 São Paulo	Men's team
Central American and Caribbean Games
Gold medal – first place	2023 San Salvador	Men's singles
Gold medal – first place	2023 San Salvador	Mixed team

Luis Ramón Garrido Esquivel (Note: In this Spanish name, the first or paternal surname is Garrido and the second or maternal family name is Esquivel.) (born 10 May 1996) is a Mexican badminton player from Monterrey, Nuevo León. He competed at the 2014 Summer Youth Olympics in Nanjing, China. Garrido won the gold medal in the men's singles at the 2023 Central American and Caribbean Games, and was part of the Mexican winning team at that Games. He also won the bronze medal at the 2023 Pan American Games and competed for Mexico at the 2024 Summer Olympics.

== Achievements ==
=== Pan American Games ===
Men's singles
Year	Venue	Opponent	Score	Result	Ref.
2023	Olympic Training Center; Santiago, Chile	Kevin Cordón (EAI)	17–21, 12–21	Bronze	

=== Central American and Caribbean Games ===
Men's singles
Year	Venue	Opponent	Score	Result	Ref.
2023	Coliseo Complejo El Polvorín; San Salvador, El Salvador	Yeison del Cid	21–11, 23–21	Gold	

=== BWF International Challenge/Series (11 titles, 3 runners-up) ===
Men's singles
Year	Tournament	Opponent	Score	Result
2014	Internacional Mexicano	(Mexico) Lino Muñoz	21–18, 19–21, 21–14	(gold) Winner
2015	Trinidad and Tobago International	(Canada) Martin Giuffre	21–18, 23–25, 20–22	(silver) Runner-up
2017	Peru International Series	(Indonesia) Ikhsan Rumbay	21–18, 21–14	(gold) Winner
2017	Mercosul International	(Portugal) Duarte Nuno Anjo	21–18, 21–16	(gold) Winner
2017	Santo Domingo Open	(Cuba) Osleni Guerrero	21–12, 16–21, 12–21	(silver) Runner-up
2017	Botswana International	(Italy) Rosario Maddaloni	21–13, 21–17	(gold) Winner
2018	Peru Future Series	(Mexico) Arturo Hernández	21–9, 21–8	(gold) Winner
2018	Cameroon International	(Czech Republic) Adam Mendrek	21–19, 21–9	(gold) Winner
2018	Côte d'Ivoire International	(Czech Republic) Adam Mendrek	21–15, 21–9	(gold) Winner
2023	Trinidad and Tobago International	(United States) Mark Alcala	19–21, 18–21	(silver) Runner-up
2023	Mexico Future Series	(United States) William Hu	21–11, 21–17	(gold) Winner
2023	Uganda International	(India) Vishal Vasudevan	22–20, 21–15	(gold) Winner
2023	Zambia International	(Norway) Markus Barth	22–20, 21–18	(gold) Winner

Men's doubles
Year	Tournament	Partner	Opponent	Score	Result
2015	Trinidad and Tobago International	(Mexico) Lino Muñoz	(Mexico) Job Castillo (Mexico) Antonio Ocegueda	21–16, 22–24, 21–19	(gold) Winner

BWF International Challenge tournament
BWF International Series tournament
BWF Future Series tournament
