= Uriel Canjura =

Salvadoran badminton player

Personal information
- Born: 12 September 2000 (age 26) Suchitoto, El Salvador.
- Height: 1.65 m (5 ft 5 in)
- Weight: 55 kg (121 lb)

Sport
- Country: El Salvador
- Sport: Badminton
- Handedness: Right

Men's singles
- Highest ranking: 49 (7 November 2023)
- Current ranking: 87 (6 October 2026)
- BWF profile
Medal record
Men's badminton
Representing El Salvador
Pan American Games
Bronze medal – third place	2023 Santiago	Men's singles
Pan Am Championships
Silver medal – second place	2023 Kingston	Men's singles
Silver medal – second place	2024 Guatemala City	Men's singles
Silver medal – second place	2026 Lima	Men's singles
Bronze medal – third place	2022 San Salvador	Men's singles
Central American and Caribbean Games
Bronze medal – third place	2026 Santo Domingo	Mixed team
Junior Pan American Games
Silver medal – second place	2021 Cali–Valle	Boys' singles
Silver medal – second place	2021 Cali–Valle	Mixed doubles

Uriel Francisco Canjura Artiga (born 12 September 2000) is a Salvadoran badminton player. He is a bronze medalist at the 2023 Pan American Games; and also the silver medalists at the 2023 and 2024 Pan Am Championships.

== Career ==
Canjura started playing badminton at the age of 9, when his stepfather Andrés Ardón, who was also a member of the Salvadoran Badminton Federation, became his first coach. Initially, he used to play soccer but later switched to badminton. Developing his skills in the sport, he went on to represent El Salvador at the 2018 Youth Olympics, where he was also chosen to be the flag bearer for his country. He studied general high school at the Agustina Charvin School in San Salvador and graduated in 2018. In his career so far, he has won international titles in El Salvador, Brazil, and Suriname, besides winning a silver medal at the Pan American Championships in 2024. Canjura qualified to compete at the 2024 Summer Olympics, and became the first ever Salvadoran badminton player at the Olympics. He was assigned as the country flag bearer during the parade of nations in the 2024 Summer Olympics opening ceremony.

== Achievements ==
=== Pan American Games ===
Men's singles
Year	Venue	Opponent	Score	Result	Ref.
2023	Olympic Training Center; Santiago, Chile	(Canada) Brian Yang	11–21, 10–21	Bronze	

=== Pan Am Championships ===
Men's singles
Year	Venue	Opponent	Score	Result
2022	Palacio de los Deportes Carlos "El Famoso" Hernández; San Salvador, El Salvador	(Guatemala) Kevin Cordón	18–21, 21–18, 13–21	Bronze
2023	G.C. Foster College of Physical Education and Sport; Kingston, Jamaica	(Canada) Brian Yang	10–21, 5–21	Silver
2024	Teodoro Palacios Flores Gymnasium; Guatemala City, Guatemala	(Guatemala) Kevin Cordón	21–14, 17–21, 13–21	Silver
2026	High Performance Center VIDENA; Lima, Peru	(Canada) Victor Lai	11–21, 9–21	Silver

=== Junior Pan American Games ===
Boys' singles
Year	Venue	Opponent	Score	Result
2021	Pacific Valley Events Center; Yumbo, Valle, Colombia	(Canada) Brian Yang	8–21, 6–21	Silver

Mixed doubles
Year	Venue	Partner	Opponent	Score	Result
2021	Pacific Valley Events Center; Yumbo, Valle, Colombia	(El Salvador) Fátima Centeno	(Canada) Brian Yang (Canada) Rachel Chan	13–21, 14–21	Silver

=== BWF International Challenge/Series (7 titles, 7 runners-up) ===
Men's singles
Year	Tournament	Opponent	Score	Result
2019	El Salvador International	(United States) Howard Shu	21–11, 11–21, 21–13	(gold) Winner
2021	El Salvador International	(Brazil) Donnians Oliveira	21–14, 21–12	(gold) Winner
2022	Brazil International	(Portugal) Bernardo Atilano	21–17, 21–15	(gold) Winner
2022	Guatemala International	(Italy) Giovanni Toti	20–22, 20–22	(silver) Runner-up
2022	Peru International	(Brazil) Jonathan Matías	12–21, 15–21	(silver) Runner-up
2022	El Salvador International	(Guatemala) Kevin Cordón	21–18, 21–23, 21–18	(gold) Winner
2023	Peru International	(Italy) Fabio Caponio	11–21, 18–21	(silver) Runner-up
2023	Suriname International	(Italy) Giovanni Toti	21–11, 21–12	(gold) Winner
2024	El Salvador International	(United States) Mark Alcala	14–21, 21–23	(silver) Runner-up
2025	Suriname International	(Switzerland) Julien Scheiwiller	18–21, 21–8, 21–9	(gold) Winner
2026	Giraldilla International	(Portugal) Bruno Carvalho	21–15, 21–12	(gold) Winner
2026	Paraguay Open	(Brazil) Donnians Oliveira	19–21, 21–19, 11–21	(silver) Runner-up

Men's doubles
Year	Tournament	Partner	Opponent	Score	Result
2026	Giraldilla International	(El Salvador) Manuel Mejía	(United States) Kathiravun Manivannan (United States) Mukil Nambikumar	21–16, 23–25, 21–10	(silver) Runner-up

Mixed doubles
Year	Tournament	Partner	Opponent	Score	Result
2017	Guatemala Future Series	(El Salvador) Fátima Centeno	(Guatemala) Jonathan Solís (Guatemala) Nikté Sotomayor	15–21, 12–21	(silver) Runner-up

BWF International Challenge tournament
BWF International Series tournament
BWF Future Series tournament

=== BWF Junior International (3 titles, 1 runner-up) ===
Boys' singles
Year	Tournament	Opponent	Score	Result
2016	Guatemala Junior International	(Mexico) Andrés Ramírez	21–12, 21–19	(gold) Winner
2016	Colombia Junior International	(Guatemala) Christopher Martínez	21–17, 21–10	(gold) Winner
2018	Mexican Junior International	(Brazil) Fabrício Farias	19–21, 14–21	(silver) Runner-up

Mixed doubles
Year	Tournament	Partner	Opponent	Score	Result
2016	Colombia Junior International	(El Salvador) Fátima Centeno	(Colombia) Yamit Gironza (Colombia) Tatiana Muñoz	21–12, 22–20	(gold) Winner

BWF Junior International Challenge tournament
BWF Junior International Series tournament
BWF Junior Future Series tournament

== Notes ==
Olympic Games
Preceded by Enrique Arathoon; Celina Márquez	Flag bearer for El Salvador; Paris 2024 with Celina Márquez	Succeeded by Incumbent
