= Vanessa Villalobos =

Mexican badminton player (born 2001)

Personal information
- Born: Vanessa Karmine Villalobos Vázquez; 26 October 2001 (age 25) Guadalajara, Jalisco, Mexico

Sport
- Country: Mexico
- Sport: Badminton

Women's singles & doubles
- Highest ranking: 166 (WS 12 October 2021); 139 (WD 2 February 2021); 84 (XD 19 October 2021)
- BWF profile
Medal record
Women's badminton
Representing Mexico
Pan Am Championships
Bronze medal – third place	2019 Aguascalientes	Women's doubles
Central American and Caribbean Games
Gold medal – first place	2026 Santo Domingo	Mixed team
Bronze medal – third place	2026 Santo Domingo	Women's doubles

Vanessa Karmine Villalobos Vázquez (born 26 October 2001) is a Mexican badminton player. She affiliate with Guadalajara, Jalisco team. She was part of Mexican winning team in the 2026 Central American and Caribbean Games.

== Achievements ==
=== Pan Am Championships ===
Women's doubles
Year	Venue	Partner	Opponent	Score	Result
2019	Gimnasio Olímpico; Aguascalientes, Mexico	(Mexico) Sabrina Solis	(Canada) Catherine Choi (Canada) Josephine Wu	9–21, 15–21	Bronze

=== Central American and Caribbean Games ===
Men's doubles
Year	Venue	Partner	Opponent	Score	Result
2026	Pabellón de Tenis de Mesa; Santo Domingo Este, Dominican Republic	(Mexico) Vanessa García	(Cuba) Erly Cabrera (Cuba) Taymara Oropesa	21–15, 20–22, 19–21	Bronze

=== BWF International Challenge/Series (3 titles, 6 runners-up) ===
Women's doubles
Year	Tournament	Partner	Opponent	Score	Result
2016	Internacional Mexicano	(Mexico) Natalia Leyva	(Mexico) Cynthia González (Mexico) Mariana Ugalde	16–21, 11–21	(silver) Runner-up
2019	Internacional Mexicano	(Mexico) Jessica Bautista	(United States) Breanna Chi (United States) Jennie Gai	10–21, 10–21	(silver) Runner-up
2020	Internacional Mexicano	(Mexico) Jessica Bautista	(Mexico) Romina Fregoso (Mexico) Miriam Rodríguez	21–10, 21–17	(gold) Winner

Mixed doubles
Year	Tournament	Partner	Opponent	Score	Result
2019	Mexico Future Series	(Mexico) Luis Montoya	(Cuba) Osleni Guerrero (Cuba) Taymara Oropesa	20–22, 21–15, 16–21	(silver) Runner-up
2019	Internacional Mexicano	(Mexico) Luis Montoya	(Brazil) Fabricio Farias (Brazil) Jaqueline Lima	21–19, 21–19	(gold) Winner
2020	Internacional Mexicano	(Mexico) Job Castillo	(Mexico) Andrés López (Mexico) Sabrina Solis	15–21, 21–18, 19–21	(silver) Runner-up
2021	Santo Domingo Open	(Mexico) Luis Montoya	(Guatemala) Jonathan Solís (Guatemala) Diana Corleto	21–17, 21–17	(gold) Winner
2021	Peru International	(Mexico) Luis Montoya	(Guatemala) Jonathan Solís (Guatemala) Diana Corleto	12–21, 7–21	(silver) Runner-up
2021	Mexican International	(Mexico) Luis Montoya	(United States) Vinson Chiu (United States) Jennie Gai	17–21, 18–21	(silver) Runner-up

BWF International Challenge tournament
BWF International Series tournament
BWF Future Series tournament
