= Job Castillo =

Mexican badminton player (born 1992)

Personal information
- Born: Job Castillo Galindo; 1 November 1992 (age 34)
- Height: 1.76 m (5 ft 9 in)
- Weight: 76 kg (168 lb)

Sport
- Country: Mexico
- Sport: Badminton

Men's singles & doubles
- Highest ranking: 88 (MS 30 June 2016); 38 (MD with Lino Muñoz 30 June 2016); 177 (XD with Sabrina Solis 18 June 2015)
- BWF profile
Medal record
Men's badminton
Representing Mexico
Pan American Games
Bronze medal – third place	2015 Toronto	Men's doubles
Bronze medal – third place	2023 Santiago	Men's doubles
Pan Am Championships
Gold medal – first place	2022 San Salvador	Men's doubles
Bronze medal – third place	2018 Guatemala City	Men's doubles
Bronze medal – third place	2019 Aguascalientes	Men's singles
Bronze medal – third place	2021 Guatemala City	Men's doubles
Bronze medal – third place	2024 Guatemala City	Men's doubles
Pan Am Male Cup
Silver medal – second place	2020 Salvador	Men's team
Bronze medal – third place	2022 Acapulco	Men's team
Bronze medal – third place	2024 São Paulo	Men's team
Central American and Caribbean Games
Gold medal – first place	2018 Barranquilla	Mixed team
Gold medal – first place	2023 San Salvador	Mixed team
Gold medal – first place	2026 Santo Domingo	Mixed team
Silver medal – second place	2014 Veracruz	Mixed doubles
Silver medal – second place	2014 Veracruz	Mixed team
Silver medal – second place	2023 San Salvador	Men's doubles
Silver medal – second place	2026 Santo Domingo	Men's doubles
Bronze medal – third place	2010 Mayagüez	Men's team
Bronze medal – third place	2014 Veracruz	Men's doubles
Bronze medal – third place	2026 Santo Domingo	Men's singles

Job Castillo Galindo (Note: In this Spanish name, the first or paternal surname is Castillo and the second or maternal family name is Galindo.) (born 1 November 1992) is a Mexican badminton player. He won the men's doubles title at the 2022 Pan Am Championships partnering Luis Montoya. He also claimed two bronze medals at the Pan American Games, in 2015 with Lino Muñoz, and in 2023 with Montoya.

Castillo was part of Mexican winning team at the 2018 and 2023 Central American and Caribbean Games. In his junior career, he competed at the 2010 Summer Youth Olympics in Singapore.

== Career ==
Castillo started to playing badminton aged seven, influenced by his sister who is a badminton coach. He affiliate with Code Jalisco team, and has won five National Championships title.

In 2026, Castillo competed in the Central American and Caribbean Games, winning a gold in the team event, a silver in the men's doubles and a bronze in the singles.

== Achievements ==
=== Pan American Games ===
Men's doubles
Year	Venue	Partner	Opponent	Score	Result
2015	Atos Markham Pan Am Centre; Toronto, Canada	(Mexico) Lino Muñoz	(United States) Phillip Chew (United States) Sattawat Pongnairat	19–21, 13–21	Bronze
2023	Olympic Training Center; Santiago, Chile	(Mexico) Luis Montoya	(Canada) Adam Dong (Canada) Nyl Yakura	10–21, 23–21, 23–25	Bronze

=== Pan Am Championships ===
Men's singles
Year	Venue	Opponent	Score	Result
2019	Gimnasio Olímpico; Aguascalientes, Mexico	(Guatemala) Kevin Cordón	9–21, 12–21	Bronze

Men's doubles
Year	Venue	Partner	Opponent	Score	Result
2018	Teodoro Palacios Flores Gymnasium; Guatemala City, Guatemala	(Mexico) Lino Muñoz	(United States) Phillip Chew (United States) Ryan Chew	22–24, 10–21	Bronze
2021	Sagrado Corazon de Jesus; Guatemala City, Guatemala	(Mexico) Luis Montoya	(United States) Phillip Chew (United States) Ryan Chew	17–21, 21–14, 23–25	Bronze
2022	Palacio de los Deportes Carlos "El Famoso" Hernández; San Salvador, El Salvador	(Mexico) Luis Montoya	(United States) Vinson Chiu (United States) Joshua Yuan	22–20, 11–8 retired	Gold
2024	Teodoro Palacios Flores Gymnasium; Guatemala City, Guatemala	(Mexico) Luis Montoya	(United States) Chen Zhi-yi (United States) Presley Smith	21–15, 13–21, 10–21	Bronze

=== Central American and Caribbean Games ===
Men's singles
Year	Venue	Opponent	Score	Result	Ref.
2026	Pabellón de Tenis de Mesa; Santo Domingo Este, Dominican Republic	(Guatemala) Kevin Cordón	22–20, 18–21, 16–21	Bronze	

Men's doubles
Year	Venue	Partner	Opponent	Score	Result	Ref.
2014	Omega Complex; Veracruz, Mexico	(Mexico) Antonio Ocegueda	(Guatemala) Kevin Cordón (Guatemala) Aníbal Marroquín	19–21, 15–21	Bronze	
2023	Coliseo Complejo El Polvorín; San Salvador, El Salvador	(Mexico) Luis Montoya	Aníbal Marroquín; Jonathan Solís	21–16, 14–21, 20–22	Silver	
2026	Pabellón de Tenis de Mesa; Santo Domingo Este, Dominican Republic	(Mexico) Armando Gaitán	(Guatemala) Christopher Martínez (Guatemala) Jonathan Solís	21–8, 17–21, 18–21	Silver	

Mixed doubles
Year	Venue	Partner	Opponent	Score	Result
2014	Omega Complex; Veracruz, Mexico	(Mexico) Sabrina Solis	(Cuba) Osleni Guerrero (Cuba) Taymara Oropesa	21–16, 14–21, 13–21	Silver

=== BWF International Challenge/Series (18 titles, 17 runners-up) ===
Men's singles
Year	Tournament	Opponent	Score	Result
2016	Manhattan Beach International	(Italy) Indra Bagus Ade Chandra	19–21, 12–21	(silver) Runner-up
2018	Dominican Open	(Dominican Republic) César Brito	21–14, 21–14	(gold) Winner
2019	Giraldilla International	(Azerbaijan) Azmy Qowimuramadhoni	21–12, 21–13	(gold) Winner
2019	Guatemala Future Series	(Guatemala) Rubén Castellanos	21–18, 21–15	(gold) Winner
2020	Internacional Mexicano	(United States) Howard Shu	21–7, 15–21, 21–11	(gold) Winner
2021	Internacional Mexicano	(Ukraine) Danylo Bosniuk	12–21, 13–21	(silver) Runner-up
2022	Mexico Future Series	(Mexico) Luis Montoya	16–21, 21–10, 20–22	(silver) Runner-up

Men's doubles
Year	Tournament	Partner	Opponent	Score	Result
2013	Internacional Mexicano	(Mexico) Antonio Ocegueda	(New Zealand) Kevin Dennerly-Minturn (New Zealand) Oliver Leydon-Davis	21–17, 12–21, 6–21	(silver) Runner-up
2014	Internacional Mexicano	(Mexico) Antonio Ocegueda	(Mexico) Arturo Hernández (Mexico) Lino Muñoz	21–14, 21–15	(gold) Winner
2015	Chile International	(Mexico) Lino Muñoz	(Guatemala) Rodolfo Ramírez (Guatemala) Jonathan Solís	21–17, 21–10	(gold) Winner
2015	Trinidad and Tobago International	(Mexico) Antonio Ocegueda	(Mexico) Luis Ramon Garrido (Mexico) Lino Muñoz	16–21, 24–22, 19–21	(silver) Runner-up
2015	Santo Domingo Open	(Mexico) Lino Muñoz	(Peru) Mario Cuba (Peru) Martín del Valle	21–18, 24–26, 21–17	(gold) Winner
2015	Internacional Mexicano	(Mexico) Lino Muñoz	(Brazil) Hugo Arthuso (Brazil) Daniel Paiola	13–21, 21–12, 22–20	(gold) Winner
2015	Argentina International	(Mexico) Lino Muñoz	(Guatemala) Daniel Humblers (Chile) Bastián Lizama	21–10, 21–15	(gold) Winner
2015	Brazil International	(Mexico) Lino Muñoz	(Brazil) Hugo Arthuso (Brazil) Daniel Paiola	21–18, 21–14	(gold) Winner
2015	Puerto Rico International	(Mexico) Lino Muñoz	(Czech Republic) Jan Fröhlich (Slovakia) Matej Hliničan	21–19, 22–20	(gold) Winner
2015	Suriname International	(Mexico) Lino Muñoz	(Italy) Giovanni Greco (Italy) Rosario Maddaloni	No Match	(gold) Winner
2016	Guatemala International	(Mexico) Lino Muñoz	(India) Alwin Francis (India) Tarun Kona	8–21, 14–21	(silver) Runner-up
2016	Peru International Series	(Mexico) Lino Muñoz	(India) Alwin Francis (India) Tarun Kona	8–21, 12–21	(silver) Runner-up
2017	Internacional Mexicano	(Mexico) Lino Muñoz	(Canada) Jason Ho-Shue (Canada) Nyl Yakura	21–18, 11–21, 17–21	(silver) Runner-up
2018	Peru International	(Mexico) Lino Muñoz	(United States) Enrico Asuncion (Philippines) Carlo Glenn Remo	21–19, 14–21, 18–21	(silver) Runner-up
2018	Dominican Open	(Mexico) Luis Montoya	(Dominican Republic) William Cabrera (Dominican Republic) Nelson Javier	21–18, 21–18	(gold) Winner
2019	Guatemala International	(Mexico) Luis Montoya	(Brazil) Fabrício Farias (Brazil) Francielton Farias	17–21, 10–21	(silver) Runner-up
2020	Internacional Mexicano	(Mexico) Sebastián Martínez	(Peru) José Guevara (Peru) Bryan Roque	21–14, 21–6	(gold) Winner
2021	Mexican International	(Mexico) Luis Montoya	(United States) Enrico Asuncion (United States) Vinson Chiu	21–16, 21–14	(gold) Winner
2022	Mexico Future Series	(Mexico) Luis Montoya	(England) Kern Pong Lap Kan (England) Larry Pong	23–21, 22–24, 20–22	(silver) Runner-up
2023	Santo Domingo Open	(Mexico) Luis Montoya	(Brazil) Fabrício Farias (Brazil) Davi Silva	23–21, 15–21, 21–19	(gold) Winner
2023	Venezuela International	(Mexico) Luis Montoya	(Dominican Republic) Yonatan Linarez (Dominican Republic) Angel Marinez	21–11, 21–12	(gold) Winner
2023	Guatemala International	(Mexico) Luis Montoya	(Algeria) Koceila Mammeri (Algeria) Youcef Sabri Medel	21–18, 21–17	(gold) Winner
2023	Mexican International	(Mexico) Luis Montoya	(United States) Zicheng Xu (United States) Tianqi Zhang	Walkover	(silver) Runner-up
2024	Iran Fajr International	(Mexico) Luis Montoya	(India) Krishna Prasad Garaga (India) Sai Pratheek K.	18–21, 19–21	(silver) Runner-up

Mixed doubles
Year	Tournament	Partner	Opponent	Score	Result
2014	Internacional Mexicano	(Mexico) Sabrina Solis	(Mexico) Lino Muñoz (Mexico) Cynthia González	21–16, 16–21, 13–21	(silver) Runner-up
2018	International Mexicano	(Mexico) Cynthia González	(India) Venkat Gaurav Prasad (India) Juhi Dewangan	21–18, 20–22, 15–21	(silver) Runner-up
2020	Internacional Mexicano	(Mexico) Vanessa Villalobos	(Mexico) Andrés López (Mexico) Sabrina Solis	15–21, 21–18, 19–21	(silver) Runner-up
2023	Venezuela International	(Mexico) Romina Fregoso	(Mexico) Luis Montoya (Mexico) Miriam Rodríguez	13–21, 11–21	(silver) Runner-up

BWF International Challenge tournament
BWF International Series tournament
BWF Future Series tournament
