= Jonathan Solís =

Guatemalan badminton player

Personal information
- Born: Jonathan Josué Solís Rivas; 21 August 1993 (age 33)
- Height: 1.80 m (5 ft 11 in)
- Weight: 83 kg (183 lb)

Sport
- Country: Guatemala
- Sport: Badminton

Men's & mixed doubles
- Highest ranking: 50 (MD with Rodolfo Ramírez 4 June 2015); 50 (XD with Diana Corleto 11 October 2022)
- BWF profile
Medal record
Men's badminton
Representing Guatemala
Pan American Championships
Silver medal – second place	2022 San Salvador	Mixed doubles
Bronze medal – third place	2013 Santo Domingo	Men's doubles
Bronze medal – third place	2018 Guatemala City	Men's doubles
Bronze medal – third place	2018 Guatemala City	Mixed doubles
Bronze medal – third place	2021 Guatemala City	Mixed doubles
Central American and Caribbean Games
Gold medal – first place	2010 Mayagüez	Men's team
Gold medal – first place	2014 Veracruz	Mixed team
Gold medal – first place	2026 Santo Domingo	Men's doubles
Silver medal – second place	2014 Veracruz	Men's doubles
Silver medal – second place	2026 Santo Domingo	Mixed team
Bronze medal – third place	2014 Veracruz	Mixed doubles
Representing Independent Athletes Team
Pan American Games
Bronze medal – third place	2023 Santiago	Men's doubles
Representing Centro Caribe Sports
Central American and Caribbean Games
Gold medal – first place	2023 San Salvador	Men's doubles
Silver medal – second place	2023 San Salvador	Mixed team
Bronze medal – third place	2023 San Salvador	Mixed doubles

Jonathan Josué Solís Rivas (Note: In this Spanish name, the first or paternal surname is Solís and the second or maternal family name is Rivas.) (born 21 August 1993) is a Guatemalan badminton player. He won the gold medal in the men's doubles at the 2023 Central American and Caribbean Games. He also part of Guatemala winning team at the 2010 and 2014 Central American and Caribbean Games. Solís was the bronze medalists at the 2023 Pan American Games in the men's doubles with Aníbal Marroquín; 2013 and 2018 Pan Am Championships partnered with Rodolfo Ramírez; also in the mixed doubles event in 2018 and 2021 Pan Am Championships with Diana Corleto.

== Achievements ==
=== Pan American Games ===
Men's doubles
Year	Venue	Partner	Opponent	Score	Result
2023	Olympic Training Center; Santiago, Chile	Aníbal Marroquín (EAI)	(Brazil) Fabrício Farias (Brazil) Davi Silva	18–21, 16–21	Bronze

=== Pan Am Championships ===
Men's doubles
Year	Venue	Partner	Opponent	Score	Result
2013	Palacio de los Deportes Virgilio Travieso Soto; Santo Domingo, Dominican Republic	(Guatemala) Rodolfo Ramírez	(Canada) Kevin Li (Canada) Nyl Yakura	17–21, 16–21	Bronze
2018	Teodoro Palacios Flores Gymnasium; Guatemala City, Guatemala	(Guatemala) Rodolfo Ramírez	(Canada) Jason Ho-Shue (Canada) Nyl Yakura	12–21, 11–21	Bronze

Mixed doubles
Year	Venue	Partner	Opponent	Score	Result
2018	Teodoro Palacios Flores Gymnasium; Guatemala City, Guatemala	(Guatemala) Diana Corleto	(Canada) Ty Alexander Lindeman (Canada) Josephine Wu	15–21, 14–21	Bronze
2021	Sagrado Corazon de Jesus; Guatemala City, Guatemala	(Guatemala) Diana Corleto	(Canada) Joshua Hurlburt-Yu (Canada) Josephine Wu	12–21, 17–21	Bronze
2022	Palacio de los Deportes Carlos "El Famoso" Hernández; San Salvador, El Salvador	(Guatemala) Diana Corleto	(Canada) Ty Alexander Lindeman (Canada) Josephine Wu	12–21, 11–21	Silver

=== Central American and Caribbean Games ===
Men's doubles
Year	Venue	Partner	Opponent	Score	Result
2014	Omega Complex; Veracruz, Mexico	(Guatemala) Rodolfo Ramírez	(Guatemala) Kevin Cordón (Guatemala) Aníbal Marroquín	20–22, 20–22	Silver
2023	Coliseo Complejo El Polvorín; San Salvador, El Salvador	Aníbal Marroquín	(Mexico) Job Castillo (Mexico) Luis Montoya	16–21, 21–14, 22–20	Gold
2026	Pabellón de Tenis de Mesa; Santo Domingo Este, Dominican Republic	(Guatemala) Christopher Martínez	(Mexico) Armando Gaitán (Mexico) Job Castillo	8–21, 21–17, 21–18	Gold

Mixed doubles
Year	Venue	Partner	Opponent	Score	Result
2014	Omega Complex; Veracruz, Mexico	(Guatemala) Nikté Sotomayor	(Mexico) Job Castillo (Mexico) Sabrina Solis	15–21, 19–21	Bronze
2023	Coliseo Complejo El Polvorín; San Salvador, El Salvador	Diana Corleto	Christopher Martínez; Mariana Paiz	21–10, 20–22, 18–21	Bronze

=== BWF International Challenge/Series (27 titles, 16 runner-up) ===
Men's doubles
Year	Tournament	Partner	Opponent	Score	Result
2012	Guatemala International	(Guatemala) Rodolfo Ramírez	(Scotland) Alistair Casey (Mexico) Andrés Quadri	21–14, 16–21, 21–13	(gold) Winner
2013	Guatemala International	(Guatemala) Rodolfo Ramírez	(Dominican Republic) Nelson Javier (Dominican Republic) Alberto Raposo	21–13, 21–18	(gold) Winner
2014	Giraldilla International	(Guatemala) Rodolfo Ramírez	(United States) Matthew Fogarty (United States) Bjorn Seguin	21–15, 21–11	(gold) Winner
2014	Mercosul International	(Guatemala) Rodolfo Ramírez	(Guatemala) Heymard Humblers (Guatemala) Aníbal Marroquín	21–14, 17–21, 13–21	(silver) Runner-up
2014	Argentina International	(Guatemala) Rodolfo Ramírez	(Brazil) Hugo Arthuso (Brazil) Daniel Paiola	21–15, 21–18	(gold) Winner
2014	Guatemala International	(Guatemala) Rodolfo Ramírez	(France) Laurent Constantin (France) Matthieu Lo Ying Ping	9–11, 7–11, 11–9, 11–9, 10–11	(silver) Runner-up
2015	Jamaica International	(Guatemala) Rodolfo Ramírez	(Turkey) Emre Vural (Turkey) Sinan Zorlu	18–21, 21–15, 21–12	(gold) Winner
2015	Chile International	(Guatemala) Rodolfo Ramírez	(Mexico) Job Castillo (Mexico) Lino Muñoz	17–21, 10–21	(silver) Runner-up
2016	Colombia International	(Guatemala) Rodolfo Ramírez	(Guatemala) Rubén Castellanos (Guatemala) Aníbal Marroquín	Walkover	(silver) Runner-up
2017	Guatemala Future Series	(Guatemala) Rodolfo Ramírez	(Guatemala) Rubén Castellanos (Guatemala) Aníbal Marroquín	21–17, 21–13	(gold) Winner
2017	Guatemala International	(Guatemala) Rodolfo Ramírez	(United States) Phillip Chew (United States) Ryan Chew	10–21, 16–21	(silver) Runner-up
2017	Mercosul International	(Guatemala) Rodolfo Ramírez	(Guatemala) Kevin Cordón (Guatemala) Aníbal Marroquín	15–21, 21–13, 21–13	(gold) Winner
2018	Santo Domingo Open	(Guatemala) Rodolfo Ramírez	(Canada) Joshua Hurlburt-Yu (Canada) Duncan Yao	19–21, 21–16, 17–21	(silver) Runner-up
2018	Suriname International	(Guatemala) Rodolfo Ramírez	(Jamaica) Dennis Coke (Jamaica) Anthony McNee	Walkover	(silver) Runner-up
2019	Jamaica International	(Guatemala) Rodolfo Ramírez	(Jamaica) Gareth Henry (Jamaica) Samuel Ricketts	21–8, 14–21, 21–18	(gold) Winner
2019	International Mexicano	(Guatemala) Aníbal Marroquín	(Mexico) Andrés López (Mexico) Lino Muñoz	21–16, 21–13	(gold) Winner
2019	Guatemala Future Series	(Guatemala) Aníbal Marroquín	(Guatemala) Brandon Alavardo (Guatemala) Christopher Martínez	21–16, 21–16	(gold) Winner
2019	El Salvador International	(Guatemala) Aníbal Marroquín	(Guatemala) Brandon Alavardo (Guatemala) Christopher Martínez	23–21, 21–17	(gold) Winner
2020	Jamaica International	(Guatemala) Aníbal Marroquín	(Jamaica) Samuel Ricketts (Jamaica) Shane Wilson	22–20, 21–15	(gold) Winner
2021	Santo Domingo Open	(Guatemala) Aníbal Marroquín	(Guatemala) Rubén Castellanos (Guatemala) Christopher Martínez	21–10, 21–19	(gold) Winner
2021	Peru International	(Guatemala) Aníbal Marroquín	(Algeria) Koceila Mammeri (Algeria) Youcef Sabri Medel	18–21, 15–21	(silver) Runner-up
2021	Guatemala International	(Guatemala) Aníbal Marroquín	(Canada) Kevin Lee (Canada) Ty Alexander Lindeman	21–19, 17–21, 10–21	(silver) Runner-up
2022	Brazil International	(Guatemala) Aníbal Marroquín	(Brazil) Fabrício Farias (Brazil) Francielton Farias	12–21, 17–21	(silver) Runner-up
2022	Guatemala International	(Guatemala) Aníbal Marroquín	(Guatemala) Rubén Castellanos (Guatemala) Christopher Martínez	18–21, 21–18, 21–8	(gold) Winner
2024	Guatemala Future Series	(Guatemala) Christopher Martínez	(Peru) Sharum Durand (Peru) José Guevara	21–16, 21–9	(gold) Winner
2024	Mexican International	(Guatemala) Christopher Martínez	(United States) Yu-Yuan Chang (Chinese Taipei) Wang Yen Pang	14–21, 21–15, 21–8	(gold) Winner
2025	Giraldilla International	(Guatemala) Christopher Martínez	(Cuba) Juan Carlos Bencomo (Cuba) Roberto Carlos Herrera	21–4, 21–10	(gold) Winner
2026	Perú International	(Guatemala) Christopher Martínez	(United States) Ryan Nibu (United States) Joshua Yang	18–21, 17–21	(silver) Runner-up

Mixed doubles
Year	Tournament	Partner	Opponent	Score	Result
2012	Guatemala International	(Guatemala) Ana Lucia de León	(Guatemala) Aníbal Marroquín (Guatemala) Nikté Sotomayor	21–13, 14–21, 19–21	(silver) Runner-up
2013	Guatemala International	(Guatemala) Nikté Sotomayor	(Dominican Republic) Nelson Javier (Dominican Republic) Berónica Vibieca	21–11, 19–21, 21–19	(gold) Winner
2015	Jamaica International	(Guatemala) Nikté Sotomayor	(Turkey) Ramazan Öztürk (Turkey) Neslihan Kılıç	18–21, 12–21	(silver) Runner-up
2016	Guatemala International	(Guatemala) Nikté Sotomayor	(United States) Bjorn Seguin (Mexico) Mariana Ugalde	21–8, 21–14	(gold) Winner
2016	Colombia International	(Guatemala) Nikté Sotomayor	(Colombia) Yamit Gironza (Colombia) Tatiana Muñoz	17–21, 21–14, 21–15	(gold) Winner
2017	Giraldilla International	(Guatemala) Mariana Paiz	(Cuba) Leodannis Martínez (Cuba) Taymara Oropesa	2–21, 13–21	(silver) Runner-up
2017	Guatemala Future Series	(Guatemala) Nikté Sotomayor	(El Salvador) Uriel Canjura (El Salvador) Fátima Centeno	21–15, 21–12	(gold) Winner
2019	Guatemala International	(Guatemala) Diana Corleto	(Brazil) Fabrício Farias (Brazil) Jaqueline Lima	Walkover	(silver) Runner-up
2019	El Salvador International	(Guatemala) Diana Corleto	(Guatemala) José Granados (Guatemala) Michele Barrios	21–17, 21–15	(gold) Winner
2020	Jamaica International	(Guatemala) Diana Corleto	(Jamaica) Dennis Coke (Jamaica) Tahlia Richardson	23–21, 21–17	(gold) Winner
2021	Santo Domingo Open	(Guatemala) Diana Corleto	(Mexico) Luis Montoya (Mexico) Vanessa Villalobos	17–21, 17–21	(silver) Runner-up
2021	Peru International	(Guatemala) Diana Corleto	(Mexico) Luis Montoya (Mexico) Vanessa Villalobos	21–12, 21–7	(gold) Winner
2021	Guatemala Future Series	(Guatemala) Diana Corleto	(Canada) Nicolas Nguyen (Canada) Alexandra Mocanu	18–21, 21–17, 21–15	(gold) Winner
2022	Brazil International	(Guatemala) Diana Corleto	(Brazil) Matheus Voigt (Brazil) Tamires Santos	21–17, 21–18	(gold) Winner
2022	Guatemala International	(Guatemala) Diana Corleto	(Guatemala) Christopher Martínez (Guatemala) Mariana Paiz	21–13, 18–21, 21–14	(gold) Winner

BWF International Challenge tournament
BWF International Series tournament
BWF Future Series tournament
