= 2018 BWF season =

Badminton circuit by the Badminton World Federation (BWF)

Details
- Duration: 9 January – 22 December
- Tournaments: 136
- Categories: Grade 1: 2 (Individuals, Teams); Grade 2 – BWF World Tour Finals: 1 Grade 2 – Super 1000: 3 Grade 2 – Super 750: 5 Grade 2 – Super 500: 7 Grade 2 – Super 300: 11; Grade 2 – Super 100: 11; Grade 3 – International Challenge: 22; Grade 3 – International Series: 37; Grade 3 – Future Series: 27; Continental Championships: 10

Achievements (singles)

Awards
- Player of the year: (Indonesia) Marcus Fernaldi Gideon & (Indonesia) Kevin Sanjaya Sukamuljo (Male) (China) Huang Yaqiong (Female)

The 2018 BWF season was the overall badminton circuit organized by the Badminton World Federation (BWF) for the 2018 badminton season to publish and promote the sport. The world badminton tournament in 2018 consisted of:

1. BWF Tournaments (Grade 1; Major Events)

- BWF Men and Women's World Team Championships (Thomas & Uber Cup)
- BWF World Championships

2. BWF World Tour (Grade 2)

- Level 1 (BWF World Tour Finals)
- Level 2 (BWF World Tour Super 1000)
- Level 3 (BWF World Tour Super 750)
- Level 4 (BWF World Tour Super 500)
- Level 5 (BWF World Tour Super 300)
- Level 6 (BWF Tour Super 100)

3. Continental Circuit (Grade 3) BWF Open Tournaments: BWF International Challenge, BWF International Series, and BWF Future Series.

The Thomas Cup & Uber Cup were teams events. The others – Super 1000, Super 750, Super 500, Super 300, Super 100, International Challenge, International Series, and Future Series were all individual tournaments. The higher the level of tournament, the larger the prize money and the more ranking points available.

The 2018 BWF season calendar comprised these six levels of BWF tournaments.

== Schedule ==
This is the complete schedule of events on the 2018 calendar, with the Champions and Runners-up documented.

Key

World Championships
World Tour Finals
Super 1000
Super 750
Super 500
Super 300
Super 100
International Challenge
International Series
Future Series
Team events

=== January ===
Week commencing	Tournament	Champions	Runners-up
8 January	Thailand Masters (Draw): Host: Bangkok, Thailand; Venue: Nimibutr Stadium; Level: Super 300; Prize: $150,000; Format: 32MS/32WS/32MD/32WD/32XD	(Indonesia) Tommy Sugiarto	(Malaysia) Leong Jun Hao
8 January	Thailand Masters (Draw): Host: Bangkok, Thailand; Venue: Nimibutr Stadium; Level: Super 300; Prize: $150,000; Format: 32MS/32WS/32MD/32WD/32XD	Score: 21–16, 21–15	
8 January	Thailand Masters (Draw): Host: Bangkok, Thailand; Venue: Nimibutr Stadium; Level: Super 300; Prize: $150,000; Format: 32MS/32WS/32MD/32WD/32XD	(Thailand) Nitchaon Jindapol	(Thailand) Pornpawee Chochuwong
8 January	Thailand Masters (Draw): Host: Bangkok, Thailand; Venue: Nimibutr Stadium; Level: Super 300; Prize: $150,000; Format: 32MS/32WS/32MD/32WD/32XD	Score: 21–11, 21–18	
8 January	Thailand Masters (Draw): Host: Bangkok, Thailand; Venue: Nimibutr Stadium; Level: Super 300; Prize: $150,000; Format: 32MS/32WS/32MD/32WD/32XD	(Thailand) Tinn Isriyanet (Thailand) Kittisak Namdash	(Indonesia) Wahyu Nayaka (Indonesia) Ade Yusuf
8 January	Thailand Masters (Draw): Host: Bangkok, Thailand; Venue: Nimibutr Stadium; Level: Super 300; Prize: $150,000; Format: 32MS/32WS/32MD/32WD/32XD	Score: 21–18, 11–21, 22–20	
8 January	Thailand Masters (Draw): Host: Bangkok, Thailand; Venue: Nimibutr Stadium; Level: Super 300; Prize: $150,000; Format: 32MS/32WS/32MD/32WD/32XD	(Thailand) Jongkolphan Kititharakul (Thailand) Rawinda Prajongjai	(Indonesia) Anggia Shitta Awanda (Indonesia) Ni Ketut Mahadewi Istarani
8 January	Thailand Masters (Draw): Host: Bangkok, Thailand; Venue: Nimibutr Stadium; Level: Super 300; Prize: $150,000; Format: 32MS/32WS/32MD/32WD/32XD	Score: 21–19, 21–17	
8 January	Thailand Masters (Draw): Host: Bangkok, Thailand; Venue: Nimibutr Stadium; Level: Super 300; Prize: $150,000; Format: 32MS/32WS/32MD/32WD/32XD	(Malaysia) Chan Peng Soon (Malaysia) Goh Liu Ying	(Thailand) Dechapol Puavaranukroh (Thailand) Puttita Supajirakul
8 January	Thailand Masters (Draw): Host: Bangkok, Thailand; Venue: Nimibutr Stadium; Level: Super 300; Prize: $150,000; Format: 32MS/32WS/32MD/32WD/32XD	Score: 21–15, 14–21, 21–16	
8 January	Estonian International: Host: Tallinn, Estonia; Venue: TTÜ Sports Hall; Level: International Series; Prize: $10,000; Format: 32MS/32WS/32MD/32WD/32XD	(France) Lucas Claerbout	(Sweden) Jacob Nilsson
8 January	Estonian International: Host: Tallinn, Estonia; Venue: TTÜ Sports Hall; Level: International Series; Prize: $10,000; Format: 32MS/32WS/32MD/32WD/32XD	Score: 21–16, 21–6	
8 January	Estonian International: Host: Tallinn, Estonia; Venue: TTÜ Sports Hall; Level: International Series; Prize: $10,000; Format: 32MS/32WS/32MD/32WD/32XD	(Israel) Ksenia Polikarpova	(Denmark) Michelle Skødstrup
8 January	Estonian International: Host: Tallinn, Estonia; Venue: TTÜ Sports Hall; Level: International Series; Prize: $10,000; Format: 32MS/32WS/32MD/32WD/32XD	Score: 21–13, 21–17	
8 January	Estonian International: Host: Tallinn, Estonia; Venue: TTÜ Sports Hall; Level: International Series; Prize: $10,000; Format: 32MS/32WS/32MD/32WD/32XD	(Russia) Andrey Parakhodin (Russia) Nikolai Ukk	(Germany) Peter Käsbauer (Germany) Johannes Pistorius
8 January	Estonian International: Host: Tallinn, Estonia; Venue: TTÜ Sports Hall; Level: International Series; Prize: $10,000; Format: 32MS/32WS/32MD/32WD/32XD	Score: 14–21, 21–18, 21–19	
8 January	Estonian International: Host: Tallinn, Estonia; Venue: TTÜ Sports Hall; Level: International Series; Prize: $10,000; Format: 32MS/32WS/32MD/32WD/32XD	(Russia) Ekaterina Bolotova (Russia) Alina Davletova	(England) Jessica Hopton (England) Jenny Moore
8 January	Estonian International: Host: Tallinn, Estonia; Venue: TTÜ Sports Hall; Level: International Series; Prize: $10,000; Format: 32MS/32WS/32MD/32WD/32XD	Score: 21–10, 21–10	
8 January	Estonian International: Host: Tallinn, Estonia; Venue: TTÜ Sports Hall; Level: International Series; Prize: $10,000; Format: 32MS/32WS/32MD/32WD/32XD	(Germany) Peter Käsbauer (Germany) Olga Konon	(England) Gregory Mairs (England) Jenny Moore
8 January	Estonian International: Host: Tallinn, Estonia; Venue: TTÜ Sports Hall; Level: International Series; Prize: $10,000; Format: 32MS/32WS/32MD/32WD/32XD	Score: 21–14, 21–12	
15 January	Malaysia Masters (Draw): Host: Kuala Lumpur, Malaysia; Venue: Axiata Arena; Level: Super 500; Prize: $350,000; Format: 32MS/32WS/32MD/32WD/32XD	(Denmark) Viktor Axelsen	(Japan) Kenta Nishimoto
15 January	Malaysia Masters (Draw): Host: Kuala Lumpur, Malaysia; Venue: Axiata Arena; Level: Super 500; Prize: $350,000; Format: 32MS/32WS/32MD/32WD/32XD	Score: 21–13, 21–23, 21–18	
15 January	Malaysia Masters (Draw): Host: Kuala Lumpur, Malaysia; Venue: Axiata Arena; Level: Super 500; Prize: $350,000; Format: 32MS/32WS/32MD/32WD/32XD	(Thailand) Ratchanok Intanon	(Chinese Taipei) Tai Tzu-ying
15 January	Malaysia Masters (Draw): Host: Kuala Lumpur, Malaysia; Venue: Axiata Arena; Level: Super 500; Prize: $350,000; Format: 32MS/32WS/32MD/32WD/32XD	Score: 21–16, 14–21, 24–22	
15 January	Malaysia Masters (Draw): Host: Kuala Lumpur, Malaysia; Venue: Axiata Arena; Level: Super 500; Prize: $350,000; Format: 32MS/32WS/32MD/32WD/32XD	(Indonesia) Fajar Alfian (Indonesia) Muhammad Rian Ardianto	(Malaysia) Goh V Shem (Malaysia) Tan Wee Kiong
15 January	Malaysia Masters (Draw): Host: Kuala Lumpur, Malaysia; Venue: Axiata Arena; Level: Super 500; Prize: $350,000; Format: 32MS/32WS/32MD/32WD/32XD	Score: 14–21, 24–22, 21–13	
15 January	Malaysia Masters (Draw): Host: Kuala Lumpur, Malaysia; Venue: Axiata Arena; Level: Super 500; Prize: $350,000; Format: 32MS/32WS/32MD/32WD/32XD	(Denmark) Kamilla Rytter Juhl (Denmark) Christinna Pedersen	(China) Chen Qingchen (China) Jia Yifan
15 January	Malaysia Masters (Draw): Host: Kuala Lumpur, Malaysia; Venue: Axiata Arena; Level: Super 500; Prize: $350,000; Format: 32MS/32WS/32MD/32WD/32XD	Score: 22–20, 21–18	
15 January	Malaysia Masters (Draw): Host: Kuala Lumpur, Malaysia; Venue: Axiata Arena; Level: Super 500; Prize: $350,000; Format: 32MS/32WS/32MD/32WD/32XD	(Hong Kong) Tang Chun Man (Hong Kong) Tse Ying Suet	(China) Zheng Siwei (China) Huang Yaqiong
15 January	Malaysia Masters (Draw): Host: Kuala Lumpur, Malaysia; Venue: Axiata Arena; Level: Super 500; Prize: $350,000; Format: 32MS/32WS/32MD/32WD/32XD	Score: 19–21, 22–20, 21–18	
15 January	Swedish Open: Host: Lund, Sweden; Venue: Sparbanken Skåne Arena; Level: International Series; Prize: $10,000; Format: 32MS/32WS/32MD/32WD/32XD	(India) Siddharth Pratap Singh	(Denmark) Mads Christophersen
15 January	Swedish Open: Host: Lund, Sweden; Venue: Sparbanken Skåne Arena; Level: International Series; Prize: $10,000; Format: 32MS/32WS/32MD/32WD/32XD	Score: 21–15, 21–11	
15 January	Swedish Open: Host: Lund, Sweden; Venue: Sparbanken Skåne Arena; Level: International Series; Prize: $10,000; Format: 32MS/32WS/32MD/32WD/32XD	(Denmark) Michelle Skødstrup	(Denmark) Julie Dawall Jakobsen
15 January	Swedish Open: Host: Lund, Sweden; Venue: Sparbanken Skåne Arena; Level: International Series; Prize: $10,000; Format: 32MS/32WS/32MD/32WD/32XD	Score: 21–13, 12–21, 21–19	
15 January	Swedish Open: Host: Lund, Sweden; Venue: Sparbanken Skåne Arena; Level: International Series; Prize: $10,000; Format: 32MS/32WS/32MD/32WD/32XD	(New Zealand) Oliver Leydon-Davis (Denmark) Lasse Mølhede	(Scotland) Martin Campbell (Scotland) Patrick MacHugh
15 January	Swedish Open: Host: Lund, Sweden; Venue: Sparbanken Skåne Arena; Level: International Series; Prize: $10,000; Format: 32MS/32WS/32MD/32WD/32XD	Score: 21–17, 21–12	
15 January	Swedish Open: Host: Lund, Sweden; Venue: Sparbanken Skåne Arena; Level: International Series; Prize: $10,000; Format: 32MS/32WS/32MD/32WD/32XD	(Sweden) Emma Karlsson (Sweden) Johanna Magnusson	(Netherlands) Debora Jille (Netherlands) Imke Van Der Aar
15 January	Swedish Open: Host: Lund, Sweden; Venue: Sparbanken Skåne Arena; Level: International Series; Prize: $10,000; Format: 32MS/32WS/32MD/32WD/32XD	Score: 18–21, 21–11, 21–19	
15 January	Swedish Open: Host: Lund, Sweden; Venue: Sparbanken Skåne Arena; Level: International Series; Prize: $10,000; Format: 32MS/32WS/32MD/32WD/32XD	(France) Thom Gicquel (France) Delphine Delrue	(Denmark) Kristoffer Knudsen (Denmark) Isabella Nielsen
15 January	Swedish Open: Host: Lund, Sweden; Venue: Sparbanken Skåne Arena; Level: International Series; Prize: $10,000; Format: 32MS/32WS/32MD/32WD/32XD	Score: 21–16, 21–10	
22 January	Indonesia Masters (Draw): Host: Jakarta, Indonesia; Venue: Istora Senayan; Level: Super 500; Prize: $350,000; Format: 32MS/32WS/32MD/32WS/32XD	(Indonesia) Anthony Sinisuka Ginting	(Japan) Kazumasa Sakai
22 January	Indonesia Masters (Draw): Host: Jakarta, Indonesia; Venue: Istora Senayan; Level: Super 500; Prize: $350,000; Format: 32MS/32WS/32MD/32WS/32XD	Score: 21–13, 21–12	
22 January	Indonesia Masters (Draw): Host: Jakarta, Indonesia; Venue: Istora Senayan; Level: Super 500; Prize: $350,000; Format: 32MS/32WS/32MD/32WS/32XD	(Chinese Taipei) Tai Tzu-ying	(India) Saina Nehwal
22 January	Indonesia Masters (Draw): Host: Jakarta, Indonesia; Venue: Istora Senayan; Level: Super 500; Prize: $350,000; Format: 32MS/32WS/32MD/32WS/32XD	Score: 21–9, 21–13	
22 January	Indonesia Masters (Draw): Host: Jakarta, Indonesia; Venue: Istora Senayan; Level: Super 500; Prize: $350,000; Format: 32MS/32WS/32MD/32WS/32XD	(Indonesia) Marcus Fernaldi Gideon (Indonesia) Kevin Sanjaya Sukamuljo	(China) Li Junhui (China) Liu Yuchen
22 January	Indonesia Masters (Draw): Host: Jakarta, Indonesia; Venue: Istora Senayan; Level: Super 500; Prize: $350,000; Format: 32MS/32WS/32MD/32WS/32XD	Score: 11–21, 21–10, 21–16	
22 January	Indonesia Masters (Draw): Host: Jakarta, Indonesia; Venue: Istora Senayan; Level: Super 500; Prize: $350,000; Format: 32MS/32WS/32MD/32WS/32XD	(Japan) Misaki Matsutomo (Japan) Ayaka Takahashi	(Indonesia) Greysia Polii (Indonesia) Apriyani Rahayu
22 January	Indonesia Masters (Draw): Host: Jakarta, Indonesia; Venue: Istora Senayan; Level: Super 500; Prize: $350,000; Format: 32MS/32WS/32MD/32WS/32XD	Score: 21–17, 21–12	
22 January	Indonesia Masters (Draw): Host: Jakarta, Indonesia; Venue: Istora Senayan; Level: Super 500; Prize: $350,000; Format: 32MS/32WS/32MD/32WS/32XD	(China) Zheng Siwei (China) Huang Yaqiong	(Indonesia) Tontowi Ahmad (Indonesia) Liliyana Natsir
22 January	Indonesia Masters (Draw): Host: Jakarta, Indonesia; Venue: Istora Senayan; Level: Super 500; Prize: $350,000; Format: 32MS/32WS/32MD/32WS/32XD	Score: 21–14, 21–11	
22 January	Iceland International: Host: Reykjavík, Iceland; Venue: Tennis og Badmintonfélag Reykjavíkur; Level: International Series; Prize: $10,000; Format: 32MS/32WS/32MD/32WS/32XD	(England) Sam Parsons	(India) Bodhit Joshi
22 January	Iceland International: Host: Reykjavík, Iceland; Venue: Tennis og Badmintonfélag Reykjavíkur; Level: International Series; Prize: $10,000; Format: 32MS/32WS/32MD/32WS/32XD	Score: 21–14, 21–17	
22 January	Iceland International: Host: Reykjavík, Iceland; Venue: Tennis og Badmintonfélag Reykjavíkur; Level: International Series; Prize: $10,000; Format: 32MS/32WS/32MD/32WS/32XD	(India) Saili Rane	(India) Vaishnavi Reddy Jakka
22 January	Iceland International: Host: Reykjavík, Iceland; Venue: Tennis og Badmintonfélag Reykjavíkur; Level: International Series; Prize: $10,000; Format: 32MS/32WS/32MD/32WS/32XD	Score: 22–20, 21–12	
22 January	Iceland International: Host: Reykjavík, Iceland; Venue: Tennis og Badmintonfélag Reykjavíkur; Level: International Series; Prize: $10,000; Format: 32MS/32WS/32MD/32WS/32XD	(Scotland) Alexander Dunn (Scotland) Adam Hall	(Denmark) Nicklas Mathiasen (Denmark) Mikkel Stoffersen
22 January	Iceland International: Host: Reykjavík, Iceland; Venue: Tennis og Badmintonfélag Reykjavíkur; Level: International Series; Prize: $10,000; Format: 32MS/32WS/32MD/32WS/32XD	Score: 21–16, 21–18	
22 January	Iceland International: Host: Reykjavík, Iceland; Venue: Tennis og Badmintonfélag Reykjavíkur; Level: International Series; Prize: $10,000; Format: 32MS/32WS/32MD/32WS/32XD	(Scotland) Julie MacPherson (Scotland) Eleanor O'Donnell	(Denmark) Emilie Furbo (Denmark) Trine Villadsen
22 January	Iceland International: Host: Reykjavík, Iceland; Venue: Tennis og Badmintonfélag Reykjavíkur; Level: International Series; Prize: $10,000; Format: 32MS/32WS/32MD/32WS/32XD	Score: 17–21, 21–13, 21–17	
22 January	Iceland International: Host: Reykjavík, Iceland; Venue: Tennis og Badmintonfélag Reykjavíkur; Level: International Series; Prize: $10,000; Format: 32MS/32WS/32MD/32WS/32XD	(India) Rohan Kapoor (India) Kuhoo Garg	(Denmark) Kristoffer Knudsen (Denmark) Isabella Nielsen
22 January	Iceland International: Host: Reykjavík, Iceland; Venue: Tennis og Badmintonfélag Reykjavíkur; Level: International Series; Prize: $10,000; Format: 32MS/32WS/32MD/32WS/32XD	Score: 16–21, 21–19, 21–18	
29 January	India Open (Draw): Host: New Delhi, India; Venue: Siri Fort Indoor Stadium; Level: Super 500; Prize: $350,000; Format: 32MS/32WS/32MD/32WS/32XD	(China) Shi Yuqi	(Chinese Taipei) Chou Tien-chen
29 January	India Open (Draw): Host: New Delhi, India; Venue: Siri Fort Indoor Stadium; Level: Super 500; Prize: $350,000; Format: 32MS/32WS/32MD/32WS/32XD	Score: 21–18, 21–14	
29 January	India Open (Draw): Host: New Delhi, India; Venue: Siri Fort Indoor Stadium; Level: Super 500; Prize: $350,000; Format: 32MS/32WS/32MD/32WS/32XD	(United States) Beiwen Zhang	(India) P. V. Sindhu
29 January	India Open (Draw): Host: New Delhi, India; Venue: Siri Fort Indoor Stadium; Level: Super 500; Prize: $350,000; Format: 32MS/32WS/32MD/32WS/32XD	Score: 21–18, 11–21, 22–20	
29 January	India Open (Draw): Host: New Delhi, India; Venue: Siri Fort Indoor Stadium; Level: Super 500; Prize: $350,000; Format: 32MS/32WS/32MD/32WS/32XD	(Indonesia) Marcus Fernaldi Gideon (Indonesia) Kevin Sanjaya Sukamuljo	(Denmark) Kim Astrup (Denmark) Anders Skaarup Rasmussen
29 January	India Open (Draw): Host: New Delhi, India; Venue: Siri Fort Indoor Stadium; Level: Super 500; Prize: $350,000; Format: 32MS/32WS/32MD/32WS/32XD	Score: 21–14, 21–16	
29 January	India Open (Draw): Host: New Delhi, India; Venue: Siri Fort Indoor Stadium; Level: Super 500; Prize: $350,000; Format: 32MS/32WS/32MD/32WS/32XD	(Indonesia) Greysia Polii (Indonesia) Apriyani Rahayu	(Thailand) Jongkolphan Kititharakul (Thailand) Rawinda Prajongjai
29 January	India Open (Draw): Host: New Delhi, India; Venue: Siri Fort Indoor Stadium; Level: Super 500; Prize: $350,000; Format: 32MS/32WS/32MD/32WS/32XD	Score: 21–18, 21–15	
29 January	India Open (Draw): Host: New Delhi, India; Venue: Siri Fort Indoor Stadium; Level: Super 500; Prize: $350,000; Format: 32MS/32WS/32MD/32WS/32XD	(Denmark) Mathias Christiansen (Denmark) Christinna Pedersen	(Indonesia) Praveen Jordan (Indonesia) Melati Daeva Oktavianti
29 January	India Open (Draw): Host: New Delhi, India; Venue: Siri Fort Indoor Stadium; Level: Super 500; Prize: $350,000; Format: 32MS/32WS/32MD/32WS/32XD	Score: 21–14, 21–15	
29 January	North Harbour International: Host: Auckland, New Zealand; Venue: Badminton North Harbour Centre; Level: Future Series; Prize: $5,000; Format: 64MS/32WS/32MD/32WS/32XD	(New Zealand) Oscar Guo	(New Zealand) Abhinav Manota
29 January	North Harbour International: Host: Auckland, New Zealand; Venue: Badminton North Harbour Centre; Level: Future Series; Prize: $5,000; Format: 64MS/32WS/32MD/32WS/32XD	Score: 21–14, 21–10	
29 January	North Harbour International: Host: Auckland, New Zealand; Venue: Badminton North Harbour Centre; Level: Future Series; Prize: $5,000; Format: 64MS/32WS/32MD/32WS/32XD	(Indonesia) Jesica Muljati	(Australia) Louisa Ma
29 January	North Harbour International: Host: Auckland, New Zealand; Venue: Badminton North Harbour Centre; Level: Future Series; Prize: $5,000; Format: 64MS/32WS/32MD/32WS/32XD	Score: 21–11, 21–12	
29 January	North Harbour International: Host: Auckland, New Zealand; Venue: Badminton North Harbour Centre; Level: Future Series; Prize: $5,000; Format: 64MS/32WS/32MD/32WS/32XD	(New Zealand) Kevin Dennerly-Minturn (New Zealand) Oliver Leydon-Davis	(New Zealand) Jonathan Curtin (New Zealand) Dhanny Oud
29 January	North Harbour International: Host: Auckland, New Zealand; Venue: Badminton North Harbour Centre; Level: Future Series; Prize: $5,000; Format: 64MS/32WS/32MD/32WS/32XD	Score: 21–13, 21–14	
29 January	North Harbour International: Host: Auckland, New Zealand; Venue: Badminton North Harbour Centre; Level: Future Series; Prize: $5,000; Format: 64MS/32WS/32MD/32WS/32XD	(Australia) Leanne Choo (Australia) Renuga Veeran	(New Zealand) Sally Fu (New Zealand) Susannah Leydon-Davis
29 January	North Harbour International: Host: Auckland, New Zealand; Venue: Badminton North Harbour Centre; Level: Future Series; Prize: $5,000; Format: 64MS/32WS/32MD/32WS/32XD	Score: 21–6, 21–12	
29 January	North Harbour International: Host: Auckland, New Zealand; Venue: Badminton North Harbour Centre; Level: Future Series; Prize: $5,000; Format: 64MS/32WS/32MD/32WS/32XD	(New Zealand) Maika Phillips (New Zealand) Anona Pak	(Brazil) Fabricio Farias (Brazil) Jaqueline Lima
29 January	North Harbour International: Host: Auckland, New Zealand; Venue: Badminton North Harbour Centre; Level: Future Series; Prize: $5,000; Format: 64MS/32WS/32MD/32WS/32XD	Score: 21–6, 27–25	

=== February ===
Week commencing	Tournament	Champions	Runners-up
5 February	Iran Fajr International: Host: Zanjan, Iran; Venue: Enghelab Sports Complex; Level: International Challenge; Prize: $25,000; Format: 64MS/32WS/32MD/16WD	(Vietnam) Phạm Cao Cường	(Vietnam) Nguyễn Tiến Minh
5 February	Iran Fajr International: Host: Zanjan, Iran; Venue: Enghelab Sports Complex; Level: International Challenge; Prize: $25,000; Format: 64MS/32WS/32MD/16WD	Score: 15–14, 13–11, 11–13, 11–7	
5 February	Iran Fajr International: Host: Zanjan, Iran; Venue: Enghelab Sports Complex; Level: International Challenge; Prize: $25,000; Format: 64MS/32WS/32MD/16WD	(Malaysia) Thinaah Muralitharan	(Malaysia) Lee Ying Ying
5 February	Iran Fajr International: Host: Zanjan, Iran; Venue: Enghelab Sports Complex; Level: International Challenge; Prize: $25,000; Format: 64MS/32WS/32MD/16WD	Score: 11–8, 11–6, 9–11, 11–9	
5 February	Iran Fajr International: Host: Zanjan, Iran; Venue: Enghelab Sports Complex; Level: International Challenge; Prize: $25,000; Format: 64MS/32WS/32MD/16WD	(India) Alwin Francis (India) K. Nandagopal	(India) Tarun Kona (India) Saurabh Sharma
5 February	Iran Fajr International: Host: Zanjan, Iran; Venue: Enghelab Sports Complex; Level: International Challenge; Prize: $25,000; Format: 64MS/32WS/32MD/16WD	Score: 9–11, 11–6, 7–11, 11–8, 11–9	
5 February	Iran Fajr International: Host: Zanjan, Iran; Venue: Enghelab Sports Complex; Level: International Challenge; Prize: $25,000; Format: 64MS/32WS/32MD/16WD	(Iran) Setayesh Abdolkarimi (Iran) Hamedanchi Azad Hale	(Iran) Samin Abedkhojasteh (Iran) Hediyeh Shams
5 February	Iran Fajr International: Host: Zanjan, Iran; Venue: Enghelab Sports Complex; Level: International Challenge; Prize: $25,000; Format: 64MS/32WS/32MD/16WD	Score: 11–3, 11–9, 11–5	
5 February	Algeria International: Host: Algiers, Algeria; Venue: Hacène Harcha Arena; Level: Future Series; Prize: N/A; Format: 32MS/32WS/16MD/8WD/16XD	(Morocco) Bilal Elharab	(Egypt) Mohamed Mostafa Kamel
5 February	Algeria International: Host: Algiers, Algeria; Venue: Hacène Harcha Arena; Level: Future Series; Prize: N/A; Format: 32MS/32WS/16MD/8WD/16XD	Score: 21–13, 21–9	
5 February	Algeria International: Host: Algiers, Algeria; Venue: Hacène Harcha Arena; Level: Future Series; Prize: N/A; Format: 32MS/32WS/16MD/8WD/16XD	(Algeria) Halla Bouksani	(Algeria) Linda Mazri
5 February	Algeria International: Host: Algiers, Algeria; Venue: Hacène Harcha Arena; Level: Future Series; Prize: N/A; Format: 32MS/32WS/16MD/8WD/16XD	Score: 21–9, 21–12	
5 February	Algeria International: Host: Algiers, Algeria; Venue: Hacène Harcha Arena; Level: Future Series; Prize: N/A; Format: 32MS/32WS/16MD/8WD/16XD	(Algeria) Mohamed Abderrahime Belarbi (Algeria) Adel Hamek	(Algeria) Majed Yacine Balahoune (Algeria) Mohamed Amine Guelmaoui
5 February	Algeria International: Host: Algiers, Algeria; Venue: Hacène Harcha Arena; Level: Future Series; Prize: N/A; Format: 32MS/32WS/16MD/8WD/16XD	Score: 21–18, 21–13	
5 February	Algeria International: Host: Algiers, Algeria; Venue: Hacène Harcha Arena; Level: Future Series; Prize: N/A; Format: 32MS/32WS/16MD/8WD/16XD	(Egypt) Doha Hany (Egypt) Hadia Hosny	(Algeria) Halla Bouksani (Algeria) Linda Mazri
5 February	Algeria International: Host: Algiers, Algeria; Venue: Hacène Harcha Arena; Level: Future Series; Prize: N/A; Format: 32MS/32WS/16MD/8WD/16XD	Score: 21–19, 21–11	
5 February	Algeria International: Host: Algiers, Algeria; Venue: Hacène Harcha Arena; Level: Future Series; Prize: N/A; Format: 32MS/32WS/16MD/8WD/16XD	(Algeria) Mohamed Amine Guelmaoui (Algeria) Malak Ouchefoune	(Egypt) Mohamed Mostafa Kamel (Egypt) Jana Ashraf
5 February	Algeria International: Host: Algiers, Algeria; Venue: Hacène Harcha Arena; Level: Future Series; Prize: N/A; Format: 32MS/32WS/16MD/8WD/16XD	Score: 21–16, 21–7	
5 February	Oceania Team Championships (Draw): Host: Hamilton, New Zealand; Venue: Eastlink Badminton Stadium; Level: Continental Team Championships; Format: 4MT/4WT (Round robin)	Australia	New Zealand
5 February	Oceania Team Championships (Draw): Host: Hamilton, New Zealand; Venue: Eastlink Badminton Stadium; Level: Continental Team Championships; Format: 4MT/4WT (Round robin)	Score: Round robin	
5 February	Oceania Team Championships (Draw): Host: Hamilton, New Zealand; Venue: Eastlink Badminton Stadium; Level: Continental Team Championships; Format: 4MT/4WT (Round robin)	Australia	New Zealand
5 February	Oceania Team Championships (Draw): Host: Hamilton, New Zealand; Venue: Eastlink Badminton Stadium; Level: Continental Team Championships; Format: 4MT/4WT (Round robin)	Score: Round robin	
5 February	Badminton Asia Team Championships (Draw): Host: Alor Setar, Malaysia; Venue: Sultan Abdul Halim Stadium; Level: Continental Team Championships; Format: 15MT/13WT	Indonesia	China
5 February	Badminton Asia Team Championships (Draw): Host: Alor Setar, Malaysia; Venue: Sultan Abdul Halim Stadium; Level: Continental Team Championships; Format: 15MT/13WT	Jonatan Christie; Mohammad Ahsan / Angga Pratama; Anthony Sinisuka Ginting; Rian Agung Saputro / Hendra Setiawan; Firman Abdul Kholik	Shi Yuqi; He Jiting / Tan Qiang; Qiao Bin; Han Chengkai / Zhou Haodong; Zhao Junpeng
5 February	Badminton Asia Team Championships (Draw): Host: Alor Setar, Malaysia; Venue: Sultan Abdul Halim Stadium; Level: Continental Team Championships; Format: 15MT/13WT	Score: 3–1	
5 February	Badminton Asia Team Championships (Draw): Host: Alor Setar, Malaysia; Venue: Sultan Abdul Halim Stadium; Level: Continental Team Championships; Format: 15MT/13WT	Japan	China
5 February	Badminton Asia Team Championships (Draw): Host: Alor Setar, Malaysia; Venue: Sultan Abdul Halim Stadium; Level: Continental Team Championships; Format: 15MT/13WT	Akane Yamaguchi; Misaki Matsutomo / Ayaka Takahashi; Nozomi Okuhara; Yuki Fukushima / Sayaka Hirota; Sayaka Sato	Chen Yufei; Du Yue / Li Yinhui; He Bingjiao; Cao Tongwei / Zheng Yu; Gao Fangjie
5 February	Badminton Asia Team Championships (Draw): Host: Alor Setar, Malaysia; Venue: Sultan Abdul Halim Stadium; Level: Continental Team Championships; Format: 15MT/13WT	Score: 3–0	
5 February	Oceania Badminton Championships (Draw): Host: Hamilton, New Zealand; Venue: Eastlink Badminton Stadium; Level: Continental Championships; Format: 64MS/32WS/32MD/32WD/32XD	(New Zealand) Abhinav Manota	(French Polynesia) Remi Rossi
5 February	Oceania Badminton Championships (Draw): Host: Hamilton, New Zealand; Venue: Eastlink Badminton Stadium; Level: Continental Championships; Format: 64MS/32WS/32MD/32WD/32XD	Score: 21–12, 21–14	
5 February	Oceania Badminton Championships (Draw): Host: Hamilton, New Zealand; Venue: Eastlink Badminton Stadium; Level: Continental Championships; Format: 64MS/32WS/32MD/32WD/32XD	(Australia) Chen Hsuan-yu	(Australia) Louisa Ma
5 February	Oceania Badminton Championships (Draw): Host: Hamilton, New Zealand; Venue: Eastlink Badminton Stadium; Level: Continental Championships; Format: 64MS/32WS/32MD/32WD/32XD	Score: 21–7, 21–14	
5 February	Oceania Badminton Championships (Draw): Host: Hamilton, New Zealand; Venue: Eastlink Badminton Stadium; Level: Continental Championships; Format: 64MS/32WS/32MD/32WD/32XD	(Australia) Matthew Chau (Australia) Sawan Serasinghe	(Australia) Robin Middleton (Australia) Ross Smith
5 February	Oceania Badminton Championships (Draw): Host: Hamilton, New Zealand; Venue: Eastlink Badminton Stadium; Level: Continental Championships; Format: 64MS/32WS/32MD/32WD/32XD	Score: 21–17, 23–21	
5 February	Oceania Badminton Championships (Draw): Host: Hamilton, New Zealand; Venue: Eastlink Badminton Stadium; Level: Continental Championships; Format: 64MS/32WS/32MD/32WD/32XD	(Australia) Setyana Mapasa (Australia) Gronya Somerville	(Australia) Leanne Choo (Australia) Renuga Veeran
5 February	Oceania Badminton Championships (Draw): Host: Hamilton, New Zealand; Venue: Eastlink Badminton Stadium; Level: Continental Championships; Format: 64MS/32WS/32MD/32WD/32XD	Score: 21–14, 22–20	
5 February	Oceania Badminton Championships (Draw): Host: Hamilton, New Zealand; Venue: Eastlink Badminton Stadium; Level: Continental Championships; Format: 64MS/32WS/32MD/32WD/32XD	(Australia) Sawan Serasinghe (Australia) Setyana Mapasa	(Australia) Matthew Chau (Australia) Leanne Choo
5 February	Oceania Badminton Championships (Draw): Host: Hamilton, New Zealand; Venue: Eastlink Badminton Stadium; Level: Continental Championships; Format: 64MS/32WS/32MD/32WD/32XD	Score: 21–19, 21–18	
12 February	African Team Championship (Draw): Host: Algiers, Algeria; Venue: Hacène Harcha Arena; Level: Continental Team Championships; Format: 12MT/7WT	Algeria	Nigeria
12 February	African Team Championship (Draw): Host: Algiers, Algeria; Venue: Hacène Harcha Arena; Level: Continental Team Championships; Format: 12MT/7WT	Mohamed Abderrahime Belarbi; Youcef Sabri Medel; Koceila Mammeri; Mohamed Abderrahime Belarbi / Youcef Sabri Medel; Majed Yacine Balahoune / Koceila Mammeri	Clement Krobakpo; Anuoluwapo Juwon Opeyori; Godwin Olofua; Enejoh Abah / Clement Krobakpo; Godwin Olofua / Anuoluwapo Juwon Opeyori
12 February	African Team Championship (Draw): Host: Algiers, Algeria; Venue: Hacène Harcha Arena; Level: Continental Team Championships; Format: 12MT/7WT	Score: 3–2	
12 February	African Team Championship (Draw): Host: Algiers, Algeria; Venue: Hacène Harcha Arena; Level: Continental Team Championships; Format: 12MT/7WT	Mauritius	Nigeria
12 February	African Team Championship (Draw): Host: Algiers, Algeria; Venue: Hacène Harcha Arena; Level: Continental Team Championships; Format: 12MT/7WT	Kate Foo Kune; Aurélie Allet; Nicki Chan-Lam; Aurélie Allet / Kobita Dookhee; Nicki Chan-Lam / Kate Foo Kune	Dorcas Ajoke Adesokan; Zainab Momoh; Uchechukwu Deborah Ukeh; Dorcas Ajoke Adesokan / Uchechukwu Deborah Ukeh; Zainab Momoh / Peace Orji
12 February	African Team Championship (Draw): Host: Algiers, Algeria; Venue: Hacène Harcha Arena; Level: Continental Team Championships; Format: 12MT/7WT	Score: 3–0	
12 February	European Team Championships (Draw): Host: Kazan, Russia; Venue: Gymnastics Centre Kazan; Level: Continental Team Championships; Format: 29MT/24WT (Round robin)	Denmark	England
12 February	European Team Championships (Draw): Host: Kazan, Russia; Venue: Gymnastics Centre Kazan; Level: Continental Team Championships; Format: 29MT/24WT (Round robin)	Anders Antonsen; Mads Conrad-Petersen / Mads Pieler Kolding; Emil Holst; Kim Astrup / Mathias Christiansen; Jan Ø. Jørgensen	Rajiv Ouseph; Marcus Ellis / Chris Langridge; Sam Parsons; Peter Briggs / Sean Vendy; David Jones
12 February	European Team Championships (Draw): Host: Kazan, Russia; Venue: Gymnastics Centre Kazan; Level: Continental Team Championships; Format: 29MT/24WT (Round robin)	Score: 3–1	
12 February	European Team Championships (Draw): Host: Kazan, Russia; Venue: Gymnastics Centre Kazan; Level: Continental Team Championships; Format: 29MT/24WT (Round robin)	Denmark	Germany
12 February	European Team Championships (Draw): Host: Kazan, Russia; Venue: Gymnastics Centre Kazan; Level: Continental Team Championships; Format: 29MT/24WT (Round robin)	Mia Blichfeldt; Kamilla Rytter Juhl / Christinna Pedersen; Line Kjærsfeldt; Maiken Fruergaard / Sara Thygesen; Natalia Koch Rohde	Fabienne Deprez; Isabel Herttrich / Olga Konon; Luise Heim; Johanna Goliszewski / Carla Nelte; Yvonne Li
12 February	European Team Championships (Draw): Host: Kazan, Russia; Venue: Gymnastics Centre Kazan; Level: Continental Team Championships; Format: 29MT/24WT (Round robin)	Score: 3–1	
12 February	Pan Am Team Championships (Draw): Host: Tacarigua, Trinidad and Tobago; Venue: National Racket Centre; Level: Continental Team Championships; Format: 7MT/6WT	Canada	United States
12 February	Pan Am Team Championships (Draw): Host: Tacarigua, Trinidad and Tobago; Venue: National Racket Centre; Level: Continental Team Championships; Format: 7MT/6WT	Jason Ho-Shue; Brian Yang; Jason Ho-Shue / Nyl Yakura; Paul-Antoine Dostie-Gundon; Ty Alexander Lindeman / Duncan Yao	Sattawat Pongnairat; Calvin Lin; Phillip Chew / Sattawat Pongnairat; Ricky Liuzhou; Ryan Chew / Calvin Lin
12 February	Pan Am Team Championships (Draw): Host: Tacarigua, Trinidad and Tobago; Venue: National Racket Centre; Level: Continental Team Championships; Format: 7MT/6WT	Score: 3–0	
12 February	Pan Am Team Championships (Draw): Host: Tacarigua, Trinidad and Tobago; Venue: National Racket Centre; Level: Continental Team Championships; Format: 7MT/6WT	Canada	United States
12 February	Pan Am Team Championships (Draw): Host: Tacarigua, Trinidad and Tobago; Venue: National Racket Centre; Level: Continental Team Championships; Format: 7MT/6WT	Michelle Li; Brittney Tam; Anne-Julie Beaulieu / Stephanie Pakenham; Talia Ng; Catherine Choi / Josephine Wu	Jamie Subandhi; Jamie Hsu; Natalie Chi / Angela Zhang; Lauren Lam; Jamie Hsu / Jamie Subandhi
12 February	Pan Am Team Championships (Draw): Host: Tacarigua, Trinidad and Tobago; Venue: National Racket Centre; Level: Continental Team Championships; Format: 7MT/6WT	Score: 3–0	
12 February	African Badminton Championships (Draw): Host: Algiers, Algeria; Venue: Hacène Harcha Arena; Level: Continental Championships; Format: 64MS/64WS/32MD/32WD/32XD	(Mauritius) Julien Paul	(Nigeria) Habeeb Temitope Bello
12 February	African Badminton Championships (Draw): Host: Algiers, Algeria; Venue: Hacène Harcha Arena; Level: Continental Championships; Format: 64MS/64WS/32MD/32WD/32XD	Score: 21–16, 15–21, 21–13	
12 February	African Badminton Championships (Draw): Host: Algiers, Algeria; Venue: Hacène Harcha Arena; Level: Continental Championships; Format: 64MS/64WS/32MD/32WD/32XD	(Mauritius) Kate Foo Kune	(Nigeria) Dorcas Ajoke Adesokan
12 February	African Badminton Championships (Draw): Host: Algiers, Algeria; Venue: Hacène Harcha Arena; Level: Continental Championships; Format: 64MS/64WS/32MD/32WD/32XD	Score: 21–16, 21–19	
12 February	African Badminton Championships (Draw): Host: Algiers, Algeria; Venue: Hacène Harcha Arena; Level: Continental Championships; Format: 64MS/64WS/32MD/32WD/32XD	(Algeria) Mohamed Abderrahime Belarbi (Algeria) Adel Hamek	(Algeria) Koceila Mammeri (Algeria) Youcef Sabri Medel
12 February	African Badminton Championships (Draw): Host: Algiers, Algeria; Venue: Hacène Harcha Arena; Level: Continental Championships; Format: 64MS/64WS/32MD/32WD/32XD	Score: 21–18, 20–22, 21–18	
12 February	African Badminton Championships (Draw): Host: Algiers, Algeria; Venue: Hacène Harcha Arena; Level: Continental Championships; Format: 64MS/64WS/32MD/32WD/32XD	(Seychelles) Juliette Ah-Wan (Seychelles) Allisen Camille	(Egypt) Doha Hany (Egypt) Hadia Hosny
12 February	African Badminton Championships (Draw): Host: Algiers, Algeria; Venue: Hacène Harcha Arena; Level: Continental Championships; Format: 64MS/64WS/32MD/32WD/32XD	Score: 21–18, 13–21, 21–18	
12 February	African Badminton Championships (Draw): Host: Algiers, Algeria; Venue: Hacène Harcha Arena; Level: Continental Championships; Format: 64MS/64WS/32MD/32WD/32XD	(Algeria) Koceila Mammeri (Algeria) Linda Mazri	(Nigeria) Enejoh Abah (Nigeria) Peace Orji
12 February	African Badminton Championships (Draw): Host: Algiers, Algeria; Venue: Hacène Harcha Arena; Level: Continental Championships; Format: 64MS/64WS/32MD/32WD/32XD	Score: 21–17, 15–21, 21–12	
19 February	Swiss Open (Draw): Host: Basel, Switzerland; Venue: St. Jakobshalle; Level: Super 300; Prize: $150,000; Format: 32MS/32WS/32MD/32WD/32XD	(India) Sameer Verma	(Denmark) Jan Ø. Jørgensen
19 February	Swiss Open (Draw): Host: Basel, Switzerland; Venue: St. Jakobshalle; Level: Super 300; Prize: $150,000; Format: 32MS/32WS/32MD/32WD/32XD	Score: 21–15, 21–13	
19 February	Swiss Open (Draw): Host: Basel, Switzerland; Venue: St. Jakobshalle; Level: Super 300; Prize: $150,000; Format: 32MS/32WS/32MD/32WD/32XD	(Japan) Sayaka Takahashi	(Japan) Natsuki Nidaira
19 February	Swiss Open (Draw): Host: Basel, Switzerland; Venue: St. Jakobshalle; Level: Super 300; Prize: $150,000; Format: 32MS/32WS/32MD/32WD/32XD	Score: 21–12, 21–18	
19 February	Swiss Open (Draw): Host: Basel, Switzerland; Venue: St. Jakobshalle; Level: Super 300; Prize: $150,000; Format: 32MS/32WS/32MD/32WD/32XD	(Denmark) Mathias Boe (Denmark) Carsten Mogensen	(Thailand) Tinn Isriyanet (Thailand) Kittisak Namdash
19 February	Swiss Open (Draw): Host: Basel, Switzerland; Venue: St. Jakobshalle; Level: Super 300; Prize: $150,000; Format: 32MS/32WS/32MD/32WD/32XD	Score: 21–15, 21–11	
19 February	Swiss Open (Draw): Host: Basel, Switzerland; Venue: St. Jakobshalle; Level: Super 300; Prize: $150,000; Format: 32MS/32WS/32MD/32WD/32XD	(Japan) Ayako Sakuramoto (Japan) Yukiko Takahata	(Bulgaria) Gabriela Stoeva (Bulgaria) Stefani Stoeva
19 February	Swiss Open (Draw): Host: Basel, Switzerland; Venue: St. Jakobshalle; Level: Super 300; Prize: $150,000; Format: 32MS/32WS/32MD/32WD/32XD	Score: 19–21, 21–15, 21–18	
19 February	Swiss Open (Draw): Host: Basel, Switzerland; Venue: St. Jakobshalle; Level: Super 300; Prize: $150,000; Format: 32MS/32WS/32MD/32WD/32XD	(Germany) Mark Lamsfuß (Germany) Isabel Herttrich	(England) Marcus Ellis (England) Lauren Smith
19 February	Swiss Open (Draw): Host: Basel, Switzerland; Venue: St. Jakobshalle; Level: Super 300; Prize: $150,000; Format: 32MS/32WS/32MD/32WD/32XD	Score: 22–20, 21–19	
19 February	Austrian International: Host: Vienna, Austria; Venue: Wiener Stadthalle; Level: International Challenge; Prize: $25,000; Format: 32MS/32WS/32MD/32WD/32XD	(India) Kashyap Parupalli	(Malaysia) Cheam June Wei
19 February	Austrian International: Host: Vienna, Austria; Venue: Wiener Stadthalle; Level: International Challenge; Prize: $25,000; Format: 32MS/32WS/32MD/32WD/32XD	Score: 23–21, 21–14	
19 February	Austrian International: Host: Vienna, Austria; Venue: Wiener Stadthalle; Level: International Challenge; Prize: $25,000; Format: 32MS/32WS/32MD/32WD/32XD	(Denmark) Anna Thea Madsen	(Thailand) Pattarasuda Chaiwan
19 February	Austrian International: Host: Vienna, Austria; Venue: Wiener Stadthalle; Level: International Challenge; Prize: $25,000; Format: 32MS/32WS/32MD/32WD/32XD	Score: 23–21, 21–17	
19 February	Austrian International: Host: Vienna, Austria; Venue: Wiener Stadthalle; Level: International Challenge; Prize: $25,000; Format: 32MS/32WS/32MD/32WD/32XD	(Chinese Taipei) Lu Chen (Chinese Taipei) Ye Hong-wei	(New Zealand) Oliver Leydon-Davis (Denmark) Lasse Mølhede
19 February	Austrian International: Host: Vienna, Austria; Venue: Wiener Stadthalle; Level: International Challenge; Prize: $25,000; Format: 32MS/32WS/32MD/32WD/32XD	Score: 25–23, 21–17	
19 February	Austrian International: Host: Vienna, Austria; Venue: Wiener Stadthalle; Level: International Challenge; Prize: $25,000; Format: 32MS/32WS/32MD/32WD/32XD	(Japan) Chisato Hoshi (Japan) Kie Nakanishi	(Japan) Sayaka Hobara (Japan) Natsuki Sone
19 February	Austrian International: Host: Vienna, Austria; Venue: Wiener Stadthalle; Level: International Challenge; Prize: $25,000; Format: 32MS/32WS/32MD/32WD/32XD	Score: 21–15, 21–18	
19 February	Austrian International: Host: Vienna, Austria; Venue: Wiener Stadthalle; Level: International Challenge; Prize: $25,000; Format: 32MS/32WS/32MD/32WD/32XD	(Russia) Evgenij Dremin (Russia) Evgenia Dimova	(Denmark) Lasse Mølhede (Denmark) Sara Lundgaard
19 February	Austrian International: Host: Vienna, Austria; Venue: Wiener Stadthalle; Level: International Challenge; Prize: $25,000; Format: 32MS/32WS/32MD/32WD/32XD	Score: 21–15, 21–13	
19 February	Uganda International: Host: Kampala, Uganda; Venue: Lugogo Indoor Stadium; Level: International Series; Prize: $10,000; Format: 32MS/32WS/32MD/16WD/32XD	(France) Pierrick Cajot	(Germany) Jonathan Persson
19 February	Uganda International: Host: Kampala, Uganda; Venue: Lugogo Indoor Stadium; Level: International Series; Prize: $10,000; Format: 32MS/32WS/32MD/16WD/32XD	Score: 21–17, 21–11	
19 February	Uganda International: Host: Kampala, Uganda; Venue: Lugogo Indoor Stadium; Level: International Series; Prize: $10,000; Format: 32MS/32WS/32MD/16WD/32XD	(Mauritius) Kate Foo Kune	(Egypt) Hadia Hosny
19 February	Uganda International: Host: Kampala, Uganda; Venue: Lugogo Indoor Stadium; Level: International Series; Prize: $10,000; Format: 32MS/32WS/32MD/16WD/32XD	Score: 21–19, 21–10	
19 February	Uganda International: Host: Kampala, Uganda; Venue: Lugogo Indoor Stadium; Level: International Series; Prize: $10,000; Format: 32MS/32WS/32MD/16WD/32XD	(Kazakhstan) Artur Niyazov (Kazakhstan) Dmitriy Panarin	(Jordan) Bahaedeen Ahmad Alshannik (Jordan) Mohd Naser Mansour Nayef
19 February	Uganda International: Host: Kampala, Uganda; Venue: Lugogo Indoor Stadium; Level: International Series; Prize: $10,000; Format: 32MS/32WS/32MD/16WD/32XD	Score: 21–18, 21–10	
19 February	Uganda International: Host: Kampala, Uganda; Venue: Lugogo Indoor Stadium; Level: International Series; Prize: $10,000; Format: 32MS/32WS/32MD/16WD/32XD	(Egypt) Doha Hany (Egypt) Hadia Hosny	(Zambia) Evelyn Siamupangila (Zambia) Ogar Siamupangila
19 February	Uganda International: Host: Kampala, Uganda; Venue: Lugogo Indoor Stadium; Level: International Series; Prize: $10,000; Format: 32MS/32WS/32MD/16WD/32XD	Score: 21–17, 21–18	
19 February	Uganda International: Host: Kampala, Uganda; Venue: Lugogo Indoor Stadium; Level: International Series; Prize: $10,000; Format: 32MS/32WS/32MD/16WD/32XD	(Germany) Jonathan Persson (Mauritius) Kate Foo Kune	(Mauritius) Julien Paul (Mauritius) Aurélie Allet
19 February	Uganda International: Host: Kampala, Uganda; Venue: Lugogo Indoor Stadium; Level: International Series; Prize: $10,000; Format: 32MS/32WS/32MD/16WD/32XD	Score: 21–11, 21–18	
26 February	Jamaica International: Host: Kingston, Jamaica; Venue: National Indoor Sport Centre; Level: International Series; Prize: $10,000; Format: 32MS/32WS/32MD/16WD/32XD	(Canada) Jason Ho-Shue	(Canada) Xiaodong Sheng
26 February	Jamaica International: Host: Kingston, Jamaica; Venue: National Indoor Sport Centre; Level: International Series; Prize: $10,000; Format: 32MS/32WS/32MD/16WD/32XD	Score: 21–6, 21–13	
26 February	Jamaica International: Host: Kingston, Jamaica; Venue: National Indoor Sport Centre; Level: International Series; Prize: $10,000; Format: 32MS/32WS/32MD/16WD/32XD	(United States) Jamie Hsu	(Peru) Daniela Macías
26 February	Jamaica International: Host: Kingston, Jamaica; Venue: National Indoor Sport Centre; Level: International Series; Prize: $10,000; Format: 32MS/32WS/32MD/16WD/32XD	Score: 22–20, 21–8	
26 February	Jamaica International: Host: Kingston, Jamaica; Venue: National Indoor Sport Centre; Level: International Series; Prize: $10,000; Format: 32MS/32WS/32MD/16WD/32XD	(India) Tarun Kona (India) Saurabh Sharma	(Jamaica) Gareth Henry (Jamaica) Samuel Ricketts
26 February	Jamaica International: Host: Kingston, Jamaica; Venue: National Indoor Sport Centre; Level: International Series; Prize: $10,000; Format: 32MS/32WS/32MD/16WD/32XD	Score: 21–17, 21–17	
26 February	Jamaica International: Host: Kingston, Jamaica; Venue: National Indoor Sport Centre; Level: International Series; Prize: $10,000; Format: 32MS/32WS/32MD/16WD/32XD	(United States) Jamie Hsu (United States) Jamie Subandhi	(Peru) Inés Castillo (Peru) Paula la Torre
26 February	Jamaica International: Host: Kingston, Jamaica; Venue: National Indoor Sport Centre; Level: International Series; Prize: $10,000; Format: 32MS/32WS/32MD/16WD/32XD	Score: 21–15, 21–8	
26 February	Jamaica International: Host: Kingston, Jamaica; Venue: National Indoor Sport Centre; Level: International Series; Prize: $10,000; Format: 32MS/32WS/32MD/16WD/32XD	(Cuba) Osleni Guerrero (Cuba) Yeily Ortiz	(Cuba) Leodannis Martínez (Cuba) Taymara Oropesa
26 February	Jamaica International: Host: Kingston, Jamaica; Venue: National Indoor Sport Centre; Level: International Series; Prize: $10,000; Format: 32MS/32WS/32MD/16WD/32XD	Score:22–20, 21–15	
26 February	Slovak Open: Host: Trenčín, Slovakia; Venue: M-Sport Trenčín; Level: Future Series; Prize: N/A; Format: 32MS/32WS/32MD/32WD/32XD	(Indonesia) Andre Marteen	(Poland) Adrian Dziółko
26 February	Slovak Open: Host: Trenčín, Slovakia; Venue: M-Sport Trenčín; Level: Future Series; Prize: N/A; Format: 32MS/32WS/32MD/32WD/32XD	Score: 21–12, 21–14	
26 February	Slovak Open: Host: Trenčín, Slovakia; Venue: M-Sport Trenčín; Level: Future Series; Prize: N/A; Format: 32MS/32WS/32MD/32WD/32XD	(Hong Kong) Deng Joy Xuan	(Chinese Taipei) Lin Hsiang-ti
26 February	Slovak Open: Host: Trenčín, Slovakia; Venue: M-Sport Trenčín; Level: Future Series; Prize: N/A; Format: 32MS/32WS/32MD/32WD/32XD	Score: 21–11, 21–13	
26 February	Slovak Open: Host: Trenčín, Slovakia; Venue: M-Sport Trenčín; Level: Future Series; Prize: N/A; Format: 32MS/32WS/32MD/32WD/32XD	(Chinese Taipei) Lu Chen (Chinese Taipei) Ye Hong-wei	(Thailand) Pakin Kuna-anuvit (Thailand) Natthapat Trinkajee
26 February	Slovak Open: Host: Trenčín, Slovakia; Venue: M-Sport Trenčín; Level: Future Series; Prize: N/A; Format: 32MS/32WS/32MD/32WD/32XD	Score: 21–18, 22–20	
26 February	Slovak Open: Host: Trenčín, Slovakia; Venue: M-Sport Trenčín; Level: Future Series; Prize: N/A; Format: 32MS/32WS/32MD/32WD/32XD	(Chinese Taipei) Li Zi-qing (Chinese Taipei) Teng Chun-hsun	(Thailand) Ruethaichanok Laisuan (Thailand) Supamart Mingchua
26 February	Slovak Open: Host: Trenčín, Slovakia; Venue: M-Sport Trenčín; Level: Future Series; Prize: N/A; Format: 32MS/32WS/32MD/32WD/32XD	Score: 22–20, 19–21, 21–5	
26 February	Slovak Open: Host: Trenčín, Slovakia; Venue: M-Sport Trenčín; Level: Future Series; Prize: N/A; Format: 32MS/32WS/32MD/32WD/32XD	(Chinese Taipei) Ye Hong-wei (Chinese Taipei) Teng Chun-hsun	(Thailand) Pakin Kuna-anuvit (Thailand) Supissara Paewsampran
26 February	Slovak Open: Host: Trenčín, Slovakia; Venue: M-Sport Trenčín; Level: Future Series; Prize: N/A; Format: 32MS/32WS/32MD/32WD/32XD	Score: 21–16, 21–16	

=== March ===
Week commencing	Tournament	Champions	Runners-up
5 March	German Open (Draw): Host: Mülheim, Germany; Venue: Innogy Sporthalle; Level: Super 300; Prize: $150,000; Format: 32MS/32WS/32MD/32WD/32XD	(Chinese Taipei) Chou Tien-chen	(Hong Kong) Ng Ka Long
5 March	German Open (Draw): Host: Mülheim, Germany; Venue: Innogy Sporthalle; Level: Super 300; Prize: $150,000; Format: 32MS/32WS/32MD/32WD/32XD	Score: 21–19, 18–21, 21–18	
5 March	German Open (Draw): Host: Mülheim, Germany; Venue: Innogy Sporthalle; Level: Super 300; Prize: $150,000; Format: 32MS/32WS/32MD/32WD/32XD	(Japan) Akane Yamaguchi	(China) Chen Yufei
5 March	German Open (Draw): Host: Mülheim, Germany; Venue: Innogy Sporthalle; Level: Super 300; Prize: $150,000; Format: 32MS/32WS/32MD/32WD/32XD	Score: 21–19, 6–21, 21–12	
5 March	German Open (Draw): Host: Mülheim, Germany; Venue: Innogy Sporthalle; Level: Super 300; Prize: $150,000; Format: 32MS/32WS/32MD/32WD/32XD	(Japan) Takuto Inoue (Japan) Yuki Kaneko	(Indonesia) Fajar Alfian (Indonesia) Muhammad Rian Ardianto
5 March	German Open (Draw): Host: Mülheim, Germany; Venue: Innogy Sporthalle; Level: Super 300; Prize: $150,000; Format: 32MS/32WS/32MD/32WD/32XD	Score: 21–16, 21–18	
5 March	German Open (Draw): Host: Mülheim, Germany; Venue: Innogy Sporthalle; Level: Super 300; Prize: $150,000; Format: 32MS/32WS/32MD/32WD/32XD	(Japan) Yuki Fukushima (Japan) Sayaka Hirota	(China) Huang Dongping (China) Zheng Yu
5 March	German Open (Draw): Host: Mülheim, Germany; Venue: Innogy Sporthalle; Level: Super 300; Prize: $150,000; Format: 32MS/32WS/32MD/32WD/32XD	Score: 18–21, 21–14, 21–6	
5 March	German Open (Draw): Host: Mülheim, Germany; Venue: Innogy Sporthalle; Level: Super 300; Prize: $150,000; Format: 32MS/32WS/32MD/32WD/32XD	(Malaysia) Goh Soon Huat (Malaysia) Shevon Jemie Lai	(Denmark) Niclas Nøhr (Denmark) Sara Thygesen
5 March	German Open (Draw): Host: Mülheim, Germany; Venue: Innogy Sporthalle; Level: Super 300; Prize: $150,000; Format: 32MS/32WS/32MD/32WD/32XD	Score: 21–14, 22–20	
5 March	Brazil International: Host: Foz do Iguacu, Brazil; Venue: Costa Cavalcante; Level: International Challenge; Prize: $25,000; Format: 32MS/32WS/16MD/8WD/16XD	(Brazil) Ygor Coelho	(Russia) Sergey Sirant
5 March	Brazil International: Host: Foz do Iguacu, Brazil; Venue: Costa Cavalcante; Level: International Challenge; Prize: $25,000; Format: 32MS/32WS/16MD/8WD/16XD	Score: 21–18, 21–14	
5 March	Brazil International: Host: Foz do Iguacu, Brazil; Venue: Costa Cavalcante; Level: International Challenge; Prize: $25,000; Format: 32MS/32WS/16MD/8WD/16XD	(Canada) Rachel Honderich	(Switzerland) Sabrina Jaquet
5 March	Brazil International: Host: Foz do Iguacu, Brazil; Venue: Costa Cavalcante; Level: International Challenge; Prize: $25,000; Format: 32MS/32WS/16MD/8WD/16XD	Score: 21–15, 15–21, 21–14	
5 March	Brazil International: Host: Foz do Iguacu, Brazil; Venue: Costa Cavalcante; Level: International Challenge; Prize: $25,000; Format: 32MS/32WS/16MD/8WD/16XD	(Canada) Jason Ho-Shue (Canada) Nyl Yakura	(India) Tarun Kona (India) Saurabh Sharma
5 March	Brazil International: Host: Foz do Iguacu, Brazil; Venue: Costa Cavalcante; Level: International Challenge; Prize: $25,000; Format: 32MS/32WS/16MD/8WD/16XD	Score: 21–7, retired	
5 March	Brazil International: Host: Foz do Iguacu, Brazil; Venue: Costa Cavalcante; Level: International Challenge; Prize: $25,000; Format: 32MS/32WS/16MD/8WD/16XD	(Canada) Rachel Honderich (United States) Jamie Subandhi	(United States) Jennie Gai (United States) Jamie Hsu
5 March	Brazil International: Host: Foz do Iguacu, Brazil; Venue: Costa Cavalcante; Level: International Challenge; Prize: $25,000; Format: 32MS/32WS/16MD/8WD/16XD	Score: 21–15, 21–10	
5 March	Brazil International: Host: Foz do Iguacu, Brazil; Venue: Costa Cavalcante; Level: International Challenge; Prize: $25,000; Format: 32MS/32WS/16MD/8WD/16XD	(Russia) Evgenij Dremin (Russia) Evgenia Dimova	(India) Saurabh Sharma (India) Anoushka Parikh
5 March	Brazil International: Host: Foz do Iguacu, Brazil; Venue: Costa Cavalcante; Level: International Challenge; Prize: $25,000; Format: 32MS/32WS/16MD/8WD/16XD	Score: 21–17, 21–14	
5 March	Portugal International: Host: Caldas da Rainha, Portugal; Venue: Portuguese High Performance Centre for Badminton; Level: International Series; Prize: $10,000; Format: 32MS/32WS/32MD/32WD/32XD	(Denmark) Rasmus Messerschmidt	(Sweden) Felix Burestedt
5 March	Portugal International: Host: Caldas da Rainha, Portugal; Venue: Portuguese High Performance Centre for Badminton; Level: International Series; Prize: $10,000; Format: 32MS/32WS/32MD/32WD/32XD	Score: 21–18, 21–15	
5 March	Portugal International: Host: Caldas da Rainha, Portugal; Venue: Portuguese High Performance Centre for Badminton; Level: International Series; Prize: $10,000; Format: 32MS/32WS/32MD/32WD/32XD	(China) Qi Xuefei	(Denmark) Anna Thea Madsen
5 March	Portugal International: Host: Caldas da Rainha, Portugal; Venue: Portuguese High Performance Centre for Badminton; Level: International Series; Prize: $10,000; Format: 32MS/32WS/32MD/32WD/32XD	Score: 21–15, 21–17	
5 March	Portugal International: Host: Caldas da Rainha, Portugal; Venue: Portuguese High Performance Centre for Badminton; Level: International Series; Prize: $10,000; Format: 32MS/32WS/32MD/32WD/32XD	(Chinese Taipei) Lu Chen (Chinese Taipei) Ye Hong-wei	(Denmark) Mathias Bay-Smidt (Denmark) Frederik Søgaard Mortensen
5 March	Portugal International: Host: Caldas da Rainha, Portugal; Venue: Portuguese High Performance Centre for Badminton; Level: International Series; Prize: $10,000; Format: 32MS/32WS/32MD/32WD/32XD	Score: 23–21, 21–18	
5 March	Portugal International: Host: Caldas da Rainha, Portugal; Venue: Portuguese High Performance Centre for Badminton; Level: International Series; Prize: $10,000; Format: 32MS/32WS/32MD/32WD/32XD	(Chinese Taipei) Li Zi-qing (Chinese Taipei) Teng Chun-hsun	(Scotland) Julie MacPherson (Scotland) Eleanor O'Donnell
5 March	Portugal International: Host: Caldas da Rainha, Portugal; Venue: Portuguese High Performance Centre for Badminton; Level: International Series; Prize: $10,000; Format: 32MS/32WS/32MD/32WD/32XD	Score: 21–15, 21–13	
5 March	Portugal International: Host: Caldas da Rainha, Portugal; Venue: Portuguese High Performance Centre for Badminton; Level: International Series; Prize: $10,000; Format: 32MS/32WS/32MD/32WD/32XD	(Germany) Peter Käsbauer (Germany) Olga Konon	(Chinese Taipei) Lu Chen (Chinese Taipei) Li Zi-qing
5 March	Portugal International: Host: Caldas da Rainha, Portugal; Venue: Portuguese High Performance Centre for Badminton; Level: International Series; Prize: $10,000; Format: 32MS/32WS/32MD/32WD/32XD	Score: 21–8, 21–12	
12 March	All England Open (Draw): Host: Birmingham, England; Venue: Arena Birmingham; Level: Super 1000; Prize: $1,000,000; Format: 32MS/32WS/32MD/32WD/32XD	(China) Shi Yuqi	(China) Lin Dan
12 March	All England Open (Draw): Host: Birmingham, England; Venue: Arena Birmingham; Level: Super 1000; Prize: $1,000,000; Format: 32MS/32WS/32MD/32WD/32XD	Score: 21–19, 16–21, 21–9	
12 March	All England Open (Draw): Host: Birmingham, England; Venue: Arena Birmingham; Level: Super 1000; Prize: $1,000,000; Format: 32MS/32WS/32MD/32WD/32XD	(Chinese Taipei) Tai Tzu-ying	(Japan) Akane Yamaguchi
12 March	All England Open (Draw): Host: Birmingham, England; Venue: Arena Birmingham; Level: Super 1000; Prize: $1,000,000; Format: 32MS/32WS/32MD/32WD/32XD	Score: 22–20, 21–13	
12 March	All England Open (Draw): Host: Birmingham, England; Venue: Arena Birmingham; Level: Super 1000; Prize: $1,000,000; Format: 32MS/32WS/32MD/32WD/32XD	(Indonesia) Marcus Fernaldi Gideon (Indonesia) Kevin Sanjaya Sukamuljo	(Denmark) Mathias Boe (Denmark) Carsten Mogensen
12 March	All England Open (Draw): Host: Birmingham, England; Venue: Arena Birmingham; Level: Super 1000; Prize: $1,000,000; Format: 32MS/32WS/32MD/32WD/32XD	Score: 21–18, 21–17	
12 March	All England Open (Draw): Host: Birmingham, England; Venue: Arena Birmingham; Level: Super 1000; Prize: $1,000,000; Format: 32MS/32WS/32MD/32WD/32XD	(Denmark) Kamilla Rytter Juhl (Denmark) Christinna Pedersen	(Japan) Yuki Fukushima (Japan) Sayaka Hirota
12 March	All England Open (Draw): Host: Birmingham, England; Venue: Arena Birmingham; Level: Super 1000; Prize: $1,000,000; Format: 32MS/32WS/32MD/32WD/32XD	Score: 21–19, 21–18	
12 March	All England Open (Draw): Host: Birmingham, England; Venue: Arena Birmingham; Level: Super 1000; Prize: $1,000,000; Format: 32MS/32WS/32MD/32WD/32XD	(Japan) Yuta Watanabe (Japan) Arisa Higashino	(China) Zheng Siwei (China) Huang Yaqiong
12 March	All England Open (Draw): Host: Birmingham, England; Venue: Arena Birmingham; Level: Super 1000; Prize: $1,000,000; Format: 32MS/32WS/32MD/32WD/32XD	Score: 15–21, 22–20, 21–16	
12 March	KaBaL International: Host: Karviná, Czech Republic; Venue: STaRS Karvina; Level: International Series; Prize: $10,000; Format: 32MS/32WS/32MD/32WD/32XD	(Denmark) Victor Svendsen	(India) Subhankar Dey
12 March	KaBaL International: Host: Karviná, Czech Republic; Venue: STaRS Karvina; Level: International Series; Prize: $10,000; Format: 32MS/32WS/32MD/32WD/32XD	Score: 21–19, 21–19	
12 March	KaBaL International: Host: Karviná, Czech Republic; Venue: STaRS Karvina; Level: International Series; Prize: $10,000; Format: 32MS/32WS/32MD/32WD/32XD	(Japan) Yuri Nakamura	(Denmark) Amalie Hertz
12 March	KaBaL International: Host: Karviná, Czech Republic; Venue: STaRS Karvina; Level: International Series; Prize: $10,000; Format: 32MS/32WS/32MD/32WD/32XD	Score: 21–8, 21–9	
12 March	KaBaL International: Host: Karviná, Czech Republic; Venue: STaRS Karvina; Level: International Series; Prize: $10,000; Format: 32MS/32WS/32MD/32WD/32XD	(Germany) Bjarne Geiss (Germany) Jan Colin Völker	(Germany) Peter Käsbauer (Germany) Johannes Pistorius
12 March	KaBaL International: Host: Karviná, Czech Republic; Venue: STaRS Karvina; Level: International Series; Prize: $10,000; Format: 32MS/32WS/32MD/32WD/32XD	Score: 21–13, 21–14	
12 March	KaBaL International: Host: Karviná, Czech Republic; Venue: STaRS Karvina; Level: International Series; Prize: $10,000; Format: 32MS/32WS/32MD/32WD/32XD	(Thailand) Supissara Paewsampran (Thailand) Puttita Supajirakul	(Denmark) Elisa Melgaard (Denmark) Sofie Nielsen
12 March	KaBaL International: Host: Karviná, Czech Republic; Venue: STaRS Karvina; Level: International Series; Prize: $10,000; Format: 32MS/32WS/32MD/32WD/32XD	Score: 21–14, 21–11	
12 March	KaBaL International: Host: Karviná, Czech Republic; Venue: STaRS Karvina; Level: International Series; Prize: $10,000; Format: 32MS/32WS/32MD/32WD/32XD	(Germany) Peter Käsbauer (Germany) Olga Konon	(Poland) Paweł Śmiłowski (Poland) Magdalena Świerczyńska
12 March	KaBaL International: Host: Karviná, Czech Republic; Venue: STaRS Karvina; Level: International Series; Prize: $10,000; Format: 32MS/32WS/32MD/32WD/32XD	Score: 21–10, 21–11	
12 March	Giraldilla International: Host: La Habana, Cuba; Venue: Coliseo de la Ciudad Deportiva; Level: Future Series; Prize: $5,000; Format: 32MS/16WS/8MD/8WD/16XD	(Canada) Xiaodong Sheng	(Cuba) Leodannis Martínez
12 March	Giraldilla International: Host: La Habana, Cuba; Venue: Coliseo de la Ciudad Deportiva; Level: Future Series; Prize: $5,000; Format: 32MS/16WS/8MD/8WD/16XD	Score: 21–17, 21–13	
12 March	Giraldilla International: Host: La Habana, Cuba; Venue: Coliseo de la Ciudad Deportiva; Level: Future Series; Prize: $5,000; Format: 32MS/16WS/8MD/8WD/16XD	(United States) Crystal Pan	(Cuba) Taymara Oropesa
12 March	Giraldilla International: Host: La Habana, Cuba; Venue: Coliseo de la Ciudad Deportiva; Level: Future Series; Prize: $5,000; Format: 32MS/16WS/8MD/8WD/16XD	Score: 21–6, 21–13	
12 March	Giraldilla International: Host: La Habana, Cuba; Venue: Coliseo de la Ciudad Deportiva; Level: Future Series; Prize: $5,000; Format: 32MS/16WS/8MD/8WD/16XD	(Cuba) Osleni Guerrero (Cuba) Leodannis Martínez	(Cuba) Lázaro Madera (Cuba) Ernesto Reyes
12 March	Giraldilla International: Host: La Habana, Cuba; Venue: Coliseo de la Ciudad Deportiva; Level: Future Series; Prize: $5,000; Format: 32MS/16WS/8MD/8WD/16XD	Score: 21–10, 21–16	
12 March	Giraldilla International: Host: La Habana, Cuba; Venue: Coliseo de la Ciudad Deportiva; Level: Future Series; Prize: $5,000; Format: 32MS/16WS/8MD/8WD/16XD	(Cuba) Thalía Mengana (Cuba) Taymara Oropesa	(Cuba) Adriana Artiz (Cuba) Yeily Ortiz
12 March	Giraldilla International: Host: La Habana, Cuba; Venue: Coliseo de la Ciudad Deportiva; Level: Future Series; Prize: $5,000; Format: 32MS/16WS/8MD/8WD/16XD	Score: 21–19, 19–21, 21–19	
12 March	Giraldilla International: Host: La Habana, Cuba; Venue: Coliseo de la Ciudad Deportiva; Level: Future Series; Prize: $5,000; Format: 32MS/16WS/8MD/8WD/16XD	(Cuba) Osleni Guerrero (Cuba) Adriana Artiz	(Cuba) Leodannis Martínez (Cuba) Taymara Oropesa
12 March	Giraldilla International: Host: La Habana, Cuba; Venue: Coliseo de la Ciudad Deportiva; Level: Future Series; Prize: $5,000; Format: 32MS/16WS/8MD/8WD/16XD	Score: 21–13, 13–21, 21–19	
19 March	Vietnam International Challenge: Host: Hanoi, Vietnam; Venue: Tay Ho District Stadium; Level: International Challenge; Prize: $25,000; Format: 64MS/32WS/32MD/32WD/32XD	(Japan) Kento Momota	(Malaysia) Goh Giap Chin
19 March	Vietnam International Challenge: Host: Hanoi, Vietnam; Venue: Tay Ho District Stadium; Level: International Challenge; Prize: $25,000; Format: 64MS/32WS/32MD/32WD/32XD	Score: 21–9, 21–15	
19 March	Vietnam International Challenge: Host: Hanoi, Vietnam; Venue: Tay Ho District Stadium; Level: International Challenge; Prize: $25,000; Format: 64MS/32WS/32MD/32WD/32XD	(Indonesia) Dinar Dyah Ayustine	(Japan) Asuka Takahashi
19 March	Vietnam International Challenge: Host: Hanoi, Vietnam; Venue: Tay Ho District Stadium; Level: International Challenge; Prize: $25,000; Format: 64MS/32WS/32MD/32WD/32XD	Score: 13–21, 21–16, 21–14	
19 March	Vietnam International Challenge: Host: Hanoi, Vietnam; Venue: Tay Ho District Stadium; Level: International Challenge; Prize: $25,000; Format: 64MS/32WS/32MD/32WD/32XD	(Thailand) Maneepong Jongjit (Thailand) Nanthakarn Yordphaisong	(Malaysia) Aaron Chia (Malaysia) Soh Wooi Yik
19 March	Vietnam International Challenge: Host: Hanoi, Vietnam; Venue: Tay Ho District Stadium; Level: International Challenge; Prize: $25,000; Format: 64MS/32WS/32MD/32WD/32XD	Score: 21–18, 21–14	
19 March	Vietnam International Challenge: Host: Hanoi, Vietnam; Venue: Tay Ho District Stadium; Level: International Challenge; Prize: $25,000; Format: 64MS/32WS/32MD/32WD/32XD	(South Korea) Baek Ha-na (South Korea) Lee Yu-rim	(Malaysia) Chow Mei Kuan (Malaysia) Vivian Hoo
19 March	Vietnam International Challenge: Host: Hanoi, Vietnam; Venue: Tay Ho District Stadium; Level: International Challenge; Prize: $25,000; Format: 64MS/32WS/32MD/32WD/32XD	Score: 21–19, 17–21, 21–17	
19 March	Vietnam International Challenge: Host: Hanoi, Vietnam; Venue: Tay Ho District Stadium; Level: International Challenge; Prize: $25,000; Format: 64MS/32WS/32MD/32WD/32XD	(Vietnam) Đỗ Tuấn Đức (Vietnam) Phạm Như Thảo	(Russia) Evgenij Dremin (Russia) Evgenia Dimova
19 March	Vietnam International Challenge: Host: Hanoi, Vietnam; Venue: Tay Ho District Stadium; Level: International Challenge; Prize: $25,000; Format: 64MS/32WS/32MD/32WD/32XD	Score: 20–22, 24–22, 21–15	
26 March	Orléans Masters (Draw): Host: Orléans, France; Venue: Palais des Sports; Level: Super 100; Prize: $75,000; Format: 64MS/32WS/32MD/32WD/32XD	(Netherlands) Mark Caljouw	(Denmark) Rasmus Gemke
26 March	Orléans Masters (Draw): Host: Orléans, France; Venue: Palais des Sports; Level: Super 100; Prize: $75,000; Format: 64MS/32WS/32MD/32WD/32XD	Score: 10–21, 21–18, 21–8	
26 March	Orléans Masters (Draw): Host: Orléans, France; Venue: Palais des Sports; Level: Super 100; Prize: $75,000; Format: 64MS/32WS/32MD/32WD/32XD	(Japan) Shiori Saito	(Denmark) Mia Blichfeldt
26 March	Orléans Masters (Draw): Host: Orléans, France; Venue: Palais des Sports; Level: Super 100; Prize: $75,000; Format: 64MS/32WS/32MD/32WD/32XD	Score: 21–18, 21–14	
26 March	Orléans Masters (Draw): Host: Orléans, France; Venue: Palais des Sports; Level: Super 100; Prize: $75,000; Format: 64MS/32WS/32MD/32WD/32XD	(Germany) Mark Lamsfuß (Germany) Marvin Seidel	(Malaysia) Shia Chun Kang (Malaysia) Tan Wee Gieen
26 March	Orléans Masters (Draw): Host: Orléans, France; Venue: Palais des Sports; Level: Super 100; Prize: $75,000; Format: 64MS/32WS/32MD/32WD/32XD	Score: 21–10, 21–18	
26 March	Orléans Masters (Draw): Host: Orléans, France; Venue: Palais des Sports; Level: Super 100; Prize: $75,000; Format: 64MS/32WS/32MD/32WD/32XD	(Bulgaria) Gabriela Stoeva (Bulgaria) Stefani Stoeva	(France) Delphine Delrue (France) Léa Palermo
26 March	Orléans Masters (Draw): Host: Orléans, France; Venue: Palais des Sports; Level: Super 100; Prize: $75,000; Format: 64MS/32WS/32MD/32WD/32XD	Score: 21–8, 21–14	
26 March	Orléans Masters (Draw): Host: Orléans, France; Venue: Palais des Sports; Level: Super 100; Prize: $75,000; Format: 64MS/32WS/32MD/32WD/32XD	(Denmark) Niclas Nøhr (Denmark) Sara Thygesen	(Germany) Peter Käsbauer (Germany) Olga Konon
26 March	Orléans Masters (Draw): Host: Orléans, France; Venue: Palais des Sports; Level: Super 100; Prize: $75,000; Format: 64MS/32WS/32MD/32WD/32XD	Score: 21–19, 21–9	
26 March	Croatian International: Host: Zagreb, Croatia; Venue: Dom Sportova; Level: Future Series; Prize: $500; Format: 32MS/32WS/32MD/16WD/32XD	(Bulgaria) Daniel Nikolov	(Russia) Georgii Karpov
26 March	Croatian International: Host: Zagreb, Croatia; Venue: Dom Sportova; Level: Future Series; Prize: $500; Format: 32MS/32WS/32MD/16WD/32XD	Score: 21–12, 21–12	
26 March	Croatian International: Host: Zagreb, Croatia; Venue: Dom Sportova; Level: Future Series; Prize: $500; Format: 32MS/32WS/32MD/16WD/32XD	(Bulgaria) Mariya Mitsova	(Denmark) Iben Bergstein
26 March	Croatian International: Host: Zagreb, Croatia; Venue: Dom Sportova; Level: Future Series; Prize: $500; Format: 32MS/32WS/32MD/16WD/32XD	Score: 22–20, 22–20	
26 March	Croatian International: Host: Zagreb, Croatia; Venue: Dom Sportova; Level: Future Series; Prize: $500; Format: 32MS/32WS/32MD/16WD/32XD	(Germany) Peter Lang (Germany) Thomas Legleitner	(Austria) Philip Birker (Austria) Dominik Stipsits
26 March	Croatian International: Host: Zagreb, Croatia; Venue: Dom Sportova; Level: Future Series; Prize: $500; Format: 32MS/32WS/32MD/16WD/32XD	Score: 21–14, 21–11	
26 March	Croatian International: Host: Zagreb, Croatia; Venue: Dom Sportova; Level: Future Series; Prize: $500; Format: 32MS/32WS/32MD/16WD/32XD	(Russia) Ksenia Evgenova (Russia) Anastasiia Semenova	(France) Marion le Turdu (France) Melanie Potin
26 March	Croatian International: Host: Zagreb, Croatia; Venue: Dom Sportova; Level: Future Series; Prize: $500; Format: 32MS/32WS/32MD/16WD/32XD	Score: 19–21, 21–11, 21–14	
26 March	Croatian International: Host: Zagreb, Croatia; Venue: Dom Sportova; Level: Future Series; Prize: $500; Format: 32MS/32WS/32MD/16WD/32XD	(Poland) Paweł Pietryja (Poland) Aneta Wojtkowska	(Czech Republic) Jaromír Janáček (Czech Republic) Sabina Milova
26 March	Croatian International: Host: Zagreb, Croatia; Venue: Dom Sportova; Level: Future Series; Prize: $500; Format: 32MS/32WS/32MD/16WD/32XD	Score: 21–10, 21–10	

=== April ===
Week commencing	Tournament	Champions	Runners-up
2 April	Osaka International: Host: Osaka, Japan; Venue: Moriguchi City Gymnasium; Level: International Challenge; Prize: $25,000; Format: 32MS/32WS/32MD/32WD/32XD	(Japan) Yu Igarashi	(Japan) Kodai Naraoka
2 April	Osaka International: Host: Osaka, Japan; Venue: Moriguchi City Gymnasium; Level: International Challenge; Prize: $25,000; Format: 32MS/32WS/32MD/32WD/32XD	Score: 14–21, 21–11, 21–12	
2 April	Osaka International: Host: Osaka, Japan; Venue: Moriguchi City Gymnasium; Level: International Challenge; Prize: $25,000; Format: 32MS/32WS/32MD/32WD/32XD	(Japan) Ayumi Mine	(Japan) Ayaho Sugino
2 April	Osaka International: Host: Osaka, Japan; Venue: Moriguchi City Gymnasium; Level: International Challenge; Prize: $25,000; Format: 32MS/32WS/32MD/32WD/32XD	Score: 21–14, 21–16	
2 April	Osaka International: Host: Osaka, Japan; Venue: Moriguchi City Gymnasium; Level: International Challenge; Prize: $25,000; Format: 32MS/32WS/32MD/32WD/32XD	(Japan) Hirokatsu Hashimoto (Japan) Hiroyuki Saeki	(Malaysia) Mohamad Arif Abdul Latif (Malaysia) Nur Mohd Azriyn Ayub
2 April	Osaka International: Host: Osaka, Japan; Venue: Moriguchi City Gymnasium; Level: International Challenge; Prize: $25,000; Format: 32MS/32WS/32MD/32WD/32XD	Score: 21–19, 15–21, 21–15	
2 April	Osaka International: Host: Osaka, Japan; Venue: Moriguchi City Gymnasium; Level: International Challenge; Prize: $25,000; Format: 32MS/32WS/32MD/32WD/32XD	(Japan) Naoko Fukuman (Japan) Kurumi Yonao	(Japan) Ayako Sakuramoto (Japan) Yukiko Takahata
2 April	Osaka International: Host: Osaka, Japan; Venue: Moriguchi City Gymnasium; Level: International Challenge; Prize: $25,000; Format: 32MS/32WS/32MD/32WD/32XD	Score: 17–21, 21–19, 21–16	
2 April	Osaka International: Host: Osaka, Japan; Venue: Moriguchi City Gymnasium; Level: International Challenge; Prize: $25,000; Format: 32MS/32WS/32MD/32WD/32XD	(South Korea) Kim Won-ho (South Korea) Lee Yu-rim	(Japan) Yunosuke Kubota (Japan) Chiharu Shida
2 April	Osaka International: Host: Osaka, Japan; Venue: Moriguchi City Gymnasium; Level: International Challenge; Prize: $25,000; Format: 32MS/32WS/32MD/32WD/32XD	Score: 21–17, 21–12	
2 April	Finnish Open: Host: Vantaa, Finland; Venue: Energia Areena; Level: International Challenge; Prize: $25,000; Format: 32MS/32WS/32MD/32WD/32XD	(Malaysia) Leong Jun Hao	(Malaysia) Cheam June Wei
2 April	Finnish Open: Host: Vantaa, Finland; Venue: Energia Areena; Level: International Challenge; Prize: $25,000; Format: 32MS/32WS/32MD/32WD/32XD	Score: 12–21, 21–17, 22–20	
2 April	Finnish Open: Host: Vantaa, Finland; Venue: Energia Areena; Level: International Challenge; Prize: $25,000; Format: 32MS/32WS/32MD/32WD/32XD	(Indonesia) Gregoria Mariska Tunjung	(Indonesia) Ruselli Hartawan
2 April	Finnish Open: Host: Vantaa, Finland; Venue: Energia Areena; Level: International Challenge; Prize: $25,000; Format: 32MS/32WS/32MD/32WD/32XD	Score: 21–7, 21–13	
2 April	Finnish Open: Host: Vantaa, Finland; Venue: Energia Areena; Level: International Challenge; Prize: $25,000; Format: 32MS/32WS/32MD/32WD/32XD	(Indonesia) Akbar Bintang Cahyono (Indonesia) Muhammad Reza Pahlevi Isfahani	(Indonesia) Rehan Naufal Kusharjanto (Indonesia) Pramudya Kusumawardana
2 April	Finnish Open: Host: Vantaa, Finland; Venue: Energia Areena; Level: International Challenge; Prize: $25,000; Format: 32MS/32WS/32MD/32WD/32XD	Score: 21–14, 21–17	
2 April	Finnish Open: Host: Vantaa, Finland; Venue: Energia Areena; Level: International Challenge; Prize: $25,000; Format: 32MS/32WS/32MD/32WD/32XD	(Japan) Asumi Kugo (Japan) Megumi Yokoyama	(Malaysia) Goh Yea Ching (Malaysia) Yap Cheng Wen
2 April	Finnish Open: Host: Vantaa, Finland; Venue: Energia Areena; Level: International Challenge; Prize: $25,000; Format: 32MS/32WS/32MD/32WD/32XD	Score: 22–24, 21–15, 21–13	
2 April	Finnish Open: Host: Vantaa, Finland; Venue: Energia Areena; Level: International Challenge; Prize: $25,000; Format: 32MS/32WS/32MD/32WD/32XD	(Indonesia) Alfian Eko Prasetya (Indonesia) Marsheilla Gischa Islami	(Indonesia) Akbar Bintang Cahyono (Indonesia) Winny Oktavina Kandow
2 April	Finnish Open: Host: Vantaa, Finland; Venue: Energia Areena; Level: International Challenge; Prize: $25,000; Format: 32MS/32WS/32MD/32WD/32XD	Score: 21–18, 21–16	
2 April	Argentina International: Host: Buenos Aires, Argentina; Venue: Centro Nacional de alto rendimiento Deportivo (CENARD); Level: Future Series; Prize: TBC; Format: 32MS/16WS/16MD/4WD/16XD	(Brazil) Fabricio Farias	(Italy) Giovanni Toti
2 April	Argentina International: Host: Buenos Aires, Argentina; Venue: Centro Nacional de alto rendimiento Deportivo (CENARD); Level: Future Series; Prize: TBC; Format: 32MS/16WS/16MD/4WD/16XD	Score: 21–19, 21–18	
2 April	Argentina International: Host: Buenos Aires, Argentina; Venue: Centro Nacional de alto rendimiento Deportivo (CENARD); Level: Future Series; Prize: TBC; Format: 32MS/16WS/16MD/4WD/16XD	(Brazil) Jaqueline Lima	(United States) Ruhi Raju
2 April	Argentina International: Host: Buenos Aires, Argentina; Venue: Centro Nacional de alto rendimiento Deportivo (CENARD); Level: Future Series; Prize: TBC; Format: 32MS/16WS/16MD/4WD/16XD	Score: 21–15, 21–18	
2 April	Argentina International: Host: Buenos Aires, Argentina; Venue: Centro Nacional de alto rendimiento Deportivo (CENARD); Level: Future Series; Prize: TBC; Format: 32MS/16WS/16MD/4WD/16XD	(Italy) Enrico Baroni (Italy) Giovanni Toti	(Argentina) Mateo Delmastro (Argentina) Federico Diaz
2 April	Argentina International: Host: Buenos Aires, Argentina; Venue: Centro Nacional de alto rendimiento Deportivo (CENARD); Level: Future Series; Prize: TBC; Format: 32MS/16WS/16MD/4WD/16XD	Score: 22–20, 21–15	
2 April	Argentina International: Host: Buenos Aires, Argentina; Venue: Centro Nacional de alto rendimiento Deportivo (CENARD); Level: Future Series; Prize: TBC; Format: 32MS/16WS/16MD/4WD/16XD	(Argentina) Florencia Bernatene (Argentina) Bárbara María Berruezo	(Argentina) Iona Gualdi (Argentina) Ailen Oliva
2 April	Argentina International: Host: Buenos Aires, Argentina; Venue: Centro Nacional de alto rendimiento Deportivo (CENARD); Level: Future Series; Prize: TBC; Format: 32MS/16WS/16MD/4WD/16XD	Score: 21–13, 21–11	
2 April	Argentina International: Host: Buenos Aires, Argentina; Venue: Centro Nacional de alto rendimiento Deportivo (CENARD); Level: Future Series; Prize: TBC; Format: 32MS/16WS/16MD/4WD/16XD	(Brazil) Fabricio Farias (Brazil) Jaqueline Lima	(United States) Ricky Liuzhou (United States) Angela Zhang
2 April	Argentina International: Host: Buenos Aires, Argentina; Venue: Centro Nacional de alto rendimiento Deportivo (CENARD); Level: Future Series; Prize: TBC; Format: 32MS/16WS/16MD/4WD/16XD	Score: 21–19, 21–15	
2 April	Commonwealth Games Mixed Team (Draw): Host: Gold Coast, Queensland, Australia; Venue: Carrara Sports and Leisure Centre; Level: Multisport; Format: 15 teams	India	Malaysia
2 April	Commonwealth Games Mixed Team (Draw): Host: Gold Coast, Queensland, Australia; Venue: Carrara Sports and Leisure Centre; Level: Multisport; Format: 15 teams	Satwiksairaj Rankireddy / Ashwini Ponnappa; Srikanth Kidambi; Satwiksairaj Rankireddy / Chirag Shetty; Saina Nehwal; N. Sikki Reddy / Ashwini Ponnappa	Chan Peng Soon / Goh Liu Ying; Lee Chong Wei; Goh V Shem / Tan Wee Kiong; Soniia Cheah; Vivian Hoo / Chow Mei Kuan
2 April	Commonwealth Games Mixed Team (Draw): Host: Gold Coast, Queensland, Australia; Venue: Carrara Sports and Leisure Centre; Level: Multisport; Format: 15 teams	Score: 3–1	
9 April	Lingshui China Masters (Draw): Host: Lingshui, China; Venue: Lingshui Agile Stadium; Level: Super 100; Prize: $75,000; Format: 64MS/32WS/32MD/32WD/32XD	(Chinese Taipei) Lin Yu-hsien	(China) Lu Guangzu
9 April	Lingshui China Masters (Draw): Host: Lingshui, China; Venue: Lingshui Agile Stadium; Level: Super 100; Prize: $75,000; Format: 64MS/32WS/32MD/32WD/32XD	Score: 12–21, 21–12, 21–14	
9 April	Lingshui China Masters (Draw): Host: Lingshui, China; Venue: Lingshui Agile Stadium; Level: Super 100; Prize: $75,000; Format: 64MS/32WS/32MD/32WD/32XD	(China) Li Xuerui	(South Korea) Kim Ga-eun
9 April	Lingshui China Masters (Draw): Host: Lingshui, China; Venue: Lingshui Agile Stadium; Level: Super 100; Prize: $75,000; Format: 64MS/32WS/32MD/32WD/32XD	Score: 16–21, 21–16, 21–18	
9 April	Lingshui China Masters (Draw): Host: Lingshui, China; Venue: Lingshui Agile Stadium; Level: Super 100; Prize: $75,000; Format: 64MS/32WS/32MD/32WD/32XD	(China) Han Chengkai (China) Zhou Haodong	(China) Di Zijian (China) Wang Chang
9 April	Lingshui China Masters (Draw): Host: Lingshui, China; Venue: Lingshui Agile Stadium; Level: Super 100; Prize: $75,000; Format: 64MS/32WS/32MD/32WD/32XD	Score: 19–21, 21–17, 21–16	
9 April	Lingshui China Masters (Draw): Host: Lingshui, China; Venue: Lingshui Agile Stadium; Level: Super 100; Prize: $75,000; Format: 64MS/32WS/32MD/32WD/32XD	(China) Du Yue (China) Li Yinhui	(China) Huang Dongping (China) Li Wenmei
9 April	Lingshui China Masters (Draw): Host: Lingshui, China; Venue: Lingshui Agile Stadium; Level: Super 100; Prize: $75,000; Format: 64MS/32WS/32MD/32WD/32XD	Score: 21–16, 21–17	
9 April	Lingshui China Masters (Draw): Host: Lingshui, China; Venue: Lingshui Agile Stadium; Level: Super 100; Prize: $75,000; Format: 64MS/32WS/32MD/32WD/32XD	(China) Guo Xinwa (China) Liu Xuanxuan	(Indonesia) Ronald Alexander (Indonesia) Annisa Saufika
9 April	Lingshui China Masters (Draw): Host: Lingshui, China; Venue: Lingshui Agile Stadium; Level: Super 100; Prize: $75,000; Format: 64MS/32WS/32MD/32WD/32XD	Score: 21–17, 7–21, 21–19	
9 April	Indonesia International: Host: Semarang, Indonesia; Venue: Gelora USM; Level: International Series; Prize: $10,000; Format: 64MS/32WS/32MD/32WD/32XD	(Indonesia) Shesar Hiren Rhustavito	(Indonesia) Sony Dwi Kuncoro
9 April	Indonesia International: Host: Semarang, Indonesia; Venue: Gelora USM; Level: International Series; Prize: $10,000; Format: 64MS/32WS/32MD/32WD/32XD	Score: 21–12, 22–20	
9 April	Indonesia International: Host: Semarang, Indonesia; Venue: Gelora USM; Level: International Series; Prize: $10,000; Format: 64MS/32WS/32MD/32WD/32XD	(Indonesia) Aurum Oktavia Winata	(Thailand) Supanida Katethong
9 April	Indonesia International: Host: Semarang, Indonesia; Venue: Gelora USM; Level: International Series; Prize: $10,000; Format: 64MS/32WS/32MD/32WD/32XD	Score: 21–19, 21–16	
9 April	Indonesia International: Host: Semarang, Indonesia; Venue: Gelora USM; Level: International Series; Prize: $10,000; Format: 64MS/32WS/32MD/32WD/32XD	(Indonesia) Rian Swastedian (Indonesia) Amri Syahnawi	(Indonesia) Irfan Fadhilah (Indonesia) Markis Kido
9 April	Indonesia International: Host: Semarang, Indonesia; Venue: Gelora USM; Level: International Series; Prize: $10,000; Format: 64MS/32WS/32MD/32WD/32XD	Score: 21–19, 21–18	
9 April	Indonesia International: Host: Semarang, Indonesia; Venue: Gelora USM; Level: International Series; Prize: $10,000; Format: 64MS/32WS/32MD/32WD/32XD	(Indonesia) Shella Devi Aulia (Indonesia) Pia Zebadiah Bernadet	(Malaysia) Lim Chiew Sien (Malaysia) Tan Sueh Jeou
9 April	Indonesia International: Host: Semarang, Indonesia; Venue: Gelora USM; Level: International Series; Prize: $10,000; Format: 64MS/32WS/32MD/32WD/32XD	Score: 21–17, 21–12	
9 April	Indonesia International: Host: Semarang, Indonesia; Venue: Gelora USM; Level: International Series; Prize: $10,000; Format: 64MS/32WS/32MD/32WD/32XD	(Indonesia) Amri Syahnawi (Indonesia) Shella Devi Aulia	(Indonesia) Irfan Fadhilah (Indonesia) Pia Zebadiah Bernadet
9 April	Indonesia International: Host: Semarang, Indonesia; Venue: Gelora USM; Level: International Series; Prize: $10,000; Format: 64MS/32WS/32MD/32WD/32XD	Score: 21–17, 21–16	
9 April	Dutch International: Host: Wateringen, Netherlands; Venue: Sportshall Velo; Level: International Series; Prize: $10,000; Format: 32MS/32WS/32MD/32WD/32XD	(Malaysia) Cheam June Wei	(Poland) Adrian Dziółko
9 April	Dutch International: Host: Wateringen, Netherlands; Venue: Sportshall Velo; Level: International Series; Prize: $10,000; Format: 32MS/32WS/32MD/32WD/32XD	Score: 13–21, 21–13, 21–10	
9 April	Dutch International: Host: Wateringen, Netherlands; Venue: Sportshall Velo; Level: International Series; Prize: $10,000; Format: 32MS/32WS/32MD/32WD/32XD	(Denmark) Julie Dawall Jakobsen	(Malaysia) Muralitharan Thinaah
9 April	Dutch International: Host: Wateringen, Netherlands; Venue: Sportshall Velo; Level: International Series; Prize: $10,000; Format: 32MS/32WS/32MD/32WD/32XD	Score: 17–21, 21–15, 21–11	
9 April	Dutch International: Host: Wateringen, Netherlands; Venue: Sportshall Velo; Level: International Series; Prize: $10,000; Format: 32MS/32WS/32MD/32WD/32XD	(India) Arun George (India) Sanyam Shukla	(Russia) Nikita Khakimov (Russia) Andrey Parakhodin
9 April	Dutch International: Host: Wateringen, Netherlands; Venue: Sportshall Velo; Level: International Series; Prize: $10,000; Format: 32MS/32WS/32MD/32WD/32XD	Score: 21–19, 21–19	
9 April	Dutch International: Host: Wateringen, Netherlands; Venue: Sportshall Velo; Level: International Series; Prize: $10,000; Format: 32MS/32WS/32MD/32WD/32XD	(Chinese Taipei) Chang Ya-lan (Chinese Taipei) Cheng Wen-hsing	(Denmark) Amalie Magelund (Denmark) Freja Ravn
9 April	Dutch International: Host: Wateringen, Netherlands; Venue: Sportshall Velo; Level: International Series; Prize: $10,000; Format: 32MS/32WS/32MD/32WD/32XD	Score: 21–18, 27–25	
9 April	Dutch International: Host: Wateringen, Netherlands; Venue: Sportshall Velo; Level: International Series; Prize: $10,000; Format: 32MS/32WS/32MD/32WD/32XD	(France) Thom Gicquel (France) Delphine Delrue	(Denmark) Mathias Thyrri (Denmark) Elisa Melgaard
9 April	Dutch International: Host: Wateringen, Netherlands; Venue: Sportshall Velo; Level: International Series; Prize: $10,000; Format: 32MS/32WS/32MD/32WD/32XD	Score: 21–17, 21–14	
9 April	Commonwealth Games (Draw): Host: Gold Coast, Queensland, Australia; Venue: Carrara Sports and Leisure Centre; Level: Multisport; Format: 48MS/46WS/27MD/28WD/49XD	(Malaysia) Lee Chong Wei	(India) Srikanth Kidambi
9 April	Commonwealth Games (Draw): Host: Gold Coast, Queensland, Australia; Venue: Carrara Sports and Leisure Centre; Level: Multisport; Format: 48MS/46WS/27MD/28WD/49XD	Score: 19–21, 21–14, 21–14	
9 April	Commonwealth Games (Draw): Host: Gold Coast, Queensland, Australia; Venue: Carrara Sports and Leisure Centre; Level: Multisport; Format: 48MS/46WS/27MD/28WD/49XD	(India) Saina Nehwal	(India) P. V. Sindhu
9 April	Commonwealth Games (Draw): Host: Gold Coast, Queensland, Australia; Venue: Carrara Sports and Leisure Centre; Level: Multisport; Format: 48MS/46WS/27MD/28WD/49XD	Score: 21–18, 23–21	
9 April	Commonwealth Games (Draw): Host: Gold Coast, Queensland, Australia; Venue: Carrara Sports and Leisure Centre; Level: Multisport; Format: 48MS/46WS/27MD/28WD/49XD	(England) Marcus Ellis (England) Chris Langridge	(India) Satwiksairaj Rankireddy (India) Chirag Shetty
9 April	Commonwealth Games (Draw): Host: Gold Coast, Queensland, Australia; Venue: Carrara Sports and Leisure Centre; Level: Multisport; Format: 48MS/46WS/27MD/28WD/49XD	Score: 21–13, 21–16	
9 April	Commonwealth Games (Draw): Host: Gold Coast, Queensland, Australia; Venue: Carrara Sports and Leisure Centre; Level: Multisport; Format: 48MS/46WS/27MD/28WD/49XD	(Malaysia) Chow Mei Kuan (Malaysia) Vivian Hoo	(England) Lauren Smith (England) Sarah Walker
9 April	Commonwealth Games (Draw): Host: Gold Coast, Queensland, Australia; Venue: Carrara Sports and Leisure Centre; Level: Multisport; Format: 48MS/46WS/27MD/28WD/49XD	Score: 21–12, 21–12	
9 April	Commonwealth Games (Draw): Host: Gold Coast, Queensland, Australia; Venue: Carrara Sports and Leisure Centre; Level: Multisport; Format: 48MS/46WS/27MD/28WD/49XD	(England) Chris Adcock (England) Gabby Adcock	(England) Marcus Ellis (England) Lauren Smith
9 April	Commonwealth Games (Draw): Host: Gold Coast, Queensland, Australia; Venue: Carrara Sports and Leisure Centre; Level: Multisport; Format: 48MS/46WS/27MD/28WD/49XD	Score: 19–21, 21–17, 21–16	
16 April	Malaysia International: Host: Kuala Lumpur, Malaysia; Venue: Juara Stadium; Level: International Challenge; Prize: $25,000; Format: 64MS/32WS/32MD/32WD/32XD	(Chinese Taipei) Hsueh Hsuan-yi	(Malaysia) Tan Jia Wei
16 April	Malaysia International: Host: Kuala Lumpur, Malaysia; Venue: Juara Stadium; Level: International Challenge; Prize: $25,000; Format: 64MS/32WS/32MD/32WD/32XD	Score: 21–18, 21–19	
16 April	Malaysia International: Host: Kuala Lumpur, Malaysia; Venue: Juara Stadium; Level: International Challenge; Prize: $25,000; Format: 64MS/32WS/32MD/32WD/32XD	(China) Wang Zhiyi	(Malaysia) Lee Ying Ying
16 April	Malaysia International: Host: Kuala Lumpur, Malaysia; Venue: Juara Stadium; Level: International Challenge; Prize: $25,000; Format: 64MS/32WS/32MD/32WD/32XD	Score: 21–10, 22–24, 21–14	
16 April	Malaysia International: Host: Kuala Lumpur, Malaysia; Venue: Juara Stadium; Level: International Challenge; Prize: $25,000; Format: 64MS/32WS/32MD/32WD/32XD	(Indonesia) Mohammad Ahsan (Indonesia) Hendra Setiawan	(Malaysia) Aaron Chia (Malaysia) Soh Wooi Yik
16 April	Malaysia International: Host: Kuala Lumpur, Malaysia; Venue: Juara Stadium; Level: International Challenge; Prize: $25,000; Format: 64MS/32WS/32MD/32WD/32XD	Score: 21–17, 17–21, 21–19	
16 April	Malaysia International: Host: Kuala Lumpur, Malaysia; Venue: Juara Stadium; Level: International Challenge; Prize: $25,000; Format: 64MS/32WS/32MD/32WD/32XD	(Malaysia) Soong Fie Cho (Malaysia) Tee Jing Yi	(Malaysia) Lim Chiew Sien (Malaysia) Tan Sueh Jeou
16 April	Malaysia International: Host: Kuala Lumpur, Malaysia; Venue: Juara Stadium; Level: International Challenge; Prize: $25,000; Format: 64MS/32WS/32MD/32WD/32XD	Score: 21–13, 21–10	
16 April	Malaysia International: Host: Kuala Lumpur, Malaysia; Venue: Juara Stadium; Level: International Challenge; Prize: $25,000; Format: 64MS/32WS/32MD/32WD/32XD	(Malaysia) Chen Tang Jie (Malaysia) Peck Yen Wei	(Indonesia) Andika Ramadiansyah (Indonesia) Mychelle Crhystine Bandaso
16 April	Malaysia International: Host: Kuala Lumpur, Malaysia; Venue: Juara Stadium; Level: International Challenge; Prize: $25,000; Format: 64MS/32WS/32MD/32WD/32XD	Score: 12–21, 23–21, 21–13	
16 April	Hellas International: Host: Sidirokastro, Greece; Venue: Sidirokastro Indoor Hall; Level: Future Series; Prize: TBC; Format: 32MS/32WS/32MD/32WD/32XD	(France) Toma Junior Popov	(Czech Republic) Ondřej Král
16 April	Hellas International: Host: Sidirokastro, Greece; Venue: Sidirokastro Indoor Hall; Level: Future Series; Prize: TBC; Format: 32MS/32WS/32MD/32WD/32XD	Score: 21–7, 21–13	
16 April	Hellas International: Host: Sidirokastro, Greece; Venue: Sidirokastro Indoor Hall; Level: Future Series; Prize: TBC; Format: 32MS/32WS/32MD/32WD/32XD	(Thailand) Porntip Buranaprasertsuk	(Turkey) Cemre Fere
16 April	Hellas International: Host: Sidirokastro, Greece; Venue: Sidirokastro Indoor Hall; Level: Future Series; Prize: TBC; Format: 32MS/32WS/32MD/32WD/32XD	Score: 21–13, 21–9	
16 April	Hellas International: Host: Sidirokastro, Greece; Venue: Sidirokastro Indoor Hall; Level: Future Series; Prize: TBC; Format: 32MS/32WS/32MD/32WD/32XD	(Bulgaria) Daniel Nikolov (Bulgaria) Ivan Rusev	(England) David Jones (England) Johnnie Torjussen
16 April	Hellas International: Host: Sidirokastro, Greece; Venue: Sidirokastro Indoor Hall; Level: Future Series; Prize: TBC; Format: 32MS/32WS/32MD/32WD/32XD	Score: 21–16, 21–19	
16 April	Hellas International: Host: Sidirokastro, Greece; Venue: Sidirokastro Indoor Hall; Level: Future Series; Prize: TBC; Format: 32MS/32WS/32MD/32WD/32XD	(Thailand) Porntip Buranaprasertsuk (Belarus) Kristina Silich	(England) Abigail Holden (England) Fee Teng Liew
16 April	Hellas International: Host: Sidirokastro, Greece; Venue: Sidirokastro Indoor Hall; Level: Future Series; Prize: TBC; Format: 32MS/32WS/32MD/32WD/32XD	Score: 21–9, 21–19	
16 April	Hellas International: Host: Sidirokastro, Greece; Venue: Sidirokastro Indoor Hall; Level: Future Series; Prize: TBC; Format: 32MS/32WS/32MD/32WD/32XD	(Bulgaria) Dimitar Yanakiev (Bulgaria) Mariya Mitsova	(England) Michael Roe (England) Jessica Hopton
16 April	Hellas International: Host: Sidirokastro, Greece; Venue: Sidirokastro Indoor Hall; Level: Future Series; Prize: TBC; Format: 32MS/32WS/32MD/32WD/32XD	Score: 24–22, 21–14	
23 April	Badminton Asia Championships (Draw): Host: Wuhan, China; Venue: Wuhan Sports Center Gymnasium; Level: Continental Championships; Prize: $350,000; Format: 32MS/32WS/32MD/32WD/32XD	(Japan) Kento Momota	(China) Chen Long
23 April	Badminton Asia Championships (Draw): Host: Wuhan, China; Venue: Wuhan Sports Center Gymnasium; Level: Continental Championships; Prize: $350,000; Format: 32MS/32WS/32MD/32WD/32XD	Score: 21–17, 21–13	
23 April	Badminton Asia Championships (Draw): Host: Wuhan, China; Venue: Wuhan Sports Center Gymnasium; Level: Continental Championships; Prize: $350,000; Format: 32MS/32WS/32MD/32WD/32XD	(Chinese Taipei) Tai Tzu-ying	(China) Chen Yufei
23 April	Badminton Asia Championships (Draw): Host: Wuhan, China; Venue: Wuhan Sports Center Gymnasium; Level: Continental Championships; Prize: $350,000; Format: 32MS/32WS/32MD/32WD/32XD	Score: 21–19, 22–20	
23 April	Badminton Asia Championships (Draw): Host: Wuhan, China; Venue: Wuhan Sports Center Gymnasium; Level: Continental Championships; Prize: $350,000; Format: 32MS/32WS/32MD/32WD/32XD	(China) Li Junhui (China) Liu Yuchen	(Japan) Takeshi Kamura (Japan) Keigo Sonoda
23 April	Badminton Asia Championships (Draw): Host: Wuhan, China; Venue: Wuhan Sports Center Gymnasium; Level: Continental Championships; Prize: $350,000; Format: 32MS/32WS/32MD/32WD/32XD	Score: 11–21, 21–10, 21–13	
23 April	Badminton Asia Championships (Draw): Host: Wuhan, China; Venue: Wuhan Sports Center Gymnasium; Level: Continental Championships; Prize: $350,000; Format: 32MS/32WS/32MD/32WD/32XD	(Japan) Yuki Fukushima (Japan) Sayaka Hirota	(Japan) Misaki Matsutomo (Japan) Ayaka Takahashi
23 April	Badminton Asia Championships (Draw): Host: Wuhan, China; Venue: Wuhan Sports Center Gymnasium; Level: Continental Championships; Prize: $350,000; Format: 32MS/32WS/32MD/32WD/32XD	Score: 21–18, 18–21, 21–15	
23 April	Badminton Asia Championships (Draw): Host: Wuhan, China; Venue: Wuhan Sports Center Gymnasium; Level: Continental Championships; Prize: $350,000; Format: 32MS/32WS/32MD/32WD/32XD	(China) Wang Yilyu (China) Huang Dongping	(Indonesia) Tontowi Ahmad (Indonesia) Liliyana Natsir
23 April	Badminton Asia Championships (Draw): Host: Wuhan, China; Venue: Wuhan Sports Center Gymnasium; Level: Continental Championships; Prize: $350,000; Format: 32MS/32WS/32MD/32WD/32XD	Score: 21–17, 21–17	
23 April	European Badminton Championships (Draw): Host: Huelva, Spain; Venue: Palacio de Deportes de Huelva; Level: Continental Championships; Prize: TBC; Format: 64MS/64WS/32MD/32WD/32XD	(Denmark) Viktor Axelsen	(England) Rajiv Ouseph
23 April	European Badminton Championships (Draw): Host: Huelva, Spain; Venue: Palacio de Deportes de Huelva; Level: Continental Championships; Prize: TBC; Format: 64MS/64WS/32MD/32WD/32XD	Score: 21–8, 21–7	
23 April	European Badminton Championships (Draw): Host: Huelva, Spain; Venue: Palacio de Deportes de Huelva; Level: Continental Championships; Prize: TBC; Format: 64MS/64WS/32MD/32WD/32XD	(Spain) Carolina Marín	(Russia) Evgeniya Kosetskaya
23 April	European Badminton Championships (Draw): Host: Huelva, Spain; Venue: Palacio de Deportes de Huelva; Level: Continental Championships; Prize: TBC; Format: 64MS/64WS/32MD/32WD/32XD	Score: 21–15, 21–7	
23 April	European Badminton Championships (Draw): Host: Huelva, Spain; Venue: Palacio de Deportes de Huelva; Level: Continental Championships; Prize: TBC; Format: 64MS/64WS/32MD/32WD/32XD	(Denmark) Kim Astrup (Denmark) Anders Skaarup Rasmussen	(Denmark) Mads Conrad-Petersen (Denmark) Mads Pieler Kolding
23 April	European Badminton Championships (Draw): Host: Huelva, Spain; Venue: Palacio de Deportes de Huelva; Level: Continental Championships; Prize: TBC; Format: 64MS/64WS/32MD/32WD/32XD	Score: 21–15, Retired	
23 April	European Badminton Championships (Draw): Host: Huelva, Spain; Venue: Palacio de Deportes de Huelva; Level: Continental Championships; Prize: TBC; Format: 64MS/64WS/32MD/32WD/32XD	(Bulgaria) Gabriela Stoeva (Bulgaria) Stefani Stoeva	(France) Émilie Lefel (France) Anne Tran
23 April	European Badminton Championships (Draw): Host: Huelva, Spain; Venue: Palacio de Deportes de Huelva; Level: Continental Championships; Prize: TBC; Format: 64MS/64WS/32MD/32WD/32XD	Score: 21–12, 21–10	
23 April	European Badminton Championships (Draw): Host: Huelva, Spain; Venue: Palacio de Deportes de Huelva; Level: Continental Championships; Prize: TBC; Format: 64MS/64WS/32MD/32WD/32XD	(England) Chris Adcock (England) Gabby Adcock	(Denmark) Mathias Christiansen (Denmark) Christinna Pedersen
23 April	European Badminton Championships (Draw): Host: Huelva, Spain; Venue: Palacio de Deportes de Huelva; Level: Continental Championships; Prize: TBC; Format: 64MS/64WS/32MD/32WD/32XD	Score: 21–18, 17–21, 21–18	
23 April	Pan Am Badminton Championships (Draw): Host: Guatemala City, Guatemala; Venue: Teodoro Palacios Flores Gymnasium; Level: Continental Championships; Prize: TBC; Format: 64MS/64WS/32MD/32WD/64XD	(Brazil) Ygor Coelho	(Canada) Jason Ho-Shue
23 April	Pan Am Badminton Championships (Draw): Host: Guatemala City, Guatemala; Venue: Teodoro Palacios Flores Gymnasium; Level: Continental Championships; Prize: TBC; Format: 64MS/64WS/32MD/32WD/64XD	Score: 21–12, 21–15	
23 April	Pan Am Badminton Championships (Draw): Host: Guatemala City, Guatemala; Venue: Teodoro Palacios Flores Gymnasium; Level: Continental Championships; Prize: TBC; Format: 64MS/64WS/32MD/32WD/64XD	(Canada) Michelle Li	(Canada) Rachel Honderich
23 April	Pan Am Badminton Championships (Draw): Host: Guatemala City, Guatemala; Venue: Teodoro Palacios Flores Gymnasium; Level: Continental Championships; Prize: TBC; Format: 64MS/64WS/32MD/32WD/64XD	Score: 21–15, 21–16	
23 April	Pan Am Badminton Championships (Draw): Host: Guatemala City, Guatemala; Venue: Teodoro Palacios Flores Gymnasium; Level: Continental Championships; Prize: TBC; Format: 64MS/64WS/32MD/32WD/64XD	(Canada) Jason Ho-Shue (Canada) Nyl Yakura	(United States) Phillip Chew (United States) Ryan Chew
23 April	Pan Am Badminton Championships (Draw): Host: Guatemala City, Guatemala; Venue: Teodoro Palacios Flores Gymnasium; Level: Continental Championships; Prize: TBC; Format: 64MS/64WS/32MD/32WD/64XD	Score: 21–17, 21–17	
23 April	Pan Am Badminton Championships (Draw): Host: Guatemala City, Guatemala; Venue: Teodoro Palacios Flores Gymnasium; Level: Continental Championships; Prize: TBC; Format: 64MS/64WS/32MD/32WD/64XD	(Canada) Rachel Honderich (Canada) Kristen Tsai	(Canada) Michelle Tong (Canada) Josephine Wu
23 April	Pan Am Badminton Championships (Draw): Host: Guatemala City, Guatemala; Venue: Teodoro Palacios Flores Gymnasium; Level: Continental Championships; Prize: TBC; Format: 64MS/64WS/32MD/32WD/64XD	Score: 17–21, 21–17, 21–14	
23 April	Pan Am Badminton Championships (Draw): Host: Guatemala City, Guatemala; Venue: Teodoro Palacios Flores Gymnasium; Level: Continental Championships; Prize: TBC; Format: 64MS/64WS/32MD/32WD/64XD	(Canada) Ty Alexander Lindeman (Canada) Josephine Wu	(Canada) Nyl Yakura (Canada) Kristen Tsai
23 April	Pan Am Badminton Championships (Draw): Host: Guatemala City, Guatemala; Venue: Teodoro Palacios Flores Gymnasium; Level: Continental Championships; Prize: TBC; Format: 64MS/64WS/32MD/32WD/64XD	Score: 21–14, 26–24	
30 April	New Zealand Open (Draw): Host: Auckland, New Zealand; Venue: North Shore Events Centre; Level: Super 300; Prize: $150,000; Format: 32MS/32WS/32MD/32WD/32XD	(China) Lin Dan	(Indonesia) Jonatan Christie
30 April	New Zealand Open (Draw): Host: Auckland, New Zealand; Venue: North Shore Events Centre; Level: Super 300; Prize: $150,000; Format: 32MS/32WS/32MD/32WD/32XD	Score: 21–14, 21–19	
30 April	New Zealand Open (Draw): Host: Auckland, New Zealand; Venue: North Shore Events Centre; Level: Super 300; Prize: $150,000; Format: 32MS/32WS/32MD/32WD/32XD	(Japan) Sayaka Takahashi	(China) Zhang Yiman
30 April	New Zealand Open (Draw): Host: Auckland, New Zealand; Venue: North Shore Events Centre; Level: Super 300; Prize: $150,000; Format: 32MS/32WS/32MD/32WD/32XD	Score: 21–13, 21–14	
30 April	New Zealand Open (Draw): Host: Auckland, New Zealand; Venue: North Shore Events Centre; Level: Super 300; Prize: $150,000; Format: 32MS/32WS/32MD/32WD/32XD	(Chinese Taipei) Chen Hung-ling (Chinese Taipei) Wang Chi-lin	(Indonesia) Berry Angriawan (Indonesia) Hardianto
30 April	New Zealand Open (Draw): Host: Auckland, New Zealand; Venue: North Shore Events Centre; Level: Super 300; Prize: $150,000; Format: 32MS/32WS/32MD/32WD/32XD	Score: 21–17, 21–17	
30 April	New Zealand Open (Draw): Host: Auckland, New Zealand; Venue: North Shore Events Centre; Level: Super 300; Prize: $150,000; Format: 32MS/32WS/32MD/32WD/32XD	(Japan) Ayako Sakuramoto (Japan) Yukiko Takahata	(China) Cao Tongwei (China) Zheng Yu
30 April	New Zealand Open (Draw): Host: Auckland, New Zealand; Venue: North Shore Events Centre; Level: Super 300; Prize: $150,000; Format: 32MS/32WS/32MD/32WD/32XD	Score: 21–9, 21–19	
30 April	New Zealand Open (Draw): Host: Auckland, New Zealand; Venue: North Shore Events Centre; Level: Super 300; Prize: $150,000; Format: 32MS/32WS/32MD/32WD/32XD	(Chinese Taipei) Wang Chi-lin (Chinese Taipei) Lee Chia-hsin	(South Korea) Seo Seung-jae (South Korea) Chae Yoo-jung
30 April	New Zealand Open (Draw): Host: Auckland, New Zealand; Venue: North Shore Events Centre; Level: Super 300; Prize: $150,000; Format: 32MS/32WS/32MD/32WD/32XD	Score: 21–19, 14–21, 21–19	

=== May ===
Week commencing	Tournament	Champions	Runners-up
7 May	Australian Open (Draw): Host: Sydney, Australia; Venue: Quaycentre; Level: Super 300; Prize: $150,000; Format: 32MS/32WS/32MD/32WD/32XD	(China) Lu Guangzu	(China) Zhou Zeqi
7 May	Australian Open (Draw): Host: Sydney, Australia; Venue: Quaycentre; Level: Super 300; Prize: $150,000; Format: 32MS/32WS/32MD/32WD/32XD	Score: 21–8, 23–21	
7 May	Australian Open (Draw): Host: Sydney, Australia; Venue: Quaycentre; Level: Super 300; Prize: $150,000; Format: 32MS/32WS/32MD/32WD/32XD	(China) Cai Yanyan	(Japan) Ayumi Mine
7 May	Australian Open (Draw): Host: Sydney, Australia; Venue: Quaycentre; Level: Super 300; Prize: $150,000; Format: 32MS/32WS/32MD/32WD/32XD	Score: 21–14, 21–13	
7 May	Australian Open (Draw): Host: Sydney, Australia; Venue: Quaycentre; Level: Super 300; Prize: $150,000; Format: 32MS/32WS/32MD/32WD/32XD	(Indonesia) Berry Angriawan (Indonesia) Hardianto	(Indonesia) Wahyu Nayaka (Indonesia) Ade Yusuf
7 May	Australian Open (Draw): Host: Sydney, Australia; Venue: Quaycentre; Level: Super 300; Prize: $150,000; Format: 32MS/32WS/32MD/32WD/32XD	Score: 21–9, 9–21, 21–15	
7 May	Australian Open (Draw): Host: Sydney, Australia; Venue: Quaycentre; Level: Super 300; Prize: $150,000; Format: 32MS/32WS/32MD/32WD/32XD	(Japan) Ayako Sakuramoto (Japan) Yukiko Takahata	(South Korea) Baek Ha-na (South Korea) Lee Yu-rim
7 May	Australian Open (Draw): Host: Sydney, Australia; Venue: Quaycentre; Level: Super 300; Prize: $150,000; Format: 32MS/32WS/32MD/32WD/32XD	Score: 23–21, 21–18	
7 May	Australian Open (Draw): Host: Sydney, Australia; Venue: Quaycentre; Level: Super 300; Prize: $150,000; Format: 32MS/32WS/32MD/32WD/32XD	(South Korea) Seo Seung-jae (South Korea) Chae Yoo-jung	(Malaysia) Chan Peng Soon (Malaysia) Goh Liu Ying
7 May	Australian Open (Draw): Host: Sydney, Australia; Venue: Quaycentre; Level: Super 300; Prize: $150,000; Format: 32MS/32WS/32MD/32WD/32XD	Score: 21–12, 23–21	
7 May	Slovenia International: Host: Medvode, Slovenia; Venue: Medvode Sports Hall; Level: International Series; Prize: $10,000; Format: 32MS/32WS/32MD/32WD/32XD	(England) Toby Penty	(Spain) Pablo Abián
7 May	Slovenia International: Host: Medvode, Slovenia; Venue: Medvode Sports Hall; Level: International Series; Prize: $10,000; Format: 32MS/32WS/32MD/32WD/32XD	Score: 21–18, 21–18	
7 May	Slovenia International: Host: Medvode, Slovenia; Venue: Medvode Sports Hall; Level: International Series; Prize: $10,000; Format: 32MS/32WS/32MD/32WD/32XD	(China) Qi Xuefei	(Denmark) Michelle Skødstrup
7 May	Slovenia International: Host: Medvode, Slovenia; Venue: Medvode Sports Hall; Level: International Series; Prize: $10,000; Format: 32MS/32WS/32MD/32WD/32XD	Score: 21–15, 21–6	
7 May	Slovenia International: Host: Medvode, Slovenia; Venue: Medvode Sports Hall; Level: International Series; Prize: $10,000; Format: 32MS/32WS/32MD/32WD/32XD	(Denmark) Jeppe Bay (Denmark) Rasmus Kjær	(Denmark) Mads Emil Christensen (Denmark) Kristoffer Knudsen
7 May	Slovenia International: Host: Medvode, Slovenia; Venue: Medvode Sports Hall; Level: International Series; Prize: $10,000; Format: 32MS/32WS/32MD/32WD/32XD	Score: 21–14, 21–19	
7 May	Slovenia International: Host: Medvode, Slovenia; Venue: Medvode Sports Hall; Level: International Series; Prize: $10,000; Format: 32MS/32WS/32MD/32WD/32XD	(Turkey) Bengisu Ercetin (Turkey) Nazlıcan İnci	(Germany) Eva Janssens (Germany) Stine Susan Küspert
7 May	Slovenia International: Host: Medvode, Slovenia; Venue: Medvode Sports Hall; Level: International Series; Prize: $10,000; Format: 32MS/32WS/32MD/32WD/32XD	Score: 23–21, 21–19	
7 May	Slovenia International: Host: Medvode, Slovenia; Venue: Medvode Sports Hall; Level: International Series; Prize: $10,000; Format: 32MS/32WS/32MD/32WD/32XD	(England) Gregory Mairs (England) Jenny Moore	(Denmark) Kristoffer Knudsen (Denmark) Isabella Nielsen
7 May	Slovenia International: Host: Medvode, Slovenia; Venue: Medvode Sports Hall; Level: International Series; Prize: $10,000; Format: 32MS/32WS/32MD/32WD/32XD	Score: 13–21, 21–16, 21–14	
14 May	Peru Future Series: Host: Lima, Peru; Venue: Polideportivo 2 Villa Deportiva Nacional; Level: Future Series; Prize: $2,750; Format: 32MS/32WS/16MD/16WD/16XD	(Mexico) Luis Ramón Garrido	(Mexico) Arturo Hernández
14 May	Peru Future Series: Host: Lima, Peru; Venue: Polideportivo 2 Villa Deportiva Nacional; Level: Future Series; Prize: $2,750; Format: 32MS/32WS/16MD/16WD/16XD	Score: 21–9, 21–8	
14 May	Peru Future Series: Host: Lima, Peru; Venue: Polideportivo 2 Villa Deportiva Nacional; Level: Future Series; Prize: $2,750; Format: 32MS/32WS/16MD/16WD/16XD	(Peru) Daniela Macías	(Brazil) Fabiana Silva
14 May	Peru Future Series: Host: Lima, Peru; Venue: Polideportivo 2 Villa Deportiva Nacional; Level: Future Series; Prize: $2,750; Format: 32MS/32WS/16MD/16WD/16XD	Score: 21–14, 16–21, 21–17	
14 May	Peru Future Series: Host: Lima, Peru; Venue: Polideportivo 2 Villa Deportiva Nacional; Level: Future Series; Prize: $2,750; Format: 32MS/32WS/16MD/16WD/16XD	(Peru) Jose Guevara (Peru) Daniel la Torre	(Peru) Bruno Barrueto (Peru) Diego Subauste
14 May	Peru Future Series: Host: Lima, Peru; Venue: Polideportivo 2 Villa Deportiva Nacional; Level: Future Series; Prize: $2,750; Format: 32MS/32WS/16MD/16WD/16XD	Score: 21–18, 21–13	
14 May	Peru Future Series: Host: Lima, Peru; Venue: Polideportivo 2 Villa Deportiva Nacional; Level: Future Series; Prize: $2,750; Format: 32MS/32WS/16MD/16WD/16XD	(Peru) Daniela Macías (Peru) Dánica Nishimura	(Peru) Ines Castillo (Peru) Paula la Torre
14 May	Peru Future Series: Host: Lima, Peru; Venue: Polideportivo 2 Villa Deportiva Nacional; Level: Future Series; Prize: $2,750; Format: 32MS/32WS/16MD/16WD/16XD	Score: 21–16, 21–10	
14 May	Peru Future Series: Host: Lima, Peru; Venue: Polideportivo 2 Villa Deportiva Nacional; Level: Future Series; Prize: $2,750; Format: 32MS/32WS/16MD/16WD/16XD	(Peru) Daniel la Torre (Peru) Dánica Nishimura	(Peru) Diego Mini (Peru) Paula la Torre
14 May	Peru Future Series: Host: Lima, Peru; Venue: Polideportivo 2 Villa Deportiva Nacional; Level: Future Series; Prize: $2,750; Format: 32MS/32WS/16MD/16WD/16XD	Score: 21–18, 15–21, 21–10	
21 May	Thomas & Uber Cup (Draw): Host: Bangkok, Thailand; Venue: IMPACT Arena; Level: World Team Championships; Prize: TBC; Format: 16MT/16WT	China	Japan
21 May	Thomas & Uber Cup (Draw): Host: Bangkok, Thailand; Venue: IMPACT Arena; Level: World Team Championships; Prize: TBC; Format: 16MT/16WT	Chen Long; Liu Cheng / Zhang Nan; Shi Yuqi; Li Junhui / Liu Yuchen; Lin Dan	Kento Momota; Takuto Inoue / Yuki Kaneko; Kenta Nishimoto; Keigo Sonoda / Yuta Watanabe; Kanta Tsuneyama
21 May	Thomas & Uber Cup (Draw): Host: Bangkok, Thailand; Venue: IMPACT Arena; Level: World Team Championships; Prize: TBC; Format: 16MT/16WT	Score: 3–1	
21 May	Thomas & Uber Cup (Draw): Host: Bangkok, Thailand; Venue: IMPACT Arena; Level: World Team Championships; Prize: TBC; Format: 16MT/16WT	Japan	Thailand
21 May	Thomas & Uber Cup (Draw): Host: Bangkok, Thailand; Venue: IMPACT Arena; Level: World Team Championships; Prize: TBC; Format: 16MT/16WT	Akane Yamaguchi; Yuki Fukushima / Sayaka Hirota; Nozomi Okuhara; Misaki Matsutomo / Ayaka Takahashi; Sayaka Takahashi	Ratchanok Intanon; Jongkolphan Kititharakul / Puttita Supajirakul; Nitchaon Jindapol; Rawinda Prajongjai / Sapsiree Taerattanachai; Busanan Ongbamrungphan
21 May	Thomas & Uber Cup (Draw): Host: Bangkok, Thailand; Venue: IMPACT Arena; Level: World Team Championships; Prize: TBC; Format: 16MT/16WT	Score: 3–0	
28 May	Latvia International: Host: Jelgava, Latvia; Venue: Jelgava City Sports Hall; Level: Future Series; Prize: TBC; Format: 32MS/32WS/32MD/32WD/32XD	(France) Toma Junior Popov	(France) Léo Rossi
28 May	Latvia International: Host: Jelgava, Latvia; Venue: Jelgava City Sports Hall; Level: Future Series; Prize: TBC; Format: 32MS/32WS/32MD/32WD/32XD	Score: 21–10, 21–15	
28 May	Latvia International: Host: Jelgava, Latvia; Venue: Jelgava City Sports Hall; Level: Future Series; Prize: TBC; Format: 32MS/32WS/32MD/32WD/32XD	(Estonia) Kristin Kuuba	(Belarus) Alesia Zaitsava
28 May	Latvia International: Host: Jelgava, Latvia; Venue: Jelgava City Sports Hall; Level: Future Series; Prize: TBC; Format: 32MS/32WS/32MD/32WD/32XD	Score: 21–10, 21–16	
28 May	Latvia International: Host: Jelgava, Latvia; Venue: Jelgava City Sports Hall; Level: Future Series; Prize: TBC; Format: 32MS/32WS/32MD/32WD/32XD	(France) Fabien Delrue (France) William Villeger	(Denmark) Emil Lauritzen (Denmark) Mads Muurholm
28 May	Latvia International: Host: Jelgava, Latvia; Venue: Jelgava City Sports Hall; Level: Future Series; Prize: TBC; Format: 32MS/32WS/32MD/32WD/32XD	Score: 21–12, 21–17	
28 May	Latvia International: Host: Jelgava, Latvia; Venue: Jelgava City Sports Hall; Level: Future Series; Prize: TBC; Format: 32MS/32WS/32MD/32WD/32XD	(Estonia) Kristin Kuuba (Estonia) Helina Rüütel	(France) Ainoa Desmons (France) Juliette Moinard
28 May	Latvia International: Host: Jelgava, Latvia; Venue: Jelgava City Sports Hall; Level: Future Series; Prize: TBC; Format: 32MS/32WS/32MD/32WD/32XD	Score: 21–17, 21–16	
28 May	Latvia International: Host: Jelgava, Latvia; Venue: Jelgava City Sports Hall; Level: Future Series; Prize: TBC; Format: 32MS/32WS/32MD/32WD/32XD	(Poland) Paweł Śmiłowski (Poland) Magdalena Świerczyńska	(Denmark) Emil Lauritzen (Denmark) Iben Bergstein
28 May	Latvia International: Host: Jelgava, Latvia; Venue: Jelgava City Sports Hall; Level: Future Series; Prize: TBC; Format: 32MS/32WS/32MD/32WD/32XD	Score: 21–17, 25–23	

=== June ===
Week commencing	Tournament	Champions	Runners-up
4 June	Lithuanian International: Host: Kaunas, Lithuania; Venue: Kaunas Sports Hall; Level: Future Series; Prize: TBC; Format: 32MS/32WS/32MD/32WD/32XD	(Sweden) Felix Burestedt	(Poland) Michał Rogalski
4 June	Lithuanian International: Host: Kaunas, Lithuania; Venue: Kaunas Sports Hall; Level: Future Series; Prize: TBC; Format: 32MS/32WS/32MD/32WD/32XD	Score: 21–12, 23–21	
4 June	Lithuanian International: Host: Kaunas, Lithuania; Venue: Kaunas Sports Hall; Level: Future Series; Prize: TBC; Format: 32MS/32WS/32MD/32WD/32XD	(Estonia) Kristin Kuuba	(Wales) Jordan Hart
4 June	Lithuanian International: Host: Kaunas, Lithuania; Venue: Kaunas Sports Hall; Level: Future Series; Prize: TBC; Format: 32MS/32WS/32MD/32WD/32XD	Score: 21–23, 21–18, 21–18	
4 June	Lithuanian International: Host: Kaunas, Lithuania; Venue: Kaunas Sports Hall; Level: Future Series; Prize: TBC; Format: 32MS/32WS/32MD/32WD/32XD	(Czech Republic) Jaromír Janáček (Czech Republic) Tomáš Švejda	(Russia) Egor Kurdyukov (Russia) Egor Okolov
4 June	Lithuanian International: Host: Kaunas, Lithuania; Venue: Kaunas Sports Hall; Level: Future Series; Prize: TBC; Format: 32MS/32WS/32MD/32WD/32XD	Score: 18–21, 21–15, 21–15	
4 June	Lithuanian International: Host: Kaunas, Lithuania; Venue: Kaunas Sports Hall; Level: Future Series; Prize: TBC; Format: 32MS/32WS/32MD/32WD/32XD	(Estonia) Kristin Kuuba (Estonia) Helina Rüütel	(Denmark) Christine Busch (Denmark) Amalie Schulz
4 June	Lithuanian International: Host: Kaunas, Lithuania; Venue: Kaunas Sports Hall; Level: Future Series; Prize: TBC; Format: 32MS/32WS/32MD/32WD/32XD	Score: 22–20, 21–9	
4 June	Lithuanian International: Host: Kaunas, Lithuania; Venue: Kaunas Sports Hall; Level: Future Series; Prize: TBC; Format: 32MS/32WS/32MD/32WD/32XD	(England) Callum Hemming (England) Fee Teng Liew	(Poland) Paweł Śmiłowski (Poland) Magdalena Świerczyńska
4 June	Lithuanian International: Host: Kaunas, Lithuania; Venue: Kaunas Sports Hall; Level: Future Series; Prize: TBC; Format: 32MS/32WS/32MD/32WD/32XD	Score: 17–21, 21–14, 21–18	
4 June	Mauritius International: Host: Rose Hill, Mauritius; Venue: National Badminton Centre; Level: Future Series; Prize: TBC; Format: 32MS/32WS/32MD/8WD/16XD	(Malaysia) Goh Giap Chin	(Myanmar) Aung Myo Htoo
4 June	Mauritius International: Host: Rose Hill, Mauritius; Venue: National Badminton Centre; Level: Future Series; Prize: TBC; Format: 32MS/32WS/32MD/8WD/16XD	Score: 21–15, 21–12	
4 June	Mauritius International: Host: Rose Hill, Mauritius; Venue: National Badminton Centre; Level: Future Series; Prize: TBC; Format: 32MS/32WS/32MD/8WD/16XD	(Malaysia) Letshanaa Karupathevan	(Czech Republic) Kateřina Tomalová
4 June	Mauritius International: Host: Rose Hill, Mauritius; Venue: National Badminton Centre; Level: Future Series; Prize: TBC; Format: 32MS/32WS/32MD/8WD/16XD	Score: 21–15, 21–10	
4 June	Mauritius International: Host: Rose Hill, Mauritius; Venue: National Badminton Centre; Level: Future Series; Prize: TBC; Format: 32MS/32WS/32MD/8WD/16XD	(Austria) Daniel Graßmück (Austria) Roman Zirnwald	(Malaysia) Ng Yong Chai (Malaysia) Tee Kai Wun
4 June	Mauritius International: Host: Rose Hill, Mauritius; Venue: National Badminton Centre; Level: Future Series; Prize: TBC; Format: 32MS/32WS/32MD/8WD/16XD	Score: 21–16, 12–21, 21–14	
4 June	Mauritius International: Host: Rose Hill, Mauritius; Venue: National Badminton Centre; Level: Future Series; Prize: TBC; Format: 32MS/32WS/32MD/8WD/16XD	(India) Simran Singhi (India) Ritika Thaker	(Maldives) Aminath Nabeeha Abdul Razzaq (Maldives) Fathimath Nabaaha Abdul Razzaq
4 June	Mauritius International: Host: Rose Hill, Mauritius; Venue: National Badminton Centre; Level: Future Series; Prize: TBC; Format: 32MS/32WS/32MD/8WD/16XD	Score: 21–17, 21–12	
4 June	Mauritius International: Host: Rose Hill, Mauritius; Venue: National Badminton Centre; Level: Future Series; Prize: TBC; Format: 32MS/32WS/32MD/8WD/16XD	(Mauritius) Julien Paul (Mauritius) Aurélie Allet	(Maldives) Sarim Mohamed (Maldives) Moosa Aminath Shahurunaz
4 June	Mauritius International: Host: Rose Hill, Mauritius; Venue: National Badminton Centre; Level: Future Series; Prize: TBC; Format: 32MS/32WS/32MD/8WD/16XD	Score: 21–14, 21–6	
11 June	U.S. Open (Draw): Host: Fullerton, California, United States; Venue: Titan Gym; Level: Super 300; Prize: $150,000; Format: 32MS/32WS/32MD/32WD/32XD	(South Korea) Lee Dong-keun	(Netherlands) Mark Caljouw
11 June	U.S. Open (Draw): Host: Fullerton, California, United States; Venue: Titan Gym; Level: Super 300; Prize: $150,000; Format: 32MS/32WS/32MD/32WD/32XD	Score: 14–21, 21–17, 21–16	
11 June	U.S. Open (Draw): Host: Fullerton, California, United States; Venue: Titan Gym; Level: Super 300; Prize: $150,000; Format: 32MS/32WS/32MD/32WD/32XD	(China) Li Xuerui	(United States) Beiwen Zhang
11 June	U.S. Open (Draw): Host: Fullerton, California, United States; Venue: Titan Gym; Level: Super 300; Prize: $150,000; Format: 32MS/32WS/32MD/32WD/32XD	Score: 24–26, 21–15, 21–11	
11 June	U.S. Open (Draw): Host: Fullerton, California, United States; Venue: Titan Gym; Level: Super 300; Prize: $150,000; Format: 32MS/32WS/32MD/32WD/32XD	(China) Ou Xuanyi (China) Ren Xiangyu	(South Korea) Kang Min-hyuk (South Korea) Kim Won-ho
11 June	U.S. Open (Draw): Host: Fullerton, California, United States; Venue: Titan Gym; Level: Super 300; Prize: $150,000; Format: 32MS/32WS/32MD/32WD/32XD	Score: 16–21, 21–16, 21–17	
11 June	U.S. Open (Draw): Host: Fullerton, California, United States; Venue: Titan Gym; Level: Super 300; Prize: $150,000; Format: 32MS/32WS/32MD/32WD/32XD	(China) Tang Jinhua (China) Yu Xiaohan	(South Korea) Kim Hye-jeong (South Korea) Kim So-yeong
11 June	U.S. Open (Draw): Host: Fullerton, California, United States; Venue: Titan Gym; Level: Super 300; Prize: $150,000; Format: 32MS/32WS/32MD/32WD/32XD	Score: 18–21, 21–13, 21–15	
11 June	U.S. Open (Draw): Host: Fullerton, California, United States; Venue: Titan Gym; Level: Super 300; Prize: $150,000; Format: 32MS/32WS/32MD/32WD/32XD	(Malaysia) Chan Peng Soon (Malaysia) Goh Liu Ying	(Germany) Marvin Seidel (Germany) Linda Efler
11 June	U.S. Open (Draw): Host: Fullerton, California, United States; Venue: Titan Gym; Level: Super 300; Prize: $150,000; Format: 32MS/32WS/32MD/32WD/32XD	Score: 21–19, 21–15	
11 June	Spanish International: Host: Madrid, Spain; Venue: Polideportivo Municipal; Level: International Challenge; Prize: $25,000; Format: 32MS/32WS/32MD/32WD/32XD	(France) Toma Junior Popov	(France) Lucas Corvée
11 June	Spanish International: Host: Madrid, Spain; Venue: Polideportivo Municipal; Level: International Challenge; Prize: $25,000; Format: 32MS/32WS/32MD/32WD/32XD	Score: 21–13, 21–17	
11 June	Spanish International: Host: Madrid, Spain; Venue: Polideportivo Municipal; Level: International Challenge; Prize: $25,000; Format: 32MS/32WS/32MD/32WD/32XD	(Denmark) Michelle Skødstrup	(Thailand) Supanida Katethong
11 June	Spanish International: Host: Madrid, Spain; Venue: Polideportivo Municipal; Level: International Challenge; Prize: $25,000; Format: 32MS/32WS/32MD/32WD/32XD	Score: 21–11, 21–15	
11 June	Spanish International: Host: Madrid, Spain; Venue: Polideportivo Municipal; Level: International Challenge; Prize: $25,000; Format: 32MS/32WS/32MD/32WD/32XD	(Denmark) Frederik Colberg (Denmark) Joachim Fischer Nielsen	(Thailand) Bodin Isara (Thailand) Maneepong Jongjit
11 June	Spanish International: Host: Madrid, Spain; Venue: Polideportivo Municipal; Level: International Challenge; Prize: $25,000; Format: 32MS/32WS/32MD/32WD/32XD	Score: 21–23, 21–19, 21–15	
11 June	Spanish International: Host: Madrid, Spain; Venue: Polideportivo Municipal; Level: International Challenge; Prize: $25,000; Format: 32MS/32WS/32MD/32WD/32XD	(France) Delphine Delrue (France) Léa Palermo	(Ukraine) Maryna Ilyinskaya (Ukraine) Yelyzaveta Zharka
11 June	Spanish International: Host: Madrid, Spain; Venue: Polideportivo Municipal; Level: International Challenge; Prize: $25,000; Format: 32MS/32WS/32MD/32WD/32XD	Score: 21–6, 21–12	
11 June	Spanish International: Host: Madrid, Spain; Venue: Polideportivo Municipal; Level: International Challenge; Prize: $25,000; Format: 32MS/32WS/32MD/32WD/32XD	(Russia) Evgenij Dremin (Russia) Evgenia Dimova	(Denmark) Mikkel Mikkelsen (Denmark) Mai Surrow
11 June	Spanish International: Host: Madrid, Spain; Venue: Polideportivo Municipal; Level: International Challenge; Prize: $25,000; Format: 32MS/32WS/32MD/32WD/32XD	Score: 24–22, 21–12	
11 June	Cameroon International: Host: Yaoundé, Cameroon; Venue: Yaoundé Multipurpose Sports Complex; Level: International Series; Prize: $10,000; Format: 32MS/16WS/16MD/4WD/8XD	(Mexico) Luis Ramón Garrido	(Czech Republic) Adam Mendrek
11 June	Cameroon International: Host: Yaoundé, Cameroon; Venue: Yaoundé Multipurpose Sports Complex; Level: International Series; Prize: $10,000; Format: 32MS/16WS/16MD/4WD/8XD	Score: 21–19, 21–9	
11 June	Cameroon International: Host: Yaoundé, Cameroon; Venue: Yaoundé Multipurpose Sports Complex; Level: International Series; Prize: $10,000; Format: 32MS/16WS/16MD/4WD/8XD	(Egypt) Hadia Hosny	(Egypt) Doha Hany
11 June	Cameroon International: Host: Yaoundé, Cameroon; Venue: Yaoundé Multipurpose Sports Complex; Level: International Series; Prize: $10,000; Format: 32MS/16WS/16MD/4WD/8XD	Score: 21–17, 15–21, 21–16	
11 June	Cameroon International: Host: Yaoundé, Cameroon; Venue: Yaoundé Multipurpose Sports Complex; Level: International Series; Prize: $10,000; Format: 32MS/16WS/16MD/4WD/8XD	(Denmark) Mathias Pedersen (Germany) Jonathan Persson	(India) Shouvik Ghosh (India) Ratikanta Saha
11 June	Cameroon International: Host: Yaoundé, Cameroon; Venue: Yaoundé Multipurpose Sports Complex; Level: International Series; Prize: $10,000; Format: 32MS/16WS/16MD/4WD/8XD	Score: 21–15, 21–17	
11 June	Cameroon International: Host: Yaoundé, Cameroon; Venue: Yaoundé Multipurpose Sports Complex; Level: International Series; Prize: $10,000; Format: 32MS/16WS/16MD/4WD/8XD	(Egypt) Doha Hany (Egypt) Hadia Hosny	(Cameroon) Louise Lisane Mbas (Cameroon) Stella Joel Ngadjui
11 June	Cameroon International: Host: Yaoundé, Cameroon; Venue: Yaoundé Multipurpose Sports Complex; Level: International Series; Prize: $10,000; Format: 32MS/16WS/16MD/4WD/8XD	Score: 21–7, 21–9	
11 June	Cameroon International: Host: Yaoundé, Cameroon; Venue: Yaoundé Multipurpose Sports Complex; Level: International Series; Prize: $10,000; Format: 32MS/16WS/16MD/4WD/8XD	(Egypt) Adham Hatem Elgamal (Egypt) Doha Hany	(Egypt) Ahmed Salah (Egypt) Hadia Hosny
11 June	Cameroon International: Host: Yaoundé, Cameroon; Venue: Yaoundé Multipurpose Sports Complex; Level: International Series; Prize: $10,000; Format: 32MS/16WS/16MD/4WD/8XD	Score: 13–21, 21–15, 21–15	
18 June	Canada Open (Draw): Host: Calgary, Canada; Venue: Canadian Winter Sport Institute; Level: Super 100; Prize: $75,000; Format: 64MS/32WS/32MD/32WD/32XD	(China) Lu Guangzu	(Japan) Minoru Koga
18 June	Canada Open (Draw): Host: Calgary, Canada; Venue: Canadian Winter Sport Institute; Level: Super 100; Prize: $75,000; Format: 64MS/32WS/32MD/32WD/32XD	Score: 21–15, 21–10	
18 June	Canada Open (Draw): Host: Calgary, Canada; Venue: Canadian Winter Sport Institute; Level: Super 100; Prize: $75,000; Format: 64MS/32WS/32MD/32WD/32XD	(China) Li Xuerui	(Japan) Sayaka Takahashi
18 June	Canada Open (Draw): Host: Calgary, Canada; Venue: Canadian Winter Sport Institute; Level: Super 100; Prize: $75,000; Format: 64MS/32WS/32MD/32WD/32XD	Score: 22–20, 15–21, 21–17	
18 June	Canada Open (Draw): Host: Calgary, Canada; Venue: Canadian Winter Sport Institute; Level: Super 100; Prize: $75,000; Format: 64MS/32WS/32MD/32WD/32XD	(England) Marcus Ellis (England) Chris Langridge	(Germany) Mark Lamsfuß (Germany) Marvin Seidel
18 June	Canada Open (Draw): Host: Calgary, Canada; Venue: Canadian Winter Sport Institute; Level: Super 100; Prize: $75,000; Format: 64MS/32WS/32MD/32WD/32XD	Score: 19–21, 21–18, 22–20	
18 June	Canada Open (Draw): Host: Calgary, Canada; Venue: Canadian Winter Sport Institute; Level: Super 100; Prize: $75,000; Format: 64MS/32WS/32MD/32WD/32XD	(Japan) Ayako Sakuramoto (Japan) Yukiko Takahata	(Germany) Isabel Herttrich (Germany) Carla Nelte
18 June	Canada Open (Draw): Host: Calgary, Canada; Venue: Canadian Winter Sport Institute; Level: Super 100; Prize: $75,000; Format: 64MS/32WS/32MD/32WD/32XD	Score: 21–13, 21–15	
18 June	Canada Open (Draw): Host: Calgary, Canada; Venue: Canadian Winter Sport Institute; Level: Super 100; Prize: $75,000; Format: 64MS/32WS/32MD/32WD/32XD	(England) Marcus Ellis (England) Lauren Smith	(Germany) Mark Lamsfuß (Germany) Isabel Herttrich
18 June	Canada Open (Draw): Host: Calgary, Canada; Venue: Canadian Winter Sport Institute; Level: Super 100; Prize: $75,000; Format: 64MS/32WS/32MD/32WD/32XD	Score: 21–13, 21–4	
18 June	Côte d'Ivoire International: Host: Abidjan, Côte d'Ivoire; Venue: Palais des Sports de Treichville; Level: International Series; Prize: $10,000; Format: 32MS/16WS/16MD/4WD/16XD	(Mexico) Luis Ramón Garrido	(Czech Republic) Adam Mendrek
18 June	Côte d'Ivoire International: Host: Abidjan, Côte d'Ivoire; Venue: Palais des Sports de Treichville; Level: International Series; Prize: $10,000; Format: 32MS/16WS/16MD/4WD/16XD	Score: 21–15, 21–9	
18 June	Côte d'Ivoire International: Host: Abidjan, Côte d'Ivoire; Venue: Palais des Sports de Treichville; Level: International Series; Prize: $10,000; Format: 32MS/16WS/16MD/4WD/16XD	(Nigeria) Dorcas Ajoke Adesokan	(Nigeria) Chineue Ibere
18 June	Côte d'Ivoire International: Host: Abidjan, Côte d'Ivoire; Venue: Palais des Sports de Treichville; Level: International Series; Prize: $10,000; Format: 32MS/16WS/16MD/4WD/16XD	Score: 21–10, 21–12	
18 June	Côte d'Ivoire International: Host: Abidjan, Côte d'Ivoire; Venue: Palais des Sports de Treichville; Level: International Series; Prize: $10,000; Format: 32MS/16WS/16MD/4WD/16XD	(Nigeria) Godwin Olofua (Nigeria) Anuoluwapo Juwon Opeyori	(Denmark) Mathias Pedersen (Germany) Jonathan Persson
18 June	Côte d'Ivoire International: Host: Abidjan, Côte d'Ivoire; Venue: Palais des Sports de Treichville; Level: International Series; Prize: $10,000; Format: 32MS/16WS/16MD/4WD/16XD	Score: 21–14, 21–19	
18 June	Côte d'Ivoire International: Host: Abidjan, Côte d'Ivoire; Venue: Palais des Sports de Treichville; Level: International Series; Prize: $10,000; Format: 32MS/16WS/16MD/4WD/16XD	(Zambia) Evelyn Siamupangila (Zambia) Ogar Siamupangila	(Ivory Coast) Nogona Celine Bakayoko (Ivory Coast) Aïcha Laurene N'Dia
18 June	Côte d'Ivoire International: Host: Abidjan, Côte d'Ivoire; Venue: Palais des Sports de Treichville; Level: International Series; Prize: $10,000; Format: 32MS/16WS/16MD/4WD/16XD	Score: 21–7, 21–7	
18 June	Côte d'Ivoire International: Host: Abidjan, Côte d'Ivoire; Venue: Palais des Sports de Treichville; Level: International Series; Prize: $10,000; Format: 32MS/16WS/16MD/4WD/16XD	(Nigeria) Clement Krobakpo (Nigeria) Dorcas Ajoke Adesokan	(Zambia) Kalombo Mulenga (Zambia) Ogar Siamupangila
18 June	Côte d'Ivoire International: Host: Abidjan, Côte d'Ivoire; Venue: Palais des Sports de Treichville; Level: International Series; Prize: $10,000; Format: 32MS/16WS/16MD/4WD/16XD	Score: 21–9, 21–15	
18 June	Mediterranean Games (Draw): Host: El Morell, Tarragona, Catalonia, Spain; Venue: El Morell Pavilion; Level: Multisport; Format: 20MS/20WS/9MD/10WD	(Spain) Pablo Abián	(France) Lucas Corvée
18 June	Mediterranean Games (Draw): Host: El Morell, Tarragona, Catalonia, Spain; Venue: El Morell Pavilion; Level: Multisport; Format: 20MS/20WS/9MD/10WD	Score: 21–23, 21–15, 21–17	
18 June	Mediterranean Games (Draw): Host: El Morell, Tarragona, Catalonia, Spain; Venue: El Morell Pavilion; Level: Multisport; Format: 20MS/20WS/9MD/10WD	(Turkey) Neslihan Yiğit	(Spain) Beatriz Corrales
18 June	Mediterranean Games (Draw): Host: El Morell, Tarragona, Catalonia, Spain; Venue: El Morell Pavilion; Level: Multisport; Format: 20MS/20WS/9MD/10WD	Score: 21–19, 23–21	
18 June	Mediterranean Games (Draw): Host: El Morell, Tarragona, Catalonia, Spain; Venue: El Morell Pavilion; Level: Multisport; Format: 20MS/20WS/9MD/10WD	(France) Bastian Kersaudy (France) Thom Gicquel	(Turkey) Serdar Koca (Turkey) Serhat Salim
18 June	Mediterranean Games (Draw): Host: El Morell, Tarragona, Catalonia, Spain; Venue: El Morell Pavilion; Level: Multisport; Format: 20MS/20WS/9MD/10WD	Score: 21–9, 21–19	
18 June	Mediterranean Games (Draw): Host: El Morell, Tarragona, Catalonia, Spain; Venue: El Morell Pavilion; Level: Multisport; Format: 20MS/20WS/9MD/10WD	(France) Delphine Delrue (France) Léa Palermo	(Turkey) Bengisu Erçetin (Turkey) Nazlıcan İnci
18 June	Mediterranean Games (Draw): Host: El Morell, Tarragona, Catalonia, Spain; Venue: El Morell Pavilion; Level: Multisport; Format: 20MS/20WS/9MD/10WD	Score: 21–17, 21–16	
25 June	Malaysia Open (Draw): Host: Kuala Lumpur, Malaysia; Venue: Axiata Arena; Level: Super 750; Prize: $700,000; Format: 32MS/32WS/32MD/32WD/32XD	(Malaysia) Lee Chong Wei	(Japan) Kento Momota
25 June	Malaysia Open (Draw): Host: Kuala Lumpur, Malaysia; Venue: Axiata Arena; Level: Super 750; Prize: $700,000; Format: 32MS/32WS/32MD/32WD/32XD	Score: 21–17, 23–21	
25 June	Malaysia Open (Draw): Host: Kuala Lumpur, Malaysia; Venue: Axiata Arena; Level: Super 750; Prize: $700,000; Format: 32MS/32WS/32MD/32WD/32XD	(Chinese Taipei) Tai Tzu-ying	(China) He Bingjiao
25 June	Malaysia Open (Draw): Host: Kuala Lumpur, Malaysia; Venue: Axiata Arena; Level: Super 750; Prize: $700,000; Format: 32MS/32WS/32MD/32WD/32XD	Score: 22–20, 21–11	
25 June	Malaysia Open (Draw): Host: Kuala Lumpur, Malaysia; Venue: Axiata Arena; Level: Super 750; Prize: $700,000; Format: 32MS/32WS/32MD/32WD/32XD	(Japan) Takeshi Kamura (Japan) Keigo Sonoda	(Japan) Hiroyuki Endo (Japan) Yuta Watanabe
25 June	Malaysia Open (Draw): Host: Kuala Lumpur, Malaysia; Venue: Axiata Arena; Level: Super 750; Prize: $700,000; Format: 32MS/32WS/32MD/32WD/32XD	Score: 21–8, 21–10	
25 June	Malaysia Open (Draw): Host: Kuala Lumpur, Malaysia; Venue: Axiata Arena; Level: Super 750; Prize: $700,000; Format: 32MS/32WS/32MD/32WD/32XD	(Japan) Misaki Matsutomo (Japan) Ayaka Takahashi	(China) Chen Qingchen (China) Jia Yifan
25 June	Malaysia Open (Draw): Host: Kuala Lumpur, Malaysia; Venue: Axiata Arena; Level: Super 750; Prize: $700,000; Format: 32MS/32WS/32MD/32WD/32XD	Score: 21–12, 21–12	
25 June	Malaysia Open (Draw): Host: Kuala Lumpur, Malaysia; Venue: Axiata Arena; Level: Super 750; Prize: $700,000; Format: 32MS/32WS/32MD/32WD/32XD	(China) Zheng Siwei (China) Huang Yaqiong	(China) Wang Yilyu (China) Huang Dongping
25 June	Malaysia Open (Draw): Host: Kuala Lumpur, Malaysia; Venue: Axiata Arena; Level: Super 750; Prize: $700,000; Format: 32MS/32WS/32MD/32WD/32XD	Score: 21–19, 21–18	
25 June	Peru International: Host: Lima, Peru; Venue: Villa Deportiva Nacional; Level: International Series; Prize: $10,000; Format: 32MS/32WS/32MD/16WD/32XD	(Guatemala) Kevin Cordón	(Cuba) Osleni Guerrero
25 June	Peru International: Host: Lima, Peru; Venue: Villa Deportiva Nacional; Level: International Series; Prize: $10,000; Format: 32MS/32WS/32MD/16WD/32XD	Score: 22–20, 14–21, 21–15	
25 June	Peru International: Host: Lima, Peru; Venue: Villa Deportiva Nacional; Level: International Series; Prize: $10,000; Format: 32MS/32WS/32MD/16WD/32XD	(United States) Crystal Pan	(Cuba) Taymara Oropesa
25 June	Peru International: Host: Lima, Peru; Venue: Villa Deportiva Nacional; Level: International Series; Prize: $10,000; Format: 32MS/32WS/32MD/16WD/32XD	Score: 21–12, 21–16	
25 June	Peru International: Host: Lima, Peru; Venue: Villa Deportiva Nacional; Level: International Series; Prize: $10,000; Format: 32MS/32WS/32MD/16WD/32XD	(United States) Enrico Asuncion (Philippines) Carlo Glenn Remo	(Mexico) Job Castillo (Mexico) Lino Muñoz
25 June	Peru International: Host: Lima, Peru; Venue: Villa Deportiva Nacional; Level: International Series; Prize: $10,000; Format: 32MS/32WS/32MD/16WD/32XD	Score: 19–21, 21–14, 21–18	
25 June	Peru International: Host: Lima, Peru; Venue: Villa Deportiva Nacional; Level: International Series; Prize: $10,000; Format: 32MS/32WS/32MD/16WD/32XD	(Peru) Daniela Macías (Peru) Dánica Nishimura	(Peru) Inés Castillo (Peru) Paula la Torre Regal
25 June	Peru International: Host: Lima, Peru; Venue: Villa Deportiva Nacional; Level: International Series; Prize: $10,000; Format: 32MS/32WS/32MD/16WD/32XD	Score: 21–11, 21–10	
25 June	Peru International: Host: Lima, Peru; Venue: Villa Deportiva Nacional; Level: International Series; Prize: $10,000; Format: 32MS/32WS/32MD/16WD/32XD	(Brazil) Artur Silva Pomoceno (Brazil) Fabiana Silva	(Cuba) Leodannis Martínez (Cuba) Taymara Oropesa
25 June	Peru International: Host: Lima, Peru; Venue: Villa Deportiva Nacional; Level: International Series; Prize: $10,000; Format: 32MS/32WS/32MD/16WD/32XD	Score: 26–24, 15–21, 21–8	
25 June	Mongolia International: Host: Ulaanbaatar, Mongolia; Venue: Aldar Sport Horoo; Level: International Series; Prize: $10,000; Format: 32MS/32WS/16MD/8WD/16XD	(Singapore) Loh Kean Yew	(Indonesia) Andre Marteen
25 June	Mongolia International: Host: Ulaanbaatar, Mongolia; Venue: Aldar Sport Horoo; Level: International Series; Prize: $10,000; Format: 32MS/32WS/16MD/8WD/16XD	Score: 15–21, 21–9, 24–22	
25 June	Mongolia International: Host: Ulaanbaatar, Mongolia; Venue: Aldar Sport Horoo; Level: International Series; Prize: $10,000; Format: 32MS/32WS/16MD/8WD/16XD	(Hong Kong) Joy Xuan Deng	(Thailand) Chasinee Korepap
25 June	Mongolia International: Host: Ulaanbaatar, Mongolia; Venue: Aldar Sport Horoo; Level: International Series; Prize: $10,000; Format: 32MS/32WS/16MD/8WD/16XD	Score: 21–11, 21–8	
25 June	Mongolia International: Host: Ulaanbaatar, Mongolia; Venue: Aldar Sport Horoo; Level: International Series; Prize: $10,000; Format: 32MS/32WS/16MD/8WD/16XD	(Singapore) Lee Jian Liang (Singapore) Jason Wong Guang Liang	(Singapore) Danny Bawa Chrisnanta (Singapore) Bimo Adi Prakoso
25 June	Mongolia International: Host: Ulaanbaatar, Mongolia; Venue: Aldar Sport Horoo; Level: International Series; Prize: $10,000; Format: 32MS/32WS/16MD/8WD/16XD	Score: 20–22, 23–21, 21–18	
25 June	Mongolia International: Host: Ulaanbaatar, Mongolia; Venue: Aldar Sport Horoo; Level: International Series; Prize: $10,000; Format: 32MS/32WS/16MD/8WD/16XD	(Singapore) Citra Putri Sari Dewi (Singapore) Jin Yujia	(Macau) Gong Xue Xin (Macau) Ng Weng Chi
25 June	Mongolia International: Host: Ulaanbaatar, Mongolia; Venue: Aldar Sport Horoo; Level: International Series; Prize: $10,000; Format: 32MS/32WS/16MD/8WD/16XD	Score: 21–16, 21–9	
25 June	Mongolia International: Host: Ulaanbaatar, Mongolia; Venue: Aldar Sport Horoo; Level: International Series; Prize: $10,000; Format: 32MS/32WS/16MD/8WD/16XD	(Singapore) Bimo Adi Prakoso (Singapore) Jin Yujia	(Singapore) Danny Bawa Chrisnanta (Singapore) Crystal Wong
25 June	Mongolia International: Host: Ulaanbaatar, Mongolia; Venue: Aldar Sport Horoo; Level: International Series; Prize: $10,000; Format: 32MS/32WS/16MD/8WD/16XD	Score: 21–11, 22–20	
25 June	Benin International: Host: Cotonou, Benin; Venue: Palais des Sports Stade de l'Amitié; Level: Future Series; Prize: TBD; Format: 32MS/16WS/16MD/4WD/16XD	(Belgium) Maxime Moreels	(Jordan) Bahaedeen Ahmad Alshannik
25 June	Benin International: Host: Cotonou, Benin; Venue: Palais des Sports Stade de l'Amitié; Level: Future Series; Prize: TBD; Format: 32MS/16WS/16MD/4WD/16XD	Score: 21–11, 21–13	
25 June	Benin International: Host: Cotonou, Benin; Venue: Palais des Sports Stade de l'Amitié; Level: Future Series; Prize: TBD; Format: 32MS/16WS/16MD/4WD/16XD	(Benin) Pascaline Ludoskine Yeno Vitou	(Benin) Xena Arisa
25 June	Benin International: Host: Cotonou, Benin; Venue: Palais des Sports Stade de l'Amitié; Level: Future Series; Prize: TBD; Format: 32MS/16WS/16MD/4WD/16XD	Score: 21–9, 20–22, 21–13	
25 June	Benin International: Host: Cotonou, Benin; Venue: Palais des Sports Stade de l'Amitié; Level: Future Series; Prize: TBD; Format: 32MS/16WS/16MD/4WD/16XD	(Benin) Gbenoukpo Sebastiano Dégbe (Benin) Tobiloba Oyewolé	(Benin) Carlos Charles Ahouangassi (Benin) Oswald Ash Fano-Dosh
25 June	Benin International: Host: Cotonou, Benin; Venue: Palais des Sports Stade de l'Amitié; Level: Future Series; Prize: TBD; Format: 32MS/16WS/16MD/4WD/16XD	Score: 21–12, 21–16	
25 June	Benin International: Host: Cotonou, Benin; Venue: Palais des Sports Stade de l'Amitié; Level: Future Series; Prize: TBD; Format: 32MS/16WS/16MD/4WD/16XD	(Benin) Xena Arisa (Benin) Adjele Joeline Degbey	(Benin) Pernelle Fabossou (Benin) Pascaline Ludoskine Yeno Vitou
25 June	Benin International: Host: Cotonou, Benin; Venue: Palais des Sports Stade de l'Amitié; Level: Future Series; Prize: TBD; Format: 32MS/16WS/16MD/4WD/16XD	Score: 21–18, 23–21	
25 June	Benin International: Host: Cotonou, Benin; Venue: Palais des Sports Stade de l'Amitié; Level: Future Series; Prize: TBD; Format: 32MS/16WS/16MD/4WD/16XD	(Benin) Tobiloba Oyewolé (Benin) Xena Arisa	(Benin) Gbenoukpo Sebastiano Dégbe (Benin) Pascaline Ludoskine Yeno Vitou
25 June	Benin International: Host: Cotonou, Benin; Venue: Palais des Sports Stade de l'Amitié; Level: Future Series; Prize: TBD; Format: 32MS/16WS/16MD/4WD/16XD	Score: 21–5, 21–15	

=== July ===
Week commencing	Tournament	Champions	Runners-up
2 July	Indonesia Open (Draw): Host: Jakarta, Indonesia; Venue: Istora Gelora Bung Karno; Level: Super 1000; Prize: $1,250,000; Format: 32MS/32WS/32MD/32WD/32XD	(Japan) Kento Momota	(Denmark) Viktor Axelsen
2 July	Indonesia Open (Draw): Host: Jakarta, Indonesia; Venue: Istora Gelora Bung Karno; Level: Super 1000; Prize: $1,250,000; Format: 32MS/32WS/32MD/32WD/32XD	Score: 21–14, 21–9	
2 July	Indonesia Open (Draw): Host: Jakarta, Indonesia; Venue: Istora Gelora Bung Karno; Level: Super 1000; Prize: $1,250,000; Format: 32MS/32WS/32MD/32WD/32XD	(Chinese Taipei) Tai Tzu-ying	(China) Chen Yufei
2 July	Indonesia Open (Draw): Host: Jakarta, Indonesia; Venue: Istora Gelora Bung Karno; Level: Super 1000; Prize: $1,250,000; Format: 32MS/32WS/32MD/32WD/32XD	Score: 21–23, 21–15, 21–9	
2 July	Indonesia Open (Draw): Host: Jakarta, Indonesia; Venue: Istora Gelora Bung Karno; Level: Super 1000; Prize: $1,250,000; Format: 32MS/32WS/32MD/32WD/32XD	(Indonesia) Marcus Fernaldi Gideon (Indonesia) Kevin Sanjaya Sukamuljo	(Japan) Takuto Inoue (Japan) Yuki Kaneko
2 July	Indonesia Open (Draw): Host: Jakarta, Indonesia; Venue: Istora Gelora Bung Karno; Level: Super 1000; Prize: $1,250,000; Format: 32MS/32WS/32MD/32WD/32XD	Score: 21–13, 21–16	
2 July	Indonesia Open (Draw): Host: Jakarta, Indonesia; Venue: Istora Gelora Bung Karno; Level: Super 1000; Prize: $1,250,000; Format: 32MS/32WS/32MD/32WD/32XD	(Japan) Yuki Fukushima (Japan) Sayaka Hirota	(Japan) Mayu Matsumoto (Japan) Wakana Nagahara
2 July	Indonesia Open (Draw): Host: Jakarta, Indonesia; Venue: Istora Gelora Bung Karno; Level: Super 1000; Prize: $1,250,000; Format: 32MS/32WS/32MD/32WD/32XD	Score: 21–14, 16–21, 21–14	
2 July	Indonesia Open (Draw): Host: Jakarta, Indonesia; Venue: Istora Gelora Bung Karno; Level: Super 1000; Prize: $1,250,000; Format: 32MS/32WS/32MD/32WD/32XD	(Indonesia) Tontowi Ahmad (Indonesia) Liliyana Natsir	(Malaysia) Chan Peng Soon (Malaysia) Goh Liu Ying
2 July	Indonesia Open (Draw): Host: Jakarta, Indonesia; Venue: Istora Gelora Bung Karno; Level: Super 1000; Prize: $1,250,000; Format: 32MS/32WS/32MD/32WD/32XD	Score: 21–17, 21–8	
2 July	White Nights: Host: Gatchina, Russia; Level: International Challenge; Prize: $25,000; Format: 64MS/64WS/32MD/32WD/32XD	(Spain) Pablo Abián	(India) Ajay Jayaram
2 July	White Nights: Host: Gatchina, Russia; Level: International Challenge; Prize: $25,000; Format: 64MS/64WS/32MD/32WD/32XD	Score: 11–21, 21–16, 21–17	
2 July	White Nights: Host: Gatchina, Russia; Level: International Challenge; Prize: $25,000; Format: 64MS/64WS/32MD/32WD/32XD	(Hong Kong) Deng Xuan	(Singapore) Yeo Jia Min
2 July	White Nights: Host: Gatchina, Russia; Level: International Challenge; Prize: $25,000; Format: 64MS/64WS/32MD/32WD/32XD	Score: 21–7, 13–21, 21–17	
2 July	White Nights: Host: Gatchina, Russia; Level: International Challenge; Prize: $25,000; Format: 64MS/64WS/32MD/32WD/32XD	(Germany) Bjarne Geiss (Germany) Jan Colin Völker	(Germany) Daniel Hess (Germany) Johannes Pistorius
2 July	White Nights: Host: Gatchina, Russia; Level: International Challenge; Prize: $25,000; Format: 64MS/64WS/32MD/32WD/32XD	Score: 16–21, 24–22, 21–18	
2 July	White Nights: Host: Gatchina, Russia; Level: International Challenge; Prize: $25,000; Format: 64MS/64WS/32MD/32WD/32XD	(Japan) Akane Araki (Japan) Riko Imai	(Japan) Asumi Kugo (Japan) Megumi Yokoyama
2 July	White Nights: Host: Gatchina, Russia; Level: International Challenge; Prize: $25,000; Format: 64MS/64WS/32MD/32WD/32XD	Score: 21–18, 21–12	
2 July	White Nights: Host: Gatchina, Russia; Level: International Challenge; Prize: $25,000; Format: 64MS/64WS/32MD/32WD/32XD	(Russia) Rodion Alimov (Russia) Alina Davletova	(Singapore) Jason Wong Guang Liang (Singapore) Citra Putri Sari Dewi
2 July	White Nights: Host: Gatchina, Russia; Level: International Challenge; Prize: $25,000; Format: 64MS/64WS/32MD/32WD/32XD	Score: 21–14, 21–19	
9 July	Thailand Open (Draw): Host: Bangkok, Thailand; Venue: Nimibutr Stadium; Level: Super 500; Prize: $350,000; Format: 32MS/32WS/32MD/32WD/32XD	(Japan) Kanta Tsuneyama	(Indonesia) Tommy Sugiarto
9 July	Thailand Open (Draw): Host: Bangkok, Thailand; Venue: Nimibutr Stadium; Level: Super 500; Prize: $350,000; Format: 32MS/32WS/32MD/32WD/32XD	Score: 21–16, 13–21, 21–9	
9 July	Thailand Open (Draw): Host: Bangkok, Thailand; Venue: Nimibutr Stadium; Level: Super 500; Prize: $350,000; Format: 32MS/32WS/32MD/32WD/32XD	(Japan) Nozomi Okuhara	(India) P. V. Sindhu
9 July	Thailand Open (Draw): Host: Bangkok, Thailand; Venue: Nimibutr Stadium; Level: Super 500; Prize: $350,000; Format: 32MS/32WS/32MD/32WD/32XD	Score: 21–15, 21–18	
9 July	Thailand Open (Draw): Host: Bangkok, Thailand; Venue: Nimibutr Stadium; Level: Super 500; Prize: $350,000; Format: 32MS/32WS/32MD/32WD/32XD	(Japan) Takeshi Kamura (Japan) Keigo Sonoda	(Japan) Hiroyuki Endo (Japan) Yuta Watanabe
9 July	Thailand Open (Draw): Host: Bangkok, Thailand; Venue: Nimibutr Stadium; Level: Super 500; Prize: $350,000; Format: 32MS/32WS/32MD/32WD/32XD	Score: 21–17, 21–19	
9 July	Thailand Open (Draw): Host: Bangkok, Thailand; Venue: Nimibutr Stadium; Level: Super 500; Prize: $350,000; Format: 32MS/32WS/32MD/32WD/32XD	(Indonesia) Greysia Polii (Indonesia) Apriyani Rahayu	(Japan) Misaki Matsutomo (Japan) Ayaka Takahashi
9 July	Thailand Open (Draw): Host: Bangkok, Thailand; Venue: Nimibutr Stadium; Level: Super 500; Prize: $350,000; Format: 32MS/32WS/32MD/32WD/32XD	Score: 21–13, 21–10	
9 July	Thailand Open (Draw): Host: Bangkok, Thailand; Venue: Nimibutr Stadium; Level: Super 500; Prize: $350,000; Format: 32MS/32WS/32MD/32WD/32XD	(Indonesia) Hafiz Faizal (Indonesia) Gloria Emanuelle Widjaja	(England) Chris Adcock (England) Gabby Adcock
9 July	Thailand Open (Draw): Host: Bangkok, Thailand; Venue: Nimibutr Stadium; Level: Super 500; Prize: $350,000; Format: 32MS/32WS/32MD/32WD/32XD	Score: 21–12, 21–12	
9 July	Ghana International: Host: Tema, Ghana; Level: International Series; Prize: $10,000; Format: 32MS/32WS/32MD/8WD/32XD	(India) Harsheel Dani	(India) Siddharath Thakur
9 July	Ghana International: Host: Tema, Ghana; Level: International Series; Prize: $10,000; Format: 32MS/32WS/32MD/8WD/32XD	Score: 14–21, 21–16, 23–21	
9 July	Ghana International: Host: Tema, Ghana; Level: International Series; Prize: $10,000; Format: 32MS/32WS/32MD/8WD/32XD	(Israel) Ksenia Polikarpova	(Mauritius) Aurélie Allet
9 July	Ghana International: Host: Tema, Ghana; Level: International Series; Prize: $10,000; Format: 32MS/32WS/32MD/8WD/32XD	Score: 21–5, 21–5	
9 July	Ghana International: Host: Tema, Ghana; Level: International Series; Prize: $10,000; Format: 32MS/32WS/32MD/8WD/32XD	(India) Vasantha Kumar Hanumaiah Raganatha (India) Ashith Surya	(India) Vaibhaav (India) Prakash Raj
9 July	Ghana International: Host: Tema, Ghana; Level: International Series; Prize: $10,000; Format: 32MS/32WS/32MD/8WD/32XD	Score: 21–14, 15–21, 21–18	
9 July	Ghana International: Host: Tema, Ghana; Level: International Series; Prize: $10,000; Format: 32MS/32WS/32MD/8WD/32XD	(India) Harika Veludurthi (India) Karishma Wadkar	(Ghana) Grace Annabel Atipaka (Ghana) Stella Bentum
9 July	Ghana International: Host: Tema, Ghana; Level: International Series; Prize: $10,000; Format: 32MS/32WS/32MD/8WD/32XD	Score: 21–7, 21–10	
9 July	Ghana International: Host: Tema, Ghana; Level: International Series; Prize: $10,000; Format: 32MS/32WS/32MD/8WD/32XD	(India) Vighnesh Devlekar (India) Harika Veludurthi	(India) Karishma Wadkar (India) Utkarsh Arora
9 July	Ghana International: Host: Tema, Ghana; Level: International Series; Prize: $10,000; Format: 32MS/32WS/32MD/8WD/32XD	Score: 21–19, 22–20	
16 July	Singapore Open (Draw): Host: Singapore; Venue: Singapore Indoor Stadium; Level: Super 500; Prize: $350,000; Format: 32MS/32WS/32MD/32WD/32XD	(Chinese Taipei) Chou Tien-chen	(Chinese Taipei) Hsu Jen-hao
16 July	Singapore Open (Draw): Host: Singapore; Venue: Singapore Indoor Stadium; Level: Super 500; Prize: $350,000; Format: 32MS/32WS/32MD/32WD/32XD	Score: 21–13, 21–13	
16 July	Singapore Open (Draw): Host: Singapore; Venue: Singapore Indoor Stadium; Level: Super 500; Prize: $350,000; Format: 32MS/32WS/32MD/32WD/32XD	(Japan) Sayaka Takahashi	(China) Gao Fangjie
16 July	Singapore Open (Draw): Host: Singapore; Venue: Singapore Indoor Stadium; Level: Super 500; Prize: $350,000; Format: 32MS/32WS/32MD/32WD/32XD	Score: 25–23, 21–14	
16 July	Singapore Open (Draw): Host: Singapore; Venue: Singapore Indoor Stadium; Level: Super 500; Prize: $350,000; Format: 32MS/32WS/32MD/32WD/32XD	(Indonesia) Mohammad Ahsan (Indonesia) Hendra Setiawan	(China) Ou Xuanyi (China) Ren Xiangyu
16 July	Singapore Open (Draw): Host: Singapore; Venue: Singapore Indoor Stadium; Level: Super 500; Prize: $350,000; Format: 32MS/32WS/32MD/32WD/32XD	Score: 21–13, 21–19	
16 July	Singapore Open (Draw): Host: Singapore; Venue: Singapore Indoor Stadium; Level: Super 500; Prize: $350,000; Format: 32MS/32WS/32MD/32WD/32XD	(Japan) Ayako Sakuramoto (Japan) Yukiko Takahata	(Japan) Nami Matsuyama (Japan) Chiharu Shida
16 July	Singapore Open (Draw): Host: Singapore; Venue: Singapore Indoor Stadium; Level: Super 500; Prize: $350,000; Format: 32MS/32WS/32MD/32WD/32XD	Score: 16–21, 24–22, 21–13	
16 July	Singapore Open (Draw): Host: Singapore; Venue: Singapore Indoor Stadium; Level: Super 500; Prize: $350,000; Format: 32MS/32WS/32MD/32WD/32XD	(Malaysia) Goh Soon Huat (Malaysia) Shevon Jemie Lai	(Indonesia) Tontowi Ahmad (Indonesia) Liliyana Natsir
16 July	Singapore Open (Draw): Host: Singapore; Venue: Singapore Indoor Stadium; Level: Super 500; Prize: $350,000; Format: 32MS/32WS/32MD/32WD/32XD	Score: 21–19, 21–18	
16 July	Lagos International: Host: Lagos, Nigeria; Level: International Challenge; Prize: $25,000; Format: 32MS/32WS/32MD/8WD/32XD	(Israel) Misha Zilberman	(Malaysia) Misbun Ramdan Mohmed Misbun
16 July	Lagos International: Host: Lagos, Nigeria; Level: International Challenge; Prize: $25,000; Format: 32MS/32WS/32MD/8WD/32XD	Score: 11–21, 21–19, 21–12	
16 July	Lagos International: Host: Lagos, Nigeria; Level: International Challenge; Prize: $25,000; Format: 32MS/32WS/32MD/8WD/32XD	(Israel) Ksenia Polikarpova	(India) Sri Krishna Priya Kudaravalli
16 July	Lagos International: Host: Lagos, Nigeria; Level: International Challenge; Prize: $25,000; Format: 32MS/32WS/32MD/8WD/32XD	Score: 20–22, 21–16, 27–25	
16 July	Lagos International: Host: Lagos, Nigeria; Level: International Challenge; Prize: $25,000; Format: 32MS/32WS/32MD/8WD/32XD	(India) Manu Attri (India) B. Sumeeth Reddy	(India) Vaibhaav (India) Prakash Raj
16 July	Lagos International: Host: Lagos, Nigeria; Level: International Challenge; Prize: $25,000; Format: 32MS/32WS/32MD/8WD/32XD	Score: 21–12, 21–12	
16 July	Lagos International: Host: Lagos, Nigeria; Level: International Challenge; Prize: $25,000; Format: 32MS/32WS/32MD/8WD/32XD	(India) Kuhoo Garg (India) Riya Mookerjee	(India) Harika Veludurthi (India) Karishma Wadkar
16 July	Lagos International: Host: Lagos, Nigeria; Level: International Challenge; Prize: $25,000; Format: 32MS/32WS/32MD/8WD/32XD	Score: 21–10, 21–19	
16 July	Lagos International: Host: Lagos, Nigeria; Level: International Challenge; Prize: $25,000; Format: 32MS/32WS/32MD/8WD/32XD	(India) Manu Attri (India) K. Maneesha	(India) Rohan Kapoor (India) Kuhoo Garg
16 July	Lagos International: Host: Lagos, Nigeria; Level: International Challenge; Prize: $25,000; Format: 32MS/32WS/32MD/8WD/32XD	Score: 21–17, 23–21	
23 July	Akita Masters (Draw): Host: Akita, Akita Prefecture, Japan; Venue: CNA Arena Akita; Level: Super 100; Prize: $75,000; Format: 64MS/32WS/32MD/32WD/32XD	(Thailand) Sitthikom Thammasin	(Indonesia) Ihsan Maulana Mustofa
23 July	Akita Masters (Draw): Host: Akita, Akita Prefecture, Japan; Venue: CNA Arena Akita; Level: Super 100; Prize: $75,000; Format: 64MS/32WS/32MD/32WD/32XD	Score: 21–10, 21–13	
23 July	Akita Masters (Draw): Host: Akita, Akita Prefecture, Japan; Venue: CNA Arena Akita; Level: Super 100; Prize: $75,000; Format: 64MS/32WS/32MD/32WD/32XD	(Japan) Sayaka Takahashi	(Japan) Mako Urushizaki
23 July	Akita Masters (Draw): Host: Akita, Akita Prefecture, Japan; Venue: CNA Arena Akita; Level: Super 100; Prize: $75,000; Format: 64MS/32WS/32MD/32WD/32XD	Score: 21–11, 13–21, 21–18	
23 July	Akita Masters (Draw): Host: Akita, Akita Prefecture, Japan; Venue: CNA Arena Akita; Level: Super 100; Prize: $75,000; Format: 64MS/32WS/32MD/32WD/32XD	(Indonesia) Akbar Bintang Cahyono (Indonesia) Muhammad Reza Pahlevi Isfahani	(Japan) Hirokatsu Hashimoto (Japan) Hiroyuki Saeki
23 July	Akita Masters (Draw): Host: Akita, Akita Prefecture, Japan; Venue: CNA Arena Akita; Level: Super 100; Prize: $75,000; Format: 64MS/32WS/32MD/32WD/32XD	Score: 21–16, 21–6	
23 July	Akita Masters (Draw): Host: Akita, Akita Prefecture, Japan; Venue: CNA Arena Akita; Level: Super 100; Prize: $75,000; Format: 64MS/32WS/32MD/32WD/32XD	(Japan) Ayako Sakuramoto (Japan) Yukiko Takahata	(Japan) Nami Matsuyama (Japan) Chiharu Shida
23 July	Akita Masters (Draw): Host: Akita, Akita Prefecture, Japan; Venue: CNA Arena Akita; Level: Super 100; Prize: $75,000; Format: 64MS/32WS/32MD/32WD/32XD	Score: 23–21, 21–11	
23 July	Akita Masters (Draw): Host: Akita, Akita Prefecture, Japan; Venue: CNA Arena Akita; Level: Super 100; Prize: $75,000; Format: 64MS/32WS/32MD/32WD/32XD	(Japan) Kohei Gondo (Japan) Ayane Kurihara	(Indonesia) Alfian Eko Prasetya (Indonesia) Angelica Wiratama
23 July	Akita Masters (Draw): Host: Akita, Akita Prefecture, Japan; Venue: CNA Arena Akita; Level: Super 100; Prize: $75,000; Format: 64MS/32WS/32MD/32WD/32XD	Score: 21–9, 21–23, 21–17	
23 July	Russian Open (Draw): Host: Vladivostok, Russia; Venue: Olympic Sports Hall; Level: Super 100; Prize: $75,000; Format: 64MS/32WS/32MD/32WD/32XD	(India) Sourabh Verma	(Japan) Koki Watanabe
23 July	Russian Open (Draw): Host: Vladivostok, Russia; Venue: Olympic Sports Hall; Level: Super 100; Prize: $75,000; Format: 64MS/32WS/32MD/32WD/32XD	Score: 18–21, 21–12, 21–17	
23 July	Russian Open (Draw): Host: Vladivostok, Russia; Venue: Olympic Sports Hall; Level: Super 100; Prize: $75,000; Format: 64MS/32WS/32MD/32WD/32XD	(Malaysia) Ho Yen Mei	(Japan) Shiori Ebihara
23 July	Russian Open (Draw): Host: Vladivostok, Russia; Venue: Olympic Sports Hall; Level: Super 100; Prize: $75,000; Format: 64MS/32WS/32MD/32WD/32XD	Score: 22–20, 11–21, 21–18	
23 July	Russian Open (Draw): Host: Vladivostok, Russia; Venue: Olympic Sports Hall; Level: Super 100; Prize: $75,000; Format: 64MS/32WS/32MD/32WD/32XD	(Malaysia) Mohamad Arif Abdul Latif (Malaysia) Nur Mohd Azriyn Ayub	(Russia) Konstantin Abramov (Russia) Alexandr Zinchenko
23 July	Russian Open (Draw): Host: Vladivostok, Russia; Venue: Olympic Sports Hall; Level: Super 100; Prize: $75,000; Format: 64MS/32WS/32MD/32WD/32XD	Score: Walkover	
23 July	Russian Open (Draw): Host: Vladivostok, Russia; Venue: Olympic Sports Hall; Level: Super 100; Prize: $75,000; Format: 64MS/32WS/32MD/32WD/32XD	(Japan) Chisato Hoshi (Japan) Kie Nakanishi	(Malaysia) Chow Mei Kuan (Malaysia) Lee Meng Yean
23 July	Russian Open (Draw): Host: Vladivostok, Russia; Venue: Olympic Sports Hall; Level: Super 100; Prize: $75,000; Format: 64MS/32WS/32MD/32WD/32XD	Score: 21–11, 21–18	
23 July	Russian Open (Draw): Host: Vladivostok, Russia; Venue: Olympic Sports Hall; Level: Super 100; Prize: $75,000; Format: 64MS/32WS/32MD/32WD/32XD	(Russia) Vladimir Ivanov (South Korea) Kim Min-kyung	(India) Rohan Kapoor (India) Kuhoo Garg
23 July	Russian Open (Draw): Host: Vladivostok, Russia; Venue: Olympic Sports Hall; Level: Super 100; Prize: $75,000; Format: 64MS/32WS/32MD/32WD/32XD	Score: 21–19, 21–17	
30 July	World Championships (Draw): Host: Nanjing, China; Venue: Nanjing Olympic Sports Centre; Level: World Championships; Prize: N/A; Format: 64MS/64WS/64MD/64WD/64XD	(Japan) Kento Momota	(China) Shi Yuqi
30 July	World Championships (Draw): Host: Nanjing, China; Venue: Nanjing Olympic Sports Centre; Level: World Championships; Prize: N/A; Format: 64MS/64WS/64MD/64WD/64XD	Score: 21–11, 21–13	
30 July	World Championships (Draw): Host: Nanjing, China; Venue: Nanjing Olympic Sports Centre; Level: World Championships; Prize: N/A; Format: 64MS/64WS/64MD/64WD/64XD	(Spain) Carolina Marín	(India) P. V. Sindhu
30 July	World Championships (Draw): Host: Nanjing, China; Venue: Nanjing Olympic Sports Centre; Level: World Championships; Prize: N/A; Format: 64MS/64WS/64MD/64WD/64XD	Score: 21–19, 21–10	
30 July	World Championships (Draw): Host: Nanjing, China; Venue: Nanjing Olympic Sports Centre; Level: World Championships; Prize: N/A; Format: 64MS/64WS/64MD/64WD/64XD	(China) Li Junhui (China) Liu Yuchen	(Japan) Takeshi Kamura (Japan) Keigo Sonoda
30 July	World Championships (Draw): Host: Nanjing, China; Venue: Nanjing Olympic Sports Centre; Level: World Championships; Prize: N/A; Format: 64MS/64WS/64MD/64WD/64XD	Score: 21–12, 21–19	
30 July	World Championships (Draw): Host: Nanjing, China; Venue: Nanjing Olympic Sports Centre; Level: World Championships; Prize: N/A; Format: 64MS/64WS/64MD/64WD/64XD	(Japan) Mayu Matsumoto (Japan) Wakana Nagahara	(Japan) Yuki Fukushima (Japan) Sayaka Hirota
30 July	World Championships (Draw): Host: Nanjing, China; Venue: Nanjing Olympic Sports Centre; Level: World Championships; Prize: N/A; Format: 64MS/64WS/64MD/64WD/64XD	Score: 19–21, 21–19, 22–20	
30 July	World Championships (Draw): Host: Nanjing, China; Venue: Nanjing Olympic Sports Centre; Level: World Championships; Prize: N/A; Format: 64MS/64WS/64MD/64WD/64XD	(China) Zheng Siwei (China) Huang Yaqiong	(China) Wang Yilyu (China) Huang Dongping
30 July	World Championships (Draw): Host: Nanjing, China; Venue: Nanjing Olympic Sports Centre; Level: World Championships; Prize: N/A; Format: 64MS/64WS/64MD/64WD/64XD	Score: 21–17, 21–19	

=== August ===
Week commencing	Tournament	Champions	Runners-up
6 August	Vietnam Open (Draw): Host: Ho Chi Minh City, Vietnam; Venue: Nguyen Du Cultural Sports Club; Level: Super 100; Prize: $75,000; Format: 64MS/32WS/32MD/32WD/32XD	(Indonesia) Shesar Hiren Rhustavito	(India) Ajay Jayaram
6 August	Vietnam Open (Draw): Host: Ho Chi Minh City, Vietnam; Venue: Nguyen Du Cultural Sports Club; Level: Super 100; Prize: $75,000; Format: 64MS/32WS/32MD/32WD/32XD	Score: 21–14, 21–10	
6 August	Vietnam Open (Draw): Host: Ho Chi Minh City, Vietnam; Venue: Nguyen Du Cultural Sports Club; Level: Super 100; Prize: $75,000; Format: 64MS/32WS/32MD/32WD/32XD	(Singapore) Yeo Jia Min	(China) Han Yue
6 August	Vietnam Open (Draw): Host: Ho Chi Minh City, Vietnam; Venue: Nguyen Du Cultural Sports Club; Level: Super 100; Prize: $75,000; Format: 64MS/32WS/32MD/32WD/32XD	Score: 21–19, 21–19	
6 August	Vietnam Open (Draw): Host: Ho Chi Minh City, Vietnam; Venue: Nguyen Du Cultural Sports Club; Level: Super 100; Prize: $75,000; Format: 64MS/32WS/32MD/32WD/32XD	(South Korea) Ko Sung-hyun (South Korea) Shin Baek-cheol	(Chinese Taipei) Lee Sheng-mu (Chinese Taipei) Yang Po-hsuan
6 August	Vietnam Open (Draw): Host: Ho Chi Minh City, Vietnam; Venue: Nguyen Du Cultural Sports Club; Level: Super 100; Prize: $75,000; Format: 64MS/32WS/32MD/32WD/32XD	Score: 22–20, 21–18	
6 August	Vietnam Open (Draw): Host: Ho Chi Minh City, Vietnam; Venue: Nguyen Du Cultural Sports Club; Level: Super 100; Prize: $75,000; Format: 64MS/32WS/32MD/32WD/32XD	(Japan) Misato Aratama (Japan) Akane Watanabe	(Japan) Nami Matsuyama (Japan) Chiharu Shida
6 August	Vietnam Open (Draw): Host: Ho Chi Minh City, Vietnam; Venue: Nguyen Du Cultural Sports Club; Level: Super 100; Prize: $75,000; Format: 64MS/32WS/32MD/32WD/32XD	Score: 21–18, 21–19	
6 August	Vietnam Open (Draw): Host: Ho Chi Minh City, Vietnam; Venue: Nguyen Du Cultural Sports Club; Level: Super 100; Prize: $75,000; Format: 64MS/32WS/32MD/32WD/32XD	(Thailand) Nipitphon Phuangphuapet (Thailand) Savitree Amitrapai	(Indonesia) Alfian Eko Prasetya (Indonesia) Marsheilla Gischa Islami
6 August	Vietnam Open (Draw): Host: Ho Chi Minh City, Vietnam; Venue: Nguyen Du Cultural Sports Club; Level: Super 100; Prize: $75,000; Format: 64MS/32WS/32MD/32WD/32XD	Score: 13–21, 21–18, 21–19	
6 August	U.S. International: Host: Orange County, California, United States; Venue: Orange County Badminton Club; Level: International Series; Prize: $10,000; Format: 32MS/32WS/16MD/16WD/32XD	(Canada) B. R. Sankeerth	(United States) Phillips Jap
6 August	U.S. International: Host: Orange County, California, United States; Venue: Orange County Badminton Club; Level: International Series; Prize: $10,000; Format: 32MS/32WS/16MD/16WD/32XD	Score: 19–21, 21–19, 21–13	
6 August	U.S. International: Host: Orange County, California, United States; Venue: Orange County Badminton Club; Level: International Series; Prize: $10,000; Format: 32MS/32WS/16MD/16WD/32XD	(Japan) Saya Yamamoto	(United States) Lauren Lam
6 August	U.S. International: Host: Orange County, California, United States; Venue: Orange County Badminton Club; Level: International Series; Prize: $10,000; Format: 32MS/32WS/16MD/16WD/32XD	Score: 21–18, 21–13	
6 August	U.S. International: Host: Orange County, California, United States; Venue: Orange County Badminton Club; Level: International Series; Prize: $10,000; Format: 32MS/32WS/16MD/16WD/32XD	(Canada) Joshua Hurlburt-Yu (Canada) Duncan Yao	(United States) Sattawat Pongnairat (Indonesia) Ferdinand Sinarta Surbakti
6 August	U.S. International: Host: Orange County, California, United States; Venue: Orange County Badminton Club; Level: International Series; Prize: $10,000; Format: 32MS/32WS/16MD/16WD/32XD	Score: 18–21, 21–16, 21–18	
6 August	U.S. International: Host: Orange County, California, United States; Venue: Orange County Badminton Club; Level: International Series; Prize: $10,000; Format: 32MS/32WS/16MD/16WD/32XD	(Japan) Akane Araki (Japan) Riko Imai	(United States) Annie Xu (United States) Kerry Xu
6 August	U.S. International: Host: Orange County, California, United States; Venue: Orange County Badminton Club; Level: International Series; Prize: $10,000; Format: 32MS/32WS/16MD/16WD/32XD	Score: 21–15, 21–19	
6 August	U.S. International: Host: Orange County, California, United States; Venue: Orange County Badminton Club; Level: International Series; Prize: $10,000; Format: 32MS/32WS/16MD/16WD/32XD	(Canada) Joshua Hurlburt-Yu (Canada) Josephine Wu	(United States) Sattawat Pongnairat (United States) Kerry Xu
6 August	U.S. International: Host: Orange County, California, United States; Venue: Orange County Badminton Club; Level: International Series; Prize: $10,000; Format: 32MS/32WS/16MD/16WD/32XD	Score: 21–16, 21–13	
13 August	Bulgarian Open: Host: Sofia, Bulgaria; Venue: Badminton Sports Hall; Level: International Series; Prize: $10,000; Format: 32MS/32WS/32MD/32WD/32XD	(France) Toma Junior Popov	(France) Arnaud Merklé
13 August	Bulgarian Open: Host: Sofia, Bulgaria; Venue: Badminton Sports Hall; Level: International Series; Prize: $10,000; Format: 32MS/32WS/32MD/32WD/32XD	Score: 22–20, 21–12	
13 August	Bulgarian Open: Host: Sofia, Bulgaria; Venue: Badminton Sports Hall; Level: International Series; Prize: $10,000; Format: 32MS/32WS/32MD/32WD/32XD	(Turkey) Neslihan Yiğit	(Turkey) Özge Bayrak
13 August	Bulgarian Open: Host: Sofia, Bulgaria; Venue: Badminton Sports Hall; Level: International Series; Prize: $10,000; Format: 32MS/32WS/32MD/32WD/32XD	Score: 21–19, 21–10	
13 August	Bulgarian Open: Host: Sofia, Bulgaria; Venue: Badminton Sports Hall; Level: International Series; Prize: $10,000; Format: 32MS/32WS/32MD/32WD/32XD	(France) Christo Popov (France) Toma Junior Popov	(Chinese Taipei) Chen Yu-jun (Chinese Taipei) Lin Bing-wei
13 August	Bulgarian Open: Host: Sofia, Bulgaria; Venue: Badminton Sports Hall; Level: International Series; Prize: $10,000; Format: 32MS/32WS/32MD/32WD/32XD	Score: 17–21, 21–7, 21–17	
13 August	Bulgarian Open: Host: Sofia, Bulgaria; Venue: Badminton Sports Hall; Level: International Series; Prize: $10,000; Format: 32MS/32WS/32MD/32WD/32XD	(Bulgaria) Gabriela Stoeva (Bulgaria) Stefani Stoeva	(Denmark) Amalie Magelund (Denmark) Freja Ravn
13 August	Bulgarian Open: Host: Sofia, Bulgaria; Venue: Badminton Sports Hall; Level: International Series; Prize: $10,000; Format: 32MS/32WS/32MD/32WD/32XD	Score: 21–16, 21–19	
13 August	Bulgarian Open: Host: Sofia, Bulgaria; Venue: Badminton Sports Hall; Level: International Series; Prize: $10,000; Format: 32MS/32WS/32MD/32WD/32XD	(Bulgaria) Alex Vlaar (Bulgaria) Mariya Mitsova	(Finland) Anton Kaisti (Finland) Inalotta Suutarinen
13 August	Bulgarian Open: Host: Sofia, Bulgaria; Venue: Badminton Sports Hall; Level: International Series; Prize: $10,000; Format: 32MS/32WS/32MD/32WD/32XD	Score: 21–17, 17–21, 21–16	
13 August	Asian Games (Draw): Host: Jakarta, Indonesia; Venue: Istora Gelora Bung Karno; Level: Multisport; Format: 13MT/11WT	China	Indonesia
13 August	Asian Games (Draw): Host: Jakarta, Indonesia; Venue: Istora Gelora Bung Karno; Level: Multisport; Format: 13MT/11WT	Chen Long; Li Junhui; Lin Dan; Liu Cheng; Liu Yuchen; Qiao Bin; Shi Yuqi; Wang Yilyu; Zhang Nan; Zheng Siwei	Tontowi Ahmad; Mohammad Ahsan; Fajar Alfian; Muhammad Rian Ardianto; Jonatan Christie; Marcus Fernaldi Gideon; Anthony Sinisuka Ginting; Ihsan Maulana Mustofa; Kevin Sanjaya Sukamuljo; Ricky Karanda Suwardi
13 August	Asian Games (Draw): Host: Jakarta, Indonesia; Venue: Istora Gelora Bung Karno; Level: Multisport; Format: 13MT/11WT	Score: 3–1	
13 August	Asian Games (Draw): Host: Jakarta, Indonesia; Venue: Istora Gelora Bung Karno; Level: Multisport; Format: 13MT/11WT	Japan	China
13 August	Asian Games (Draw): Host: Jakarta, Indonesia; Venue: Istora Gelora Bung Karno; Level: Multisport; Format: 13MT/11WT	Yuki Fukushima; Arisa Higashino; Sayaka Hirota; Misaki Matsutomo; Aya Ohori; Nozomi Okuhara; Sayaka Sato; Ayaka Takahashi; Akane Yamaguchi; Koharu Yonemoto	Cai Yanyan; Chen Qingchen; Chen Yufei; Gao Fangjie; He Bingjiao; Huang Dongping; Huang Yaqiong; Jia Yifan; Tang Jinhua; Zheng Yu
13 August	Asian Games (Draw): Host: Jakarta, Indonesia; Venue: Istora Gelora Bung Karno; Level: Multisport; Format: 13MT/11WT	Score: 3–1	
20 August	Carebaco International: Host: Paramaribo, Suriname; Venue: Ring Sport Center; Level: Future Series; Prize: TBD; Format: 32MS/16WS/16MD/8WD/16XD	(Luxembourg) Robert Mann	(Suriname) Soren Opti
20 August	Carebaco International: Host: Paramaribo, Suriname; Venue: Ring Sport Center; Level: Future Series; Prize: TBD; Format: 32MS/16WS/16MD/8WD/16XD	Score: 18–21, 21–12, 21–17	
20 August	Carebaco International: Host: Paramaribo, Suriname; Venue: Ring Sport Center; Level: Future Series; Prize: TBD; Format: 32MS/16WS/16MD/8WD/16XD	(Barbados) Tamisha Williams	(Guyana) Priyanna Ramdhani
20 August	Carebaco International: Host: Paramaribo, Suriname; Venue: Ring Sport Center; Level: Future Series; Prize: TBD; Format: 32MS/16WS/16MD/8WD/16XD	Score: 21–17, 17–21, 21–18	
20 August	Carebaco International: Host: Paramaribo, Suriname; Venue: Ring Sport Center; Level: Future Series; Prize: TBD; Format: 32MS/16WS/16MD/8WD/16XD	(Barbados) Shae Michael Martin (Barbados) Dakeil Thorpe	(Suriname) Dylan Darmohoetomo (Suriname) Gilmar Jones
20 August	Carebaco International: Host: Paramaribo, Suriname; Venue: Ring Sport Center; Level: Future Series; Prize: TBD; Format: 32MS/16WS/16MD/8WD/16XD	Score: 21–19, 18–21, 21–16	
20 August	Carebaco International: Host: Paramaribo, Suriname; Venue: Ring Sport Center; Level: Future Series; Prize: TBD; Format: 32MS/16WS/16MD/8WD/16XD	(Barbados) Monyata Riviera (Barbados) Tamisha Williams	(Trinidad and Tobago) Chequeda De Boulet (Guyana) Priyanna Ramdhani
20 August	Carebaco International: Host: Paramaribo, Suriname; Venue: Ring Sport Center; Level: Future Series; Prize: TBD; Format: 32MS/16WS/16MD/8WD/16XD	Score: 21–15, 21–14	
20 August	Carebaco International: Host: Paramaribo, Suriname; Venue: Ring Sport Center; Level: Future Series; Prize: TBD; Format: 32MS/16WS/16MD/8WD/16XD	(Suriname) Dylan Darmohoetomo (Suriname) Crystal Leefmans	(Barbados) Dakeil Jonathan Thorpe (Barbados) Tamisha Williams
20 August	Carebaco International: Host: Paramaribo, Suriname; Venue: Ring Sport Center; Level: Future Series; Prize: TBD; Format: 32MS/16WS/16MD/8WD/16XD	Score: 22–20, 18–21, 21–19	
20 August	Asian Games (Draw): Host: Jakarta, Indonesia; Venue: Istora Gelora Bung Karno; Level: Multisport; Format: 33MS/31WS/29MD/26WD/26XD	(Indonesia) Jonatan Christie	(Chinese Taipei) Chou Tien-chen
20 August	Asian Games (Draw): Host: Jakarta, Indonesia; Venue: Istora Gelora Bung Karno; Level: Multisport; Format: 33MS/31WS/29MD/26WD/26XD	Score: 21–18, 20–22, 21–15	
20 August	Asian Games (Draw): Host: Jakarta, Indonesia; Venue: Istora Gelora Bung Karno; Level: Multisport; Format: 33MS/31WS/29MD/26WD/26XD	(Chinese Taipei) Tai Tzu-ying	(India) P. V. Sindhu
20 August	Asian Games (Draw): Host: Jakarta, Indonesia; Venue: Istora Gelora Bung Karno; Level: Multisport; Format: 33MS/31WS/29MD/26WD/26XD	Score: 21–13, 21–16	
20 August	Asian Games (Draw): Host: Jakarta, Indonesia; Venue: Istora Gelora Bung Karno; Level: Multisport; Format: 33MS/31WS/29MD/26WD/26XD	(Indonesia) Marcus Fernaldi Gideon (Indonesia) Kevin Sanjaya Sukamuljo	(Indonesia) Fajar Alfian (Indonesia) Muhammad Rian Ardianto
20 August	Asian Games (Draw): Host: Jakarta, Indonesia; Venue: Istora Gelora Bung Karno; Level: Multisport; Format: 33MS/31WS/29MD/26WD/26XD	Score: 13–21, 21–18, 24–22	
20 August	Asian Games (Draw): Host: Jakarta, Indonesia; Venue: Istora Gelora Bung Karno; Level: Multisport; Format: 33MS/31WS/29MD/26WD/26XD	(China) Chen Qingchen (China) Jia Yifan	(Japan) Misaki Matsutomo (Japan) Ayaka Takahashi
20 August	Asian Games (Draw): Host: Jakarta, Indonesia; Venue: Istora Gelora Bung Karno; Level: Multisport; Format: 33MS/31WS/29MD/26WD/26XD	Score: 22–20, 22–20	
20 August	Asian Games (Draw): Host: Jakarta, Indonesia; Venue: Istora Gelora Bung Karno; Level: Multisport; Format: 33MS/31WS/29MD/26WD/26XD	(China) Zheng Siwei (China) Huang Yaqiong	(Hong Kong) Tang Chun Man (Hong Kong) Tse Ying Suet
20 August	Asian Games (Draw): Host: Jakarta, Indonesia; Venue: Istora Gelora Bung Karno; Level: Multisport; Format: 33MS/31WS/29MD/26WD/26XD	Score: 21–8, 21–15	
27 August	Spain Masters (Draw): Host: Barcelona, Spain; Venue: Vall d’Hebron Olympic Sports Center; Level: Super 300; Prize: $150,000; Format: 32MS/32WS/32MD/32WD/32XD	(Denmark) Rasmus Gemke	(Thailand) Suppanyu Avihingsanon
27 August	Spain Masters (Draw): Host: Barcelona, Spain; Venue: Vall d’Hebron Olympic Sports Center; Level: Super 300; Prize: $150,000; Format: 32MS/32WS/32MD/32WD/32XD	Score: 15–21, 21–6, 21–14	
27 August	Spain Masters (Draw): Host: Barcelona, Spain; Venue: Vall d’Hebron Olympic Sports Center; Level: Super 300; Prize: $150,000; Format: 32MS/32WS/32MD/32WD/32XD	(Japan) Minatsu Mitani	(Denmark) Mia Blichfeldt
27 August	Spain Masters (Draw): Host: Barcelona, Spain; Venue: Vall d’Hebron Olympic Sports Center; Level: Super 300; Prize: $150,000; Format: 32MS/32WS/32MD/32WD/32XD	Score: 9–21, 23–21, 21–8	
27 August	Spain Masters (Draw): Host: Barcelona, Spain; Venue: Vall d’Hebron Olympic Sports Center; Level: Super 300; Prize: $150,000; Format: 32MS/32WS/32MD/32WD/32XD	(South Korea) Kim Gi-jung (South Korea) Lee Yong-dae	(Thailand) Bodin Isara (Thailand) Maneepong Jongjit
27 August	Spain Masters (Draw): Host: Barcelona, Spain; Venue: Vall d’Hebron Olympic Sports Center; Level: Super 300; Prize: $150,000; Format: 32MS/32WS/32MD/32WD/32XD	Score: 21–13, 21–17	
27 August	Spain Masters (Draw): Host: Barcelona, Spain; Venue: Vall d’Hebron Olympic Sports Center; Level: Super 300; Prize: $150,000; Format: 32MS/32WS/32MD/32WD/32XD	(Japan) Mayu Matsumoto (Japan) Wakana Nagahara	(Japan) Ayako Sakuramoto (Japan) Yukiko Takahata
27 August	Spain Masters (Draw): Host: Barcelona, Spain; Venue: Vall d’Hebron Olympic Sports Center; Level: Super 300; Prize: $150,000; Format: 32MS/32WS/32MD/32WD/32XD	Score: 21–17, 21–13	
27 August	Spain Masters (Draw): Host: Barcelona, Spain; Venue: Vall d’Hebron Olympic Sports Center; Level: Super 300; Prize: $150,000; Format: 32MS/32WS/32MD/32WD/32XD	(Denmark) Niclas Nøhr (Denmark) Sara Thygesen	(England) Marcus Ellis (England) Lauren Smith
27 August	Spain Masters (Draw): Host: Barcelona, Spain; Venue: Vall d’Hebron Olympic Sports Center; Level: Super 300; Prize: $150,000; Format: 32MS/32WS/32MD/32WD/32XD	Score: 21–19, 21–17	
27 August	Kharkiv International: Host: Kharkiv, Ukraine; Venue: Lokomotiv Sports Palace; Level: International Challenge; Prize: $25,000; Format: 64MS/64WS/32MD/32WD/32XD	(Czech Republic) Jan Louda	(Azerbaijan) Ade Resky Dwicahyo
27 August	Kharkiv International: Host: Kharkiv, Ukraine; Venue: Lokomotiv Sports Palace; Level: International Challenge; Prize: $25,000; Format: 64MS/64WS/32MD/32WD/32XD	Score: 21–14, 21–18	
27 August	Kharkiv International: Host: Kharkiv, Ukraine; Venue: Lokomotiv Sports Palace; Level: International Challenge; Prize: $25,000; Format: 64MS/64WS/32MD/32WD/32XD	(Turkey) Özge Bayrak	(Turkey) Aliye Demirbağ
27 August	Kharkiv International: Host: Kharkiv, Ukraine; Venue: Lokomotiv Sports Palace; Level: International Challenge; Prize: $25,000; Format: 64MS/64WS/32MD/32WD/32XD	Score: 20–22, 21–18, 21–14	
27 August	Kharkiv International: Host: Kharkiv, Ukraine; Venue: Lokomotiv Sports Palace; Level: International Challenge; Prize: $25,000; Format: 64MS/64WS/32MD/32WD/32XD	(India) Krishna Prasad Garaga (India) Dhruv Kapila	(Germany) Daniel Hess (Germany) Johannes Pistorius
27 August	Kharkiv International: Host: Kharkiv, Ukraine; Venue: Lokomotiv Sports Palace; Level: International Challenge; Prize: $25,000; Format: 64MS/64WS/32MD/32WD/32XD	Score: 21–19, 21–16	
27 August	Kharkiv International: Host: Kharkiv, Ukraine; Venue: Lokomotiv Sports Palace; Level: International Challenge; Prize: $25,000; Format: 64MS/64WS/32MD/32WD/32XD	(Sweden) Amanda Högström (Sweden) Clara Nistad	(Estonia) Kristin Kuuba (Estonia) Kati-Kreet Marran
27 August	Kharkiv International: Host: Kharkiv, Ukraine; Venue: Lokomotiv Sports Palace; Level: International Challenge; Prize: $25,000; Format: 64MS/64WS/32MD/32WD/32XD	Score: 21–8, 21–11	
27 August	Kharkiv International: Host: Kharkiv, Ukraine; Venue: Lokomotiv Sports Palace; Level: International Challenge; Prize: $25,000; Format: 64MS/64WS/32MD/32WD/32XD	(India) Saurabh Sharma (India) Anoushka Parikh	(Poland) Paweł Śmiłowski (Poland) Magdalena Świerczyńska
27 August	Kharkiv International: Host: Kharkiv, Ukraine; Venue: Lokomotiv Sports Palace; Level: International Challenge; Prize: $25,000; Format: 64MS/64WS/32MD/32WD/32XD	Score: 18–21, 21–19, 22–20	

=== September ===
Week commencing	Tournament	Champions	Runners-up
3 September	Hyderabad Open (Draw): Host: Hyderabad Open, India; Venue: G. M. C. Balayogi SATS Indoor Stadium; Level: Super 100; Prize: $75,000; Format: 64MS/32WS/32MD/32WD/32XD	(India) Sameer Verma	(Malaysia) Soong Joo Ven
3 September	Hyderabad Open (Draw): Host: Hyderabad Open, India; Venue: G. M. C. Balayogi SATS Indoor Stadium; Level: Super 100; Prize: $75,000; Format: 64MS/32WS/32MD/32WD/32XD	Score: 21–15, 21–18	
3 September	Hyderabad Open (Draw): Host: Hyderabad Open, India; Venue: G. M. C. Balayogi SATS Indoor Stadium; Level: Super 100; Prize: $75,000; Format: 64MS/32WS/32MD/32WD/32XD	(South Korea) Kim Ga-eun	(Hong Kong) Deng Xuan
3 September	Hyderabad Open (Draw): Host: Hyderabad Open, India; Venue: G. M. C. Balayogi SATS Indoor Stadium; Level: Super 100; Prize: $75,000; Format: 64MS/32WS/32MD/32WD/32XD	Score: 21–9, 18–21, 21–17	
3 September	Hyderabad Open (Draw): Host: Hyderabad Open, India; Venue: G. M. C. Balayogi SATS Indoor Stadium; Level: Super 100; Prize: $75,000; Format: 64MS/32WS/32MD/32WD/32XD	(India) Satwiksairaj Rankireddy (India) Chirag Shetty	(Indonesia) Akbar Bintang Cahyono (Indonesia) Moh Reza Pahlevi Isfahani
3 September	Hyderabad Open (Draw): Host: Hyderabad Open, India; Venue: G. M. C. Balayogi SATS Indoor Stadium; Level: Super 100; Prize: $75,000; Format: 64MS/32WS/32MD/32WD/32XD	Score: 21–16, 21–14	
3 September	Hyderabad Open (Draw): Host: Hyderabad Open, India; Venue: G. M. C. Balayogi SATS Indoor Stadium; Level: Super 100; Prize: $75,000; Format: 64MS/32WS/32MD/32WD/32XD	(Hong Kong) Ng Tsz Yau (Hong Kong) Yuen Sin Ying	(Malaysia) Vivian Hoo (Malaysia) Yap Cheng Wen
3 September	Hyderabad Open (Draw): Host: Hyderabad Open, India; Venue: G. M. C. Balayogi SATS Indoor Stadium; Level: Super 100; Prize: $75,000; Format: 64MS/32WS/32MD/32WD/32XD	Score: 21–18, 16–21, 21–14	
3 September	Hyderabad Open (Draw): Host: Hyderabad Open, India; Venue: G. M. C. Balayogi SATS Indoor Stadium; Level: Super 100; Prize: $75,000; Format: 64MS/32WS/32MD/32WD/32XD	(Indonesia) Akbar Bintang Cahyono (Indonesia) Winny Oktavina Kandow	(India) Pranaav Jerry Chopra (India) N. Sikki Reddy
3 September	Hyderabad Open (Draw): Host: Hyderabad Open, India; Venue: G. M. C. Balayogi SATS Indoor Stadium; Level: Super 100; Prize: $75,000; Format: 64MS/32WS/32MD/32WD/32XD	Score: 15–21, 21–19, 25–23	
3 September	Belarus International: Host: Minsk, Belarus; Venue: Falcon Club; Level: Future Series; Prize: $5,000; Format: 32MS/32WS/32MD/32WD/32XD	(Azerbaijan) Ade Resky Dwicahyo	(France) Léo Rossi
3 September	Belarus International: Host: Minsk, Belarus; Venue: Falcon Club; Level: Future Series; Prize: $5,000; Format: 32MS/32WS/32MD/32WD/32XD	Score: 21–18, 15–21, 21–19	
3 September	Belarus International: Host: Minsk, Belarus; Venue: Falcon Club; Level: Future Series; Prize: $5,000; Format: 32MS/32WS/32MD/32WD/32XD	(France) Marie Batomene	(Russia) Anastasiia Semenova
3 September	Belarus International: Host: Minsk, Belarus; Venue: Falcon Club; Level: Future Series; Prize: $5,000; Format: 32MS/32WS/32MD/32WD/32XD	Score: 25–23, 21–15	
3 September	Belarus International: Host: Minsk, Belarus; Venue: Falcon Club; Level: Future Series; Prize: $5,000; Format: 32MS/32WS/32MD/32WD/32XD	(Azerbaijan) Ade Resky Dwicahyo (Azerbaijan) Azmy Qowimuramadhoni	(France) Thomas Baures (France) Léo Rossi
3 September	Belarus International: Host: Minsk, Belarus; Venue: Falcon Club; Level: Future Series; Prize: $5,000; Format: 32MS/32WS/32MD/32WD/32XD	Score: 21–18, 21–14	
3 September	Belarus International: Host: Minsk, Belarus; Venue: Falcon Club; Level: Future Series; Prize: $5,000; Format: 32MS/32WS/32MD/32WD/32XD	(Russia) Olga Arkhangelskaya (Russia) Elizaveta Tarasova	(Ukraine) Yuliya Kazarinova (Ukraine) Yevgeniya Paksyutova
3 September	Belarus International: Host: Minsk, Belarus; Venue: Falcon Club; Level: Future Series; Prize: $5,000; Format: 32MS/32WS/32MD/32WD/32XD	Score: 21–11, 21–13	
3 September	Belarus International: Host: Minsk, Belarus; Venue: Falcon Club; Level: Future Series; Prize: $5,000; Format: 32MS/32WS/32MD/32WD/32XD	(Poland) Robert Cybulski (Poland) Wiktoria Dąbczyńska	(Ukraine) Ivan Druzchenko (Ukraine) Yuliya Kazarinova
3 September	Belarus International: Host: Minsk, Belarus; Venue: Falcon Club; Level: Future Series; Prize: $5,000; Format: 32MS/32WS/32MD/32WD/32XD	Score: 15–21, 21–18, 22–20	
10 September	Japan Open (Draw): Host: Tokyo, Japan; Venue: Musashino Forest Sport Plaza; Level: Super 750; Prize: $700,000; Format: 32MS/32WS/32MD/32WD/32XD	(Japan) Kento Momota	(Thailand) Khosit Phetpradab
10 September	Japan Open (Draw): Host: Tokyo, Japan; Venue: Musashino Forest Sport Plaza; Level: Super 750; Prize: $700,000; Format: 32MS/32WS/32MD/32WD/32XD	Score: 21–14, 21–11	
10 September	Japan Open (Draw): Host: Tokyo, Japan; Venue: Musashino Forest Sport Plaza; Level: Super 750; Prize: $700,000; Format: 32MS/32WS/32MD/32WD/32XD	(Spain) Carolina Marín	(Japan) Nozomi Okuhara
10 September	Japan Open (Draw): Host: Tokyo, Japan; Venue: Musashino Forest Sport Plaza; Level: Super 750; Prize: $700,000; Format: 32MS/32WS/32MD/32WD/32XD	Score: 21–19, 17–21, 21–11	
10 September	Japan Open (Draw): Host: Tokyo, Japan; Venue: Musashino Forest Sport Plaza; Level: Super 750; Prize: $700,000; Format: 32MS/32WS/32MD/32WD/32XD	(Indonesia) Marcus Fernaldi Gideon (Indonesia) Kevin Sanjaya Sukamuljo	(China) Li Junhui (China) Liu Yuchen
10 September	Japan Open (Draw): Host: Tokyo, Japan; Venue: Musashino Forest Sport Plaza; Level: Super 750; Prize: $700,000; Format: 32MS/32WS/32MD/32WD/32XD	Score: 21–11, 21–13	
10 September	Japan Open (Draw): Host: Tokyo, Japan; Venue: Musashino Forest Sport Plaza; Level: Super 750; Prize: $700,000; Format: 32MS/32WS/32MD/32WD/32XD	(Japan) Yuki Fukushima (Japan) Sayaka Hirota	(China) Chen Qingchen (China) Jia Yifan
10 September	Japan Open (Draw): Host: Tokyo, Japan; Venue: Musashino Forest Sport Plaza; Level: Super 750; Prize: $700,000; Format: 32MS/32WS/32MD/32WD/32XD	Score: 21–15, 21-12	
10 September	Japan Open (Draw): Host: Tokyo, Japan; Venue: Musashino Forest Sport Plaza; Level: Super 750; Prize: $700,000; Format: 32MS/32WS/32MD/32WD/32XD	(China) Zheng Siwei (China) Huang Yaqiong	(China) Wang Yilyu (China) Huang Dongping
10 September	Japan Open (Draw): Host: Tokyo, Japan; Venue: Musashino Forest Sport Plaza; Level: Super 750; Prize: $700,000; Format: 32MS/32WS/32MD/32WD/32XD	Score: 21–19, 21–8	
10 September	Belgian International: Host: Leuven, Belgium; Venue: Sportoase; Level: International Challenge; Prize: $25,000; Format: 32MS/32WS/32MD/32WD/32XD	(England) Toby Penty	(Denmark) Victor Svendsen
10 September	Belgian International: Host: Leuven, Belgium; Venue: Sportoase; Level: International Challenge; Prize: $25,000; Format: 32MS/32WS/32MD/32WD/32XD	Score: 21–13, 19–21, 21–19	
10 September	Belgian International: Host: Leuven, Belgium; Venue: Sportoase; Level: International Challenge; Prize: $25,000; Format: 32MS/32WS/32MD/32WD/32XD	(Chinese Taipei) Lin Ying-chun	(India) Rituparna Das
10 September	Belgian International: Host: Leuven, Belgium; Venue: Sportoase; Level: International Challenge; Prize: $25,000; Format: 32MS/32WS/32MD/32WD/32XD	Score: 21–16, 21–16	
10 September	Belgian International: Host: Leuven, Belgium; Venue: Sportoase; Level: International Challenge; Prize: $25,000; Format: 32MS/32WS/32MD/32WD/32XD	(Netherlands) Jacco Arends (Netherlands) Ruben Jille	(Denmark) David Daugaard (Denmark) Frederik Søgaard
10 September	Belgian International: Host: Leuven, Belgium; Venue: Sportoase; Level: International Challenge; Prize: $25,000; Format: 32MS/32WS/32MD/32WD/32XD	Score: 11–21, 21–18, 21–17	
10 September	Belgian International: Host: Leuven, Belgium; Venue: Sportoase; Level: International Challenge; Prize: $25,000; Format: 32MS/32WS/32MD/32WD/32XD	(France) Delphine Delrue (France) Léa Palermo	(Japan) Mizuki Fujii (Japan) Nao Ono
10 September	Belgian International: Host: Leuven, Belgium; Venue: Sportoase; Level: International Challenge; Prize: $25,000; Format: 32MS/32WS/32MD/32WD/32XD	Score: 21–19, 21–14	
10 September	Belgian International: Host: Leuven, Belgium; Venue: Sportoase; Level: International Challenge; Prize: $25,000; Format: 32MS/32WS/32MD/32WD/32XD	(Netherlands) Jacco Arends (Netherlands) Selena Piek	(Scotland) Adam Hall (Scotland) Julie MacPherson
10 September	Belgian International: Host: Leuven, Belgium; Venue: Sportoase; Level: International Challenge; Prize: $25,000; Format: 32MS/32WS/32MD/32WD/32XD	Score: 21–11, 21–13	
10 September	South Australia International: Host: Adelaide, Australia; Venue: Titanium Arena; Level: International Challenge; Prize: $25,000; Format: 64MS/32WS/32MD/16WD/32XD	(Japan) Yu Igarashi	(Singapore) Loh Kean Yew
10 September	South Australia International: Host: Adelaide, Australia; Venue: Titanium Arena; Level: International Challenge; Prize: $25,000; Format: 64MS/32WS/32MD/16WD/32XD	Score: 21–19, 22–24, 21–11	
10 September	South Australia International: Host: Adelaide, Australia; Venue: Titanium Arena; Level: International Challenge; Prize: $25,000; Format: 64MS/32WS/32MD/16WD/32XD	(Japan) Natsuki Oie	(Japan) Ayumi Mine
10 September	South Australia International: Host: Adelaide, Australia; Venue: Titanium Arena; Level: International Challenge; Prize: $25,000; Format: 64MS/32WS/32MD/16WD/32XD	Score: 21–16, 10–21, 30–28	
10 September	South Australia International: Host: Adelaide, Australia; Venue: Titanium Arena; Level: International Challenge; Prize: $25,000; Format: 64MS/32WS/32MD/16WD/32XD	(Japan) Akira Koga (Japan) Taichi Saito	(Singapore) Danny Bawa Chrisnanta (Singapore) Terry Hee
10 September	South Australia International: Host: Adelaide, Australia; Venue: Titanium Arena; Level: International Challenge; Prize: $25,000; Format: 64MS/32WS/32MD/16WD/32XD	Score: 21–11, 19–21, 21–16	
10 September	South Australia International: Host: Adelaide, Australia; Venue: Titanium Arena; Level: International Challenge; Prize: $25,000; Format: 64MS/32WS/32MD/16WD/32XD	(Japan) Erina Honda (Japan) Nozomi Shimizu	(Chinese Taipei) Hung Yi-ting (Chinese Taipei) Tang Wan-yi
10 September	South Australia International: Host: Adelaide, Australia; Venue: Titanium Arena; Level: International Challenge; Prize: $25,000; Format: 64MS/32WS/32MD/16WD/32XD	Score: 21–16, 21–7	
10 September	South Australia International: Host: Adelaide, Australia; Venue: Titanium Arena; Level: International Challenge; Prize: $25,000; Format: 64MS/32WS/32MD/16WD/32XD	(Singapore) Terry Hee (Singapore) Citra Putri Sari Dewi	(Japan) Kohei Gondo (Japan) Ayane Kurihara
10 September	South Australia International: Host: Adelaide, Australia; Venue: Titanium Arena; Level: International Challenge; Prize: $25,000; Format: 64MS/32WS/32MD/16WD/32XD	Score: 22–20, 21–18	
17 September	China Open (Draw): Host: Changzhou, China; Venue: Changzhou Olympic Sports Centre; Level: Super 1000; Prize: $1,000,000; Format: 32MS/32WS/32MD/32WD/32XD	(Indonesia) Anthony Sinisuka Ginting	(Japan) Kento Momota
17 September	China Open (Draw): Host: Changzhou, China; Venue: Changzhou Olympic Sports Centre; Level: Super 1000; Prize: $1,000,000; Format: 32MS/32WS/32MD/32WD/32XD	Score: 23–21, 21–19	
17 September	China Open (Draw): Host: Changzhou, China; Venue: Changzhou Olympic Sports Centre; Level: Super 1000; Prize: $1,000,000; Format: 32MS/32WS/32MD/32WD/32XD	(Spain) Carolina Marín	(China) Chen Yufei
17 September	China Open (Draw): Host: Changzhou, China; Venue: Changzhou Olympic Sports Centre; Level: Super 1000; Prize: $1,000,000; Format: 32MS/32WS/32MD/32WD/32XD	Score: 21–18, 21–13	
17 September	China Open (Draw): Host: Changzhou, China; Venue: Changzhou Olympic Sports Centre; Level: Super 1000; Prize: $1,000,000; Format: 32MS/32WS/32MD/32WD/32XD	(Denmark) Kim Astrup (Denmark) Anders Skaarup Rasmussen	(China) Han Chengkai (China) Zhou Haodong
17 September	China Open (Draw): Host: Changzhou, China; Venue: Changzhou Olympic Sports Centre; Level: Super 1000; Prize: $1,000,000; Format: 32MS/32WS/32MD/32WD/32XD	Score: 21–13, 17–21, 21–14	
17 September	China Open (Draw): Host: Changzhou, China; Venue: Changzhou Olympic Sports Centre; Level: Super 1000; Prize: $1,000,000; Format: 32MS/32WS/32MD/32WD/32XD	(Japan) Misaki Matsutomo (Japan) Ayaka Takahashi	(Japan) Mayu Matsumoto (Japan) Wakana Nagahara
17 September	China Open (Draw): Host: Changzhou, China; Venue: Changzhou Olympic Sports Centre; Level: Super 1000; Prize: $1,000,000; Format: 32MS/32WS/32MD/32WD/32XD	Score: 21–16, 21–12	
17 September	China Open (Draw): Host: Changzhou, China; Venue: Changzhou Olympic Sports Centre; Level: Super 1000; Prize: $1,000,000; Format: 32MS/32WS/32MD/32WD/32XD	(China) Zheng Siwei (China) Huang Yaqiong	(China) Zhang Nan (China) Li Yinhui
17 September	China Open (Draw): Host: Changzhou, China; Venue: Changzhou Olympic Sports Centre; Level: Super 1000; Prize: $1,000,000; Format: 32MS/32WS/32MD/32WD/32XD	Score: 21–16, 21–9	
17 September	Bangka Belitung Indonesia Masters (Draw): Host: Pangkalpinang, Indonesia; Venue: Sahabudin Sports Hall; Level: Super 100; Prize: $75,000; Format: 64MS/32WS/32MD/32WD/32XD	(Indonesia) Ihsan Maulana Mustofa	(Chinese Taipei) Lin Yu-hsien
17 September	Bangka Belitung Indonesia Masters (Draw): Host: Pangkalpinang, Indonesia; Venue: Sahabudin Sports Hall; Level: Super 100; Prize: $75,000; Format: 64MS/32WS/32MD/32WD/32XD	Score: 21–17, 23–21	
17 September	Bangka Belitung Indonesia Masters (Draw): Host: Pangkalpinang, Indonesia; Venue: Sahabudin Sports Hall; Level: Super 100; Prize: $75,000; Format: 64MS/32WS/32MD/32WD/32XD	(Japan) Minatsu Mitani	(Japan) Shiori Saito
17 September	Bangka Belitung Indonesia Masters (Draw): Host: Pangkalpinang, Indonesia; Venue: Sahabudin Sports Hall; Level: Super 100; Prize: $75,000; Format: 64MS/32WS/32MD/32WD/32XD	Score: 21–16, 21–12	
17 September	Bangka Belitung Indonesia Masters (Draw): Host: Pangkalpinang, Indonesia; Venue: Sahabudin Sports Hall; Level: Super 100; Prize: $75,000; Format: 64MS/32WS/32MD/32WD/32XD	(Chinese Taipei) Chang Ko-chi (Chinese Taipei) Lu Chia-pin	(South Korea) Ko Sung-hyun (South Korea) Shin Baek-cheol
17 September	Bangka Belitung Indonesia Masters (Draw): Host: Pangkalpinang, Indonesia; Venue: Sahabudin Sports Hall; Level: Super 100; Prize: $75,000; Format: 64MS/32WS/32MD/32WD/32XD	Score: 23–21, 21–13	
17 September	Bangka Belitung Indonesia Masters (Draw): Host: Pangkalpinang, Indonesia; Venue: Sahabudin Sports Hall; Level: Super 100; Prize: $75,000; Format: 64MS/32WS/32MD/32WD/32XD	(Japan) Ayako Sakuramoto (Japan) Yukiko Takahata	(Japan) Nami Matsuyama (Japan) Chiharu Shida
17 September	Bangka Belitung Indonesia Masters (Draw): Host: Pangkalpinang, Indonesia; Venue: Sahabudin Sports Hall; Level: Super 100; Prize: $75,000; Format: 64MS/32WS/32MD/32WD/32XD	Score: 11–21, 21–19, 22–20	
17 September	Bangka Belitung Indonesia Masters (Draw): Host: Pangkalpinang, Indonesia; Venue: Sahabudin Sports Hall; Level: Super 100; Prize: $75,000; Format: 64MS/32WS/32MD/32WD/32XD	(Indonesia) Rinov Rivaldy (Indonesia) Pitha Haningtyas Mentari	(Thailand) Nipitphon Phuangphuapet (Thailand) Savitree Amitrapai
17 September	Bangka Belitung Indonesia Masters (Draw): Host: Pangkalpinang, Indonesia; Venue: Sahabudin Sports Hall; Level: Super 100; Prize: $75,000; Format: 64MS/32WS/32MD/32WD/32XD	Score: 21–19, 21–18	
17 September	Sydney International: Host: Sydney, Australia; Venue: Sydney Olympic Park Sports Hall; Level: International Series; Prize: $10,000; Format: 64MS/32WS/32MD/32WD/32XD	(Japan) Riichi Takeshita	(Malaysia) Soo Teck Zhi
17 September	Sydney International: Host: Sydney, Australia; Venue: Sydney Olympic Park Sports Hall; Level: International Series; Prize: $10,000; Format: 64MS/32WS/32MD/32WD/32XD	Score: 21–18, 21–11	
17 September	Sydney International: Host: Sydney, Australia; Venue: Sydney Olympic Park Sports Hall; Level: International Series; Prize: $10,000; Format: 64MS/32WS/32MD/32WD/32XD	(Japan) Ayumi Mine	(Chinese Taipei) Hung Yi-ting
17 September	Sydney International: Host: Sydney, Australia; Venue: Sydney Olympic Park Sports Hall; Level: International Series; Prize: $10,000; Format: 64MS/32WS/32MD/32WD/32XD	Score: 21–15, 21–10	
17 September	Sydney International: Host: Sydney, Australia; Venue: Sydney Olympic Park Sports Hall; Level: International Series; Prize: $10,000; Format: 64MS/32WS/32MD/32WD/32XD	(Japan) Hiroki Okamura (Japan) Masayuki Onodera	(Singapore) Danny Bawa Chrisnanta (Singapore) Terry Hee
17 September	Sydney International: Host: Sydney, Australia; Venue: Sydney Olympic Park Sports Hall; Level: International Series; Prize: $10,000; Format: 64MS/32WS/32MD/32WD/32XD	Score: 21–6, 21–11	
17 September	Sydney International: Host: Sydney, Australia; Venue: Sydney Olympic Park Sports Hall; Level: International Series; Prize: $10,000; Format: 64MS/32WS/32MD/32WD/32XD	(Chinese Taipei) Lee Chih-chen (Chinese Taipei) Liu Chiao-yun	(Chinese Taipei) Peng Li-ting (Chinese Taipei) Yu Chien-hui
17 September	Sydney International: Host: Sydney, Australia; Venue: Sydney Olympic Park Sports Hall; Level: International Series; Prize: $10,000; Format: 64MS/32WS/32MD/32WD/32XD	Score: 21–16, 23–21	
17 September	Sydney International: Host: Sydney, Australia; Venue: Sydney Olympic Park Sports Hall; Level: International Series; Prize: $10,000; Format: 64MS/32WS/32MD/32WD/32XD	(Japan) Tadayuki Urai (Japan) Rena Miyaura	(Singapore) Danny Bawa Chrisnanta (Singapore) Crystal Wong
17 September	Sydney International: Host: Sydney, Australia; Venue: Sydney Olympic Park Sports Hall; Level: International Series; Prize: $10,000; Format: 64MS/32WS/32MD/32WD/32XD	Score: 21–16, 21–17	
17 September	Mexico International: Host: Aguascalientes, Mexico; Venue: Gimnasio Olímpico de Ciudad Deportiva; Level: International Series; Prize: $10,000; Format: 32MS/32WS/32MD/32WD/32XD	(Guatemala) Kevin Cordón	(Belgium) Maxime Moreels
17 September	Mexico International: Host: Aguascalientes, Mexico; Venue: Gimnasio Olímpico de Ciudad Deportiva; Level: International Series; Prize: $10,000; Format: 32MS/32WS/32MD/32WD/32XD	Score: 21–19, 21–14	
17 September	Mexico International: Host: Aguascalientes, Mexico; Venue: Gimnasio Olímpico de Ciudad Deportiva; Level: International Series; Prize: $10,000; Format: 32MS/32WS/32MD/32WD/32XD	(Cuba) Taymara Oropesa	(United States) Jennie Gai
17 September	Mexico International: Host: Aguascalientes, Mexico; Venue: Gimnasio Olímpico de Ciudad Deportiva; Level: International Series; Prize: $10,000; Format: 32MS/32WS/32MD/32WD/32XD	Score: 13–21, 21–18, 21–19	
17 September	Mexico International: Host: Aguascalientes, Mexico; Venue: Gimnasio Olímpico de Ciudad Deportiva; Level: International Series; Prize: $10,000; Format: 32MS/32WS/32MD/32WD/32XD	(Brazil) Fabrício Farias (Brazil) Francielton Farias	(Mexico) Andrés López (Mexico) Luis Montoya
17 September	Mexico International: Host: Aguascalientes, Mexico; Venue: Gimnasio Olímpico de Ciudad Deportiva; Level: International Series; Prize: $10,000; Format: 32MS/32WS/32MD/32WD/32XD	Score: 21–15, 24–22	
17 September	Mexico International: Host: Aguascalientes, Mexico; Venue: Gimnasio Olímpico de Ciudad Deportiva; Level: International Series; Prize: $10,000; Format: 32MS/32WS/32MD/32WD/32XD	(Brazil) Lohaynny Vicente (Brazil) Luana Vicente	(Peru) Daniela Macías (Peru) Dánica Nishimura
17 September	Mexico International: Host: Aguascalientes, Mexico; Venue: Gimnasio Olímpico de Ciudad Deportiva; Level: International Series; Prize: $10,000; Format: 32MS/32WS/32MD/32WD/32XD	Score: 23–25, 21–16, 21–11	
17 September	Mexico International: Host: Aguascalientes, Mexico; Venue: Gimnasio Olímpico de Ciudad Deportiva; Level: International Series; Prize: $10,000; Format: 32MS/32WS/32MD/32WD/32XD	(India) Venkat Gaurav Prasad (India) Juhi Dewangan	(Mexico) Job Castillo (Mexico) Cynthia González
17 September	Mexico International: Host: Aguascalientes, Mexico; Venue: Gimnasio Olímpico de Ciudad Deportiva; Level: International Series; Prize: $10,000; Format: 32MS/32WS/32MD/32WD/32XD	Score: 18–21, 22–20, 21–15	
17 September	Polish International: Host: Bierun, Poland; Venue: Sports Hall; Level: International Series; Prize: $10,000; Format: 32MS/32WS/32MD/32WD/32XD	(Germany) Kai Schäfer	(India) Harsheel Dani
17 September	Polish International: Host: Bierun, Poland; Venue: Sports Hall; Level: International Series; Prize: $10,000; Format: 32MS/32WS/32MD/32WD/32XD	Score: 21–14, 20–22, 21–9	
17 September	Polish International: Host: Bierun, Poland; Venue: Sports Hall; Level: International Series; Prize: $10,000; Format: 32MS/32WS/32MD/32WD/32XD	(India) Rituparna Das	(India) Vrushali Gummadi
17 September	Polish International: Host: Bierun, Poland; Venue: Sports Hall; Level: International Series; Prize: $10,000; Format: 32MS/32WS/32MD/32WD/32XD	Score: 21–11, 21–14	
17 September	Polish International: Host: Bierun, Poland; Venue: Sports Hall; Level: International Series; Prize: $10,000; Format: 32MS/32WS/32MD/32WD/32XD	(Chinese Taipei) Lin Shang-kai (Chinese Taipei) Tseng Min-hao	(Poland) Miłosz Bochat (Poland) Adam Cwalina
17 September	Polish International: Host: Bierun, Poland; Venue: Sports Hall; Level: International Series; Prize: $10,000; Format: 32MS/32WS/32MD/32WD/32XD	Score: 21–13, 21–16	
17 September	Polish International: Host: Bierun, Poland; Venue: Sports Hall; Level: International Series; Prize: $10,000; Format: 32MS/32WS/32MD/32WD/32XD	(Japan) Mamiko Ishibashi (Japan) Mirai Shinoda	(Denmark) Emilie Furbo (Denmark) Trine Villadsen
17 September	Polish International: Host: Bierun, Poland; Venue: Sports Hall; Level: International Series; Prize: $10,000; Format: 32MS/32WS/32MD/32WD/32XD	Score: 22–20, 21–16	
17 September	Polish International: Host: Bierun, Poland; Venue: Sports Hall; Level: International Series; Prize: $10,000; Format: 32MS/32WS/32MD/32WD/32XD	(Czech Republic) Jakub Bitman (Czech Republic) Alžběta Bášová	(Poland) Paweł Śmiłowski (Poland) Magdalena Świerczyńska
17 September	Polish International: Host: Bierun, Poland; Venue: Sports Hall; Level: International Series; Prize: $10,000; Format: 32MS/32WS/32MD/32WD/32XD	Score: 21–17, 12–21, 21–14	
24 September	Korea Open (Draw): Host: Seoul, South Korea; Venue: SK Olympic Handball Gymnasium; Level: Super 500; Prize: $600,000; Format: 32MS/32WS/32MD/32WD/32XD	(Chinese Taipei) Chou Tien-chen	(Indonesia) Tommy Sugiarto
24 September	Korea Open (Draw): Host: Seoul, South Korea; Venue: SK Olympic Handball Gymnasium; Level: Super 500; Prize: $600,000; Format: 32MS/32WS/32MD/32WD/32XD	Score: 21–13, 21–16	
24 September	Korea Open (Draw): Host: Seoul, South Korea; Venue: SK Olympic Handball Gymnasium; Level: Super 500; Prize: $600,000; Format: 32MS/32WS/32MD/32WD/32XD	(Japan) Nozomi Okuhara	(United States) Beiwen Zhang
24 September	Korea Open (Draw): Host: Seoul, South Korea; Venue: SK Olympic Handball Gymnasium; Level: Super 500; Prize: $600,000; Format: 32MS/32WS/32MD/32WD/32XD	Score: 21–10, 17–21, 21–16	
24 September	Korea Open (Draw): Host: Seoul, South Korea; Venue: SK Olympic Handball Gymnasium; Level: Super 500; Prize: $600,000; Format: 32MS/32WS/32MD/32WD/32XD	(Japan) Hiroyuki Endo (Japan) Yuta Watanabe	(Japan) Takuro Hoki (Japan) Yugo Kobayashi
24 September	Korea Open (Draw): Host: Seoul, South Korea; Venue: SK Olympic Handball Gymnasium; Level: Super 500; Prize: $600,000; Format: 32MS/32WS/32MD/32WD/32XD	Score: 9–21, 21–15, 21–10	
24 September	Korea Open (Draw): Host: Seoul, South Korea; Venue: SK Olympic Handball Gymnasium; Level: Super 500; Prize: $600,000; Format: 32MS/32WS/32MD/32WD/32XD	(Japan) Misaki Matsutomo (Japan) Ayaka Takahashi	(Japan) Yuki Fukushima (Japan) Sayaka Hirota
24 September	Korea Open (Draw): Host: Seoul, South Korea; Venue: SK Olympic Handball Gymnasium; Level: Super 500; Prize: $600,000; Format: 32MS/32WS/32MD/32WD/32XD	Score: 21–11, 21–18	
24 September	Korea Open (Draw): Host: Seoul, South Korea; Venue: SK Olympic Handball Gymnasium; Level: Super 500; Prize: $600,000; Format: 32MS/32WS/32MD/32WD/32XD	(China) He Jiting (China) Du Yue	(Denmark) Mathias Christiansen (Denmark) Christinna Pedersen
24 September	Korea Open (Draw): Host: Seoul, South Korea; Venue: SK Olympic Handball Gymnasium; Level: Super 500; Prize: $600,000; Format: 32MS/32WS/32MD/32WD/32XD	Score: 21–18, 21–16	
24 September	Czech Open: Host: Brno, Czech Republic; Venue: Sportovní hala Vodova; Level: International Challenge; Prize: $25,000; Format: 32MS/32WS/32MD/32WD/32XD	(France) Toma Junior Popov	(Denmark) Victor Svendsen
24 September	Czech Open: Host: Brno, Czech Republic; Venue: Sportovní hala Vodova; Level: International Challenge; Prize: $25,000; Format: 32MS/32WS/32MD/32WD/32XD	Score: 21–16, 21–11	
24 September	Czech Open: Host: Brno, Czech Republic; Venue: Sportovní hala Vodova; Level: International Challenge; Prize: $25,000; Format: 32MS/32WS/32MD/32WD/32XD	(Germany) Yvonne Li	(Turkey) Neslihan Yiğit
24 September	Czech Open: Host: Brno, Czech Republic; Venue: Sportovní hala Vodova; Level: International Challenge; Prize: $25,000; Format: 32MS/32WS/32MD/32WD/32XD	Score: 21–17, 21–8	
24 September	Czech Open: Host: Brno, Czech Republic; Venue: Sportovní hala Vodova; Level: International Challenge; Prize: $25,000; Format: 32MS/32WS/32MD/32WD/32XD	(France) Thom Gicquel (France) Ronan Labar	(Poland) Miłosz Bochat (Poland) Adam Cwalina
24 September	Czech Open: Host: Brno, Czech Republic; Venue: Sportovní hala Vodova; Level: International Challenge; Prize: $25,000; Format: 32MS/32WS/32MD/32WD/32XD	Score: 21–18, 17–21, 21–15	
24 September	Czech Open: Host: Brno, Czech Republic; Venue: Sportovní hala Vodova; Level: International Challenge; Prize: $25,000; Format: 32MS/32WS/32MD/32WD/32XD	(England) Chloe Birch (England) Lauren Smith	(France) Émilie Lefel (France) Anne Tran
24 September	Czech Open: Host: Brno, Czech Republic; Venue: Sportovní hala Vodova; Level: International Challenge; Prize: $25,000; Format: 32MS/32WS/32MD/32WD/32XD	Score: 21–14, 21–14	
24 September	Czech Open: Host: Brno, Czech Republic; Venue: Sportovní hala Vodova; Level: International Challenge; Prize: $25,000; Format: 32MS/32WS/32MD/32WD/32XD	(France) Ronan Labar (France) Audrey Fontaine	(Denmark) Jeppe Bay (Denmark) Ditte Søby
24 September	Czech Open: Host: Brno, Czech Republic; Venue: Sportovní hala Vodova; Level: International Challenge; Prize: $25,000; Format: 32MS/32WS/32MD/32WD/32XD	Score: 21–10, 12–21, 21–13	
24 September	Guatemala International: Host: Guatemala City, Guatemala; Venue: Gimnasio Teodoro Palacios Flores; Level: International Series; Prize: $10,000; Format: 32MS/32WS/32MD/16WD/32XD	(Guatemala) Kevin Cordón	(United States) Timothy Lam
24 September	Guatemala International: Host: Guatemala City, Guatemala; Venue: Gimnasio Teodoro Palacios Flores; Level: International Series; Prize: $10,000; Format: 32MS/32WS/32MD/16WD/32XD	Score: 21–12, 21–13	
24 September	Guatemala International: Host: Guatemala City, Guatemala; Venue: Gimnasio Teodoro Palacios Flores; Level: International Series; Prize: $10,000; Format: 32MS/32WS/32MD/16WD/32XD	(Canada) Talia Ng	(Canada) Katie Ho-Shue
24 September	Guatemala International: Host: Guatemala City, Guatemala; Venue: Gimnasio Teodoro Palacios Flores; Level: International Series; Prize: $10,000; Format: 32MS/32WS/32MD/16WD/32XD	Score: 21–14, 21–16	
24 September	Guatemala International: Host: Guatemala City, Guatemala; Venue: Gimnasio Teodoro Palacios Flores; Level: International Series; Prize: $10,000; Format: 32MS/32WS/32MD/16WD/32XD	(Guatemala) Rubén Castellanos (Guatemala) Aníbal Marroquín	(Cuba) Osleni Guerrero (Cuba) Leodannis Martínez
24 September	Guatemala International: Host: Guatemala City, Guatemala; Venue: Gimnasio Teodoro Palacios Flores; Level: International Series; Prize: $10,000; Format: 32MS/32WS/32MD/16WD/32XD	Score: 21–12, 21–17	
24 September	Guatemala International: Host: Guatemala City, Guatemala; Venue: Gimnasio Teodoro Palacios Flores; Level: International Series; Prize: $10,000; Format: 32MS/32WS/32MD/16WD/32XD	(Canada) Talia Ng (Canada) Josephine Wu	(Canada) Eliana Zhang (Canada) Wendy Zhang
24 September	Guatemala International: Host: Guatemala City, Guatemala; Venue: Gimnasio Teodoro Palacios Flores; Level: International Series; Prize: $10,000; Format: 32MS/32WS/32MD/16WD/32XD	Score: 14–21, 21–17, 21–10	
24 September	Guatemala International: Host: Guatemala City, Guatemala; Venue: Gimnasio Teodoro Palacios Flores; Level: International Series; Prize: $10,000; Format: 32MS/32WS/32MD/16WD/32XD	(Canada) Joshua Hurlburt-Yu (Canada) Josephine Wu	(Cuba) Leodannis Martínez (Cuba) Taymara Oropesa
24 September	Guatemala International: Host: Guatemala City, Guatemala; Venue: Gimnasio Teodoro Palacios Flores; Level: International Series; Prize: $10,000; Format: 32MS/32WS/32MD/16WD/32XD	Score: 21–12, 21–18	

=== October ===
Week commencing	Tournament	Champions	Runners-up
1 October	Chinese Taipei Open (Draw): Host: Taipei, Chinese Taipei; Venue: Taipei Arena; Level: Super 300; Prize: $500,000; Format: 32MS/32WS/32MD/32WD/32XD	(Malaysia) Lee Zii Jia	(Japan) Riichi Takeshita
1 October	Chinese Taipei Open (Draw): Host: Taipei, Chinese Taipei; Venue: Taipei Arena; Level: Super 300; Prize: $500,000; Format: 32MS/32WS/32MD/32WD/32XD	Score: 21–17, 16–21, 21–11	
1 October	Chinese Taipei Open (Draw): Host: Taipei, Chinese Taipei; Venue: Taipei Arena; Level: Super 300; Prize: $500,000; Format: 32MS/32WS/32MD/32WD/32XD	(Chinese Taipei) Tai Tzu-ying	(Denmark) Line Kjærsfeldt
1 October	Chinese Taipei Open (Draw): Host: Taipei, Chinese Taipei; Venue: Taipei Arena; Level: Super 300; Prize: $500,000; Format: 32MS/32WS/32MD/32WD/32XD	Score: 17–21, 21–10, 21–13	
1 October	Chinese Taipei Open (Draw): Host: Taipei, Chinese Taipei; Venue: Taipei Arena; Level: Super 300; Prize: $500,000; Format: 32MS/32WS/32MD/32WD/32XD	(Chinese Taipei) Chen Hung-ling (Chinese Taipei) Wang Chi-lin	(Chinese Taipei) Liao Min-chun (Chinese Taipei) Su Ching-heng
1 October	Chinese Taipei Open (Draw): Host: Taipei, Chinese Taipei; Venue: Taipei Arena; Level: Super 300; Prize: $500,000; Format: 32MS/32WS/32MD/32WD/32XD	Score: 22–20, 21–9	
1 October	Chinese Taipei Open (Draw): Host: Taipei, Chinese Taipei; Venue: Taipei Arena; Level: Super 300; Prize: $500,000; Format: 32MS/32WS/32MD/32WD/32XD	(Japan) Nami Matsuyama (Japan) Chiharu Shida	(Japan) Ayane Kurihara (Japan) Naru Shinoya
1 October	Chinese Taipei Open (Draw): Host: Taipei, Chinese Taipei; Venue: Taipei Arena; Level: Super 300; Prize: $500,000; Format: 32MS/32WS/32MD/32WD/32XD	Score: 21–10, 21–17	
1 October	Chinese Taipei Open (Draw): Host: Taipei, Chinese Taipei; Venue: Taipei Arena; Level: Super 300; Prize: $500,000; Format: 32MS/32WS/32MD/32WD/32XD	(Indonesia) Alfian Eko Prasetya (Indonesia) Marsheilla Gischa Islami	(Chinese Taipei) Yang Po-hsuan (Chinese Taipei) Wu Ti-jung
1 October	Chinese Taipei Open (Draw): Host: Taipei, Chinese Taipei; Venue: Taipei Arena; Level: Super 300; Prize: $500,000; Format: 32MS/32WS/32MD/32WD/32XD	Score: 21–15, 21–11	
1 October	Bulgarian International: Host: Sofia, Bulgaria; Venue: Badminton Hall Europe; Level: Future Series; Prize: TBC; Format: 32MS/32WS/32MD/32WD/32XD	(Sweden) Albin Hjelm	(Ukraine) Kyrylo Leonov
1 October	Bulgarian International: Host: Sofia, Bulgaria; Venue: Badminton Hall Europe; Level: Future Series; Prize: TBC; Format: 32MS/32WS/32MD/32WD/32XD	Score: 21–17, 13–21, 21–19	
1 October	Bulgarian International: Host: Sofia, Bulgaria; Venue: Badminton Hall Europe; Level: Future Series; Prize: TBC; Format: 32MS/32WS/32MD/32WD/32XD	(Spain) Sara Peñalver	(India) Aakarshi Kashyap
1 October	Bulgarian International: Host: Sofia, Bulgaria; Venue: Badminton Hall Europe; Level: Future Series; Prize: TBC; Format: 32MS/32WS/32MD/32WD/32XD	Score: 21–19, 21–11	
1 October	Bulgarian International: Host: Sofia, Bulgaria; Venue: Badminton Hall Europe; Level: Future Series; Prize: TBC; Format: 32MS/32WS/32MD/32WD/32XD	(Czech Republic) Jaromír Janáček (Czech Republic) Tomáš Švejda	(Bulgaria) Ivan Rusev (Bulgaria) Alex Vlaar
1 October	Bulgarian International: Host: Sofia, Bulgaria; Venue: Badminton Hall Europe; Level: Future Series; Prize: TBC; Format: 32MS/32WS/32MD/32WD/32XD	Score: 21–19, 21–14	
1 October	Bulgarian International: Host: Sofia, Bulgaria; Venue: Badminton Hall Europe; Level: Future Series; Prize: TBC; Format: 32MS/32WS/32MD/32WD/32XD	(Sweden) Moa Sjöö (Sweden) Tilda Sjöö	(Republic of Ireland) Kate Frost (Republic of Ireland) Moya Ryan
1 October	Bulgarian International: Host: Sofia, Bulgaria; Venue: Badminton Hall Europe; Level: Future Series; Prize: TBC; Format: 32MS/32WS/32MD/32WD/32XD	Score: 21–11, 21–12	
1 October	Bulgarian International: Host: Sofia, Bulgaria; Venue: Badminton Hall Europe; Level: Future Series; Prize: TBC; Format: 32MS/32WS/32MD/32WD/32XD	(Bulgaria) Alex Vlaar (Bulgaria) Mariya Mitsova	(India) Ashith Surya (India) Pranjal Prabhu Chimulkar
1 October	Bulgarian International: Host: Sofia, Bulgaria; Venue: Badminton Hall Europe; Level: Future Series; Prize: TBC; Format: 32MS/32WS/32MD/32WD/32XD	Score: 21–15, 21–10	
8 October	Dutch Open (Draw): Host: Almere, Netherlands; Venue: Topsportcentrum; Level: Super 100; Prize: $75,000; Format: 64MS/32WS/32MD/32WD/32XD	(India) Sourabh Verma	(Malaysia) Cheam June Wei
8 October	Dutch Open (Draw): Host: Almere, Netherlands; Venue: Topsportcentrum; Level: Super 100; Prize: $75,000; Format: 64MS/32WS/32MD/32WD/32XD	Score: 21–19, 21–13	
8 October	Dutch Open (Draw): Host: Almere, Netherlands; Venue: Topsportcentrum; Level: Super 100; Prize: $75,000; Format: 64MS/32WS/32MD/32WD/32XD	(Denmark) Mia Blichfeldt	(China) Qi Xuefei
8 October	Dutch Open (Draw): Host: Almere, Netherlands; Venue: Topsportcentrum; Level: Super 100; Prize: $75,000; Format: 64MS/32WS/32MD/32WD/32XD	Score: 21–16, 21–18	
8 October	Dutch Open (Draw): Host: Almere, Netherlands; Venue: Topsportcentrum; Level: Super 100; Prize: $75,000; Format: 64MS/32WS/32MD/32WD/32XD	(Indonesia) Wahyu Nayaka (Indonesia) Ade Yusuf	(Netherlands) Jelle Maas (Netherlands) Robin Tabeling
8 October	Dutch Open (Draw): Host: Almere, Netherlands; Venue: Topsportcentrum; Level: Super 100; Prize: $75,000; Format: 64MS/32WS/32MD/32WD/32XD	Score: 21–19, 17–21, 21–11	
8 October	Dutch Open (Draw): Host: Almere, Netherlands; Venue: Topsportcentrum; Level: Super 100; Prize: $75,000; Format: 64MS/32WS/32MD/32WD/32XD	(Bulgaria) Gabriela Stoeva (Bulgaria) Stefani Stoeva	(Netherlands) Selena Piek (Netherlands) Cheryl Seinen
8 October	Dutch Open (Draw): Host: Almere, Netherlands; Venue: Topsportcentrum; Level: Super 100; Prize: $75,000; Format: 64MS/32WS/32MD/32WD/32XD	Score: 21–17, 21–18	
8 October	Dutch Open (Draw): Host: Almere, Netherlands; Venue: Topsportcentrum; Level: Super 100; Prize: $75,000; Format: 64MS/32WS/32MD/32WD/32XD	(England) Marcus Ellis (England) Lauren Smith	(France) Thom Gicquel (France) Delphine Delrue
8 October	Dutch Open (Draw): Host: Almere, Netherlands; Venue: Topsportcentrum; Level: Super 100; Prize: $75,000; Format: 64MS/32WS/32MD/32WD/32XD	Score: 21–15, 21–15	
15 October	Denmark Open (Draw): Host: Odense, Denmark; Venue: Odense Sports Park; Level: Super 750; Prize: $775,000; Format: 32MS/32WS/32MD/32WD/32XD	(Japan) Kento Momota	(Chinese Taipei) Chou Tien-chen
15 October	Denmark Open (Draw): Host: Odense, Denmark; Venue: Odense Sports Park; Level: Super 750; Prize: $775,000; Format: 32MS/32WS/32MD/32WD/32XD	Score: 22–20, 16–21, 21–16	
15 October	Denmark Open (Draw): Host: Odense, Denmark; Venue: Odense Sports Park; Level: Super 750; Prize: $775,000; Format: 32MS/32WS/32MD/32WD/32XD	(Chinese Taipei) Tai Tzu-ying	(India) Saina Nehwal
15 October	Denmark Open (Draw): Host: Odense, Denmark; Venue: Odense Sports Park; Level: Super 750; Prize: $775,000; Format: 32MS/32WS/32MD/32WD/32XD	Score: 21–13, 13–21, 21–6	
15 October	Denmark Open (Draw): Host: Odense, Denmark; Venue: Odense Sports Park; Level: Super 750; Prize: $775,000; Format: 32MS/32WS/32MD/32WD/32XD	(Indonesia) Marcus Fernaldi Gideon (Indonesia) Kevin Sanjaya Sukamuljo	(Japan) Takeshi Kamura (Japan) Keigo Sonoda
15 October	Denmark Open (Draw): Host: Odense, Denmark; Venue: Odense Sports Park; Level: Super 750; Prize: $775,000; Format: 32MS/32WS/32MD/32WD/32XD	Score: 21–15, 21–16	
15 October	Denmark Open (Draw): Host: Odense, Denmark; Venue: Odense Sports Park; Level: Super 750; Prize: $775,000; Format: 32MS/32WS/32MD/32WD/32XD	(Japan) Yuki Fukushima (Japan) Sayaka Hirota	(Japan) Shiho Tanaka (Japan) Koharu Yonemoto
15 October	Denmark Open (Draw): Host: Odense, Denmark; Venue: Odense Sports Park; Level: Super 750; Prize: $775,000; Format: 32MS/32WS/32MD/32WD/32XD	Score: 21–19, 21–16	
15 October	Denmark Open (Draw): Host: Odense, Denmark; Venue: Odense Sports Park; Level: Super 750; Prize: $775,000; Format: 32MS/32WS/32MD/32WD/32XD	(China) Zheng Siwei (China) Huang Yaqiong	(Thailand) Dechapol Puavaranukroh (Thailand) Sapsiree Taerattanachai
15 October	Denmark Open (Draw): Host: Odense, Denmark; Venue: Odense Sports Park; Level: Super 750; Prize: $775,000; Format: 32MS/32WS/32MD/32WD/32XD	Score: 21–16, 21–13	
15 October	Singapore International: Host: Singapore; Venue: Singapore Badminton Hall; Level: International Series; Prize: $10,000; Format: 32MS/32WS/32MD/32WD/32XD	(Indonesia) Krishna Adi Nugraha	(Hong Kong) Lee Cheuk Yiu
15 October	Singapore International: Host: Singapore; Venue: Singapore Badminton Hall; Level: International Series; Prize: $10,000; Format: 32MS/32WS/32MD/32WD/32XD	Score: 21–12, 21–12	
15 October	Singapore International: Host: Singapore; Venue: Singapore Badminton Hall; Level: International Series; Prize: $10,000; Format: 32MS/32WS/32MD/32WD/32XD	(Indonesia) Choirunnisa	(Indonesia) Aurum Oktavia Winata
15 October	Singapore International: Host: Singapore; Venue: Singapore Badminton Hall; Level: International Series; Prize: $10,000; Format: 32MS/32WS/32MD/32WD/32XD	Score: 21–14, 21–15	
15 October	Singapore International: Host: Singapore; Venue: Singapore Badminton Hall; Level: International Series; Prize: $10,000; Format: 32MS/32WS/32MD/32WD/32XD	(Hong Kong) Yonny Chung (Hong Kong) Tam Chun Hei	(Singapore) Danny Bawa Chrisnanta (Singapore) Terry Hee
15 October	Singapore International: Host: Singapore; Venue: Singapore Badminton Hall; Level: International Series; Prize: $10,000; Format: 32MS/32WS/32MD/32WD/32XD	Score: 13–21, 21–18, 21–19	
15 October	Singapore International: Host: Singapore; Venue: Singapore Badminton Hall; Level: International Series; Prize: $10,000; Format: 32MS/32WS/32MD/32WD/32XD	(Hong Kong) Ng Tsz Yau (Hong Kong) Yuen Sin Ying	(Hong Kong) Ng Wing Yung (Hong Kong) Yeung Nga Ting
15 October	Singapore International: Host: Singapore; Venue: Singapore Badminton Hall; Level: International Series; Prize: $10,000; Format: 32MS/32WS/32MD/32WD/32XD	Score: 21–17, 21–17	
15 October	Singapore International: Host: Singapore; Venue: Singapore Badminton Hall; Level: International Series; Prize: $10,000; Format: 32MS/32WS/32MD/32WD/32XD	(Hong Kong) Yeung Ming Nok (Hong Kong) Ng Tsz Yau	(Indonesia) Adnan Maulana (Indonesia) Masita Mahmudin
15 October	Singapore International: Host: Singapore; Venue: Singapore Badminton Hall; Level: International Series; Prize: $10,000; Format: 32MS/32WS/32MD/32WD/32XD	Score: 19–21, 21–7, 21–18	
15 October	Hellas Open: Host: Chania, Greece; Venue: Indoor Hall Kladisos; Level: International Series; Prize: $10,000; Format: 32MS/32WS/32MD/32WD/32XD	(Poland) Adrian Dziółko	(France) Léo Rossi
15 October	Hellas Open: Host: Chania, Greece; Venue: Indoor Hall Kladisos; Level: International Series; Prize: $10,000; Format: 32MS/32WS/32MD/32WD/32XD	Score: 21–11, 19–21, 21–19	
15 October	Hellas Open: Host: Chania, Greece; Venue: Indoor Hall Kladisos; Level: International Series; Prize: $10,000; Format: 32MS/32WS/32MD/32WD/32XD	(Germany) Luise Heim	(Hungary) Laura Sárosi
15 October	Hellas Open: Host: Chania, Greece; Venue: Indoor Hall Kladisos; Level: International Series; Prize: $10,000; Format: 32MS/32WS/32MD/32WD/32XD	Score: 21–9, 21–11	
15 October	Hellas Open: Host: Chania, Greece; Venue: Indoor Hall Kladisos; Level: International Series; Prize: $10,000; Format: 32MS/32WS/32MD/32WD/32XD	(India) Arjun M. R. (India) Ramchandran Shlok	(Poland) Adrian Dziółko (Poland) Michał Rogalski
15 October	Hellas Open: Host: Chania, Greece; Venue: Indoor Hall Kladisos; Level: International Series; Prize: $10,000; Format: 32MS/32WS/32MD/32WD/32XD	Score: 21–13, 21–11	
15 October	Hellas Open: Host: Chania, Greece; Venue: Indoor Hall Kladisos; Level: International Series; Prize: $10,000; Format: 32MS/32WS/32MD/32WD/32XD	(India) Rutaparna Panda (India) Arathi Sara Sunil	(France) Vimala Hériau (France) Margot Lambert
15 October	Hellas Open: Host: Chania, Greece; Venue: Indoor Hall Kladisos; Level: International Series; Prize: $10,000; Format: 32MS/32WS/32MD/32WD/32XD	Score: 21–19, 21–12	
15 October	Hellas Open: Host: Chania, Greece; Venue: Indoor Hall Kladisos; Level: International Series; Prize: $10,000; Format: 32MS/32WS/32MD/32WD/32XD	(India) Arjun M. R. (India) Maneesha Kukkapalli	(Poland) Paweł Pietryja (Poland) Agnieszka Wojtkowska
15 October	Hellas Open: Host: Chania, Greece; Venue: Indoor Hall Kladisos; Level: International Series; Prize: $10,000; Format: 32MS/32WS/32MD/32WD/32XD	Score: 21–15, 21–14	
22 October	French Open (Draw): Host: Paris, France; Venue: Stade Pierre de Coubertin; Level: Super 750; Prize: $750,000; Format: 32MS/32WS/32MD/32WD/32XD	(China) Chen Long	(China) Shi Yuqi
22 October	French Open (Draw): Host: Paris, France; Venue: Stade Pierre de Coubertin; Level: Super 750; Prize: $750,000; Format: 32MS/32WS/32MD/32WD/32XD	Score: 21–17, 21–19	
22 October	French Open (Draw): Host: Paris, France; Venue: Stade Pierre de Coubertin; Level: Super 750; Prize: $750,000; Format: 32MS/32WS/32MD/32WD/32XD	(Japan) Akane Yamaguchi	(Chinese Taipei) Tai Tzu-ying
22 October	French Open (Draw): Host: Paris, France; Venue: Stade Pierre de Coubertin; Level: Super 750; Prize: $750,000; Format: 32MS/32WS/32MD/32WD/32XD	Score: 22–20, 17–21, 21–13	
22 October	French Open (Draw): Host: Paris, France; Venue: Stade Pierre de Coubertin; Level: Super 750; Prize: $750,000; Format: 32MS/32WS/32MD/32WD/32XD	(China) Han Chengkai (China) Zhou Haodong	(Indonesia) Marcus Fernaldi Gideon (Indonesia) Kevin Sanjaya Sukamuljo
22 October	French Open (Draw): Host: Paris, France; Venue: Stade Pierre de Coubertin; Level: Super 750; Prize: $750,000; Format: 32MS/32WS/32MD/32WD/32XD	Score: 23–21, 8–21, 21–17	
22 October	French Open (Draw): Host: Paris, France; Venue: Stade Pierre de Coubertin; Level: Super 750; Prize: $750,000; Format: 32MS/32WS/32MD/32WD/32XD	(Japan) Mayu Matsumoto (Japan) Wakana Nagahara	(Bulgaria) Gabriela Stoeva (Bulgaria) Stefani Stoeva
22 October	French Open (Draw): Host: Paris, France; Venue: Stade Pierre de Coubertin; Level: Super 750; Prize: $750,000; Format: 32MS/32WS/32MD/32WD/32XD	Score: 21–14, 21–19	
22 October	French Open (Draw): Host: Paris, France; Venue: Stade Pierre de Coubertin; Level: Super 750; Prize: $750,000; Format: 32MS/32WS/32MD/32WD/32XD	(China) Zheng Siwei (China) Huang Yaqiong	(South Korea) Seo Seung-jae (South Korea) Chae Yoo-jung
22 October	French Open (Draw): Host: Paris, France; Venue: Stade Pierre de Coubertin; Level: Super 750; Prize: $750,000; Format: 32MS/32WS/32MD/32WD/32XD	Score: 21–19, 21–14	
22 October	Indonesia International: Host: Surabaya, Indonesia; Venue: Sudirman Sports Hall; Level: International Challenge; Prize: $25,000; Format: 64MS/32WS/32MD/32WD/32XD	(Indonesia) Chico Aura Dwi Wardoyo	(Indonesia) Sony Dwi Kuncoro
22 October	Indonesia International: Host: Surabaya, Indonesia; Venue: Sudirman Sports Hall; Level: International Challenge; Prize: $25,000; Format: 64MS/32WS/32MD/32WD/32XD	Score: 21–15, 21–9	
22 October	Indonesia International: Host: Surabaya, Indonesia; Venue: Sudirman Sports Hall; Level: International Challenge; Prize: $25,000; Format: 64MS/32WS/32MD/32WD/32XD	(Japan) Shiori Saito	(South Korea) An Se-young
22 October	Indonesia International: Host: Surabaya, Indonesia; Venue: Sudirman Sports Hall; Level: International Challenge; Prize: $25,000; Format: 64MS/32WS/32MD/32WD/32XD	Score: 21–12, 21–13	
22 October	Indonesia International: Host: Surabaya, Indonesia; Venue: Sudirman Sports Hall; Level: International Challenge; Prize: $25,000; Format: 64MS/32WS/32MD/32WD/32XD	(Indonesia) Sabar Karyaman Gutama (Indonesia) Frengky Wijaya Putra	(Indonesia) Muhammad Shohibul Fikri (Indonesia) Bagas Maulana
22 October	Indonesia International: Host: Surabaya, Indonesia; Venue: Sudirman Sports Hall; Level: International Challenge; Prize: $25,000; Format: 64MS/32WS/32MD/32WD/32XD	Score: 21–16, 21–15	
22 October	Indonesia International: Host: Surabaya, Indonesia; Venue: Sudirman Sports Hall; Level: International Challenge; Prize: $25,000; Format: 64MS/32WS/32MD/32WD/32XD	(Indonesia) Tania Oktaviani Kusumah (Indonesia) Vania Arianti Sukoco	(Japan) Miki Kashihara (Japan) Miyuki Kato
22 October	Indonesia International: Host: Surabaya, Indonesia; Venue: Sudirman Sports Hall; Level: International Challenge; Prize: $25,000; Format: 64MS/32WS/32MD/32WD/32XD	Score: 20–22, 21–11, 21–11	
22 October	Indonesia International: Host: Surabaya, Indonesia; Venue: Sudirman Sports Hall; Level: International Challenge; Prize: $25,000; Format: 64MS/32WS/32MD/32WD/32XD	(Japan) Kohei Gondo (Japan) Ayane Kurihara	(Indonesia) Adnan Maulana (Indonesia) Shella Devi Aulia
22 October	Indonesia International: Host: Surabaya, Indonesia; Venue: Sudirman Sports Hall; Level: International Challenge; Prize: $25,000; Format: 64MS/32WS/32MD/32WD/32XD	Score: 21–17, 23–21	
22 October	Santo Domingo Open: Host: Santo Domingo, Dominican Republic; Venue: Palacio De Los Deportes; Level: International Series; Prize: $10,000; Format: 32MS/32WS/16MD/16WD/32XD	(Cuba) Osleni Guerrero	(Italy) Rosario Maddaloni
22 October	Santo Domingo Open: Host: Santo Domingo, Dominican Republic; Venue: Palacio De Los Deportes; Level: International Series; Prize: $10,000; Format: 32MS/32WS/16MD/16WD/32XD	Score: 21–13, 19–21, 21–18	
22 October	Santo Domingo Open: Host: Santo Domingo, Dominican Republic; Venue: Palacio De Los Deportes; Level: International Series; Prize: $10,000; Format: 32MS/32WS/16MD/16WD/32XD	(Brazil) Fabiana Silva	(Cuba) Taymara Oropesa
22 October	Santo Domingo Open: Host: Santo Domingo, Dominican Republic; Venue: Palacio De Los Deportes; Level: International Series; Prize: $10,000; Format: 32MS/32WS/16MD/16WD/32XD	Score: 21–19, 14–21, 21–13	
22 October	Santo Domingo Open: Host: Santo Domingo, Dominican Republic; Venue: Palacio De Los Deportes; Level: International Series; Prize: $10,000; Format: 32MS/32WS/16MD/16WD/32XD	(Canada) Joshua Hurlburt-Yu (Canada) Duncan Yao	(Guatemala) Rodolfo Ramírez (Guatemala) Jonathan Solís
22 October	Santo Domingo Open: Host: Santo Domingo, Dominican Republic; Venue: Palacio De Los Deportes; Level: International Series; Prize: $10,000; Format: 32MS/32WS/16MD/16WD/32XD	Score: 21–19, 16–21, 21–17	
22 October	Santo Domingo Open: Host: Santo Domingo, Dominican Republic; Venue: Palacio De Los Deportes; Level: International Series; Prize: $10,000; Format: 32MS/32WS/16MD/16WD/32XD	(Brazil) Lohaynny Vicente (Brazil) Luana Vicente	(Guatemala) Diana Corleto (Guatemala) Nikté Sotomayor
22 October	Santo Domingo Open: Host: Santo Domingo, Dominican Republic; Venue: Palacio De Los Deportes; Level: International Series; Prize: $10,000; Format: 32MS/32WS/16MD/16WD/32XD	Score: 22–20, 21–17	
22 October	Santo Domingo Open: Host: Santo Domingo, Dominican Republic; Venue: Palacio De Los Deportes; Level: International Series; Prize: $10,000; Format: 32MS/32WS/16MD/16WD/32XD	(Canada) Joshua Hurlburt-Yu (Canada) Josephine Wu	(Brazil) Fabrício Farias (Brazil) Jaqueline Lima
22 October	Santo Domingo Open: Host: Santo Domingo, Dominican Republic; Venue: Palacio De Los Deportes; Level: International Series; Prize: $10,000; Format: 32MS/32WS/16MD/16WD/32XD	Score: 21–17, 16–21, 22–20	
22 October	Egypt International: Host: Cairo, Egypt; Venue: Cairo Stadium Hall No. 2; Level: International Series; Prize: $10,000; Format: 32MS/32WS/32MD/32WD/64XD	(Azerbaijan) Ade Resky Dwicahyo	(Hungary) Gergely Krausz
22 October	Egypt International: Host: Cairo, Egypt; Venue: Cairo Stadium Hall No. 2; Level: International Series; Prize: $10,000; Format: 32MS/32WS/32MD/32WD/64XD	Score: 21–16, 21–16	
22 October	Egypt International: Host: Cairo, Egypt; Venue: Cairo Stadium Hall No. 2; Level: International Series; Prize: $10,000; Format: 32MS/32WS/32MD/32WD/64XD	(Myanmar) Thet Htar Thuzar	(Belarus) Alesia Zaitsava
22 October	Egypt International: Host: Cairo, Egypt; Venue: Cairo Stadium Hall No. 2; Level: International Series; Prize: $10,000; Format: 32MS/32WS/32MD/32WD/64XD	Score: Walkover	
22 October	Egypt International: Host: Cairo, Egypt; Venue: Cairo Stadium Hall No. 2; Level: International Series; Prize: $10,000; Format: 32MS/32WS/32MD/32WD/64XD	(Azerbaijan) Ade Resky Dwicahyo (Azerbaijan) Azmy Qowimuramadhoni	(Egypt) Ali Ahmed El-Khateeb (Malaysia) Yogendran Krishnan
22 October	Egypt International: Host: Cairo, Egypt; Venue: Cairo Stadium Hall No. 2; Level: International Series; Prize: $10,000; Format: 32MS/32WS/32MD/32WD/64XD	Score: 18–21, 21–16, 21–18	
22 October	Egypt International: Host: Cairo, Egypt; Venue: Cairo Stadium Hall No. 2; Level: International Series; Prize: $10,000; Format: 32MS/32WS/32MD/32WD/64XD	(India) Pooja Dandu (India) Sanjana Santosh	(Hungary) Nikoletta Bukoviczki (Hungary) Daniella Gonda
22 October	Egypt International: Host: Cairo, Egypt; Venue: Cairo Stadium Hall No. 2; Level: International Series; Prize: $10,000; Format: 32MS/32WS/32MD/32WD/64XD	Score: 21–13, 21–15	
22 October	Egypt International: Host: Cairo, Egypt; Venue: Cairo Stadium Hall No. 2; Level: International Series; Prize: $10,000; Format: 32MS/32WS/32MD/32WD/64XD	(Switzerland) Oliver Schaller (Switzerland) Céline Burkart	(Jordan) Bahaedeen Ahmad Alshannik (Jordan) Domou Amro
22 October	Egypt International: Host: Cairo, Egypt; Venue: Cairo Stadium Hall No. 2; Level: International Series; Prize: $10,000; Format: 32MS/32WS/32MD/32WD/64XD	Score: 21–4, 21–10	
22 October	Hatzor International: Host: Hatzor, Israel; Venue: Kibbutz Hatzor Sports Hall; Level: Future Series; Prize: TBC; Format: 32MS/32WS/16MD/16WD/16XD	(India) Kaushal Dharmamer	(Slovenia) Miha Ivanič
22 October	Hatzor International: Host: Hatzor, Israel; Venue: Kibbutz Hatzor Sports Hall; Level: Future Series; Prize: TBC; Format: 32MS/32WS/16MD/16WD/16XD	Score: 21–10, 14–21, 21–18	
22 October	Hatzor International: Host: Hatzor, Israel; Venue: Kibbutz Hatzor Sports Hall; Level: Future Series; Prize: TBC; Format: 32MS/32WS/16MD/16WD/16XD	(Israel) Ksenia Polikarpova	(Slovenia) Lia Šalehar
22 October	Hatzor International: Host: Hatzor, Israel; Venue: Kibbutz Hatzor Sports Hall; Level: Future Series; Prize: TBC; Format: 32MS/32WS/16MD/16WD/16XD	Score: 21–15, 21–12	
22 October	Hatzor International: Host: Hatzor, Israel; Venue: Kibbutz Hatzor Sports Hall; Level: Future Series; Prize: TBC; Format: 32MS/32WS/16MD/16WD/16XD	(Israel) Ariel Shainski (Czech Republic) Lukáš Zevl	(Slovenia) Andraž Krapež (Croatia) Filip Špoljarec
22 October	Hatzor International: Host: Hatzor, Israel; Venue: Kibbutz Hatzor Sports Hall; Level: Future Series; Prize: TBC; Format: 32MS/32WS/16MD/16WD/16XD	Score: 15–21, 21–15, 21–16	
22 October	Hatzor International: Host: Hatzor, Israel; Venue: Kibbutz Hatzor Sports Hall; Level: Future Series; Prize: TBC; Format: 32MS/32WS/16MD/16WD/16XD	(Israel) Ksenia Polikarpova (Belarus) Kristina Silich	(Slovenia) Iza Šalehar (Slovenia) Lia Šalehar
22 October	Hatzor International: Host: Hatzor, Israel; Venue: Kibbutz Hatzor Sports Hall; Level: Future Series; Prize: TBC; Format: 32MS/32WS/16MD/16WD/16XD	Score: 21–16, 23–25, 22–20	
22 October	Hatzor International: Host: Hatzor, Israel; Venue: Kibbutz Hatzor Sports Hall; Level: Future Series; Prize: TBC; Format: 32MS/32WS/16MD/16WD/16XD	(Ukraine) Mykhaylo Makhnovskiy (Ukraine) Anastasiya Prozorova	(Ukraine) Oleksandr Kolesnik (Ukraine) Yevgeniya Paksyutova
22 October	Hatzor International: Host: Hatzor, Israel; Venue: Kibbutz Hatzor Sports Hall; Level: Future Series; Prize: TBC; Format: 32MS/32WS/16MD/16WD/16XD	Score: 21–18, 21–19	
29 October	Macau Open (Draw): Host: Macau; Venue: Tap Seac Multi-sports Pavilion; Level: Super 300; Prize: $150,000; Format: 32MS/32WS/32MD/32WD/32XD	(South Korea) Lee Hyun-il	(China) Zhou Zeqi
29 October	Macau Open (Draw): Host: Macau; Venue: Tap Seac Multi-sports Pavilion; Level: Super 300; Prize: $150,000; Format: 32MS/32WS/32MD/32WD/32XD	Score: 21–9, 21–19	
29 October	Macau Open (Draw): Host: Macau; Venue: Tap Seac Multi-sports Pavilion; Level: Super 300; Prize: $150,000; Format: 32MS/32WS/32MD/32WD/32XD	(Canada) Michelle Li	(China) Han Yue
29 October	Macau Open (Draw): Host: Macau; Venue: Tap Seac Multi-sports Pavilion; Level: Super 300; Prize: $150,000; Format: 32MS/32WS/32MD/32WD/32XD	Score: 23–25, 21–17, 21–15	
29 October	Macau Open (Draw): Host: Macau; Venue: Tap Seac Multi-sports Pavilion; Level: Super 300; Prize: $150,000; Format: 32MS/32WS/32MD/32WD/32XD	(South Korea) Kim Gi-jung (South Korea) Lee Yong-dae	(South Korea) Ko Sung-hyun (South Korea) Shin Baek-cheol
29 October	Macau Open (Draw): Host: Macau; Venue: Tap Seac Multi-sports Pavilion; Level: Super 300; Prize: $150,000; Format: 32MS/32WS/32MD/32WD/32XD	Score: 17–21, 21–13, 21–19	
29 October	Macau Open (Draw): Host: Macau; Venue: Tap Seac Multi-sports Pavilion; Level: Super 300; Prize: $150,000; Format: 32MS/32WS/32MD/32WD/32XD	(Malaysia) Vivian Hoo (Malaysia) Yap Cheng Wen	(Japan) Misato Aratama (Japan) Akane Watanabe
29 October	Macau Open (Draw): Host: Macau; Venue: Tap Seac Multi-sports Pavilion; Level: Super 300; Prize: $150,000; Format: 32MS/32WS/32MD/32WD/32XD	Score: 21–15, 22–20	
29 October	Macau Open (Draw): Host: Macau; Venue: Tap Seac Multi-sports Pavilion; Level: Super 300; Prize: $150,000; Format: 32MS/32WS/32MD/32WD/32XD	(Hong Kong) Tang Chun Man (Hong Kong) Tse Ying Suet	(Hong Kong) Lee Chun Hei (Hong Kong) Chau Hoi Wah
29 October	Macau Open (Draw): Host: Macau; Venue: Tap Seac Multi-sports Pavilion; Level: Super 300; Prize: $150,000; Format: 32MS/32WS/32MD/32WD/32XD	Score: 21–14, 21–15	
29 October	SaarLorLux Open (Draw): Host: Saarbrücken, Germany; Venue: Saarlandhalle; Level: Super 100; Prize: $75,000; Format: 64MS/32WS/32MD/32WD/32XD	(India) Subhankar Dey	(England) Rajiv Ouseph
29 October	SaarLorLux Open (Draw): Host: Saarbrücken, Germany; Venue: Saarlandhalle; Level: Super 100; Prize: $75,000; Format: 64MS/32WS/32MD/32WD/32XD	Score: 21–11, 21–14	
29 October	SaarLorLux Open (Draw): Host: Saarbrücken, Germany; Venue: Saarlandhalle; Level: Super 100; Prize: $75,000; Format: 64MS/32WS/32MD/32WD/32XD	(China) Cai Yanyan	(China) Chen Xiaoxin
29 October	SaarLorLux Open (Draw): Host: Saarbrücken, Germany; Venue: Saarlandhalle; Level: Super 100; Prize: $75,000; Format: 64MS/32WS/32MD/32WD/32XD	Score: 21–19, 19–21, 21–17	
29 October	SaarLorLux Open (Draw): Host: Saarbrücken, Germany; Venue: Saarlandhalle; Level: Super 100; Prize: $75,000; Format: 64MS/32WS/32MD/32WD/32XD	(England) Marcus Ellis (England) Chris Langridge	(Malaysia) Aaron Chia (Malaysia) Soh Wooi Yik
29 October	SaarLorLux Open (Draw): Host: Saarbrücken, Germany; Venue: Saarlandhalle; Level: Super 100; Prize: $75,000; Format: 64MS/32WS/32MD/32WD/32XD	Score: 21–23, 21–18, 21–19	
29 October	SaarLorLux Open (Draw): Host: Saarbrücken, Germany; Venue: Saarlandhalle; Level: Super 100; Prize: $75,000; Format: 64MS/32WS/32MD/32WD/32XD	(Bulgaria) Gabriela Stoeva (Bulgaria) Stefani Stoeva	(Indonesia) Ni Ketut Mahadewi Istarani (Indonesia) Rizki Amelia Pradipta
29 October	SaarLorLux Open (Draw): Host: Saarbrücken, Germany; Venue: Saarlandhalle; Level: Super 100; Prize: $75,000; Format: 64MS/32WS/32MD/32WD/32XD	Score: 22–20, 15–21, 21–19	
29 October	SaarLorLux Open (Draw): Host: Saarbrücken, Germany; Venue: Saarlandhalle; Level: Super 100; Prize: $75,000; Format: 64MS/32WS/32MD/32WD/32XD	(England) Marcus Ellis (England) Lauren Smith	(China) Lu Kai (China) Chen Lu
29 October	SaarLorLux Open (Draw): Host: Saarbrücken, Germany; Venue: Saarlandhalle; Level: Super 100; Prize: $75,000; Format: 64MS/32WS/32MD/32WD/32XD	Score: 19–21, 21–18, 21–10	
29 October	Hungarian International: Host: Budaors, Hungary; Venue: Budaors Sportshall; Level: International Challenge; Prize: $25,000; Format: 32MS/32WS/32MD/32WD/32XD	(Denmark) Rasmus Messerschmidt	(Denmark) Victor Svendsen
29 October	Hungarian International: Host: Budaors, Hungary; Venue: Budaors Sportshall; Level: International Challenge; Prize: $25,000; Format: 32MS/32WS/32MD/32WD/32XD	Score: 14–21, 21–16, 21–9	
29 October	Hungarian International: Host: Budaors, Hungary; Venue: Budaors Sportshall; Level: International Challenge; Prize: $25,000; Format: 32MS/32WS/32MD/32WD/32XD	(Turkey) Neslihan Yiğit	(Bulgaria) Mariya Mitsova
29 October	Hungarian International: Host: Budaors, Hungary; Venue: Budaors Sportshall; Level: International Challenge; Prize: $25,000; Format: 32MS/32WS/32MD/32WD/32XD	Score: 21–14, 21–8	
29 October	Hungarian International: Host: Budaors, Hungary; Venue: Budaors Sportshall; Level: International Challenge; Prize: $25,000; Format: 32MS/32WS/32MD/32WD/32XD	(Denmark) David Daugaard (Denmark) Frederik Søgaard	(Poland) Miłosz Bochat (Poland) Adam Cwalina
29 October	Hungarian International: Host: Budaors, Hungary; Venue: Budaors Sportshall; Level: International Challenge; Prize: $25,000; Format: 32MS/32WS/32MD/32WD/32XD	Score: 15–21, 21–12, 21–12	
29 October	Hungarian International: Host: Budaors, Hungary; Venue: Budaors Sportshall; Level: International Challenge; Prize: $25,000; Format: 32MS/32WS/32MD/32WD/32XD	(Russia) Ekaterina Bolotova (Russia) Alina Davletova	(Sweden) Emma Karlsson (Sweden) Johanna Magnusson
29 October	Hungarian International: Host: Budaors, Hungary; Venue: Budaors Sportshall; Level: International Challenge; Prize: $25,000; Format: 32MS/32WS/32MD/32WD/32XD	Score: 21–14, 21–9	
29 October	Hungarian International: Host: Budaors, Hungary; Venue: Budaors Sportshall; Level: International Challenge; Prize: $25,000; Format: 32MS/32WS/32MD/32WD/32XD	(Denmark) Joel Eipe (Denmark) Mette Poulsen	(Russia) Rodion Alimov (Russia) Alina Davletova
29 October	Hungarian International: Host: Budaors, Hungary; Venue: Budaors Sportshall; Level: International Challenge; Prize: $25,000; Format: 32MS/32WS/32MD/32WD/32XD	Score: 21–10, 19–21, 21–10	
29 October	Bahrain International: Host: Isa Town, Bahrain; Venue: Khalifa Sports City; Level: International Series; Prize: $10,000; Format: 32MS/16WS/16MD/8WD/8XD	(Azerbaijan) Ade Resky Dwicahyo	(United States) Timothy Lam
29 October	Bahrain International: Host: Isa Town, Bahrain; Venue: Khalifa Sports City; Level: International Series; Prize: $10,000; Format: 32MS/16WS/16MD/8WD/8XD	Score: 21–13, 21–13	
29 October	Bahrain International: Host: Isa Town, Bahrain; Venue: Khalifa Sports City; Level: International Series; Prize: $10,000; Format: 32MS/16WS/16MD/8WD/8XD	(Indonesia) Sri Fatmawati	(India) Neha Pandit
29 October	Bahrain International: Host: Isa Town, Bahrain; Venue: Khalifa Sports City; Level: International Series; Prize: $10,000; Format: 32MS/16WS/16MD/8WD/8XD	Score: 21–8, 21–14	
29 October	Bahrain International: Host: Isa Town, Bahrain; Venue: Khalifa Sports City; Level: International Series; Prize: $10,000; Format: 32MS/16WS/16MD/8WD/8XD	(Azerbaijan) Ade Resky Dwicahyo (Azerbaijan) Azmy Qowimuramadhoni	(Bahrain) Adnan Ebrahim (Bahrain) Jaffer Ebrahim
29 October	Bahrain International: Host: Isa Town, Bahrain; Venue: Khalifa Sports City; Level: International Series; Prize: $10,000; Format: 32MS/16WS/16MD/8WD/8XD	Score: 21–15, 21–17	
29 October	Bahrain International: Host: Isa Town, Bahrain; Venue: Khalifa Sports City; Level: International Series; Prize: $10,000; Format: 32MS/16WS/16MD/8WD/8XD	(Bahrain) Rachel Jacob Cherickal (Bahrain) Jasmine Joy Bacani	(Bahrain) Amy Suneeth (Bahrain) Leanne Suneeth
29 October	Bahrain International: Host: Isa Town, Bahrain; Venue: Khalifa Sports City; Level: International Series; Prize: $10,000; Format: 32MS/16WS/16MD/8WD/8XD	Score: 15–21, 21–12, 21–17	
29 October	Bahrain International: Host: Isa Town, Bahrain; Venue: Khalifa Sports City; Level: International Series; Prize: $10,000; Format: 32MS/16WS/16MD/8WD/8XD	(Jordan) Bahaedeen Ahmad Alshannik (Jordan) Domou Amro	(Bahrain) Adnan Ebrahim (Bahrain) Rachel Jacob Cherickal
29 October	Bahrain International: Host: Isa Town, Bahrain; Venue: Khalifa Sports City; Level: International Series; Prize: $10,000; Format: 32MS/16WS/16MD/8WD/8XD	Score: 21–16, 21–11	

=== November ===
Week commencing	Tournament	Champions	Runners-up
5 November	Fuzhou China Open (Draw): Host: Fuzhou, China; Venue: Haixia Olympic Center Stadium; Level: Super 750; Prize: $700,000; Format: 32MS/32WS/32MD/32WD/32XD	(Japan) Kento Momota	(Chinese Taipei) Chou Tien-chen
5 November	Fuzhou China Open (Draw): Host: Fuzhou, China; Venue: Haixia Olympic Center Stadium; Level: Super 750; Prize: $700,000; Format: 32MS/32WS/32MD/32WD/32XD	Score: 21–13, 11–21, 21–16	
5 November	Fuzhou China Open (Draw): Host: Fuzhou, China; Venue: Haixia Olympic Center Stadium; Level: Super 750; Prize: $700,000; Format: 32MS/32WS/32MD/32WD/32XD	(China) Chen Yufei	(Japan) Nozomi Okuhara
5 November	Fuzhou China Open (Draw): Host: Fuzhou, China; Venue: Haixia Olympic Center Stadium; Level: Super 750; Prize: $700,000; Format: 32MS/32WS/32MD/32WD/32XD	Score: 21–10, 21–16	
5 November	Fuzhou China Open (Draw): Host: Fuzhou, China; Venue: Haixia Olympic Center Stadium; Level: Super 750; Prize: $700,000; Format: 32MS/32WS/32MD/32WD/32XD	(Indonesia) Marcus Fernaldi Gideon (Indonesia) Kevin Sanjaya Sukamuljo	(China) He Jiting (China) Tan Qiang
5 November	Fuzhou China Open (Draw): Host: Fuzhou, China; Venue: Haixia Olympic Center Stadium; Level: Super 750; Prize: $700,000; Format: 32MS/32WS/32MD/32WD/32XD	Score: 25–27, 21–17, 21–15	
5 November	Fuzhou China Open (Draw): Host: Fuzhou, China; Venue: Haixia Olympic Center Stadium; Level: Super 750; Prize: $700,000; Format: 32MS/32WS/32MD/32WD/32XD	(South Korea) Lee So-hee (South Korea) Shin Seung-chan	(Japan) Mayu Matsumoto (Japan) Wakana Nagahara
5 November	Fuzhou China Open (Draw): Host: Fuzhou, China; Venue: Haixia Olympic Center Stadium; Level: Super 750; Prize: $700,000; Format: 32MS/32WS/32MD/32WD/32XD	Score: 23–21, 21–18	
5 November	Fuzhou China Open (Draw): Host: Fuzhou, China; Venue: Haixia Olympic Center Stadium; Level: Super 750; Prize: $700,000; Format: 32MS/32WS/32MD/32WD/32XD	(China) Zheng Siwei (China) Huang Yaqiong	(China) Wang Yilyu (China) Huang Dongping
5 November	Fuzhou China Open (Draw): Host: Fuzhou, China; Venue: Haixia Olympic Center Stadium; Level: Super 750; Prize: $700,000; Format: 32MS/32WS/32MD/32WD/32XD	Score: 21–15, 11–21, 21–19	
5 November	Malaysia International: Host: Penang, Malaysia; Venue: Penang Badminton Hall; Level: International Series; Prize: $10,000; Format: 64MS/32WS/32MD/32WD/32XD	(Indonesia) Gatjra Piliang Fiqihilahi Cupu	(Chinese Taipei) Lu Chia-hung
5 November	Malaysia International: Host: Penang, Malaysia; Venue: Penang Badminton Hall; Level: International Series; Prize: $10,000; Format: 64MS/32WS/32MD/32WD/32XD	Score: 21–15, 21–11	
5 November	Malaysia International: Host: Penang, Malaysia; Venue: Penang Badminton Hall; Level: International Series; Prize: $10,000; Format: 64MS/32WS/32MD/32WD/32XD	(Malaysia) Kisona Selvaduray	(Chinese Taipei) Liang Ting-yu
5 November	Malaysia International: Host: Penang, Malaysia; Venue: Penang Badminton Hall; Level: International Series; Prize: $10,000; Format: 64MS/32WS/32MD/32WD/32XD	Score: 14–21, 21–7, 21–19	
5 November	Malaysia International: Host: Penang, Malaysia; Venue: Penang Badminton Hall; Level: International Series; Prize: $10,000; Format: 64MS/32WS/32MD/32WD/32XD	(South Korea) Ko Sung-hyun (South Korea) Shin Baek-cheol	(Chinese Taipei) Lin Shang-kai (Chinese Taipei) Tseng Min-hao
5 November	Malaysia International: Host: Penang, Malaysia; Venue: Penang Badminton Hall; Level: International Series; Prize: $10,000; Format: 64MS/32WS/32MD/32WD/32XD	Score: 21–18, 30–29	
5 November	Malaysia International: Host: Penang, Malaysia; Venue: Penang Badminton Hall; Level: International Series; Prize: $10,000; Format: 64MS/32WS/32MD/32WD/32XD	(Malaysia) Payee Lim Peiy Yee (Malaysia) Thinaah Muralitharan	(Chinese Taipei) Cheng Yu-chieh (Chinese Taipei) Chung Kan-yu
5 November	Malaysia International: Host: Penang, Malaysia; Venue: Penang Badminton Hall; Level: International Series; Prize: $10,000; Format: 64MS/32WS/32MD/32WD/32XD	Score: 21–17, 21–14	
5 November	Malaysia International: Host: Penang, Malaysia; Venue: Penang Badminton Hall; Level: International Series; Prize: $10,000; Format: 64MS/32WS/32MD/32WD/32XD	(Indonesia) Andika Ramadiansyah (Indonesia) Bunga Fitriani Romadhini	(Indonesia) Fachryza Abimanyu (Indonesia) Mychelle Crhystine Bandaso
5 November	Malaysia International: Host: Penang, Malaysia; Venue: Penang Badminton Hall; Level: International Series; Prize: $10,000; Format: 64MS/32WS/32MD/32WD/32XD	Score: 19–21, 21–15, 21–13	
5 November	Norwegian International: Host: Sandefjord, Norway; Venue: Jotunhallen; Level: International Series; Prize: $10,000; Format: 32MS/32WS/32MD/32WD/32XD	(Denmark) Rasmus Messerschmidt	(Spain) Luís Enrique Peñalver
5 November	Norwegian International: Host: Sandefjord, Norway; Venue: Jotunhallen; Level: International Series; Prize: $10,000; Format: 32MS/32WS/32MD/32WD/32XD	Score: 21–12, 21–16	
5 November	Norwegian International: Host: Sandefjord, Norway; Venue: Jotunhallen; Level: International Series; Prize: $10,000; Format: 32MS/32WS/32MD/32WD/32XD	(South Korea) Sim Yu-jin	(South Korea) Kim Ga-eun
5 November	Norwegian International: Host: Sandefjord, Norway; Venue: Jotunhallen; Level: International Series; Prize: $10,000; Format: 32MS/32WS/32MD/32WD/32XD	Score: 21–8, 18–21, 21–16	
5 November	Norwegian International: Host: Sandefjord, Norway; Venue: Jotunhallen; Level: International Series; Prize: $10,000; Format: 32MS/32WS/32MD/32WD/32XD	(South Korea) Choi Sol-gyu (South Korea) Seo Seung-jae	(Denmark) Mads Emil Christensen (Denmark) Kristoffer Knudsen
5 November	Norwegian International: Host: Sandefjord, Norway; Venue: Jotunhallen; Level: International Series; Prize: $10,000; Format: 32MS/32WS/32MD/32WD/32XD	Score: 21–12, 21–13	
5 November	Norwegian International: Host: Sandefjord, Norway; Venue: Jotunhallen; Level: International Series; Prize: $10,000; Format: 32MS/32WS/32MD/32WD/32XD	(Denmark) Gabriella Bøje (Denmark) Marie Louise Steffensen	(Estonia) Kati-Kreet Marran (Estonia) Helina Rüütel
5 November	Norwegian International: Host: Sandefjord, Norway; Venue: Jotunhallen; Level: International Series; Prize: $10,000; Format: 32MS/32WS/32MD/32WD/32XD	Score: 21–12, 21–17	
5 November	Norwegian International: Host: Sandefjord, Norway; Venue: Jotunhallen; Level: International Series; Prize: $10,000; Format: 32MS/32WS/32MD/32WD/32XD	(Denmark) Joel Eipe (Denmark) Mette Poulsen	(Denmark) Mathias Moldt Baskjær (Denmark) Marie Louise Steffensen
5 November	Norwegian International: Host: Sandefjord, Norway; Venue: Jotunhallen; Level: International Series; Prize: $10,000; Format: 32MS/32WS/32MD/32WD/32XD	Score: 21–12, 21–14	
12 November	Hong Kong Open (Draw): Host: Kowloon, Hong Kong; Venue: Hong Kong Coliseum; Level: Super 500; Prize: $400,000; Format: 32MS/32WS/32MD/32WD/32XD	(South Korea) Son Wan-ho	(Japan) Kenta Nishimoto
12 November	Hong Kong Open (Draw): Host: Kowloon, Hong Kong; Venue: Hong Kong Coliseum; Level: Super 500; Prize: $400,000; Format: 32MS/32WS/32MD/32WD/32XD	Score: 14–21, 21–17, 21–13	
12 November	Hong Kong Open (Draw): Host: Kowloon, Hong Kong; Venue: Hong Kong Coliseum; Level: Super 500; Prize: $400,000; Format: 32MS/32WS/32MD/32WD/32XD	(Japan) Nozomi Okuhara	(Thailand) Ratchanok Intanon
12 November	Hong Kong Open (Draw): Host: Kowloon, Hong Kong; Venue: Hong Kong Coliseum; Level: Super 500; Prize: $400,000; Format: 32MS/32WS/32MD/32WD/32XD	Score: 21–19, 24–22	
12 November	Hong Kong Open (Draw): Host: Kowloon, Hong Kong; Venue: Hong Kong Coliseum; Level: Super 500; Prize: $400,000; Format: 32MS/32WS/32MD/32WD/32XD	(Indonesia) Marcus Fernaldi Gideon (Indonesia) Kevin Sanjaya Sukamuljo	(Japan) Takeshi Kamura (Japan) Keigo Sonoda
12 November	Hong Kong Open (Draw): Host: Kowloon, Hong Kong; Venue: Hong Kong Coliseum; Level: Super 500; Prize: $400,000; Format: 32MS/32WS/32MD/32WD/32XD	Score: 21–13, 21–12	
12 November	Hong Kong Open (Draw): Host: Kowloon, Hong Kong; Venue: Hong Kong Coliseum; Level: Super 500; Prize: $400,000; Format: 32MS/32WS/32MD/32WD/32XD	(Japan) Yuki Fukushima (Japan) Sayaka Hirota	(South Korea) Lee So-hee (South Korea) Shin Seung-chan
12 November	Hong Kong Open (Draw): Host: Kowloon, Hong Kong; Venue: Hong Kong Coliseum; Level: Super 500; Prize: $400,000; Format: 32MS/32WS/32MD/32WD/32XD	Score: 21–18, 21–17	
12 November	Hong Kong Open (Draw): Host: Kowloon, Hong Kong; Venue: Hong Kong Coliseum; Level: Super 500; Prize: $400,000; Format: 32MS/32WS/32MD/32WD/32XD	(Japan) Yuta Watanabe (Japan) Arisa Higashino	(China) Wang Yilyu (China) Huang Dongping
12 November	Hong Kong Open (Draw): Host: Kowloon, Hong Kong; Venue: Hong Kong Coliseum; Level: Super 500; Prize: $400,000; Format: 32MS/32WS/32MD/32WD/32XD	Score: 21–18, 21–14	
12 November	Dubai International: Host: Dubai, United Arab Emirates; Venue: Nas Sports Complex; Level: International Challenge; Prize: $25,000; Format: 64MS/32WS/32MD/32WD/32XD	(Russia) Vladimir Malkov	(India) Subhankar Dey
12 November	Dubai International: Host: Dubai, United Arab Emirates; Venue: Nas Sports Complex; Level: International Challenge; Prize: $25,000; Format: 64MS/32WS/32MD/32WD/32XD	Score: 21–10, 21–15	
12 November	Dubai International: Host: Dubai, United Arab Emirates; Venue: Nas Sports Complex; Level: International Challenge; Prize: $25,000; Format: 64MS/32WS/32MD/32WD/32XD	(India) Ashmita Chaliha	(South Korea) Jeon Ju-i
12 November	Dubai International: Host: Dubai, United Arab Emirates; Venue: Nas Sports Complex; Level: International Challenge; Prize: $25,000; Format: 64MS/32WS/32MD/32WD/32XD	Score: 21–19, 21–15	
12 November	Dubai International: Host: Dubai, United Arab Emirates; Venue: Nas Sports Complex; Level: International Challenge; Prize: $25,000; Format: 64MS/32WS/32MD/32WD/32XD	(South Korea) Kim Sang-soo (South Korea) Yoo Yeon-seong	(India) Tarun Kona (Malaysia) Lim Khim Wah
12 November	Dubai International: Host: Dubai, United Arab Emirates; Venue: Nas Sports Complex; Level: International Challenge; Prize: $25,000; Format: 64MS/32WS/32MD/32WD/32XD	Score: 21–16, 21–9	
12 November	Dubai International: Host: Dubai, United Arab Emirates; Venue: Nas Sports Complex; Level: International Challenge; Prize: $25,000; Format: 64MS/32WS/32MD/32WD/32XD	(South Korea) Go Ah-ra (South Korea) Yoo Chae-ran	(South Korea) Bang Ji-sun (South Korea) Jeon Ju-i
12 November	Dubai International: Host: Dubai, United Arab Emirates; Venue: Nas Sports Complex; Level: International Challenge; Prize: $25,000; Format: 64MS/32WS/32MD/32WD/32XD	Score: 21–14, 21–15	
12 November	Dubai International: Host: Dubai, United Arab Emirates; Venue: Nas Sports Complex; Level: International Challenge; Prize: $25,000; Format: 64MS/32WS/32MD/32WD/32XD	(South Korea) Yoo Yeon-seong (South Korea) Park So-young	(Russia) Denis Grachev (Russia) Ekaterina Bolotova
12 November	Dubai International: Host: Dubai, United Arab Emirates; Venue: Nas Sports Complex; Level: International Challenge; Prize: $25,000; Format: 64MS/32WS/32MD/32WD/32XD	Score: 21–14, 17–21, 21–14	
12 November	Irish Open: Host: Dublin, Ireland; Venue: National Indoor Arena; Level: International Series; Prize: $10,000; Format: 32MS/32WS/32MD/32WD/32XD	(France) Léo Rossi	(Germany) Lars Schänzler
12 November	Irish Open: Host: Dublin, Ireland; Venue: National Indoor Arena; Level: International Series; Prize: $10,000; Format: 32MS/32WS/32MD/32WD/32XD	Score: 21–17, 21–9	
12 November	Irish Open: Host: Dublin, Ireland; Venue: National Indoor Arena; Level: International Series; Prize: $10,000; Format: 32MS/32WS/32MD/32WD/32XD	(South Korea) An Se-young	(South Korea) Kim Ga-eun
12 November	Irish Open: Host: Dublin, Ireland; Venue: National Indoor Arena; Level: International Series; Prize: $10,000; Format: 32MS/32WS/32MD/32WD/32XD	Score: 26–24, 21–17	
12 November	Irish Open: Host: Dublin, Ireland; Venue: National Indoor Arena; Level: International Series; Prize: $10,000; Format: 32MS/32WS/32MD/32WD/32XD	(South Korea) Choi Sol-gyu (South Korea) Seo Seung-jae	(Scotland) Jack MacGregor (Scotland) Ciar Pringle
12 November	Irish Open: Host: Dublin, Ireland; Venue: National Indoor Arena; Level: International Series; Prize: $10,000; Format: 32MS/32WS/32MD/32WD/32XD	Score: 21–17, 21–12	
12 November	Irish Open: Host: Dublin, Ireland; Venue: National Indoor Arena; Level: International Series; Prize: $10,000; Format: 32MS/32WS/32MD/32WD/32XD	(England) Emily Westwood (Malaysia) Yang Li Lian	(England) Jessica Hopton (England) Victoria Williams
12 November	Irish Open: Host: Dublin, Ireland; Venue: National Indoor Arena; Level: International Series; Prize: $10,000; Format: 32MS/32WS/32MD/32WD/32XD	Score: 21–15, 19–21, 21–19	
12 November	Irish Open: Host: Dublin, Ireland; Venue: National Indoor Arena; Level: International Series; Prize: $10,000; Format: 32MS/32WS/32MD/32WD/32XD	(Republic of Ireland) Sam Magee (Republic of Ireland) Chloe Magee	(England) Harley Towler (England) Emily Westwood
12 November	Irish Open: Host: Dublin, Ireland; Venue: National Indoor Arena; Level: International Series; Prize: $10,000; Format: 32MS/32WS/32MD/32WD/32XD	Score: 21–13, 21–12	
12 November	Suriname International: Host: Paramaribo, Suriname; Venue: Ring Sport Center; Level: International Series; Prize: $10,000; Format: 32MS/32WS/16MD/8WD/16XD	(Guatemala) Kevin Cordón	(Belgium) Elias Bracke
12 November	Suriname International: Host: Paramaribo, Suriname; Venue: Ring Sport Center; Level: International Series; Prize: $10,000; Format: 32MS/32WS/16MD/8WD/16XD	Score: 21–13, 21–15	
12 November	Suriname International: Host: Paramaribo, Suriname; Venue: Ring Sport Center; Level: International Series; Prize: $10,000; Format: 32MS/32WS/16MD/8WD/16XD	(Belgium) Lianne Tan	(Peru) Daniela Macías
12 November	Suriname International: Host: Paramaribo, Suriname; Venue: Ring Sport Center; Level: International Series; Prize: $10,000; Format: 32MS/32WS/16MD/8WD/16XD	Score: 21–10, 21–6	
12 November	Suriname International: Host: Paramaribo, Suriname; Venue: Ring Sport Center; Level: International Series; Prize: $10,000; Format: 32MS/32WS/16MD/8WD/16XD	(Jamaica) Dennis Coke (Jamaica) Anthony McNee	(Guatemala) Rodolfo Ramírez (Guatemala) Jonathan Solís
12 November	Suriname International: Host: Paramaribo, Suriname; Venue: Ring Sport Center; Level: International Series; Prize: $10,000; Format: 32MS/32WS/16MD/8WD/16XD	Score: Walkover	
12 November	Suriname International: Host: Paramaribo, Suriname; Venue: Ring Sport Center; Level: International Series; Prize: $10,000; Format: 32MS/32WS/16MD/8WD/16XD	(Peru) Daniela Macías (Peru) Dánica Nishimura	(Guatemala) Nikté Sotomayor (Guatemala) Diana Corleto
12 November	Suriname International: Host: Paramaribo, Suriname; Venue: Ring Sport Center; Level: International Series; Prize: $10,000; Format: 32MS/32WS/16MD/8WD/16XD	Score: 21–10, 21–12	
12 November	Suriname International: Host: Paramaribo, Suriname; Venue: Ring Sport Center; Level: International Series; Prize: $10,000; Format: 32MS/32WS/16MD/8WD/16XD	(Dominican Republic) César Brito (Dominican Republic) Bermary Polanco	(Suriname) Mitchel Wongsodikromo (Jamaica) Katherine Wynter
12 November	Suriname International: Host: Paramaribo, Suriname; Venue: Ring Sport Center; Level: International Series; Prize: $10,000; Format: 32MS/32WS/16MD/8WD/16XD	Score: 21–10, 21–16	
19 November	Syed Modi International (Report): Host: Lucknow, India; Venue: Babu Banarasi Das Indoor Stadium; Level: Super 300; Prize: $150,000; Format: 32MS/32WS/32MD/32WD/32XD	(India) Sameer Verma	(China) Lu Guangzu
19 November	Syed Modi International (Report): Host: Lucknow, India; Venue: Babu Banarasi Das Indoor Stadium; Level: Super 300; Prize: $150,000; Format: 32MS/32WS/32MD/32WD/32XD	Score: 16–21, 21–19, 21–14	
19 November	Syed Modi International (Report): Host: Lucknow, India; Venue: Babu Banarasi Das Indoor Stadium; Level: Super 300; Prize: $150,000; Format: 32MS/32WS/32MD/32WD/32XD	(China) Han Yue	(India) Saina Nehwal
19 November	Syed Modi International (Report): Host: Lucknow, India; Venue: Babu Banarasi Das Indoor Stadium; Level: Super 300; Prize: $150,000; Format: 32MS/32WS/32MD/32WD/32XD	Score: 21–18, 21–8	
19 November	Syed Modi International (Report): Host: Lucknow, India; Venue: Babu Banarasi Das Indoor Stadium; Level: Super 300; Prize: $150,000; Format: 32MS/32WS/32MD/32WD/32XD	(Indonesia) Fajar Alfian (Indonesia) Muhammad Rian Ardianto	(India) Satwiksairaj Rankireddy (India) Chirag Shetty
19 November	Syed Modi International (Report): Host: Lucknow, India; Venue: Babu Banarasi Das Indoor Stadium; Level: Super 300; Prize: $150,000; Format: 32MS/32WS/32MD/32WD/32XD	Score: 21–11, 22–20	
19 November	Syed Modi International (Report): Host: Lucknow, India; Venue: Babu Banarasi Das Indoor Stadium; Level: Super 300; Prize: $150,000; Format: 32MS/32WS/32MD/32WD/32XD	(Malaysia) Chow Mei Kuan (Malaysia) Lee Meng Yean	(India) Ashwini Ponnappa (India) N. Sikki Reddy
19 November	Syed Modi International (Report): Host: Lucknow, India; Venue: Babu Banarasi Das Indoor Stadium; Level: Super 300; Prize: $150,000; Format: 32MS/32WS/32MD/32WD/32XD	Score: 21–15, 21–13	
19 November	Syed Modi International (Report): Host: Lucknow, India; Venue: Babu Banarasi Das Indoor Stadium; Level: Super 300; Prize: $150,000; Format: 32MS/32WS/32MD/32WD/32XD	(China) Ou Xuanyi (China) Feng Xueying	(Indonesia) Rinov Rivaldy (Indonesia) Pitha Haningtyas Mentari
19 November	Syed Modi International (Report): Host: Lucknow, India; Venue: Babu Banarasi Das Indoor Stadium; Level: Super 300; Prize: $150,000; Format: 32MS/32WS/32MD/32WD/32XD	Score: 22–20, 21–10	
19 November	Scottish Open (Report): Host: Glasgow, Scotland; Venue: Emirates Arena; Level: Super 100; Prize: $75,000; Format: 64MS/32WS/32MD/32WD/32XD	(China) Liu Haichao	(China) Sun Feixiang
19 November	Scottish Open (Report): Host: Glasgow, Scotland; Venue: Emirates Arena; Level: Super 100; Prize: $75,000; Format: 64MS/32WS/32MD/32WD/32XD	Score: 21–17, 22–20	
19 November	Scottish Open (Report): Host: Glasgow, Scotland; Venue: Emirates Arena; Level: Super 100; Prize: $75,000; Format: 64MS/32WS/32MD/32WD/32XD	(Scotland) Kirsty Gilmour	(Denmark) Line Kjærsfeldt
19 November	Scottish Open (Report): Host: Glasgow, Scotland; Venue: Emirates Arena; Level: Super 100; Prize: $75,000; Format: 64MS/32WS/32MD/32WD/32XD	Score: 21–16, 18–21, 21–18	
19 November	Scottish Open (Report): Host: Glasgow, Scotland; Venue: Emirates Arena; Level: Super 100; Prize: $75,000; Format: 64MS/32WS/32MD/32WD/32XD	(England) Marcus Ellis (England) Chris Langridge	(Denmark) David Daugaard (Denmark) Frederik Søgaard
19 November	Scottish Open (Report): Host: Glasgow, Scotland; Venue: Emirates Arena; Level: Super 100; Prize: $75,000; Format: 64MS/32WS/32MD/32WD/32XD	Score: 23–21, 21–16	
19 November	Scottish Open (Report): Host: Glasgow, Scotland; Venue: Emirates Arena; Level: Super 100; Prize: $75,000; Format: 64MS/32WS/32MD/32WD/32XD	(Bulgaria) Gabriela Stoeva (Bulgaria) Stefani Stoeva	(France) Émilie Lefel (France) Anne Tran
19 November	Scottish Open (Report): Host: Glasgow, Scotland; Venue: Emirates Arena; Level: Super 100; Prize: $75,000; Format: 64MS/32WS/32MD/32WD/32XD	Score: 21–16, 21–9	
19 November	Scottish Open (Report): Host: Glasgow, Scotland; Venue: Emirates Arena; Level: Super 100; Prize: $75,000; Format: 64MS/32WS/32MD/32WD/32XD	(England) Marcus Ellis (England) Lauren Smith	(Netherlands) Jacco Arends (Netherlands) Selena Piek
19 November	Scottish Open (Report): Host: Glasgow, Scotland; Venue: Emirates Arena; Level: Super 100; Prize: $75,000; Format: 64MS/32WS/32MD/32WD/32XD	Score: 13–6 Retired	
19 November	Kazakhstan International: Host: Uralsk, Kazakhstan; Venue: Multipurpose Sporhall; Level: International Series; Prize: $10,000; Format: 64MS/32WS/32MD/16WD/32XD	(Kazakhstan) Dmitriy Panarin	(Kazakhstan) Artur Niyazov
19 November	Kazakhstan International: Host: Uralsk, Kazakhstan; Venue: Multipurpose Sporhall; Level: International Series; Prize: $10,000; Format: 64MS/32WS/32MD/16WD/32XD	Score: 13–21, 21–14, 21–9	
19 November	Kazakhstan International: Host: Uralsk, Kazakhstan; Venue: Multipurpose Sporhall; Level: International Series; Prize: $10,000; Format: 64MS/32WS/32MD/16WD/32XD	(Russia) Anastasia Redkina	(Russia) Anastasiia Pustinskaia
19 November	Kazakhstan International: Host: Uralsk, Kazakhstan; Venue: Multipurpose Sporhall; Level: International Series; Prize: $10,000; Format: 64MS/32WS/32MD/16WD/32XD	Score: 23–21, 11–21, 21–8	
19 November	Kazakhstan International: Host: Uralsk, Kazakhstan; Venue: Multipurpose Sporhall; Level: International Series; Prize: $10,000; Format: 64MS/32WS/32MD/16WD/32XD	(Kazakhstan) Artur Niyazov (Kazakhstan) Dmitriy Panarin	(Kazakhstan) Khaitmurat Kulmatov (Russia) Ryhor Varabyou
19 November	Kazakhstan International: Host: Uralsk, Kazakhstan; Venue: Multipurpose Sporhall; Level: International Series; Prize: $10,000; Format: 64MS/32WS/32MD/16WD/32XD	Score: 21–15, 21–11	
19 November	Kazakhstan International: Host: Uralsk, Kazakhstan; Venue: Multipurpose Sporhall; Level: International Series; Prize: $10,000; Format: 64MS/32WS/32MD/16WD/32XD	(Russia) Ekaterina Kadochnikova (Russia) Anastasia Redkina	(Russia) Daria Dzhedzhula (Russia) Viktoriia Vorobeva
19 November	Kazakhstan International: Host: Uralsk, Kazakhstan; Venue: Multipurpose Sporhall; Level: International Series; Prize: $10,000; Format: 64MS/32WS/32MD/16WD/32XD	Score: 24–22, 21–19	
19 November	Kazakhstan International: Host: Uralsk, Kazakhstan; Venue: Multipurpose Sporhall; Level: International Series; Prize: $10,000; Format: 64MS/32WS/32MD/16WD/32XD	(Russia) Rodion Kargaev (Russia) Viktoriia Vorobeva	(Kazakhstan) Dmitriy Panarin (Russia) Anastasiia Pustinskaia
19 November	Kazakhstan International: Host: Uralsk, Kazakhstan; Venue: Multipurpose Sporhall; Level: International Series; Prize: $10,000; Format: 64MS/32WS/32MD/16WD/32XD	Score: 21–13, 21–18	
19 November	Slovenian International: Host: Brežice, Slovenia; Venue: Športna hall Brežice; Level: Future Series; Prize: TBC; Format: 32MS/32WS/32MD/16WD/32XD	(Serbia) Luka Milić	(Indonesia) Hermansah
19 November	Slovenian International: Host: Brežice, Slovenia; Venue: Športna hall Brežice; Level: Future Series; Prize: TBC; Format: 32MS/32WS/32MD/16WD/32XD	Score: 23–21, 11–21, 21–11	
19 November	Slovenian International: Host: Brežice, Slovenia; Venue: Športna hall Brežice; Level: Future Series; Prize: TBC; Format: 32MS/32WS/32MD/16WD/32XD	(Spain) Sara Peñalver	(Slovenia) Kaja Stanković
19 November	Slovenian International: Host: Brežice, Slovenia; Venue: Športna hall Brežice; Level: Future Series; Prize: TBC; Format: 32MS/32WS/32MD/16WD/32XD	Score: 21–6, 21–12	
19 November	Slovenian International: Host: Brežice, Slovenia; Venue: Športna hall Brežice; Level: Future Series; Prize: TBC; Format: 32MS/32WS/32MD/16WD/32XD	(Denmark) Oliver Gram (Denmark) Mads Thøgersen	(Austria) Philip Birker (Austria) Dominik Stipsits
19 November	Slovenian International: Host: Brežice, Slovenia; Venue: Športna hall Brežice; Level: Future Series; Prize: TBC; Format: 32MS/32WS/32MD/16WD/32XD	Score: 21–18, 21–19	
19 November	Slovenian International: Host: Brežice, Slovenia; Venue: Športna hall Brežice; Level: Future Series; Prize: TBC; Format: 32MS/32WS/32MD/16WD/32XD	(Croatia) Katarina Galenić (Croatia) Maja Pavlinić	(France) Julie Ferrier (France) Manon Kriéger
19 November	Slovenian International: Host: Brežice, Slovenia; Venue: Športna hall Brežice; Level: Future Series; Prize: TBC; Format: 32MS/32WS/32MD/16WD/32XD	Score: 21–15, 21–10	
19 November	Slovenian International: Host: Brežice, Slovenia; Venue: Športna hall Brežice; Level: Future Series; Prize: TBC; Format: 32MS/32WS/32MD/16WD/32XD	(Slovenia) Miha Ivančič (Slovenia) Petra Polanc	(France) Louis Ducrot (France) Candice Lesne
19 November	Slovenian International: Host: Brežice, Slovenia; Venue: Športna hall Brežice; Level: Future Series; Prize: TBC; Format: 32MS/32WS/32MD/16WD/32XD	Score: 21–15, 21–13	
19 November	Botswana International: Host: Gaborone, Botswana; Venue: Lobtase Sports Complex; Level: Future Series; Prize: TBC; Format: 32MS/32WS/32MD/16WD/16XD	(Azerbaijan) Ade Resky Dwicahyo	(Azerbaijan) Azmy Qowimuramadhoni
19 November	Botswana International: Host: Gaborone, Botswana; Venue: Lobtase Sports Complex; Level: Future Series; Prize: TBC; Format: 32MS/32WS/32MD/16WD/16XD	Score: 21–14, 21–11	
19 November	Botswana International: Host: Gaborone, Botswana; Venue: Lobtase Sports Complex; Level: Future Series; Prize: TBC; Format: 32MS/32WS/32MD/16WD/16XD	(Jordan) Domou Amro	(Zambia) Ogar Siamupangila
19 November	Botswana International: Host: Gaborone, Botswana; Venue: Lobtase Sports Complex; Level: Future Series; Prize: TBC; Format: 32MS/32WS/32MD/16WD/16XD	Score: 28–26, 21–19	
19 November	Botswana International: Host: Gaborone, Botswana; Venue: Lobtase Sports Complex; Level: Future Series; Prize: TBC; Format: 32MS/32WS/32MD/16WD/16XD	(Azerbaijan) Ade Resky Dwicahyo (Azerbaijan) Azmy Qowimuramadhoni	(Zambia) Donald Mabo (Zambia) Kalombo Mulenga
19 November	Botswana International: Host: Gaborone, Botswana; Venue: Lobtase Sports Complex; Level: Future Series; Prize: TBC; Format: 32MS/32WS/32MD/16WD/16XD	Score: 21–9, 21–19	
19 November	Botswana International: Host: Gaborone, Botswana; Venue: Lobtase Sports Complex; Level: Future Series; Prize: TBC; Format: 32MS/32WS/32MD/16WD/16XD	(South Africa) Michelle Butler-Emmett (South Africa) Jennifer Fry	(Botswana) Tessa Kabelo (Botswana) Tebogo Ndzinge
19 November	Botswana International: Host: Gaborone, Botswana; Venue: Lobtase Sports Complex; Level: Future Series; Prize: TBC; Format: 32MS/32WS/32MD/16WD/16XD	Score: 21–7, 21–9	
19 November	Botswana International: Host: Gaborone, Botswana; Venue: Lobtase Sports Complex; Level: Future Series; Prize: TBC; Format: 32MS/32WS/32MD/16WD/16XD	(South Africa) Andries Malan (South Africa) Jennifer Fry	(Jordan) Bahaedeen Ahmad Alshannik (Jordan) Domou Amro
19 November	Botswana International: Host: Gaborone, Botswana; Venue: Lobtase Sports Complex; Level: Future Series; Prize: TBC; Format: 32MS/32WS/32MD/16WD/16XD	Score: 21–18, 20–22, 21–19	
26 November	Korea Masters (Draw): Host: Gwangju, South Korea; Venue: Gwangju Women's University Stadium; Level: Super 300; Prize: $250,000; Format: 32MS/32WS/32MD/32WD/32XD	(South Korea) Son Wan-ho	(Malaysia) Lee Zii Jia
26 November	Korea Masters (Draw): Host: Gwangju, South Korea; Venue: Gwangju Women's University Stadium; Level: Super 300; Prize: $250,000; Format: 32MS/32WS/32MD/32WD/32XD	Score: 21–16, 21–11	
26 November	Korea Masters (Draw): Host: Gwangju, South Korea; Venue: Gwangju Women's University Stadium; Level: Super 300; Prize: $250,000; Format: 32MS/32WS/32MD/32WD/32XD	(China) Li Xuerui	(China) Han Yue
26 November	Korea Masters (Draw): Host: Gwangju, South Korea; Venue: Gwangju Women's University Stadium; Level: Super 300; Prize: $250,000; Format: 32MS/32WS/32MD/32WD/32XD	Score: 21–10, 21–18	
26 November	Korea Masters (Draw): Host: Gwangju, South Korea; Venue: Gwangju Women's University Stadium; Level: Super 300; Prize: $250,000; Format: 32MS/32WS/32MD/32WD/32XD	(South Korea) Choi Sol-gyu (South Korea) Seo Seung-jae	(Chinese Taipei) Po Li-wei (Chinese Taipei) Wang Chi-lin
26 November	Korea Masters (Draw): Host: Gwangju, South Korea; Venue: Gwangju Women's University Stadium; Level: Super 300; Prize: $250,000; Format: 32MS/32WS/32MD/32WD/32XD	Score: 21–12, 17–21, 21–18	
26 November	Korea Masters (Draw): Host: Gwangju, South Korea; Venue: Gwangju Women's University Stadium; Level: Super 300; Prize: $250,000; Format: 32MS/32WS/32MD/32WD/32XD	(South Korea) Chang Ye-na (South Korea) Jung Kyung-eun	(South Korea) Lee So-hee (South Korea) Shin Seung-chan
26 November	Korea Masters (Draw): Host: Gwangju, South Korea; Venue: Gwangju Women's University Stadium; Level: Super 300; Prize: $250,000; Format: 32MS/32WS/32MD/32WD/32XD	Score: 21–14, 21–17	
26 November	Korea Masters (Draw): Host: Gwangju, South Korea; Venue: Gwangju Women's University Stadium; Level: Super 300; Prize: $250,000; Format: 32MS/32WS/32MD/32WD/32XD	(South Korea) Ko Sung-hyun (South Korea) Eom Hye-won	(South Korea) Choi Sol-gyu (South Korea) Shin Seung-chan
26 November	Korea Masters (Draw): Host: Gwangju, South Korea; Venue: Gwangju Women's University Stadium; Level: Super 300; Prize: $250,000; Format: 32MS/32WS/32MD/32WD/32XD	Score: 21–12, 15–21, 21–18	
26 November	India International: Host: Mumbai, India; Venue: Cricket Club of India; Level: International Challenge; Prize: $25,000; Format: 32MS/32WS/16MD/16WD/16XD	(India) Lakshya Sen	(Thailand) Kunlavut Vitidsarn
26 November	India International: Host: Mumbai, India; Venue: Cricket Club of India; Level: International Challenge; Prize: $25,000; Format: 32MS/32WS/16MD/16WD/16XD	Score: 21–15, 21–10	
26 November	India International: Host: Mumbai, India; Venue: Cricket Club of India; Level: International Challenge; Prize: $25,000; Format: 32MS/32WS/16MD/16WD/16XD	(India) Ashmita Chaliha	(India) Vrushali Gummadi
26 November	India International: Host: Mumbai, India; Venue: Cricket Club of India; Level: International Challenge; Prize: $25,000; Format: 32MS/32WS/16MD/16WD/16XD	Score: 21–16, 21–13	
26 November	India International: Host: Mumbai, India; Venue: Cricket Club of India; Level: International Challenge; Prize: $25,000; Format: 32MS/32WS/16MD/16WD/16XD	(India) Arjun M.R. (India) B. Sumeeth Reddy	(Malaysia) Goh Sze Fei (Malaysia) Nur Izzuddin
26 November	India International: Host: Mumbai, India; Venue: Cricket Club of India; Level: International Challenge; Prize: $25,000; Format: 32MS/32WS/16MD/16WD/16XD	Score: 21–10, 21–16	
26 November	India International: Host: Mumbai, India; Venue: Cricket Club of India; Level: International Challenge; Prize: $25,000; Format: 32MS/32WS/16MD/16WD/16XD	(Hong Kong) Ng Wing Yung (Hong Kong) Yeung Nga Ting	(India) Meghana Jakkampudi (India) Poorvisha S. Ram
26 November	India International: Host: Mumbai, India; Venue: Cricket Club of India; Level: International Challenge; Prize: $25,000; Format: 32MS/32WS/16MD/16WD/16XD	Score: 21–10, 21–11	
26 November	India International: Host: Mumbai, India; Venue: Cricket Club of India; Level: International Challenge; Prize: $25,000; Format: 32MS/32WS/16MD/16WD/16XD	(Thailand) Nipitphon Phuangphuapet (Thailand) Savitree Amitrapai	(Hong Kong) Chang Tak Ching (Hong Kong) Ng Wing Yung
26 November	India International: Host: Mumbai, India; Venue: Cricket Club of India; Level: International Challenge; Prize: $25,000; Format: 32MS/32WS/16MD/16WD/16XD	Score: 21–13, 21–16	
26 November	Welsh International: Host: Cardiff, Wales; Venue: Sport Wales National Centre; Level: International Series; Prize: $10,000; Format: 32MS/32WS/32MD/32WD/32XD	(Spain) Luís Enrique Peñalver	(England) Alex Lane
26 November	Welsh International: Host: Cardiff, Wales; Venue: Sport Wales National Centre; Level: International Series; Prize: $10,000; Format: 32MS/32WS/32MD/32WD/32XD	Score: 21–19, 22–20	
26 November	Welsh International: Host: Cardiff, Wales; Venue: Sport Wales National Centre; Level: International Series; Prize: $10,000; Format: 32MS/32WS/32MD/32WD/32XD	(Spain) Clara Azurmendi	(Netherlands) Gayle Mahulette
26 November	Welsh International: Host: Cardiff, Wales; Venue: Sport Wales National Centre; Level: International Series; Prize: $10,000; Format: 32MS/32WS/32MD/32WD/32XD	Score: 12–21, 21–6, 21–12	
26 November	Welsh International: Host: Cardiff, Wales; Venue: Sport Wales National Centre; Level: International Series; Prize: $10,000; Format: 32MS/32WS/32MD/32WD/32XD	(England) Max Flynn (England) Callum Hemming	(Denmark) Andreas Søndergaard (Denmark) Mikkel Stoffersen
26 November	Welsh International: Host: Cardiff, Wales; Venue: Sport Wales National Centre; Level: International Series; Prize: $10,000; Format: 32MS/32WS/32MD/32WD/32XD	Score: 28–26, 21–17	
26 November	Welsh International: Host: Cardiff, Wales; Venue: Sport Wales National Centre; Level: International Series; Prize: $10,000; Format: 32MS/32WS/32MD/32WD/32XD	(Scotland) Julie MacPherson (Scotland) Holly Newall	(Denmark) Susan Ekelund (Denmark) Line Fleischer
26 November	Welsh International: Host: Cardiff, Wales; Venue: Sport Wales National Centre; Level: International Series; Prize: $10,000; Format: 32MS/32WS/32MD/32WD/32XD	Score: 22–20, 21–12	
26 November	Welsh International: Host: Cardiff, Wales; Venue: Sport Wales National Centre; Level: International Series; Prize: $10,000; Format: 32MS/32WS/32MD/32WD/32XD	(England) Matthew Clare (England) Victoria Williams	(England) Max Flynn (Sweden) Moa Sjöö
26 November	Welsh International: Host: Cardiff, Wales; Venue: Sport Wales National Centre; Level: International Series; Prize: $10,000; Format: 32MS/32WS/32MD/32WD/32XD	Score: 21–14, 21–8	
26 November	Dominican Open: Host: Santo Domingo, Dominican Republic; Venue: Tennis Table Pavilion; Level: Future Series; Prize: $6,000; Format: 32MS/32WS/16MD/16WD/16XD	(Mexico) Job Castillo	(Dominican Republic) César Brito
26 November	Dominican Open: Host: Santo Domingo, Dominican Republic; Venue: Tennis Table Pavilion; Level: Future Series; Prize: $6,000; Format: 32MS/32WS/16MD/16WD/16XD	Score: 21–14, 21–14	
26 November	Dominican Open: Host: Santo Domingo, Dominican Republic; Venue: Tennis Table Pavilion; Level: Future Series; Prize: $6,000; Format: 32MS/32WS/16MD/16WD/16XD	(Mexico) Sabrina Solís	(Dominican Republic) Nairoby Jiménez
26 November	Dominican Open: Host: Santo Domingo, Dominican Republic; Venue: Tennis Table Pavilion; Level: Future Series; Prize: $6,000; Format: 32MS/32WS/16MD/16WD/16XD	Score: 21–5, 21–15	
26 November	Dominican Open: Host: Santo Domingo, Dominican Republic; Venue: Tennis Table Pavilion; Level: Future Series; Prize: $6,000; Format: 32MS/32WS/16MD/16WD/16XD	(Mexico) Job Castillo (Mexico) Luis Montoya	(Dominican Republic) William Cabrera (Dominican Republic) Nelson Javier
26 November	Dominican Open: Host: Santo Domingo, Dominican Republic; Venue: Tennis Table Pavilion; Level: Future Series; Prize: $6,000; Format: 32MS/32WS/16MD/16WD/16XD	Score: 21–18, 21–18	
26 November	Dominican Open: Host: Santo Domingo, Dominican Republic; Venue: Tennis Table Pavilion; Level: Future Series; Prize: $6,000; Format: 32MS/32WS/16MD/16WD/16XD	(Dominican Republic) Nairoby Jiménez (Dominican Republic) Bermary Polanco	(Dominican Republic) Alisa Acosta (Dominican Republic) Kahina Vásquez
26 November	Dominican Open: Host: Santo Domingo, Dominican Republic; Venue: Tennis Table Pavilion; Level: Future Series; Prize: $6,000; Format: 32MS/32WS/16MD/16WD/16XD	Score: 21–6, 21–10	
26 November	Dominican Open: Host: Santo Domingo, Dominican Republic; Venue: Tennis Table Pavilion; Level: Future Series; Prize: $6,000; Format: 32MS/32WS/16MD/16WD/16XD	(Dominican Republic) Nelson Javier (Dominican Republic) Nairoby Jiménez	(Dominican Republic) William Cabrera (Dominican Republic) Bermary Polanco
26 November	Dominican Open: Host: Santo Domingo, Dominican Republic; Venue: Tennis Table Pavilion; Level: Future Series; Prize: $6,000; Format: 32MS/32WS/16MD/16WD/16XD	Score: 21–18, 21–23, 21–19	
26 November	Zambia International: Host: Lusaka, Zambia; Venue: Olympic Youth Development Centre; Level: Future Series; Prize: TBC; Format: 32MS/32WS/32MD/16WD/32XD	(Azerbaijan) Ade Resky Dwicahyo	(Nigeria) Anuoluwapo Juwon Opeyori
26 November	Zambia International: Host: Lusaka, Zambia; Venue: Olympic Youth Development Centre; Level: Future Series; Prize: TBC; Format: 32MS/32WS/32MD/16WD/32XD	Score: 21–11, 22–20	
26 November	Zambia International: Host: Lusaka, Zambia; Venue: Olympic Youth Development Centre; Level: Future Series; Prize: TBC; Format: 32MS/32WS/32MD/16WD/32XD	(Nigeria) Dorcas Ajoke Adesokan	(Zambia) Ogar Siamupangila
26 November	Zambia International: Host: Lusaka, Zambia; Venue: Olympic Youth Development Centre; Level: Future Series; Prize: TBC; Format: 32MS/32WS/32MD/16WD/32XD	Score: 21–18, 21–15	
26 November	Zambia International: Host: Lusaka, Zambia; Venue: Olympic Youth Development Centre; Level: Future Series; Prize: TBC; Format: 32MS/32WS/32MD/16WD/32XD	(Azerbaijan) Ade Resky Dwicahyo (Azerbaijan) Azmy Qowimuramadhoni	(Nigeria) Godwin Olofua (Nigeria) Anuoluwapo Juwon Opeyori
26 November	Zambia International: Host: Lusaka, Zambia; Venue: Olympic Youth Development Centre; Level: Future Series; Prize: TBC; Format: 32MS/32WS/32MD/16WD/32XD	Score: 21–19, 18–21, 21–11	
26 November	Zambia International: Host: Lusaka, Zambia; Venue: Olympic Youth Development Centre; Level: Future Series; Prize: TBC; Format: 32MS/32WS/32MD/16WD/32XD	(Zambia) Evelyn Siamupangila (Zambia) Ogar Siamupangila	(Uganda) Gladys Mbabazi (Uganda) Aisha Nakiyemba
26 November	Zambia International: Host: Lusaka, Zambia; Venue: Olympic Youth Development Centre; Level: Future Series; Prize: TBC; Format: 32MS/32WS/32MD/16WD/32XD	Score: 21–12, 21–19	
26 November	Zambia International: Host: Lusaka, Zambia; Venue: Olympic Youth Development Centre; Level: Future Series; Prize: TBC; Format: 32MS/32WS/32MD/16WD/32XD	(Nigeria) Anuoluwapo Juwon Opeyori (Nigeria) Dorcas Ajoke Adesokan	(Jordan) Bahaedeen Ahmad Alshannik (Jordan) Domou Amro
26 November	Zambia International: Host: Lusaka, Zambia; Venue: Olympic Youth Development Centre; Level: Future Series; Prize: TBC; Format: 32MS/32WS/32MD/16WD/32XD	Score: 21–19, 23–21	

=== December ===
Week commencing	Tournament	Champions	Runners-up
3 December	Nepal International: Host: Kathmandu, Nepal; Venue: National Sports council; Level: International Series; Prize: $10,000; Format: 64MS/32WS/32MD/16WD/32XD	(Thailand) Kunlavut Vitidsarn	(Malaysia) Soo Teck Zhi
3 December	Nepal International: Host: Kathmandu, Nepal; Venue: National Sports council; Level: International Series; Prize: $10,000; Format: 64MS/32WS/32MD/16WD/32XD	Score: 20–22, 22–20, 21–9	
3 December	Nepal International: Host: Kathmandu, Nepal; Venue: National Sports council; Level: International Series; Prize: $10,000; Format: 64MS/32WS/32MD/16WD/32XD	(Thailand) Chananchida Jucharoen	(Myanmar) Thet Htar Thuzar
3 December	Nepal International: Host: Kathmandu, Nepal; Venue: National Sports council; Level: International Series; Prize: $10,000; Format: 64MS/32WS/32MD/16WD/32XD	Score: 21–18, 10–21, 21–17	
3 December	Nepal International: Host: Kathmandu, Nepal; Venue: National Sports council; Level: International Series; Prize: $10,000; Format: 64MS/32WS/32MD/16WD/32XD	(Thailand) Supak Jomkoh (Thailand) Wachirawit Sothon	(Thailand) Warit Sarapat (Thailand) Panachai Worasaktayanan
3 December	Nepal International: Host: Kathmandu, Nepal; Venue: National Sports council; Level: International Series; Prize: $10,000; Format: 64MS/32WS/32MD/16WD/32XD	Score: 21–11, 21–15	
3 December	Nepal International: Host: Kathmandu, Nepal; Venue: National Sports council; Level: International Series; Prize: $10,000; Format: 64MS/32WS/32MD/16WD/32XD	(India) Aparna Balan (India) Sruthi K.P	(Sri Lanka) Thilini Hendahewa (Sri Lanka) Kavidi Sirimannage
3 December	Nepal International: Host: Kathmandu, Nepal; Venue: National Sports council; Level: International Series; Prize: $10,000; Format: 64MS/32WS/32MD/16WD/32XD	Score: 21–16, 21–13	
3 December	Nepal International: Host: Kathmandu, Nepal; Venue: National Sports council; Level: International Series; Prize: $10,000; Format: 64MS/32WS/32MD/16WD/32XD	(Thailand) Supak Jomkoh (Thailand) Supissara Paewsampran	(Thailand) Panachai Worasaktayanan (Thailand) Pitchayanin Ungka
3 December	Nepal International: Host: Kathmandu, Nepal; Venue: National Sports council; Level: International Series; Prize: $10,000; Format: 64MS/32WS/32MD/16WD/32XD	Score: 19–21, 21–15, 21–14	
3 December	El Salvador International: Host: San Salvador, El Salvador; Venue: San Salvador; Level: Future Series; Prize: TBC; Format: 32MS/32WS/32MD/16WD/32XD	(Canada) Brian Yang	(Guatemala) Heymard Humblers
3 December	El Salvador International: Host: San Salvador, El Salvador; Venue: San Salvador; Level: Future Series; Prize: TBC; Format: 32MS/32WS/32MD/16WD/32XD	Score: 21–11, 18–21, 21–16	
3 December	El Salvador International: Host: San Salvador, El Salvador; Venue: San Salvador; Level: Future Series; Prize: TBC; Format: 32MS/32WS/32MD/16WD/32XD	(Peru) Daniela Macías	(Brazil) Fabiana Silva
3 December	El Salvador International: Host: San Salvador, El Salvador; Venue: San Salvador; Level: Future Series; Prize: TBC; Format: 32MS/32WS/32MD/16WD/32XD	Score: 21–16, 21–14	
3 December	El Salvador International: Host: San Salvador, El Salvador; Venue: San Salvador; Level: Future Series; Prize: TBC; Format: 32MS/32WS/32MD/16WD/32XD	(Guatemala) Rubén Castellanos (Guatemala) Aníbal Marroquín	(Guatemala) Brandon Alvarado (Guatemala) Christopher Martínez
3 December	El Salvador International: Host: San Salvador, El Salvador; Venue: San Salvador; Level: Future Series; Prize: TBC; Format: 32MS/32WS/32MD/16WD/32XD	Score: 17–21, 21–10, 21–16	
3 December	El Salvador International: Host: San Salvador, El Salvador; Venue: San Salvador; Level: Future Series; Prize: TBC; Format: 32MS/32WS/32MD/16WD/32XD	(Peru) Daniela Macías (Peru) Dánica Nishimura	(Guatemala) Diana Corleto (Guatemala) Nikté Sotomayor
3 December	El Salvador International: Host: San Salvador, El Salvador; Venue: San Salvador; Level: Future Series; Prize: TBC; Format: 32MS/32WS/32MD/16WD/32XD	Score: 21–18, 21–14	
3 December	El Salvador International: Host: San Salvador, El Salvador; Venue: San Salvador; Level: Future Series; Prize: TBC; Format: 32MS/32WS/32MD/16WD/32XD	(Canada) Brian Yang (Canada) Catherine Choi	(Guatemala) Aníbal Marroquín (Peru) Dánica Nishimura
3 December	El Salvador International: Host: San Salvador, El Salvador; Venue: San Salvador; Level: Future Series; Prize: TBC; Format: 32MS/32WS/32MD/16WD/32XD	Score: 21–6, 21–7	
3 December	South Africa International: Host: Cape Town, South Africa; Venue: John Tyers Badminton Hall; Level: Future Series; Prize: TBC; Format: 32MS/16WS/16MD/16WD/32XD	(Azerbaijan) Azmy Qowimuramadhoni	(Azerbaijan) Ade Resky Dwicahyo
3 December	South Africa International: Host: Cape Town, South Africa; Venue: John Tyers Badminton Hall; Level: Future Series; Prize: TBC; Format: 32MS/16WS/16MD/16WD/32XD	Score: 17–21, 23–21, 23–21	
3 December	South Africa International: Host: Cape Town, South Africa; Venue: John Tyers Badminton Hall; Level: Future Series; Prize: TBC; Format: 32MS/16WS/16MD/16WD/32XD	(Nigeria) Dorcas Ajoke Adesokan	(Jordan) Domou Amro
3 December	South Africa International: Host: Cape Town, South Africa; Venue: John Tyers Badminton Hall; Level: Future Series; Prize: TBC; Format: 32MS/16WS/16MD/16WD/32XD	Score: 22–20, 21–12	
3 December	South Africa International: Host: Cape Town, South Africa; Venue: John Tyers Badminton Hall; Level: Future Series; Prize: TBC; Format: 32MS/16WS/16MD/16WD/32XD	(Azerbaijan) Ade Resky Dwicahyo (Azerbaijan) Azmy Qowimuramadhoni	(South Africa) Jarred Elliott (South Africa) Sean Noone
3 December	South Africa International: Host: Cape Town, South Africa; Venue: John Tyers Badminton Hall; Level: Future Series; Prize: TBC; Format: 32MS/16WS/16MD/16WD/32XD	Score: 21–15, 21–8	
3 December	South Africa International: Host: Cape Town, South Africa; Venue: John Tyers Badminton Hall; Level: Future Series; Prize: TBC; Format: 32MS/16WS/16MD/16WD/32XD	(South Africa) Lehandre Schoeman (South Africa) Johanita Scholtz	(South Africa) Michelle Butler-Emmett (South Africa) Jennifer Fry
3 December	South Africa International: Host: Cape Town, South Africa; Venue: John Tyers Badminton Hall; Level: Future Series; Prize: TBC; Format: 32MS/16WS/16MD/16WD/32XD	Score: 21–17, 21–16	
3 December	South Africa International: Host: Cape Town, South Africa; Venue: John Tyers Badminton Hall; Level: Future Series; Prize: TBC; Format: 32MS/16WS/16MD/16WD/32XD	(South Africa) Andries Malan (South Africa) Jennifer Fry	(Jordan) Bahaedeen Ahmad Alshannik (Jordan) Domou Amro
3 December	South Africa International: Host: Cape Town, South Africa; Venue: John Tyers Badminton Hall; Level: Future Series; Prize: TBC; Format: 32MS/16WS/16MD/16WD/32XD	Score: 21–14, 21–16	
10 December	BWF World Tour Finals (Draw): Host: Guangzhou, China; Venue: Tianhe Gymnasium; Level: World Tour Finals; Prize: $1,500,000; Format: 8MS/8WS/8MD/8WD/8XD	(China) Shi Yuqi	(Japan) Kento Momota
10 December	BWF World Tour Finals (Draw): Host: Guangzhou, China; Venue: Tianhe Gymnasium; Level: World Tour Finals; Prize: $1,500,000; Format: 8MS/8WS/8MD/8WD/8XD	Score: 21–12, 21–11	
10 December	BWF World Tour Finals (Draw): Host: Guangzhou, China; Venue: Tianhe Gymnasium; Level: World Tour Finals; Prize: $1,500,000; Format: 8MS/8WS/8MD/8WD/8XD	(India) P. V. Sindhu	(Japan) Nozomi Okuhara
10 December	BWF World Tour Finals (Draw): Host: Guangzhou, China; Venue: Tianhe Gymnasium; Level: World Tour Finals; Prize: $1,500,000; Format: 8MS/8WS/8MD/8WD/8XD	Score: 21–19, 21–17	
10 December	BWF World Tour Finals (Draw): Host: Guangzhou, China; Venue: Tianhe Gymnasium; Level: World Tour Finals; Prize: $1,500,000; Format: 8MS/8WS/8MD/8WD/8XD	(China) Li Junhui (China) Liu Yuchen	(Japan) Hiroyuki Endo (Japan) Yuta Watanabe
10 December	BWF World Tour Finals (Draw): Host: Guangzhou, China; Venue: Tianhe Gymnasium; Level: World Tour Finals; Prize: $1,500,000; Format: 8MS/8WS/8MD/8WD/8XD	Score: 21–15, 21–11	
10 December	BWF World Tour Finals (Draw): Host: Guangzhou, China; Venue: Tianhe Gymnasium; Level: World Tour Finals; Prize: $1,500,000; Format: 8MS/8WS/8MD/8WD/8XD	(Japan) Misaki Matsutomo (Japan) Ayaka Takahashi	(South Korea) Lee So-hee (South Korea) Shin Seung-chan
10 December	BWF World Tour Finals (Draw): Host: Guangzhou, China; Venue: Tianhe Gymnasium; Level: World Tour Finals; Prize: $1,500,000; Format: 8MS/8WS/8MD/8WD/8XD	Score: 21–12, 22–20	
10 December	BWF World Tour Finals (Draw): Host: Guangzhou, China; Venue: Tianhe Gymnasium; Level: World Tour Finals; Prize: $1,500,000; Format: 8MS/8WS/8MD/8WD/8XD	(China) Wang Yilyu (China) Huang Dongping	(China) Zheng Siwei (China) Huang Yaqiong
10 December	BWF World Tour Finals (Draw): Host: Guangzhou, China; Venue: Tianhe Gymnasium; Level: World Tour Finals; Prize: $1,500,000; Format: 8MS/8WS/8MD/8WD/8XD	Score: 23–21, 16–21, 21–18	
10 December	Bangladesh International: Host: Dhaka, Bangladesh; Venue: Shaheed Tajuddin Ahmed Indoor Stadium; Level: International Challenge; Prize: $25,000; Format: 64MS/32WS/32MD/16WD/32XD	(Malaysia) Soo Teck Zhi	(Vietnam) Phạm Cao Cường
10 December	Bangladesh International: Host: Dhaka, Bangladesh; Venue: Shaheed Tajuddin Ahmed Indoor Stadium; Level: International Challenge; Prize: $25,000; Format: 64MS/32WS/32MD/16WD/32XD	Score: 21–17, 21–17	
10 December	Bangladesh International: Host: Dhaka, Bangladesh; Venue: Shaheed Tajuddin Ahmed Indoor Stadium; Level: International Challenge; Prize: $25,000; Format: 64MS/32WS/32MD/16WD/32XD	(Vietnam) Nguyễn Thùy Linh	(Indonesia) Putri Kusuma Wardani
10 December	Bangladesh International: Host: Dhaka, Bangladesh; Venue: Shaheed Tajuddin Ahmed Indoor Stadium; Level: International Challenge; Prize: $25,000; Format: 64MS/32WS/32MD/16WD/32XD	Score: 21–18, 21–19	
10 December	Bangladesh International: Host: Dhaka, Bangladesh; Venue: Shaheed Tajuddin Ahmed Indoor Stadium; Level: International Challenge; Prize: $25,000; Format: 64MS/32WS/32MD/16WD/32XD	(Indonesia) Leo Rolly Carnando (Indonesia) Daniel Marthin	(Thailand) Supak Jomkoh (Thailand) Wachirawit Sothon
10 December	Bangladesh International: Host: Dhaka, Bangladesh; Venue: Shaheed Tajuddin Ahmed Indoor Stadium; Level: International Challenge; Prize: $25,000; Format: 64MS/32WS/32MD/16WD/32XD	Score: 21–16, 21–11	
10 December	Bangladesh International: Host: Dhaka, Bangladesh; Venue: Shaheed Tajuddin Ahmed Indoor Stadium; Level: International Challenge; Prize: $25,000; Format: 64MS/32WS/32MD/16WD/32XD	(Malaysia) Vivian Hoo Kah Mun (Malaysia) Yap Cheng Wen	(India) Aparna Balan (India) Sruthi K.P
10 December	Bangladesh International: Host: Dhaka, Bangladesh; Venue: Shaheed Tajuddin Ahmed Indoor Stadium; Level: International Challenge; Prize: $25,000; Format: 64MS/32WS/32MD/16WD/32XD	Score: 21–14, 21–13	
10 December	Bangladesh International: Host: Dhaka, Bangladesh; Venue: Shaheed Tajuddin Ahmed Indoor Stadium; Level: International Challenge; Prize: $25,000; Format: 64MS/32WS/32MD/16WD/32XD	(Indonesia) Leo Rolly Carnando (Indonesia) Indah Cahya Sari Jamil	(Malaysia) Hoo Pang Ron (Malaysia) Cheah Yee See
10 December	Bangladesh International: Host: Dhaka, Bangladesh; Venue: Shaheed Tajuddin Ahmed Indoor Stadium; Level: International Challenge; Prize: $25,000; Format: 64MS/32WS/32MD/16WD/32XD	Score: 21–16, 21–15	
10 December	Italian International: Host: Milan, Italy; Venue: PalaBadminton; Level: International Challenge; Prize: $25,000; Format: 32MS/32WS/32MD/32WD/32XD	(Denmark) Victor Svendsen	(France) Thomas Rouxel
10 December	Italian International: Host: Milan, Italy; Venue: PalaBadminton; Level: International Challenge; Prize: $25,000; Format: 32MS/32WS/32MD/32WD/32XD	Score: 21–12, 21–17	
10 December	Italian International: Host: Milan, Italy; Venue: PalaBadminton; Level: International Challenge; Prize: $25,000; Format: 32MS/32WS/32MD/32WD/32XD	(Denmark) Julie Dawall Jakobsen	(Germany) Yvonne Li
10 December	Italian International: Host: Milan, Italy; Venue: PalaBadminton; Level: International Challenge; Prize: $25,000; Format: 32MS/32WS/32MD/32WD/32XD	Score: 21–17, 21–17	
10 December	Italian International: Host: Milan, Italy; Venue: PalaBadminton; Level: International Challenge; Prize: $25,000; Format: 32MS/32WS/32MD/32WD/32XD	(Denmark) Mathias Bay-Smidt (Denmark) Lasse Mølhede	(Russia) Vitalij Durkin (Russia) Nikolai Ukk
10 December	Italian International: Host: Milan, Italy; Venue: PalaBadminton; Level: International Challenge; Prize: $25,000; Format: 32MS/32WS/32MD/32WD/32XD	Score: 21–11, 21–11	
10 December	Italian International: Host: Milan, Italy; Venue: PalaBadminton; Level: International Challenge; Prize: $25,000; Format: 32MS/32WS/32MD/32WD/32XD	(Russia) Ekaterina Bolotova (Russia) Alina Davletova	(Denmark) Julie Finne-Ipsen (Denmark) Mai Surrow
10 December	Italian International: Host: Milan, Italy; Venue: PalaBadminton; Level: International Challenge; Prize: $25,000; Format: 32MS/32WS/32MD/32WD/32XD	Score: 21–13, 14–21, 21–13	
10 December	Italian International: Host: Milan, Italy; Venue: PalaBadminton; Level: International Challenge; Prize: $25,000; Format: 32MS/32WS/32MD/32WD/32XD	(Russia) Rodion Alimov (Russia) Alina Davletova	(Russia) Evgenij Dremin (Russia) Evgenia Dimova
10 December	Italian International: Host: Milan, Italy; Venue: PalaBadminton; Level: International Challenge; Prize: $25,000; Format: 32MS/32WS/32MD/32WD/32XD	Score: 21–13, 21–16	
17 December	U.S. International: Host: Orange County, California, United States; Venue: Orange County Badminton Club; Level: International Challenge; Prize: $25,000; Format: 32MS/32WS/32MD/32WD/32XD	(Japan) Koki Watanabe	(Japan) Kodai Naraoka
17 December	U.S. International: Host: Orange County, California, United States; Venue: Orange County Badminton Club; Level: International Challenge; Prize: $25,000; Format: 32MS/32WS/32MD/32WD/32XD	Score: 21–14, 14–21, 21–15	
17 December	U.S. International: Host: Orange County, California, United States; Venue: Orange County Badminton Club; Level: International Challenge; Prize: $25,000; Format: 32MS/32WS/32MD/32WD/32XD	(Japan) Aya Ohori	(Canada) Talia Ng
17 December	U.S. International: Host: Orange County, California, United States; Venue: Orange County Badminton Club; Level: International Challenge; Prize: $25,000; Format: 32MS/32WS/32MD/32WD/32XD	Score: 21–6, 21–7	
17 December	U.S. International: Host: Orange County, California, United States; Venue: Orange County Badminton Club; Level: International Challenge; Prize: $25,000; Format: 32MS/32WS/32MD/32WD/32XD	(Chinese Taipei) Lu Chia-hung (Chinese Taipei) Lu Chia-pin	(United States) Phillip Chew (United States) Ryan Chew
17 December	U.S. International: Host: Orange County, California, United States; Venue: Orange County Badminton Club; Level: International Challenge; Prize: $25,000; Format: 32MS/32WS/32MD/32WD/32XD	Score: 21–18, 21–10	
17 December	U.S. International: Host: Orange County, California, United States; Venue: Orange County Badminton Club; Level: International Challenge; Prize: $25,000; Format: 32MS/32WS/32MD/32WD/32XD	(Canada) Rachel Honderich (Canada) Kristen Tsai	(Chinese Taipei) Hung Shih-han (Chinese Taipei) Yu Chien-hui
17 December	U.S. International: Host: Orange County, California, United States; Venue: Orange County Badminton Club; Level: International Challenge; Prize: $25,000; Format: 32MS/32WS/32MD/32WD/32XD	Score: 21–19, 21–15	
17 December	U.S. International: Host: Orange County, California, United States; Venue: Orange County Badminton Club; Level: International Challenge; Prize: $25,000; Format: 32MS/32WS/32MD/32WD/32XD	(Japan) Kohei Gondo (Japan) Ayane Kurihara	(Thailand) Natchanon Tulamok (Thailand) Natcha Saengchote
17 December	U.S. International: Host: Orange County, California, United States; Venue: Orange County Badminton Club; Level: International Challenge; Prize: $25,000; Format: 32MS/32WS/32MD/32WD/32XD	Score: 21–7, 21–16	
17 December	Turkey International: Host: Ankara, Turkey; Venue: Turkey Olympic Center; Level: International Series; Prize: $10,000; Format: 32MS/32WS/32MD/32WD/32XD	(Indonesia) Ikhsan Rumbay	(Turkey) Emre Lale
17 December	Turkey International: Host: Ankara, Turkey; Venue: Turkey Olympic Center; Level: International Series; Prize: $10,000; Format: 32MS/32WS/32MD/32WD/32XD	Score: 21–9, 21–14	
17 December	Turkey International: Host: Ankara, Turkey; Venue: Turkey Olympic Center; Level: International Series; Prize: $10,000; Format: 32MS/32WS/32MD/32WD/32XD	(Turkey) Özge Bayrak	(China) Li Yun
17 December	Turkey International: Host: Ankara, Turkey; Venue: Turkey Olympic Center; Level: International Series; Prize: $10,000; Format: 32MS/32WS/32MD/32WD/32XD	Score: 21–19, 12–21, 21–17	
17 December	Turkey International: Host: Ankara, Turkey; Venue: Turkey Olympic Center; Level: International Series; Prize: $10,000; Format: 32MS/32WS/32MD/32WD/32XD	(Indonesia) Leo Rolly Carnando (Indonesia) Daniel Marthin	(England) Peter Briggs (England) Gregory Mairs
17 December	Turkey International: Host: Ankara, Turkey; Venue: Turkey Olympic Center; Level: International Series; Prize: $10,000; Format: 32MS/32WS/32MD/32WD/32XD	Score: 21–14, 13–21, 23–21	
17 December	Turkey International: Host: Ankara, Turkey; Venue: Turkey Olympic Center; Level: International Series; Prize: $10,000; Format: 32MS/32WS/32MD/32WD/32XD	(Indonesia) Nita Violina Marwah (Indonesia) Putri Syaikah	(Indonesia) Metya Inayah Cindiani (Indonesia) Indah Cahya Sari Jamil
17 December	Turkey International: Host: Ankara, Turkey; Venue: Turkey Olympic Center; Level: International Series; Prize: $10,000; Format: 32MS/32WS/32MD/32WD/32XD	Score: 21–15, 21–7	
17 December	Turkey International: Host: Ankara, Turkey; Venue: Turkey Olympic Center; Level: International Series; Prize: $10,000; Format: 32MS/32WS/32MD/32WD/32XD	(Singapore) Danny Bawa Chrisnanta (Singapore) Tan Wei Han	(Indonesia) Leo Rolly Carnando (Indonesia) Indah Cahya Sari Jamil
17 December	Turkey International: Host: Ankara, Turkey; Venue: Turkey Olympic Center; Level: International Series; Prize: $10,000; Format: 32MS/32WS/32MD/32WD/32XD	Score: 21–19, 16–21, 21–12	

== BWF Gala Awards Night ==
The followings are the nominees and the winners of the 2018 BWF Gala Awards Night. Winners are marked in bold.

Player of the Year
Male Player of the Year	Female player of the Year
(Indonesia) **Marcus Fernaldi Gideon** / **Kevin Sanjaya Sukamuljo** (Men's doubles); (Japan) Kento Momota (Men's singles); (China) Zheng Siwei (Mixed doubles)	(China) **Huang Yaqiong** (Mixed doubles); (Chinese Taipei) Tai Tzu-ying (Women's singles); (Japan) Yuki Fukushima / Sayaka Hirota (Women's doubles)
Most Promising Player of the Year
(China) **Han Chengkai** / **Zhou Haodong** (Men's doubles); (Indonesia) Apriyani Rahayu (Women's doubles); (China) He Jiting (Men's doubles & Mixed doubles); (Indonesia) Gregoria Mariska Tunjung (Women's singles); (Malaysia) Goh Jin Wei (Women's singles)
Most Improved Player of the Year
(Japan) **Mayu Matsumoto** / **Wakana Nagahara** (Women's doubles); (South Korea) Seo Seung-jae (Men's doubles & Mixed doubles); (India) Satwiksairaj Rankireddy / Chirag Shetty (Men's doubles); (China) He Jiting (Men's doubles & Mixed doubles); (Indonesia) Anthony Sinisuka Ginting (Men's singles)
Para-badminton Player of the Year
Male Para-badminton Player of the Year	Female Para-badminton Player of the Year
(England) **Jack Shephard**; (France) Lucas Mazur; (Malaysia) Cheah Liek Hou	(Indonesia) **Leani Ratri Oktila**; (Thailand) Sujirat Pookkham; (Japan) Yuma Yamazaki
