= Sania Mirza career statistics =

Statistics of professional tennis player

Career finals
Discipline	Type	Won	Lost	Total
Singles	Grand Slam	–	–	–
Singles	Summer Olympics	–	–	–
Singles	WTA Finals (Note: Formerly known as: Virginia Slims Championships (until 1995); WTA Tour Championships (until 2014))	–	–	–
Singles	WTA 1000 (Note: Formerly known as: Category 4 & 5 & 6 (until 1990); Tier I (until 2009); WTA Premier Mandatory and 5 (until 2021))	–	–	–
Singles	WTA 500 (Note: Formerly known as: Category 3 (until 1990); Tier II (until 2009); WTA Premier (until 2021))	0	1	1
Singles	WTA 250 (Note: Formerly known as: Category 1 & 2 (until 1990); Tier III & IV & V (until 2009); WTA International (until 2021))	1	2	3
Singles	Total	1	3	4
Doubles	Grand Slam	3	1	4
Doubles	Summer Olympics	–	–	–
Doubles	WTA Finals	2	0	2
Doubles	WTA 1000	9	9	18
Doubles	WTA 500	17	8	25
Doubles	WTA 250	12	5	17
Doubles	Total	43	23	66
Mixed doubles	Grand Slam	3	5	8
Mixed doubles	Total	3	5	8
Total		47	31	78

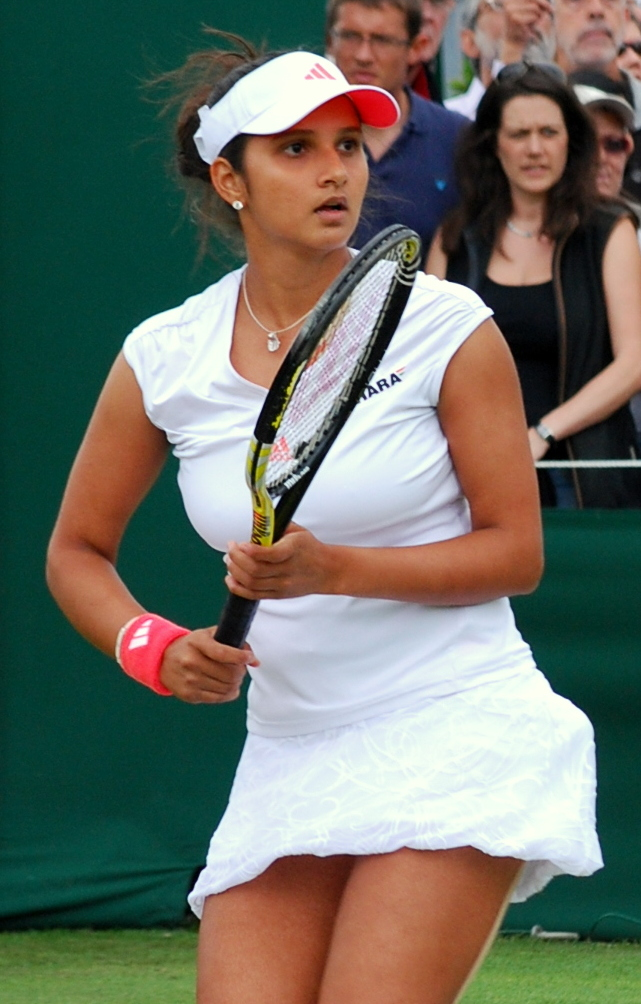
Mirza at the 2011 Wimbledon Championships

This is a list of the main career statistics of Indian professional tennis player Sania Mirza.

== Performance timelines ==
Key
W	F	SF	QF	#R	RR	Q#	P#	DNQ	A	Z#	PO	G	S	B	NMS	NTI	P	NH

(W) winner; (F) finalist; (SF) semifinalist; (QF) quarterfinalist; (#R) rounds 4, 3, 2, 1; (RR) round-robin stage; (Q#) qualification round; (P#) preliminary round; (DNQ) did not qualify; (A) absent; (Z#) Davis/Fed Cup Zonal Group (with number indication) or (PO) play-off; (G) gold, (S) silver or (B) bronze Olympic/Paralympic medal; (NMS) not a Masters tournament; (NTI) not a Tier I tournament; (P) postponed; (NH) not held; (SR) strike rate (events won / competed); (W–L) win–loss record.
To avoid confusion and double counting, these charts are updated at the conclusion of a tournament or when the player's participation has ended.

=== Singles ===
Tournament	2005	2006	2007	2008	2009	2010	2011	2012	W–L
Grand Slam tournaments
Australian Open	3R	2R	2R	3R	2R	1R	1R	1R	7–8
French Open	1R	1R	2R	A	1R	A	2R	A	2–5
Wimbledon	2R	1R	2R	2R	2R	1R	1R	A	4–7
US Open	4R	2R	3R	A	2R	2R	1R	A	8–6
Win–loss	6–4	2–4	5–4	3–2	3–4	1–3	1–4	0–1	21–26
National representation
Olympic Games	not held			1R	not held			A	0–1
Premier Mandatory & Premier 5 / former Tier I tournaments
Dubai / Qatar Open	Tier II			1R	2R	1R	2R	A	2–3
Indian Wells Open	A	2R	A	4R	2R	A	2R	2R	6–5
Miami Open	1R	1R	A	A	1R	A	2R	Q2	1–4
Madrid Open	not held				Q1	A	1R	A	0–1
Canadian Open	A	1R	A	A	Q2	Q1	Q2	A	0–1
Cincinnati Open	Tier III				A	Q1	Q2	A	–
Sn. California Open	3R	3R	QF	not held		Premier			7–3
Zurich Open	A	A	1R	TII	not held				0–1
Kremlin Cup	A	A	1R	A	Premier				0–1
Career statistics									SR
Titles	1	0	0	0	0	0	0	0	1
Finals	2	0	1	0	1	0	0	0	4
Overall win–loss	27–16	22–25	30–20	11–12	17–13	8–10	10–16	4–5	134–123
Win %	63%	47%	60%	48%	57%	44%	38%	44%	52%
Year-end ranking	31	66	32	99	58	166	88	–	N/A

=== Doubles ===
Tournament	2003	2004	2005	2006	2007	2008	2009	2010	2011	2012	2013	2014	2015	2016	2017	...	2020	2021	2022	2023	SR	W–L	Win%
Grand Slam tournaments
Australian Open	A	A	A	1R	3R	3R	1R	3R	1R	SF	1R	QF	2R	W	3R		1R	A	1R	2R	1 / 15	23–14	62%
French Open	A	A	2R	3R	1R	A	2R	A	F	1R	3R	QF	QF	3R	1R		A	A	3R	A	0 / 12	21–12	64%
Wimbledon	A	Q1	1R	2R	3R	QF	2R	2R	SF	3R	3R	2R	W	QF	3R		NH	2R	1R	A	1 / 15	29–14	67%
US Open	A	A	1R	3R	QF	A	2R	1R	3R	3R	SF	SF	W	QF	SF		A	1R	A	A	1 / 13	31–12	72%
Win–loss	0–0	0–0	1–3	5–4	7–4	5–2	3–4	3–3	11–4	8–4	8–4	11–4	16–2	14–3	8–4		0–1	1–2	2–3	1–1	3 / 55	104–52	67%
Year-end championships
WTA Finals	did not qualify											W	W	SF	A		NH	did not qualify			2 / 3	9–1	90%
National representation
Summer Olympics	NH	A	not held			2R	not held			1R	not held			1R	not held			1R	not held		0 / 4	1–4	20%
WTA 1000 + former tournaments
Dubai / Qatar Open	not Tier I					A	2R	1R	QF	2R	1R	QF	2R	QF	SF		1R	2R	SF	1R	0 / 13	11–13	46%
Indian Wells Open	A	A	A	QF	A	SF	1R	A	W	F	1R	F	W	2R	QF		NH	1R	2R	A	2 / 12	27–10	73%
Miami Open	A	A	A	QF	A	A	SF	A	2R	1R	QF	SF	W	2R	F		NH	A	QF	A	1 / 10	23–9	72%
Madrid Open	not held						SF	A	QF	1R	1R	QF	QF	F	QF		NH	A	A	A	0 / 8	12–8	60%
Italian Open	A	A	A	A	A	A	A	A	A	2R	QF	QF	F	W	SF		A	A	SF	A	1 / 7	17–6	74%
Canadian Open	A	A	A	1R	A	A	A	A	1R	QF	2R	F	SF	QF	QF		NH	A	SF	A	0 / 9	14–8	64%
Cincinnati Open	NH	Tier III					2R	QF	A	1R	1R	2R	SF	W	SF		A	2R	2R	A	1 / 10	15–9	63%
Pan Pacific / Wuhan Open	A	A	A	A	A	A	A	A	A	1R	W	A	W	F	SF		NH				2 / 5	13–3	81%
China Open	NH	Tier II					1R	A	A	F	W	F	W	2R	SF		NH				2 / 7	19–5	79%
Former Tier I
San Diego	T II	A	A	QF	2R	not held/not Tier I															0 / 2	3–2	60%
Zurich	A	A	A	A	1R	not held/not Tier I															0 / 1	0–1	0%
Moscow	A	A	A	A	QF	A	not held/not Tier I														0 / 1	1–1	50%
Career statistics
	2003	2004	2005	2006	2007	2008	2009	2010	2011	2012	2013	2014	2015	2016	2017	...	2020	2021	2022	2023	Career		
Tournaments	1	1	10	18	16	9	16	10	17	26	21	22	22	23	21		4	11	16	4	257		
Titles	0	1	0	2	4	0	1	1	3	2	5	3	10	8	1		1	1	0	0	43		
Finals	0	1	0	5	5	0	1	1	4	5	6	7	12	11	3		1	2	2	0	66		
Overall win–loss	1–1	4–0	10–10	31–16	33–12	12–9	19–15	12–9	34–14	36–24	43–16	47–19	65–12	58–15	37–18		5–3	12–10	26–16	1–4	486–223		
Win %	50%	100%	50%	66%	73%	57%	56%	57%	71%	60%	73%	71%	84%	79%	67%		63%	55%	62%	20%	69%		
Year-end ranking	346	178	111	24	18	61	37	61	11	12	9	6	1	1	12		237	62	24	—N/a	$ 7,265,246		

=== Mixed doubles ===
Tournament	2005	2006	2007	2008	2009	2010	2011	2012	2013	2014	2015	2016	2017	...	2021	2022	2023	SR	W–L
Australian Open	A	1R	1R	F	W	A	A	SF	QF	F	SF	SF	F		A	QF	F	1 / 12	32–11
French Open	A	1R	2R	A	1R	A	1R	W	1R	2R	1R	F	QF		A	2R	A	1 / 11	17–10
Wimbledon	2R	3R	2R	2R	3R	A	QF	2R	QF	3R	QF	2R	3R		3R	SF	A	0 / 14	28–14
US Open	A	1R	QF	A	2R	A	1R	QF	1R	W	1R	2R	1R		1R	A	A	1 / 11	14–10
National representation
Summer Olympics	not held							QF	not held			4th	NH		A	NH		0 / 2	2–2

== Grand Slam finals ==
=== Doubles: 4 (3 titles, 1 runner-up) ===
Result	Year	Championship	Surface	Partner	Opponents	Score
Loss	2011	French Open	Clay	(Russia) Elena Vesnina	(Czech Republic) Andrea Hlaváčková (Czech Republic) Lucie Hradecká	4–6, 3–6
Win	2015	Wimbledon	Grass	(Switzerland) Martina Hingis	(Russia) Ekaterina Makarova (Russia) Elena Vesnina	5–7, 7–6^{(4)}, 7–5
Win	2015	US Open	Hard	(Switzerland) Martina Hingis	(Australia) Casey Dellacqua; (Kazakhstan) Yaroslava Shvedova	6–3, 6–3
Win	2016	Australian Open	Hard	(Switzerland) Martina Hingis	(Czech Republic) Andrea Hlaváčková (Czech Republic) Lucie Hradecká	7–6^{(1)}, 6–3

=== Mixed doubles: 8 (3 titles, 5 runner-ups) ===
Result	Year	Championship	Surface	Partner	Opponents	Score
Loss	2008	Australian Open	Hard	(India) Mahesh Bhupathi	(China) Sun Tiantian (Serbia) Nenad Zimonjić	6–7^{(4)}, 4–6
Win	2009	Australian Open	Hard	(India) Mahesh Bhupathi	(France) Nathalie Dechy (Israel) Andy Ram	6–3, 6–1
Win	2012	French Open	Clay	(India) Mahesh Bhupathi	(Poland) Klaudia Jans-Ignacik (Mexico) Santiago González	7–6^{(3)}, 6–1
Loss	2014	Australian Open	Hard	(Romania) Horia Tecău	(France) Kristina Mladenovic (Canada) Daniel Nestor	3–6, 2–6
Win	2014	US Open	Hard	(Brazil) Bruno Soares	(United States) Abigail Spears (Mexico) Santiago González	6–1, 2–6, [11–9]
Loss	2016	French Open	Clay	(Croatia) Ivan Dodig	(Switzerland) Martina Hingis (India) Leander Paes	6–4, 4–6, [8–10]
Loss	2017	Australian Open	Hard	(Croatia) Ivan Dodig	(United States) Abigail Spears (Colombia) Juan Sebastián Cabal	2–6, 4–6
Loss	2023	Australian Open	Hard	(India) Rohan Bopanna	(Brazil) Luisa Stefani (Brazil) Rafael Matos	6–7^{(2–7)}, 2–6

== Other significant finals ==
=== Olympic Games ===
==== Mixed doubles ====
Result	Year	Tournament	Surface	Partner	Opponents	Score
4th place	2016	Rio Summer Olympics	Hard	(India) Rohan Bopanna	(Czech Republic) Lucie Hradecká; (Czech Republic) Radek Štěpánek	1–6, 5–7

=== WTA Finals ===
==== Doubles: 2 (2 titles) ====
Result	Year	Tournament	Surface	Partner	Opponents	Score
Win	2014	WTA Finals, Singapore	Hard (i)	(Zimbabwe) Cara Black	(Chinese Taipei) Hsieh Su-wei; (China) Peng Shuai	6–1, 6–0
Win	2015	WTA Finals, Singapore	Hard (i)	(Switzerland) Martina Hingis	(Spain) Garbiñe Muguruza; (Spain) Carla Suárez Navarro	6–0, 6–3

=== WTA 1000 ===
==== Doubles: 18 (9 titles, 9 runner-ups) ====
Result	Year	Tournament	Surface	Partner	Opponents	Score
Win	2011	Indian Wells Open	Hard	(Russia) Elena Vesnina	(United States) Bethanie Mattek-Sands (United States) Meghann Shaughnessy	6–0, 7–5
Loss	2012	Indian Wells Open	Hard	(Russia) Elena Vesnina	(United States) Liezel Huber (United States) Lisa Raymond	2–6, 3–6
Loss	2012	China Open	Hard	(Spain) Nuria Llagostera Vives	(Russia) Ekaterina Makarova (Russia) Elena Vesnina	5–7, 5–7
Win	2013	Pan Pacific Open	Hard	(Zimbabwe) Cara Black	(Chinese Taipei) Chan Hao-ching (United States) Liezel Huber	4–6, 6–0, [11–9]
Win	2013	China Open	Hard	(Zimbabwe) Cara Black	(Russia) Vera Dushevina; (Spain) Arantxa Parra Santonja	6–2, 6–2
Loss	2014	Indian Wells Open	Hard	(Zimbabwe) Cara Black	(Chinese Taipei) Hsieh Su-wei (China) Peng Shuai	6–7^{(5–7)}, 2–6
Loss	2014	Canadian Open	Hard	(Zimbabwe) Cara Black	(Italy) Sara Errani (Italy) Roberta Vinci	6–7^{(4–7)}, 3–6
Loss	2014	China Open	Hard	(Zimbabwe) Cara Black	(Czech Republic) Andrea Hlaváčková; (China) Peng Shuai	4–6, 4–6
Win	2015	Indian Wells Open (2)	Hard	(Switzerland) Martina Hingis	(Russia) Ekaterina Makarova (Russia) Elena Vesnina	6–3, 6–4
Win	2015	Miami Open	Hard	(Switzerland) Martina Hingis	(Russia) Ekaterina Makarova (Russia) Elena Vesnina	7–5, 6–1
Loss	2015	Italian Open	Clay	(Switzerland) Martina Hingis	(Hungary) Tímea Babos (France) Kristina Mladenovic	4–6, 3–6
Win	2015	Wuhan Open	Hard	(Switzerland) Martina Hingis	(Romania) Irina-Camelia Begu (Romania) Monica Niculescu	6–2, 6–3
Win	2015	China Open (2)	Hard	(Switzerland) Martina Hingis	(Chinese Taipei) Chan Yung-jan (Chinese Taipei) Chan Hao-ching	6–7^{(9–11)}, 6–1, [10–8]
Loss	2016	Madrid Open	Clay	(Switzerland) Martina Hingis	(France) Caroline Garcia; (France) Kristina Mladenovic	4–6, 4–6
Win	2016	Italian Open	Clay	(Switzerland) Martina Hingis	(Russia) Ekaterina Makarova (Russia) Elena Vesnina	6–1, 6–7^{(5–7)}, [10–3]
Win	2016	Cincinnati Open	Hard	(Czech Republic) Barbora Strýcová	(Switzerland) Martina Hingis (United States) CoCo Vandeweghe	7–5, 6–4
Loss	2016	Wuhan Open	Hard	(Czech Republic) Barbora Strýcová	(United States) Bethanie Mattek-Sands (Czech Republic) Lucie Šafářová	1–6, 4–6
Loss	2017	Miami Open	Hard	(Czech Republic) Barbora Strýcová	(Canada) Gabriela Dabrowski (China) Xu Yifan	4–6, 3–6

== WTA Tour finals ==
=== Singles: 4 (1 title, 3 runner-ups) ===
Winner – Legend
Grand Slam tournaments
Tier I
Tier II (0–1)
Tier III, IV & V (1–2)

Finals by surface
Hard (1–3)
Grass (0–0)
Clay (0–0)
Carpet (0–0)

Result	W–L	Date	Tournament	Tier	Surface	Opponent	Score
Win	1–0	Feb 2005	Hyderabad Open, India	Tier IV	Hard	(Ukraine) Alona Bondarenko	6–4, 5–7, 6–3
Loss	1–1	Aug 2005	Forest Hills Classic, United States	Tier IV	Hard	(Czech Republic) Lucie Šafářová	6–3, 5–7, 4–6
Loss	1–2	Jul 2007	Silicon Valley Classic, United States	Tier II	Hard	(Russia) Anna Chakvetadze	3–6, 2–6
Loss	1–3	Feb 2009	PTT Pattaya Open, Thailand	International	Hard	(Russia) Vera Zvonareva	5–7, 1–6

=== Doubles: 66 (43 titles, 23 runner-ups) ===
Winner – Legend (pre/post 2010)
Grand Slam tournaments (3–1)
WTA Tour Championships (2–0)
Tier I / Premier M & Premier 5 / WTA 1000 (9–9)
Tier II / Premier / WTA 500 (17–8)
Tier III, IV & V / International / WTA 250 (12–5)

Finals by surface
Hard (35–12)
Grass (1–0)
Clay (7–11)
Carpet (0–0)

Result	W–L	Date	Tournament	Tier	Surface	Partner	Opponents	Score
Win	1–0	Feb 2004	Hyderabad Open, India	Tier IV	Hard	(South Africa) Liezel Huber	(China) Li Ting (China) Sun Tiantian	7–6^{(7–1)}, 6–4
Win	2–0	Feb 2006	Bangalore Open, India	Tier IV	Hard	(South Africa) Liezel Huber	(Russia) Anastasia Rodionova; (Russia) Elena Vesnina	6–3, 6–3
Loss	2–1	Apr 2006	Amelia Island Championships, US	Tier II	Clay	(South Africa) Liezel Huber	(Japan) Shinobu Asagoe (Slovenia) Katarina Srebotnik	2–6, 4–6
Loss	2–2	May 2006	İstanbul Cup, Turkey	Tier III	Clay	(Australia) Alicia Molik	(Ukraine) Alona Bondarenko (Belarus) Anastasiya Yakimova	2–6, 4–6
Loss	2–3	Jul 2006	Cincinnati Open, US	Tier III	Hard	(Poland) Marta; Domachowska	(Italy) Maria Elena Camerin (Argentina) Gisela Dulko	4–6, 6–3, 2–6
Win	3–3	Sep 2006	Sunfeast Open, India	Tier III	Hard (i)	(South Africa) Liezel Huber	(Ukraine) Yuliya Beygelzimer (Ukraine) Yuliana Fedak	6–4, 6–0
Win	4–3	May 2007	Rabat Grand Prix, Morocco	Tier IV	Clay	(United States) Vania King	(Romania) Andreea Ehritt-Vanc (Russia) Anastasia Rodionova	6–1, 6–2
Loss	4–4	May 2007	İstanbul Cup, Turkey	Tier III	Clay	(Chinese Taipei) Chan Yung-jan	(Poland) Agnieszka Radwańska (Poland) Urszula Radwańska	1–6, 3–6
Win	5–4	Jul 2007	Cincinnati Open, US (2)	Tier III	Hard	(United States) Bethanie; Mattek-Sands	(Russia) Alina Jidkova (Belarus) Tatiana Poutchek	7–6^{(7–4)}, 7–5
Win	6–4	Jul 2007	Silicon Valley Classic, US	Tier II	Hard	(Israel) Shahar Pe'er	(Belarus) Victoria Azarenka (Russia) Anna Chakvetadze	6–4, 7–6^{(7–5)}
Win	7–4	Aug 2007	Connecticut Open, US	Tier II	Hard	(Italy) Mara Santangelo	(Zimbabwe) Cara Black (United States) Liezel Huber	6–1, 6–2
Win	8–4	Apr 2009	Amelia Island Championships, US	International	Clay	(Chinese Taipei) Chuang Chia-jung	(Czech Republic) Květa Peschke (United States) Lisa Raymond	6–3, 4–6, [10–7]
Win	9–4	Sep 2010	Guangzhou Open, China	International	Hard	(Romania) Edina Gallovits	(China) Han Xinyun (China) Liu Wanting	7–5, 6–3
Win	10–4	Mar 2011	Indian Wells Open, US	Premier M	Hard	(Russia) Elena Vesnina	(United States) Bethanie Mattek-Sands (United States) Meghann Shaughnessy	6–0, 7–5
Win	11–4	Apr 2011	Charleston Open, US	Premier	Clay (green)	(Russia) Elena Vesnina	(United States) Bethanie Mattek-Sands (United States) Meghann Shaughnessy	6–4, 6–4
Loss	11–5	Jun 2011	French Open	Grand Slam	Clay	(Russia) Elena Vesnina	(Czech Republic) Andrea Hlaváčková (Czech Republic) Lucie Hradecká	4–6, 3–6
Win	12–5	Jul 2011	Washington Open, US	International	Hard	(Kazakhstan) Yaroslava; Shvedova	(Belarus) Olga Govortsova (Russia) Alla Kudryavtseva	6–3, 6–3
Win	13–5	Feb 2012	PTT Pattaya Open, Thailand	International	Hard	(Australia) Anastasia; Rodionova	(Chinese Taipei) Chan Hao-ching (Chinese Taipei) Chan Yung-jan	3–6, 6–1, [10–8]
Loss	13–6	Feb 2012	Dubai Championships, UAE	Premier	Hard	(Russia) Elena Vesnina	(United States) Liezel Huber (United States) Lisa Raymond	2–6, 1–6
Loss	13–7	Mar 2012	Indian Wells Open, US	Premier M	Hard	(Russia) Elena Vesnina	(United States) Liezel Huber (United States) Lisa Raymond	2–6, 3–6
Win	14–7	May 2012	Brussels Open, Belgium	Premier	Clay	(United States) Bethanie; Mattek-Sands	(Poland) Alicja Rosolska; (China) Zheng Jie	6–3, 6–2
Loss	14–8	Oct 2012	China Open	Premier M	Hard	(Spain) Nuria; Llagostera Vives	(Russia) Ekaterina Makarova (Russia) Elena Vesnina	5–7, 5–7
Win	15–8	Jan 2013	Brisbane International, Australia	Premier	Hard	(United States) Bethanie; Mattek-Sands	(Germany) Anna-Lena Grönefeld; (Czech Republic) Květa Peschke	4–6, 6–4, [10–7]
Win	16–8	Feb 2013	Dubai Championships, UAE	Premier	Hard	(United States) Bethanie; Mattek-Sands	(Russia) Nadia Petrova; (Slovenia) Katarina Srebotnik	6–4, 2–6, [10–7]
Loss	16–9	Apr 2013	Stuttgart Open, Germany	Premier	Clay (i)	(United States) Bethanie; Mattek-Sands	(Germany) Mona Barthel; (Germany) Sabine Lisicki	4–6, 5–7
Win	17–9	Aug 2013	Connecticut Open, US (2)	Premier	Hard	(China) Zheng Jie	(Spain) Anabel Medina Garrigues; (Slovenia) Katarina Srebotnik	6–3, 6–4
Win	18–9	Sep 2013	Pan Pacific Open, Japan	Premier 5	Hard	(Zimbabwe) Cara Black	(Chinese Taipei) Chan Hao-ching; (United States) Liezel Huber	4–6, 6–0, [11–9]
Win	19–9	Oct 2013	China Open	Premier M	Hard	(Zimbabwe) Cara Black	(Russia) Vera Dushevina; (Spain) Arantxa Parra Santonja	6–2, 6–2
Loss	19–10	Mar 2014	Indian Wells Open, US	Premier M	Hard	(Zimbabwe) Cara Black	(Chinese Taipei) Hsieh Su-wei; (China) Peng Shuai	6–7^{(5–7)}, 2–6
Loss	19–11	Apr 2014	Stuttgart Open, Germany	Premier	Clay	(Zimbabwe) Cara Black	(Italy) Sara Errani (Italy) Roberta Vinci	2–6, 3–6
Win	20–11	May 2014	Estoril Open, Portugal	International	Clay	(Zimbabwe) Cara Black	(Czech Republic) Eva Hrdinová (Russia) Valeria Solovyeva	6–4, 6–3
Loss	20–12	Aug 2014	Canadian Open	Premier 5	Hard	(Zimbabwe) Cara Black	(Italy) Sara Errani (Italy) Roberta Vinci	6–7^{(4–7)}, 3–6
Win	21–12	Sep 2014	Pan Pacific Open, Japan (2)	Premier	Hard	(Zimbabwe) Cara Black	(Spain) Garbiñe Muguruza (Spain) Carla Suárez Navarro	6–2, 7–5
Loss	21–13	Oct 2014	China Open	Premier M	Hard	(Zimbabwe) Cara Black	(Czech Republic) Andrea Hlaváčková; (China) Peng Shuai	4–6, 4–6
Win	22–13	Oct 2014	WTA Finals, Singapore	WTA Finals	Hard (i)	(Zimbabwe) Cara Black	(Chinese Taipei) Hsieh Su-wei (China) Peng Shuai	6–1, 6–0
Win	23–13	Jan 2015	Sydney International, Australia	Premier	Hard	(United States) Bethanie; Mattek-Sands	(United States) Raquel Kops-Jones (United States) Abigail Spears	6–3, 6–3
Loss	23–14	Feb 2015	Qatar Ladies Open	Premier	Hard	(Chinese Taipei) Hsieh Su-wei	(United States) Raquel Kops-Jones (United States) Abigail Spears	4–6, 4–6
Win	24–14	Mar 2015	Indian Wells Open, US (2)	Premier M	Hard	(Switzerland) Martina Hingis	(Russia) Ekaterina Makarova (Russia) Elena Vesnina	6–3, 6–4
Win	25–14	Apr 2015	Miami Open, US	Premier M	Hard	(Switzerland) Martina Hingis	(Russia) Ekaterina Makarova (Russia) Elena Vesnina	7–5, 6–1
Win	26–14	Apr 2015	Charleston Open, US (2)	Premier	Clay (green)	(Switzerland) Martina Hingis	(Australia) Casey Dellacqua (Croatia) Darija Jurak	6–0, 6–4
Loss	26–15	May 2015	Italian Open	Premier 5	Clay	(Switzerland) Martina Hingis	(Hungary) Tímea Babos (France) Kristina Mladenovic	4–6, 3–6
Win	27–15	Jul 2015	Wimbledon, UK	Grand Slam	Grass	(Switzerland) Martina Hingis	(Russia) Ekaterina Makarova (Russia) Elena Vesnina	5–7, 7–6^{(7–4)}, 7–5
Win	28–15	Sep 2015	US Open	Grand Slam	Hard	(Switzerland) Martina Hingis	(Australia) Casey Dellacqua (Kazakhstan) Yaroslava Shvedova	6–3, 6–3
Win	29–15	Sep 2015	Guangzhou Open, China (2)	International	Hard	(Switzerland) Martina Hingis	(China) Xu Shilin (China) You Xiaodi	6–3, 6–1
Win	30–15	Oct 2015	Wuhan Open, China	Premier 5	Hard	(Switzerland) Martina Hingis	(Romania) Irina-Camelia Begu (Romania) Monica Niculescu	6–2, 6–3
Win	31–15	Oct 2015	China Open (2)	Premier M	Hard	(Switzerland) Martina Hingis	(Chinese Taipei) Chan Hao-ching; (Chinese Taipei) Chan Yung-jan	6–7^{(9–11)}, 6–1, [10–8]
Win	32–15	Nov 2015	WTA Finals, Singapore (2)	WTA Finals	Hard (i)	(Switzerland) Martina Hingis	(Spain) Garbiñe Muguruza (Spain) Carla Suárez Navarro	6–0, 6–3
Win	33–15	Jan 2016	Brisbane International, Australia (2)	Premier	Hard	(Switzerland) Martina Hingis	(Germany) Angelique Kerber (Germany) Andrea Petkovic	7–5, 6–1
Win	34–15	Jan 2016	Sydney International, Australia (2)	Premier	Hard	(Switzerland) Martina Hingis	(France) Caroline Garcia (France) Kristina Mladenovic	1–6, 7–5, [10–5]
Win	35–15	Jan 2016	Australian Open	Grand Slam	Hard	(Switzerland) Martina Hingis	(Czech Republic) Andrea Hlaváčková (Czech Republic) Lucie Hradecká	7–6^{(7–1)}, 6–3
Win	36–15	Feb 2016	St. Petersburg Trophy, Russia	Premier	Hard (i)	(Switzerland) Martina Hingis	(Russia) Vera Dushevina; (Czech Republic) Barbora Krejčíková	6–3, 6–1
Loss	36–16	Apr 2016	Stuttgart Open, Germany	Premier	Clay (i)	(Switzerland) Martina Hingis	(France) Caroline Garcia (France) Kristina Mladenovic	6–2, 1–6, [6–10]
Loss	36–17	May 2016	Madrid Open, Spain	Premier M	Clay	(Switzerland) Martina Hingis	(France) Caroline Garcia (France) Kristina Mladenovic	4–6, 4–6
Win	37–17	May 2016	Italian Open	Premier 5	Clay	(Switzerland) Martina Hingis	(Russia) Ekaterina Makarova (Russia) Elena Vesnina	6–1, 6–7^{(5–7)}, [10–3]
Win	38–17	Aug 2016	Cincinnati Open, US	Premier 5	Hard	(Czech Republic) Barbora Strýcová	(Switzerland) Martina Hingis (United States) CoCo Vandeweghe	7–5, 6–4
Win	39–17	Aug 2016	Connecticut Open, US (3)	Premier	Hard	(Romania) Monica Niculescu	(Ukraine) Kateryna Bondarenko (Chinese Taipei) Chuang Chia-jung	7–5, 6–4
Win	40–17	Sep 2016	Pan Pacific Open, Japan (3)	Premier	Hard	(Czech Republic) Barbora Strýcová	(China) Liang Chen (China) Yang Zhaoxuan	6–1, 6–1
Loss	40–18	Oct 2016	Wuhan Open, China	Premier 5	Hard	(Czech Republic) Barbora Strýcová	(United States) Bethanie Mattek-Sands (Czech Republic) Lucie Šafářová	1–6, 4–6
Win	41–18	Jan 2017	Brisbane International, Australia (3)	Premier	Hard	(United States) Bethanie; Mattek-Sands	(Russia) Ekaterina Makarova (Russia) Elena Vesnina	6–2, 6–3
Loss	41–19	Jan 2017	Sydney International, Australia	Premier	Hard	(Czech Republic) Barbora Strýcová	(Hungary) Tímea Babos (Russia) Anastasia Pavlyuchenkova	4–6, 4–6
Loss	41–20	Apr 2017	Miami Open, US	Premier M	Hard	(Czech Republic) Barbora Strýcová	(Canada) Gabriela Dabrowski (China) Xu Yifan	4–6, 3–6
Win	42–20	Jan 2020	Hobart International, Australia	International	Hard	(Ukraine) Nadiia Kichenok	(China) Peng Shuai (China) Zhang Shuai	6–4, 6–4
Loss	42–21	Aug 2021	Tennis in Cleveland, US	WTA 250	Hard	(United States) Christina McHale	(Japan) Shuko Aoyama (Japan) Ena Shibahara	5–7, 3–6
Win	43–21	Sep 2021	Ostrava Open, Czech Republic	WTA 500	Hard (i)	(China) Zhang Shuai	(United States) Kaitlyn Christian (New Zealand) Erin Routliffe	6–3, 6–2
Loss	43–22	Apr 2022	Charleston Open, US	WTA 500	Clay (green)	(Czech Republic) Lucie Hradecká	(Slovenia) Andreja Klepač (Poland) Magda Linette	2–6, 6–4, [7–10]
Loss	43–23	May 2022	Internationaux de Strasbourg, France	WTA 250	Clay	(Czech Republic) Lucie Hradecká	(United States) Nicole Melichar-Martinez (Australia) Daria Saville	7–5, 5–7, [6–10]

== ITF Circuit finals ==
=== Singles: 19 (14–5) ===
Legend
$75,000 tournaments (1–1)
$50,000 tournaments (1–1)
$25,000 tournaments (2–2)
$10,000 tournaments (10–1)

Result	No.	Date	Tournament	Tier	Surface	Opponent	Score
Win	1.	22 September 2002	ITF Hyderabad, India		Hard	(Uzbekistan) Akgul Amanmuradova	6–1, 6–2
Win	2.	10 November 2002	ITF Manila, Philippines		Hard	(Chinese Taipei) Wang I-ting	2–6, 6–4, 7–5
Win	3.	17 November 2002	ITF Manila, Philippines		Hard	(Uzbekistan) Akgul Amanmuradova	6–0, 4–6, 6–3
Win	4.	23 February 2003	ITF Benin City, Nigeria		Hard	(Germany) Franziska Etzel	6–3, 6–3
Win	5.	2 March 2003	ITF Benin City, Nigeria		Hard	(South Africa) Anca Anastasiu	6–1, 7–5
Win	6.	5 October 2003	ITF Jakarta, Indonesia		Hard	(India) Rushmi Chakravarthi	6–3, 7–5
Win	7.	1 February 2004	ITF Boca Raton, United States		Hard	(United States) Cory Ann Avants	6–3, 6–2
Loss	1.	3 April 2004	ITF Rabat, Morocco		Clay	(Morocco) Bahia Mouhtassine	2–6, 5–7
Win	8.	30 May 2004	ITF Campobasso, Italy		Clay	(Romania) Magda Mihalache	6–3, 6–4
Win	9.	8 August 2004	ITF Wrexham, United Kingdom		Hard	(Russia) Irina Bulykina	1–6, 6–4, 6–1
Win	10.	15 August 2004	ITF Hampstead, UK		Hard	(Australia) Jaslyn Hewitt	4–6, 6–1, 6–0
Loss	2.	28 August 2004	ITF New Delhi, India		Hard	(Chinese Taipei) Chuang Chia-jung	5–7, 4–6
Win	11.	9 October 2004	Lagos Open, Nigeria		Hard	(United States) Tiffany Dabek	6–3, 5–7, 6–3
Win	12.	16 October 2004	Lagos Open, Nigeria		Hard	(South Africa) Chanelle Scheepers	4–6, 7–6^{(3)}, 7–5
Loss	3.	5 December 2004	ITF Palm Beach Gardens, US		Clay	(Bulgaria) Sesil Karatantcheva	6–3, 2–6, 5–7
Win	13.	26 July 2009	Lexington Challenger, US		Hard	(France) Julie Coin	7–6^{(5)}, 6–4
Loss	4.	9 August 2009	Vancouver Open, Canada		Hard	(Canada) Stéphanie Dubois	6–1, 4–6, 4–6
Loss	5.	25 July 2010	ITF Wrexham, UK		Hard	(United Kingdom) Heather Watson	2–6, 4–6
Win	14.	14 December 2010	Dubai Tennis Challenge, United Arab Emirates		Hard	(Serbia) Bojana Jovanovski	4–6, 6–3, 6–0

=== Doubles: 13 (4–9) ===
Legend
$100,000 tournaments (0–1)
$75,000 tournaments (0–1)
$25,000 tournaments (1–3)
$10,000 tournaments (3–4)

Result	No.	Date	Tournament	Tier	Surface	Partner	Opponents	Score
Loss	1.	29 April 2001	ITF Pune, India		Hard	(India) Sonal Phadke	(India) Rushmi Chakravarthi; (India) Sai Jayalakshmy Jayaram	2–6, 0–6
Win	1.	17 November 2002	ITF Manila, Philippines		Hard	(India) Radhika Tulpule	(China) Dong Yanhua; (China) Zhang Yao	6–4, 6–3
Loss	2.	8 December 2002	ITF Pune, India		Hard	(India) Radhika Tulpule	(Uzbekistan) Akgul Amanmuradova; (Ukraine) Kateryna Bondarenko	3–6, 6–7^{(1)}
Win	2.	2 March 2003	ITF Benin City, Nigeria		Hard	(United Kingdom) Rebecca Dandeniya	(Germany) Franziska Etzel; (Austria) Christina Obermoser	6–3, 6–0
Loss	3.	1 February 2004	ITF Boca Raton, US		Hard	(Belarus) Natallia Dziamidzenka	(United States) Allison Bradshaw; (United States) Julie Ditty	3–6, 1–6
Loss	4.	8 August 2004	ITF Wrexham, UK		Hard	(India) Rushmi Chakravarthi	(New Zealand) Eden Marama; (New Zealand) Paula Marama	6–7^{(4)}, 5–7
Win	3.	15 August 2004	ITF Hampstead, UK		Hard	(India) Rushmi Chakravarthi	(United Kingdom) Anna Hawkins; (South Africa) Nicole Rencken	6–3, 6–2
Loss	5.	28 August 2004	ITF New Delhi, India		Hard	(Uzbekistan) Akgul Amanmuradova	(Chinese Taipei) Chuang Chia-jung; (Chinese Taipei) Hsieh Su-wei	6–7^{(6)}, 4–6
Win	4.	9 October 2004	Lagos Open, Nigeria		Hard	(New Zealand) Shelley Stephens	(South Africa) Surina De Beer; (South Africa) Chanelle Scheepers	6–1, 6–4
Loss	6.	16 October 2004	Lagos Open, Nigeria		Hard	(New Zealand) Shelley Stephens	(South Africa) Surina De Beer; (South Africa) Chanelle Scheepers	0–6, 0–6
Loss	7.	24 July 2010	ITF Wrexham, UK		Hard	(Finland) Emma Laine	(United Kingdom) Tara Moore; (United Kingdom) Francesca Stephenson	6–2, 3–6, [11–13]
Loss	8.	7 November 2010	Taipei Open, Taiwan		Carpet (i)	(Chinese Taipei) Hsieh Su-wei	(Chinese Taipei) Chang Kai-chen (Chinese Taipei) Chuang Chia-jung	4–6, 2–6
Loss	9.	17 December 2010	Dubai Tennis Challenge, UAE		Hard	(Czech Republic) Vladimíra Uhlířová	(Germany) Julia Görges; (Croatia) Petra Martić	4–6, 6–7^{(7)}

== Junior finals ==
=== Grand Slam tournaments ===
==== Girls' doubles: 1 (title) ====
Result	Year	Championship	Surface	Partner	Opponents	Score
Win	2003	Wimbledon	Grass	(Russia) Alisa Kleybanova	(Czech Republic) Kateřina Böhmová (Netherlands) Michaëlla Krajicek	2–6, 6–3, 6–2

=== ITF Junior Circuit ===
==== Singles (10–4) ====
Legend
Grand Slam
Category G1
Category G2
Category G3
Category G4
Category G5

Outcome	No.	Date	Tournament	Tier	Surface	Opponent	Score
Loss	1.	18 November 1999	Islamabad, Pakistan		Clay	(Pakistan) Nida Waseem	1–6, 4–6
Loss	2.	23 January 2000	Colombo, Sri Lanka		Clay	(India) Nandita Chandrasekar	1–6, 4–6
Win	3.	30 September 2000	Mumbai, India		Hard	(India) Meghha Vakaria	7–5, 6–4
Win	4.	8 October 2000	Islamabad, Pakistan		Clay	(Pakistan) Bilqees Ajam	6–0, 6–0
Win	5.	3 February 2001	Chandigarh, India		Hard	(India) Meghha Vakaria	6–4, 6–4
Win	6.	10 February 2001	Kolkata, India		Clay	(India) Ridhina Parekh	6–1, 6–4
Win	7.	23 February 2001	Dhaka, Bangladesh		Hard	(Chinese Taipei) Chen Yi	7–5, 6–3
Loss	8.	3 August 2001	Cairo, Egypt		Clay	(Egypt) Amani Khalifa	6–3, 6–7^{(4)}, 3–6
Win	9.	27 September 2001	Giza, Egypt		Clay	(Sweden) Helena Norfeldt	3–6, 7–6^{(11)}, 6–2
Loss	10.	21 October 2001	Hong Kong		Hard	(Croatia) Matea Mezak	4–6, 7–6^{(3)}, 2–6
Win	11.	27 July 2002	Pretoria, South Africa		Hard	(India) Isha Lakhani	2–6, 6–3, 6–2
Win	12.	9 August 2002	Gaborone, Botswana		Hard	(South Africa) Tarryn Terblanche	6–0, 6–4
Win	13.	14 December 2002	New Delhi, India		Hard	(India) Ankita Bhambri	6–3, 7–5
Win	14.	6 April 2003	Manila, Philippines		Hard	(India) Tara Iyer	6–2, 7–5

==== Doubles (13–6) ====
Outcome	No.	Date	Tournament	Tier	Surface	Partner	Opponents	Score
Win	1.	18 November 1999	Islamabad, Pakistan		Clay	(Pakistan) Nida Waseem	(Pakistan) Suhair Khan; (Indonesia) Sanduni Wijeratne	6–0, 6–0
Win	2.	8 October 2000	Islamabad, Pakistan		Clay	(Pakistan) Zahra Omer Khan	(Pakistan) Bilqees Ajam; (Pakistan) Huma Ajam	6–0, 6–0
Win	3.	27 January 2001	New Delhi, India		Hard	(India) Sasha Abraham	(Thailand) Rattiya Hiranrat; (Thailand) Pichaya Laosirichon	6–1, 7–6^{(2)}
Win	4.	3 February 2001	Chandigarh, India		Clay	(India) Sasha Abraham	(Indonesia) Sandy Gumulya; (Indonesia) Septi Mende	6–1, 7–6^{(5)}
Loss	5.	10 February 2001	Kolkata, India		Clay	(Indonesia) Maya Rosa	(Indonesia) Sandy Gumulya; (Indonesia) Septi Mende	4–6, 6–1, 4–6
Win	6.	3 August 2001	Cairo, Egypt		Clay	(Federal Republic of Yugoslavia) Vana Mražović	(Egypt) Heidi El Tabakh; (Egypt) Amani Khalifa	6–2, 6–2
Win	7.	27 September 2001	Giza, Egypt		Clay	(India) Sasha Abraham	(Egypt) Heidi El Tabakh; (Egypt) Amani Khalifa	6–3, 6–3
Loss	8.	21 October 2001	Hong Kong		Hard	(Croatia) Matea Mezak	(Slovakia) Kristína Michalaková; (Czech Republic) Andrea Hlaváčková	3–6, 6–2, 1–6
Win	9.	9 January 2002	Traralgon, Australia		Hard	(Slovakia) Linda Smolenaková	(Russia) Nina Bratchikova; (Russia) Julia Efremova	4–6, 6–2, 6–4
Loss	10.	20 April 2002	Taipei, Taiwan		Hard	(Australia) Lara Giltinan	(Chinese Taipei) Kao Shao-yuan; (Chinese Taipei) Wang Ting-wen	4–6, 4–6
Win	11.	21 July 2002	Pretoria, South Africa		Hard	(India) Isha Lakhani	(South Africa) Roxanne Clarke; (South Africa) Tarryn Rudman	7–6^{(2)}, 6–2
Win	12.	27 July 2002	Pretoria, South Africa		Hard	(India) Isha Lakhani	(South Africa) Tamara Day; (South Africa) Tarryn Terblanche	6–3, 6–1
Loss	13.	4 August 2002	Cairo, Egypt		Clay	(Egypt) Amani Khalifa	(Chinese Taipei) Chen Yi; (Ukraine) Viktoria Lytovchenko	6–2, 4–6, 3–6
Win	14.	9 August 2002	Gaborone, Botswana		Hard	(South Africa) Tarryn Terblanche	(Namibia) Elna de Villiers; (Botswana) Tapiwa Marobela	6–0, 6–0
Loss	15.	14 December 2002	New Delhi, India		Hard	(India) Isha Lakhani	(South Korea) Kim Ji-young (South Korea) Kim So-jung	6–7^{(4)}, 6–7^{(7)}
Win	16.	13 April 2003	Nagoya, Japan		Carpet	(India) Sanaa Bhambri	(Japan) Shiho Tanaka; (Japan) Natsumi Tsubo	6–2, 7–5
Win	17.	14 June 2003	Frankfurt, Germany		Clay	(India) Sanaa Bhambri	(Germany) Maren Kassens; (Russia) Alla Kudryavtseva	6–1, 6–0
Win	18.	6 July 2003	Wimbledon, UK		Grass	(Russia) Alisa Kleybanova	(Czech Republic) Kateřina Böhmová; (Netherlands) Michaëlla Krajicek	2–6, 6–3, 6–2
Loss	19.	30 August 2003	Quebec, Canada		Hard	(Russia) Anna Chakvetadze	(Serbia and Montenegro) Ana Ivanovic; (Russia) Alla Kudryavtseva	1–6, 6–2, 3–6

== Fed Cup ==
2003 Asia/Oceania Group II
Date	Venue	Surface	Round	Opponents	Tie Score	Match	Opponent	Rubber score
21 – 23 Apr 2003	Tokyo	Hard	RR	Philippines	3–0	Singles	Francesca La'O	6–2, 6–3 (W)
21 – 23 Apr 2003	Tokyo	Hard	RR	Kyrgyzstan	3–0	Singles	Yulia Klimchenko	6–0, 6–0 (W)
21 – 23 Apr 2003	Tokyo	Hard	RR	Pacific Oceania	2–0	Singles	Gurianna Korinihona	6–2, 6–0 (W)
2004 Asia/Oceania Group I
19 – 24 Apr 2004	New Delhi	Hard	RR	Chinese Taipei	3–0	Singles	Chuang Chia-jung	6–4, 7–6^{(7–3)} (W)
19 – 24 Apr 2004	New Delhi	Hard	RR	Chinese Taipei	3–0	Doubles (with Manisha Malhotra)	Hwang/Wang	7–5, 6–1 (W)
19 – 24 Apr 2004	New Delhi	Hard	RR	South Korea	2–1	Singles	Jeon Mi-ra	4–6, 2–6 (L)
19 – 24 Apr 2004	New Delhi	Hard	RR	South Korea	2–1	Doubles (with Manisha Malhotra)	Cho/Jeon	7–6^{(7–2)}, 7–5 (W)
19 – 24 Apr 2004	New Delhi	Hard	RR	Indonesia	1–2	Singles	Wynne Prakusya	5–7, 4–6 (L)
19 – 24 Apr 2004	New Delhi	Hard	RR	Indonesia	1–2	Doubles (with Manisha Malhotra)	Prakusya/Widjaja	6–7^{(2–7)}, 3–6 (L)
19 – 24 Apr 2004	New Delhi	Hard	RR	Uzbekistan	2–1	Singles	Akgul Amanmuradova	6–2, 6–4 (W)
19 – 24 Apr 2004	New Delhi	Hard	RR	Uzbekistan	2–1	Doubles (with Manisha Malhotra)	Ekshibarova/Israilova	7–6^{(21–19)}, 6–1 (W)
19 – 24 Apr 2004	New Delhi	Hard	PO (Promotion)	Thailand	0–2	Singles	Suchanun Viratprasert	6–7^{(3–7)}, 1–6 (L)
2006 Asia/Oceania Group I
20 – 22 Apr 2006	Seoul	Hard	RR	Chinese Taipei	2–0	Singles	Hsieh Su-wei	6–4, 7–6^{(7–4)} (W)
20 – 22 Apr 2006	Seoul	Hard	RR	New Zealand	2–1	Singles	Ellen Barry	6–2, 6–4 (W)
20 – 22 Apr 2006	Seoul	Hard	PO (Promotion)	Australia	1–2	Singles	Samantha Stosur	4–6, 2–6 (L)
20 – 22 Apr 2006	Seoul	Hard	PO (Promotion)	Australia	1–2	Doubles (with Shikha Uberoi)	Stosur/Stubbs	6–7^{(4–7)}, 2–6 (L)
2008 Asia/Oceania Group I
30 Jan – 2 Feb 2008	Bangkok	Hard	PO (Relegation)	Hong Kong	2–1	Doubles (with Sunitha Rao)	Yang/Zhang	7–6^{(8–6)}, 6–2 (W)
2010 Asia/Oceania Group II
4 – 6 Feb 2010	Kuala Lumpur	Hard	RR	Singapore	3–0	Singles	Stefanie Tan	6–2, 6–3 (W)
4 – 6 Feb 2010	Kuala Lumpur	Hard	RR	Malaysia	3–0	Singles	Jawairiah Noordin	6–1, 6–0 (W)
4 – 6 Feb 2010	Kuala Lumpur	Hard	PO (Promotion)	Kyrgyzstan	3–0	Singles	Ksenia Ulukan	6–0, 6–2 (W)
2011 Asia/Oceania Group I
31 Jan – 6 Feb 2011	Nonthaburi	Hard	RR	Thailand	1–2	Singles	Noppawan Lertcheewakarn	6–2, 6–0 (W)
31 Jan – 6 Feb 2011	Nonthaburi	Hard	RR	Thailand	1–2	Doubles (with Rushmi Chakravarthi)	Lertcheewakarn/Wannasuk	6–3, 0–6, 5–7 (L)
31 Jan – 6 Feb 2011	Nonthaburi	Hard	RR	Uzbekistan	1–2	Singles	Nigina Abduraimova	6–4, 6–1 (W)
31 Jan – 6 Feb 2011	Nonthaburi	Hard	RR	Uzbekistan	1–2	Doubles (with Rushmi Chakravarthi)	Abduraimova/Khabibulina	6–2, 3–6, 3–6 (L)
31 Jan – 6 Feb 2011	Nonthaburi	Hard	RR	China	1–2	Singles	Lu Jingjing	1–6, 6–0, 4–6 (L)
2012 Asia/Oceania Group II
30 Jan – 4 Feb 2012	Shenzhen	Hard	RR	Philippines	2–1	Doubles (with Isha Lakhani)	Nguyen/Patrimonio	6–0, 6–1 (W)
30 Jan – 4 Feb 2012	Shenzhen	Hard	PO (Promotion)	Hong Kong	2–1	Singles	Zhang Ling	5–7, 6–0, 6–1 (W)
30 Jan – 4 Feb 2012	Shenzhen	Hard	PO (Promotion)	Hong Kong	2–1	Doubles (with Isha Lakhani)	Chan/Zhang	6–7^{(7–9)}, 6–1, 7–5 (W)
2014 Asia/Oceania Group II
4 – 6 Feb 2014	Astana	Hard(i)	RR	Iran	3–0	Doubles (with Ankita Raina)	Pakbaten/Sadeghvaziri	6–0, 6–1 (W)
4 – 6 Feb 2014	Astana	Hard(i)	RR	Pakistan	3–0	Doubles (with Prarthana Thombare)	Mansoor/Suhail	6–2, 6–1 (W)
4 – 6 Feb 2014	Astana	Hard(i)	RR	New Zealand	2–1	Doubles (with Prarthana Thombare)	Erakovic/Guthrie	7–5, 6–1 (W)
2015 Asia/Oceania Group II
14 – 18 Apr 2015	Hyderabad	Hard	PO (Promotion)	Philippines	2–1	Doubles (with Prarthana Thombare)	Lehnert/Patrimonio	6–3, 6–3 (W)
2016 Asia/Oceania Group I
03 – 6 Feb 2016	Hua Hin	Hard	RR	Japan	1–2	Doubles (with Prarthana Thombare)	Aoyama/Hozumi	6–7, 3–6 (L)
03 – 6 Feb 2016	Hua Hin	Hard	RR	Uzbekistan	3–0	Doubles (with Ankita Raina)	Amanmuradova/Folts	6–2, 6–0 (W)

== Other finals ==
=== Singles ===
Medal	Date	Tournament	Location	Opponent	Score
Gold	October 2003	2003 Afro-Asian Games	Hyderabad, India	(India) Rushmi Chakravarthi	7–6 ^{(8–6)}, 6–3
Silver	December 2006	2006 Asian Games	Doha, Qatar	(China) Zheng Jie	4–6, 6–1, 1–6
Silver	October 2010	2010 Commonwealth Games	Delhi, India	(Australia) Anastasia Rodionova	3–6, 6–2, 6–7 ^{(3–7)}
Bronze	November 2010	2010 Asian Games	Guangzhou, China	(Uzbekistan) Akgul Amanmuradova	7–6^{(9–7)}, 3–6, 4–6

=== Doubles ===
Outcome	Date	Tournament	Location	Partner	Opponents	Score
Gold	October 2003	2003 Afro-Asian Games	Hyderabad, India	(India) Rushmi Chakravarthi	(Indonesia) Septi Mende; (Indonesia) Maya Rosa Ariana Stefanie	7–6^{(7–2)}, 6–3
Bronze	October 2010	2010 Commonwealth Games	Delhi, India	(India) Rushmi Chakravarthi	(India) Poojashree Venkatesha (India) Nirupama Sanjeev	6–4, 6–2
Bronze	September 2014	2014 Asian Games	Incheon, South Korea	(India) Prarthana Thombare	(Chinese Taipei) Chan Chin-wei (Chinese Taipei) Hsieh Su-wei	6–7, 6–2, [4–10]

=== Mixed doubles ===
Outcome	Date	Tournament	Location	Partner	Opponents	Score
Bronze	November 2002	2002 Asian Games	Busan, South Korea	(India) Leander Paes	(Chinese Taipei) Janet Lee (Chinese Taipei) Lu Yen-hsun	6–7^{(4–7)}, 5–7
Gold	October 2003	2003 Afro-Asian Games	Hyderabad, India	(India) Mahesh Bhupathi	(India) Rushmi Chakravarthi (India) Vishal Uppal	7–6^{(7–1)}, 6–3
Gold	December 2006	2006 Asian Games	Doha, Qatar	(India) Leander Paes	(Japan) Akiko Morigami (Japan) Satoshi Iwabuchi	7–5, 5–7, 6–2
Silver	November 2010	2010 Asian Games	Guangzhou, China	(India) Vishnu Vardhan	(Chinese Taipei) Chan Yung-jan (Chinese Taipei) Yang Tsung-hua	6–4, 1–6, [2–10]
Gold	September 2014	2014 Asian Games	Incheon, South Korea	(India) Saketh Myneni	(Chinese Taipei) Peng Hsien-yin (Chinese Taipei) Chan Hao-ching	6–4, 6–3

== WTA ranking ==
=== Doubles ===
Year	2002	2003	2004	2005	2006	2007	2008	2009	2010	2011	2012	2013	2014	2015	2016	2017	...	2020	2021	2022	2023
High	591	320	166	109	24	18	18	36	33	10	7	9	5	1	1	1		222	60	22	24
Low	964	590	204	274	111	42	62	87	93	66	20	19	11	6	1	12		265	254	68	28
Year end	955	346	178	111	24	18	61	37	61	11	12	9	6	1	1	12		237	62	24	—

== Grand Slam seedings ==
The tournaments won by Sania are in boldface, and advances into finals by Sania are in italics.

=== Women's doubles ===
Not seeded at all, or not seeded inside the top 10 Seeded 10–4 Seeded no. 3 Seeded no. 2 Seeded no. 1

Legend seeded No. 1 (**3** / 5) seeded No. 2 (0 / 1) seeded No. 3 (0 / 1) seeded No. 4–10 (0 / 21) seeded No. 11–16 (0 / 12) unseeded (0 / 13)	Longest streak 5 1 1 7 3 6

Year	Australian Open	French Open	Wimbledon	US Open
2004	did not play	did not play	did not qualify	did not play
2005	did not play	not seeded	not seeded	not seeded
2006	not seeded	not seeded	not seeded	11th
2007	10th	not seeded	16th	16th
2008	6th	did not play	13th	did not play
2009	not seeded	14th	15th	14th
2010	10th	did not play	not seeded	not seeded
2011	not seeded	6th (1)	4th	6th
2012	6th	15th	13th	13th
2013	10th	6th	7th	10th
2014	6th	5th	4th	3rd
2015	2nd	1st	**1st (1)**	**1st (2)**
2016	**1st (3)**	1st	1st	7th
2017	4th	4th	13th	4th
2018-2019	did not play			
2020	protected ranking	did not play	tournament cancelled*	did not play
2021	did not play	did not play	protected ranking	wild card
2022	12th	10th	6th	did not play
2023	8th	did not play		

* Due to the COVID-19 pandemic, the 2020 Wimbledon Championships of the tournament was cancelled.

=== Mixed doubles ===
Not seeded at all, or not seeded inside the top 10 Seeded 10–4 Seeded no. 3 Seeded no. 2 Seeded no. 1

Legend seeded No. 1 (**1** / 8) seeded No. 2 (0 / 6) seeded No. 3 (0 / 1) seeded No. 4–10 (**1** / 9) seeded No. 11–16 (0 / 2) unseeded (**1** / 23)	Longest streak 3 2 1 5 1 9

Year	Australian Open	French Open	Wimbledon	US Open
2005	did not play	did not play	not seeded	did not play
2006	not seeded	not seeded	not seeded	not seeded
2007	not seeded	not seeded	not seeded	not seeded
2008	not seeded (1)	did not play	11th	did not play
2009	**wild card (1)**	not seeded	13th	not seeded
2010	did not play			
2011	did not play	not seeded	6th	6th
2012	6th	**7th (2)**	5th	not seeded
2013	3rd	1st	2nd	not seeded
2014	6th (2)	not seeded	6th	**1st (3)**
2015	1st	1st	2nd	1st
2016	1st	2nd (3)	1st	1st
2017	2nd (4)	2nd	4th	2nd
2018-2020	did not play			
2021	did not play	did not play	protected ranking	wild card
2022	not seeded	not seeded	6th	did not play
2023	not seeded (5)	did not play		

== Career earnings ==
Year	Earnings (US$)	Money list rank
2001–2002	7,750	—N/a
2003	8,660	405
2004	30,030	233
2005	254,415	51
2006	261,471	48
2007	395,597	41
2008	243,013	69
2009	360,529	59
2010	148,844	—N/a
2011	548,834	39
2012	452,664	44
2013	468,113	42
2014	798,175	33
2015	1,566,203	19
2016	897,479	35
2017	488,568	75
2018	did not play	
2019	did not play	
2020	21,615	332
2021	71,912	285
2022	217,262	177
2023	24,112	466
Career	7,265,246	95

== SanTina streaks ==
=== 14-match win streak 2015 ===
Sania Mirza and Martina Hingis joined forces during March 2015. They saw immediate success winning first three tournaments together. Following her victory at Charleston Open, Mirza claimed the world No 1 spot.

No.	Tournament	Start date (tournament)	Surface	Opponent	Rank	Rd	Score
1	Indian Wells Masters, U.S.	11 March 2015	Hard	(Czech Republic) Karolína Plíšková / (Slovakia) Magdaléna Rybáriková	111	1R	6–2, 6–1
2	Indian Wells Masters, U.S.	11 March 2015	Hard	(Russia) Alla Kudryavtseva / (Russia) Anastasia Pavlyuchenkova(1)	56	2R	6–3, 6–2
3	Indian Wells Masters, U.S.	11 March 2015	Hard	(Slovakia) Daniela Hantuchová / (Italy) Karin Knapp	200	QF	6–4, 6–2
4	Indian Wells Masters, U.S.	11 March 2015	Hard	(United States) Lisa Raymond / (Australia) Samantha Stosur	128	SF	6–0, 6–4
5	Indian Wells Masters, U.S.	11 March 2015	Hard	(Russia) Ekaterina Makarova / (Russia) Elena Vesnina(1)	16	F	6–3, 6–4
6	Miami Open, U.S.	24 March 2015	Hard	(Romania) Elena Bogdan / (United States) Nicole Melichar	200	1R	6–1, 6–0
7	Miami Open, U.S.	24 March 2015	Hard	(Canada) Gabriela Dabrowski / (Poland) Alicja Rosolska	102	2R	7–6^{(8–6)}, 6–4
8	Miami Open, U.S.	24 March 2015	Hard	(Australia) Anastasia Rodionova / (Australia) Arina Rodionova(1)	76	QF	6–3, 6–4
9	Miami Open, U.S.	24 March 2015	Hard	(Hungary) Tímea Babos / (France) Kristina Mladenovic	32	SF	6–2, 6–4
10	Miami Open, U.S.	24 March 2015	Hard	(Russia) Ekaterina Makarova / (Russia) Elena Vesnina(2)	14	F	7–5, 6–1
11	Family Circle Cup, U.S.	6 April 2015	Clay (green)	(Australia) Anastasia Rodionova / (Australia) Arina Rodionova(2)	68	1R	6–7^{(7–9)}, 6–3, [10–5]
12	Family Circle Cup, U.S.	6 April 2015	Clay (green)	(Spain) Anabel Medina Garrigues / (Kazakhstan) Yaroslava Shvedova	75	QF	7–5, 4–6, [13–11]
13	Family Circle Cup, U.S.	6 April 2015	Clay (green)	(Russia) Alla Kudryavtseva / (Russia) Anastasia Pavlyuchenkova(2)	52	SF	6–4, 1–6, [10–7]
14	Family Circle Cup, U.S.	6 April 2015	Clay (green)	(Australia) Casey Dellacqua / (Croatia) Darija Jurak	98	F	6–0, 6–4
–	Stuttgart Open, Germany	20 April 2015	Clay	(Croatia) Petra Martić / (Liechtenstein) Stephanie Vogt	261	1R	3–6, 3–6

=== 41-match win streak 2015–2016 ===
Sania Mirza and Martina Hingis were chasing the longest winning streak since 1990 at 44 match wins set by Jana Novotná and Helena Suková but fell 3 matches short.

No.	Tournament	Start date (tournament)	Surface	Opponent	Rank	Rd	Score
–	Cincinnati Masters, U.S.	17 August 2015	Hard	(Chinese Taipei) Chan Hao-ching / (Chinese Taipei) Chan Yung-jan	56	SF	4–6, 6–0, [6–10]
1	US Open	31 August 2015	Hard	(United States) Kaitlyn Christian / (United States) Sabrina Santamaria	1648	1R	6–1, 6–2
2	US Open	31 August 2015	Hard	(Switzerland) Timea Bacsinszky / (Chinese Taipei) Chuang Chia-jung	154	2R	6–1, 6–1
3	US Open	31 August 2015	Hard	(Netherlands) Michaëlla Krajicek / (Czech Republic) Barbora Strýcová	53	3R	6–3, 6–0
4	US Open	31 August 2015	Hard	(Chinese Taipei) Chan Hao-ching / (Chinese Taipei) Chan Yung-jan(1)	42	QF	7–6^{(7–5)}, 6–1
5	US Open	31 August 2015	Hard	(Italy) Sara Errani / (Italy) Flavia Pennetta(1)	46	SF	6–4, 6–1
6	US Open	31 August 2015	Hard	(Australia) Casey Dellacqua / (Kazakhstan) Yaroslava Shvedova	25	F	6–3, 6–3
7	Guangzhou Open, china	21 September 2015	Hard	(Germany) Anna-Lena Friedsam / (Romania) Monica Niculescu	647	QF	6–2, 6–3
8	Guangzhou Open, china	21 September 2015	Hard	(Israel) Julia Glushko / (Sweden) Rebecca Peterson	392	SF	6–3, 6–4
9	Guangzhou Open, china	21 September 2015	Hard	(China) Xu Shilin / (China) You Xiaodi	1358	F	6–3, 6–1
10	Wuhan Open, China	27 September 2015	Hard	(Poland) Klaudia Jans-Ignacik / (Australia) Anastasia Rodionova	70	2R	6–3, 6–2
11	Wuhan Open, China	27 September 2015	Hard	(United States) Raquel Atawo / (United States) Abigail Spears(1)	31	QF	6–2, 6–2
12	Wuhan Open, China	27 September 2015	Hard	(Chinese Taipei) Chan Hao-ching / (Chinese Taipei) Chan Yung-jan(2)	28	SF	6–2, 6–1
13	Wuhan Open, China	27 September 2015	Hard	(Romania) Irina-Camelia Begu / (Romania) Monica Niculescu	110	F	6–2, 6–3
14	China Open	3 October 2015	Hard	(Italy) Sara Errani / (Italy) Flavia Pennetta(2)	56	2R	1–6, 6–4, [10–6]
15	China Open	3 October 2015	Hard	(Germany) Julia Görges / (Czech Republic) Karolína Plíšková(1)	83	QF	7–6^{(7–5)}, 6–4
16	China Open	3 October 2015	Hard	(China) Liang Chen / (China) Wang Yafan	129	SF	6–2, 6–3
17	China Open	3 October 2015	Hard	(Chinese Taipei) Chan Hao-ching / (Chinese Taipei) Chan Yung-jan(3)	24	F	6–7^{(9–11)}, 6–1, [10–8]
18	WTA Finals, Singapore	25 October 2015	Hard (i)	(Hungary) Tímea Babos / (France) Kristina Mladenovic	20	RR	6–4, 7–5
19	WTA Finals, Singapore	25 October 2015	Hard (i)	(United States) Raquel Atawo / (United States) Abigail Spears(2)	33	RR	6–4, 6–2
20	WTA Finals, Singapore	25 October 2015	Hard (i)	(Czech Republic) Andrea Hlaváčková / (Czech Republic) Lucie Hradecká(1)	33	RR	6–3, 6–4
21	WTA Finals, Singapore	25 October 2015	Hard (i)	(Chinese Taipei) Chan Hao-ching / (Chinese Taipei) Chan Yung-jan(4)	20	SF	6–4, 6–2
22	WTA Finals, Singapore	25 October 2015	Hard (i)	(Spain) Garbiñe Muguruza / (Spain) Carla Suárez Navarro	39	F	6–0, 6–3
23	Brisbane International, Australia	3 January 2016	Hard	(Israel) Shahar Pe'er / (United States) Maria Sanchez	231	R1	6–1, 6–2
24	Brisbane International, Australia	3 January 2016	Hard	(Switzerland) Belinda Bencic / (France) Kristina Mladenovic	82	QF	6–3, 4–6, [10–6]
25	Brisbane International, Australia	3 January 2016	Hard	(Slovenia) Andreja Klepač / (Russia) Alla Kudryavtseva	54	SF	6–3, 7–5
26	Brisbane International, Australia	3 January 2016	Hard	(Germany) Angelique Kerber / (Germany) Andrea Petkovic	569	F	7–5, 6–1
27	Sydney International, Australia	10 January 2016	Hard	(Australia) Anastasia Rodionova / (Australia) Arina Rodionova	103	R1	6–2, 6–3
28	Sydney International, Australia	10 January 2016	Hard	(China) Liang Chen / (China) Peng Shuai	533	QF	6–2, 6–3
29	Sydney International, Australia	10 January 2016	Hard	(Romania) Raluca Olaru / (Kazakhstan) Yaroslava Shvedova	60	SF	4–6, 6–3, [10–8]
30	Sydney International, Australia	10 January 2016	Hard	(France) Caroline Garcia / (France) Kristina Mladenovic	24	F	1–6, 7–5, [10–5]
31	Australian Open	18 January 2016	Hard	(Colombia) Mariana Duque Mariño / (Brazil) Teliana Pereira	533	1R	6–2, 6–3
32	Australian Open	18 January 2016	Hard	(Ukraine) Lyudmyla Kichenok / (Ukraine) Nadiia Kichenok	123	2R	6–2, 6–3
33	Australian Open	18 January 2016	Hard	(Russia) Svetlana Kuznetsova / (Italy) Roberta Vinci	208	3R	6–1, 6–3
34	Australian Open	18 January 2016	Hard	(Germany) Anna-Lena Grönefeld / (United States) CoCo Vandeweghe	73	QF	6–2, 4–6, 6–1
35	Australian Open	18 January 2016	Hard	(Germany) Julia Görges / (Czech Republic) Karolína Plíšková(2)	82	SF	6–1, 6–0
36	Australian Open	18 January 2016	Hard	(Czech Republic) Andrea Hlaváčková / (Czech Republic) Lucie Hradecká(2)	37	F	7–6^{(7–1)}, 6–3
37	St. Petersburg Trophy, Russia	8 February 2016	Hard (i)	(Latvia) Jeļena Ostapenko / (Russia) Evgeniya Rodina	323	1R	7–5, 7–5
38	St. Petersburg Trophy, Russia	8 February 2016	Hard (i)	(Russia) Daria Kasatkina / (Russia) Elena Vesnina	111	QF	6–4, 6–1
39	St. Petersburg Trophy, Russia	8 February 2016	Hard (i)	(Spain) Anabel Medina Garrigues / (Spain) Arantxa Parra Santonja	59	SF	7–5, 6–7^{(6–8)}, [10–6]
40	St. Petersburg Trophy, Russia	8 February 2016	Hard (i)	(Russia) Vera Dushevina / (Czech Republic) Barbora Krejčíková	146	F	6–3, 6–1
41	Qatar Open	21 February 2016	Hard	(China) Xu Yifan / (China) Zheng Saisai	46	2R	6–4, 4–6, [10–4]
–	Qatar Open	21 February 2016	Hard	(Russia) Daria Kasatkina / (Russia) Elena Vesnina	102	QF	6–2, 4–6, [5–10]

== Top 10 wins ==
Mirza has a 3–22 record against players who were, at the time the match was played, ranked in the top 10.

Season	2005	2006	Total
Wins	2	1	3

#	Opponent	Rk	Event	Surface	Rd	Score	Rk	Ref
2005
1.	(Russia) Svetlana Kuznetsova	No. 7	Dubai Tennis Championships, UAE	Hard	2R	6–4, 6–2	No. 97	
2.	(Russia) Nadia Petrova	No. 9	San Diego Open, US	Hard	1R	6–2, 6–1	No. 59	
2006
3.	(Switzerland) Martina Hingis	No. 8	Korea Open, South Korea	Hard	2R	4–6, 6–0, 6–4	No. 59	

- Key: (Rk) first use, opponent rank; (Rd) round; (Rk) 2nd use, player rank; (Ref) reference; (F) final; (SF) semifinal; (QF) quarterfinal; (#R) rounds 4, 3, 2, 1; (RR) round-robin stage

== Doubles head-to-head ==
Opponent		(India) Sania Mirza (partnered with)			
Team	Best Results	(United States) Bethanie Mattek-Sands	(Russia) Elena Vesnina	(Zimbabwe) Cara Black	(Switzerland) Martina Hingis
(United States) Liezel Huber; (United States) Lisa Raymond	1 Grand Slam Title (2011 US Open)	0 – 1	3 – 2	1 – 0	–
(Argentina) Gisela Dulko; (Italy) Flavia Pennetta	1 Grand Slam Title (2011 Oz Open)	–	1 – 0	–	–
(Italy) Sara Errani; (Italy) Roberta Vinci	5 Grand Slam Titles (2013 2014 Oz Open, 2012 RG, 2014 SW19, 2012 US Open)	0 – 3	0 – 1	1 – 4	–
(Czech Republic) Květa Peschke; (Slovenia) Katarina Srebotnik	1 Grand Slam Title (2011 SW19)	–	0 – 2	2 – 0	–
(United States) Serena Williams; (United States) Venus Williams	14 Grand Slam Titles (2001 2003 2009 2010 Oz Open, 1999 2010 RG, 2000 2002 2008 2009 2012 2016 SW19, 1999 2009 US Open)	0 – 2	–	–	–
(Australia) Casey Dellacqua; (Kazakhstan) Yaroslava Shvedova	2 Grand Slam Finals (2015 RG, 2015 US Open)	–	–	–	2 – 0
(Czech Republic) Andrea Hlaváčková; (Czech Republic) Lucie Hradecká	2 Grand Slam Titles (2011 RG, 2013 US Open)	–	2 – 1	–	3 – 0
(Chinese Taipei) Hsieh Su-wei; (China) Peng Shuai	2 Grand Slam Titles (2013 SW19, 2014 RG)	–	1 – 0	3 – 3	3 – 0
(United States) Raquel Atawo; (United States) Abigail Spears	2 PM / P5 Titles (2012 Tokyo, 2014 Cincinnati)	1 – 0	–	3 – 1	3 – 0
(Russia) Ekaterina Makarova; (Russia) Elena Vesnina	2 Grand Slam Titles (2013 RG, 2014 US Open)	1 – 0	–	1 – 0	4 – 1
(Spain) Garbiñe Muguruza; (Spain) Carla Suárez Navarro	1 WTA Finals Runners-up (2015 WTA Finals)	–	–	2 – 0	1 – 0
(Chinese Taipei) Chan Hao-ching; (Chinese Taipei) Chan Yung-jan	2 PM / P5 Titles (2015 Cincinnati, 2016 Doha)	0 – 1	–	2 – 1	6 – 1
(United States) Bethanie Mattek-Sands; (Czech Republic) Lucie Šafářová	3 Grand Slam Titles (2015 Oz Open, 2015 RG, 2016 US Open)	–	–	–	0 – 2
(France) Caroline Garcia; (France) Kristina Mladenovic	2 Grand Slam Titl2 (2016 RG (2022 RG))	–	–	–	1 – 2

== Partnerships ==
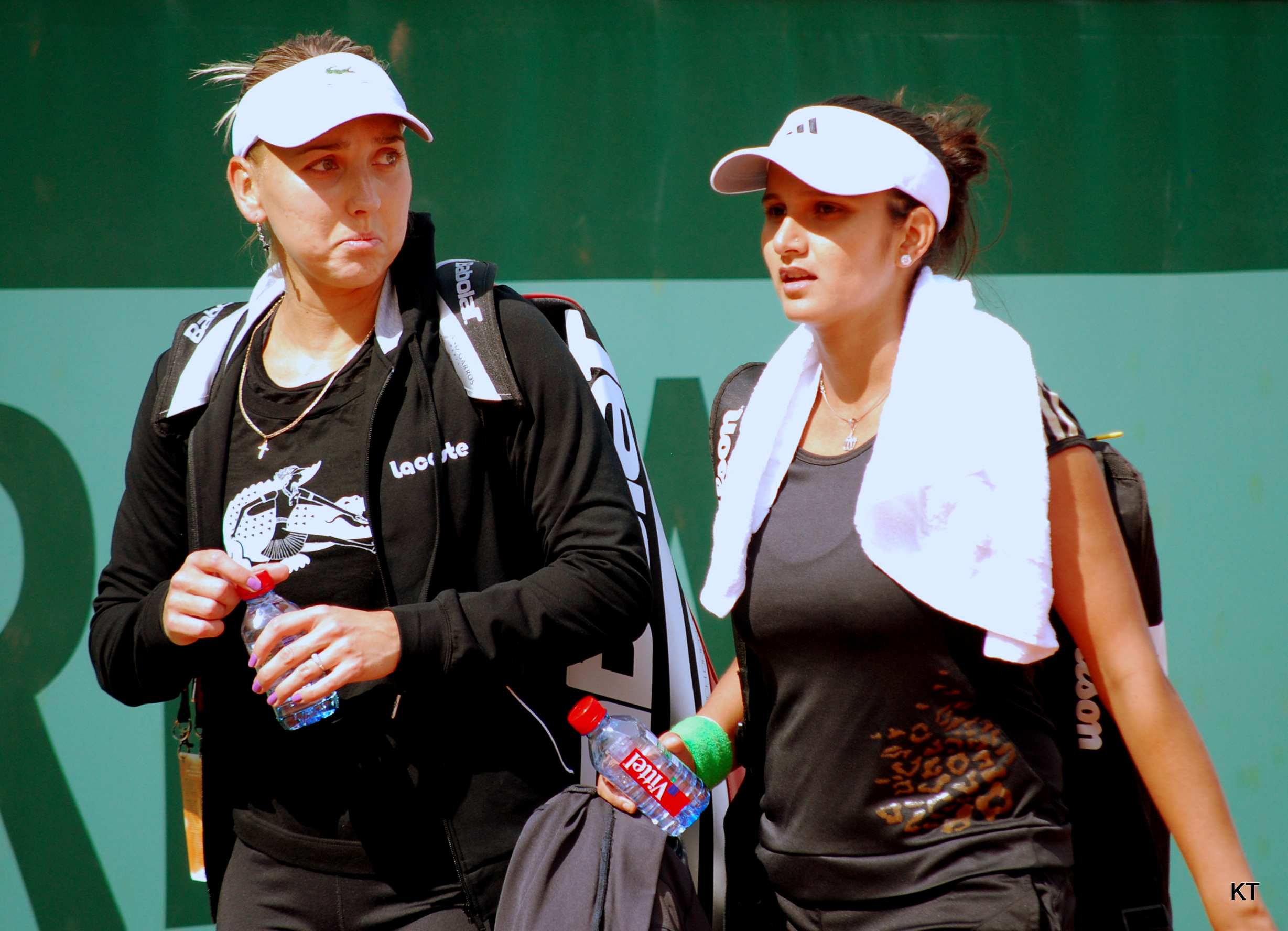
Mirza and Elena Vesnina were one of the most victorious doubles team in 2011, by winning two Premier Level titles, reaching the French Open Finals, the Wimbledon Semis.

Sania Mirza had changed lot of partnerships before stopping singles play but once becoming a doubles specialist she became cautious and kept long partnerships in both Women's and Mixed doubles. Martina Hingis is the 70th women's doubles partner of Sania's career. Sania has also teamed with 14 players in Grandslam Mixed Doubles.

=== Partners in Women's doubles ===
No.	Partner	Year
1	(India) Sonal Phadke	2001
2	(India) Ankita Bhambri	2002
3	(India) **Radhika Tulpule**	2002
4	(France) Mary Pierce	2003
5	(Hungary) Zsuzsanna Babos	2003
6	(United Kingdom) **Rebecca Dandeniya**	2003
7	(Uzbekistan) / (United States) Varvara Lepchenko	2003
8	(India) **Rushmi Chakravarthi**	2003 2004 2011 2012
9	(Thailand) Suchanun Viratprasert	2003
10	(Belarus) Natallia Dziamidzenka	2004
11	(South Africa) / (United States) **Liezel Huber**	2004 2006 2013
12	(Slovakia) Katarína Kachlíková	2004 2005
13	(India) Manisha Malhotra	2004
14	(Uzbekistan) Akgul Amanmuradova	2004
15	(New Zealand) **Shelley Stephens**	2004
16	(Spain) Nuria Llagostera Vives	2004 2012
17	(Slovenia) Petra Rampre	2004
18	(United States) / (India) Shikha Uberoi	2005 2006
19	(Russia) Anna Chakvetadze	2005 2008
20	(Ukraine) Yuliana Fedak	2005
21	(Australia) Bryanne Stewart	2005
22	(Poland) Marta Domachowska	2005 2006
23	(Spain) Virginia Ruano Pascual	2005 2010
24	(Israel) **Shahar Pe'er**	2005 2007
25	(United States) Corina Morariu	2006
26	(Venezuela) María Vento-Kabchi	2006
27	(Japan) Ai Sugiyama	2006
28	(Serbia) Ana Ivanovic	2006
29	(Australia) Alicia Molik	2006 2007 2008
30	(Slovakia) Janette Husárová	2006
31	(Italy) Francesca Schiavone	2006 2008 2009
32	(Netherlands) Michaëlla Krajicek	2006
33	(United States) **Bethanie Mattek-Sands**	2006 2007 2008 2012 2013 2015 2017 2021
34	(Spain) Anabel Medina Garrigues	2007 2012
35	(Italy) **Mara Santangelo**	2007 2009
36	(United States) **Vania King**	2007 2009
37	(Chinese Taipei) Chan Yung-jan	2007
38	(Czech Republic) Eva Birnerová	2007
39	(United States) Christina Fusano	2007
40	(Switzerland) Patty Schnyder	2007
41	(France) Nathalie Dechy	2008
42	(India) / (United States) Sunitha Rao	2008
43	(Chinese Taipei) **Chuang Chia-jung**	2009
44	(Romania) Sorana Cîrstea	2009
45	(Denmark) Caroline Wozniacki	2010
46	(United Kingdom) Laura Robson	2010
47	(Finland) Emma Laine	2010
48	(Canada) Stéphanie Dubois	2010
49	(Romania) **Monica Niculescu**	2010 2016
50	(Russia) Vera Dushevina	2010
51	(Romania) **Edina Gallovits-Hall**	2010
52	(Italy) Maria Elena Camerin	2010
53	(United States) Raquel Kops-Jones	2010
54	(Chinese Taipei) Hsieh Su-wei	2010 2015
55	(Czech Republic) Vladimíra Uhlířová	2010
56	(Czech Republic) Renata Voráčová	2011
57	(Chinese Taipei) Chang Kai-chen	2011
58	(Russia) **Elena Vesnina**	2011 2012
59	(Czech Republic) Lucie Hradecká	2011
60	(Kazakhstan) **Yaroslava Shvedova**	2011 2012 2017
61	(Italy) Roberta Vinci	2012
62	(India) Isha Lakhani	2012
63	(Australia) **Anastasia Rodionova**	2012
64	(Argentina) Paola Suárez	2012
65	(China) **Zheng Jie**	2013
66	(Italy) Flavia Pennetta	2013
67	(Zimbabwe) **Cara Black**	2013 2014
68	(India) Ankita Raina	2014 2016 2021 (Olympics)
69	(India) Prarthana Thombare	2014 2015 2016
70	(Switzerland) **Martina Hingis**	2015 2016
71	(Australia) Casey Dellacqua	2015
72	(United States) CoCo Vandeweghe	2016
73	(Czech Republic) **Barbora Strýcová**	2016 2017
74	(Czech Republic) Andrea Hlaváčková	2017
75	(Belgium) Kirsten Flipkens	2017
76	(China) Peng Shuai	2017
77	(Ukraine) **Nadiia Kichenok**	2020
78	(France) Caroline Garcia	2020
79	(Slovenia) Andreja Klepač	2021
80	(Turkey) Ons Jabeur	2021
81	(United States) Christina McHale	2021
82	(China) **Zhang Shuai**	2021

=== Records with Title Partners in Women's doubles ===
No.	Partner	Tournaments	First Tournament	Finals	First Final	Titles	Runners Up	Overall win–loss	Win Percentage
1.	(South Africa) / (United States) Liezel Huber	11	2004 Hyderabad Open	4	2004 Hyderabad Open	**3**	1	24–8	75%
2.	(Australia) Alicia Molik	3	2006 İstanbul Cup	1	2006 İstanbul Cup	0	1	5–3	62.5%
3.	(Poland) Marta Domachowska	3	2005 Commonwealth Bank Tennis Classic	1	2006 Cincinnati Open	0	1	3–3	50%
4.	(United States) Vania King	3	2007 Morocco Open	1	2007 Morocco Open	**1**	0	5–2	71.4%
5.	(Chinese Taipei) Chan Yung-jan	1	2007 İstanbul Cup	1	2007 İstanbul Cup	0	1	3–1	75%
6.	(United States) Bethanie Mattek-Sands	28	2006 Stanford Open	7	2007 Cincinnati Open	**6**	1	55–22	71.4%
7.	(Israel) Shahar Pe'er	5	2005 Pan Pacific Open	1	2007 Stanford Open	**1**	0	10–4	71.4%
8.	(Italy) Mara Santangelo	4	2007 Bangalore Open	1	2007 Connecticut Open	**1**	0	7–3	70%
9.	(Chinese Taipei) Chuang Chia-jung	8	2009 BNP Paribas Open	1	2009 Ponte Vedra Beach Open	**1**	0	14–7	66.7%
10.	(Romania) / (United States) Edina Gallovits	1	2010 Guangzhou Open	1	2010 Guangzhou Open	**1**	0	4–0	100%
11.	(Russia) Elena Vesnina	19	2011 Dubai Open	5	2011 BNP Paribas Open	**2**	3	40–17	70.2%
12.	(Kazakhstan) Yaroslava Shvedova	3	2011 Citi Open	1	2011 Citi Open	**1**	0	5–2	71%
13.	(Russia) / (Australia) Anastasia Rodionova	2	2012 Pattaya Open	1	2012 Pattaya Open	**1**	0	6–2	75%
14.	(Spain) Nuria Llagostera Vives	3	2012 Pan Pacific Open	1	2012 China Open	0	1	5–3	62.5%
15.	(China) Zheng Jie	5	2013 Brussels Open	1	2013 Connecticut Open	**1**	0	11–4	73.3%
16.	(Zimbabwe) Cara Black	24	2013 Pan Pacific Open	9	2013 Pan Pacific Open	**5**	4	56–19	75%
17.	(Chinese Taipei) Hsieh Su-wei	4	2015 Brisbane International	1	2015 Qatar Open	0	1	6–4	60%
18.	(Switzerland) Martina Hingis	31	2015 BNP Paribas Open	17	2015 BNP Paribas Open	**14**	3	92–17	84.4%
19.	(Czech Republic) Barbora Strýcová	11	2016 Cincinnati Open	5	2016 Cincinnati Open	**2**	3	30–9	76.9%
20.	(Romania) Monica Niculescu	2	2010 Cincinnati Open	1	2016 Connecticut Open	**1**	0	6–1	85.7%
21.	(Ukraine) Nadiia Kichenok	1	2020 Hobart International	1	2020 Hobart International	**1**	0	4–0	100%
22.	(United States) Christina McHale	1	2021 Tennis in the Land	1	2021 Tennis in the Land	0	1	3–1	75%
23.	(China) Zhang Shuai	2	2021 BGL Luxembourg Open	1	2021 J&T Banka Ostrava Open	**1**	0	5–1	83.3%

=== Partners in Mixed doubles ===
No.	Partner	Year
1	(Sweden) Simon Aspelin	2005
2	(Australia) Stephen Huss	2006
3	(Australia) Paul Hanley	2006
4	(Czech Republic) Pavel Vízner	2006
5	(India) Rohan Bopanna	2007 2011 2016 (Olympics) 2020 2021
6	(France) Fabrice Santoro	2007
7	(India) **Mahesh Bhupathi**	2007 2008 2009 2011 2012
7	(Canada) Daniel Nestor	2009
9	(India) Leander Paes	2012 (Olympics)
10	(United Kingdom) Colin Fleming	2012
11	(United States) Bob Bryan	2013
12	(Sweden) Robert Lindstedt	2013
13	(Romania) Horia Tecău	2013 2014
14	(Brazil) **Bruno Soares**	2014 2015
15	(Croatia) Ivan Dodig	2016 2017
16	(United States) Rajeev Ram	2021

- These lists only consists of players who played with Sania Mirza in WTA(& ITF) recognized tournaments which include the Olympics, Grand Slams, WTA Year-end championship, Premier tournaments, Fed Cup Ties, and WTA Challengers. They do not include the players who played with her in the other unrecognised multi-sport events and leagues such as IPTL. ITF Junior partners are also not included. The order of the players in the list is based on their first partnering with Sania Mirza. Leander Paes had also earlier played with Sania Mirza in 2006, 2010 in Asian Games and Commonwealth Games.
- Sania has won one or more title(s) with players whose names are in bold and the current partners names are in italic.

=== Other partners ===
==== India – Asian Games/Commonwealth Games/Other events ====
- (India) Mahesh Bhupathi
- (India) Leander Paes
- (India) Vishnu Vardhan
- (India) Shikha Uberoi
- (India) Rushmi Chakravarthi
- (India) Prarthana Thombare
- (India) Saketh Myneni

==== International Premier Tennis League ====
- (India) Rohan Bopanna
- (Switzerland) Roger Federer
- (Croatia) Ivan Dodig

==== Exhibition match ====
- (Belgium) Kim Clijsters
