= 2005 AP Tourism Hyderabad Open =

- Date: 7–12 February
- Edition: 3rd
- Category: Tier IV
- Draw: 32S / 16D
- Prize money: $140,000
- Surface: Hard / outdoor
- Location: Hyderabad, Andhra Pradesh, India

Champions

Singles
- (India) Sania Mirza

Doubles
- (China) Yan Zi / (China) Zheng Jie
| ← 2004 · | AP Tourism Hyderabad Open | · 2006 → |

The 2005 Hyderabad Open was a WTA women's tennis tournament held in Hyderabad, Andhra Pradesh, India from 7 February until 12 February 2005. It was the third edition of the tournament and was part of the Tier IV category of the 2005 WTA Tour. Hometown favourite Sania Mirza, a resident of Hyderabad, become the first Indian woman to win a WTA singles title. She was unseeded and had entered the main draw on a wildcard.

== Finals ==
=== Singles ===
(India) Sania Mirza defeated (Ukraine) Alona Bondarenko, 6–4, 5–7, 6–3

- It was Mirza's only WTA singles title of her career.

=== Doubles ===
(China) Yan Zi / (China) Zheng Jie defeated (China) Li Ting / (China) Sun Tiantian, 6–4, 6–1

== WTA entrants ==
=== Seeds ===
| Country | Player | Rank* | Seed |
|---|---|---|---|
| China | Li Na | 56 | 1 |
| Germany | Anna-Lena Grönefeld | 58 | 2 |
| Russian Federation | Tatiana Panova | 60 | 3 |
| China | Zheng Jie | 61 | 4 |
| Poland | ~~Marta Domachowska~~ | 66 | 5 |
| Thailand | Tamarine Tanasugarn | 67 | 6 |
| Slovakia | Ľubomíra Kurhajcová | 90 | 7 |
| Russian Federation | Maria Kirilenko | 94 | 8 |
| Ukraine | Alona Bondarenko | 107 | 9 |

^{*} Rankings as of 31 January 2005

=== Other entrants ===
The following players received wildcards into the singles main draw:

- (India) Ankita Bhambri
- (India) Sania Mirza
- (Israel) Shahar Pe'er

The following players received entry from the qualifying draw:

- (Uzbekistan) Akgul Amanmuradova
- (Slovakia) Jarmila Gajdošová
- (China) Li Ting
- (Luxembourg) Mandy Minella

The following players received entry through the Lucky loser spot:

- (Japan) Shiho Hisamatsu
- (Belarus) Tatiana Poutchek
