= 2005 AP Tourism Hyderabad Open – Doubles =

Doubles
- 2005 AP Tourism Hyderabad Open

Final
- Champions: (China) Yan Zi (China) Zheng Jie
- Runners-up: (China) Li Ting (China) Sun Tiantian
- Score: 6–4, 6–1

Details
- Draw: 16
- Seeds: 4

Events
Singles	Doubles
← 2004 ·	AP Tourism Hyderabad Open	· 2006 →

Liezel Huber and Sania Mirza were the defending champions, but only Mirza chose to participate that year. She paired up with Shikha Uberoi but lost in the quarterfinals to Yan Zi and Zheng Jie.

Yan and Zheng won the title, defeating Li Ting and Sun Tiantian 6–4, 6–1 in an all-Chinese final.

== Seeds ==
1. (Germany) Anna-Lena Grönefeld / (United States) Martina Navratilova (quarterfinals, Retired)
2. (China) Li Ting / (China) Sun Tiantian (final)
3. (China) Yan Zi / (China) Zheng Jie (champions)
4. (Russia) Maria Kirilenko / (Thailand) Tamarine Tanasugarn (semifinals)

== Draw ==
Key

- Q = Qualifier
- WC = Wild card
- LL = Lucky loser
- Alt = Alternate
- ITF = ITF entry
- PR = Protected ranking
- SR = Special ranking
- SE = Special exempt
- JE = Junior exempt
- JR = Junior Accelerator Programme entrant
- CO = College Accelerator Programme entrant
- NG = Next Gen Accelerator Program entrant
- w/o = Walkover
- r = Retired
- d = Defaulted

=== Draw ===
First round
1	(Germany) A-L Grönefeld (United States) M Navratilova	6	6
(Japan) S Hisamatsu (Japan) R Tezuka	2	1
Q	(Uzbekistan) A Amanmuradova (Russia) T Panova	6	6
(Ukraine) A Bondarenko (Ukraine) K Bondarenko	0	4
3	(China) Z Yan (China) J Zheng	6	6
(Hungary) M Czink (Czech Republic) L Němečková	4	1
WC	(India) S Mirza (India) S Uberoi	6	7
(Chinese Taipei) C-w Chan (China) N Li	4	5
(Italy) M Santangelo (Romania) A Vanc	6	1	6
(Russia) E Bychkova (Belarus) T Poutchek	2	6	3
(Russia) N Bratchikova (Australia) E Dominikovic	6	5	5
4	(Russia) M Kirilenko (Thailand) T Tanasugarn	3	7	7
(Israel) T Obziler (Israel) S Pe'er	2	2
(Russia) A Rodionova (Argentina) M E Salerni	6	6
(Australia) M Adamczak (Australia) N Kriz	6	0	1
2	(China) T Li (China) T Sun	2	6	6

Quarterfinals
1	(Germany) A-L Grönefeld (United States) M Navratilova	2^{r}
Q	(Uzbekistan) A Amanmuradova (Russia) T Panova	3
3	(China) Z Yan (China) J Zheng	7	6
WC	(India) S Mirza (India) S Uberoi	5	1
(Italy) M Santangelo (Romania) A Vanc	2	6	4
4	(Russia) M Kirilenko (Thailand) T Tanasugarn	6	4	6
(Russia) A Rodionova (Argentina) M E Salerni	4	3
2	(China) T Li (China) T Sun	6	6

Semifinals
Q	(Uzbekistan) A Amanmuradova (Russia) T Panova	1	4
3	(China) Z Yan (China) J Zheng	6	6
4	(Russia) M Kirilenko (Thailand) T Tanasugarn	1	0
2	(China) T Li (China) T Sun	6	6

Final
3	(China) Z Yan (China) J Zheng	6	6
2	(China) T Li (China) T Sun	4	1
