= 2003 AP Tourism Hyderabad Open – Singles =

Singles
- 2003 AP Tourism Hyderabad Open

Final
- Champion: (Thailand) Tamarine Tanasugarn
- Runner-up: (Uzbekistan) Iroda Tulyaganova
- Score: 6–4, 6–4

Details
- Draw: 32
- Seeds: 8

Events
Singles	Doubles
AP Tourism Hyderabad Open	· 2004 →

This was the first edition of the tournament.

Tamarine Tanasugarn won in the final, defeating Iroda Tulyaganova 6–4, 6–4.

== Seeds ==
1. (Argentina) Clarisa Fernández (first round)
2. (Thailand) Tamarine Tanasugarn (champion)
3. (Russia) Elena Likhovtseva (first round)
4. (France) Mary Pierce (quarterfinals)
5. (Uzbekistan) Iroda Tulyaganova (final)
6. (Spain) Cristina Torrens Valero (second round)
7. (Indonesia) Angelique Widjaja (second round)
8. (Croatia) Silvija Talaja (quarterfinals)

== Draw ==
Key

- Q = Qualifier
- WC = Wild card
- LL = Lucky loser
- Alt = Alternate
- ITF = ITF entry
- PR = Protected ranking
- SR = Special ranking
- SE = Special exempt
- JE = Junior exempt
- JR = Junior Accelerator Programme entrant
- CO = College Accelerator Programme entrant
- NG = Next Gen Accelerator Program entrant
- w/o = Walkover
- r = Retired
- d = Defaulted

=== Finals ===
Semifinals
(Japan) Akiko Morigami	6	3	2
5	(Uzbekistan) Iroda Tulyaganova	2	6	6
(Italy) Flavia Pennetta	5	4
2	(Thailand) Tamarine Tanasugarn	7	6

Final
5	(Uzbekistan) Iroda Tulyaganova	4	4
2	(Thailand) Tamarine Tanasugarn	6	6

=== Top half ===
First round
1	(Argentina) C Fernández	2	4
(Japan) A Morigami	6	6
(Ukraine) J Vakulenko	4	3
(Romania) A Vanc	6	6
(Czech Republic) R Voráčová	2	2
LL	(China) T Sun	6	6
(Indonesia) W Prakusya	3	4
8	(Croatia) S Talaja	6	6
3/WC	(Russia) E Likhovtseva	2	3
(Israel) T Obziler	6	6
(Italy) An Serra Zanetti	6^{10}	7	6
(Russia) E Kulikovskaya	7^{12}	5	0
(Italy) Ad Serra Zanetti	5	3
(Japan) S Obata	7	6
(Hungary) K Marosi	3	3
5	(Uzbekistan) I Tulyaganova	6	6

Second round
(Japan) A Morigami	6	6
(Romania) A Vanc	3	4
LL	(China) T Sun	2	2
8	(Croatia) S Talaja	6	6
(Israel) T Obziler	7^{7}	6
(Italy) An Serra Zanetti	6^{2}	0
(Japan) S Obata	5	3
5	(Uzbekistan) I Tulyaganova	7	6

Quarterfinals
(Japan) A Morigami	6	6
8	(Croatia) S Talaja	4	2
(Israel) T Obziler	6	2	0
5	(Uzbekistan) I Tulyaganova	4	6	6

Semifinals
(Japan) A Morigami	6	3	2
5	(Uzbekistan) I Tulyaganova	2	6	6

=== Bottom half ===
First round
6	(Spain) C Torrens Valero	7	6
(South Korea) M-r Jeon	5	0
(Italy) F Pennetta	1	6	6
(Slovakia) M Suchá	6	3	2
WC	(India) S Mirza	6	1	2
(Australia) E Dominikovic	2	6	6
Q	(China) J Zheng	3	6	3
4	(France) M Pierce	6	0	6
7	(Indonesia) A Widjaja	1	6	6
(Croatia) J Kostanić	6	4	3
Q	(Russia) M Kirilenko	6	6
(Russia) A Rodionova	4	3
(Belarus) T Poutchek	6	4	7
Q	(India) M Malhotra	2	6	5
Q	(Ukraine) Y Beygelzimer	4	6	4
2	(Thailand) T Tanasugarn	6	4	6

Second round
6	(Spain) C Torrens Valero	2	0
(Italy) F Pennetta	6	6
(Australia) E Dominikovic	1	3
4	(France) M Pierce	6	6
7	(Indonesia) A Widjaja	7	5	3
Q	(Russia) M Kirilenko	5	7	6
(Belarus) T Poutchek	3	3
2	(Thailand) T Tanasugarn	6	6

Quarterfinals
(Italy) F Pennetta	7^{7}	6
4	(France) M Pierce	6^{4}	3
Q	(Russia) M Kirilenko	6^{6}	3
2	(Thailand) T Tanasugarn	7^{8}	6

Semifinals
(Italy) F Pennetta	5	4
2	(Thailand) T Tanasugarn	7	6
