= 2004 AP Tourism Hyderabad Open – Singles =

Singles
- 2004 AP Tourism Hyderabad Open

Final
- Champion: (Australia) Nicole Pratt
- Runner-up: (Russia) Maria Kirilenko
- Score: 7–6^{(7–3)}, 6–1

Details
- Draw: 32
- Seeds: 8

Events
Singles	Doubles
← 2003 ·	WTA Indian Open	· 2005 →

Tamarine Tanasugarn was the defending champion, but lost in the semifinals to Maria Kirilenko.

In the final, Nicole Pratt defeated Kirilenko 7–6^{(7–3)}, 6–1 to win her title.

== Seeds ==
1. (Japan) Saori Obata (first round)
2. (France) Marion Bartoli (semifinals)
3. (Thailand) Tamarine Tanasugarn (semifinals)
4. (Australia) Nicole Pratt (champion)
5. (Croatia) Jelena Kostanić (quarterfinals)
6. (China) Zheng Jie (quarterfinals)
7. (Italy) Maria Elena Camerin (second round)
8. (Slovakia) Ľubomíra Kurhajcová (second round)

== Draw ==
Key

- Q = Qualifier
- WC = Wild card
- LL = Lucky loser
- Alt = Alternate
- ITF = ITF entry
- PR = Protected ranking
- SR = Special ranking
- SE = Special exempt
- JE = Junior exempt
- JR = Junior Accelerator Programme entrant
- CO = College Accelerator Programme entrant
- NG = Next Gen Accelerator Program entrant
- w/o = Walkover
- r = Retired
- d = Defaulted

=== Finals ===
Semifinals
(Russia) Maria Kirilenko	6	6
3	(Thailand) Tamarine Tanasugarn	3	2
4	(Australia) Nicole Pratt	4	7^{7}	6
2	(France) Marion Bartoli	6	6^{3}	2

Final
(Russia) Maria Kirilenko	6^{3}	1
4	(Australia) Nicole Pratt	7^{7}	6

=== Top half ===
First round
1	(Japan) S Obata	4	2
(Japan) Y Yoshida	6	6
(Russia) M Kirilenko	6	7
Q	(United States) N Uberoi	3	5
Q	(Austria) B Schwartz	6^{5}	2
(Indonesia) A Widjaja	7^{7}	6
(Russia) A Rodionova	3	7	2
7	(Italy) ME Camerin	6	5	6
3	(Thailand) T Tanasugarn	6	6
(Russia) E Kulikovskaya	4	0
(China) T Sun	4	4
Q	(Israel) S Pe'er	6	6
(Belarus) T Poutchek	7^{7}	6
PR	(Romania) R Dragomir	6^{5}	4
(Ukraine) Y Beygelzimer	4	6^{5}
6	(China) J Zheng	6	7^{7}

Second round
(Japan) Y Yoshida	2	3
(Russia) M Kirilenko	6	6
(Indonesia) A Widjaja	6	6
7	(Italy) ME Camerin	3	4
3	(Thailand) T Tanasugarn	6	6
Q	(Israel) S Pe'er	3	2
(Belarus) T Poutchek	3	2
6	(China) J Zheng	6	6

Quarterfinals
(Russia) M Kirilenko	6	6
(Indonesia) A Widjaja	1	2
3	(Thailand) T Tanasugarn	6	6
6	(China) J Zheng	3	1

Semifinals
(Russia) M Kirilenko	6	6
3	(Thailand) T Tanasugarn	3	2

=== Bottom half ===
First round
5	(Croatia) J Kostanić	6	4	6
WC	(India) I Lakhani	3	6	2
(Russia) V Dushevina	6	6
(Germany) A-L Grönefeld	3	2
(Germany) J Schruff	3	2
(Italy) Ad Serra Zanetti	6	6
WC	(India) S Mirza	6	3	2
4	(Australia) N Pratt	4	6	6
8	(Slovakia) Ľ Kurhajcová	6	6
(Italy) An Serra Zanetti	3	3
(Bosnia and Herzegovina) M Jugić-Salkić	3	6	6
(China) Z Yan	6	4	1
(Russia) G Fokina	6	6^{4}	6
(Romania) A Vanc	2	7^{7}	1
Q	(India) A Bhambri	1	1
2	(France) M Bartoli	6	6

Second round
5	(Croatia) J Kostanić	6	6
(Russia) V Dushevina	1	3
(Italy) Ad Serra Zanetti	6^{4}	2
4	(Australia) N Pratt	7^{7}	6
8	(Slovakia) Ľ Kurhajcová	6^{7}	6	4
(Bosnia and Herzegovina) M Jugić-Salkić	7^{9}	3	6
(Russia) G Fokina	2	4
2	(France) M Bartoli	6	6

Quarterfinals
5	(Croatia) J Kostanić	4	5
4	(Australia) N Pratt	6	7
(Bosnia and Herzegovina) M Jugić-Salkić	5	2
2	(France) M Bartoli	7	6

Semifinals
4	(Australia) N Pratt	4	7^{7}	6
2	(France) M Bartoli	6	6^{3}	2
