= 2003 AP Tourism Hyderabad Open =

- Date: 3–9 February
- Edition: 1st
- Category: Tier IV
- Draw: 32S / 16D
- Prize money: $140,000
- Surface: Hard / outdoor
- Location: Hyderabad, India

Champions

Singles
- (Thailand) Tamarine Tanasugarn

Doubles
- (Russia) Elena Likhovtseva / (Uzbekistan) Iroda Tulyaganova
WTA Indian Open	· 2004 →

The 2003 AP Tourism Hyderabad Open was the first edition of the WTA tournament held in Hyderabad, Andhra Pradesh, India organized for women's professional tennis. It was held from 3 February until 9 February 2003 on outdoor hardcourts. Second-seeded Tamarine Tanasugarn won the singles title. Indian player Sania Mirza made her debut at this tournament in her hometown Hyderabad.

== Finals ==
=== Singles ===
(Thailand) Tamarine Tanasugarn defeated (Uzbekistan) Iroda Tulyaganova 6–4, 6–4

- It was Tanasugarn's only singles title of the year and the 1st of her career.

=== Doubles ===
- (Russia) Elena Likhovtseva / (Uzbekistan) Iroda Tulyaganova defeated (Russia) Eugenia Kulikovskaya / (Belarus) Tatiana Poutchek 6–4, 6–4

== WTA entrants ==
=== Seeds ===
Seed	Country	Player	Rank
1	ARG	Clarisa Fernández	28
2	THA	Tamarine Tanasugarn	32
3	RUS	Elena Likhovtseva	36
4	FRA	Mary Pierce	49
5	UZB	Iroda Tulyaganova	57
6	ESP	Cristina Torrens Valero	66
7	INA	Angelique Widjaja	62
8	CRO	Silvija Talaja	79

- Rankings as of 25 January 2003.

=== Other entrants ===
The following players received wildcards into the main draw:

- (Russia) Elena Likhovtseva
- (India) Sania Mirza

The following players received entry from the qualifying draw:

- (Ukraine) Yuliya Beygelzimer
- (Russia) Maria Kirilenko
- (India) Manisha Malhotra
- (China) Zheng Jie

The following players received entry through the lucky loser spot:

- (China) Sun Tiantian
