= 2003 AP Tourism Hyderabad Open – Doubles =

Doubles
- 2003 AP Tourism Hyderabad Open

Final
- Champions: (Russia) Elena Likhovtseva (Uzbekistan) Iroda Tulyaganova
- Runners-up: (Russia) Eugenia Kulikovskaya (Belarus) Tatiana Poutchek
- Score: 6–4, 6–4

Details
- Draw: 16
- Seeds: 4

Events
Singles	Doubles
AP Tourism Hyderabad Open	· 2004 →

This was the first edition of the tournament.

Elena Likhovtseva and Iroda Tulyaganova won in the final, defeating Eugenia Kulikovskaya and Tatiana Poutchek 6–4, 6–4.

== Seeds ==
1. (Russia) Elena Likhovtseva / (Uzbekistan) Iroda Tulyaganova (champions)
2. (Indonesia) Wynne Prakusya / (Indonesia) Angelique Widjaja (first round)
3. (Russia) Eugenia Kulikovskaya / (Belarus) Tatiana Poutchek (final)
4. (Croatia) Jelena Kostanić / (Hungary) Katalin Marosi (semifinals)

== Draw ==
Key

- Q = Qualifier
- WC = Wild card
- LL = Lucky loser
- Alt = Alternate
- ITF = ITF entry
- PR = Protected ranking
- SR = Special ranking
- SE = Special exempt
- JE = Junior exempt
- JR = Junior Accelerator Programme entrant
- CO = College Accelerator Programme entrant
- NG = Next Gen Accelerator Program entrant
- w/o = Walkover
- r = Retired
- d = Defaulted

=== Main ===
First round
1	(Russia) E Likhovtseva (Uzbekistan) I Tulyaganova	7^{7}	6
Q	(Japan) A Morigami (Japan) S Obata	6^{3}	3
WC	(India) S Mirza (France) M Pierce	6	6
WC	(India) R Chakravarthi (India) SJ Jayaram	1	4
4	(Croatia) J Kostanić (Hungary) K Marosi	6	6
(China) Z Yan (China) J Zheng	2	2
(Argentina) C Fernández (Venezuela) M Vento-Kabchi	6	3	6
(Italy) F Pennetta (Romania) A Vanc	1	6	1
(South Africa) K Grant (India) M Malhotra	6^{3}	4
(Ukraine) Y Beygelzimer (Russia) A Rodionova	7^{7}	6
(Croatia) S Talaja (Czech Republic) R Voráčová	4	3
3	(Russia) E Kulikovskaya (Belarus) T Poutchek	6	6
(China) T Li (China) T Sun	6	6
(Italy) Ad Serra Zanetti (Italy) An Serra Zanetti	2	3
(Australia) T Musgrave (Thailand) T Tanasugarn	2	7^{7}	6
2	(Indonesia) W Prakusya (Indonesia) A Widjaja	6	6^{5}	4

Quarterfinals
1	(Russia) E Likhovtseva (Uzbekistan) I Tulyaganova	3	6	6
WC	(India) S Mirza (France) M Pierce	6	1	4
4	(Croatia) J Kostanić (Hungary) K Marosi	6	6
(Italy) F Pennetta (Romania) A Vanc	4	1
(Ukraine) Y Beygelzimer (Russia) A Rodionova	3	3
3	(Russia) E Kulikovskaya (Belarus) T Poutchek	6	6
(China) T Li (China) T Sun	6	6
(Australia) T Musgrave (Thailand) T Tanasugarn	1	3

Semifinals
1	(Russia) E Likhovtseva (Uzbekistan) I Tulyaganova	6	4	7^{7}
4	(Croatia) J Kostanić (Hungary) K Marosi	4	6	6^{2}
3	(Czech Republic) E Kulikovskaya (Belarus) T Poutchek	6	6^{7}	7^{7}
(China) T Li (China) T Sun	4	7^{9}	6^{3}

Final
1	(Russia) E Likhovtseva (Uzbekistan) I Tulyaganova	6	6
3	(Russia) E Kulikovskaya (Belarus) T Poutchek	4	4
