= 2016 Connecticut Open – Singles =

Singles
- 2016 Connecticut Open

Final
- Champion: (Poland) Agnieszka Radwańska
- Runner-up: (Ukraine) Elina Svitolina
- Score: 6–1, 7–6^{(7–3)}

Details
- Draw: 30

Events
Singles	Doubles
- Connecticut Open

Petra Kvitová was the two-time defending champion, but lost in the semifinals to Agnieszka Radwańska.

Radwańska went on to win the title, defeating Elina Svitolina in the final, 6–1, 7–6^{(7–3)}.

== Seeds ==
The top two seeds received a bye into the second round.

1. (Poland) Agnieszka Radwańska (champion)
2. (Italy) Roberta Vinci (quarterfinals)
3. (United States) Madison Keys (withdrew)
4. (Russia) Svetlana Kuznetsova (withdrew)
5. (United Kingdom) Johanna Konta (withdrew)
6. (Czech Republic) Petra Kvitová (semifinals)
7. (Switzerland) Timea Bacsinszky (first round)
8. (Czech Republic) Karolína Plíšková (withdrew)
9. (Russia) Anastasia Pavlyuchenkova (withdrew)
10. (Ukraine) Elina Svitolina (final)
11. (Czech Republic) Barbora Strýcová (withdrew)

== Draw ==
Key

- Q = Qualifier
- WC = Wild card
- LL = Lucky loser
- Alt = Alternate
- ITF = ITF entry
- PR = Protected ranking
- SR = Special ranking
- SE = Special exempt
- JE = Junior exempt
- JR = Junior Accelerator Programme entrant
- CO = College Accelerator Programme entrant
- NG = Next Gen Accelerator Program entrant
- w/o = Walkover
- r = Retired
- d = Defaulted

=== Finals ===
Semifinals
1/WC	(Poland) Agnieszka Radwańska	6	6
6	(Czech Republic) Petra Kvitová	1	1
10	(Ukraine) Elina Svitolina	6	6
LL	(Sweden) Johanna Larsson	4	2

Final
1/WC	(Poland) Agnieszka Radwańska	6	7^{7}
10	(Ukraine) Elina Svitolina	1	6^{3}

=== Top half ===
First round
WC	(Denmark) C Wozniacki	5	2
(Latvia) J Ostapenko	7	6
(France) C Garcia	6	6
(Romania) I-C Begu	1	4
(Switzerland) B Bencic	1	6	5
LL	(Belgium) K Flipkens	6	4	7
6	(Czech Republic) P Kvitová	1	6	6
Q	(United States) L Chirico	6	1	3
Q	(Germany) A Beck	2	1
WC	(Canada) E Bouchard	6	6
(Italy) S Errani	5	2
(Russia) E Makarova	7	6
Q	(Latvia) A Sevastova	7	6
Q	(United States) N Gibbs	5	0

Second round
1/WC	(Poland) A Radwańska	7	6
(Latvia) J Ostapenko	5	1
(France) C Garcia	6^{3}	5
LL	(Belgium) K Flipkens	7^{7}	7
6	(Czech Republic) P Kvitová	6	6
WC	(Canada) E Bouchard	3	2
(Russia) E Makarova	6	6
Q	(Latvia) A Sevastova	3	2

Quarterfinals
1/WC	(Poland) A Radwańska	6	6
LL	(Belgium) K Flipkens	1	4
6	(Czech Republic) P Kvitová	6	6
(Russia) E Makarova	3	1

Semifinals
1/WC	(Poland) A Radwańska	6	6
6	(Czech Republic) P Kvitová	1	1

=== Bottom half ===
First round
10	(Ukraine) E Svitolina	6	5	6
(Russia) D Kasatkina	4	7	0
LL	(Russia) E Rodina	6	5	6
Q	(Greece) M Sakkari	1	7	2
(Netherlands) K Bertens	3	4
LL	(Estonia) A Kontaveit	6	6
(Russia) E Vesnina	6	6
LL	(Italy) C Giorgi	1	4
7	(Switzerland) T Bacsinszky	5	2
LL	(Sweden) J Larsson	7	6
WC	(United States) S Rogers	6	6
(France) K Mladenovic	1	1
LL	(United States) K Day	0	3
Q	(Croatia) A Konjuh	6	6

Second round
10	(Ukraine) E Svitolina	6	6
LL	(Russia) E Rodina	3	1
LL	(Estonia) A Kontaveit	4	0^{r}
(Russia) E Vesnina	6	1
LL	(Sweden) J Larsson	7^{7}	6
WC	(United States) S Rogers	6^{1}	4
Q	(Croatia) A Konjuh	2	2
2	(Italy) R Vinci	6	6

Quarterfinals
10	(Ukraine) E Svitolina	6	6
(Russia) E Vesnina	3	1
LL	(Sweden) J Larsson	7^{11}	6
2	(Italy) R Vinci	6^{9}	1

Semifinals
10	(Ukraine) E Svitolina	6	6
LL	(Sweden) J Larsson	4	2

== Qualifying ==
=== Seeds ===
1. (Kazakhstan) Yulia Putintseva (first round)
2. (Germany) Annika Beck (qualified)
3. (Germany) Anna-Lena Friedsam (first round)
4. (Kazakhstan) Yaroslava Shvedova (withdrew, still playing in Cincinnati)
5. (Latvia) Anastasija Sevastova (qualified)
6. (Montenegro) Danka Kovinić (first round)
7. (United States) Varvara Lepchenko (second round)
8. (Croatia) Mirjana Lučić-Baroni (second round)
9. (Slovakia) Anna Karolína Schmiedlová (first round)
10. (Belgium) Kirsten Flipkens (second round, lucky loser)
11. (Ukraine) Kateryna Bondarenko (second round, retired)
12. (China) Zheng Saisai (first round)
13. (China) Wang Qiang (first round)

=== Qualifiers ===
1. (United States) Nicole Gibbs
2. (Germany) Annika Beck
3. (United States) Louisa Chirico
4. (Greece) Maria Sakkari
5. (Latvia) Anastasija Sevastova
6. (Croatia) Ana Konjuh

=== Lucky losers ===
1. (United States) Kayla Day
2. (Belgium) Kirsten Flipkens
3. (Italy) Camila Giorgi
4. (Estonia) Anett Kontaveit
5. (Sweden) Johanna Larsson
6. (Russia) Evgeniya Rodina

=== Draw ===
==== First qualifier ====
First round
1	(Kazakhstan) Yulia Putintseva	6	4	2
(Germany) Carina Witthöft	2	6	6
Alt	(Russia) Evgeniya Rodina	6	6
(Bulgaria) Tsvetana Pironkova	3	0
WC	(United States) Ellyse Hamlin	0	0
(United States) Nicole Gibbs	6	6
WC	(United States) Julia Elbaba	3	2
11	(Ukraine) Kateryna Bondarenko	6	6

Second round
(Germany) Carina Witthöft	3	4
Alt	(Russia) Evgeniya Rodina	6	6
(United States) Nicole Gibbs	3
11	(Ukraine) Kateryna Bondarenko	1^{r}

Qualifying competition
Alt	(Russia) Evgeniya Rodina	0	3
(United States) Nicole Gibbs	6	6

==== Second qualifier ====
First round
2	(Germany) Annika Beck	6	6
(Czech Republic) Denisa Allertová	2	2
WC	(United States) Danielle Collins	6	6^{9}	6
(Switzerland) Stefanie Vögele	3	7^{11}	3
(Colombia) Mariana Duque Mariño	1	2
(Ukraine) Kateryna Kozlova	6	6
(Estonia) Anett Kontaveit	0	6	7^{11}
9	(Slovakia) Anna Karolína Schmiedlová	6	3	6^{9}

Second round
2	(Germany) Annika Beck	7	7
WC	(United States) Danielle Collins	5	5
(Ukraine) Kateryna Kozlova	2	7^{7}	4
(Estonia) Anett Kontaveit	6	6^{2}	6

Qualifying competition
2	(Germany) Annika Beck	6	2	6
(Estonia) Anett Kontaveit	2	6	4

==== Third qualifier ====
First round
3	(Germany) Anna-Lena Friedsam	0	2
(Ukraine) Lesia Tsurenko	6	6
(Turkey) Çağla Büyükakçay	7^{7}	6
WC	(United States) Sofia Kenin	6^{5}	4
(United States) Louisa Chirico	6	6
(United States) Lauren Davis	0	2
(Romania) Sorana Cîrstea	3	6	6
12	(China) Zheng Saisai	6	3	3

Second round
(Ukraine) Lesia Tsurenko	6	6
(Turkey) Çağla Büyükakçay	3	2
(United States) Louisa Chirico	6	6
(Romania) Sorana Cîrstea	4	4

Qualifying competition
(Ukraine) Lesia Tsurenko	3	4^{r}
(United States) Louisa Chirico	6	4

==== Fourth qualifier ====
First round
13	(China) Wang Qiang	1	4
(Germany) Mona Barthel	6	6
(Italy) Camila Giorgi	6	6
(France) Pauline Parmentier	2	4
(United Kingdom) Heather Watson	1	3
(Greece) Maria Sakkari	6	6
(Belarus) Aliaksandra Sasnovich	0	3
8	(Croatia) Mirjana Lučić-Baroni	6	6

Second round
(Germany) Mona Barthel	2	2
(Italy) Camila Giorgi	6	6
(Greece) Maria Sakkari	6	6
8	(Croatia) Mirjana Lučić-Baroni	3	4

Qualifying competition
(Italy) Camila Giorgi	3	3
(Greece) Maria Sakkari	6	6

==== Fifth qualifier ====
First round
5	(Latvia) Anastasija Sevastova	6	3	6
(Poland) Magda Linette	3	6	3
(Slovakia) Kristína Kučová	5	5^{r}
(Spain) Lara Arruabarrena	7	3
WC	(United States) Kayla Day	6	6
(United Kingdom) Naomi Broady	2	3
WC	(Slovakia) Daniela Hantuchová	6	3	1
10	(Belgium) Kirsten Flipkens	4	6	6

Second round
5	(Latvia) Anastasija Sevastova	3	6	6
(Spain) Lara Arruabarrena	6	4	1
WC	(United States) Kayla Day	3	6	6
10	(Belgium) Kirsten Flipkens	6	4	1

Qualifying competition
5	(Latvia) Anastasija Sevastova	6	6^{4}	6
WC	(United States) Kayla Day	1	7^{7}	2

==== Sixth qualifier ====
First round
6	(Montenegro) Danka Kovinić	4	4
(Japan) Nao Hibino	6	6
(Croatia) Ana Konjuh	7	4	6
(Switzerland) Viktorija Golubic	5	6	4
(Japan) Naomi Osaka	2	4
(Sweden) Johanna Larsson	6	6
(United States) Alison Riske	2	3
7	(United States) Varvara Lepchenko	6	6

Second round
(Japan) Nao Hibino	6	4	1
(Croatia) Ana Konjuh	3	6	6
(Sweden) Johanna Larsson	6	7
7	(United States) Varvara Lepchenko	3	5

Qualifying competition
(Croatia) Ana Konjuh	6	6
(Sweden) Johanna Larsson	3	1
