= 2011 Citi Open – Singles =

Singles
- 2011 Citi Open

Final
- Champion: (Russia) Nadia Petrova
- Runner-up: (Israel) Shahar Pe'er
- Score: 7–5, 6–2

Events
Singles	Doubles
Citi Open	· 2012 →

Nadia Petrova won the first edition of this tournament, defeating Shahar Pe'er 7–5, 6–2 in the final.

== Seeds ==
1. (Israel) Shahar Pe'er (final)
2. (Russia) Nadia Petrova (champion)
3. (Austria) Tamira Paszek (semifinals)
4. (Australia) Jelena Dokić (first round)
5. (Serbia) Bojana Jovanovski (quarterfinals)
6. (United Kingdom) Elena Baltacha (second round)
7. (India) Sania Mirza (first round)
8. (Italy) Alberta Brianti (quarterfinals)

== Draw ==
=== Key ===
- Q = Qualifier
- WC = Wild card
- LL = Lucky loser
- Alt = Alternate
- ITF = ITF entry
- PR = Protected ranking
- SR = Special ranking
- SE = Special exempt
- JE = Junior exempt
- JR = Junior Accelerator Programme entrant
- CO = College Accelerator Programme entrant
- NG = Next Gen Accelerator Program entrant
- w/o = Walkover
- r = Retired
- d = Defaulted

=== Finals ===
Semifinals
1	(Israel) Shahar Pe'er	3	7^{7}	6
3	(Austria) Tamira Paszek	6	6^{2}	4
(United States) Irina Falconi	6	1	3
2/WC	(Russia) Nadia Petrova	1	6	6

Final
1	(Israel) Shahar Pe'er	5	2
2/WC	(Russia) Nadia Petrova	7	6

=== Top half ===
First round
1	(Israel) Shahar Pe'er	6	6
Q	(Japan) Ryoko Fuda	4	2
(Russia) Alla Kudryavtseva	4	6	6
(South Africa) Chanelle Scheepers	6	4	2
(United States) Varvara Lepchenko	4	6	6
WC	(United States) Sloane Stephens	6	4	3
(United Kingdom) Anne Keothavong	3	4
8	(Italy) Alberta Brianti	6	6
3	(Austria) Tamira Paszek	7^{7}	3	6
(United States) Melanie Oudin	6^{2}	6	2
PR	(Hungary) Melinda Czink	6^{5}	5
Q	(United States) Madison Brengle	7^{7}	7
(Greece) Eleni Daniilidou	4	1
(United Kingdom) Heather Watson	6	6
(Canada) Stéphanie Dubois	7	6
7	(India) Sania Mirza	5	4

Second round
1	(Israel) S Pe'er	6	6
(Russia) A Kudryavtseva	1	4
(United States) V Lepchenko	1	2
8	(Italy) A Brianti	6	6
3	(Austria) T Paszek	6	6
Q	(United States) M Brengle	3	1
(United Kingdom) H Watson	6	5	1
(Canada) S Dubois	3	7	6

Quarterfinals
1	(Israel) S Pe'er	6	6
8	(Italy) A Brianti	1	2
3	(Austria) T Paszek	5	6	7^{7}
(Canada) S Dubois	7	4	6^{2}

Semifinals
1	(Israel) S Pe'er	3	7^{7}	6
3	(Austria) T Paszek	6	6^{2}	4

=== Bottom half ===
First round
6	(United Kingdom) Elena Baltacha	6	7^{7}
(Kazakhstan) Yaroslava Shvedova	2	6^{5}
(France) Virginie Razzano	6	6
WC	(Japan) Misaki Doi	2	2
(Belarus) Olga Govortsova	3	4
(United States) Irina Falconi	6	6
(China) Shuai Zhang	6	6
4	(Australia) Jelena Dokić	3	4
5	(Serbia) Bojana Jovanovski	6	6
Q	(Slovenia) Petra Rampre	0	2
(United States) Jill Craybas	2	6	6
(China) Jie Zheng	6	3	2
(United States) Alison Riske	3	2
WC	(Canada) Eugenie Bouchard	6	6
Q	(United States) Alexandra Mueller	2	2
2/WC	(Russia) Nadia Petrova	6	6

Second round
6	(United Kingdom) E Baltacha	4	2
(France) V Razzano	6	6
(United States) I Falconi	6	0
(China) S Zhang	4	0^{r}
5	(Serbia) B Jovanovski	6	5	6
(United States) J Craybas	4	7	4
WC	(Canada) E Bouchard	2	2
2/WC	(Russia) N Petrova	6	6

Quarterfinals
(France) V Razzano	4	3
(United States) I Falconi	6	6
5	(Serbia) B Jovanovski	6^{4}	5
2/WC	(Russia) N Petrova	7^{7}	7

Semifinals
(United States) I Falconi	6	1	3
2/WC	(Russia) N Petrova	1	6	6

== Qualifying ==
=== Players ===
==== Seeds ====
1. (United States) Julia Cohen (second round)
2. (United States) Lauren Albanese (second round)
3. (Slovenia) Petra Rampre (qualified)
4. (United States) Madison Brengle (qualified)
5. (United States) Beatrice Capra (qualifying competition)
6. (Japan) Ryoko Fuda (qualified)
7. (Australia) Tammi Patterson (second round)
8. (United States) Asia Muhammed (qualifying competition)

==== Qualifiers ====
1. (United States) Alexandra Mueller
2. (Japan) Ryoko Fuda
3. (Slovenia) Petra Rampre
4. (United States) Madison Brengle

=== Qualifying draw ===
==== First qualifier ====
First round			Second round				Qualifying competition
			1	(United States) Julia Cohen	1	0
(United States) Danielle Mills	2	2		(United States) Alexandra Mueller	6	6
(United States) Alexandra Mueller	6	6						(United States) Alexandra Mueller	3	6	7^{7}
							8	(United States) Asia Muhammed	6	4	6^{5}
			WC	(United States) Skylar Morton	4	2
			8	(United States) Asia Muhammed	6	6

==== Second qualifier ====
First round				Second round				Qualifying competition
				2	(United States) Lauren Albanese	6^{5}	0^{r}
					(Germany) Kim Grajdek	7^{7}	1
									(Germany) Kim Grajdek	6	3	0
WC	(India) Tara Iyer	6^{4}	2					6	(Japan) Ryoko Fuda	2	6	6
	(Latvia) Līga Dekmeijere	7^{7}	6		(Latvia) Līga Dekmeijere	0	0
				6	(Japan) Ryoko Fuda	6	6

==== Third qualifier ====
First round				Second round					Qualifying competition
				3	(Slovenia) Petra Rampre	6	7^{9}
				WC	(United States) Sachia Vickery	3	6^{7}
									3	(Slovenia) Petra Rampre	6	6
WC	(United States) Eleanor Peters	1	0							(Canada) Gabriela Dabrowski	4	1
	(Canada) Gabriela Dabrowski	6	6		(Canada) Gabriela Dabrowski	6	3	7^{7}
				7	(Australia) Tammi Patterson	3	6	6^{2}

==== Fourth qualifier ====
First round				Second round				Qualifying competition
				4	(United States) Madison Brengle	6	6
	(United States) Whitney Jones	6	6		(United States) Whitney Jones	2	1
WC	(Greece) Valentini Grammatikopoulou	2	2					4	(United States) Madison Brengle	7^{7}	6^{4}	6
								5	(United States) Beatrice Capra	6^{4}	7^{7}	1
					(United States) Katie Ruckert	2	0
				5	(United States) Beatrice Capra	6	6
