= 2016 Connecticut Open =

- Date: August 21–27
- Edition: 48th
- Category: WTA Premier
- Draw: 30S / 16D
- Prize money: $695,900
- Surface: Hard / outdoor
- Location: New Haven, United States
- Venue: Cullman-Heyman Tennis Center

Champions

Singles
- (Poland) Agnieszka Radwańska

Doubles
- (India) Sania Mirza / (Romania) Monica Niculescu
← 2015 ·	Connecticut Open	· 2017 →

The 2016 Connecticut Open (also known as the 2016 Connecticut Open presented by United Technologies for sponsorship reasons) was a women's tennis tournament played on outdoor hard courts. It was the 48th edition of the Connecticut Open, and part of the Premier Series of the 2016 WTA Tour. It took place at the Cullman-Heyman Tennis Center in New Haven, Connecticut, United States, from August 21 through August 27. It was the last event of the 2016 US Open Series before the 2016 US Open.

== Points and prize money ==
=== Point distribution ===
Event	W	F	SF	QF	Round of 16	Round of 32	Q	Q3	Q2	Q1
Singles	470	305	185	100	55	1	25	18	13	1
Doubles	470	305	185	100	1	—	—	—	—	—

=== Prize money ===
Event	W	F	SF	QF	Round of 16	Round of 32	Q3	Q2	Q1
Singles	$130,300	$69,380	$37,020	$19,885	$10,665	$5,820	$3,045	$1,620	$895
Doubles	$40,650	$21,700	$11,865	$6,035	$3,270	—	—	—	—

== Singles main-draw entrants (Note: This is a list of players who have committed to the tournament. A full entry list will be released in July) ==
=== Seeds ===
Country	Player	Rank*	Seed
POL	Agnieszka Radwańska	5	1
ITA	Roberta Vinci	8	2
~~USA~~	~~Madison Keys~~	~~9~~	~~3~~
~~RUS~~	~~Svetlana Kuznetsova~~	~~10~~	~~4~~
~~GBR~~	~~Johanna Konta~~	~~13~~	~~5~~
CZE	Petra Kvitová	14	6
SUI	Timea Bacsinszky	15	7
~~CZE~~	~~Karolína Plíšková~~	~~17~~	~~8~~
~~RUS~~	~~Anastasia Pavlyuchenkova~~	~~18~~	~~9~~
UKR	Elina Svitolina	19	10
~~CZE~~	~~Barbora Strýcová~~	~~20~~	~~11~~

- Rankings are as of 15 August 2016

=== Other entrants ===
The following players received wildcards into the singles main draw:

- (Canada) Eugenie Bouchard
- (Poland) Agnieszka Radwańska
- (United States) Shelby Rogers
- (Denmark) Caroline Wozniacki

The following players received entry from the qualifying draw:

- (Germany) Annika Beck
- (United States) Louisa Chirico
- (United States) Nicole Gibbs
- (Croatia) Ana Konjuh
- (Greece) Maria Sakkari
- (Latvia) Anastasija Sevastova

The following players received entry as lucky losers:

- (United States) Kayla Day
- (Belgium) Kirsten Flipkens
- (Italy) Camila Giorgi
- (Estonia) Anett Kontaveit
- (Sweden) Johanna Larsson
- (Russia) Evgeniya Rodina

=== Withdrawals ===
Before the tournament

- (Serbia) Jelena Janković → replaced by (France) Kristina Mladenovic
- (United States) Madison Keys → replaced by (Italy) Camila Giorgi
- (United Kingdom) Johanna Konta → replaced by (Estonia) Anett Kontaveit
- (Russia) Svetlana Kuznetsova → replaced by (Sweden) Johanna Larsson
- (Russia) Anastasia Pavlyuchenkova → replaced by (United States) Kayla Day
- (Czech Republic) Karolína Plíšková → replaced by (Belgium) Kirsten Flipkens
- (United States) Sloane Stephens → replaced by (France) Caroline Garcia
- (Czech Republic) Barbora Strýcová → replaced by (Russia) Evgeniya Rodina

=== Retirements ===
- (Estonia) Anett Kontaveit

== Doubles main-draw entrants ==
=== Seeds ===
Country	Player	Country	Player	Rank*	Seed
HUN	Tímea Babos	KAZ	Yaroslava Shvedova	16	1
IND	Sania Mirza	ROU	Monica Niculescu	17	2
SLO	Andreja Klepač	SLO	Katarina Srebotnik	57	3
ESP	Anabel Medina Garrigues	ESP	Arantxa Parra Santonja	68	4

- Rankings are as of 15 August 2016

=== Other entrants ===
The following pair received wildcards into the doubles main draw:

- (United States) Louisa Chirico / (United States) Alison Riske
- (Chinese Taipei) Hsieh Su-wei / (Germany) Andrea Petkovic
- (Poland) Klaudia Jans-Ignacik / (Denmark) Caroline Wozniacki

== Finals ==
=== Singles ===
- (Poland) Agnieszka Radwańska defeated (Ukraine) Elina Svitolina, 6–1, 7–6^{(7–3)}

=== Doubles ===
- (India) Sania Mirza / (Romania) Monica Niculescu defeated (Ukraine) Kateryna Bondarenko / (Chinese Taipei) Chuang Chia-jung, 7–5, 6–4
