= 2004 AP Tourism Hyderabad Open – Doubles =

Doubles
- 2004 AP Tourism Hyderabad Open

Final
- Champions: (South Africa) Liezel Huber (India) Sania Mirza
- Runners-up: (China) Li Ting (China) Sun Tiantian
- Score: 7–6^{(7–1)}, 6–4

Details
- Draw: 16
- Seeds: 4

Events
Singles	Doubles
← 2003 ·	WTA Indian Open	· 2005 →

Elena Likhovtseva and Iroda Tulyaganova were the defending champions, but chose not to participate that year. In the final, wildcards Liezel Huber and Sania Mirza defeated 3rd seeds Li Ting and Sun Tiantian 7–6^{(7–1)}, 6–4 to win their title.

== Seeds ==
1. (Australia) Nicole Pratt / (Thailand) Tamarine Tanasugarn (first round)
2. (Indonesia) Wynne Prakusya / (Indonesia) Angelique Widjaja (quarterfinals)
3. (China) Li Ting / (China) Sun Tiantian (final)
4. (China) Yan Zi / (China) Zheng Jie (semifinals)

== Draw ==
Key

- Q = Qualifier
- WC = Wild card
- LL = Lucky loser
- Alt = Alternate
- ITF = ITF entry
- PR = Protected ranking
- SR = Special ranking
- SE = Special exempt
- JE = Junior exempt
- JR = Junior Accelerator Programme entrant
- CO = College Accelerator Programme entrant
- NG = Next Gen Accelerator Program entrant
- w/o = Walkover
- r = Retired
- d = Defaulted

First round
1	(Australia) N Pratt (Thailand) T Tanasugarn	2	3
(Ukraine) Y Beygelzimer (Belarus) T Poutchek	6	6
(France) M Bartoli (Japan) S Obata	0^{r}
(Russia) M Kirilenko (Russia) E Kulikovskaya	0
3	(China) T Li (China) T Sun	3	7^{7}	6
(Austria) B Schwartz (Germany) J Wöhr	6	6^{4}	2
(Slovakia) Ľ Kurhajcová (Republic of Ireland) K Liggan	6	7
(Russia) G Fokina (Russia) A Rodionova	4	5
(Bosnia and Herzegovina) M Jugić-Salkić (Croatia) J Kostanić	6	6
(Italy) Ad Serra Zanetti (Italy) An Serra Zanetti	3	1
Q	(India) I Lakhani (Israel) S Pe'er	6	1	1
4	(China) Z Yan (China) J Zheng	3	6	6
LL	(South Korea) J-h Kim (New Zealand) S Stephens	2	6^{10}
WC	(South Africa) L Huber (India) S Mirza	6	7^{12}
(Croatia) D Jurak (Germany) A Matic	3	5
2	(Indonesia) W Prakusya (Indonesia) A Widjaja	6	7

Quarterfinals
(Ukraine) Y Beygelzimer (Belarus) T Poutchek	6	6
(Russia) M Kirilenko (Russia) E Kulikovskaya	4	4
3	(China) T Li (China) T Sun	w/o
(Slovakia) Ľ Kurhajcová (Republic of Ireland) K Liggan
(Bosnia and Herzegovina) M Jugić-Salkić (Croatia) J Kostanić	6^{7}	0
4	(China) Z Yan (China) J Zheng	7^{9}	6
WC	(South Africa) L Huber (India) S Mirza	6	6
2	(Indonesia) W Prakusya (Indonesia) A Widjaja	0	4

Semifinals
(Ukraine) Y Beygelzimer (Belarus) T Poutchek	3	2
3	(China) T Li (China) T Sun	6	6
4	(China) Z Yan (China) J Zheng	6^{3}	3
WC	(South Africa) L Huber (India) S Mirza	7^{7}	6

Final
3	(China) T Li (China) T Sun	6^{1}	4
WC	(South Africa) L Huber (India) S Mirza	7^{7}	6
