= 2016 Connecticut Open – Doubles =

Doubles
- 2016 Connecticut Open

Final
- Champions: (India) Sania Mirza (Romania) Monica Niculescu
- Runners-up: (Ukraine) Kateryna Bondarenko (Chinese Taipei) Chuang Chia-jung
- Score: 7–5, 6–4

Details
- Draw: 16
- Seeds: 4

Events
| Singles | Doubles |
| ← 2015 · | Connecticut Open | · 2017 → |

Julia Görges and Lucie Hradecká were the defending champions, but chose not to participate this year.

Sania Mirza and Monica Niculescu and won the title, defeating Kateryna Bondarenko and Chuang Chia-jung in the final, 7–5, 6–4

== Seeds ==
1. (Hungary) Tímea Babos / (Kazakhstan) Yaroslava Shvedova (semifinals)
2. (India) Sania Mirza / (Romania) Monica Niculescu (champions)
3. (Slovenia) Andreja Klepač / (Slovenia) Katarina Srebotnik (semifinals)
4. (Spain) Anabel Medina Garrigues / (Spain) Arantxa Parra Santonja (first round)

== Draw ==
=== Key ===
- Q = Qualifier
- WC = Wild card
- LL = Lucky loser
- Alt = Alternate
- SE = Special exempt
- PR = Protected ranking
- ITF = ITF entry
- JE = Junior exempt
- w/o = Walkover
- r = Retired
- d = Defaulted
- SR = Special ranking

First round
1 | (Hungary) T Babos (Kazakhstan) Y Shvedova | 3 | 6 | [10]
WC | (Poland) K Jans-Ignacik (Denmark) C Wozniacki | 6 | 4 | [8]
(Germany) A-L Grönefeld (Czech Republic) K Peschke | 6 | 6
(China) C Liang (Poland) A Rosolska | 2 | 3
4 | (Spain) A Medina Garrigues (Spain) A Parra Santonja | 0 | 1
(Ukraine) K Bondarenko (Chinese Taipei) C-j Chuang | 6 | 6
WC | (Chinese Taipei) S-w Hsieh (Germany) A Petkovic | 3 | 6 | [10]
(United States) N Melichar (United States) M Sanchez | 6 | 1 | [8]
(Canada) G Dabrowski (Spain) MJ Martínez Sánchez | 2 | 4
(Netherlands) K Bertens (Sweden) J Larsson | 6 | 6
(Argentina) M Irigoyen (Georgia (country)) O Kalashnikova | 0 | 4
3 | (Slovenia) A Klepač (Slovenia) K Srebotnik | 6 | 6
(Croatia) D Jurak (Australia) An Rodionova | 7 | 6
(Spain) L Arruabarrena (Switzerland) X Knoll | 5 | 4
WC | (United States) L Chirico (United States) A Riske | 0 | 3
2 | (India) S Mirza (Romania) M Niculescu | 6 | 6

Quarterfinals
1 | (Hungary) T Babos (Kazakhstan) Y Shvedova | 7^{7} | 6
(Germany) A-L Grönefeld (Czech Republic) K Peschke | 6^{3} | 2
(Ukraine) K Bondarenko (Chinese Taipei) C-j Chuang | 7 | 1 | [11]
WC | (Chinese Taipei) S-w Hsieh (Germany) A Petkovic | 5 | 6 | [9]
(Netherlands) K Bertens (Sweden) J Larsson | 5 | 6^{3}
3 | (Slovenia) A Klepač (Slovenia) K Srebotnik | 7 | 7^{7}
(Croatia) D Jurak (Australia) An Rodionova | 1 | 4
2 | (India) S Mirza (Romania) M Niculescu | 6 | 6

Semifinals
1 | (Hungary) T Babos (Kazakhstan) Y Shvedova | 3 | 7 | [7]
(Ukraine) K Bondarenko (Chinese Taipei) C-j Chuang | 6 | 5 | [10]
3 | (Slovenia) A Klepač (Slovenia) K Srebotnik | 6 | 3 | [8]
2 | (India) S Mirza (Romania) M Niculescu | 2 | 6 | [10]

Final
(Ukraine) K Bondarenko (Chinese Taipei) C-j Chuang | 5 | 4
2 | (India) S Mirza (Romania) M Niculescu | 7 | 6
