= 2004 AP Tourism Hyderabad Open =

- Date: 16–21 February
- Edition: 2nd
- Category: Tier IV
- Draw: 32S / 16D
- Prize money: $140,000
- Surface: Hard / outdoor
- Location: Hyderabad, India

Champions

Singles
- (Australia) Nicole Pratt

Doubles
- (South Africa) Liezel Huber / (India) Sania Mirza
← 2003 ·	WTA Indian Open	· 2005 →

The 2004 AP Tourism Hyderabad Open was a Tier IV women's professional tennis tournament on the 2004 WTA Tour. It was the second edition of the tournament and was held on outdoor hard courts in Hyderabad, India from 16 through 21 February 2004. Fourth-seeded Nicole Pratt won the singles title.

== Finals ==
=== Singles ===
(Australia) Nicole Pratt defeated (Russia) Maria Kirilenko, 7–6^{(7–3)}, 6–1

- It was Pratt's only singles title of her career.

=== Doubles ===
- (South Africa) Liezel Huber / (India) Sania Mirza defeated (China) Li Ting / (China) Sun Tiantian, 7–6^{(7–1)}, 6–4

== Entrants ==
=== Seeds ===
- The following players were seeded

Seed	Country	Player name
1	JPN	Saori Obata
2	FRA	Marion Bartoli
3	THA	Tamarine Tanasugarn
4	AUS	Nicole Pratt
5	CRO	Jelena Kostanić
6	CHN	Zheng Jie
7	ITA	Maria Elena Camerin
8	SVK	Lubomira Kurhajcova

=== Other entrants ===
The following players received Wildcards into the main draw

- (India) Isha Lakhani
- (India) Sania Mirza

The following players got entry from the Qualifying Draw

- (India) Ankita Bhambri
- (Israel) Shahar Pe'er
- (Austria) Barbara Schwartz
- (United States) Neha Uberoi
