= 2011 Citi Open =

- Date: July 25–31
- Edition: 1st
- Category: WTA International
- Surface: Hard / outdoor
- Location: Washington, D.C., United States
- Venue: College Park, Maryland

Champions

Singles
- (Russia) Nadia Petrova

Doubles
- (India) Sania Mirza / (Kazakhstan) Yaroslava Shvedova
- Washington Open

The 2011 Citi Open was a women's tennis tournament played on outdoor hard courts. It was the 1st edition of the Citi Open, and was a part of the WTA International tournaments of the 2011 WTA Tour. It took place at the College Park, Maryland in Washington, D.C., United States, from July 26 through July 31, 2011. Nadia Petrova won the singles title.

== Finals ==
=== Singles ===
(Russia) Nadia Petrova defeated (Israel) Shahar Pe'er, 7–5, 6–2.

- It was Petrova's 1st title of the year and 10th of her career.

=== Doubles ===
(India) Sania Mirza / (Kazakhstan) Yaroslava Shvedova defeated (Belarus) Olga Govortsova / (Russia) Alla Kudryavtseva, 6–3, 6–3

== WTA entrants ==
=== Seeds ===
Nation	Player	Ranking*	Seed
ISR	Shahar Pe'er	24	1
RUS	Nadia Petrova	32	2
AUT	Tamira Paszek	42	3
AUS	Jelena Dokić	53	4
SRB	Bojana Jovanovski	58	5
GBR	Elena Baltacha	60	6
IND	Sania Mirza	64	7
ITA	Alberta Brianti	68	8

- Seedings are based on the rankings of July 18, 2011.

=== Other entrants ===
The following players received wildcards into the singles main draw

- (Canada) Eugenie Bouchard
- (Japan) Misaki Doi
- (Russia) Nadia Petrova
- (United States) Sloane Stephens

The following players received entry from the qualifying draw:

- (United States) Madison Brengle
- (Japan) Ryōko Fuda
- (United States) Alexandra Mueller
- (Slovenia) Petra Rampre
