= 2011 Citi Open – Doubles =

Doubles
- 2011 Citi Open

Final
- Champions: (India) Sania Mirza (Kazakhstan) Yaroslava Shvedova
- Runners-up: (Belarus) Olga Govortsova (Russia) Alla Kudryavtseva
- Score: 6–3, 6–3

Events
Singles	Doubles
Citi Open	· 2012 →

Sania Mirza and Yaroslava Shvedova won the title, defeating Olga Govortsova and Alla Kudryavtseva 6–3, 6–3 in the final.

== Seeds ==
1. (India) Sania Mirza / (Kazakhstan) Yaroslava Shvedova (champions)
2. (Belarus) Olga Govortsova / (Russia) Alla Kudryavtseva (final)
3. (Italy) Alberta Brianti / (Greece) Eleni Daniilidou (semifinals)
4. (Israel) Shahar Pe'er / (United States) Sloane Stephens (semifinals)

== Draw ==
=== Key ===
- Q = Qualifier
- WC = Wild card
- LL = Lucky loser
- Alt = Alternate
- SE = Special exempt
- PR = Protected ranking
- ITF = ITF entry
- JE = Junior exempt
- w/o = Walkover
- r = Retired
- d = Defaulted
- SR = Special ranking

=== Draw ===
First round
1	(India) S Mirza (Kazakhstan) Y Shvedova	6	6
(United States) B Capra (United States) A Muhammed	1	2
(United States) L Lee-Waters (United States) M Moulton-Levy	6	7^{7}
(United States) M Brengle (Canada) G Dabrowski	2	6^{2}
4	(Israel) S Pe'er (United States) S Stephens	w/o
(United States) M Oudin (China) S Zhang
(Latvia) L Dekmeijere (United States) A Mueller	w/o
WC	(Australia) J Dokić (South Africa) C Scheepers
(United States) I Falconi (United States) A Riske	7^{7}	6
(United States) J Cohen (United States) W Jones	6^{3}	2
(United States) J Craybas (Hungary) M Czink
3	(Italy) A Brianti (Greece) E Daniilidou	w/o
(United Kingdom) A Keothavong (United Kingdom) H Watson	6	3	[10]
WC	(Canada) E Bouchard (Japan) M Doi	3	6	[8]
WC	(Germany) K Grajdek (Australia) T Patterson	4	6^{6}
2	(Belarus) O Govortsova (Russia) A Kudryavtseva	6	7^{8}

Quarterfinals
1	(India) S Mirza (Kazakhstan) Y Shvedova	6	6
(United States) L Lee-Waters (United States) M Moulton-Levy	3	4
4	(Israel) S Pe'er (United States) S Stephens	3	6	[11]
(Latvia) L Dekmeijere (United States) A Mueller	6	1	[9]
(United States) I Falconi (United States) A Riske	7	3	[5]
3	(Italy) A Brianti (Greece) E Daniilidou	5	6	[10]
(United Kingdom) A Keothavong (United Kingdom) H Watson	5	3
2	(Belarus) O Govortsova (Russia) A Kudryavtseva	7	6

Semifinals
1	(India) S Mirza (Kazakhstan) Y Shvedova	6	6
4	(Israel) S Pe'er (United States) S Stephens	0	1
3	(Italy) A Brianti (Greece) E Daniilidou	5	0
2	(Belarus) O Govortsova (Russia) A Kudryavtseva	7	6

Final
1	(India) S Mirza (Kazakhstan) Y Shvedova	6	6
2	(Belarus) O Govortsova (Russia) A Kudryavtseva	3	3
