= 2005 AP Tourism Hyderabad Open – Singles =

Singles
- 2005 AP Tourism Hyderabad Open

Final
- Champion: (India) Sania Mirza
- Runner-up: (Ukraine) Alona Bondarenko
- Score: 6–4, 5–7, 6–3

Details
- Draw: 32
- Seeds: 8

Events
Singles	Doubles
← 2004 ·	AP Tourism Hyderabad Open	· 2006 →

Nicole Pratt was the defending champion, but decided not to participate that year.

Sania Mirza won in the final, defeating Alona Bondarenko 6–4, 5–7, 6–3 to become the first ever Indian woman to win a WTA singles title.

== Seeds ==
1. (China) Li Na (quarterfinals)
2. (Germany) Anna-Lena Grönefeld (semifinals, withdrew because of a right knee strain)
3. (Russia) Tatiana Panova (first round)
4. (China) Zheng Jie (second round)
5. (Poland) Marta Domachowska (withdrew due to a right shoulder strain)
6. (Thailand) Tamarine Tanasugarn (second round)
7. (Slovakia) Ľubomíra Kurhajcová (first round)
8. (Russia) Maria Kirilenko (semifinals)
9. (Ukraine) Alona Bondarenko (final)

== Draw ==
Key

- Q = Qualifier
- WC = Wild card
- LL = Lucky loser
- Alt = Alternate
- ITF = ITF entry
- PR = Protected ranking
- SR = Special ranking
- SE = Special exempt
- JE = Junior exempt
- JR = Junior Accelerator Programme entrant
- CO = College Accelerator Programme entrant
- NG = Next Gen Accelerator Program entrant
- w/o = Walkover
- r = Retired
- d = Defaulted

=== Finals ===
Semifinals
8	(Russia) Maria Kirilenko	4	6^{4}
WC	(India) Sania Mirza	6	7^{7}
9	(Ukraine) Alona Bondarenko	w/o
2	(Germany) Anna-Lena Grönefeld

Final
WC	(India) Sania Mirza	6	5	6
9	(Ukraine) Alona Bondarenko	4	7	3

=== Top half ===
First round
1	(China) N Li	6	6
(Switzerland) M-G Mikaelian	3	3
(Italy) R Vinci	3	1
(Argentina) ME Salerni	6	6
(Italy) M Santangelo	7^{7}	6
(Serbia and Montenegro) J Dokić	6^{2}	3
LL	(Belarus) T Poutchek	3	1
8	(Russia) M Kirilenko	6	6
4	(China) J Zheng	6	6
(Russia) G Voskoboeva	4	2
(Romania) D Sescioreanu	2	5
WC	(India) S Mirza	6	7
(Australia) E Dominikovic	6	6
LL	(Japan) S Hisamatsu	0	3
(Israel) T Obziler	6	6
7	(Slovakia) Ľ Kurhajcová	2	2

Second round
1	(China) N Li	6	7
(Argentina) ME Salerni	2	5
(Italy) M Santangelo	6	3	6^{4}
8	(Russia) M Kirilenko	3	6	7^{7}
4	(China) J Zheng	1	6	3
WC	(India) S Mirza	6	2	6
(Australia) E Dominikovic	3	2
(Israel) T Obziler	6	6

Quarterfinals
1	(China) N Li	4	3
8	(Russia) M Kirilenko	6	6
WC	(India) S Mirza	4	6	7^{7}
(Israel) T Obziler	6	3	6^{5}

Semifinals
8	(Russia) M Kirilenko	4	6^{4}
WC	(India) S Mirza	6	7^{7}

=== Bottom half ===
First round
9	(Ukraine) A Bondarenko	6	6
WC	(India) A Bhambri	3	2
(Hungary) M Czink	6^{5}	6	6
(India) S Uberoi	7^{7}	3	2
(Canada) M-È Pelletier	2	7	7
(Russia) E Bychkova	6	5	5
WC	(Israel) S Pe'er	6	7^{7}
3	(Russia) T Panova	4	6^{2}
6	(Thailand) T Tanasugarn	6	4	6
Q	(Uzbekistan) A Amanmuradova	4	6	1
(China) T Sun	6	6
(Czech Republic) L Němečková	2	4
Q	(Slovakia) J Gajdošová	6	6
Q	(China) T Li	3	2
Q	(Luxembourg) M Minella	3	4
2	(Germany) A-L Grönefeld	6	6

Second round
9	(Ukraine) A Bondarenko	6	6^{2}	6
(Hungary) M Czink	3	7^{7}	4
(Canada) M-È Pelletier	6	6
WC	(Israel) S Pe'er	4	3
6	(Thailand) T Tanasugarn	2	1
(China) T Sun	6	6
Q	(Slovakia) J Gajdošová	3	4
2	(Germany) A-L Grönefeld	6	6

Quarterfinals
9	(Ukraine) A Bondarenko	7^{7}	6
(Canada) M-È Pelletier	6^{5}	4
(China) T Sun	6^{5}	3
2	(Germany) A-L Grönefeld	7^{7}	6

Semifinals
9	(Ukraine) A Bondarenko	w/o
2	(Germany) A-L Grönefeld
