= 2007 Sony Ericsson International =

- Date: 12–18 February
- Edition: 5th
- Category: Tier III
- Draw: 32S / 16D
- Prize money: $175,000
- Surface: Hard / outdoor
- Location: Bangalore, India

Champions

Singles
- (Russia) Yaroslava Shvedova

Doubles
- (Chinese Taipei) Chan Yung-jan / (Chinese Taipei) Chuang Chia-jung
← 2006 ·	WTA Indian Open	· 2008 →

The 2007 Sony Ericsson International was a WTA women's tennis tournament held in Bangalore, India from 12 February to 18 February 2007 that was part of the Tier III category of the 2007 WTA Tour. It was the fifth edition of the tournament and was played on outdoor hard courts. Unseeded Yaroslava Shvedova won the singles title.

== Finals ==
=== Singles ===
(Russia) Yaroslava Shvedova defeated (Italy) Mara Santangelo 6–4, 6-4

- It was Shvedova's only WTA singles title of her career.

=== Doubles ===
(Chinese Taipei) Chan Yung-jan / (Chinese Taipei) Chuang Chia-jung defeated (Chinese Taipei) Hsieh Su-wei / (Russia) Alla Kudryavtseva 6–7^{(4–7)}, 6–2, [11-9]

- It was Chan's 1st doubles title of the year and the 2nd of her career. It was Chuan's 1st doubles title of the year and the 2nd of her career.

== WTA entrants ==
=== Seeds ===
Country	Player	Seed
ITA	Mara Santangelo	1
IND	Sania Mirza	2
RUS	Vasilisa Bardina	3
CRO	Jelena Kostanić Tošić	4
UKR	Yuliana Fedak	5
TPE	Chan Yung-jan	6
THA	Tamarine Tanasugarn	7
ITA	Alberta Brianti	8

=== Other entrants ===
The following players received wildcards into the singles main draw:

- (Australia) Sophie Ferguson
- (India) Tara Iyer
- (India) Shikha Uberoi

The following players received entry from the qualifying draw:

- (Chinese Taipei) Chan Chin-wei
- (Thailand) Nudnida Luangnam
- (Japan) Yurika Sema
- (China) Sun Shengnan
