= 2008 Canara Bank Bangalore Open =

- Date: 3–9 March
- Edition: 6th
- Category: Tier II
- Draw: 28S / 16D
- Prize money: $600,000
- Surface: Hard / outdoor
- Location: Bangalore, India
- Venue: KST Signature Kingfisher Tennis stadium

Champions

Singles
- (United States) Serena Williams

Doubles
- (China) Peng Shuai / (China) Sun Tiantian
← 2007 ·	WTA Indian Open	· 2022 →

The 2008 Canara Bank Bangalore Open was the biggest Women's WTA Tennis Tournament of South and South-East Asia in 2008. It took place from 3 March to 9 March in the KST Signature Kingfisher Tennis stadium in the Indian city of Bangalore on outdoor hardcourts. 2008 was the sixth edition of the tournament, and the third held in Bangalore. The tournament had been upgraded to Tier II from a Tier III event and would offer a total prize money pot of US$600,000 up from $175,000 last year.

The field was led by Jelena Janković and formers world No. 1, Venus Williams and Serena Williams. Patty Schnyder, Ágnes Szávay, Sybille Bammer and Vera Zvonareva were also present.

Sania Mirza, the top Indian woman tennis player decided to skip her home event, citing the number of controversies that ensue every time she plays at home. According to Mirza: "Every time I play in India, there has been a problem. So [me and my manager] just thought it was better not to play this time."

Third-seeded Serena Williams won the singles title.

== Finals ==
=== Singles ===
(United States) Serena Williams defeated (Switzerland) Patty Schnyder, 7–5, 6–3

- It was Williams' first singles title of the year and 29th of her career.

=== Doubles ===
(China) Peng Shuai / (China) Sun Tiantian defeated (Chinese Taipei) Chan Yung-jan / (Chinese Taipei) Chuang Chia-jung, 6–4, 5–7, 10–8

== WTA entrants ==
=== Seeds ===
Country	Player	Rank ^{1}	Seed
SRB	Jelena Janković	4	1
USA	Venus Williams	8	2
USA	Serena Williams	10	3
SUI	Patty Schnyder	12	4
HUN	Ágnes Szávay	17	5
AUT	Sybille Bammer	20	6
RUS	Vera Zvonareva	21	7
RUS	Maria Kirilenko	27	8

- ^{1} Rankings are as of 25 February 2008

=== Other entrants ===
The following players received wild cards into the main singles draw:

- (India) Isha Lakhani
- (India) Shikha Uberoi

The following player used protected ranking to gain entry into the singles main draw:

- (Croatia) Sanda Mamić

The following players received entry from the singles qualifying draw:

- (Germany) Angelika Bachmann
- (Romania) Monica Niculescu
- (China) Sun Tiantian
- (Romania) Ágnes Szatmári
