= 2008 Canara Bank Bangalore Open – Singles =

Singles
- 2008 Canara Bank Bangalore Open

Final
- Champion: (United States) Serena Williams
- Runner-up: (Switzerland) Patty Schnyder
- Score: 7–5, 6–3

Details
- Draw: 28
- Seeds: 8

Events
Singles	Doubles
← 2007 ·	WTA Indian Open	· 2022 →

Yaroslava Shvedova was the defending champion, but lost in the first round to Akgul Amanmuradova.

Serena Williams defeated Patty Schnyder in straight sets to win the title, despite being match point down in her semifinal match against her sister Venus Williams.

== Singles results ==
=== Seeds ===
1. (Serbia) Jelena Janković (quarterfinals)
2. (United States) Venus Williams (semifinals)
3. (United States) Serena Williams (champion)
4. (Switzerland) Patty Schnyder (final)
5. (Hungary) Ágnes Szávay (second round)
6. (Austria) Sybille Bammer (second round)
7. (Russia) Vera Zvonareva (quarterfinals)
8. (Russia) Maria Kirilenko (first round)

Key

- Q = Qualifier
- WC = Wild card
- LL = Lucky loser
- Alt = Alternate
- ITF = ITF entry
- PR = Protected ranking
- SR = Special ranking
- SE = Special exempt
- JE = Junior exempt
- JR = Junior Accelerator Programme entrant
- CO = College Accelerator Programme entrant
- NG = Next Gen Accelerator Program entrant
- w/o = Walkover
- r = Retired
- d = Defaulted

=== Finals ===
Semifinals
(China) Yan Zi	3	4
4	(Switzerland) Patty Schnyder	6	6
3	(United States) Serena Williams	6	3	7^{7}
2	(United States) Venus Williams	3	6	6^{4}

Final
4	(Switzerland) Patty Schnyder	5	3
3	(United States) Serena Williams	7	6

=== Top half ===
First round
(Chinese Taipei) Y-j Chan	2	2
PR	(Croatia) S Mamić	6	6
(United Kingdom) K O'Brien	4	6	5
(Ukraine) O Savchuk	6	2	7
(China) Z Yan	3	7	6
8	(Russia) M Kirilenko	6	6^{7}	1
(Japan) A Nakamura	6^{5}	6	6
(Thailand) T Tanasugarn	7	1	2
(Uzbekistan) A Amanmuradova	6	3	6
(Russia) Y Shvedova	3	6	3
WC	(India) S Uberoi	1	4
5	(Hungary) Á Szávay	6	6

Second round
1	(Serbia) J Janković	6	6
PR	(Croatia) S Mamić	2	2
(Ukraine) O Savchuk	2	1
(China) Z Yan	6	6
4	(Switzerland) P Schnyder	6^{1}	6	6
(Japan) A Nakamura	7	4	2
(Uzbekistan) A Amanmuradova	4	7	6
5	(Hungary) Á Szávay	6	6^{4}	4

Quarter-Finals
1	(Serbia) J Janković	3	6	3
(China) Z Yan	6	3	6
4	(Switzerland) P Schnyder	4	6	7
(Uzbekistan) A Amanmuradova	6	4	6^{1}

Semi-Finals
(China) Z Yan	3	4
4	(Switzerland) P Schnyder	6	6

=== Bottom half ===
First round
6	(Austria) S Bammer	2	6	7
(Japan) A Morigami	6	3	5
(Russia) A Rodionova	4	7	6
Q	(China) T Sun	6	6^{2}	4
Q	(Germany) A Bachmann	2	3
(Israel) T Obziler	6	6
7	(Russia) V Zvonareva	4	6	6
Q	(Romania) M Niculescu	6	3	1
WC	(India) I Lakhani	2	2
Q	(Romania) Á Szatmári	6	6
(Luxembourg) A Kremer	1	2
(China) S Peng	6	6

Second round
6	(Austria) S Bammer	6^{5}	2
(Russia) A Rodionova	7	6
(Israel) T Obziler	5	0
3	(United States) S Williams	7	6
7	(Russia) V Zvonareva	7	6
Q	(Romania) Á Szatmári	6^{5}	1
(China) S Peng	2	7	2
2	(United States) V Williams	6	6^{6}	6

Quarter-Finals
(Russia) A Rodionova	1	4
3	(United States) S Williams	6	6
7	(Russia) V Zvonareva	4	3
2	(United States) V Williams	6	6

Semi-Finals
3	(United States) S Williams	6	3	7
2	(United States) V Williams	3	6	6^{4}

== Qualifying ==
=== Seeds ===
1. (Japan) Ayumi Morita (first round)
2. (United Kingdom) Katie O'Brien (moved to main draw)
3. (Romania) Monica Niculescu (qualified)
4. (Slovenia) Andreja Klepač (first round)
5. (France) Mathilde Johansson (qualifying competition)
6. (Switzerland) Emmanuelle Gagliardi (first round)
7. (United Kingdom) Anne Keothavong (qualifying competition)
8. (Russia) Vesna Manasieva (first round)
9. (Germany) Angelika Bachmann (qualified)

=== Qualifiers ===
1. (Romania) Ágnes Szatmári
2. (Germany) Angelika Bachmann
3. (Romania) Monica Niculescu
4. (China) Sun Tiantian

=== Draw ===
==== First qualifier ====
First round
1	(Japan) Ayumi Morita	6	0	0
(United Kingdom) Melanie South	4	6	6
(Belarus) Ekaterina Dzehalevich	6	6
(Romania) Magda Mihalache	1	4
WC	(France) Aurélie Védy	6	3	1
(Ukraine) Kristina Antoniychuk	3	6	6
(Romania) Ágnes Szatmári	6	3	6
6/WC	(Switzerland) Emmanuelle Gagliardi	1	6	4

Second round
(United Kingdom) Melanie South	6^{8}	6	6
(Belarus) Ekaterina Dzehalevich	7	2	3
(Ukraine) Kristina Antoniychuk	3	4
(Romania) Ágnes Szatmári	6	6

Qualifying competition
(United Kingdom) Melanie South	4	6	6^{6}
(Romania) Ágnes Szatmári	6	2	7

==== Second qualifier ====
First round
9	(Germany) Angelika Bachmann	6	3	6
(Uzbekistan) Iroda Tulyaganova	4	6	1
(United States) Alexandra Stevenson	7	6
(China) Sun Shengnan	5	3
WC	(India) Sanaa Bhambri	3	7	1
(Australia) Monique Adamczak	6	6^{4}	6
(Chinese Taipei) Hwang I-hsuan	5	1
5	(France) Mathilde Johansson	7	6

Second round
9	(Germany) Angelika Bachmann	6	6
(United States) Alexandra Stevenson	3	4
(Australia) Monique Adamczak	3	6^{9}
5	(France) Mathilde Johansson	6	7

Qualifying competition
9	(Germany) Angelika Bachmann	6	7
5	(France) Mathilde Johansson	3	5

==== Third qualifier ====
First round
3	(Romania) Monica Niculescu	6	6
(United States) Neha Uberoi	4	2
PR	(China) Zheng Jie	3	2^{r}
(Belgium) Debbrich Feys	6	3
(Germany) Kathrin Wörle	6	6
WC	(India) Ankita Bhambri	2	1
(South Africa) Chanelle Scheepers	2	4
7	(United Kingdom) Anne Keothavong	6	6

Second round
3	(Romania) Monica Niculescu	7	6
(Belgium) Debbrich Feys	6^{3}	1
(Germany) Kathrin Wörle	6	4	4
7	(United Kingdom) Anne Keothavong	0	6	6

Qualifying competition
3	(Romania) Monica Niculescu	6	6
7	(United Kingdom) Anne Keothavong	2	0

==== Fourth qualifier ====
First round
4	(Slovenia) Andreja Klepač	6	4	6^{5}
(Italy) Corinna Dentoni	4	6	7
Alt	(India) Akshitha Basavaraju	1	0
(China) Sun Tiantian	6	6
(India) Rushmi Chakravarthi	2	2
(Japan) Junri Namigata	6	6
(United States) Sunitha Rao	6	2	7
8	(Russia) Vesna Manasieva	4	6	5

Second round
(Italy) Corinna Dentoni	6	5	2
(China) Sun Tiantian	3	7	6
(Japan) Junri Namigata	2	6	2
(United States) Sunitha Rao	6	4	6

Qualifying competition
(China) Sun Tiantian	6	6
(United States) Sunitha Rao	2	1
