= 2006 Sony Ericsson Bangalore Open – Singles =

Singles
- 2006 Sony Ericsson Bangalore Open

Final
- Champion: (Italy) Mara Santangelo
- Runner-up: (Croatia) Jelena Kostanić
- Score: 3–6, 7–6^{(7–5)}, 6–3

Details
- Draw: 32
- Seeds: 8

Events
Singles	Doubles
← 2005 ·	WTA Indian Open	· 2007 →

Sania Mirza was the defending champion and top seed, but was stunned by Camille Pin in the second round.

In the final, Mara Santangelo defeated the Jelena Kostanić to win her title 3–6, 7–6^{(7–5)}, 6–3.

== Seeds ==
1. (India) Sania Mirza (second round)
2. (Israel) Shahar Pe'er (first round)
3. (Italy) Mara Santangelo (champion)
4. (Austria) Sybille Bammer (first round)
5. (Japan) Aiko Nakamura (first round)
6. (Croatia) Jelena Kostanić (final)
7. (Russia) Elena Vesnina (first round)
8. (Finland) Emma Laine (first round, retired)

== Draw ==
Key

- Q = Qualifier
- WC = Wild card
- LL = Lucky loser
- Alt = Alternate
- ITF = ITF entry
- PR = Protected ranking
- SR = Special ranking
- SE = Special exempt
- JE = Junior exempt
- JR = Junior Accelerator Programme entrant
- CO = College Accelerator Programme entrant
- NG = Next Gen Accelerator Program entrant
- w/o = Walkover
- r = Retired
- d = Defaulted

=== Finals ===
Semifinals
(United States) Vania King	0^{r}
3	(Italy) Mara Santangelo	5
(Hungary) Melinda Czink	0	6^{2}
6	(Croatia) Jelena Kostanić	6	7^{7}

Final
3	(Italy) Mara Santangelo	3	7^{7}	6
6	(Croatia) Jelena Kostanić	6	6^{5}	3

=== Top half ===
First round
1	(India) S Mirza	6	6
(Germany) M Müller	2	2
(France) C Pin	6	6
(Indonesia) A Widjaja	4	0
Q	(Belarus) T Poutchek	1	3
(United States) V King	6	6
(Australia) N Pratt	6	6
7	(Russia) E Vesnina	3	4
3	(Italy) M Santangelo	6	6
(Slovakia) H Nagyová	3	2
(Chinese Taipei) S-w Hsieh	3	4
(Israel) T Obziler	6	6
WC	(India) I Lakhani	4
Q	(Slovakia) K Kachlíková	1^{r}
(Ukraine) Y Fedak	6	2
8	(Finland) E Laine	3	1^{r}

Second round
1	(India) S Mirza	6	5	2
(France) C Pin	1	7	6
(United States) V King	6	6
(Australia) N Pratt	0	1
3	(Italy) M Santangelo	5	6	6
(Israel) T Obziler	7	4	3
WC	(India) I Lakhani	3	3
(Ukraine) Y Fedak	6	6

Quarterfinals
(France) C Pin	2	6^{7}
(United States) V King	6	7^{9}
3	(Italy) M Santangelo	6	6
(Ukraine) Y Fedak	4	3

Semifinals
(United States) V King	0^{r}
3	(Italy) M Santangelo	5

=== Bottom half ===
First round
5	(Japan) A Nakamura	6	3	3
(Ukraine) M Koryttseva	0	6	6
WC	(India) R Chakravarthi	1	2
(Hungary) M Czink	6	6
(Ukraine) A Bondarenko	6	7
(Ukraine) K Bondarenko	4	5
(Russia) A Rodionova	6	5	6
4	(Austria) S Bammer	4	7	0
6	(Croatia) J Kostanić	6	3	6
Q	(Austria) D Kix	2	6	3
(Estonia) K Kanepi	7	6
WC	(India) A Bhambri	5	3
Q	(Russia) A Kudryavtseva	4	6	7
(Thailand) T Tanasugarn	6	3	5
(Italy) ME Camerin	6	6
2	(Israel) S Pe'er	4	2

Second round
(Ukraine) M Koryttseva	2	2
(Hungary) M Czink	6	6
(Ukraine) A Bondarenko	6	6
(Russia) A Rodionova	2	1
6	(Croatia) J Kostanić	6	6
(Estonia) K Kanepi	1	4
Q	(Russia) A Kudryavtseva	1	5
(Italy) ME Camerin	6	7

Quarterfinals
(Hungary) M Czink	6	6^{4}	7^{8}
(Ukraine) A Bondarenko	2	7^{7}	6^{6}
6	(Croatia) J Kostanić	4
(Italy) ME Camerin	2^{r}

Semifinals
(Hungary) M Czink	0	6^{2}
6	(Croatia) J Kostanić	6	7^{7}
