= 2022 Chennai Open =

- Date: 12–18 September
- Edition: 7th (1st as Chennai Open)
- Category: WTA 250
- Draw: 32S / 16D
- Prize money: $251,750
- Surface: Hard / outdoor
- Location: Chennai, India
- Venue: SDAT Tennis Stadium, Nungambakkam

Champions

Singles
- (Czech Republic) Linda Fruhvirtová

Doubles
- (Canada) Gabriela Dabrowski / (Brazil) Luisa Stefani
- WTA Indian Open

The 2022 Chennai Open was a professional women's tennis tournament played on outdoor hard courts. A part of the 2022 WTA Tour, this tournament marked the return of a WTA tournament in India for the first time since 2008.

The event was one of the six tournaments that were given single-year WTA 250 licenses in September and October 2022 due to the cancellation of tournaments in China during the 2022 season because of the ongoing COVID-19 pandemic.

== Finals ==
=== Singles ===
(Czech Republic) Linda Fruhvirtová defeated (Poland) Magda Linette, 4–6, 6–3, 6–4

- It was Fruhvirtová's first WTA Tour singles title.

=== Doubles ===
(Canada) Gabriela Dabrowski / (Brazil) Luisa Stefani defeated Anna Blinkova / (Georgia (country)) Natela Dzalamidze, 6–1, 6–2

== Points and prize money ==
=== Point distribution ===
Event	W	F	SF	QF	Round of 16	Round of 32	Q	Q2	Q1
Singles	280	180	110	60	30	1	18	12	1
Doubles	280	180	110	60	1	—N/a	—N/a	—N/a	—N/a

=== Prize money ===
Event	W	F	SF	QF	Round of 16	Round of 32^{1}	Q2	Q1
Singles	$31,000	$18,037	$10,100	$5,800	$3,675	$2,675	$1,950	$1,270
Doubles*	$10,800	$6,300	$3,800	$2,300	$1,750	—N/a	—N/a	—N/a

_{^{1}Qualifiers prize money is also the Round of 32 prize money.}
_{*per team}

== Singles main-draw entrants ==
=== Seeds ===
Country	Player	Rank^{†}	Seed
USA	Alison Riske-Amritraj	29	1
	Varvara Gracheva	72	2
POL	Magda Linette	73	3
GER	Tatjana Maria	85	4
SWE	Rebecca Peterson	92	5
CHN	Wang Qiang	102	6
CAN	Rebecca Marino	106	7
FRA	Chloé Paquet	111	8

^{†} Rankings are as of 29 August 2022.

=== Other entrants ===
The following players received wildcards into the main draw:

- (Canada) Eugenie Bouchard
- (India) Ankita Raina
- (India) Karman Thandi

The following player received entry into the singles main draw with a special ranking:

- (Belgium) Yanina Wickmayer

The following players received entry from the qualifying draw:

- (Croatia) Jana Fett
- (Japan) Nao Hibino
- (Chinese Taipei) Liang En-shuo
- (Japan) Kyōka Okamura
- (Australia) Olivia Tjandramulia
- Mariia Tkacheva

=== Withdrawals ===
Before the tournament

- (France) Caroline Garcia → replaced by (Greece) Despina Papamichail
- (Belgium) Elise Mertens → replaced by (Argentina) Nadia Podoroska

== Doubles main-draw entrants ==
=== Seeds ===
Country	Player	Country	Player	Rank^{1}	Seed
CAN	Gabriela Dabrowski	BRA	Luisa Stefani	105	1
USA	Kaitlyn Christian		Lidziya Marozava	126	2
GEO	Oksana Kalashnikova	UKR	Nadiia Kichenok	153	3
CHN	Han Xinyun	POL	Katarzyna Kawa	155	4

- ^{1} Rankings as of 29 August 2022.

=== Other entrants ===
The following pair received a wildcard into the doubles main draw:

- (India) Sharmada Balu / (India) Riya Bhatia
- (Canada) Eugenie Bouchard / (Belgium) Yanina Wickmayer

=== Withdrawals ===
Before the tournament

- (Andorra) Victoria Jiménez Kasintseva / (Argentina) Nadia Podoroska → replaced by (India) Rutuja Bhosale / (India) Karman Thandi
- (Japan) Miyu Kato / (United States) Asia Muhammad → replaced by (Lithuania) Justina Mikulskytė / (United Kingdom) Emily Webley-Smith
- (Germany) Julia Lohoff / (Australia) Astra Sharma → replaced by (Australia) Astra Sharma / Ekaterina Yashina
