= 2007 Sony Ericsson International – Doubles =

Doubles
- 2007 Sony Ericsson International

Final
- Champion: (Chinese Taipei) Chan Yung-jan (Chinese Taipei) Chuang Chia-jung
- Runner-up: (Chinese Taipei) Hsieh Su-wei (Russia) Alla Kudryavtseva
- Score: 6–7^{(4–7)}, 6–2, [11–9]

Details
- Draw: 16
- Seeds: 4

Events
Singles	Doubles
← 2006 ·	WTA Indian Open	· 2008 →

Sania Mirza and Liezel Huber were the defending champions, but Huber chose not to participate this year.

Mirza played alongside Mara Santangelo, but they lost in the semifinals Hsieh Su-wei and Alla Kudryavtseva.

In the final, Chan Yung-jan and Chuang Chia-jung defeated Hsieh and Kudryavtseva to win their title 6–7^{(4–7)}, 6–2, [11–9].

== Seeds ==
1. (Chinese Taipei) Chan Yung-jan
  (Chinese Taipei) Chuang Chia-jung (champions)
2. (India) Sania Mirza
  (Italy) Mara Santangelo (semifinals)
3. (Ukraine) Yuliya Beygelzimer
  (Ukraine) Yuliana Fedak (quarterfinals)
4. (Chinese Taipei) Hsieh Su-wei
  (Russia) Alla Kudryavtseva (final)

== Draw ==
Key

- Q = Qualifier
- WC = Wild card
- LL = Lucky loser
- Alt = Alternate
- ITF = ITF entry
- PR = Protected ranking
- SR = Special ranking
- SE = Special exempt
- JE = Junior exempt
- JR = Junior Accelerator Programme entrant
- CO = College Accelerator Programme entrant
- NG = Next Gen Accelerator Program entrant
- w/o = Walkover
- r = Retired
- d = Defaulted

=== Draw ===
First round
1	(Chinese Taipei) Y-j Chan (Chinese Taipei) C-j Chuang	6	6
(Hungary) M Czink (Slovenia) A Klepač	3	3
(Italy) A Brianti (Ukraine) M Koryttseva	7	6
(United States) S Rao (Ukraine) O Savchuk	5	4
3	(Ukraine) Y Beygelzimer (Ukraine) Y Fedak	7^{9}	6
(China) Y Chen (China) S Zhang	6^{7}	3
(Australia) S Ferguson (Australia) A Molik	6	2	[5]
(Slovakia) J Gajdošová (Australia) C Horiatopoulous	3	6	[10]
(China) C Ji (China) S Sun	6	2	[10]
(Germany) K Barrois (Germany) S Klösel	3	6	[4]
(Chinese Taipei) C-w Chan (China) M Yuan	4	0
4	(Chinese Taipei) S-w Hsieh (Russia) A Kudryavtseva	6	6
(United States) N Uberoi (India) S Uberoi	6	6
WC	(India) I Lakhani (India) S Nagaraj	4	0
(Uzbekistan) A Amanmuradova (Belarus) T Poutchek	2	6^{4}
2	(India) S Mirza (Italy) M Santangelo	6	7^{7}

Quarterfinals
1	(Chinese Taipei) Y-j Chan (Chinese Taipei) C-j Chuang	6	4	[10]
(Italy) A Brianti (Ukraine) M Koryttseva	2	6	[8]
3	(Ukraine) Y Beygelzimer (Ukraine) Y Fedak	3	3
(Slovakia) J Gajdošová (Australia) C Horiatopoulous	6	6
(China) C Ji (China) S Sun	6^{4}	4
4	(Chinese Taipei) S-w Hsieh (Russia) A Kudryavtseva	7^{7}	6
(United States) N Uberoi (India) S Uberoi	3	1
2	(India) S Mirza (Italy) M Santangelo	6	6

Semifinals
1	(Chinese Taipei) Y-j Chan (Chinese Taipei) C-j Chuang	6	6
(Slovakia) J Gajdošová (Australia) C Horiatopoulous	3	2
4	(Chinese Taipei) S-w Hsieh (Russia) A Kudryavtseva	6	3	[10]
2	(India) S Mirza (Italy) M Santangelo	4	6	[5]

Finals
1	(Chinese Taipei) Y-j Chan (Chinese Taipei) C-j Chuang	6^{4}	6	[11]
4	(Chinese Taipei) S-w Hsieh (Russia) A Kudryavtseva	7^{7}	2	[9]
