= 2006 Sony Ericsson Bangalore Open – Doubles =

Doubles
- 2006 Sony Ericsson Bangalore Open

Final
- Champions: (South Africa) Liezel Huber (India) Sania Mirza
- Runners-up: (Russia) Anastasia Rodionova (Russia) Elena Vesnina
- Score: 6–3, 6–3

Details
- Draw: 16
- Seeds: 4

Events
Singles	Doubles
← 2005 ·	WTA Indian Open	· 2007 →

Yan Zi and Zheng Jie were the defending champions, but chose not to participate that year.

In the final, Liezel Huber and Sania Mirza defeated Anastasia Rodionova and Elena Vesnina 6–3, 6–3 to win their title.

== Seeds ==
1. (Australia) Nicole Pratt / (Italy) Mara Santangelo (first round)
2. (South Africa) Liezel Huber / (India) Sania Mirza (champions)
3. (Ukraine) Mariya Koryttseva / (Israel) Shahar Pe'er (semifinals)
4. (Russia) Anastasia Rodionova / (Russia) Elena Vesnina (final)

== Draw ==
Key

- Q = Qualifier
- WC = Wild card
- LL = Lucky loser
- Alt = Alternate
- ITF = ITF entry
- PR = Protected ranking
- SR = Special ranking
- SE = Special exempt
- JE = Junior exempt
- JR = Junior Accelerator Programme entrant
- CO = College Accelerator Programme entrant
- NG = Next Gen Accelerator Program entrant
- w/o = Walkover
- r = Retired
- d = Defaulted

First round
1	(Australia) N Pratt (Italy) M Santangelo	4	5
Q	(Hungary) M Czink (United States) V King	6	7
(Croatia) I Abramović (Croatia) M Abramović	6	6
(Japan) R Fuda (Japan) S Okamoto	4	3
(Ukraine) Y Fedak (Belarus) T Poutchek	3	4
4	(Russia) A Rodionova (Russia) E Vesnina	6	6
(Czech Republic) E Hrdinová (Japan) A Nakamura	6	1	1
(Ukraine) A Bondarenko (Ukraine) K Bondarenko	4	6	6
(Uzbekistan) A Amanmuradova (Russia) J Vorobieva	6^{7}	7	2
(Chinese Taipei) S-w Hsieh (Thailand) T Tanasugarn	7^{9}	5	6
3	(Ukraine) M Koryttseva (Israel) S Pe'er	6	6
(Belarus) E Dzehalevich (Hungary) K Nagy	4	2
WC	(India) A Bhambri (India) R Chakravarthi	2	2
(Germany) M Müller (Croatia) S Talaja	6	6
(Israel) T Obziler (Indonesia) A Widjaja	4	4
2	(South Africa) L Huber (India) S Mirza	6	6

Quarterfinals
Q	(Hungary) M Czink (United States) V King	4	6	6
(Croatia) I Abramović (Croatia) M Abramović	6	3	2
4	(Russia) A Rodionova (Russia) E Vesnina	7	6
(Ukraine) A Bondarenko (Ukraine) K Bondarenko	5	3
(Chinese Taipei) S-w Hsieh (Thailand) T Tanasugarn	3	1
3	(Ukraine) M Koryttseva (Israel) S Pe'er	6	6
(Germany) M Müller (Croatia) S Talaja	6^{8}	6	4
2	(South Africa) L Huber (India) S Mirza	7^{10}	2	6

Semifinals
Q	(Hungary) M Czink (United States) V King	5	r
4	(Russia) A Rodionova (Russia) E Vesnina	7
3	(Ukraine) M Koryttseva (Israel) S Pe'er	5	7^{8}	4
2	(South Africa) L Huber (India) S Mirza	7	6^{6}	6

Final
4	(Russia) A Rodionova (Russia) E Vesnina	3	3
2	(South Africa) L Huber (India) S Mirza	6	6
