= 2006 Sony Ericsson Bangalore Open =

- Date: 13-19 February
- Edition: 4th
- Category: Tier III
- Draw: 32S / 16D
- Prize money: $175,000
- Surface: Hard / outdoor
- Location: Bangalore, Karnataka, India

Champions

Singles
- (Italy) Mara Santangelo

Doubles
- (South Africa) Liezel Huber / (India) Sania Mirza
- WTA Indian Open

The 2006 Sony Ericsson Bangalore Open was a WTA women's tennis tournament played on outdoor hard courts in Bangalore, Karnataka, India from 13 February until 19 February 2006. It was the fourth edition of the tournament and part of the Tier III category of the 2006 WTA Tour. Third-seeded Mara Santangelo won the singles title.

== Finals ==
=== Singles ===
(Italy) Mara Santangelo defeated (Croatia) Jelena Kostanić, 3–6, 7-6^{(7–5)}, 6–3

- It was Santangelo's only WTA singles title of her career.

=== Doubles ===
(South Africa) Liezel Huber / (India) Sania Mirza defeated (Russia) Anastasia Rodionova / (Russia) Elena Vesnina, 6–3, 6–3

== Entrants ==
=== Seeds ===
Player	Nationality	Seeding
Sania Mirza	IND	1
Shahar Pe'er	ISR	2
Mara Santangelo	ITA	3
Sybille Bammer	AUT	4
Aiko Nakamura	JPN	5
Jelena Kostanić	CRO	6
Elena Vesnina	RUS	7
Emma Laine	FIN	8

=== Other entrants ===
The following players received entry from the qualifying draw:

- (Slovakia) Katarína Kachlíková
- (Austria) Daniela Kix
- (Russia) Alla Kudryavtseva
- (Belarus) Tatiana Poutchek

The following players received wildcards into the main draw

- (India) Ankita Bhambri
- (India) Rushmi Chakravarthi
- (India) Isha Lakhani
