= 2022 Chennai Open – Singles =

Singles
- 2022 Chennai Open

Final
- Champion: (Czech Republic) Linda Fruhvirtová
- Runner-up: (Poland) Magda Linette
- Score: 4–6, 6–3, 6–4

Details
- Draw: 32
- Seeds: 8

Events
Singles	Doubles
← 2008 ·	WTA Indian Open	· 2025 →

Linda Fruhvirtová defeated Magda Linette in the final, 4–6, 6–3, 6–4 to win the singles tennis title at the 2022 WTA Indian Open. It was her maiden WTA Tour singles title.

Serena Williams was the champion from when the event was last held in 2008 in Bangalore, but she retired from professional tennis at the 2022 US Open.

== Seeds ==
1. (United States) Alison Riske-Amritraj (first round)
2. Varvara Gracheva (quarterfinals)
3. (Poland) Magda Linette (final)
4. (Germany) Tatjana Maria (second round)
5. (Sweden) Rebecca Peterson (second round)
6. (China) Wang Qiang (second round)
7. (Canada) Rebecca Marino (quarterfinals)
8. (France) Chloé Paquet (first round)

== Draw ==
Key

- Q = Qualifier
- WC = Wild card
- LL = Lucky loser
- Alt = Alternate
- ITF = ITF entry
- PR = Protected ranking
- SR = Special ranking
- SE = Special exempt
- JE = Junior exempt
- JR = Junior Accelerator Programme entrant
- CO = College Accelerator Programme entrant
- NG = Next Gen Accelerator Program entrant
- w/o = Walkover
- r = Retired
- d = Defaulted

=== Finals ===
Semifinals
(United Kingdom) Katie Swan	0^{r}
3	(Poland) Magda Linette	3
(Argentina) Nadia Podoroska	7	2	4
(Czech Republic) Linda Fruhvirtová	5	6	6

Final
3	(Poland) Magda Linette	6	3	4
(Czech Republic) Linda Fruhvirtová	4	6	6

=== Top half ===
First round
1	(United States) A Riske-Amritraj	2	3
A Gasanova	6	6
(Netherlands) A Hartono	1	2
(United Kingdom) K Swan	6	6
Q	(Croatia) J Fett	0	4
Q	(Japan) N Hibino	6	6
PR	(Belgium) Y Wickmayer	4	6	4
6	(China) Q Wang	6	1	6
3	(Poland) M Linette	6	6
(Japan) M Uchijima	4	0
O Selekhmeteva	6	6
(Greece) D Papamichail	3	1
(Poland) K Kawa	6	6
(Australia) A Sharma	4	3
A Blinkova	5	2
7	(Canada) R Marino	7	6

Second round
A Gasanova	6^{5}	2
(United Kingdom) K Swan	7^{7}	6
Q	(Japan) N Hibino	6	6
6	(China) Q Wang	2	3
3	(Poland) M Linette	6	6
O Selekhmeteva	2	0
(Poland) K Kawa	5	3
7	(Canada) R Marino	7	6

Quarterfinals
(United Kingdom) K Swan	6	3	6
Q	(Japan) N Hibino	3	6	3
3	(Poland) M Linette	7^{12}	6
7	(Canada) R Marino	6^{10}	3

Semifinals
(United Kingdom) K Swan	0^{r}
3	(Poland) M Linette	3

=== Bottom half ===
First round
8	(France) C Paquet	6	4	3
WC	(India) K Thandi	4	6	6
(Switzerland) J Züger	6^{4}	2
WC	(Canada) E Bouchard	7^{7}	6
(Argentina) N Podoroska	6	6
Q	(Japan) K Okamura	4	3
WC	(India) A Raina	0	1
4	(Germany) T Maria	6	6
5	(Sweden) R Peterson	6	7^{7}
(Andorra) V Jiménez Kasintseva	2	6^{4}
Q	(Chinese Taipei) E-s Liang	6	1	3
(Czech Republic) L Fruhvirtová	4	6	6
Q	(Australia) O Tjandramulia	1	1
(Canada) C Zhao	6	6
Q	M Tkacheva	3	2
2	V Gracheva	6	6

Second round
WC	(India) K Thandi	2	6^{2}
WC	(Canada) E Bouchard	6	7^{7}
(Argentina) N Podoroska	3	6	7^{8}
4	(Germany) T Maria	6	2	6^{6}
5	(Sweden) R Peterson	4	2
(Czech Republic) L Fruhvirtová	6	6
(Canada) C Zhao	1	5
2	V Gracheva	6	7

Quarterfinals
WC	(Canada) E Bouchard	6	4	2
(Argentina) N Podoroska	1	6	6
(Czech Republic) L Fruhvirtová	6	6
2	V Gracheva	4	3

Semifinals
(Argentina) N Podoroska	7	2	4
(Czech Republic) L Fruhvirtová	5	6	6

== Qualifying ==
=== Seeds ===
1. (Japan) Yuki Naito (qualifying competition)
2. (Japan) Nao Hibino (qualified)
3. (Israel) Lina Glushko (qualifying competition)
4. (Bulgaria) Isabella Shinikova (qualifying competition)
5. (Australia) Lizette Cabrera (first round)
6. (Lithuania) Justina Mikulskytė (qualifying competition)
7. (Croatia) Jana Fett (qualified)
8. (Latvia) Daniela Vismane (qualifying competition)
9. (France) Carole Monnet (first round)
10. Ekaterina Kazionova (first round)
11. (Japan) Kyōka Okamura (qualified)
12. (Chinese Taipei) Liang En-shuo (qualified)

=== Qualifiers ===
1. (Australia) Olivia Tjandramulia
2. (Japan) Nao Hibino
3. (Japan) Kyōka Okamura
4. Mariia Tkacheva
5. (Croatia) Jana Fett
6. (Chinese Taipei) Liang En-shuo

=== Qualifying draw ===
==== First qualifier ====
First round
1	(Japan) Yuki Naito	6	6
WC	(India) Lakshmi Prabha Arunkumar	4	1
(Australia) Olivia Tjandramulia	6	6
10	Ekaterina Kazionova	3	1

Qualifying competition
1	(Japan) Yuki Naito	3	6^{9}
(Australia) Olivia Tjandramulia	6	7^{11}

==== Second qualifier ====
First round
2	(Japan) Nao Hibino	6	6
WC	(India) Sai Chamarthi	1	0
PR	Sofya Lansere	6	5	3
8	(Latvia) Daniela Vismane	4	7	6

Qualifying competition
2	(Japan) Nao Hibino	7	6
8	(Latvia) Daniela Vismane	5	0

==== Third qualifier ====
First round
3	(Israel) Lina Glushko	4	6	7^{7}
Maria Timofeeva	6	1	6^{3}
(India) Sowjanya Bavisetti	4	0
11	(Japan) Kyōka Okamura	6	6

Qualifying competition
3	(Israel) Lina Glushko	3	1
11	(Japan) Kyōka Okamura	6	6

==== Fourth qualifier ====
First round
4	(Bulgaria) Isabella Shinikova	6	6
Ekaterina Yashina	2	2
Mariia Tkacheva	6	1	6
9	(France) Carole Monnet	2	6	0

Qualifying competition
4	(Bulgaria) Isabella Shinikova	4	2
Mariia Tkacheva	6	6

==== Fifth qualifier ====
First round
5	(Australia) Lizette Cabrera	6	5	4
(Thailand) Peangtarn Plipuech	4	7	6
PR	(Australia) Kaylah McPhee	5	4
7	(Croatia) Jana Fett	7	6

Qualifying competition
(Thailand) Peangtarn Plipuech	6	2	2
7	(Croatia) Jana Fett	4	6	6

==== Sixth qualifier ====
First round
6	(Lithuania) Justina Mikulskytė	6	6
(India) Riya Bhatia	4	0
(India) Rutuja Bhosale	3	2
12	(Chinese Taipei) Liang En-shuo	6	6

Qualifying competition
6	(Lithuania) Justina Mikulskytė	1	1
12	(Chinese Taipei) Liang En-shuo	6	6
