= 2022 Chennai Open – Doubles =

Doubles
- 2022 Chennai Open

Final
- Champions: (Canada) Gabriela Dabrowski (Brazil) Luisa Stefani
- Runners-up: Anna Blinkova (Georgia (country)) Natela Dzalamidze
- Score: 6–1, 6–2

Details
- Draw: 16
- Seeds: 4

Events
Singles	Doubles
- WTA Indian Open

Gabriela Dabrowski and Luisa Stefani defeated Anna Blinkova and Natela Dzalamidze in the final, 6–1, 6–2 to win the doubles tennis title at the 2022 WTA Indian Open.

Peng Shuai and Sun Tiantian were the champions from when the event was last held in 2008 in Bangalore, but they had both since retired from professional tennis.

== Seeds ==
1. (Canada) Gabriela Dabrowski / (Brazil) Luisa Stefani (champions)
2. (United States) Kaitlyn Christian / Lidziya Marozava (first round)
3. (Georgia (country)) Oksana Kalashnikova / (Ukraine) Nadiia Kichenok (first round)
4. (China) Han Xinyun / (Poland) Katarzyna Kawa (first round)

== Draw ==
Key

- Q = Qualifier
- WC = Wild card
- LL = Lucky loser
- Alt = Alternate
- ITF = ITF entry
- PR = Protected ranking
- SR = Special ranking
- SE = Special exempt
- JE = Junior exempt
- JR = Junior Accelerator Programme entrant
- CO = College Accelerator Programme entrant
- NG = Next Gen Accelerator Program entrant
- w/o = Walkover
- r = Retired
- d = Defaulted

=== Draw ===
First round
1	(Canada) G Dabrowski (Brazil) L Stefani	6	6
(Greece) D Papamichail (United Kingdom) K Swan	4	1
(Indonesia) J Rompies (India) P Thombare	6	6^{5}	[4]
Alt	(India) R Bhosale (India) K Thandi	3	7^{7}	[10]
3	(Georgia (country)) O Kalashnikova (Ukraine) N Kichenok	6	2	[8]
(Lithuania) J Mikulskytė (United Kingdom) E Webley-Smith	3	6	[10]
(Thailand) P Plipuech (Japan) M Uchijima	6	7
WC	(India) S Balu (India) R Bhatia	2	5
(India) A Raina (Netherlands) R van der Hoek	1	4
A Gasanova; O Selekhmeteva	6	6
WC	(Canada) E Bouchard (Belgium) Y Wickmayer	6	6
4	(China) X Han (Poland) K Kawa	2	4
(Netherlands) A Hartono (Australia) O Tjandramulia	6	6
(Australia) A Sharma; E Yashina	3	1
A Blinkova (Georgia (country)) N Dzalamidze	5	6	[10]
2	(United States) K Christian; L Marozava	7	1	[8]

Quarterfinals
1	(Canada) G Dabrowski (Brazil) L Stefani	6	6
Alt	(India) R Bhosale (India) K Thandi	0	3
(Lithuania) J Mikulskytė (United Kingdom) E Webley-Smith	2	0
(Thailand) P Plipuech (Japan) M Uchijima	6	6
A Gasanova; O Selekhmeteva	7	3	[10]
WC	(Canada) E Bouchard (Belgium) Y Wickmayer	5	6	[12]
(Netherlands) A Hartono (Australia) O Tjandramulia	3	6	[5]
A Blinkova (Georgia (country)) N Dzalamidze	6	4	[10]

Semifinals
1	(Canada) G Dabrowski (Brazil) L Stefani	6	6
(Thailand) P Plipuech (Japan) M Uchijima	3	3
WC	(Canada) E Bouchard (Belgium) Y Wickmayer	3	1^{r}
A Blinkova (Georgia (country)) N Dzalamidze	6	1

Final
1	(Canada) G Dabrowski (Brazil) L Stefani	6	6
A Blinkova (Georgia (country)) N Dzalamidze	1	2
