= 2008 Canara Bank Bangalore Open – Doubles =

Doubles
- 2008 Canara Bank Bangalore Open

Final
- Champions: (China) Peng Shuai (China) Sun Tiantian
- Runners-up: (Chinese Taipei) Chan Yung-jan (Chinese Taipei) Chuang Chia-jung
- Score: 6–4, 5–7, 10–8

Details
- Draw: 16
- Seeds: 4

Events
Singles	Doubles
← 2007 ·	WTA Indian Open	· 2022 →

In the final, Peng Shuai and Sun Tiantian beat the defending champions Chan Yung-jan and Chuang Chia-jung to win their title 6–4, 5–7, 10–8.

== Doubles results ==
=== Seeds ===
1. (Chinese Taipei) Chan Yung-jan / (Chinese Taipei) Chuang Chia-jung (finals)
2. (China) Yan Zi / (China) Zheng Jie (first round)
3. (China) Peng Shuai / (China) Sun Tiantian (champions)
4. (Russia) Anastasia Rodionova / (Russia) Yaroslava Shvedova (quarterfinals)

Key

- Q = Qualifier
- WC = Wild card
- LL = Lucky loser
- Alt = Alternate
- ITF = ITF entry
- PR = Protected ranking
- SR = Special ranking
- SE = Special exempt
- JE = Junior exempt
- JR = Junior Accelerator Programme entrant
- CO = College Accelerator Programme entrant
- NG = Next Gen Accelerator Program entrant
- w/o = Walkover
- r = Retired
- d = Defaulted

=== Draw ===
First round
1	(Chinese Taipei) Y-j Chan (Chinese Taipei) C-j Chuang	6	5	[10]
(Switzerland) E Gagliardi (Switzerland) P Schnyder	3	7	[6]
(Japan) A Morita (Japan) J Namigata	3	6	[10]
WC	(India) A Bhambri (India) S Bhambri	6	4	[4]
4	(Russia) A Rodionova (Russia) Y Shvedova	6	6
(Australia) M Adamczak (United States) S Rao	0	1
(Romania) Á Szatmári (France) A Védy	6	4	[7]
(Belarus) E Dzehalevich (Romania) M Niculescu	4	6	[10]
WC	(United States) S Williams (United States) V Williams	7	6
(Romania) A Ehritt-Vanc (Thailand) T Tanasugarn	6^{5}	4
(Russia) V Manasieva (Russia) V Zvonareva	3	4
3	(China) S Peng (China) T Sun	6	6
(China) C Ji (China) S Sun	2	7	[10]
(Germany) A Bachmann (Belgium) D Feys	6	5	[7]
(Uzbekistan) A Amanmuradova (Ukraine) O Savchuk	6	3	[10]
2	(China) Z Yan (China) J Zheng	3	6	[8]

Quarterfinals
1	(Chinese Taipei) Y-j Chan (Chinese Taipei) C-j Chuang	7	6
(Japan) A Morita (Japan) J Namigata	6^{0}	3
4	(Russia) A Rodionova (Russia) Y Shvedova	7	3	[8]
(Belarus) E Dzehalevich (Romania) M Niculescu	6^{5}	6	[10]
WC	(United States) S Williams (United States) V Williams	7	2	[9]
3	(China) S Peng (China) T Sun	5	6	[11]
(China) C Ji (China) S Sun	6	7
(Uzbekistan) A Amanmuradova (Ukraine) O Savchuk	3	5

Semifinals
1	(Chinese Taipei) Y-j Chan (Chinese Taipei) C-j Chuang	6	7
(Belarus) E Dzehalevich (Romania) M Niculescu	1	5
3	(China) S Peng (China) T Sun	6	6
(China) C Ji (China) S Sun	3	2

Finals
1	(Chinese Taipei) Y-j Chan (Chinese Taipei) C-j Chuang	4	7	[8]
3	(China) S Peng (China) T Sun	6	5	[10]
