= Linda Fruhvirtová =

Czech tennis player (born 2005)

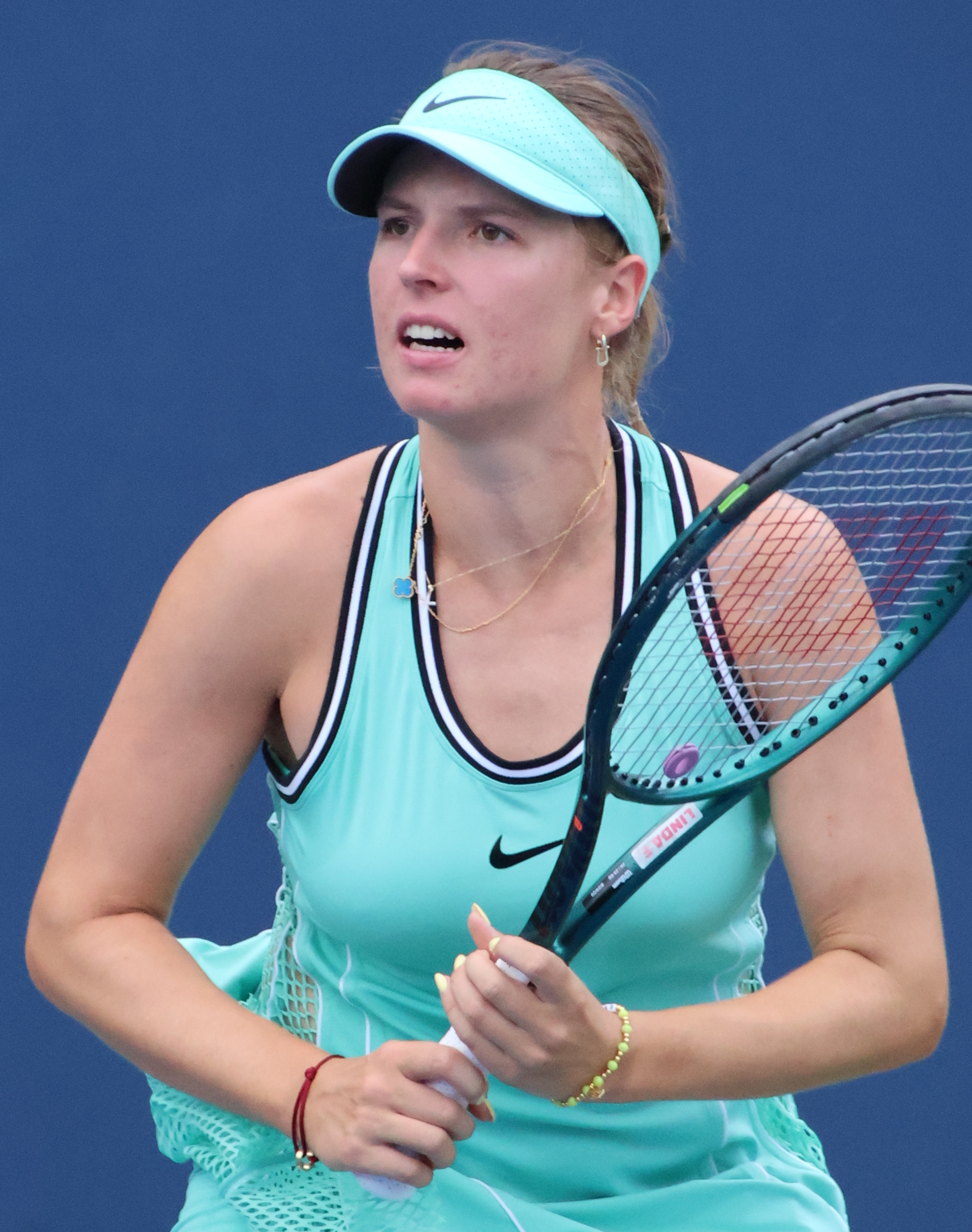
- Fruhvirtová at the 2026 US Open
- Country (sports): Czech Republic
- Born: 1 May 2005 (age 21) Prague, Czech Republic
- Height: 1.72 m (5 ft 8 in)
- Plays: Right (two-handed backhand)
- Prize money: US$ 2,218,102

Singles
- Career record: 159–144
- Career titles: 1
- Highest ranking: No. 49 (26 June 2023)
- Current ranking: No. 181 (28 September 2026)

Grand Slam singles results
- Australian Open: 4R (2023)
- French Open: 1R (2023, 2026)
- Wimbledon: 1R (2023, 2025)
- US Open: 2R (2022)

Doubles
- Career record: 25–26
- Career titles: 2 ITF
- Highest ranking: No. 187 (9 October 2023)
- Current ranking: No. 899 (28 September 2026)

Grand Slam doubles results
- Australian Open: 2R (2023)
- Wimbledon: 1R (2023)
- US Open: 1R (2023)
- Last updated on: 4 October 2026.

Linda Fruhvirtová (Czech pronunciation: [ˈlɪnda ˈfruɦvɪrtovaː]; born 1 May 2005) is a Czech professional tennis player. She has a career-high WTA singles ranking of world No. 49, achieved on 26 June 2023 and a best in doubles of No. 187, reached on 9 October 2023.

Fruhvirtová has won one WTA Tour singles title at the 2022 Chennai Open.

== Early life and background ==
Born on 1 May 2005 in the Czech Republic, Linda Fruhvirtová has a younger sister, Brenda, who is also a tennis player. Linda and Brenda were recipients of Patrick Mouratoglou's foundation. Linda has been training at the Mouratoglou Tennis Academy in Southern France since 2017; she also trained at the Evert Tennis Academy in January 2021.

== Career ==
=== Juniors ===
In 2019, at the junior level, Fruhvirtová won the singles and doubles titles at the Petits As. Her sister Brenda won the singles title the year after, making them the first members of the same family to win the title for two consecutive years.

Linda Fruhvirtová achieved an ITF Junior career-high ranking of world No. 2, on 13 December 2021.

==== Junior Grand Slam performance ====
Singles:

- Australian Open: 1R (2020)
- French Open: 2R (2020, 2021)
- Wimbledon: SF (2021)
- US Open: 3R (2021)

Doubles:

- Australian Open: SF (2020)
- French Open: QF (2021)
- Wimbledon: SF (2021)
- US Open: QF (2021)

=== 2020–21: WTA Tour and top 300 debuts ===
Fruhvirtová made her WTA Tour main-draw debut at the 2020 Prague Open, receiving wildcards into the singles and doubles tournaments. She also received a wildcard from the 2021 Miami Open for the qualifying where she was defeated in the first round by Nina Stojanović. In April, she received a wildcard for the main draw at the WTA 250 MUSC Health Open where she won her first WTA singles match when Alizé Cornet retired in the third set. She progressed through the quarterfinals by defeating Emma Navarro in straight sets in the next round, before losing to eventual champion Astra Sharma. Fruhvirtová, at only 15, became the youngest player in the top 400 at world No. 361, on 19 April 2021, raising 138 spots in the singles rankings. She played another WTA 250 main draw in Cleveland as lucky loser. She defeated Tara Moore, before losing to Magda Linette. She reached quarterfinals at the WTA 125 Korea Open, before losing to Ekaterina Kazionova, in three sets. She ended the season ranked No. 296 on 15 November 2021.

=== 2022: Major & top 100 debuts, WTA Tour title & 1000 fourth round ===
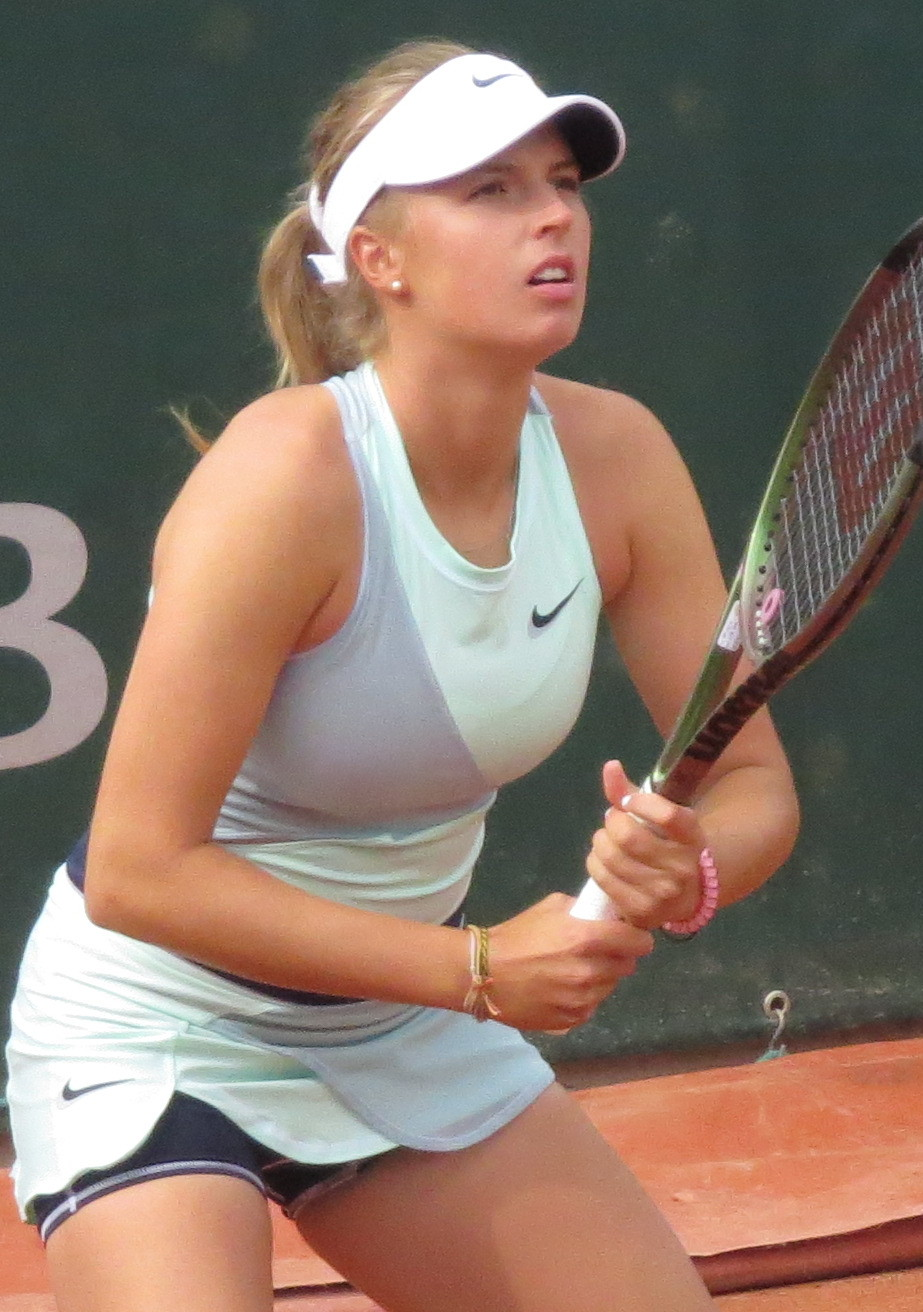
Fruhvirtová at her major debut in 2022 French Open qualifying

Fruhvirtová received a main-draw wildcard for the Miami Open to make her debut at the WTA 1000 level. In the first round, she defeated Danka Kovinić for her first WTA 1000-level win. In the second round, she recorded the biggest victory of her career, defeating 20th seed and world No. 24, Elise Mertens, her first over a top 25 opponent. She then recorded her first top 20 win, defeating former world No. 1, Victoria Azarenka, which secured her a debut in the top 200 on 4 April 2022.

At the US Open, Fruhvirtová succeeded in getting to the main draw after three qualifying wins for her Grand Slam debut. In her first Grand Slam main-draw match, she defeated Wang Xinyu. Her journey was stopped by Garbiñe Muguruza who eliminated her in the following round.

At the Chennai Open, Fruhvirtová won her first WTA Tour title when she beat Magda Linette in the final, in three sets. Fruhvirtová became the first 2005-born player to win a WTA Tour title. With this win, she moved into the top 100 for the first time in her career, at No. 74 in the singles rankings on 19 September 2022.

=== 2023: Australian Open fourth round, grass court quarterfinal, top 50 ===
On her debut at the Australian Open, she reached the fourth round of this Grand Slam defeating Jaimee Fourlis, Kimberly Birrell and Markéta Vondroušová, before losing to Donna Vekić. On 20 March 2023, she reached world No. 50, becoming the youngest player in the top 50, at age 17.

At the Birmingham Classic, she defeated Elina Svitolina and sixth seed Bernarda Pera to make it through to her first grass-court quarterfinals, where she lost to top seed Barbora Krejčíková.

In September, at the 2023 Ningbo Open she reached her second WTA Tour semifinal with a win over eight seed Lucia Bronzetti.

=== 2024–26: WTA 1000 third round, Ostrava quarterfinal ===
At the 2024 Nottingham Open, Fruhvirtová qualified for the main draw and defeated Lily Miyazaki, before losing to top seed Ons Jabeur in the second round. In October 2024, she reached the same stage at the Jiangxi Open with a win over Kathinka von Deichmann but lost to sixth seed Arantxa Rus.

In March 2025, at the Miami Open, Fruhvirtová qualified for the main draw and defeated fellow qualifier Claire Liu. Next she defeated 16th seed Beatriz Haddad Maia to reach her second WTA 1000 third round at the same tournament, recording her second career top 20 win. She lost to Magda Linette in the third round.

Given a wildcard entry into the WTA 125 2025 Puerto Vallarta Open, Fruhvirtová finished runner-up, after receiving a walkover against eighth seed Hailey Baptiste followed by wins over qualifier Priscilla Hon, second seed Maya Joint and Heather Watson to reach the final, which she lost to top seed Jaqueline Cristian in straight sets. She was also a finalist at the WTA 125 Birmingham Open, losing to fifth seed Greet Minnen.

At the 2025 Wimbledon Championships, wins over Lea Bošković, Nuria Párrizas Díaz, Ena Shibahara saw Fruhvirtová qualify for a major main-draw for the first time since the 2024 Australian Open, although she lost in the opening round to 24th seed Elise Mertens in straight sets.

At the 2025 Chennai Open, where she was the defending champion from the last time the event was held in 2022, Fruhvirtová defeated qualifier Astrid Lew Yan Foon, before losing to fourth seed and eventual champion Janice Tjen in the second round.

Fruhvirtová registered wins over qualifier Mona Barthel and fourth seed Rebecca Šramková to reach the quarterfinals at the 2026 Ostrava Open, at which point her run was ended by eventual champion Katie Boulter.

== Performance timelines ==
Key
W	F	SF	QF	#R	RR	Q#	P#	DNQ	A	Z#	PO	G	S	B	NMS	NTI	P	NH

(W) winner; (F) finalist; (SF) semifinalist; (QF) quarterfinalist; (#R) rounds 4, 3, 2, 1; (RR) round-robin stage; (Q#) qualification round; (P#) preliminary round; (DNQ) did not qualify; (A) absent; (Z#) Davis/Fed Cup Zonal Group (with number indication) or (PO) play-off; (G) gold, (S) silver or (B) bronze Olympic/Paralympic medal; (NMS) not a Masters tournament; (NTI) not a Tier I tournament; (P) postponed; (NH) not held; (SR) strike rate (events won / competed); (W–L) win–loss record.
To avoid confusion and double counting, these charts are updated at the conclusion of a tournament or when the player's participation has ended.

Only main-draw results in WTA Tour, Grand Slam tournaments, Billie Jean King Cup, Hopman Cup, United Cup and Olympic Games are included in win–loss records.

=== Singles ===
Current through the 2026 Wuhan Open.

Tournament	2020	2021	2022	2023	2024	2025	2026	SR	W–L	Win %
Grand Slam tournaments
Australian Open	A	A	A	4R	1R	Q1	2R	0 / 3	4–3	57%
French Open	A	A	Q2	1R	Q2	Q1	1R	0 / 2	0–2	0%
Wimbledon	NH	A	Q1	1R	Q2	1R	Q1	0 / 2	0–2	0%
US Open	A	A	2R	1R	Q1	Q1	Q2	0 / 2	1–2	33%
Win–Loss	0–0	0–0	1–1	3–4	0–1	0–1	1–2	0 / 9	5–9	36%
National representation
Billie Jean King Cup	A (Note: Edition is split into the two years due to COVID-19.)		SF (Note: Despite not playing in the Finals stage, she played in the Qualifying round.)	A	A	A	A	0 / 1	0–1	0%
WTA 1000 tournaments
Qatar Open	A	NTI	A	NTI	A	A	A	0 / 0	0–0	–
Dubai Championships	NTI	A	NTI	2R	A	A	A	0 / 1	1–1	50%
Indian Wells Open	NH	A	Q1	2R	Q2	A	Q2	0 / 1	1–1	50%
Miami Open	NH	Q1	4R	1R	1R	3R	1R	0 / 5	5–5	50%
Madrid Open	NH	A	1R	2R	1R	1R	Q1	0 / 4	1–4	20%
Italian Open	A	A	A	1R	1R	A	A	0 / 2	0–2	0%
Canadian Open	NH	A	A	Q1	A	A	A	0 / 0	0–0	–
Cincinnati Open	A	A	A	Q1	A	A	A	0 / 0	0–0	–
China Open	Not Held			2R	Q1	Q1	2R	0 / 2	2–2	50%
Wuhan Open	Not Held				Q1	A	A	0 / 0	0–0	–
Guadalajara Open	Not Held		1R	A	Not Tier I			0 / 1	0–1	0%
Win–Loss	0–0	0–0	3–3	4–6	0–3	2–2	1–2	0 / 16	10–16	38%
Career statistics
	2020	2021	2022	2023	2024	2025	2026	SR	W–L	Win %
Tournaments	1	2	8	21	9	6	10	Career total: 57		
Titles	0	0	1	0	0	0	0	Career total: 1		
Finals	0	0	1	0	0	0	0	Career total: 1		
Hard win–loss	0–0	1–1	9–5	12–14	2–6	3–3	4–8	1 / 38	31–37	46%
Clay win–loss	0–1	2–1	1–3	2–5	0–2	1–2	0–2	0 / 15	6–16	27%
Grass win–loss	0–0	0–0	0–0	2–2	1–1	0–1	0–0	0 / 4	3–4	43%
Overall win–loss	0–1	3–2	10–8	16–21	3–9	4–6	4–10	1 / 57	40–57	41%
Win %	0%	60%	56%	43%	25%	40%	29%	Career total: 41%		
Year-end ranking	793	296	78	89	201	137				

=== Doubles ===
Current through the 2026 Wimbledon Championships.

Tournament	2020	2021	2022	2023	2024	2025	2026	SR	W–L	Win%
Grand Slam tournaments
Australian Open	A	A	A	2R	1R	A	A	0 / 2	1–2	33%
French Open	A	A	A	A	A	A	A	0 / 0	0–0	–
Wimbledon	NH	A	A	1R	A	A	A	0 / 1	0–1	0%
US Open	A	A	A	1R	A	A	A	0 / 1	0–1	0%
Win–Loss	0–0	0–0	0–0	1–3	0–1	0–0	0–0	0 / 4	1–4	20%
WTA 1000 tournaments
Qatar Open	A	NTI	A	NTI	A	A	A	0 / 0	0–0	–
Dubai Championships	NTI	A	NTI	1R	A	A	A	0 / 1	0–1	0%
Indian Wells Open	NH	A	A	A	A	A	A	0 / 0	0–0	–
Miami Open	NH	A	A	1R	A	A	A	0 / 1	0–1	0%
Madrid Open	NH	A	A	1R	A	A	A	0 / 1	0–1	0%
Italian Open	A	A	A	A	A	A	A	0 / 0	0–0	–
Canadian Open	NH	A	A	A	A	A	A	0 / 0	0–0	–
Cincinnati Open	A	A	A	A	A	A	A	0 / 0	0–0	–
China Open	Not Held			A	A	A	A	0 / 0	0–0	–
Wuhan Open	Not Held				A	A	A	0 / 0	0–0	–
Guadalajara Open	Not Held		2R	A	Not Tier I			0 / 1	1–1	50%
Win–Loss	0–0	0–0	1–1	0–3	0–0	0–0	0–0	0 / 4	1–4	20%
Career statistics
	2020	2021	2022	2023	2024	2025	2026	SR	W–L	Win%
Tournaments	1	0	1	11	3	0	0	Career total: 16		
Titles	0	0	0	0	0	0	0	Career total: 0		
Finals	0	0	0	0	0	0	0	Career total: 0		
Hard win–loss	0–0	0–0	1–1	4–7	0–3	0–0	0–0	0 / 13	5–11	31%
Clay win–loss	0–1	0–0	0–0	0–1	0–0	0–0	0–0	0 / 2	0–2	0%
Grass win–loss	0–0	0–0	0–0	0–1	0–0	0–0	0–0	0 / 1	0–1	0%
Overall win–loss	0–1	0–0	1–1	4–9	0–3	0–0	0–0	0 / 16	5–14	26%
Year-end ranking	997	693	341	236	1446	1233				

== WTA Tour finals ==
=== Singles: 1 (title) ===
Legend WTA 250 (1–0)	Finals by surface Hard (1–0)	Finals by setting Outdoor (1–0)

Result	Date	Tournament	Tier	Surface	Opponent	Score
Win	Sep 2022	Chennai Open, India	WTA 250	Hard	(Poland) Magda Linette	4–6, 6–3, 6–4

== WTA 125 finals ==
=== Singles: 2 (2 runner-ups) ===
Result	W–L	Date	Tournament	Surface	Opponent	Score
Loss	0–1	Mar 2025	Puerto Vallarta Open, Mexico	Hard	(Romania) Jaqueline Cristian	5–7, 4–6
Loss	0–2	Jun 2025	Birmingham Open, United Kingdom	Grass	(Belgium) Greet Minnen	2–6, 1–6

== ITF Circuit finals ==
=== Singles: 7 (3 titles, 4 runner-ups) ===
Legend W50 tournaments (0–2) W25 tournaments (1–1) W15 tournaments (2–1)	Finals by surface Hard (3–4)

Result	W–L	Date	Tournament	Tier	Surface	Opponent	Score
Loss	0–1	Dec 2020	ITF Monastir, Tunisia	W15	Hard	(Belarus) Yuliya Hatouka	1–6, 7–5, 3–6
Loss	0–2	Jan 2021	ITF Hamburg, Germany	W25	Hard (i)	(China) Zheng Qinwen	2–6, 3–6
Win	1–2	Feb 2021	ITF Monastir, Tunisia	W15	Hard	(France) Manon Arcangioli	7–6^{(7–5)}, 7–5
Win	2–2	Feb 2021	ITF Monastir, Tunisia	W15	Hard	(Algeria) Inès Ibbou	6–2, 6–2
Win	3–2	Feb 2022	ITF Cancún, Mexico	W25	Hard	(Canada) Rebecca Marino	6–3, 6–4
Loss	3–3	Sep 2025	ITF Leiria, Portugal	W50	Hard	Alina Korneeva	1–6, 5–7
Loss	3–4	Sep 2026	ITF Leiria, Portugal	W50	Hard	(United Kingdom) Hannah Klugman	5–7, 6–4, 1–6

=== Doubles: 3 (2 titles, 1 runner-up) ===
Legend W25 tournaments (0–1) W15 tournaments (2–0)	Finals by surface Hard (2–1)

Result	W–L	Date	Tournament	Tier	Surface	Partner	Opponents	Score
Loss	0–1	Dec 2020	ITF Selva Gardena, Italy	W25	Hard (i)	(Poland) Maja Chwalińska	(Italy) Matilde Paoletti (Italy) Lisa Pigato	5–7, 1–6
Win	1–1	Feb 2021	ITF Monastir, Tunisia	W15	Hard	(Russia) Maria Timofeeva	(France) Nina Radovanovic (Georgia (country)) Sopiko Tsitskishvili	6–1, 6–2
Win	2–1	Feb 2021	ITF Monastir, Tunisia	W15	Hard	(Poland) Weronika Falkowska	(France) Yasmine Mansouri (Serbia) Elena Milovanović	6–3, 6–1

== Junior finals ==
=== ITF Junior Circuit ===
==== Singles: 9 (5 titles, 4 runner-ups) ====
Legend
Grade A (0–2)
Grade 1/B1 (3–1)
Grade 2 (2–0)
Grade 3 (0–1)

Result	W–L	Date	Tournament	Tier	Surface	Opponent	Score
Loss	0–1	Jan 2019	ITF Bromma, Sweden	Grade 3	Hard	(France) Séléna Janicijevic	2–6, 2–6
Loss	0–2	Mar 2019	ITF Sarawak, Malaysia	Grade 1	Hard	(Chinese Taipei) Joanna Garland	3–6, 5–7
Win	1–2	Apr 2019	ITF Piešťany, Slovakia	Grade 2	Clay	(Slovakia) Michaela Kadlecková	6–2, 6–3
Loss	1–3	Sep 2019	ITF Cape Town, South Africa	Grade A	Hard	(Philippines) Alex Eala	3–6, 3–6
Win	2–3	Mar 2021	ITF Santo Domingo, Dominican Republic	Grade 2	Hard	(United States) Gracie Epps	6–2, 6–1
Win	3–3	Jul 2021	ITF Roehampton, United Kingdom	Grade 1	Grass	(Czech Republic) Linda Klimovičová	4–6, 6–2, 6–3
Win	4–3	Nov 2021	ITF Guadalajara, Mexico	Grade 1	Clay	(Czech Republic) Brenda Fruhvirtová	6–4, 7–6^{(7–5)}
Loss	4–4	Nov 2021	ITF Mérida, Mexico	Grade A	Clay	(Czech Republic) Brenda Fruhvirtová	5–7, 5–7
Win	5–4	Dec 2021	ITF Bradenton, United States	Grade 1	Clay	(Czech Republic) Brenda Fruhvirtová	2–0 ret.

==== Doubles: 9 (4 titles, 5 runner-ups) ====
Legend
Grade A (0–2)
Grade 1/B1 (2–2)
Grade 2 (2–1)
Grade 3 (0–0)

Result	W–L	Date	Tournament	Tier	Surface	Partner	Opponents	Score
Loss	0–1	Oct 2018	ITF Sanxenxo, Spain	Grade 2	Hard	(Czech Republic) Markéta Panáčková	(Spain) Marta Custic (Poland) Martyna Kubka	5–7, 4–6
Loss	0–2	Jan 2019	ITF Prague, Czech Republic	Grade 1	Carpet	(Czech Republic) Kristyna Lavičková	(France) Aubane Droguet (France) Séléna Janicijevic	2–6, 7–5, [4–10]
Win	1–2	Mar 2019	ITF Sarawak, Malaysia	Grade 1	Hard	(Czech Republic) Kristyna Lavičková	(Romania) Fatima Ingrid Keita (South Korea) Ku Yeon-woo	6–1, 6–4
Win	2–2	Apr 2019	ITF Piešťany, Slovakia	Grade 2	Clay	(Czech Republic) Markéta Panáčková	(Slovakia) Michaela Kadlecková (Slovakia) Nina Stankovská	1–6, 6–2, [11–9]
Loss	2–3	Sep 2019	ITF Cape Town, South Africa	Grade A	Hard	(Poland) Weronika Baszak	(Slovenia) Živa Falkner (United Kingdom) Matilda Mutavdzic	6–3, 6–7^{(10–12)}, [7–10]
Win	3–3	Mar 2021	ITF Santo Domingo, Dominican Republic	Grade 2	Hard	(Czech Republic) Brenda Fruhvirtová	(Czech Republic) Lucie Havlíčková (Sweden) Klara Milicevic	6–4, 6–3
Win	4–3	Nov 2021	ITF Guadalajara, Mexico	Grade 1	Clay	(Czech Republic) Brenda Fruhvirtová	(United States) Liv Hovde (United States) Ava Krug	6–1, 6–3
Loss	4–4	Dec 2021	ITF Bradenton, United States	Grade 1	Clay	(Czech Republic) Brenda Fruhvirtová	(Croatia) Petra Marčinko (Russia) Diana Shnaider	3–6, 7–5, [9–11]
Loss	4–5	Dec 2021	ITF Plantation, United States	Grade A	Clay	(Czech Republic) Brenda Fruhvirtová	(Croatia) Petra Marčinko (Russia) Diana Shnaider	6–7^{(5–7)}, 0–6

== WTA Tour earnings ==
Current after the 2023 Canadian Open.

Year	Grand Slam titles	WTA titles	Total titles	Earnings ($)	Money list rank
2019	0	0	0	294	2421
2020	0	0	0	17,246	356
2021	0	0	0	23,337	404
2022	0	1	1	360,269	132
2023	0	0	0	565,181	58
Career	0	1	1	972,401	507

== Exhibition matches ==
=== Singles ===
Result	Date	Tournament	Surface	Opponent	Score
Loss	Jan 2023	Kooyong Classic, Melbourne, Australia	Hard	(Croatia) Donna Vekić	4–6, 3–6
Win	Jan 2023	Kooyong Classic, Melbourne, Australia	Hard	(United Kingdom) Harriet Dart	6–7^{(2)}, 6–3, [10–4]
Loss	Jan 2024	Kooyong Classic, Melbourne, Australia	Hard	(Australia) Taylah Preston	6–1, 6–7^{(4)}, [6–10]
