= 2007 Sony Ericsson International – Singles =

Singles
- 2007 Sony Ericsson International

Final
- Champion: (Russia) Yaroslava Shvedova
- Runner-up: (Italy) Mara Santangelo
- Score: 6–4, 6–4

Details
- Draw: 32
- Seeds: 8

Events
Singles	Doubles
- WTA Indian Open

Yaroslava Shvedova won the title, after defeating defending champion Mara Santangelo 6–4, 6–4 in the final.

== Singles results ==
=== Seeds ===
1. (Italy) Mara Santangelo (final)
2. (India) Sania Mirza (quarterfinals)
3. (Russia) Vasilisa Bardina (second round)
4. (Croatia) Jelena Kostanić Tošić (quarterfinals)
5. (Ukraine) Yuliana Fedak (first round)
6. (Chinese Taipei) Chan Yung-jan (first round)
7. (Thailand) Tamarine Tanasugarn (second round)
8. (Italy) Alberta Brianti (first round)

=== Draw ===
Key

- Q = Qualifier
- WC = Wild card
- LL = Lucky loser
- Alt = Alternate
- ITF = ITF entry
- PR = Protected ranking
- SR = Special ranking
- SE = Special exempt
- JE = Junior exempt
- JR = Junior Accelerator Programme entrant
- CO = College Accelerator Programme entrant
- NG = Next Gen Accelerator Program entrant
- w/o = Walkover
- r = Retired
- d = Defaulted

=== Finals ===
Semifinals
1	(Italy) Mara Santangelo	6	6
(Ukraine) Olga Savchuk	1	0
(Israel) Tzipora Obziler	5	2
(Russia) Yaroslava Shvedova	7	6

Finals
1	(Italy) Mara Santangelo	4	4
(Russia) Yaroslava Shvedova	6	6

=== Top half ===
First round
1	(Italy) M Santangelo	6	7^{7}
Q	(China) S Sun	2	6^{4}
(Uzbekistan) A Amanmuradova	6	6
(Slovakia) J Gajdošová	3	3
(Ukraine) Y Beygelzimer	6	6
Q	(Thailand) N Luangnam	2	1
Q	(Japan) Y Sema	1	6	6
5	(Ukraine) Y Fedak	6	3	4
4	(Croatia) J Kostanić Tošić	2	6	6
WC	(Australia) S Ferguson	6	3	4
(Slovakia) D Cibulková	6	6
WC	(India) T Iyer	0	2
(Ukraine) O Savchuk	6	6
(Ukraine) M Koryttseva	4	3
(Australia) A Molik	6	6
8	(Italy) A Brianti	4	3

Second round
1	(Italy) M Santangelo	3	7	6
(Uzbekistan) A Amanmuradova	6	5	2
(Ukraine) Y Beygelzimer	6	4	1
Q	(Japan) Y Sema	1	6	6
4	(Croatia) J Kostanić Tošić	6	6
(Slovakia) D Cibulková	4	1
(Ukraine) O Savchuk	6	4	6
(Australia) A Molik	4	6	4

Quarterfinals
1	(Italy) M Santangelo	6	6
Q	(Japan) Y Sema	1	4
4	(Croatia) J Kostanić Tošić	3	4
(Ukraine) O Savchuk	6	6

Semifinals
1	(Italy) M Santangelo	6	6
(Ukraine) O Savchuk	1	0

=== Bottom half ===
First round
6	(Chinese Taipei) Y-j Chan	6	5	2
(Hungary) M Czink	1	7	6
(Germany) S Klösel	2	4
(Chinese Taipei) S-w Hsieh	6	6
(Russia) A Kudryavtseva	6	3	3
(Israel) T Obziler	4	6	6
(Germany) K Barrois	7^{7}	4	6^{3}
3	(Russia) V Bardina	6^{4}	6	7^{7}
7	(Thailand) T Tanasugarn	6	6
Q	(Chinese Taipei) C-w Chan	3	3
WC	(India) S Uberoi	3	7^{7}	3
(Russia) Y Shvedova	6	6^{3}	6
(China) M Yuan	2	0
(Belarus) T Poutchek	6	6
(Slovakia) M Suchá	4	6	3
2	(India) S Mirza	6	4	6

Second round
(Hungary) M Czink	4	7^{7}	7
(Chinese Taipei) S-w Hsieh	6	6^{2}	5
(Israel) T Obziler	6	6
3	(Russia) V Bardina	1	2
7	(Thailand) T Tanasugarn	4	6	4
(Russia) Y Shvedova	6	3	6
(Belarus) T Poutchek	6	5	2
2	(India) S Mirza	3	7	6

Quarterfinals
(Hungary) M Czink	4	6^{3}
(Israel) T Obziler	6	7^{7}
(Russia) Y Shvedova	6^{2}	6	6
2	(India) S Mirza	7^{7}	4	4

Semifinals
(Israel) T Obziler	5	2
(Russia) Y Shvedova	7	6
