= WTA Indian Open =

WTA Tour
- Founded: 2003
- Abolished: 2026
- Editions: 8
- Location: Hyderabad, Bangalore, Chennai; India
- Venue: SAAP Tennis Complex (2003–05); S M Krishna Tennis Stadium (2006–08); SDAT Tennis Stadium (2022–2026)
- Category: WTA 250 (2022, 2025-2026)
- Surface: Hard – outdoors
- Draw: 32S / 16Q / 16D
- Prize money: $283,347 (2026)

Current champions (2026)
- Singles: (Poland) Magda Linette
- Doubles: (Switzerland) Naïma Karamoko (Switzerland) Simona Waltert

The Chennai Open, also known as the WTA Indian Open, is a tournament for professional female tennis players, held since 2003 in various Indian cities. It is a WTA Tour event played on outdoor hardcourts.

Following the restructuring of the WTA Tour in 2009, there were no WTA tournaments in India until 2022 (except some WTA Challengers), when the tournament came back as a WTA 250 event, called the Chennai Open. After a three-year hiatus the tournament did return when the WTA announced that it would make a comeback the last week of October 2025.

== History ==
The event started in 2003 as a Tier IV event. It was held in SAAP Tennis Complex in Hyderabad, Telangana until 2005. In 2006, the event was upgraded to a Tier III event, and was moved to Bangalore. In 2008, it was upgraded further to a Tier II event with a prize money of $600,000 – this made it the biggest women's tennis tournament in South and Southeast Asia that year.

The 2008 edition was won by 26-year-old, then eight-time Grand-Slam champion Serena Williams, who defeated Patty Schnyder in the final, winning her 29th WTA Tour title.

Chennai held a WTA 250 tournament in 2022 and 2025. It will host its last tournament in November 2026 before its franchise will be taken over by the Philippines in 2027.

== Sponsors ==
From 2003 to 2005, the event was sponsored by Andhra Pradesh Tourism (AP Tourism), and the tournament was named accordingly. In 2006 and 2007, the event was sponsored by Sony Ericsson, and the tournament was also named after the sponsor. In 2008, it was sponsored by the Canara Bank which would have continued to sponsor the event if it had been held 2009 onwards.

== Past finals ==
=== Singles ===
Location	Year	Champion	Runner-up	Score
Hyderabad
Hyderabad	↓ Tier IV event ↓			
Hyderabad	2003	(Thailand) Tamarine Tanasugarn	(Uzbekistan) Iroda Tulyaganova	6–4, 6–4
Hyderabad	2004	(Australia) Nicole Pratt	(Russia) Maria Kirilenko	7–6^{(7–3)}, 6–1
Hyderabad	2005	(India) Sania Mirza	(Ukraine) Alona Bondarenko	6–4, 5–7, 6–3
Bengaluru
Bengaluru	↓ Tier III event ↓			
Bengaluru	2006	(Italy) Mara Santangelo	(Croatia) Jelena Kostanić	3–6, 7–6^{(7–5)}, 6–3
Bengaluru	2007	(Russia) Yaroslava Shvedova	(Italy) Mara Santangelo	6–4, 6–4
Bengaluru	↓ Tier II event ↓			
Bengaluru	2008	(United States) Serena Williams	(Switzerland) Patty Schnyder	7–5, 6–3
Bengaluru	2009–2021	Not held		
Chennai
Chennai	↓ WTA 250 event ↓			
Chennai	2022	(Czech Republic) Linda Fruhvirtová	(Poland) Magda Linette	4–6, 6–3, 6–4
Chennai	2023–2024	Not held		
Chennai	2025	(Indonesia) Janice Tjen	(Australia) Kimberly Birrell	6–4, 6–3
Chennai	2026	(Poland) Magda Linette	(Indonesia) Janice Tjen	5–7, 6–1, 6–4

=== Doubles ===
Location	Year	Champions	Runners-up	Score
Hyderabad
Hyderabad	↓ Tier IV event ↓			
Hyderabad	2003	(Russia) Elena Likhovtseva (Uzbekistan) Iroda Tulyaganova	(Russia) Evgenia Kulikovskaya (Belarus) Tatiana Poutchek	6–4, 6–4
Hyderabad	2004	(South Africa) Liezel Huber (India) Sania Mirza	(China) Li Ting (China) Sun Tiantian	7–6^{(7–1)}, 6–4
Hyderabad	2005	(China) Yan Zi (China) Zheng Jie	(China) Li Ting (China) Sun Tiantian	6–4, 6–1
Bengaluru
Bengaluru	↓ Tier III event ↓			
Bengaluru	2006	(South Africa) Liezel Huber (2) (India) Sania Mirza (2)	(Russia) Anastasia Rodionova (Russia) Elena Vesnina	6–3, 6–3
Bengaluru	2007	(Chinese Taipei) Chan Yung-jan (Chinese Taipei) Chuang Chia-jung	(Chinese Taipei) Hsieh Su-wei (Russia) Alla Kudryavtseva	6–7^{(4–7)}, 6–2, [11–9]
Bengaluru	↓ Tier II event ↓			
Bengaluru	2008	(China) Peng Shuai (China) Sun Tiantian	(Chinese Taipei) Chan Yung-jan (Chinese Taipei) Chuang Chia-jung	6–4, 5–7, [10–8]
Bengaluru	2009–2021	Not held		
Chennai
Chennai	↓ WTA 250 event ↓			
Chennai	2022	(Canada) Gabriela Dabrowski (Brazil) Luisa Stefani	Anna Blinkova (Georgia (country)) Natela Dzalamidze	6–1, 6–2
Chennai	2023–2024	Not held		
Chennai	2025	(Indonesia) Aldila Sutjiadi (Indonesia) Janice Tjen	(Australia) Storm Hunter (Romania) Monica Niculescu	7–5, 6–4
Chennai	2026	(Switzerland) Naïma Karamoko (Switzerland) Simona Waltert	(India) Vaishnavi Adkar (India) Rutuja Bhosale	6–2, 6–0

== See also ==
- Bengaluru Open
- Royal Indian Open
- Mumbai Open
- Maharashtra Open
- List of tennis tournaments
