= Badminton at the Pan American Games =

- No. of events: 5 (men: 2; women: 2; mixed: 1)

Badminton has been part of the Pan American Games since the 1995 Games in Mar del Plata, Argentina. Canada has dominated the badminton events since its inception. At the most recent edition of the games in 2019, in Lima, five nations won medals, with Canada taking home four of the five titles.

== Venues ==
Games	Venue	Other sports hosted at venue	Capacity	Ref.
Mar del Plata 1995	CeNARD	Karate	1,000	
Winnipeg 1999	Winnipeg Convention Centre	Handball; Judo; Taekwondo; Wrestling		
Santo Domingo 2003	UASD Pavilion		1,700	
Rio de Janeiro 2007	Riocentro Pavilion 4B	Table tennis	1,462	
Guadalajara 2011	Multipurpose Gymnasium	Fencing	856	
Toronto 2015	Atos Markham Pan Am / Parapan Am Centre	Table tennis Water polo	2,000	
Lima 2019	Polideportivo 3	Roller sports figure Table tennis	860	
Santiago 2023	Olympic Training Center	Table tennis	1,200	

- The 1995 event was held in Buenos Aires, while 2015 was held in Markham.

== Medal table ==
Updated to include the 2023 edition.

Rank	Nation	Gold	Silver	Bronze	Total
1	Canada	25	21	14	60
2	United States	11	12	17	40
3	Guatemala	2	2	5	9
4	Brazil	1	3	9	13
5	Jamaica	1	0	5	6
6	Cuba	0	1	3	4
7	Independent Athletes Team	0	1	1	2
8	Peru	0	0	16	16
9	Mexico	0	0	7	7
10	Dominican Republic	0	0	1	1
10	El Salvador	0	0	1	1
10	Trinidad and Tobago	0	0	1	1
Totals (12 entries)		40	40	80	160

== Medalists ==
=== Men ===
Singles

Games	Gold	Silver	Bronze
1995 Mar del Plata	Jaimie Dawson; Canada	Iain Sydie; Canada	Mario Carulla; Peru
1995 Mar del Plata	Jaimie Dawson; Canada	Iain Sydie; Canada	Kevin Han; United States
1999 Winnipeg	Kevin Han; United States	Stuart Arthur; Canada	Mario Carulla; Peru
1999 Winnipeg	Kevin Han; United States	Stuart Arthur; Canada	Pedro Yang; Guatemala
2003 Santo Domingo	Mike Beres; Canada	Andrew Dabeka; Canada	Kyle Hunter; Canada
2003 Santo Domingo	Mike Beres; Canada	Andrew Dabeka; Canada	Pedro Yang; Guatemala
2007 Rio de Janeiro	Mike Beres; Canada	Kevin Cordón; Guatemala	Eric Go; United States
2007 Rio de Janeiro	Mike Beres; Canada	Kevin Cordón; Guatemala	Rodrigo Pacheco; Peru
2011 Guadalajara	Kevin Cordón; Guatemala	Osleni Guerrero; Cuba	Daniel Paiola; Brazil
2011 Guadalajara	Kevin Cordón; Guatemala	Osleni Guerrero; Cuba	Charles Pyne; Jamaica
2015 Toronto	Kevin Cordón; Guatemala	Andrew D'Souza; Canada	Osleni Guerrero; Cuba
2015 Toronto	Kevin Cordón; Guatemala	Andrew D'Souza; Canada	Howard Shu; United States
2019 Lima	Ygor Coelho; Brazil	Brian Yang; Canada	Jason Ho-Shue; Canada
2019 Lima	Ygor Coelho; Brazil	Brian Yang; Canada	Kevin Cordón; Guatemala
2023 Santiago	Brian Yang; Canada	Kevin Cordón; Independent Athletes Team	Uriel Canjura; El Salvador
2023 Santiago	Brian Yang; Canada	Kevin Cordón; Independent Athletes Team	Luis Ramón Garrido; Mexico

Doubles

Games	Gold	Silver	Bronze
1995 Mar del Plata	Anil Kaul and Iain Sydie; Canada	Kevin Han and Thomas Reidy; United States	Paul Leyow and Roy Paul jr. Jamaica
1995 Mar del Plata	Anil Kaul and Iain Sydie; Canada	Kevin Han and Thomas Reidy; United States	Jaimie Dawson and Darryl Yung; Canada
1999 Winnipeg	Brent Olynyk and Iain Sydie; Canada	Howard Bach and Mark Manha; United States	Mike Beres and Bryan Moody; Canada
1999 Winnipeg	Brent Olynyk and Iain Sydie; Canada	Howard Bach and Mark Manha; United States	Bernardo Monreal and Luis Lopezllera; Mexico
2003 Santo Domingo	Howard Bach and Kevin Han; United States	Pedro Yang and Erick Anguiano; Guatemala	Mike Beres and Kyle Hunter; Canada
2003 Santo Domingo	Howard Bach and Kevin Han; United States	Pedro Yang and Erick Anguiano; Guatemala	Bradley Graham and Charles Pyne; Jamaica
2007 Rio de Janeiro	Mike Beres and William Milroy; Canada	Howard Bach and Khan Malaythong; United States	Guilherme Kumasaka and Guilherme Pardo; Brazil
2007 Rio de Janeiro	Mike Beres and William Milroy; Canada	Howard Bach and Khan Malaythong; United States	Erick Anguiano and Pedro Yang; Guatemala
2011 Guadalajara	Howard Bach and Tony Gunawan; United States	Halim Haryanto and Sattawat Pongnairat; United States	Andrés López and Lino Muñoz; Mexico
2011 Guadalajara	Howard Bach and Tony Gunawan; United States	Halim Haryanto and Sattawat Pongnairat; United States	Adrian Liu and Derrick Ng; Canada
2015 Toronto	Phillip Chew and Sattawat Pongnairat; United States	Hugo Arthuso and Daniel Paiola; Brazil	Job Castillo and Lino Muñoz; Mexico
2015 Toronto	Phillip Chew and Sattawat Pongnairat; United States	Hugo Arthuso and Daniel Paiola; Brazil	William Cabrera and Nelson Javier; Dominican Republic
2019 Lima	Jason Ho-Shue and Nyl Yakura; Canada	Phillip Chew and Ryan Chew; United States	Osleni Guerrero and Leodannis Martínez; Cuba
2019 Lima	Jason Ho-Shue and Nyl Yakura; Canada	Phillip Chew and Ryan Chew; United States	Fabricio Farias and Francielton Farias; Brazil
2023 Santiago	Adam Dong and Nyl Yakura; Canada	Fabrício Farias and Davi Silva; Brazil	Aníbal Marroquín and Jonathan Solís; Independent Athletes Team
2023 Santiago	Adam Dong and Nyl Yakura; Canada	Fabrício Farias and Davi Silva; Brazil	Job Castillo and Luis Montoya; Mexico

=== Women ===
Singles

Games	Gold	Silver	Bronze
1995 Mar del Plata	Denyse Julien; Canada	Si-An Deng; Canada	Beverly Tang; Trinidad and Tobago
1995 Mar del Plata	Denyse Julien; Canada	Si-An Deng; Canada	Kathy Zimmermann; United States
1999 Winnipeg	Yeping Tang; United States	Charmaine Reid; Canada	Denyse Julien; Canada
1999 Winnipeg	Yeping Tang; United States	Charmaine Reid; Canada	Kara Solmundson; Canada
2003 Santo Domingo	Nigella Saunders; Jamaica	Anna Rice; Canada	Lorena Blanco; Peru
2003 Santo Domingo	Nigella Saunders; Jamaica	Anna Rice; Canada	Sandra Jimeno; Peru
2007 Rio de Janeiro	Eva Lee; United States	Charmaine Reid; Canada	Sarah MacMaster; Canada
2007 Rio de Janeiro	Eva Lee; United States	Charmaine Reid; Canada	Claudia Rivero; Peru
2011 Guadalajara	Michelle Li; Canada	Joycelyn Ko; Canada	Victoria Montero; Mexico
2011 Guadalajara	Michelle Li; Canada	Joycelyn Ko; Canada	Claudia Rivero; Peru
2015 Toronto	Michelle Li; Canada	Rachel Honderich; Canada	Jamie Subandhi; United States
2015 Toronto	Michelle Li; Canada	Rachel Honderich; Canada	Iris Wang; United States
2019 Lima	Michelle Li; Canada	Rachel Honderich; Canada	Iris Wang; United States
2019 Lima	Michelle Li; Canada	Rachel Honderich; Canada	Nikté Sotomayor; Guatemala
2023 Santiago	Beiwen Zhang; United States	Jennie Gai; United States	Rachel Chan; Canada
2023 Santiago	Beiwen Zhang; United States	Jennie Gai; United States	Taymara Oropesa; Cuba

Doubles

Games	Gold	Silver	Bronze
1995 Mar del Plata	Si-An Deng and Denyse Julien; Canada	Milaine Cloutier and Robbyn Hermitage; Canada	Ann French and Kathy Zimmerman; United States
1995 Mar del Plata	Si-An Deng and Denyse Julien; Canada	Milaine Cloutier and Robbyn Hermitage; Canada	Linda French and Erika von Heiland; United States
1999 Winnipeg	Robbyn Hermitage and Milaine Cloutier; Canada	Charmaine Reid and Denyse Julien; Canada	Adrienn Kocsis and Doriana Rivera; Peru
1999 Winnipeg	Robbyn Hermitage and Milaine Cloutier; Canada	Charmaine Reid and Denyse Julien; Canada	Stefanie Westermann and Kathy Zimmerman; United States
2003 Santo Domingo	Charmaine Reid and Helen Nichol; Canada	Denyse Julien and Anna Rice; Canada	Lorena Blanco and Valeria Rivera; Peru
2003 Santo Domingo	Charmaine Reid and Helen Nichol; Canada	Denyse Julien and Anna Rice; Canada	Doriana Rivera and Sandra Jimeno; Peru
2007 Rio de Janeiro	Eva Lee and Mesinee Mangkalakiri; United States	Fiona McKee and Charmaine Reid; Canada	Kuei Ya Chen and Jamie Subandhi; United States
2007 Rio de Janeiro	Eva Lee and Mesinee Mangkalakiri; United States	Fiona McKee and Charmaine Reid; Canada	Jie Ming Jin and Valeria Rivero; Peru
2011 Guadalajara	Alexandra Bruce and Michelle Li; Canada	Iris Wang and Rena Wang; United States	Grace Gao and Joycelyn Ko; Canada
2011 Guadalajara	Alexandra Bruce and Michelle Li; Canada	Iris Wang and Rena Wang; United States	Eva Lee and Paula Lynn Obañana; United States
2015 Toronto	Eva Lee and Paula Lynn Obañana; United States	Lohaynny Vicente and Luana Vicente; Brazil	Michelle Li and Rachel Honderich; Canada
2015 Toronto	Eva Lee and Paula Lynn Obañana; United States	Lohaynny Vicente and Luana Vicente; Brazil	Alexandra Bruce and Phyllis Chan; Canada
2019 Lima	Rachel Honderich and Kristen Tsai; Canada	Keui-Ya Chen and Jamie Hsu; United States	Tamires Santos and Fabiana Silva; Brazil
2019 Lima	Rachel Honderich and Kristen Tsai; Canada	Keui-Ya Chen and Jamie Hsu; United States	Jaqueline Lima and Sâmia Lima; Brazil
2023 Santiago	Catherine Choi and Josephine Wu; Canada	Annie Xu and Kerry Xu; United States	Romina Fregoso and Miriam Rodríguez; Mexico
2023 Santiago	Catherine Choi and Josephine Wu; Canada	Annie Xu and Kerry Xu; United States	Sâmia Lima and Juliana Viana Vieira; Brazil

=== Mixed ===
Doubles

Games	Gold	Silver	Bronze
1995 Mar del Plata	Darryl Yung and Denyse Julien; Canada	Anil Kaul and Si-An Deng; Canada	Mike Edstrom and Linda French; United States
1995 Mar del Plata	Darryl Yung and Denyse Julien; Canada	Anil Kaul and Si-An Deng; Canada	Paul Leyow and Terry Leyow; Jamaica
1999 Winnipeg	Iain Sydie and Denyse Julien; Canada	Brent Olynyk and Robbyn Hermitage; Canada	Mario Carulla and Adrienn Kocsis; Peru
1999 Winnipeg	Iain Sydie and Denyse Julien; Canada	Brent Olynyk and Robbyn Hermitage; Canada	Chris Hales and Yeping Tang; United States
2003 Santo Domingo	Philippe Bourret and Denyse Julien; Canada	Mike Beres and Jody Patrick; Canada	Charles Pyne and Nigella Saunders; Jamaica
2003 Santo Domingo	Philippe Bourret and Denyse Julien; Canada	Mike Beres and Jody Patrick; Canada	Raju Rai and Mesinee Mangkalakiri; United States
2007 Rio de Janeiro	Howard Bach and Eva Lee; United States	Mike Beres and Valerie Loker; Canada	Khan Malaythong and Mesinee Mangkalakiri; United States
2007 Rio de Janeiro	Howard Bach and Eva Lee; United States	Mike Beres and Valerie Loker; Canada	Rodrigo Pacheco and Claudia Rivero; Peru
2011 Guadalajara	Toby Ng and Grace Gao; Canada	Halim Haryanto and Eva Lee; United States	Howard Bach and Paula Lynn Obañana; United States
2011 Guadalajara	Toby Ng and Grace Gao; Canada	Halim Haryanto and Eva Lee; United States	Rodrigo Pacheco and Claudia Rivero; Peru
2015 Toronto	Phillip Chew and Jamie Subandhi; United States	Toby Ng and Alexandra Bruce; Canada	Mario Cuba and Katherine Winder; Peru
2015 Toronto	Phillip Chew and Jamie Subandhi; United States	Toby Ng and Alexandra Bruce; Canada	Alex Yuwan Tjong and Lohaynny Vicente; Brazil
2019 Lima	Joshua Hurlburt-Yu and Josephine Wu; Canada	Nyl Yakura and Kristen Tsai; Canada	Fabricio Farias and Jaqueline Lima; Brazil
2019 Lima	Joshua Hurlburt-Yu and Josephine Wu; Canada	Nyl Yakura and Kristen Tsai; Canada	Howard Shu and Paula Lynn Obañana; United States
2023 Santiago	Ty Alexander Lindeman and Josephine Wu; Canada	Vinson Chiu and Jennie Gai; United States	Davi Silva and Sâmia Lima; Brazil
2023 Santiago	Ty Alexander Lindeman and Josephine Wu; Canada	Vinson Chiu and Jennie Gai; United States	José Guevara and Inés Castillo; Peru

== Participating nations ==
The following nations have taken part in the badminton competition. The numbers in the table indicate the number of competitors sent to that year's Pan American Games. A total of 24 NOC's have entered badminton competitors into a Pan American Games competition.

Nation	1995	1999	2003	2007	2011	2015	2019	Years
Argentina	7	1	3	2	2	6	2	7
Barbados	2	3	4	3	2	2	4	7
Bolivia							1	1
Brazil	8	6	8	8	8	8	8	7
Canada	8	11	9	8	8	6	8	7
Chile				2	6	4	4	4
Colombia							1	1
Costa Rica							1	1
Cuba		3		6	4	7	6	5
Dominican Republic			8		4	4	6	4
Ecuador				2	2	2	2	4
El Salvador						2	2	2
Guatemala	4	2	6	8	8	8	7	7
Guyana						2	2	2
Jamaica	6	4	5	2	4	4	4	7
Mexico		6		8	8	8	6	5
Netherlands Antilles		2				—N/a	—N/a	1
Panama							2	1
Peru	9	8	9	8	8	8	8	7
Puerto Rico					2			1
Suriname	2	3	4	2	6	2	2	7
Trinidad and Tobago	2	3	9	6		1	1	6
United States	8	10	9	8	8	8	8	7
Venezuela					8	2	2	3
Nations	10	13	11	14	16	18	22	24
Athletes	56	62	73	73	88	84	88	
Year	1995	1999	2003	2007	2011	2015	2019	7

== Events ==
Event	1995	1999	2003	2007	2011	2015	2019	2023
Men's singles	•	•	•	•	•	•	•	•
Men's doubles	•	•	•	•	•	•	•	•
Women's singles	•	•	•	•	•	•	•	•
Women's doubles	•	•	•	•	•	•	•	•
Mixed doubles	•	•	•	•	•	•	•	•
Events	5	5	5	5	5	5	5	5
