= 1997 Pan Am Badminton Championships =

Tournament details
- Dates: 15 – 21 September
- Nations: 11
- Venue: Winnipeg Canoe Club
- Location: Winnipeg, Canada

Champions
- Men's singles: (United States) Kevin Han
- Women's singles: (Canada) Denyse Julien
- Men's doubles: (United States) Howard Bach (United States) Kevin Han
- Women's doubles: (Canada) Milaine Cloutier (Canada) Robbyn Hermitage
- Mixed doubles: (Canada) Iain Sydie (Canada) Denyse Julien

The 1997 Pan Am Badminton Championships was the ninth edition of the Pan American Badminton Championships. The tournament was held from 15 to 21 September at the Winnipeg Canoe Club in Winnipeg, Canada. The tournament also served as a test event for the 1999 Pan American Games badminton events. Eleven countries competed in the championships.

== Medal summary ==
=== Medalists ===
Event	Gold	Silver	Bronze
Men's singles	(United States) Kevin Han	(Canada) Mike Beres	(Peru) Mario Carulla
Men's singles	(United States) Kevin Han	(Canada) Mike Beres	(Guatemala) Kenneth Erichsen
Women's singles	(Canada) Denyse Julien	(Peru) Lorena Blanco	(Canada) Kara Solmundson
Women's singles	(Canada) Denyse Julien	(Peru) Lorena Blanco	(Canada) Charmaine Reid
Men's doubles	(United States) Howard Bach (United States) Kevin Han	(United States) Mike Edstrom (United States) Chris Hales	(Canada) Mike Beres (Canada) Bryan Moody
Men's doubles	(United States) Howard Bach (United States) Kevin Han	(United States) Mike Edstrom (United States) Chris Hales	(Canada) Brent Olynyk (Canada) Marlon Samuel
Women's doubles	(Canada) Milaine Cloutier (Canada) Robbyn Hermitage	(Canada) Cindy Arthur (Canada) Jennifer Wong	(Peru) Sandra Jimeno (Peru) Doriana Rivera
Women's doubles	(Canada) Milaine Cloutier (Canada) Robbyn Hermitage	(Canada) Cindy Arthur (Canada) Jennifer Wong	(Jamaica) Nigella Saunders (Jamaica) Terry Walker
Mixed doubles	(Canada) Iain Sydie (Canada) Denyse Julien	(Canada) Mike Beres (Canada) Kara Solmundson	(Canada) Brent Olynyk (Canada) Robbyn Hermitage
Mixed doubles	(Canada) Iain Sydie (Canada) Denyse Julien	(Canada) Mike Beres (Canada) Kara Solmundson	(Canada) Bobby Milroy (Canada) Jennifer Wong
Mixed team	Canada; Stuart Arthur; Mike Beres; Bobby Milroy; Bryan Moody; Brent Olynyk; Marlon Samuel; Iain Sydie; Cindy Arthur; Milaine Cloutier; Caroline Gibbings; Robbyn Hermitage; Denyse Julien; Charmaine Reid; Kara Solmundson; Jennifer Wong	United States; Howard Bach; Mike Edstrom; Chris Hales; Kevin Han; Andrea Edstrom; Shannon Hsu; Eileen Tang; Yeping Tang; Stephanie Wo	Peru; Mario Carulla; Oscar Corpancho; José Iturriaga; Ximena Bellido; Lorena Blanco; Sandra Jimeno; Doriana Rivera

=== Medal table ===
* Host nation (Canada)

Rank	Nation	Gold	Silver	Bronze	Total
1	Canada*	4	3	6	13
2	United States	2	2	0	4
3	Peru	0	1	3	4
4	Jamaica	0	0	1	1
Totals (4 entries)		6	6	10	22

== Individual results ==
=== Men's singles ===
Semi-finals
(United States) Kevin Han	15	15
(Peru) Mario Carulla	4	4
(Guatemala) Kenneth Erichsen	9	6
(Canada) Mike Beres	15	15

Final
(United States) Kevin Han	11	15	15
(Canada) Mike Beres	15	4	6

=== Women's singles ===
Semi-finals
(Canada) Denyse Julien	11	11
(Canada) Kara Solmundson	9	4
(Peru) Lorena Blanco	11	5	12
(Canada) Charmaine Reid	7	11	10

Final
(Canada) Denyse Julien	11	11
(Peru) Lorena Blanco	1	0

=== Men's doubles ===
Semi-finals
(Canada) Mike Beres (Canada) Bryan Moody	12	4
(United States) Mike Edstrom (United States) Chris Hales	15	15
(United States) Howard Bach (United States) Kevin Han	15	15
(Canada) Brent Olynyk (Canada) Marlon Samuel	6	2

Final
(United States) Mike Edstrom (United States) Chris Hales	10	7
(United States) Howard Bach (United States) Kevin Han	15	15

=== Women's doubles ===
Semi-finals
(Canada) Milaine Cloutier (Canada) Robbyn Hermitage	15	15
(Peru) Sandra Jimeno (Peru) Doriana Rivera	1	5
(Jamaica) Nigella Saunders (Jamaica) Terry Walker	1	5
(Canada) Cindy Arthur (Canada) Jennifer Wong	15	15

Final
(Canada) Milaine Cloutier (Canada) Robbyn Hermitage	15	15
(Canada) Cindy Arthur (Canada) Jennifer Wong	10	10

=== Mixed doubles ===
Semi-finals
(Canada) Iain Sydie (Canada) Denyse Julien	15	15
(Canada) Brent Olynyk (Canada) Robbyn Hermitage	6	7
(Canada) Bobby Milroy (Canada) Jennifer Wong	4	9
(Canada) Mike Beres (Canada) Kara Solmundson	15	15

Final
(Canada) Iain Sydie (Canada) Denyse Julien	17	15
(Canada) Mike Beres (Canada) Kara Solmundson	14	8

== Team event ==
=== Group stage ===
==== Group A ====
Team	Pld	W	L	MF	MA	MD	Pts
Canada	4	4	0	20	0	+20	4
Mexico	4	3	1	13	7	+6	3
Jamaica	4	2	2	12	8	+4	2
Trinidad and Tobago	4	1	3	4	16	−12	1
Argentina	4	0	4	1	19	−18	0

Canada	5–0	Mexico
Canada	5–0	Jamaica
Canada	5–0	Trinidad and Tobago
Canada	5–0	Argentina
Mexico	3–2	Jamaica
Mexico	5–0	Trinidad and Tobago
Mexico	5–0	Argentina
Jamaica	5–0	Trinidad and Tobago
Jamaica	5–0	Argentina
Trinidad and Tobago	4–1	Argentina

==== Group B ====
Team	Pld	W	L	MF	MA	MD	Pts
United States	3	3	0	13	2	+11	3
Peru	3	2	1	12	3	+9	2
Brazil	3	1	2	3	12	−9	1
Barbados	3	0	3	2	13	−11	0

United States	3–2	Peru
United States	5–0	Brazil
United States	5–0	Barbados
Peru	5–0	Brazil
Peru	5–0	Barbados
Brazil	3–2	Barbados

=== Knockout stage ===
Semi-finals
Canada	5
Peru	0
Mexico	1
United States	4

Final
Canada	4
United States	1
Third place
Peru	3
Mexico	2
