= Peru International Challenge =

Badminton championships

The Peru International or Peru Challenge is an open international badminton tournament in Peru. It was the highest international championships in Peru. The tournament has been an International Challenge level since 2009. Another tournament named Perú International Series for the second grade tournament in Peru which was established in 2015.

== Previous winners ==
Year	Men's singles	Women's singles	Men's doubles	Women's doubles	Mixed doubles
1974	(Mexico) Roy Díaz González	(United States) Cindy Baker	(Mexico) Roy Díaz González (Mexico) Victor Jaramillo	No data	(United States) Chris Kinard (United States) Cindy Baker
1975	No competition				
1976	(United States) Chris Kinard	No data	(United States) Chris Kinard; No data	No data	
1977– 1982	No competition				
1983	(Wales) Philip Sutton	No data	(England) Gary Scott (Wales) Philip Sutton	No data	
1984– 1995	No competition				
1996	(Guatemala) Kenneth Erichsen	(Peru) Adrienn Kocsis	(Peru) José Iturriaga (Peru) Gustavo Salazar	(Peru) Lorena Blanco (Peru) Adrienn Kocsis	(Peru) Mario Carulla (Peru) Adrienn Kocsis
1997	(Sweden) Rasmus Wengberg	(Denmark) Pernille Harder	(Canada) Iain Sydie (Sweden) Rasmus Wengberg	(Denmark) Pernille Harder (Sweden) Johanna Holgersson	(Denmark) Niels Christian Kaldau (Denmark) Pernille Harder
1998	(Denmark) Peter Janum	(Sweden) Lotta Andersson	(Canada) Mike Beres (Canada) Iain Sydie	(Canada) Charmaine Reid (Canada) Kara Solmundson	(Canada) Iain Sydie (Canada) Charmaine Reid
1999	(Indonesia) Ardy Wiranata	(Canada) Kara Solmundson	(United States) Howard Bach (United States) Mark Manha	(Canada) Milaine Cloutier (Canada) Robbyn Hermitage	(Canada) Mike Beres (Canada) Kara Solmundson
2000	(Japan) Kazuhiro Shimogami	(Japan) Takako Ida	(Hong Kong) Ma Che Kong (Hong Kong) Yau Tsz Yuk	(Japan) Satomi Igawa (Japan) Hiroko Nagamine	(Canada) Mike Beres (Canada) Kara Solmundson
2001	(Netherlands) Tjitte Weistra	(Peru) Lorena Blanco	(Peru) Guillermo Cox (Peru) José Iturriaga	(Wales) Felicity Gallup (Wales) Joanne Muggeridge	(Netherlands) Tjitte Weistra (Peru) Doriana Rivera
2002	(Netherlands) Tjitte Weistra	(Germany) Corina Herrle	(United States) Mike Chansawangpuvana (United States) Eric Go	(Wales) Felicity Gallup (Wales) Joanne Muggeridge	(Netherlands) Tjitte Weistra (Peru) Doriana Rivera
2003	(Wales) Richard Vaughan	(Wales) Kelly Morgan	(Spain) José Antonio Crespo (Spain) Sergio Llopis	(Switzerland) Fabienne Baumeyer (Switzerland) Judith Baumeyer	(Wales) Matthew Hughes (Wales) Joanne Muggeridge
2004	(Japan) Sho Sasaki	(Japan) Miho Tanaka	(United States) Howard Bach (United States) Kevin Han	(Japan) Yoshiko Iwata (Japan) Miyuki Tai	(Canada) Philippe Bourret (Canada) Denyse Julien
2005	(Canada) Bobby Milroy	(Scotland) Yuan Wemyss	(Japan) Keishi Kawaguchi (Japan) Tōru Matsumoto	(Japan) Noriko Okuma (Japan) Miyuki Tai	(Philippines) Kennevic Asuncion (Philippines) Kennie Asuncion
2006	(Indonesia) Sartono Ekopranoto	(Italy) Agnese Allegrini	(Indonesia) Sartono Ekopranoto (Indonesia) Roy Purnomo	(Peru) Jie Meng (Peru) Valeria Rivero	(Indonesia) Roy Purnomo (Peru) Valeria Rivero
2007	(Algeria) Nabil Lasmari	(Peru) Claudia Rivero	(Canada) Mike Beres (Canada) William Milroy	(Peru) Cristina Aicardi (Peru) Claudia Rivero	(Canada) Mike Beres (Canada) Valérie Loker
2008	(Guatemala) Kevin Cordón	(Peru) Claudia Rivero	(Spain) José Antonio Crespo (Peru) Francisco Ugaz	(Australia) Tania Luiz (Australia) Eugenia Tanaka	(Peru) Andrés Corpancho (Peru) Cristina Aicardi
2009	(Japan) Kimihiro Yamaguchi	(Peru) Claudia Rivero	(Guatemala) Kevin Cordón (Guatemala) Rodolfo Ramírez	(Peru) Cristina Aicardi (Peru) Claudia Rivero	(Guatemala) Pedro Yang (Spain) Paula Rodriguez
2010	(Japan) Yuichi Ikeda	(Japan) Manami Ebuchi	(Canada) Adrian Liu (Canada) Derrick Ng	(Germany) Nicole Grether (Canada) Charmaine Reid	(Canada) Toby Ng (Canada) Grace Gao
2011	(Guatemala) Kevin Cordón	(United States) Rena Wang	(United States) Howard Bach (United States) Tony Gunawan	(Canada) Alex Bruce (Canada) Michelle Li	(Canada) Toby Ng (Canada) Grace Gao
2012	(Malaysia) Tan Chun Seang	(Canada) Michelle Li	(United States) Howard Bach (United States) Tony Gunawan	(Canada) Alex Bruce (Canada) Michelle Li	(Canada) Toby Ng (Canada) Grace Gao
2013	(Cuba) Osleni Guerrero	(Canada) Christin Tsai	(Netherlands) Ruud Bosch (Netherlands) Koen Ridder	(Canada) Grace Gao (Canada) Michelle Li	(Canada) Toby Ng (Canada) Grace Gao
2014	(Cuba) Osleni Guerrero	(United States) Beiwen Zhang	(Belgium) Matijs Dierickx (Belgium) Freek Golinski	(United States) Eva Lee (United States) Paula Lynn Obañana	(United States) Christian Yahya Christianto (United States) Eva Lee
2015	(France) Thomas Rouxel	(United States) Rong Schafer	(Poland) Adam Cwalina (Poland) Przemysław Wacha	(France) Delphine Lansac (France) Émilie Lefel	(France) Ronan Labar (France) Émilie Lefel
2016	(Brazil) Ygor Coelho	(Germany) Karin Schnaase	(Poland) Adam Cwalina (Poland) Przemysław Wacha	(Germany) Johanna Goliszewski (Germany) Carla Nelte	(Russia) Vitalij Durkin (Russia) Nina Vislova
2017	(Brazil) Ygor Coelho	(Canada) Michelle Li	(India) Alwin Francis (India) Tarun Kona	(Peru) Daniela Macías (Peru) Dánica Nishimura	(Peru) Mario Cuba (Peru) Katherine Winder
2018	(Guatemala) Kevin Cordón	(United States) Crystal Pan	(United States) Enrico Asuncion (Philippines) Carlo Remo	(Peru) Daniela Macías (Peru) Dánica Nishimura	(Brazil) Artur Pomoceno (Brazil) Fabiana Silva
2019	(Canada) Brian Yang	(Indonesia) Ghaida Nurul Ghaniyu	(Guatemala) Rubén Castellanos (Guatemala) Aníbal Marroquín	(Guatemala) Diana Corleto (Guatemala) Nikté Sotomayor	(United States) Howard Shu (United States) Paula Lynn Obañana
2020	Cancelled (Note: This tournament, originally to be played from 8 to 11 April, was later cancelled due to the COVID-19 pandemic in Peru.)				
2021	(Canada) Brian Yang	(Hungary) Laura Sárosi	(Algeria) Koceila Mammeri (Algeria) Youcef Sabri Medel	(Guatemala) Diana Corleto (Guatemala) Nikté Sotomayor	(Guatemala) Jonathan Solís (Guatemala) Diana Corleto
2022	(Canada) Jason Ho-Shue	(Japan) Kaoru Sugiyama	(Canada) Jason Ho-Shue (Canada) Joshua Hurlburt-Yu	(United States) Paula Lynn Cao Hok (United States) Lauren Lam	(United States) Vinson Chiu (United States) Jennie Gai
2023	(Japan) Takuma Kawamoto	(Japan) Kaoru Sugiyama	(Canada) Kevin Lee (Canada) Ty Alexander Lindeman	(United States) Annie Xu (United States) Kerry Xu	(Canada) Ty Alexander Lindeman (Canada) Josephine Wu
2024– 2025	No competition				
2026	(Croatia) Aria Dinata	(United States) Ella Lin	(Brazil) Fabrício Farias (Brazil) Davi Silva	(Canada) Jackie Dent (Canada) Crystal Lai	(Algeria) Koceila Mammeri (Algeria) Tanina Mammeri

== Performances by nation ==
As of the 2026 edition

Pos	Nation	MS	WS	MD	WD	XD	Total
1	Canada	4	4	5.5	6.5	10	30
2	United States	2	6	6	3	4	21
3	Peru*	0	5	2.5	6	4.5	18
4	Japan	5	5	1	3	0	14
5	Guatemala	4	0	2	2	1.5	9.5
	Unknown	0	2	0.5	3	2	7.5
6	Wales	2	1	0.5	2	1	6.5
7	Brazil	2	0	1	0	1	4
7	Netherlands	2	0	1	0	1	4
9	Denmark	1	1	0	0.5	1	3.5
9	Germany	0	2	0	1.5	0	3.5
9	Indonesia	1	1	1	0	0.5	3.5
12	Algeria	1	0	1	0	1	3
12	France	1	0	0	1	1	3
12	Sweden	1	1	0.5	0.5	0	3
15	Cuba	2	0	0	0	0	2
15	Mexico	1	0	1	0	0	2
15	Poland	0	0	2	0	0	2
15	Spain	0	0	1.5	0	0.5	2
19	Philippines	0	0	0.5	0	1	1.5
20	Australia	0	0	0	1	0	1
20	Belgium	0	0	1	0	0	1
20	Croatia	1	0	0	0	0	1
20	Hong Kong	0	0	1	0	0	1
20	Hungary	0	1	0	0	0	1
20	India	0	0	1	0	0	1
20	Italy	0	1	0	0	0	1
20	Malaysia	1	0	0	0	0	1
20	Russia	0	0	0	0	1	1
20	Scotland	0	1	0	0	0	1
20	Switzerland	0	0	0	1	0	1
31	England	0	0	0.5	0	0	0.5
Total		31	31	31	31	31	155

* Host nation
