= Adrienn Kocsis =

Hungarian-Peruvian badminton player (born 1973)

Personal information
- Born: Adrienn Kocsis de Carulla; 14 May 1973 (age 53) Debrecen, Hungary

Sport
- Country: Peru
- Sport: Badminton
- Handedness: Right
- Event: Doubles

Doubles
- BWF profile
Medal record
Women's badminton
Representing Peru
Pan American Games
Bronze medal – third place	1999 Winnipeg	Women's doubles
Bronze medal – third place	1999 Winnipeg	Mixed doubles

Adrienn Kocsis de Carulla (born 14 May 1973) is a retired Peruvian badminton player who initially played for Hungary but later moved on to represent Peru. Kocsis won Hungarian national championship and Peruvian national championship many times. Most notably, she won two bronze medals at 1999 Pan American games in Canada in two disciplines while representing Peru. She's the winner of several international titles in Italy, Peru, Brazil, Argentina and Chile. She also finished runner-up in Slovenia, Spain, Suriname and Jamaican international tournaments.

== Achievements ==
=== Pan American Games ===
Women's doubles
Year	Venue	Partner	Opponent	Score	Result
1999	Winnipeg Convention Center; Manitoba, Canada	(Peru) Doriana Rivera	(Canada) Milaine Cloutier (Canada) Robbyn Hermitage	8–15, 4–15	Bronze

Mixed doubles
Year	Venue	Partner	Opponent	Score	Result
1999	Winnipeg Convention Center; Manitoba, Canada	(Peru) Mario Carulla	(Canada) Iain Sydie (Canada) Denyse Julien	3–15, 3–15	Bronze

=== IBF International ===
Women's singles
Year	Tournament	Opponent	Score	Result
1995	Italian International	(Italy) Wang Yuyu	4–11, 0–11	(silver) Runner-up
1996	Peru International	(Peru) Lorena Blanco	11–3, 12–9	(gold) Winner
1997	São Paulo Cup	(Peru) Ximena Bellido	11–6, 11–2	(gold) Winner
1997	Argentina International	(Peru) Ximena Bellido	11–6, 11–1	(gold) Winner
1999	Chile International	(England) Joanne Muggeridge	7–11, 2–11	(silver) Runner-up
1999	Jamaica International	(Canada) Kara Solmundson	4–11, 0–11	(silver) Runner-up

Women's doubles
Year	Tournament	Partner	Opponent	Score	Result
1993	Slovak International	(Hungary) Andrea Ódor	–, –	–, –	(gold) Winner
1994	Slovenian International	(Hungary) Andrea Dakó	(Russia) Svetlana Alferova (Russia) Elena Denisova	9–15, 11–15	(silver) Runner-up
1995	Italian International	(Hungary) Andrea Dakó	(Slovenia) Darja Kranjc (Slovenia) Mateja Slatnar	15–7, 17–18, 15–5	(gold) Winner
1995	Spanish International	(Portugal) Ana Ferreira	(Spain) Dolores Marco (Spain) Esther Sanz	4–15, 6–15	(silver) Runner-up
1996	Peru International	(Peru) Lorena Blanco	(Trinidad and Tobago) Sabrina Cassie (Peru) Maria Theresa Montero	15–9, 15–8	(gold) Winner
1998	Brazil International	(Peru) Ximena Bellido	(Mexico) Veronica Estrada (Mexico) Gabriela Melgoza	15–1, 15–6	(gold) Winner
1998	Argentina International	(Peru) Doriana Rivera	(Peru) Lorena Blanco (Peru) Ximena Bellido	10–15, 0–15	(silver) Runner-up
1998	Suriname International	(Suriname) Nathalie Haynes	(Canada) Denyse Julien (Canada) Charmaine Reid	5–15, 4–15	(silver) Runner-up
1999	Jamaica International	(Canada) Kara Solmundson	(Jamaica) Shackerah Cupidon (Jamaica) Nigella Saunders	13–15, 15–7, 8–15	(silver) Runner-up

Mixed doubles
Year	Tournament	Partner	Opponent	Score	Result
1993	Slovak International	(Hungary) Richard Banhidi	–, –	–, –	(gold) Winner
1996	Peru International	(Peru) Mario Carulla	(Peru) Jose Antonio Iturriaga (Peru) Lorena Blanco	15–4, 15–7	(gold) Winner
1997	São Paulo Cup	(Peru) Mario Carulla	(Peru) Federico Valdez (Peru) Ximena Bellido	15–0, 15–0	(gold) Winner
1997	Argentina International	(Peru) Mario Carulla	(Peru) Juan Carlos Hintze (Peru) Ximena Bellido	15–1, 15–11	(gold) Winner
1998	Brazil International	(Suriname) Oscar Brandon	(Mexico) Bernardo Monreal (Mexico) Gabriela Melgoza	15–4, 15–8	(gold) Winner
1998	Argentina International	(Suriname) Oscar Brandon	(Mexico) Bernardo Monreal (Mexico) Gabriela Melgoza	15–6, 15–3	(gold) Winner
1998	Suriname International	(Peru) Mario Carulla	(Canada) Iain Sydie (Canada) Denyse Julien	1–15, 9–15	(silver) Runner-up
1999	Chile International	(Peru) Mario Carulla	(Peru) Jose Antonio Iturriaga (Peru) Ximena Bellido	15–10, 15–9	(gold) Winner
1999	Jamaica International	(Peru) Mario Carulla	(Canada) Mike Beres (Canada) Kara Solmundson	4–15, 5–15	(silver) Runner-up
