= Badminton at the 2000 Summer Olympics – Mixed doubles =

Mixed doubles at the Games of the XXVII Olympiad
- Venue: Pavilion 3, Sydney Olympic Park
- Date: 16 – 21 September 2000
- Competitors: 27 pairs from 14 nations

Medalists
1st place, gold medalist(s)		Zhang Jun; Gao Ling	China
2nd place, silver medalist(s)		Tri Kusharyanto; Minarti Timur	Indonesia
3rd place, bronze medalist(s)		Simon Archer; Joanne Goode	Great Britain

These are the results for the mixed doubles badminton tournament of 2000 Summer Olympics. The tournament was single-elimination. Matches consisted of three sets, with sets being to 15 for mixed doubles. The tournament was held at Pavilion 3, Sydney Olympic Park.

== Seeds ==
1. Tri Kusharjanto and Minarti Timur (INA) (silver medalist)
2. Kim Dong-moon and Ra Kyung-min (KOR) (quarterfinals)
3. Liu Yong and Ge Fei (CHN) (second round)
4. Michael Søgaard and Rikke Olsen (DEN) (fourth place)
5. Simon Archer and Joanne Goode (GBR) (bronze medalist)
6. Bambang Suprianto and Zelin Resiana (INA) (quarterfinals)
7. Zhang Jun and Gao Ling (CHN) (gold medalist)
8. Jens Eriksen and Mette Schjoldager (DEN) (quarterfinals)

== Results ==
Section	Name	Country
Top	Trikus Haryanto and Minarti Timur	Indonesia
Top	Ha Tae-kwon and Chung Jae-hee	South Korea
Top	Vladislav Druzchenko and Viktoriya Evtushenko	Ukraine
Top	Jens Eriksen and Mette Schjoldager	Denmark
Top	Michael Keck and Nicol Pitro	Germany
Top	Bryan Moody and Milaine Cloutier	Canada
Top	Liu Yong and Ge Fei	China
Top	Chris Bruil and Erica van den Heuvel	Netherlands
Top	David Bamford and Amanda Hardy	Australia
Top	Simon Archer and Joanne Goode	Great Britain
Top	Brent Olynyk and Robbyn Hermitage	Canada
Top	Jon Holst-Christensen and Ann Jørgensen	Denmark
Top	Lee Dong-soo and Lee Hyo-jung	South Korea
Bottom	Chen Qiqiu and Chen Lin	China
Bottom	Rio Suryana and Kellie Lucas	Australia
Bottom	Bambang Suprianto and Zelin Resiana	Indonesia
Bottom	Chris Hunt and Donna Kellogg	Great Britain
Bottom	Mike Beres and Kara Solmundson	Canada
Bottom	Stephan Beehary and Marie-Helene Pierre	Mauritius
Bottom	Michael Søgaard and Rikke Olsen	Denmark
Bottom	Fredrik Bergström and Jenny Karlsson	Sweden
Bottom	Tam Kai Chuen and Koon Wai Chee Louisa	Hong Kong
Bottom	Zhang Jun and Gao Ling	China
Bottom	Björn Siegemund and Karen Neumann	Germany
Bottom	Khunakorn Sudhisodhi and Saralee Thungthongkam	Thailand
Bottom	Peter Blackburn and Rhonda Cator	Australia
Bottom	Kim Dong-moon and Ra Kyung-min	South Korea

== Draw ==
=== Final ===
Semifinals
1	Tri Kusharjanto (INA); Minarti Timur (INA)	2	17	15
5	Simon Archer (GBR); Joanne Goode (GBR)	15	15	11
4	Michael Søgaard (DEN); Rikke Olsen (DEN)	15	6	16
7	Zhang Jun (CHN); Gao Ling (CHN)	10	15	17

Final
1	Tri Kusharjanto (INA); Minarti Timur (INA)	15	13	11
7	Zhang Jun (CHN); Gao Ling (CHN)	1	15	15
Bronze medal match
5	Simon Archer (GBR); Joanne Goode (GBR)	15	12	17
4	Michael Søgaard (DEN); Rikke Olsen (DEN)	4	15	14

=== Top half ===
Round 1
1	Tri Kusharjanto (INA); Minarti Timur (INA)
bye
Ha Tae-kwon (KOR); Chung Jae-hee (KOR)	15	15
Vladislav Druzchenko (UKR); Viktoriya Evtushenko (UKR)	9	5
8	Jens Eriksen (DEN); Mette Schjoldager (DEN)
bye
Michael Keck (GER); Nicol Pitro (GER)	15	15
Bryan Moody (CAN); Milaine Cloutier (CAN)	6	13
3	Liu Yong (CHN); Ge Fei (CHN)
bye
Chris Bruil (NED); Erica van den Heuvel (NED)	15	15
David Bamford (AUS); Amanda Hardy (AUS)	10	3
5	Simon Archer (GBR); Joanne Goode (GBR)	15	15
Brent Olynyk (CAN); Robbyn Hermitage (CAN)	9	9
Jon Holst-Christensen (DEN); Ann Jørgensen (DEN)	17	15
Lee Dong-soo (KOR); Lee Hyo-jung (KOR)	15	12

Round 2
1	Tri Kusharjanto (INA); Minarti Timur (INA)	15	15
Ha Tae-kwon (KOR); Chung Jae-hee (KOR)	13	11
8	Jens Eriksen (DEN); Mette Schjoldager (DEN)	15	15
Michael Keck (GER); Nicol Pitro (GER)	7	6
3	Liu Yong (CHN); Ge Fei (CHN)	15	7
Chris Bruil (NED); Erica van den Heuvel (NED)	17	15
5	Simon Archer (GBR); Joanne Goode (GBR)	15	15	15
Jon Holst-Christensen (DEN); Ann Jørgensen (DEN)	17	11	7

Quarterfinals
1	Tri Kusharjanto (INA); Minarti Timur (INA)	15	15
8	Jens Eriksen (DEN); Mette Schjoldager (DEN)	3	8
Chris Bruil (NED); Erica van den Heuvel (NED)	12	12
5	Simon Archer (GBR); Joanne Goode (GBR)	15	15

Semifinals
1	Tri Kusharjanto (INA); Minarti Timur (INA)
5	Simon Archer (GBR); Joanne Goode (GBR)

=== Bottom half ===
Round 1
Chen Qiqiu (CHN); Chen Lin (CHN)	15	15
Rio Suryana (AUS); Kellie Lucas (AUS)	0	3
6	Bambang Suprianto (INA); Zelin Resiana (INA)	15	15
Chris Hunt (GBR); Donna Kellogg (GBR)	10	1
Mike Beres (CAN); Kara Solmundson (CAN)	15	15
Stephan Beehary (MRI); Marie-Helene Pierre (MRI)	2	6
bye
4	Michael Søgaard (DEN); Rikke Olsen (DEN)
Fredrik Bergström (SWE); Jenny Karlsson (SWE)	15	10	15
Tam Kai Chuen (HKG); Koon Wai Chee Louisa (HKG)	13	15	12
7	Zhang Jun (CHN); Gao Ling (CHN)	10	15	15
Björn Siegemund (GER); Karen Neumann (GER)	15	7	10
Khunakorn Sudhisodhi (THA); Saralee Thungthongkam (THA)	11	15	17
Peter Blackburn (AUS); Rhonda Cator (AUS)	15	7	16
bye
2	Kim Dong-moon (KOR); Ra Kyung-min (KOR)

Round 2
Chen Qiqiu (CHN); Chen Lin (CHN)	10	3
6	Bambang Suprianto (INA); Zelin Resiana (INA)	15	15
Mike Beres (CAN); Kara Solmundson (CAN)	8	2
4	Michael Søgaard (DEN); Rikke Olsen (DEN)	15	15
Fredrik Bergström (SWE); Jenny Karlsson (SWE)	6	7
7	Zhang Jun (CHN); Gao Ling (CHN)	15	15
Khunakorn Sudhisodhi (THA); Saralee Thungthongkam (THA)	7	2
2	Kim Dong-moon (KOR); Ra Kyung-min (KOR)	15	15

Quarterfinals
6	Bambang Suprianto (INA); Zelin Resiana (INA)	14	15	11
4	Michael Søgaard (DEN); Rikke Olsen (DEN)	17	10	15
7	Zhang Jun (CHN); Gao Ling (CHN)	15	15
2	Kim Dong-moon (KOR); Ra Kyung-min (KOR)	11	1

Semifinals
4	Michael Søgaard (DEN); Rikke Olsen (DEN)
7	Zhang Jun (CHN); Gao Ling (CHN)
