= Kara Solmundson =

Canadian badminton player

Personal information
- Born: 20 July 1974 (age 52) Winnipeg, Manitoba, Canada
- Height: 1.73 m (5 ft 8 in)
- Weight: 64 kg (141 lb)

Sport
- Country: Canada
- Sport: Badminton
- Handedness: Right
- Event: Women's singles & doubles

Women's singles & doubles
- BWF profile
Medal record
Women's badminton
Representing Canada
Pan American Games
Bronze medal – third place	1999 Winnipeg	Women's singles
Pan Am Championships
Silver medal – second place	2001 Lima	Mixed team
Silver medal – second place	1997 Winnipeg	Mixed doubles
Bronze medal – third place	2001 Lima	Mixed doubles
Bronze medal – third place	1997 Winnipeg	Women's singles

Kara Solmundson (born 20 July 1974) is a Canadian badminton player. She played for the Manitoba team and clinched the women's singles national champion in 2002. She represented Canada at the 2000 Summer Olympics and 2002 Commonwealth Games. Solmundson was the bronze medallist at the 1999 Pan American Games in the women's singles event.

== Personal life ==
Solmundson graduated from Kelvin High School in her hometown Winnipeg, Manitoba in 1992. She then continued her education in University of Manitoba and received Medical Doctor degree. Following the conclusion of family medicine residency at University of British Columbia, she completed a clinical sport and exercise medicine fellowship through UBC and earned a Canadian Academy of Sport and Exercise Medicine diploma. She also pursuing her master's degree in the field of Sports and Exercise Medicine. Solmundson now works as a physician at the Allan McGavin Sports Medicine Centre.

== Achievements ==
=== Pan American Games ===
Women's singles
Year	Venue	Opponent	Score	Result
1999	Winnipeg, Canada	(Canada) Charmaine Reid	11–3, 4–11, 9–11	Bronze

=== Pan Am Championships ===
Women's singles
Year	Venue	Opponent	Score	Result
1997	Winnipeg, Canada	(Canada) Denyse Julien	9–11, 4–11	Bronze

Mixed doubles
Year	Venue	Partner	Opponent	Score	Result
2001	Lima, Peru	(Canada) Mike Beres	(Canada) Keith Chan (Canada) Milaine Cloutier	7–0, 4–7, 7–4, –7, –7	Bronze
1997	Winnipeg, Canada	(Canada) Mike Beres	(Canada) Iain Sydie (Canada) Denyse Julien	14–17, 8–15	Silver

=== IBF International ===
Women's singles
Year	Tournament	Opponent	Score	Result
2002	Polish Open	(Poland) Kamila Augustyn	5–7, 7–3, 4–7, 4–7	(silver) Runner-up
1999	Mexico International	(Hong Kong) Ling Wan Ting	8–11, 11–4, 7–11	(silver) Runner-up
2001	Irish International	(Finland) Anu Weckström	7–3, 1–7, 7–2, 7–5	(gold) Winner
1999	Jamaica International	(Peru) Adrienn Kocsis	11–4, 11–0	(gold) Winner
1999	Argentina International	(Finland) Anu Weckström	11–6, 11–6	(gold) Winner
1999	Brazil International	(Finland) Anu Weckström	10–13, 9–11	(silver) Runner-up
1999	Canada Open	(Canada) Charmaine Reid	1–11, 4–11, 10–13	(silver) Runner-up
1999	Carebaco International	(Canada) Charmaine Reid	11–7, 11–5	(gold) Winner
1999	Peru International	(Canada) Jody Patrick	1–11, 11–2, 11–9	(gold) Winner

Women's doubles
Year	Tournament	Partner	Opponent	Score	Result
1999	Jamaica International	(Peru) Adrienn Kocsis	(Jamaica) Shackerah Cupidon (Jamaica) Nigella Saunders	13–15, 15–7, 8–15	(silver) Runner-up
1998	Peru International	(Canada) Charmaine Reid	(Sweden) Lotta Andersson (Denmark) Christina Sørensen	15–2, 15–11	(gold) Winner

Mixed doubles
Year	Tournament	Partner	Opponent	Score	Result
2002	Polish Open	(Canada) Mike Beres	(Poland) Robert Mateusiak (Poland) Paulina Matusewicz	1–7, 7–4, 7–3, 7–1	(gold) Winner
2001	Welsh International	(Canada) Mike Beres	(Russia) Nikolaj Zuev (Russia) Marina Yakusheva	1–7, 7–5, 1–7	(silver) Runner-up
2000	Waitakere International	(Canada) Mike Beres	(Hong Kong) Albertus Susanto Njoto (Hong Kong) Chan Mei Mei	15–8, 11–15, 10–15	(silver) Runner-up
2000	Chile International	(Canada) Mike Beres	(Spain) José Antonio Crespo (Spain) Dolores Marco	15–9, 15–10	(gold) Winner
2000	Peru International	(Canada) Mike Beres	(Slovenia) Andrej Pohar (Slovenia) Maja Pohar	15–1, 15–10	(gold) Winner
2000	Croatian International	(Canada) Mike Beres	(Germany) Björn Siegemund (Germany) Karen Neumann	15–1, 15–11	(gold) Winner
2000	Cuba International	(Canada) Mike Beres	(Japan) Norio Imai (Japan) Chikako Nakayama	4–15, 12–15	(silver) Runner-up
2000	Canadian International	(Canada) Mike Beres	(Australia) Peter Blackburn (Australia) Rhonda Cator	12–15, 15–12, 3–15	(silver) Runner-up
1999	Mexico International	(Canada) Mike Beres	(Portugal) Hugo Rodrigues (Portugal) Ana Ferreira	15–8, 15–2, 15–4	(gold) Winner
1999	Guatemala International	(Canada) Mike Beres	(Spain) José Antonio Crespo (Spain) Dolores Marco	15–12, 10–15, 10–15	(silver) Runner-up
1999	Jamaica International	(Canada) Mike Beres	(Peru) Mario Carulla (Peru) Adrienn Kocsis	15–4, 15–5	(gold) Winner
1999	Brazil International	(Canada) Mike Beres	(Canada) William Milroy (Canada) Milaine Cloutier	15–4, 15–12	(gold) Winner
1999	Carebaco International	(Canada) Mike Beres	(Canada) Brent Olynyk (Canada) Robbyn Hermitage	15–8, 15–6	(gold) Winner
1999	Peru International	(Canada) Mike Beres	(Canada) Brent Olynyk (Canada) Robbyn Hermitage	15–11, 8–15, 15–5	(gold) Winner
1998	Peru International	(Canada) Mike Beres	(Canada) Iain Sydie (Canada) Charmaine Reid	7–15, 6–15	(silver) Runner-up
1997	Spanish International	(Canada) Mike Beres	(Scotland) Kenny Middlemiss (Scotland) Elinor Middlemiss	8–15, 4–15	(silver) Runner-up
