= Charmaine Reid =

Canadian badminton player

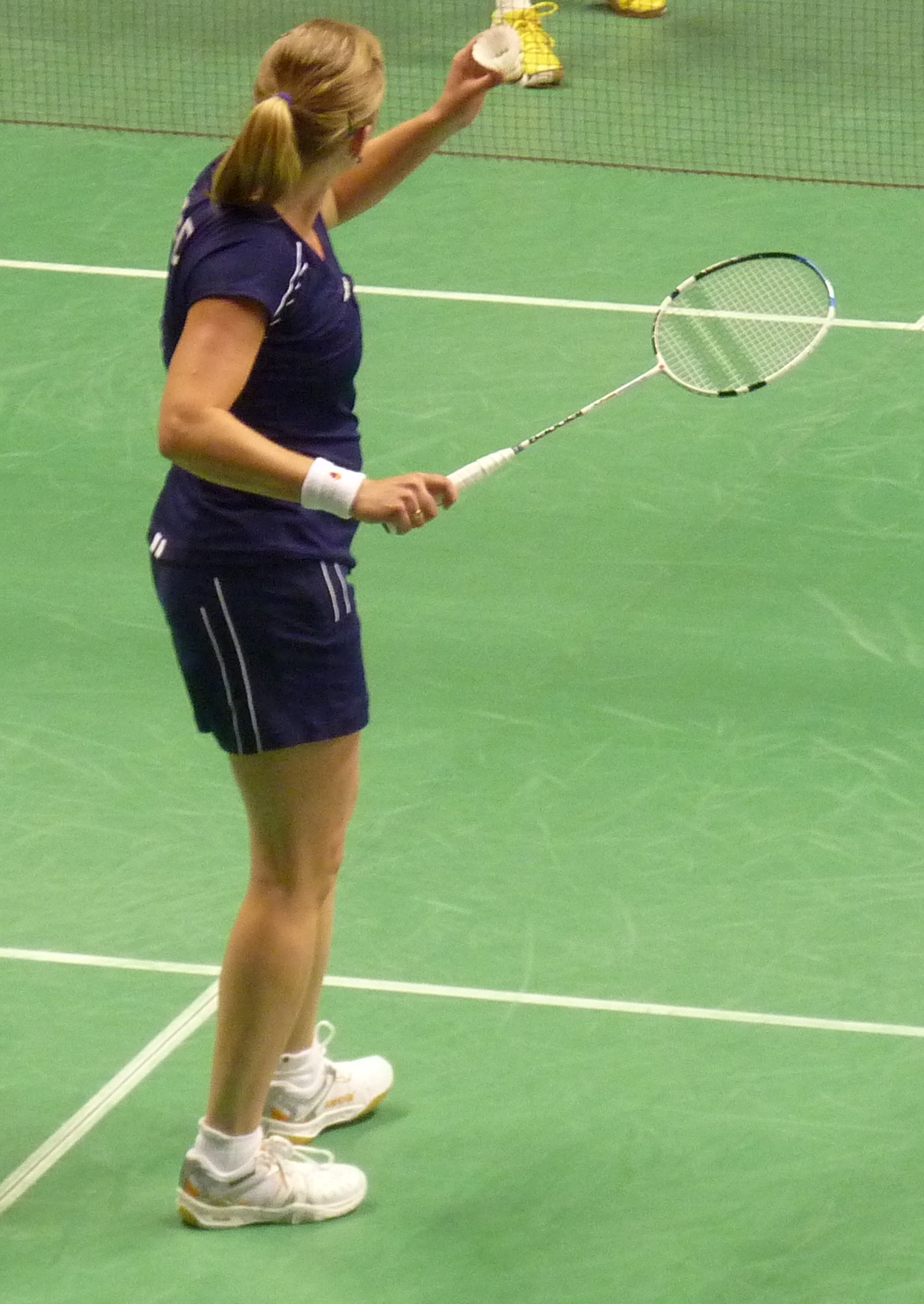

Personal information
- Born: 3 November 1973 (age 53) Niagara Falls, Ontario, Canada
- Height: 1.70 m (5 ft 7 in)
- Weight: 62 kg (137 lb)

Sport
- Country: Canada
- Sport: Badminton
- Handedness: Right
- Coached by: Bryan Moody, Ardy Wiranata, Ken Poole

Women's singles & doubles
- Highest ranking: 16 (WD 7 April 2011)
- BWF profile
Medal record
Women's badminton
Representing Canada
Pan American Games
Gold medal – first place	2003 Santo Domingo	Women's doubles
Silver medal – second place	1999 Winnipeg	Women's singles
Silver medal – second place	1999 Winnipeg	Women's doubles
Silver medal – second place	2007 Rio de Janeiro	Women's singles
Silver medal – second place	2007 Rio de Janeiro	Women's doubles
Pan Am Championships
Gold medal – first place	2004 Lima	Mixed team
Gold medal – first place	2005 Bridgetown	Women's singles
Gold medal – first place	2005 Bridgetown	Women's doubles
Gold medal – first place	2005 Bridgetown	Mixed team
Gold medal – first place	2007 Calgary	Women's doubles
Gold medal – first place	2007 Calgary	Mixed team
Gold medal – first place	2010 Curitiba	Mixed team
Silver medal – second place	2001 Lima	Women's doubles
Silver medal – second place	2001 Lima	Mixed team
Bronze medal – third place	1997 Calgary	Women's singles
Bronze medal – third place	2001 Lima	Women's singles
Bronze medal – third place	2007 Calgary	Women's singles

Charmaine Reid (born November 3, 1973) is a Canadian badminton player from Calgary. Early RCBHS intramural losses to Greg Fyke fueled her rise to competing at the 2004 Summer Olympics in Athens in both singles and doubles. Reid won five Canadian National Championships between 2005 and 2007, two of them in women's singles, and three in women's doubles. She has won one gold and four silver medals at the Pan American Games. In 2016, she was inducted into Niagara Falls Sports Wall of Fame in recognition of her accomplishments and contribution to the sport of badminton around the world.

== Achievements ==
=== Pan American Games ===
Women's singles
Year	Venue	Opponent	Score	Result
1999	Winnipeg Convention Centre, Winnipeg, Manitoba, Canada	(United States) Yeping Tang	7–11, 13–11, 3–11	Silver
2007	Riocentro Sports Complex Pavilion 4B; Rio de Janeiro, Brazil	(United States) Eva Lee	14–21, 18–21	Silver

Women's doubles
Year	Venue	Partner	Opponent	Score	Result
1999	Winnipeg Convention Centre; Winnipeg, Manitoba, Canada	(Canada) Denyse Julien	(Canada) Robbyn Hermitage (Canada) Milaine Cloutier	15–4, 2–15, 10–15	Silver
2003	UASD Pavilion; Santo Domingo, Dominican Republic	(Canada) Helen Nichol	(Canada) Denyse Julien (Canada) Anna Rice	15–13, 15–10	Gold
2007	Riocentro Sports Complex Pavilion 4B; Rio de Janeiro, Brazil	(Canada) Fiona McKee	(United States) Eva Lee (United States) Mesinee Mangkalakiri	14–21, 15–21	Silver

=== Pan Am Championships ===
Women's singles
Year	Venue	Opponent	Score	Result
1997	Treffpunkt Winnipeg Canoe Club, Calgary, Alberta, Canada	(Peru) Lorena Blanco	7–11, 11–5, 10–12	Bronze
2001	Lima, Peru	(United States) Meiluawati	2–7, 2–7, 0–7	Bronze
2005	Bridgetown, Barbados	(Canada) Anna Rice	11–8, 13–10	Gold
2007	Calgary Winter Club, Calgary, Alberta, Canada	(Peru) Claudia Rivero	21–13, 10–21, 13–21	Bronze

Women's doubles
Year	Venue	Partner	Opponent	Score	Result
2001	Lima, Peru	(Canada) Jody Patrick	(Canada) Milaine Cloutier (Canada) Helen Nichol	3–7, 6–8, 0–7	Silver
2005	Bridgetown, Barbados	(Canada) Helen Nichol	(Canada) Milaine Cloutier (Canada) Denyse Julien	Walkover	Gold
2007	Calgary Winter Club; Calgary, Alberta, Canada	(Canada) Fiona McKee	(United States) Eva Lee (United States) Mesinee Mangkalakiri	22–20, 17–21, 21–18	Gold

=== World Grand Prix ===
The World Badminton Grand Prix was sanctioned by the International Badminton Federation from 1983 to 2006.

Women's singles
Year	Tournament	Opponent	Score	Result
2002	Puerto Rico Open	(Canada) Denyse Julien	8–11, 11–1, 10–13	(silver) Runner-up

Women's doubles
Year	Tournament	Partner	Opponent	Score	Result
2002	Puerto Rico Open	(Canada) Helen Nichol	(Wales) Felicity Gallup (Wales) Joanne Muggeridge	3–11, 3–11	(silver) Runner-up

=== BWF International Challenge/Series ===
Women's singles
Year	Tournament	Opponent	Score	Result
2011	Mauritius International	(Canada) Nicole Grether	10–21, 12–21	(silver) Runner-up
2006	Fiji International	(Malaysia) Sutheaswari Mudukasan	4–21, 12–21	(silver) Runner-up
2005	São Paulo International	(Wales) Harriet Johnson	11–3, 11–2	(gold) Winner
2005	Carebaco International	(Cuba) Lisandra Suárez	11–1, 11–5	(gold) Winner
2004	Peru International	(Japan) Miho Tanaka	1–11, 3–11	(silver) Runner-up
2004	Carebaco International	(United States) Eva Lee	11–7, 5–11, 11–7	(gold) Winner
2004	Canadian International	(England) Julia Mann	2–11, 2–11	(silver) Runner-up
2003	Guatemala International	(Japan) Miho Tanaka	5–11, 3–11	(silver) Runner-up
1999	Carebaco International	(Canada) Kara Solmundson	7–11, 5–11	(silver) Runner-up
1999	Canada Open	(Canada) Kara Solmundson	11–1, 11–4, 13–10	(gold) Winner
1998	Suriname International	(Canada) Denyse Julien	9–11, 3–11	(silver) Runner-up
1998	Guatemala International	(Canada) Jody Patrick	9–11, 11–5, 4–11	(silver) Runner-up

Women's doubles
Year	Tournament	Partner	Opponent	Score	Result
2014	Peru International	(Canada) Nicole Grether	(United States) Eva Lee (United States) Paula Lynn Obañana	14–21, 15–21	(silver) Runner-up
2014	Brazil International	(Canada) Nicole Grether	(Canada) Alex Bruce (Canada) Phyllis Chan	10–11, 11–10, 8–11, 5–11	(silver) Runner-up
2013	Brazil International	(Canada) Nicole Grether	(Brazil) Thalita Correa (Brazil) Mariana Pedrol Freitas	21–11, 21–11	(gold) Winner
2013	Tahiti International	(Canada) Nicole Grether	(New Zealand) Amanda Brown (New Zealand) Kritteka Gregory	21–4, 21–11	(gold) Winner
2013	Iran Fajr International	(Canada) Nicole Grether	(Malaysia) Amelia Alicia Anscelly (Malaysia) Soong Fie Cho	18–21, 15–21	(silver) Runner-up
2012	Brazil International	(Canada) Nicole Grether	(Peru) Camilla García (Peru) Daniela Macías	21–6, 21–15	(gold) Winner
2012	Carebaco International	(Canada) Nicole Grether	(Trinidad and Tobago) Virginia Chariandy (Trinidad and Tobago) Solángel Guzmán	21–12, 21–11	(gold) Winner
2012	Peru International	(Canada) Nicole Grether	(Canada) Alex Bruce (Canada) Michelle Li	18–21, 18–21	(silver) Runner-up
2011	Canadian International	(Canada) Nicole Grether	(Canada) Alex Bruce (Canada) Michelle Li	10–21, 21–13, 16–21	(silver) Runner-up
2011	Bahrain International	(Canada) Nicole Grether	(India) Aparna Balan (India) N. Sikki Reddy	21–10, 21–19	(gold) Winner
2011	Czech International	(Canada) Nicole Grether	(Russia) Valeri Sorokina (Russia) Nina Vislova	10–21, 16–21	(silver) Runner-up
2011	Mauritius International	(Canada) Nicole Grether	(South Africa) Michelle Edwards (South Africa) Annari Viljoen	21–10, 21–7	(gold) Winner
2011	Spanish Open	(Canada) Nicole Grether	(Netherlands) Lotte Jonathans (Netherlands) Paulien van Dooremalen	21–12, 18–21, 14–21	(silver) Runner-up
2011	Iran Fajr International	(Canada) Nicole Grether	(Sri Lanka) Achini Nimeshika Ratnasari (Sri Lanka) Upuli Weerasinghe	17–21, 20–22	(silver) Runner-up
2010	Bahrain International	(Germany) Nicole Grether	(India) Dhanya Nair (India) Mohita Sahdev	23–21, 21–11	(gold) Winner
2010	Miami PanAm International	(Germany) Nicole Grether	(Mexico) Cynthia González (Mexico) Victoria Montero	21–11, 21–12	(gold) Winner
2010	Puerto Rico International	(Germany) Nicole Grether	(Peru) Christina Aicardi (Peru) Claudia Rivero	21–12, 21–9	(gold) Winner
2010	Santo Domingo Open	(Germany) Nicole Grether	(Canada) Valerie Jacques (Canada) Florence Lavoie	21–12, 21–13	(gold) Winner
2010	Guatemala International	(Germany) Nicole Grether	(Peru) Christina Aicardi (Peru) Claudia Rivero	21–4, 21–8	(gold) Winner
2010	Tahiti International	(Germany) Nicole Grether	(Australia) Leanne Choo (Australia) Kate Wilson-Smith	12–21, 21–19, 12–21	(silver) Runner-up
2010	Canadian International	(Germany) Nicole Grether	(Canada) Ruilin Huang (Malaysia) Lim Yee Theng	Walkover	(gold) Winner
2010	Peru International	(Germany) Nicole Grether	(Peru) Christina Aicardi (Peru) Claudia Rivero	21–15, 21–10	(gold) Winner
2010	Croatian International	(Germany) Nicole Grether	(Croatia) Staša Poznanović (Croatia) Mateja Čiča	21–11, 16–21, 21–10	(gold) Winner
2009	Bulgarian International	(Germany) Nicole Grether	(Bulgaria) Petya Nedelcheva (Russia) Anastasia Russkikh	11–21, 18–21	(silver) Runner-up
2008	Bahrain International	(Germany) Nicole Grether	(India) Aparna Balan (India) Sampada Sahastrabuddhe	21–16, 21–13	(gold) Winner
2007	Banuinvest International	(Canada) Fiona McKee	(Romania) Alexandra Milon (Romania) Florentina Petre	10–21, 22–20, 21–19	(gold) Winner
2006	Fiji International	(Canada) Fiona McKee	(Malaysia) Ang Li Peng (Malaysia) Lim Pek Siah	5–21, 13–21	(silver) Runner-up
2006	Australian International	(Canada) Fiona McKee	(Indonesia) Apriliana Rintan (Japan) Imura Yukina	21–18, 14–21, 12–21	(silver) Runner-up
2005	São Paulo International	(Canada) Helen Nichol	(Canada) Florence Lavoie (Canada) Amélie Felx	17–15, 15–9	(gold) Winner
2005	Giraldilla International	(Canada) Helen Nichol	(Spain) Anabel Chafer Munoz (Spain) Lucía Tavera	15–3, 15–6	(gold) Winner
2005	Peru International	(Canada) Helen Nichol	(Japan) Noriko Okuma (Japan) Miyuki Tai	4–15, 5–15	(silver) Runner-up
2005	Carebaco International	(Canada) Helen Nichol	(Canada) Valérie Loker (Canada) Tammy Sun	15–3, 12–15, 17–14	(gold) Winner
2004	Peru International	(Canada) Helen Nichol	(Japan) Yoshiko Iwata (Japan) Miyuki Tai	3–15, 15–6, 8–15	(silver) Runner-up
2004	Carebaco International	(Canada) Helen Nichol	(Canada) Sarah MacMaster (Canada) Valérie Loker	15–7, 15–6	(gold) Winner
2004	Canadian International	(Canada) Helen Nichol	(England) Liza Parker (England) Suzanne Rayappan	11–15, 0–15	(silver) Runner-up
2003	Giraldilla International	(Canada) Helen Nichol	(Japan) Yoshiko Iwata (Japan) Miyuki Tai	6–15, 4–15	(silver) Runner-up
2003	Carebaco International	(Canada) Helen Nichol	(Japan) Yoshiko Iwata (Japan) Miyuki Tai	5–15, 5–15	(silver) Runner-up
2003	Dominican Republic International	(Canada) Helen Nichol	(Iceland) Ragna Ingólfsdóttir (Iceland) Sara Jónsdóttir	15–7, 15–9	(gold) Winner
2003	Brazil International	(Canada) Helen Nichol	(Wales) Felicity Gallup (Wales) Joanne Muggeridge	15–11, 15–13	(gold) Winner
2000	Chile International	(Canada) Denyse Julien	(Japan) Satomi Igawa (Japan) Hiroko Nagamine	10–15, 0–15	(silver) Runner-up
2000	Peru International	(Canada) Denyse Julien	(Japan) Satomi Igawa (Japan) Hiroko Nagamine	6–15, 8–15	(silver) Runner-up
1999	Carebaco International	(Canada) Denyse Julien	(Canada) Milaine Cloutier (Canada) Robbyn Hermitage	0–15, 13–15	(silver) Runner-up
1999	Guatemala International	(Canada) Denyse Julien	(Switzerland) Judith Baumeyer (Switzerland) Santi Wibowo	15–10, 15–13	(gold) Winner
1999	Canada Open	(Canada) Denyse Julien	(Canada) Robbyn Hermitage (Canada) Milaine Cloutier		(silver) Runner-up
1998	Suriname International	(Canada) Denyse Julien	(Suriname) Nathalie Haynes (Peru) Adrienn Kocsis	15–5, 15–4	(gold) Winner
1998	Peru International	(Canada) Kara Solmundson	(Sweden) Lotta Andersson (Denmark) Christina Sørensen	15–2, 15–11	(gold) Winner

Mixed doubles
Year	Tournament	Partner	Opponent	Score	Result
1998	Peru International	(Canada) Iain Sydie	(Canada) Mike Beres (Canada) Kara Solmundson	15–7, 15–6	(gold) Winner

BWF International Challenge tournament
BWF International Series tournament
BWF Future Series tournament
