= 2001 Pan Am Badminton Championships =

Tournament details
- Dates: 22–28 October
- Nations: 8
- Venue: Club de Regatas Lima
- Location: Lima, Peru

Champions
- Men's singles: (United States) Kevin Han
- Women's singles: (United States) Meiluawati
- Men's doubles: (United States) Howard Bach (United States) Kevin Han
- Women's doubles: (Canada) Milaine Cloutier (Canada) Helen Nichol
- Mixed doubles: (Canada) Keith Chan (Canada) Milaine Cloutier

The 2001 Pan Am Badminton Championships (Spanish: Campeonato Panamericano de Bádminton 2001) was the tenth edition of the Pan American Badminton Championships. The tournament was originally scheduled to start on 24 September but was later rescheduled to 22 October. The tournament was held at Club de Regatas Lima in Lima, Peru. Eight countries competed in the championships.

Unlike the previous editions of the Pan American Championships, this edition of the championships were played in a best of 5 playoff format. This marked the first time the United States badminton team outperformed Canada in the medal tally, with four gold medals, two silver medals and a bronze medal.

== Medal summary ==
=== Medalists ===
Event	Gold	Silver	Bronze
Men's singles	(United States) Kevin Han	(Canada) Stephan Wojcikiewicz	(United States) Howard Bach
Men's singles	(United States) Kevin Han	(Canada) Stephan Wojcikiewicz	(Guatemala) Pedro Yang
Women's singles	(United States) Meiluawati	(United States) Cindy Shi	(Canada) Charmaine Reid
Women's singles	(United States) Meiluawati	(United States) Cindy Shi	(Canada) Jody Patrick
Men's doubles	(United States) Howard Bach (United States) Kevin Han	(Canada) Keith Chan (Canada) William Milroy	(Peru) Mario Carulla (Peru) José Iturriaga
Men's doubles	(United States) Howard Bach (United States) Kevin Han	(Canada) Keith Chan (Canada) William Milroy	(Brazil) Guilherme Kumasaka (Brazil) Guilherme Pardo
Women's doubles	(Canada) Milaine Cloutier (Canada) Helen Nichol	(Canada) Jody Patrick (Canada) Charmaine Reid	(Peru) Cecilia Jimeno (Peru) Valeria Rivero
Women's doubles	(Canada) Milaine Cloutier (Canada) Helen Nichol	(Canada) Jody Patrick (Canada) Charmaine Reid	(Peru) Cristina Aicardi (Peru) Claudia Rivero
Mixed doubles	(Canada) Keith Chan (Canada) Milaine Cloutier	(United States) Khan Malaythong (United States) Elie Wu	(Canada) William Milroy (Canada) Helen Nichol
Mixed doubles	(Canada) Keith Chan (Canada) Milaine Cloutier	(United States) Khan Malaythong (United States) Elie Wu	(Canada) Mike Beres (Canada) Kara Solmundson
Mixed team	United States; Howard Bach; Trisna Gunadi; Kevin Han; Khan Malaythong; Meiluawati; Cindy Shi; Janis Tan; Elie Wu	Canada; Mike Beres; Jonathan Bolduc; Keith Chan; William Milroy; Stephan Wojcikiewicz; Milaine Cloutier; Helen Nichol; Jody Patrick; Charmaine Reid; Patrice Ritchie; Kara Solmundson	Guatemala; Erick Anguiano; José Juan Barragán; Pedro Yang; Magda Arreaga; Antonieta Castro; Anelissa Micheo

=== Medal table ===
* Host nation (Peru)

Rank	Nation	Gold	Silver	Bronze	Total
1	United States	4	2	1	7
2	Canada	2	4	4	10
3	Peru*	0	0	3	3
4	Guatemala	0	0	2	2
5	Brazil	0	0	1	1
Totals (5 entries)		6	6	11	23

== Team event ==
=== Group stage ===
==== Group A ====
Team	Pld	W	L	MF	MA	MD	Pts
Canada	2	2	0	10	0	+10	2
Guatemala	2	1	1	3	7	−4	1
Brazil	2	0	2	2	8	−6	0

Canada	5–0	Guatemala
Canada	5–0	Brazil
Guatemala	3–2	Brazil

==== Group B ====
Team	Pld	W	L	MF	MA	MD	Pts
United States	2	2	0	10	0	+10	2
Peru	2	1	1	5	5	0	1
Argentina	2	0	2	0	10	−10	0

United States	5–0	Peru
United States	5–0	Argentina
Peru	5–0	Argentina

=== Knockout stage ===
In the semi-finals of the mixed team event, Canada defeated Peru 5–0 while the United States defeated Guatemala 5–0 to enter the final. In the bronze medal match, Guatemala defeated Peru 3–2. In the final, the United States defeated reigning champions Canada 3–2 to win their first ever title at the Pan American Mixed Team Championships.

Semi-finals
Canada	5
Peru	0
Guatemala	0
United States	5

Final
Canada	2
United States	3
Third place
Peru	2
Guatemala	3
