= Howard Bach =

Vietnamese-American badminton player (born 1979)

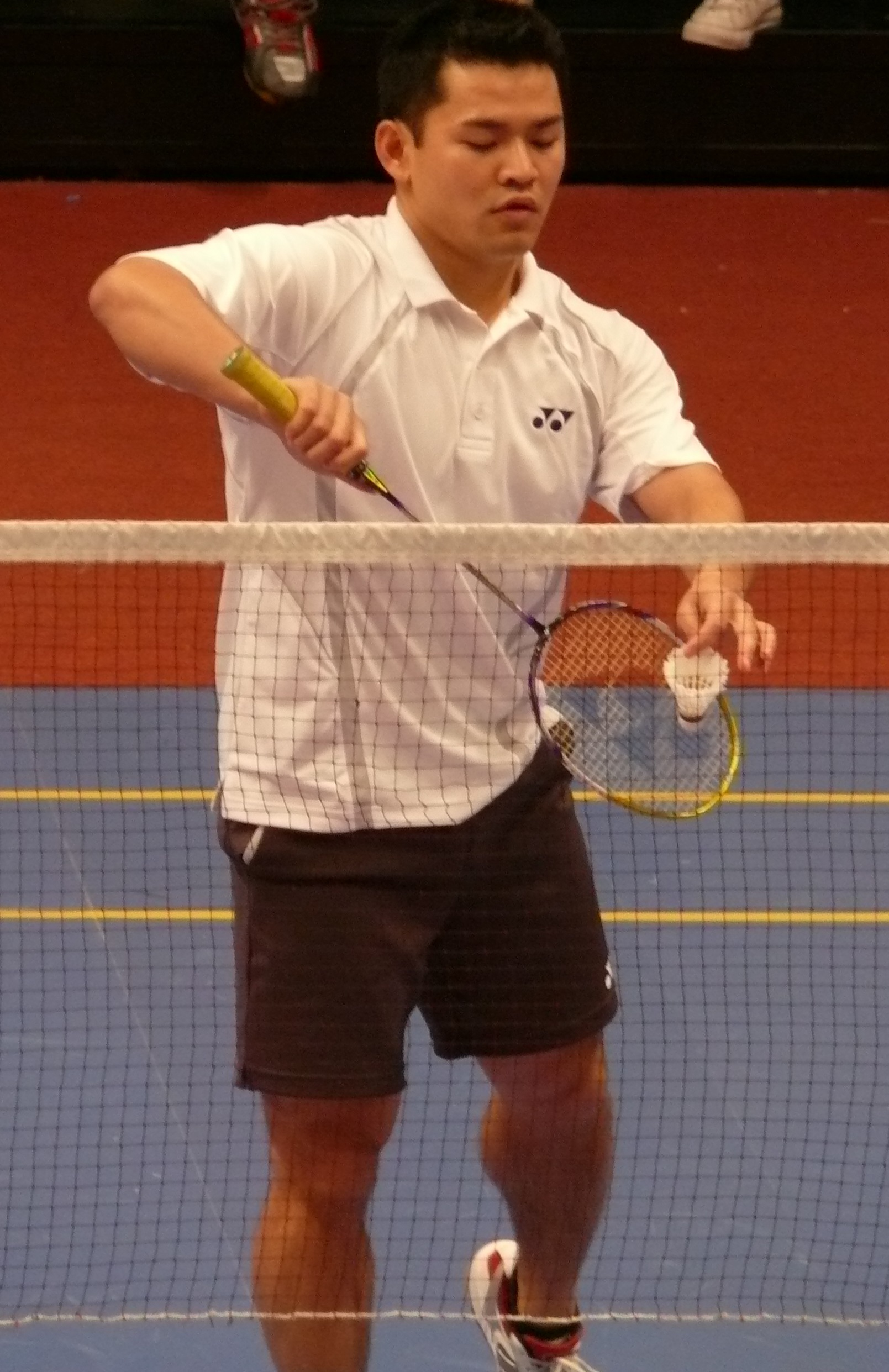

Personal information
- Born: February 22, 1979 (age 47) Ho Chi Minh City, Vietnam
- Height: 1.68 m (5 ft 6 in)
- Weight: 75 kg (165 lb)

Sport
- Country: United States
- Sport: Badminton
- Handedness: Right

Men's doubles
- Highest ranking: 9 (5 August 2010)
- BWF profile
Medal record
Men's badminton
Representing United States
World Championships
Gold medal – first place	2005 Anaheim	Men's doubles
World Cup
Bronze medal – third place	2005 Yiyang	Men's doubles
Pan American Games
Gold medal – first place	2011 Guadalajara	Men's doubles
Gold medal – first place	2007 Rio de Janeiro	Mixed doubles
Gold medal – first place	2003 Santo Domingo	Men's doubles
Silver medal – second place	2007 Rio de Janeiro	Men's doubles
Silver medal – second place	1999 Winnipeg	Men's doubles
Bronze medal – third place	2011 Guadalajara	Mixed doubles
Pan Am Championships
Gold medal – first place	2007 Calgary	Mixed doubles
Gold medal – first place	2001 Lima	Men's doubles
Gold medal – first place	1997 Winnipeg	Men's doubles
Silver medal – second place	2007 Calgary	Men's doubles
Bronze medal – third place	2001 Lima	Men's singles

Howard Bach (born February 22, 1979) is a Vietnamese-American male badminton player from the United States. He was the 2005 world champion in the men's doubles with Tony Gunawan.

== Early life ==
He was born in Vietnam, Howard Bach came to the U.S. at the age of two, when his father, Cam Sen Bach, emigrated to San Francisco with his family in 1982. When he was seven years old, Bach was brought by his father to a local YMCA and began to play badminton.

== Career ==
=== 2004 Olympics ===
Bach competed in badminton at the 2004 Summer Olympics in men's doubles with partner Kevin Han. They defeated Dorian James and Stewart Carson of South Africa in the first round, then were defeated in the round of 16 by Jens Eriksen and Martin Lundgaard Hansen of Denmark.

=== 2005 World Badminton Championships ===
From a modest 13th seeded position Howard Bach partnered with Tony Gunawan to win the final of the men's doubles 15–11, 10–15, 15–11, against the Indonesian pair, Candra Wijaya and Sigit Budiarto. Thus winning the United States's first ever gold at the World Championships.

The Championships were held at the Arrowhead Pond arena in Anaheim, California.

=== 2008 Olympics ===
He partnered with Bob Malaythong in Badminton at the 2008 Summer Olympics in Beijing, advancing to the quarterfinals – the furthest any American has ever reached. They were defeated by the Chinese pair, Cai Yun and Fu Haifeng.

=== 2012 Olympics ===
Bach and Tony Gunawan competed in the 2012 London Olympics. They were eliminated during the pool play.

== Achievements ==
=== World Championships ===
Men's doubles
Year	Venue	Partner	Opponent	Score	Result
2005	Arrowhead Pond, Anaheim, United States	(United States) Tony Gunawan	(Indonesia) Sigit Budiarto (Indonesia) Candra Wijaya	15–11, 10–15, 15–11	Gold

=== World Cup ===
Men's doubles
Year	Venue	Partner	Opponent	Score	Result
2005	Olympic Park, Yiyang, China	(United States) Tony Gunawan	(Indonesia) Sigit Budiarto (Indonesia) Candra Wijaya	18–21, 9–21	Bronze

=== Pan American Games ===
Men's doubles
Year	Venue	Partner	Opponent	Score	Result
1999	Winnipeg Convention Centre; Winnipeg, Canada	(United States) Mark Manha	(Canada) Brent Olynyk (Canada) Iain Sydie	17–15, 8–15, 6–15	Silver
2003	UASD Pavilion; Santo Domingo, Dominican Republic	(United States) Kevin Han	(Guatemala) Erick Anguiano (Guatemala) Pedro Yang	15–5, 15–3	Gold
2007	Riocentro Sports Complex Pavilion 4B; Rio de Janeiro, Brazil	(United States) Khan Malaythong	(Canada) Mike Beres (Canada) William Milroy	20–22, 13–21	Silver
2011	Multipurpose Gymnasium; Guadalajara, Mexico	(United States) Tony Gunawan	(United States) Halim Ho (United States) Sattawat Pongnairat	21–10, 21–14	Gold

Mixed doubles
Year	Venue	Partner	Opponent	Score	Result
2007	Riocentro Sports Complex Pavilion 4B; Rio de Janeiro, Brazil	(United States) Eva Lee	(Canada) Mike Beres (Canada) Valerie Loker	21–19, 21–16	Gold
2011	Multipurpose Gymnasium; Guadalajara, Mexico	(United States) Paula Lynn Obañana	(Canada) Toby Ng (Canada) Grace Gao	11–21, 21–19, 14–21	Bronze

=== Pan Am Championships ===
Men's singles
Year	Venue	Opponent	Score	Result
2001	Lima, Peru	(United States) Kevin Han	3–7, 1–7, 8–6	Bronze

Men's doubles
Year	Venue	Partner	Opponent	Score	Result
1997	Winnipeg Canoe Club; Winnipeg, Canada	(United States) Kevin Han	(United States) Mike Edstrom (United States) Chris Hales	15–10, 15–7	Gold
2001	Lima, Peru	(United States) Kevin Han	(Canada) Keith Chan (Canada) William Milroy	7–0, 7–1, 7–3	Gold
2007	Calgary Winter Club; Calgary, Canada	(United States) Khan Malaythong	(Canada) Mike Beres (Canada) William Milroy	13–21, 19–21	Silver

Mixed doubles
Year	Venue	Partner	Opponent	Score	Result
2007	Calgary Winter Club; Calgary, Canada	(United States) Eva Lee	(Canada) Mike Beres (Canada) Valerie Loker	21–18, 21–17	Gold

=== BWF Superseries ===
The BWF Superseries, which was launched on 14 December 2006 and implemented in 2007, was a series of elite badminton tournaments, sanctioned by the Badminton World Federation (BWF). BWF Superseries levels were Superseries and Superseries Premier. A season of Superseries consisted of twelve tournaments around the world that had been introduced since 2011. Successful players were invited to the Superseries Finals, which were held at the end of each year.

Men's doubles
Year	Tournament	Partner	Opponent	Score	Result
2010	Singapore Open	(United States) Tony Gunawan	(Chinese Taipei) Fang Chieh-min (Chinese Taipei) Lee Sheng-mu	14–21, 15–21	(silver) Runner-up

BWF Super Series Finals tournament
BWF Super Series Premier tournament
BWF Super Series tournament

=== BWF Grand Prix ===
The BWF Grand Prix had two levels, the Grand Prix and Grand Prix Gold. It was a series of badminton tournaments sanctioned by the Badminton World Federation (BWF) and played between 2007 and 2017. The World Badminton Grand Prix was sanctioned by the International Badminton Federation from 1983 to 2006.

Men's doubles
Year	Tournament	Partner	Opponent	Score	Result
2002	U.S. Open	(United States) Kevin Han	(United States) Tony Gunawan (United States) Khan Malaythong	15–11, 7–15, 7–15	(silver) Runner-up
2004	U.S. Open	(United States) Tony Gunawan	(Denmark) Mathias Boe (Denmark) Carsten Mogensen	15–5, 15–7	(gold) Winner
2004	Dutch Open	(United States) Tony Gunawan	(Denmark) Thomas Laybourn (Denmark) Peter Steffensen	15–8, 15–7	(gold) Winner
2007	U.S. Open	(United States) Khan Malaythong	(Japan) Tadashi Ohtsuka (Japan) Keita Masuda	18–21, 11–21	(silver) Runner-up
2008	U.S. Open	(United States) Khan Malaythong	(United States) Halim Haryanto (United States) Raju Rai	21–14, 21–19	(gold) Winner
2009	U.S. Open	(United States) Tony Gunawan	(Austria) Jürgen Koch (Austria) Peter Zauner	21–12, 21–9	(gold) Winner
2011	U.S. Open	(United States) Tony Gunawan	(South Korea) Ko Sung-hyun (South Korea) Lee Yong-dae	9–21, 19–21	(silver) Runner-up

Mixed doubles
Year	Tournament	Partner	Opponent	Score	Result
2007	U.S. Open	(United States) Eva Lee	(Japan) Keita Masuda (Japan) Miyuki Maeda	21–19, 11–21, 19–21	(silver) Runner-up
2009	U.S. Open	(United States) Eva Lee	(Canada) Alvin Lau (Canada) Jiang Xuelian	21–13, 21–12	(gold) Winner

BWF Grand Prix Gold tournament
BWF Grand Prix tournament

=== BWF International Challenge/Series ===
Men's singles
Year	Tournament	Opponent	Score	Result
1998	Miami International	(United States) Kevin Han	10–15, 1–15	(silver) Runner-up

Men's doubles
Year	Tournament	Partner	Opponent	Score	Result
1998	Miami International	(United States) Kevin Han	(United States) Andy Chong (United States) Mathew Fogarty	15–5, 15–12	(gold) Winner
1998	Slovenian International	(United States) Mark Manha	(Wales) Chris Davies (Wales) Matthew Hughes	15–3, 15–5	(gold) Winner
1998	Guatemala International	(United States) Mark Manha	(United States) Ryan Miglin (United States) Ben Wu	15–6, 15–8	(gold) Winner
1998	Mexico International	(United States) Mark Manha	(United States) Ryan Miglin (United States) Ben Wu	Walkover	(gold) Winner
1999	Peru International	(United States) Mark Manha	(Peru) Mario Carulla (Peru) José Antonio Iturriaga	17–14, 15–6	(gold) Winner
1999	Jamaica International	(United States) Mark Manha	(Canada) Bobby Milroy (Canada) William Milroy	15–8, 10–15, 15–11	(gold) Winner
1999	Guatemala International	(United States) Mark Manha	(Canada) Bryan Moody (Canada) Brent Olynyk	15–7, 8–15, 15–12	(gold) Winner
2000	Canadian International	(United States) Mark Manha	(Hong Kong) Ma Che Kong (Hong Kong) Yau Tsz Yuk	15–13, 3–15, 15–17	(silver) Runner-up
2000	Peru International	(United States) Mark Manha	(Hong Kong) Ma Che Kong (Hong Kong) Yau Tsz Yuk	6–15, 6–15	(silver) Runner-up
2001	Southern Pan Am Classic	(United States) Kevin Han	(Netherlands) Tjitte Weistra (Guatemala) Pedro Yang	5–7, 7–0, 7–0	(gold) Winner
2001	Brazil International	(United States) Kevin Han	(Brazil) Guilherme Pardo (Brazil) Ricardo Trevelin	15–5, 15–6	(gold) Winner
2003	Guatemala International	(United States) Kevin Han	(Japan) Keita Masuda (Japan) Tadashi Ohtsuka	6–15, 12–15	(silver) Runner-up
2003	Brazil International	(United States) Kevin Han	(Spain) José Antonio Crespo (Spain) Sergio Llopis	15–6, 11–15, 10–15	(silver) Runner-up
2004	Peru International	(United States) Kevin Han	(Peru) Rodrigo Pacheco (Peru) Guillermo Perea	15–7, 15–11	(gold) Winner
2005	SCBA International	(United States) Tony Gunawan	(United States) Raju Rai (United States) Khan Malaythong	1–0 Retired	(gold) Winner
2005	U.S. International	(United States) Tony Gunawan	(Canada) Mike Beres (Canada) William Milroy	15–1, 15–2	(gold) Winner
2006	Canadian International	(United States) Khan Malaythong	(Canada) Mike Beres (Canada) William Milroy	16–21, 21–19, 12–21	(silver) Runner-up
2007	Miami Pan Am International	(United States) Khan Malaythong	(Canada) Mike Beres (Canada) William Milroy	18–21, 19–21	(silver) Runner-up
2007	Norwegian International	(United States) Khan Malaythong	(Denmark) Mikkel Delbo Larsen (Denmark) Jacob Chemnitz	21–15, 21–11	(gold) Winner
2007	Irish International	(United States) Khan Malaythong	(Germany) Michael Fuchs (Germany) Roman Spitko	21–15, 21–17	(gold) Winner
2008	Canadian International	(United States) Khan Malaythong	(Japan) Keishi Kawaguchi (Japan) Naoki Kawamae	15–21, 15–21	(silver) Runner-up
2011	Peru International	(United States) Tony Gunawan	(Canada) Adrian Liu (Canada) Derrick Ng	21–10, 21–9	(gold) Winner
2012	Peru International	(United States) Tony Gunawan	(Canada) Adrian Liu (Canada) Derrick Ng	13–21, 21–13, 21–9	(gold) Winner

Mixed doubles
Year	Tournament	Partner	Opponent	Score	Result
1998	Miami International	(United States) Cindy Shi	(United States) Andy Chong (United States) Barbara McKinley	15–6, 15–11	(gold) Winner
2005	U.S. International	(United States) Eva Lee	(United States) Khan Malaythong (United States) Mesinee Mangkalakiri	13–15, 12–15	(silver) Runner-up
2006	Canadian International	(United States) Eva Lee	(Canada) William Milroy (Canada) Tammy Sun	21–19, 21–15	(gold) Winner
2007	Miami Pan Am International	(United States) Eva Lee	(Canada) Mike Beres (Canada) Valerie Loker	17–21, 23–21, 20–22	(silver) Runner-up
2007	Irish International	(United States) Eva Lee	(Belgium) Wouter Claes (Belgium) Nathalie Descamps	21–10, 21–13	(gold) Winner

BWF International Challenge tournament
BWF International Series tournament
BWF Future Series tournament
