= Boston Badminton Open =

Annual badminton tournament in Cambridge, Massachusetts

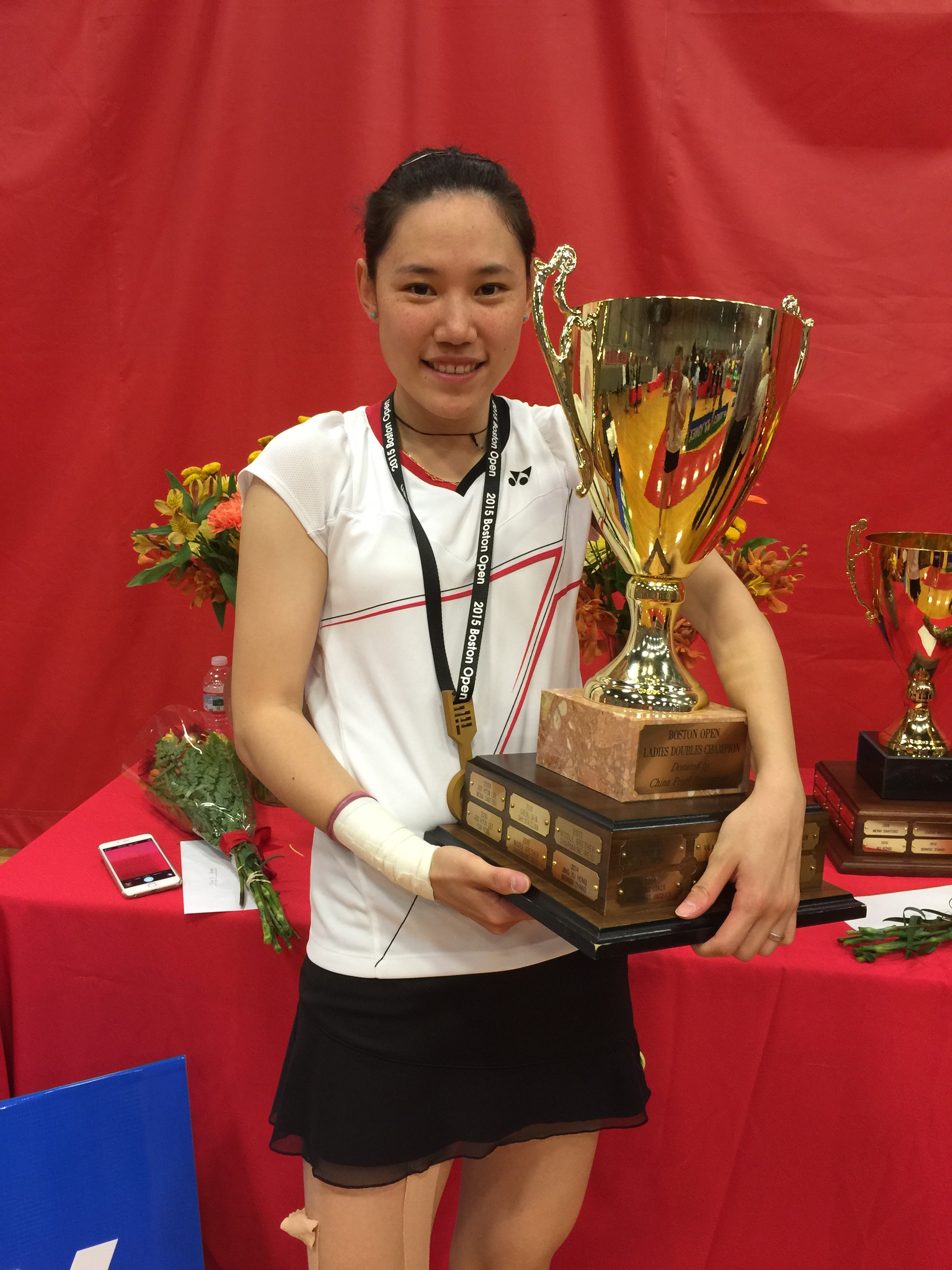
Boston Badminton Open

The Boston Open is an annual badminton tournament held in Cambridge, Massachusetts just across the Charles River from Boston. It has become the leading regularly held tournament in the Eastern United States.

== History ==
The Boston Open was established in 1997 as regional tournament for Northeastern players, the first significant open badminton tournament in Massachusetts since the earlier New England Open which had been played from the mid 1930s to the late 1980s. When the tournament was created, the Rockwell Cage at the Massachusetts Institute of Technology (MIT) in Cambridge, Massachusetts was chosen as the location for the tournament. The Rockwell Cage is an athletic facility at MIT, and home of the university's basketball and volleyball teams. The Boston Open has been held there ever since. Over time the tournament began to develop and gain popularity. It would soon become one of the top tournaments in North America, attracting badminton players from around the world.

== Sponsorship ==
In order to operate the Boston Open relies upon aid from sponsors. The MIT Badminton Club has been the primary sponsor for the Boston Open since 1997. The club works hard every year to make sure the tournament runs smoothly. The MIT Badminton Club is partially responsible for getting the Boston Open to where it is today. In 2014 adidas became the official named sponsor of the tournament, helping the Boston Open gain even more recognition and further prove its significance. With the new sponsorship from adidas in 2014, the Boston Open was able to increase their total tournament prize money to $22,150.

== Notable players ==
Howard Bach is a professional Vietnamese-American badminton player. He annually partakes in the Boston Open and has managed to win the championship for the men's doubles twice. Howard Bach is also one of the few American badminton players to participate in the Olympics.

== Previous winners ==
=== Open division ===
Year	Men's singles	Women's singles	Men's doubles	Women's doubles	Mixed doubles
1997	Wu Chibing	Vivian Tam	Tomasz Malcharek; Wu Chibing	Charlotte Ackerman; Liz Wilson	Wu Chibing; Alison Brown
1998	Wu Chibing	Tracey Thompson	Andy Chong; Kington Hooi	Daphne Chang; Ulrike Von Pfaler	Andy Chong; Emily Noyes
1999	Wu Chibing	Melinda Keszthelyi	Evgenij Dremin; Alexey Vasiliev	Mai-Quyen Bui; Melinda Keszthelyi	Andy Chong; Melinda Keszthelyi
2000	Stuart Arthur	Elie Wu	Evgenij Dremin; Alexey Vasiliev	Chantale Bergeron; Nancy Desaulniers	Alexey Vasiliev; Anna Efremova
2001	Mike Beres	Kara Solmundson	Trisna Gunadi; Ben Wu	Janis Tan; Elie Wu	Mike Beres; Kara Solmundson
2002	Chibing Wu	Elie Wu	Tony Gunawan; Khan Malaythong	Janis Tan; Elie Wu	Andy Chong; Szilvia Szombati
2003	Jimmy Pohan	Joo Hyun Lee	Andy Chong; Chibing Wu	Cindy Shi; Eti Tantra	Tony Gunawan; Eti Tantra
2004	Jackaphan Thanateeratam	Lili Zhou	Khan Malaythong; Raju Rai	Valerie Loker; Valérie St. Jacques	Jackaphan Thanateeratam; Lili Zhou
2005	Piotr Mazur	Lili Zhou	Pascal Gagnon; Tom Lucas-Piche	Valérie St. Jacques; Lili Zhou	Andy Chong; Szilvia Szombati
2006	Raju Rai	Lili Zhou	Howard Bach; Khan Malaythong	Eva Lee; Mesinee Mangkalakiri	Halim Haryanto; Angeline de Pauw
2007	Mike Beres	Joo Hyun Lee	Halim Haryanto; Khan Malaythong	Angeline de Pauw; Mona Santoso	Chandra Kowi; Mona Santoso
2008	Holvy de Pauw	Joo Hyun Lee	Howard Bach; Khan Malaythong	Joo Hyun Lee; Mona Santoso	Chandra Kowi; Mona Santoso
2009	Hock Lai Lee	Mona Santoso	Sameera Gunatileka; Vincent Nguy	Joo Hyun Lee; Mona Santoso	Chandra Kowi; Mona Santoso
2010	Nguyen Quang Minh	Bo Rong	Holvy de Pauw; Nguyen Quang Minh	Joo Hyun Lee; Grace Peng	Holvy de Pauw; Grace Peng
2011	Ilian Perez	Cheng Wen	Holvy de Pauw; Nguyen Quang Minh	Cheng Wen; Shi Xiaoqian	Nguyen Quang Minh; Yee Theng Lim
2012	Ilian Perez	Beiwen Zhang	Holvy de Pauw; Nguyen Quang Minh	Nicole Grether; Charmaine Reid	Halim Haryanto; Bo Rong
2013	Sattawat Pongnairat	Beiwen Zhang	Holvy de Pauw; Christian Christianto	Nicole Grether; Charmaine Reid	Holvy de Pauw; Eva Lee
2014	Hock Lai Lee	Beiwen Zhang	Howard Bach; Hock Lai Lee	Beiwen Zhang; Jing Yu Hong	Howard Bach; Eva Lee
2015	Charles Gu	Beiwen Zhang	Howard Bach; Hock Lai Lee	Beiwen Zhang; Jing Yu Hong	Howard Bach; Beiwen Zhang
2016	Chan Kwong Beng	Beiwen Zhang	Charles Gu; Halim Haryanto	Beiwen Zhang; Jing Yu Hong	Yoo Yong-sung; Daphne Ng
2017	Chan Kwong Beng	Beiwen Zhang	Howard Bach; Holvy de Pauw	Beiwen Zhang; Jing Yu Hong	Yoo Yong-sung; Jenna Gozali
2018	Ye Binghong	Beiwen Zhang	Ow Yao Han; Yew Hong Kheng	Beiwen Zhang; Jing Yu Hong	Sutichon Pol-Gul; Natcha Saengchote
2019	Febriyan Irvannaldy	Megumi Taruno	Arya Maulana Aldiartama; Rangga Yave Rianto	Megumi Taruno; Natcha Saengchote	Sittichai Viboonsin; Natcha Saengchote

=== Senior division ===
Year	Men's doubles	Women's doubles	Mixed doubles
2008	Pratap Joshi / Ravi Raveendran	Batool Kazim / Mette Ravn	Naruthum Surakkhaka / Daphne Chang
2009	Pratap Joshi / Anirudh Makarla	Batool Kazim / Ismat Shaikh	Phu Khuu / Daphne Chang

== 2014 prize money ==
Event	Winner	Runner up	Semi-Finalists	Cons. Winner
Men's Singles	$1,700	$850	$350 each player	$100
Ladies Singles	$1,700	$850	$350 each player	$100
Men's Doubles	$1,200 each player	$600 each player	$225 each player	$100 each player
Ladies Doubles	$1,200 each player	$600 each player	$225 each player	$100 each player
Mixed Doubles	$1,200 each player	$600 each player	$225 each player	$100 each player
Senior Men's Doubles	$150 each player	$75 each player		
Senior Ladies Doubles	$150 each player	$75 each player		
Senior Mixed Doubles	$150 each player	$75 each player		
