= Badminton at the 2007 Pan American Games – Men's doubles =

The men's doubles at the 2007 Pan American Games was played at the Riocentro Sports Complex, Pavilion 4B. The competition was held between July 14 and 18.

== Medals ==
| Gold | William Milroy / Mike Beres; Canada |
| Silver | Howard Bach / Bob Malaythong; United States |
| Bronze | Guilherme Kumasaka / Guilherme Pardo; Brazil |
| Bronze | Pedro Yang / Erick Anguiano; Guatemala |

== Draw ==
=== Finals ===
| Semifinals | | | | Final |
| 1 | H Bach (United States) B Malaythong (USA) | 21 | 21 |
| 3 | G Kumasaka (Brazil) G Pardo (BRA) | 13 | 13 | 1 | H Bach (United States) B Malaythong (USA) | 20 | 13 |
| 4 | P Yang (Guatemala) E Anguiano (GUA) | 16 | 14 | 2 | W Milroy (Canada) M Beres (CAN) | 22 | 21 |
| 2 | W Milroy (Canada) M Beres (CAN) | 21 | 21 |

=== Top half ===
Round of 32
K Cordón (Guatemala) R Ramírez (GUA) | 21 | 22 | 21
J Aguilar (Mexico) JL Gonzalez (MEX) | 14 | 21 | 15

Round of 16
1 | H Bach (United States) B Malaythong (USA) | 21 | 21
J Martin (Jamaica) E Mendez (JAM) | 9 | 9
G Thomas (Trinidad and Tobago) K Pantin (TRI) | 21 | 19 | 21
D Snider (Canada) J Rogers (CAN) | 19 | 21 | 12
3 | G Kumasaka (Brazil) G Pardo (BRA) | 21 | 21
V Soeroredjo (Suriname) M Wongsodikromo (SUR) | 16 | 11
A Hernandez (Cuba) O Guerrero (CUB) | 19 | 12
K Cordón (Guatemala) R Ramírez (GUA) | 21 | 21

Quarterfinals
1 | H Bach (United States) B Malaythong (USA) | 21 | 21
G Thomas (Trinidad and Tobago) K Pantin (TRI) | 8 | 6
3 | G Kumasaka (Brazil) G Pardo (BRA) | 21 | 16 | 21
K Cordón (Guatemala) R Ramírez (GUA) | 7 | 21 | 17

Semifinals
1 | H Bach (United States) B Malaythong (USA) | 21 | 21
3 | G Kumasaka (Brazil) G Pardo (BRA) | 13 | 13

=== Bottom half ===
First Round
R Rampersad (Trinidad and Tobago) A Seepaul (TRI) | 15 | 11
J Jimeno (Peru) F Ugaz (PER) | 21 | 21

Second Round
J Jimeno (Peru) F Ugaz (PER) | 21 | 21
T Thouyaret (Argentina) S Bugallo (ARG) | 7 | 12
E Go (United States) N Jinadasa (USA) | 15 | 21 | 16
4 | P Yang (Guatemala) E Anguiano (GUA) | 21 | 18 | 21
M Garrido (Mexico) S Sanchez (MEX) | 15 | 21 | 21
K Wood (Barbados) A Padmore (BAR) | 21 | 15 | 14
P von Scala (Brazil) L Araujo (BRA) | 19 | 23 | 19
W Milroy (Canada) M Beres (CAN) | 21 | 21 | 21

Quarterfinals
J Jimeno (Peru) F Ugaz (PER) | 16 | 18
4 | P Yang (Guatemala) E Anguiano (GUA) | 21 | 21
M Garrido (Mexico) S Sanchez (MEX) | 4 | 10
2 | W Milroy (Canada) M Beres (CAN) | 21 | 21

Semifinals
4 | P Yang (Guatemala) E Anguiano (GUA) | 16 | 14
2 | W Milroy (Canada) M Beres (CAN) | 21 | 21
