= Badminton at the 2000 Summer Olympics – Men's doubles =

Men's doubles at the Games of the XXVII Olympiad
- Venue: Pavilion 3, Sydney Olympic Park
- Date: 16–21 September 2000
- Competitors: 23 pairs from 15 nations

Medalists
1st place, gold medalist(s)		Tony Gunawan; Candra Wijaya	Indonesia
2nd place, silver medalist(s)		Lee Dong-soo; Yoo Yong-sung	South Korea
3rd place, bronze medalist(s)		Ha Tae-kwon; Kim Dong-moon	South Korea

These are the results for the men’s doubles badminton tournament of 2000 Summer Olympics. The tournament was single-elimination. Matches consisted of three sets, with sets being to 15 for men's doubles. The tournament was held at Pavilion 3, Sydney Olympic Park.

== Seeds ==
1. Tony Gunawan and Candra Wijaya (INA) (gold medalist)
2. Lee Dong-soo and Yoo Yong-sung (KOR) (silver medalist)
3. Eng Hian and Flandy Limpele (INA) (quarterfinals)
4. Ha Tae Kwon and Kim Dong Moon (KOR) (bronze medalist)
5. Choong Tan Fook and Lee Wan Wah (MAS) (fourth place)
6. Ricky Subagja and Rexy Mainaky (INA) (quarterfinals)
7. Jens Eriksen and Jesper Larsen (DEN) (quarterfinals)
8. Simon Archer and Nathan Robertson (GBR) (quarterfinals)

== Results ==
Section	Athletes	Country
Top	Tony Gunawan and Candra Wijaya	Indonesia
Top	Jim Laugesen and Michael Søgaard	Denmark
Top	Simon Archer and Nathan Robertson	Great Britain
Top	Michał Łogosz and Robert Mateusiak	Poland
Top	David Bamford and Peter Blackburn	Australia
Top	Ha Tae-kwon and Kim Dong-moon	South Korea
Top	Cheah Soon Kit and Yap Kim Hock	Malaysia
Top	Chen Qiqiu and Yu Jinhao	China
Top	Ricky Subagja and Rexy Mainaky	Indonesia
Top	Martin Lundgaard and Lars Paaske	Denmark
Top	Mikhail Popov and Svetoslav Stojanov	Bulgaria
Bottom	Tesana Panvisvas and Pramote Teerawiwatana	Thailand
Bottom	Dennis Lens and Quinten van Dalm	Netherlands
Bottom	Choong Tan Fook and Lee Wan Wah	Malaysia
Bottom	Peter Axelsson and Pär-Gunnar Jönsson	Sweden
Bottom	Michael Helber and Björn Siegemund	Germany
Bottom	Eng Hian and Flandy Limpele	Indonesia
Bottom	Brian Moody and Brent Olynyk	Canada
Bottom	Zhang Jun and Zhang Wei	China
Bottom	Jens Eriksen and Jesper Larsen	Denmark
Bottom	Peter Knowles and Julian Robertson	Great Britain
Bottom	Eddy Clarisse and Denis Constantin	Mauritius
Bottom	Lee Dong-soo and Yoo Yong-sung	South Korea

== Draw ==
=== Final ===
Semifinals
1	Tony Gunawan (INA); Candra Wijaya (INA)	15	15
4	Ha Tae-kwon (KOR); Kim Dong-moon (KOR)	13	10
5	Choong Tan Fook (MAS); Lee Wan Wah (MAS)	12	15	4
2	Lee Dong-soo (KOR); Yoo Yong-sung (KOR)	15	7	15

Final
1	Tony Gunawan (INA); Candra Wijaya (INA)	15	9	15
2	Lee Dong-soo (KOR); Yoo Yong-sung (KOR)	10	15	7
Bronze medal match
4	Ha Tae-kwon (KOR); Kim Dong-moon (KOR)	15	15
5	Choong Tan Fook (MAS); Lee Wan Wah (MAS)	2	8

=== Top half ===
Round 1
1	Tony Gunawan (INA); Candra Wijaya (INA)
bye
Jim Laugesen (DEN); Michael Søgaard (DEN)
bye
8	Simon Archer (GBR); Nathan Robertson (GBR)
bye
Michał Łogosz (POL); Robert Mateusiak (POL)	15	16	15
David Bamford (AUS); Peter Blackburn (AUS)	5	17	6
4	Ha Tae-kwon (KOR); Kim Dong-moon (KOR)
bye
Cheah Soon Kit (MAS); Yap Kim Hock (MAS)	4	17	15
Chen Qiqiu (CHN); Yu Jinhao (CHN)	15	16	10
6	Ricky Subagja (INA); Rexy Mainaky (INA)
bye
Martin Lundgaard (DEN); Lars Paaske (DEN)	15	15
Mikhail Popov (BUL); Svetoslav Stojanov (BUL)	6	6

Round 2
1	Tony Gunawan (INA); Candra Wijaya (INA)	15	15
Jim Laugesen (DEN); Michael Søgaard (DEN)	9	7
8	Simon Archer (GBR); Nathan Robertson (GBR)	15	15
Michał Łogosz (POL); Robert Mateusiak (POL)	1	10
4	Ha Tae-kwon (KOR); Kim Dong-moon (KOR)	15	15
Cheah Soon Kit (MAS); Yap Kim Hock (MAS)	5	3
6	Ricky Subagja (INA); Rexy Mainaky (INA)	15	13	15
Martin Lundgaard (DEN); Lars Paaske (DEN)	9	15	7

Quarterfinals
1	Tony Gunawan (INA); Candra Wijaya (INA)	15	15
8	Simon Archer (GBR); Nathan Robertson (GBR)	13	11
4	Ha Tae-kwon (KOR); Kim Dong-moon (KOR)	15	15
6	Ricky Subagja (INA); Rexy Mainaky (INA)	5	9

Semifinals
1	Tony Gunawan (INA); Candra Wijaya (INA)
4	Ha Tae-kwon (KOR); Kim Dong-moon (KOR)

=== Bottom half ===
Round 1
Tesana Panvisvas (THA); Pramote Teerawiwatana (THA)	15	15
Dennis Lens (NED); Quinten van Dalm (NED)	11	7
bye
5	Choong Tan Fook (MAS); Lee Wan Wah (MAS)
Peter Axelsson (SWE); Pär-Gunnar Jönsson (SWE)	15	17
Michael Helber (GER); Björn Siegemund (GER)	7	15
bye
3	Eng Hian (INA); Flandy Limpele (INA)
Brian Moody (CAN); Brent Olynyk (CAN)
Zhang Jun (CHN); Zhang Wei (CHN)	WO
bye
7	Jens Eriksen (DEN); Jesper Larsen (DEN)
Peter Knowles (GBR); Julian Robertson (GBR)	15	15
Eddy Clarisse (MRI); Denis Constantin (MRI)	6	10
bye
2	Lee Dong-soo (KOR); Yoo Yong-sung (KOR)

Round 2
Tesana Panvisvas (THA); Pramote Teerawiwatana (THA)	15	15	9
5	Choong Tan Fook (MAS); Lee Wan Wah (MAS)	11	17	15
Peter Axelsson (SWE); Pär-Gunnar Jönsson (SWE)	12	11
3	Eng Hian (INA); Flandy Limpele (INA)	15	15
Brian Moody (CAN); Brent Olynyk (CAN)	2	1
7	Jens Eriksen (DEN); Jesper Larsen (DEN)	15	15
Peter Knowles (GBR); Julian Robertson (GBR)	4	8
2	Lee Dong-soo (KOR); Yoo Yong-sung (KOR)	15	15

Quarterfinals
5	Choong Tan Fook (MAS); Lee Wan Wah (MAS)	15	15
3	Eng Hian (INA); Flandy Limpele (INA)	10	9
7	Jens Eriksen (DEN); Jesper Larsen (DEN)	12	10
2	Lee Dong-soo (KOR); Yoo Yong-sung (KOR)	15	15

Semifinals
5	Choong Tan Fook (MAS); Lee Wan Wah (MAS)
2	Lee Dong-soo (KOR); Yoo Yong-sung (KOR)
