= 2007 Pan Am Badminton Championships =

The XIII 2007 Pan Am Badminton Championships were held in Calgary, Alberta, Canada, between May 15 and May 19, 2007.

This event was part of the 2007 BWF Grand Prix Gold and Grand Prix series of the Badminton World Federation.

== Venue ==
- Calgary Winter Club

== Medalists ==
Event	Gold	Silver	Bronze
Men's singles	(Canada) Stephan Wojcikiewicz	(Canada) Andrew Dabeka	(Canada) Kyle Foley
Men's singles	(Canada) Stephan Wojcikiewicz	(Canada) Andrew Dabeka	(Peru) Andrés Corpancho
Women's singles	(Canada) Anna Rice	(Peru) Claudia Rivero	(Canada) Sarah MacMaster
Women's singles	(Canada) Anna Rice	(Peru) Claudia Rivero	(Canada) Charmaine Reid
Men's doubles	(Canada) Mike Beres (Canada) William Milroy	(United States) Khan Malaythong (United States) Howard Bach	(Canada) Kyle Holoboff (Canada) Toby Ng
Men's doubles	(Canada) Mike Beres (Canada) William Milroy	(United States) Khan Malaythong (United States) Howard Bach	(Guatemala) Erick Anguiano (Guatemala) Pedro Yang
Women's doubles	(Canada) Fiona McKee (Canada) Charmaine Reid	(United States) Mesinee Mangkalakiri (United States) Eva Lee	(Peru) Cristina Aicardi (Peru) Claudia Rivero
Women's doubles	(Canada) Fiona McKee (Canada) Charmaine Reid	(United States) Mesinee Mangkalakiri (United States) Eva Lee	(Mexico) Naty Rangel (Mexico) Rossina Núñez
Mixed doubles	(United States) Howard Bach (United States) Eva Lee	(Canada) Mike Beres (Canada) Valerie Loker	(United States) Nicholas Jinadasa (United States) Samantha Jinadasa
Mixed doubles	(United States) Howard Bach (United States) Eva Lee	(Canada) Mike Beres (Canada) Valerie Loker	(United States) Khan Malaythong (United States) Mesinee Mangkalakiri
Teams	Canada	United States	Peru
