= Bryan Moody =

Canadian badminton player (born 1972)

Personal information
- Born: 16 January 1972 (age 54) Pointe-Claire, Quebec, Canada
- Height: 1.75 m (5 ft 9 in)
- Weight: 77 kg (170 lb)

Sport
- Country: Canada
- Sport: Badminton
- Handedness: Right
- Event: Men's & mixed doubles

Men's & mixed doubles
- BWF profile
Medal record
Men's badminton
Representing Canada
Pan American Games
Bronze medal – third place	1999 Winnipeg	Men's doubles
Pan Am Championships
Bronze medal – third place	1997 Winnipeg	Men's doubles

Bryan Moody (born 16 January 1972) is a Canadian badminton player who affiliated with the Glencoe club in Calgary. He represented Canada at the 2000 Summer Olympics and 1998 Commonwealth Games. Moody was three times national champion. He also won the bronze medals at the 1997 Pan Am Championships, and 1999 Pan American Games.

== Achievements ==
=== Pan American Games ===
Men's doubles

Year	Venue	Partner	Opponent	Score	Result
1999	Winnipeg, Canada	(Canada) Mike Beres	(United States) Howard Bach (United States) Mark Manha	15–10, 6–15, 8–15	Bronze

=== Pan Am Championships ===
Men's doubles

Year	Venue	Partner	Opponent	Score	Result
1997	Winnipeg, Canada	(Canada) Mike Beres	(United States) Mike Edstrom (United States) Chris Hales	12–15, 4–15	Bronze

=== IBF International ===
Men's doubles

Year	Tournament	Partner	Opponent	Score	Result
2000	Chile International	(Canada) Brent Olynyk	(Hong Kong) Ma Che Kong (Hong Kong) Yau Tsz Yuk	3–15, 11–15	(silver) Runner-up
1999	Guatemala International	(Canada) Brent Olynyk	(United States) Howard Bach (United States) Mark Manha	7–15, 15–8, 12–15	(silver) Runner-up
