= Ma Che Kong =

Hong Kong badminton player

Ma Che Kong 馬智江
Personal information
- Born: 25 May 1974 (age 52)

Sport
- Country: Hong Kong
- Sport: Badminton
- Event: Doubles

Doubles
- BWF profile
Medal record
Men's badminton
Representing Hong Kong
Commonwealth Games
Bronze medal – third place	1994 Victoria	Mixed team

Ma Che Kong (Chinese: 馬智江; also known as Edwin Ma Che Kong; born 25 May 1974) is a retired badminton player from Hong Kong.

Kong won most of the finals he contested in, which includes his victories in Poland, New Zealand, Australia, Chile, Canada, Mexico, Peru, Argentina, and Brazil. In 2000, Hong Kong hosted its first-ever National Badminton Championships and he won the title in men's doubles with partner Yau Kwun Yuen. He was one of the most dominating players of his country in the late '90s. He has represented Hong Kong in major events such as Thomas Cup, Asian Games, World Championships and Commonwealth Games. He was also a team member in Asia Cup badminton 2001. After his sporting career, he started a career as a coach in badminton for disabled people.

== Achievements ==
=== IBF Grand Prix ===
The World Badminton Grand Prix has been sanctioned by the International Badminton Federation since 1983.

Men's doubles
Year	Tournament	Partner	Opponent	Score	Result
1999	Polish Open	(Hong Kong) Yau Tsz Yuk	(Poland) Michał Łogosz (Poland) Robert Mateusiak	13–15, 15–7, 9–15	(silver) Runner-up

Mixed doubles
Year	Tournament	Partner	Opponent	Score	Result
1999	Polish Open	(Hong Kong) Koon Wai Chee	(Hong Kong) Yau Tsz Yuk (Hong Kong) Chan Mei Mei	15–6, 15–3	(gold) Winner

=== IBF International ===
Men's doubles
Year	Tournament	Partner	Opponent	Score	Result
2000	Waitakere International	(Hong Kong) Yau Tsz Yuk	(Hong Kong) Albertus Susanto Njoto (Hong Kong) Liu Kwok Wa	15–11, 15–9	(gold) Winner
2000	Chile International	(Hong Kong) Yau Tsz Yuk	(Canada) Brent Olynyk (Canada) Bryan Moody	15–3, 15–11	(gold) Winner
2000	Peru International	(Hong Kong) Yau Tsz Yuk	(United States) Howard Bach (United States) Mark Manha	15–6, 15–6	(gold) Winner
2000	Canadian International	(Hong Kong) Yau Tsz Yuk	(United States) Howard Bach (United States) Mark Manha	13–15, 15–3, 17–15	(gold) Winner
1999	Mexico International	(Hong Kong) Yau Tsz Yuk	(Japan) Keita Masuda (Japan) Tadashi Ohtsuka	15–7, 13–15, 15–10	(gold) Winner
1999	Victoria International	(Hong Kong) Yau Tsz Yuk	(Australia) David Bamford (Australia) Peter Blackburn	15–4, 15–6	(gold) Winner
1999	Argentina International	(Hong Kong) Yau Tsz Yuk	(Hong Kong) Cun Cun Harjono (Hong Kong) Liu Kwok Wa	15–6, 15–7	(gold) Winner
1999	São Paulo International	(Hong Kong) Yau Tsz Yuk	(Hong Kong) Cun Cun Harjono (Hong Kong) Liu Kwok Wa	17–14, 15–4	(gold) Winner
1999	Wellington International	(Hong Kong) Yau Tsz Yuk	(Australia) David Bamford (Australia) Peter Blackburn	15–8, 3–15, 6–15	(silver) Runner-up
1997	New Zealand International	(Hong Kong) Liu Kwok Wa	(New Zealand) Jeremy Raines (New Zealand) Croydon Rutherford	15–11, 17–14	(gold) Winner
1996	New Zealand International	(Hong Kong) Chow Kin Man	(New Zealand) Geoff Bellingham (New Zealand) Nicholas Hall	15–11, 15–5	(gold) Winner
1996	Australian International	(Hong Kong) Chow Kin Man	(China) Zheng Yumin (China) Zheng Yushen	11–15, 15–13, 15–10	(gold) Winner

Mixed doubles
Year	Tournament	Partner	Opponent	Score	Result
1997	New Zealand International	(Hong Kong) Tung Chau Man	(New Zealand) Mark Ravis (Australia) Sarah Hicks	15–8, 15–8	(gold) Winner
