= Indonesia at the 2000 Summer Olympics =

- IOC code: INA
- NOC: Indonesian Olympic Committee
- Website: www.nocindonesia.or.id (in Indonesian)

in Sydney
- Competitors: 47 in 12 sports
- Flag bearer: Rexy Mainaky
- Medals Ranked 38th: Gold 1 Silver 3 Bronze 2 Total 6

Summer Olympics appearances (overview)
- 1952; 1956; 1960; 1964; 1968; 1972; 1976; 1980; 1984; 1988; 1992; 1996; 2000; 2004; 2008; 2012; 2016; 2020; 2024

Other related appearances
- Individual Olympic Athletes (2000); Timor-Leste (2004–pres.)

Indonesia competed at the 2000 Summer Olympics in Sydney, Australia.

== Medalists ==
Medal	Name	Sport	Event	Date
Gold	Tony Gunawan; Candra Wijaya	Badminton	Men's doubles	21 September
Silver	Raema Lisa Rumbewas	Weightlifting	Women's 48 kg	17 September
Silver	Tri Kusharjanto; Minarti Timur	Badminton	Mixed doubles	21 September
Silver	Hendrawan	Badminton	Men's singles	23 September
Bronze	Sri Indriyani	Weightlifting	Women's 48 kg	17 September
Bronze	Winarni Binti Slamet	Weightlifting	Women's 53 kg	18 September

Medals by sport
Sport	1st place, gold medalist(s)	2nd place, silver medalist(s)	3rd place, bronze medalist(s)	Total
Badminton	1	2	0	3
Weightlifting	0	1	2	3
Total	1	3	2	6

Medals by gender
Gender	1st place, gold medalist(s)	2nd place, silver medalist(s)	3rd place, bronze medalist(s)	Total
Female	0	1	2	3
Male	1	1	0	2
Mixed	0	1	0	1
Total	1	3	2	6

Medals by date
Date	1st place, gold medalist(s)	2nd place, silver medalist(s)	3rd place, bronze medalist(s)	Total
17 August	0	1	1	2
18 August	0	0	1	1
21 August	1	1	0	2
23 August	0	1	0	1
Total	1	3	2	6

== Competitors ==
The following is the list of number of competitors participating in the Games:

Sport	Men	Women	Total
Archery	0	1	1
Athletics	4	1	5
Badminton	11	8	19
Boxing	2	0	2
Diving	1	2	3
Judo	1	1	2
Sailing	1	0	1
Swimming	5	1	6
Table tennis	2	0	2
Taekwondo	0	1	1
Tennis	0	2	2
Weightlifting	0	3	3
Total	27	20	47

== Archery ==
Indonesia sent only one archer to Sydney. She won her first match but was defeated in the second round.

Athlete	Event	Ranking round		Round of 64	Round of 32	Round of 16	Quarterfinals	Semifinals	Final / BM	
Athlete	Event	Score	Seed	Opposition Score	Opposition Score	Opposition Score	Opposition Score	Opposition Score	Opposition Score	Rank
Hamdiah Damanhuri	Women's individual	637	15	Chhoden (BHU); W 165–153	Ioriatti (ITA); L 156^{6}–156^{7}	Did not advance				

== Athletics ==
Key

- Note–Ranks given for track events are within the athlete's heat only
- Q = Qualified for the next round
- q = Qualified for the next round as a fastest loser or, in field events, by position without achieving the qualifying target
- NR = National record
- N/A = Round not applicable for the event
- Bye = Athlete not required to compete in round

Men's Track
Athlete	Event	Heat		Quarterfinal		Semifinal		Final	
Athlete	Event	Result	Rank	Result	Rank	Result	Rank	Result	Rank
John Herman Muray	100 metres	10.68	6 (Heat 6)	Did not advance					
Yanes Raubaba	100 metres	10.54	7 (Heat 8)	Did not advance					
Erwin Heru Susanto	100 metres	10.87	6 (Heat 11)	Did not advance					
John Herman Muray; Yanes Raubaba; Sukari; Erwin Heru Susanto	4 × 100 metres	40.35	7 (Heat 5)	Did not advance					

Women's Track
Athlete	Event	Heat		Quarterfinal		Semifinal		Final	
Athlete	Event	Result	Rank	Result	Rank	Result	Rank	Result	Rank
Irene Truitje Joseph	100 metres	11.93	6 (Heat 9)	Did not advance					

== Badminton ==
Indonesia received one gold medal and two silver medals in badminton.

Men

Athlete	Event	Round of 64	Round of 32	Round of 16	Quarterfinal	Semifinal	Final / BM	
Athlete	Event	Opposition Score	Opposition Score	Opposition Score	Opposition Score	Opposition Score	Opposition Score	Rank
Taufik Hidayat	Singles	Bye	Yamada (JPN); W 15–5, 14–17, 15–8	Ong (MAS); W 15–9, 13–15, 15–3	Ji (CHN); L 12–15, 5–15	Did not advance		
Hendrawan	Singles	Bye	Tam (HKG); W 15–7, 15–7	Gopichand (IND); W 15–9, 15–4	Sun (CHN); W 15–3, 15–5	Xia (CHN); W 15–12, 15–4	Ji (CHN); L 4–15, 13–15	2nd place, silver medalist(s)
Marleve Mainaky	Singles	Bye	Johansson (SWE); W 15–11, 17–16	Hwang (KOR); W 15–5, 15–3	Gade (DEN); L 6–15, 6–15	Did not advance		
Candra Wijaya; Tony Gunawan	Doubles	—N/a	Bye	Laugesen / Søgaard (DEN); W 15–9, 15–7	Archer / Robertson (GBR); W 15–13, 15–11	Ha / Kim (KOR); W 15–13, 15–10	Lee / Yoo (KOR); W 15–10, 9–15, 15–7	1st place, gold medalist(s)
Flandy Limpele; Eng Hian	Doubles	—N/a	Bye	Axelsson / Jonsson (SWE); W 15–12, 15–11	Choong / Lee (MAS); L 10–15, 9–15	Did not advance		
Ricky Subagja; Rexy Mainaky	Doubles	—N/a	Bye	Lundgaard / Paaske (DEN); W 15–9, 13–15, 15–7	Ha / Kim (KOR); L 5–15, 9–15	Did not advance		

Women

Athlete	Event	Round of 64	Round of 32	Round of 16	Quarterfinal	Semifinal	Final / BM	
Athlete	Event	Opposition Score	Opposition Score	Opposition Score	Opposition Score	Opposition Score	Opposition Score	Rank
Lidya Djaelawijaya	Singles	Solmundson (CAN); W 11–4, 11–4	Dimbour (FRA); W 11–1, 11–6	Gong (CHN); L 9–11, 3–11	Did not advance			
Ellen Angelina	Singles	Bye	Martin (DEN); L 6–11, 2–11	Did not advance				
Etty Tantri; Cynthia Tuwankotta	Doubles	—N/a	Bye	Jorgensen / Schjoldager (DEN); W 17–16, 15–10	Ge / Gu (CHN); L 3–15, 5–15	Did not advance		
Deyana Lomban; Eliza Nathanael	Doubles	—N/a	Davies / Hardaker (GBR); L 13–15, 11–15	Did not advance				

Mixed

Athlete	Event	Round of 64	Round of 32	Round of 16	Quarterfinal	Semifinal	Final / BM	
Athlete	Event	Opposition Score	Opposition Score	Opposition Score	Opposition Score	Opposition Score	Opposition Score	Rank
Tri Kusharjanto; Minarti Timur	Doubles	—N/a	Bye	Ha / Chung (KOR); W 15–13, 15–11	Eriksen / Schjoldager (DEN); W 15–3, 18–8	Archer / Goode (GBR); W 2–15, 17–15, 15–11	Zhang / Gao (CHN); L 15–1, 13–15, 11–15	2nd place, silver medalist(s)
Bambang Suprianto; Zelin Resiana	Doubles	—N/a	Hunt / Kellogg (GBR); W 15–10, 15–1	Chen / Chen (CHN); W 15–10, 15–3	Sogaard / Olsen (DEN); L 14–17, 15–10, 11–15	Did not advance		

== Boxing ==
Athlete	Event	Round of 32	Round of 16	Quarterfinals	Semifinals	Final	
Athlete	Event	Opposition Result	Opposition Result	Opposition Result	Opposition Result	Opposition Result	Rank
La Paene Masara	Light flyweight	Calderón (PUR); W 10–5	Kim K (KOR); L 4–8	Did not advance			
Hermensen Ballo	Flyweight	Navarro (USA); L 10–16	Did not advance				

== Diving ==
Men's Competition

Athlete	Event	Preliminary		Semifinal		Final	
Athlete	Event	Points	Rank	Points	Rank	Points	Rank
Muhammad Nasrullah	10 m platform	257.22	40	Did not advance			

Women's Competition

Athlete	Event	Preliminary		Semifinal		Final	
Athlete	Event	Points	Rank	Points	Rank	Points	Rank
Eka Purnama Indah	3 m springboard	178.83	42	Did not advance			
Shenny Ratna Amelia	10 m platform	170.07	40	Did not advance			

== Judo ==
Athlete	Event	Round of 32	Round of 16	Quarterfinals	Semifinals	Repechage 1	Repechage 2	Repechage 3	Final / BM	
Athlete	Event	Opposition Result	Opposition Result	Opposition Result	Opposition Result	Opposition Result	Opposition Result	Opposition Result	Opposition Result	Rank
Krisna Bayu	Men's Middleweight	Honorato (BRA); L 0001–1020	Did not advance			González (ESP); L 0100–1001	Did not advance			
Aprilia Marzuki	Women's Middleweight	Blavo (CIV); L	Did not advance							

== Sailing ==
Indonesia sent one man to compete in the Sailing venue at the 2000 Sydney Olympics.

Men

Athlete	Event	Race											Net points	Final rank
Athlete	Event	1	2	3	4	5	6	7	8	9	10	11	Net points	Final rank
I Gusti Made Oka Sulaksana	Men's Mistral	15	1	11	~~27~~	23	~~25~~	17	10	22	24	10	133	19th place

== Swimming ==
Athlete	Event	Heat		
Athlete	Event	Time	Rank	Note
Richard Sam Bera	Men's 50 metre freestyle	23.56	3 (Heat 5)	Did not advance
Richard Sam Bera	Men's 100 metre freestyle	51.52	5 (Heat 5)	Did not advance
Steven Chandra	Men's 1500 metre freestyle	16:10.98	5 (Heat 2)	Did not advance
Muhammad Akbar Nasution	Men's 200 metre breaststroke	02:23.81	6 (Heat 3)	Did not advance
Albert Sutanto	Men's 100 metre butterfly	56.50	7 (Heat 3)	Did not advance
Albert Sutanto	Men's 200 metre butterfly	02:05.13	8 (Heat 2)	Did not advance
Felix Sutanto	Men's 200 metre individual medley	02:09.77	4 (Heat 1)	Did not advance
Elsa Manora Nasution	Women's 100 metre backstroke	01:06.57	=5 (Heat 2)	Did not advance

== Table tennis ==
Men's singles

- Anton Suseno – 3 of 3, Group A

Men's doubles

- Anton Suseno and Ismu Harinto- Qualification Round Lost to Jorge Gambra and Augusto Morales (Chile)

== Taekwondo ==
Indonesia has qualified one taekwondo jin.

Athlete	Event	Round of 16	Quarterfinals	Semifinals	Repechage 1	Repechage 2	Final / BM	
Athlete	Event	Opposition Result	Opposition Result	Opposition Result	Opposition Result	Opposition Result	Opposition Result	Rank
Juana Wangsa Putri	Women's −49 kg	Bye	Poulsen (DEN); L 2–7	Did not advance				

== Tennis ==
Athlete	Event	Round of 64	Round of 32	Round of 16	Quarterfinals	Semifinals	Final / BM	
Athlete	Event	Opposition Score	Opposition Score	Opposition Score	Opposition Score	Opposition Score	Opposition Score	Rank
Wynne Prakusya	Women's singles	Gagliardi (SUI); L 4–6, 6^{2}–7^{6}	Did not advance					
Yayuk Basuki; Wynne Prakusya	Women's doubles	—N/a	Miyagi / Sugiyama (JPN); L 2–6, 7–5, 4–6	Did not advance				

== Weightlifting ==
Indonesia received their first ever medal in this competition, with one silver and two bronze medals in weightlifting.

Athlete	Event	Snatch		Clean & jerk		Total	Rank
Athlete	Event	Result	Rank	Result	Rank	Total	Rank
Raema Lisa Rumbewas	Flyweight	80.0	=3	105.0	1	185.0	2nd place, silver medalist(s)
Sri Indriyani	Flyweight	82.5	=1	100.0	=3	182.5	3rd place, bronze medalist(s)
Winarni Binti Slamet	Featherweight	90.0	3	112.5	3	202.5	3rd place, bronze medalist(s)

== See also ==
- 2000 Olympic Games
- 2000 Paralympic Games
- Indonesia at the Olympics
- Indonesia at the Paralympics
- Indonesia at the 2000 Summer Paralympics
