= Lili Zhou =

American badminton player

Lili Zhou 周丽丽
Personal information
- Born: Liliane Chow; February 2, 1980 (age 46)

Sport
- Country: United States
- Sport: Badminton
- Event: Women's singles

Women's singles
- BWF profile

Lili Zhou (born December 2, 1989) is a female badminton player from the United States of America.

From 2004 to 2006 she won three times the women's singles at the Boston Badminton Open. She played at the 2005 World Badminton Championships but lost in the first round to Eriko Hirose of Japan.

== Major Achievements ==
- 1993 Eleventh Sports Meeting of Guangzhou Singles 1st place
- 1993 Eleventh Sports Meeting of Guangzhou Doubles .2nd place
- 1994 Guangxi Jr. Badminton Championships Singles 1st place
- 1994 China National Contest of Excellent Players
- 1997 China National Jr. Badminton Championships Doubles 4thplace
- 1998 China National Badminton Winter Competition “Victory Cup” 1st place
- 1999 China National Badminton Championships of University 1st
- 2000 US Classic Doubles 1st place
- 2001 US Classic Doubles 1st place
- 2003 Bay Area Open 1st place
- 2004 Boston Open singles/ Mixed doubles 1st
- 2004 US Adult National Singles/ doubles 1st place
- 2004 US Open Singles 2nd place
- 2005 Honolulu Open Singles/ Doubles 1st place
- 2005 Boston Open Singles/ Doubles 1st place
- 2005 UBC Open Singles/Mixed 1st place
- 2005 YONEX International Championship 2005 1st place
- 2006 Boston open singles 1st place
- 2006 GGBC Open Singles 1st place
- 2007 Won the USA National Team Trials
- 2007 GGBC Open Singles 1st place
- 2008 USA Team Trial Singles 1st place
- 2008 U.S. Open Singles 1st Place
