= Kyle Hunter =

Canadian badminton player

Personal information
- Born: May 31, 1973 (age 53) Brantford, Ontario

Sport
- Country: Canada
- Sport: Badminton
Medal record
Men's badminton
Representing Canada
Bronze medal – third place	2003 Pan Am	Men's single
Bronze medal – third place	2003 Pan Am	Men's double

Kyle Hunter (born May 31, 1973) is a male badminton player from Canada who won a bronze medal in the 2003 Pan American Games in Men's Doubles with Mike Beres and in Men's Singles. He was born in Brantford, Ontario and grew up in the town of Paris, Ontario.

Kyle was also won the 2003 Canadian National Badminton Championships in Men's Doubles with Mike Beres.

Since 2007, Kyle has been the executive director for Badminton Canada.
