= Sarah MacMaster =

Canadian badminton player

Personal information
- Born: 4 July 1983 (age 43) Surrey, British Columbia, Canada

Sport
- Country: Canada
- Sport: Badminton
- Event: Women's doubles
Medal record
Badminton
Representing Canada
Pan American Games
| Bronze medal – third place | 2007 Rio de Janeiro | Women's doubles |
Pan Am Championships
| Bronze medal – third place | 2007 Calgary | Women's singles |

Sarah MacMaster (born 4 July 1983) is a Canadian former badminton player who competed in international level events. She is a bronze medal at the 2007 Pan American Games and a bronze medalist at the 2007 Pan Am Badminton Championships. Her doubles partner is Valerie Loker.
