= Badminton at the 2003 Pan American Games =

- Venue: UASD Pavilion
- Competitors: 73 from 11 nations

The Badminton Competition at the 2003 Pan American Games was held from August 1 to August 17, 2003 in Santo Domingo, Dominican Republic at the UASD Pavilion, which sat 1,700 for the games.

There were a total number of five events, singles and doubles for men and women, along with a mixed doubles event.

== Medal table ==
Rank	Nation	Gold	Silver	Bronze	Total
1	Canada	3	4	2	9
2	Jamaica	1	0	2	3
3	United States	1	0	1	2
4	Guatemala	0	1	1	2
5	Peru	0	0	4	4
Totals (5 entries)		5	5	10	20

== Medalists ==
Event	Gold	Silver	Bronze
Men's singles	Mike Beres; Canada	Andrew Dabeka; Canada	Kyle Hunter; Canada
Men's singles	Mike Beres; Canada	Andrew Dabeka; Canada	Pedro Yang; Guatemala
Women's singles	Nigella Saunders; Jamaica	Anna Rice; Canada	Lorena Blanco; Peru
Women's singles	Nigella Saunders; Jamaica	Anna Rice; Canada	Sandra Jimeno; Peru
Men's doubles	United States; Howard Bach; Kevin Han	Guatemala; Pedro Yang; Erick Anguiano	Canada; Mike Beres; Kyle Hunter
Men's doubles	United States; Howard Bach; Kevin Han	Guatemala; Pedro Yang; Erick Anguiano	Jamaica; Bradley Graham; Charles Pyne
Women's doubles	Canada; Charmaine Reid; Helen Nichol	Canada; Denyse Julien; Anna Rice	Peru; Lorena Blanco; Valeria Rivera
Women's doubles	Canada; Charmaine Reid; Helen Nichol	Canada; Denyse Julien; Anna Rice	Peru; Doriana Rivera; Sandra Jimeno
Mixed doubles	Canada; Philippe Bourret; Denyse Julien	Canada; Mike Beres; Jody Patrick	Jamaica; Charles Pyne; Nigella Saunders
Mixed doubles	Canada; Philippe Bourret; Denyse Julien	Canada; Mike Beres; Jody Patrick	United States; Raju Rai; Mesinee Mangkalakiri

== Participating nations ==
A total of 11 nations entered players in the badminton competitions, with a total of 73 athletes.

- Argentina (3)
- Barbados (4)
- Brazil (8)
- Canada (9)
- Dominican Republic (8)
- Guatemala (6)
- Jamaica (5)
- Peru (8)
- Suriname (4)
- Trinidad and Tobago (9)
- United States (9)
