= Badminton at the 1999 Pan American Games =

- Venue: Winnipeg Convention Centre
- Competitors: 62 from 13 nations

The Badminton Competition at the 1999 Pan American Games was held from July 23 to August 8, 1999 in Winnipeg, Manitoba, Canada. There was a total of five events. At the end of the tournament, the host country Canada won three gold medals in the men's, women's and mixed doubles, while the United States captured two golds in the men's and women's singles.

== Medal table ==
* Host nation (Canada)

Rank	Nation	Gold	Silver	Bronze	Total
1	Canada*	3	4	3	10
2	United States	2	1	2	5
3	Peru	0	0	3	3
4	Guatemala	0	0	1	1
4	Mexico	0	0	1	1
Totals (5 entries)		5	5	10	20

== Medalists ==
Event	Gold	Silver	Bronze
Men's singles	Kevin Han; United States	Stuart Arthur; Canada	Mario Carulla; Peru
Men's singles	Kevin Han; United States	Stuart Arthur; Canada	Pedro Yang; Guatemala
Women's singles	Yeping Tang; United States	Charmaine Reid; Canada	Denyse Julien; Canada
Women's singles	Yeping Tang; United States	Charmaine Reid; Canada	Kara Solmundson; Canada
Men's doubles	Canada; Brent Olynyk; Iain Sydie	United States; Howard Bach; Mark Manha	Canada; Mike Beres; Bryan Moody
Men's doubles	Canada; Brent Olynyk; Iain Sydie	United States; Howard Bach; Mark Manha	Mexico; Bernardo Monreal; Luis Lopezllera
Women's doubles	Canada; Robbyn Hermitage; Milaine Cloutier	Canada; Charmaine Reid; Denyse Julien	Peru; Adrienn Kocsis; Doriana Rivera
Women's doubles	Canada; Robbyn Hermitage; Milaine Cloutier	Canada; Charmaine Reid; Denyse Julien	United States; Stefanie Westerman; Katherne Zimmerman
Mixed doubles	Canada; Iain Sydie; Denyse Julien	Canada; Brent Olynyk; Robbyn Hermitage	Peru; Mario Carulla; Adrienn Kocsis
Mixed doubles	Canada; Iain Sydie; Denyse Julien	Canada; Brent Olynyk; Robbyn Hermitage	United States; Christopher Hales; Yeping Tang

== Participating nations ==
A total of 13 nations entered players in the badminton competitions, with a total of 62 athletes.

- Netherlands Antilles (2)
- Argentina (1)
- Barbados (3)
- Brazil (6)
- Canada (11)
- Cuba (3)
- Guatemala (2)
- Jamaica (4)
- Mexico (6)
- Peru (8)
- Suriname (3)
- Trinidad and Tobago (3)
- United States (10)
