= Lorena Blanco =

Peruvian badminton player (born 1977)

Medal record

Women's Badminton

Representing Peru

Pan American Games
Bronze medal – third place	2003 Santo Domingo	Singles
Bronze medal – third place	2003 Santo Domingo	Doubles

Lorena Blanco (born July 22, 1977) is a badminton player from Peru, who won two bronze medals at the 2003 Pan American Games.

She played badminton at the 2004 Summer Olympics, losing to Wang Chen of Hong Kong in the round of 32.

In 1996 she was triple champion at the South American Badminton Championships winning the women's singles, women's doubles (with Ximena Bellido) and mixed doubles (with Gustavo Salazar) events.
