= Badminton at the 2000 Summer Olympics =

Badminton at the Games of the XXVII Olympiad
- Venue: Pavilion 3, Sydney Olympic Park
- Dates: 17–23 September 2000
- No. of events: 5 (2 men, 2 women, 1 mixed)
- Competitors: 161 from 28 nations

Badminton at the 2000 Summer Olympics was held at the Pavilion 3, Sydney Olympic Park from 17 – 23 September. Both men and women competed in their own singles and doubles events and together they competed in a mixed doubles event.

== Medalists ==
| Event | Gold | Silver | Bronze |
|---|---|---|---|
| Men's singles | Ji Xinpeng; China | Hendrawan; Indonesia | Xia Xuanze; China |
| Men's doubles | Tony Gunawan and Candra Wijaya; Indonesia | Lee Dong-soo and Yoo Yong-sung; South Korea | Ha Tae-kwon and Kim Dong-moon; South Korea |
| Women's singles | Gong Zhichao; China | Camilla Martin; Denmark | Ye Zhaoying; China |
| Women's doubles | Ge Fei and Gu Jun; China | Huang Nanyan and Yang Wei; China | Gao Ling and Qin Yiyuan; China |
| Mixed doubles | Zhang Jun and Gao Ling; China | Tri Kusharyanto and Minarti Timur; Indonesia | Simon Archer and Joanne Goode; Great Britain |

== Medal table ==
| Rank | Nation | Gold | Silver | Bronze | Total |
|---|---|---|---|---|---|
| 1 | China | 4 | 1 | 3 | 8 |
| 2 | Indonesia | 1 | 2 | 0 | 3 |
| 3 | South Korea | 0 | 1 | 1 | 2 |
| 4 | Denmark | 0 | 1 | 0 | 1 |
| 5 | Great Britain | 0 | 0 | 1 | 1 |
| Totals (5 entries) | | 5 | 5 | 5 | 15 |

== Participating nations ==
A total of 28 nations participated in this event.

- Australia (7)
- Belgium (1)
- Bulgaria (4)
- Canada (6)
- China (17)
- Denmark (18)
- Finland (2)
- France (3)
- Germany (6)
- Great Britain (12)
- Hong Kong (4)
- India (2)
- Indonesia (19)
- Ireland (1)
- Japan (9)
- South Korea (12)
- Malaysia (6)
- Mauritius (5)
- Netherlands (8)
- Poland (3)
- Portugal (1)
- Russia (3)
- Slovenia (1)
- Chinese Taipei (5)
- Sweden (6)
- Thailand (6)
- Ukraine (3)
- United States (1)
