= Brent Olynyk =

Canadian badminton player (born 1971)

Medal record

Representing Canada

Men's Badminton

Pan American Games
Gold medal – first place	Winnipeg 1999	Doubles
Silver medal – second place	Winnipeg 1999	Mixed

Brent Olynyk (born December 7, 1971, in North Vancouver, British Columbia) is a badminton player from Canada, who won the gold medal in the men's doubles competition at the 1999 Pan American Games alongside Iain Sydie. He also took away silver from that tournament, won in the mixed doubles competition partnering Robbyn Hermitage. A resident of Calgary, Alberta, he represented Canada at the 2000 Summer Olympics.
