= Robbyn Hermitage =

Canadian badminton player (born 1970)

Medal record

Representing Canada

Women's badminton

Pan American Games
Gold medal – first place	Winnipeg 1999	Doubles
Silver medal – second place	Winnipeg 1999	Mixed

Robbyn Hermitage (born April 22, 1970 in Montreal, Quebec) is a badminton player from Canada, who won the gold medal in the women's doubles competition at the 1999 Pan American Games alongside Milaine Cloutier. She also took away silver from that tournament, winning in the mixed doubles competition partnering Brent Olynyk. A resident of Surrey, British Columbia, she represented Canada at the 2000 Summer Olympics.
