= Milaine Cloutier =

Canadian badminton player (born 1972)

Medal record

Representing Canada

Women's badminton

Pan American Games
Gold medal – first place	Winnipeg 1999	Doubles

Milaine Cloutier (born February 16, 1972, in Granby, Quebec) is a badminton player from Canada, who won the gold medal in the women's doubles competition at the 1999 Pan American Games alongside Robbyn Hermitage. A resident of Calgary, Alberta, she represented Canada at the 2000 Summer Olympics.
