= Mario Carulla =

Peruvian badminton player (born 1971)

Personal information
- Born: October 26, 1971 (age 54)
Medal record
Men's Badminton
Representing Peru
Pan American Games
| Bronze medal – third place | 1999 Winnipeg | Singles |

Mario Carulla Schultz (born October 26, 1971) is a retired male badminton player from Peru, who won the bronze medal in the men's singles competition and another bronze medal in mixed with Adrienn Kocsis at the 1999 Pan American Games in Winnipeg, Canada. Also a bronze medal in men's singles at the 1995 Pan American Games in Mar del Plata, Argentina. He represented his native country at the 1996 Summer Olympics in Atlanta, USA.
