= William Milroy (badminton) =

Canadian badminton player (born 1980)

William Milroy (born 11 September 1980) is a professional badminton player. A resident of Edmonton, he was a Men's Doubles Winner in the Canadian National Badminton Championships in each year from 2004 to 2009.
