= Iain Sydie =

Canadian badminton player (born 1969)

Medal record

Men's badminton

Representing Canada

Pan American Games
Silver medal – second place	Mar del Plata 1995	Singles
Gold medal – first place	Mar del Plata 1995	Doubles
Gold medal – first place	Winnipeg 1999	Doubles
Gold medal – first place	Winnipeg 1999	Mixed

Iain Sydie (born November 12, 1969, in North York, Ontario) is a badminton player from Canada, who won the silver medal in the inaugural men's singles competition at the 1995 Pan American Games. He also took away a gold from that tournament. A resident of Calgary, Alberta, he represented Canada at the 1996 Summer Olympics. Together with his mixed doubles partner Denyse Julien, they become the first North American players to gain a top ten world ranking in February 1998.
