= Mike Beres =

Canadian badminton player (born 1973)

Medal record

Men's badminton

Representing Canada

Pan American Games
Gold medal – first place	2003 Santo Domingo	Singles
Gold medal – first place	2007 Rio de Janeiro	Singles
Gold medal – first place	2007 Rio de Janeiro	Doubles
Silver medal – second place	2003 Santo Domingo	Mixed
Silver medal – second place	2007 Rio de Janeiro	Mixed
Bronze medal – third place	1999 Winnipeg	Doubles
Bronze medal – third place	2003 Santo Domingo	Doubles

Mike Beres (born May 13, 1973) is a male badminton player from Canada. He won the bronze medal in the men's doubles competition at the 1999 Pan American Games. He was born in Brantford, Ontario.

In 2001 and 2007, he won the Boston Badminton Open. Beres competed in badminton at the 2004 Summer Olympics in mixed doubles with partner Jody Patrick. They lost to Fredrik Bergström and Johanna Persson of Sweden in the round of 32.

He would later win gold medals in singles and doubles at the 2007 Pan American Games, as well as a silver in mixed Badminton with Valerie Loker. Beres has won 8 Canadian National Championships between 1998 and 2007, two of them in men's singles, four in men's doubles and two in mixed doubles.

Beres has also competed in the 2000 Olympics and qualified for the August 2008 Olympic Games in Beijing for mixed doubles. Beres was coached by Edith Hayman, a former Ottawa District Badminton Association (ODBA) champion.

Mike Beres currently resides in Ottawa, Ontario where he occasionally frequents at the RA Centre, a badminton training/playing facility, which is an affiliated member of the ODBA. However, he has officially retired after playing badminton for Canada in the 2008 Summer Olympics.
