= 2007 U.S. Open Grand Prix =

Tournament details
- Dates: August 27, 2007 – September 1, 2007
- Edition: 45th
- Level: Grand Prix
- Competitors: 239 from 30 nations
- Total prize money: US$50,000
- Venue: Orange County Badminton Club
- Location: Orange, California, United States

Champions
- Men's singles: (Malaysia) Lee Tsuen Seng
- Women's singles: (South Korea) Jun Jae-youn
- Men's doubles: (Japan) Keita Masuda (Japan) Tadashi Ōtsuka
- Women's doubles: (Japan) Miyuki Maeda (Japan) Satoko Suetsuna
- Mixed doubles: (Japan) Keita Masuda (Japan) Miyuki Maeda

The 2007 U.S. Open Grand Prix was a badminton tournament which took place in Orange, California, United States from 27 August to 1 September 2007. It had a total purse of $50,000.

== Tournament ==
The 2007 U.S. Open Grand Prix was the fifth tournament of the 2007 BWF Grand Prix Gold and Grand Prix and also part of the U.S. Open championships which has been held since 1954. This tournament was organized by the USA Badminton and sanctioned by the BWF.

=== Venue ===
This international tournament was held at Orange County Badminton Club in Orange, California, United States.

=== Point distribution ===
Below is the point distribution for each phase of the tournament based on the BWF points system for the BWF Grand Prix event.

Winner	Runner-up	3/4	5/8	9/16	17/32	33/64	65/128	129/256	257/512	513/1024
5,500	4,680	3,850	3,030	2,110	1,290	510	240	100	45	30

=== Prize money ===
The total prize money for this tournament was US$50,000. Distribution of prize money was in accordance with BWF regulations.

Event	Winner	Finals	Semi-finals	Quarter-finals	Last 16
Singles	$3,750	$1,900	$725	$300	$175
Doubles	$3,950	$1,900	$700	$362.5	$187.5

== Men's singles ==
=== Seeds ===
1. (Japan) Shōji Satō (third round)
2. (Malaysia) Lee Tsuen Seng (champion)
3. (Malaysia) Sairul Amar Ayob (third round)
4. (Wales) Richard Vaughan (semi-finals)
5. (Canada) Andrew Dabeka (semi-finals)
6. (Japan) Sho Sasaki (quarter-finals)
7. (Canada) Bobby Milroy (third round)
8. (New Zealand) John Moody (quarter-finals)

=== Finals ===
Semi-finals
5	(Canada) Andrew Dabeka	16	19
(Japan) Yousuke Nakanishi	21	21
4	(Wales) Richard Vaughan	19	17
2	(Malaysia) Lee Tsuen Seng	21	21

Final
(Japan) Yousuke Nakanishi	14	10
2	(Malaysia) Lee Tsuen Seng	21	21

=== Top half ===
==== Section 1 ====
First Round
(Republic of Ireland) S Evans	w	/	o
PFQ	(United States) R Sou
Q2	(United States) S Rossi	1^{r}
(Japan) K Saeki	7
(Philippines) K Asuncion	21	21
(Croatia) N Rihtar	7	15
Q4	(United States) ZW Qin	12	13
(Brazil) G Pardo	21	21

Second Round
1	(Japan) S Satō	21	21
(Canada) K Foley	8	10
(Republic of Ireland) S Evans	21	21
(Japan) K Saeki	11	17
5	(Canada) A Dabeka	19	21	21
PFQ	(Canada) D Snider	21	14	16
(Philippines) K Asuncion	21	21
(Brazil) G Pardo	14	12

Third Round
1	(Japan) S Satō	15	14
(Republic of Ireland) S Evans	21	21
5	(Canada) A Dabeka	21	24
(Philippines) K Asuncion	11	22

Quarter-finals
(Republic of Ireland) S Evans	14	21	22
5	(Canada) A Dabeka	21	10	24

==== Section 2 ====
First Round
(Indonesia) L de Pauw	21	21
(Iran) K Mehrabi	13	13
(Japan) Y Nakanishi	21	23
(United States) E Go	8	21
(France) S Maunoury	21	21
(United States) N Jinadasa	17	16
(Japan) K Tago	19	21	21
(Spain) P Abián	21	17	10

Second Round
3	(Malaysia) S A Ayob	21	22
(Australia) S Gomez	12	20
(Indonesia) L de Pauw	'21	16	17
(Japan) Y Nakanishi	7	21	21
8	(New Zealand) J Moody	21	21
(United States) M Fogarty	8	11
(France) S Maunoury	21	12	22
(Japan) K Tago	12	21	20

Third Round
3	(Malaysia) S A Ayob	19	15
(Japan) Y Nakanishi	21	21
8	(New Zealand) J Moody	21	21
(France) S Maunoury	7	15

Quarter-finals
(Japan) Y Nakanishi	21	21
8	(New Zealand) J Moody	13	14

=== Bottom half ===
==== Section 3 ====
First Round
PFQ	(United States) D Schoppe	3	6
(Vietnam) Nguyễn T M	21	21
(Indonesia) A Wijaya	21	10
(Germany) R Spitko	23	21
(Austria) C Smola	11	6
(Spain) J A Crespo	21	21
Q1	(United States) R Hsia	5	8
(Spain) C Longo	21	21

Second Round
(Vietnam) Nguyễn T M	21	21
(Germany) R Spitko	16	9
(France) B Leverdez	21	9	5
7	(Canada) B Milroy	15	21	21
(Spain) J A Crespo	21	21	2
(Spain) C Longo	17	23	21
(Canada) S Wojcikiewicz	11	15
4	(Wales) R Vaughan	21	21

Third Round
(Vietnam) Nguyễn T M	21	21
7	(Canada) B Milroy	18	18
(Spain) C Longo	17	19
4	(Wales) R Vaughan	21	21

Quarter-finals
(Vietnam) Nguyễn T M	20	21	16
4	(Wales) R Vaughan	22	8	21

==== Section 4 ====
First Round
(Portugal) M Vasconcelos	18	29	21
(Czech Republic) J Fröhlich	21	27	11
(Peru) R Pacheco
(United States) R Rai	w	/	o
(Chinese Taipei) Hsieh Y-h	21	21
PFQ	(United States) B Su	9	6
PFQ	(Italy) M Garrido	8	16
(Slovenia) L Petrič	21	21

Second Round
(Portugal) M Vasconcelos	20	19
(United States) R Rai	22	21
(Nigeria) A Ogumseye
6	(Japan) S Sasaki	w	/	o
(Chinese Taipei) Hsieh Y-h	21	21
(Slovenia) L Petrič	15	14
Q3	(Vietnam) Nguyễn Q M	9	10
2	(Malaysia) Lee T S	21	21

Third Round
(United States) R Rai	14	6
6	(Japan) S Sasaki	21	21
(Chinese Taipei) Hsieh Y-h	17	11
2	(Malaysia) Lee T S	21	21

Quarter-finals
6	(Japan) S Sasaki	13	17
2	(Malaysia) Lee T S	21	21

== Women's singles ==
=== Seeds ===
1. (Canada) Anna Rice (quarter-finals)
2. (Japan) Yu Hirayama (second round)
3. (Chinese Taipei) Pai Min-jie (semi-finals)
4. (Italy) Agnese Allegrini (quarter-finals)
5. (England) Jill Pittard (first round)
6. (England) Elizabeth Cann (semi-finals)
7. (Japan) Chie Umezu (second round)
8. (Japan) Kanako Yonekura (quarter-finals)

=== Finals ===
Semi-finals
(South Korea) Lee Yun-hwa	21	21
3	(Chinese Taipei) Pai Min-jie	7	17
6	(England) Elizabeth Cann	10	17
(South Korea) Jun Jae-youn	21	21

Final
(South Korea) Lee Yun-hwa	18	16
(South Korea) Jun Jae-youn	21	21

=== Top half ===
==== Section 1 ====
First Round
1	(Canada) A Rice	21	21
(United States) L Todt	13	13
(Mexico) D Angulo	14	21	17
(United States) S Pohl	21	17	21
5	(England) J Pittard	17	13
(South Korea) Lee Y-h	21	21
(Portugal) F Lamy	14	17
Q4	(South Korea) Oh S-k	21	21

Second Round
1	(Canada) A Rice	21	21
(United States) S Pohl	14	8
(South Korea) Lee Y-h	21	21
Q4	(South Korea) Oh S-k	12	15

Quarter-finals
1	(Canada) A Rice	13	13
(South Korea) Lee Y-h	21	21

==== Section 2 ====
First Round
3	(Chinese Taipei) Pai M-j	21	21
(Bulgaria) R Kilkenny	11	14
(United States) Chen K-y	21	20	21
(Spain) Y Martínez	8	22	13
7	(Japan) C Umezu	21	21
(Canada) S MacMaster	7	6
Q3	(Philippines) Wang LL	17	21	21
(United States) J Subandhi	21	19	10

Second Round
3	(Chinese Taipei) Pai M-j	21	21
(United States) Chen K-y	7	12
7	(Japan) C Umezu	19	20
Q3	(Philippines) Wang LL	21	21

Quarter-finals
3	(Chinese Taipei) Pai M-j	21	21
Q3	(Philippines) Wang LL	14	15

=== Bottom half ===
==== Section 3 ====
First Round
(Slovenia) M Kersnik	21	21
PFQ	(United States) R Menchaca	5	9
(Canada) C Reid	7	13
6	(England) E Cann	21	21
(Portugal) A Moura	22	21
Q1	(United States) T Hoang	20	15
(United States) J Coleman	7	10
4	(Italy) A Allegrini	21	21

Second Round
(Slovenia) M Kersnik	9	11
6	(England) E Cann	21	'21
(Portugal) A Moura	5	13
4	(Italy) A Allegrini	21	21

Quarter-finals
6	(England) E Cann	21	21
4	(Italy) A Allegrini	18	10

==== Section 4 ====
First Round
(Republic of Ireland) C Magee	w	/	o
PFQ	(United States) LL Zhou
(United States) E Lee	17	11
8	(Japan) K Yonekura	21	21
(South Korea) Jun J-y	21	21
(Japan) M Fujii	17	11
Q2	(United States) P Phongasavithas	4	6
2	(Japan) Y Hirayama	21	21

Second Round
(Republic of Ireland) C Magee	9	17
8	(Japan) K Yonekura	21	21
(South Korea) Jun J-y	21	21
2	(Japan) Y Hirayama	17	8

Quarter-finals
8	(Japan) K Yonekura	10	21
(South Korea) Jun J-y	21	23

== Men's doubles ==
=== Seeds ===
1. (Japan) Shintaro Ikeda / Shuichi Sakamoto (first round)
2. (Japan) Keita Masuda / Tadashi Ōtsuka (champions)
3. (Germany) Michael Fuchs / Roman Spitko (quarter-finals)
4. (Canada) Mike Beres / William Milroy (quarter-finals)
5. (Germany) Jochen Cassel / Thomas Tesche (second round)
6. (United States) Howard Bach / Khan Malaythong (final)
7. (United States) Tony Gunawan / Raju Rai (semi-finals)
8. (Japan) Keishi Kawaguchi / Naoki Kawamae (semi-finals)

=== Finals ===
Semi-finals
6	(United States) Howard Bach (United States) Khan Malaythong	21	16	21
7	(United States) Tony Gunawan (United States) Raju Rai	18	21	16
8	(Japan) Keishi Kawaguchi (Japan) Naoki Kawamae	16	18
2	(Japan) Keita Masuda (Japan) Tadashi Ōtsuka	21	21

Final
6	(United States) Howard Bach (United States) Khan Malaythong	18	11
2	(Japan) Keita Masuda (Japan) Tadashi Ōtsuka	21	21

=== Top half ===
==== Section 1 ====
First Round
1	(Japan) S Ikeda (Japan) S Sakamoto	14	19
(Vietnam) Nguyễn Q M (Vietnam) Trần T H	21	21
(United States) J Kasuga (United States) G Rosas
(Chinese Taipei) Chien Y-h (Chinese Taipei) Lin Y-l	w	/	o
6	(United States) H Bach (United States) K Malaythong	w	/	o
(Brazil) G Pardo (Portugal) M Vasconcelos
Q3	(United States) H Shu (United States) R Sou	21	23
(United States) A Situmorang (United States) T Wijaya	10	21

Second Round
(Vietnam) Nguyễn Q M (Vietnam) Trần T H	9	18
(Chinese Taipei) Chien Y-h (Chinese Taipei) Lin Y-l	21	21
6	(United States) H Bach (United States) K Malaythong	21	21
Q3	(United States) H Shu (United States) R Sou	12	8

Quarter-finals
(Chinese Taipei) Chien Y-h (Chinese Taipei) Lin Y-l	16	15
6	(United States) H Bach (United States) K Malaythong	21	21

==== Section 2 ====
First Round
3	(Germany) M Fuchs (Germany) R Spitko	21	21
(United States) R Chong (United States) M Do	12	15
PFQ	(United States) K Emerick (United States) J Lee	21	21
(Philippines) D Bautista (Philippines) B Chan	10	10
7	(United States) T Gunawan (United States) R Rai	21	21
(Canada) K Holoboff (Canada) T Ng	6	5
Q1	(Japan) N Hirata (Japan) T Yone	21	21
(Canada) T McKee (Canada) D Snider	12	9

Second Round
3	(Germany) M Fuchs (Germany) R Spitko	21	21
PFQ	(United States) K Emerick (United States) J Lee	11	10
7	(United States) T Gunawan (United States) R Rai	21	21
Q1	(Japan) N Hirata (Japan) T Yone	14	19

Quarter-finals
3	(Germany) M Fuchs (Germany) R Spitko	13	10
7	(United States) T Gunawan (United States) R Rai	21	21

=== Bottom half ===
==== Section 3 ====
First Round
(United States) D Gouw (United States) K Chandra	16	10
Q4	(Philippines) K T Ming (Philippines) R Wijaya	21	21
(United States) B Chau (United States) S Phan	7	7
8	(Japan) K Kawaguchi (Japan) N Kawamae	21	21
PFQ	(United States) T Nguyen (United States) T La	17	21	15
(United States) A Ali (United States) T Shear	21	19	21
(United States) M Fogarty (United States) D Schoppe	9	13
4	(Canada) M Beres (Canada) W Milroy	21	21

Second Round
Q4	(Philippines) K T Ming (Philippines) R Wijaya	10	17
8	(Japan) K Kawaguchi (Japan) N Kawamae	21	21
(United States) A Ali (United States) T Shear	15	9
4	(Canada) M Beres (Canada) W Milroy	21	21

Quarter-finals
8	(Japan) K Kawaguchi (Japan) N Kawamae	21	21
4	(Canada) M Beres (Canada) W Milroy	13	18

==== Section 4 ====
First Round
(United States) B Chen (United States) R Setiadi	11	11
Q2	(United States) E Go (United States) H Haryanto	21	21
(United States) A Todt (United States) A Tran	11	6
5	(Germany) J Cassel (Germany) T Tesche	21	21
PFQ	(Chinese Taipei) Chen H-l (Chinese Taipei) Lin Y-j	21	21
PFQ	(United States) Y H Chan (United States) E Kuo	8	4
(United States) S Fujinami (United States) C Yoneyama	8	12
2	(Japan) K Masuda (Japan) T Ōtsuka	21	21

Second Round
Q2	(United States) E Go (United States) H Haryanto	9	21	21
5	(Germany) J Cassel (Germany) T Tesche	21	14	15
PFQ	(Chinese Taipei) Chen H-l (Chinese Taipei) Lin Y-j	12	12
2	(Japan) K Masuda (Japan) T Ōtsuka	21	21

Quarter-finals
Q2	(United States) E Go (United States) H Haryanto	8	15
2	(Japan) K Masuda (Japan) T Ōtsuka	21	21

== Women's doubles ==
=== Seeds ===
1. (Japan) Aki Akao / Tomomi Matsuda (final)
2. (Japan) Miyuki Maeda / Satoko Suetsuna (champions)
3. (Canada) Fiona McKee / Charmaine Reid (second round)
4. (Republic of Ireland) Bing Huang / Chloe Magee (second round)

=== Finals ===
Semi-finals
1	(Japan) Aki Akao (Japan) Tomomi Matsuda	21	21
(South Korea) Joo Hyun-hee (South Korea) Oh Seul-ki	17	7
(South Korea) Ha Jung-eun (South Korea) Hwang Yu-mi	21	18	18
2	(Japan) Miyuki Maeda (Japan) Satoko Suetsuna	16	21	21

Final
1	(Japan) Aki Akao (Japan) Tomomi Matsuda	21	14	15
2	(Japan) Miyuki Maeda (Japan) Satoko Suetsuna	16	21	21

=== Top half ===
==== Section 1 ====
First Round
(Malaysia) L Cheah (Malaysia) Tee J Y
(United States) Rulan Yeh (United States) Rulien Yeh	w	/	o
(Japan) M Kanagami (Japan) N Okuma	21	21
(United States) M Kaneda (United States) J Sidlauskaite	4	7
(United States) M Ho (United States) A Wen	9	8
(Canada) S MacMaster (Canada) T Sun	21	21

Second Round
1	(Japan) A Akao (Japan) T Matsuda	21	21
(United States) Rulan Yeh (United States) Rulien Yeh	9	5
(Japan) M Kanagami (Japan) N Okuma	21	21
(Canada) S MacMaster (Canada) T Sun	14	15

Quarter-finals
1	(Japan) A Akao (Japan) T Matsuda	21	21
(Japan) M Kanagami (Japan) N Okuma	14	15

==== Section 2 ====
First Round
(South Korea) Joo H-h (South Korea) Oh S-k	21	21
(United States) S Jinadasa (United States) D Ng	9	6
(United States) Chen K-y (United States) J Subandhi	10	15
(Malaysia) Haw C H (Malaysia) Lim P S	21	21
(United States) E Lee (United States) M Mangkalakiri	18	21	22
(Malaysia) M Santoso (Philippines) K Asuncion	21	16	24

Second Round
3	(Canada) F McKee (Canada) C Reid	13	9
(South Korea) Joo H-h (South Korea) Oh S-k	21	21
(Malaysia) Haw C H (Malaysia) Lim P S	21	0
(Malaysia) M Santoso (Philippines) K Asuncion	12	0^{r}

Quarter-finals
(South Korea) Joo H-h (South Korea) Oh S-k	21	21
(Malaysia) Haw C H (Malaysia) Lim P S	13	15

=== Bottom half ===
==== Section 3 ====
First Round
(South Korea) Jun J-y (South Korea) Lee Y-h	19	21	21
(United States) J Lee (United States) Peng Y	21	14	8
(Malaysia) Ang L P (Malaysia) Chor H Y	21	21
(Canada) V Loker (Canada) H Nichol	9	9
(United States) T Hoang (United States) C N Ketpura	8	5
(South Korea) Ha J-e (South Korea) Hwang Y-m	21	21

Second Round
(South Korea) Jun J-y (South Korea) Lee Y-h	21	21
(Malaysia) Ang L P (Malaysia) Chor H Y	4	17
(South Korea) Ha J-e (South Korea) Hwang Y-m	21	21
4	(Republic of Ireland) B Huang (Republic of Ireland) C Magee	17	8

Quarter-finals
(South Korea) Jun J-y (South Korea) Lee Y-h	13	14
(South Korea) Ha J-e (South Korea) Hwang Y-m	21	21

==== Section 4 ====
First Round
(United States) P Phongasavithas (United States) V Phongasavithas	w	/	o
(Malaysia) Goh L Y (Malaysia) Ng H L
(Italy) D Angulo (Italy) V Montero
(United States) R Menchaca (United States) V Viktoriya	w	/	o
(Chinese Taipei) Hsieh P-c (Chinese Taipei) Lee T-a	21	21
(United States) J Coleman (United States) L Todt	15	16

Second Round
(United States) P Phongasavithas (United States) V Phongasavithas	21	21	21
(United States) R Menchaca (United States) V Viktoriya	23	12	9
(Chinese Taipei) Hsieh P-c (Chinese Taipei) Lee T-a	18	18
2	(Japan) M Maeda (Japan) S Suetsuna	21	21

Quarter-finals
(United States) P Phongasavithas (United States) V Phongasavithas	7	1
2	(Japan) M Maeda (Japan) S Suetsuna	21	21

== Mixed doubles ==
=== Seeds ===
1. (South Korea) Han Sang-hoon / Hwang Yu-mi (withdrew)
2. (Japan) Keita Masuda / Miyuki Maeda (champions)
3. (United States) Howard Bach / Eva Lee (final)
4. (Philippines) Kennevic Asuncion / Kennie Asuncion (semi-finals)
5. (Canada) Mike Beres / Valerie Loker (quarter-finals)
6. (Malaysia) Lim Khim Wah / Ng Hui Lin (withdrew)
7. (United States) Khan Malaythong / Mesinee Mangkalakiri (second round)
8. (Japan) Tadashi Ōtsuka / Satoko Suetsuna (quarter-finals)

=== Finals ===
Semi-finals
(United States) Tony Gunawan (Philippines) Minarti Timur	21	21	15
3	(United States) Howard Bach (United States) Eva Lee	19	23	21
4	(Philippines) Kennevic Asuncion (Philippines) Kennie Asuncion	14	13
2	(Japan) Keita Masuda (Japan) Miyuki Maeda	21	21

Final
3	(United States) Howard Bach (United States) Eva Lee	21	11	19
2	(Japan) Keita Masuda (Japan) Miyuki Maeda	19	21	21

=== Top half ===
==== Section 1 ====
First Round
PFQ	(United States) B Belayneh (United States) M Ho
(United States) P Koo (United States) LL Zhou
(United States) T Gunawan (Philippines) M Timur	21	21
(United States) P Chew (United States) C N Ketpura	16	18
PFQ	(Vietnam) Trần T H (Vietnam) T Hoang	21	21
(United States) T La (United States) A Wen	13	11
(United States) S Rossi (United States) R Menchaca	9	6
(Philippines) R Wijaya (Philippines) Wang LL	21	21

Second Round
PFQ	(United States) B Belayneh (United States) M Ho	10	10
(United States) T Gunawan (Philippines) M Timur	21	21
PFQ	(Vietnam) Trần T H (Vietnam) T Hoang	19	10
(Philippines) R Wijaya (Philippines) Wang LL	21	21

Quarter-finals
(United States) T Gunawan (Philippines) M Timur	21	21
(Philippines) R Wijaya (Philippines) Wang LL	12	12

==== Section 2 ====
First Round
3	(United States) H Bach (United States) E Lee	21	21
(Canada) W Milroy (Canada) T Sun	14	15
(United States) C Lin (United States) R Wang	17	9
Q1	(United States) C Kowi (United States) M Santoso	21	21
8	(Japan) T Ōtsuka (Japan) S Suetsuna	21	21
(United States) N Jinadasa (United States) S Jinadasa	9	9
PFQ	(Mexico) M Garrido (Mexico) D Angulo	14	11
(Chinese Taipei) Lin Y-j (Chinese Taipei) Lee T-a	21	'21

Second Round
3	(United States) H Bach (United States) E Lee	21	18	21
Q1	(United States) C Kowi (United States) M Santoso	14	21	12
8	(Japan) T Ōtsuka (Japan) S Suetsuna	21	12	21
(Chinese Taipei) Lin Y-j (Chinese Taipei) Lee T-a	18	21	11

Quarter-finals
3	(United States) H Bach (United States) E Lee	21	21
8	(Japan) T Ōtsuka (Japan) S Suetsuna	12	14

=== Bottom half ===
==== Section 3 ====
First Round
(Canada) K Holoboff (Canada) F McKee	21	16	21
(United States) A Ali (United States) L Todt	13	21	15
(United States) A Tran (United States) Q M Wu	10	12
5	(Canada) M Beres (Canada) V Loker	21	21
(United States) A Setiadi (United States) D Ng	21	21
(Canada) K Foley (Canada) H Nichol	18	16
PFQ	(Chinese Taipei) Lin Y-l (Chinese Taipei) Pai M-j	15	17
4	(Philippines) Kennevic Asuncion (Philippines) Kennie Asuncion	21	21

Second Round
(Canada) K Holoboff (Canada) F McKee	12	19
5	(Canada) M Beres (Canada) V Loker	21	21
(United States) A Setiadi (United States) D Ng	18	15
4	(Philippines) Kennevic Asuncion (Philippines) Kennie Asuncion	21	21

Quarter-finals
5	(Canada) M Beres (Canada) V Loker	9	17
4	(Philippines) Kennevic Asuncion (Philippines) Kennie Asuncion	21	21

==== Section 4 ====
First Round
Q4	(United States) H Haryanto (United States) Peng Y	21	21
(United States) Q Chau (United States) Rulien Yeh	11	11
Q3	(United States) M Do (United States) C Tam
7	(United States) K Malaythong (United States) M Mangkalakiri	w	/	o
(Chinese Taipei) Chen H-l (Chinese Taipei) Hsieh P-c	21	21
(United States) V Nguy (United States) Rulien Yeh	8	11
Q2	(Nepal) P Paneru (Nepal) S Shrestha	5	6
2	(Japan) K Masuda (Japan) M Maeda	21	21

Second Round
Q4	(United States) H Haryanto (United States) Peng Y	22	21
7	(United States) K Malaythong (United States) M Mangkalakiri	20	9
(Chinese Taipei) Chen H-l (Chinese Taipei) Hsieh P-c	22	18
2	(Japan) K Masuda (Japan) M Maeda	24	21

Quarter-finals
Q4	(United States) H Haryanto (United States) Peng Y	21	19	13
2	(Japan) K Masuda (Japan) M Maeda	16	21	21

Preceded by 2007 Philippines Open Grand Prix Gold	2007 BWF Grand Prix Gold and Grand Prix; 2007 BWF season	Succeeded by 2007 Chinese Taipei Open Grand Prix Gold
