= Raju Rai =

Raju Rai , Indian Youtuber) News REPORTER, Social media Content Creater

Rajiv Kumar Rai
Personal information
- Born: Rajiv Kumar Rai; February 3, 1983 (age 43) Lawrenceville, Georgia, United States
- Height: 5 ft 10 in (178 cm)
- Weight: 180 lb (82 kg)

Sport
- Country: United States
- Sport: Badminton
- Handedness: Right
- Coached by: Tony Gunawan
- BWF profile
Medal record
Men's badminton
Representing United States
Pan American Games
Bronze medal – third place	2003 Santo Domingo	Mixed doubles
Pan Am Championships
Gold medal – first place	2005 Bridgetown	Men's doubles
Silver medal – second place	2005 Bridgetown	Mixed team
Bronze medal – third place	2005 Bridgetown	Men's singles

Rajiv Kumar Rai (born February 3, 1983) is an American badminton player of Indian descent. He won a bronze medal, along with his partner Mesinee Mangkalakiri, in the mixed doubles at the 2003 Pan American Games in Santo Domingo, Dominican Republic. Rai is also a member of Orange County Badminton Club in Anaheim, California, and is coached and trained by former Olympic doubles champion Tony Gunawan (2000).

Rai qualified for the men's singles at the 2008 Summer Olympics in Beijing, after he was ranked sixty-eighth in the world, and awarded an entry as one of the top 38 seeded players by the Badminton World Federation. He received a bye for the second preliminary round before losing out to Finland's Ville Lång, with a score of 9–21 and 16–21.

Rai is a former coach of Bellevue Badminton Club, and also, an athlete director for the U.S. national badminton team. He, along with fellow Olympian Bob Malaythong, currently coaches the top junior players in the United States at Synergy Badminton Academy in Menlo Park, California.

== Achievements ==
=== Pan American Games ===
Mixed doubles
Year	Venue	Partner	Opponent	Score	Result
2003	UASD Pavilion; Santo Domingo, Dominican Republic	(United States) Mesinee Mangkalakiri	(Canada) Philippe Bourret (Canada) Denyse Julien	8–15, 7–15	Bronze

=== Pan Am Championships ===
Men's singles
Year	Venue	Opponent	Score	Result
2005	Bridgetown, Barbados	(Canada) Andrew Dabeka	2–15, 9–15	Bronze

Men's doubles
Year	Venue	Partner	Opponent	Score	Result
2005	Bridgetown, Barbados	(United States) Bob Malaythong	(Canada) Mike Beres (Canada) William Milroy	11–15, 15–8, 15–6	Gold

=== BWF Grand Prix ===
The BWF Grand Prix has two level such as Grand Prix and Grand Prix Gold. It is a series of badminton tournaments, sanctioned by Badminton World Federation (BWF) since 2007.

Men's doubles
Year	Tournament	Partner	Opponent	Score	Result
2008	U.S Open	(United States) Halim Haryanto	(United States) Howard Bach (United States) Bob Malaythong	14–21, 19–21	(silver) Runner-up

BWF Grand Prix Gold tournament
BWF Grand Prix tournament

=== BWF International Challenge/Series ===
Men's singles
Year	Tournament	Opponent	Score	Result
2008	Nigeria International	(Portugal) Alexandre Paixão	13–21, 14–21	(silver) Runner-up
2008	Giraldilla International	(Belgium) Yuhan Tan	19–21, 19–21	(silver) Runner-up
2007	Hellas International	(Germany) Marc Zwiebler	14–21, 16–21	(silver) Runner-up
2007	Carebaco International	(France) Brice Leverdez	12–21, 17–21	(silver) Runner-up
2004	Carebaco International	(Canada) Andrew Dabeka	9–15, 7–15	(silver) Runner-up

Men's doubles
Year	Tournament	Partner	Opponent	Score	Result
2005	Southern Carolina International	(United States) Bob Malaythong	(United States) Howard Bach (United States) Tony Gunawan	0–1 Retired	(silver) Runner-up
2004	Carebaco International	(United States) Bob Malaythong	(Canada) Alexandre Tremblay (Canada) Tom Lucas Picher	15–5, 15–7	(gold) Winner
2004	New Zealand International	(United States) Bob Malaythong	(Japan) Shuichi Nakao (Japan) Shuichi Sakamoto	3–15, 15–10, 12–15	(silver) Runner-up

Mixed doubles
Year	Tournament	Partner	Opponent	Score	Result
2005	Southern Carolina International	(United States) Mesinee Mangkalakiri	(Canada) Philippe Bourret (Canada) Denyse Julien	6–15, 9–15	(silver) Runner-up

BWF International Challenge tournament
BWF International Series tournament
BWF Future Series tournament
