= 2005 Pan Am Badminton Championships =

Tournament details
- Dates: 27 March – 1 April
- Nations: 7
- Venue: Wildey Gymnasium
- Location: Bridgetown, Barbados

Champions
- Men's singles: (Canada) Andrew Dabeka
- Women's singles: (Canada) Charmaine Reid
- Men's doubles: (United States) Khan Malaythong (United States) Raju Rai
- Women's doubles: (Canada) Helen Nichol (Canada) Charmaine Reid
- Mixed doubles: (Canada) Mike Beres (Canada) Jody Patrick

The 2005 Pan Am Badminton Championships was the twelfth edition of the Pan American Badminton Championships. The tournament was held from 27 March to 1 April at the Wildey Gymnasium in Bridgetown, Barbados. Seven countries competed in the championships.

The Canadian mixed team won the mixed team championships after defeating the United States in the final. The team also finished first in the medal tally with five golds, five silvers and five bronzes. Hosts Barbados did not win a medal in the championships.

== Medal summary ==
=== Medalists ===
Event	Gold	Silver	Bronze
Men's singles	(Canada) Andrew Dabeka	(Canada) Bobby Milroy	(Guatemala) Pedro Yang
Men's singles	(Canada) Andrew Dabeka	(Canada) Bobby Milroy	(United States) Raju Rai
Women's singles	(Canada) Charmaine Reid	(Canada) Anna Rice	(Canada) Jody Patrick
Women's singles	(Canada) Charmaine Reid	(Canada) Anna Rice	(Canada) Denyse Julien
Men's doubles	(United States) Khan Malaythong (United States) Raju Rai	(Canada) Mike Beres (Canada) William Milroy	(Canada) Jean Philippe Goyette (Canada) Philippe Bourret
Men's doubles	(United States) Khan Malaythong (United States) Raju Rai	(Canada) Mike Beres (Canada) William Milroy	(Peru) Andrés Corpancho (Peru) Javier Jimeno
Women's doubles	(Canada) Helen Nichol (Canada) Charmaine Reid	(Canada) Milaine Cloutier (Canada) Denyse Julien	(Peru) Claudia Rivero (Peru) Cristina Aicardi
Women's doubles	(Canada) Helen Nichol (Canada) Charmaine Reid	(Canada) Milaine Cloutier (Canada) Denyse Julien	(Canada) Amélie Felx (Canada) Florence Lavoie
Mixed doubles	(Canada) Mike Beres (Canada) Jody Patrick	(Canada) Philippe Bourret (Canada) Helen Nichol	(United States) Marc Lai (United States) Melinda Keszthelyi
Mixed doubles	(Canada) Mike Beres (Canada) Jody Patrick	(Canada) Philippe Bourret (Canada) Helen Nichol	(Canada) William Milroy (Canada) Tammy Sun
Mixed team	Canada; Mike Beres; Philippe Bourret; Andrew Dabeka; Bobby Milroy; William Milroy; Milaine Cloutier; Denyse Julien; Helen Nichol; Jody Patrick; Charmaine Reid; Anna Rice	United States; Marc Lai; Khan Malaythong; Raju Rai; Jennifer Coleman; Melinda Keszthelyi; Eva Lee; Mesinee Mangkalakiri	Peru; Andrés Corpancho; Juan José Espinosa; Javier Jimeno; Rodrigo Pacheco; Christina Aicardi; Claudia Rivero; Valeria Rivero

=== Medal table ===
* Host nation (Barbados)

Rank	Nation	Gold	Silver	Bronze	Total
1	Canada	5	5	5	15
2	United States	1	1	2	4
3	Peru	0	0	3	3
4	Guatemala	0	0	1	1
Totals (4 entries)		6	6	11	23

== Individual results ==
=== Men's singles ===
Semi-finals
(Canada) Bobby Milroy	15	15
(Guatemala) Pedro Yang	2	8
(United States) Raju Rai	2	9
(Canada) Andrew Dabeka	15	15

Final
(Canada) Bobby Milroy	9	12
(Canada) Andrew Dabeka	15	15

=== Women's singles ===
Semi-finals
(Canada) Anna Rice	11	11
(Canada) Jody Patrick	2	0
(Canada) Denyse Julien	8	4
(Canada) Charmaine Reid	11	11

Final
(Canada) Anna Rice	8	10
(Canada) Charmaine Reid	11	12

=== Men's doubles ===
Semi-finals
(United States) Khan Malaythong (United States) Raju Rai	15	15
(Canada) Jean Philippe Goyette (Canada) Philippe Bourret	5	7
(Peru) Andrés Corpancho (Peru) Javier Jimeno	2	5
(Canada) Mike Beres (Canada) William Milroy	15	15

Final
(United States) Khan Malaythong (United States) Raju Rai	11	15	15
(Canada) Mike Beres (Canada) William Milroy	15	8	6

=== Women's doubles ===
Semi-finals
(Canada) Helen Nichol (Canada) Charmaine Reid	15	15
(Peru) Claudia Rivero (Peru) Christina Aicardi	5	4
(Canada) Amélie Felx (Canada) Florence Lavoie	11	15	15
(Canada) Milaine Cloutier (Canada) Denyse Julien	15	7	2

Final
(Canada) Helen Nichol (Canada) Charmaine Reid	w	/	o
(Canada) Milaine Cloutier (Canada) Denyse Julien

=== Mixed doubles ===
Semi-finals
(Canada) Mike Beres (Canada) Jody Patrick	15	15
(United States) Marc Lai (United States) Melinda Keszthelyi	7	4
(Canada) William Milroy (Canada) Tammy Sun	15	4	8
(Canada) Philippe Bourret (Canada) Helen Nichol	12	15	15

Final
(Canada) Mike Beres (Canada) Jody Patrick	16	15	15
(Canada) Philippe Bourret (Canada) Helen Nichol	17	8	9

== Team event ==
=== Group stage ===
==== Group A ====
Team	Pld	W	L	MF	MA	MD	Pts
Canada	2	2	0	10	0	+10	2
Peru	2	1	1	5	5	0	1
Trinidad and Tobago	2	0	2	0	10	−10	0

Canada	5–0	Peru
Canada	5–0	Trinidad and Tobago
Peru	5–0	Trinidad and Tobago

==== Group A ====
Team	Pld	W	L	MF	MA	MD	Pts
United States	2	2	0	10	0	+10	2
Guatemala	2	1	1	5	5	0	1
Barbados	2	0	2	0	10	−10	0

United States	5–0	Guatemala
United States	5–0	Barbados
Guatemala	5–0	Barbados

=== Knockout stage ===
Semi-finals
Canada	5
Guatemala	0
Peru	1
United States	4

Final
Canada	3
United States	2
Third place
Guatemala	2
Peru	3
