= Joanne Muggeridge =

British badminton player (born 1969)

Personal information
- Nationality: British (English/Welsh)
- Born: 3 April 1969 (age 57) London, England
- Height: 157 cm (5 ft 2 in)
- Weight: 59 kg (130 lb)

Sport
- Sport: Badminton
- Handedness: Right
Medal record
Women's badminton
Representing England
Commonwealth Games
Gold medal – first place	1994 Victoria	Women's doubles
Gold medal – first place	1994 Victoria	Mixed team
European Junior Championships
Silver medal – second place	1987 Warsaw	Girls' singles
Silver medal – second place	1987 Warsaw	Mixed team

Joanne Muggeridge (born 3 April 1969) is a female badminton player, born in London who represented Great Britain, England and Wales.

== Badminton career ==
She competed in women's singles at the 1992 Summer Olympics in Barcelona, and in women's singles, women's doubles and mixed doubles at the 1996 Summer Olympics in Atlanta. She represented England and won two gold medals in the women's doubles and mixed team events, at the 1994 Commonwealth Games in Victoria, British Columbia, Canada.

Following an argument in 1997 with the England team manager Steve Baddeley she switched allegiance to Wales. She represented the Welsh team at the 2002 Commonwealth Games in Manchester, England, where she competed in the badminton doubles events. She teamed up with Neil Cottrill in the mixed doubles and Felicity Gallup in the women's doubles. Muggeridge continued to represent Wales after the 2002 Commonwealth Games.

Muggeridge was the 13-times champion of Wales at the Welsh National Badminton Championships, winning the women's doubles from 2000 to 2004 and 2006 to 2007 and the mixed doubles from 2001 to 2005 and 2007.

== Achievements ==
=== Commonwealth Games ===
Women's doubles
Year	Venue	Partner	Opponent	Score	Result
1994	McKinnon Gym; Victoria, British Columbia, Canada	(England) Joanne Goode	(England) Julie Bradbury (England) Gillian Clark	15–9, 15–11	Gold

=== European Junior Championships ===
Women's singles
Year	Venue	Opponent	Score	Result
1987	Hali Mery; Warsaw, Poland	(Denmark) Helle Andersen	11–8, 6–11, 6–11	Silver

=== IBF World Grand Prix ===
The World Badminton Grand Prix has been sanctioned by the International Badminton Federation (IBF) from 1983 to 2006.

Women's singles
Year	Tournament	Opponent	Score	Result
1998	U.S. Open	(United States) Yeping Tang	11–7, 4–11, 3–11	(silver) Runner-up

Women's doubles
Year	Tournament	Partner	Opponent	Score	Result
1991	Scottish Open	(Denmark) Lisbet Stuer-Lauridsen	(Sweden) Lim Xiaoqing (Sweden) Christine Magnusson	0–15, 5–15	(silver) Runner-up
1992	Canada Open	(Canada) Denyse Julien	(Denmark) Pernille Dupont (Denmark) Lotte Olsen	7–15, 7–15	(silver) Runner-up
1994	Brunei Open	(England) Karen Chapman	(China) Peng Xinyong (China) Zhang Jin	11–15, 16–12, 5–15	(silver) Runner-up
1996	Polish Open	(Wales) Kelly Morgan	(Sweden) Christine Gandrup (Sweden) Marina Andrievskaya	10–15, 8–15	(silver) Runner-up
2002	Puerto Rico Open	(Wales) Felicity Gallup	(Canada) Helen Nichol (Canada) Charmaine Reid	11–3, 11–3	(gold) Winner

=== IBF International ===
Women's singles
Year	Tournament	Opponent	Score	Result
1989	Welsh International	(Soviet Union) Elena Rybkina	11–12, 11–5, 12–10	(gold) Winner
1990	Amor International	(Soviet Union) Irina Serova	11–7, 11–3	(gold) Winner
1991	Amor International	(Netherlands) Astrid van der Knaap	6–11, 6–11	(silver) Runner-up
1991	Norwegian International	(Denmark) Helle Andersen	7–11, 11–2, 6–11	(silver) Runner-up
1991	Welsh International	(England) Fiona Smith	11–4, 10–12, 11–12	(silver) Runner-up
1992	Austrian International	(Russia) Elena Rybkina	11–5, 12–9	(gold) Winner
1993	Irish Open	(Sweden) Karolina Ericsson	12–11, 11–0	(gold) Winner
1996	Finnish International	(Wales) Kelly Morgan	12–10, 11–5	(gold) Winner
1997	US OCBC International	(United States) Cindy Shi	2–11, 11–5, 4–11	(silver) Runner-up
1997	Slovenia International	(Slovenia) Maja Pohar	11–1, 11–2	(gold) Winner
1998	Brazil International	(Peru) Ximena Bellido	11–1, 11–0	(gold) Winner
1998	Argentina International	(Peru) Lorena Blanco	11–4, 11–6	(gold) Winner
1998	Slovenia International	(Slovenia) Maja Pohar	11–7, 11–6	(gold) Winner
1998	Le Volant d'Or de Toulouse	(Ukraine) Elena Nozdran	9–11, 2–11	(silver) Runner-up
1999	Chile International	(Peru) Adrienn Kocsis	11–7, 11–2	(gold) Winner

Women's doubles
Year	Tournament	Partner	Opponent	Score	Result
1990	Amor International	(Netherlands) Maaike de Boer	(East Germany) Monika Cassens (East Germany) Petra Michalowsky	15–5, 10–15, 15–8	(gold) Winner
1993	Welsh International	(England) Joanne Davies	(England) Julie Bradbury (England) Joanne Goode	9–15, 4–15	(silver) Runner-up
1995	Wimbledon International	(England) Nichola Beck	(Netherlands) Eline Coene (Netherlands) Erica van den Heuvel	15–8, 12–15, 12–15	(silver) Runner-up
1996	Finnish International	(Wales) Kelly Morgan	(England) Nichola Beck (England) Joanne Davies	15–3, 15–10	(gold) Winner
1997	US OCBC International	(England) Felicity Gallup	(United States) Cindy Shi (United States) Yeping Tang	15–11, 15–7	(gold) Winner
1997	Slovak International	(England) Felicity Gallup	(Denmark) Nadia Lyduch (Denmark) Sarah Jonsson	15–2, 15–4	(gold) Winner
1997	Slovenian International	(England) Felicity Gallup	(Scotland) Elinor Middlemiss (Scotland) Sandra Watt	15–10, 7–15, 15–18	(silver) Runner-up
1998	Slovenian International	(England) Felicity Gallup	(Slovenia) Maja Pohar (Slovenia) Maja Tvrdy	15–9, 15–7	(gold) Winner
1998	Welsh International	(England) Felicity Gallup	(Sweden) Marina Andrievskaya (Sweden) Catrine Bengtsson	8–15, 3–15	(silver) Runner-up
2000	Croatian International	(Wales) Felicity Gallup	(Bulgaria) Neli Boteva (Bulgaria) Diana Koleva	15–6, 12–15, 15–5	(gold) Winner
2000	Irish International	(Wales) Felicity Gallup	(England) Emma Constable (England) Sara Hardaker	3–15, 15–12, 16–17	(silver) Runner-up
2001	Chile International	(Wales) Felicity Gallup	(Peru) Sandra Jimeno (Peru) Doriana Rivera	7–5, 7–5, 7–2	(gold) Winner
2001	Peru International	(Wales) Felicity Gallup	(Peru) Sandra Jimeno (Peru) Doriana Rivera	7–2, 7–2, 7–1	(gold) Winner
2001	Puerto Rico International	(Wales) Felicity Gallup	(Italy) Agnese Allegrini (Italy) Federica Panini	15–12, 15–7	(gold) Winner
2002	Mexico International	(Wales) Felicity Gallup	(Peru) Sandra Jimeno (Peru) Doriana Rivera	11–2, 11–8	(gold) Winner
2002	Peru International	(Wales) Felicity Gallup	(Germany) Corina Herrle (Germany) Caren Hückstædt	7–2, 7–3, 7–5	(gold) Winner
2002	Mauritius International	(Wales) Felicity Gallup	(Mauritius) Shama Aboobakar (Mauritius) Martine de Souza	11–4, 11–0	(gold) Winner
2003	Nigeria International	(Wales) Felicity Gallup	(Canada) Denyse Julien (Canada) Anna Rice	15–12, 15–6	(gold) Winner
2003	Brazil International	(Wales) Felicity Gallup	(Canada) Helen Nichol (Canada) Charmaine Reid	11–15, 13–15	(silver) Runner-up
2003	USA International	(Wales) Felicity Gallup	(Japan) Yoshiko Iwata (Japan) Miyuki Tai	2–15, 4–15	(silver) Runner-up
2003	Guatemala International	(Wales) Felicity Gallup	(Japan) Yoshiko Iwata (Japan) Miyuki Tai	12–15, 1–15	(silver) Runner-up

Mixed doubles
Year	Tournament	Partner	Opponent	Score	Result
1994	Wimbledon International	(England) John Quinn	(Russia) Nikolai Zuyev (Russia) Marina Yakusheva	15–7, 15–9	(gold) Winner
2001	Puerto Rico International	(Germany) Conrad Hückstädt	(Netherlands) Tjitte Weistra (Peru) Lorena Blanco	4–15, 11–15	(silver) Runner-up
2002	Mauritius International	(Wales) Matthew Hughes	(Mauritius) Stephan Beeharry (Mauritius) Shama Aboobakar	11–5, 11–3	(gold) Winner
2002	Mexico International	(Wales) Matthew Hughes	(Netherlands) Tjitte Weistra (Peru) Doriana Rivera	11–6, 11–13, 8–11	(silver) Runner-up
2002	Welsh International	(Wales) Matthew Hughes	(Russia) Nikolai Zuyev (Russia) Marina Yakusheva	4–11, 6–11	(silver) Runner-up
2003	Peru International	(Wales) Matthew Hughes	(Spain) José Antonio Crespo (Spain) Dolores Marco	15–2, 15–13	(gold) Winner
2003	Nigeria International	(Wales) Matthew Hughes	(Canada) Philippe Bourret (Canada) Denyse Julien	15–10, 15–11	(gold) Winner
2003	Brazil International	(Wales) Matthew Hughes	(Spain) José Antonio Crespo (Spain) Dolores Marco	15–12, 13–15, 13–15	(silver) Runner-up
