= Khan Malaythong =

American badminton player (born 1981)

Khan Bob Malaythong
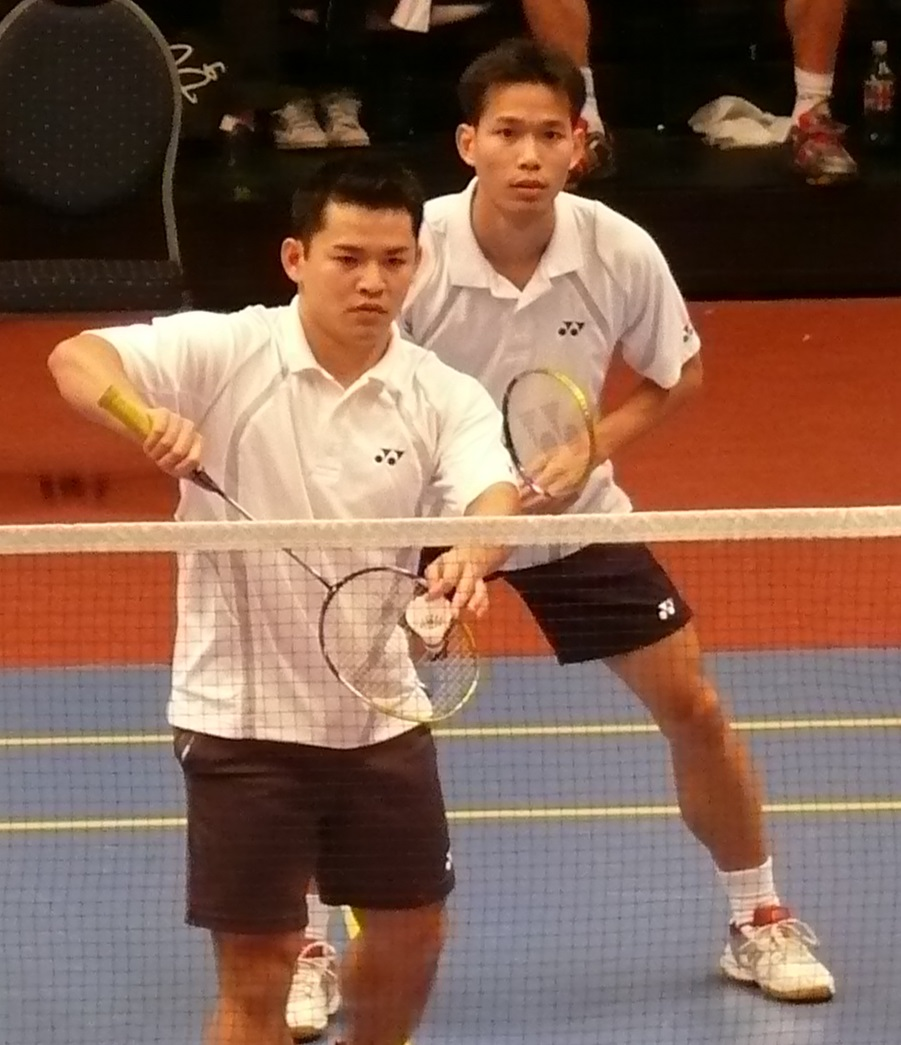
- Howard Bach and Bob Malaythong (USA)

Personal information
- Born: 10 April 1981 (age 45) Vientiane, Laos
- Height: 1.78 m (5 ft 10 in)

Sport
- Country: United States
- Sport: Badminton
- Handedness: Right
- Event: Men's doubles

Men's doubles
- BWF profile
Medal record
Men's badminton
Representing United States
Pan American Games
Silver medal – second place	2007 Rio de Janeiro	Men's doubles
Bronze medal – third place	2007 Rio de Janeiro	Mixed doubles
Pan Am Championships
Gold medal – first place	2005 Bridgetown	Men's doubles
Silver medal – second place	2007 Calgary	Men's doubles
Silver medal – second place	2007 Calgary	Mixed team
Silver medal – second place	2005 Bridgetown	Mixed team
Silver medal – second place	2001 Lima	Mixed doubles
Bronze medal – third place	2007 Calgary	Mixed doubles

Khan "Bob" Malaythong (born 10 April 1981 in Vientiane, Laos) is an American badminton player. He qualified for the U.S. badminton team as a doubles competitor at the 2008 Summer Olympics.

Malaythong moved to the United States at age 8. Malaythong teamed with Howard Bach in the men's doubles. Malaythong graduated from William Jefferson Palmer High School in Colorado Springs, Colorado and Santa Ana College.

Malaythong portrayed a Chinese badminton player in a Vitamin Water commercial starring David Ortiz and Brian Urlacher.

Bob Malaythong won the U.S. National Badminton Championships six times in the men's doubles event, in partnership with Tony Gunawan in 2003 and with Howard Bach in 2005, 2006, 2007, 2008 & 2009. He also won one mixed doubles National title with Mesinee Mangkalakiri in 2005. Malaythong now currently coaches at the Synergy Badminton Academy in Menlo Park, CA, along with fellow Olympian and long-time friend, Raju Rai.

== Achievements ==
=== Pan American Games ===
Men's doubles
Year	Venue	Partner	Opponent	Score	Result
2007	Riocentro Sports Complex Pavilion 4B; Rio de Janeiro, Brazil	(United States) Howard Bach	(Canada) Mike Beres (Canada) William Milroy	20–22, 13–21	Silver

Mixed doubles
Year	Venue	Partner	Opponent	Score	Result
2007	Riocentro Sports Complex Pavilion 4B; Rio de Janeiro, Brazil	(United States) Mesinee Mangkalakiri	(Canada) Mike Beres (Canada) Valerie Loker	20–22, 21–19, 18–21	Bronze

=== Pan Am Championships ===
Men's doubles
Year	Venue	Partner	Opponent	Score	Result
2007	Calgary Winter Club; Calgary, Canada	(United States) Howard Bach	(Canada) Mike Beres (Canada) William Milroy	13–21, 19–21	Silver
2005	Bridgetown, Barbados	(United States) Raju Rai	(Canada) Mike Beres (Canada) William Milroy	11–15, 15–8, 15–6	Gold

Mixed doubles
Year	Venue	Partner	Opponent	Score	Result
2007	Calgary Winter Club; Calgary, Canada	(United States) Mesinee Mangkalakiri	(Canada) Mike Beres (Canada) Valerie Loker	11–21, 20–22	Bronze
2001	Lima, Peru	(United States) Elie Wu	(Canada) Keith Chan (Canada) Milaine Cloutier	2–7, 7–2, 3–7	Silver

=== BWF Grand Prix ===
The BWF Grand Prix has two level such as Grand Prix and Grand Prix Gold. It is a series of badminton tournaments, sanctioned by Badminton World Federation (BWF) since 2007. The World Badminton Grand Prix sanctioned by International Badminton Federation (IBF) since 1983.

Men's doubles
Year	Tournament	Partner	Opponent	Score	Result
2008	U.S. Open	(United States) Howard Bach	(United States) Halim Haryanto (United States) Raju Rai	21–14, 21–19	(gold) Winner
2007	U.S. Open	(United States) Howard Bach	(Japan) Tadashi Ohtsuka (Japan) Keita Masuda	18–21, 11–21	(silver) Runner-up
2003	U.S. Open	(United States) Tony Gunawan	(Chinese Taipei) Lee Sung-yuan (Chinese Taipei) Lin Wei-hsiang	6–15, 15–4, 15–5	(gold) Winner
2002	U.S. Open	(Indonesia) Tony Gunawan	(United States) Howard Bach (United States) Kevin Han	11–15, 15–7, 15–7	(gold) Winner
2002	Puerto Rico Open	(Indonesia) Tony Gunawan	(Spain) José Antonio Crespo (Spain) Sergio Llopis	15–6, 15–3	(gold) Winner

BWF Grand Prix Gold tournament
BWF & IBF Grand Prix tournament

=== BWF International Challenge/Series ===
Men's singles
Year	Tournament	Opponent	Score	Result
2002	Southern Pan Am Classic	(Netherlands) Tjitte Weistra	11–15, 15–5, 8–15	(silver) Runner-up

Men's doubles
Year	Tournament	Partner	Opponent	Score	Result
2008	Canadian International	(United States) Howard Bach	(Japan) Keishi Kawaguchi (Japan) Naoki Kawamae	15–21, 15–21	(silver) Runner-up
2007	Irish International	(United States) Howard Bach	(Germany) Michael Fuchs (Germany) Roman Spitko	21–15, 21–17	(gold) Winner
2007	Norwegian International	(United States) Howard Bach	(Denmark) Mikkel Delbo Larsen (Denmark) Jacob Chemnitz	21–15, 21–11	(gold) Winner
2007	Miami Pan Am International	(United States) Howard Bach	(Canada) Mike Beres (Canada) William Milroy	18–21, 19–21	(silver) Runner-up
2006	Canadian International	(United States) Howard Bach	(Canada) Mike Beres (Canada) William Milroy	16–21, 21–19, 12–21	(silver) Runner-up
2005	SCBA International	(United States) Raju Rai	(United States) Howard Bach (United States) Tony Gunawan	0–1 Retired	(silver) Runner-up
2004	Carebaco International	(United States) Raju Rai	(Canada) Alexandre Tremblay (Canada) Tom Lucas Picher	15–5, 15–7	(gold) Winner
2004	New Zealand International	(United States) Raju Rai	(Japan) Shuichi Nakao (Japan) Shuichi Sakamoto	3–15, 15–10, 12–15	(silver) Runner-up
2002	Southern Pan Am Classic	(Indonesia) Tony Gunawan	(Canada) Philippe Bourret (Canada) Alexandre Tremblay	15–4, 15–4	(gold) Winner

Mixed doubles
Year	Tournament	Partner	Opponent	Score	Result
2005	U.S. International	(United States) Mesinee Mangkalakiri	(United States) Howard Bach (United States) Eva Lee	15–13, 15–12	(gold) Winner
2001	Southern Pan Am Classic	(United States) Mesinee Mangkalakiri	(Trinidad and Tobago) Bradley Graham (Jamaica) Nigella Saunders	7–8, 7–5, 6–8	(gold) Winner

BWF International Challenge tournament
BWF International Series tournament
BWF Future Series tournament
