= Denyse Julien =

Canadian badminton player

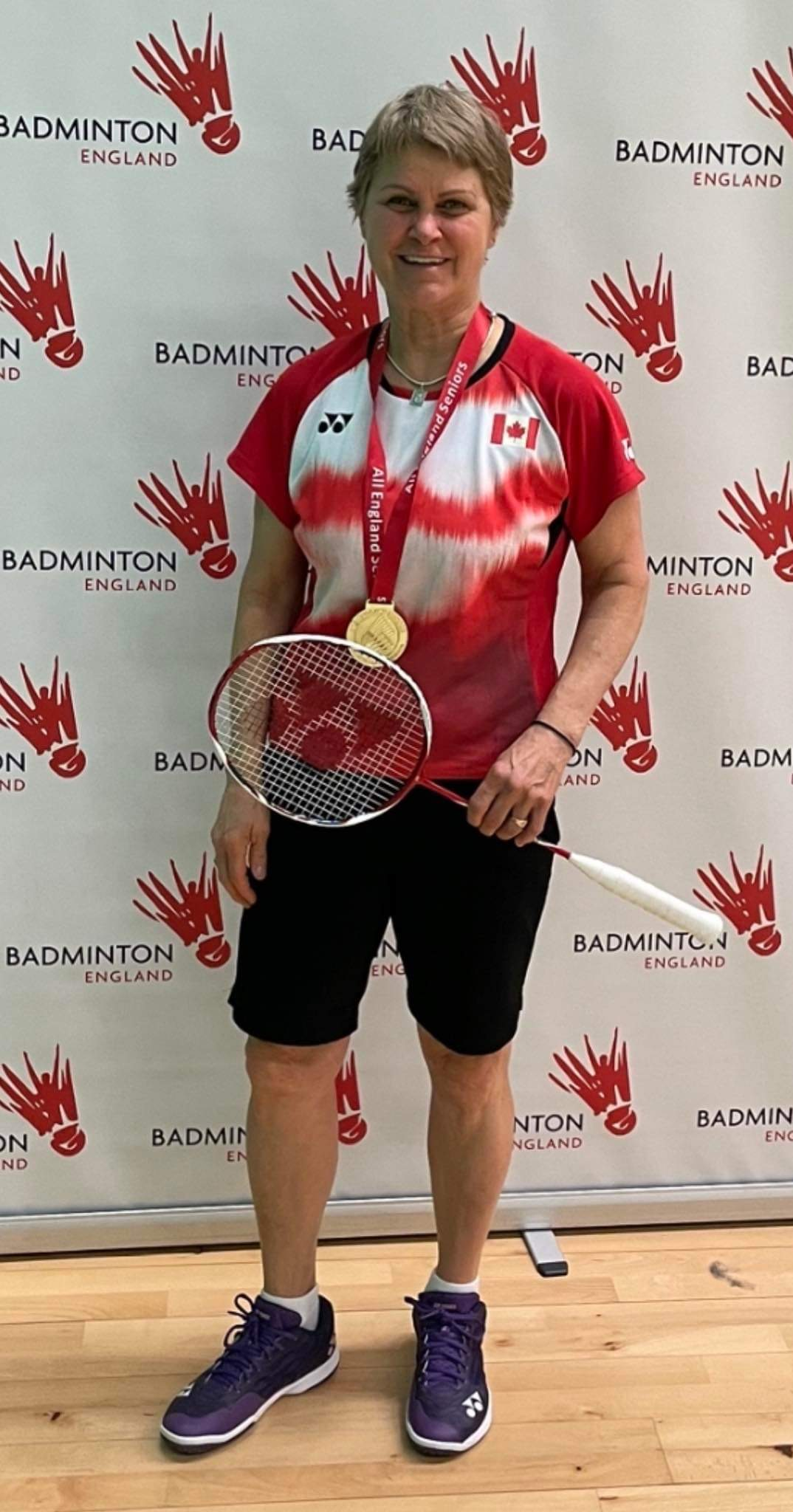

Personal information
- Born: 22 July 1960 (age 66) Rouyn-Noranda, Quebec, Canada

Sport
- Country: Canada
- Sport: Badminton
- BWF profile
Medal record
Women's badminton
Representing Canada
Commonwealth Games
Silver medal – second place	1982 Brisbane	Mixed team
Silver medal – second place	1986 Edinburgh	Women's doubles
Silver medal – second place	1986 Edinburgh	Mixed team
Silver medal – second place	1990 Auckland	Women's singles
Silver medal – second place	1990 Auckland	Mixed team
Bronze medal – third place	1990 Auckland	Women's doubles
Bronze medal – third place	1994 Victoria	Women's doubles
Pan American Games
Gold medal – first place	1995 Mar del Plata	Women's singles
Gold medal – first place	1995 Mar del Plata	Women's doubles
Gold medal – first place	1995 Mar del Plata	Mixed doubles
Gold medal – first place	1999 Winnipeg	Mixed doubles
Gold medal – first place	2003 Santo Domingo	Mixed doubles
Silver medal – second place	1999 Winnipeg	Women's doubles
Silver medal – second place	2003 Santo Domingo	Women's doubles
Bronze medal – third place	1999 Winnipeg	Women's singles
Pan American Championships
Gold medal – first place	1991 Kingston	Women's singles
Gold medal – first place	1997 Winnipeg	Women's singles
Gold medal – first place	1991 Kingston	Women's doubles
Gold medal – first place	1991 Kingston	Mixed doubles
Gold medal – first place	1997 Winnipeg	Mixed doubles
Gold medal – first place	2005 Bridgetown	Mixed team
Silver medal – second place	2005 Bridgetown	Women's doubles
Bronze medal – third place	2005 Bridgetown	Women's singles

Denyse Julien (born 22 July 1960, in Rouyn-Noranda, Quebec) is a Canadian former badminton player.

== Career ==
Between 1981 and 2004 Julien won a record 31 Canadian National Championship events, thirteen in singles, eight in women's doubles, and ten in mixed doubles. She also captured five events at the Canadian Open Championships, including women's singles in 1989. Julien earned four individual medals at the quadrennial Commonwealth Games. These include a silver medal in singles (1990), and a silver (1986) and two bronzes (1990, 1994) in women's doubles. A few months shy of her 35th birthday she won all three events at Mar del Plata, Argentina in 1995 when badminton was introduced into these Games. She won medals in each event at the next competition in Winnipeg in 1999, and a silver in women's doubles and a gold in mixed doubles at the 2003 competition in Santo Domingo, Dominican Republic.

Julien won a number of titles in Europe, including women's singles at French (1982) and Welsh (1991, 1995) Opens, women's doubles at the Austrian International (1983), and mixed doubles at the Portugal Open (1998). She competed in three Olympic Games (1992, 1996, 2004), the highlight of which was winning two rounds of singles at the 1992 Games in Barcelona before bowing to China's reigning world champion Tang Jiuhong.

== Achievements ==
=== Commonwealth Games ===
Women's doubles
Year	Venue	Opponent	Score	Result
1990	Auckland Badminton Hall; Auckland, New Zealand	(England) Fiona Smith	7–11, 9–12	Silver

Women's doubles
Year	Venue	Partner	Opponent	Score	Result
1986	Meadowbank Sports Centre; Edinburgh, Scotland	(Canada) Johanne Falardeau	(England) Gillian Clark (England) Gillian Gowers	6–15, 7–15	Silver
1990	Auckland Badminton Hall; Auckland, New Zealand	(Canada) Johanne Falardeau	(Malaysia) Tan Sui Hoon (Malaysia) Lim Siew Choon	18–13, 15–2	Bronze
1994	McKinnon Gym, University of Victoria; Victoria, Canada	(Canada) Si-An Deng	(England) Joanne Muggeridge (England) Joanne Wright	14–18, 0–15	Bronze

=== Pan American Games ===
Women's singles
Year	Venue	Opponent	Score	Result
1995	CeNARD, Mar del Plata, Argentina	(Canada) Si-An Deng	11–7, 11–1	Gold
1999	Winnipeg Convention Centre, Winnipeg, Canada	(United States) Yeping Tang	11–13, 8–11	Bronze

Women's doubles
Year	Venue	Partner	Opponent	Score	Result
1995	CeNARD, Mar del Plata, Argentina	(Canada) Si-An Deng	(Canada) Milaine Cloutier (Canada) Robbyn Hermitage	15–11, 15–9	Gold
1999	Winnipeg Convention Centre, Winnipeg, Canada	(Canada) Charmaine Reid	(Canada) Milaine Cloutier (Canada) Robbyn Hermitage	15–3, 2–15, 10–15	Silver
2003	UASD Pavilion, Santo Domingo, Dominican Republic	(Canada) Anna Rice	(Canada) Helen Nichol (Canada) Charmaine Reid	13–15, 10–15	Silver

Mixed doubles
Year	Venue	Partner	Opponent	Score	Result
1995	CeNARD, Mar del Plata, Argentina	(Canada) Darryl Yung	(Canada) Anil Kaul (Canada) Si-An Deng	15–4, 15–5	Gold
1999	Winnipeg Convention Centre, Winnipeg, Canada	(Canada) Iain Sydie	(Canada) Brent Olynyk (Canada) Robbyn Hermitage	15–9, 15–6	Gold
2003	UASD Pavilion, Santo Domingo, Dominican Republic	(Canada) Philippe Bourret	(Canada) Mike Beres (Canada) Jody Patrick	7–15, 15–13, 15–12	Gold

=== Pan Am Championships ===
Women's singles
Year	Venue	Opponent	Score	Result
1991	Kingston, Jamaica	(Canada) Doris Piché	3–11, 11–2, 11–6	Gold
1997	Winnipeg, Canada	(Peru) Lorena Blanco	11–1, 11–0	Gold
2005	Bridgetown, Barbados	(Canada) Charmaine Reid	8–11, 4–11	Bronze

Women's doubles
Year	Venue	Partner	Opponent	Score	Result
1991	Kingston, Jamaica	(Canada) Doris Piché	(United States) Linda French (United States) Joy Kitzmiller	15–7, 15–4	Gold
2005	Bridgetown, Barbados	(Canada) Milaine Cloutier	(Canada) Helen Nichol (Canada) Charmaine Reid	walkover	Silver

Mixed doubles
Year	Venue	Partner	Opponent	Score	Result
1991	Kingston, Jamaica	(Canada) Jaimie Dawson	(Jamaica) Robert Richards (Jamaica) Maria Leyow	13–15, 18–14, 15–4	Gold
1997	Winnipeg, Canada	(Canada) Iain Sydie	(Canada) Mike Beres (Canada) Kara Solmundson	17–14, 15–8	Gold

=== IBF World Grand Prix ===
The World Badminton Grand Prix was sanctioned by the International Badminton Federation from 1983 to 2006.

Women's singles
Year	Tournament	Opponent	Score	Result
1983	Canadian Open	(Denmark) Kirsten Larsen	1–11, 1–11	(silver) Runner-up
1987	Canadian Open	(South Korea) Chun Sung-suk	5–11, 7–11	(silver) Runner-up
1989	Canadian Open	(Canada) Si-an Deng	11–9, 11–1	(gold) Winner
1990	US Open	(Soviet Union) Elena Rybkina	7–11, 11–2, 11–8	(gold) Winner
1992	Canadian Open	(Japan) Hisako Mizui	5–11, 11–7, 10–12	(silver) Runner-up
1993	Scottish Open	(Denmark) Camilla Martin	6–11, 8–11	(silver) Runner-up
2002	Puerto Rico Open	(Canada) Charmaine Reid	11–8, 1–11, 13–10	(gold) Winner

Women's doubles
Year	Tournament	Partner	Opponent	Score	Result
1985	Canadian Open	(Canada) Johanne Falardeau	(Canada) Sandra Skillings (Canada) Claire Backhouse	15–7, 14–17, 18–16	(gold) Winner
1990	US Open	(Canada) Doris Piché	(Soviet Union) Elena Rybkina (Soviet Union) Vlada Chernyavskaya	18–13, 18–15	(gold) Winner
1990	Canadian Open	(Canada) Doris Piché	(Canada) Si-an Deng (Canada) Claire Backhouse	15–10, 15–7	(gold) Winner
1992	Canada Open	(England) Joanne Muggeridge	(Denmark) Pernille Dupont (Denmark) Lotte Olsen	7–15, 7–15	(silver) Runner-up

Mixed doubles
Year	Tournament	Partner	Opponent	Score	Result
1989	Canadian Open	(Canada) Bryan Blanshard	(Canada) Mike Bitten (Canada) Doris Piché	10–15, 6–15	(silver) Runner-up
1990	Canadian Open	(Canada) Bryan Blanshard	(Canada) Mike Butler (Canada) Claire Backhouse	15–4, 11–15, 15–4	(gold) Winner

=== IBF International ===
Women’s singles
Year	Tournament	Opponent	Score	Result
1983	Austrian International	(Chinese Taipei) Sherry Liu	8–11, 11–5, 5–11	(silver) Runner-up
1986	US Open	(Japan) Hisako Mori	12–10, 3–11, 12–9	(gold) Winner
1988	Bells Open	(England) Fiona Smith	11–3, 12–10	(gold) Winner
1989	Bells Open	(England) Fiona Smith	4–11, 11–1, 9–12	(silver) Runner-up
1990	Welsh International	(Canada) Si-an Deng	11–3, 12–9	(gold) Winner
1994	Welsh International	(Scotland) Anne Gibson	11–3, 11–8	(gold) Winner
1998	Suriname International	(Canada) Charmaine Reid	11–9, 11–3	(gold) Winner
2002	MiamiPanAm International	(Canada) Jody Patrick	11–6, 7–11, 0–11	(silver) Runner-up
2006	Canadian International	(United States) Eva Lee	12–21, 12–21	(silver) Runner-up

Women's doubles
Year	Tournament	Partner	Opponent	Score	Result
1983	Austrian International	(Canada) Linda Cloutier	(Australia) Julie McDonald (Australia) Audrey Swaby	15–10, 15–11	(gold) Winner
1986	US Open	(Canada) Johanne Falardeau	(Japan) Yomiko Fushiki (Japan) Mami Nakajima	18–16, 15–5	(gold) Winner
1987	Bells Open	(Canada) Johanne Falardeau	(England) Fiona Elliott (England) Sara Halsall	9–15, 10–15	(silver) Runner-up
1988	Bells Open	(Canada) Claire Backhouse-Sharpe	(England) Karen Beckman (England) Sara Halsall	15–12, 15–10	(gold) Winner
1991	Welsh International	(Canada) Doris Piché	(Scotland) Elinor Middlemis (Scotland) Jennifer Williamson	15–4, 15–12	(gold) Winner
1994	Welsh International	(Canada) Si-an Deng	(England) Julie Bradbury (England) Joanne Goode	3–15, 15–17	(silver) Runner-up
1998	Suriname International	(Canada) Charmaine Reid	(Suriname) Nathalie Haynes (Peru) Adrienn Kocsis	15–5, 15–4	(gold) Winner
1999	Guatemala International	(Canada) Charmaine Reid	(Switzerland) Judith Baumeyer (Switzerland) Santi Wibowo	15–10, 15–13	(gold) Winner
2000	Chile International	(Canada) Charmaine Reid	(Japan) Satomi Igawa (Japan) Hiroko Nagamine	10–15, 0–15	(silver) Runner-up
2000	Peru International	(Canada) Charmaine Reid	(Japan) Satomi Igawa (Japan) Hiroko Nagamine	6–15, 8–15	(silver) Runner-up
2002	Miami PanAm International	(Canada) Florence Lavoie	(Canada) Amélie Felx (Canada) Valerie Loker	13–10, 11–3	(gold) Winner
2003	Nigeria International	(Canada) Anna Rice	(Wales) Felicity Gallup (Wales) Joanne Muggeridge	12–15, 6–15	(silver) Runner-up
2005	Miami PanAm International	(Canada) Milaine Cloutier	(Japan) Noriko Okuma (Japan) Miyuki Tai	walkover	(silver) Runner-up

Mixed doubles
Year	Tournament	Partner	Opponent	Score	Result
1998	Portugal International	(Canada) Iain Sydie	(England) James Anderson (England) Sara Hardaker	15–0, 15–7	(gold) Winner
1999	Canada Open	(Canada) Iain Sydie	(Canada) Brent Olynyk (Canada) Robbyn Hermitage	15–4, 15–3	(gold) Winner
2002	Miami PanAm International	(Canada) Philippe Bourret	(United States) Tony Gunawan (United States) Mesinee Mangkalakiri	3–11, 5–11	(silver) Runner-up
2003	Miami PanAm International	(Canada) Philippe Bourret	(Canada) Mike Beres (Canada) Jody Patrick	walkover	(silver) Runner-up
2004	Peru International	(Canada) Philippe Bourret	(Canada) Mike Beres (Canada) Jody Patrick	15–7, 13–15, 15–11	(gold) Winner
