= Felicity Gallup =

British badminton player

Personal information
- Nationality: British (English/Welsh)
- Born: 26 September 1969 (age 57) Surrey, England

Sport
- Sport: Badminton
- Handedness: Right
- BWF profile
Medal record
Women's badminton
Representing England
European Junior Championships
Silver medal – second place	1987 Warsaw	Mixed team

Felicity Gallup (born 26 September 1969) is a retired British badminton player who represented England and Wales in international tournaments.

== Biography ==
Gallup in her teens gave up the badminton career for making her future in modelling in Japan but came back in badminton after few years.

She represented the Welsh team at the 2002 Commonwealth Games in Manchester, England and reached quarterfinals in women's doubles with Jo Muggeridge. En route to the quarterfinals, they defeated top-seeded pair from England Ella Miles & Sara Sankey. She continued to represent Wales after the 2002 Commonwealth Games.

Gallup was a five-times women's doubles champion of Wales (with Muggeridge) at the Welsh National Badminton Championships from 2000 to 2004.

== Achievements ==
=== IBF International ===
Women's singles
Year	Tournament	Opponent	Score	Result
1991	Swiss Open	(Soviet Union) Elena Rybkina	12–10, 6–11, 5–11	(silver) Runner-up
1991	Bulgarian International	(Soviet Union) Irina Serova	3–11, 0–11	(silver) Runner-up

Women's doubles
Year	Tournament	Partner	Opponent	Score	Result
1990	Irish International	(England) Julie Bradbury	(Germany) Katrin Schmidt (Germany) Kerstin Ubben	No match	(silver) Runner-up
1991	Portugal International	(England) Tracy Dineen	(Soviet Union) Elena Denisova (Soviet Union) Marina Yakusheva	15–7, 9–15, 10–15	(silver) Runner-up
1997	US OCBC International	(England) Joanne Muggeridge	(United States) Cindy Shi (United States) Yeping Tang	15–11, 15–7	(gold) Winner
1997	Slovak International	(England) Joanne Muggeridge	(Denmark) Nadia Lyduch (Denmark) Sarah Jonsson	15–2, 15–4	(gold) Winner
1997	Slovenian International	(England) Joanne Muggeridge	(Scotland) Elinor Middlemiss (Scotland) Sandra Watt	15–10, 7–15, 15–18	(silver) Runner-up
1998	Slovenian International	(England) Joanne Muggeridge	(Slovenia) Maja Pohar (Slovenia) Maja Tvrdy	15–9, 15–7	(gold) Winner
1998	Welsh International	(England) Joanne Muggeridge	(Sweden) Marina Andrievskaya (Sweden) Catrine Bengtsson	8–15, 3–15	(silver) Runner-up
2000	Croatian International	(Wales) Joanne Muggeridge	(Bulgaria) Neli Boteva (Bulgaria) Diana Koleva	15–6, 12–15, 15–5	(gold) Winner
2000	Irish International	(Wales) Joanne Muggeridge	(England) Emma Constable (England) Sara Hardaker	3–15, 15–12, 16–17	(silver) Runner-up
2001	Chile International	(Wales) Joanne Muggeridge	(Peru) Sandra Jimeno (Peru) Doriana Rivera	7–5, 7–5, 7–2	(gold) Winner
2001	Peru International	(Wales) Joanne Muggeridge	(Peru) Sandra Jimeno (Peru) Doriana Rivera	7–2, 7–2, 7–1	(gold) Winner
2001	Puerto Rico International	(Wales) Joanne Muggeridge	(Italy) Agnese Allegrini (Italy) Federica Panini	15–12, 15–7	(gold) Winner
2002	Mexico International	(Wales) Joanne Muggeridge	(Peru) Sandra Jimeno (Peru) Doriana Rivera	11–2, 11–8	(gold) Winner
2002	Peru International	(Wales) Joanne Muggeridge	(Germany) Corina Herrle (Germany) Caren Hückstædt	7–2, 7–3, 7–5	(gold) Winner
2002	Mauritius International	(Wales) Joanne Muggeridge	(Mauritius) Shama Aboobakar (Mauritius) Martine de Souza	11–4, 11–0	(gold) Winner
2002	Puerto Rico International	(Wales) Joanne Muggeridge	(Canada) Helen Nichol (Canada) Charmaine Reid	11–3, 11–3	(gold) Winner
2003	Nigeria International	(Wales) Joanne Muggeridge	(Canada) Denyse Julien (Canada) Anna Rice	15–12, 15–6	(gold) Winner
2003	Brazil International	(Wales) Joanne Muggeridge	(Canada) Helen Nichol (Canada) Charmaine Reid	11–15, 13–15	(silver) Runner-up
2003	USA International	(Wales) Joanne Muggeridge	(Japan) Yoshiko Iwata (Japan) Miyuki Tai	2–15, 4–15	(silver) Runner-up
2003	Guatemala International	(Wales) Joanne Muggeridge	(Japan) Yoshiko Iwata (Japan) Miyuki Tai	12–15, 1–15	(silver) Runner-up
