= Doris Piché =

Canadian badminton player (born 1965)

Personal information
- Born: October 14, 1965 (age 61) La Sarre, Québec, Canada
- Height: 164 cm (5 ft 5 in)
- Weight: 59 kg (130 lb)
- Spouse: Michael Bitten

Sport
- Country: Canada
- Sport: Badminton
- Handedness: Right
- BWF profile
Medal record
Women's badminton
Representing Canada
Pan American Championships
Gold medal – first place	1991 Kingston	Women's doubles
Silver medal – second place	1991 Kingston	Women's singles

Doris Piché (born 14 October 1965) is a Canadian badminton player. She competed in women's singles and women's doubles at the 1992 Summer Olympics in Barcelona, and in women's singles and mixed doubles at the 1996 Summer Olympics in Atlanta.

== Personal life ==
Piché and her husband Michael Bitten have two children, one of whom is hockey player William Bitten.

== Achievements ==
=== Pan American Championships ===
Women's singles
Year	Venue	Opponent	Score	Result
1991	Kingston, Jamaica	(Canada) Denyse Julien	11–3, 2–11, 6–11	Silver

Women's doubles
Year	Venue	Partner	Opponent	Score	Result
1991	Kingston, Jamaica	(Canada) Denyse Julien	(United States) Linda French (United States) Joy Kitzmiller	15–7, 15–4	Gold

=== IBF World Grand Prix ===
The World Badminton Grand Prix was sanctioned by the International Badminton Federation from 1983 to 2006.

Women's singles
Year	Tournament	Opponent	Score	Result
1990	Canada Open	(Soviet Union) Vlada Tcherniavskaia	8–11, 11–5, 6–11	(silver) Runner-up
1995	Scottish Open	(Sweden) Catrine Bengtsson	11–8, 4–11, 9–11	(silver) Runner-up

Women's doubles
Year	Tournament	Partner	Opponent	Score	Result
1989	Canada Open	(Canada) Si-an Deng	(South Korea) Chung Eun-hwa (South Korea) Shon Hye-joo	9–15, 15–10, 9–15	(silver) Runner-up
1990	Canada Open	(Canada) Denyse Julien	(Canada) Si-an Deng (Canada) Claire Backhouse-Sharpe	15–10, 15–7	(gold) Winner
1990	U.S. Open	(Canada) Denyse Julien	(Soviet Union) Elena Rybkina (Soviet Union) Vlada Tcherniavskaia	18–13, 18–15	(gold) Winner

Mixed doubles
Year	Tournament	Partner	Opponent	Score	Result
1988	Canada Open	(Canada) Michael Bitten	(Denmark) Henrik Svarrer (Netherlands) Erica van Dijck	13–15, 10–15	(silver) Runner-up
1989	Canada Open	(Canada) Michael Bitten	(Canada) Bryan Blanshard (Canada) Denyse Julien	15–10, 15–6	(gold) Winner

=== IBF International ===
Women's singles
Year	Tournament	Opponent	Score	Result
1989	Mexico International	(Canada) Marie-Helene Loranger	11–5, 5–11, 11–5	(gold) Winner
1991	French Open	(Denmark) Helle Andersen	11–8, 11–7	(gold) Winner
1991	Irish Open	(England) Fiona Smith	12–10, 11–12, 3–11	(silver) Runner-up
1992	French Open	(China) Liu Yuhong	7–11, 12–10, 11–3	(gold) Winner
1995	Irish Open	(England) Tanya Woodward	2–11, 11–7, 11–4	(gold) Winner
1995	Spanish International	(Italy) Yu Yu Wang	3–11, 11–5, 11–7	(gold) Winner

Women's doubles
Year	Tournament	Partner	Opponent	Score	Result
1989	Mexico International	(Canada) Chantal Jobin	(Canada) Marie-Helene Loranger (Canada) Heather Poole	15–4, 15–8	(gold) Winner
1991	Welsh International	(Canada) Denyse Julien	(Scotland) Elinor Middlemiss (Scotland) Jennifer Williamson	15–4, 15–12	(gold) Winner

Mixed doubles
Year	Tournament	Partner	Opponent	Score	Result
1989	Mexico International	(Canada) Michael Bitten	(Canada) John Goss (Canada) Chantal Jobin	15–9, 8–15, 15–3	(gold) Winner
