= 1991 Pan Am Badminton Championships =

Tournament details
- Dates: 17–23 June
- Nations: 10
- Venue: Convention Hall
- Location: Kingston, Jamaica

Champions
- Men's singles: (Canada) Jaimie Dawson
- Women's singles: (Canada) Denyse Julien
- Men's doubles: (Canada) Mike Bitten (Canada) Bryan Blanshard
- Women's doubles: (Canada) Denyse Julien (Canada) Doris Piché
- Mixed doubles: (Canada) Mike Bitten (Canada) Doris Piché

The 1991 Pan Am Badminton Championships was the seventh edition of the Pan American Badminton Championships. The tournament was held from 17 to 23 June at the Convention Hall in Kingston, Jamaica. Ten countries competed in the championships. Eight out of the ten competing countries competed in the mixed team event. Peru and the Cayman Islands only sent players to compete in the individual events.

Canada performed a clean sweep, winning gold in all six events. The United States won three silver medals and two bronze medals. Hosts Jamaica won a silver medal and four bronze medals. Debra O'Connor won Trinidad and Tobago's first medal in the Pan American championships when she achieved bronze in the women's doubles event with Maria Leyow.

== Medal summary ==
=== Medalists ===
Event	Gold	Silver	Bronze
Men's singles	(Canada) Jaimie Dawson	(Canada) Bryan Blanshard	(United States) Chris Jogis
Women's singles	(Canada) Denyse Julien	(Canada) Doris Piché	(United States) Joy Kitzmiller
Men's doubles	(Canada) Mike Bitten (Canada) Bryan Blanshard	(United States) Benny Lee (United States) Thomas Reidy	(Jamaica) George Hugh (Jamaica) Paul Leyow
Women's doubles	(Canada) Denyse Julien (Canada) Doris Piché	(United States) Linda French (United States) Joy Kitzmiller	(Jamaica) Maria Leyow (Trinidad and Tobago) Debra O'Connor
Mixed doubles	(Canada) Jaimie Dawson (Canada) Denyse Julien	(Jamaica) Robert Richards (Jamaica) Maria Leyow	(Jamaica) George Hugh (Jamaica) Camille Lue
Mixed team	Canada; Bryan Blanshard; Mike Bitten; Jaimie Dawson; Doris Piché; Denyse Julien	United States; Peter Baum; John Britton; Mike Edstrom; Chris Jogis; Benny Lee; Thomas Reidy; Dean Schoppe; Traci Britton; Ann French; Linda French; Joy Kitzmiller; Meiling Okuno; Erika von Heiland	Jamaica; Kingsley Ford; Noel Foster; Veron Griffiths; George Hugh; Garth King; Tommy Lee; Paul Leyow; Steven Mayne; Karl McHayle; Roy Paul Jr. Robert Richards; Marcus Wickham; Christine Leyow; Maria Leyow; Terry Walker; Camille Lue; Nigella Saunders

=== Medal table ===
* Host nation (Jamaica)

Rank	Nation	Gold	Silver	Bronze	Total
1	Canada	6	2	0	8
2	United States	0	3	2	5
3	Jamaica*	0	1	3.5	4.5
4	Trinidad and Tobago	0	0	0.5	0.5
Totals (4 entries)		6	6	6	18

== Individual results ==
=== Men's singles ===
Semi-finals
(Canada) Jaimie Dawson	15	15
(United States) Thomas Reidy	7	5
(Canada) Bryan Blanshard	15	15
(United States) Chris Jogis	7	1

Final
(Canada) Jaimie Dawson	18	15
(Canada) Bryan Blanshard	15	8
Third place
(United States) Thomas Reidy
(United States) Chris Jogis	w	/	o

=== Women's singles ===
Semi-finals
(Canada) Denyse Julien	11	11
(Mexico) María de la Paz Luna	2	4
(United States) Joy Kitzmiller	4	2
(Canada) Doris Piché	11	11

Final
(Canada) Denyse Julien	3	11	11
(Canada) Doris Piché	11	2	6
Third place
(Mexico) María de la Paz Luna	11	9	8
(United States) Joy Kitzmiller	3	11	11

=== Men's doubles ===
Semi-finals
(Canada) Mike Bitten (Canada) Bryan Blanshard	15	15
(Jamaica) George Hugh (Jamaica) Paul Leyow	1	4
(Jamaica) Tommy Lee (Jamaica) Robert Richards	6	4
(United States) Benny Lee (United States) Thomas Reidy	15	15

Final
(Canada) Mike Bitten (Canada) Bryan Blanshard	15	15
(United States) Benny Lee (United States) Thomas Reidy	12	5
Third place
(Jamaica) George Hugh (Jamaica) Paul Leyow	15	15
(Jamaica) Tommy Lee (Jamaica) Robert Richards	5	6

=== Women's doubles ===
Semi-finals
(Canada) Denyse Julien (Canada) Doris Piché	15	15
(Jamaica) Maria Leyow (Trinidad and Tobago) Debra O'Connor	13	1
(United States) Ann French (United States) Erika von Heiland	10	7
(United States) Linda French (United States) Joy Kitzmiller	15	15

Final
(Canada) Denyse Julien (Canada) Doris Piché	15	15
(United States) Linda French (United States) Joy Kitzmiller	7	4
Third place
(Jamaica) Maria Leyow (Trinidad and Tobago) Debra O'Connor	15	15
(United States) Ann French (United States) Erika von Heiland	5	8

=== Mixed doubles ===
Semi-finals
(Canada) Jaimie Dawson (Canada) Denyse Julien	15	15
(Jamaica) Paul Leyow (Jamaica) Christine Leyow	6	8
(Jamaica) Robert Richards (Jamaica) Maria Leyow	w	/	o
(Jamaica) George Hugh (Jamaica) Camille Lue

Final
(Canada) Jaimie Dawson (Canada) Denyse Julien	13	18	15
(Jamaica) Robert Richards (Jamaica) Maria Leyow	15	14	4
Third place
(Jamaica) Paul Leyow (Jamaica) Christine Leyow	15	12	11
(Jamaica) George Hugh (Jamaica) Camille Lue	9	15	15

== Team event ==
=== Group stage ===
Eight teams were divided into two groups of four, Group A and Group B. In Group A, Canada topped the group with 5–0 victories over Jamaica, Suriname and Trinidad and Tobago. Jamaica placed second in the group, defeating both Suriname and Trinidad and Tobago 5–0. Suriname defeated Trinidad and Tobago 3–2 to finish third in the group.

In Group B, the United States beat Guatemala and Barbados 5–0. The team despite losing a match in the tie against Mexico advanced to the knockout stages after finishing the tie 4–1. Mexico had a major upset when they lost 3–2 to their Guatemalan opponents but managed to win 5–0 to secure their hopes of qualifying for the knockout stage. Guatemala also had a major upset when the team lost 3–2 to Barbados. With Mexico, Guatemala and Barbados all tied with one point in the group, Mexico advanced to the knockout stages by match difference.

==== Group A ====
Team	Pld	W	L	MF	MA	MD	Pts
Canada	3	3	0	15	0	+15	3
Jamaica	3	2	1	10	5	+5	2
Suriname	3	1	2	3	12	−9	1
Trinidad and Tobago	3	0	3	2	13	−11	0

Canada	5–0	Jamaica
Canada	5–0	Suriname
Canada	5–0	Trinidad and Tobago
Jamaica	5–0	Suriname
Jamaica	5–0	Trinidad and Tobago
Suriname	3–2	Trinidad and Tobago

==== Group B ====
Team	Pld	W	L	MF	MA	MD	Pts
United States	3	3	0	14	1	+13	3
Mexico	3	1	2	8	7	+1	1
Guatemala	3	1	2	5	10	−5	1
Barbados	3	1	2	1	14	−13	1

United States	4–1	Mexico
United States	5–0	Guatemala
United States	5–0	Barbados
Mexico	2–3	Guatemala
Mexico	5–0	Barbados
Guatemala	2–3	Barbados

=== Knockout stage ===
In the semi-finals of the mixed team event, both Canada and the United States defeated Mexico and Jamaica respectively with a score of 4–1. The bronze medal match saw Jamaica defeat Mexico 3–2 to claim their first medal in the Pan Am Mixed Team Championships. Canada defeated the United States 5–0 in the final to retain their title as Pan American mixed team champions.

Semi-finals
Canada	4
Mexico	1
Jamaica	1
United States	4

Final
Canada	5
United States	0
Third place
Mexico	2
Jamaica	3
