= Julie Bradbury =

British badminton player

Personal information
- Born: Julie Jane Bradbury; 12 February 1967 (age 59) Oxford, Oxfordshire, England
- Height: 1.75 m (5 ft 9 in)
- Weight: 64 kg (141 lb)

Sport
- Country: England
- Sport: Badminton
- Handedness: Right

Women's & mixed doubles
- Highest ranking: 4 (WD), 1 (XD)
- BWF profile
Medal record
Women's badminton
Representing England
World Cup
Bronze medal – third place	1995 Jakarta	Women's doubles
Commonwealth Games
Gold medal – first place	1994 Victoria	Mixed team
Silver medal – second place	1994 Victoria	Women's doubles
Silver medal – second place	1994 Victoria	Mixed doubles
European Championships
Silver medal – second place	1996 Herning	Mixed doubles
Bronze medal – third place	1996 Herning	Women's doubles
Bronze medal – third place	1994 Den Bosch	Women's doubles
European Mixed Team Championships
Bronze medal – third place	1996 Herning	Mixed team
Bronze medal – third place	1994 Den Bosch	Mixed team
Bronze medal – third place	1992 Glasgow	Mixed team

Julie Jane Bradbury (born 12 February 1967) is a former English badminton player who represented Great Britain at the 1992 and 1996 Olympic Games. She was part of the national mixed team that won the gold medal at the 1994 Commonwealth Games, also captured the silver medals in the mixed and women's doubles events. Along with those sporting achievements she is only the second person to hold all five titles in all three disciplines of badminton (singles, doubles, and mixed) at the English National Championships. She reached a career high as world No. 1 in the mixed doubles and No. 4 in the women's doubles.

== Career ==
=== 1992 Summer Olympics ===
Bradbury competed in badminton at the 1992 Summer Olympics in women's doubles with Gillian Clark. In the first round they beat Erma Sulistianingsih and Rosiana Tendean of Indonesia and in the second round Katrin Schmidt and Kerstin Ubben of Germany. In the quarterfinals they were beaten by the eventual gold medalists, Hwang Hye-young and Chung So-young of Korea, 5–15, 5–15.

=== 1996 Summer Olympics ===
Bradbury competed in badminton at the 1996 Summer Olympics in the mixed and women's doubles events. Teamed-up with Joanne Goode, they had a bye in the first round, but was defeated by Ann Jørgensen and Lotte Olsen of Denmark 4–15, 5–15 in the second round. In the mixed doubles event, she and Simon Archer were eliminated in the early rounds to Indonesian pair Flandy Limpele and Rosalina Riseu.

== Achievements ==
=== World Cup ===
Women's doubles
Year	Venue	Partner	Opponent	Score	Result
1995	Istora Senayan, Jakarta, Indonesia	(England) Joanne Wright	(Indonesia) Finarsih (Indonesia) Lili Tampi	15–11, 4–15, 3–15	Bronze

=== Commonwealth Games ===
Women's doubles
Year	Venue	Partner	Opponent	Score	Result
1994	McKinnon Gym, Victoria, British Columbia, Canada	(England) Gillian Clark	(England) Joanne Muggeridge (England) Joanne Wright	9–15, 11–15	Silver

Mixed doubles
Year	Venue	Partner	Opponent	Score	Result
1994	McKinnon Gym, Victoria, British Columbia, Canada	(England) Simon Archer	(England) Chris Hunt (England) Gillian Clark	11–15, 4–15	Silver

=== European Championships ===
Women's doubles
Year	Venue	Partner	Opponent	Score	Result
1996	Herning Badminton Klub; Herning, Denmark	(England) Joanne Wright	(Denmark) Marlene Thomsen (Denmark) Lisbeth Stuer-Lauridsen	12–15, 15–10, 4–15	Bronze
1994	Maaspoort Sports and Events; Den Bosch, Netherlands	(England) Gillian Clark	(Sweden) Lim Xiaoqing (Sweden) Christine Magnusson	11–15, 15–12, 14–16	Bronze

Mixed doubles
Year	Venue	Partner	Opponent	Score	Result
1996	Herning Badminton Klub; Herning, Denmark	(England) Simon Archer	(Denmark) Michael Søgaard (Denmark) Rikke Olsen	16–18, 2–15	Silver

=== IBF World Grand Prix ===
The World Badminton Grand Prix sanctioned by International Badminton Federation (IBF) since 1983.

Women's doubles
Year	Tournament	Partner	Opponent	Score	Result
1997	Swedish Open	(England) Donna Kellogg	(China) Liu Lu (China) Qian Hong	11–15, 18–17, 11–15	(silver) Runner-up
1996	Denmark Open	(England) Joanne Wright	(Denmark) Helene Kirkegaard (Denmark) Rikke Olsen	6–15, 2–15	(silver) Runner-up
1996	U.S. Open	(England) Joanne Wright	(Indonesia) Eliza Nathanael (Indonesia) Zelin Resiana	7–15, 5–15	(silver) Runner-up
1995	Hong Kong Open	(England) Joanne Wright	(South Korea) Jang Hye-ock (South Korea) Gil Young-ah	15–17, 5–15	(silver) Runner-up
1995	Malaysia Open	(England) Joanne Wright	(South Korea) Jang Hye-ock (South Korea) Gil Young-ah	15–10, 15–11	(gold) Winner
1994	Thailand Open	(England) Joanne Wright	(China) Ge Fei (China) Gu Jun	12–15, 4–15	(silver) Runner-up
1992	Dutch Open	(England) Joanne Wright	(Denmark) Marianne Rasmussen (Denmark) Anne Mette Bille	9–15, 15–9, 2–15	(silver) Runner-up

Mixed doubles
Year	Tournament	Partner	Opponent	Score	Result
1996	All England Open	(England) Simon Archer	(South Korea) Park Joo-bong (South Korea) Ra Kyung-min	10–15, 10–15	(silver) Runner-up
1996	Swiss Open	(England) Simon Archer	(Sweden) Jan-Eric Antonsson (Sweden) Astrid Crabo	7–15, 15–12, 11–15	(silver) Runner-up
1996	Korea Open	(England) Simon Archer	(South Korea) Park Joo-bong (South Korea) Ra Kyung-min	9–15, 11–15	(silver) Runner-up
1995	Grand Prix Finals	(England) Simon Archer	(Indonesia) Tri Kusharyanto (Indonesia) Minarti Timur	8–15, 8–15	(silver) Runner-up
1994	Denmark Open	(England) Simon Archer	(Denmark) Thomas Lund (Denmark) Marlene Thomsen	8–15, 3–15	(silver) Runner-up

=== IBF International ===
Women's singles
Year	Tournament	Opponent	Score	Result
1991	Spanish International	(England) Suzanne Louis-Lane	0–11, 6–11	(silver) Runner-up

Women's doubles
Year	Tournament	Partner	Opponent	Score	Result
1994	Welsh International	(England) Joanne Wright	(Canada) Si-An Deng (Canada) Denyse Julien	15–3, 17–15	(gold) Winner
1993	Welsh International	(England) Joanne Wright	(England) Joanne Davies (England) Joanne Muggeridge	15–9, 15–4	(gold) Winner
1992	Welsh International	(England) Sara Sankey	(Germany) Anne-Katrin Seid (Germany) Nicole Baldewein	15–8, 15–1	(gold) Winner
1991	Spanish International	(England) Gillian Clark	(Republic of Ireland) Ciara Doheny (Germany) Katrin Schmidt	12–15, 15–12, 15–7	(gold) Winner
1991	Wimbledon International	(England) Gillian Clark	(England) Gillian Gowers (England) Sara Sankey	5–15, 15–10, 15–5	(gold) Winner
1990	Irish International	(England) Felicity Gallup	(Germany) Katrin Schmidt (Germany) Kerstin Ubben	No match	(gold) Winner
1990	Welsh International	(England) Cheryl Johnson	(England) Joanne Wright (England) Alison Humby	15–11, 15–8	(gold) Winner
1989	Irish International	(England) Suzanne Louis-Lane	(Scotland) Elinor Middlemiss (Scotland) Jennifer Williamson	7–15, 9–15	(silver) Runner-up
