= Badminton at the 1994 Commonwealth Games =

- Venue: McKinnon Gym, University of Victoria
- Location: Victoria, British Columbia, Canada
- Dates: 20 – 28 August 1994

Badminton at the 1994 Commonwealth Games was the eighth appearance of Badminton at the Commonwealth Games. The competition was held in Victoria, British Columbia, Canada, from 20 August until 28 August 1994. There were no bronze medal play off matches because both losing semi-finalists were awarded a bronze medal.

The badminton events were held in the McKinnon Gym at the University of Victoria.

England topped the badminton medal table by virtue of winning three gold medals.

== Medal summary ==
=== Medal table ===
* Host nation (Canada)

Rank	Nation	Gold	Silver	Bronze	Total
1	England	3	3	2	8
2	Malaysia	2	2	2	6
3	Australia	1	0	4	5
4	Canada*	0	1	1	2
5	New Zealand	0	0	2	2
6	Hong Kong	0	0	1	1
Totals (6 entries)		6	6	12	24

=== Medallists ===
Event	Gold	Silver	Bronze
Men's singles	Rashid Sidek; Malaysia	Ong Ewe Hock; Malaysia	Nick Hall; New Zealand
Men's singles	Rashid Sidek; Malaysia	Ong Ewe Hock; Malaysia	Anders Nielsen; England
Women's singles	Lisa Campbell; Australia	Si-An Deng; Canada	Rhona Robertson; New Zealand
Women's singles	Lisa Campbell; Australia	Si-An Deng; Canada	Song Yang; Australia
Men's doubles	Malaysia; Cheah Soon Kit; Soo Beng Kiang	England; Simon Archer; Chris Hunt	Australia; Peter Blackburn; Mark Nichols
Men's doubles	Malaysia; Cheah Soon Kit; Soo Beng Kiang	England; Simon Archer; Chris Hunt	Malaysia; Ong Ewe Hock; Tan Kim Her
Women's doubles	England; Joanne Muggeridge; Joanne Wright	England; Gillian Clark; Julie Bradbury	Canada; Si-An Deng; Denyse Julien
Women's doubles	England; Joanne Muggeridge; Joanne Wright	England; Gillian Clark; Julie Bradbury	Malaysia; Lee Wai Leng; Tan Lee Wai
Mixed doubles	England; Chris Hunt; Gillian Clark	England; Simon Archer; Julie Bradbury	Australia; Peter Blackburn; Rhonda Cator
Mixed doubles	England; Chris Hunt; Gillian Clark	England; Simon Archer; Julie Bradbury	England; Nick Ponting; Joanne Wright
Mixed team	England; Simon Archer; Julie Bradbury; Gillian Clark; Chris Hunt; Peter Knowles; Suzanne Louis-Lane; Joanne Muggeridge; Anders Nielsen	Malaysia; Cheah Soon Kit; Kuak Seok Choon; Lee Wai Leng; Leong Yeng Cheng; Ong Ewe Hock; Rashid Sidek; Zamaliah Sidek; Soo Beng Kiang; Tan Kim Her; Tan Lee Wai	Australia; Peter Blackburn; Lisa Campbell; Rhonda Cator; Amanda Hardy; Murray Hocking; Stuart Metcalfe; Mark Nichols; Wendy Shinners; Paul Stevenson; Song Yang
Mixed team	England; Simon Archer; Julie Bradbury; Gillian Clark; Chris Hunt; Peter Knowles; Suzanne Louis-Lane; Joanne Muggeridge; Anders Nielsen	Malaysia; Cheah Soon Kit; Kuak Seok Choon; Lee Wai Leng; Leong Yeng Cheng; Ong Ewe Hock; Rashid Sidek; Zamaliah Sidek; Soo Beng Kiang; Tan Kim Her; Tan Lee Wai	Hong Kong; Chan Oi Ni; Chan Siu Kwong; Cheng Yin Sat; Chung Hoi Yuk; Ma Che Kong; Tam Kai Chuen; Tung Chau Man; Wong Chun Fan; Wong Wai Keung; Wong Wai Lap

== Results ==
=== Men's singles ===
Round of 16
(Malaysia) Rashid Sidek	15	15
(Sri Lanka) Duminda Jayakody	8	4
(New Zealand) Dean Galt	15	15
(Jamaica) Paul Leyow	2	10
(England) Anders Nielsen	w/o
(Canada) Iain Sydie	scr
(Hong Kong) Wong Wai Lap	15	15
(South Africa) Nico Meerholz	1	0
(Malaysia) Ong Ewe Hock	15	15
(Jamaica) George Hugh	4	2
(Canada) Jaimie Dawson	15	18
(Scotland) Bruce Flockhart	4	17
(New Zealand) Nick Hall	15	15
(Brunei) Yuin Zailani Bin	7	2
(England) Peter Knowles	15	18
(Jamaica) Robert Richards	6	13

Quarter-finals
(Malaysia) Sidek	15	15
(New Zealand) Galt	3	0
(England) Nielsen	15	11	15
(Hong Kong) Lap	9	15	5
(Malaysia) Hock	15	15
(Canada) Dawson	3	10
(New Zealand) Hall	15	15
(England) Knowles	11	13

Semi-finals
(Malaysia) Sidek	15	15
(England) Nielsen	3	11
(Malaysia) Hock	15	15
(New Zealand) Hall	4	5

Final
(Malaysia) Sidek	15	15
(Malaysia) Hock	6	4

=== Women's singles ===
Round of 16
(Australia) Lisa Campbell	12	11
(Scotland) Anne Gibson	9	7
(England) Suzanne Louis-Lane	11	11
(Malaysia) Cheng Leong Yeng	1	5
(New Zealand) Rhonda Robertson	11	12
(Scotland) Aileen Travers	7	11
(Canada) Denyse Julien	11	11
(Nigeria) Obiageli Olorunsola	5	0
(Canada) Si-An Deng	12	12
(Australia) Rhonda Cator	11	9
(England) Joanne Muggeridge	11	11
(South Africa) Lina Fourie	1	0
(Australia) Song Yang	11	11
(Hong Kong) Wong Chun Fan	4	1
(Singapore) Zarinah Abdullah	12	11
(Trinidad and Tobago) Debra O'Connor	9	2

Quarter-finals
(Australia) Campbell	9	11	11
(England) Louis-Lane	11	8	1
(New Zealand) Robertson	11	11
(Canada) Julien	8	6
(Canada) Deng	11	11
(England) Muggeridge	7	0
(Australia) Song Yang	11	3	11
(Singapore) Abdullah	3	11	7

Semi-finals
(Australia) Campbell	11	12
(New Zealand) Robertson	1	10
(Canada) Deng	8	11	11
(Australia) Song Yang	11	9	5

Final
(Australia) Campbell	11	11
(Canada) Deng	2	5

=== Men's doubles ===
Quarterfinals
(Malaysia) Cheah Soon Kit (Malaysia) Soo Beng Kiang	15	15
(Scotland) Russell Hogg (Scotland) Ken Middlemiss	3	8
(Australia) David Blackburn (Australia) Mark Nichols	15	15
(Hong Kong) Ma Che Kong (Hong Kong) Tam Kai Chuen	1	2
(England) Simon Archer (England) Chris Hunt	15	15
(New Zealand) Dean Galt (New Zealand) Nick Hall	8	4
(Malaysia) Ong Ewe Hock (Malaysia) Tan Kim Her	15	15
(Scotland) Bruce Flockhart (Scotland) Gordon Haldane	1	7

Semifinals
(Malaysia) Kit (Malaysia) Kiang	15	15
(Australia) Blackburn (Australia) Nichols	1	2
(England) Archer (England) Hunt	15	15
(Malaysia) Hock (Malaysia) Tan Kim Her	1	7

Finals
(Malaysia) Kit (Malaysia) Kiang	15	15
(England) Archer (England) Hunt	10	9

=== Women's doubles ===
Quarterfinals
(England) Joanne Muggeridge (England) Joanne Wright	9	15	15
(Hong Kong) Chan Oi Ni (Hong Kong) Cheng Yin Sat	15	8	2
(Canada) Si-An Deng (Canada) Denyse Julien	15	15
(Scotland) Elinor Allen (Scotland) Jenny Allen	8	6
(England) Julie Bradbury (England) Gillian Clark	15	15
(Northern Ireland) Jayne Plunkett (Northern Ireland) Ann Stephens	2	3
(Malaysia) Lee Wai Leng (Malaysia) Tan Lee Wai	15	15
(New Zealand) Tammy Jenkins (New Zealand) Rhona Robertson	9	7

Semifinals
(England) Muggeridge (England) Wright	18	15
(Canada) Si-An Deng (Canada) Julien	14	0
(England) Bradbury (England) Clark	18	14	15
(Malaysia) Leng (Malaysia) Tan Lee	17	17	9

Finals
(England) Muggeridge (England) Wright	15	15
(England) Bradbury (England) Clark	9	11

=== Mixed doubles ===
Quarterfinals
(England) Chris Hunt (England) Gillian Clark	17	15
(Malaysia) Tan Kim Her (Malaysia) Tan Lee Wai	15	9
(Australia) Peter Blackburn (Australia) Rhonda Cator	15	15
(Malaysia) Soo Beng Kiang (Malaysia) Zamaliah Sidek	8	8
(England) Simon Archer (England) Julie Bradbury	15	6	15
(Malaysia) Cheah Soon Kit (Malaysia) Lee Wai Leng	6	15	8
(England) Nick Ponting (England) Joanne Wright	10	15	15
(Hong Kong) Chan Siu Kwong (Hong Kong) Chung Hoi Yuk	15	8	8

Semifinals
(England) Hunt (England) Clark	15	15
(Australia) Blackburn (Australia) Cator	7	4
(England) Archer (England) Bradbury	15	15
(England) Ponting (England) Wright	10	12

Finals
(England) Hunt (England) Clark	15	15
(England) Archer (England) Bradbury	11	4

=== Mixed team ===
Semi-finals

Team One	Team Two	Score
England	Australia	4-1
Malaysia	Hong Kong	3-2

Final

England
3

Malaysia
2

			1	2	3
1	(England) (Malaysia)	Peter Knowles; Rashid Sidek	8; 15	5; 15
2	(England) (Malaysia)	Joanne Muggeridge; Lee Wai Leng	11; 2	11; 8
3	(England) (Malaysia)	Simon Archer / Chris Hunt; Cheah Soon Kit / Soo Beng Kiang	12; 15	4; 15
4	(England) (Malaysia)	Gillian Clark / Julie Bradbury; Lee Wai Leng / Tan Lee Wai	15; 3	15; 3
5	(England) (Malaysia)	Nick Ponting / Joanne Wright; Tan Kim Her / Zamaliah Sidek	4; 4	16; 18	18; 16
