= Keita Masuda =

Japanese badminton player (born 1979)

Personal information
- Born: 27 February 1979 (age 47) Tokyo
- Height: 1.74 m (5 ft 9 in)
- Weight: 76 kg (168 lb)

Sport
- Country: Japan
- Sport: Badminton

Keita Masuda (舛田圭太; born 27 February 1979 in Kanazawa, Ishikawa, Japan) is a male badminton player from Japan.

== Career ==
Masuda competed in badminton at the 2004 Summer Olympics in men's doubles with partner Tadashi Ohtsuka. They had a bye in the first round, then were defeated in the round of 16 by Fu Haifeng and Cai Yun of China.

Matsuda played at the 2007 BWF World Championships in men's doubles with Tadashi Ohtsuka, and were defeated in the third round by the eventual champions Markis Kido and Hendra Setiawan, of Indonesia, 22–20, 21–19. He also played in mixed doubles with Miyuki Maeda and they lost in the second round against He Hanbin and Yu Yang, 21–17, 21–18.

== Achievements ==
=== BWF Grand Prix (2 titles, 1 runner-up) ===
The BWF Grand Prix had two levels, the BWF Grand Prix and Grand Prix Gold. It was a series of badminton tournaments sanctioned by the Badminton World Federation (BWF) which was held from 2007 to 2017. The World Badminton Grand Prix has been sanctioned by International Badminton Federation (IBF) from 1983 to 2006.

Men's doubles
Year	Tournament	Partner	Opponent	Score	Result
2005	Dutch Open	(Japan) Tadashi Ōtsuka	(Malaysia) Choong Tan Fook (Malaysia) Lee Wan Wah	7–15, 4–15	(silver) Runner-up
2007	U.S. Open	(Japan) Tadashi Ōtsuka	(United States) Howard Bach (United States) Khan Malaythong	21–18, 21–11	(gold) Winner

Mixed doubles
Year	Tournament	Partner	Opponent	Score	Result
2007	U.S. Open	(Japan) Miyuki Maeda	(United States) Howard Bach (United States) Eva Lee	19–21, 21–11, 21–19	(gold) Winner

BWF Grand Prix tournament
IBF World Grand Prix tournament

=== IBF International Challenge/Series (5 titles, 4 runners-up) ===
Men's singles
Year	Tournament	Opponent	Score	Result	Ref.
2003	Mauritius International	(Japan) Hidetaka Yamada	15–4, 15–11	(gold) Winner	

Men's doubles
Year	Tournament	Partner	Opponent	Score	Result	Ref.
1999	Mexico International	(Japan) Tadashi Ōtsuka	(Hong Kong) Ma Che Kong (Hong Kong) Yau Tsz Yuk	7–15, 15–13, 10–15	(silver) Runner-up	
2000	Cuba International	(Japan) Tadashi Ōtsuka	(Spain) José Antonio Crespo (Spain) Sergio Llopis	15–9, 15–2	(gold) Winner	
2000	French International	(Japan) Tadashi Ōtsuka	(Japan) Takuya Katayama (Japan) Yuzo Kubota	15–6, 15–11	(gold) Winner	
2003	Waikato International	(Japan) Tadashi Ōtsuka	(Singapore) Hendri Saputra (Singapore) Denny Setiawan	7–15, 15–12, 3–15	(silver) Runner-up	
2003	Guatemala International	(Japan) Tadashi Ōtsuka	(United States) Howard Bach (United States) Kevin Han	15–6, 15–12	(gold) Winner	
2004	Iran Fajr International	(Japan) Tadashi Ōtsuka	(Hong Kong) Liu Kwok Wa (Hong Kong) Albertus Susanto Njoto	4–15, 11–15	(silver) Runner-up	
2004	Mauritius International	(Japan) Tadashi Ōtsuka	(Hong Kong) Liu Kwok Wa (Hong Kong) Albertus Susanto Njoto	15–11, 15–8	(gold) Winner	

BWF International Series tournament
