= Badminton at the 1995 Pan American Games =

- Competitors: 56 from 10 nations

The badminton competition at the 1995 Pan American Games was held from 12 March to 16 March 1995, in CeNARD, Buenos Aires, Argentina. There were five medal events. Badminton made its debut at the Pan American Games at this edition.

== Participating nations ==
A total of 10 nations entered players in the badminton competitions, with a total of 56 athletes.

- Argentina (7)
- Barbados (2)
- Brazil (8)
- Canada (8)
- Guatemala (4)
- Jamaica (6)
- Peru (9)
- Suriname (2)
- Trinidad and Tobago (2)
- United States (8)

== Medal summary ==
=== Medal table ===
* Host nation (Argentina)

Rank	NOC	Gold	Silver	Bronze	Total
1	Canada	5	3	2	10
2	United States	0	2	4	6
3	Jamaica	0	0	2	2
4	Peru	0	0	1	1
4	Trinidad and Tobago	0	0	1	1
Totals (5 entries)		5	5	10	20

=== Medalists ===
Since there were four Canadian players entered in the women's singles tournament, Robbyn Hermitage and Milaine Cloutier, who lost in the semifinals to their compatriots Denyse Julien and Si-An Deng, did not receive the bronze medals, as, under the rules in effect at the time, one country could not occupy all the podium places. Thus, the two bronze medals were awarded to Beverly Tang of Trinidad and Tobago and Kathy Zimmermann of the United States, who were the two highest-place finishers from other countries.

Event	Gold	Silver	Bronze
Men's singles	Jaimie Dawson; Canada	Iain Sydie; Canada	Kevin Han; United States
Men's singles	Jaimie Dawson; Canada	Iain Sydie; Canada	Mario Carulla; Peru
Women's singles	Denyse Julien; Canada	Si-An Deng; Canada	Beverly Tang; Trinidad and Tobago
Women's singles	Denyse Julien; Canada	Si-An Deng; Canada	Kathy Zimmermann; United States
Men's doubles	Canada; Anil Kaul; Iain Sydie	United States; Kevin Han; Thomas Reidy	Jamaica; Paul Leyow; Roy Paul Jr.
Men's doubles	Canada; Anil Kaul; Iain Sydie	United States; Kevin Han; Thomas Reidy	Canada; Jaimie Dawson; Darryl Yung
Women's doubles	Canada; Denyse Julien; Si-An Deng	Canada; Robbyn Hermitage; Milaine Cloutier	United States; Anne French; Kathy Zimmerman
Women's doubles	Canada; Denyse Julien; Si-An Deng	Canada; Robbyn Hermitage; Milaine Cloutier	United States; Linda French; Erika von Heiland
Mixed doubles	Canada; Darryl Yung; Denyse Julien	United States; Anil Kaul; Si-An Deng	Jamaica; Paul Leyow; Terry Leyow
Mixed doubles	Canada; Darryl Yung; Denyse Julien	United States; Anil Kaul; Si-An Deng	Canada; Mike Edstrom; Linda French

== See also ==
- Badminton at the 1996 Summer Olympics
