= Anna Rice =

Canadian badminton player

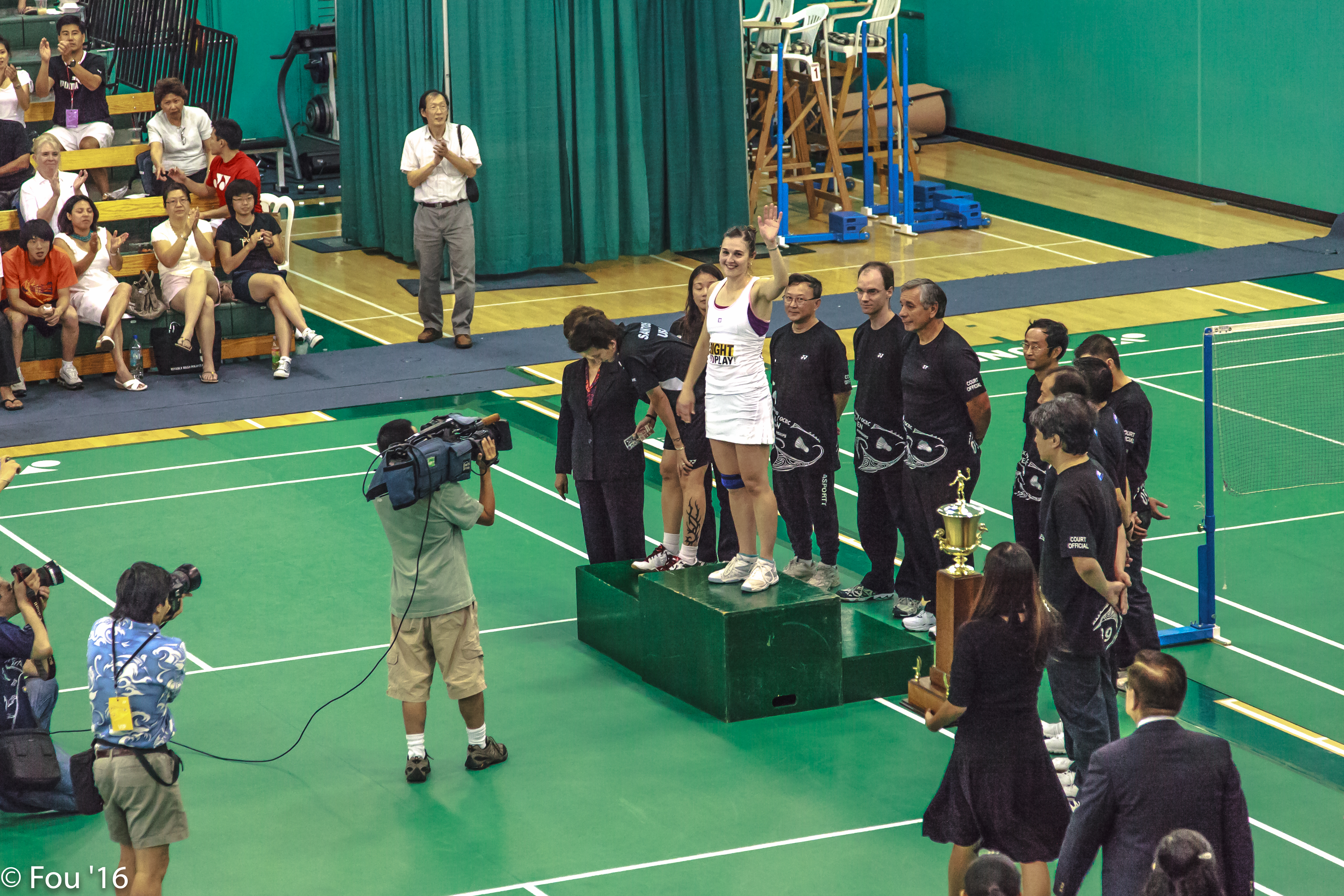

Personal information
- Born: Anna Kathleen Rice; 19 August 1980 (age 46) North Vancouver, British Columbia, Canada
- Height: 1.70 m (5 ft 7 in)
- Weight: 62 kg (137 lb)

Sport
- Country: Canada
- Sport: Badminton
- Handedness: Right
- Event: Women's singles & doubles

Women's singles & doubles
- BWF profile
Medal record
Women's badminton
Representing Canada
Pan American Games
| Silver medal – second place | 2003 Santo Domingo | Women's singles |
| Silver medal – second place | 2003 Santo Domingo | Women's doubles |
Pan Am Championships
| Gold medal – first place | 2005 Bridgetown | Mixed team |
| Gold medal – first place | 2007 Calgary | Women's singles |
| Gold medal – first place | 2007 Calgary | Mixed team |
| Gold medal – first place | 2009 Guadalajara | Women's singles |
| Gold medal – first place | 2009 Guadalajara | Mixed team |
| Silver medal – second place | 2005 Bridgetown | Women's singles |
Pan Am Junior Championships
| Gold medal – first place | 1998 Guadalajara | Girls' singles |
| Gold medal – first place | 1998 Guadalajara | Mixed team |

Anna Kathleen Rice (born 19 August 1980) is a Canadian badminton player. She attended Handsworth Secondary School, and completed a B.A. from the University of British Columbia.

== Career ==
In 1999, Rice represented British Columbia competed at the Canada Winter Games in Corner Brook, clinched the women's singles title and runner-up in the women's doubles. In 2000, Rice moved to Denmark to play in the Danish Club League and to train at the International Badminton Academy under coach Michael Kjeldsen. She was two times Olympian and five times National Champion.

In Athens 2004 Summer Olympics, in women's doubles with partner Denyse Julien. They were defeated by Saralee Thungthongkam and Sathinee Chankrachangwong of Thailand. She also competed in Badminton at the 2008 Summer Olympics and was a round-of-16 finalist, being the first North American player to do so. In Beijing 2008, she competed in the singles event. She reached the third round, beating Eva Lee of the United States and Jeanine Cicognini of Switzerland before she was defeated by Lu Lan in straight games.

She won the Canadian National Championships in 2004, 2005, 2008, 2009, and 2010. She has also won the U.S. Open title in 2009 and Pan American women's singles champion in 2007 and 2009. She also won two silver medals at the 2003 Pan American Games in the women's singles and doubles event. Rice participated in the 2006 and 2010 Commonwealth Games, reaching the quarter-finals in 2010. Her highest world ranking was 18, the highest in Canadian history until Michelle Li achieved a ranking of 11.

Rice is coached by Julia Chen and Michael Kjeldsen. She now focuses her time directing the coaching program and offering badminton lessons.

== Achievements ==
=== Pan American Games ===
Women's singles
| Year | Venue | Opponent | Score | Result |
|---|---|---|---|---|
| 2003 | UASD Pavilion; Santo Domingo, Dominican Republic | (Jamaica) Nigella Saunders | 13–15, 10–15 | Silver |

Women's doubles
| Year | Venue | Partner | Opponent | Score | Result |
|---|---|---|---|---|---|
| 2003 | UASD Pavilion; Santo Domingo, Dominican Republic | (Canada) Denyse Julien | (Canada) Charmaine Reid (Canada) Helen Nichol | 7–11, 11–3, 8–11 | Silver |

=== Pan Am Championships ===
Women's singles
| Year | Venue | Opponent | Score | Result |
|---|---|---|---|---|
| 2005 | Saint Michael; Bridgetown, Barbados | (Canada) Charmaine Reid | 8–11, 10–13 | Silver |
| 2007 | Calgary Winter Club; Calgary, Canada | (Peru) Claudia Rivero | 21–16, 21–11 | Gold |
| 2009 | Coliseo Olímpico de la Universidad; Guadalajara, Mexico | (Canada) Joycelyn Ko | 21–17, 21–14 | Gold |

=== BWF Grand Prix ===
The BWF Grand Prix had two levels, the Grand Prix and Grand Prix Gold. It was a series of badminton tournaments sanctioned by the Badminton World Federation (BWF) and played between 2007 and 2017.

Women's singles
| Year | Tournament | Opponent | Score | Result |
|---|---|---|---|---|
| 2009 | U.S. Open | (United States) Mona Santoso | 21–17, 21–9 | (gold) Winner |

BWF Grand Prix Gold tournament
BWF Grand Prix tournament

=== BWF International Challenge/Series ===
Women's singles
| Year | Tournament | Opponent | Score | Result |
|---|---|---|---|---|
| 2001 | Auckland International | (Indonesia) Lenny Permana | 5–7, 1–7, 0–7 | (silver) Runner-up |
| 2003 | Nigeria International | (Jamaica) Nigella Saunders | 11–3, 11–5 | (gold) Winner |
| 2005 | Peru International | (Scotland) Yuan Wemyss | 11–2, 1–11, 5–11 | (silver) Runner-up |
| 2005 | Miami International | (Scotland) Yuan Wemyss | 3–11, 5–11 | (silver) Runner-up |
| 2006 | Portugal International | (Scotland) Yuan Wemyss | 9–21 Retired | (silver) Runner-up |
| 2007 | Le Volant d'Or de Toulouse | (England) Tracey Hallam | 18–21, 15–21 | (silver) Runner-up |
| 2007 | Bulgarian International | (Bulgaria) Petya Nedelcheva | 19–21, 16–21 | (silver) Runner-up |
| 2009 | Santo Domingo Open | (Slovenia) Maja Tvrdy | 19–21, 23–21, 18–21 | (silver) Runner-up |
| 2009 | Puerto Rico International | (Slovenia) Maja Tvrdy | 13–21, 21–12, 21–13 | (gold) Winner |

Women's doubles
| Year | Tournament | Partner | Opponent | Score | Result |
|---|---|---|---|---|---|
| 2003 | Nigeria International | (Canada) Denyse Julien | (Wales) Felicity Gallup (Wales) Joanne Muggeridge | 12–15, 6–15 | (silver) Runner-up |

BWF International Challenge tournament
BWF International Series tournament
