= Mesinee Mangkalakiri =

American badminton player

Personal information
- Born: April 21, 1983 (age 43) Los Alamitos, California
- Height: 1.70 m (5 ft 7 in)
- Weight: 61 kg (134 lb)

Sport
- Country: United States
- Sport: Badminton
- Handedness: Right
- Coached by: Tony Gunawan
- Event: Women's & mixed doubles

Women's & mixed doubles
- BWF profile
Medal record
Women's badminton
Representing the United States
Pan American Games
Gold medal – first place	2007 Rio de Janeiro	Women's doubles
Bronze medal – third place	2007 Rio de Janeiro	Mixed doubles
Bronze medal – third place	2003 Santo Domingo	Mixed doubles
Pan Am Championships
Silver medal – second place	2007 Calgary	Women's doubles
Silver medal – second place	2007 Calgary	Mixed team
Silver medal – second place	2005 Bridgetown	Mixed team
Bronze medal – third place	2007 Calgary	Mixed doubles

Mesinee "May" Mangkalakiri (Thai: เมษิณี มังคละคีรี; RTGS: Mesini Mangkhala-khiri; born April 21, 1983) is an American badminton player of Thai descent. She won a bronze medal, along with her partner Raju Rai, in the mixed doubles at the 2003 Pan American Games in Santo Domingo, Dominican Republic. She repeated her bronze medal performance with her new partner Bob Malaythong in the mixed doubles, and also, beat Canada's Fiona McKee and Charmaine Reid for the gold in the women's doubles at the 2007 Pan American Games in Rio de Janeiro, Brazil. Mangkalakiri is also a member of Orange County Badminton Club in Anaheim, California, and is coached and trained by former Olympic doubles champion Tony Gunawan (2000), who is currently playing for the United States.

Mangkalakiri qualified for the women's doubles at the 2008 Summer Olympics in Beijing, by placing fourteenth and receiving an allocated entry from the Badminton World Federation's ranking list. Mangkalakiri and her partner and former high school teammate Eva Lee, however, lost the preliminary round match to the Singaporean pair Jiang Yanmei and Li Yujia, with a score of 12–21 each in two straight periods.

== Achievements ==
=== Pan American Games ===
Women's doubles
Year	Venue	Partner	Opponent	Score	Result
2007	Riocentro Sports Complex Pavilion 4B; Rio de Janeiro, Brazil	(United States) Eva Lee	(Canada) Charmaine Reid (Canada) Fiona McKee	21-14, 21-15	Gold

Mixed doubles
Year	Venue	Partner	Opponent	Score	Result
2007	Riocentro Sports Complex Pavilion 4B; Rio de Janeiro, Brazil	(United States) Bob Malaythong	(Canada) Mike Beres (Canada) Valerie Loker	20–22, 21–19, 18–21	Bronze
2003	UASD Pavilion; Santo Domingo, Dominican Republic	(United States) Raju Rai	(Canada) Philippe Bourret (Canada) Denyse Julien	8–15, 7–15	Bronze

=== Pan Am Championships ===
Women's doubles
Year	Venue	Partner	Opponent	Score	Result
2007	Calgary Winter Club; Calgary, Canada	(United States) Eva Lee	(Canada) Fiona McKee (Canada) Charmaine Reid	20–22, 21–17, 18–21	Silver

Mixed doubles
Year	Venue	Partner	Opponent	Score	Result
2007	Calgary Winter Club; Calgary, Canada	(United States) Bob Malaythong	(Canada) Mike Beres (Canada) Valerie Loker	11–21, 20–22	Bronze

=== IBF World Grand Prix ===
The World Badminton Grand Prix sanctioned by International Badminton Federation (IBF) since 1983.

Mixed doubles
Year	Tournament	Partner	Opponent	Score	Result
2002	Puerto Rico Open	(Indonesia) Tony Gunawan	(Peru) Tjitte Weistra (Peru) Doriana Rivera	11–2, 11–3	(gold) Winner

=== BWF International Challenge/Series ===
Women's singles
Year	Tournament	Opponent	Score	Result
2001	Brazil International	(Italy) Agnese Allegrini	4–11, 2–11	(silver) Runner-up

Women's doubles
Year	Tournament	Partner	Opponent	Score	Result
2008	Banuinvest International	(United States) Eva Lee	(Russia) Olga Golovanova (Russia) Anastasia Prokopenko	18–21, 15–21	(silver) Runner-up
2007	Irish International	(United States) Eva Lee	(Republic of Ireland) Chloe Magee (Republic of Ireland) Bing Huang	15–21, 21–9, 11–21	(silver) Runner-up
2006	Canadian International	(United States) Eva Lee	(Germany) Caren Hückstädt (Switzerland) Huwaina Razi	21–13, 21–14	(gold) Winner
2001	USA Southern Pan Am International	(United States) Meiluawati	(Peru) Sandra Jimeno (Peru) Doriana Rivera	0–7, 7–3, 7–5	(gold) Winner

Mixed doubles
Year	Tournament	Partner	Opponent	Score	Result
2005	OCBC International	(United States) Bob Malaythong	(United States) Howard Bach (United States) Eva Lee	15–13, 15–12	(gold) Winner
2003	Guatemala International	(United States) Raju Rai	(Canada) Philippe Bourret (Canada) Denyse Julien	6–15, 9–15	(silver) Runner-up
2002	USA Southern Pan Am International	(Indonesia) Tony Gunawan	(Canada) Philippe Bourret (Canada) Denyse Julien	11–3, 11–5	(gold) Winner
2001	USA Southern Pan Am International	(United States) Bob Malaythong	(Trinidad and Tobago) Bradley Graham (Jamaica) Nigella Saunders	7–8, 7–5, 8–6	(gold) Winner

BWF International Challenge tournament
BWF International Series tournament
