= Helen Nichol (badminton) =

Canadian badminton player (born 1981)

Personal information
- Born: February 18, 1981 (age 45) Burlington, Ontario, Canada
- Height: 163 cm (5 ft 4 in)
- Weight: 68 kg (150 lb)

Sport
- Country: Canada
- Sport: Badminton
- Handedness: Right
- Event: Women's doubles and Mixed doubles

Women's doubles and Mixed doubles
- BWF profile
Medal record
Women's badminton
Representing Canada
Pan American Games
| Gold medal – first place | 2003 Santo Domingo | Women's doubles |
Pan American Championships
| Gold medal – first place | 2001 Lima | Women's doubles |
| Gold medal – first place | 2004 Lima | Mixed Team |
| Gold medal – first place | 2005 Bridgetown | Women's doubles |
| Silver medal – second place | 2005 Bridgetown | Mixed doubles |

Helen Nichol (born 18 February 1981 in Burlington, Ontario) is a female badminton player from Canada, who won the gold medal in the women's doubles competition at the 2003 Pan American Games, partnering Charmaine Reid.

Nichol competed in badminton at the 2004 Summer Olympics in women's doubles with partner Charmaine Reid. They were defeated by Cheng Wen-Hsing and Chien Yu Chin of Taiwan in the round of 32.

== Achievements ==
=== Pan American Games ===
Women's doubles
| Year | Venue | Partner | Opponent | Score | Result |
|---|---|---|---|---|---|
| 2003 | UASD Pavilion; Santo Domingo, Dominican Republic | (Canada) Charmaine Reid | (Canada) Denyse Julien (Canada) Anna Rice | 15–13, 15–10 | Gold |

=== Pan American Championships ===
Women's doubles
| Year | Venue | Partner | Opponent | Score | Result |
|---|---|---|---|---|---|
| 2001 | Lima, Peru | (Canada) Milaine Cloutier | (Canada) Jody Patrick (Canada) Charmaine Reid | 7–3, 8–6, 7–0 | Gold |
| 2005 | Bridgetown, Barbados | (Canada) Charmaine Reid | (Canada) Milaine Cloutier (Canada) Denyse Julien | walkover | Gold |

Mixed doubles
| Year | Venue | Partner | Opponent | Score | Result |
|---|---|---|---|---|---|
| 2005 | Bridgetown, Barbados | (Canada) Philippe Bourret | (Canada) Mike Beres (Canada) Jody Patrick | 17–16, 8–15, 9–15 | Silver |

=== IBF World Grand Prix ===
The World Badminton Grand Prix was sanctioned by the International Badminton Federation from 1983 to 2006.

Women's doubles
| Year | Tournament | Partner | Opponent | Score | Result |
|---|---|---|---|---|---|
| 2002 | Puerto Rico Open | (Canada) Charmaine Reid | (Wales) Felicity Gallup (Wales) Joanne Muggeridge | 3–11, 3–11 | (silver) Runner-up |

=== IBF International ===
Women's doubles
| Year | Tournament | Partner | Opponent | Score | Result |
|---|---|---|---|---|---|
| 2003 | Brazil International | (Canada) Charmaine Reid | (Wales) Felicity Gallup (Wales) Joanne Muggeridge | 15–11, 15–13 | (gold) Winner |
| 2003 | Dominican Republic International | (Canada) Charmaine Reid | (Iceland) Ragna Ingólfsdóttir (Iceland) Sara Jónsdóttir | 15–7, 15–9 | (gold) Winner |
| 2003 | Carebaco International | (Canada) Charmaine Reid | (Japan) Yoshiko Iwata (Japan) Miyuki Tai | 5–15, 5–15 | (silver) Runner-up |
| 2003 | Giraldilla International | (Canada) Charmaine Reid | (Japan) Yoshiko Iwata (Japan) Miyuki Tai | 6–15, 4–15 | (silver) Runner-up |
| 2004 | Canadian International | (Canada) Charmaine Reid | (England) Liza Parker (England) Suzanne Rayappan | 11–15, 0–15 | (silver) Runner-up |
| 2004 | Carebaco International | (Canada) Charmaine Reid | (Canada) Sarah MacMaster (Canada) Valérie Loker | 15–7, 15–6 | (gold) Winner |
| 2004 | Peru International | (Canada) Charmaine Reid | (Japan) Yoshiko Iwata (Japan) Miyuki Tai | 3–15, 15–6, 8–15 | (silver) Runner-up |
| 2005 | Carebaco International | (Canada) Charmaine Reid | (Canada) Valérie Loker (Canada) Tammy Sun | 15–3, 12–15, 17–14 | (gold) Winner |
| 2005 | Peru International | (Canada) Charmaine Reid | (Japan) Noriko Okuma (Japan) Miyuki Tai | 4–15, 5–15 | (silver) Runner-up |
| 2005 | Giraldilla International | (Canada) Charmaine Reid | (Spain) Anabel Chafer Munoz (Spain) Lucía Tavera | 15–3, 15–6 | (gold) Winner |
| 2005 | São Paulo International | (Canada) Charmaine Reid | (Canada) Florence Lavoie (Canada) Amélie Felx | 17–15, 15–9 | (gold) Winner |
