= Tadashi Ōtsuka =

Japanese badminton player (born 1978)

Personal information
- Born: April 30, 1978 (age 48) (Japan) Nagasaki
- Height: 1.7 m (5 ft 7 in)

Sport
- Country: Japan
- Sport: Badminton
- Handedness: Right

Men's Doubles
- Current ranking: 9 (September 25, 2008)
- BWF profile

Tadashi Ohtsuka (大束忠司, Ōtsuka Tadashi; born 30 April 1978) is a male badminton player from Japan.

== Career ==
Otsuka competed in badminton at the 2004 Summer Olympics in men's doubles with partner Keita Masuda. They had a bye in the first round, then were defeated in the round of 16 by Fu Haifeng and Cai Yun of China. He also competed in mixed doubles with partner Shizuka Yamamoto. They were defeated in the round of 32 by Robert Blair and Natalie Munt of Great Britain.

Ohtsuka played at the 2007 BWF World Championships in men's doubles with Keita Masuda, and were defeated in the third round by the eventual champions Markis Kido and Hendra Setiawan, of Indonesia, 22-20, 21-19.

== Coaching and academic career ==
Following his retirement from competitive play, Ōtsuka transitioned into coaching and academia. He is currently an Associate Professor in the Department of Physical Education at Nippon Sport Science University.

== Achievements ==
=== BWF Grand Prix (1 title, 1 runner-up) ===
The BWF Grand Prix had two levels, the BWF Grand Prix and Grand Prix Gold. It was a series of badminton tournaments sanctioned by the Badminton World Federation (BWF) which was held from 2007 to 2017. The World Badminton Grand Prix has been sanctioned by International Badminton Federation (IBF) from 1983 to 2006.

Men's doubles
| Year | Tournament | Partner | Opponent | Score | Result |
|---|---|---|---|---|---|
| 2005 | Dutch Open | (Japan) Keita Masuda | (Malaysia) Choong Tan Fook (Malaysia) Lee Wan Wah | 7–15, 4–15 | (silver) Runner-up |
| 2007 | U.S. Open | (Japan) Keita Masuda | (United States) Howard Bach (United States) Khan Malaythong | 21–18, 21–11 | (gold) Winner |

BWF Grand Prix tournament
IBF World Grand Prix tournament

=== IBF International Challenge/Series (5 titles, 4 runners-up) ===
Men's doubles
| Year | Tournament | Partner | Opponent | Score | Result | Ref. |
|---|---|---|---|---|---|---|
| 1999 | Mexico International | (Japan) Keita Masuda | (Hong Kong) Ma Che Kong (Hong Kong) Yau Tsz Yuk | 7–15, 15–13, 10–15 | (silver) Runner-up | |
| 2000 | Cuba International | (Japan) Keita Masuda | (Spain) José Antonio Crespo (Spain) Sergio Llopis | 15–9, 15–2 | (gold) Winner | |
| 2000 | French International | (Japan) Keita Masuda | (Japan) Takuya Katayama (Japan) Yuzo Kubota | 15–6, 15–11 | (gold) Winner | |
| 2003 | Waikato International | (Japan) Keita Masuda | (Singapore) Hendri Saputra (Singapore) Denny Setiawan | 7–15, 15–12, 3–15 | (silver) Runner-up | |
| 2003 | Guatemala International | (Japan) Keita Masuda | (United States) Howard Bach (United States) Kevin Han | 15–6, 15–12 | (gold) Winner | |
| 2004 | Iran Fajr International | (Japan) Keita Masuda | (Hong Kong) Liu Kwok Wa (Hong Kong) Albertus Susanto Njoto | 4–15, 11–15 | (silver) Runner-up | |
| 2004 | Mauritius International | (Japan) Keita Masuda | (Hong Kong) Liu Kwok Wa (Hong Kong) Albertus Susanto Njoto | 15–11, 15–8 | (gold) Winner | |

Mixed doubles
| Year | Tournament | Partner | Opponent | Score | Result | Ref. |
|---|---|---|---|---|---|---|
| 2003 | Mauritius International | (Japan) Shizuka Yamamoto | (Germany) Kristof Hopp (Germany) Kathrin Piotrowski | 10–15, 15–7, 15–7 | (gold) Winner | |
| 2003 | Waikato International | (Japan) Shizuka Yamamoto | (New Zealand) Daniel Shirley (New Zealand) Sara Petersen | 4–15, 8–15 | (silver) Runner-up | |

BWF International Series tournament
