= USA International =

Badminton championships

The USA International is an international badminton tournament held in United States since 1998. This tournament formerly known as Miami PanAm International or Southern PanAm Classic and belongs to Badminton Pan Am.

== Previous winners ==
Year	Men's singles	Women's singles	Men's doubles	Women's doubles	Mixed doubles	Notes
1998	(United States) Kevin Han	(United States) Cindy Shi	(United States) Kevin Han (United States) Howard Bach	(United States) Penelope Salac (United States) Cindy Shi	(United States) Howard Bach (United States) Cindy Shi	Miami International; BWF International Series
1999	(United States) Kevin Han	(Peru) Lorena Blanco	(United States) Kevin Han (United States) Alex Liang	(Peru) Ximena Bellido (Peru) Lorena Blanco	(Peru) José Antonio Iturriaga (Peru) Ximena Bellido	Southern Miami International; BWF International Series
2000	(United States) Kevin Han	(United States) Kokoe Tanaka	(United States) Kevin Han (United States) Mathew Fogarty	(United States) Lina Taft (United States) Kokoe Tanaka	(United States) Andy Chong (United States) Kokoe Tanaka	Pan American Classic; BWF International Series
2001	(United States) Kevin Han	(United States) Meiluawati	(United States) Kevin Han (United States) Howard Bach	(United States) Mesinee Mangkalakiri (United States) Meiluawati	(United States) Khankham Malaythong (United States) Mesinee Mangkalakiri	Panam Southern Classic; BWF International Series
2002	(Netherlands) Tjitte Weistra	(Canada) Jody Patrick	(United States) Khankham Malaythong (United States) Tony Gunawan	(Canada) Denyse Julien (Canada) Florence Lavoie	(United States) Tony Gunawan (United States) Mesinee Mangkalakiri	USA Southern Pan Am Classic; BWF International Series
2003	(Canada) Andrew Dabeka	(Japan) Kanako Yonekura	(Spain) José Antonio Crespo (Spain) Sergio Llopis	(Japan) Yoshiko Iwata (Japan) Miyuki Tai	(Canada) Mike Beres (Canada) Jody Patrick	Southern Panam Classic; BWF International Series
2005	(Japan) Keishi Kawaguchi	(Wales) Yuan Wemyss	(Denmark) Simon Mollyhus (Denmark) Anders Kristiansen	(Japan) Miyuki Tai (Japan) Noriko Okuma	(Canada) Mike Beres (Canada) Jody Patrick	Southern PanAm Int'l; BWF International Series
2006	(Denmark) Kasper Ødum	(Finland) Nina Weckström	(Canada) William Milroy (Canada) Mike Beres	(Canada) Amélie Felx (Canada) Florence Lavoie	(Denmark) Leon Aabenhus (Denmark) Mette Schjoldager	Southern PanAm Intl; BWF International Series
2007	(Canada) Andrew Dabeka	(Hong Kong) Zhou Mi	(Canada) Mike Beres (Canada) William Milroy	(United States) Jamie Subandhi (United States) Kuei Ya Chen	(Canada) Mike Beres (Canada) Valérie Loker	Miami Pan Am; BWF International Series
2008	(Guatemala) Kevin Cordón	(Peru) Claudia Rivero	(United States) Daniel Gouw (United States) Chandra Kowi	(Australia) Tania Luiz (Australia) Eugenia Tanaka	(Peru) Andrés Corpancho (Peru) Cristina Aicardi	Miami PanAm; BWF International Series
2009	(United States) Hock Lai Lee	(Canada) Joycelyn Ko	(United States) Sameera Gunatileka (United States) Vincent Nguy	(United States) Priscilla Lun (United States) Paula Lynn Obañana	(United States) Hock Lai Lee (United States) Priscilla Lun	Miami PanAm; BWF Future Series
2010	(Guatemala) Kevin Cordón	(Italy) Agnese Allegrini	(United States) Sameera Gunatileka (United States) Vincent Nguy	(Germany) Nicole Grether (Canada) Charmaine Reid	(United States) Hock Lai Lee (United States) Priscilla Lun	Bill Graham Miami PanAm; BWF Future Series
2011	(Sri Lanka) Niluka Karunaratne	(Greece) Anne Hald	(Brazil) Hugo Arthuso (Brazil) Daniel Paiola	(Brazil) Lohaynny Vicente (Brazil) Luana Vicente	(United States) Phillip Chew (United States) Paula Lynn Obañana	Bill Graham Miami International; BWF Future Series
2012	(Malaysia) Lim Fang Yang	(United States) Jamie Subandhi	(France) Laurent Constantin (France) Florent Riancho	(France) Perrine Lebuhanic (France) Andréa Vanderstukken	(France) Laurent Constantin (France) Andréa Vanderstukken	Bill Graham Miami International; BWF International Series
2013	(United States) Hock Lai Lee	(United States) Beiwen Zhang	(United States) Christian Christianto (United States) Hock Lai Lee	(United States) Jing Yu Hong (United States) Beiwen Zhang	(Canada) Toby Ng (Canada) Michelle Li	Yonex USA International; BWF International Challenge
2014	(Sweden) Henri Hurskainen	(Japan) Kaori Imabeppu	(Japan) Takurō Hoki (Japan) Yugo Kobayashi	(Japan) Naoko Fukuman (Japan) Kurumi Yonao	(Canada) Toby Ng (Canada) Alex Bruce	Yonex USA International; BWF International Challenge
2015	(Denmark) Emil Holst	(United States) Beiwen Zhang	(Chinese Taipei) Lin Chia-yu (Chinese Taipei) Wu Hsiao-lin	(England) Heather Olver (England) Lauren Smith	(Germany) Michael Fuchs (Germany) Birgit Michels	Yonex USA International; BWF International Challenge
2016	(Italy) Indra Bagus Ade Chandra	(Italy) Jeanine Cicognini	(Indonesia) David Yedija Pohan (Indonesia) Ricky Alverino Sidharta	(Mexico) Nicole Marquez (Mexico) Adelina Quiñones	(Indonesia) David Yedija Pohan (Indonesia) Jenna Gozali	Manhattan Beach USA International; BWF International Series
