= Kevin Han =

American badminton player (born 1972)

Kevin Han 韓奇

Personal information
- Full name: Kevin Han Qi
- Country: United States
- Born: 25 November 1972 (age 52); Shanghai, China
- Height: 1.87 m (6 ft 2 in)
- Weight: 86 kg (190 lb)
- Handedness: Left
- Event: Men's singles & Men's doubles
Medal record
Men's badminton
Representing United States
Pan American Games
Bronze medal – third place	Mar del Plata 1995	Singles
Silver medal – second place	Mar del Plata 1995	Doubles
Gold medal – first place	Winnipeg 1999	Singles
Gold medal – first place	Santo Domingo 2003	Doubles
Pan Am Badminton Championships
Gold medal – first place	1997 Calgary	Singles
Gold medal – first place	1997 Calgary	Doubles
Gold medal – first place	2001 Lima	Singles
Gold medal – first place	2001 Lima	Doubles

Kevin Qi Han (born November 25, 1972) is an American badminton player who won the bronze medal in the inaugural men's singles competition at the 1995 Pan American Games, followed by the gold medal four years later in Winnipeg, Manitoba, Canada. He was the first ever American player to captured the World Grand Prix title by winning the 1995 Bulgarian Open in the men's doubles with Thomas Reidy.

== Career ==
=== Olympics ===
Han competed in badminton at the 2004 Summer Olympics in men's doubles with partner Howard Bach. They defeated Dorian James and Stewart Carson of South Africa in the first round, then were defeated in the round of 16 by Jens Eriksen and Martin Lundgaard Hansen of Denmark.

=== Pan Am Games ===
Kevin Han won a bronze medal, a silver medal and two gold medals at the Pan American Games. In 1995 he won bronze in the inaugural men's singles competition at the 1995 Pan American Games, followed by silver medal in men's doubles with partner Thomas Reidy losing the 1995 Pan Am Games final to Canadians Anil Kaul & Iain Sydie. He finally won a gold medal at the 1999 Pan American Games in men's singles, beating Canadian Stuart Arthur in the final and also a gold medal in men's doubles with partner Howard Bach at the 2003 Pan American Games beating the pair from Guatemala Pedro Alejandro Yang and Erick Anguiano in the final.

=== Pan Am Badminton Championships ===
Kevin Han won gold in both singles and doubles at two Pan Am Badminton Championships in Calgary 1997 and Lima 2001.

=== National Championships ===
Kevin Han was first place in seven singles and three doubles U.S. National Badminton Championships. In the 1994, 1995, 1997, 1998, 1999, 2000 & 2002 he took the U.S. National Men's singles titles and in 1996 & 1997 (with Tom Reidy), and in 1999 (with Alex Liang) and also in 2001, 2002 & 2004 (with Howard Bach) he took the Men's doubles U.S. National badminton titles.
