= Si-An Deng =

Canadian badminton player (born 1963)

Si-An Deng 邓思安
Personal information
- Born: 25 June 1963 (age 62) Shanghai, People's Republic of China
- Height: 1.63 m (5 ft 4 in)

Sport
- Country: Canada
- Sport: Badminton
- Handedness: Right
- BWF profile
Medal record
Women's Badminton
Representing Canada
Commonwealth Games
Silver medal – second place	1994 Victoria	Women's singles
Bronze medal – third place	1994 Victoria	Women's doubles
Pan American Games
Gold medal – first place	1995 Mar del Plata	Women's doubles
Silver medal – second place	1995 Mar del Plata	Women's singles
Silver medal – second place	1995 Mar del Plata	Mixed doubles

Si-An Deng (born June 25, 1963 in Shanghai, People's Republic of China is a retired female badminton player from Canada.

Deng won the silver medal in the inaugural women's singles competition at the 1995 Pan American Games. She also claimed gold at that same tournament in the women's doubles. A resident of Vancouver, British Columbia, she represented Canada at the 1996 Summer Olympics in Atlanta, Georgia.
