= Jaimie Dawson =

Canadian badminton player (born 1969)

Medal record

Men's badminton

Representing Canada

Pan American Games
Gold medal – first place	Mar del Plata 1995	Singles

Jaimie Dawson (born July 28, 1969 in Geneva, Switzerland) is a badminton player from Canada, who won the gold medal in the inaugural men's singles competition at the 1995 Pan American Games. A resident of Winnipeg, Manitoba, he represented Canada at the 1996 Summer Olympics.

Dawson was a Canadian Junior Champion in Boys Singles, Boys Doubles and Mixed Doubles in the same year.

Dawson won the French Open in Men’s Singles in 1991.

In 2017, Dawson was inducted into the Manitoba Sports Hall of Fame.
