= Philippe Bourret =

Canadian badminton player (born 1979)

Philippe Bourret (born 24 April 1979) is a male badminton player from Canada.

Bourret competed in badminton at the 2004 Summer Olympics in mixed doubles with partner Denyse Julien. They lost to Daniel Shirley and Sara Petersen of New Zealand in the round of 32. In 2003, he won the gold medal at the Pan American Games in the mixed doubles.

== Bibliography ==
- "La reprise des activités parascolaires : Entrevue avec Philippe Bourret". ici.radio-canada.ca (in French). 15 March 2021.
- "Badminton : Philippe Bourret de retour avec les Carabins". RDS.ca (in French). 22 January 2004.
- "Badminton: Cold reality for doubles combo". The New Zealand Herald. 16 August 2004.
- "Vivieca, Javier y Cabrera, por plata en badminton". Diario Libre (in Spanish). 3 November 2012.
- "Philippe Bourret nommé gérant de l'équipe du Québec pour les Jeux du Canada 2023". Badminton Québec (in French). n.d.
- "Badminton Canada Introduces a New Board of Directors". Badminton Canada. 6 July 2016.
- "Winnipeg's Solmundson wins third straight badminton title". 7 January 2002.
- sports-reference.com
- tournamentsoftware.com
