= 1988 Thomas Cup qualification =

Tournament details
- Dates: 23 – 28 February 1988
- Location: Asian zone: New Delhi American zone: San Jose; European zone: Amsterdam Oceania zone: Melbourne

The qualifying process for the 1988 Thomas Cup took place from 23 to 28 February 1988 to decide the final teams which will play in the final tournament.

== Qualification process ==
The qualification process will be divided into four regions, the Asian Zone, the European Zone, the Oceania Zone and the Pan American Zone. Teams in their respective zone will first compete in a round-robin elimination format. The top two teams will advance to the knockout stages to compete for a place in the final tournament to be held in Kuala Lumpur.

China qualified for the final tournament as defending champions while Malaysia qualified as hosts.

=== Qualified teams ===
Country	Qualified as	Qualified on	Final appearance
Malaysia	1988 Thomas Cup hosts	6 October 1987	12th
China	1986 Thomas Cup winners	4 May 1986	4th
India	Asian Zone winners	27 February 1988	5th
Denmark	European Zone winners	28 February 1988	15th
England	European Zone runners-up	28 February 1988	4th
Sweden	Third place in European Zone	28 February 1988	3rd
Indonesia	Oceania Zone winners	28 February 1988	12th
South Korea	American Zone winners	27 February 1988	3rd

== Asian Zone ==
The qualification rounds for the Asian Zone were held from 23 to 27 February at the Indira Gandhi Indoor Stadium in New Delhi, India. Five teams took part in qualifying for the final tournament.

=== Round robin ===
Pos	Team	Pld	W	L	MF	MA	MD	Pts	Qualification
1	India	4	4	0	16	4	+12	4	Final tournament
2	Japan	4	3	1	17	3	+14	3	
3	Thailand	4	2	2	12	8	+4	2	
4	Nepal	4	1	3	3	17	−14	1	
5	Sri Lanka	4	0	4	2	20	−18	0	

Source: The Straits Times

Japan
5
Indira Gandhi Indoor Stadium
23 February 1988

Sri Lanka
0

		Result
1	Hiroshi Nishiyama	2 – 0 (15–11, 18–16)	Niroshan Wijekoon
2	Shinji Matsuura	2 – 0 (18–15, 15–11)	Udaya Weerakoon
3	Hiroki Etō	2 – 0 (15–6, 15–11)	Prasanna Gunasekera
4	Shuji Matsuno; Shinji Matsuura	2 – 0 (15–5, 15–8)	Udaya Weerakoon; Niroshan Wijekoon
5	Tetsuaki Inoue; Tatsuya Yanagiya	2 – 0 (15–10, 15–2)	Duminda Jayakody; Nihal Sendanayake

India
5
Indira Gandhi Indoor Stadium
23 February 1988

Nepal
0

		Result
1	Syed Modi	2 – 0 (15–9, 15–5)	Prakash Rana
2	U. Vimal Kumar	2 – 0 (15–7, 15–2)	Ramji Bahadur Shrestha
3	Prakash Padukone	2 – 0 (15–0, 15–1)	Naresh Bahadur Singh
4	Ravi Kunte; Uday Pawar	2 – 0 (15–5, 15–8)	Pratap Adhikari; Prakash Rana
5	Partho Ganguli; Vikram Singh	2 – 0 (15–1, 15–3)	Anoj Basnet; Lava Shrestha

Thailand
5
Indira Gandhi Indoor Stadium
24 February 1988

Nepal
0

		Result
1	Pramote Teerawiwatana	2 – 0 (15–1, 15–5)	Lava Shrestha
2	Karoon Kasayapanan	2 – 0 (15–1, 15–8)	Bal Shankar Shrestha
3	Surachai Makkasasithorn	2 – 0 (15–4, 15–2)	Anoj Basnet
4	Sawei Chanseorasmee; Sakrapee Thongsari	2 – 0 (15–1, 15–7)	Ramji Bahadur Shrestha; Naresh Bahadur Singh
5	Komchan Promsarin; Siripong Siripool	2 – 0 (15–3, 15–3)	Pratap Adhikari; Prakash Rana

India
5
Indira Gandhi Indoor Stadium
24 February 1988

Sri Lanka
0

		Result
1	Syed Modi	2 – 1 (11–15, 15–7, 15–6)	Niroshan Wijekoon
2	U. Vimal Kumar	2 – 0 (15–6, 15–4)	Udaya Weerakoon
3	Prakash Padukone	2 – 0 (15–3, 15–2)	Prasanna Gunasekera
4	Partho Ganguli; Vikram Singh	2 – 0 (15–11, 15–9)	Udaya Weerakoon; Niroshan Wijekoon
5	Prakash Padukone; Uday Pawar	2 – 0 (15–3, 15–4)	Prasanna Gunasekera; Nihal Sendanayake

Japan
2
Indira Gandhi Indoor Stadium
25 February 1988

India
3

		Result
1	Hiroshi Nishiyama	0 – 2 (9–15, 3–15)	Syed Modi
2	Shinji Matsuura	2 – 0 (15–12, 15–12)	U. Vimal Kumar
3	Shuji Matsuno	0 – 2 (3–15, 3–15)	Prakash Padukone
4	Shuji Matsuno; Shinji Matsuura	2 – 0 (15–0, 15–6)	Partho Ganguli; Vikram Singh
5	Tetsuaki Inoue; Hiroshi Nishiyama	0 – 2 (5–15, 15–17)	Prakash Padukone; Uday Pawar

Thailand
5
Indira Gandhi Indoor Stadium
25 February 1988

Sri Lanka
0

		Result
1	Sompol Kukasemkij	2 – 1 (11–15, 15–12, 15–0)	Niroshan Wijekoon
2	Pramote Teerawiwatana	2 – 0 (15–12, 15–9)	Udaya Weerakoon
3	Karoon Kasayapanan	2 – 0 (15–7, 15–5)	Prasanna Gunasekera
4	Sawei Chanseorasmee; Sakrapee Thongsari	2 – 0 (15–4, 15–3)	Udaya Weerakoon; Niroshan Wijekoon
5	Komchan Promsarin; Siripong Siripool	2 – 0 (15–4, 15–3)	Prasanna Gunasekera; Nihal Sendanayake

Japan
5
Indira Gandhi Indoor Stadium
26 February 1988

Thailand
0

		Result
1	Hiroshi Nishiyama	2 – 0 (18–15, 15–10)	Sompol Kukasemkij
2	Shinji Matsuura	2 – 0 (15–11, 15–9)	Karoon Kasayapanan
3	Shuji Matsuno	2 – 0 (15–4, 15–7)	Surachai Makkasasithorn
4	Shuji Matsuno; Shinji Matsuura	2 – 1 (13–18, 15–2, 15–8)	Sawei Chanseorasmee; Sakrapee Thongsari
5	Hiroki Etō; Tatsuya Yanagiya	2 – 1 (14–18, 15–5, 18–16)	Komchan Promsarin; Siripong Siripool

Sri Lanka
2
Indira Gandhi Indoor Stadium
26 February 1988

Nepal
3

		Result
1	Niroshan Wijekoon	2 – 0 (15–10, 15–6)	Prakash Rana
2	Udaya Weerakoon	1 – 2 (12–15, 15–4, 14–18)	Ramji Bahadur Shrestha
3	Prasanna Gunasekera	1 – 2 (15–11, 2–15, 12–15)	Pratap Adhikari
4	Udaya Weerakoon; Niroshan Wijekoon	2 – 0 (15–7, 15–5)	Ramji Bahadur Shrestha; Naresh Bahadur Singh
5	Prasanna Gunasekera; Duminda Jayakody	0 – 2 (14–18, 6–15)	Pratap Adhikari; Prakash Rana

India
3
Indira Gandhi Indoor Stadium
27 February 1988

Thailand
2

		Result
1	Syed Modi	0 – 2 (4–15, 8–15)	Sompol Kukasemkij
2	U. Vimal Kumar	2 – 0 (15–2, 18–17)	Pramote Teerawiwatana
3	Prakash Padukone	2 – 0 (15–1, 15–5)	Surachai Makkasasithorn
4	Partho Ganguli; Vikram Singh	0 – 2 (8–15, 12–15)	Sawei Chanseorasmee; Sakrapee Thongsari
5	Prakash Padukone; Uday Pawar	2 – 1 (10–15, 15–12, 17–15)	Komchan Promsarin; Siripong Siripool

Japan
5
Indira Gandhi Indoor Stadium
27 February 1988

Nepal
0

		Result
1	Hiroshi Nishiyama	2 – 0	Prakash Rana
2	Shinji Matsuura	2 – 0	Ramji Bahadur Shrestha
3	Hiroki Etō	2 – 0	Pratap Adhikari
4	Shuji Matsuno; Shinji Matsuura	2 – 0	Ramji Bahadur Shrestha; Naresh Bahadur Singh
5	Tetsuaki Inoue; Tatsuya Yanagiya	2 – 0	Pratap Adhikari; Prakash Rana

== European Zone ==
The European qualifying rounds were held in Sporthallen Zuid in Amsterdam, Netherlands. Seventeen teams took part in the qualifiers with Spain making their debut in the competition.

=== Group stage ===
==== Group A ====
Pos	Team	Pld	W	L	MF	MA	MD	Pts	Qualification
1	Denmark	3	3	0	15	0	+15	3	Advance to knockout stage
2	Wales	3	2	1	9	6	+3	2	
3	Belgium	3	1	2	6	10	−4	1	
4	Spain	3	0	3	0	15	−15	0	

Source: The Straits Times

Wales
5
Sporthallen Zuid
25 February 1988

Spain
0

		Result
1	Chris Rees	2 – 0 (15–0, 15–1)	Ángel Fernández
2	Andrew Spencer	2 – 0 (15–4, 15–9)	Juan Amaro
3	Peter Hybart	2 – 0 (15–0, 15–5)	Enrique Lago
4	Chris Rees; Andrew Spencer	2 – 0 (15–3, 15–5)	Pedro Blach; Enrique Lago
5	Peter Hybart; Giles Pierce	2 – 0 (15–3, 15–6)	Ángel Fernández; Javier Vidal

Denmark
5
Sporthallen Zuid
25 February 1988

Belgium
0

		Result
1	Morten Frost	2 – 0	Eddy van Herbruggen
2	Ib Frederiksen	2 – 0	Jan de Mulder
3	Torben Carlsen	2 – 0	Christian Bene
4	Steen Fladberg; Jan Paulsen	2 – 0	Jan de Mulder; Filip Vigneron
5	Mark Christiansen; Michael Kjeldsen	2 – 0	Eddy van Herbruggen; Dario van Nauw

Denmark
5
Sporthallen Zuid
25 February 1988

Spain
0

		Result
1	Ib Frederiksen	2 – 0	Enrique Ruiz
2	Torben Carlsen	2 – 0	Ángel Fernández
3	Michael Kjeldsen	2 – 0	Enrique Lago
4	Max Gandrup; Thomas Lund	2 – 0	Pedro Blach; Enrique Lago
5	Mark Christiansen; Michael Kjeldsen	2 – 0	Ángel Fernández; Enrique Ruiz

Wales
5
Sporthallen Zuid
26 February 1988

Belgium
0

		Result
1	Chris Rees	2 – 0	Eddy van Herbruggen
2	Barry Burns	2 – 0	Alain de Leeuw
3	Andrew Spencer	1 – 2	Jan de Mulder
4	Chris Rees; Lyndon Williams	2 – 0	Jan de Mulder; Dario van Nauw
5	Barry Burns; Andrew Spencer	2 – 0	Alain de Leeuw; Eddy van Herbruggen

Denmark
5
Sporthallen Zuid
26 February 1988

Wales
0

		Result
1	Morten Frost	2 – 0 (15–2, 15–0)	Chris Rees
2	Ib Frederiksen	2 – 0 (15–3, 15–3)	Andrew Spencer
3	Poul-Erik Høyer Larsen	2 – 0 (15–8, 15–5)	Peter Hybart
4	Steen Fladberg; Jan Paulsen	2 – 0 (15–0, 15–4)	Chris Rees; Andrew Spencer
5	Mark Christiansen; Jens Peter Nierhoff	2 – 0 (15–6, 15–11)	Peter Hybart; Giles Pierce

Belgium
5
Sporthallen Zuid
26 February 1988

Spain
0

		Result
1	Alain de Leeuw	2 – 0	Ángel Fernández
2	Jan de Mulder	2 – 0	Enrique Lago
3	Christian Bene	2 – 0	Pedro Blach
4	Alain de Leeuw; Jan de Mulder	2 – 0	Enrique Lago; Enrique Ruiz
5	Christian Bene; Filip Vigneron	2 – 0	Pedro Blach; Ángel Fernández

==== Group B ====
Pos	Team	Pld	W	L	MF	MA	MD	Pts	Qualification
1	Sweden	3	3	0	15	0	+15	3	Advance to knockout stage
2	Iceland	3	2	1	6	9	−3	2	
3	Finland	3	1	2	5	10	−5	1	
4	Austria	3	0	3	4	11	−7	0	

Source: The Straits Times

Sweden
5
Sporthallen Zuid
24 February 1988

Iceland
0

		Result
1	Ulf Johansson	2 – 0 (15–4, 15–6)	Broddi Kristjánsson
2	Jonas Herrgårdh	2 – 0 (15–4, 15–5)	Guðmundur Adolfsson
3	Jörgen Tuvesson	2 – 0 (15–4, 15–6)	Þorsteinn Páll Hængsson
4	Jan-Eric Antonsson; Pär-Gunnar Jönsson	2 – 0 (15–1, 15–4)	Þorsteinn Páll Hængsson; Broddi Kristjánsson
5	Peter Axelsson; Stefan Karlsson	2 – 0 (15–4, 15–6)	Árni Þór Hallgrímsson; Ármann Þorvaldsson

Finland
3
Sporthallen Zuid
24 February 1988

Austria
2

		Result
1	Pontus Jäntti	2 – 0	Heinz Fischer
2	Mika Heinonen	1 – 2	Klaus Fischer
3	Tony Tuominen	2 – 1	Tariq Farooq
4	Mika Heinonen; Tony Tuominen	0 – 2	Heinz Fischer; Klaus Fischer
5	Pontus Jäntti; Lasse Lindelöf	2 – 1	Alexander Almer; Heimo Götschl

Sweden
5
Sporthallen Zuid
25 February 1988

Finland
0

		Result
1	Ulf Johansson	2 – 1 (9–15, 15–9, 15–7)	Pontus Jäntti
2	Jonas Herrgårdh	2 – 0 (15–8, 15–4)	Tony Tuominen
3	Jens Olsson	2 – 0 (15–8, 15–0)	Jyri Aalto
4	Jan-Eric Antonsson; Pär-Gunnar Jönsson	2 – 0 (15–1, 15–11)	Mika Heinonen; Tony Tuominen
5	Peter Axelsson; Stefan Karlsson	2 – 0 (15–5, 15–0)	Jyri Aalto; Lasse Lindelöf

Austria
2
Sporthallen Zuid
25 February 1988

Iceland
3

		Result
1	Heinz Fischer	0 – 2 (4–15, 8–15)	Broddi Kristjánsson
2	Klaus Fischer	2 – 0 (15–3, 15–6)	Guðmundur Adolfsson
3	Tariq Farooq	2 – 0 (15–7, 15–3)	Þorsteinn Páll Hængsson
4	Heinz Fischer; Klaus Fischer	0 – 2 (3–15, 8–15)	Þorsteinn Páll Hængsson; Broddi Kristjánsson
5	Alexander Almer; Tariq Farooq	0 – 2 (8–15, 15–17)	Árni Þór Hallgrímsson; Ármann Þorvaldsson

Sweden
5
Sporthallen Zuid
26 February 1988

Austria
0

		Result
1	Ulf Johansson	2 – 0 (15–10, 17–15)	Heinz Fischer
2	Jonas Herrgårdh	2 – 0 (15–12, 15–0)	Klaus Fischer
3	Jens Olsson	2 – 0 (15–2, 15–3)	Tariq Farooq
4	Jan-Eric Antonsson; Pär-Gunnar Jönsson	2 – 0 (15–2, 15–2)	Heinz Fischer; Klaus Fischer
5	Peter Axelsson; Stefan Karlsson	2 – 0 (15–1, 15–1)	Alexander Almer; Heimo Götschl

Iceland
3
Sporthallen Zuid
26 February 1988

Finland
2

		Result
1	Broddi Kristjánsson	2 – 1 (15–10, 11–15, 17–14)	Pontus Jäntti
2	Árni Þór Hallgrímsson	2 – 1 (12–15, 15–6, 15–4)	Mika Heinonen
3	Guðmundur Adolfsson	1 – 2 (15–13, 9–15, 6–15)	Tony Tuominen
4	Þorsteinn Páll Hængsson; Broddi Kristjánsson	1 – 2 (4–15, 15–6, 15–18)	Mika Heinonen; Tony Tuominen
5	Árni Þór Hallgrímsson; Ármann Þorvaldsson	2 – 0 (15–6, 15–8)	Pontus Jäntti; Lasse Lindelöf

==== Group C ====
Pos	Team	Pld	W	L	MF	MA	MD	Pts	Qualification
1	Netherlands	4	4	0	18	2	+16	4	Advance to knockout stage
2	Norway	4	3	1	13	7	+6	3	
3	West Germany	4	2	2	12	8	+4	2	
4	Ireland	4	1	3	7	13	−6	1	
5	Mozambique	4	0	4	0	20	−20	0	

Source: The Straits Times

Netherlands
4
Sporthallen Zuid
24 February 1988

Norway
1

		Result
1	Pierre Pelupessy	2 – 1 (14–18, 15–8, 15–10)	Hans Sperre Jr.
2	Lex Coene	2 – 0 (17–14, 15–7)	Øyvind Berntsen
3	Uun Santosa	2 – 0 (15–9, 15–5)	Erik Lia
4	Alex Meijer; Pierre Pelupessy	2 – 0 (15–7, 15–2)	Erik Lia; Thore Næss
5	Uun Santosa; Bas von Barnau Sijthoff	1 – 2 (15–4, 12–15, 10–15)	Øyvind Berntsen; Hans Sperre Jr.

West Germany
4
Sporthallen Zuid
24 February 1988

Ireland
1

		Result
1	Harald Klauer	2 – 0	Michael Watt
2	Guido Schänzler	2 – 0	Liam McKenna
3	Michael Keck	2 – 1	Eugene McKenna
4	Stephan Kuhl; Uwe Scherpen	1 – 2	Eugene McKenna; Michael Watt
5	Volker Eiber; Ralf Rausch	2 – 0	Peter Ferguson; Rikki Keag

West Germany
2
Sporthallen Zuid
24 February 1988

Norway
3

		Result
1	Harald Klauer	1 – 2 (18–14, 8–15, 10–15)	Hans Sperre Jr.
2	Guido Schänzler	2 – 0 (18–17, 15–1)	Øyvind Berntsen
3	Stephan Kuhl	0 – 2 (3–15, 5–15)	Erik Lia
4	Stefan Frey; Harald Klauer	2 – 0 (15–6, 15–0)	Erik Lia; Thore Næss
5	Volker Eiber; Ralf Rausch	0 – 2 (16–17, 5–15)	Øyvind Berntsen; Hans Sperre Jr.

Netherlands
5
Sporthallen Zuid
24 February 1988

Mozambique
0

		Result
1	Lex Coene	2 – 0 (15–3, 15–3)	Luís Antonio Timm
2	Alex Meijer	2 – 1 (15–2, 15–1)	Sozinho Guerra
3	Rob Stalenhoef	2 – 0 (15–1, 15–2)	Arnaldo Bongo
4	Uun Santosa; Bas von Barnau Sijthoff	2 – 0 (15–1, 15–6)	Sozinho Guerra; Luís Antonio Timm
5	Rob Stalenhoef; Randy Trieling	2 – 0 (15–0, 15–2)	Arnaldo Bongo; Serpa Pinto Horacio

Ireland
1
Sporthallen Zuid
25 February 1988

Norway
4

		Result
1	Michael Watt	0 – 2 (3–15, 10–15)	Hans Sperre Jr.
2	Liam McKenna	0 – 2 (11–15, 9–15)	Øyvind Berntsen
3	Eugene McKenna	0 – 2 (2–15, 9–15)	Erik Lia
4	Peter Ferguson; Rikki Keag	2 – 0 (15–6, 15–7)	Erik Lia; Thore Næss
5	Eugene McKenna; Michael Watt	0 – 2 (10–15, 5–15)	Øyvind Berntsen; Hans Sperre Jr.

West Germany
5
Sporthallen Zuid
25 February 1988

Mozambique
0

		Result
1	Guido Schänzler	2 – 0	Luís Antonio Timm
2	Stephan Kuhl	2 – 0	Sozinho Guerra
3	Michael Keck	2 – 0	Arnaldo Bongo
4	Stefan Frey; Guido Schänzler	2 – 0	Sozinho Guerra; Luís Antonio Timm
5	Volker Eiber; Ralf Rausch	2 – 0	Arnaldo Bongo; Serpa Pinto Horacio

Netherlands
5
Sporthallen Zuid
25 February 1988

Ireland
0

		Result
1	Pierre Pelupessy	2 – 0 (15–4, 15–6)	Michael Watt
2	Lex Coene	2 – 0 (15–2, 15–5)	Liam McKenna
3	Uun Santosa	2 – 0 (15–3, 15–2)	Eugene McKenna
4	Alex Meijer; Pierre Pelupessy	2 – 1 (12–15, 15–7, 15–6)	Peter Ferguson; Rikki Keag
5	Uun Santosa; Bas von Barnau Sijthoff	2 – 0 (15–10, 15–6)	Eugene McKenna; Michael Watt

Norway
5
Sporthallen Zuid
26 February 1988

Mozambique
0

		Result
1	Hans Sperre Jr.	2 – 0	Luís Antonio Timm
2	Øyvind Berntsen	2 – 0	Sozinho Guerra
3	Erik Lia	2 – 0	Arnaldo Bongo
4	Erik Lia; Thore Næss	2 – 0	Sozinho Guerra; Luís Antonio Timm
5	Øyvind Berntsen; Hans Sperre Jr.	2 – 0	Arnaldo Bongo; Serpa Pinto Horacio

Netherlands
4
Sporthallen Zuid
27 February 1988

West Germany
1

		Result
1	Pierre Pelupessy	2 – 0 (15–10, 15–12)	Uwe Scherpen
2	Lex Coene	2 – 0 (18–15, 15–8)	Guido Schänzler
3	Uun Santosa	2 – 0 (15–12, 15–2)	Michael Keck
4	Alex Meijer; Pierre Pelupessy	2 – 1 (17–14, 12–15, 15–11)	Stefan Frey; Guido Schänzler
5	Uun Santosa; Bas von Barnau Sijthoff	0 – 2 (7–15, 8–15)	Volker Eiber; Ralf Rausch

Ireland
5
Sporthallen Zuid
27 February 1988

Mozambique
0

		Result
1	Michael Watt	2 – 0	Luís Antonio Timm
2	Liam McKenna	2 – 0	Sozinho Guerra
3	Eugene McKenna	2 – 0	Arnaldo Bongo
4	Peter Ferguson; Rikki Keag	2 – 0	Sozinho Guerra; Luís Antonio Timm
5	Eugene McKenna; Michael Watt	2 – 0	Arnaldo Bongo; Serpa Pinto Horacio

==== Group D ====
Pos	Team	Pld	W	L	MF	MA	MD	Pts	Qualification
1	England	3	3	0	14	1	+13	3	Advance to knockout stage
2	Scotland	3	2	1	11	4	+7	2	
3	Switzerland	3	1	2	3	12	−9	1	
4	France	3	0	3	2	13	−11	0	

Source: The Straits Times

Scotland
5
Sporthallen Zuid
24 February 1988

France
0

		Result
1	Alex White	2 – 0 (15–7, 15–6)	Benoît Pitte
2	Anthony Gallagher	2 – 0 (15–8, 15–3)	Christophe Jeanjean
3	Kenny Middlemiss	2 – 0 (15–4, 15–5)	Cyril Vuillemin
4	Iain Pringle; Alex White	2 – 0 (15–5, 15–2)	Christophe Jeanjean; Benoît Pitte
5	Ross Gladwin; Dan Travers	2 – 0 (15–3, 15–8)	Franck Panel; Stéphane Renault

England
5
Sporthallen Zuid
24 February 1988

Switzerland
0

		Result
1	Steve Baddeley	2 – 0	Thomas Althaus
2	Steve Butler	2 – 0	Pascal Kaul
3	Matthew Smith	2 – 1	Hubert Müller
4	Mike Brown; Richard Outterside	2 – 0	Stephan Dietrich; Hubert Müller
5	Andy Goode; Dave Wright	2 – 0	Pascal Kaul; Yvan Philip

Scotland
5
Sporthallen Zuid
25 February 1988

Switzerland
0

		Result
1	Alex White	2 – 0 (15–11, 15–5)	Thomas Althaus
2	Kenny Middlemiss	2 – 0 (15–4, 15–10)	Pascal Kaul
3	Ross Gladwin	2 – 1 (15–9, 11–15, 15–7)	Hubert Müller
4	Iain Pringle; Alex White	2 – 0 (15–1, 15–5)	Stephan Dietrich; Hubert Müller
5	Ross Gladwin; Dan Travers	2 – 0 (15–4, 15–0)	Pascal Kaul; Yvan Philip

England
5
Sporthallen Zuid
25 February 1988

France
0

		Result
1	Steve Baddeley	2 – 0 (15–11, 15–7)	Franck Panel
2	Steve Butler	2 – 0 (15–6, 15–1)	Stéphane Renault
3	Nick Yates	2 – 0 (15–1, 15–4)	Cyril Vuillemin
4	Martin Dew; Andy Goode	2 – 0 (15–8, 15–4)	Christophe Jeanjean; Benoît Pitte
5	Mike Brown; Darren Hall	2 – 0 (15–5, 15–3)	Franck Panel; Stéphane Renault

England
4
Sporthallen Zuid
26 February 1988

Scotland
1

		Result
1	Darren Hall	2 – 0 (15–3, 15–7)	Alex White
2	Steve Butler	2 – 0 (17–14, 15–0)	Kenny Middlemiss
3	Nick Yates	2 – 0 (15–10, 15–4)	Dan Travers
4	Martin Dew; Andy Goode	2 – 0 (15–7, 15–10)	Iain Pringle; Alex White
5	David Brown; Steve Baddeley	2 – 0 (15–10, 11–15, 12–15)	Ross Gladwin; Dan Travers

Switzerland
3
Sporthallen Zuid
26 February 1988

France
2

		Result
1	Thomas Althaus	1 – 2	Benoît Pitte
2	Pascal Kaul	2 – 1	Christophe Jeanjean
3	Hubert Müller	2 – 0	Cyril Vuillemin
4	Stephan Dietrich; Hubert Müller	1 – 2	Christophe Jeanjean; Benoît Pitte
5	Pascal Kaul; Yvan Philip	2 – 1	Franck Panel; Stéphane Renault

=== Knockout stage ===
Semi-finals
Denmark	5
Sweden	0
Netherlands	0
England	5

Final
Denmark	5
England	0
Third place
Sweden	3
Netherlands	2

==== Semi-finals ====
Denmark
5
Sporthallen Zuid
27 February 1988

Sweden
0

		Result
1	Morten Frost	2 – 0 (15–4, 15–4)	Ulf Johansson
2	Jens Peter Nierhoff	2 – 0 (15–8, 15–11)	Jonas Herrgårdh
3	Ib Frederiksen	2 – 0 (15–10, 15–11)	Jens Olsson
4	Steen Fladberg; Jan Paulsen	2 – 1 (17–18, 15–8, 15–6)	Jan-Eric Antonsson; Pär-Gunnar Jönsson
5	Mark Christiansen; Michael Kjeldsen	2 – 0 (15–13, 17–14)	Peter Axelsson; Stefan Karlsson

England
5
Sporthallen Zuid
27 February 1988

Netherlands
0

		Result
1	Darren Hall	2 – 0 (15–4, 15–7)	Lex Coene
2	Steve Butler	2 – 0 (15–11, 15–1)	Rob Stalenhoef
3	Nick Yates	2 – 0 (15–1, 15–2)	Randy Trieling
4	Martin Dew; Andy Goode	2 – 1 (16–18, 15–9, 15–5)	Uun Santosa; Randy Trieling
5	Mike Brown; Richard Outterside	2 – 0 (15–6, 15–5)	Rob Stalenhoef; Bas von Barnau Sijthoff

==== Third place ====
Sweden
3
Sporthallen Zuid
28 February 1988

Netherlands
2

		Result
1	Ulf Johansson	1 – 2 (15–3, 5–15, 10–15)	Pierre Pelupessy
2	Jonas Herrgårdh	0 – 2 (5–15, 10–15)	Lex Coene
3	Jens Olsson	2 – 0 (18–14, 15–6)	Uun Santosa
4	Jan-Eric Antonsson; Pär-Gunnar Jönsson	2 – 0 (15–8, 15–13)	Alex Meijer; Pierre Pelupessy
5	Peter Axelsson; Stefan Karlsson	2 – 0 (15–8, 15–2)	Uun Santosa; Randy Trieling

==== Final ====
Denmark
5
Sporthallen Zuid
28 February 1988

England
0

		Result
1	Morten Frost	2 – 0 (15–0, 15–2)	Steve Baddeley
2	Michael Kjeldsen	2 – 0 (15–12, 15–7)	Darren Hall
3	Ib Frederiksen	2 – 1 (12–15, 15–7, 15–12)	Steve Butler
4	Michael Kjeldsen; Jens Peter Nierhoff	2 – 1 (5–15, 15–8, 15–13)	Martin Dew; Andy Goode
5	Steen Fladberg; Jan Paulsen	2 – 0 (15–10, 15–10)	Mike Brown; Richard Outterside

== Oceania Zone ==
The qualification rounds for the Oceania Zone were held from 26 to 28 February at the Altona Hall in Melbourne, Australia. Four teams took part in qualifying for the final tournament.

=== Round robin ===
Pos	Team	Pld	W	L	MF	MA	MD	Pts	Qualification
1	Indonesia	3	3	0	15	0	+15	3	Final tournament
2	Australia	3	2	1	7	8	−1	2	
3	Singapore	3	1	2	4	11	−7	1	
4	New Zealand	3	0	3	4	11	−7	0	

Source: The Straits Times

Indonesia
5
Altona Hall
26 February 1988

Singapore
0

		Result
1	Eddy Kurniawan	2 – 0 (15–8, 15–5)	Abdul Hamid Khan
2	Lius Pongoh	2 – 1 (7–15, 15–8, 15–2)	Lau Wing Cheok
3	Alan Budikusuma	2 – 0 (15–4, 15–1)	Benson Wong
4	Bobby Ertanto; Hendry Gunawan	2 – 1 (15–13, 13–15, 15–11)	Abdul Hamid Khan; Lau Wing Cheok
5	Icuk Sugiarto; Hadibowo Susanto	2 – 0 (15–0, 15–4)	Chong Soon Onn; Wong Kong Kay

New Zealand
2
Altona Hall
26 February 1988

Australia
3

		Result
1	Kerrin Harrison	0 – 2 (4–15, 5–15)	Sze Yu
2	Graeme Robson	2 – 0 (15–5, 17–14)	Darren McDonald
3	Kevin Ross	2 – 1 (11–15, 15–8, 15–10)	Michael Scandolera
4	Kerrin Harrison; Graeme Robson	1 – 2 (15–1, 15–17, 6–15)	Gordon Lang; Michael Scandolera
5	Kevin Ross; Jeff Sowter	1 – 2 (11–15, 15–11, 7–15)	Darren McDonald; Peter Roberts

Singapore
1
Altona Hall
27 February 1988

Australia
4

		Result
1	Abdul Hamid Khan	0 – 2 (2–15, 5–15)	Sze Yu
2	Lau Wing Cheok	2 – 1 (17–18, 15–1, 15–3)	Darren McDonald
3	Chong Soon Onn	1 – 2 (5–15, 15–13, 6–15)	Michael Scandolera
4	Sulaiman Zaini; Wong Kong Kay	0 – 2 (5–15, 9–15)	Darren McDonald; Peter Roberts
5	Abdul Hamid Khan; Lau Wing Cheok	0 – 2 (15–18, 10–15)	Gordon Lang; Michael Scandolera

Indonesia
5
Altona Hall
27 February 1988

New Zealand
0

		Result
1	Icuk Sugiarto	2 – 0 (15–9, 15–4)	Kerrin Harrison
2	Eddy Kurniawan	2 – 0 (15–1, 15–6)	Graeme Robson
3	Ardy Wiranata	2 – 0 (15–1, 15–9)	Kevin Ross
4	Bobby Ertanto; Hendry Gunawan	2 – 0 (15–9, 15–5)	Kerrin Harrison; Graeme Robson
5	Eddy Hartono; Hadibowo Susanto	2 – 0 (15–4, 15–7)	Kevin Ross; Jeff Sowter

Singapore
3
Altona Hall
28 February 1988

New Zealand
2

		Result
1	Abdul Hamid Khan	2 – 0 (15–9, 15–6)	Kerrin Harrison
2	Lau Wing Cheok	2 – 0 (15–3, 15–7)	Graeme Robson
3	Benson Wong	0 – 2 (7–15, 2–15)	Kevin Ross
4	Abdul Hamid Khan; Lau Wing Cheok	0 – 2 (15–10, 15–9)	Kerrin Harrison; Graeme Robson
5	Chong Soon Onn; Wong Kong Kay	0 – 2 (13–18, 12–15)	Gordon Lang; Adrian Welch

Indonesia
5
Altona Hall
28 February 1988

Australia
0

		Result
1	Eddy Kurniawan	2 – 0 (15–11, 15–11)	Darren McDonald
2	Alan Budikusuma	2 – 0 (15–8, 15–2)	Gordon Lang
3	Ardy Wiranata	2 – 0 (15–3, 15–1)	Paul Stevenson
4	Bobby Ertanto; Hendry Gunawan	2 – 1 (15–12, 12–15, 15–11)	Gordon Lang; Michael Scandolera
5	Eddy Hartono; Hadibowo Susanto	2 – 0 (15–10, 15–5)	Darren McDonald; Peter Roberts

== Pan American Zone ==
The qualifying rounds for the Pan American zone were held at the San Jose Convention and Cultural Center in San Jose, United States. Eight teams competed in qualifying for the final tournament. Mexico withdrew from the tournament.

=== Group stage ===
==== Group A ====
Pos	Team	Pld	W	L	MF	MA	MD	Pts	Qualification
1	South Korea	3	3	0	15	0	+15	3	Advance to knockout stage
2	Chinese Taipei	3	2	1	8	7	+1	2	
3	Pakistan	3	1	2	3	12	−9	1	
4	Peru	3	0	3	2	14	−12	0	
5	Mexico	0	0	0	0	0	0	0	Withdrew

Source: The Straits Times

South Korea
5
San Jose Convention and Cultural Center
26 February 1988

Pakistan
0

		Result
1	Park Sung-bae	2 – 0 (15–9, 15–3)	Nadeem Ur Rahman
2	Sung Han-kook	2 – 0 (15–3, 15–5)	Sher Afghan
3	Park Joo-bong	2 – 0 (15–10, 15–3)	Mirza Ali Yar Beg
4	Kim Moon-soo; Park Joo-bong	2 – 0 (15–0, 15–0)	Zahid Maqbool; Nadeem Ur Rahman
5	Lee Sang-bok; Sung Han-kook	2 – 0 (15–3, 15–0)	Sher Afghan; Mirza Ali Yar Beg

Chinese Taipei
3
San Jose Convention and Cultural Center
26 February 1988

Peru
2

		Result
1	Chang Wen-sung	1 – 2	Gustavo Salazar
2	Chen Neng-piao	2 – 0	Christian Schroder
3	Chung Chia-jen	2 – 0	Federico Valdez
4	Ger Shin-ming; Liao Wei-che	1 – 2	Gustavo Salazar; Federico Valdez
5	Lee Jen-yuan; Yang Shih-jeng	2 – 0	Alvaro García; José Iturriaga

South Korea
5
San Jose Convention and Cultural Center
26 February 1988

Peru
0

		Result
1	Park Sung-bae	2 – 1 (11–15, 15–3, 15–3)	Gustavo Salazar
2	Sung Han-kook	2 – 0 (15–0, 15–0)	Christian Schroder
3	Lee Sang-bok	2 – 0 (15–12, 15–5)	José Iturriaga
4	Kim Moon-soo; Park Joo-bong	2 – 0 (15–0, 15–0)	Gustavo Salazar; Federico Valdez
5	Lee Sang-bok; Park Sung-bae	2 – 0 (15–0, 15–1)	Alvaro García; José Iturriaga

Chinese Taipei
5
San Jose Convention and Cultural Center
26 February 1988

Pakistan
0

		Result
1	Chang Wen-sung	2 – 1	Nadeem Ur Rahman
2	Chen Neng-piao	2 – 0	Sher Afghan
3	Chung Chia-jen	2 – 0	Mirza Ali Yar Beg
4	Ger Shin-ming; Liao Wei-che	2 – 1	Zahid Maqbool; Nadeem Ur Rahman
5	Lee Jen-yuan; Yang Shih-jeng	2 – 0	Sher Afghan; Mirza Ali Yar Beg

South Korea
5
San Jose Convention and Cultural Center
27 February 1988

Chinese Taipei
0

		Result
1	Park Sung-bae	2 – 0 (15–5, 15–8)	Chang Wen-sung
2	Sung Han-kook	2 – 0 (15–0, 15–9)	Chen Neng-piao
3	Lee Sang-bok	2 – 0 (15–9, 15–12)	Chung Chia-jen
4	Kim Moon-soo; Park Joo-bong	2 – 0 (15–6, 15–1)	Ger Shin-ming; Liao Wei-che
5	Lee Deuk-choon; Lee Sang-bok	2 – 0 (15–6, 15–1)	Lee Jen-yuan; Yang Shih-jeng

Peru
2
San Jose Convention and Cultural Center
27 February 1988

Pakistan
3

		Result
1	Gustavo Salazar	2 – 0 (18–13, 15–10)	Nadeem Ur Rahman
2	Christian Schroder	1 – 2 (15–10, 1–15, 5–15)	Sher Afghan
3	Federico Valdez	0 – 2 (5–15, 5–15)	Mirza Ali Yar Beg
4	Gustavo Salazar; Federico Valdez	2 – 0 (15–5, 15–9)	Zahid Maqbool; Nadeem Ur Rahman
5	Alvaro García; José Iturriaga	0 – 2 (15–18, 16–18)	Sher Afghan; Mirza Ali Yar Beg

==== Group B ====
Pos	Team	Pld	W	L	MF	MA	MD	Pts	Qualification
1	United States	3	3	0	12	3	+9	3	Advance to knockout stage
2	Canada	3	2	1	12	3	+9	2	
3	Hong Kong	3	1	2	6	9	−3	1	
4	Guatemala	3	0	3	0	15	−15	0	

Source: The Straits Times

Canada
2
San Jose Convention and Cultural Center
26 February 1988

United States
3

		Result
1	Mike Butler	2 – 1	Yao Ximing
2	Bryan Blanshard	0 – 2	Chris Jogis
3	David Humble	0 – 2	Tariq Wadood
4	Bryan Blanshard; Ian Johnston	2 – 1	Mathew Fogarty; Bruce Pontow
5	Mike Bitten; Mike deBelle	0 – 2	Tariq Wadood; Yao Ximing

Hong Kong
5
San Jose Convention and Cultural Center
26 February 1988

Guatemala
0

		Result
1	Chan Chi Choi	2 – 0 (15–1, 15–1)	Raúl Martínez
2	Yeung Yik Kei	2 – 0 (15–0, 15–1)	Carlos Escobar
3	Tsui Chau Lam	2 – 0 (15–0, 15–1)	Kenneth Erichsen
4	Chan Chi Choi; Lai Hung	2 – 0 (15–3, 15–2)	Carlos Escobar; Raúl Martínez
5	Chan Chi Choi; Yeung Yik Kei	2 – 0 (15–1, 15–6)	Kenneth Erichsen; Danny Ovando

Hong Kong
1
San Jose Convention and Cultural Center
26 February 1988

United States
4

		Result
1	Chan Chi Choi	2 – 0 (15–9, 15–2)	Yao Ximing
2	Yeung Yik Kei	0 – 2 (13–15, 12–15)	Chris Jogis
3	Tsui Chau Lam	0 – 2 (6–15, 3–15)	Tariq Wadood
4	Chan Chi Choi; Chan Siu Kwong	1 – 2 (15–13, 7–15, 16–18)	Mathew Fogarty; Bruce Pontow
5	Lai Hung; Yeung Yik Kei	0 – 2 (6–15, 4–15)	Tariq Wadood; Yao Ximing

Canada
5
San Jose Convention and Cultural Center
26 February 1988

Guatemala
0

		Result
1	Mike Butler	2 – 0 (15–1, 15–2)	Raúl Martínez
2	Bryan Blanshard	2 – 0 (15–1, 15–3)	Danny Ovando
3	David Humble	2 – 0 (15–0, 15–1)	Kenneth Erichsen
4	Bryan Blanshard; Ian Johnston	2 – 0 (15–1, 15–2)	Carlos Escobar; Raúl Martínez
5	Mike Bitten; Mike deBelle	2 – 0 (15–0, 15–1)	Kenneth Erichsen; Danny Ovando

United States
5
San Jose Convention and Cultural Center
27 February 1988

Guatemala
0

		Result
1	Benny Lee	2 – 0 (15–6, 15–5)	Raúl Martínez
2	Sanjay Malde	2 – 0 (15–1, 15–3)	Carlos Escobar
3	John Britton	2 – 0 (15–8, 15–4)	Kenneth Erichsen
4	Chris Jogis; Benny Lee	2 – 0 (15–1, 15–8)	Carlos Escobar; Raúl Martínez
5	John Britton; Jonathan Solaiman	2 – 0 (15–2, 15–3)	Kenneth Erichsen; Danny Ovando

Canada
5
San Jose Convention and Cultural Center
27 February 1988

Hong Kong
0

		Result
1	Mike Butler	2 – 0 (15–7, 15–10)	Yeung Yik Kei
2	Bryan Blanshard	2 – 0 (15–8, 18–13)	Tsui Chau Lam
3	David Humble	2 – 0 (15–11, 15–6)	Lai Hung
4	Bryan Blanshard; Ian Johnston	2 – 0 (15–8, 15–7)	Chan Chi Choi; Tsui Chau Lam
5	Mike Bitten; Mike deBelle	2 – 0 (15–4, 15–9)	Lai Hung; Yeung Yik Kei

=== Knockout stage ===
Final
South Korea	5
United States	0

==== Final ====
South Korea
5
San Jose Convention and Cultural Center
28 February 1988

United States
0

		Result
1	Park Sung-bae	2 – 0 (15–0, 15–1)	Chris Jogis
2	Sung Han-kook	2 – 0 (15–5, 15–1)	Benny Lee
3	Lee Sang-bok	2 – 1 (8–15, 15–6, 15–8)	Sanjay Malde
4	Kim Moon-soo; Park Joo-bong	2 – 0 (15–0, 15–5)	Chris Jogis; Benny Lee
5	Lee Sang-bok; Park Sung-bae	2 – 1 (9–15, 15–9, 15–7)	Tariq Wadood; Yao Ximing
