= 1989 Pan Am Badminton Championships =

Tournament details
- Dates: 4–10 December
- Nations: 8
- Venue: Gimnasio Olímpico Juan de la Barrera.
- Location: Mexico City, Mexico

Champions
- Men's singles: (Canada) John Goss
- Women's singles: (Canada) Doris Piché
- Men's doubles: (United States) Chris Jogis (United States) Benny Lee
- Women's doubles: (Canada) Chantal Jobin (Canada) Doris Piché
- Mixed doubles: (Canada) Mike Bitten (Canada) Doris Piché

The 1989 Pan Am Badminton Championships (Spanish: Campeonato Panamericano de Bádminton 1989) was the sixth edition of the Pan American Badminton Championships. The tournament was held from 4 to 10 December at the Juan de la Barrera Olimpic Gim. in Mexico City, Mexico. Eight countries competed in the championships.

Six out of the eight competing countries competed in the mixed team event. Uruguay and Guatemala only sent players to compete in the individual events.

Canada dominated the championships with five gold medals, three silver medals and six bronze medals. The United States finished second on the medal table with one gold medal, two silver medals and one bronze medal.

The Peruvian contingent won a silver medal and three bronze medals. Jamaica won their first ever medal at the Pan American Championships when Maria Leyow and Terry Walker clinched bronze in the women's team event. Hosts Mexico finished the championships without a medal.

== Medal summary ==
=== Medalists ===
Event	Gold	Silver	Bronze
Men's singles	(Canada) John Goss	(United States) Chris Jogis	(Canada) Bryan Blanshard
Men's singles	(Canada) John Goss	(United States) Chris Jogis	(Peru) Gustavo Salazar
Women's singles	(Canada) Doris Piché	(Canada) Marie-Helene Loranger	(Canada) Heather Ostrom
Women's singles	(Canada) Doris Piché	(Canada) Marie-Helene Loranger	(Canada) Chantal Jobin
Men's doubles	(United States) Chris Jogis (United States) Benny Lee	(Peru) Gustavo Salazar (Peru) Germán Valdez	(Canada) Mike Bitten (Canada) Bryan Blanshard
Men's doubles	(United States) Chris Jogis (United States) Benny Lee	(Peru) Gustavo Salazar (Peru) Germán Valdez	(Canada) Jaimie Dawson (Canada) John Goss
Women's doubles	(Canada) Chantal Jobin (Canada) Doris Piché	(Canada) Marie-Helene Loranger (Canada) Heather Ostrom	(United States) Linda Safarik-Tong (United States) Erika von Heiland
Women's doubles	(Canada) Chantal Jobin (Canada) Doris Piché	(Canada) Marie-Helene Loranger (Canada) Heather Ostrom	(Jamaica) Maria Leyow (Jamaica) Terry Walker
Mixed doubles	(Canada) Mike Bitten (Canada) Doris Piché	(Canada) John Goss (Canada) Chantal Jobin	(Canada) Jaimie Dawson (Canada) Heather Ostrom
Mixed doubles	(Canada) Mike Bitten (Canada) Doris Piché	(Canada) John Goss (Canada) Chantal Jobin	(Peru) Federico Valdez (Peru) Gloria Jiménez
Mixed team	Canada; John Goss; Bryan Blanshard; Mike Bitten; Jaimie Dawson; Doris Piché; Chantal Jobin; Marie-Helene Loranger; Heather Ostrom	United States; Chris Jogis; Benny Lee; Thomas Carmichael Jr. Karl Knudsen; Ann French; Joy Kitzmiller; Linda Safarik-Tong; Erika von Heiland	Peru; Gustavo Salazar; Federico Valdez; Germán Valdez; Mario Carulla; Ximena Bellido; Gloria Jiménez; Maria Theresa Montero

=== Medal table ===
* Host nation (Mexico)

Rank	Nation	Gold	Silver	Bronze	Total
1	Canada (CAN)	5	3	6	14
2	United States (USA)	1	2	1	4
3	Peru (PER)	0	1	3	4
4	Jamaica (JAM)	0	0	1	1
Totals (4 entries)		6	6	11	23

== Individual results ==
=== Men's singles ===
Quarter-finals
(Canada) John Goss	15	15
(United States) Benny Lee	10	3
(Mexico) Fernando de la Torre	14	7
(Peru) Gustavo Salazar	18	15
(Canada) Bryan Blanshard	15	2	15
(Mexico) Gerardo Cedillo	7	15	13
(Canada) Jaimie Dawson	12	17	8
(United States) Chris Jogis	15	14	15

Semi-finals
(Canada) John Goss	15	15
(Peru) Gustavo Salazar	8	4
(Canada) Bryan Blanshard	15	0^{r}
(United States) Chris Jogis	12	0

Final
(Canada) John Goss	18	15
(United States) Chris Jogis	17	10

=== Women's singles ===
Quarter-finals
(Canada) Doris Piché	11	11
(Trinidad and Tobago) Debra O'Connor	3	2
(Canada) Heather Ostrom	11	11
(United States) Linda French	3	2
(Canada) Chantal Jobin	6	11	11
(United States) Linda Safarik-Tong	11	5	6
(Mexico) María de la Paz Luna	2	8
(Canada) Marie-Helene Loranger	11	11

Semi-finals
(Canada) Doris Piché	11	11
(Canada) Heather Ostrom	3	3
(Canada) Chantal Jobin	0	6
(Canada) Marie-Helene Loranger	11	11

Final
(Canada) Doris Piché	11	5	11
(Canada) Marie-Helene Loranger	5	11	5

=== Men's doubles ===
Quarter-finals
(Canada) Mike Bitten (Canada) Bryan Blanshard	15	15
(Peru) Mario Carulla (Peru) Federico Valdez	12	7
(Peru) Gustavo Salazar (Peru) Germán Valdez	15	11	15
(Jamaica) Robert Richards (Jamaica) Paul Leyow	6	15	9
(Canada) John Goss (Canada) Jaimie Dawson	15	18
(Mexico) Fernando de la Torre (Mexico) Bernardo Monreal	8	16
(Guatemala) Kenneth Erichsen (Guatemala) Renato Rosales	0	9
(United States) Chris Jogis (United States) Benny Lee	15	15

Semi-finals
(Canada) Mike Bitten (Canada) Bryan Blanshard
(Peru) Gustavo Salazar (Peru) Germán Valdez	w	/	o
(Canada) John Goss (Canada) Jaimie Dawson	9	8
(United States) Chris Jogis (United States) Benny Lee	15	15

Final
(Peru) Gustavo Salazar (Peru) Germán Valdez	7	8
(United States) Chris Jogis (United States) Benny Lee	15	15

=== Women's doubles ===
Quarter-finals
(Canada) Chantal Jobin (Canada) Doris Piché	15	15
(Trinidad and Tobago) Virginia Chariandy (Trinidad and Tobago) Debra O'Connor	5	5
(United States) Linda Safarik-Tong (United States) Erika von Heiland	15	15
(Mexico) Claudia Cruz (Mexico) Norma Hernandez	1	7
(Canada) Marie-Helene Loranger (Canada) Heather Ostrom	15	15
(Jamaica) Deborah Binns (Peru) Maria Theresa Montero	11	1
(Jamaica) Maria Leyow (Jamaica) Terry Walker	15	15
(Peru) Ximena Bellido (Peru) Gloria Jiménez	10	11

Semi-finals
(Canada) Chantal Jobin (Canada) Doris Piché	15	15
(United States) Linda Safarik-Tong (United States) Erika von Heiland	7	4
(Canada) Marie-Helene Loranger (Canada) Heather Ostrom	15	15
(Jamaica) Maria Leyow (Jamaica) Terry Walker	11	1

Final
(Canada) Chantal Jobin (Canada) Doris Piché	15	15
(Canada) Marie-Helene Loranger (Canada) Heather Ostrom	4	8

=== Mixed doubles ===
Quarter-finals
(Canada) Mike Bitten (Canada) Doris Piché	15	15
(United States) Karl Knudsen (United States) Joy Kitzmiller	7	6
(Peru) Federico Valdez (Peru) Gloria Jiménez	16	18	15
(Jamaica) Robert Richards (Jamaica) Maria Leyow	17	13	1
(Canada) John Goss (Canada) Chantal Jobin	15	15
(Mexico) Fernando de la Torre (Mexico) María de la Paz Luna	3	3
(United States) Benny Lee (United States) Ann French	5	11
(Canada) Jaimie Dawson (Canada) Heather Ostrom	15	15

Semi-finals
(Canada) Mike Bitten (Canada) Doris Piché	15	15
(Peru) Federico Valdez (Peru) Gloria Jiménez	8	7
(Canada) John Goss (Canada) Chantal Jobin	15	15
(Canada) Jaimie Dawson (Canada) Heather Ostrom	2	8

Final
(Canada) Mike Bitten (Canada) Doris Piché	15	8	15
(Canada) John Goss (Canada) Chantal Jobin	9	15	3

== Team event ==
=== Group stage ===
==== Group A ====
Team	Pld	W	L	MF	MA	MD	Pts
Canada	2	2	0	10	0	+10	2
Jamaica	2	1	1	4	6	−2	1
Mexico	2	0	2	1	9	−8	0

Canada	5–0	Jamaica
Canada	5–0	Mexico
Jamaica	4–1	Mexico

==== Group B ====
Team	Pld	W	L	MF	MA	MD	Pts
United States	2	2	0	8	2	+6	2
Peru	2	1	1	5	5	0	1
Trinidad and Tobago	2	0	2	1	9	−8	0

United States	4–1	Peru
United States	4–1	Trinidad and Tobago
Peru	4–1	Trinidad and Tobago

=== Knockout stage ===
Canada won the mixed team final by defeating the United States 4–1. In the match for third place, Peru defeated Jamaica 3–2.

Semi-finals
Canada	5
Peru	0
Jamaica	0
United States	5

Final
Canada	4
United States	1
Third place
Peru	3
Jamaica	2
