= Benny Lee (badminton) =

American badminton player (born 1965)

Personal information
- Born: December 5, 1965 (age 60) Rangoon, Burma
- Height: 1.68 m (5 ft 6 in)

Sport
- Country: United States
- Sport: Badminton
- Handedness: Right
Medal record
Men's badminton
Representing United States
Pan Am Championships
Gold medal – first place	1989 Mexico City	Men's doubles
Silver medal – second place	1991 Kingston	Men's doubles
Bronze medal – third place	1987 Lima	Men's doubles
Pan Am Mixed Team Championships
Silver medal – second place	1989 Mexico City	Mixed team
Silver medal – second place	1991 Kingston	Mixed team
Bronze medal – third place	1987 Lima	Mixed team

Benny Lee (born December 5, 1965) is an American former badminton player and coach. He competed in two events at the 1992 Summer Olympics. Lee is a 9-time national champion in men's doubles. He won the national championships four times with Chris Jogis, four times with Thomas Reidy and won his ninth title with Andy Chong in 1998.

In 2012, Lee founded the Synergy Badminton Academy in California.

== Career ==
Partnered with Chris Jogis, the two went on to win the men's doubles title at the 1989 Pan Am Badminton Championships in Mexico. In 1991, he partnered with Thomas Reidy and reached his second men's doubles final at the Pan American championships before losing to Mike Bitten and Bryan Blanshard of Canada.

== Personal life ==
Lee is the father of Allison Lee, who is also a badminton player and a runner-up at the 2023 BWF World Junior Championships.

== Achievements ==
=== Pan Am Championships ===
Men's doubles

Year	Venue	Partner	Opponent	Score	Result
1987	Club de Regatas Lima, Lima, Peru	(United States) Chris Jogis	(Canada) Mike Butler (Canada) Anil Kaul	9–15, 13–18	Bronze
1989	Centro Deportivo Chapultepec A.C., Mexico City, Mexico	(United States) Chris Jogis	(Peru) Gustavo Salazar (Peru) Federico Valdez	15–7, 15–8	Gold
1991	Convention Hall, Kingston, Jamaica	(United States) Thomas Reidy	(Canada) Mike Bitten (Canada) Bryan Blanshard	12–15, 5–15	Silver
