= 1979 Pan Am Badminton Championships =

Tournament details
- Dates: 18 April 1979 – 22 April 1979
- Nations: 4
- Venue: Centro Deportivo Chapultepec A.C.
- Location: Mexico City, Mexico

Champions
- Men's singles: (Mexico) Ricardo Jaramillo
- Women's singles: (Canada) Johanne Falardeau
- Men's doubles: (Canada) Jamie McKee (Canada) Pat Tryon
- Women's doubles: (Canada) Claire Backhouse (Canada) Johanne Falardeau
- Mixed doubles: (Canada) Paul Johnson (Canada) Claire Backhouse

The 1979 Pan Am Badminton Championships (Spanish: Campeonato Panamericano de Bádminton 1979) was the third edition of the Pan American Badminton Championships. The tournament was held from 18 to 22 April 1979 in Mexico City, Mexico.

Canada finished top on the medal table. Hosts Mexico finished second on the medal table with a gold in men's singles, which was won by Ricardo Jaramillo. Johanne Falardeau of Canada retained her title as the Pan American women's singles champion.

== Medal summary ==
=== Medalists ===
Event	Gold	Silver	Bronze
Men's singles	(Mexico) Ricardo Jaramillo	(Canada) Jamie McKee	(United States) Gary Higgins
Men's singles	(Mexico) Ricardo Jaramillo	(Canada) Jamie McKee	(Canada) Paul Johnson
Women's singles	(Canada) Johanne Falardeau	(Canada) Jane Youngberg	(Canada) Denyse Julien
Women's singles	(Canada) Johanne Falardeau	(Canada) Jane Youngberg	(United States) Mary Thelf
Men's doubles	(Canada) Jamie McKee (Canada) Pat Tryon	(United States) Bob Gilmore (United States) Mike Walker	(Canada) David deBelle (Canada) Paul Johnson
Men's doubles	(Canada) Jamie McKee (Canada) Pat Tryon	(United States) Bob Gilmore (United States) Mike Walker	(United States) John Britton (United States) Gary Higgins
Women's doubles	(Canada) Claire Backhouse (Canada) Johanne Falardeau	(United States) Cheryl Carton (United States) Vicky Toutz	(United States) Monica Narcowicz (United States) Mary Thelf
Women's doubles	(Canada) Claire Backhouse (Canada) Johanne Falardeau	(United States) Cheryl Carton (United States) Vicky Toutz	(Canada) Denyse Julien (Canada) Sandra Skillings
Mixed doubles	(Canada) Paul Johnson (Canada) Claire Backhouse	(Canada) Jamie McKee (Canada) Johanne Falardeau	(United States) Mike Walker (United States) Monica Narcowicz
Mixed doubles	(Canada) Paul Johnson (Canada) Claire Backhouse	(Canada) Jamie McKee (Canada) Johanne Falardeau	(United States) John Britton (United States) Cheryl Carton
Mixed team (Devlin Cup)	Canada	United States	Not awarded

=== Medal table ===
* Host nation (Mexico)

Rank	Nation	Gold	Silver	Bronze	Total
1	Canada (CAN)	5	3	4	12
2	Mexico (MEX)*	1	0	0	1
3	United States (USA)	0	3	6	9
Totals (3 entries)		6	6	10	22

== Mixed team ==
The mixed team event, also known as the Devlin Cup, was held from 18 to 19 April 1979. Three countries competed in the event. In the semi-finals, the United States beat hosts Mexico 5–0. In the final, Canada defeated the United States 4–1 to win the title.

=== Knockout stage ===
Semi-finals
United States	5
Mexico	0
Bye
Canada

Final
United States	1
Canada	4

=== Final ===
Canada
4
Centro Deportivo Chapultepec A.C.
19 April 1979

United States
1

			1	2	3
1	(Canada) (United States)	Jamie McKee; Gary Higgins	15; 1	15; 5
2	(Canada) (United States)	Johanne Falardeau; Mary Thelf	11; 8	11; 1
3	(Canada) (United States)	David deBelle / Paul Johnson; John Britton / Gary Higgins	18; 15	11; 15	9; 15
4	(Canada) (United States)	Claire Backhouse / Johanne Falardeau; Monica Narcowicz / Mary Thelf	15; 8	15; 12
5	(Canada) (United States)	Paul Johnson / Claire Backhouse; Mike Walker / Monica Narcowicz	15; 9	15; 13
