= 1977 Pan Am Badminton Championships =

Tournament details
- Dates: 22 April 1977 – 24 April 1977
- Nations: 6
- Venue: Université de Moncton
- Location: Moncton, Canada

Champions
- Men's singles: (Mexico) Roy Díaz González
- Women's singles: (Canada) Wendy Clarkson
- Men's doubles: (Canada) John Czich (Canada) Jamie McKee
- Women's doubles: (United States) Pam Bristol Brady (United States) Judianne Kelly
- Mixed doubles: (United States) Bruce Pontow (United States) Pam Bristol Brady

The 1977 Pan Am Badminton Championships was the inaugural edition of the Pan American Badminton Championships. The tournament was held from 22 to 24 April 1977 at the University of Moncton in Moncton, Canada. The first six countries to compete in the Pan American Championships were the United States, Canada, Guatemala, Jamaica, Mexico and Venezuela.

The 1977 Devlin Cup was also held a day prior the championships and acted as a team event for the Pan American championships.

== Results summary ==
In the men's singles event, Roy Díaz González won the gold medal after defeating Jamie McKee in the final. In the women's singles final, Wendy Clarkson defeated compatriot Lesley Harris to win gold in the women's singles event.

In the men's doubles event, Jamie McKee won another gold medal when he partnered with John Czich to defeat compatriots Ian Johnson and Pat Tryon in the final. In the final of the women's doubles event, Pam Bristol Brady and Judianne Kelly of the United States defeated fellow Americans Diana Osterhues and Janet Wilts 15–4, 15–9.

In mixed doubles, the gold medal was won by Bruce Pontow and Pam Bristol Brady with the silver medal awarded to Chris Kinard and Mike Walker.

== Medal summary ==
=== Medalists ===
Event	Gold	Silver	Bronze
Men's singles	(Mexico) Roy Díaz González	(Canada) Jamie McKee	(United States) Chris Kinard
Men's singles	(Mexico) Roy Díaz González	(Canada) Jamie McKee	(United States) Charles Coakley
Women's singles	(Canada) Wendy Clarkson	(Canada) Lesley Harris	(United States) Judianne Kelly
Women's singles	(Canada) Wendy Clarkson	(Canada) Lesley Harris	(Canada) Tracy van Wassenhove
Men's doubles	(Canada) John Czich (Canada) Jamie McKee	(Canada) Ian Johnson (Canada) Pat Tryon	(Canada) Greg Carter (Canada) John Taylor
Men's doubles	(Canada) John Czich (Canada) Jamie McKee	(Canada) Ian Johnson (Canada) Pat Tryon	(United States) Chris Kinard (United States) Mike Walker
Women's doubles	(United States) Pam Bristol Brady (United States) Judianne Kelly	(United States) Diana Osterhues (United States) Janet Wilts	(Canada) Wendy Clarkson (Canada) Tracy van Wassenhove
Women's doubles	(United States) Pam Bristol Brady (United States) Judianne Kelly	(United States) Diana Osterhues (United States) Janet Wilts	(Canada) Sharon Crawford (Canada) Lesley Harris
Mixed doubles	(United States) Bruce Pontow (United States) Pam Bristol Brady	(United States) Mike Walker (United States) Judianne Kelly	(Canada) Greg Carter (Canada) Wendy Clarkson
Mixed doubles	(United States) Bruce Pontow (United States) Pam Bristol Brady	(United States) Mike Walker (United States) Judianne Kelly	(United States) Charles Coakley (United States) Janet Wilts
Mixed team (Devlin Cup)	Canada; Jamie McKee; Sally Dalkin; Wendy Clarkson; Sharon Crawford; Tracy van Wassenhove; Greg Carter; Pat Tryon; Lesley Harris; Ian Johnson; John Czich; John Taylor	United States; Charles Coakley; Chris Kinard; Bruce Pontow; Mike Walker; Pam Bristol Brady; Judianne Kelly; Diana Osterhues; Janet Wilts	Not awarded

=== Medal table ===
* Host nation (Canada)

Rank	Nation	Gold	Silver	Bronze	Total
1	Canada (CAN)*	3	3	5	11
2	United States (USA)	2	3	5	10
3	Mexico (MEX)	1	0	0	1
Totals (3 entries)		6	6	10	22

== Results ==
=== Men's singles ===
Quarter-finals
(Mexico) Roy Díaz González	9	15	15
(United States) Mike Walker	15	2	8
(United States) Charles Coakley	17	15
(Canada) John Czich	15	10
(United States) Chris Kinard	15	15
(Mexico) José Icaza	1	1
(Canada) Ian Johnson	14	5
(Canada) Jamie McKee	15	15

Semi-finals
(Mexico) Roy Díaz González	15	15
(United States) Charles Coakley	7	3
(United States) Chris Kinard	7	13
(Canada) Jamie McKee	15	15

Final
(Mexico) Roy Díaz González	17	11	15
(Canada) Jamie McKee	14	15	9

=== Women's singles ===
Quarter-finals
(Canada) Wendy Clarkson	11	11
(United States) Diana Osterhues	0	3
(United States) Judianne Kelly	11	11
(Canada) Janette Martin	3	1
(United States) Sally Dalkin	7	11	6
(Canada) Tracy van Wassenhove	11	3	11
(Canada) Janet Wilts	2	2
(Canada) Lesley Harris	11	11

Semi-finals
(Canada) Wendy Clarkson	11	11
(United States) Judianne Kelly	7	2
(Canada) Tracy van Wassenhove	4	4
(Canada) Lesley Harris	15	15

Final
(Canada) Wendy Clarkson	11	11
(Canada) Lesley Harris	5	1

=== Men's doubles ===
Semi-finals
(Canada) John Czich (Canada) Jamie McKee	15	15
(Canada) Greg Carter (Canada) John Taylor	5	12
(United States) Chris Kinard (United States) Mike Walker	12	7
(Canada) Ian Johnson (Canada) Pat Tryon	15	15

Final
(Canada) John Czich (Canada) Jamie McKee	15	18
(Canada) Ian Johnson (Canada) Pat Tryon	8	15

=== Women's doubles ===
Semi-finals
(United States) Diana Osterhues (United States) Janet Wilts	15	17
(Canada) Wendy Clarkson (Canada) Tracy van Wassenhove	5	14
(Canada) Sharon Crawford (Canada) Lesley Harris	4	15	5
(United States) Pam Bristol Brady (United States) Judianne Kelly	15	7	15

Final
(United States) Diana Osterhues (United States) Janet Wilts	4	9
(United States) Pam Bristol Brady (United States) Judianne Kelly	15	15

=== Mixed doubles ===
Semi-finals
(United States) Mike Walker (United States) Judianne Kelly	7	18	15
(Canada) Wendy Clarkson (Canada) Tracy van Wassenhove	15	17	9
(United States) Charles Coakley (United States) Janet Wilts	6	15
(United States) Bruce Pontow (United States) Pam Bristol Brady	15	18

Final
(United States) Mike Walker (United States) Judianne Kelly	5	15	16
(United States) Bruce Pontow (United States) Pam Bristol Brady	15	10	18

== Devlin Cup ==
The Devlin Cup was a mixed team badminton tournament between the two Pan American countries, the United States and Canada. The biennial tournament was first held in 1956. In 1977, the tournament acted as a prelude and a team event to the Pan American championships. The tournament was later proposed to be merged with the Pan American Championships in the next few editions.

Canada won the Cup for a third time, defeating the United States 3–2 in the tie.

=== Canada vs United States ===
Canada
3
Université de Moncton
21 April 1977

United States
2

			1	2	3
1	(Canada) (United States)	Jamie McKee; Chris Kinard	15; 13	15; 6
2	(Canada) (United States)	Wendy Clarkson; Pam Bristol Brady	11; 3	11; 1
3	(Canada) (United States)	Ian Johnson / Pat Tryon; Bruce Pontow / Mike Walker	10; 15	15; 12	9; 15
4	(Canada) (United States)	Wendy Clarkson / Lesley Harris; Diana Osterhues / Janet Wilts	15; 9	15; 11
5	(Canada) (United States)	Ian Johnson / Tracy van Wassenhove; Bruce Pontow / Pam Bristol Brady	5; 15	13; 18
