= 2004 Pan Am Badminton Championships =

Tournament details
- Dates: 20–22 April
- Nations: 5
- Venue: Club de Regatas Lima
- Location: Lima, Peru

The 2004 Pan Am Badminton Championships (Spanish: Campeonato Panamericano de Bádminton 2004) was the eleventh edition of the Pan American Badminton Championships. The tournament was held from 20 to 22 April at Club de Regatas Lima in Lima, Peru.

This was the second consecutive time Peru had hosted the championships after they hosted the 2001 championships in Lima. Only the mixed team event was held. Five countries competed in the championships. Suriname made their first appearance in the mixed team championships.

Canada won gold in the mixed team event, followed by Peru with the silver medal and the United States with the bronze medal.

== Medal summary ==
=== Medalists ===
Event	Gold	Silver	Bronze
Mixed team	Canada; Mike Beres; Andrew Dabeka; Kyle Hunter; Philippe Bourret; Helen Nichol; Jody Patrick; Charmaine Reid; Anna Rice	Peru; Mario Carulla; Andrés Corpancho; Javier Jimeno; Rodrigo Pacheco; Lorena Blanco; Sandra Jimeno; Doriana Rivera; Valeria Rivero	United States; Howard Bach; Mike Chansawangpuvana; Kevin Han; Raju Rai; Jennifer Coleman; Eva Lee; Mesinee Mangkalakiri; Jamie Subandhi

=== Medal table ===
* Host nation (Peru)

Rank	Nation	Gold	Silver	Bronze	Total
1	Canada	1	0	0	1
2	Peru*	0	1	0	1
3	United States	0	0	1	1
Totals (3 entries)		1	1	1	3

== Results ==
=== Round robin ===
Five teams competed in the tournament. Canada finished first after winning 4–1 against the United States and 5–0 against Peru, Brazil and Suriname. The United States who were expected to finish in the top 2 suffered a major upset when the team lost 3–2 to Peru. The team had to settle for third place despite defeating Brazil and Suriname 5–0 while Peru were awarded silver. Brazil also suffered an upset defeat after losing 3–2 to Suriname, whom they have previously defeated in the 1998 South American Badminton Championships team event.

Pos	Team	Pld	W	L	MF	MA	MD	Pts	Qualification
1	Canada	4	4	0	19	1	+18	4	Champions
2	Peru	4	3	1	13	7	+6	3	Runners-up
3	United States	4	2	2	13	7	+6	2	Third place
4	Suriname	4	1	3	3	17	−14	1	Fourth place
5	Brazil	4	0	4	2	18	−16	0	Fifth place

Canada	4–1	United States
Canada	5–0	Peru
Canada	5–0	Brazil
Canada	5–0	Suriname
United States	2–3	Peru
United States	5–0	Brazil
United States	5–0	Suriname
Peru	5–0	Brazil
Peru	5–0	Suriname
Brazil	2–3	Suriname
