= 1987 Pan Am Badminton Championships =

Tournament details
- Dates: 18–19 November (Team event); 19–22 November (Individual event)
- Nations: 7
- Venue: Club Lawn Tennis de la Exposición (Team event); Club de Regatas Lima (Individual event)
- Location: Lima, Peru

Champions
- Men's singles: (Canada) Mike Butler
- Women's singles: (Canada) Denyse Julien
- Men's doubles: (Canada) Mike Butler (Canada) Anil Kaul
- Women's doubles: (Canada) Linda Cloutier (Canada) Denyse Julien
- Mixed doubles: (Canada) Mike Butler (Canada) Denyse Julien

The 1987 Pan Am Badminton Championships (Spanish: Campeonato Panamericano de Bádminton 1987) was the fifth edition of the Pan American Badminton Championships. The team event was held from 18 to 19 November at Club Lawn Tennis de la Exposición while the individual events were held from 19 to 22 November at Club de Regatas Lima. Seven countries competed in the championships.

Canada dominated the championships with six gold medals, two silver medals and one bronze. Hosts Peru finished second on the medal table with four silver medals and seven bronze medals.

== Medal summary ==
=== Medalists ===
Event	Gold	Silver	Bronze
Men's singles	(Canada) Mike Butler	(Peru) Gustavo Salazar	(Canada) Anil Kaul
Men's singles	(Canada) Mike Butler	(Peru) Gustavo Salazar	(Peru) Federico Valdez
Women's singles	(Canada) Denyse Julien	(Canada) Linda Cloutier	(Peru) Gloria Jiménez
Women's singles	(Canada) Denyse Julien	(Canada) Linda Cloutier	(Peru) Ximena Bellido
Men's doubles	(Canada) Mike Butler (Canada) Anil Kaul	(Peru) Gustavo Salazar (Peru) Federico Valdez	(Peru) Álvaro García (Peru) Juan Carlos Hintze
Men's doubles	(Canada) Mike Butler (Canada) Anil Kaul	(Peru) Gustavo Salazar (Peru) Federico Valdez	(United States) Chris Jogis (United States) Benny Lee
Women's doubles	(Canada) Linda Cloutier (Canada) Denyse Julien	(Peru) Ximena Bellido (Peru) Gloria Jiménez	(United States) Linda French (United States) Joy Kitzmiller
Women's doubles	(Canada) Linda Cloutier (Canada) Denyse Julien	(Peru) Ximena Bellido (Peru) Gloria Jiménez	(Peru) Francis MacKay (Peru) Patricia del Carpio
Mixed doubles	(Canada) Mike Butler (Canada) Denyse Julien	(Canada) Anil Kaul (Canada) Linda Cloutier	(Peru) Germán Valdez (Peru) Francis MacKay
Mixed doubles	(Canada) Mike Butler (Canada) Denyse Julien	(Canada) Anil Kaul (Canada) Linda Cloutier	(Peru) Federico Valdez (Peru) Gloria Jiménez
Mixed team	Canada; Mike Butler; Anil Kaul; Linda Cloutier; Denyse Julien	Peru; Gustavo Salazar; Federico Valdez; Germán Valdez; Álvaro García; Juan Carlos Hintze; Mario Carulla; Ricardo Newton; Ximena Bellido; Gloria Jiménez; Francis MacKay; Patricia del Carpio; Patricia de Bedoya; Marisol Jaymez	United States; Chris Jogis; Benny Lee; Linda French; Joy Kitzmiller

=== Medal table ===
* Host nation (Peru)

Rank	Nation	Gold	Silver	Bronze	Total
1	Canada (CAN)	6	2	1	9
2	Peru (PER)*	0	4	7	11
3	United States (USA)	0	0	3	3
Totals (3 entries)		6	6	11	23

== Individual results ==
=== Men's singles ===
Quarter-finals
(Canada) Mike Butler	15	15
(Peru) José Iturriaga	2	1
(United States) Benny Lee	12	15	6
(Peru) Federico Valdez	15	11	15
(Peru) Gustavo Salazar	15	15
(Peru) Álvaro García	11	4
(Peru) Germán Valdez	15	3	14
(Canada) Anil Kaul	2	15	17

Semi-finals
(Canada) Mike Butler	15	15
(Peru) Federico Valdez	5	5
(Peru) Gustavo Salazar	9	15	17
(Canada) Anil Kaul	15	3	14

Final
(Canada) Mike Butler	15	15
(Peru) Gustavo Salazar	4	3

=== Women's singles ===
Quarter-finals
(Canada) Denyse Julien	11	11
(Peru) Carmen Pflucker	0	1
(United States) Joy Kitzmiller	7	5
(Peru) Ximena Bellido	11	11
(Peru) Gloria Jiménez	11	11
(Trinidad and Tobago) Debra O'Connor	5	4
(United States) Linda French	2	4
(Canada) Linda Cloutier	11	11

Semi-finals
(Canada) Denyse Julien	11	11
(Peru) Ximena Bellido	2	7
(Peru) Gloria Jiménez	4	2
(Canada) Linda Cloutier	11	11

Final
(Canada) Denyse Julien	12	11	11
(Canada) Linda Cloutier	11	12	6

=== Men's doubles ===
Quarter-finals
(Canada) Mike Butler (Canada) Anil Kaul	15	15
(Peru) Gianfranco Brazzini (Peru) Christian Schroeder	2	2
(United States) Chris Jogis (United States) Benny Lee	15	11	15
(Peru) José Iturriaga (Peru) Germán Valdez	6	15	9
(Peru) Álvaro García (Peru) Juan Carlos Hintze	15	7	15
(Peru) Mario Carulla (Peru) Ricardo Newton	11	15	13
(Jamaica) D. L. King (Jamaica) Andrei Wiltshire	0	9
(Peru) Gustavo Salazar (Peru) Federico Valdez	15	15

Semi-finals
(Canada) Mike Butler (Canada) Anil Kaul	15	18
(United States) Chris Jogis (United States) Benny Lee	9	13
(Peru) Álvaro García (Peru) Juan Carlos Hintze	1	2
(Peru) Gustavo Salazar (Peru) Federico Valdez	15	15

Final
(Canada) Mike Butler (Canada) Anil Kaul	15	15
(Peru) Gustavo Salazar (Peru) Federico Valdez	8	9

=== Women's doubles ===
Quarter-finals
(Canada) Linda Cloutier (Canada) Denyse Julien	15	15
(Peru) Patricia de Bedoya (Peru) Marisol Jaymez	7	6
(Peru) Francis MacKay (Peru) Patricia del Carpio	15	15
(Jamaica) Deborah Binns (Peru) Carmen Pflucker	7	3
(Peru) Ximena Bellido (Peru) Gloria Jiménez	15	15
(Guatemala) Anna Palarea (Guatemala) Rosabel Vasquez	0	3
(Trinidad and Tobago) Debra O'Connor (Trinidad and Tobago) Beverly Tang	5	7
(United States) Linda French (United States) Joy Kitzmiller	15	15

Semi-finals
(Canada) Linda Cloutier (Canada) Denyse Julien	15	15
(Peru) Francis MacKay (Peru) Patricia del Carpio	3	1
(Peru) Ximena Bellido (Peru) Gloria Jiménez	18	15
(United States) Linda French (United States) Joy Kitzmiller	13	3

Final
(Canada) Linda Cloutier (Canada) Denyse Julien	15	18
(Peru) Ximena Bellido (Peru) Gloria Jiménez	7	16

=== Mixed doubles ===
Quarter-finals
(Canada) Mike Butler (Canada) Denyse Julien	15	15
(Peru) José Iturriaga (Peru) Ximena Bellido	10	5
(Peru) Germán Valdez (Peru) Francis MacKay	18	17
(United States) Dean Schoppe (United States) Linda French	13	15
(Peru) Mario Carulla (Peru) Patricia de Bedoya	7	1
(Peru) Federico Valdez (Peru) Gloria Jiménez	15	15
(United States) Benny Lee (United States) Joy Kitzmiller	15	9	14
(Canada) Anil Kaul (Canada) Linda Cloutier	13	15	18

Semi-finals
(Canada) Mike Butler (Canada) Denyse Julien	15	15
(Peru) Germán Valdez (Peru) Francis MacKay	6	3
(Peru) Federico Valdez (Peru) Gloria Jiménez	14	15
(Canada) Anil Kaul (Canada) Linda Cloutier	18	17

Final
(Canada) Mike Butler (Canada) Denyse Julien	15	15
(Canada) Anil Kaul (Canada) Linda Cloutier	5	6

== Team event ==
=== Group stage ===
==== Group A ====
Team	Pld	W	L	MF	MA	MD	Pts
Peru	3	3	0	15	0	+15	3
Jamaica	3	2	1	6	9	−3	2
Guatemala	3	1	2	6	9	−3	1
Brazil	3	0	3	1	14	−13	0

Peru	5–0	Jamaica
Peru	5–0	Guatemala
Peru	5–0	Brazil
Jamaica	3–2	Guatemala
Jamaica	3–2	Brazil
Guatemala	4–1	Brazil

==== Group B ====
Team	Pld	W	L	MF	MA	MD	Pts
Canada	2	2	0	10	0	+10	2
United States	2	1	1	5	5	0	1
Trinidad and Tobago	2	0	2	0	10	−10	0

Canada	5–0	United States
Canada	5–0	Trinidad and Tobago
United States	5–0	Trinidad and Tobago

=== Knockout stage ===
Canada won the mixed team final by defeating Peru 5–0 while the United States defeated Jamaica 5–0 for third place.

Semi-finals
Peru	4
United States	1
Jamaica
Canada	w/o

Final
Peru	0
Canada	5
Third place
United States	w/o
Jamaica
