= United States national badminton team =

National badminton team representing the United States of America

United States
- Association: USA Badminton (USAB)
- Confederation: BPA (Pan America)
- President: Fred Teng

BWF ranking
- Current ranking: 13 ▲1 (October 6, 2026)
- Highest ranking: 13 (October 6, 2026)

Sudirman Cup
- Appearances: 16 (first in 1989)
- Best result: Group stage

Thomas Cup
- Appearances: 10 (first in 1949)
- Best result: Runners-up (1952)

Uber Cup
- Appearances: 12 (first in 1957)
- Best result: Champions (1957, 1960, 1963)

Pan Am Mixed Team Championships
- Appearances: 22 (first in 1977)
- Best result: Champions (2001)

Pan Am Men's Team Championships
- Appearances: 5 (first in 2016)
- Best result: Runners-up (2018)

Pan Am Women's Team Championships
- Appearances: 5 (first in 2016)
- Best result: Champions (2016, 2022)

The United States national badminton team represents the United States in international badminton team competitions. The national team is controlled by the governing body for badminton in the country, USA Badminton. The United States is one of the five founding members of the Badminton Pan America. The U.S. team varies from tournament to tournament and is not a consistent body like most other countries. Each tournament has different members and selection criteria. After the team plays the event, the team disbands and a new team is formed each time. This varies from countries such as China, India, Japan, etc. where a state-funded permanent national team is formed that represents the country in all events, including individual events.

The United States achieved immense success from the 1940s to the 1970s, but declined afterwards. In 1952, the men's team were runners-up at the 1952 edition of the Thomas Cup where they lost to Malaya. The woman's team achieved a title hat-trick in the Uber Cup, winning the title three consecutive times from 1957 to 1963.

In individual events, the United States has won 1 gold medal in the BWF World Championships. It was won by Howard Bach and Tony Gunawan in the 2005 edition held in Anaheim, California.

== History ==
Badminton in the United States dates back to the late 19th century. The first American badminton club was formed in New York in 1878. During the 1930s, badminton had become a popular sport in the United States. Establishments such as the YMCA, universities and more all formed badminton clubs and the popularity of the sport began to take growth. The sport was also aided by the support of celebrity participation.

Celebrities such as Bette Davis, Douglas Fairbanks, Dick Powell, and others all participated in the sport, helping badminton gain popularity during the mid-half of the 20th century.

=== Men's team ===
The United States competed in the first edition of the Thomas Cup in 1949. The team won bronze after losing 6–3 in the knockout stages to Malaya. American badminton legends Joe Alston and Wynn Rogers helped the team to advanced one step further and reach the final of the 1952 Thomas Cup when they defeated the Indian doubles pair and earned the winning point for the team. In the final of the 1952 Thomas Cup, the team lost to Malaya. After their participation in the 1967 Thomas Cup, the men's team started to show a decline in quality after failing to qualify for the Thomas Cup for almost 4 decades.

In 2004, the team qualified for the 2004 Thomas Cup again after they won the 2004 Pan American Men's Team Championships. The team were eliminated in the wild-card knockout stage thrice in 2004, 2006 and 2010. In 2022, the team finished in 4th place at the 2022 Pan Am Male Badminton Cup. The team however still qualified for the 2022 Thomas Cup after the withdrawal of New Zealand. They were placed in Group D with Malaysia, Japan and England. The team finished on the bottom of the group and did not advance to the knockout stage.

In the 2024 Pan Am Male Badminton Cup, the team were eliminated in the group stages after losing to Brazil and Mexico in their group.

=== Women's team ===
The American women's team triumphed between the 1950s and the 1960s. They were the first to be crowned as Uber Cup champions in 1957. The team, led by stalwarts such as Judy Devlin and Margaret Varner first defeated Canada 7–0 in the qualifying round, then beat India 7–0 in the knockout round. In the final stage, they overcame their Danish opponents and defeated them 6–1 in the final. The team won their second Uber Cup by beating Denmark for a second time. In 1963, the American team won the Uber Cup title for a third time after winning 4–3 against England. In 1966, the team's Uber Cup reign came to an end when they lost 5–2 to Japan in the 1966 Uber Cup final. The women's team also suffered a massive decline after the 1960s and failed to qualify for the Uber Cup for a few years. The team finished third in the 1978 Uber Cup.

In 2006, the team qualified for the Uber Cup once again after failing to qualify for almost 30 years. The team were eliminated in the first round of the knockout stages. In 2022, the women's team won the 2022 Pan Am Female Badminton Cup and qualified for the 2022 Uber Cup. The team finished last in the group. In 2024, the team were runners-up at the 2024 Pan Am Female Badminton Cup. The team lost 3–0 to Canada in the final.

=== Mixed team ===
The United States first competed in the 1989 Sudirman Cup. The team were grouped with New Zealand, Finland and Austria in the Group 5 classification group. The team lost 5–0 to New Zealand, then beat Finland and Austria 5–0 to finish in 21st place. In 2001, the team made history by winning their first mixed team title at the 2001 Pan Am Mixed Team Championships after beating Canada in the final. In the 2019 Sudirman Cup, the United States finished in 19th place after defeating Israel in the 19th place tie.

In 2023, the United States reached the final of the 2023 Pan Am Mixed Team Championships but lost 3–0 to Canada.

== Competitive record ==
=== Thomas Cup ===
Year	Round	Pos
1949	First round inter-zone	3rd
1952	Runners-up	2nd
1955	First round inter-zone	4th
1958	First round inter-zone	5th
1961	First round inter-zone	4th
1964	Did not qualify	
1967	First round inter-zone	5th
1970	Did not qualify	
1973	Did not qualify	
1976	Did not qualify	
1979	Did not qualify	
1982	Did not qualify	
1984	Did not qualify	
1986	Did not qualify	
1988	Did not qualify	
1990	Did not qualify	
1992	Did not qualify	
1994	Did not qualify	
1996	Did not qualify	
1998	Did not qualify	
2000	Did not qualify	
2002	Did not qualify	
2004	Round of 16	12th
2006	Round of 16	9th
2008	Did not qualify	
2010	Did not qualify	
2012	Group stage	10th
2014	Did not qualify	
2016	Did not qualify	
2018	Did not qualify	
2020	Did not qualify	
2022	Group stage	15th
2024	Did not qualify	
2026	Did not qualify	
2028	To be determined	
2030	To be determined	

=== Uber Cup ===
Year	Round	Pos
1957	Champions	1st
1960	Champions	1st
1963	Champions	1st
1966	Runners-up	2nd
1969	First round inter-zone	4th
1972	Did not qualify	
1975	Did not qualify	
1978	Second round inter-zone	3rd
1981	Did not qualify	
1984	Did not qualify	
1986	Did not qualify	
1988	Did not qualify	
1990	Did not qualify	
1992	Did not qualify	
1994	Did not qualify	
1996	Did not qualify	
1998	Did not qualify	
2000	Did not qualify	
2002	Did not qualify	
2004	Did not qualify	
2006	Round of 16	10th
2008	Round of 16	11th
2010	Group stage	11th
2012	Group stage	11th
2014	Did not qualify	
2016	Group stage	11th
2018	Did not qualify	
2020	Did not qualify	
2022	Group stage	13th
2024	Group stage	11th
2026	Did not qualify	
2028	To be determined	
2030	To be determined	

=== Sudirman Cup ===
Year	Round	Pos
1989	Group stage	21st
1991	Group stage	22nd
1993	Group stage	25th
1995	Group stage	25th
1997	Group stage	24th
1999	Group stage	28th
2001	Group stage	24th
2003	Group stage	20th
2005	Group stage	20th
2007	Group stage	20th
2009	Group stage	20th
2011	Group stage	18th
2013	Group stage	19th
2015	Group stage	18th
2017	Group stage	18th
2019	Group stage	19th
2021	Did not qualify	
2023	Did not qualify	
2025	Did not qualify	
2027	To be determined	
2029	To be determined	

=== Pan American Team Championships ===
==== Men's team ====
Year	Round	Pos
2016	Fourth place	4th
2018	Runners-up	2nd
2020	Third place	3rd
2022	Fourth place	4th
2024	Group stage	5th
2026	Runners-up	2nd
2028	To be determined	
2030	To be determined	

==== Women's team ====
Year	Round	Pos
2016	Champions	1st
2018	Runners-up	2nd
2020	Runners-up	2nd
2022	Champions	1st
2024	Runners-up	2nd
2026	Runners-up	2nd
2028	To be determined	
2030	To be determined	

==== Mixed team ====
Year	Round	Pos
1977	Runners-up	2nd
1978	Did not enter	
1979	Runners-up	2nd
1980	Runners-up	2nd
1987	Third place	3rd
1989	Runners-up	2nd
1991	Runners-up	2nd
1993	Did not enter	
1997	Runners-up	2nd
2001	Champions	1st
2004	Third place	3rd
2005	Runners-up	2nd
2007	Runners-up	2nd
2008	Third place	3rd
2009	Group stage	5th
2010	Runners-up	2nd
2012	Runners-up	2nd
2013	Runners-up	2nd
2014	Runners-up	2nd
2016	Group stage	5th
2017	Third place	3rd
2019	Runners-up	2nd
2023	Runners-up	2nd
2025	Runners-up	2nd
2027	To be determined	
2029	To be determined	

=== FISU World University Games ===
==== Mixed team ====
Year	Round	Pos
2007	Did not enter	
2011	Did not enter	
2013	Group stage	18th
2015	Group stage	20th
2017	Group stage	12th
2021	Quarter-finals	8th
2025	Round of 16	11th

=== World University Team Championships ===
==== Mixed team ====
Year	Round	Pos
2008	Did not enter	
2010	Did not enter	
2012	Did not enter	
2014	Group stage	15th
2016	Did not enter	
2018	Group stage	14th

**Red border color indicates tournament was held on home soil.

== Junior competitive record ==
=== Suhandinata Cup ===
Year	Round	Pos
2000	Did not enter	
2002	Did not enter	
2004	Group stage	20th
2006	Group stage	20th
2007	Group stage	16th
2008	Did not enter	
2009	Did not enter	
2010	Group stage	20th
2011	Group stage	21st
2012	Group stage	20th
2013	Group stage	27th
2014	Group stage	20th
2015	Group stage	19th
2016	Group stage	14th
2017	Group stage	22nd
2018	Group stage	18th
2019	Group stage	18th
2020	Cancelled because of COVID-19 pandemic	
2021	Cancelled because of COVID-19 pandemic	
2022	Quarter-finals	6th
2023	Group stage	10th
2024	Quarter-finals	7th
2025	Quarter-finals	7th of 36
2026	Group stage	10th of 47

=== Pan American Junior Team Championships ===
==== Mixed team ====
Year	Round	Pos
1977	Runners-up	2nd
1978	Runners-up	2nd
1979	Runners-up	2nd
1980	Runners-up	2nd
1981	Third place	3rd
1988	Runners-up	2nd
1990	Runners-up	2nd
1991	Did not enter	
1992	Did not enter	
1994	Did not enter	
1996	Champions	1st
1998	Runners-up	2nd
2000	Runners-up	2nd
2002	Champions	1st
2004	Champions	1st
2006	Third place	3rd
2007	Champions	1st
2008	Third place	3rd
2009	Champions	1st
2010	Champions	1st
2011	Fourth place	4th
2012	Champions	1st
2013	Third place	3rd
2014	Champions	1st
2015	Champions	1st
2016	Third place	3rd
2017	Champions	1st
2018	Third place	3rd
2019	Runners-up	2nd
2021	Champions	1st
2022	Champions	1st
2023	Champions	1st
2024	Champions	1st
2025	Champions	1st
2026	Champions	1st

**Red border color indicates tournament was held on home soil.

== Players ==
=== Current squad ===
As of January 2, 2024

==== Men's team ====
Name	DoB/Age	Ranking of event		
Name	DoB/Age	MS	MD	XD
Enrico Asuncion	November 8, 1998 (age 28)	182	228	–
Adrian Mar	September 30, 2004 (age 22)	416	228	736
Vinson Chiu	August 8, 1998 (age 28)	–	50	31
Joshua Yuan	July 25, 2003 (age 23)	–	50	539
Howard Shu	November 28, 1990 (age 35)	76	–	–
Patrick Chi	April 4, 2006 (age 20)	811	–	494
Jacob Zhang	June 4, 2001 (age 25)	1057	383	–
William Hu	March 26, 2002 (age 24)	386	383	–
Chen Zhi-yi	August 18, 2004 (age 22)	–	65	238
Presley Smith	July 16, 2003 (age 23)	–	65	54

==== Women's team ====
Name	DoB/Age	Ranking of event		
Name	DoB/Age	WS	WD	XD
Beiwen Zhang	July 12, 1990 (age 36)	9	–	–
Iris Wang	September 2, 1994 (age 32)	44	–	–
Lauren Lam	January 15, 2003 (age 23)	49	44	–
Natalie Chi	October 9, 2004 (age 22)	350	–	494
Francesca Corbett	June 3, 2005 (age 21)	303	36	238
Allison Lee	March 24, 2005 (age 21)	–	36	54
Annie Xu	October 22, 1999 (age 27)	–	31	–
Kerry Xu	October 22, 1999 (age 27)	–	31	–
Esther Shi	November 7, 2001 (age 25)	182	–	241
Jennie Gai	February 25, 2001 (age 25)	94	–	31

=== Previous squads ===
==== Thomas Cup ====
- 1949, 1952, 2012, 2022

==== Uber Cup ====
- 1957, 1960, 1963, 1966, 2008, 2010, 2012, 2016, 2022
