= Roy Díaz González =

Mexican badminton player

Personal information
- Born: 1953 (age 72–73)

Sport
- Country: Mexico
- Sport: Badminton

Men's singles & doubles
- Highest ranking: 15 (MS, 1981)
Medal record
Men's badminton
Representing Mexico
Pan Am Championships
Gold medal – first place	1977 Moncton	Men's singles
Gold medal – first place	1980 San Diego	Men's singles

Roy Díaz González (born 1953) is a former world-class badminton player from Mexico. Something of a child prodigy in the sport, González began touring internationally at fourteen, the age at which he captured the first of his many Mexican national singles titles. He won the Belgian International men's doubles title at fifteen and the Swiss Open men's singles title at sixteen.

By his late teens, in the early 1970s, González was competitive with the world's best players, but he never developed the penetrating power, or the deceptive wizardry, which might have allowed him to break through in badminton's biggest events. Nevertheless, he remained a respected and dangerous opponent on the world scene for over a decade, admired for his footwork, stamina, and touch. In 1977 he won men's singles at the first ever Pan-American Badminton Championships.

González played in five Thomas Cup (men's international team) campaigns for Mexico, between 1970 and 1984, before finally losing a Thomas Cup singles match to another North American player. His advisor at the court was for a long time his father Dr. Jorge Díaz González.

== Achievements ==
=== Pan Am Championships ===
Men's singles

Year	Venue	Opponent	Score	Result
1977	Université de Moncton, Moncton, Canada	(Canada) Jamie McKee	17–14, 11–15, 15–9	Gold
1980	San Diego Badminton Club, San Diego, United States	(United States) Gary Higgins	15–5, 15–10	Gold

=== International Open Tournaments (5 titles, 4 runners-up) ===
Men's singles

Year	Tournament	Opponent	Score	Result
1969	Belgian International	(Singapore) Lee Kin Tat	3–15, 5–15	(silver) Runner-up
1970	Swiss Open	(Austria) Hermann Fröhlich	15–6, 15–5	(gold) Winner
1972	Mexican International	(Sweden) Sture Johnsson	8–15, 11–15	(silver) Runner-up
1974	Swiss Open	(Switzerland) Edy Andrey	15–3, 15–4	(gold) Winner
1977	Mexican International	(Mexico) Ricardo Jaramillo	15–5, 15–5	(gold) Winner

Men's doubles

Year	Tournament	Partner	Opponent	Score	Result
1969	Belgian International	(Singapore) Lee Kin Tat	(Malaysia) Ho Kim Kooi (Belgium) Remy	15–8, 15–5	(gold) Winner
1970	Swiss Open	(Austria) Hermann Fröhlich	(West Germany) Rupert Liebl (West Germany) Erich Eikelkamp	15–5, 15–10	(gold) Winner
1972	Mexican International	(Mexico) Victor Jaramillo	(Mexico) Jorge Palazuelos (Mexico) Francisco Sañudo	10–15, 14–17	(silver) Runner-up
1974	Swiss Open	(Switzerland) Claude Bovard	(Mexico) Ricardo Jaramillo (Mexico) Francisco Sañudo	9–15, 15–6, 12–15	(silver) Runner-up
