= Pam Bristol Brady =

American badminton player

Personal information
- Born: Pam Stockton; 1953 (age 72–73) Flint, Michigan, United States

Sport
- Country: United States
- Sport: Badminton
- Event: Women's singles & doubles
Medal record
Women's badminton
Representing United States
Pan Am Championships
Gold medal – first place	1977 Moncton	Women's doubles
Silver medal – second place	1977 Moncton	Mixed team
Bronze medal – third place	1980 San Diego	Women's doubles
Bronze medal – third place	1980 San Diego	Mixed doubles

Pam Bristol Brady (née Stockton; born 1953) is an American retired badminton player who excelled at both the national and international levels. Noted for her anticipation and crisp shot-making ability, she won twenty U.S. national titles between 1972 and 1985; four in singles, eleven in women's doubles, and five in mixed doubles.

== Career ==
In the three national championships that were open to foreign competition during her badminton prime (1972, 1973, 1976) she reached the final in six of nine events, winning the women's doubles with Diane Hales in 1973. She won South Africa's open singles and women's doubles titles during a U.S. team tour of that country in 1971. She shared both the women's doubles and mixed doubles titles at the first Pan American Championships in 1977.

She represented the USA in team matches including the Uber Cup (women's world team) campaigns of '71-'72, '77-'78, and '80-'81. Mrs. Brady was elected to the U.S. Badminton Hall of Fame in 1981. She is married to Danny Brady, a fine player in his own right, with whom she won national mixed doubles titles in 1981 and 1982.

== Achievements ==
=== Pan Am Championships ===
Women's doubles

Year	Venue	Partner	Opponent	Score	Result
1977	Université de Moncton, Moncton, Canada	(United States) Judianne Kelly	(United States) Diana Osterhues (United States) Janet Wilts	15–4, 15–9	Gold
1980	San Diego Badminton Club, San Diego, United States	(United States) Judianne Kelly	(Canada) Linda Cloutier (Canada) Johanne Falardeau		Bronze

Mixed doubles

Year	Venue	Partner	Opponent	Score	Result
1977	Université de Moncton, Moncton, Canada	(United States) Bruce Pontow	(United States) Mike Walker (United States) Judianne Kelly	15–5, 10–15, 18–16	Gold
1980	San Diego Badminton Club, San Diego, United States	(United States) Mike Walker	(United States) John Britton (United States) Cheryl Carton		Bronze

=== International Open Tournaments (1 title) ===
Women's doubles

Year	Tournament	Partner	Opponent	Score	Result
1971	South African Championships	(United States) Caroline Hein			(gold) Winner
