= Canada national badminton team =

National badminton team representing Canada

Canada
- Association: Badminton Canada (BC)
- Confederation: BPA (Pan America)
- President: Anil Kaul

BWF ranking
- Current ranking: 11 (6 October 2026)
- Highest ranking: 11 (4 July 2023)

Sudirman Cup
- Appearances: 14 (first in 1989)
- Best result: Group stage

Thomas Cup
- Appearances: 10 (first in 1970)
- Best result: Semi-finals (1970, 1973)

Uber Cup
- Appearances: 15 (first in 1960)
- Best result: Semi-finals (1975, 1981)

Pan Am Mixed Team Championships
- Appearances: 23 (first in 1977)
- Best result: Champions (1977, 1978, 1979, 1980, 1987, 1989, 1991, 1997, 2004, 2005, 2007, 2008, 2009, 2010, 2012, 2013, 2014, 2016, 2017, 2019, 2023, 2025)

Pan Am Men's Team Championships
- Appearances: 5 (first in 2016)
- Best result: Champions (2018, 2020, 2022)

Pan Am Women's Team Championships
- Appearances: 5 (first in 2016)
- Best result: Champions (2018, 2020, 2024)

The Canada national badminton team (French: Équipe nationale de badminton du Canada) represents Canada in international badminton team competitions. It is controlled by the nation's governing body of badminton, Badminton Canada. The team's best result was achieving two semifinal finishes in both Thomas Cup and the Uber Cup.

Canada is one of the most prestigious badminton countries in the Americas, winning almost every mixed team event in the Pan American Badminton Championships and also winning gold in both men and women's teams. Next to the United States, Canada has won 21 gold medals, 22 silvers and 12 bronzes in badminton at the Pan American Games.

The national team has won almost every edition of the Pan American Badminton Championships mixed team events except for one in 2001. The men's team have also become recent champions while the women's team lost to the United States in 2022.

== Competitive record ==
=== Thomas Cup ===
Year	Round	Pos
1949	Did not qualify	
1952	Did not qualify	
1955	Did not qualify	
1958	Did not qualify	
1961	Did not qualify	
1964	Did not qualify	
1967	Did not qualify	
1970	Second round inter-zone	4th
1973	Second round inter-zone	4th
1976	First round inter-zone	6th
1979	First round inter-zone	5th
1982	Did not qualify	
1984	Did not qualify	
1986	Did not qualify	
1988	Did not qualify	
1990	Did not qualify	
1992	Did not qualify	
1994	Did not qualify	
1996	Did not qualify	
1998	Did not qualify	
2000	Did not qualify	
2002	Did not qualify	
2004	Did not qualify	
2006	Did not qualify	
2008	Round of 16	9th
2010	Did not qualify	
2012	Did not qualify	
2014	Did not qualify	
2016	Did not qualify	
2018	Group stage	14th
2020	Group stage	12th
2022	Group stage	14th
2024	Group stage	12th
2026	Group stage	11th
2028	To be determined	
2030	To be determined	

=== Uber Cup ===
Year	Round	Pos
1957	Did not qualify	
1960	First round inter-zone	4th
1963	First round inter-zone	5th
1966	First round inter-zone	5th
1969	Did not qualify	
1972	First round inter-zone	5th
1975	Second round inter-zone	4th
1978	Did not qualify	
1981	Second round inter-zone	4th
1984	Group stage	6th
1986	Group stage	8th
1988	Did not qualify	
1990	Did not qualify	
1992	Did not qualify	
1994	Did not qualify	
1996	Did not qualify	
1998	Did not qualify	
2000	Did not qualify	
2002	Did not qualify	
2004	Round of 16	12th
2006	Did not qualify	
2008	Did not qualify	
2010	Did not qualify	
2012	Did not qualify	
2014	Group stage	14th
2016	Did not qualify	
2018	Quarter-finals	8th
2020	Group stage	11th
2022	Group stage	10th
2024	Group stage	9th
2026	Group stage	9th
2028	To be determined	
2030	To be determined	

=== Sudirman Cup ===
Year	Round	Pos
1989	Group stage	13th
1991	Group stage	14th
1993	Group stage	12th
1995	Group stage	12th
1997	Group stage	14th
1999	Group stage	18th
2001	Group stage	16th
2003	Did not enter	
2005	Did not enter	
2007	Group stage	22nd
2009	Did not enter	
2011	Group stage	16th
2013	Group stage	18th
2015	Group stage	19th
2017	Group stage	16th
2019	Group stage	13th
2021	Group stage	13th
2023	Group stage	12th
2025	Group stage	9th
2027	To be determined	
2029	To be determined	

=== Commonwealth Games ===
==== Men's team ====
Year	Round	Pos
1998	Quarter-finals	

==== Women's team ====
Year	Round	Pos
1998	Quarter-finals	

==== Mixed team ====
Year	Round	Pos
1978	Runners-up	2nd
1982	Runners-up	2nd
1986	Runners-up	2nd
1990	Runners-up	2nd
1994	Group stage	
2002	Group stage	
2006	Group stage	
2010	Quarter-finals	
2014	Quarter-finals	
2018	Quarter-finals	
2022	Quarter-finals	
2026	TBD	

=== Pan American Team Championships ===
==== Men's team ====
Year	Round	Pos
2016	Runners-up	2nd
2018	Champions	1st
2020	Champions	1st
2022	Champions	1st
2024	Champions	1st
2026	Champions	1st
2028	To be determined	
2030	To be determined	

==== Women's team ====
Year	Round	Pos
2016	Runners-up	2nd
2018	Champions	1st
2020	Champions	1st
2022	Runners-up	2nd
2024	Champions	1st
2026	Champions	1st
2028	To be determined	
2030	To be determined	

==== Mixed team ====
Year	Round	Pos
1977	Champions	1st
1978	Champions	1st
1979	Champions	1st
1980	Champions	1st
1987	Champions	1st
1989	Champions	1st
1991	Champions	1st
1993	Did not enter	
1997	Champions	1st
2001	Runners-up	2nd
2004	Champions	1st
2005	Champions	1st
2007	Champions	1st
2008	Champions	1st
2009	Champions	1st
2010	Champions	1st
2012	Champions	1st
2013	Champions	1st
2014	Champions	1st
2016	Champions	1st
2017	Champions	1st
2019	Champions	1st
2023	Champions	1st
2025	Champions	1st
2027	To be determined	
2029	To be determined	

=== FISU World University Games ===
==== Mixed team ====
Year	Round	Pos
2007	Group stage	
2011	Did not enter	
2013	Group stage	
2015	Group stage	
2017	Group stage	
2021	Did not enter	
2025	TBD	

=== World University Team Championships ===
==== Mixed team ====
Year	Round	Pos
2008	Did not enter	
2010	Did not enter	
2012	Quarter-finals	6th
2014	Group stage	11th
2016	Group stage	10th
2018	Group stage	12th

**Red border color indicates tournament was held on home soil.

== Junior competitive record ==
=== Suhandinata Cup ===
Year	Round	Pos
2000	Group stage	21st
2002	Did not enter	
2004	Group stage	18th
2006	Group stage	21st
2007	Did not enter	
2008	Group stage	10th
2009	Group stage	18th
2010	Group stage	16th
2011	Group stage	19th
2012	Group stage	21st
2013	Group stage	18th
2014	Group stage	19th
2015	Group stage	13th
2016	Group stage	19th
2017	Group stage	18th
2018	Group stage	17th
2019	Group stage	25th
2020	Cancelled because of COVID-19 pandemic	
2021	Cancelled because of COVID-19 pandemic	
2022	Group stage	11th
2023	Group stage	17th
2024	Did not enter	
2025	Group stage	15th of 36
2026	Group stage	18th of 47

=== Commonwealth Youth Games ===
==== Mixed team ====
Year	Round	Pos
2004	Did not enter	

=== Pan American Junior Team Championships ===
==== Mixed team ====
Year	Round	Pos
1977	Champions	1st
1978	Champions	1st
1979	Champions	1st
1980	Champions	1st
1981	Runners-up	2nd
1988	Champions	1st
1990	Did not enter	
1991	Did not enter	
1992	Did not enter	
1994	Did not enter	
1996	Runners-up	2nd
1998	Champions	1st
2000	Champions	1st
2002	Fourth place	4th
2004	Runners-up	2nd
2006	Runners-up	2nd
2007	Third place	3rd
2008	Quarter-finals	6th
2009	Third place	3rd
2010	Third place	3rd
2011	Champions	1st
2012	Runners-up	2nd
2013	Champions	1st
2014	Did not enter	
2015	Third place	3rd
2016	Champions	1st
2017	Runners-up	2nd
2018	Champions	1st
2019	Champions	1st
2021	Did not enter	
2022	Runners-up	2nd
2023	Runners-up	2nd
2024	Runners-up	2nd
2025	Runners-up	2nd
2026	Runners-up	2nd

**Red border color indicates tournament was held on home soil.

== Players ==
=== Current squad ===
As of 2 January 2024

==== Men's team ====
Name	DoB/Age	Ranking of event		
Name	DoB/Age	MS	MD	XD
Brian Yang	25 November 2001 (age 24)	26	-	-
Victor Lai	19 December 2004 (age 21)	107	-	-
Josh Nguyen	9 September 2005 (age 21)	367	-	-
Imran Wadia	24 October 1996 (age 30)	175	717	255
Nyl Yakura	14 February 1993 (age 33)	-	34	217
Adam Dong	14 February 1994 (age 32)	-	34	691
Kevin Lee	10 November 1998 (age 28)	-	41	123
Ty Alexander Lindeman	15 August 1997 (age 29)	-	41	29
B. R. Sankeerth	22 December 1997 (age 28)	156	455	1392
Joshua Hurlburt-Yu	28 December 1994 (age 31)	-	455	90

==== Women's team ====
Name	DoB/Age	Ranking of event		
Name	DoB/Age	WS	WD	XD
Michelle Li	3 November 1991 (age 35)	24	526	-
Wenyu Zhang	29 August 2002 (age 24)	46	91	740
Talia Ng	6 November 2001 (age 25)	70	91	494
Rachel Chan	15 November 2003 (age 23)	65	-	426
Catherine Choi	1 May 2001 (age 25)	-	28	426
Josephine Wu	20 January 1995 (age 31)	-	28	29
Rachel Honderich	21 April 1996 (age 30)	-	232	90
Jacqueline Cheung	18 October 2002 (age 24)	-	232	279
Camille Leblanc	16 August 1996 (age 30)	-	242	-
Alexandra Mocanu	1 December 1999 (age 26)	-	242	361

=== Previous squads ===
==== Sudirman Cup ====
- 2019, 2021, 2023

==== Thomas Cup ====
- 1973, 2018, 2020, 2022

==== Uber Cup ====
- 2014, 2018, 2020, 2022
