= 1980 Pan Am Badminton Championships =

Tournament details
- Dates: 2–4 October 1980
- Nations: 4
- Venue: San Diego Badminton Club
- Location: San Diego, United States

Champions
- Men's singles: (Mexico) Roy Díaz González
- Women's singles: (Canada) Johanne Falardeau
- Men's doubles: (United States) John Britton (United States) Gary Higgins
- Women's doubles: (Canada) Linda Cloutier (Canada) Johanne Falardeau
- Mixed doubles: (United States) John Britton (United States) Cheryl Carton

The 1980 Pan Am Badminton Championships was the fourth edition of the Pan American Badminton Championships. The individual events of the tournament were held from 2 to 4 October 1980 at the San Diego Badminton Club in San Diego. Four countries competed in the championships, which were Canada, Mexico Peru, and the United States.

== Results summary ==
In the men's singles event, Roy Díaz González of Mexico won his second Pan American men's singles title after defeating Gary Higgins in the final. Canada's Johanne Falardeau won the final for a third consecutive time in women's singles, defeating Sandra Skillings. In men's doubles, John Britton and Gary Higgins defeated Canada's Dave deBelle and Bob MacDougall in the final. In women's doubles, Linda Cloutier and Johanne Falardeau defeated Cheryl Carton and Vicky Toutz in the final. In mixed doubles, Britton and Carton partnered up to defeat Priestman and Skillings of Canada in the final.

== Medal summary ==
=== Medalists ===
Event	Gold	Silver	Bronze
Men's singles	(Mexico) Roy Díaz González	(United States) Gary Higgins	(Canada) John Czich
Men's singles	(Mexico) Roy Díaz González	(United States) Gary Higgins	(Canada) Keith Priestman
Women's singles	(Canada) Johanne Falardeau	(Canada) Sandra Skillings	(Canada) Wendy Carter
Women's singles	(Canada) Johanne Falardeau	(Canada) Sandra Skillings	(United States) Cheryl Carton
Men's doubles	(United States) John Britton (United States) Gary Higgins	(Canada) Dave deBelle (Canada) Bob MacDougall	(Canada) John Czich (Canada) Keith Priestman
Men's doubles	(United States) John Britton (United States) Gary Higgins	(Canada) Dave deBelle (Canada) Bob MacDougall	(United States) Mathew Fogarty (United States) Mike Walker
Women's doubles	(Canada) Linda Cloutier (Canada) Johanne Falardeau	(United States) Cheryl Carton (United States) Vicky Toutz	(Canada) Denyse Julien (Canada) Sandra Skillings
Women's doubles	(Canada) Linda Cloutier (Canada) Johanne Falardeau	(United States) Cheryl Carton (United States) Vicky Toutz	(United States) Pam Bristol Brady (United States) Judianne Kelly
Mixed doubles	(United States) John Britton (United States) Cheryl Carton	(Canada) Keith Priestman (Canada) Sandra Skillings	(Canada) Jeff Goldsworthy (Canada) Linda Cloutier
Mixed doubles	(United States) John Britton (United States) Cheryl Carton	(Canada) Keith Priestman (Canada) Sandra Skillings	(United States) Mike Walker (United States) Pam Bristol Brady

=== Medal table ===
* Host nation (United States)

Rank	Nation	Gold	Silver	Bronze	Total
1	Canada (CAN)	2	3	6	11
2	United States (USA)*	2	3	4	9
3	Mexico (MEX)	1	0	0	1
Totals (3 entries)		5	6	10	21

== Devlin Cup ==
The Devlin Cup was held on 19 November 1980 at the Denver Athletic Club in Denver, Colorado. The United States regained their Devlin Cup title by defeating Canada in the final match 3–2.

=== Canada vs United States ===
Canada
2
Denver Athletic Club
19 November 1980

United States
3

			1	2	3
1	(Canada) (United States)	John Czich; Gary Higgins	14; 18	7; 15
2	(Canada) (United States)	Wendy Carter; Cheryl Carton	11; 1	11; 5
3	(Canada) (United States)	John Czich / Keith Priestman; Mathew Fogarty / Mike Walker	9; 15	15; 11	11; 15
4	(Canada) (United States)	Denyse Julien / Jane Youngberg; Pam Bristol Brady / Cheryl Carton	15; 9	8; 15	15; 2
5	(Canada) (United States)	Keith Priestman / Wendy Carter; Mike Walker / Pam Bristol Brady	9; 15	15; 8	14; 17
