= Pan American Badminton Championships =

Badminton tournament

The Pan American Badminton Championships is a tournament organized since 1977 by the Badminton Pan America (BPA) to crown the best badminton players in the Americas. The tournament was held every year from 1977 until 1980, then every two years from 1987 until 2007. It is now organized annually, except once every four years when the Pan American Games multi-sports event is held. Badminton has been part of the Pan American Games since 1995. Since then, 2007 was the only year in which both the Pan American Badminton Championships and the Pan American Games were held concurrently. The Pan American Badminton Championships once had a Grand Prix status.

== Championships ==
Number	Year	Host city	Events
1	1977	Moncton, Canada	6
2	1978	Lima, Peru	6
3	1979	Mexico City, Mexico	6
4	1980	San Diego, United States	6
5	1987	Lima, Peru	6
6	1989	Mexico City, Mexico	6
7	1991	Kingston, Jamaica	6
8	1993	Guatemala City, Guatemala	6
9	1997	Winnipeg, Canada	6
10	2001	Lima, Peru	6
11	2004	Lima, Peru	6
12	2005	Bridgetown, Barbados	6
13	2007	Calgary, Canada	6
14	2008	Lima, Peru	6
15	2009	Guadalajara, Mexico	6
16	2010	Curitiba, Brazil	6
17	2012	Lima, Peru	6
18	2013	Santo Domingo, Dominican Republic	6
19	2014	Markham, Canada	6
20	2016	Campinas, Brazil	6

Number	Year	Host city	Events
21	2017	Santo Domingo, Dominican Republic	1
21	2017	Havana, Cuba	5
22	2018	Tacarigua, Trinidad & Tobago	2
22	2018	Guatemala City, Guatemala	5
23	2019	Lima, Peru	1
23	2019	Aguascalientes, Mexico	5
24	2020	Salvador, Bahia, Brazil	2
24	2021	Guatemala City, Guatemala	5
25	2022	Acapulco, Mexico	2
25	2022	San Salvador, El Salvador	5
26	2023	Guadalajara, Mexico	1
26	2023	Kingston, Jamaica	5
27	2024	São Paulo, Brazil	2
27	2024	Guatemala City, Guatemala	5
28	2025	Aguascalientes, Mexico	1
28	2025	Lima, Peru	5
29	2026	Guatemala City, Guatemala	2
29	2026	Lima, Peru	5

== Individual championships ==
Champions:

Year	Men's Singles	Women's Singles	Men's Doubles	Women's Doubles	Mixed Doubles
1977	(Mexico) Roy Díaz González	(Canada) Wendy Clarkson	(Canada) John Czich (Canada) Jamie McKee	(United States) Pam Bristol Brady (United States) Judianne Kelly	(United States) Bruce Pontow (United States) Pam Bristol Brady
1978	(Canada) Jamie McKee	(Canada) Johanne Falardeau	(Canada) Greg Carter (Canada) Jamie McKee	(Canada) Wendy Clarkson (Canada) Johanne Falardeau	(Canada) Greg Carter (Canada) Wendy Clarkson
1979	(Mexico) Ricardo Jaramillo	(Canada) Johanne Falardeau	(Canada) Jaimie McKee (Canada) Pat Tryon	(Canada) Johanne Falardeau (Canada) Claire Sharpe	(Canada) Paul Johnson (Canada) Claire Sharpe
1980	(Mexico) Roy Díaz González	(Canada) Johanne Falardeau	(United States) John Britton (United States) Gary Higgins	(Canada) Johanne Falardeau (Canada) Linda Cloutier	(United States) John Britton (United States) Cheryl Carton
1987	(Canada) Mike Butler	(Canada) Denyse Julien	(Canada) Mike Butler (Canada) Anil Kaul	(Canada) Denyse Julien (Canada) Linda Cloutier	(Canada) Mike Butler (Canada) Denyse Julien
1989	(Canada) John Goss	(Canada) Doris Piché	(United States) Chris Jogis (United States) Benny Lee	(Canada) Chantal Jobin (Canada) Doris Piché	(Canada) Mike Bitten (Canada) Doris Piché
1991	(Canada) Jaimie Dawson	(Canada) Denyse Julien	(Canada) Mike Bitten (Canada) Bryan Blanshard	(Canada) Denyse Julien (Canada) Doris Piché	(Canada) Jaimie Dawson (Canada) Denyse Julien
1993	(Peru) Mario Carulla	(Trinidad and Tobago) Debra O'Connor	(Peru) Mario Carulla (Peru) José Iturriaga	(Peru) Silvia Jiménez (Peru) Teresa Montero	(Peru) Gustavo Salazar (Peru) Teresa Montero
1995	No 1995 Pan Am Badminton Championships due to 1995 Pan Am Games				
1997	(United States) Kevin Han	(Canada) Denyse Julien	(United States) Howard Bach (United States) Kevin Han	(Canada) Milaine Cloutier (Canada) Robbyn Hermitage	(Canada) Iain Sydie (Canada) Denyse Julien
1999	No 1999 Pan Am Badminton Championships due to 1999 Pan Am Games				
2001	(United States) Kevin Han	(United States) Meiluawati	(United States) Howard Bach (United States) Kevin Han	(Canada) Milaine Cloutier (Canada) Helen Nichol	(Canada) Keith Chan (Canada) Milaine Cloutier
2003	No 2003 Pan Am Badminton Championships due to 2003 Pan Am Games				
2005	(Canada) Andrew Dabeka	(Canada) Charmaine Reid	(United States) Khan Malaythong (United States) Raju Rai	(Canada) Helen Nichol (Canada) Charmaine Reid	(Canada) Mike Beres (Canada) Jody Patrick
2007	(Canada) Stephan Wojcikiewicz	(Canada) Anna Rice	(Canada) Mike Beres (Canada) William Milroy	(Canada) Fiona McKee (Canada) Charmaine Reid	(United States) Howard Bach (United States) Eva Lee
2008	(Canada) David Snider	(Peru) Claudia Rivero	(Canada) William Milroy (Canada) Toby Ng	(Peru) Cristina Aicardi (Peru) Claudia Rivero	(Canada) William Milroy (Canada) Fiona McKee
2009	(Guatemala) Kevin Cordón	(Canada) Anna Rice	(Guatemala) Kevin Cordón (Guatemala) Rodolfo Ramírez	(Canada) Milaine Cloutier (Canada) Valérie St. Jacques	(Canada) Toby Ng (Canada) Grace Gao
2010	(Canada) Stephan Wojcikiewicz	(United States) Cee Nantana Ketpura	(United States) Sameera Gunatileka (United States) Vincent Nguy	(Canada) Grace Gao (Canada) Joycelyn Ko	(Canada) Toby Ng (Canada) Grace Gao
2011	No 2011 Pan Am Badminton Championships due to 2011 Pan Am Games				
2012	(Guatemala) Kevin Cordón	(Canada) Christin Tsai	(Canada) Adrian Liu (Canada) Derrick Ng	(Canada) Alex Bruce (Canada) Phyllis Chan	(Canada) Derrick Ng (Canada) Alex Bruce
2013	(Cuba) Osleni Guerrero	(Canada) Michelle Li	(Canada) Adrian Liu (Canada) Derrick Ng	(United States) Eva Lee (United States) Paula Lynn Obañana	(Canada) Toby Ng (Canada) Alex Bruce
2014	(Cuba) Osleni Guerrero	(Canada) Michelle Li	(Canada) Adrian Liu (Canada) Derrick Ng	(United States) Eva Lee (United States) Paula Lynn Obañana	(Canada) Toby Ng (Canada) Alex Bruce
2015	No 2015 Pan Am Badminton Championships due to 2015 Pan Am Games				
2016	(Canada) Jason Ho-Shue	(Canada) Brittney Tam	(Canada) Jason Ho-Shue (Canada) Nyl Yakura	(Canada) Michelle Tong (Canada) Josephine Wu	(Canada) Nyl Yakura (Canada) Brittney Tam
2017	(Brazil) Ygor Coelho	(Canada) Rachel Honderich	(Canada) Jason Ho-Shue (Canada) Nyl Yakura	(Canada) Michelle Tong (Canada) Josephine Wu	(Canada) Toby Ng (Canada) Rachel Honderich
2018	(Brazil) Ygor Coelho	(Canada) Michelle Li	(Canada) Jason Ho-Shue (Canada) Nyl Yakura	(Canada) Rachel Honderich (Canada) Kristen Tsai	(Canada) Ty Alexander Lindeman (Canada) Josephine Wu
2019	(Cuba) Osleni Guerrero	(Canada) Michelle Li	(Canada) Jason Ho-Shue (Canada) Nyl Yakura	(Canada) Rachel Honderich (Canada) Kristen Tsai	(Canada) Joshua Hurlburt-Yu (Canada) Josephine Wu
2020	Cancelled (Note: This tournament, originally to be played from 23 to 26 April, was later cancelled due to COVID-19 pandemic in Peru.)				
2021	(Canada) Brian Yang	(United States) Beiwen Zhang	(United States) Phillip Chew (United States) Ryan Chew	(Canada) Rachel Honderich (Canada) Kristen Tsai	(Canada) Joshua Hurlburt-Yu (Canada) Josephine Wu
2022	(Guatemala) Kevin Cordón	(Canada) Michelle Li	(Mexico) Job Castillo (Mexico) Luis Montoya	(Canada) Rachel Honderich (Canada) Kristen Tsai	(Canada) Ty Alexander Lindeman (Canada) Josephine Wu
2023	(Canada) Brian Yang	(Canada) Michelle Li	(Canada) Adam Dong (Canada) Nyl Yakura	(Canada) Catherine Choi (Canada) Josephine Wu	(Canada) Joshua Hurlburt-Yu (Canada) Rachel Honderich
2024	(Guatemala) Kevin Cordón	(United States) Beiwen Zhang	(United States) Chen Zhi-yi (United States) Presley Smith	(United States) Francesca Corbett (United States) Allison Lee	(United States) Presley Smith (United States) Allison Lee
2025	(Canada) Victor Lai	(Brazil) Juliana Viana Vieira	(United States) Chen Zhi-yi (United States) Presley Smith	(United States) Lauren Lam (United States) Allison Lee	(Canada) Ty Alexander Lindeman (Canada) Josephine Wu
2026	(Canada) Victor Lai	(Canada) Michelle Li	(United States) Chen Zhi-yi (United States) Presley Smith	(United States) Lauren Lam (United States) Allison Lee	(United States) Presley Smith (United States) Jennie Gai

== Team championships ==
=== Mixed team ===
Year	Host city	Host country	Champion	Runner-up	Score	Bronze	Results
1977	Moncton	Canada	Canada	United States	3–2	-	-
1978	Lima	Peru	Canada	Peru		-	-
1979	Mexico City	Mexico	Canada	United States	4–1	-	-
1980	San Diego	United States	United States	Canada	3–2	-	-
1987	Lima	Peru	Canada	Peru	5–0	United States	
1989	Mexico City	Mexico	Canada	United States	4–1	Peru	
1991	Kingston	Jamaica	Canada	United States	5–0	Jamaica	
1993	Guatemala City	Guatemala	Peru	Guatemala	Round robin	Mexico	
1997	Winnipeg	Canada	Canada	United States	4–1	Peru	
2001	Lima	Peru	United States	Canada	3–2	Guatemala	
2004	Lima	Peru	Canada	Peru	Round robin	United States	
2005	Bridgetown	Barbados	Canada	United States	3–2	Peru	
2007	Calgary	Canada	Canada	United States	3–1	Peru	2007 Results
2008	Lima	Peru	Canada	Peru	3–2	United States	2008 Results
2009	Guadalajara	Mexico	Canada	Peru	3–0	Mexico	2009 Results
2010	Curitiba	Brazil	Canada	United States	3–1	Peru	2010 Results
2012	Lima	Peru	Canada	United States	3–1	Brazil	2012 Results
2013	Santo Domingo	Dominican Republic	Canada	United States	3–1	Brazil	2013 Results
2014	Markham	Canada	Canada	United States	3–2	Brazil	2014 Results
2016	Campinas	Brazil	Canada	Brazil	3–2	Peru	2016 Results
2017	Santo Domingo	Dominican Republic	Canada	Brazil	3–0	United States	2017 Results
2019	Lima	Peru	Canada	United States	3–0	Brazil	2019 Results
2021	Fort McMurray	Canada	Cancelled (Note: This tournament, originally to be played from 16 to 19 February, was later cancelled due to COVID-19 pandemic in Canada.)				
2023	Guadalajara	Mexico	Canada	United States	3–0	Brazil	2023 Results
2025	Aguascalientes	Mexico	Canada	United States	3–1	Brazil	2025 Results

=== Male and Female team ===
Pan Am Male & Female Team Cup (until 2012 the Thomas & Uber Cup Pan Am qualification)

Venue		Year	Men's team			Women's team			Results
City	Country	Year	Champion	Runner-up	Score	Champion	Runner-up	Score	Results
Toronto	Canada	1984							
Vancouver	Canada	1986	South Korea			Canada			
San Jose	United States	1988							
Bridgetown	Barbados	2004	United States			Canada			
		2006	United States	Canada	3–0	United States	Canada	3–1	
Campinas	Brazil	2008	Canada	United States	3–0	United States	Canada	3–1	2008 Results
Lima	Peru	2010	Peru	Canada	3–1	United States	Peru	3–1	2010 Results
El Monte	United States	2012	United States	Guatemala	3–1	United States	Canada	3–2	2012 Results
Guadalajara	Mexico	2016	Mexico	Canada	3–0	United States	Canada	3–2	2016 Results
Tacarigua	Trinidad and Tobago	2018	Canada	United States	3–0	Canada	United States	3–0	2018 Results
Salvador	Brazil	2020	Canada	Mexico	3–1	Canada	United States	3–0	2020 Results
Acapulco	Mexico	2022	Canada	Brazil	3–2	United States	Canada	3–0	2022 Results
São Paulo	Brazil	2024	Canada	Brazil	3–0	Canada	United States	3–0	2024 Results
Guatemala City	Guatemala	2026	Canada	United States	3–1	Canada	United States	3–2	2026 Results
