= Chris Jogis =

American badminton player (born 1965)

Personal information
- Born: Hendrik Christopher Jõgis; 24 May 1965 (age 61) Palo Alto, California, United States
- Height: 1.80 m (5 ft 11 in)

Sport
- Country: United States
- Sport: Badminton
- Handedness: Left
- BWF profile
Medal record
Men's badminton
Representing United States
Pan Am Championships
Gold medal – first place	1989 Mexico City	Men's doubles
Silver medal – second place	1989 Mexico City	Men's singles
Bronze medal – third place	1987 Lima	Men's doubles
Bronze medal – third place	1991 Kingston	Men's singles
Pan Am Mixed Team Championships
Silver medal – second place	1989 Mexico City	Mixed team
Silver medal – second place	1991 Kingston	Mixed team
Bronze medal – third place	1987 Lima	Mixed team

Hendrik Christopher Jogis (Estonian: Chris Jõgis; born 24 May 1965 in Palo Alto, California) is a retired male badminton player from the United States.

== Career ==
Between 1985 and 1992 Jogis won the U.S. men's singles title six times, and shared the men's doubles title four times and the mixed doubles title twice. He won men's singles at the Swiss Open in 1986, and both singles and men's doubles at the Iceland International in 1988. Jogis was a member of the U.S. Thomas Cup teams of 1986, 1988, 1990 and 1992. He competed at the 1992 Barcelona Olympics in men's singles, losing in the second round to Teeranun Chiangta, of Thailand, 11–15, 15–3, 15–3.

== Achievements ==
=== Pan Am Championships ===
Men's singles

Year	Venue	Opponent	Score	Result
1989	Centro Deportivo Chapultepec A.C., Mexico City, Mexico	(Canada) John Goss	17–18, 10–15	Silver
1991	Convention Hall, Kingston, Jamaica	(United States) Thomas Reidy	Walkover	Bronze

Men's doubles

Year	Venue	Partner	Opponent	Score	Result
1987	Club de Regatas Lima, Lima, Peru	(United States) Benny Lee	(Canada) Mike Butler (Canada) Anil Kaul	9–15, 13–18	Bronze
1989	Centro Deportivo Chapultepec A.C., Mexico City, Mexico	(United States) Benny Lee	(Peru) Gustavo Salazar (Peru) Federico Valdez	15–7, 15–8	Gold

=== IBF International ===
Men's singles

Year	Tournament	Opponent	Score	Result
1986	Swiss Open	(Sweden) Peter Skole	15–5, 15–9	(gold) Winner
1988	Iceland International	(Iceland) Broddi Kristjánsson	15–4, 10–15, 15–13	(gold) Winner

Men's doubles

Year	Tournament	Partner	Opponent	Score	Result
1988	Iceland International	(United States) John Britton	(Iceland) Þorsteinn Páll Hængsson (Iceland) Broddi Kristjánsson	15–4, 10–15, 15–13	(gold) Winner
