= 2023 Sudirman Cup squads =

This article listed the confirmed squads for badminton's 2023 Sudirman Cup. The dates of the rankings that were stated and used to decide the ranking order for each event were based on the BWF World Ranking on 21 February 2023.

== Group A ==
=== China ===
20 players represented China.

Name	DoB/Age	Ranking of event				
Name	DoB/Age	MS	WS	MD	WD	XD
Chen Qingchen	23 June 1997 (aged 25)				1	
Chen Yufei	1 March 1998 (aged 25)		4			
Feng Yanzhe	13 February 2001 (aged 22)					16
He Bingjiao	21 March 1997 (aged 26)		5			
Huang Dongping	30 April 1995 (aged 28)					16
Huang Yaqiong	28 February 1994 (aged 29)					1
Jia Yifan	29 June 1997 (aged 25)				1	
Li Shifeng	9 January 2000 (aged 23)	20				
Liang Weikeng	30 November 2000 (aged 22)			9		
Liu Shengshu	8 April 2004 (aged 19)				162	
Liu Yuchen	25 July 1995 (aged 27)			5		
Lu Guangzu	19 October 1996 (aged 26)	10				
Ou Xuanyi	23 January 1994 (aged 29)			5		69
Shi Yuqi	28 February 1996 (aged 27)	13				
Tan Ning	3 April 2003 (aged 20)				162	
Wang Chang	7 May 2001 (aged 22)			9		
Wang Zhiyi	29 April 2000 (aged 23)		6			
Zhang Shuxian	2 January 2000 (aged 23)				3	45
Zheng Siwei	26 February 1997 (aged 26)					1
Zheng Yu	7 February 1996 (aged 27)				3	

=== Denmark ===
14 players represented Denmark. 3 players were on the reserve list.

Name	DoB/Age	Ranking of event				
Name	DoB/Age	MS	WS	MD	WD	XD
Anders Antonsen	27 April 1997 (aged 26)	18				
Kim Astrup	6 March 1992 (aged 31)			7		
Viktor Axelsen	4 January 1994 (aged 29)	1				
Mia Blichfeldt	19 August 1997 (aged 25)		23			
Alexandra Bøje	6 December 1999 (aged 23)				135	18
Mathias Christiansen	20 February 1994 (aged 29)					18
Line Christophersen	14 January 2000 (aged 23)		25			
Maiken Fruergaard	11 May 1995 (aged 28)				24	
Rasmus Gemke	11 January 1997 (aged 26)	21				
Amalie Magelund	13 May 2000 (aged 23)				135	28
Anders Skaarup Rasmussen	15 February 1989 (aged 34)			7		
Frederik Søgaard	25 July 1997 (aged 25)			40		
Sara Thygesen	20 January 1991 (aged 32)				24	
Mathias Thyrri	29 August 1997 (aged 25)			165		28
Reserve
Jeppe Bay	4 March 1997 (aged 26)			31		
Line Kjærsfeldt	20 April 1994 (aged 29)		20			
Lasse Mølhede	25 October 1993 (aged 29)			31		

=== Egypt ===
8 players represented Egypt.

Name	DoB/Age	Ranking of event				
Name	DoB/Age	MS	WS	MD	WD	XD
Nour Ahmed Youssri	17 July 2003 (aged 19)		149		130	365
Rahma El Adawy	8 January 1998 (aged 25)		399		391	476
Adham Hatem Elgamal	4 February 1998 (aged 25)	125		132		51
Kareem Ezzat	10 October 2002 (aged 20)	454		318		847
Doha Hany	10 September 1997 (aged 25)		105		130	51
Mahmoud Montaser	15 October 2001 (aged 21)	507		318		476
Ahmed Salah	30 September 1990 (aged 32)	283		132		214
Hana Tarek	4 May 1998 (aged 25)		282		299	214

=== Singapore ===
10 players represented Singapore.

Name	DoB/Age	Ranking of event				
Name	DoB/Age	MS	WS	MD	WD	XD
Grace Chua	1 March 1996 (aged 27)		286			
Terry Hee	6 July 1995 (aged 27)			30		21
Jin Yujia	6 February 1997 (aged 26)				21	113
Andy Kwek	22 April 1999 (aged 24)			105		113
Loh Kean Yew	26 June 1997 (aged 25)	8				
Loh Kean Hean	12 March 1995 (aged 28)			30		
Jessica Tan	16 July 1993 (aged 29)					21
Jason Teh	25 August 2000 (aged 22)	66				
Crystal Wong	2 August 1999 (aged 23)				21	141
Yeo Jia Min	1 February 1999 (aged 24)		36			

== Group B ==
=== Canada ===
9 players represented Canada.

Name	DoB/Age	Ranking of event				
Name	DoB/Age	MS	WS	MD	WD	XD
Catherine Choi	1 May 2001 (aged 22)		434		34	293
Adam Dong	14 February 1994 (aged 29)			45		232
Kevin Lee	10 November 1998 (aged 24)			50		232
Michelle Li	3 November 1991 (aged 31)		15			
Ty Alexander Lindeman	15 August 1997 (aged 25)			50		34
Talia Ng	6 November 2001 (aged 21)		53		240	476
Josephine Wu	20 January 1995 (aged 28)				34	34
Nyl Yakura	14 February 1993 (aged 30)			45		73
Brian Yang	25 November 2001 (aged 21)	29				

=== Indonesia ===
20 players represented Indonesia.

Name	DoB/Age	Ranking of event				
Name	DoB/Age	MS	WS	MD	WD	XD
Fajar Alfian	7 March 1995 (aged 28)			1		
Muhammad Rian Ardianto	13 February 1996 (aged 27)			1		
Leo Rolly Carnando	29 July 2001 (aged 21)			11		
Jonatan Christie	15 September 1997 (aged 25)	2				
Dejan Ferdinansyah	21 January 2000 (aged 23)					17
Marcus Fernaldi Gideon	9 March 1991 (aged 32)			19		
Anthony Sinisuka Ginting	20 October 1996 (aged 26)	3				
Daniel Marthin	31 July 2001 (aged 21)			11		
Nita Violina Marwah	25 March 2001 (aged 22)					96
Adnan Maulana	23 October 1999 (aged 23)					96
Lanny Tria Mayasari	8 May 2002 (aged 21)				45	
Pitha Haningtyas Mentari	1 July 1999 (aged 23)					9
Apriyani Rahayu	29 April 1998 (aged 25)				5	
Siti Fadia Silva Ramadhanti	16 November 2000 (aged 22)				5	
Rinov Rivaldy	12 November 1999 (aged 23)					9
Ribka Sugiarto	22 January 2000 (aged 23)				45	
Kevin Sanjaya Sukamuljo	2 August 1995 (aged 27)			19		
Gregoria Mariska Tunjung	11 August 1999 (aged 23)		14			
Putri Kusuma Wardani	20 July 2002 (aged 20)		40			
Gloria Emanuelle Widjaja	28 December 1993 (aged 29)					17

=== Germany ===
13 players represented Germany.

Name	DoB/Age	Ranking of event				
Name	DoB/Age	MS	WS	MD	WD	XD
Malik Bourakkadi	7 April 2003 (aged 20)			391		171
Linda Efler	23 January 1995 (aged 28)				20	27
Jones Ralfy Jansen	28 April 1992 (aged 31)			75		27
Stine Küspert	24 July 1999 (aged 23)				43	70
Mark Lamsfuß	19 April 1994 (aged 29)			15		7
Yvonne Li	30 May 1998 (aged 24)		29		176	
Isabel Lohau	17 March 1992 (aged 31)				20	7
Emma Moszczynski	7 June 2001 (aged 21)				43	386
Fabian Roth	29 November 1995 (aged 27)	97				
Kai Schäfer	13 June 1993 (aged 29)	64				
Antonia Schaller	24 January 2004 (aged 19)		458		498	
Marvin Seidel	9 November 1995 (aged 27)			15		
Miranda Wilson	6 April 2000 (aged 23)		182			

=== Thailand ===
15 players represented Thailand. 3 players were on the reserve list.

Name	DoB/Age	Ranking of event				
Name	DoB/Age	MS	WS	MD	WD	XD
Benyapa Aimsaard	29 August 2002 (aged 20)				10	
Nuntakarn Aimsaard	23 May 1999 (aged 23)				10	
Pornpawee Chochuwong	22 January 1998 (aged 25)		11			
Ratchanok Intanon	5 February 1995 (aged 28)		8			
Jongkolphan Kititharakul	1 March 1993 (aged 30)				8	
Supak Jomkoh	4 September 1996 (aged 26)			32		12
Pharanyu Kaosamaang	6 March 2003 (aged 20)			63		
Kittinupong Kedren	19 July 1996 (aged 26)			32		
Supissara Paewsampran	18 November 1999 (aged 23)				23	12
Rawinda Prajongjai	29 June 1993 (aged 29)				8	
Dechapol Puavaranukroh	20 May 1997 (aged 25)					4
Sapsiree Taerattanachai	18 April 1992 (aged 31)					4
Sitthikom Thammasin	7 April 1995 (aged 28)	33				
Worrapol Thongsa-Nga	29 October 1995 (aged 27)			63		
Kunlavut Vitidsarn	11 May 2001 (aged 22)	7				
Reserve
Busanan Ongbamrungphan	22 March 1996 (aged 27)		12			
Puttita Supajirakul	29 March 1996 (aged 27)				23	
Kantaphon Wangcharoen	18 September 1998 (aged 24)	30				

== Group C ==
=== Australia ===
10 players represented Australia.

Name	DoB/Age	Ranking of event				
Name	DoB/Age	MS	WS	MD	WD	XD
Kenneth Choo	1 April 1997 (aged 26)			147		94
Kaitlyn Ea	25 June 2003 (aged 19)				182	296
Sydney Go	11 June 2004 (aged 18)		386		319	
Tiffany Ho	6 January 1998 (aged 25)		121		164	
Gronya Somerville	10 May 1995 (aged 28)				102	94
Nathan Tang	26 August 1990 (aged 32)	144		211		
Ricky Tang	6 April 2000 (aged 23)	312		305		296
Rayne Wang	17 January 2003 (aged 20)			220		285
Angela Yu	8 March 2003 (aged 20)				182	285
Jack Yu	13 September 2004 (aged 18)	300		298		586

=== Chinese Taipei ===
15 players represented Chinese Taipei.

Name	DoB/Age	Ranking of event				
Name	DoB/Age	MS	WS	MD	WD	XD
Chou Tien-chen	8 January 1990 (aged 33)	5				
Hsu Wen-chi	28 September 1997 (aged 25)		16			
Hsu Ya-ching	30 July 1991 (aged 31)				38	44
Hu Ling-fang	6 April 1998 (aged 25)				69	35
Lee Chia-hsin	14 May 1997 (aged 26)				29	25
Lee Yang	12 August 1995 (aged 27)			17		
Lin Wan-ching	1 November 1995 (aged 27)				38	
Lu Ching-yao	7 June 1993 (aged 29)			14		
Tai Tzu-ying	20 June 1994 (aged 28)		3			
Teng Chun-hsun	27 September 2000 (aged 22)				29	
Wang Chi-lin	18 January 1995 (aged 28)			17		
Wang Tzu-wei	27 February 1995 (aged 28)	24				
Yang Po-han	13 March 1994 (aged 29)			14		
Yang Po-hsuan	23 August 1996 (aged 26)			28		35
Ye Hong-wei	1 November 1999 (aged 23)			34		25

=== India ===
13 players represented India. 2 players were on the reserve list.

Name	DoB/Age	Ranking of event				
Name	DoB/Age	MS	WS	MD	WD	XD
Tanisha Crasto	5 May 2003 (aged 20)				141	26
Gayatri Gopichand	4 March 2003 (aged 20)				18	
Treesa Jolly	27 May 2003 (aged 19)				18	
Dhruv Kapila	1 February 2000 (aged 23)			24		
Srikanth Kidambi	7 February 1993 (aged 30)	19				
Ashwini Ponnappa	18 September 1989 (aged 33)				141	82
Sai Pratheek K.	3 May 2000 (aged 23)			53		264
Arjun M. R.	11 May 1997 (aged 26)			24		
Satwiksairaj Rankireddy	13 August 2000 (aged 22)			6		
Prannoy H. S.	17 July 1992 (aged 30)	9				
Chirag Shetty	4 July 1997 (aged 25)			6		
P. V. Sindhu	5 July 1995 (aged 27)		9			
Anupama Upadhyaya	12 February 2005 (aged 18)		62			
Reserve
Aakarshi Kashyap	24 August 2001 (aged 21)		42			
Lakshya Sen	16 August 2001 (aged 21)	12				

=== Malaysia ===
20 players represented Malaysia.

Name	DoB/Age	Ranking of event				
Name	DoB/Age	MS	WS	MD	WD	XD
Chen Tang Jie	5 January 1998 (aged 25)					43
Aaron Chia	24 February 1997 (aged 26)			2		
Go Pei Kee	18 April 2002 (aged 20)				70	228
Goh Jin Wei	30 January 2000 (aged 23)		31			
Goh Soon Huat	27 June 1990 (aged 32)					8
Hoo Pang Ron	29 March 1998 (aged 25)					67
Lai Pei Jing	8 August 1992 (aged 30)					6
Shevon Jamie Lai	8 August 1993 (aged 29)					8
Lee Zii Jia	29 March 1998 (aged 25)	4				
Letshanaa Karupathevan	19 August 2003 (aged 19)		112			
Thinaah Muralitharan	3 January 1998 (aged 25)				6	
Ng Tze Yong	16 May 2000 (aged 22)	28				
Ong Yew Sin	30 January 1995 (aged 28)			8		
Valeree Siow	18 March 2002 (aged 21)				53	59
Soh Wooi Yik	17 February 1998 (aged 25)			2		
Tan Kian Meng	1 June 1994 (aged 28)					6
Pearly Tan	14 March 2000 (aged 23)				6	
Teo Ee Yi	4 April 1993 (aged 30)			8		
Teoh Mei Xing	6 March 1997 (aged 26)				70	67
Toh Ee Wei	18 September 2000 (aged 22)					43

== Group D ==
=== England ===
10 players represented England.

Name	DoB/Age	Ranking of event				
Name	DoB/Age	MS	WS	MD	WD	XD
Chloe Birch	16 September 1995 (aged 27)				66	132
Lisa Curtin	2 August 2004 (aged 18)		539		319	
Nadeem Dalvi	1 September 2004 (aged 18)	649				
Marcus Ellis	14 September 1989 (aged 33)					46
Cholan Kayan	6 March 2003 (aged 20)	217		612		
Ben Lane	13 July 1997 (aged 25)			18		
Freya Redfearn	12 November 2000 (aged 22)		174			
Lauren Smith	26 September 1991 (aged 31)				66	46
Estelle van Leeuwen	1 November 2004 (aged 18)		406		243	148
Sean Vendy	18 May 1996 (aged 26)			18		

=== France ===
11 players represented France.

Name	DoB/Age	Ranking of event				
Name	DoB/Age	MS	WS	MD	WD	XD
Lucas Corvée	9 June 1993 (aged 29)			36		60
Delphine Delrue	6 November 1998 (aged 24)					5
Thom Gicquel	12 January 1999 (aged 24)					5
Léonice Huet	21 May 2000 (aged 22)		50			
Ronan Labar	3 May 1989 (aged 34)			36		
Margot Lambert	15 March 1999 (aged 24)				30	
Alex Lanier	26 January 2005 (aged 18)	68				
Christo Popov	8 March 2002 (aged 21)	42		33		
Toma Junior Popov	29 September 1998 (aged 24)	25		33		
Qi Xuefei	28 February 1992 (aged 31)		44			
Anne Tran	27 April 1996 (aged 27)				30	42

=== Japan ===
19 players represented Japan.

Name	DoB/Age	Ranking of event				
Name	DoB/Age	MS	WS	MD	WD	XD
Yuki Fukushima	6 May 1993 (aged 30)				9	
Arisa Higashino	1 August 1996 (aged 26)					2
Sayaka Hirota	1 August 1994 (aged 28)				9	
Takuro Hoki	14 August 1995 (aged 27)			4		
Saena Kawakami	5 December 1997 (aged 25)		26			
Yugo Kobayashi	10 July 1995 (aged 27)			4		
Akira Koga	8 March 1994 (aged 29)			25		
Mayu Matsumoto	7 August 1995 (aged 27)				11	
Nami Matsuyama	28 June 1998 (aged 24)				2	
Wakana Nagahara	9 January 1996 (aged 27)				11	
Kodai Naraoka	30 June 2001 (aged 21)	6				
Kenta Nishimoto	30 August 1994 (aged 28)	14				
Taichi Saito	21 April 1993 (aged 30)			25		
Chiharu Shida	29 April 1997 (aged 26)				2	
Naru Shinoya	18 March 1994 (aged 29)					19
Kanta Tsuneyama	21 June 1996 (aged 26)	16				
Yuta Watanabe	13 June 1997 (aged 25)					2
Akane Yamaguchi	6 June 1997 (aged 25)		1			
Kyohei Yamashita	12 October 1998 (aged 24)					19

=== South Korea ===
16 players represented South Korea.

Name	DoB/Age	Ranking of event				
Name	DoB/Age	MS	WS	MD	WD	XD
An Se-young	5 February 2002 (aged 21)		2			
Baek Ha-na	22 September 2000 (aged 22)				32	
Chae Yoo-jung	9 May 1995 (aged 28)					10
Choi Sol-gyu	5 August 1995 (aged 27)			10		
Jeon Hyeok-jin	13 June 1995 (aged 27)	55				
Jeong Na-eun	27 June 2000 (aged 22)				4	14
Kang Min-hyuk	17 February 1999 (aged 24)			16		
Kim Ga-eun	7 February 1998 (aged 25)		21			
Kim Hye-jeong	3 January 1998 (aged 25)				4	
Kim So-yeong	9 July 1992 (aged 30)				7	
Kim Won-ho	2 June 1999 (aged 23)			10		14
Kong Hee-yong	11 December 1996 (aged 26)				7	
Lee So-hee	14 June 1994 (aged 28)				32	
Lee Yun-gyu	1 November 1997 (aged 25)	208				
Na Sung-seung	28 August 1999 (aged 23)			64		115
Seo Seung-jae	4 September 1997 (aged 25)			16		10
