= 1978 Pan Am Badminton Championships =

Tournament details
- Dates: 19 April 1978 – 23 April 1978
- Nations: 5
- Venue: Peru National Badminton Stadium
- Location: Lima, Peru

Champions
- Men's singles: (Canada) Jamie McKee
- Women's singles: (Canada) Johanne Falardeau
- Men's doubles: (Canada) Greg Carter (Canada) Jamie McKee
- Women's doubles: (Canada) Wendy Clarkson (Canada) Johanne Falardeau
- Mixed doubles: (Canada) Greg Carter (Canada) Wendy Clarkson

The 1978 Pan Am Badminton Championships (Spanish: Campeonato Panamericano de Bádminton 1978) was the second edition of the Pan American Badminton Championships. The tournament was held from 19 to 23 April 1978 at the Peru National Badminton Stadium in Lima, Peru. Five countries took part in the event, which were Canada, Jamaica, Mexico, Peru and Venezuela.

The United States whom originally planned to compete in the tournament later withdrew due to funding issues. Following the United States' withdrawal, only two countries competed for the Devlin Cup, also known as the mixed team championships. Canada defeated Peru in the final to retain their mixed team title.

Canada finished top on the medal table. Wendy Clarkson could not defend her women's singles title after losing in the final to 17-year-old Johanne Falardeau.

== Medal summary ==
=== Medalists ===
Event	Gold	Silver	Bronze
Men's singles	(Canada) Jamie McKee	(Mexico) Victor Jaramillo	(Canada) Paul Johnson
Men's singles	(Canada) Jamie McKee	(Mexico) Victor Jaramillo	(Canada) Greg Carter
Women's singles	(Canada) Johanne Falardeau	(Canada) Wendy Clarkson	(Canada) Claire Backhouse
Women's singles	(Canada) Johanne Falardeau	(Canada) Wendy Clarkson	(Canada) Jane Youngberg
Men's doubles	(Canada) Greg Carter (Canada) Jamie McKee	(Canada) Ian Johnson (Canada) Pat Tryon	(Mexico) Ricardo de la Torre (Mexico) Jorge Palazuelos
Men's doubles	(Canada) Greg Carter (Canada) Jamie McKee	(Canada) Ian Johnson (Canada) Pat Tryon	(Mexico) Ricardo Jaramillo (Mexico) Victor Jaramillo
Women's doubles	(Canada) Wendy Clarkson (Canada) Johanne Falardeau	(Canada) Claire Backhouse (Canada) Jane Youngberg	(Peru) Josefina de Salazar (Peru) Finita Salazar
Women's doubles	(Canada) Wendy Clarkson (Canada) Johanne Falardeau	(Canada) Claire Backhouse (Canada) Jane Youngberg	(Peru) Ofelia de Telge (Peru) Malena Noriega
Mixed doubles	(Canada) Greg Carter (Canada) Wendy Clarkson	(Canada) Jamie McKee (Canada) Johanne Falardeau	(Canada) Pat Tryon (Canada) Claire Backhouse
Mixed doubles	(Canada) Greg Carter (Canada) Wendy Clarkson	(Canada) Jamie McKee (Canada) Johanne Falardeau	(Canada) Ian Johnson (Canada) Jane Youngberg
Mixed team (Devlin Cup)	Canada	Peru	Not awarded

=== Medal table ===
* Host nation (Peru)

Rank	Nation	Gold	Silver	Bronze	Total
1	Canada (CAN)	6	4	6	16
2	Mexico (MEX)	0	1	2	3
2	Peru (PER)*	0	1	2	3
Totals (3 entries)		6	6	10	22
