= Bryan Blanshard =

Canadian badminton player (born 1966)

J. Bryan Blanshard

Personal information
- Country: Canada
- Born: 28 January 1966 (age 59); Toronto, Ontario, Canada
- Height: 1.73 m (5 ft 8 in)
- Handedness: Right
Medal record
Men's badminton
Representing Canada
Commonwealth Games
Silver medal – second place	1990 Auckland	Mixed team
Bronze medal – third place	1990 Auckland	Men's doubles
Pan American Championships
Gold medal – first place	1991 Kingston	Men's doubles
Silver medal – second place	1991 Kingston	Men's singles
- BWF profile

Bryan Blanshard (born 28 January 1966) is a Canadian badminton player. He competed in two events at the 1992 Summer Olympics.
