= Mike Bitten =

Canadian badminton player (born 1962)

Personal information
- Born: 2 June 1962 (age 64) Senneterre, Quebec, Canada
- Height: 1.8 m (5 ft 11 in)
- Spouse: Doris Piché

Sport
- Country: Canada
- Sport: Badminton
- Handedness: Right
- BWF profile
Medal record
Men's badminton
Representing Canada
Commonwealth Games
Silver medal – second place	1990 Auckland	Mixed team
Bronze medal – third place	1990 Auckland	Men's doubles
Pan American Championships
Gold medal – first place	1991 Kingston	Men's doubles

Mike Bitten (born 2 June 1962) is a Canadian badminton player. He competed in the men's doubles tournament at the 1992 Summer Olympics.

== Personal life ==
Bitten and his wife Doris Piché have two sons together, one of whom is hockey player William Bitten.
