= José Antonio Crespo =

Spanish badminton player (born 1977)

Personal information
- Born: José Antonio Crespo Ortiz; 24 June 1977 (age 49) Madrid, Spain
- Height: 1.80 m (5 ft 11 in)
- Weight: 80 kg (176 lb)

Sport
- Country: Spain
- Sport: Badminton
- Handedness: Right

Men's & mixed doubles
- Highest ranking: 13 (MD) July 2003; 15 (XD) June 2002
- BWF profile

José Antonio Crespo Ortiz (Note: In this Spanish name, the first or paternal surname is Crespo and the second or maternal family name is Ortiz.) (born 24 June 1977 in Madrid) is a badminton player from Spain.

== Career ==
Crespo started playing badminton when he was eight in Benalmádena under coached Antonio Lopez, and when he was nine, he won the local tournament in San Juan. In 1991, he competed in the national tournament in Gandia, and won the U-15 boys' doubles title with his partner Jose Luis Ortiz. He was the champion in the boys' doubles event at the U-19 Spanish Junior National Championships in 1994 and 1995. Crespo also won the National senior title 11 times from 2001 to 2008, 3 in the singles event, 6 in the men's doubles, and 2 in the men's doubles event. Crespo competed at the Athens 2004 Summer Olympics in the men's doubles event with partner Llopis. They were defeated in the round of 32 by Lee Dong-soo and Yoo Yong-sung of Korea. Throughout his career, he had been ranked 13 in the men's doubles event with Sergio Llopis in 2003, and ranked 15 in the mixed doubles with Dolores Marco in 2002. He has a Bachelor of Science degree in Sports and Physical Activity at the Technical University of Madrid.

== Achievements ==
=== IBF World Grand Prix ===
The World Badminton Grand Prix sanctioned by International Badminton Federation (IBF) since 1983.

Men's doubles
Year	Tournament	Partner	Opponent	Score	Result
2002	Puerto Rico Open	(Spain) Sergio Llopis	(Indonesia) Tony Gunawan (United States) Khankham Malaythong	6–15, 3–15	(silver) Runner-up

=== BWF International Challenge/Series ===
Men's singles
Year	Tournament	Opponent	Score	Result
2007	Puerto Rico International	(Peru) Andrés Corpancho	16–21, 21–14, 21–16	(gold) Winner
2008	Kenya International	(India) Chetan Anand	14–21, 7–21	(silver) Runner-up

Men's doubles
Year	Tournament	Partner	Opponent	Score	Result
1999	Portugal International	(Spain) Sergio Llopis	(France) Manuel Dubrulle (France) Vincent Laigle	3–15, 15–10, 9–15	(silver) Runner-up
2000	Cuba International	(Spain) Sergio Llopis	(Japan) Keita Masuda (Japan) Tadashi Ōtsuka	9–15, 2–15	(silver) Runner-up
2000	Hungarian International	(Spain) Sergio Llopis	(India) Valiyaveetil Diju (India) Sanave Thomas	14–17, 7–15	(silver) Runner-up
2001	Spanish International	(Spain) Sergio Llopis	(Poland) Michał Łogosz (Poland) Robert Mateusiak	3–15, 10–15	(silver) Runner-up
2002	Slovenian International	(Spain) Sergio Llopis	(Denmark) Rasmus Andersen (Denmark) Carsten Mogensen	4–15, 7–15	(silver) Runner-up
2003	Peru International	(Spain) Sergio Llopis	(Canada) Keith Chan (Canada) William Milroy	15–13, 12–15, 15–10	(gold) Winner
2003	Dominican Republic International	(Spain) Sergio Llopis	(France) Vincent Laigle (France) Svetoslav Stoyanov	15–8, 7–15, 12–15	(silver) Runner-up
2003	Brazil International	(Spain) Sergio Llopis	(United States) Howard Bach (United States) Kevin Han	6–15, 15–11, 15–10	(gold) Winner
2003	Southern Pan Am International	(Spain) Sergio Llopis	(Canada) Philippe Bourret (Canada) Jean Philippe Goyette		(gold) Winner
2004	Dutch International	(Spain) Sergio Llopis	(France) Jean-Michel Lefort (France) Svetoslav Stoyanov	9–15, 9–15	(silver) Runner-up
2005	Peru International	(Spain) Nicolás Escartín	(Japan) Keishi Kawaguchi (Japan) Tōru Matsumoto	7–15, 3–15	(silver) Runner-up
2005	Giraldilla International	(Spain) Nicolás Escartín	(Italy) Klaus Raffeiner (Italy) Alexander Theiner	15–10, 15–4	(gold) Winner
2008	Peru International	(Peru) Francisco Ugaz	(Peru) Andrés Corpancho (Peru) Rodrigo Pacheco	21–15, 21–15	(gold) Winner
2008	Miami Pan Am International	(Brazil) Guilherme Pardo	(United States) Daniel Gouw (United States) Chandra Kowi	21–19, 13–21, 14–21	(silver) Runner-up

Mixed doubles
Year	Tournament	Partner	Opponent	Score	Result
1998	Slovenian International	(Spain) Dolores Marco	(Slovenia) Andrej Pohar (Slovenia) Maja Pohar	2–15, 15–11, 8–15	(silver) Runner-up
1999	Argentina International	(Spain) Dolores Marco	(Portugal) Hugo Rodrigues (Portugal) Ana Ferreira	16–17, 10–15	(silver) Runner-up
1999	Guatemala International	(Spain) Dolores Marco	(Canada) Mike Beres (Canada) Kara Solmundson	12–15, 15–10, 15–10	(gold) Winner
2000	Chile International	(Spain) Dolores Marco	(Canada) Mike Beres (Canada) Kara Solmundson	9–15, 10–15	(silver) Runner-up
2000	Hungarian International	(Spain) Dolores Marco	(Spain) Sergio Llopis (Spain) Mercedes Cuenca	15–1, 15–7	(gold) Winner
2002	Spanish International	(Spain) Dolores Marco	(Scotland) Graeme Smith (Scotland) Kirsteen McEwan	2–7, 8–7, 6–8	(silver) Runner-up
2003	Peru International	(Spain) Dolores Marco	(Wales) Matthew Hughes (England) Joanne Muggeridge	2–15, 13–15	(silver) Runner-up
2003	Dominican Republic International	(Spain) Dolores Marco	(Canada) Philippe Bourret (Canada) Denyse Julien	15–4, 17–15	(gold) Winner
2003	Brazil International	(Spain) Dolores Marco	(Wales) Matthew Hughes (Wales) Joanne Muggeridge	12–15, 15–13, 15–13	(gold) Winner
2004	Spanish International	(Spain) Dolores Marco	(Spain) Vicente Ortgosa (Spain) Alicia Calonge		(gold) Winner
2005	Miami PanAm International	(Spain) Yoana Martínez	(Canada) Mike Beres (Canada) Jody Patrick	11–15, 10–15	(silver) Runner-up
2005	Giraldilla International	(Spain) Yoana Martínez	(Canada) Philippe Bourret (Canada) Helen Nichol	15–5, 15–5	(gold) Winner
2006	Waikato International	(Peru) Doriana Rivera	(New Zealand) Craig Cooper (New Zealand) Renee Flavell	17–21, 18–21	(silver) Runner-up

BWF International Challenge tournament
BWF International Series tournament
BWF Future Series tournament
