= Italian National Badminton Championships =

Campionati Italiani Assoluti di Badminton
- Current season, competition or edition: 2020
- Sport: Badminton
- Founded: 1977
- No. of teams: 10 (Serie A)
- Country: Italy
- Most recent champion: BC Milano (Milan)
- Most titles: SC Meran (Meran, Bolzano)
- Website: http://badmintonitalia.it/

The Italian National Badminton Championships is a tournament organized to crown the best badminton players in Italy. The tournament started in 1977.

Since 1985 the championship also assigns the teams national title.

== History ==
The Federazione Italiana Badminton (FIBa) (Italian Badminton Federation), was founded on 23 March 1985, for the transformation of the Associazione Italiana Badminton (Italian Badminton Association), which arose in 1976 and became the National Sports Federation – FSN recognized by Italian National Olympic Committee (CONI) in 2000.

It is affiliated to the Badminton World Federation (BWF) and Badminton Europe (BE) of which it recognizes, accepts and applies the regulations and from which it is recognized as the only representative of Badminton in Italy.

== Past winners ==
Year	Men's singles	Women's singles	Men's doubles	Women's doubles	Mixed doubles	Team
1977	Kurt Duschek	Barbara Baker	Kurt Duschek; Karl Klammsteiner	Margitt Grittner; Rita Blaas	Kurt Duschek; Rita Blaas	not disputed
1978	Paolo de Paoli	Wally Raffeiner	Paolo de Paoli; Hubert Grittner	Margit Grittner; Wally Raffeiner	Hubert Grittner; Margit Grittner	not disputed
1979	Paolo de Paoli	Margit Grittner	Hubert Grittner; Karl Klammsteiner	Rita Tischler; V. Egger	Paolo de Paoli; T. Roncalli	not disputed
1980	Paoli de Paoli	Rita Tischler	Paolo de Paoli; E. Perolari	Christine Klotzner; Resi Klotzner	Karl Klammsteiner; Christine Klotzner	not disputed
1981	Paolo de Paoli	Christine Klotzner	Hubert Grittner; Karl Klammsteiner	Christine Klotzner; Resi Klotzner	Kurt Duschek; Christine Klotzner	not disputed
1982	Paolo de Paoli	Charlotte Punter	Andrea Ortner; S. Faccioli	Christine Klotzner; Resi Klotzner	S. Faccioli; Margit Grittner	not disputed
1983	Paolo de Paoli	Christine Klotzner	Kurt Duschek; S. Faccioli	Christine Klotzner; Resi Klotzner	S. Faccioli; Christine Klotzner	not disputed
1984	Kurt Salutt	Christine Klotzner	Kurt Duschek; Andrea Ortner	Claudia Nista; Eva Stecher	Andrea Ortner; Christie Klotzner	not disputed
1985	Kurt Salutt	Christine Klotzner	Andrea Ortner; S. Faccioli	Claudia Nista; Eva Stecher	Kurt Salutt; Claudia Nista	SC Meran (Meran, Bolzano)
1986	Kurt Salutt	Christine Klotzner	Anton Klotzner; Karl Freund	Claudia Nista; Eva Stecher	Kurt Salutt; Claudia Nista	ASV Malles (Mals, Bolzano)
1987	Kurt Salutt	Claudia Nista	Claus Ring; Pier Carlo Barioli	Claudia Nista; Eva Stecher	Kurt Salutt; Claudia Nista	ASV Malles (Mals, Bolzano)
1988	Stefan Kantioler	Claudia Nista	Kurt Salutt; Karl Prugger	Claudia Nista; Maria Luisa Mur	Kurt Salutt; Claudia Nista	ASV Malles (Mals, Bolzano)
1989	Anton Klotzner	Marie Luisa Mur	Giorgio Bianchi; Kurt Salutt	Claudia Nista; Maria Luisa Mur	Kurt Salutt; Claudia Nista	SC Meran (Meran, Bolzano)
1990	Anton Klotzner	Petra Schrott	Giorgio Bianchi; Kurt Salutt	Petra Schrott; Tanja Egger	Roland Osele; Petra Schrott	SSV Brixen (Brixen, Bolzano)
1991	Anton Klotzner	Petra Schrott	Giorgio Bianchi; Kurt Salutt	Petra Schrott; Tanja Egger	Kurt Salutt; Claudia Nista	SC Meran (Meran, Bolzano)
1992	Anton Klotzner	Petra Schrott	Andreas Pichler; Anton Klotzner	Petra Schrott; Tanja Egger	Anton Klotzner; Petra Schrott	SC Meran (Meran, Bolzano)
1993	Andreas Pichler	Petra Schrott	Jochen Pichler; Alexander Rieder	Petra Schrott; Tanja Egger	Anton Klotzner; Claudia Nista	SC Meran (Meran, Bolzano)
1994	Andreas Pichler	Beate Dejaco	Andreas Pichler; Jochen Pichler	Claudia Nista; Maria Luisa Mur	Enrico La Rosa; Maria Luisa Mur	SC Meran (Meran, Bolzano)
1995	Gianmarco La Rosa	Beate Dejaco	Luigi Izzo; Enrico La Rosa	Claudia Nista; Maria Luisa Mur	Klaus Raffeiner; Thea Gotsch	SC Meran (Meran, Bolzano)
1996	Klaus Raffeiner	Beate Dejaco	Klaus Raffeiner; Alexander Theiner	Monica Memoli; Maria Luisa Mur	Gianmarco La Rosa; Monica Memoli	SC Meran (Meran, Bolzano)
1997	Klaus Raffeiner	Monica Memoli	Klaus Raffeiner; Alexander Theiner	Monica Memoli; Maria Luisa Mur	Alexander Theiner; Monica Memoli	SC Meran (Meran, Bolzano)
1998	Klaus Raffeiner	Petra Schrott	Klaus Raffeiner; Alexander Theiner	Monica Memoli; Maria Luisa Mur	Andreas Pichler; Petra Schrott	SC Meran (Meran, Bolzano)
1999	Klaus Raffeiner	Petra Schrott	Klaus Raffeiner; Alexander Theiner	Monica Memoli; Maria Luisa Mur	Simone Vincenti; Maria Luisa Mur	SC Meran (Meran, Bolzano)
2000	Klaus Raffeiner	Erika Henriete Stich	Klaus Raffeiner; Alexander Theiner	Agnese Allegrini; Maria Luisa Mur	Klaus Raffeiner; Petra Schrott	SC Meran (Meran, Bolzano)
2001	Klaus Raffeiner	Agnese Allegrini	Klaus Raffeiner; Alexander Theiner	Agnese Allegrini; Erika Henriete Stich	Klaus Raffeiner; Petra Schrott	Aqui Badminton (Acqui Terme, Alessandria)
2002	Klaus Raffeiner	Agnese Allegrini	Cristiano Bevilacqua; Christian Bernhard	Monica Memoli; Maria Luisa Mur	Klaus Raffeiner; Petra Schrott	Aqui Badminton (Acqui Terme, Alessandria)
2003	Klaus Raffeiner	Agnese Allegrini	Cristiano Bevilacqua; Christian Bernhard	Agnese Allegrini; Federica Panini	Klaus Raffeiner; Petra Schrott	Aqui Badminton (Acqui Terme, Alessandria)
2004	Klaus Raffeiner	Monica Memoli	Klaus Raffeiner; Alexander Theiner	Monica Memoli; Maria Luisa Mur	Klaus Raffeiner; Petra Schrott	SC Meran (Meran, Bolzano)
2005	Klaus Raffeiner	Erika Stich	Klaus Raffeiner; Alexander Theiner	Federica Panini; Erika Stich	Giovanni Traina; Federica Panini	Mediterranea Cinisi (Cinisi, Palermo)
2006	Klaus Raffeiner	Monica Memoli	Klaus Raffeiner; Alexander Theiner	Verena Leiter; Maria Luise Mur	Klaus Raffeiner; Maria Luise Mur	Mediterranea Cinisi (Cinisi, Palermo)
2007	Giovanni Greco	Verena Leiter	Rosario Maddaloni; Enrico Galeani	Verena Leiter; Maria Luise Mur	Giovanni Traina; Federica Panini	Mediterranea Cinisi (Cinisi, Palermo)
2008	Marco Mondavio	Elena Chepurnova	Luigi Izzo; Giovanni Traina	Verena Leiter; Maria Luise Mur	Enrico Galeani; Maria Luise Mur	Mediterranea Cinisi (Cinisi, Palermo)
2009	Giovanni Greco	Elena Chepurnova	Luigi Izzo; Giovanni Traina	Federica Panini; Erika Stich	Giovanni Traina; Federica Panini	Mediterranea Cinisi (Cinisi, Palermo)
2010	Rosario Maddaloni	Federica Panini	Giovanni Greco; Pierluigi Musiari	Federica Panini; Erika Stich	Giovanni Traina; Federica Panini	Mediterranea Cinisi (Cinisi, Palermo)
2011	Giovanni Greco	Agnese Allegrini	Giacomo Battaglino; Marco Mondavio	Federica Panini; Erika Stich	Giovanni Traina; Federica Panini	Mediterranea Cinisi (Cinisi, Palermo)
2012	Giovanni Greco	Agnese Allegrini	Giacomo Battaglino; Marco Mondavio	Hannah Strobl; Carmen Thanei	Enrico Galeani; Agnese Allegrini	Mediterranea Cinisi (Cinisi, Palermo)
2013	Giovanni Greco	Agnese Allegrini	Rosario Maddaloni; Enrico Galeani	Hannah Strobl; Marah Punter	Enrico Galeani; Agnese Allegrini	Mediterranea Cinisi (Cinisi, Palermo)
2014	Rosario Maddaloni	Xandra Stelling	Rosario Maddaloni; Enrico Galeani	Monica Memoli; Maria Luisa Mur	Pirmin Klotzner; Karin Maran	BC Milano (Milan)
2015	Rosario Maddaloni	Jeanine Cicognini	Giovanni Greco; Rosario Maddaloni	Monica Memoli; Maria Luisa Mur	Pirmin Klotzner; Karin Maran	BC Milano (Milan)
2016	Rosario Maddaloni	Jeanine Cicognini	Giovanni Greco; Rosario Maddaloni	Claudia Gruber; Gloria Pirvanescu	Fabio Caponio; Sofia Giudici	BC Milano (Milan)
2017	Rosario Maddaloni	Jeanine Cicognini	Giovanni Greco; Rosario Maddaloni	Silvia Garino; Lisa Iversen	Rosario Maddaloni; Jeanine Cicognini	BC Milano (Milan)
2018	Rosario Maddaloni	Katharina Fink	Lukas Osele; Kevin Strobl	Silvia Garino; Lisa Iversen	Rosario Maddaloni; Jeanine Cicognini	BC Milano (Milan)
2019	Rosario Maddaloni	Yasmine Hamza	Giovanni Greco; Rosario Maddaloni	Judith Mair; Lisa Sagmeister	Kevin Strobl; Silvia Garino	BC Milano (Milan)
2020	No competition					BC Milano
2021	Giovanni Toti	Yasmine Hamza	Giovanni Greco; Kevin Strobl	Martina Corsini; Judith Mair	Gianmarco Bailetti; Martina Corsini	GSA Chiari
2022	Christopher Vittoriani	Yasmine Hamza	Giovanni Greco; David Salutt	Martina Corsini; Judith Mair	Christopher Vittoriani; Yasmine Hamza	ASV Mals
2023	Christopher Vittoriani	Judith Mair	Giovanni Greco; David Salutt	Martina Corsini; Judith Mair	David Salutt; Chiara Passeri	ASV Mals
2024	Christopher Vittoriani	Emma Piccinin	Alessandro Gozzini; Luca Zhou	Martina Corsini; Emma Piccinin	Gianmarco Bailetti; Emma Piccinin	BC Milano
2025	Fabio Caponio	Gianna Stiglich	Gianmarco Bailetti; Simone Piccinin	Martina Corsini; Emma Piccinin	Gianmarco Bailetti; Emma Piccinin	CS Aeronautica Militare

== Champions teams ==
Club	City	Titles
SC Meran	Meran, Bolzano	13
Mediterranea Cinisi	Cinisi, Palermo	9
BC Milano	Milan	6
ASV Malles	Mals, Bolzano	3
Aqui Badminton	Acqui Terme, Alessandria	3
SSV Brixen	Brixen, Bolzano	1
