= Spanish National Badminton Championships =

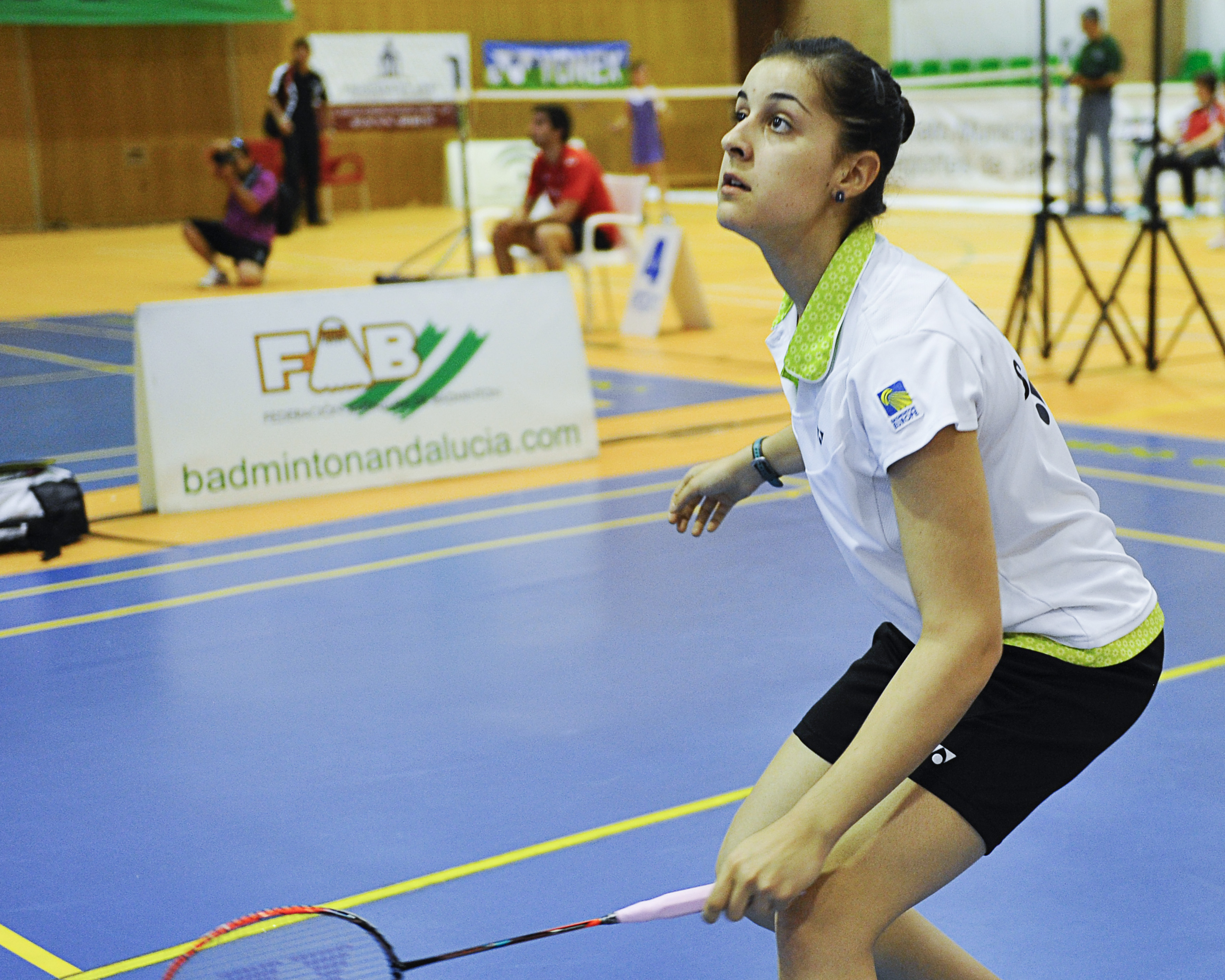
Wiki carolina marin

The Spanish National Badminton Championships is a tournament organized by the Federación Española de Bádminton to crown the best badminton players in Spain.

The tournament started in 1982 and is held every year.

== Past winners ==
Year	Host city	Men's singles	Women's singles	Men's doubles	Women's doubles	Mixed doubles
1982	Valladolid (Castile and León)	José Luis Carballido	Margarita Miguelez	Pedro V. Blach; Fernando Delgado	Margarita Miguelez; Aída Carballal	Pedro V. Blach; Loli Alonso
1983	Madrid (Community of Madrid)	Pedro V. Blach	Margarita Miguelez	José Luis Manivesa; José Matos	Margarita Miguelez; Aída Carballal	Pedro V. Blach; Rosa Pérez
1984	Málaga (Andalusia)	Enrique Ruiz	Margarita Miguelez	Carlos González; José Angel Bastos	Margarita Miguelez; Aida Carballal	Pedro V. Blach; Rosa Pérez
1985	Salamanca (Castile and León)	José Luis Carballido	Margarita Miguelez	Pedro V. Blach; Enrique Lago	Loli Alonso; María Jesús Rodríguez	Pedro V. Blach; María Jesús Rodríguez
1986	Murcia (Region of Murcia)	Enrique Ruiz	Margarita Miguelez	Pedro V. Blach; Enrique Lago	Margarita Miguelez; María Carmen Filgueiras	Enrique Lago; Mari Carmen Costas
1987	Sabiñánigo (Aragon)	Juan Amaro	Maria Emilia Gómez	Javier Vidal; Ángel Fernández	Aída Rodríguez; Maria Emilia Gómez	Pedro V. Blach; María Jesús Rodríguez
1988	A Coruña (Galicia (Spain))	Enrique Ruiz	Aída Rodríguez	Miguel Serrano; Bernardo Galmes	Aída Rodríguez; Maria Gómez	Ángel Fernández; Aída Rodríguez
1989	Vigo (Galicia (Spain))	Enrique Lago	Leonor Gallardo	Igor Khattry; Bernardo Galmes	Aída Rodríguez; Marta Otero	Ángel Fernández; Aída Rodríguez
1990	Gijón (Asturias)	David Serrano	Cristina González	José María Otero; Ángel Fernández	Cristina González; Esther Sanz	David Serrano; Cristina González
1991	Huesca (Aragon)	David Serrano	Cristina González	José María Otero; Ángel Fernández	Dolores Marco; Lidia Pomares	David Serrano; Esther Sanz
1992	Palma del Río (Andalusia)	David Serrano	Esther Sanz	Arturo Ruiz; Ernesto García	Cristina González; Mónica González	David Serrano; Esther Sanz
1993	Alicante (Valencian Community)	David Serrano	Ana C. Anaya	Arturo Ruiz; Ernesto García	Mónica González; Ana C. Anaya	David Serrano; Esther Sanz
1994	Benalmádena (Andalusia)	David Serrano	Esther Sanz	Arturo Ruiz; Ernesto García	Dolores Marco; Lidia Pomares	David Serrano; Esther Sanz
1995	Granada (Andalusia)	David Serrano	Dolores Marco	Arturo Ruiz; Ernesto García	Dolores Marco; María Torres	Arturo Ruiz; Dolores Marco
1996	Murcia (Region of Murcia)	David Serrano	Dolores Marco	Arturo Ruiz; Ernesto García	Dolores Marco; María Torres	David Serrano; Esther Sanz
1997	Valencia (Valencian Community)	Arturo Ruiz	Esther Sanz	Arturo Ruiz; Ernesto García	Mercedes Cuenca; Ana Ferrer	Sergio Llopis; Ana Ferrer
1998	Estepa (Andalusia)	Sergio Llopis	Dolores Marco	Arturo Ruiz; Ernesto García	Mercedes Cuenca; Ana Ferrer	Sergio Llopis; Ana Ferrer
1999	La Rinconada (Andalusia)	Arturo Ruiz	Dolores Marco	Arturo Ruiz; Ernesto García	Dolores Marco; Lucía Tavera	Sergio Llopis; Ana Ferrer
2000	Mijas (Andalusia)	Arturo Ruiz	Dolores Marco	Arturo Ruiz; Ernesto García	Dolores Marco; Lucía Tavera	Sergio Llopis; Mercedes Cuenca
2001	Almería (Andalusia)	José Antonio Crespo	Dolores Marco	Arturo Ruiz; Ernesto García	Dolores Marco; Lucía Tavera	Sergio Llopis; Mercedes Cuenca
2002	Santa Eulària des Riu (Balearic Islands)	José Antonio Crespo	Dolores Marco	José Antonio Crespo; Sergio Llopis	Dolores Marco; Ana Ferrer	José Antonio Crespo; Dolores Marco
2003	Manises (Valencian Community)	Sergio Llopis	Dolores Marco	José Antonio Crespo; Sergio Llopis	Dolores Marco; Ana Ferrer	José Antonio Crespo; Dolores Marco
2004	A Coruña (Galicia (Spain))	Arturo Ruiz	Yoana Martínez	Carlos Longo; Rafael Fernández	Lucía Tavera; Yoana Martínez	Pablo Abián; Patricia Pérez
2005	Gijón (Asturias)	Sergio Llopis	Lucía Tavera	Nicolás Escartín; José Antonio Crespo	Patricia Pérez; Silvia Riera	Sergio Llopis; Dolores Marco
2006	Zaragoza (Aragon)	José Antonio Crespo	Dolores Marco	Nicolás Escartín; José Antonio Crespo	Ana Ferrer; Yoana Martínez	Sergio Llopis; Dolores Marco
2007	Alicante (Valencian Community)	Pablo Abián	Lucía Tavera	José Antonio Crespo; Nicolás Escartín	Anabel Cháfer; Inmaculada Aparicio	Sergio Llopis; Dolores Marco
2008	Ibiza (Balearic Islands)	Pablo Abián	Yoana Martínez	José Antonio Crespo; Nicolás Escartín	Noelia Jiménez; Paula Rodríguez	Eliezer Ojeda; Paula Rodríguez
2009	Alicante (Valencian Community)	Pablo Abián	Carolina Marín	Eliezer Ojeda; David Leal	Carolina Marín; Ana María Martín	Carlos Longo; Haideé Ojeda
2010	Huelva (Andalusia)	Pablo Abián	Carolina Marín	Pablo Abián; Javier Abián	Carolina Marín; Ana María Martín	Carlos Longo; Haideé Ojeda
2011	Torrejón de Ardoz (Community of Madrid)	Pablo Abián	Carolina Marín	Rafael Fernández; Sergio Llopis	Noelia Jiménez; Paula Rodríguez	Ernesto Velázquez; Yoanna Martínez
2012	Huesca (Aragon)	Pablo Abián	Carolina Marín	Pablo Abián; Javier Abián	Blanca Ibeas; Laia Oset	Ernesto Velázquez; Haideé Ojeda
2013	A Estrada (Galicia (Spain))	Pablo Abián	Carolina Marín	Pablo Abián; Javier Abián	Laura Molina; Haidee Ojeda	Ernesto Velázquez; Haideé Ojeda
2014	Jaén (Andalusia)	Pablo Abián	Carolina Marín	Pablo Abián; Javier Abián	Noelia Jiménez; Laia Oset	Alejandro Toro; Manuela Díaz
2015	Ponteareas (Galicia (Spain))	Blai Ramírez	Sandra Chirlaque	Vicent Martínez; Eliezer Ojeda	Laura Molina; Haidee Ojeda	Alberto Zapico; Haidee Ojeda
2016	Santander (Cantabria)	Pablo Abián	Beatriz Corrales	Javier Suárez; Alberto Zapico	Noelia Jiménez; Blanca Ibeas	Eliezer Ojeda; Noelia Jiménez
2017	Ronda (Andalusia)	Pablo Abián	Clara Azurmendi	Pablo Abián; Javier Abián	Laura Molina; Haideé Ojeda	Alejandro Toro; Ana Peñas
2018	Oviedo (Asturias)	Pablo Abián	Sara Peñalver	Pablo Abián; Javier Abián	Laura Molina; Haideé Ojeda	Alberto Zapico; Lorena Uslé
2019	Pontevedra (Galicia (Spain))	Pablo Abián	Clara Azurmendi	Pablo Abián; Javier Abián	Laura Molina; Haideé Ojeda	Alberto Zapico; Lorena Uslé
2020	Huelva (Andalusia)	Pablo Abián	Manuela Díaz	Jaume Pérez Javier Sánchez	Laura Molina; Haideé Ojeda	Alberto Zapico; Lorena Uslé
2021	Cartagena (Region of Murcia)	Pablo Abián	Clara Azurmendi	Pablo Abián; Javier Abián	Clara Azurmendi Beatriz Corrales	Alberto Zapico; Lorena Uslé

== Successful players ==
Below is the list of the most ever successful players in the Spanish National Badminton Championships:

Players	MS	WS	MD	WD	XD	Total
Dolores Marco		9		9	6	24
Pablo Abián	14		8		1	23
Arturo Ruiz	4		10		1	15
Sergio Llopis	3		3		8	14
David Serrano	7				6	13
Haideé Ojeda				6	5	11
José Antonio Crespo	3		6		2	11
Ernesto García			10			10
Pedro V. Blach	1		3		5	9
Margarita Miguélez		5		4		9
Carolina Marín		6		2		8
Clara Azurmendi		3		1		4
