= 2016 Uber Cup group stage =

This article lists the complete results of the group stage of the 2016 Uber Cup in Kunshan, China.

All times Chinese Standard Time (UTC+08:00)

== Group A ==
| Team | Pts | Pld | W | L | MF | MA |
|---|---|---|---|---|---|---|
| China | 3 | 3 | 3 | 0 | 15 | 0 |
| Denmark | 2 | 3 | 2 | 1 | 7 | 8 |
| Malaysia | 1 | 3 | 1 | 2 | 5 | 10 |
| Spain | 0 | 3 | 0 | 3 | 3 | 12 |

=== China vs Malaysia ===
China
5
Kunshan Sports Center Stadium Court 2
15 May 2016

Malaysia
0

| | | | 1 | 2 | 3 |
|---|---|---|---|---|---|
| 1 | (China) (Malaysia) | Li Xuerui; Tee Jing Yi | 21; 13 | 21; 11 |
| 2 | (China) (Malaysia) | Tang Yuanting / Yu Yang; Vivian Hoo Kah Mun / Woon Khe Wei | 21; 11 | 14; 21 | 21; 18 |
| 3 | (China) (Malaysia) | Wang Yihan; Goh Jin Wei | 21; 16 | 21; 14 |
| 4 | (China) (Malaysia) | Tian Qing / Zhao Yunlei; Chow Mei Kuan / Lee Meng Yean | 21; 15 | 19; 21 | 21; 11 |
| 5 | (China) (Malaysia) | Sun Yu; Sonia Cheah Su Ya | 21; 9 | 21; 10 |

=== Denmark vs Spain ===
Denmark
4
Kunshan Sports Center Stadium Court 1
15 May 2016

Spain
1

| | | | 1 | 2 | 3 |
|---|---|---|---|---|---|
| 1 | (Denmark) (Spain) | Line Kjaersfeldt; Carolina Marin | 8; 21 | 23; 21 | 10; 21 |
| 2 | (Denmark) (Spain) | Anna Thea Madsen; Beatriz Corrales | 21; 15 | 14; 21 | 28; 26 |
| 3 | (Denmark) (Spain) | Mia Blichfeldt; Clara Azurmendi | 19; 21 | 21; 18 | 21; 8 |
| 4 | (Denmark) (Spain) | Maiken Fruergaard / Sara Thygesen; Beatriz Corrales / Lorena Usle | 21; 15 | 21; 5 |
| 5 | (Denmark) (Spain) | Christinna Pedersen / Kamilla Rytter Juhl; Clara Azurmendi / Laia Oset | 21; 7 | 21; 11 |

=== Denmark vs Malaysia ===
Denmark
3
Kunshan Sports Center Stadium Court 1
17 May 2016

Malaysia
2

| | | | 1 | 2 | 3 |
|---|---|---|---|---|---|
| 1 | (Denmark) (Malaysia) | Line Kjaersfeldt; Tee Jing Yi | 21; 11 | 21; 11 |
| 2 | (Denmark) (Malaysia) | Christinna Pedersen / Kamilla Rytter Juhl; Amelia Alicia Anscelly / Woon Khe Wei | 21; 16 | 21; 17 |
| 3 | (Denmark) (Malaysia) | Mette Poulsen; Goh Jin Wei | 18; 21 | 13; 21 |
| 4 | (Denmark) (Malaysia) | Maiken Fruergaard / Sara Thygesen; Goh Liu Ying / Vivian Hoo Kah Mun | 18; 21 | 24; 22 | 12; 21 |
| 5 | (Denmark) (Malaysia) | Anna Thea Madsen; Ho Yen Mei | 22; 24 | 21; 13 | 21; 13 |

=== China vs Spain ===
China
5
Kunshan Sports Center Stadium Court 1
17 May 2016

Spain
0

| | | | 1 | 2 | 3 |
|---|---|---|---|---|---|
| 1 | (China) (Spain) | Wang Shixian; Carolina Marin | 19; 21 | 21; 18 | 21; 19 |
| 2 | (China) (Spain) | Wang Yihan; Beatriz Corrales | 21; 11 | 21; 9 |
| 3 | (China) (Spain) | Sun Yu; Clara Azurmendi | 21; 9 | 21; 8 |
| 4 | (China) (Spain) | Chen Qingchen / Tang Jinhua; Beatriz Corrales / Lorena Usle | 21; 9 | 21; 5 |
| 5 | (China) (Spain) | Tang Yuanting / Yu Yang; Clara Azurmendi / Laia Oset | 21; 3 | 21; 10 |

=== Spain vs Malaysia ===
Spain
2
Kunshan Sports Center Stadium Court 2
18 May 2016

Malaysia
3

| | | | 1 | 2 | 3 |
|---|---|---|---|---|---|
| 1 | (Spain) (Malaysia) | Carolina Marin; Goh Jin Wei | 21; 18 | 20; 22 | 21; 16 |
| 2 | (Spain) (Malaysia) | Beatriz Corrales; Ho Yen Mei | 21; 13 | 21; 9 |
| 3 | (Spain) (Malaysia) | Clara Azurmendi; Sonia Cheah Su Ya | 14; 21 | 18; 21 |
| 4 | (Spain) (Malaysia) | Beatriz Corrales / Lorena Usle; Chow Mei Kuan / Lee Meng Yean | 12; 21 | 7; 21 |
| 5 | (Spain) (Malaysia) | Clara Azurmendi / Laia Oset; Amelia Alicia Anscelly / Woon Khe Wei | 12; 21 | 13; 21 |

=== China vs Denmark ===
China
5
Kunshan Sports Center Stadium Court 2
18 May 2016

Denmark
0

| | | | 1 | 2 | 3 |
|---|---|---|---|---|---|
| 1 | (China) (Denmark) | Li Xuerui; Natalia Koch Rohde | 21; 9 | 21; 11 |
| 2 | (China) (Denmark) | Chen Qingchen / Tang Yuanting; Maiken Fruergaard / Sara Thygesen | 21; 10 | 21; 5 |
| 3 | (China) (Denmark) | Wang Yihan; Anna Thea Madsen | 21; 6 | 21; 15 |
| 4 | (China) (Denmark) | Tang Jinhua / Zhao Yunlei; Line Kjaersfeldt / Mette Poulsen | 21; 10 | 21; 8 |
| 5 | (China) (Denmark) | Sun Yu; Mia Blichfeldt | 21; 10 | 21; 10 |

== Group B ==
| Team | Pts | Pld | W | L | MF | MA |
|---|---|---|---|---|---|---|
| South Korea | 3 | 3 | 3 | 0 | 14 | 1 |
| Chinese Taipei | 2 | 3 | 2 | 1 | 11 | 4 |
| United States | 1 | 3 | 1 | 2 | 5 | 10 |
| Mauritius | 0 | 3 | 0 | 3 | 0 | 15 |

=== Chinese Taipei vs Mauritius ===
Chinese Taipei
5
Kunshan Sports Center Stadium Court 4
15 May 2016

Mauritius
0

| | | | 1 | 2 | 3 |
|---|---|---|---|---|---|
| 1 | (Chinese Taipei) (Mauritius) | Tai Tzu-ying; Kate Foo Kune | 21; 14 | 21; 11 |
| 2 | (Chinese Taipei) (Mauritius) | Chiang Mei-hui; Nicki Chan-Lam | 20; 22 | 21; 5 | 21; 9 |
| 3 | (Chinese Taipei) (Mauritius) | Hu Ling-fang; Shania Leung | 21; 7 | 21; 6 |
| 4 | (Chinese Taipei) (Mauritius) | Hsieh Pei-chen / Wu Ti-jung; Kate Foo Kune / Yeldy Marie Louison | 21; 8 | 21; 6 |
| 5 | (Chinese Taipei) (Mauritius) | Chen Hsiao-huan / Huang Mei-ching; Nicki Chan-Lam / Shania Leung | 21; 5 | 21; 6 |

=== Korea vs United States ===
South Korea
5
Kunshan Sports Center Stadium Court 3
15 May 2016

United States
0

| | | | 1 | 2 | 3 |
|---|---|---|---|---|---|
| 1 | (South Korea) (United States) | Sung Ji-hyun; Iris Wang | 21; 14 | 21; 11 |
| 2 | (South Korea) (United States) | Bae Yeon-ju; Crystal Pan | 21; 9 | 21; 11 |
| 3 | (South Korea) (United States) | Kim Hyo-min; Kerry Xu | 21; 7 | 21; 4 |
| 4 | (South Korea) (United States) | Chang Ye-na / Lee So-hee; Jennie Gai / Crystal Pan | 21; 6 | 21; 4 |
| 5 | (South Korea) (United States) | Jung Kyung-eun / Shin Seung-chan; Annie Xu / Kerry Xu | 21; 11 | 21; 7 |

=== Korea vs Mauritius ===
South Korea
5
Kunshan Sports Center Stadium Court 4
16 May 2016

Mauritius
0

| | | | 1 | 2 | 3 |
|---|---|---|---|---|---|
| 1 | (South Korea) (Mauritius) | Bae Yeon-ju; Kate Foo Kune | 21; 8 | 21; 12 |
| 2 | (South Korea) (Mauritius) | Kim Hyo-min; Nicki Chan-Lam | 21; 9 | 21; 12 |
| 3 | (South Korea) (Mauritius) | Lee Jang-mi; Shania Leung | 21; 1 | 21; 3 |
| 4 | (South Korea) (Mauritius) | Go Ah-ra / Yoo Hae-won; Kate Foo Kune / Yeldy Marie Louison | 21; 7 | 21; 8 |
| 5 | (South Korea) (Mauritius) | Lee So-hee / Shin Seung-chan; Nicki Chan-Lam / Shania Leung | 21; 4 | 21; 5 |

=== Chinese Taipei vs United States ===
Chinese Taipei
5
Kunshan Sports Center Stadium Court 3
16 May 2016

United States
0

| | | | 1 | 2 | 3 |
|---|---|---|---|---|---|
| 1 | (Chinese Taipei) (United States) | Tai Tzu-ying; Iris Wang | 21; 13 | 21; 12 |
| 2 | (Chinese Taipei) (United States) | Pai Yu-po; Crystal Pan | 21; 8 | 21; 9 |
| 3 | (Chinese Taipei) (United States) | Hsu Ya-ching; Jennie Gai | 21; 8 | 21; 10 |
| 4 | (Chinese Taipei) (United States) | Hsieh Pei-chen / Wu Ti-jung; Annie Xu / Kerry Xu | 21; 15 | 21; 14 |
| 5 | (Chinese Taipei) (United States) | Chen Hsiao-huan / Hsu Ya-ching; Crystal Pan / Iris Wang | 21; 8 | 21; 9 |

=== Mauritius vs United States ===
Mauritius
0
Kunshan Sports Center Stadium Court 4
18 May 2016

United States
5

| | | | 1 | 2 | 3 |
|---|---|---|---|---|---|---|
| 1 | (Mauritius) (United States) | Kate Foo Kune; Iris Wang | 10; 21 | 6; 21 |
| 2 | (Mauritius) (United States) | Nicki Chan-Lam; Crystal Pan | 21; 14 | 14; 21 | 5; 15 | retired |
| 3 | (Mauritius) (United States) | Yeldy Marie Louison; Annie Xu | 9; 21 | 7; 21 |
| 4 | (Mauritius) (United States) | Nicki Chan-Lam / Shania Leung; Crystal Pan / Iris Wang |
| 5 | (Mauritius) (United States) | Kate Foo Kune / Yeldy Marie Louison; Annie Xu / Kerry Xu | 9; 21 | 11; 21 |

=== Korea vs Chinese Taipei ===
South Korea
4
Kunshan Sports Center Stadium Court 3
18 May 2016

Chinese Taipei
1

| | | | 1 | 2 | 3 |
|---|---|---|---|---|---|
| 1 | (South Korea) (Chinese Taipei) | Sung Ji-hyun; Tai Tzu-ying | 11; 21 | 17; 21 |
| 2 | (South Korea) (Chinese Taipei) | Jung Kyung-eun / Shin Seung-chan; Hsieh Pei-chen / Wu Ti-jung | 21; 15 | 21; 11 |
| 3 | (South Korea) (Chinese Taipei) | Bae Yeon-ju; Pai Yu-po | 19; 21 | 21; 10 | 21; 17 |
| 4 | (South Korea) (Chinese Taipei) | Chang Ye-na / Lee So-hee; Chen Hsiao-huan / Hsu Ya-ching | 21; 12 | 21; 16 |
| 5 | (South Korea) (Chinese Taipei) | Kim Hyo-min; Hsu Ya-ching | 21; 18 | 21; 11 |

== Group C ==
| Team | Pts | Pld | W | L | MF | MA |
|---|---|---|---|---|---|---|
| Thailand | 3 | 3 | 3 | 0 | 12 | 3 |
| Indonesia | 2 | 3 | 2 | 1 | 10 | 5 |
| Hong Kong | 1 | 3 | 1 | 2 | 6 | 9 |
| Bulgaria | 0 | 3 | 0 | 3 | 2 | 13 |

=== Thailand vs Hong Kong ===
Thailand
4
Kunshan Sports Center Stadium Court 2
15 May 2016

Hong Kong
1

| | | | 1 | 2 | 3 |
|---|---|---|---|---|---|
| 1 | (Thailand) (Hong Kong) | Ratchanok Intanon; Yip Pui Yin | 21; 18 | 21; 15 |
| 2 | (Thailand) (Hong Kong) | Puttita Supajirakul / Sapsiree Taerattanachai; Tse Ying Suet / Yuen Sin Ying | 21; 16 | 21; 18 |
| 3 | (Thailand) (Hong Kong) | Busanan Ongbumrungphan; Cheung Ngan Yi | 14; 21 | 13; 21 |
| 4 | (Thailand) (Hong Kong) | Jongkolphan Kititharakul / Rawinda Prajongjai; Ng Tsz Yau / Yeung Nga Ting | 21; 7 | 21; 17 |
| 5 | (Thailand) (Hong Kong) | Nitchaon Jindapol; Cheung Ying Mei | 21; 11 | 21; 14 |

=== Indonesia vs Bulgaria ===
Indonesia
5
Kunshan Sports Center Stadium Court 3
15 May 2016

Bulgaria
0

| | | | 1 | 2 | 3 |
|---|---|---|---|---|---|
| 1 | (Indonesia) (Bulgaria) | Maria Febe Kusumastuti; Linda Zetchiri | 21; 12 | 24; 22 |
| 2 | (Indonesia) (Bulgaria) | Fitriani; Petya Nedelcheva | 21; 9 | 21; 15 |
| 3 | (Indonesia) (Bulgaria) | Anggia Shitta Awanda / Ni Ketut Mahadewi Istirani; Gabriela Stoeva / Stefani Stoeva | 21; 16 | 15; 21 | 21; 18 |
| 4 | (Indonesia) (Bulgaria) | Hanna Ramadini; Mariya Mitsova | 21; 17 | 21; 16 |
| 5 | (Indonesia) (Bulgaria) | Della Destiara Haris / Rosyita Eka Putri Sari; Mariya Mitsova / Petya Nedelcheva | 21; 9 | 21; 11 |

=== Thailand vs Bulgaria ===
Thailand
5
Kunshan Sports Center Stadium Court 3
16 May 2016

Bulgaria
0

| | | | 1 | 2 | 3 |
|---|---|---|---|---|---|
| 1 | (Thailand) (Bulgaria) | Ratchanok Intanon; Linda Zetchiri | 17; 21 | 21; 14 | 21; 15 |
| 2 | (Thailand) (Bulgaria) | Busanan Ongbumrungphan; Petya Nedelcheva | 21; 10 | 21; 15 |
| 3 | (Thailand) (Bulgaria) | Nitchaon Jindapol; Mariya Mitsova | 21; 19 | 21; 19 |
| 4 | (Thailand) (Bulgaria) | Puttita Supajirakul / Sapsiree Taerattanachai; Gabriela Stoeva / Stefani Stoeva | 21; 11 | 21; 16 |
| 5 | (Thailand) (Bulgaria) | Jongkolphan Kititharakul / Rawinda Prajongjai; Mariya Mitsova / Petya Nedelcheva | 21; 9 | 21; 9 |

=== Indonesia vs Hong Kong ===
Indonesia
3
Kunshan Sports Center Stadium Court 1
16 May 2016

Hong Kong
2

| | | | 1 | 2 | 3 |
|---|---|---|---|---|---|
| 1 | (Indonesia) (Hong Kong) | Maria Febe Kusumastuti; Yip Pui Yin | 19; 21 | 21; 12 | 18; 21 |
| 2 | (Indonesia) (Hong Kong) | Anggia Shitta Awanda / Greysia Polii; Tse Ying Suet / Yuen Sin Ying | 21; 10 | 21; 16 |
| 3 | (Indonesia) (Hong Kong) | Fitriani; Cheung Ngan Yi | 16; 21 | 21; 12 | 16; 21 |
| 4 | (Indonesia) (Hong Kong) | Della Destiara Haris / Rosyita Eka Putri Sari; Ng Tsz Yau / Yeung Nga Ting | 21; 16 | 21; 8 |
| 5 | (Indonesia) (Hong Kong) | Hanna Ramadini; Ng Wing Yung | 21; 16 | 21; 11 |

=== Bulgaria vs Hong Kong ===
Bulgaria
2
Kunshan Sports Center Stadium Court 3
17 May 2016

Hong Kong
3

| | | | 1 | 2 | 3 |
|---|---|---|---|---|---|
| 1 | (Bulgaria) (Hong Kong) | Linda Zetchiri; Yip Pui Yin | 17; 21 | 21; 14 | 17; 21 |
| 2 | (Bulgaria) (Hong Kong) | Petya Nedelcheva; Cheung Ngan Yi | 9; 21 | 16; 21 |
| 3 | (Bulgaria) (Hong Kong) | Mariya Mitsova; Cheung Ying Mei | 18; 21 | 20; 22 |
| 4 | (Bulgaria) (Hong Kong) | Gabriela Stoeva / Stefani Stoeva; Tse Ying Suet / Yuen Sin Ying | 21; 15 | 21; 8 |
| 5 | (Bulgaria) (Hong Kong) | Mariya Mitsova / Petya Nedelcheva; Ng Tsz Yau / Yeung Nga Ting | 10; 21 | 22; 20 | 21; 13 |

=== Thailand vs Indonesia ===
Thailand
3
Kunshan Sports Center Stadium Court 2
17 May 2016

Indonesia
2

| | | | 1 | 2 | 3 |
|---|---|---|---|---|---|
| 1 | (Thailand) (Indonesia) | Ratchanok Intanon; Maria Febe Kusumastuti | 21; 14 | 21; 14 |
| 2 | (Thailand) (Indonesia) | Puttita Supajirakul / Sapsiree Taerattanachai; Della Destiara Haris / Rosyita Eka Putri Sari | 14; 21 | 12; 21 |
| 3 | (Thailand) (Indonesia) | Busanan Ongbumrungphan; Hanna Ramadini | 21; 8 | 21; 11 |
| 4 | (Thailand) (Indonesia) | Jongkolphan Kititharakul / Rawinda Prajongjai; Anggia Shitta Awanda / Tiara Rosalia Nuraidah | 14; 21 | 21; 17 | 24; 22 |
| 5 | (Thailand) (Indonesia) | Nitchaon Jindapol; Gregoria Mariska Tunjung | 21; 13 | 14; 21 | 20; 22 |

== Group D ==
| Team | Pts | Pld | W | L | MF | MA |
|---|---|---|---|---|---|---|
| Japan | 3 | 3 | 3 | 0 | 13 | 2 |
| India | 2 | 3 | 2 | 1 | 12 | 3 |
| Germany | 1 | 3 | 1 | 2 | 4 | 11 |
| Australia | 0 | 3 | 0 | 3 | 1 | 14 |

=== India vs Australia ===
India
5
Kunshan Sports Center Stadium Court 2
16 May 2016

Australia
0

| | | | 1 | 2 | 3 |
|---|---|---|---|---|---|
| 1 | (India) (Australia) | Saina Nehwal; Wendy Chen | 22; 20 | 21; 14 |
| 2 | (India) (Australia) | Pusarla Venkata Sindhu; Joy Lai | 21; 12 | 21; 11 |
| 3 | (India) (Australia) | Jwala Gutta / Ashwini Ponnappa; Wendy Chen / Gronya Somerville | 21; 9 | 21; 15 |
| 4 | (India) (Australia) | Ruthvika Shivani Gadde; Tiffany Ho | 21; 5 | 21; 11 |
| 5 | (India) (Australia) | Sikki Reddy Nelakurthi / Pusarla Venkata Sindhu; Leanne Choo / Joy Lai | 21; 12 | 21; 12 |

=== Japan vs Germany ===
Japan
5
Kunshan Sports Center Stadium Court 2
16 May 2016

Germany
0

| | | | 1 | 2 | 3 |
|---|---|---|---|---|---|
| 1 | (Japan) (Germany) | Nozomi Okuhara; Fabienne Deprez | 21; 8 | 21; 11 |
| 2 | (Japan) (Germany) | Misaki Matsutomo / Ayaka Takahashi; Isabel Herttrich / Lara Kaepplein | 21; 13 | 21; 3 |
| 3 | (Japan) (Germany) | Akane Yamaguchi; Luise Heim | 21; 10 | 21; 14 |
| 4 | (Japan) (Germany) | Naoko Fukuman / Kurumi Yonao; Linda Efler / Jennifer Karnott | 21; 9 | 21; 12 |
| 5 | (Japan) (Germany) | Sayaka Sato; Yvonne Li | 21; 11 | 21; 15 |

=== India vs Germany ===
India
5
Kunshan Sports Center Stadium Court 4
17 May 2016

Germany
0

| | | | 1 | 2 | 3 |
|---|---|---|---|---|---|
| 1 | (India) (Germany) | Saina Nehwal; Fabienne Deprez | 21; 15 | 21; 10 |
| 2 | (India) (Germany) | Pusarla Venkata Sindhu; Luise Heim | 21; 7 | 21; 12 |
| 3 | (India) (Germany) | Jwala Gutta / Ashwini Ponnappa; Linda Efler / Lara Kaepplein | 14; 21 | 21; 9 | 21; 8 |
| 4 | (India) (Germany) | Ruthvika Shivani Gadde; Yvonne Li | 21; 5 | 21; 15 |
| 5 | (India) (Germany) | Sikki Reddy Nelakurthi / Pusarla Venkata Sindhu; Isabel Herttrich / Franziska Volkmann | 21; 18 | 19; 21 | 22; 20 |

=== Japan vs Australia ===
Japan
5
Kunshan Sports Center Stadium Court 3
17 May 2016

Australia
0

| | | | 1 | 2 | 3 |
|---|---|---|---|---|---|
| 1 | (Japan) (Australia) | Nozomi Okuhara; Wendy Chen | 21; 16 | 21; 15 |
| 2 | (Japan) (Australia) | Shizuka Matsuo / Mami Naito; Leanne Choo / Gronya Somerville | 21; 8 | 21; 13 |
| 3 | (Japan) (Australia) | Sayaka Sato; Joy Lai | 21; 9 | 21; 6 |
| 4 | (Japan) (Australia) | Misaki Matsutomo / Ayaka Takahashi; Wendy Chen / Tiffany Ho | 21; 7 | 21; 5 |
| 5 | (Japan) (Australia) | Aya Ohori; Jennifer Tam | 21; 6 | 21; 14 |

=== Japan vs India ===
Japan
3
Kunshan Sports Center Stadium Court 1
18 May 2016

India
2

| | | | 1 | 2 | 3 |
|---|---|---|---|---|---|
| 1 | (Japan) (India) | Nozomi Okuhara; Saina Nehwal | 18; 21 | 6; 21 |
| 2 | (Japan) (India) | Akane Yamaguchi; Pusarla Venkata Sindhu | 11; 21 | 18; 21 |
| 3 | (Japan) (India) | Misaki Matsutomo / Ayaka Takahashi; Jwala Gutta / Sikki Reddy Nelakurthi | 21; 11 | 21; 8 |
| 4 | (Japan) (India) | Sayaka Sato; Ruthvika Shivani Gadde | 21; 7 | 21; 14 |
| 5 | (Japan) (India) | Shizuka Matsuo / Mami Naito; Ashwini Ponnappa / Pusarla Venkata Sindhu | 15; 21 | 21; 19 | 21; 16 |

=== Australia vs Germany ===
Australia
1
Kunshan Sports Center Stadium Court 4
18 May 2016

Germany
4

| | | | 1 | 2 | 3 |
|---|---|---|---|---|---|
| 1 | (Australia) (Germany) | Wendy Chen; Fabienne Deprez | 15; 21 | 14; 21 |
| 2 | (Australia) (Germany) | Joy Lai; Luise Heim | 21; 17 | 21; 17 |
| 3 | (Australia) (Germany) | Leanne Choo / Gronya Somerville; Isabel Herttrich / Eva Janssens | 20; 22 | 15; 21 |
| 4 | (Australia) (Germany) | Tiffany Ho; Yvonne Li | 21; 19 | 14; 21 | 13; 21 |
| 5 | (Australia) (Germany) | Wendy Chen / Joy Lai; Linda Efler / Lara Kaepplein | 21; 15 | 16; 21 | 16; 21 |
