= 2016 Thomas & Uber Cup =

2016 Thomas & Uber Cup 2016年汤姆斯杯和尤伯杯

Tournament details
- Dates: 15–22 May
- Edition: 29th (Thomas Cup); 26th (Uber Cup)
- Level: International
- Venue: Kunshan Sports Centre
- Location: Kunshan, Jiangsu, China

The 2016 Thomas & Uber Cup was the 29th tournament of the Thomas Cup and 26th tournament of the Uber Cup, the premier badminton team championships for men and women respectively. It was held at the Kunshan Sports Centre in Kunshan, Jiangsu Province, China.

== Host city selection ==
Jakarta and Kunshan submitted bids for this championships, the same situation as the bid for 2015 BWF World Championships. Kunshan was named as the host in May 2014 during BWF Council meeting in New Delhi, India.

== Qualifiers ==
Confederation	Qualifiers	
Confederation	Thomas Cup	Uber Cup
Defending Champions	Japan	China
Host Nation	China	China
Africa	South Africa	Mauritius
Asia	India; Indonesia; South Korea; Malaysia	India; Japan; South Korea; Thailand
Europe	Denmark; Germany; England; France	Denmark; Germany; Spain; Bulgaria
Oceania	New Zealand	Australia
Pan America	Mexico	United States
By Ranking	Chinese Taipei; Hong Kong; Thailand	Chinese Taipei; Hong Kong; Indonesia; Malaysia

== Seedings ==
The seeding list was based on 3 March 2016 World Rankings.

Thomas Cup

1. China (Quarterfinal)
2. Denmark (Champion)
3. South Korea (Semifinal)
4. Indonesia (Final)
5. Japan (Quarterfinal)
6. Malaysia (Semifinal)
7. India (Group)
8. Chinese Taipei (Quarterfinal)
9. Hong Kong (Quarterfinal)
10. Thailand (Group)
11. England (Group)
12. Germany (Group)
13. France (Group)
14. Mexico (Group)
15. South Africa (Group)
16. New Zealand (Group)

Uber Cup

1. China (Champion)
2. Japan (Semifinal)
3. South Korea (Final)
4. Thailand (Quarterfinal)
5. India (Semifinal)
6. Indonesia (Quarterfinal)
7. Chinese Taipei (Quarterfinal)
8. Denmark (Quarterfinal)
9. Germany (Group)
10. Malaysia (Group)
11. Spain (Group)
12. Hong Kong (Group)
13. United States (Group)
14. Bulgaria (Group)
15. Australia (Group)
16. Mauritius (Group)

== Medal summary ==
=== Medalists ===
Event	Gold	Silver	Bronze
Thomas Cup	Denmark; Viktor Axelsen; Jan Ø. Jørgensen; Hans-Kristian Vittinghus; Emil Holst; Mathias Boe; Mads Conrad-Petersen; Mads Pieler Kolding; Anders Skaarup Rasmussen; Kim Astrup; Mathias Christiansen	Indonesia; Tommy Sugiarto; Jonatan Christie; Anthony Sinisuka Ginting; Ihsan Maulana Mustofa; Mohammad Ahsan; Hendra Setiawan; Angga Pratama; Ricky Karanda Suwardi; Marcus Fernaldi Gideon; Kevin Sanjaya Sukamuljo	Malaysia; Lee Chong Wei; Iskandar Zulkarnain Zainuddin; Goh Soon Huat; Chong Wei Feng; Goh V Shem; Tan Wee Kiong; Koo Kien Keat; Tan Boon Heong; Ong Yew Sin; Teo Ee Yi
Thomas Cup	Denmark; Viktor Axelsen; Jan Ø. Jørgensen; Hans-Kristian Vittinghus; Emil Holst; Mathias Boe; Mads Conrad-Petersen; Mads Pieler Kolding; Anders Skaarup Rasmussen; Kim Astrup; Mathias Christiansen	Indonesia; Tommy Sugiarto; Jonatan Christie; Anthony Sinisuka Ginting; Ihsan Maulana Mustofa; Mohammad Ahsan; Hendra Setiawan; Angga Pratama; Ricky Karanda Suwardi; Marcus Fernaldi Gideon; Kevin Sanjaya Sukamuljo	South Korea; Son Wan-ho; Lee Dong-keun; Jeon Hyeok-jin; Heo Kwang-hee; Lee Yong-dae; Yoo Yeon-seong; Kim Gi-jung; Kim Sa-rang; Ko Sung-hyun; Shin Baek-cheol
Uber Cup	China; Li Xuerui; Wang Yihan; Wang Shixian; Sun Yu; Tang Yuanting; Yu Yang; Tian Qing; Zhao Yunlei; Chen Qingchen; Tang Jinhua	South Korea; Sung Ji-hyun; Bae Yeon-ju; Kim Hyo-min; Lee Jang-mi; Jung Kyung-eun; Shin Seung-chan; Lee So-hee; Chang Ye-na; Go Ah-ra; Yoo Hae-won	Japan; Nozomi Okuhara; Akane Yamaguchi; Sayaka Sato; Aya Ohori; Misaki Matsutomo; Ayaka Takahashi; Naoko Fukuman; Kurumi Yonao; Shizuka Matsuo; Mami Naito
Uber Cup	China; Li Xuerui; Wang Yihan; Wang Shixian; Sun Yu; Tang Yuanting; Yu Yang; Tian Qing; Zhao Yunlei; Chen Qingchen; Tang Jinhua	South Korea; Sung Ji-hyun; Bae Yeon-ju; Kim Hyo-min; Lee Jang-mi; Jung Kyung-eun; Shin Seung-chan; Lee So-hee; Chang Ye-na; Go Ah-ra; Yoo Hae-won	India; Saina Nehwal; P. V. Sindhu; Tanvi Lad; Gadde Ruthvika Shivani; P. C. Thulasi; Ashwini Ponnappa; Jwala Gutta; N. Sikki Reddy; K. Maneesha

=== Medal table ===
* Host nation (China)

Rank	Nation	Gold	Silver	Bronze	Total
1	China*	1	0	0	1
1	Denmark	1	0	0	1
3	South Korea	0	1	1	2
4	Indonesia	0	1	0	1
5	India	0	0	1	1
5	Japan	0	0	1	1
5	Malaysia	0	0	1	1
Totals (7 entries)		2	2	4	8

== Thomas Cup ==
All times are UTC+08:00

=== Groups ===
==== Group A ====
Team	Pts	Pld	W	L
China	3	3	3	0
Japan	2	3	2	1
France	1	3	1	2
Mexico	0	3	0	3

15 May 2016
China	5–0	Mexico
Japan	5–0	France
16 May 2016
Japan	5–0	Mexico
China	5–0	France
18 May 2016
France	5–0	Mexico
China	5–0	Japan

==== Group B ====
Team	Pts	Pld	W	L
Indonesia	3	3	3	0
Hong Kong	2	3	2	1
Thailand	1	3	1	2
India	0	3	0	3

15 May 2016
India	2–3	Thailand
Indonesia	5–0	Hong Kong
17 May 2016
India	2–3	Hong Kong
Indonesia	4–1	Thailand
18 May 2016
Indonesia	5–0	India
Thailand	1–4	Hong Kong

==== Group C ====
Team	Pts	Pld	W	L
Malaysia	3	3	3	0
South Korea	2	3	2	1
England	1	3	1	2
Germany	0	3	0	3

15 May 2016
South Korea	5–0	Germany
Malaysia	4–1	England
16 May 2016
Malaysia	5–0	Germany
South Korea	5–0	England
17 May 2016
South Korea	2–3	Malaysia
England	4–1	Germany

==== Group D ====
Team	Pts	Pld	W	L
Denmark	3	3	3	0
Chinese Taipei	2	3	2	1
New Zealand	1	3	1	2
South Africa	0	3	0	3

16 May 2016
Denmark	5–0	South Africa
Chinese Taipei	5–0	New Zealand
17 May 2016
Denmark	5–0	New Zealand
Chinese Taipei	5–0	South Africa
18 May 2016
Denmark	3–2	Chinese Taipei
New Zealand	4–1	South Africa

=== Knockout stage ===
Quarter-finals
19 May 2016
China	1
South Korea	3
19 May 2016
Indonesia	3
Hong Kong	1
19 May 2016
Chinese Taipei	1
Malaysia	3
19 May 2016
Japan	2
Denmark	3

Semi-finals
20 May 2016
South Korea	1
Indonesia	3
20 May 2016
Malaysia	2
Denmark	3

Final
22 May 2016
Indonesia	2
Denmark	3

==== Quarterfinals ====
Chinese Taipei
1
Kunshan Sports Centre, Court 2
19 May 2016
13:00

Malaysia
3

			1	2	3
1	(Chinese Taipei) (Malaysia)	Chou Tien-chen; Lee Chong Wei	18; 21	18; 21
2	(Chinese Taipei) (Malaysia)	Lee Sheng-mu / Tsai Chia-hsin; Goh V Shem / Tan Wee Kiong	16; 21	21; 19	21; 19
3	(Chinese Taipei) (Malaysia)	Hsu Jen-hao; Iskandar Zulkarnain Zainuddin	8; 21	13; 21
4	(Chinese Taipei) (Malaysia)	Chen Hung-ling / Wang Chi-lin; Koo Kien Keat / Tan Boon Heong	16; 21	20; 22
5	(Chinese Taipei) (Malaysia)	Wang Tzu-wei; Chong Wei Feng				not played

Indonesia
3
Kunshan Sports Centre, Court 3
19 May 2016
13:00

Hong Kong
1

			1	2	3
1	(Indonesia) (Hong Kong)	Tommy Sugiarto; Ng Ka Long	11; 21	21; 19	21; 15
2	(Indonesia) (Hong Kong)	Mohammad Ahsan / Hendra Setiawan; Or Chin Chung / Tang Chun Man	17; 21	19; 21
3	(Indonesia) (Hong Kong)	Jonatan Christie; Hu Yun	21; 14	18; 21	21; 16
4	(Indonesia) (Hong Kong)	Angga Pratama / Ricky Karanda Suwardi; Law Cheuk Him / Yeung Shing Choi	21; 16	21; 14
5	(Indonesia) (Hong Kong)	Ihsan Maulana Mustofa; Wei Nan				not played

China
1
Kunshan Sports Centre, Court 1
19 May 2016
19:00

South Korea
3

			1	2	3
1	(China) (South Korea)	Chen Long; Son Wan-ho	12; 21	21; 16	15; 21
2	(China) (South Korea)	Fu Haifeng / Zhang Nan; Lee Yong-dae / Yoo Yeon-seong	25; 23	21; 23	12; 21
3	(China) (South Korea)	Lin Dan; Lee Dong-keun	21; 10	21; 15
4	(China) (South Korea)	Li Junhui / Zheng Siwei; Kim Gi-jung / Kim Sa-rang	15; 21	18; 21
5	(China) (South Korea)	Tian Houwei; Jeon Hyeok-jin				not played

Japan
2
Kunshan Sports Centre, Court 4
19 May 2016
19:00

Denmark
3

			1	2	3
1	(Japan) (Denmark)	Sho Sasaki; Viktor Axelsen	13; 21	16; 21
2	(Japan) (Denmark)	Hiroyuki Endo / Kenichi Hayakawa; Mathias Boe / Mads Conrad-Petersen	16; 21	17; 21
3	(Japan) (Denmark)	Takuma Ueda; Jan Ø. Jørgensen	21; 13	13; 21	21; 10
4	(Japan) (Denmark)	Takeshi Kamura / Keigo Sonoda; Kim Astrup / Anders Skaarup Rasmussen	21; 15	21; 17
5	(Japan) (Denmark)	Riichi Takeshita; Hans-Kristian Vittinghus	21; 23	17; 21

==== Semifinals ====
South Korea
1
Kunshan Sports Centre, Court 2
20 May 2016
13:00

Indonesia
3

			1	2	3
1	(South Korea) (Indonesia)	Son Wan-ho; Jonatan Christie	21; 10	21; 16
2	(South Korea) (Indonesia)	Lee Yong-dae / Yoo Yeon-seong; Mohammad Ahsan / Hendra Setiawan	15; 21	12; 21
3	(South Korea) (Indonesia)	Lee Dong-keun; Anthony Sinisuka Ginting	18; 21	18; 21
4	(South Korea) (Indonesia)	Kim Gi-jung / Kim Sa-rang; Angga Pratama / Ricky Karanda Suwardi	15; 21	18; 21
5	(South Korea) (Indonesia)	Jeon Hyeok-jin; Ihsan Maulana Mustofa				not played

Malaysia
2
Kunshan Sports Centre, Court 1
20 May 2016
19:00

Denmark
3

			1	2	3
1	(Malaysia) (Denmark)	Lee Chong Wei; Viktor Axelsen	23; 21	21; 18
2	(Malaysia) (Denmark)	Goh V Shem / Tan Wee Kiong; Mathias Boe / Mads Conrad-Petersen	21; 18	21; 18
3	(Malaysia) (Denmark)	Iskandar Zulkarnain Zainuddin; Hans-Kristian Vittinghus	18; 21	18; 21
4	(Malaysia) (Denmark)	Koo Kien Keat / Tan Boon Heong; Kim Astrup / Anders Skaarup Rasmussen	21; 10	8; 21	13; 21
5	(Malaysia) (Denmark)	Chong Wei Feng; Emil Holst	15; 21	18; 21

==== Final ====
Indonesia
2
Kunshan Sports Centre, Court 1
22 May 2016
13:00

Denmark
3

			1	2	3
1	(Indonesia) (Denmark)	Tommy Sugiarto; Viktor Axelsen	17; 21	18; 21
2	(Indonesia) (Denmark)	Mohammad Ahsan / Hendra Setiawan; Mads Conrad-Petersen / Mads Pieler Kolding	21; 18	21; 13
3	(Indonesia) (Denmark)	Anthony Sinisuka Ginting; Jan Ø. Jørgensen	17; 21	12; 21
4	(Indonesia) (Denmark)	Angga Pratama / Ricky Karanda Suwardi; Kim Astrup / Anders Skaarup Rasmussen	21; 16	21; 14
5	(Indonesia) (Denmark)	Ihsan Maulana Mustofa; Hans-Kristian Vittinghus	15; 21	7; 21

2016 Thomas Cup champion

Denmark
First title

=== Final ranking ===
Pos	Team	Pld	W	L	Pts	MD	GD	PD	Final result
1st place, gold medalist(s)	Denmark	6	6	0	6	+14	+29	+263	Champions
2nd place, silver medalist(s)	Indonesia	6	5	1	5	+16	+17	+148	Runners-up
3rd place, bronze medalist(s)	Malaysia	5	4	1	4	+10	+22	+168	Eliminated in semi-finals
3rd place, bronze medalist(s)	South Korea	5	3	2	3	+9	+16	+152	Eliminated in semi-finals
5	China	4	3	1	3	+13	+24	+235	Eliminated in quarter-finals
6	Chinese Taipei	4	2	2	2	+7	+12	+149	Eliminated in quarter-finals
7	Japan	4	2	2	2	+4	+9	+118	Eliminated in quarter-finals
8	Hong Kong	4	2	2	2	−3	−4	+30	Eliminated in quarter-finals
9	Thailand	3	1	2	1	−5	−9	−67	Eliminated in group stage
10	England	3	1	2	1	−5	−10	−53	Eliminated in group stage
11	France	3	1	2	1	−5	−10	−71	Eliminated in group stage
12	New Zealand	3	1	2	1	−7	−16	−176	Eliminated in group stage
13	India	3	0	3	0	−7	−12	−114	Eliminated in group stage
14	South Africa	3	0	3	0	−13	−24	−233	Eliminated in group stage
15	Germany	3	0	3	0	−13	−26	−249	Eliminated in group stage
16	Mexico	3	0	3	0	−15	−28	−300	Eliminated in group stage

== Uber Cup ==
All times are UTC+08:00

=== Groups ===
==== Group A ====
Team	Pts	Pld	W	L
China	3	3	3	0
Denmark	2	3	2	1
Malaysia	1	3	1	2
Spain	0	3	0	3

15 May 2016
China	5–0	Malaysia
Denmark	4–1	Spain
17 May 2016
Denmark	3–2	Malaysia
China	5–0	Spain
18 May 2016
Spain	2–3	Malaysia
China	5–0	Denmark

==== Group B ====
Team	Pts	Pld	W	L
South Korea	3	3	3	0
Chinese Taipei	2	3	2	1
United States	1	3	1	2
Mauritius	0	3	0	3

15 May 2016
Chinese Taipei	5–0	Mauritius
South Korea	5–0	United States
16 May 2016
South Korea	5–0	Mauritius
Chinese Taipei	5–0	United States
18 May 2016
Mauritius	0–5	United States
South Korea	4–1	Chinese Taipei

==== Group C ====
Team	Pts	Pld	W	L
Thailand	3	3	3	0
Indonesia	2	3	2	1
Hong Kong	1	3	1	2
Bulgaria	0	3	0	3

15 May 2016
Thailand	4–1	Hong Kong
Indonesia	5–0	Bulgaria
16 May 2016
Thailand	5–0	Bulgaria
Indonesia	3–2	Hong Kong
17 May 2016
Bulgaria	2–3	Hong Kong
Thailand	3–2	Indonesia

==== Group D ====
Team	Pts	Pld	W	L
Japan	3	3	3	0
India	2	3	2	1
Germany	1	3	1	2
Australia	0	3	0	3

16 May 2016
India	5–0	Australia
Japan	5–0	Germany
17 May 2016
India	5–0	Germany
Japan	5–0	Australia
18 May 2016
Japan	3–2	India
Australia	1–4	Germany

=== Knockout stage ===
Quarter-finals
19 May 2016
China	3
Chinese Taipei	0
19 May 2016
Thailand	1
India	3
19 May 2016
Indonesia	0
South Korea	3
19 May 2016
Denmark	0
Japan	3

Semi-finals
20 May 2016
China	3
India	0
20 May 2016
South Korea	3
Japan	1

Final
21 May 2016
China	3
South Korea	1

==== Quarterfinals ====
Thailand
1
Kunshan Sports Centre, Court 1
19 May 2016
13:00

India
3

			1	2	3
1	(Thailand) (India)	Ratchanok Intanon; Saina Nehwal	21; 12	21; 19
2	(Thailand) (India)	Busanan Ongbumrungphan; Pusarla Venkata Sindhu	18; 21	7; 21
3	(Thailand) (India)	Puttita Supajirakul / Sapsiree Taerattanachai; Jwala Gutta / Ashwini Ponnappa	19; 21	12; 21
4	(Thailand) (India)	Nitchaon Jindapol; Ruthvika Shivani Gadde	18; 21	16; 21
5	(Thailand) (India)	Jongkolphan Kititharakul / Rawinda Prajongjai; Sikki Reddy Nelakurthi / Pusarla Venkata Sindhu				not played

Indonesia
0
Kunshan Sports Centre, Court 4
19 May 2016
13:00

South Korea
3

			1	2	3
1	(Indonesia) (South Korea)	Maria Febe Kusumastuti; Sung Ji-hyun	13; 21	12; 21
2	(Indonesia) (South Korea)	Anggia Shitta Awanda / Greysia Polii; Jung Kyung-eun / Shin Seung-chan	13; 21	19; 21
3	(Indonesia) (South Korea)	Fitriani; Bae Yeon-ju	13; 21	21; 14	15; 21
4	(Indonesia) (South Korea)	Della Destiara Haris / Rosyita Eka Putri Sari; Chang Ye-na / Lee So-hee				not played
5	(Indonesia) (South Korea)	Gregoria Mariska; Kim Hyo-min				not played

China
3
Kunshan Sports Centre, Court 2
19 May 2016
19:00

Chinese Taipei
0

			1	2	3
1	(China) (Chinese Taipei)	Li Xuerui; Pai Yu-po	21; 14	21; 17
2	(China) (Chinese Taipei)	Wang Shixian; Hsu Ya-ching	21; 16	21; 12
3	(China) (Chinese Taipei)	Tian Qing / Zhao Yunlei; Hsieh Pei-chen / Wu Ti-jung	21; 11	21; 14
4	(China) (Chinese Taipei)	Wang Yihan; Chiang Mei-hui				not played
5	(China) (Chinese Taipei)	Chen Qingchen / Tang Yuanting; Chen Hsiao-huan / Hsu Ya-ching				not played

Denmark
0
Kunshan Sports Centre, Court 3
19 May 2016
19:00

Japan
3

			1	2	3
1	(Denmark) (Japan)	Line Kjaersfeldt; Nozomi Okuhara	11; 21	18; 21
2	(Denmark) (Japan)	Christinna Pedersen / Kamilla Rytter Juhl; Misaki Matsutomo / Ayaka Takahashi	21; 23	16; 21
3	(Denmark) (Japan)	Mette Poulsen; Akane Yamaguchi	15; 21	11; 21
4	(Denmark) (Japan)	Line Kjaersfeldt / Sara Thygesen; Naoko Fukuman / Kurumi Yonao				not played
5	(Denmark) (Japan)	Anna Thea Madsen; Sayaka Sato				not played

==== Semifinals ====
China
3
Kunshan Sports Centre, Court 1
20 May 2016
13:00

India
0

			1	2	3
1	(China) (India)	Li Xuerui; Saina Nehwal	21; 15	12; 21	21; 17
2	(China) (India)	Wang Shixian; Pusarla Venkata Sindhu	21; 13	23; 21
3	(China) (India)	Tian Qing / Zhao Yunlei; Jwala Gutta / Sikki Reddy Nelakurthi	21; 6	21; 6
4	(China) (India)	Wang Yihan; Ruthvika Shivani Gadde				not played
5	(China) (India)	Chen Qingchen / Tang Yuanting; Ashwini Ponnappa / Pusarla Venkata Sindhu				not played

South Korea
3
Kunshan Sports Centre, Court 2
20 May 2016
19:00

Japan
1

			1	2	3
1	(South Korea) (Japan)	Sung Ji-hyun; Nozomi Okuhara	21; 13	21; 13
2	(South Korea) (Japan)	Jung Kyung-eun / Shin Seung-chan; Misaki Matsutomo / Ayaka Takahashi	21; 19	15; 21	21; 16
3	(South Korea) (Japan)	Bae Yeon-ju; Akane Yamaguchi	17; 21	7; 9		retired
4	(South Korea) (Japan)	Chang Ye-na / Lee So-hee; Naoko Fukuman / Kurumi Yonao	21; 15	21; 14
5	(South Korea) (Japan)	Kim Hyo-min; Sayaka Sato				not played

==== Final ====
China
3
Kunshan Sports Centre, Court 1
21 May 2016
13:00

South Korea
1

			1	2	3
1	(China) (South Korea)	Li Xuerui; Sung Ji-hyun	14; 21	21; 13	21; 10
2	(China) (South Korea)	Tian Qing / Zhao Yunlei; Jung Kyung-eun / Shin Seung-chan	21; 16	17; 21	23; 25
3	(China) (South Korea)	Wang Shixian; Kim Hyo-min	21; 13	21; 12
4	(China) (South Korea)	Tang Yuanting / Chen Qingchen; Chang Ye-na / Lee So-hee	21; 14	21; 16
5	(China) (South Korea)	Wang Yihan; Lee Jang-mi				not played

2016 Uber Cup champion

China
Fourteenth title

=== Final ranking ===
Pos	Team	Pld	W	L	Pts	MD	GD	PD	Final result
1st place, gold medalist(s)	China	6	6	0	6	+23	+42	+419	Champions
2nd place, silver medalist(s)	South Korea	6	5	1	5	+16	+29	+315	Runners-up
3rd place, bronze medalist(s)	Japan	5	4	1	4	+12	+24	+253	Eliminated in semi-finals
3rd place, bronze medalist(s)	India	5	3	2	3	+8	+16	+143	Eliminated in semi-finals
5	Thailand	4	3	1	3	+7	+13	+100	Eliminated in quarter-finals
6	Chinese Taipei	4	2	2	2	+4	+8	+151	Eliminated in quarter-finals
7	Indonesia	4	2	2	2	+2	+6	+61	Eliminated in quarter-finals
8	Denmark	4	2	2	2	−4	−9	−91	Eliminated in quarter-finals
9	Hong Kong	3	1	2	1	−3	−8	−84	Eliminated in group stage
10	Malaysia	3	1	2	1	−5	−7	−71	Eliminated in group stage
11	United States	3	1	2	1	−5	−11	−98	Eliminated in group stage
12	Germany	3	1	2	1	−7	−14	−157	Eliminated in group stage
13	Spain	3	0	3	0	−9	−17	−170	Eliminated in group stage
14	Bulgaria	3	0	3	0	−11	−20	−136	Eliminated in group stage
15	Australia	3	0	3	0	−13	−24	−231	Eliminated in group stage
16	Mauritius	3	0	3	0	−15	−28	−404	Eliminated in group stage
