= Costa Rica International =

Badminton tournament to be held in Costa Rica

The Costa Rica Future Series International is an international badminton tournament held in Costa Rica. The event is part of the Badminton World Federation's Future Series and part of the Badminton Pan America's Circuit.

== Past winners ==
Year	Men's singles	Women's singles	Men's doubles	Women's doubles	Mixed doubles
2020	Cancelled (Note: This tournament, originally to be played from 18 to 22 November, was later postponed due to COVID-19 pandemic in Costa Rica.)				
2021– 2023	No competition				
2024	(Peru) Adriano Viale	(Canada) Chloe Hoang	(Portugal) Bruno Carvalho (Portugal) Diogo Gloria	(Peru) Fernanda Munar (Peru) Rafaela Munar	(Canada) Timothy Lock (Canada) Chloe Hoang
2025	(Guatemala) Kevin Cordón	(Italy) Yasmine Hamza	(Denmark) Emil Langemark (Denmark) Mikkel Langemark	(Spain) Amaia Torralba (Spain) Jana Villanueva	(Spain) Vicente Gázquez (Spain) Amaia Torralba
2026	(United States) Jay Chun	(Colombia) Juliana Giraldo	(Chinese Taipei) Chen Hui-heng (Chinese Taipei) Tseng Sheng-an	(Peru) Ariana Munar (Peru) Fernanda Munar	(Colombia) Jeronimo Giraldo (Colombia) Juliana Giraldo

== Performances by nation ==
As of the 2026 edition

Pos	Nation	MS	WS	MD	WD	XD	Total
1	Peru	1			2		3
2	Canada		1			1	2
2	Colombia		1			1	2
2	Spain				1	1	2
5	Chinese Taipei			1			1
5	Denmark			1			1
5	Guatemala	1					1
5	Italy		1				1
5	Portugal			1			1
5	United States	1					1
Total		3	3	3	3	3	15
