= Katharina Fink =

Italian badminton player

Personal information
- Born: 14 November 2002 (age 23) Bolzano, South Tyrol, Italy

Sport
- Country: Italy
- Sport: Badminton

Women's singles & doubles
- Highest ranking: 124 (WS 20 December 2022); 63 (WD with Yasmine Hamza 15 November 2022)
- BWF profile

Katharina Fink (born 14 November 2002) is an Italian badminton player affiliated with SSV Bozen. She won the National Championships title in 2018. Fink clinched her first senior international title at the 2019 South Africa International in the women's doubles event partnered with Yasmine Hamza. Together with Hamza, they won the silver medal at the 2022 Mediterranean Games.

== Early life ==
Fink was born into a German-speaking region in Italy called South Tyrol. She is half Czech on her mother's side and quarter Swiss, quarter Italian on her father's. Fink began to playing badminton at the age of ten. In her junior career, she trained at the Südtirol Badminton School, and entered top 200 BWF World ranking in the women's doubles event in 2021.

== Achievements ==
=== Mediterranean Games ===
Women's doubles
Year	Venue	Partner	Opponent	Score	Result	Ref.
2022	Multipurpose Omnisports Hall; Oued Tlélat, Algeria	(Italy) Yasmine Hamza	(Turkey) Bengisu Erçetin (Turkey) Nazlıcan İnci	15–21, 18–21	Silver	

=== BWF International Challenge/Series (2 titles, 6 runners-up) ===
Women's singles
Year	Tournament	Opponent	Score	Result
2019	South Africa International	(Mauritius) Kate Foo Kune	16–21, 14–21	(silver) Runner-up

Women's doubles
Year	Tournament	Partner	Opponent	Score	Result
2019	Cyprus International	(Italy) Yasmine Hamza	(Hungary) Daniella Gonda (Hungary) Ágnes Kőrösi	12–21, 21–12, 19–21	(silver) Runner-up
2019	South Africa International	(Italy) Yasmine Hamza	(South Africa) Megan de Beer (South Africa) Johanita Scholtz	16–21, 21–15, 21–16	(gold) Winner
2020	Latvia International	(Italy) Yasmine Hamza	(Estonia) Kati-Kreet Marran (Estonia) Helina Rüütel	11–21, 12–21	(silver) Runner-up
2021	Hellas International	(Italy) Yasmine Hamza	(Malaysia) Low Yeen Yuan (Malaysia) Valeree Siow	15–21, 16–21	(silver) Runner-up
2021	Cyprus International	(Italy) Yasmine Hamza	(Ukraine) Polina Tkach (Ukraine) Tetyana Potapenko	21–10, 11–7 retired	(gold) Winner
2021	El Salvador International	(Italy) Yasmine Hamza	(Brazil) Sania Lima (Brazil) Tamires Santos	12–21, 21–13, 13–21	(silver) Runner-up
2023	Iceland International	(Italy) Yasmine Hamza	(England) Abbygael Harris (England) Annie Lado	13–21, 18–21	(silver) Runner-up

BWF International Challenge tournament
BWF International Series tournament
BWF Future Series tournament

=== BWF Junior International ===
Girls' singles
Year	Tournament	Opponent	Score	Result
2018	Irish Junior Open	(India) Vaishnavi Reddy Jakka	8–21, 10–21	(silver) Runner-up
2019	South Africa Junior International	(Italy) Yasmine Hamza	8–21, 17–21	(silver) Runner-up
2020	Portuguese Junior International	(Italy) Yasmine Hamza	13–21, 19–21	(silver) Runner-up

Girls' doubles
Year	Tournament	Partner	Opponent	Score	Result
2019	Portuguese Junior International	(Italy) Yasmine Hamza	(Italy) Judith Mair (Italy) Chiara Passeri	21–16, 11–21, 17–21	(silver) Runner-up
2019	South Africa Junior International	(Italy) Yasmine Hamza	(South Africa) Amy Ackerman (South Africa) Megan de Beer	21–11, 21–11	(gold) Winner
2020	Lithuanian Junior International	(Italy) Yasmine Hamza	(Spain) Lucía Rodríguez (Spain) Ania Setién	21–19, 21–14	(gold) Winner
2020	Portuguese Junior International	(Italy) Yasmine Hamza	(Portugal) Ana Fernandes (Portugal) Claudia Lourenço	21–6, 21–17	(gold) Winner

BWF Junior International Grand Prix tournament
BWF Junior International Challenge tournament
BWF Junior International Series tournament
BWF Junior Future Series tournament
