= Yasmine Hamza =

Italian badminton player

Personal information
- Born: 16 September 2003 (age 23) Palermo, Sicily, Italy

Sport
- Country: Italy
- Sport: Badminton

Women's singles & doubles
- Highest ranking: 89 (WS, 17 October 2023); 63 (WD with Katharina Fink, 15 November 2022)
- Current ranking: 100 (WS, 18 November 2025)
- BWF profile
Medal record
Women's badminton
Representing Italy
Mediterranean Games
Silver medal – second place	2022 Oran	Women's doubles
Silver medal – second place	2026 Taranto	Women's singles

Yasmine Hamza (born 16 September 2003) is an Italian badminton player affiliated with SSVBozen. She won the National Championships title in 2019 and 2021. Hamza clinched her first senior international title at the 2019 South Africa International in the women's doubles event partnered with Katharina Fink. Together with Fink, they won the silver medal at the 2022 Mediterranean Games.

== Achievements ==
=== Mediterranean Games ===
Women's doubles
Year	Venue	Partner	Opponent	Score	Result	Ref.
2022	Multipurpose Omnisports Hall; Oued Tlélat, Algeria	(Italy) Katharina Fink	(Turkey) Bengisu Erçetin (Turkey) Nazlıcan İnci	15–21, 18–21	Silver	

=== BWF International Challenge/Series (8 titles, 11 runners-up) ===
Women's singles
Year	Tournament	Opponent	Score	Result
2020	Latvia International	(Estonia) Catlyn Kruus	15–21, 16–21	(silver) Runner-up
2021	Cyprus International	(Bulgaria) Hristomira Popovska	20–22, 11–21	(silver) Runner-up
2022	Santo Domingo Open	(Slovenia) Petra Polanc	21–11, 21–9	(gold) Winner
2023	Chile International	(Peru) Inés Castillo	21–10, 21–16	(gold) Winner
2023	Brazil International	(Mauritius) Kate Ludik	21–19, 15–21, 23–25	(silver) Runner-up
2023	Venezuela International	(Peru) Inés Castillo	12–21, 18–21	(silver) Runner-up
2023	Peru International	(Peru) Inés Castillo	21–19, 15–21, 9–21	(silver) Runner-up
2024	Egypt International	(Bulgaria) Stefani Stoeva	10–21, 20–22	(silver) Runner-up
2024	Algeria International	(Malaysia) Loh Zhi Wei	22–20, 21–13	(gold) Winner
2025	Giraldilla International	(France) Romane Cloteaux-Foucault	21–18, 21–14	(gold) Winner
2025	Costa Rica Future Series	(France) Romane Cloteaux-Foucault	21–14, 21–17	(gold) Winner
2025	Zambia International	(Switzerland) Jenjira Stadelmann	7–7 retired	(gold) Winner

Women's doubles
Year	Tournament	Partner	Opponent	Score	Result
2019	Cyprus International	(Italy) Katharina Fink	(Hungary) Daniella Gonda (Hungary) Ágnes Kőrösi	12–21, 21–12, 19–21	(silver) Runner-up
2019	South Africa International	(Italy) Katharina Fink	(South Africa) Megan de Beer (South Africa) Johanita Scholtz	16–21, 21–15, 21–16	(gold) Winner
2020	Latvia International	(Italy) Katharina Fink	(Estonia) Kati-Kreet Marran (Estonia) Helina Rüütel	11–21, 12–21	(silver) Runner-up
2021	Hellas International	(Italy) Katharina Fink	(Malaysia) Low Yeen Yuan (Malaysia) Valeree Siow	15–21, 16–21	(silver) Runner-up
2021	Cyprus International	(Italy) Katharina Fink	(Ukraine) Polina Tkach (Ukraine) Tetyana Potapenko	21–10, 11–7^{r}	(gold) Winner
2021	El Salvador International	(Italy) Katharina Fink	(Brazil) Sania Lima (Brazil) Tamires Santos	12–21, 21–13, 13–21	(silver) Runner-up
2023	Iceland International	(Italy) Katharina Fink	(England) Abbygael Harris (England) Annie Lado	13–21, 18–21	(silver) Runner-up

BWF International Challenge tournament
BWF International Series tournament
BWF Future Series tournament

=== BWF Junior International (7 titles, 2 runners-up ===
Girls' singles
Year	Tournament	Opponent	Score	Result
2018	Hebar Bulgarian U17 International	(Italy) Katharina Fink	6–21, 12–21	(silver) Runner-up
2019	South Africa Junior International	(Italy) Katharina Fink	21-8, 21-17	(gold) Winner
2020	Portuguese Junior International	(Italy) Katharina Fink	21-13, 21-19	(gold) Winner
2021	Bulgarian Junior International	(Bulgaria) Gergana Pavlova	11-21, 21-16, 24-22	(gold) Winner

Girls' doubles
Year	Tournament	Partner	Opponent	Score	Result
2018	Hebar Bulgarian U17 International	(Italy) Katharina Fink	(Bulgaria) Mihaela Chepiseva (Bulgaria) Cvetina Popivanova	21–15, 21-11	(gold) Winner
2019	Portuguese Junior International	(Italy) Katharina Fink	(Italy) Judith Mair (Italy) Chiara Passeri	21–16, 11–21, 17–21	(silver) Runner-up
2019	South Africa Junior International	(Italy) Katharina Fink	(South Africa) Amy Ackerman (South Africa) Megan de Beer	21–11, 21–11	(gold) Winner
2020	Lithuanian Junior International	(Italy) Katharina Fink	(Spain) Lucía Rodríguez (Spain) Ania Setién	21–19, 21–14	(gold) Winner
2020	Portuguese Junior International	(Italy) Katharina Fink	(Portugal) Ana Fernandes (Portugal) Claudia Lourenço	21–6, 21–17	(gold) Winner

BWF Junior International Grand Prix tournament
BWF Junior International Challenge tournament
BWF Junior International Series tournament
BWF Junior Future Series tournament
