= Carlos Longo =

Spanish badminton player (born 1982)

Personal information
- Full name: Carlos Longo Esteban
- Born: 5 February 1982 (age 44) Huelva, Andalusia, Spain

Sport
- Country: Spain
- Sport: Badminton
- Handedness: Right
- Event: Men's singles

Men's singles
- BWF profile

Carlos Longo Esteban (Note: In this Spanish name, the first or paternal surname is Longo and the second or maternal family name is Esteban.) (born 5 February 1982 in Huelva, Andalusia) is a badminton player from Spain. He won his first senior title at the National Championships in 2004 partnered with Rafael Fernández. A year later, he played at the 2005 World Badminton Championships in Anaheim, United States. In the men's singles event he lost in the first round 15–8, 15–5, against Hugi Heimersson of Sweden. In the mixed doubles event, partnering Laura Molina, they lost in the first round due to a Laura Molina's injury. He also played the 2006 World Championships in men's singles, and he was defeated in first round by Roman Spitko of Germany. Longo also won the mixed doubles title at the National Championships in 2009 and 2010 with Haideé Ojeda.

== Achievements ==
=== BWF International Challenge/Series ===
Men's singles
Year	Tournament	Opponent	Score	Result
2008	Mauritius International	(Uganda) Edwin Ekiring	15–21, 21–15, 8–21	(silver) Runner-up
2007	South Africa International	(Iran) Kaveh Mehrabi	21–19, 17–21, 15–21	(silver) Runner-up
2007	Syria International	(India) Arvind Bhat	16–21, 18–21	(silver) Runner-up
2007	Ballarat International	(Spain) Pablo Abián	18–21, 12–21	(silver) Runner-up

Mixed doubles
Year	Tournament	Partner	Opponent	Score	Result
2007	Nouméa International	(Spain) Laura Molina	(New Caledonia) Marc Antoine Desaymoz (New Caledonia) Johanna Kou		(gold) Winner
2007	North Shore City International	(Spain) Laura Molina	(New Zealand) Joe Wu (New Zealand) Belinda Hill	21–15, 21–18	(gold) Winner
2004	Brazil International	(Spain) Laura Molina	(United States) Marc Lai (United States) Melinda Keszthelyi	15–12, 15–6	(gold) Winner

Commonwealth Youth Games tournament
BWF International Series tournament
BWF Future Series tournament
