= Sergio Llopis =

Spanish badminton player (born 1978)

Personal information
- Full name: Sergio Llopis Solís
- Born: 18 August 1978 (age 47) Xàtiva, Valencia, Spain
- Height: 180 cm (5 ft 11 in)

Sport
- Country: Spain
- Sport: Badminton
- Handedness: Right

Men's singles & doubles
- Highest ranking: 15 (in MD with Crespo) (18 November 2004)
- BWF profile

Sergio Llopis Solís (Note: In this Spanish name, the first or paternal surname is Llopis and the second or maternal family name is Solís.) (born 18 August 1978 in Xàtiva, Valencia) is a male badminton player from Spain.

== Career ==
=== 2004 Summer Olympics ===
Llopis played badminton at the 2004 Summer Olympics in the men's singles competition, losing in the round of 32 to Nikhil Kanetkar of India. He also played in the men's doubles with partner José Antonio Crespo. They were defeated in the round of 32 by Lee Dong-soo and Yoo Yong-sung of Korea.

== Major achievements ==
Rank	Event	Date	Venue
Open Championships
1	Men's doubles	2003	Peru International
1	Men's doubles	2003	Brazil International
1	Men's doubles	2003	VI Yonex Southern Panam Classic
National Championships
1	Singles	1998, 2003, 2005	
1	Men's doubles	2002, 2003	
1	Mixed doubles	1997, 1998, 1999, 2000, 2001, 2005, 2006, 2007	
