= 2016 Thomas Cup group stage =

This article lists the complete results of the group stage of the 2016 Thomas Cup in Kunshan, China.

== Group A ==
Team	Pts	Pld	W	L	MF	MA
China	3	3	3	0	15	0
Japan	2	3	2	1	10	5
France	1	3	1	2	5	10
Mexico	0	3	0	3	0	15

=== China vs Mexico ===
China
5
Kunshan Sports Center Stadium Court 1
15 May 2016

Mexico
0

			1	2	3
1	(China) (Mexico)	Chen Long; Lino Munoz	21; 12	21; 7
2	(China) (Mexico)	Tian Houwei; Job Castillo	21; 7	21; 12
3	(China) (Mexico)	Qiao Bin; Luis Ramón Garrido	21; 11	21; 8
4	(China) (Mexico)	Li Junhui / Liu Yuchen; Job Castillo / Lino Munoz	21; 3	21; 9
5	(China) (Mexico)	Hong Wei / Zheng Siwei; Andrés López / Luis Ramón Garrido	21; 12	21; 15

=== Japan vs France ===
Japan
5
Kunshan Sports Center Stadium Court 3
15 May 2016

France
0

			1	2	3
1	(Japan) (France)	Sho Sasaki; Thomas Rouxel	21; 6	17; 21	23; 21
2	(Japan) (France)	Hiroyuki Endo / Kenichi Hayakawa; Baptiste Careme / Ronan Labar	21; 18	25; 23
3	(Japan) (France)	Takuma Ueda; Lucas Claerbout	21; 7	21; 8
4	(Japan) (France)	Takeshi Kamura / Keigo Sonoda; Bastian Kersaudy / Gaetan Mittelheisser	21; 18	21; 13
5	(Japan) (France)	Riichi Takeshita; Lucas Corvee	21; 17	21; 17

=== Japan vs Mexico ===
Japan
5
Kunshan Sports Center Stadium Court 4
16 May 2016

Mexico
0

			1	2	3
1	(Japan) (Mexico)	Takuma Ueda; Lino Munoz	21; 8	21; 9
2	(Japan) (Mexico)	Kazumasa Sakai; Job Castillo	21; 12	21; 9
3	(Japan) (Mexico)	Riichi Takeshita; Luis Ramón Garrido	21; 10	21; 18
4	(Japan) (Mexico)	Takeshi Kamura / Keigo Sonoda; Job Castillo / Lino Munoz	21; 8	21; 6
5	(Japan) (Mexico)	Takuro Hoki / Yugo Kobayashi; Andrés López / Luis Ramón Garrido	21; 8	21; 10

=== China vs France ===
China
5
Kunshan Sports Center Stadium Court 1
16 May 2016

France
0

			1	2	3
1	(China) (France)	Chen Long; Thomas Rouxel	21; 9	21; 12
2	(China) (France)	Fu Haifeng / Zhang Nan; Ronan Labar / Gaetan Mittelheisser	21; 16	22; 20
3	(China) (France)	Lin Dan; Lucas Claerbout	20; 22	21; 14	21; 8
4	(China) (France)	Li Junhui / Zheng Siwei; Bastian Kersaudy / Julien Maio	21; 9	21; 11
5	(China) (France)	Tian Houwei; Lucas Corvee	21; 17	21; 12

=== France vs Mexico ===
France
5
Kunshan Sports Center Stadium Court 3
18 May 2016

Mexico
0

			1	2	3
1	(France) (Mexico)	Thomas Rouxel; Lino Munoz	20; 22	21; 15	21; 14
2	(France) (Mexico)	Lucas Claerbout; Job Castillo	21; 13	21; 9
3	(France) (Mexico)	Lucas Corvee; Luis Ramón Garrido	21; 10	14; 21	21; 18
4	(France) (Mexico)	Ronan Labar / Gaetan Mittelheisser; Job Castillo / Lino Munoz	21; 6	21; 16
5	(France) (Mexico)	Bastian Kersaudy / Julien Maio; Andrés López / Luis Ramón Garrido	21; 14	21; 12

=== China vs Japan ===
China
5
Kunshan Sports Center Stadium Court 1
18 May 2016

Japan
0

			1	2	3
1	(China) (Japan)	Chen Long; Sho Sasaki	20; 22	21; 17	21; 12
2	(China) (Japan)	Fu Haifeng / Zhang Nan; Hiroyuki Endo / Kenichi Hayakawa	21; 19	25; 27	21; 15
3	(China) (Japan)	Lin Dan; Takuma Ueda	21; 18	21; 8
4	(China) (Japan)	Li Junhui / Zheng Siwei; Takeshi Kamura / Keigo Sonoda	21; 18	21; 18
5	(China) (Japan)	Tian Houwei; Riichi Takeshita	21; 23	21; 17	21; 11

== Group B ==
Team	Pts	Pld	W	L	MF	MA
Indonesia	3	3	3	0	14	1
Hong Kong	2	3	2	1	7	8
Thailand	1	3	1	2	5	10
India	0	3	0	3	4	11

=== India vs Thailand ===
India
2
Kunshan Sports Center Stadium Court 1
15 May 2016

Thailand
3

			1	2	3
1	(India) (Thailand)	Ajay Jayaram; Tanongsak Saensomboonsuk	16; 21	21; 12	14; 21
2	(India) (Thailand)	Manu Attri / B. Sumeeth Reddy; Bodin Issara / Nipitphon Puangpuapech	17; 21	6; 21
3	(India) (Thailand)	B. Sai Praneeth; Khosit Phetpradab	21; 11	21; 16
4	(India) (Thailand)	Akshay Dewalkar / Satwiksairaj Rankireddy; Dechapol Puavaranukroh / Kittinupong Kedren	15; 21	21; 14	15; 21
5	(India) (Thailand)	Sourabh Varma; Adulrach Namkul	21; 17	16; 21	21; 19

=== Indonesia vs Hong Kong ===
Indonesia
5
Kunshan Sports Center Stadium Court 2
15 May 2016

Hong Kong
0

			1	2	3
1	(Indonesia) (Hong Kong)	Tommy Sugiarto; Ng Ka Long	21; 17	22; 20
2	(Indonesia) (Hong Kong)	Mohammad Ahsan / Hendra Setiawan; Or Chin Chung / Tang Chun Man	22; 20	22; 20
3	(Indonesia) (Hong Kong)	Jonatan Christie; Hu Yun	22; 20	21; 18
4	(Indonesia) (Hong Kong)	Angga Pratama / Ricky Karanda Suwardi; Law Cheuk Him / Lee Chun Hei	21; 16	21; 17
5	(Indonesia) (Hong Kong)	Ihsan Maulana Mustofa; Wong Wing Ki	21; 15	22; 20

=== India vs Hong Kong ===
India
2
Kunshan Sports Center Stadium Court 4
17 May 2016

Hong Kong
3

			1	2	3
1	(India) (Hong Kong)	Ajay Jayaram; Ng Ka Long	13; 21	12; 21
2	(India) (Hong Kong)	Manu Attri / B. Sumeeth Reddy; Or Chin Chung / Tang Chun Man	19; 21	12; 21
3	(India) (Hong Kong)	B. Sai Praneeth; Hu Yun	23; 21	23; 21
4	(India) (Hong Kong)	Satwiksairaj Rankireddy / Chirag Shetty; Chan Tsz Kit / Law Cheuk Him	10; 21	11; 21
5	(India) (Hong Kong)	Sourabh Varma; Wei Nan	17; 21	21; 19	21; 9

=== Indonesia vs Thailand ===
Indonesia
4
Kunshan Sports Center Stadium Court 2
17 May 2016

Thailand
1

			1	2	3
1	(Indonesia) (Thailand)	Tommy Sugiarto; Tanongsak Saensomboonsuk	24; 22	21; 18
2	(Indonesia) (Thailand)	Angga Pratama / Ricky Karanda Suwardi; Kittinupong Kedren / Nipitphon Puangpuapech	20; 22	21; 10	21; 12
3	(Indonesia) (Thailand)	Jonatan Christie; Khosit Phetpradab	15; 21	21; 8	21; 17
4	(Indonesia) (Thailand)	Marcus Fernaldi Gideon / Kevin Sanjaya Sukamuljo; Dechapol Puavaranukroh / Bodin Issara	14; 21	21; 11	17; 21
5	(Indonesia) (Thailand)	Anthony Sinisuka Ginting; Adulrach Namkul	21; 18	21; 19

=== Indonesia vs India ===
Indonesia
5
Kunshan Sports Center Stadium Court 2
18 May 2016

India
0

			1	2	3
1	(Indonesia) (India)	Jonatan Christie; Ajay Jayaram	21; 14	21; 12
2	(Indonesia) (India)	Angga Pratama / Ricky Karanda Suwardi; Manu Attri / Akshay Dewalkar	21; 18	21; 17
3	(Indonesia) (India)	Anthony Sinisuka Ginting; B. Sai Praneeth	18; 21	21; 11	21; 15
4	(Indonesia) (India)	Marcus Fernaldi Gideon / Hendra Setiawan; B. Sumeeth Reddy / Satwiksairaj Rankireddy	21; 9	21; 18
5	(Indonesia) (India)	Ihsan Maulana Mustofa; Sourabh Varma	21; 10	20; 22	21; 13

=== Thailand vs Hong Kong ===
Thailand
1
Kunshan Sports Center Stadium Court 4
18 May 2016

Hong Kong
4

			1	2	3
1	(Thailand) (Hong Kong)	Tanongsak Saensomboonsuk; Ng Ka Long	12; 21	11; 21
2	(Thailand) (Hong Kong)	Dechapol Puavaranukroh / Kittinupong Kedren; Or Chin Chung / Tang Chun Man	11; 21	21; 13	13; 21
3	(Thailand) (Hong Kong)	Khosit Phetpradab; Hu Yun	19; 21	12; 21
4	(Thailand) (Hong Kong)	Tinn Isriyanate / Nipitphon Puangpuapech; Chan Tsz Kit / Law Cheuk Him	21; 15	21; 18
5	(Thailand) (Hong Kong)	Adulrach Namkul; Wei Nan	17; 21	16; 21

== Group C ==
Team	Pts	Pld	W	L	MF	MA
Malaysia	3	3	3	0	12	3
South Korea	2	3	2	1	12	3
England	1	3	1	2	5	10
Germany	0	3	0	3	1	14

=== Korea vs Germany ===
South Korea
5
Kunshan Sports Center Stadium Court 4
15 May 2016

Germany
0

			1	2	3
1	(South Korea) (Germany)	Son Wan-ho; Marc Zwiebler	21; 13	21; 9
2	(South Korea) (Germany)	Kim Gi-jung / Kim Sa-rang; Fabian Holzer / Johannes Pistorius	21; 6	21; 7
3	(South Korea) (Germany)	Jeon Hyeok-jin; Kai Schaefer	21; 9	21; 18
4	(South Korea) (Germany)	Ko Sung-hyun / Shin Baek-cheol; Mark Lamsfuss / Josche Zurwonne	21; 16	21; 13
5	(South Korea) (Germany)	Heo Kwang-hee; Lars Schaenzler	21; 10	21; 18

=== Malaysia vs England ===
Malaysia
4
Kunshan Sports Center Stadium Court 4
15 May 2016

England
1

			1	2	3
1	(Malaysia) (England)	Lee Chong Wei; Toby Penty	21; 15	21; 11
2	(Malaysia) (England)	Goh V Shem / Tan Wee Kiong; Marcus Ellis / Chris Langridge	21; 12	21; 17
3	(Malaysia) (England)	Chong Wei Feng; Sam Parsons	21; 10	21; 10
4	(Malaysia) (England)	Koo Kien Keat / Tan Boon Heong; Peter Briggs / Tom Wolfenden	18; 21	21; 13	17; 21
5	(Malaysia) (England)	Goh Soon Huat; Alex Lane	21; 15	19; 21	21; 13

=== Malaysia vs Germany ===
Malaysia
5
Kunshan Sports Center Stadium Court 2
16 May 2016

Germany
0

			1	2	3
1	(Malaysia) (Germany)	Lee Chong Wei; Kai Schaefer	21; 19	21; 15
2	(Malaysia) (Germany)	Goh V Shem / Tan Wee Kiong; Richard Domke / Fabian Holzer	21; 12	21; 11
3	(Malaysia) (Germany)	Iskandar Zulkarnain Zainuddin; Lars Schaenzler	21; 7	21; 16
4	(Malaysia) (Germany)	Koo Kien Keat / Tan Boon Heong; Mark Lamsfuss / Josche Zurwonne	21; 15	21; 10
5	(Malaysia) (Germany)	Chong Wei Feng; David Peng	21; 9	21; 18

=== Korea vs England ===
South Korea
5
Kunshan Sports Center Stadium Court 4
16 May 2016

England
0

			1	2	3
1	(South Korea) (England)	Son Wan-ho; Rajiv Ouseph	21; 19	21; 19
2	(South Korea) (England)	Lee Yong-dae / Yoo Yeon-seong; Marcus Ellis / Chris Langridge	21; 11	21; 12
3	(South Korea) (England)	Lee Dong-keun; Toby Penty	22; 20	21; 18
4	(South Korea) (England)	Ko Sung-hyun / Shin Baek-cheol; Matthew Nottingham / Harley Towler	22; 20	21; 8
5	(South Korea) (England)	Jeon Hyeok-jin; Sam Parsons	21; 6	21; 10

=== Korea vs Malaysia ===
South Korea
2
Kunshan Sports Center Stadium Court 1
17 May 2016

Malaysia
3

			1	2	3
1	(South Korea) (Malaysia)	Son Wan-ho; Lee Chong Wei	18; 21	15; 21
2	(South Korea) (Malaysia)	Lee Yong-dae / Yoo Yeon-seong; Goh V Shem / Koo Kien Keat	21; 16	21; 11
3	(South Korea) (Malaysia)	Lee Dong-keun; Iskandar Zulkarnain Zainuddin	17; 21	15; 21
4	(South Korea) (Malaysia)	Kim Gi-jung / Kim Sa-rang; Tan Boon Heong / Tan Wee Kiong	21; 14	24; 22
5	(South Korea) (Malaysia)	Jeon Hyeok-jin; Chong Wei Feng	16; 21	16; 21

=== England vs Germany ===
England
4
Kunshan Sports Center Stadium Court 4
17 May 2016

Germany
1

			1	2	3
1	(England) (Germany)	Rajiv Ouseph; Kai Schaefer	21; 14	21; 9
2	(England) (Germany)	Marcus Ellis / Chris Langridge; Fabian Holzer / Johannes Pistorius	21; 10	21; 6
3	(England) (Germany)	Toby Penty; Lars Schaenzler	21; 11	21; 5
4	(England) (Germany)	Peter Briggs / Tom Wolfenden; Mark Lamsfuss / Josche Zurwonne	18; 21	15; 21
5	(England) (Germany)	Alex Lane; David Peng	21; 18	21; 6

== Group D ==
Team	Pts	Pld	W	L	MF	MA
Denmark	3	3	3	0	13	2
Chinese Taipei	2	3	2	1	12	3
New Zealand	1	3	1	2	4	11
South Africa	0	3	0	3	1	14

=== Denmark vs South Africa ===
Denmark
5
Kunshan Sports Center Stadium Court 1
16 May 2016

South Africa
0

			1	2	3
1	(Denmark) (South Africa)	Viktor Axelsen; Jacob Maliekal	21; 14	21; 11
2	(Denmark) (South Africa)	Jan Ø. Jørgensen; Cameron Coetzer	21; 9	21; 9
3	(Denmark) (South Africa)	Hans-Kristian Vittinghus; Andries Malan	21; 7	21; 7
4	(Denmark) (South Africa)	Kim Astrup / Anders Skaarup Rasmussen; Cameron Coetzer / Jacob Maliekal	21; 13	21; 16
5	(Denmark) (South Africa)	Mads Conrad-Petersen / Mads Pieler Kolding; Andries Malan / Willem Viljoen	21; 8	21; 17

=== Chinese Taipei vs New Zealand ===
Chinese Taipei
5
Kunshan Sports Center Stadium Court 3
16 May 2016

New Zealand
0

			1	2	3
1	(Chinese Taipei) (New Zealand)	Chou Tien-chen; Dylan Soedjasa	21; 14	21; 6
2	(Chinese Taipei) (New Zealand)	Hsu Jen-hao; Niccolo Tagle	21; 7	21; 12
3	(Chinese Taipei) (New Zealand)	Wang Tzu-wei; Asher Richardson	21; 8	21; 8
4	(Chinese Taipei) (New Zealand)	Lee Sheng-mu / Tsai Chia-hsin; Kevin Dennerly-Minturn / Oliver Leydon-Davis	21; 13	21; 12
5	(Chinese Taipei) (New Zealand)	Chen Hung-ling / Wang Chi-lin; Asher Richardson / Niccolo Tagle	21; 11	21; 17

=== Denmark vs New Zealand ===
Denmark
5
Kunshan Sports Center Stadium Court 2
17 May 2016

New Zealand
0

			1	2	3
1	(Denmark) (New Zealand)	Viktor Axelsen; Dylan Soedjasa	21; 10	21; 6
2	(Denmark) (New Zealand)	Hans-Kristian Vittinghus; Niccolo Tagle	21; 10	21; 13
3	(Denmark) (New Zealand)	Emil Holst; Asher Richardson	21; 16	21; 8
4	(Denmark) (New Zealand)	Kim Astrup / Anders Skaarup Rasmussen; Kevin Dennerly-Minturn / Oliver Leydon-Davis	21; 13	21; 16
5	(Denmark) (New Zealand)	Mathias Boe / Mathias Christiansen; Asher Richardson / Dylan Soedjasa	21; 5	21; 13

=== Chinese Taipei vs South Africa ===
Chinese Taipei
5
Kunshan Sports Center Stadium Court 3
17 May 2016

South Africa
0

			1	2	3
1	(Chinese Taipei) (South Africa)	Chou Tien-chen; Jacob Maliekal	21; 14	22; 20
2	(Chinese Taipei) (South Africa)	Wang Tzu-wei; Cameron Coetzer	21; 6	21; 7
3	(Chinese Taipei) (South Africa)	Lin Yu-hsien; Andries Malan	21; 9	21; 6
4	(Chinese Taipei) (South Africa)	Chen Hung-ling / Wang Chi-lin; Cameron Coetzer / Willem Viljoen	21; 4	21; 9
5	(Chinese Taipei) (South Africa)	Lee Jhe-huei / Lee Yang; Andries Malan / Jacob Maliekal	21; 9	26; 24

=== Denmark vs Chinese Taipei ===
Denmark
3
Kunshan Sports Center Stadium Court 1
18 May 2016

Chinese Taipei
2

			1	2	3
1	(Denmark) (Chinese Taipei)	Viktor Axelsen; Chou Tien-chen	21; 16	21; 13
2	(Denmark) (Chinese Taipei)	Mads Conrad-Petersen / Mads Pieler Kolding; Lee Sheng-mu / Tsai Chia-hsin	22; 20	21; 9
3	(Denmark) (Chinese Taipei)	Jan Ø. Jørgensen; Hsu Jen-hao	21; 13	16; 21	19; 21
4	(Denmark) (Chinese Taipei)	Mathias Boe / Mathias Christiansen; Chen Hung-ling / Wang Chi-lin	21; 17	19; 21	21; 17
5	(Denmark) (Chinese Taipei)	Hans-Kristian Vittinghus; Wang Tzu-wei	13; 21	21; 19	23; 25

=== New Zealand vs South Africa ===
New Zealand
4
Kunshan Sports Center Stadium Court 3
18 May 2016

South Africa
1

			1	2	3
1	(New Zealand) (South Africa)	Dylan Soedjasa; Jacob Maliekal	14; 21	12; 21
2	(New Zealand) (South Africa)	Niccolo Tagle; Cameron Coetzer	21; 17	21; 14
3	(New Zealand) (South Africa)	Asher Richardson; Andries Malan	17; 21	21; 14	21; 11
4	(New Zealand) (South Africa)	Kevin Dennerly-Minturn / Oliver Leydon-Davis; Andries Malan / Willem Viljoen	21; 15	21; 17
5	(New Zealand) (South Africa)	Asher Richardson / Niccolo Tagle; Cameron Coetzer / Jacob Maliekal	16; 21	21; 13	21; 16
