= Dolores Marco =

Spanish badminton player (born 1973)

Personal information
- Full name: Dolores Marco Gómez
- Born: 29 August 1973 (age 53)

Sport
- Country: Spain
- Sport: Badminton
- Handedness: Right
- BWF profile

Dolores Marco Gómez (Note: In this Spanish name, the first or paternal surname is Marco and the second or maternal family name is Gómez.) (born 29 August 1973) is a badminton player from Spain.

== Career ==
Marco played at the 1991, 1995, 1997, 1999 and 2001 World Badminton Championships.

=== National Championships ===
Marco is the most successful player ever in the Spanish National Badminton Championships, with 24 titles, 9 of them in women's singles, 9 in women's doubles and 6 in mixed doubles.
