= Agnese Allegrini =

Italian badminton player (born 1982)

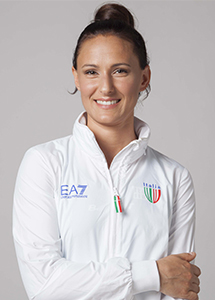

Personal information
- Born: 3 July 1982 (age 44) Rome, Italy
- Height: 1.63 m (5 ft 4 in)
- Weight: 58 kg (128 lb; 9.1 st)

Sport
- Country: Italy
- Sport: Badminton

Women's singles
- Highest ranking: 33 (3 May 2012)
- BWF profile

Agnese Allegrini (born 3 July 1982 in Rome) is a badminton player from Italy.

== Biography ==
Allegrini played at the 2005 World Badminton Championships and reached the second round, where she lost to Eriko Hirose of Japan.

She played at the 2008 Olympic Games in Beijing, where she lost in the first round to the Ukrainian player Larisa Griga. She was the first ever Italian badminton player to compete in the Olympic Games.

== Achievements ==
=== BWF International Challenge/Series ===
Women's singles
Year	Tournament	Opponent	Score	Result
2011	Denmark International	(Russia) Anastasia Prokopenko	15–21, 15–21	(silver) Runner-up
2011	Bahrain International	(Switzerland) Sabrina Jaquet	14–21, 21–14, 21–17	(gold) Winner
2010	Botswana International	(South Africa) Stacey Doubell	21–10, 21–8	(gold) Winner
2010	South Africa International	(Turkey) Özge Bayrak	14–21, 21–11, 21–10	(gold) Winner
2010	Miami PanAm International	(Germany) Nicole Grether	21–16, 21–17	(gold) Winner
2010	Puerto Rico International	(Canada) Joyceline Ko	21–18, 21–18	(gold) Winner
2010	Santo Domingo Open	(Portugal) Telma Santos	11–21, 21–23	(silver) Runner-up
2010	Fiji International	(New Caledonia) Johanna Kou	21–3, 21–4	(gold) Winner
2010	Tahiti International	(United States) Cee Nantana Ketpura	16–21, 18–21	(silver) Runner-up
2010	Nouméa International	(Mexico) Deyanira Angulo	21–6, 21–10	(gold) Winner
2008	Iran Fajr International	(Portugal) Telma Santos	21–10, 16–21, 21–19	(gold) Winner
2008	Uganda International	(Peru) Claudia Rivero	22–20, 21–10	(gold) Winner
2007	Mauritius International	(Slovenia) Maja Tvrdy	18–21, 21–9, 22–20	(gold) Winner
2007	Giraldilla International	(Cuba) Solangel Guzman	21–11, 21–13	(gold) Winner
2007	Bahrain International	(India) Trupti Murgunde	21–11, 21–18	(gold) Winner
2006	Mauritius International	(Nigeria) Grace Daniel	21–19, 21–14	(gold) Winner
2006	Southern PanAm International	(Finland) Nina Weckstrom		(silver) Runner-up
2006	Peru International	(Spain) Yoana Martinez	21–14, 21–12	(gold) Winner
2006	Giraldilla International	(Spain) Yoana Martinez		(gold) Winner
2005	Giraldilla International	(Spain) Yoana Martinez	11–9, 11–9	(gold) Winner
2003	Italian International	(Denmark) Line Isberg	11–5, 11–3	(gold) Winner
2001	Italian International	(Italy) Erika Stich	7–1, 7–3, 8–6	(gold) Winner
2001	Puerto Rico International	(United States) Elie Wu	11–3, 11–2	(gold) Winner
2001	Brazil International	(United States) Mesinee Mangkalakiri	11–4, 11–2	(gold) Winner

Women’s doubles
Year	Tournament	Partner	Opponent	Score	Result
2004	Hungarian International	(Italy) Hui Ding	(Malaysia) Lim Pek Siah (Malaysia) Chor Hooi Yee	4–15, 3–15	(silver) Runner-up
2003	Italian International	(Italy) Federica Panini	(Denmark) Louise Ibsen (Denmark) Karina Sørensen		(gold) Winner
2001	Brazil International	(Italy) Federica Panini	(Italy) Maria Luisa Mur (Italy) Silene Zoia		(gold) Winner

BWF International Challenge tournament
BWF International Series tournament
BWF Future Series tournament
