= Erika Stich =

Italian badminton player (born 1967)

Personal information
- Born: Erika Henriete Stich; 15 December 1967 (age 58)

Sport
- Country: Italy
- Sport: Badminton
- Event: Women's singles & doubles

Erika Henriete Stich (born 15 December 1967) is an Italian badminton player originally from Romania. Stich collected seven Romanian National Championship titles, including three in women's singles and doubles, and one in mixed doubles. She also won the international title at the 1992 Romanian International tournament in the mixed doubles event partnered with Emerik Balazs, becoming the only Romanian women's player to win the competition. Stich married Csaba Hamza, a badminton technical director, and lives in Bolzano. Her child, Yasmine Hamza, also plays badminton for SSV Bozen.

Stich was the bronze medalist at the European Senior Championships in the women's singles event in 2010 and 2012 (master 40 category), as well as in 2016 (master 45 category). In 2018, she emerged as the women's singles +50 champion, in Guadalajara, Spain.

== Achievements ==
=== IBF International ===
Women's singles

Year	Tournament	Opponent	Score	Result
2001	Italian International	(Italy) Agnese Allegrini	1–7, 2–7, 1–7	(silver) Runner-up
1994	Italian International	(Italy) Yu Yu Wang	3–11, 2–11	(silver) Runner-up

Mixed doubles

Year	Tournament	Partner	Opponent	Score	Result
1995	Italian International	(China) Shen Yifeng	(Italy) Yu Yu Wang (Italy) You Zhou	8–15, 10–15	(silver) Runner-up
1992	Romanian International	(Romania) Emerik Balazs			(gold) Winner
