= Yoana Martínez =

Spanish badminton player (born 1980)

Personal information
- Born: Yoana Martínez Barbero; 18 November 1980 (age 45) San Sebastián, Spain
- Height: 1.69 m (5 ft 7 in)
- Weight: 60 kg (132 lb; 9 st 6 lb)

Sport
- Country: Spain
- Sport: Badminton
- Handedness: Right
- Event: Women's singles

Women's singles
- BWF profile

Yoana Martínez Barbero (Note: In this Spanish name, the first or paternal surname is Martínez and the second or maternal family name is Barbero.) (born 18 November 1980) is a Spanish badminton player. Martínez played at the 2001 World Badminton Championships where she was defeated by Nicole Grether in the first round. In 2004, she won her first senior national title in the women's singles and doubles event. In 2006, she qualified to compete at the World Championships, but was defeated by Xu Huaiwen of Germany in the second round. Martínez competed in badminton at the 2008 Summer Olympics in women's singles. She beat Erin Carroll in the first round and was defeated in the second round by Maria Kristin Yulianti.

== Achievements ==
=== BWF International Challenge/Series ===
Women's singles
Year	Tournament	Opponent	Score	Result
2008	Mauritius International	(Nigeria) Grace Daniel	15–21, 18–21	(silver) Runner-up
2008	Kenya International	(Portugal) Ana Moura	21–19, 14–21, 19–21	(silver) Runner-up
2007	Ecuador International	(Portugal) Filipa Lamy	21–16, 21–11	(gold) Winner
2006	Peru International	(Italy) Agnese Allegrini	14–21, 12–21	(silver) Runner-up
2006	Giraldilla International	(Italy) Agnese Allegrini		(silver) Runner-up
2005	Giraldilla International	(Italy) Agnese Allegrini	9–11, 9–11	(silver) Runner-up
2000	Hungarian International	(Slovenia) Maja Pohar	5–11, 0–11	(silver) Runner-up

Women's doubles
Year	Tournament	Partner	Opponent	Score	Result
2004	Spanish International	(Spain) Lucía Tavera	(Spain) Alicia Calonge (Spain) Silvia Riera	15–7, 15–12	(gold) Winner
2000	Hungarian International	(Spain) Mercedes Cuenca	(Austria) Verena Fastenbauer (Austria) Karina Lengauer	15–12, 15–12	(gold) Winner

Mixed doubles
Year	Tournament	Partner	Opponent	Score	Result
2005	Giraldilla International	(Spain) José Antonio Crespo	(Canada) Philippe Bourret (Canada) Helen Nichol	15–5, 15–5	(gold) Winner
2005	Miami PanAm International	(Spain) José Antonio Crespo	(Canada) Mike Beres (Canada) Jody Patrick	11–15, 10–15	(silver) Runner-up

Commonwealth Youth Games tournament
BWF International Series tournament
BWF Future Series tournament
