= Nicolás Escartín =

Spanish badminton player (born 1980)

Personal information
- Born: Nicolás Escartín Ara; 19 August 1980 (age 45) Huesca, Aragón, Spain
- Height: 182 cm (6 ft 0 in)

Sport
- Country: Spain
- Sport: Badminton
- Handedness: Right
- Event: Men's doubles

Men's doubles
- BWF profile

Nicolás Escartín Ara (Note: In this Spanish name, the first or paternal surname is Escartín and the second or maternal family name is Ara.) (born 19 August 1980, in Huesca, Aragón) is a male double's badminton player from Spain. He won multiple significant competitions. He was recognised for his achievements by being recognised as the most successful Aragonese athlete of 2006.

== Major achievements ==
| Rank | Event | Date | Venue |
|---|---|---|---|
International Championships
| 1 | Men's doubles | 2002 | Brazil Taca São Paulo International |
| 1 | Men's doubles | 2002 | Italian International |
| 1 | Men's doubles | 2005 | Cuba ´Giraldilla` International |
National Championships
| 1 | Men's doubles | 2005, 2006, 2007 | |
