= Lorena Uslé =

Spanish badminton player (born 1994)

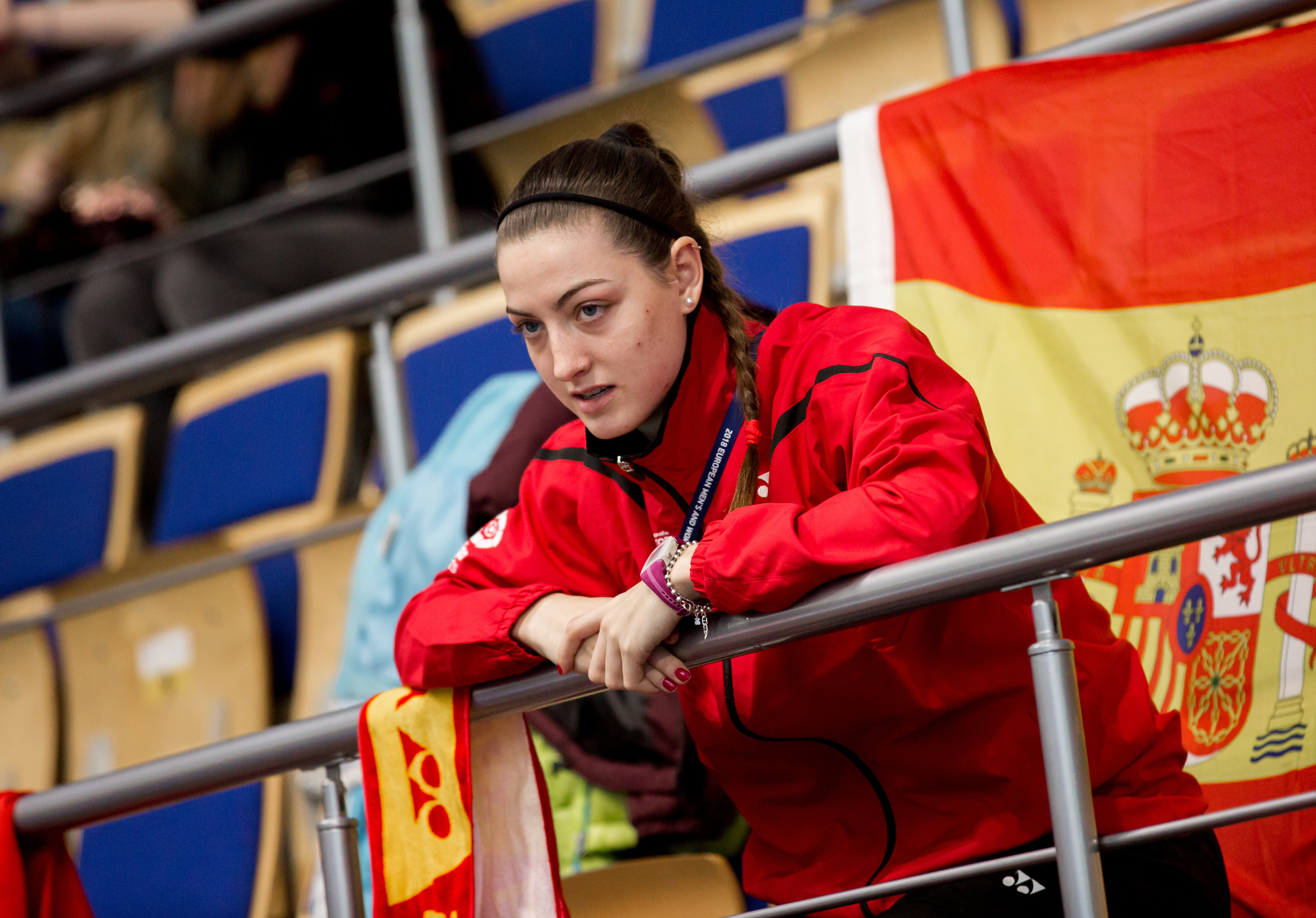
- Uslé at the 2018 Kazan European women's team championships

Personal information
- Full name: Lorena Uslé Vejo
- Born: 16 February 1994 (age 32) Solares, Cantabria, Spain
- Height: 1.67 m (5 ft 6 in)
- Weight: 62 kg (137 lb)

Sport
- Country: Spain
- Sport: Badminton

Women's & mixed doubles
- Highest ranking: 160 (WD with Claudia Leal 26 March 2019); 85 (XD with Alberto Zapico 5 November 2019)
- BWF profile
Medal record
Women's badminton
Representing Spain
European Women's Team Championships
Bronze medal – third place	2016 Kazan	Women's team
Bronze medal – third place	2018 Kazan	Women's team

Lorena Uslé Vejo (Note: In this Spanish name, the first or paternal surname is Uslé and the second or maternal family name is Vejo.) (born 16 February 1994) is a Spanish badminton player. Trained at the Oviedo badminton club, she won three mixed doubles title at the Spanish National Championships partnered with Alberto Zapico. She was part of Spanish team that won the bronze medal at the 2016 and 2018 European Women's Team Championships.

== Career ==
Uslé started to playing badminton at the age of 8 in Cantabria. At 16, she received an internship scholarship at the Technification Center of Asturias, in Oviedo, where she is currently training.

She competed at the 2018 Mediterranean Games and 2019 European Games.

== Achievements ==
=== BWF International Challenge/Series (3 runners-up) ===
Women's doubles
Year	Tournament	Partner	Opponent	Score	Result
2021	Spanish International	(Spain) Paula López	(Netherlands) Alyssa Tirtosentono (Netherlands) Imke van der Aar	11–21, 19–21	(silver) Runner-up

Mixed doubles
Year	Tournament	Partner	Opponent	Score	Result
2019	Slovak Open	(Spain) Alberto Zapico	(Thailand) Supak Jomkoh (Thailand) Supissara Paewsampran	18–21, 14–21	(silver) Runner-up
2019	Croatian International	(Spain) Alberto Zapico	(Denmark) Emil Lauritzen (Denmark) Iben Bergstein	21–19, 12–21, 16–21	(silver) Runner-up

BWF International Challenge tournament
BWF International Series tournament
BWF Future Series tournament

=== BWF Junior International (1 title) ===
Girls' doubles
Year	Tournament	Partner	Opponent	Score	Result
2013	Spanish Junior International	(Spain) Nelly Iriberri	(England) Kerri Scott (England) Claire Weaver	21–10, 21–12	(gold) Winner

BWF Junior International Grand Prix tournament
BWF Junior International Challenge tournament
BWF Junior International Series tournament
BWF Junior Future Series tournament
