= Klaus Raffeiner =

Italian badminton player (born 1977)

Personal information
- Born: 28 November 1977 (age 48) Melito di Porto Salvo, Italy

Sport
- Country: Italy
- Sport: Badminton
- Handedness: Right
- Event: Men's singles & doubles

Men's singles & doubles
- BWF profile

Klaus Raffeiner (born 28 November 1977) is an Italian badminton player. He is from Melito di Porto Salvo in the Metropolitan City of Reggio Calabria.

== Career ==
Raffeiner played the 2007 BWF World Championships in the men's singles, and was defeated in the first round by Simon Maunoury, of France, 23–21, 21–16. In his home country he won the Italian National Championships eleven times in a row.
