= Laura Molina (badminton) =

Spanish badminton player (born 1988)

Personal information
- Born: Laura Molina Fernández; 13 September 1988 (age 38) La Rinconada, Spain
- Height: 1.74 m (5 ft 9 in)
- Weight: 68 kg (150 lb)

Sport
- Country: Spain
- Sport: Badminton
- Coached by: Antonio Molina

Women's & mixed doubles
- Highest ranking: 248 (WS 22 April 2010); 90 (WD 17 September 2015); 267 (XD 29 September 2011)
- BWF profile
Medal record
Women's badminton
Representing Spain
European Women's Team Championships
Bronze medal – third place	2016 Kazan	Women's team

Laura Molina Fernández (Note: In this Spanish name, the first or paternal surname is Molina and the second or maternal family name is Fernández.) (born 13 September 1988) is a Spanish badminton player.

She played at the 2005 World Badminton Championships in Anaheim. In the women's singles event she retired in her first round match. She trailed Yip Pui Yin of Hong Kong 1–11, 0-7 when she decided to end the match. In the mixed doubles event (partnering Carlos Longo) she also lost in the first round.

== Achievements ==
=== BWF International Challenge/Series ===
Mixed doubles
Year	Tournament	Partner	Opponent	Score	Result
2007	Nouméa International	(Spain) Carlos Longo	(New Caledonia) Marc Antoine Desaymoz (New Caledonia) Johanna Kou		(gold) Winner
2007	North Shore City International	(Spain) Carlos Longo	(New Zealand) Joe Wu (New Zealand) Belinda Hill	21–15, 21–18	(gold) Winner
2004	Brazil International	(Spain) Carlos Longo	(United States) Marc Lai (United States) Melinda Keszthelyi	15–12, 15–6	(gold) Winner

Commonwealth Youth Games tournament
BWF International Series tournament
BWF Future Series tournament
