= 2011 Hong Kong Super Series =

Badminton championships

Tournament details
- Dates: 15 – 20 November 2011
- Level: Super Series
- Total prize money: US$250,000
- Location: Hong Kong

Champions
- Men's singles: (China) Lin Dan
- Women's singles: (China) Wang Xin
- Men's doubles: (China) Cai Yun (China) Fu Haifeng
- Women's doubles: (China) Wang Xiaoli (China) Yu Yang
- Mixed doubles: (China) Zhang Nan (China) Zhao Yunlei

The 2011 Hong Kong Super Series was a top level badminton competition contested from November 15, 2011 to November 20, 2011 in Hong Kong. It was the eleventh BWF Super Series competition on the 2011 BWF Super Series schedule. A total of $250,000 was given out as prize money.

== Men's singles ==
=== Seeds ===
1. (Malaysia) Lee Chong Wei
2. (China) Chen Long
3. (China) Lin Dan
4. (Denmark) Peter Gade
5. (China) Chen Jin
6. (Japan) Sho Sasaki
7. (China) Du Pengyu
8. (Germany) Marc Zwiebler

=== Top half ===
First Round
1	(Malaysia) Lee C W	21	21
(Spain) P Abián	13	15
(Denmark) V Axelsen	21	17	21
(Chinese Taipei) Hsu J-h	11	21	15
6	(Japan) S Sasaki	21	18	14
(India) A Jayaram	14	21	21
(Malaysia) M H Hashim	23	21	21
(England) R Ouseph	25	16	18
3	(China) Lin D	16	21	21
(India) K Parupalli	21	17	14
(Hong Kong) Wong W K	22	13	21
(Japan) T Ueda	20	21	10
8	(Germany) M Zwiebler	21	13	21
Q3	(Hong Kong) Wei N	19	21	14
(Denmark) H-K Vittinghus	8	18
(South Korea) Shon W-h	21	21

Second Round
1	(Malaysia) Lee C W	21	21
(Denmark) V Axelsen	15	11
(India) A Jayaram	21	21
(Malaysia) M H Hashim	16	15
3	(China) Lin D	21	21
(Hong Kong) Wong W K	16	16
8	(Germany) M Zwiebler	11	21	14
(South Korea) Shon W-h	21	11	21

Quarterfinals
1	(Malaysia) Lee C W	21	21
(India) A Jayaram	16	13
3	(China) Lin D	21	21
(South Korea) Son W-h	15	18

Semifinals
1	(Malaysia) Lee C W	16	14
3	(China) Lin D	21	21

=== Bottom half ===
First Round
(Japan) K Tago	9	21	15
(Denmark) J Ø Jørgensen	21	17	21
(Hong Kong) Hu Y	21	20	10
5	(China) Chen J	15	22	21
(Denmark) J Persson	14	16
(Japan) K Yamada	21	21
(Guatemala) K Cordón	10	5
4	(Denmark) P Gade	21	21
Q1	(India) R.M.V. Gurusai Datt	21	21
(France) B Leverdez	11	16
(Hong Kong) Chan Y K	16	18
7	(China) Du PY	21	21
Q2	(Chinese Taipei) Chou T-c	18	15
Q4	(India) A Bhat	21	21
(Chinese Taipei) Hsueh H-y	17	7
2	(China) Chen L	21	21

Second Round
(Denmark) J Ø Jørgensen	16	14
5	(China) Chen J	21	21
(Japan) K Yamada	13	21	11
4	(Denmark) P Gade	21	15	21
Q1	(India) R.M.V. Gurusai Datt	15	21	21
7	(China) Du PY	21	7	13
Q4	(India) A Bhat	10	8
2	(China) Chen L	21	21

Quarterfinals
5	(China) Chen J	21	21
4	(Denmark) P Gade	18	13
Q1	(India) R.M.V. Gurusai Datt	13	21
2	(China) Chen L	21	23

Semifinals
5	(China) Chen J	21	21
2	(China) Chen L	14	18

=== Finals ===
Semifinals
1	(Malaysia) Lee Chong Wei	16	14
3	(China) Lin Dan	21	21
5	(China) Chen Jin	21	21
2	(China) Chen Long	14	18

Final
3	(China) Lin Dan	21	21
5	(China) Chen Jin	12	19

== Women's singles ==
=== Seeds ===
1. (China) Wang Yihan
2. (China) Wang Shixian
3. (China) Wang Xin
4. (India) Saina Nehwal
5. (China) Jiang Yanjiao
6. (Germany) Juliane Schenk
7. (Denmark) Tine Baun
8. (Chinese Taipei) Cheng Shao-chieh

=== Top half ===
First Round
1	(China) Wang YH	21	21
PFQ	(Canada) J Ko	9	6
(Japan) M Mitani	21	21
(Canada) N Grether	10	9
6	(Germany) J Schenk	17	21	16
(Japan) A Goto	21	13	21
Q3	(Hong Kong) Mong K Y	21	13	21
Q2	(Hong Kong) Tse Y S	13	21	16
3	(China) Wang X	21	21
(South Korea) Sung J-h	12	9
(Spain) C Marín	21	21
PFQ	(United States) R Wang	15	6
8	(Chinese Taipei) Cheng S-c	21	21
(Japan) S Sato	8	18
(Japan) E Hirose	21	18	21
(France) Pi HY	15	21	14

Second Round
1	(China) Wang YH	21	20	21
(Japan) M Mitani	18	22	16
(Japan) A Goto	21	21
Q3	(Hong Kong) Mong K Y	17	12
3	(China) Wang X	21	21
(Spain) C Marín	13	15
8	(Chinese Taipei) Cheng S-c	23	21
(Japan) E Hirose	21	14

Quarterfinals
1	(China) Wang YH	22	21
(Japan) A Goto	20	10
3	(China) Wang X	21	22
8	(Chinese Taipei) Cheng S-c	17	20

Semifinals
1	(China) Wang YH	12	18
3	(China) Wang X	21	21

=== Bottom half ===
First Round
(Canada) M Li	21	10	21
(Chinese Taipei) Pai H-m	7	21	12
Q1	(United States) I Wang	14	12
7	(Denmark) T Baun	21	21
(Netherlands) Yao J	21	24
(China) Liu X	16	22
(Hong Kong) Chan T K	4	17
4	(India) S Nehwal	21	21
(South Korea) Bae Y-j	11	21	21
(Japan) K Imabeppu	21	12	9
Q4	(Hong Kong) Cheung N Y	21	22
PFQ	(New Zealand) M Chan	13	20
(Bulgaria) P Nedelcheva	21	13	21
(Hong Kong) Yip P Y	19	21	14
PFQ	(Canada) C Reid	7	7
2	(China) Wang SX	21	21

Second Round
(Canada) M Li	12	14
7	(Denmark) T Baun	21	21
(Netherlands) Yao J	17	17
4	(India) S Nehwal	21	21
(South Korea) Bae Y-j	21	21
Q4	(Hong Kong) Cheung N Y	7	9
(Bulgaria) P Nedelcheva	16	10
2	(China) Wang SX	21	21

Quarterfinals
7	(Denmark) T Baun	21	21
4	(India) S Nehwal	16	15
(South Korea) Bae Y-j	10	18
2	(China) Wang SX	21	21

Semifinals
7	(Denmark) T Baun	21	19	21
2	(China) Wang SX	10	21	13

=== Finals ===
Semifinals
1	(China) Wang Yihan	12	18
3	(China) Wang Xin	21	21
7	(Denmark) Tine Baun	21	19	21
2	(China) Wang Shixian	10	21	13

Final
3	(China) Wang Xin	21	21
7	(Denmark) Tine Baun	17	14

== Men's doubles ==
=== Seeds ===
1. (China) Cai Yun / Fu Haifeng
2. (South Korea) Jung Jae-sung / Lee Yong-dae
3. (Denmark) Mathias Boe / Carsten Mogensen
4. (South Korea) Ko Sung-hyun / Yoo Yeon-seong
5. (Malaysia) Koo Kien Keat / Tan Boon Heong
6. (China) Chai Biao / Guo Zhendong
7. (Indonesia) Hendra Aprida Gunawan / Alvent Yulianto
8. (Japan) Hirokatsu Hashimoto / Noriyasu Hirata

=== Top half ===
First Round
1	(China) Cai Y (China) Fu HF	21	21
(South Korea) Kim K-j (South Korea) Shin B-c	13	16
(Japan) Y Hirobe (Japan) K Kazuno	15	8
(Chinese Taipei) Fang C-m (Chinese Taipei) Lee S-m	21	21
6	(China) Chai B (China) Guo ZD	14	13
(United States) H Bach (United States) T Gunawan	21	21
(Japan) N Kawamae (Japan) S Sato	21	21
(Canada) A Liu (Canada) D Ng	16	11
PFQ	(Chinese Taipei) Huang P-y (Chinese Taipei) Lu C-b	18	15
(Russia) V Durkin (Russia) A Nikolaenko	21	21
(China) Tao JM (China) Zhang N	w	/	o
(Malaysia) Gan T C (Malaysia) Tan B S
PFQ	(Denmark) C J Skovgård (Denmark) M Pieler Kolding	17	12
(Japan) H Endo (Japan) K Hayakawa	21	21
Q4	(Hong Kong) Chan D L (Hong Kong) Ho W L	8	14
Q2	(Hong Kong) Leung C Y (Hong Kong) Tam C H	21	21

Second Round
1	(China) Cai Y (China) Fu HF	21	21
(Chinese Taipei) Fang C-m (Chinese Taipei) Lee S-m	18	12
(United States) H Bach (United States) T Gunawan	19	21	21
(Japan) N Kawamae (Japan) S Sato	21	14	18
(Russia) V Durkin (Russia) A Nikolaenko	17	15
(China) Tao JM (China) Zhang N	21	21
(Japan) H End (Japan) K Hayakawa	21	21
Q2	(Hong Kong) Leung C Y (Hong Kong) Tam C H	15	15

Quarterfinals
1	(China) Cai Y (China) Fu HF	21	21
(United States) H Bach (United States) T Gunawan	13	16
(China) Tao JM (China) Zhang N	21	20	21
(Japan) H Endo (Japan) K Hayakawa	18	22	15

Semifinals
1	(China) Cai Y (China) Fu HF	w	/	o
(China) Tao JM (China) Zhang N

=== Bottom half ===
First Round
(Germany) I Kindervater (Germany) J Schöttler	21	21
Q1	(Hong Kong) Chan T K (Hong Kong) Lo L K	17	16
(Denmark) M Conrad-Petersen (Denmark) J Rasmussen	21	18	14
7	(Indonesia) H A Gunawan (Indonesia) A Yulianto	12	21	21
(Germany) M Fuchs (Germany) O Roth	21	23
Q3	(Hong Kong) Lee C H (Hong Kong) Ng K L	12	21
(Chinese Taipei) Chen H-l (Chinese Taipei) Lin Y-l	12	21	12
4	(South Korea) Ko S-h (South Korea) Yoo Y-s	21	19	21
PFQ	(Chinese Taipei) Liao M-c (Chinese Taipei) Wu C-w	19	20
(China) Liu XL (China) Qiu ZH	21	22
PFQ	(Chinese Taipei) Chen C-j (Chinese Taipei) Lin Y-j	19	10
8	(Japan) H Hashimoto (Japan) N Hirata	21	21
(India) R Kumar K.T. (India) S Thomas	21	21
(England) C Adcock (England) Andrew Ellis	16	17
(China) Hong W (China) Shen Y	22	15	10
2	(South Korea) Jung J-s (South Korea) Lee Y-d	20	21	21

Second Round
(Germany) I Kindervater (Germany) J Schöttler	13	14
7	(Indonesia) H A Gunawan (Indonesia) A Yulianto	21	21
(Germany) M Fuchs (Germany) O Roth	19	12
4	(South Korea) Ko S-h (South Korea) Yoo Y-s	21	21
(China) Liu XL (China) Qiu ZH	21	19	14
8	(Japan) H Hashimoto (Japan) N Hirata	13	21	21
(India) R Kumar K.T. (India) S Thomas	11	14
2	(South Korea) Jung J-s (South Korea) Lee Y-d	21	21

Quarterfinals
7	(Indonesia) H A Gunawan (Indonesia) A Yulianto	9	21	15
4	(South Korea) Ko S-h (South Korea) Yoo Y-s	21	18	21
8	(Japan) H Hashimoto (Japan) N Hirata	13	15
2	(South Korea) Jung J-s (South Korea) Lee Y-d	21	21

Semifinals
4	(South Korea) Ko S-h (South Korea) Yoo Y-s	10	9
2	(South Korea) Jung J-s (South Korea) Lee Y-d	21	21

=== Finals ===
Semifinals
1	(China) Cai Yun (China) Fu Haifeng	w	/	o
(China) Tao Jiaming (China) Zhang Nan
4	(South Korea) Ko Sung-hyun (South Korea) Yoo Yeon-seong	10	9
2	(South Korea) Jung Jae-sung (South Korea) Lee Yong-dae	21	21

Final
1	(China) Cai Yun (China) Fu Haifeng	14	24	21
2	(South Korea) Jung Jae-sung (South Korea) Lee Yong-dae	21	22	19

== Women's doubles ==
=== Seeds ===
1. (China) Wang Xiaoli / Yu Yang
2. (China) Tian Qing / Zhao Yunlei
3. (Japan) Mizuki Fujii / Reika Kakiiwa
4. (South Korea) Ha Jung-eun / Kim Min-jung
5. (Chinese Taipei) Cheng Wen-hsing / Chien Yu-chin
6. (Japan) Miyuki Maeda / Satoko Suetsuna
7. (Japan) Shizuka Matsuo / Mami Naito
8. (Denmark) Christinna Pedersen / Kamilla Rytter Juhl

=== Top half ===
First Round
1	(China) Wang XL (China) Yu Y	21	21
(Germany) S Marinello (Germany) B Michels	13	8
(Hong Kong) Shek H Y (Hong Kong) Wun Y H
(Malaysia) Chin E H (Malaysia) Wong P T	w	/	o
6	(Japan) M Maeda (Japan) S Suetsuna	21	21
(Canada) A Bruce (Canada) M Li	5	5
(Hong Kong) Poon L Y (Hong Kong) Tse Y S	21	21	21
(Canada) G Gao (Canada) J Ko	23	8	11
4	(South Korea) Ha J-e (South Korea) Kim M-j	w	/	o
(Thailand) S Ekmongkolpaisarn (Thailand) P Munkitchokecharoen
(Macau) A E De Assiss (Macau) Ieong P S	4	1
(United States) I Wang (United States) R Wang	21	21
5	(Chinese Taipei) Cheng W-h (Chinese Taipei) Chien Y-c	21	21
(Macau) Iao M H (Macau) Mak K L	4	5
(Denmark) L Damkjær Kruse (Denmark) M Rœpke
(Japan) M Matsutomo (Japan) A Takahashi	w	/	o

Second Round
1	(China) Wang XL (China) Yu Y	21	21
(Malaysia) Chin E H (Malaysia) Wong P T	8	16
6	(Japan) M Maeda (Japan) S Suetsuna	13	20
(Hong Kong) Poon L Y (Hong Kong) Tse Y S	21	22
4	(South Korea) Ha J-e (South Korea) Kim M-j	21	21
(United States) I Wang (United States) R Wang	12	7
5	(Chinese Taipei) Cheng W-h (Chinese Taipei) Chien Y-c	21	21
(Japan) M Matsutomo (Japan) A Takahashi	13	13

Quarterfinals
1	(China) Wang XL (China) Yu Y	21	21
(Hong Kong) Poon L Y (Hong Kong) Tse Y S	13	13
4	(South Korea) Ha J-e (South Korea) Kim M-j	15	21	25
5	(Chinese Taipei) Cheng W-h (Chinese Taipei) Chien Y-c	21	17	23

Semifinals
1	(China) Wang XL (China) Yu Y	21	21
4	(South Korea) Ha J-e (South Korea) Kim M-j	18	12

=== Bottom half ===
First Round
(England) J Wallwork (England) G White	21	21
(Hong Kong) Chan H Y (Hong Kong) Ng K S	19	18
(India) J Gutta (India) A Ponnappa	15	14
8	(Denmark) C Pedersen (Denmark) K Rytter Juhl	21	21
(Hong Kong) Tsang W C (Hong Kong) Wing Y N	6	14
(Russia) V Sorokina (Russia) N Vislova	21	21
(Hong Kong) Mong K Y (Hong Kong) Yeung Y K	11	10
3	(Japan) M Fujii (Japan) R Kakiiwa	21	21
(South Korea) Jung K-e (South Korea) Kim H-n	21	19	21
(Chinese Taipei) Hsieh P-c (Chinese Taipei) Wang P-r	16	21	19
(Canada) N Grether (Canada) C Reid	6	11
7	(Japan) S Matsuo (Japan) M Naito	21	21
(China) Cheng S (China) Pan P	21	21
(Hong Kong) Ying M C (Hong Kong) Yuen S Y	11	11
(Hong Kong) Chan T K (Hong Kong) Cheung N Y	9	11
2	(China) Tian Q (China) Zhao YL	21	21

Second Round
(England) J Wallwork (England) G White	13	8
8	(Denmark) C Pedersen (Denmark) K Rytter Juhl	21	21
(Russia) V Sorokina (Russia) N Vislova	21	21
3	(Japan) M Fujii (Japan) R Kakiiwa	18	19
(South Korea) Jung K-e (South Korea) Kim H-n	19	21	21
7	(Japan) S Matsuo (Japan) M Naito	21	17	11
(China) Cheng S (China) Pan P	13	11
2	(China) Tian Q (China) Zhao YL	21	21

Quarterfinals
8	(Denmark) C Pedersen (Denmark) K Rytter Juhl	21	21
(Russia) V Sorokina (Russia) N Vislova	9	12
(South Korea) Jung K-e (South Korea) Kim H-n	12	18
2	(China) Tian Q (China) Zhao YL	21	21

Semifinals
8	(Denmark) C Pedersen (Denmark) K Rytter Juhl	18	13
2	(China) Tian Q (China) Zhao YL	21	21

=== Finals ===
Semifinals
1	(China) Wang Xiaoli (China) Yu Yang	21	21
4	(South Korea) Ha Jung-eun (South Korea) Kim Min-jung	18	12
8	(Denmark) Christinna Pedersen (Denmark) Kamilla Rytter Juhl	18	13
2	(China) Tian Qing (China) Zhao Yunlei	21	21

Final
1	(China) Wang Xiaoli (China) Yu Yang	21	14
2	(China) Tian Qing (China) Zhao Yunlei	12	2^{r}

== Mixed doubles ==
=== Seeds ===
1. (China) Zhang Nan / Zhao Yunlei
2. (China) Xu Chen / Ma Jin
3. (Denmark) Joachim Fischer Nielsen / Christinna Pedersen
4. (Chinese Taipei) Chen Hung-ling / Cheng Wen-hsing
5. (Germany) Michael Fuchs / Birgit Michels
6. (England) Chris Adcock / (Scotland) Imogen Bankier
7. (Poland) Robert Mateusiak / Nadieżda Zięba
8. (Japan) Shintaro Ikeda / Reiko Shiota

=== Top half ===
First Round
1	(China) Zhang N (China) Zhao YL	21	21
(South Korea) Lee Y-d (South Korea) Ha J-e	14	9
(South Korea) Kim K-j (South Korea) Jung K-e	21	18	22
(Japan) K Hayakawa (Japan) M Matsutomo	18	21	20
6	(England) Chris Adcock (Scotland) Imogen Bankier	21	10
(China) He HB (China) Bao YX	23	21
Q2	(Japan) K Kazuno (Japan) A Takahashi	16	13
(Denmark) M Pieler Kolding (Denmark) J Houmann	21	21
4	(Chinese Taipei) Chen H-l (Chinese Taipei) Cheng W-h	14	21	21
Q1	(China) Tao JM (China) Xia H	21	19	16
(Japan) S Sato (Japan) S Matsuo	29	21	17
(England) N Robertson (England) J Wallwork	30	18	21
8	(Japan) S Ikeda (Japan) R Shiota	14	19
(China) Hong W (China) Pan P	21	21
Q3	(Japan) N Hirata (Japan) M Maeda	21	12	19
(Chinese Taipei) Lee S-m (Chinese Taipei) Chien Y-c	13	21	21

Second Round
1	(China) Zhang N (China) Zhao YL	21	21
(South Korea) Kim K-j (South Korea) Jung K-e	18	16
(China) He HB (China) Bao YX	24	21
(Denmark) M Pieler Kolding (Denmark) J Houmann	22	18
4	(Chinese Taipei) Chen H-l (Chinese Taipei) Cheng W-h	23	21
(England) N Robertson (England) J Wallwork	21	16
(China) Hong W (China) Pan P	21	21
(Chinese Taipei) Lee S-m (Chinese Taipei) Chien Y-c	18	17

Quarterfinals
1	(China) Zhang N (China) Zhao YL	21	21
(China) He HB (China) Bao YX	13	15
4	(Chinese Taipei) Chen H-l (Chinese Taipei) Cheng W-h	21	9	21
(China) Hong W (China) Pan P	13	21	13

Semifinals
1	(China) Zhang N (China) Zhao YL	21	21
4	(Chinese Taipei) Chen H-l (Chinese Taipei) Cheng W-h	15	12

=== Bottom half ===
First Round
(South Korea) Ko S-h (South Korea) Eom H-w	21	21
(Canada) A Liu (Canada) J Ko	16	16
(Malaysia) Chan P S (Malaysia) Goh L Y	21	21
7	(Poland) R Mateusiak (Poland) N Zięba	19	17
(Japan) H Hashimoto (Japan) M Fujii	16	19
Q4	(Chinese Taipei) Fang C-m (Chinese Taipei) Wang P-r	21	21
(Canada) T Ng (Canada) G Gao	11	12
3	(Denmark) J Fischer Nielsen (Denmark) C Pedersen	21	21
(Russia) A Nikolaenko (Russia) V Sorokina	21	13	21
(Denmark) T Laybourn (Denmark) K Rytter Juhl	19	21	19
(Russia) V Durkin (Russia) N Vislova	18	21	15
5	(Germany) M Fuchs (Germany) B Michels	21	15	21
(Hong Kong) Wong W H (Hong Kong) Chau C H	15	24
(India) Diju V. (India) J Gutta	21	26
(Scotland) R Blair (England) G White	11	18
2	(China) Xu C (China) Ma J	21	21

Second Round
(South Korea) Ko S-h (South Korea) Eom H-w	21	21
(Malaysia) Chan P S (Malaysia) Goh L Y	17	15
Q4	(Chinese Taipei) Fang C-m (Chinese Taipei) Wang P-r	13	6
3	(Denmark) J Fischer Nielsen (Denmark) C Pedersen	21	21
(Russia) A Nikolaenko (Russia) V Sorokina	21	25
5	(Germany) M Fuchs (Germany) B Michels	15	23
(India) Diju V. (India) J Gutta	18	16
2	(China) Xu C (China) Ma J	21	21

Quarterfinals
(South Korea) Ko S-h (South Korea) Eom H-w	17	10
3	(Denmark) J Fischer Nielsen (Denmark) C Pedersen	21	21
(Russia) A Nikolaenko (Russia) V Sorokina	10	14
2	(China) Xu C (China) Ma J	21	21

Semifinals
3	(Denmark) J Fischer Nielsen (Denmark) C Pedersen	21	21
2	(China) Xu C (China) Ma J	16	12

=== Finals ===
Semifinals
1	(China) Zhang Nan (China) Zhao Yunlei	21	21
4	(Chinese Taipei) Chen Hung-ling (Chinese Taipei) Cheng Wen-hsing	15	12
3	(Denmark) Joachim Fischer Nielsen (Denmark) Christinna Pedersen	21	21
2	(China) Xu Chen (China) Ma Jin	16	12

Final
1	(China) Zhang Nan (China) Zhao Yunlei	15	21	21
3	(Denmark) Joachim Fischer Nielsen (Denmark) Christinna Pedersen	21	17	17

Preceded by 2010 Hong Kong Super Series	Hong Kong Super Series	Succeeded by 2012 Hong Kong Super Series
Preceded by 2011 French Super Series	2011 BWF Super Series	Succeeded by 2011 China Open Super Series Premier
