= 2011 China Open Super Series Premier =

The 2011 China Open Super Series Premier was a top level badminton competition contested from November 22, 2011, to November 27, 2011, in Shanghai, China. It was the twelfth BWF Super Series competition on the 2011 BWF Super Series schedule. A total of $350,000 was given out as prize money.

== Men's singles ==
=== Seeds ===
1. (Malaysia) Lee Chong Wei (semi-finals)
2. (China) Chen Long (final)
3. (China) Lin Dan (champion)
4. (Denmark) Peter Gade (quarter-finals)
5. (China) Chen Jin (quarter-finals)
6. (Japan) Sho Sasaki (quarter-finals)
7. (Vietnam) Nguyen Tien Minh (second round)
8. (Indonesia) Taufik Hidayat (second round)

=== Finals ===
Semifinals
1	(Malaysia) Lee Chong Wei	21	12	11
3	(China) Lin Dan	19	21	21
(Indonesia) Simon Santoso	14	14
2	(China) Chen Long	21	21

Final
3	(China) Lin Dan	21	26
2	(China) Chen Long	17	24

=== Top half ===
First Round
1	(Malaysia) Lee C W	21	21
(Poland) P Wacha	11	8
(India) K Parupalli	17	16
(Japan) K Tago	21	21
6	(Japan) S Sasaki	21	21
(Guatemala) K Cordón	15	9
(Spain) P Abián	11	21	21
(Germany) M Zwiebler	21	15	8
3	(China) Lin D	21	21
Q1	(Hong Kong) Chan Y K	10	18
(India) A Jayaram	18	19
(Hong Kong) Wong W K	21	21
7	(Vietnam) Nguyen T M	21	21
(Indonesia) T Sugiarto	19	19
(Chinese Taipei) Hsueh H-y	19	17
(Denmark) J Ø Jørgensen	21	21

Second Round
1	(Malaysia) Lee C W	21	21
(Japan) K Tago	9	7
6	(Japan) S Sasaki	21	22
(Spain) P Abián	10	20
3	(China) Lin D	21	21
(Hong Kong) Wong W K	16	15
7	(Vietnam) Nguyen T M	21	15	16
(Denmark) J Ø Jørgensen	13	21	21

Quarterfinals
1	(Malaysia) Lee C W	21	21
6	(Japan) S Sasaki	18	13
3	(China) Lin D	21	21
(Denmark) J Ø Jørgensen	17	14

Semifinals
1	(Malaysia) Lee C W	21	12	11
3	(China) Lin D	19	21	21

=== Bottom half ===
First Round
(Indonesia) S Santoso	21	21
(France) B Leverdez	16	15
Q2	(China) Lü Y	17	21	20
8	(Indonesia) T Hidayat	21	18	22
Q4	(China) Qiao B	12	8
(China) Du PY	21	21
(South Korea) Shon W-h	13	22	20
4	(Denmark) P Gade	21	20	22
(Japan) K Yamada	14	21	17
(China) Wang ZM	21	14	21
(Indonesia) D H Rumbaka	15	14
5	(China) Chen J	21	21
(Thailand) T Saensomboonsuk	14	15
(Denmark) H-K Vittinghus	21	21
Q3	(China) Wen K	14	18
2	(China) Chen L	21	21

Second Round
(Indonesia) S Santoso	21	21
8	(Indonesia) T Hidayat	15	10
(China) Du PY	16	21	12
4	(Denmark) P Gade	21	9	21
(China) Wang ZM	13	19
5	(China) Chen J	21	21
(Denmark) H-K Vittinghus	20	16
2	(China) Chen L	22	21

Quarterfinals
(Indonesia) S Santoso	15	21	21
4	(Denmark) P Gade	21	15	16
5	(China) Chen J	13	17
2	(China) Chen L	21	21

Semifinals
(Indonesia) S Santoso	14	14
2	(China) Chen L	21	21

== Women's singles ==
=== Seeds ===
1. (China) Wang Shixian (second round)
2. (China) Wang Yihan (champion)
3. (China) Wang Xin (final)
4. (India) Saina Nehwal (first round)
5. (China) Jiang Yanjiao (first round)
6. (Germany) Juliane Schenk (first round)
7. (Denmark) Tine Baun (second round)
8. (Chinese Taipei) Cheng Shao-chieh (first round)

=== Finals ===
Semifinals
(China) Li Xuerui	21	18	21
3	(China) Wang Xin	15	21	23
(China) Liu Xin	13	21	16
2	(China) Wang Yihan	21	19	21

Final
3	(China) Wang Xin	12^{r}
2	(China) Wang Yihan	18

=== Top half ===
First Round
1	(China) Wang SX	21	21
PFQ	(Thailand) S Taerattanachai	7	14
(Japan) E Hirose	21	13	13
(Thailand) R Inthanon	19	21	21
6	(Germany) J Schenk	18	21	23
(Hong Kong) Yip P Y	21	19	25
(France) Pi HY	13	9
(China) Li XR	21	21
3	(China) Wang X	21	21
(Netherlands) Yao J	16	11
Q1	(New Zealand) M Chan Ky	16	15
(Thailand) P Buranaprasertsuk	21	21
7	(Denmark) T Baun	21	21
(Chinese Taipei) Pai H-m	14	10
(Singapore) Gu J	12	16
Q2	(China) Yao X	21	21

Second Round
1	(China) Wang SX	18	19
(Thailand) R Inthanon	21	21
(Hong Kong) Yip P Y	11	10
(China) Li XR	21	21
3	(China) Wang X	21	21
(Thailand) P Buranaprasertsuk	19	10
7	(Denmark) T Baun	14	21	11
Q2	(China) Yao X	21	14	21

Quarterfinals
(Thailand) R Inthanon	21	13	7
(China) Li XR	16	21	21
3	(China) Wang X	21	21
Q2	(China) Yao X	10	15

Semifinals
(China) Li XR	21	18	21
3	(China) Wang X	15	21	23

=== Bottom half ===
First Round
(Spain) C Marín	23	10	13
Q4	(China) Chen XJ	21	21	21
(China) Liu X	21	21
8	(Chinese Taipei) Cheng S-c	12	11
(Singapore) Fu MT	21	19	20
(Japan) S Sato	19	21	22
(South Korea) Bae Y-j	15	24	21
4	(India) S Nehwal	21	22	15
Q3	(China) Han Li	21	21
PFQ	(Canada) N Grether	7	12
(Bulgaria) P Nedelcheva	15	21	21
5	(China) Jiang YJ	21	19	15
(South Korea) Sung J-h	21	21
(Thailand) S Ponsana	14	11
(Japan) A Goto	20	15
2	(China) Wang YH	22	21

Second Round
Q4	(China) Chen XJ	19	21	15
(China) Liu X	21	15	21
(Japan) S Sato	8	10
(South Korea) Bae Y-j	21	21
Q3	(China) Han Li	19	22
(Bulgaria) P Nedelcheva	21	24
(South Korea) Sung J-h	20	19
2	(China) Wang YH	22	21

Quarterfinals
(China) Liu X	21	20	21
(South Korea) Bae Y-j	17	22	16
(Bulgaria) P Nedelcheva	11	21	9
2	(China) Wang YH	21	18	21

Semifinals
(China) Liu X	13	21	16
2	(China) Wang YH	21	19	21

== Men's doubles ==
=== Seeds ===
1. (China) Cai Yun / Fu Haifeng (quarter-finals)
2. (South Korea) Jung Jae-sung / Lee Yong-dae (semi-finals)
3. (Denmark) Mathias Boe / Carsten Mogensen (champions)
4. (South Korea) Ko Sung-hyun / Yoo Yeon-seong (final)
5. (Malaysia) Koo Kien Keat / Tan Boon Heong (quarter-finals)
6. (Indonesia) Mohammad Ahsan / Bona Septano (first round)
7. (China) Chai Biao / Guo Zhendong (quarter-finals)
8. (Indonesia) Markis Kido / Hendra Setiawan (quarter-finals)

=== Finals ===
Semifinals
(Japan) Naoki Kawamae (Japan) Shoji Sato	12	18
4	(South Korea) Ko Sung-hyun (South Korea) Yoo Yeon-seong	21	21
3	(Denmark) Mathias Boe (Denmark) Carsten Mogensen	19	23	22
2	(South Korea) Jung Jae-sung (South Korea) Lee Yong-dae	21	21	20

Final
4	(South Korea) Ko Sung-hyun (South Korea) Yoo Yeon-seong	17	13
3	(Denmark) Mathias Boe (Denmark) Carsten Mogensen	21	21

=== Top half ===
First Round
1	(China) Cai Y (China) Fu HF	21	21
Q4	(Russia) V Durkin (Russia) A Nikolaenko	11	15
(China) Hong W (China) Shen Y	21	26
(Japan) Y Hirobe (Japan) K Kazuno	23	28
6	(Indonesia) M Ahsan (Indonesia) B Septano	15	18
(Japan) N Kawamae (Japan) S Sato	21	21
(Poland) A Cwalina (Poland) M Logosz	21	21
(Japan) H Endo (Japan) K Hayakawa	15	18
4	(South Korea) Ko S-h (South Korea) Yoo Y-s	21	21
Q2	(South Korea) Kim K-j (South Korea) Shin B-c	10	17
(Chinese Taipei) Chen H-l (Chinese Taipei) Lin Y-l	21	19	21
(Germany) M Fuchs (Germany) O Roth	9	21	14
5	(Malaysia) Koo K K (Malaysia) Tan B H	21	21
(India) R Kumar (India) S Thomas	12	14
(Germany) I Kindervater (Germany) J Schöttler	12	21	21
(Indonesia) A Y Chandra (Indonesia) H A Gunawan	21	14	15

Second Round
1	(China) Cai Y (China) Fu HF	19	21	21
(Japan) Y Hirobe (Japan) K Kazuno	21	11	15
(Japan) N Kawamae (Japan) S Sato	21	21
(Poland) A Cwalina (Poland) M Logosz	14	19
4	(South Korea) Ko S-h (South Korea) Yoo Y-s	21	21
(Chinese Taipei) Chen H-l (Chinese Taipei) Lin Y-l	16	11
5	(Malaysia) Koo K K (Malaysia) Tan B H	21	21
(Germany) I Kindervater (Germany) J Schöttler	7	16

Quarterfinals
1	(China) Cai Y (China) Fu HF
(Japan) N Kawamae (Japan) S Sato	w	/	o
4	(South Korea) Ko S-h (South Korea) Yoo Y-s	18	21	21
5	(Malaysia) Koo K K (Malaysia) Tan B H	21	12	17

Semifinals
(Japan) N Kawamae (Japan) S Sato	12	18
4	(South Korea) Ko S-h (South Korea) Yoo Y-s	21	21

=== Bottom half ===
First Round
(China) Tao JM (China) Zhang N	20	14
(Indonesia) A Pratama (Indonesia) R A Saputro	22	21
(Malaysia) Gan T C (Malaysia) Tan B S	20	21	16
8	(Indonesia) M Kido (Indonesia) H Setiawan	22	14	21
(Japan) H Hashimoto (Japan) N Hirata	21	21
Q1	(Malaysia) M Z A Latif (Malaysia) M F M Tazari	13	10
(United States) H Bach (United States) T Gunawan	15	20
3	(Denmark) M Boe (Denmark) C Mogensen	21	22
(Denmark) M Conrad-Petersen (Denmark) J Rasmussen	21	21
PFQ	(Australia) R Smith (Australia) G Warfe	11	16
(Chinese Taipei) Fang C-m (Chinese Taipei) Lee S-m	18	10
7	(China) Chai B (China) Guo ZD	21	21
(Canada) A Liu (Canada) D Ng	9	13
(China) Liu XL (China) Qiu ZH	21	21
(England) C Adcock (England) A Ellis
2	(South Korea) Jung J-s (South Korea) Lee Y-d	w	/	o

Second Round
(Indonesia) A Pratama (Indonesia) R A Saputro	20	17
8	(Indonesia) M Kido (Indonesia) H Setiawan	22	21
(Japan) H Hashimoto (Japan) N Hirata	18	8
3	(Denmark) M Boe (Denmark) C Mogensen	21	21
(Denmark) M Conrad-Petersen (Denmark) J Rasmussen	10	11
7	(China) Chai B (China) Guo ZD	21	21
(China) Liu XL (China) Qiu ZH	22	22	17
2	(South Korea) Jung J-s (South Korea) Lee Y-d	24	20	21

Quarterfinals
8	(Indonesia) M Kido (Indonesia) H Setiawan	20	23	26
3	(Denmark) M Boe (Denmark) C Mogensen	22	21	28
7	(China) Chai B (China) Guo ZD	16	13
2	(South Korea) Jung J-s (South Korea) Lee Y-d	21	21

Semifinals
3	(Denmark) M Boe (Denmark) C Mogensen	19	23	22
2	(South Korea) Jung J-s (South Korea) Lee Y-d	21	21	20

== Women's doubles ==
=== Seeds ===
1. (China) Wang Xiaoli / Yu Yang (champions)
2. (China) Tian Qing / Zhao Yunlei (semi-finals)
3. (Japan) Mizuki Fujii / Reika Kakiiwa (semi-finals)
4. (South Korea) Ha Jung-eun / Kim Min-jung (second round)
5. (Chinese Taipei) Cheng Wen-hsing / Chien Yu-chin (first round)
6. (Japan) Miyuki Maeda / Satoko Suetsuna (second round)
7. (Japan) Shizuka Matsuo / Mami Naito (quarter-finals)
8. (Indonesia) Meiliana Jauhari / Greysia Polii (first round)

=== Finals ===
Semifinals
1	(China) Wang Xiaoli (China) Yu Yang	21	21
3	(Japan) Mizuki Fujii (Japan) Reika Kakiiwa	13	14
(China) Tang Jinhua (China) Xia Huan	w	/	o
2	(China) Tian Qing (China) Zhao Yunlei

Final
1	(China) Wang Xiaoli (China) Yu Yang	21	21
(China) Tang Jinhua (China) Xia Huan	11	10

=== Top half ===
First Round
(Thailand) D Aroonkesorn (Thailand) K Voravichitchaikul	21	15	18
(Hong Kong) Poon L Y (Hong Kong) Tse Y S	15	21	21
8	(Indonesia) M Jauhari (Indonesia) G Polii	15	8
(China) Cheng S (China) Pan P	21	21
(Germany) S Marinello (Germany) B Michels	18	17
(South Korea) Jung K-e (South Korea) Kim H-n	21	21
3	(Japan) M Fujii (Japan) R Kakiiwa	21	21
(Malaysia) Chin E H (Malaysia) Wong P T	14	19
(Singapore) S M Sari (Singapore) Yao L	11	16
(Russia) V Sorokina (Russia) N Vislova	21	21
5	(Chinese Taipei) Cheng W-h (Chinese Taipei) Chien Y-c	15^{r}
(United States) I Wang (United States) R Wang	21
(Australia) L Choo (Australia) R Veeran	15	16
(India) J Gutta (India) A Ponnappa	21	21

Second Round
1	(China) Wang XL (China) Yu Y	21	21
(Hong Kong) Poon L Y (Hong Kong) Tse Y S	14	17
(China) Cheng S (China) Pan P	21	21
(South Korea) Jung K-e (South Korea) Kim H-n	18	15
3	(Japan) M Fujii (Japan) R Kakiiwa	21	21
(Russia) V Sorokina (Russia) N Vislova	9	12
(United States) I Wang (United States) R Wang	9	12
(India) J Gutta (India) A Ponnappa	21	21

Quarterfinals
1	(China) Wang XL (China) Yu Y	21	21
(China) Cheng S (China) Pan P	11	9
3	(Japan) M Fujii (Japan) R Kakiiwa	22	21
(India) J Gutta (India) A Ponnappa	20	11

Semifinals
1	(China) Wang XL (China) Yu Y	21	21
3	(Japan) M Fujii (Japan) R Kakiiwa	13	14

=== Bottom half ===
First Round
(Japan) M Matsutomo (Japan) A Takahashi	21	21
(England) J Wallwork (England) G White	13	14
(Thailand) S Amitrapai (Thailand) S Nessara
6	(Japan) M Maeda (Japan) S Suetsuna	w	/	o
(Indonesia) A F Agustin (Indonesia) N K Maheswari	14	21	18
(China) Tang JH (China) Xia H	21	14	21
(Denmark) C Pedersen (Denmark) K Rytter Juhl	21	21
4	(South Korea) Ha J-e (South Korea) Kim M-j	23	23
(Canada) G Gao (Canada) J Ko	14	13
(China) Xie J (China) Bao YX	21	21
(Canada) N Grether (Canada) C Reid	10	9
7	(Japan) S Matsuo (Japan) M Naito	21	21
(Indonesia) V Marissa (Indonesia) N Melati	17	15
(Chinese Taipei) Hsieh P-c (Chinese Taipei) Wang P-r	21	21
(Denmark) L Damkjær Kruse (Denmark) M Rœpke
2	(China) Tian Q (China) Zhao YL	w	/	o

Second Round
(Japan) M Matsutomo (Japan) A Takahashi	21	19	21
6	(Japan) M Maeda (Japan) S Suetsuna	14	21	14
(China) Tang JH (China) Xia H	17	21	21
4	(South Korea) Ha J-e (South Korea) Kim M-j	21	17	10
(China) Xie J (China) Bao YX	18	13
7	(Japan) S Matsuo (Japan) M Naito	21	21
(Chinese Taipei) Hsieh P-c (Chinese Taipei) Wang P-r	15	14
2	(China) Tian Q (China) Zhao YL	21	21

Quarterfinals
(Japan) M Matsutomo (Japan) A Takahashi	19	12
(China) Tang JH (China) Xia H	21	21
7	(Japan) S Matsuo (Japan) M Naito	10	7
2	(China) Tian Q (China) Zhao YL	21	21

Semifinals
(China) Tang JH (China) Xia H	w	/	o
2	(China) Tian Q (China) Zhao YL

== Mixed doubles ==
=== Seeds ===
1. (China) Zhang Nan / Zhao Yunlei (champions)
2. (China) Xu Chen / Ma Jin (second round)
3. (Denmark) Joachim Fischer Nielsen / Christinna Pedersen (final)
4. (Indonesia) Tontowi Ahmad / Liliyana Natsir (second round)
5. (Chinese Taipei) Chen Hung-ling / Cheng Wen-hsing (quarter-finals)
6. (Thailand) Sudket Prapakamol / Saralee Thoungthongkam (first round)
7. (Thailand) Songphon Anugritayawon / Kunchala Voravichitchaikul (semi-finals)
8. (South Korea) Lee Yong-dae / Ha Jung-eun (first round)

=== Finals ===
Semifinals
1	(China) Zhang Nan (China) Zhao Yunlei	21	21
(China) Tao Jiaming (China) Xia Huan	18	19
3	(Denmark) Joachim Fischer Nielsen (Denmark) Christinna Pedersen	21	21
7	(Thailand) Songphon Anugritayawon (Thailand) Kunchala Voravichitchaikul	18	14

Final
1	(China) Zhang Nan (China) Zhao Yunlei	21	21
3	(Denmark) Joachim Fischer Nielsen (Denmark) Christinna Pedersen	11	14

=== Top half ===
First Round
1	(China) Zhang N (China) Zhao YL	w	/	o
Q2	(China) He HB (China) Bao YX
(Canada) T Ng (Canada) G Gao	13	19
(Japan) S Sato (Japan) S Matsuo	21	21
5	(Chinese Taipei) Chen H-l (Chinese Taipei) Cheng W-h	21	22
(Indonesia) N Widianto (Indonesia) V Marissa	19	20
Q1	(Japan) N Hirata (Japan) M Maeda	21	13	20
(Poland) R Mateusiak (Poland) N Zieba	18	21	22
4	(Indonesia) T Ahmad (Indonesia) L Natsir	21	21
(Japan) H Hashimoto (Japan) M Fujii	12	11
(Japan) S Ikeda (Japan) R Shiota	21	11	21
(Denmark) T Laybourn (Denmark) K Rytter Juhl	12	21	23
6	(Thailand) S Prapakamol (Thailand) S Thoungthongkam	16	11
Q3	(China) Tao JM (China) Xia H	21	21
(China) Hong W (China) Pan P	21	21
(Russia) A Nikolaenko (Russia) V Sorokina	13	16

Second Round
1	(China) Zhang N (China) Zhao YL	21	21
(Japan) S Sato (Japan) S Matsuo	17	15
5	(Chinese Taipei) Chen H-l (Chinese Taipei) Cheng W-h	21	10
(Poland) R Mateusiak (Poland) N Zieba	12	5^{r}
4	(Indonesia) T Ahmad (Indonesia) L Natsir	17	13
(Denmark) T Laybourn (Denmark) K Rytter Juhl	21	21
Q3	(China) Tao JM (China) Xia H	21	21
(China) Hong W (China) Pan P	11	11

Quarterfinals
1	(China) Zhang N (China) Zhao YL	21	17	21
5	(Chinese Taipei) Chen H-l (Chinese Taipei) Cheng W-h	13	21	17
(Denmark) T Laybourn (Denmark) K Rytter Juhl	16	20
(China) Tao JM (China) Xia H	21	22

Semifinals
1	(China) Zhang N (China) Zhao YL	21	21
(China) Tao JM (China) Xia H	18	19

=== Bottom half ===
First Round
(Thailand) M Jongjit (Thailand) S Amitrapai	22	21
(England) N Robertson (England) J Wallwork	20	13
(Denmark) M Pieler Kolding (Denmark) J Houmann	17	21	21
8	(South Korea) Lee Y-d (South Korea) Ha J-e	21	9	18
(India) Diju V. (India) J Gutta	21	21
(Indonesia) M Rijal (Indonesia) D Susanto	17	16
(Chinese Taipei) Lee S-m (Chinese Taipei) Chien Y-c	13	17
3	(Denmark) J Fischer Nielsen (Denmark) C Pedersen	21	21
(Germany) M Fuchs (Germany) B Michels	21	21
(Singapore) D B Chrisnanta (Singapore) Y Y V Neo	18	18
(Scotland) R Blair (England) G White	19	18
7	(Thailand) S Anugritayawon (Thailand) K Voravichitchaikul	21	21
(England) C Adcock (Scotland) I Bankier	17	16
(Malaysia) Chan P S (Malaysia) Goh L Y	21	21
Q4	(South Korea) Ko S-h (South Korea) Eom H-w	21	6	16
2	(China) Xu C (China) Ma J	15	21	21

Second Round
(Thailand) M Jongjit (Thailand) S Amitrapai	21	22
(Denmark) M Pieler Kolding (Denmark) J Houmann	12	20
(India) Diju V. (India) J Gutta	14	14
3	(Denmark) J Fischer Nielsen (Denmark) C Pedersen	21	21
(Germany) M Fuchs (Germany) B Michels	20	20
7	(Thailand) S Anugritayawon (Thailand) K Voravichitchaikul	22	22
(Malaysia) Chan P S (Malaysia) Goh L Y	21	11	21
2	(China) Xu C (China) Ma J	14	21	16

Quarterfinals
(Thailand) M Jongjit (Thailand) S Amitrapai	17	15
3	(Denmark) J Fischer Nielsen (Denmark) C Pedersen	21	21
7	(Thailand) S Anugritayawon (Thailand) K Voravichitchaikul	22	21
(Malaysia) Chan P S (Malaysia) Goh L Y	20	17

Semifinals
3	(Denmark) J Fischer Nielsen (Denmark) C Pedersen	21	21
7	(Thailand) S Anugritayawon (Thailand) K Voravichitchaikul	18	14

Preceded by 2010 China Open Super Series	China Open Super Series	Succeeded by 2012 China Open Super Series Premier
Preceded by 2011 Hong Kong Super Series	2011 BWF Super Series	Succeeded by 2011 BWF Super Series Masters Finals
