= Phillip Chew =

American badminton player (born 1994)

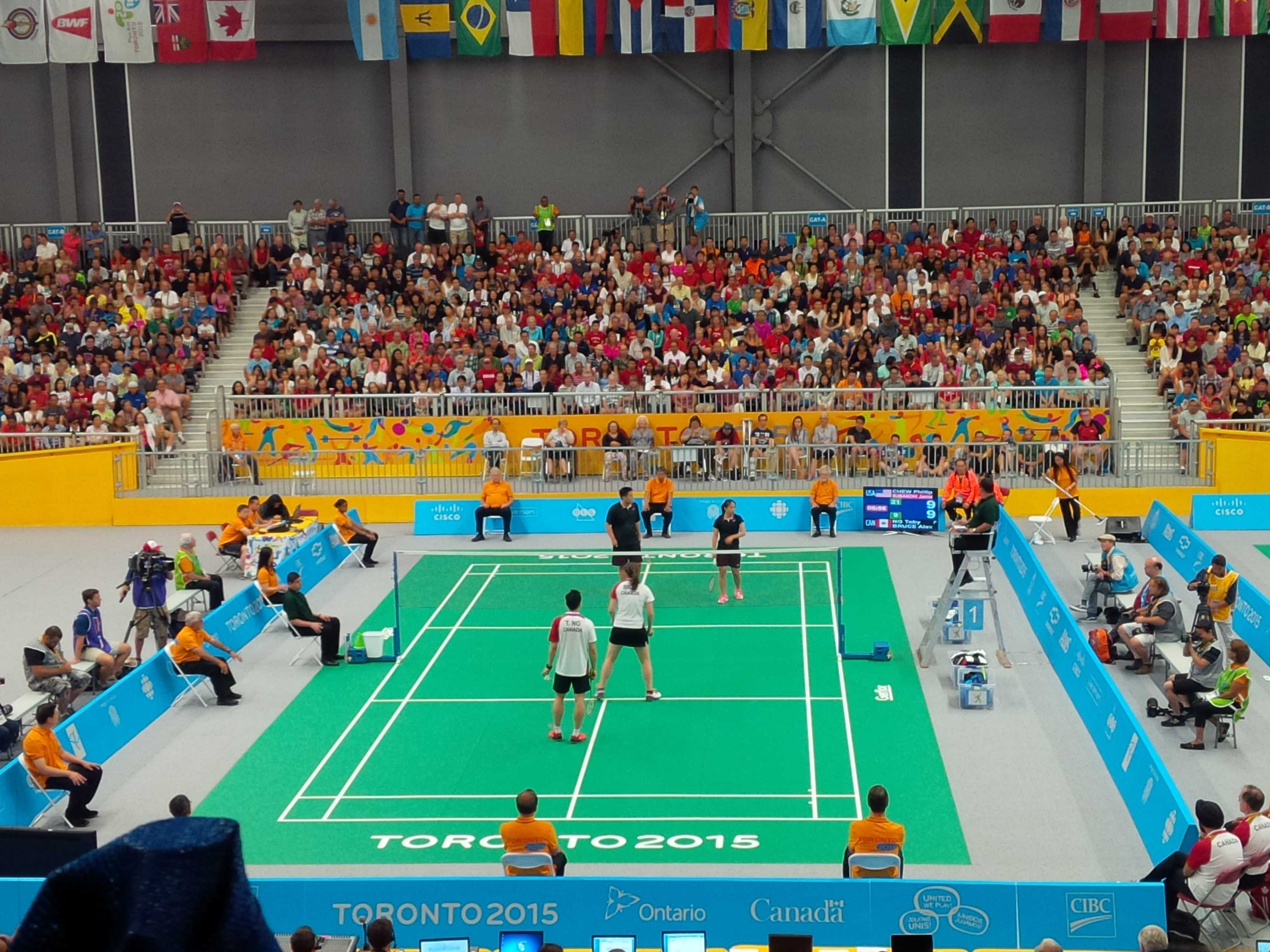

Personal information
- Born: Phillip Chew Hung; May 16, 1994 (age 32) Anaheim, California, U.S.
- Height: 5 ft 8 in (1.73 m)
- Weight: 201 lb (91 kg)

Sport
- Country: United States
- Sport: Badminton
- Handedness: Right

Men's & mixed doubles
- Highest ranking: 28 (MD with Sattawat Pongnairat March 26, 2015); 20 (XD with Jamie Subandhi August 31, 2015)
- Current ranking: 35 (MD with Ryan Chew), 108 (XD with Ariel Lee) (August 10, 2021)
- BWF profile
Medal record
Men's badminton
Representing United States
Pan American Games
Gold medal – first place	2015 Toronto	Men's doubles
Gold medal – first place	2015 Toronto	Mixed doubles
Silver medal – second place	2019 Lima	Men's doubles
Pan Am Championships
Gold medal – first place	2021 Guatemala City	Men's doubles
Silver medal – second place	2014 Markham	Men's doubles
Silver medal – second place	2014 Markham	Mixed doubles
Silver medal – second place	2018 Guatemala City	Men's doubles
Bronze medal – third place	2012 Lima	Mixed doubles
Pan Am Mixed Team Championships
Silver medal – second place	2012 Lima	Mixed team
Silver medal – second place	2013 Santo Domingo	Mixed team
Silver medal – second place	2014 Markham	Mixed team
Silver medal – second place	2019 Lima	Mixed team
Pan Am Men's Team Championships
Silver medal – second place	2018 Tacarigua	Men's team
Bronze medal – third place	2020 Salvador	Men's team

Phillip Hung Chew (born May 16, 1994) is an American badminton player. He won two gold medals in men's and mixed doubles at the 2015 Pan American Games. Chew also participated in the 2016 Rio and 2020 Tokyo Summer Olympics. He won the 2021 Pan Am Badminton Championships doubles with his brother Ryan Chew. He trains at the Orange County Badminton Club, which is founded by his grandfather, Don Chew.

== Career ==
In 2016, Chew represented the United States in both mixed and men's doubles events at the 2016 Summer Olympics.

Chew made his second appearance at the Olympic Games in 2020 Tokyo. He competing in the men's doubles event partnered with Ryan Chew, but he was eliminated in the group stage.

== Achievements ==
=== Pan American Games ===
Men's doubles
Year	Venue	Partner	Opponent	Score	Result
2015	Atos Markham Pan Am Centre; Toronto, Canada	(United States) Sattawat Pongnairat	(Brazil) Hugo Arthuso (Brazil) Daniel Paiola	21–18, 21–16	Gold
2019	Polideportivo 3 Lima, Peru	(United States) Ryan Chew	(Canada) Jason Ho-Shue (Canada) Nyl Yakura	11–21, 21–19, 18–21	Silver

Mixed doubles
Year	Venue	Partner	Opponent	Score	Result
2015	Atos Markham Pan Am Centre; Toronto, Canada	(United States) Jamie Subandhi	(Canada) Toby Ng (Canada) Alex Bruce	21–9, 21–23, 21–12	Gold

=== Pan Am Championships ===
Men's doubles
Year	Venue	Partner	Opponent	Score	Result
2014	Markham Pan Am Centre; Markham, Canada	(United States) Sattawat Pongnairat	(Canada) Adrian Liu (Canada) Derrick Ng	15–21, 13–21	Silver
2018	Teodoro Palacios Flores Gymnasium; Guatemala City, Guatemala	(United States) Ryan Chew	(Canada) Jason Ho-Shue (Canada) Nyl Yakura	17–21, 17–21	Silver
2021	Sagrado Corazon de Jesus; Guatemala City, Guatemala	(United States) Ryan Chew	(Canada) Jason Ho-Shue (Canada) Nyl Yakura	Walkover	Gold

Mixed doubles
Year	Venue	Partner	Opponent	Score	Result
2012	Manuel Bonilla Stadium, Miraflores; Lima, Peru	(United States) Jamie Subandhi	(Canada) Derrick Ng (Canada) Alex Bruce	21–14, 10–21, 18–21	Bronze
2014	Markham Pan Am Centre; Markham, Canada	(United States) Jamie Subandhi	(Canada) Toby Ng (Canada) Alex Bruce	16–21, 21–19, 18–21	Silver

=== BWF International Challenge/Series ===
Men's doubles
Year	Tournament	Partner	Opponent	Score	Result
2009	Santo Domingo Open	(United States) Halim Haryanto	(Guatemala) Kevin Cordón (Guatemala) Rodolfo Ramírez	23–21, 15–21, 17–21	(silver) Runner-up
2009	Puerto Rico International	(United States) Halim Haryanto	(Guatemala) Kevin Cordón (Guatemala) Rodolfo Ramírez	19–21, 21–13, 16–21	(silver) Runner-up
2010	Canadian International	(United States) Halim Haryanto	(Netherlands) Ruud Bosch (Netherlands) Koen Ridder	13–21, 10–21	(silver) Runner-up
2011	Miami International	(United States) Sattawat Pongnairat	(Brazil) Hugo Arthuso (Brazil) Daniel Paiola	16–21, 21–18, 9–21	(silver) Runner-up
2012	Brazil International	(United States) Sattawat Pongnairat	(Malaysia) Gan Teik Chai (Malaysia) Ong Soon Hock	14–21, 14–21	(silver) Runner-up
2013	Peru International	(United States) Sattawat Pongnairat	(Netherlands) Ruud Bosch (Netherlands) Koen Ridder	18–21, 11–21	(silver) Runner-up
2014	Sydney International	(United States) Sattawat Pongnairat	(China) Bao Zilong (China) Qi Shuangshuang	6–11, 7–11, 3–11	(silver) Runner-up
2015	Mercosul International	(United States) Sattawat Pongnairat	(Belgium) Matijs Dierickx (Belgium) Freek Golinski	13–21, 21–8, 19–21	(silver) Runner-up
2015	Chile International Challenge	(United States) Sattawat Pongnairat	(Canada) Adrian Liu (Canada) Derrick Ng	13–21, 22–20, 15–21	(silver) Runner-up
2016	Tahiti International	(United States) Sattawat Pongnairat	(Poland) Adam Cwalina (Poland) Przemysław Wacha	5–9 retired	(silver) Runner-up
2017	Carebaco International	(United States) Ryan Chew	(Jamaica) Gareth Henry (Jamaica) Samuel O'Brien Ricketts	21–12, 14–21, 12–21	(silver) Runner-up
2017	Guatemala International	(United States) Ryan Chew	(Guatemala) Rodolfo Ramírez (Guatemala) Jonathan Solís	21–10, 21–16	(gold) Winner
2018	Yonex / K&D Graphics International	(United States) Ryan Chew	(Chinese Taipei) Lu Chia-hung (Chinese Taipei) Lu Chia-pin	18–21, 10–21	(silver) Runner-up

Mixed doubles
Year	Tournament	Partner	Opponent	Score	Result
2010	Guatemala International	(United States) Cee Nantana Ketpura	(Canada) Toby Ng (Canada) Grace Gao	11–21, 12–21	(silver) Runner-up
2011	Miami International	(United States) Paula Lynn Obañana	(Sri Lanka) Lasitha Menaka Karunathilake (Sri Lanka) Chandrika de Silva	21–18, 17–21, 21–10	(gold) Winner
2012	Brazil International	(United States) Jamie Subandhi	(Brazil) Hugo Arthuso (Brazil) Fabiana Silva	21–19, 21–16	(gold) Winner
2013	Peru International	(United States) Jamie Subandhi	(Canada) Toby Ng (Canada) Grace Gao	12–21, 25–23, 17–21	(silver) Runner-up
2013	Brazil International	(United States) Jamie Subandhi	(Chinese Taipei) Yang Chih-hsun (Canada) Michelle Li	21–13, 21–19	(gold) Winner
2014	Guatemala International	(United States) Jamie Subandhi	(United States) Howard Shu (United States) Eva Lee	11–10, 5–11, 10–11, 11–8, 5–11	(silver) Runner-up
2014	USA International	(United States) Jamie Subandhi	(Canada) Toby Ng (Canada) Alex Bruce	21–18, 23–25, 9–21	(silver) Runner-up
2015	Mercosul International	(United States) Jamie Subandhi	(Canada) Kevin Li (Canada) Rachel Honderich	21–11, 21–17	(gold) Winner
2015	Sydney International	(United States) Jamie Subandhi	(Australia) Robin Middleton (Australia) Leanne Choo	8–21, 17–21	(silver) Runner-up
2015	Chile International Challenge	(United States) Jamie Subandhi	(Brazil) Alex Yuwan Tjong (Brazil) Luana Vicente	21–14, 21–14	(gold) Winner
2016	Tahiti International	(United States) Jamie Subandhi	(Russia) Vitalij Durkin (Russia) Nina Vislova	18–21, 21–16, 8–21	(silver) Runner-up

BWF International Challenge tournament
BWF International Series tournament

== Junior career ==
- 1999 U.S. Junior National Badminton Championships – Gold (U9 boys' doubles, U9 boys' singles)
- 2000 U.S. Junior National Badminton Championships – Gold (U9 boys' doubles, U9 boys' singles)
- 2001 U.S. Junior National Badminton Championships – Gold (U9 boys' singles)
- 2002 Pan American Junior Badminton Championships – Silver (U11 mixed doubles, U11 boys' doubles)
- 2002 U.S. Junior National Badminton Championships – Gold (U9 mixed doubles, U9 boys' doubles, U9 boys' singles)
- 2003 U.S. Junior National Badminton Championships – Gold (U11 mixed doubles, U11 boys' doubles, U11 boys' singles)
- 2004 U.S. Junior National Badminton Championships – Gold (U11 mixed doubles, boys' singles); Silver (boys' doubles)
- 2005 U.S. Junior National Badminton Championships – Gold (U13 mixed doubles, U13 boys' doubles, U13 boys' singles)
- 2006 U.S. Junior National Badminton Championships – Silver (U13 boys' doubles); Gold (U13 boys' singles)
- 2007 U.S. Junior National Badminton Championships – Gold (U15 mixed doubles, U15 boys' doubles, U15 boys' singles)
- 2008 Pan American Junior Badminton Championships – Gold (U15 mixed doubles, U15 boys' doubles, U15 boys' singles)
- 2008 U.S. Junior National Badminton Championships – Gold (U15 mixed doubles, U15 boys' doubles, U15 boys' singles)
- 2009 Pan American Junior Badminton Championships – Gold (U17 mixed doubles)
- 2009 U.S. Junior National Badminton Championships – Gold (U17 mixed doubles, boys' doubles)
- 2010 U.S. Junior National Badminton Championships – Gold (U17 mixed doubles, U17 boys' doubles, U17 boys' singles)
- 2011 U.S. Junior National Badminton Championships – Gold (U19 boys' doubles, U19 mixed doubles)
- 2012 Pan Am Juniors – Gold (boys' doubles, mixed doubles)
