= Paula Lynn Cao Hok =

Filipino-American badminton player

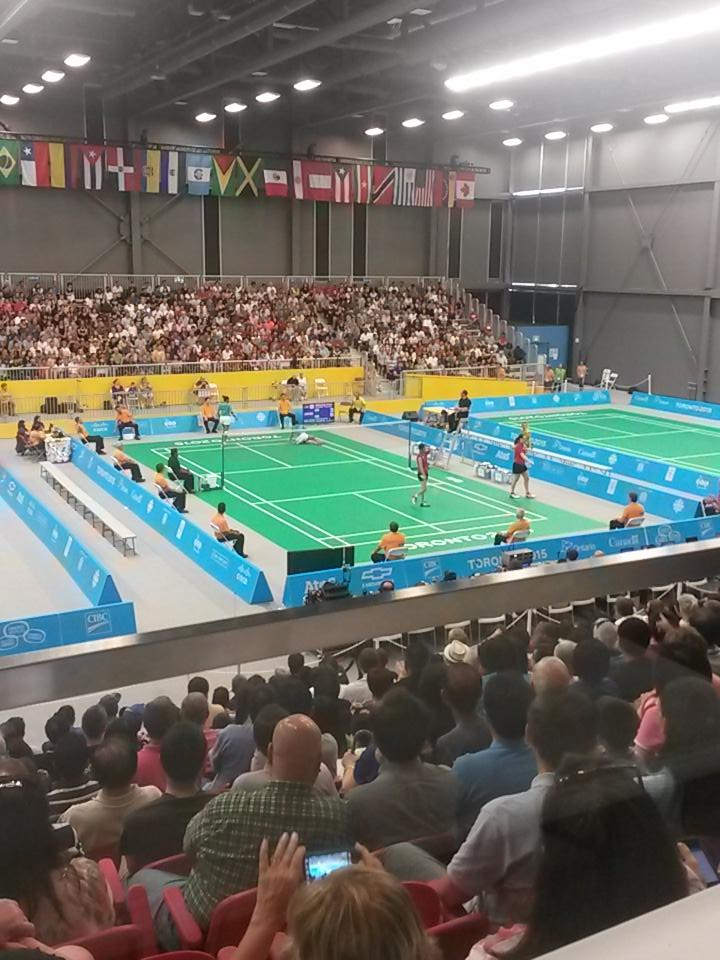

Personal information
- Born: Paula Lynn Parrocho Obañana; March 19, 1985 (age 41) Dumaguete, Philippines
- Height: 1.61 m (5 ft 3 in)
- Weight: 58 kg (128 lb)

Sport
- Country: United States
- Sport: Badminton
- Handedness: Right
- Coached by: Alistair Casey; Johanna Lee

Women's & mixed doubles
- Highest ranking: 17 (WD 2 April 2015); 63 (XD 30 July 2019)
- BWF profile
Medal record
Women's badminton
Representing United States
Pan American Games
Gold medal – first place	2015 Toronto	Women's doubles
Bronze medal – third place	2011 Guadalajara	Women's doubles
Bronze medal – third place	2011 Guadalajara	Mixed doubles
Bronze medal – third place	2019 Lima	Mixed doubles
Pan Am Championships
Gold medal – first place	2013 Santo Domingo	Women's doubles
Gold medal – first place	2014 Markham	Women's doubles
Silver medal – second place	2013 Santo Domingo	Mixed team
Silver medal – second place	2014 Markham	Mixed team

Paula Lynn Cao Hok (née Obañana; born March 19, 1985) is a Filipino-born badminton player who competes internationally for the United States. In 2015, she won the women's doubles gold medals at the Pan American Games in Toronto, Canada partnered with Eva Lee. In 2016, she competed at the Summer Olympics in Rio de Janeiro, Brazil.

== Personal life ==
Paula Lynn Obañana was born in Dumaguete, Philippines and started training at the age of 10 during her elementary years at the Silliman University Elementary School. She joined the high school badminton Varsity Team at Silliman University and was subsequently awarded "Athlete of the Year", "Most Outstanding Athlete of the Year", and "Most Valuable Player". After graduating from high school she was recruited on a scholarship to De La Salle University in Manila where she obtained her bachelor's degree.

Obañana left the Philippines in 2006 for the United States, where her mother Nenita had been recruited to work as a nurse in Minnesota. She became a U.S. citizen in May 2011.

== Achievements ==
=== Pan American Games ===
Women's doubles
Year	Venue	Partner	Opponent	Score	Result
2011	Multipurpose Gymnasium; Guadalajara, Mexico	(United States) Eva Lee	(Canada) Alex Bruce (Canada) Michelle Li	21–12, 16-21, 19-21	Bronze
2015	Atos Markham Pan Am Centre; Toronto, Canada	(United States) Eva Lee	(Brazil) Lohaynny Vicente (Brazil) Luana Vicente	21–14, 21–6	Gold

Mixed doubles
Year	Venue	Partner	Opponent	Score	Result
2011	Multipurpose Gymnasium; Guadalajara, Mexico	(United States) Howard Bach	(Canada) Toby Ng (Canada) Grace Gao	11–21, 21–19, 14–21	Bronze
2019	Polideportivo 3 Lima, Peru	(United States) Howard Shu	(Canada) Nyl Yakura (Canada) Kristen Tsai	15–21, 15–21	Bronze

=== Pan Am Championships ===
Women's doubles
Year	Venue	Partner	Opponent	Score	Result
2013	Palacio de los Deportes Virgilio Travieso Soto; Santo Domingo, Dominican Republic	(United States) Eva Lee	(Canada) Alex Bruce (Canada) Phyllis Chan	21–15, 21–13	Gold
2014	Markham Pan Am Centre; Markham, Canada	(United States) Eva Lee	(Brazil) Lohaynny Vicente (Brazil) Luana Vicente	23–21, 21–14	Gold

=== BWF Grand Prix (1 runner-up) ===
The BWF Grand Prix had two levels, the Grand Prix and Grand Prix Gold. It was a series of badminton tournaments sanctioned by the Badminton World Federation (BWF) and played between 2007 and 2017.

Women's doubles
Year	Tournament	Partner	Opponent	Score	Result
2014	U.S. Grand Prix	(United States) Eva Lee	(Chinese Taipei) Hsieh Pei-chen (Chinese Taipei) Wu Ti-jung	16–21, 10–21	(silver) Runner-up

BWF Grand Prix Gold tournament
BWF Grand Prix tournament

=== BWF International Challenge/Series (19 titles, 13 runners-up) ===
Women's doubles
Year	Tournament	Partner	Opponent	Score	Result
2009	Miami Pan Am International	(United States) Priscilla Lun	(Spain) Sandra Chirlaque (Peru) Alejandra Monteverde	22–20, 13–21, 21–13	(gold) Winner
2010	Brazil International	(United States) Eva Lee	(United States) Iris Wang (United States) Rena Wang	14–21, 21–11, 21–12	(gold) Winner
2011	Guatemala International	(United States) Eva Lee	(Canada) Grace Gao (Canada) Joycelyn Ko	19–21, 21–18, 21–13	(gold) Winner
2011	Brazil International	(United States) Eva Lee	(Canada) Alex Bruce (Canada) Michelle Li	21–14, 21–17	(gold) Winner
2011	Norwegian International	(United States) Eva Lee	(Netherlands) Lotte Jonathans (Netherlands) Paulien van Dooremalen	17–21, 21–6, 21–13	(gold) Winner
2012	Swedish Masters	(United States) Eva Lee	(England) Mariana Agathangelou (England) Heather Olver	15–21, 12–21	(silver) Runner-up
2012	Austrian International	(United States) Eva Lee	(Malaysia) Ng Hui Ern (Malaysia) Ng Hui Lin	16–21, 18–21	(silver) Runner-up
2012	Polish Open	(United States) Eva Lee	(England) Mariana Agathangelou (England) Heather Olver	12–21, 21–23	(silver) Runner-up
2012	Tahiti International	(United States) Eva Lee	(Canada) Alex Bruce (Canada) Michelle Li	21–13, 21–12	(gold) Winner
2013	Canadian International	(United States) Eva Lee	(Canada) Alex Bruce (Canada) Phyllis Chan	15–21, 14–21	(gold) Winner
2013	Bulgarian International	(United States) Eva Lee	(Bulgaria) Gabriela Stoeva (Bulgaria) Stefani Stoeva	15–21, 10–21	(silver) Runner-up
2014	Peru International	(United States) Eva Lee	(Canada) Nicole Grether (Canada) Charmaine Reid	21–14, 21–15	(gold) Winner
2014	Guatemala International	(United States) Eva Lee	(Brazil) Paula Pereira (Brazil) Fabiana Silva	11–3, 11–3, 11–10	(gold) Winner
2014	USA International	(United States) Eva Lee	(Japan) Naoko Fukuman (Japan) Kurumi Yonao	10–21, 23–25	(silver) Runner-up
2015	Guatemala International	(United States) Eva Lee	(Germany) Johanna Goliszewski (Germany) Carla Nelte	18–21, 22–24	(silver) Runner-up
2015	Bulgarian International	(United States) Eva Lee	(Bulgaria) Gabriela Stoeva (Bulgaria) Stefani Stoeva	14–21, 10–21	(silver) Runner-up
2015	Chile International Challenge	(United States) Eva Lee	(Brazil) Lohaynny Vicente (Brazil) Luana Vicente	21–17, 21–16	(gold) Winner
2016	Austrian Open	(United States) Eva Lee	(Russia) Ekaterina Bolotova (Russia) Evgeniya Kosetskaya	11–21, 21–23	(silver) Runner-up
2016	Tahiti International	(United States) Eva Lee	(Japan) Akane Araki (Japan) Ayaka Kawasaki	13–21, 12–21	(silver) Runner-up
2016	Yonex / K&D Graphics International	(United States) Eva Lee	(United States) Jing Yu Hong (United States) Beiwen Zhang	17–21, 20–22	(silver) Runner-up
2022	Peru Challenge	(United States) Lauren Lam	(United States) Annie Xu (United States) Kerry Xu	21–19, 21–18	(gold) Winner
2022	Mexican International	(United States) Lauren Lam	(Canada) Catherine Choi (Canada) Josephine Wu	19–21, 10–21	(silver) Runner-up
2022	El Salvador International	(United States) Lauren Lam	(United States) Annie Xu (United States) Kerry Xu	21–18, 21–17	(gold) Winner
2023	Estonian International	(United States) Lauren Lam	(Sweden) Moa Sjöö (Sweden) Tilda Sjöö	21–10, 21–11	(gold) Winner
2023	Lagos International	(United States) Lauren Lam	(India) Simran Singhi (India) Ritika Thaker	Walkover	(silver) Runner-up
2024	Uganda International	(United States) Lauren Lam	(United States) Francesca Corbett (United States) Allison Lee	19–21, 21–18, 21–15	(gold) Winner

Mixed doubles
Year	Tournament	Partner	Opponent	Score	Result
2011	Miami International	(United States) Phillip Chew	(Sri Lanka) Lasitha Menaka (Sri Lanka) Renu Chandrika Hettiarachchige	21–18, 17–21, 21–10	(gold) Winner
2019	Uganda International	(United States) Howard Shu	(United States) Vinson Chiu (United States) Breanna Chi	21–9, 21–12	(gold) Winner
2019	Mauritius International	(United States) Howard Shu	(United States) Vinson Chiu (United States) Breanna Chi	17–21, 16–21	(silver) Runner-up
2019	Peru International	(United States) Howard Shu	(Brazil) Fabricio Farias (Brazil) Jaqueline Lima	21–17, 22–20	(gold) Winner
2019	Benin International	(United States) Howard Shu	(Australia) Pit Seng Low (Australia) Louisa Ma	21–12, 21–13	(gold) Winner
2019	Côte d'Ivoire International	(United States) Howard Shu	(Egypt) Ahmed Salah (Egypt) Hadia Hosny	21–16, 21–14	(gold) Winner

BWF International Challenge tournament
BWF International Series tournament
BWF Future Series tournament
