= Alexandra Bruce =

Canadian badminton player (born 1990)

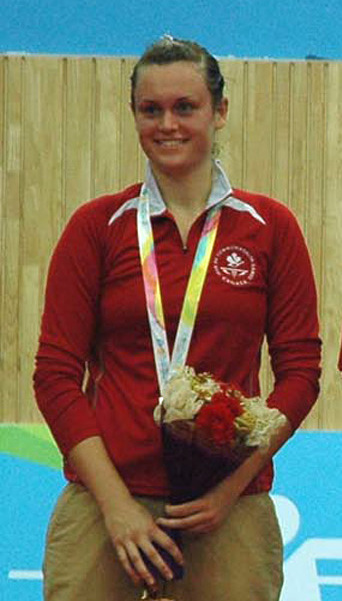
- Bruce at the 2008 Commonwealth Youth Games

Personal information
- Nicknames: Alex, Brucie
- Born: Mary Alexandra Bruce; May 27, 1990 (age 36) Toronto, Ontario, Canada
- Height: 1.82 m (6 ft 0 in)
- Weight: 75 kg (165 lb)

Sport
- Country: Canada
- Sport: Badminton
- Handedness: Right

Women's singles & doubles
- Highest ranking: 149 (WS April 15, 2010); 20 (WD September 20, 2012); 23 (XD October 29, 2015)
- BWF profile
Medal record
Women's badminton
Representing Canada
Pan American Games
Gold medal – first place	2011 Guadalajara	Women's doubles
Silver medal – second place	2015 Toronto	Mixed doubles
Bronze medal – third place	2015 Toronto	Women's doubles
Pan Am Championships
Gold medal – first place	2016 Campinas	Mixed team
Gold medal – first place	2014 Markham	Mixed doubles
Gold medal – first place	2014 Markham	Mixed team
Gold medal – first place	2013 Santo Domingo	Mixed doubles
Gold medal – first place	2013 Santo Domingo	Mixed team
Gold medal – first place	2012 Lima	Women's doubles
Gold medal – first place	2012 Lima	Mixed doubles
Gold medal – first place	2012 Lima	Mixed team
Gold medal – first place	2010 Curitiba	Mixed team
Gold medal – first place	2009 Guadalajara	Mixed team
Silver medal – second place	2013 Santo Domingo	Women's doubles
Silver medal – second place	[2010 Curitiba	Women's doubles
Silver medal – second place	2010 Curitiba	Mixed doubles
Bronze medal – third place	2014 Markham	Women's doubles
Bronze medal – third place	2009 Guadalajara	Mixed doubles
Commonwealth Youth Games
Silver medal – second place	2008 Pune	Girls' doubles

Mary Alexandra "Alex" Bruce (born May 27, 1990) is a Canadian badminton player from Toronto, Ontario. She competed at the 2012 Summer Olympics in the Women's doubles event with partner Michelle Li.

== Early career ==
She started playing badminton at aged 8. Her parents were members of a badminton club that put on clinics for kids. She won silver in doubles at the 2008 Commonwealth Youth Games. Bruce studied Engineering and played Varsity Badminton for the University of Western Ontario, where she was named OUA Female Rookie of the Year in 2008. At the 2009 Canadian university and college national championships, she won two gold medals in doubles play, and a silver medal in women's singles. At the 2010 Yonex National Championships, she and Martin Giuffre won the U23 Mixed Doubles title. Bruce also won bronze in Ladies' Singles, and silver in Ladies' Doubles with future Olympic partner Michelle Li.

== Personal life ==
Her parents are David and Cindy Bruce. Her older brother, Max played football at Queens University and the University of Manitoba. She graduated from Western University in 2014 with a Bachelor of Engineering Science (Civil Structural Engineering).

== 2012 Olympics ==
At the 2012 Summer Olympics, Bruce and Li finished last in the round-robin portion, losing all three of their matches. However, the top two teams in the group were disqualified for attempting to intentionally lose matches so they would have an easier match-up in the quarterfinals. The duo was advanced to their quarterfinals, where they defeated Australia's Leanne Choo and Renuga Veeran. Bruce and Li finished in fourth place, the best Canadian finish in badminton at the Olympic Games.

She competed at the 2014 Commonwealth Games, in the mixed teams, mixed doubles (with Toby Ng) and women's doubles (with Phyllis Chan).

== Achievements ==
=== Pan American Games ===
Women's doubles
Year	Venue	Partner	Opponent	Score	Result
2011	Multipurpose Gymnasium; Guadalajara, Mexico	(Canada) Michelle Li	(United States) Iris Wang (United States) Rena Wang	21–15, 21–15	Gold
2015	Atos Markham Pan Am Centre; Toronto, Ontario, Canada	(Canada) Phyllis Chan	(Brazil) Lohaynny Vicente (Brazil) Luana Vicente	20–22, 14–21	Bronze

Mixed doubles
Year	Venue	Partner	Opponent	Score	Result
2015	Atos Markham Pan Am Centre; Toronto, Ontario, Canada	(Canada) Toby Ng	(United States) Phillip Chew (United States) Jamie Subandhi	9–21, 23–21, 12–21	Silver

=== Pan Am Championships ===
Women's doubles
Year	Venue	Partner	Opponent	Score	Result
2010	Clube Curitibano; Curitiba, Brazil	(Canada) Michelle Li	(Canada) Grace Gao (Canada) Joycelyn Ko	21–16, 21–23, 12–21	Silver
2012	Manuel Bonilla Stadium, Miraflores; Lima, Peru	(Canada) Phyllis Chan	(Canada) Joycelyn Ko (Canada) Christin Tsai	17–21, 21–17, 21–12	Gold
2013	Palacio de los Deportes Virgilio Travieso Soto; Santo Domingo, Dominican Republic	(Canada) Phyllis Chan	(United States) Eva Lee (United States) Paula Lynn Obañana	15–21, 13–21	Silver
2014	Markham Pan Am Centre; Markham, Canada	(Canada) Phyllis Chan	(United States) Eva Lee (United States) Paula Lynn Obañana	9–21, 11–21	Bronze

Mixed doubles
Year	Venue	Partner	Opponent	Score	Result
2009	Coliseo Olímpico de la Universidad; Guadalajara, Mexico	(Canada) Kevin Li	(Canada) Alexander Pang (Canada) Joycelyn Ko	18–21, 21–19, 18–21	Bronze
2010	Clube Curitibano; Curitiba, Brazil	(Canada) Kevin Li	(Canada) Toby Ng (Canada) Grace Gao	7–21, 9–21	Silver
2012	Manuel Bonilla Stadium, Miraflores; Lima, Peru	(Canada) Derrick Ng	(Canada) Phillipe Charron (Canada) Phyllis Chan	21–5, 21–6	Gold
2013	Palacio de los Deportes Virgilio Travieso Soto; Santo Domingo, Dominican Republic	(Canada) Toby Ng	(United States) Howard Shu (United States) Eva Lee	21–12, 23–21	Gold
2014	Markham Pan Am Centre; Markham, Canada	(Canada) Toby Ng	(United States) Phillip Chew (United States) Jamie Subandhi	21–16, 19–21, 21–18	Gold

=== Commonwealth Youth Games ===
Girls' doubles
Year	Venue	Partner	Opponent	Score	Result
2008	Shree Shiv Chhatrapati Sports Complex, Pune, India	(Canada) Michelle Li	(India) P. C. Thulasi (India) N. Sikki Reddy	18–21, 8–21	Silver

=== BWF International Challenge/Series ===
Women's doubles
Year	Tournament	Partner	Opponent	Score	Result
2011	Banuinvest International	(Canada) Michelle Li	(Romania) Sonia Olariu (Romania) Florentina Petre	21–15, 21–14	(gold) Winner
2011	Brazil International	(Canada) Michelle Li	(United States) Iris Wang (United States) Rena Wang	11–21, 21–15, 21–8	(gold) Winner
2011	Brazil International	(Canada) Michelle Li	(United States) Eva Lee (United States) Paula Lynn Obañana	14–21, 17–21	(silver) Runner-up
2011	Puerto Rico International	(Canada) Michelle Li	(Canada) Grace Gao (Canada) Joycelyn Ko	24–22, 15–21, 21–11	(gold) Winner
2011	Canadian International	(Canada) Michelle Li	(Canada) Nicole Grether (Canada) Charmaine Reid	21–10, 13–21, 21–16	(gold) Winner
2012	Finnish Open	(Canada) Michelle Li	(Malaysia) Chow Mei Kuan (Malaysia) Lee Meng Yean	21–19, 12–21, 21–16	(gold) Winner
2012	Peru International	(Canada) Michelle Li	(Canada) Nicole Grether (Canada) Charmaine Reid	21–18, 21–18	(gold) Winner
2012	Tahiti International	(Canada) Michelle Li	(United States) Eva Lee (United States) Paula Lynn Obañana	13–21, 12–21	(silver) Runner-up
2013	Canadian International	(Canada) Phyllis Chan	(United States) Eva Lee (United States) Paula Lynn Obañana	15–21, 14–21	(silver) Runner-up
2014	Brazil International	(Canada) Phyllis Chan	(Canada) Nicole Grether (Canada) Charmaine Reid	11–10, 10–11, 11–8, 11–5	(gold) Winner
2015	Polish Open	(Canada) Phyllis Chan	(India) Pradnya Gadre (India) N. Sikki Reddy	16–21, 18–21	(silver) Runner-up

Mixed doubles
Year	Tournament	Partner	Opponent	Score	Result
2011	Guatemala International	(Canada) Derrick Ng	(Canada) Toby Ng (Canada) Grace Gao	20–22, 14–21	(silver) Runner-up
2011	Canadian International	(Canada) Derrick Ng	(Canada) Toby Ng (Canada) Grace Gao	15–21, 19–21	(silver) Runner-up
2012	Peru International	(Canada) Derrick Ng	(Canada) Toby Ng (Canada) Grace Gao	10–21, 15–21	(silver) Runner-up
2012	Tahiti International	(Canada) Derrick Ng	(Australia) Ross Smith (Australia) Renuga Veeran	21–23, 14–21	(silver) Runner-up
2013	Canadian International	(Canada) Toby Ng	(England) Nathan Robertson (England) Jenny Wallwork	9–21, 12–21	(silver) Runner-up
2014	USA International	(Canada) Toby Ng	(United States) Phillip Chew (United States) Jamie Subandhi	18–21, 25–23, 21–9	(gold) Winner
2016	Brazil International	(Canada) Toby Ng	(Austria) David Obernosterer (Austria) Elisabeth Baldauf	21–12, 21–15	(gold) Winner

BWF International Challenge tournament
BWF International Series tournament
