= 2010 Pan Am Badminton Championships =

Badminton competition in Curitiba, Brazil

The XVI 2010 Pan Am Badminton Championships were held in Curitiba, Brazil, between October 21 and October 24, 2010.

This event was part of the 2010 BWF Grand Prix Gold and Grand Prix series of the Badminton World Federation.

== Venue ==
- Clube Curitibano

== Medalists ==
Event	Gold	Silver	Bronze
Men's singles	(Canada) Stephan Wojcikiewicz	(Peru) Rodrigo Pacheco	(United States) Sattawat Pongnairat
Men's singles	(Canada) Stephan Wojcikiewicz	(Peru) Rodrigo Pacheco	(United States) Nicholas Jinadasa
Women's singles	(United States) Cee Nantana Ketpura	(Canada) Michelle Li	(Canada) Phyllis Chan
Women's singles	(United States) Cee Nantana Ketpura	(Canada) Michelle Li	(United States) Rena Wang
Men's doubles	(United States) Sameera Gunatileka and Vincent Nguy	(Brazil) Hugo Arthuso and Daniel Paiola	(Canada) Adrian Liu and Derrick Ng
Men's doubles	(United States) Sameera Gunatileka and Vincent Nguy	(Brazil) Hugo Arthuso and Daniel Paiola	(Peru) Bruno Monteverde and Rodrigo Pacheco
Women's doubles	(Canada) Grace Gao and Joycelyn Ko	(Canada) Alexandra Bruce and Michelle Li	(United States) Iris Wang and Rena Wang
Women's doubles	(Canada) Grace Gao and Joycelyn Ko	(Canada) Alexandra Bruce and Michelle Li	(Peru) Cristina Aicardi and Claudia Rivero
Mixed doubles	(Canada) Toby Ng and Grace Gao	(Canada) Kevin Li and Alexandra Bruce	(Canada) Adrian Liu and Joycelyn Ko
Mixed doubles	(Canada) Toby Ng and Grace Gao	(Canada) Kevin Li and Alexandra Bruce	(United States) Sattawat Pongnairat and Cee Nantana Ketpura
Teams	Canada	United States	Peru
