= Iris Wang =

American badminton player

Personal information
- Born: September 2, 1994 (age 32) Pasadena, California, U.S.
- Height: 5 ft 3 in (1.60 m)

Sport
- Country: United States
- Sport: Badminton
- Handedness: Right

Women's singles & doubles
- Highest ranking: 19 (WS January 3, 2023); 24 (XD April 21, 2011)
- Current ranking: 44 (WS January 2, 2024)
- BWF profile
Medal record
Women's badminton
Representing the United States
Pan American Games
Silver medal – second place	2011 Guadalajara	Women's doubles
Bronze medal – third place	2015 Toronto	Women's singles
Bronze medal – third place	2019 Lima	Women's singles
Pan American Championships
Bronze medal – third place	2009 Guadalajara	Women's doubles
Bronze medal – third place	2010 Curitiba	Women's doubles
Bronze medal – third place	2021 Guatemala City	Women's singles
Bronze medal – third place	2022 San Salvador	Women's singles
Bronze medal – third place	2023 Kingston	Women's singles
Pan American Mixed Team Championships
Silver medal – second place	2010 Curitiba	Mixed team
Silver medal – second place	2013 Santo Domingo	Mixed team
Silver medal – second place	2014 Markham	Mixed team

Iris Wang (born September 2, 1994) is an American badminton player who competed at the 2016 Summer Olympics in Rio de Janeiro, Brazil.

== Personal life ==
Wang was born in Pasadena, California, on September 2, 1994, to Chinese parents. Her older sister, Rena Wang, is also an international badminton player.

== Career ==
Wang won a bronze medal in the women's doubles at the 2010 Pan Am Badminton Championships playing alongside her sister Rena. In 2011, she was eliminated at the quarterfinal stage of the women's singles at the 2011 Pan American Games in Guadalajara, Jalisco, Mexico, after losing to Canadian player Michelle Li. Competing alongside her sister Rena, Wang won a silver medal in the women's doubles.

At the 2013 Pan Am Badminton Championships she won a silver medal in the team event as part of the United States squad. Wang won the gold medal at the 2014 Brazil International tournament, defeating Lohaynny Vicente in the final. She also won gold medals at the Mercosul International and Argentina International events. She was part of the United States squad that won a team silver medal at the 2014 Pan Am Badminton Championships.

At the 2015 Pan American Games held in Toronto, Ontario, Canada, Wang won a bronze medal in the women's singles. She defeated Damaris Ortiz Prada of Venezuela, Luana Vicente of Brazil and Daniela Macias of Peru, before losing her semifinal to Rachel Honderich of Canada.

In February 2016, Wang was part of the United States squad that won the women's team gold medal at the Pan American Team Continental Championships. Wang defeated Canada's Kyleigh O'Donoghue 21–12, 21–4, as the US won the final 3–2.

As of May 2016, Wang was ranked 33rd in the world for women's singles. The 34 highest ranked athletes, with a maximum of two per nation, earned qualification for the women's singles event in at the 2016 Summer Olympics in Rio de Janeiro, Brazil. The United States Olympic Committee confirmed Wang's place in the United States team on May 10, 2016.

== Achievements ==
=== Pan American Games ===
Women's singles
Year	Venue	Opponent	Score	Result
2015	Atos Markham Pan Am Centre, Toronto, Canada	(Canada) Rachel Honderich	15–21, 11–21	Bronze
2019	Polideportivo 3, Lima, Peru	(Canada) Michelle Li	10–21, 5–21	Bronze

Women's doubles
Year	Venue	Partner	Opponent	Score	Result
2011	Multipurpose Gymnasium; Guadalajara, Mexico	(United States) Rena Wang	(Canada) Alex Bruce (Canada) Michelle Li	15–21, 15–21	Silver

=== Pan American Championships ===
Women's singles
Year	Venue	Opponent	Score	Result
2021	Sagrado Corazon de Jesus, Guatemala City, Guatemala	(Canada) Rachel Chan	21–19, 19–21, 9–21	Bronze
2022	Palacio de los Deportes Carlos "El Famoso" Hernández, San Salvador, El Salvador	(Canada) Michelle Li	14–21, 18–21	Bronze
2023	G.C. Foster College of Physical Education and Sport, Kingston, Jamaica	(United States) Beiwen Zhang	11–21, 12–21	Bronze

Women's doubles
Year	Venue	Partner	Opponent	Score	Result
2009	Coliseo Olímpico de la Universidad de Guadalajara; Guadalajara, Mexico	(United States) Rena Wang	(Canada) Grace Gao (Canada) Fiona McKee	17–21, 21–18, 18–21	Bronze
2010	Clube Curitibano; Curitiba, Brazil	(United States) Rena Wang	(Canada) Grace Gao (Canada) Joycelyn Ko	16–21, 21–19, 18–21	Bronze

=== BWF World Tour (1 runner-up) ===
The BWF World Tour, which was announced on March 19, 2017, and implemented in 2018, is a series of elite badminton tournaments sanctioned by the Badminton World Federation (BWF). The BWF World Tour is divided into levels of World Tour Finals, Super 1000, Super 750, Super 500, Super 300 (part of the HSBC World Tour), and the BWF Tour Super 100.

Women's singles
Year	Tournament	Level	Opponent	Score	Result
2022	Orléans Masters	Super 100	(Indonesia) Putri Kusuma Wardani	21–7, 19–21, 18–21	(silver) Runner-up

=== BWF International Challenge/Series (6 titles, 5 runners-up) ===
Women's singles
Year	Tournament	Opponent	Score	Result
2013	Santo Domingo Open	(Brazil) Lohaynny Vicente	21–18, 21–6	(gold) Winner
2013	USA International	(United States) Beiwen Zhang	10–21, 12–21	(silver) Runner-up
2014	Mercosul International	(United States) Bo Rong	18–21, 21–17, 21–15	(gold) Winner
2014	Argentina International	(United States) Bo Rong	21–12, 21–15	(gold) Winner
2014	Brazil International	(Brazil) Lohaynny Vicente	11–5, 11–9, 11–7	(gold) Winner
2015	Spanish International	(Spain) Beatriz Corrales	13–21, 21–14, 21–15	(gold) Winner
2015	Bangladesh International	(India) Gadde Ruthvika Shivani	21–23, 21–19, 18–21	(silver) Runner-up
2016	Peru International	(Germany) Karin Schnaase	6–21, 17–21	(silver) Runner-up
2019	Maldives International	(Vietnam) Vũ Thị Trang	21–15, 21–14	(gold) Winner

Women's doubles
Year	Tournament	Partner	Opponent	Score	Result
2010	Brazil International	(United States) Rena Wang	(United States) Eva Lee (United States) Paula Lynn Obañana	21–14, 11–21, 12–21	(silver) Runner-up
2011	Peru International	(United States) Rena Wang	(Canada) Alex Bruce (Canada) Michelle Li	21–11, 15–21, 8–21	(silver) Runner-up

BWF International Challenge tournament
BWF International Series tournament
BWF Future Series tournament
