= Jamie Subandhi =

American badminton player

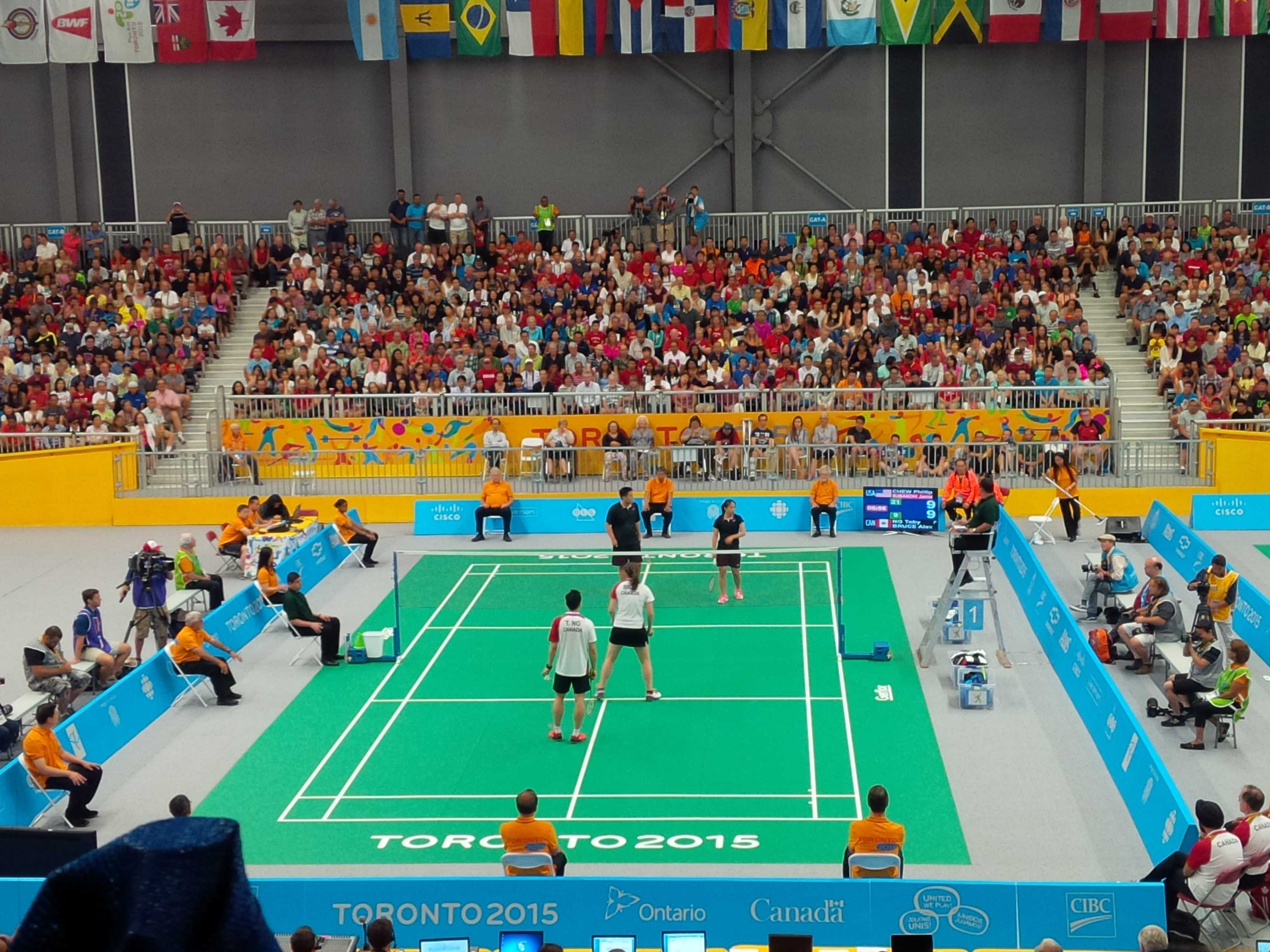

Personal information
- Full name: Jamie Chen Subandhi
- Born: December 15, 1989 (age 36) Long Beach, California, U.S.
- Height: 1.63 m (5 ft 4 in)
- Weight: 58 kg (128 lb)

Sport
- Country: United States
- Sport: Badminton
- Handedness: Right
- Coached by: Ignatius Rusli; Zi Min Cai; Rudy Gunawan

Women's singles & doubles
- Highest ranking: 38 (WS 26 Sep 2013); 212 (WD 27 Sep 2012); 20 (XD 13 Aug 2015)
- BWF profile
Medal record
Women's badminton
Representing United States
Pan American Games
| Gold medal – first place | 2015 Toronto | Mixed doubles |
| Bronze medal – third place | 2015 Toronto | Women's singles |
| Bronze medal – third place | 2007 Rio de Janeiro | Women's doubles |
Pan Am Badminton Championships
| Silver medal – second place | 2014 Markham | Mixed doubles |
| Silver medal – second place | 2014 Markham | Mixed team |
| Silver medal – second place | 2013 Santo Domingo | Women's singles |
| Silver medal – second place | 2013 Santo Domingo | Mixed team |
| Silver medal – second place | 2012 Lima | Women's singles |
| Silver medal – second place | 2012 Lima | Mixed team |
| Bronze medal – third place | 2017 Havana | Women's singles |
| Bronze medal – third place | 2014 Markham | Women's singles |
| Bronze medal – third place | 2012 Lima | Mixed doubles |
Pan Am Women's Team Championships
| Silver medal – second place | 2018 Tacarigua | Women's team |

Jamie Chen Subandhi (born December 15, 1989) is an American badminton player who competes in the singles and mixed doubles category. In the mixed doubles, she is usually partnered with Phillip Chew. Subandhi won gold along with Chew in the mixed doubles category at the 2015 Pan American Games. In 2016, she competed in the mixed doubles event at the Summer Olympics in Rio de Janeiro, Brazil.

== Personal life ==
Subandhi is the daughter of Hengki Tedi Subandhi (father) and Maria (mother), who are of Chinese-Indonesian descent.

== Achievements ==
=== Pan American Games ===
Women's singles
| Year | Venue | Opponent | Score | Result |
|---|---|---|---|---|
| 2015 | Atos Markham Pan Am Centre; Toronto, Ontario, Canada | (Canada) Michelle Li | 11–21, 21–19, 15–21 | Bronze |

Women's doubles
| Year | Venue | Partner | Opponent | Score | Result |
|---|---|---|---|---|---|
| 2007 | Riocentro Sports Complex Pavilion 4B; Rio de Janeiro, Brazil | (United States) Kuei Ya Chen | (Canada) Fiona McKee (Canada) Charmaine Reid | 18–21, 20–22 | Bronze |

Mixed doubles
| Year | Venue | Partner | Opponent | Score | Result |
|---|---|---|---|---|---|
| 2015 | Atos Markham Pan Am Centre; Toronto, Ontario, Canada | (United States) Phillip Chew | (Canada) Toby Ng (Canada) Alexandra Bruce | 21–9, 21–23, 21–12 | Gold |

=== Pan Am Championships ===
Women's singles
| Year | Venue | Opponent | Score | Result |
|---|---|---|---|---|
| 2017 | Sports City Coliseum; Havana, Cuba | (Canada) Brittney Tam | 15–21, 15–21 | Bronze |
| 2014 | Markham Pan Am Centre; Markham, Canada | (Canada) Rachel Honderich | 12–21, 16–21 | Bronze |
| 2013 | Palacio de los Deportes Virgilio Travieso Soto; Santo Domingo, Dominican Republic | (Canada) Michelle Li | 8–21, 6–21 | Silver |
| 2012 | Manuel Bonilla Stadium, Miraflores; Lima, Peru | (Canada) Christin Tsai | 16–21, 19–21 | Silver |

Mixed doubles
| Year | Venue | Partner | Opponent | Score | Result |
|---|---|---|---|---|---|
| 2014 | Markham Pan Am Centre; Markham, Canada | (United States) Phillip Chew | (Canada) Toby Ng (Canada) Alex Bruce | 16–21, 21–19, 18–21 | Silver |
| 2012 | Manuel Bonilla Stadium, Miraflores; Lima, Peru | (United States) Phillip Chew | (Canada) Derrick Ng (Canada) Alex Bruce | 21–14, 10–21, 18–21 | Bronze |

=== BWF International Challenge/Series ===
Women's singles
| Year | Tournament | Opponent | Score | Result |
|---|---|---|---|---|
| 2017 | Carebaco International | (Peru) Daniela Macias | 20–22, 25–23, 21–9 | (gold) Winner |
| 2012 | Miami International | (France) Perrine Lebuhanic | 21–13, 21–11 | (gold) Winner |
| 2012 | Brazil International | (Canada) Nicole Grether | 17–21, 15–21 | (silver) Runner-up |

Women's doubles
| Year | Tournament | Partner | Opponent | Score | Result |
|---|---|---|---|---|---|
| 2018 | Brazil International | (Canada) Rachel Honderich | (United States) Jennie Gai (United States) Jamie Hsu | 21–15, 21–10 | (gold) Winner |
| 2018 | Jamaica International | (United States) Jamie Hsu | (Peru) Ines Castillo (Peru) Paula La Torre Regal | 21–15, 21–8 | (gold) Winner |
| 2007 | Miami Pan Am International | (United States) Kuei Ya Chen | (Canada) Valerie Loker (Canada) Sarah MacMaster | 21–19, 21–16 | (gold) Winner |

Mixed doubles
| Year | Tournament | Partner | Opponent | Score | Result |
|---|---|---|---|---|---|
| 2016 | Yonex / K&D Graphics International | (United States) Howard Shu | (Russia) Evgenij Dremin (Russia) Evgenia Dimova | 6–21, 20–22 | (silver) Runner-up |
| 2016 | Tahiti International | (United States) Phillip Chew | (Russia) Vitalij Durkin (Russia) Nina Vislova | 18–21, 21–16, 8–21 | (silver) Runner-up |
| 2015 | Chile International Challenge | (United States) Phillip Chew | (Brazil) Alex Yuwan Tjong (Brazil) Luana Vicente | 21–14, 21–14 | (gold) Winner |
| 2015 | Sydney International | (United States) Phillip Chew | (Australia) Robin Middleton (Australia) Leanne Choo | 8–21, 17–21 | (silver) Runner-up |
| 2015 | Mercosul International | (United States) Phillip Chew | (Canada) Kevin Li (Canada) Rachel Honderich | 21–11, 21–17 | (gold) Winner |
| 2014 | USA International | (United States) Phillip Chew | (Canada) Toby Ng (Canada) Alex Bruce | 21–18, 23–25, 9–21 | (silver) Runner-up |
| 2014 | Guatemala International | (United States) Phillip Chew | (United States) Howard Shu (United States) Eva Lee | 11–10, 5–11, 10–11, 11–8, 5–11 | (silver) Runner-up |
| 2013 | Brazil International | (United States) Phillip Chew | (Chinese Taipei) Yang Chih-hsun (Canada) Michelle Li | 21–13, 21–19 | (gold) Winner |
| 2013 | Peru International | (United States) Phillip Chew | (Canada) Toby Ng (Canada) Grace Gao | 12–21, 25–23, 17–21 | (silver) Runner-up |
| 2012 | Brazil International | (United States) Phillip Chew | (Brazil) Hugo Arthuso (Brazil) Fabiana Silva | 21–19, 21–16 | (gold) Winner |

BWF International Challenge tournament
BWF International Series tournament
BWF Future Series tournament
