= Kevin Li (badminton) =

Canadian badminton player (born 1986)

Kevin Li 李家玮
Personal information
- Born: 11 July 1986 (age 40) Hong Kong
- Height: 1.73 m (5 ft 8 in)

Sport
- Country: Canada
- Sport: Badminton
- Coached by: Jennifer Lee

Men's & mixed doubles
- Highest ranking: 63 (MD 23 Sep 2015); 73 (XD 21 Apr 2011)
- BWF profile
Medal record
Men's badminton
Representing Canada
Pan Am Championships
Gold medal – first place	2014 Markham	Mixed team
Gold medal – first place	2013 Santo Domingo	Mixed team
Silver medal – second place	2013 Santo Domingo	Men's doubles
Silver medal – second place	2010 Curitiba	Mixed doubles
Bronze medal – third place	2009 Guadalajara	Mixed doubles

Kevin Li (born 11 July 1986) is a Canadian badminton player from the Lee's badminton club. In 2013, he won the silver medal at the Pan Am Championships in the men's doubles event partnered with Nyl Yakura, they were defeated by their compatriots Adrian Liu and Derrick Ng in the finals round. In the team event he won the gold medal.

== Achievements ==
=== Pan Am Championships ===
Men's doubles
Year	Venue	Partner	Opponent	Score	Result
2013	Palacio de los Deportes Virgilio Travieso Soto; Santo Domingo, Dominican Republic	(Canada) Nyl Yakura	(Canada) Adrian Liu (Canada) Derrick Ng	21–17, 6–21, 16–21	Silver

Mixed doubles
Year	Venue	Partner	Opponent	Score	Result
2010	Clube Curitibano; Curitiba, Brazil	(Canada) Alexandra Bruce	(Canada) Toby Ng (Canada) Grace Gao	7–21, 9–21	Silver
2009	Coliseo Olímpico de la Universidad de Guadalajara; Guadalajara, Mexico	(Canada) Alexandra Bruce	(Canada) Alexander Pang (Canada) Joycelin Ko	18–21, 21–19, 18–21	Bronze

=== BWF International Challenge/Series ===
Men's doubles
Year	Tournament	Partner	Opponent	Score	Result
2011	Puerto Rico International	(Canada) Francoise Bourret	(Canada) Adrian Liu (Canada) Derrick Ng	9–21, 16–21	(silver) Runner-up
2011	Santo Domingo Open	(Canada) Francoise Bourret	(Jamaica) Gareth Henry (Jamaica) Charles Pyne	21–19, 6–21, 12–21	(silver) Runner-up

Mixed doubles
Year	Tournament	Partner	Opponent	Score	Result
2015	Mercosul International	(Canada) Rachel Honderich	(United States) Phillip Chew (United States) Jamie Subandhi	11–21, 17–21	(silver) Runner-up

BWF International Challenge tournament
BWF International Series tournament
BWF Future Series tournament
