= Badminton at the 2011 Pan American Games – Women's doubles =

Badminton – Women's doubles at the 2011 Pan American Games
- Venue: Multipurpose Gymnasium
- Dates: October 15 - October 20
- Competitors: 38 from 13 nations

Medalists
Gold medal	Alex Bruce; Michelle Li	Canada
Silver medal	Iris Wang; Rena Wang	United States
Bronze medal	Grace Gao; Joycelyn Ko	Canada
Bronze medal	Eva Lee; Paula Lynn Obañana	United States

The women's doubles badminton event at the 2011 Pan American Games was held from October 15–19 at the Multipurpose Gymnasium in Guadalajara. The defending Pan American Games champions were Eva Lee and Mesinee Mangkalakiri of the United States, while the defending Pan American Championship champions were Grace Gao and Joycelyn Ko of Canada. The women's doubles was the first badminton event to be completed at the Games.

The athletes were drawn into an elimination stage draw. Once a team lost a match it was no longer able to compete. Each match was contested as the best of three games.

The draw for the competition was done on October 7, 2011.

== Seeds ==
1. Iris Wang / Rena Wang (USA) (finals)
2. Alex Bruce / Michelle Li (CAN) (champions)
3. Eva Lee / Paula Lynn Obañana (USA) (semifinals)
4. Grace Gao / Joycelyn Ko (CAN) (semifinals)

== Results ==
=== Finals ===
Semifinals
1	Iris Wang (United States) Rena Wang (USA)	21	10	21
4	Grace Gao (Canada) Joycelyn Ko (CAN)	10	21	12
3	Eva Lee (United States) Paula Lynn Obañana (USA)	21	16	19
2	Alexandra Bruce (Canada) Michelle Li (CAN)	12	21	21

Final
1	Iris Wang (United States) Rena Wang (USA)	15	15
2	Alexandra Bruce (Canada) Michelle Li (CAN)	21	21

=== Top half ===
First Round
M Eliezer (Brazil) F Silva (BRA)	10	10
L Duany (Peru) A Monteverde (PER)	21	21

Second Round
1	I Wang (United States) R Wang (USA)	21	21
P Saravia (Guatemala) N Sotomayor (GUA)	7	6
C González (Mexico) V Montero (MEX)	21	21
C Leefmans (Suriname) P Tjitrodipo (SUR)	5	19
4	G Gao (Canada) J Ko (CAN)	21	21
C Macaya (Chile) N Norambuena (CHI)	5	14
D Araujo (Venezuela) L Tovar (VEN)	13	4
L Duany (Peru) A Monteverde (PER)	21	21

Quarterfinals
1	I Wang (United States) R Wang (USA)	21	21
C González (Mexico) V Montero (MEX)	15	10
4	G Gao (Canada) J Ko (CAN)	21	21
L Duany (Peru) A Monteverde (PER)	11	7

Semifinals
1	I Wang (United States) R Wang (USA)	21	10	21
4	G Gao (Canada) J Ko (CAN)	10	21	12

=== Bottom half ===
First Round
C Aicardi (Peru) C Rivero (PER)	26	21
M Hernandez (Cuba) C Mislenis (CUB)	24	16
G Araujo (Venezuela) J Quintero (VEN)	13	9
O Cabrera (Dominican Republic) B Vibieca (DOM)	21	21

Second Round
C Aicardi (Peru) C Rivero (PER)	21	21
A de Leon (Guatemala) M del Valle (GUA)	10	7
L Vicente (Brazil) L Vicente (BRA)	7	11
3	E Lee (United States) P L Obañana (USA)	21	21
O Cabrera (Dominican Republic) B Vibieca (DOM)	17	21	21
M Haldane (Jamaica) K Wynter (JAM)	21	17	14
N Rangel (Mexico) M Ugalde (MEX)	13	16
2	A Bruce (Canada) M Li (CAN)	21	21

Quarterfinals
C Aicardi (Peru) C Rivero (PER)	6	11
3	E Lee (United States) P L Obañana (USA)	21	21
O Cabrera (Dominican Republic) B Vibieca (DOM)	4	5
2	A Bruce (Canada) M Li (CAN)	21	21

Semifinals
3	E Lee (United States) P L Obañana (USA)	21	16	19
2	A Bruce (Canada) M Li (CAN)	12	21	21
