= Badminton at the 2015 Pan American Games – Women's doubles =

Badminton – Women's doubles at the 2015 Pan American Games
- Venue: Atos Markham Pan Am Centre
- Dates: July 11 - July 16, 2015
- Competitors: 28 from 11 nations

Medalists
Gold medal	Eva Lee; Paula Lynn Obañana	United States
Silver medal	Lohaynny Vicente; Luana Vicente	Brazil
Bronze medal	Rachel Honderich; Michelle Li	Canada
Bronze medal	Alex Bruce; Phyllis Chan	Canada

The women's doubles badminton event at the 2015 Pan American Games will be held from July 11–16 at the Atos Markham Pan Am Centre in Toronto. The defending Pan American Games champions are Alex Bruce and Michelle Li of Canada.

The athletes will be drawn into an elimination stage draw. Once a team lost a match, it will be not longer able to compete. Each match will be contested as the best of three games of 21 points.

== Schedule ==
All times are Central Standard Time (UTC-6).

Date	Time	Round
July 12, 2015	9:00	First Round
July 13, 2015	11:00	Quarterfinals
July 14, 2015	10:00	Semifinals
July 15, 2015	14:00	Final

== Seeds ==
1. Eva Lee / Paula Lynn Obañana (USA) (champions)
2. Lohaynny Vicente / Luana Vicente (BRA) (final)

== Results ==
=== Finals ===
Semifinals
1	Eva Lee (United States) Paula Lynn Obañana (USA)	21	21
Rachel Honderich (Canada) Michelle Li (CAN)	11	8
Alex Bruce (Canada) Phyllis Chan (CAN)	20	14
2	Lohaynny Vicente (Brazil) Luana Vicente (BRA)	22	21

Final
1	Eva Lee (United States) Paula Lynn Obañana (USA)	21	21
2	Lohaynny Vicente (Brazil) Luana Vicente (BRA)	14	6

=== Top half ===
First round
R Williams (Jamaica) K Wynter (JAM)	13	7
D Macias (Peru) D Nishimura (PER)	21	21
D Corleto (Guatemala) M Paiz (GUA)	4	8
R Honderich (Canada) M Li (CAN)	21	21
PB Pereira (Brazil) F Silva (BRA)	21	19	14
H Gaitan (Mexico) C González (MEX)	14	21	21

Quarterfinals
1	E Lee (United States) PL Obanana (USA)	21	21
D Macias (Peru) D Nishimura (PER)	6	10
R Honderich (Canada) M Li (CAN)	21	21
H Gaitan (Mexico) C González (MEX)	11	9

Semifinal
1	E Lee (United States) PL Obanana (USA)	21	21
R Honderich (Canada) M Li (CAN)	11	8

=== Bottom half ===
First round
T Chou (Chile) C Macaya (CHI)	11	21
A Bruce (Canada) P Chan (CAN)	21	23
M Azcuy Perez (Cuba) T Oropeza (CUB)	8	7
K Winder (Peru) LM Zornoza (PER)	21	21
B Polanco (Dominican Republic) D Saturria (DOM)	21	21
F Bernatene (Argentina) D Garmendia (ARG)	8	12

Quarterfinals
A Bruce (Canada) P Chan (CAN)	21	21
K Winder (Peru) LM Zornoza (PER)	6	10
B Polanco (Dominican Republic) D Saturria (DOM)	8	10
2	Lo Vicente (Brazil) Lu Vicente (BRA)	21	21

Semifinal
A Bruce (Canada) P Chan (CAN)	20	14
2	Lo Vicente (Brazil) Lu Vicente (BRA)	22	21
