= Badminton at the 2019 Pan American Games – Women's singles =

Badminton – Women's singles at the 2019 Pan American Games
- Venue: Polideportivo 3
- Dates: July 29 – August 2
- Competitors: 36 from 21 nations

Medalists
Gold medal	Michelle Li	Canada
Silver medal	Rachel Honderich	Canada
Bronze medal	Iris Wang	United States
Bronze medal	Nikté Sotomayor	Guatemala

The women's singles badminton event at the 2019 Pan American Games will be held from July 29 – August 2nd at the Polideportivo 3 in Lima, Peru. The defending Pan American Games champion is Michelle Li of Canada.

Each National Olympic Committee could enter a maximum of three athletes into the competition. The athletes will be drawn into an elimination stage draw. Once an athlete lost a match, they will be no longer able to compete. Each match will be contested as the best of three games.

== Seeds ==
The following athletes were seeded:

1. Michelle Li (CAN) (champion)
2. Rachel Honderich (CAN) (final)
3. Daniela Macías (PER) (quarterfinals)
4. Fabiana Silva (BRA) (quarterfinals)
5. Tahimara Oropeza (CUB) (quarterfinals)
6. Iris Wang (USA) (semifinals)
7. Nikté Sotomayor (GUA) (semifinals)
8. Diana Corleto (GUA) (second round)

== Results ==
=== Finals ===
Semifinals
1	Michelle Li (CAN)	21	21
6	Iris Wang (USA)	10	5
7	Nikté Sotomayor (GUA)	8	10
2	Rachel Honderich (CAN)	21	21

Final
1	Michelle Li (CAN)	21	21
2	Rachel Honderich (CAN)	11	19

=== Top half ===
==== Section 1 ====
First Round
T Sanchez (VEN)	12	18
Y Ortiz (CUB)	21	21

Second Round
1	M Li (CAN)	21	21
B Polanco (DOM)	17	12
P Ramdhani (GUY)	15	18
L Villalobos (CRC)	21	21
8	D Corleto (GUA)	10	18
H Gaitan (MEX)	21	21
J Lima (BRA)	21	21
Y Ortiz (CUB)	12	12

Third Round
1	M Li (CAN)	21	21
L Villalobos (CRC)	7	13
H Gaitan (MEX)	22	21
J Lima (BRA)	20	19

Quarterfinals
1	M Li (CAN)	21	26
H Gaitan (MEX)	9	24

==== Section 2 ====
First Round
K Wynter (JAM)	21	21
K Yau (PAN)	4	3

Second Round
3	D Macías (PER)	21	21
C Naranjo (CHI)	7	4
A Valero (MEX)	21	21
N Blake (TRI)	6	12
6	I Wang (USA)	21	21
F Centeno (ESA)	8	8
S Scott (BAR)	20	11
K Wynter (JAM)	22	21

Third Round
3	D Macías (PER)	21	21
A Valero (MEX)	11	12
6	I Wang (USA)	21	21
K Wynter (JAM)	4	6

Quarterfinals
3	D Macías (PER)	10	12
6	I Wang (USA)	21	21

=== Bottom half ===
==== Section 3 ====
First Round
M D Zambrano (ECU)	21	21
A Montre (CHI)	12	10

Second Round
M D Zambrano (ECU)	21	21
M G Ortiz (CUB)	14	13
J Giraldo (COL)	8	16
7	N Sotomayor (GUA)	21	21
I Castillo (PER)	21	21
C Pie (DOM)	10	2
S Solis (MEX)	11	16
4	F Silva (BRA)	21	21

Third Round
M D Zambrano (ECU)	7	21	9
7	N Sotomayor (GUA)	21	19	21
I Castillo (PER)	18	8
4	F Silva (BRA)	21	21

Quarterfinals
7	N Sotomayor (GUA)	13	21	21
4	F Silva (BRA)	21	19	13

==== Section 4 ====
First Round
J Siviora (BOL)	7	4
T Williams (BAR)	21	21

Second Round
T Williams (BAR)	21	21
T Richardson (JAM)	19	15
I Gualdi (ARG)	5	12
5	T Oropeza (CUB)	21	21
N Jiménez (DOM)	21	21
A Paiz (GUA)	13	16
S Lima (BRA)	14	11
2	R Honderich (CAN)	21	21

Third Round
T Williams (BAR)	11	10
5	T Oropeza (CUB)	21	21
N Jiménez (DOM)	11	10
2	R Honderich (CAN)	21	21

Quarterfinals
5	T Oropeza (CUB)	13	10
2	R Honderich (CAN)	21	21
