= Rachel Honderich =

Canadian badminton player (born 1996)

Personal information
- Born: 21 April 1996 (age 30) Toronto, Ontario, Canada
- Years active: 2013–present
- Height: 1.75 m (5 ft 9 in)
- Weight: 64 kg (141 lb)

Sport
- Country: Canada
- Sport: Badminton
- Handedness: Right
- Coached by: Jennifer Lee; Mike Butler

Women's singles & doubles
- Highest ranking: 36 (WS 22 November 2018); 18 (WD with Kristen Tsai 18 November 2022); 41 (XD with Toby Ng 29 June 2017)
- Current ranking: 24 (WD with Kristen Tsai 21 February 2023)
- BWF profile
Medal record
Women's badminton
Representing Canada
Pan American Games
Gold medal – first place	2019 Lima	Women's doubles
Silver medal – second place	2015 Toronto	Women's singles
Silver medal – second place	2019 Lima	Women's singles
Bronze medal – third place	2015 Toronto	Women's doubles
Pan Am Championships
Gold medal – first place	2017 Havana	Women's singles
Gold medal – first place	2017 Havana	Mixed doubles
Gold medal – first place	2018 Guatemala City	Women's doubles
Gold medal – first place	2019 Aguascalientes	Women's doubles
Gold medal – first place	2021 Guatemala City	Women's doubles
Gold medal – first place	2022 San Salvador	Women's doubles
Gold medal – first place	2023 Kingston	Mixed doubles
Silver medal – second place	2014 Markham	Women's singles
Silver medal – second place	2018 Guatemala City	Women's singles
Pan Am Mixed Team Championships
Gold medal – first place	2014 Markham	Mixed team
Gold medal – first place	2023 Guadalajara	Mixed team
Pan Am Female Cup
Gold medal – first place	2020 Salvador	Women's team
Silver medal – second place	2022 Acapulco	Women's team

Rachel Honderich (born 21 April 1996) is a Canadian badminton player from Toronto, Ontario. She has been one of the top ranked women's individual and doubles player on the continent and a contender in major international competitions. She is a vice-national champion in women's singles and has won several international titles since 2010.

== Career ==
Honderich won her first senior international title at the 2014 Czech International tournament in the women's doubles partnered with Michelle Li. Honderich clinched the silver and bronze medals at the 2015 Pan American Games in the women's singles and doubles respectively. At the 2017 Pan American Championships, she crowned double titles, won the women's singles and mixed doubles event. She competed at the 2014 and 2018 Commonwealth Games. Honderich won her first gold medal at the Pan American Games in the women's doubles partnered with Kristen Tsai in 2019 Lima.

In June 2021, Honderich was named to Canada's Olympic team.

== Achievements ==
=== Pan American Games ===
Women's singles
Year	Venue	Opponent	Score	Result
2015	Atos Markham Pan Am Centre, Toronto, Canada	(Canada) Michelle Li	15–21, 9–21	Silver
2019	Polideportivo 3, Lima, Peru	(Canada) Michelle Li	11–21, 19–21	Silver

Women's doubles
Year	Venue	Partner	Opponent	Score	Result
2015	Atos Markham Pan Am Centre, Toronto, Canada	(Canada) Michelle Li	(United States) Eva Lee (United States) Paula Lynn Obañana	11–21, 8–21	Bronze
2019	Polideportivo 3, Lima, Peru	(Canada) Kristen Tsai	(United States) Keui-Ya Chen (United States) Jamie Hsu	21–10, 21–9	Gold

=== Pan Am Championships ===
Women's singles
Year	Venue	Opponent	Score	Result
2014	Markham Pan Am Centre, Markham, Canada	(Canada) Michelle Li	13–21, 16–21	Silver
2017	Sports City Coliseum, Havana, Cuba	(Canada) Brittney Tam	21–8, 12–21, 21–7	Gold
2018	Teodoro Palacios Flores Gymnasium, Guatemala City, Guatemala	(Canada) Michelle Li	15–21, 16–21	Silver

Women's doubles
Year	Venue	Partner	Opponent	Score	Result
2018	Teodoro Palacios Flores Gymnasium, Guatemala City, Guatemala	(Canada) Kristen Tsai	(Canada) Michelle Tong (Canada) Josephine Wu	17–21, 21–17, 21–14	Gold
2019	Gimnasio Olímpico, Aguascalientes, Mexico	(Canada) Kristen Tsai	(Canada) Catherine Choi (Canada) Josephine Wu	21–15, 27–25	Gold
2021	Sagrado Corazon de Jesus, Guatemala City, Guatemala	(Canada) Kristen Tsai	(United States) Francesca Corbett (United States) Alison Lee	21–12, 21–7	Gold
2022	Palacio de los Deportes Carlos "El Famoso" Hernández; San Salvador, El Salvador	(Canada) Kristen Tsai	(Canada) Catherine Choi (Canada) Josephine Wu	21–17, 21–18	Gold

Mixed doubles
Year	Venue	Partner	Opponent	Score	Result
2017	Sports City Coliseum, Havana, Cuba	(Canada) Toby Ng	(Canada) Nyl Yakura (Canada) Brittney Tam	21–13, 21–14	Gold
2023	G.C. Foster College of Physical Education and Sport; Kingston, Jamaica	(Canada) Joshua Hurlburt-Yu	(Canada) Ty Alexander Lindeman (Canada) Josephine Wu	22–20, 18–21, 21–17	Gold

=== BWF Grand Prix (2 runners-up) ===
The BWF Grand Prix had two levels, the Grand Prix and Grand Prix Gold. It was a series of badminton tournaments sanctioned by the Badminton World Federation (BWF) and played between 2007 and 2017.

Women's singles
Year	Tournament	Opponent	Score	Result
2014	U.S. Grand Prix	(United States) Beiwen Zhang	11–21, 13–21	(silver) Runner-up

Mixed doubles
Year	Tournament	Partner	Opponent	Score	Result
2016	Brasil Open	(Canada) Toby Ng	(India) Pranaav Jerry Chopra (India) N. Sikki Reddy	15–21, 16–21	(silver) Runner-up

BWF Grand Prix Gold tournament
BWF Grand Prix tournament

=== BWF International Challenge/Series (12 titles, 6 runners-up) ===
Women's singles
Year	Tournament	Opponent	Score	Result
2016	Yonex / K&D Graphics International	(United States) Beiwen Zhang	13–21, 12–21	(silver) Runner-up
2017	Jamaica International	(Slovakia) Martina Repiská	15–21, 21–19, 21–15	(gold) Winner
2018	Brazil International	(Switzerland) Sabrina Jaquet	21–15, 15–21, 21–14	(gold) Winner

Women's doubles
Year	Tournament	Partner	Opponent	Score	Result
2014	Czech International	(Canada) Michelle Li	(Russia) Irina Khlebko (Russia) Elena Komendrovskaja	21–12, 21–17	(gold) Winner
2017	Jamaica International	(Australia) Leanne Choo	(Jamaica) Mikaylia Haldane (Jamaica) Katherine Wynter	21–2, 21–8	(gold) Winner
2017	Yonex / K&D Graphics International	(Canada) Kristen Tsai	(Australia) Leanne Choo (Australia) Renuga Veeran	21–12, 21–15	(gold) Winner
2018	Brazil International	(United States) Jamie Subandhi	(United States) Jennie Gai (United States) Jamie Hsu	21–15, 21–10	(gold) Winner
2018	Yonex / K&D Graphics International	(Canada) Kristen Tsai	(Chinese Taipei) Hung Shih-han (Chinese Taipei) Yu Chien-hui	21–19, 21–15	(gold) Winner
2019	Brazil International	(Canada) Kristen Tsai	(France) Émilie Lefel (France) Anne Tran	21–18, 17–21, 21–19	(gold) Winner
2019	Kharkiv International	(Canada) Kristen Tsai	(England) Chloe Birch (England) Lauren Smith	14–21, 18–21	(silver) Runner-up
2019	Belgian International	(Canada) Kristen Tsai	(Bulgaria) Gabriela Stoeva (Bulgaria) Stefani Stoeva	16–21, 15–21	(silver) Runner-up
2019	Hungarian International	(Canada) Kristen Tsai	(Sweden) Emma Karlsson (Sweden) Johanna Magnusson	21–16, 21–16	(gold) Winner
2019	Yonex / K&D Graphics International	(Canada) Kristen Tsai	(Australia) Setyana Mapasa (Australia) Gronya Somerville	21–14, 9–21, 18–21	(silver) Runner-up
2021	Scottish Open	(Canada) Kristen Tsai	(Malaysia) Anna Cheong (Malaysia) Teoh Mei Xing	21–14, 21–12	(gold) Winner
2023	Canadian International	(Canada) Jacqueline Cheung	(Canada) Jackie Dent (Canada) Crystal Lai	21–16, 21–17	(gold) Winner

Mixed doubles
Year	Tournament	Partner	Opponent	Score	Result
2015	Mercosul International	(Canada) Kevin Li	(United States) Phillip Chew (United States) Jamie Subandhi	11–21, 17–21	(silver) Runner-up
2017	Jamaica International	(Canada) Toby Ng	(Jamaica) Dennis Coke (Jamaica) Katherine Wynter	21–9, 21–8	(gold) Winner
2023	Portugal International	(Canada) Joshua Hurlburt-Yu	(Denmark) Andreas Søndergaard (Denmark) Iben Bergstein	19–21, 20–22	(silver) Runner-up

BWF International Challenge tournament
BWF International Series tournament
BWF Future Series tournament
