= 2013 Pan Am Badminton Championships =

The XVIII 2013 Pan Am Badminton Championships were held in Santo Domingo, Dominican Republic, between October 24 and October 27, 2013.

This event was part of the 2013 BWF Grand Prix Gold and Grand Prix series of the Badminton World Federation.

== Venue ==
- Palacio de los Deportes Virgilio Travieso Soto, Santo Domingo

== Medalists ==
Event	Gold	Silver	Bronze
Men's singles	(Cuba) Osleni Guerrero	(United States) Sattawat Pongnairat	(United States) Howard Shu
Men's singles	(Cuba) Osleni Guerrero	(United States) Sattawat Pongnairat	(Brazil) Daniel Paiola
Women's singles	(Canada) Michelle Li	(United States) Jamie Subandhi	(Trinidad and Tobago) Solangel Guzman
Women's singles	(Canada) Michelle Li	(United States) Jamie Subandhi	(Brazil) Fabiana Silva
Men's doubles	(Canada) Adrian Liu and Derrick Ng	(Canada) Kevin Li and Nyl Yakura	(Dominican Republic) Nelson Javier and Alberto Raposo
Men's doubles	(Canada) Adrian Liu and Derrick Ng	(Canada) Kevin Li and Nyl Yakura	(Guatemala) Solis Jonathan and Rudolfo Ramirez
Women's doubles	(United States) Eva Lee and Paula Lynn Obanana	(Canada) Alexandra Bruce and Phyllis Chan	(Canada) Grace Gao and Michelle Li
Women's doubles	(United States) Eva Lee and Paula Lynn Obanana	(Canada) Alexandra Bruce and Phyllis Chan	(Peru) Daniela Macias and Danica Nishimura
Mixed doubles	(Canada) Toby Ng and Alexandra Bruce	(United States) Howard Shu and Eva Lee	(Brazil) Hugo Arthuso and Fabiana Silva
Mixed doubles	(Canada) Toby Ng and Alexandra Bruce	(United States) Howard Shu and Eva Lee	(Brazil) Daniel Paiola and Paula Pereira
Teams	Canada	United States	Brazil
