= Badminton at the 2015 Pan American Games – Women's singles =

Badminton – Women's singles at the 2015 Pan American Games
- Venue: Atos Markham Pan Am Centre
- Dates: July 11 - July 16
- Competitors: 34 from 17 nations

Medalists
Gold medal	Michelle Li	Canada
Silver medal	Rachel Honderich	Canada
Bronze medal	Jamie Subandhi	United States
Bronze medal	Iris Wang	United States

The women's singles badminton event at the 2015 Pan American Games will be held from July 11- 16 at the Atos Markham Pan Am Centre in Toronto. The defending Pan American Games champion is Michelle Li of Canada.

The athletes will be drawn into an elimination stage draw. Once a team lost a match, it will be not longer able to compete. Each match will be contested as the best of three games.

== Schedule ==
All times are Central Standard Time (UTC-6).

Date	Time	Round
July 11, 2015	9:35	First Round
July 11, 2015	10:10	Second Round
July 12, 2015	11:55	Third Round
July 13, 2015	10:00	Quarterfinals
July 14, 2015	17:30	Semifinals
July 16, 2015	14:00	Final

== Seeds ==
1. Michelle Li (CAN) (Champion)
2. Iris Wang (USA) (Semifinals)
3. Jamie Subandhi (USA) (Semifinals)
4. Rachel Honderich (CAN) (Finals)
5. Fabiana Silva (BRA) (Quarterfinals)
6. Lohaynny Vicente (BRA) (Quarterfinals)
7. Daniela Macías (PER) (Quarterfinals)
8. Haramara Gaitan (MEX) (Quarterfinals)

== Results ==
=== Finals ===
Semifinals
1	Michelle Li (CAN)	21	19	21
3	Jamie Subandhi (USA)	11	21	15
4	Rachel Honderich (CAN)	21	21
2	Iris Wang (USA)	15	11

Final
1	Michelle Li (CAN)	21	21
4	Rachel Honderich (CAN)	15	9

=== Top half ===
==== Section 1 ====
First Round

Second Round
1	M Li (CAN)	21	21
B Berruezo (ARG)	4	5
F Centeno (ESA)	21	21
F Bernatene (ARG)	15	16
6	Lo Vicente (BRA)	21	21
M Azcuy Perez (CUB)	10	9
T Chou (CHI)	21	21
R Williams (JAM)	16	8

Third Round
1	M Li (CAN)	21	21
F Centeno (ESA)	4	10
6	Lo Vicente (BRA)	21	21
T Chou (CHI)	10	10

Quarterfinals
1	M Li (CAN)	21	21
6	Lo Vicente (BRA)	7	18

==== Section 2 ====
First Round
D Nishimura (PER)	21	21
A Artiz (CUB)	17	16

Second Round
3	J Subandhi (USA)	21	21
D Corleto (GUA)	5	2
P Ramdhani (GUY)	5	9
B Polanco (DOM)	21	21
8	H Gaitan (MEX)	21	21
S Scott (BAR)	3	11
L M Zornoza (PER)	21	21	21
D Nishimura (PER)	14	23	18

Third Round
3	J Subandhi (USA)	21	21
B Polanco (DOM)	13	6
8	H Gaitan (MEX)	18	21	21
L M Zornoza (PER)	21	12	17

Quarterfinals
3	J Subandhi (USA)	21	21
8	H Gaitan (MEX)	12	11

=== Bottom half ===
==== Section 3 ====
First Round
N Sotomayor (GUA)	15	17
M Ugalde (MEX)	21	21

Second Round
M Ugalde (MEX)	21	21
K Wynter (JAM)	14	12
P Tjitrodipo (SUR)	5	4
5	F Silva (BRA)	21	21
S Solis (MEX)	21	21
M Zambrano (ECU)	15	17
T Oropeza (CUB)	6	16
4	R Honderich (CAN)	21	21

Third Round
M Ugalde (MEX)	18	16
5	F Silva (BRA)	21	21
S Solis (MEX)	13	9
4	R Honderich (CAN)	21	21

Quarterfinals
5	F Silva (BRA)	16	10
4	R Honderich (CAN)	21	21

==== Section 4 ====
First Round

Second Round
A Paiz (GUA)	21	19	21
D Garmendia (ARG)	13	21	13
D Saturria (DOM)	6	7
7	D Macias (PER)	21	21
Lu Vicente (BRA)	21	21
C Macaya (CHI)	17	11
D Ortiz Prada (VEN)	4	6
2	I Wang (USA)	21	21

Third Round
A Paiz (GUA)	3	2
7	D Macias (PER)	21	21
Lu Vicente (BRA)	8	12
2	I Wang (USA)	21	21

Quarterfinals
7	D Macias (PER)	9	6
2	I Wang (USA)	21	21
