= Toby Ng =

Canadian badminton player

Toby Ng 吴骏义 OLY
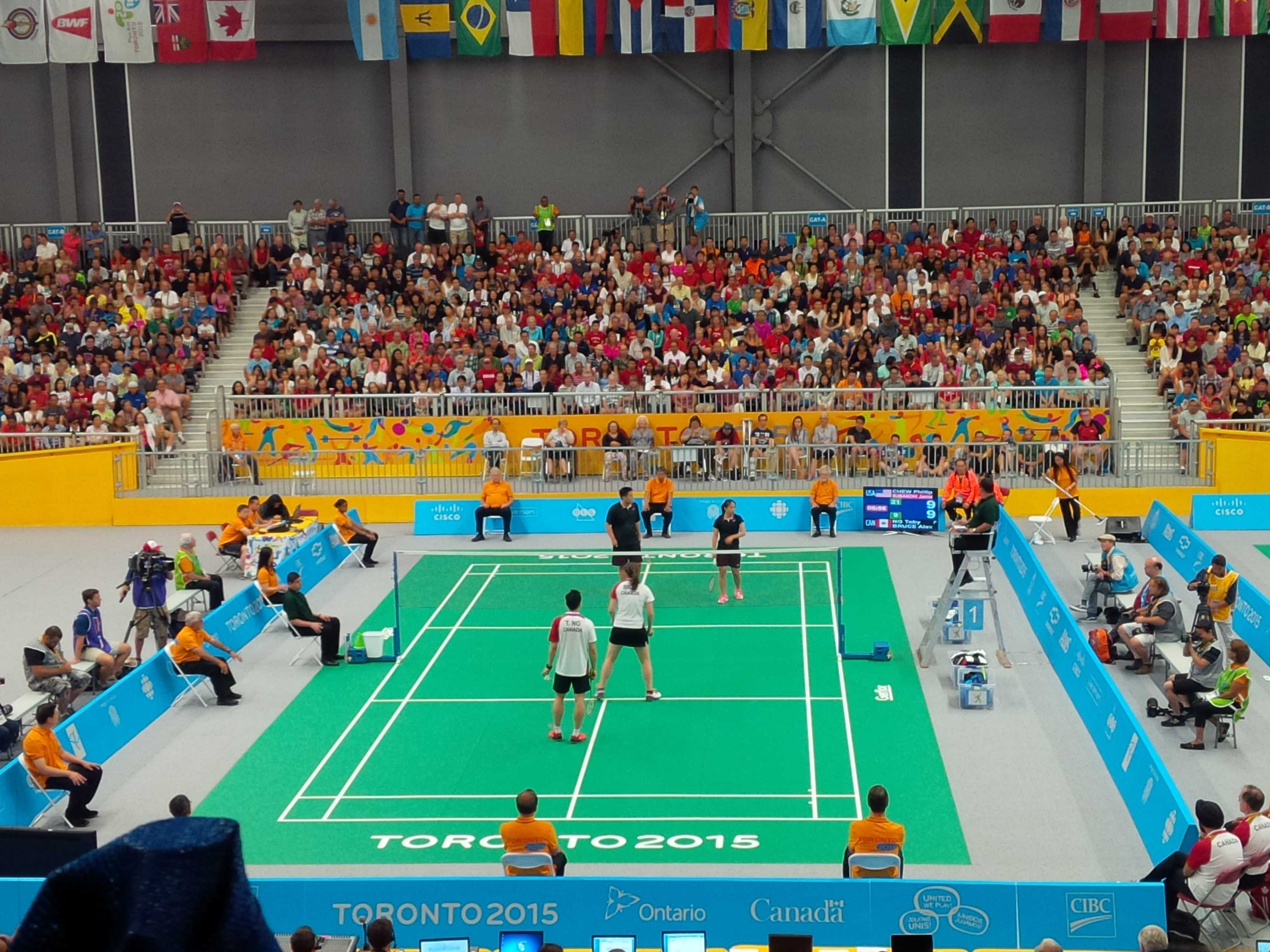
- Toby Ng badminton player

Personal information
- Born: Tobias Ng; 8 October 1985 (age 41) Vancouver, British Columbia, Canada
- Height: 1.81 m (5 ft 11 in)
- Weight: 68 kg (150 lb)

Sport
- Country: Canada
- Sport: Badminton
- Handedness: Right
- Coached by: Kim Dong-moon; Darryl Yung

Men's singles and doubles
- Highest ranking: 189 (MS 5 September 2013); 48 (MD 8 October 2009); 16 (XD 9 December 2010)
- BWF profile
Medal record
Men's badminton
Representing Canada
Pan American Games
| Silver medal – second place | 2015 Toronto | Mixed doubles |
| Gold medal – first place | 2011 Guadalajara | Mixed doubles |
Pan Am Championships
| Gold medal – first place | 2017 Havana | Mixed doubles |
| Gold medal – first place | 2014 Markham | Mixed doubles |
| Gold medal – first place | 2014 Markham | Mixed team |
| Gold medal – first place | 2013 Santo Domingo | Mixed doubles |
| Gold medal – first place | 2013 Santo Domingo | Mixed team |
| Gold medal – first place | 2012 Lima | Mixed team |
| Gold medal – first place | 2010 Curitiba | Mixed doubles |
| Gold medal – first place | 2010 Curitiba | Mixed team |
| Gold medal – first place | 2009 Guadalajara | Mixed doubles |
| Gold medal – first place | 2009 Guadalajara | Mixed team |
| Gold medal – first place | 2008 Lima | Men's doubles |
| Silver medal – second place | 2008 Lima | Mixed doubles |
| Bronze medal – third place | 2007 Calgary | Men's doubles |

Tobias Ng (born 8 October 1985) is a Canadian badminton player. Born and raised in Vancouver, British Columbia, Ng's father is from Hong Kong and his mother from Macau. He started playing badminton at the Kensington Community Centre, when he was about six years old. He competed at the 2012 Summer Olympics in the mixed doubles event with partner Grace Gao. His younger brother, Derrick Ng, is also an elite level player. Since 2020, Toby coaches advanced to professional level athletes at the Bellevue Badminton Club.

== Achievements ==
=== Pan American Games ===
Mixed doubles
| Year | Venue | Partner | Opponent | Score | Result |
|---|---|---|---|---|---|
| 2015 | Atos Markham Pan Am Centre; Toronto, Ontario, Canada | (Canada) Alexandra Bruce | (United States) Phillip Chew (United States) Jamie Subandhi | 9–21, 23–21, 12–21 | Silver |
| 2011 | Multipurpose Gymnasium; Guadalajara, Mexico | (Canada) Grace Gao | (United States) Halim Ho (United States) Eva Lee | 21–13, 9–21, 21–17 | Gold |

=== Pan Am Championships ===
Men's doubles
| Year | Venue | Partner | Opponent | Score | Result |
|---|---|---|---|---|---|
| 2008 | Club de Regatas; Lima, Peru | (Canada) William Milroy | (Guatemala) Rodolfo Ramirez (Guatemala) Kevin Cordón | 21–16, 21–9 | Gold |
| 2007 | Calgary Winter Club; Calgary, Alberta, Canada | (Canada) Kyle Holoboff | (United States) Bob Malaythong (United States) Howard Bach | 19–21, 10–21 | Bronze |

Mixed doubles
| Year | Venue | Partner | Opponent | Score | Result |
|---|---|---|---|---|---|
| 2017 | Sports City Coliseum; Havana, Cuba | (Canada) Rachel Honderich | (Canada) Nyl Yakura (Canada) Brittney Tam | 21–13, 21–14 | Gold |
| 2014 | Markham Pan Am Centre; Markham, Canada | (Canada) Alexandra Bruce | (United States) Phillip Chew (United States) Jamie Subandhi | 21–16, 19–21, 21–18 | Gold |
| 2013 | Palacio de los Deportes Virgilio Travieso Soto; Santo Domingo, Dominican Republic | (Canada) Alexandra Bruce | (United States) Howard Shu (United States) Eva Lee | 21–12, 23–21 | Gold |
| 2010 | Clube Curitibano; Curitiba, Brazil | (Canada) Grace Gao | (Canada) Kevin Li (Canada) Alexandra Bruce | 21–7, 21–9 | Gold |
| 2009 | Coliseo Olímpico de la Universidad de Guadalajara; Guadalajara, Mexico | (Canada) Grace Gao | (Canada) Alexander Pang (Canada) Jocelyn Ko | 21–15, 21–16 | Gold |
| 2008 | Club de Regatas; Lima, Peru | (Canada) Valerie Loker | (Canada) William Milroy (Canada) Fiona McKee | 12–21, 21–16, 18–21 | Silver |

=== BWF Grand Prix ===
The BWF Grand Prix has two levels: Grand Prix and Grand Prix Gold. It is a series of badminton tournaments, sanctioned by Badminton World Federation (BWF) since 2007.

Men's doubles
| Year | Tournament | Partner | Opponent | Score | Result |
|---|---|---|---|---|---|
| 2016 | Canada Open | (Canada) Adrian Liu | (India) Manu Attri (India) B. Sumeeth Reddy | 8–21, 14–21 | (silver) Runner-up |

Mixed doubles
| Year | Tournament | Partner | Opponent | Score | Result |
|---|---|---|---|---|---|
| 2016 | Brasil Open | (Canada) Rachel Honderich | (India) Pranaav Jerry Chopra (India) N. Sikki Reddy | 15–21, 16–21 | (silver) Runner-up |

BWF Grand Prix Gold tournament
BWF Grand Prix tournament

=== BWF International Challenge/Series ===
Men's doubles
| Year | Tournament | Partner | Opponent | Score | Result |
|---|---|---|---|---|---|
| 2010 | Puerto Rico International | (Canada) Jon Vandervet | (United States) Sammera Gunatileka (United States) Vincent Nguy | 21–16, 21–17 | (gold) Winner |

Mixed doubles
| Year | Tournament | Partner | Opponent | Score | Result |
|---|---|---|---|---|---|
| 2017 | Yonex / K&D Graphics International | (Canada) Josephine Wu | (United States) Sattawat Pongnairat (United States) Kuei-Ya Chen | 21–19, 21–15 | (gold) Winner |
| 2017 | Jamaica International | (Canada) Rachel Honderich | (Jamaica) Dennis Coke (Jamaica) Katherine Wynter | 21–9, 21–8 | (gold) Winner |
| 2016 | Brazil International | (Canada) Alex Bruce | (Austria) David Obernosterer (Austria) Elisabeth Baldauf | 21–12, 21–15 | (gold) Winner |
| 2013 | USA International | (Canada) Michelle Li | (United States) Halim Haryanto Ho (United States) Jing Yu Hong | 21–16, 21–15 | (gold) Winner |
| 2013 | Canadian International | (Canada) Alex Bruce | (England) Nathan Robertson (England) Jenny Wallwork | 9–21, 12–21 | (silver) Runner-up |
| 2013 | Peru International | (Canada) Grace Gao | (United States) Phillip Chew (United States) Jamie Subandhi | 21–12, 23–25, 21–17 | (gold) Winner |
| 2012 | Peru International | (Canada) Grace Gao | (Canada) Derrick Ng (Canada) Alex Bruce | 21–10, 21–15 | (gold) Winner |
| 2011 | Canadian International | (Canada) Grace Gao | (Canada) Derrick Ng (Canada) Alex Bruce | 21–15, 21–19 | (gold) Winner |
| 2011 | Puerto Rico International | (Canada) Grace Gao | (Canada) Adrian Liu (Canada) Joycelin Ko | 21–15, 24–22 | (gold) Winner |
| 2011 | Guatemala International | (Canada) Grace Gao | (Canada) Derrick Ng (Canada) Alex Bruce | 22–20, 21–14 | (gold) Winner |
| 2011 | Maldives International | (Canada) Grace Gao | (India) Arun Vishnu (India) Aparna Balan | 10–21, 21–12, 21–9 | (gold) Winner |
| 2011 | Morocco International | (Canada) Grace Gao | (Germany) Michael Fuchs (Germany) Birgit Michels | 15–21, 16–21 | (silver) Runner-up |
| 2011 | Peru International | (Canada) Grace Gao | (United States) Halim Ho (United States) Eva Lee | 21–11, 14–21, 21–15 | (gold) Winner |
| 2010 | Santo Domingo Open | (Canada) Grace Gao | (Canada) Adrian Liu (Canada) Joycelin Ko | 20–22, 21–14, 21–10 | (gold) Winner |
| 2010 | Guatemala International | (Canada) Grace Gao | (United States) Phillip Chew (United States) Cee Nantana Ketpura | 21–11, 21–12 | (gold) Winner |
| 2010 | Canadian International | (Canada) Grace Gao | (Canada) Derrick Ng (Canada) Jiang Xuelian | 21–23, 21–18, 26–24 | (gold) Winner |
| 2010 | Peru International | (Canada) Grace Gao | (Canada) Derrick Ng (Canada) Phyllis Chan | 11–21, 21–19, 22–20 | (gold) Winner |

BWF International Challenge tournament
BWF International Series tournament
