= Tahiti International =

The Tahiti International is an international badminton tournament held in Tahiti, French Polynesia organised by Tahiti Badminton Federation, sanctioned by Badminton World Federation (BWF) and Badminton Oceania. In the last few years, this tournament has been an BWF International Challenge with total prize money US$17.500. In fact, this tournament established since 2009, but not yet sanctioned by the Badminton World Federation.

This tournament held at the University of French Polynesia sports hall in Punaauia. The opening ceremony of this event displayed the Tahitian culture with music and dance.

== Previous winners ==
Year	Men's singles	Women's singles	Men's doubles	Women's doubles	Mixed doubles	Notes
2009	(France) Arnaud Genin	(New Caledonia) Johanna Kou	(Scotland) Alistair Casey (New Zealand) Brent Kevin Miller	No competition	(United States) Nicholas Jinadasa (United States) Victoria Liu	Tahiti International
2010	(Scotland) Alistair Casey	(United States) Cee Nantana Ketpura	(Australia) Ross Smith (Australia) Glenn Warfe	(Australia) Leanne Choo (Australia) Kate Wilson-Smith	(Australia) Ross Smith (Australia) Kate Wilson-Smith	Tahiti International; BWF International Series
2012	(Malaysia) Tan Chun Seang	(Canada) Michelle Li	(Canada) Adrian Liu (Canada) Derrick Ng	(United States) Eva Lee (United States) Paula Lynn Obañana	(Australia) Ross Smith (Australia) Renuga Veeran	Air Tahiti Nui International; BWF International Challenge
2013	(France) Brice Leverdez	(Thailand) Salakjit Ponsana	(Netherlands) Ruud Bosch (Netherlands) Koen Ridder	(Canada) Nicole Grether (Canada) Charmaine Reid	(Netherlands) Ruud Bosch (Thailand) Salakjit Ponsana	Air Tahiti Nui International; BWF International Challenge
2016	(Italy) Indra Bagus Ade Chandra	(Japan) Moe Araki	(Poland) Adam Cwalina (Poland) Przemysław Wacha	(Japan) Akane Araki (Japan) Ayaka Kawasaki	(Russia) Vitalij Durkin (Russia) Nina Vislova	Tahiti Phone International; BWF International Challenge

== Performances by nation ==
Pos	Nation	MS	WS	MD	WD	XD	Total
1	Australia	0	0	1	1	2	4
2	United States	0	1	0	1	1	3
2	Canada	0	1	1	1	0	3
4	France	2	0	0	0	0	2
4	Japan	0	1	0	1	0	2
6	Netherlands	0	0	1	0	0.5	1.5
6	Scotland	1	0	0.5	0	0	1.5
6	Thailand	0	1	0	0	0.5	1.5
9	Italy	1	0	0	0	0	1
9	Malaysia	1	0	0	0	0	1
9	New Caledonia	0	1	0	0	0	1
9	Poland	0	0	1	0	0	1
9	Russia	0	0	0	0	1	1
14	New Zealand	0	0	0.5	0	0	0.5
Total		5	5	5	4	5	24
