= Cee Nantana Ketpura =

American badminton player

Personal information
- Born: 13 October 1993 (age 32) Bangkok, Thailand
- Height: 5 ft 3 in (160 cm)

Sport
- Country: United States
- Sport: Badminton

Women's singles
- Career record: 42 wins, 24 losses
- Highest ranking: 44 (August 11, 2011)
Medal record
Badminton
Representing United States
Pan American Championships
Gold medal – first place	2010 Curitiba	Women's singles
Bronze medal – third place	2010 Curitiba	Mixed doubles

Cee Nantana Ketpura (born 15 October 1993) is a former American badminton player who competed in international elite events. She was a 2010 Pan American women's singles champion and a bronze medalist in the mixed doubles with Sattawat Pongnairat.
