= Rena Wang =

American badminton player (born 1991)

Rena Wang (born August 15, 1991) is an American badminton player. She was invited by the Badminton World Federation to compete at the 2012 Olympics in the women's singles event. Her sister, Iris Wang, is also a badminton player and her doubles partner. Rena Wang won bronze in the women's singles and women's doubles events with her sister at the 2009 Pan Am Badminton Championships at Guadalajara, Mexico.

== School life ==
Rena Wang graduated from UCLA in 2014, with summa cum laude honors in the physiological sciences department.
