= Joycelyn Ko =

Canadian badminton player

Joycelyn Ko 高福颐
Personal information
- Born: January 10, 1986 (age 40) Scarborough, Ontario, Canada
- Height: 168 cm (5 ft 6 in)
- Weight: 55 kg (121 lb)

Sport
- Country: Canada
- Sport: Badminton

Women's doubles
- Career record: 47 wins, 46 losses
- Highest ranking: 148 (10 October 2012)
Medal record
Badminton
Representing Canada
Pan American Games
Silver medal – second place	2011 Guadalajara	Women's singles
Bronze medal – third place	2011 Guadalajara	Women's doubles
Pan Am Championships
Gold medal – first place	2010 Curitiba	Women's doubles
Silver medal – second place	2009 Guadalajara	Women's singles
Silver medal – second place	2009 Guadalajara	Mixed doubles
Silver medal – second place	2012 Lima	Women's doubles
Bronze medal – third place	2008 Lima	Women's singles
Bronze medal – third place	2010 Curitiba	Mixed doubles

Joycelyn Ko (born January 10, 1986) is a former Canadian badminton player who competed in singles and doubles events at international level events.

Her highest achievement is winning silver and bronze medals at the 2011 Pan American Games. She also represented her country at the BWF World Championships in 2010 and 2014 reaching the round of 32 at the 2010 BWF World Championships and has also participated at the 2010 Commonwealth Games.
