= Grace Gao (badminton) =

Chinese-born Canadian badminton player (born 1989)

Grace Gao 高博
Personal information
- Full name: Grace Gao Bo
- Born: October 17, 1989 (age 36) Beijing, China

Sport
- Country: Canada
- Sport: Badminton
Medal record
Women's badminton
Representing Canada
Pan American Games
Gold medal – first place	2011 Guadalajara	Mixed doubles
Bronze medal – third place	2011 Guadalajara	Doubles

Grace Gao (Chinese: 高博; pinyin: Gāo Bó, born October 17, 1989) is a Chinese-born Canadian female badminton player from Calgary, Alberta. She began playing the sport in her hometown Beijing, and became a naturalized citizen of Canada in 2009, after immigrating with her parents at age 14. She competed at the 2012 Summer Olympics in the Mixed doubles event with partner Toby Ng.
