= Mathew Fogarty =

American badminton player (born 1956)

Personal information
- Born: October 30, 1956 (age 70)
- Height: 6 ft 3 in (1.90 m)

Sport
- Country: United States
- Sport: Badminton

Men's
- Highest ranking: 168 (MS) November 5, 2011; 72 (XD) June 25, 2018
- Current ranking: 595 (MS) June 25, 2018; 72 (XD) June 25, 2018
- BWF profile
Medal record
Badminton
Representing United States
Pan Am Championships
Bronze medal – third place	2014 Markham	Men's doubles
Bronze medal – third place	2009 Guadalajara	Men's doubles
Bronze medal – third place	2008 Lima	Mixed team

Mathew Fogarty (born October 30, 1956) is an American male badminton player who has specialized in doubles events. He has shared the men's double title in four U.S. National Badminton Championships (1980, 1984, 1986, 2000) with three different partners. In 1985, Partnering with Bruce Pontow from Chicago Illinois, coming out of retirement after 2 years, Pontow and Fogarty established the greatest “Underdog” defeat in Men's Doubles history defeating Korean All-England Champions Kim Moon-soo and Lee Deuk-choon in Thomas Cup held in Vancouver, Canada after the Men's Team with Legendary coach and player Park Joo-bong challenged into and winning the Pan American Zone. The victory by far the best an Unranked pair competed against the best in the world during the era from 1985 until 1991 Korea Dominated World Badminton by winning many of the All-England doubles events (Women's, Men's and Mixed Doubles) with 16 wins to Korea, 4 to China, and 1 win to Nora Perry from England and Billy Gilliland from Scotland. In 2008, he won the bronze medal at the Pan Am Badminton Championships in the mixed team event. He also won the men's doubles bronze medal in 2009 and 2014. In 2015, at age 58, Fogarty became the oldest shuttler competing at the BWF World Championships at the Istora Senayan Indoor Stadium, Jakarta. He has been qualified for the BWF World Championships seven times. He practiced six days a week after work to maintain his fitness. Fogarty works as a Physician by practice in the US Navy.

== Achievements ==
=== Pan Am Championships ===
Men's Doubles
Year	Venue	Partner	Opponent	Score	Result
2014	Markham Pan Am Centre; Markham, Canada	(United States) Bjorn Seguin	(Canada) Adrian Liu (Canada) Derrick Ng	11-21, 10-21	Bronze
2009	Coliseo Olímpico de la Universidad de Guadalajara; Guadalajara, Mexico	(United States) David Neumann	(Peru) Antonio de Vinatea (Peru) Martin Del Valle	21-18, 14-21, 16-21	Bronze

=== BWF International Challenge/Series ===
Men's Doubles
Year	Tournament	Partner	Opponent	Score	Result
2016	Manhattan Beach International	(United States) Bjorn Seguin	(Indonesia) David Yedija Pohan (Indonesia) Ricky Alverino Sidarta	17-21, 14-21	(silver) Runner-up
2014	Puerto Rico International	(United States) Bjorn Seguin	(Italy) Giovanni Greco (Italy) Rosario Maddaloni	13-21, 12-21	(silver) Runner-up
2011	Colombia International	(United States) Nicholas Jinadasa	(Brazil) Lucas Alves (Peru) Andrés Corpancho	21-13, 15-21, 21-17	(gold) Winner
2010	Colombia International	(Scotland) Alistair Casey	(Peru) Pablo Aguilar (Peru) Bruno Monteverde	11-21, 21-18, 19-21	(silver) Runner-up
2009	Guatemala International	(United States) David Neumann	(Guatemala) Kevin Cordón (Guatemala) Rodolfo Ramírez	16-21, 14-21	(silver) Runner-up
2009	Mexican International	(United States) David Neumann	(Mexico) José Luis Gonzalez (Mexico) Andrés López	18-21, 21-16, 14-21	(silver) Runner-up
2009	Colombia International	(United States) David Neumann	(Ecuador) Santiago Zambrano (Ecuador) Sebastian Teran	21-9, 17-21, 21-14	(gold) Winner
2007	Puerto Rico International	(United States) Dean Schoppe	(Brazil) Kumasaka Guilherme (Brazil) Pardo Guilherme	10-21, 15-21	(silver) Runner-up
2000	Brazil São Paulo International	(United States) Dean Schoppe	(Mexico) Luis Lopezllera (Mexico) Bernardo Monreal	15-9, 15-10	(gold) Winner
2000	Pan American Classic	(United States) Kevin Han	(United States) Andy Chong (United States) Henrik Wiberg	15-8, 15-4	(gold) Winner
1998	Suriname International	(United States) Dean Schoppe	(Canada) Brent Olynyk (Canada) Iain Sydie	3-15, 2-15	(silver) Runner-up
1998	Miami International	(United States) Andy Chong	(United States) Howard Bach (United States) Kevin Han	5-15, 12-15	(silver) Runner-up
1998	Brazil São Paulo International	(United States) Dean Schoppe	(Brazil) Guilherme Kumasaka (Brazil) Paulo von Scala	10-15, 15-8, 15-11	(gold) Winner

Mixed Doubles
Year	Tournament	Partner	Opponent	Score	Result
2002	Brazil São Paulo International	(United States) Lina Taft	(Peru) Rodrigo Pacheco (Peru) Lorena Blanco	3-11, 1-11	(silver) Runner-up
2000	Pan American Classic	(United States) Lina Taft	(United States) Andy Chong (United States) Kokoe Tanak	2-15, 14-17	(silver) Runner-up

BWF International Challenge tournament
BWF International Series tournament
BWF Future Series tournament
