= Rodrigo Pacheco (badminton) =

Peruvian badminton player (born 1983)

Personal information
- Born: Rodrigo Daniel Pacheco Carrillo; 14 January 1983 (age 43) Lima, Peru
- Height: 1.80 m (5 ft 11 in)
- Weight: 73 kg (161 lb)

Sport
- Country: Peru
- Sport: Badminton

Men's singles & doubles
- Highest ranking: 58 (MS 25 August 2011); 118 (MD 22 September 2011); 53 (XD 21 April 2011)
- BWF profile
Medal record
Men's badminton
Representing Peru
Pan American Games
Bronze medal – third place	2007 Rio de Janeiro	Men's singles
Bronze medal – third place	2007 Rio de Janeiro	Mixed doubles
Bronze medal – third place	2011 Guadalajara	Mixed doubles
Pan Am Championships
Silver medal – second place	2009 Guadalajara	Mixed team
Silver medal – second place	2010 Curitiba	Men's singles
Bronze medal – third place	2010 Curitiba	Men's doubles
Bronze medal – third place	2010 Curitiba	Mixed team
South American Games
Gold medal – first place	2010 Medellín	Men's doubles
Gold medal – first place	2010 Medellín	Mixed doubles
Gold medal – first place	2010 Medellín	Mixed team

Rodrigo Daniel Pacheco Carrillo (born 14 January 1983) is a Peruvian badminton player. Pacheco started playing badminton when he was 6 years old at the club Regatas Lima. He had made his debut at the Pan Am Junior Championships in 1996, and became the senior national team member in 2001. He was the bronze medalists at the Pan American Games, in the men's singles event in 2007, and also in the mixed doubles event in 2007 and 2011. In 2010, he won triple gold medals at the South American Games in the men's doubles, mixed doubles, and mixed team event. He competed for Peru at the 2012 Summer Olympics. Pacheco educated Sports management at the University College of Northern Denmark.

== Achievements ==
=== Pan American Games ===
Men's singles
Year	Venue	Opponent	Score	Result
2007	Riocentro Sports Complex; Rio de Janeiro, Brazil	(Canada) Mike Beres	21–17, 13–21, 19–21	Bronze

Mixed doubles
Year	Venue	Partner	Opponent	Score	Result
2007	Riocentro Sports Complex; Rio de Janeiro, Brazil	(Peru) Claudia Rivero	(United States) Howard Bach (United States) Eva Lee	13–21, 13–21	Bronze
2011	Multipurpose Gymnasium; Guadalajara, Mexico	(Peru) Claudia Rivero	(United States) Halim Ho (United States) Eva Lee	13–21, 19–21	Bronze

=== Pan Am Championships ===
Men's singles
Year	Venue	Opponent	Score	Result
2010	Clube Curitibano; Curitiba, Brazil	(Canada) Stephan Wojcikiewicz	21–15, 7–21, 13–21	Silver

Men's doubles
Year	Venue	Partner	Opponent	Score	Result
2010	Clube Curitibano; Curitiba, Brazil	(Peru) Bruno Monteverde	(Brazil) Hugo Arthuso (Brazil) Daniel Paiola	23–25, 19–21	Bronze

=== South American Games ===
Men's doubles
Year	Venue	Partner	Opponent	Score	Result
2010	Centro de Convenciones Plaza Mayor; Medellín, Colombia	(Peru) Antonio de Vinatea	(Brazil) Daniel Paiola (Brazil) Alex Tjong	21–14, 21–19	Gold

Mixed doubles
Year	Venue	Partner	Opponent	Score	Result
2010	Centro de Convenciones Plaza Mayor; Medellín, Colombia	(Peru) Claudia Rivero	(Brazil) Alex Tjong (Brazil) Yasmin Cury	21–15, 21–15	Gold

=== BWF International Challenge/Series ===
Men's singles
Year	Tournament	Opponent	Score	Result
2010	Colombia International	(Brazil) Hugo Arthuso	21–14, 21–14	(gold) Winner
2011	Kenya International	(Russia) Vladimir Malkov	22–20, 23–25, 11–21	(silver) Runner-up
2011	Miami International	(Sri Lanka) Niluka Karunaratne	12–21, 14–21	(silver) Runner-up
2011	Internacional Mexicano	(Scotland) Alistair Casey	21–19, 21–13	(gold) Winner

Men's doubles
Year	Tournament	Partner	Opponent	Score	Result
2002	Peru International	(Peru) Guillermo Perea	(United States) Mike Chansawangpuvana (United States) Eric Go	4–7, 4–7, 0–7	(silver) Runner-up
2004	Peru International	(Peru) Guillermo Perea	(United States) Howard Bach (United States) Kevin Han	7–15, 11–15	(silver) Runner-up
2006	Peru International	(Peru) Javier Jimeno	(Indonesia) Sartono Ekopranoto (Indonesia) Roy Purnomo		(silver) Runner-up
2008	Peru International	(Peru) Andrés Corpancho	(Peru) Francisco Ugaz (Spain) José Antonio Crespo	15–21, 15–21	(silver) Runner-up

Mixed doubles
Year	Tournament	Partner	Opponent	Score	Result
2002	Peru International	(Peru) Lorena Blanco	(Netherlands) Tjitte Weistra (Peru) Doriana Rivera	2–7, 7–8, 2–7	(silver) Runner-up
2002	Brazil International	(Peru) Lorena Blanco	(United States) Mathew Fogarty (United States) Lina Taft	11–3, 11–1	(gold) Winner
2007	Peru International	(Peru) Claudia Rivero	(Canada) Mike Beres (Canada) Valerie Loker	11–21, 14–21	(silver) Runner-up
2010	Colombia International	(Peru) Claudia Rivero	(Peru) Mario Cuba (Peru) Katherine Winder	1–0 retired	(gold) Winner

BWF International Challenge tournament
BWF International Series tournament
BWF Future Series tournament
