= Claudia Zornoza (badminton) =

Peruvian badminton player (born 1990)

Personal information
- Born: Claudia Zornoza Roca-Rey; 12 February 1990 (age 36) Lima, Peru

Sport
- Country: Peru
- Sport: Badminton

Women's
- Highest ranking: 41 (WD) (7 October 2010)
- BWF profile
Medal record
Badminton
Representing Peru
Pan Am Championships
Silver medal – second place	2009 Guadalajara	Mixed team
Bronze medal – third place	2010 Curitiba	Mixed team
Bronze medal – third place	2008 Lima	Women's doubles
South American Games
Gold medal – first place	2010 Medellín	Women's doubles
Gold medal – first place	2010 Medellín	Mixed team
Pan Am Junior Championships
Gold medal – first place	2008 Guatemala City	Mixed team
Silver medal – second place	2008 Guatemala City	Girls' doubles
Silver medal – second place	2007 Puerto Vallarta	Mixed team
Bronze medal – third place	2008 Guatemala City	Girls' singles
Bronze medal – third place	2007 Puerto Vallarta	Girls' doubles

Claudia Zornoza Roca-Rey (born 12 February 1990) is a Peruvian female badminton player. She came into international badminton arena after claiming gold medal in the women's doubles partnering with Katherine Winder at the 2008 Puerto Rico International. She also clinched the gold medal in the mixed doubles at the 2009 Puerto Rico International partnering with Bruno Monteverde.

Claudia went onto participate at the 2010 South American Games, claimed gold medals in the women's doubles along with Katherine Winder and in the mixed team event. Claudia Zornoza graduated at the Colegio Santa Ürsula in 2006.

== Achievements ==
=== Pan Am Championships ===
Women's doubles
Year	Venue	Partner	Opponent	Score	Result
2008	Club de Regatas; Lima, Peru	(Peru) Katherine Winder	(Canada) Fiona McKee (Canada) Valerie Loker	11–21, 11–21	Bronze

=== South American Games ===
Women's doubles
Year	Venue	Partner	Opponent	Score	Result
2010	Medellín, Colombia	(Peru) Katherine Winder	(Peru) Cristina Aicardi (Peru) Claudia Rivero	10–21, 21–18, 24–22	Gold

=== Pan Am Junior Championships ===
Girls' singles
Year	Venue	Opponent	Score	Result
2008	Guatemala City, Guatemala	(Canada) Katelin Dejak	21–18, 16–21, 17–21	Bronze

Girls' doubles
Year	Venue	Partner	Opponent	Score	Result
2008	Guatemala City, Guatemala	(Peru) Katherine Winder	(United States) Priscilla Lun (United States) Rena Wang	17–21, 16–21	Silver
2007	Puerto Vallarta, Mexico	(Peru) Katherine Winder	(Canada) Chelcia Petersen (Canada) Grace Gao	15–21, 22–24	Bronze

=== BWF International Challenge/Series ===
Women's doubles
Year	Tournament	Partner	Opponent	Score	Result
2010	Colombia International	(Peru) Katherine Winder	(Peru) Christina Aicardi (Peru) Claudia Rivero	21–17, 22–24, 15–21	(silver) Runner-up
2009	Puerto Rico International	(Peru) Katherine Winder	(Peru) Christina Aicardi (Peru) Claudia Rivero	10–21, 22–24	(silver) Runner-up
2009	Santo Domingo Open	(Peru) Katherine Winder	(Peru) Christina Aicardi (Peru) Claudia Rivero	15–21, 16–21	(silver) Runner-up
2009	Brazil International	(Peru) Katherine Winder	(Peru) Christina Aicardi (Peru) Alejandra Monteverde	20–22, 21–23	(silver) Runner-up
2009	Giraldilla International	(Peru) Katherine Winder	(Cuba) Solangel Guzman (Cuba) Lisandra Suarez	14–21, 24–26	(silver) Runner-up
2008	Puerto Rico International	(Peru) Katherine Winder	(Peru) Christina Aicardi (Peru) Alejandra Monteverde	21–11, 16–21, 21–16	(gold) Winner
2008	Brazil International	(Peru) Katherine Winder	(Peru) Christina Aicardi (Peru) Alejandra Monteverde	21–23, 17–21	(silver) Runner-up

Mixed doubles
Year	Tournament	Partner	Opponent	Score	Result
2009	Puerto Rico International	(Peru) Bruno Monteverde	(Peru) Mario Cuba (Peru) Katherine Winder	21–17, 21–19	(gold) Winner
2009	Santo Domingo Open	(Peru) Bruno Monteverde	(Peru) Mario Cuba (Peru) Katherine Winder	14–21, 16–21	(silver) Runner-up
2008	Brazil International	(Peru) Bruno Monteverde	(Brazil) Lucas Araújo (Brazil) Roberta Angi	21–16, 21–16	(gold) Winner

BWF International Challenge tournament
BWF International Series tournament
BWF Future Series tournament
