= Daniel Paiola =

Brazilian badminton player (born 1989)

Personal information
- Born: Daniel Vasconcellos Paiola; 4 May 1989 (age 37) Campinas, Brazil
- Height: 1.81 m (5 ft 11 in)

Sport
- Country: Brazil
- Sport: Badminton
- Handedness: Right

Men's singles
- Highest ranking: 62 (11 June 2015)
- Current ranking: 113 (10 May 2012)
- BWF profile
Medal record
Men's Badminton
Representing Brazil
Pan American Games
Silver medal – second place	2015 Toronto	Men's doubles
Bronze medal – third place	2011 Guadalajara	Men's singles
Pan American Championships
Silver medal – second place	2016 Campinas	Mixed team
Silver medal – second place	2012 Lima	Mixed doubles
Bronze medal – third place	2014 Markham	Men's singles
Bronze medal – third place	2014 Markham	Mixed team
Bronze medal – third place	2013 Santo Domingo	Men's singles
Bronze medal – third place	2013 Santo Domingo	Mixed doubles
Bronze medal – third place	2013 Santo Domingo	Mixed team
Bronze medal – third place	2012 Lima	Men's singles
Bronze medal – third place	2012 Lima	Mixed team
South American Games
Gold medal – first place	2010 Medellín	Men's singles
Silver medal – second place	2010 Medellín	Men's doubles
Silver medal – second place	2010 Medellín	Mixed team

Daniel Vasconcellos Paiola (born 4 May 1989) is a Brazilian badminton player. He became the first Brazilian badminton player to win an individual medal in the Pan American Games when he won a bronze in the men's singles event at the 2011 Games, losing in the semi-finals to Guatemalan Kevin Cordón. He has medaled ten at the Pan American Badminton Championships, and is a one-time national champion.

== Early life ==
Paiola was born in Campinas, and his father died when he was one year old. He started out playing tennis, but took up badminton at age 13 after a shoulder injury took him out for year. While still a teenager, his mother sent him to train in Portugal with Marco Vasconcelos, a fifteen-time Portuguese national champion, and his training also took him to Spain, Denmark and Malaysia. His first international tournament was the 2007 Pan Am Junior Badminton Championships, where he competed in the under-19 boys' singles and mixed doubles events.

== Professional career ==
Paiola made his professional international debut at the 2008 South Africa International in Cape Town, where he won a gold medal in the men's singles category.

In August 2011, Paiola competed at the 2011 BWF World Championships in London. He lost his first match to Kazushi Yamada of Japan (13-21, 9-21). He also competed in men's doubles with compatriot Hugo Arthuso. They lost in the first round to Chris Adcock and Andrew Ellis (10-21, 11-21).

He also competed at the 2014 BWF World Championships in Kuala Lumpur. In the men's singles tournament, he lost his first match against Austrian David Obernosterer (21-17, 11-21, 17-21). He also participated in mixed doubles, where he and Paula Pereira lost in the first round to the Austrian pairing of Roman Zirnwald and Elisabeth Baldauf (15-21, 17-21). The following August at the 2015 event, though, he avenged his loss to Obernosterer by beating him by the scores of 21-14, 11-21, 24-22. He subsequently lost his second-round match with Lin Dan (widely considered one of the greatest badminton players ever) with scores of 14-21, 14-21.

== Achievements ==
=== Pan American Games ===
Men's singles
Year	Venue	Opponent	Score	Result
2011	Multipurpose Gymnasium, Guadalajara, Mexico	(Guatemala) Kevin Cordón	14–21, 8–21	Bronze

Men's doubles
Year	Venue	Partner	Opponent	Score	Result
2015	Atos Markham Pan Am Centre, Toronto, Canada	(Brazil) Hugo Arthuso	(United States) Phillip Chew (United States) Sattawat Pongnairat	18–21, 16–21	Silver

=== Pan Am Championships ===
Men's singles
Year	Venue	Opponent	Score	Result
2014	Markham Pan Am Centre; Markham, Canada	(United States) Bjorn Seguin	21–23, 15–21	Bronze
2013	Palacio de los Deportes Virgilio Travieso Soto; Santo Domingo, Dominican Republic	(United States) Sattawat Pongnairat	19–21, 18–21	Bronze
2012	Manuel Bonilla Stadium; Lima, Peru	(Cuba) Osleni Guerrero	11–21, 16–21	Bronze

Men's doubles
Year	Venue	Partner	Opponent	Score	Result
2012	Manuel Bonilla Stadium; Lima, Peru	(Brazil) Alex Yuwan Tjong	(Canada) Adrian Liu (Canada) Derrick Ng	9–21, 9–21	Silver
2010	Clube Curitibano; Curitiba, Brazil	(Brazil) Hugo Arthuso	(United States) Sameera Gunatileka (United States) Vincent Nguy	19–21, 21–19, 17–21	Silver

Mixed doubles
Year	Venue	Partner	Opponent	Score	Result
2013	Palacio de los Deportes Virgilio Travieso Soto; Santo Domingo, Dominican Republic	(Brazil) Paula Pereira	(United States) Howard Shu (United States) Eva Lee	8–21, 12–21	Bronze

=== South American Games ===
Men's singles
Year	Venue	Opponent	Score	Result
2010	Medellín, Colombia	(Brazil) Hugo Arthuso	13–21, 21–18, 24–22	Gold

Men's doubles
Year	Venue	Partner	Opponent	Score	Result
2010	Medellín, Colombia	(Brazil) Alex Yuwan Tjong	(Peru) Antonio de Vinatea (Peru) Rodrigo Pacheco	14–21, 19–21	Silver

=== BWF International Challenge/Series ===
Men's singles
Year	Tournament	Opponent	Score	Result
2015	Colombia International	(United States) Bjorn Seguin	18–21, 18–21	(silver) Runner-up
2015	Peru International Series	(Guatemala) Kevin Cordón	16–21, 20–22	(silver) Runner-up
2014	Venezuela International	(Cuba) Osleni Guerrero	13–21, 8–21	(silver) Runner-up
2014	Argentina International	(Guatemala) Kevin Cordón	12–21, 18–21	(silver) Runner-up
2014	Puerto Rico International	(France) Brice Leverdez	17–21, 14–21	(silver) Runner-up
2013	Internacional Mexicano	(Cuba) Osleni Guerrero	16–21, 17–21	(silver) Runner-up
2009	Suriname International	(Suriname) Virgil Soeroredjo	19–21, 13–21	(silver) Runner-up
2009	Colombia International	(Peru) Mario Cuba	21–19, 21–15	(gold) Winner
2008	South Africa International	(South Africa) Roelof Dednam	23–21, 18–21, 21–18	(gold) Winner

Men's doubles
Year	Tournament	Partner	Opponent	Score	Result
2015	Brazil International	(Brazil) Hugo Arthuso	(Mexico) Job Castillo (Mexico) Lino Munoz	18–21, 14–21	(silver) Runner-up
2015	Colombia International	(Brazil) Alex Yuwan Tjong	(Italy) Giovanni Greco (Italy) Rosario Maddaloni	21–16, 21–17	(gold) Winner
2015	Internacional Mexicano	(Brazil) Hugo Arthuso	(Mexico) Job Castillo (Mexico) Lino Munoz	21–13, 12–21, 20–22	(silver) Runner-up
2015	Peru International Series	(Brazil) Hugo Arthuso	(Turkey) Emre Vural (Turkey) Sİnan Zorlu	14–21, 21–17, 19–21	(silver) Runner-up
2014	Venezuela International	(Brazil) Hugo Arthuso	(Brazil) Fabio Soares (Brazil) Alex Yuwan Tjong	16–21, 21–18, 21–14	(gold) Winner
2014	Argentina International	(Brazil) Hugo Arthuso	(Guatemala) Jonathan Solis (Guatemala) Rodolfo Ramirez	15–21, 18–21	(silver) Runner-up
2011	Canadian International	(Brazil) Hugo Arthuso	(Canada) Adrian Liu (Canada) Derrick Ng	7–21, 15–21	(silver) Runner-up
2011	Miami International	(Brazil) Hugo Arthuso	(United States) Phillip Chew (United States) Sattawat Pongnairat	21–16, 18–21, 21–9	(gold) Winner

Mixed doubles
Year	Tournament	Partner	Opponent	Score	Result
2015	Puerto Rico International	(Brazil) Fabiana Silva	(Brazil) Alex Yuwan Tjong (Brazil) Lohaynny Vicente	12–21, 21–18, 23–25	(silver) Runner-up
2013	Internacional Mexicano	(Brazil) Paula Pereira	(Brazil) Hugo Arthuso (Brazil) Fabiana Silva	13–21, 21–13, 21–19	(gold) Winner

BWF International Challenge tournament
BWF International Series tournament
BWF Future Series tournament
