= Hugo Arthuso =

Brazilian badminton player (born 1987)

Personal information
- Born: Hugo Lemos Arthuso; 22 May 1987 (age 39) Osasco, São Paulo
- Height: 1.78 m (5 ft 10 in)
- Weight: 85 kg (187 lb)

Sport
- Country: Brazil
- Sport: Badminton
- Coached by: Right

Men's
- Highest ranking: 120 (MS) 14 October 2010; 43 (MD) 10 May 2012; 51 (XD) 25 September 2014
- BWF profile
Medal record
Men's badminton
Representing Brazil
Pan American Games
Silver medal – second place	2015 Toronto	Men's doubles
Pan American Championships
Silver medal – second place	2017 Santo Domingo	Mixed team
Silver medal – second place	2016 Campinas	Mixed team
Silver medal – second place	2010 Curitiba	Men's doubles
Bronze medal – third place	2014 Markham	Mixed team
Bronze medal – third place	2013 Santo Domingo	Mixed doubles
Bronze medal – third place	2013 Santo Domingo	Mixed team
Bronze medal – third place	2008 Lima	Mixed doubles
South American Games
Silver medal – second place	2010 Medellín	Men's singles
Silver medal – second place	2010 Medellín	Mixed team
Bronze medal – third place	2010 Medellín	Mixed doubles

Hugo Lemos Arthuso (born 4 May 1987) is a Brazilian male badminton player. He competed at the Pan American Games in 2011 and 2015.

== Career ==
In 2011, he became the champion at the Bill Graham Miami International tournament in men's doubles event with Daniel Paiola. He also won the Suriname International tournament in mixed doubles event partnered with Fabiana Silva. In 2015, he won the silver medal in men's doubles event at the Toronto Pan American Games partnered with Daniel Paiola.

== Achievements ==
=== Pan American Games ===
Men's Doubles
Year	Venue	Partner	Opponent	Score	Result
2015	Atos Markham Pan Am Centre, Toronto, Canada	(Brazil) Daniel Paiola	(United States) Phillip Chew (United States) Sattawat Pongnairat	18-21, 16-21	Silver

=== Pan Am Championships ===
Men's Doubles
Year	Venue	Partner	Opponent	Score	Result
2010	Clube Curitibano; Curitiba, Brazil	(Brazil) Daniel Paiola	(United States) Sameera Gunatileka (United States) Vincent Nguy	19-21, 21-19, 17-21	Silver

Mixed Doubles
Year	Venue	Partner	Opponent	Score	Result
2013	Palacio de los Deportes Virgilio Travieso Soto; Santo Domingo, Dominican Republic	(Brazil) Fabiana Silva	(Canada) Toby Ng (Canada) Alexandra Bruce	9-21, 14-21	Bronze
2008	Club de Regatas; Lima, Peru	(Brazil) Marina Eliezer	(Canada) William Milroy (Canada) Fiona McKee	11-21, 14-21	Bronze

=== South American Games ===
Men's Singles
Year	Venue	Opponent	Score	Result
2010	Medellín, Colombia	(Brazil) Daniel Paiola	21-13, 18-21, 22-24	Silver

Mixed Doubles
Year	Venue	Partner	Opponent	Score	Result
2010	Medellín, Colombia	(Brazil) Marina Eliezer	(Peru) Rodrigo Pacheco (Peru) Claudia Rivero	15-21, 9-21	Bronze

=== BWF International Challenge/Series ===
Men's Doubles
Year	Tournament	Partner	Opponent	Score	Result
2015	Brazil International	(Brazil) Daniel Paiola	(Mexico) Job Castillo (Mexico) Lino Munoz	18-21, 14-21	(silver) Runner-up
2015	Internacional Mexicano	(Brazil) Daniel Paiola	(Mexico) Job Castillo (Mexico) Lino Munoz	21-13, 12-21, 20-22	(silver) Runner-up
2015	Peru International Series	(Brazil) Daniel Paiola	(Turkey) Emre Vural (Turkey) Sİnan Zorlu	14-21, 21-17, 19-21	(silver) Runner-up
2014	Venezuela International	(Brazil) Daniel Paiola	(Brazil) Fabio da Silva Soares (Brazil) Alex Tjong	16-21, 21-18, 21-14	(gold) Winner
2014	Argentina International	(Brazil) Daniel Paiola	(Guatemala) Jonathan Solis (Guatemala) Rodolfo Ramirez	15-21, 18-21	(silver) Runner-up
2013	Santo Domingo Open	(Brazil) Alex Tjong	(Jamaica) Gareth Henry (Jamaica) Samuel Ricketts	21-19, 16-21, 15-21	(silver) Runner-up
2013	Brazil International	(Brazil) Alex Tjong	(United States) Phillip Chew (United States) Sattawat Pongnairat	21-12, 13-21, 15-21	(silver) Runner-up
2013	Argentina International	(Brazil) Alex Tjong	(Peru) Andres Corpancho (Peru) Gonzalo Duany	21-18, 21-19	(gold) Winner
2013	Mercosul International	(Brazil) Alex Tjong	(Czech Republic) Jan Frohlich (Czech Republic) Svata Zdenek	22-20, 21-15	(gold) Winner
2011	Canadian International	(Brazil) Daniel Paiola	(Canada) Adrian Liu (Canada) Derrick Ng	7-21, 15-21	(silver) Runner-up
2011	Miami International	(Brazil) Daniel Paiola	(United States) Phillip Chew (United States) Sattawat Pongnairat	21-16, 18-21, 21-9	(gold) Winner

Mixed Doubles
Year	Tournament	Partner	Opponent	Score	Result
2017	Brazil International	(Brazil) Fabiana Silva	(Germany) Jonathan Persson (Mauritius) Kate Foo Kune	21-11, 21-19	(gold) Winner
2015	Brazil International	(Brazil) Fabiana Silva	(Austria) David Obernosterer (Austria) Elisabeth Baldauf	21–15, 16–21, 21–19	(gold) Winner
2014	Argentina International	(Brazil) Fabiana Silva	(Brazil) Alex Tjong (Brazil) Lohaynny Vicente	19-21, 19–21	(silver) Runner-up
2014	Mercosul International	(Brazil) Fabiana Silva	(Denmark) Soeren Toft Hansen (United States) Bo Rong	21-23, 13-21	(silver) Runner-up
2013	Internacional Mexicano	(Brazil) Fabiana Silva	(Brazil) Daniel Paiola (Brazil) Paula Pereira	21-13, 13-21, 19-21	(silver) Runner-up
2013	Santo Domingo Open	(Brazil) Fabiana Silva	(Brazil) Alex Tjong (Brazil) Lohaynny Vicente	9-21, 13-21	(silver) Runner-up
2013	Argentina International	(Brazil) Fabiana Silva	(Mexico) Lino Muñoz (Mexico) Cynthia Gonzalez	18-21, 21-9, 16-21	(silver) Runner-up
2013	Mercosul International	(Brazil) Fabiana Silva	(Mexico) Lino Muñoz (Mexico) Cynthia Gonzalez	16-21, 16-21	(silver) Runner-up
2012	Brazil International	(Brazil) Fabiana Silva	(United States) Phillip Chew (United States) Jamie Subandhi	19-21, 16-21	(silver) Runner-up
2011	Suriname International	(Brazil) Fabiana Silva	(Suriname) Mitchel Wongsodikromo (Suriname) Crystal Leefmans	22-20, 21-18	(gold) Winner

BWF International Challenge tournament
BWF International Series tournament
BWF Future Series tournament
