= Katherine Winder =

Peruvian badminton player

Personal information
- Born: Katherine Winder Cochella; 23 April 1992 (age 34)
- Height: 1.63 m (5 ft 4 in)
- Weight: 60 kg (132 lb)

Sport
- Country: Peru
- Sport: Badminton

Women's singles & doubles
- Highest ranking: 117 (WS 11 March 2010); 41 (WD 7 October 2010); 37 (XD 2 April 2015)
- BWF profile
Medal record
Women's badminton
Representing Peru
Pan Am Games
Bronze medal – third place	2015 Markham	Mixed doubles
Pan Am Championships
Silver medal – second place	2008 Lima	Mixed team
Bronze medal – third place	2008 Lima	Women's doubles
Bronze medal – third place	2014 Markham	Mixed doubles
Bronze medal – third place	2017 Havana	Mixed doubles
South American Games
Gold medal – first place	2010 Medellín	Women's doubles
Gold medal – first place	2010 Medellín	Mixed team

Katherine Winder Cochella (born 23 April 1992) is a Peruvian badminton player. She educated at the Universidad del Pacífico Lima, and in 2015, Winder competed at the Pan Am Games in the women's and mixed doubles event. In the women's doubles she placed 7th, while in the mixed doubles she won the bronze medal partnered with Mario Cuba. In 2010, she won the gold medal at the South American Games in the women's doubles event teamed up with Claudia Zornoza.

== Achievements ==
=== Pan American Games ===
Mixed doubles
Year	Venue	Partner	Opponent	Score	Result
2015	Atos Markham Pan Am Centre; Markham, Canada	(Peru) Mario Cuba	(United States) Phillip Chew (United States) Jamie Subandhi	18–21, 14–21	Bronze

=== Pan Am Championships ===
Women's doubles
Year	Venue	Partner	Opponent	Score	Result
2008	Club de Regatas; Lima, Peru	(Peru) Claudia Zornoza	(Canada) Valerie Loker (Canada) Fiona McKee	11–21, 11–21	Bronze

Mixed doubles
Year	Venue	Partner	Opponent	Score	Result
2014	Markham Pan Am Centre; Markham, Canada	(Peru) Mario Cuba	(United States) Phillip Chew (United States) Jamie Subandhi	9–21, 14–21	Bronze
2017	Sports City Coliseum; Havana, Cuba	(Peru) Mario Cuba	(Canada) Toby Ng (Canada) Rachel Honderich	13–21, 8–21	Bronze

=== South American Games ===
Women's doubles
Year	Venue	Partner	Opponent	Score	Result
2010	Plaza Mayor; Medellín, Colombia	(Peru) Claudia Zornoza	(Peru) Cristina Aicardi (Peru) Claudia Rivero	10–21, 21–18, 24–22	Gold

=== BWF International Challenge/Series ===
Women's singles
Year	Tournament	Opponent	Score	Result
2009	Colombia International	(Peru) Lorena Duany	21–10, 21–13	(gold) Winner

Women's doubles
Year	Tournament	Partner	Opponent	Score	Result
2008	Brazil International	(Peru) Claudia Zornoza	(Peru) Christina Aicardi (Peru) Alejandra Monteverde	21–23, 17–21	(silver) Runner-up
2008	Puerto Rico International	(Peru) Claudia Zornoza	(Peru) Christina Aicardi (Peru) Alejandra Monteverde	21–11, 16–21, 21–16	(gold) Winner
2009	Giraldilla International	(Peru) Claudia Zornoza	(Cuba) Solangel Guzman (Cuba) Lisandra Suarez	14–21, 24–26	(silver) Runner-up
2009	Brazil International	(Peru) Claudia Zornoza	(Peru) Christina Aicardi (Peru) Alejandra Monteverde	20–22, 21–23	(silver) Runner-up
2009	Santo Domingo Open	(Peru) Claudia Zornoza	(Peru) Christina Aicardi (Peru) Claudia Rivero	15–21, 16–21	(silver) Runner-up
2009	Puerto Rico International	(Peru) Claudia Zornoza	(Peru) Christina Aicardi (Peru) Claudia Rivero	10–21, 22–24	(silver) Runner-up
2010	Colombia International	(Peru) Claudia Zornoza	(Peru) Christina Aicardi (Peru) Claudia Rivero	21–17, 22–24, 15–21	(silver) Runner-up
2014	Chile International	(Peru) Luz María Zornoza	(Brazil) Ana Paula Campos (Peru) Camila Duany	11–2, 11–8, 11–3	(gold) Winner
2014	Colombia International	(Peru) Luz María Zornoza	(Peru) Daniela Macías (Peru) Dánica Nishimura	11–6, 11–10, 11–6	(gold) Winner
2014	Suriname International	(Peru) Luz María Zornoza	(Peru) Daniela Macías (Peru) Dánica Nishimura	21–13, 21–14	(gold) Winner
2015	Santo Domingo Open	(Peru) Luz María Zornoza	(Dominican Republic) Nairoby Abigail Jiménez (Dominican Republic) Licelott Sánchez	21–15, 21–6	(gold) Winner

Mixed doubles
Year	Tournament	Partner	Opponent	Score	Result
2008	Miami Pan Am International	(Peru) Martín del Valle	(Peru) Andrés Corpancho (Peru) Cristina Aicardi	14–21, 21–18, 16–21	(silver) Runner-up
2008	Puerto Rico International	(Peru) Andrés Corpancho	(Mexico) Jesús Aguilar (Mexico) Victoria Montero	21–10, 21–10	(gold) Winner
2009	Colombia International	(Peru) Mario Cuba	(Peru) Gonzalo Duany (Peru) Lorena Duany	21–18, 21–9	(gold) Winner
2009	Santo Domingo Open	(Peru) Mario Cuba	(Peru) Bruno Monteverde (Peru) Claudia Zornoza	21–14, 21–16	(gold) Winner
2009	Puerto Rico International	(Peru) Mario Cuba	(Peru) Bruno Monteverde (Peru) Claudia Zornoza	17–21, 19–21	(silver) Runner-up
2010	Colombia International	(Peru) Mario Cuba	(Peru) Rodrigo Pacheco (Peru) Claudia Rivero	1–0 retired	(gold) Winner
2014	Venezuela International	(Peru) Mario Cuba	(Czech Republic) Milan Ludík (United States) Rong Schafer	16–21, 16–21	(silver) Runner-up
2014	Chile International	(Peru) Mario Cuba	(Peru) Andrés Corpancho (Peru) Luz María Zornoza	11–3, 8–11, 11–10, 11–10	(gold) Winner
2014	Colombia International	(Peru) Mario Cuba	(Peru) Andrés Corpancho (Peru) Luz María Zornoza	10–11, 11–5, 7–11, 11–5, 10–11	(silver) Runner-up
2014	Suriname International	(Peru) Mario Cuba	(Peru) Andrés Corpancho (Peru) Luz María Zornoza	21–12, 21–8	(gold) Winner
2015	Peru International Series	(Peru) Mario Cuba	(Peru) Andrés Corpancho (Peru) Luz María Zornoza	21–13, 21–13	(gold) Winner
2015	Giraldilla International	(Peru) Mario Cuba	(Turkey) Ramazan Öztürk (Turkey) Neslihan Kılıç	Walkover	(gold) Winner
2015	Chile International	(Peru) Mario Cuba	(Brazil) Alex Yuwan Tjong (Brazil) Lohaynny Vicente	21–18, 21–16	(gold) Winner
2015	Santo Domingo Open	(Peru) Mario Cuba	(Austria) David Obernosterer (Austria) Elisabeth Baldauf	21–14, 16–21, 19–21	(silver) Runner-up
2016	Peru International Series	(Peru) Mario Cuba	(Peru) Diego Mini (Peru) Luz María Zornoza	23–21, 21–12	(gold) Winner
2017	Peru International Series	(Peru) Mario Cuba	(Peru) Daniel la Torre Regal (Peru) Dánica Nishimura	21–18, 21–18	(gold) Winner
2017	Peru International	(Peru) Mario Cuba	(Jamaica) Dennis Coke (Jamaica) Katherine Wynter	21–9, 21–9	(gold) Winner

BWF International Challenge tournament
BWF International Series tournament
BWF Future Series tournament
