= Adrian Liu =

Canadian badminton player

Adrian Liu 廖显邦
Personal information
- Born: Adrian Steven Liu; September 17, 1983 (age 43) Prince Rupert, British Columbia, Canada
- Height: 1.73 m (5 ft 8 in)
- Weight: 70 kg (154 lb)

Sport
- Country: Canada
- Sport: Badminton

Men's & mixed doubles
- Highest ranking: 25 (MD) October 3, 2011; 33 (XD) October 20, 2011
- BWF profile
Medal record
Badminton
Pan American Games
Bronze medal – third place	2011 Guadalajara	Men's doubles
Pan Am Championships
Gold medal – first place	2014 Markham	Men's doubles
Gold medal – first place	2014 Markham	Mixed team
Gold medal – first place	2013 Santo Domingo	Men's doubles
Gold medal – first place	2013 Santo Domingo	Mixed team
Gold medal – first place	2012 Lima	Men's doubles
Gold medal – first place	2012 Lima	Mixed team
Gold medal – first place	2010 Curitiba	Mixed team
Gold medal – first place	2009 Guadalajara	Mixed team
Gold medal – first place	2008 Lima	Mixed team
Bronze medal – third place	2010 Curitiba	Men's doubles
Bronze medal – third place	2010 Curitiba	Mixed doubles
Bronze medal – third place	2008 Lima	Men's doubles
Bronze medal – third place	2008 Lima	Mixed doubles

Adrian Liu (born September 17, 1983) is a male Canadian badminton player from Prince Rupert, British Columbia. He has been the top ranked men's individual and doubles player on the continent and a contender in major international competitions. He is a National champion in men's doubles and has won several international titles since 2010.

== Career ==
Liu is one of the leaders of the Canadian badminton team. With partner Derrick Ng, the two are a force to be reckoned with in men's doubles in Pan American competition. One of the highlights was winning bronze at the 2011 Pan American Games. In 2014 the duo won the Pan American Championships, defeating the top seeds in the final. They successfully defended their titles from 2013 and 2012 when they had been the number one seeds. Liu's career-high doubles ranking is 25th, achieved in 2011.

== Personal life ==
His parents are Steven and Katherine Liu and his younger sister Giselle. Liu who is of Chinese descent started playing badminton recreationally at aged 16, and began training full-time at 22 under coach Ronne Runtulalo. He graduated from Langara College in 2007 with a diploma in Human Kinetics.

== Achievements ==
=== Pan American Games ===
Men's Doubles
Year	Venue	Partner	Opponent	Score	Result
2011	Multipurpose Gymnasium; Guadalajara, Mexico	(Canada) Derrick Ng	(United States) Halim Ho (United States) Sattawat Pongnairat	20–22, 14–21	Bronze

=== Pan Am Championships ===
Men's Doubles
Year	Venue	Partner	Opponent	Score	Result
2014	Markham Pan Am Centre; Markham, Canada	(Canada) Derrick Ng	(United States) Phillip Chew (United States) Sattawat Pongnairat	21–15, 21–13	Gold
2013	Palacio de los Deportes Virgilio Travieso Soto; Santo Domingo, Dominican Republic	(Canada) Derrick Ng	(Canada) Kevin Li (Canada) Nyl Yakura	17–21, 21–6, 21–16	Gold
2012	Manuel Bonilla Stadium, Miraflores; Lima, Peru	(Canada) Derrick Ng	(Brazil) Daniel Paiola (Brazil) Alex Yuwan Tjong	21–9, 21–9	Gold
2010	Clube Curitibano; Curitiba, Brazil	(Canada) Derrick Ng	(United States) Sameera Gunatileka (United States) Vincent Nguy	20–22, 19–21	Bronze
2008	Club de Regatas; Lima, Peru	(Canada) Derrick Ng	(Guatemala) Kevin Cordon (Guatemala) Rodolfo Ramirez	17–21, 21–13, 14–21	Bronze

Mixed Doubles
Year	Venue	Partner	Opponent	Score	Result
2010	Clube Curitibano; Curitiba, Brazil	(Canada) Joycelyn Ko	(Canada) Toby Ng (Canada) Grace Gao	21–19, 13–21, 18–21	Bronze
2008	Club de Regatas; Lima, Peru	(Canada) Michelle Li	(Canada) Toby Ng (Canada) Valerie Loker	14–21, 15–21	Bronze

=== BWF Grand Prix ===
The BWF Grand Prix has two level such as Grand Prix and Grand Prix Gold. It is a series of badminton tournaments, sanctioned by Badminton World Federation (BWF) since 2007.

Men's Doubles
Year	Tournament	Partner	Opponent	Score	Result
2016	Canada Open	(Canada) Toby Ng	(India) Manu Attri (India) B. Sumeeth Reddy	8-21, 14–21	(silver) Runner-up

BWF Grand Prix Gold tournament
BWF Grand Prix tournament

=== BWF International Challenge/Series ===
Men's Doubles
Year	Tournament	Partner	Opponent	Score	Result
2015	Chile International Challenge	(Canada) Derrick Ng	(United States) Phillip Chew (United States) Sattawat Pongnairat	21–13, 20–22, 21–15	(gold) Winner
2014	USA International	(Canada) Derrick Ng	(Japan) Takuro Hoki (Japan) Yugo Kobayashi	17–21, 19–21	(silver) Runner-up
2013	Canadian International	(Canada) Derrick Ng	(Chinese Taipei) Hsu Jui-ting (Chinese Taipei) Tien Jen-chieh	14–21, 21–17, 16–21	(silver) Runner-up
2012	Tahiti International	(Canada) Derrick Ng	(Australia) Ross Smith (Australia) Glenn Warfe	23–21, 21–13	(gold) Winner
2012	Peru International	(Canada) Derrick Ng	(United States) Howard Bach (United States) Tony Gunawan	21–13, 13–21, 9–21	(silver) Runner-up
2011	Canadian International	(Canada) Derrick Ng	(Brazil) Hugo Arthuso (Brazil) Daniel Paiola	21–7, 21–15	(gold) Winner
2011	Puerto Rico International	(Canada) Derrick Ng	(Canada) Francoise Bourret (Canada) Kevin Li	21–9, 21–16	(gold) Winner
2011	Guatemala International	(Canada) Derrick Ng	(Russia) Vladimir Ivanov (Russia) Ivan Sozonov	13–21, 16–21	(silver) Runner-up
2011	Peru International	(Canada) Derrick Ng	(United States) Howard Bach (United States) Tony Gunawan	10–21, 9–21	(silver) Runner-up
2010	Santo Domingo Open	(Canada) Derrick Ng	(Guatemala) Kevin Cordon (Guatemala) Rodolfo Ramirez	18–21, 22–24	(silver) Runner-up
2010	Brazil International	(Canada) Derrick Ng	(Indonesia) Didit Juang Indrianto (Indonesia) Seiko Wahyu Kusdianto	16–21, 11–21	(silver) Runner-up
2010	Guatemala International	(Canada) Derrick Ng	(Guatemala) Kevin Cordon (Guatemala) Rodolfo Ramirez	23–21, 22–20	(gold) Winner
2010	Peru International	(Canada) Derrick Ng	(Japan) Hajime Komiyama (Japan) Hiroyuki Saeki	21–18, 10–21, 22–20	(gold) Winner

Mixed Doubles
Year	Tournament	Partner	Opponent	Score	Result
2011	Puerto Rico International	(Canada) Joycelyn Ko	(Canada) Toby Ng (Canada) Grace Gao	15–21, 22–24	(silver) Runner-up
2010	Santo Domingo Open	(Canada) Joycelyn Ko	(Canada) Toby Ng (Canada) Grace Gao	22–20, 14–21, 10–21	(silver) Runner-up

BWF International Challenge tournament
BWF International Series tournament
