= Mario Cuba =

Peruvian badminton player

Personal information
- Born: Mario Cuba Rodríguez; 9 December 1992 (age 33)
- Height: 1.80 m (5 ft 11 in)
- Weight: 72 kg (159 lb)

Sport
- Country: Peru
- Sport: Badminton

Men's singles & doubles
- Highest ranking: 108 (MS 14 May 2015); 58 (MD 15 October 2015); 37 (XD 2 April 2015)
- BWF profile
Medal record
Men's badminton
Representing Peru
Pan Am Games
Bronze medal – third place	2015 Toronto	Mixed doubles
Pan Am Championships
Silver medal – second place	2008 Lima	Mixed team
Bronze medal – third place	2009 Guadalajara	Men's doubles
Bronze medal – third place	2010 Curitiba	Mixed team
Bronze medal – third place	2014 Markham	Mixed doubles
Bronze medal – third place	2016 Campinas	Mixed team
Bronze medal – third place	2017 Havana	Men's doubles
Bronze medal – third place	2017 Havana	Mixed doubles

Mario Cuba Rodríguez (Note: In this Spanish name, the first or paternal surname is Cuba and the second or maternal family name is Rodríguez.) (born 9 December 1992) is a Peruvian badminton player. He competed at the 2010 Summer Youth Olympics, 2011 and 2015, and 2019 Pan American Games. In 2015 Pan American Games, he won the bronze medal in the mixed doubles event partnered with Katherine Winder.

== Achievements ==
=== Pan American Games ===
Mixed doubles
Year	Venue	Partner	Opponent	Score	Result
2015	Atos Markham Pan Am Centre; Markham, Canada	(Peru) Katherine Winder	(United States) Phillip Chew (United States) Jamie Subandhi	18–21, 14–21	Bronze

=== Pan Am Championships ===
Men's doubles
Year	Venue	Partner	Opponent	Score	Result
2009	Coliseo Olímpico de la Universidad de Guadalajara; Guadalajara, Mexico	(Peru) Bruno Monteverde	(Guatemala) Kevin Cordón (Guatemala) Rodolfo Ramírez	21–18, 14–21, 14–21	Bronze
2017	Sports City Coliseum; Havana, Cuba	(Peru) Diego Mini	(Canada) Jason Ho-Shue (Canada) Nyl Yakura	8–21, 14–21	Bronze

Mixed doubles
Year	Venue	Partner	Opponent	Score	Result
2014	Markham Pan Am Centre; Markham, Canada	(Peru) Katherine Winder	(United States) Phillip Chew (United States) Jamie Subandhi	9–21, 14–21	Bronze
2017	Sports City Coliseum; Havana, Cuba	(Peru) Katherine Winder	(Canada) Toby Ng (Canada) Rachel Honderich	13–21, 8–21	Bronze

=== BWF International Challenge/Series ===
Men's singles
Year	Tournament	Opponent	Score	Result
2009	Colombia International	(Brazil) Daniel Paiola	19–21, 15–21	(silver) Runner-up

Men's doubles
Year	Tournament	Partner	Opponent	Score	Result
2009	Brazil International	(Peru) Bruno Monteverde	(Peru) Antonio de Vinatea (Peru) Martín del Valle	21–23, 12–21	(silver) Runner-up
2014	Chile International	(Peru) Martín del Valle	(France) Arnaud Génin (United States) Bjorn Seguin	7–11, 10–11, 11–10, 9–11	(silver) Runner-up
2014	Suriname International	(Peru) Martín del Valle	(Suriname) Gilmar Jones (Suriname) Mitchel Wongsodikromo	21–11, 21–14	(gold) Winner
2015	Santo Domingo Open	(Peru) Martín del Valle	(Mexico) Job Castillo (Mexico) Lino Muñoz	18–21, 26–24, 17–21	(silver) Runner-up
2017	Peru International	(Peru) Diego Mini	(India) Alwin Francis (India) Tarun Kona	15–21, 15–21	(silver) Runner-up
2019	Peru Future Series	(Peru) Diego Mini	(Cuba) Osleni Guerrero (Cuba) Leodannis Martínez	14–21, 17–21	(silver) Runner-up

Mixed doubles
Year	Tournament	Partner	Opponent	Score	Result
2009	Colombia International	(Peru) Katherine Winder	(Peru) Gonzalo Duany (Peru) Lorena Duany	21–18, 21–9	(gold) Winner
2009	Santo Domingo Open	(Peru) Katherine Winder	(Peru) Bruno Monteverde (Peru) Claudia Zornoza	21–14, 21–16	(gold) Winner
2009	Puerto Rico International	(Peru) Katherine Winder	(Peru) Bruno Monteverde (Peru) Claudia Zornoza	17–21, 19–21	(silver) Runner-up
2010	Colombia International	(Peru) Katherine Winder	(Peru) Rodrigo Pacheco (Peru) Claudia Rivero	1–0 retired	(gold) Winner
2014	Venezuela International	(Peru) Katherine Winder	(Czech Republic) Milan Ludík (United States) Rong Schafer	16–21, 16–21	(silver) Runner-up
2014	Chile International	(Peru) Katherine Winder	(Peru) Andrés Corpancho (Peru) Luz María Zornoza	11–3, 8–11, 11–10, 11–10	(gold) Winner
2014	Colombia International	(Peru) Katherine Winder	(Peru) Andrés Corpancho (Peru) Luz María Zornoza	10–11, 11–5, 7–11, 11–5, 10–11	(silver) Runner-up
2014	Suriname International	(Peru) Katherine Winder	(Peru) Andrés Corpancho (Peru) Luz María Zornoza	21–12, 21–8	(gold) Winner
2015	Peru International Series	(Peru) Katherine Winder	(Peru) Andrés Corpancho (Peru) Luz María Zornoza	21–13, 21–13	(gold) Winner
2015	Giraldilla International	(Peru) Katherine Winder	(Turkey) Ramazan Öztürk (Turkey) Neslihan Kılıç	Walkover	(gold) Winner
2015	Chile International	(Peru) Katherine Winder	(Brazil) Alex Yuwan Tjong (Brazil) Lohaynny Vicente	21–18, 21–16	(gold) Winner
2015	Santo Domingo Open	(Peru) Katherine Winder	(Austria) David Obernosterer (Austria) Elisabeth Baldauf	21–14, 16–21, 19–21	(silver) Runner-up
2016	Peru International Series	(Peru) Katherine Winder	(Peru) Diego Mini (Peru) Luz María Zornoza	23–21, 21–12	(gold) Winner
2017	Peru International Series	(Peru) Katherine Winder	(Peru) Daniel la Torre Regal (Peru) Dánica Nishimura	21–18, 21–18	(gold) Winner
2017	Peru International	(Peru) Katherine Winder	(Jamaica) Dennis Coke (Jamaica) Katherine Wynter	21–9, 21–9	(gold) Winner
2019	Giraldilla International	(Peru) Daniela Macías	(Peru) José Guevara (Peru) Inés Castillo	21–12, 21–19	(gold) Winner

BWF International Challenge tournament
BWF International Series tournament
BWF Future Series tournament
