= Cristina Aicardi =

Peruvian badminton player

Personal information
- Born: Christina Irene Aicardi Cagigao; 14 January 1986 (age 40)
- Height: 1.75 m (5 ft 9 in)
- Weight: 62 kg (137 lb)

Sport
- Country: Peru
- Sport: Badminton
- Handedness: Right

Women's doubles
- Highest ranking: 33 (21 April 2011)
- BWF profile
Medal record
Badminton
Representing Peru
Pan Am Championships
Gold medal – first place	2008 Lima	Women's doubles
Silver medal – second place	2009 Guadalajara	Mixed team
Silver medal – second place	2008 Lima	Women's singles
Silver medal – second place	2008 Lima	Mixed team
Bronze medal – third place	2010 Curitiba	Women's doubles
Bronze medal – third place	2010 Curitiba	Mixed team
Bronze medal – third place	2009 Guadalajara	Women's doubles
Bronze medal – third place	2007 Calgary	Women's doubles
Bronze medal – third place	2007 Calgary	Mixed team
Bronze medal – third place	2005 Bridgetown	Women's doubles
Bronze medal – third place	2005 Bridgetown	Mixed team
Bronze medal – third place	2001 Lima	Women's doubles
South American Games
Gold medal – first place	2010 Medellín	Mixed team
Silver medal – second place	2010 Medellín	Women's singles
Silver medal – second place	2010 Medellín	Women's doubles

Christina Irene Aicardi Cagigao (born 14 January 1986) is a Peruvian badminton player. She competed at the 2007 and 2011 Pan American Games. In 2008, she won the gold medal at the Pan Am Championships in the women doubles partnered with Claudia Rivero. She played at the 2005 World Badminton Championships in Anaheim. In the women's singles event she lost in the first round to Elena Nozdran of Ukraine.

== Achievements ==
=== Pan Am Championships ===
Women's singles
Year	Venue	Opponent	Score	Result
2008	Lima, Peru	(Peru) Claudia Rivero	14–21, 16–21	Silver

Women's doubles
Year	Venue	Partner	Opponent	Score	Result
2010	Curitiba, Brazil	(Peru) Claudia Rivero	(Canada) Alexandra Bruce (Canada) Michelle Li	21–23, 21–18, 12–21	Bronze
2009	Guadalajara, Mexico	(Peru) Claudia Rivero	(Canada) Milaine Cloutier (Canada) Valerie St. Jacques	21–16, 17–21, 20–22	Bronze
2008	Lima, Peru	(Peru) Claudia Rivero	(Canada) Fiona Mckee (Canada) Valerie Loker	21–19, 21–15	Gold
2007	Calgary, Canada	(Peru) Claudia Rivero	(Canada) Fiona Mckee (Canada) Charmaine Reid	7–21, 13–21	Bronze
2005	Bridgetown, Barbados	(Peru) Claudia Rivero	(Canada) Helen Nichol (Canada) Charmaine Reid	5–15, 4–15	Bronze
2001	Lima, Peru	(Peru) Claudia Rivero	(Canada) Jody Patrick (Canada) Charmaine Reid	0–7, 1–7, 0–7	Bronze

=== South American Games ===
Women's singles
Year	Venue	Opponent	Score	Result
2010	Medellín, Colombia	(Peru) Claudia Rivero	18–21, 19–21	Silver

Women's doubles
Year	Venue	Partner	Opponent	Score	Result
2010	Medellín, Colombia	(Peru) Claudia Rivero	(Peru) Katherine Winder (Peru) Claudia Zornoza	21–10, 18–21, 22–24	Silver

=== BWF International Challenge/Series ===
Women's singles
Year	Tournament	Opponent	Score	Result
2012	Giraldilla International	(Peru) Claudia Rivero	21–13, 15–21, 21–19	(gold) Winner
2010	Suriname International	(Peru) Alejandra Monteverde	21–19, 21–13	(gold) Winner
2010	Colombia International	(Peru) Claudia Rivero	24–26, 21–16, 19–21	(silver) Runner-up
2009	Brazil International	(Peru) Claudia Rivero	23–25, 21–19, 21–11	(gold) Winner
2008	Miami Pan Am International	(Peru) Claudia Rivero	12–21, 7–21	(silver) Runner-up
2008	Brazil International	(Peru) Alejandra Monteverde	21–18, 21–10	(gold) Winner

Women's doubles
Year	Tournament	Partner	Opponent	Score	Result
2010	Suriname International	(Peru) Alejandra Monteverde	(Suriname) Danielle Melchiot (Suriname) Priscille Tjitrodipo	21–9, 21–13	(gold) Winner
2010	Puerto Rico International	(Peru) Claudia Rivero	(Germany) Nicole Grether (Canada) Charmaine Reid	12–21, 9–21	(silver) Runner-up
2010	Colombia International	(Peru) Claudia Rivero	(Peru) Katherine Winder (Peru) Claudia Zornoza	17–21, 24–22, 21–15	(gold) Winner
2010	Guatemala International	(Peru) Claudia Rivero	(Germany) Nicole Grether (Canada) Charmaine Reid	4–21, 8–21	(silver) Runner-up
2010	Peru International	(Peru) Claudia Rivero	(Germany) Nicole Grether (Canada) Charmaine Reid	15–21, 10–21	(silver) Runner-up
2009	Puerto Rico International	(Peru) Claudia Rivero	(Peru) Katherine Winder (Peru) Claudia Zornoza	21–10, 24–22	(gold) Winner
2009	Santo Domingo Open	(Peru) Claudia Rivero	(Peru) Katherine Winder (Peru) Claudia Zornoza	21–15, 21–16	(gold) Winner
2009	Peru International	(Peru) Claudia Rivero	(Cuba) Solangel Guzman (Cuba) Lisandra Suarez	21–12, 16–21, 21–16	(gold) Winner
2009	Brazil International	(Peru) Alejandra Monteverde	(Peru) Katherine Winder (Peru) Claudia Zornoza	22–20, 23–21	(gold) Winner
2008	Puerto Rico International	(Peru) Alejandra Monteverde	(Peru) Katherine Winder (Peru) Claudia Zornoza	11–21, 21–16, 16–21	(silver) Runner-up
2008	Brazil International	(Peru) Alejandra Monteverde	(Peru) Katherine Winder (Peru) Claudia Zornoza	23–21, 21–17	(gold) Winner
2008	Miami Pan Am International	(Peru) Claudia Rivero	(Australia) Tania Luiz (Australia) Eugenia Tanaka	13–21, 13–21	(silver) Runner-up
2007	Peru International	(Peru) Claudia Rivero	(Peru) Jie Meng (Peru) Valeria Rivero	21–13, 21–17	(gold) Winner

Mixed doubles
Year	Tournament	Partner	Opponent	Score	Result
2008	Miami Pan Am International	(Peru) Andrés Corpancho	(Peru) Martín del Valle (Peru) Katherine Winder	21–14, 18–21, 21–16	(gold) Winner
2008	Peru International	(Peru) Andrés Corpancho	(Peru) Martín del Valle (Peru) Daniela Cuba	15–21, 21–15, 21–18	(gold) Winner

BWF International Challenge tournament
BWF International Series tournament
BWF Future Series tournament
