= Derrick Ng =

Canadian badminton player

Derrick Ng 吴楷义
Personal information
- Born: September 21, 1987 (age 39) Vancouver, British Columbia, Canada
- Height: 1.80 m (5 ft 11 in)
- Weight: 70 kg (154 lb)

Sport
- Country: Canada
- Sport: Badminton
- Handedness: Right

Men's & mixed doubles
- Highest ranking: 25 (MD) March 10, 2011; 47 (XD) August 23, 2012
- BWF profile
Medal record
Badminton
Pan American Games
Bronze medal – third place	2011 Guadalajara	Men's doubles
Pan Am Championships
Gold medal – first place	2014 Markham	Men's doubles
Gold medal – first place	2014 Markham	Mixed team
Gold medal – first place	2013 Santo Domingo	Men's doubles
Gold medal – first place	2013 Santo Domingo	Mixed team
Gold medal – first place	2012 Lima	Men's doubles
Gold medal – first place	2012 Lima	Mixed doubles
Gold medal – first place	2012 Lima	Mixed team
Gold medal – first place	2010 Curitiba	Mixed team
Gold medal – first place	2008 Lima	Mixed team
Bronze medal – third place	2010 Curitiba	Men's doubles
Bronze medal – third place	2008 Lima	Men's doubles

Derrick Ng (born September 21, 1987) is a male Canadian badminton player from Vancouver, British Columbia. He has been the top ranked men's doubles player on the continent and a contender in major international competitions. He is the current and six consecutive times National champion in men's doubles and has won several national and international titles since 2010 in both men's and mixed doubles. His older brother, Toby Ng, is a renowned, competitive badminton player and a professional coach at the Bellevue Badminton Club. Derrick is now the Head Coach at Bellevue Badminton Club.

== Achievements ==
=== World Senior Championships ===
Men's singles
Year	Age	Venue	Opponent	Score	Result
2023	35+	Hwasan Indoor Stadium; Jeonju, South Korea	(New Zealand) Joe Wu	18–21, 14–21	Bronze

Mixed doubles
Year	Age	Venue	Partner	Opponent	Score	Result
2023	35+	Hwasan Indoor Stadium; Jeonju, South Korea	(United States) Pai Hsiao-ma	(Thailand) Nawut Thanathiratham (Thailand) Vacharaporn Munkit	18–21, 14–21	Silver

=== Pan American Games ===
Men's Doubles
Year	Venue	Partner	Opponent	Score	Result
2011	Multipurpose Gymnasium; Guadalajara, Mexico	(Canada) Adrian Liu	(United States) Halim Ho (United States) Sattawat Pongnairat	20–22, 14–21	Bronze

=== Pan Am Championships ===
Men's Doubles
Year	Venue	Partner	Opponent	Score	Result
2014	Markham Pan Am Centre; Markham, Canada	(Canada) Adrian Liu	(United States) Phillip Chew (United States) Sattawat Pongnairat	21–15, 21–13	Gold
2013	Palacio de los Deportes Virgilio Travieso Soto; Santo Domingo, Dominican Republic	(Canada) Adrian Liu	(Canada) Kevin Li (Canada) Nyl Yakura	17–21, 21–6, 21–16	Gold
2012	Manuel Bonilla Stadium, Miraflores; Lima, Peru	(Canada) Adrian Liu	(Brazil) Daniel Paiola (Brazil) Alex Yuwan Tjong	21–9, 21–9	Gold
2010	Clube Curitibano; Curitiba, Brazil	(Canada) Adrian Liu	(United States) Sameera Gunatileka (United States) Vincent Nguy	20–22, 19–21	Bronze
2008	Club de Regatas; Lima, Peru	(Canada) Adrian Liu	(Guatemala) Kevin Cordon (Guatemala) Rodolfo Ramirez	17–21, 21–13, 14–21	Bronze

Mixed Doubles
Year	Venue	Partner	Opponent	Score	Result
2012	Manuel Bonilla Stadium, Miraflores; Lima, Peru	(Canada) Alexandra Bruce	(Canada) Phillipe Charron (Canada) Phyllis Chan	21–5, 21–6	Gold
2008	Club de Regatas; Lima, Peru	(Canada) Michelle Li	(Canada) Toby Ng (Canada) Valerie Loker	14–21, 15–21	Bronze

=== BWF International Challenge/Series ===
Men's Doubles
Year	Tournament	Partner	Opponent	Score	Result
2015	Chile International Challenge	(Canada) Adrian Liu	(United States) Phillip Chew (United States) Sattawat Pongnairat	21–13, 20–22, 21–15	(gold) Winner
2014	USA International	(Canada) Adrian Liu	(Japan) Takuro Hoki (Japan) Yugo Kobayashi	17–21, 19–21	(silver) Runner-up
2013	Canadian International	(Canada) Adrian Liu	(Chinese Taipei) Hsu Jui-ting (Chinese Taipei) Tien Jen-chieh	14–21, 21–17, 16–21	(silver) Runner-up
2012	Tahiti International	(Canada) Adrian Liu	(Australia) Ross Smith (Australia) Glenn Warfe	23–21, 21–13	(gold) Winner
2012	Peru International	(Canada) Adrian Liu	(United States) Howard Bach (United States) Tony Gunawan	21–13, 13–21, 9–21	(silver) Runner-up
2011	Canadian International	(Canada) Adrian Liu	(Brazil) Hugo Arthuso (Brazil) Daniel Paiola	21–7, 21–15	(gold) Winner
2011	Puerto Rico International	(Canada) Adrian Liu	(Canada) Francoise Bourret (Canada) Kevin Li	21–9, 21–16	(gold) Winner
2011	Guatemala International	(Canada) Adrian Liu	(Russia) Vladimir Ivanov (Russia) Ivan Sozonov	13–21, 16–21	(silver) Runner-up
2011	Peru International	(Canada) Adrian Liu	(United States) Howard Bach (United States) Tony Gunawan	10–21, 9–21	(silver) Runner-up
2010	Santo Domingo Open	(Canada) Adrian Liu	(Guatemala) Kevin Cordon (Guatemala) Rodolfo Ramirez	18–21, 22–24	(silver) Runner-up
2010	Brazil International	(Canada) Adrian Liu	(Indonesia) Didit Juang Indrianto (Indonesia) Seiko Wahyu Kusdianto	16–21, 11–21	(silver) Runner-up
2010	Guatemala International	(Canada) Adrian Liu	(Guatemala) Kevin Cordon (Guatemala) Rodolfo Ramirez	23–21, 22–20	(gold) Winner
2010	Peru International	(Canada) Adrian Liu	(Japan) Hajime Komiyama (Japan) Hiroyuki Saeki	21–18, 10–21, 22–20	(gold) Winner

Mixed Doubles
Year	Tournament	Partner	Opponent	Score	Result
2014	Peru International	(Canada) Michelle Li	(United States) Christian Yahya Christianto (United States) Eva Lee	16–21, 18–21	(silver) Runner-up
2012	Tahiti International	(Canada) Alexandra Bruce	(Australia) Ross Smith (Australia) Renuga Veeran	21–23, 14–21	(silver) Runner-up
2012	Peru International	(Canada) Alexandra Bruce	(Canada) Toby Ng (Canada) Grace Gao	10–21, 15–21	(silver) Runner-up
2011	Canadian International	(Canada) Alexandra Bruce	(Canada) Toby Ng (Canada) Grace Gao	15–21, 19–21	(silver) Runner-up
2011	Guatemala International	(Canada) Alexandra Bruce	(Canada) Toby Ng (Canada) Grace Gao	20–22, 14–21	(silver) Runner-up
2010	Puerto Rico International	(Canada) Phyllis Chan	(United States) Holvy Depauw (United States) Grace Peng	21–16, 10–21, 13–21	(silver) Runner-up
2010	Canadian International	(Canada) Jiang Xuelian	(Canada) Toby Ng (Canada) Grace Gao	23–21, 18–21, 24–26	(silver) Runner-up
2010	Peru International	(Canada) Phyllis Chan	(Canada) Toby Ng (Canada) Grace Gao	21–11, 19–21, 20–22	(silver) Runner-up

BWF International Challenge tournament
BWF International Series tournament

=== Canadian National Championships ===
Men's Doubles

Year	Partner	Results
2016	(British Columbia) Adrian Liu	(gold) Gold
2015	(British Columbia) Adrian Liu	(gold) Gold
2014	(British Columbia) Adrian Liu	(gold) Gold
2013	(British Columbia) Adrian Liu	(gold) Gold
2012	(British Columbia) Adrian Liu	(gold) Gold
2011	(British Columbia) Adrian Liu	(gold) Gold

Mixed Doubles

Year	Partner	Results
2014	(British Columbia) Christin Tsai	(gold) Winner
2012	(Ontario) Alexandra Bruce	(silver) Silver
2011	(British Columbia) Phyllis Chan	(silver) Silver
2010	(British Columbia) Melody Liang	(bronze) Bronze
