= Badminton at the 2010 South American Games – Men's singles =

The Men's Singles event at the 2010 South American Games was held over March 21–24.

== Medalists ==
Gold	Silver	Bronze
Daniel Paiola; Brazil	Hugo Arthuso; Brazil	Antonio Juan Estrada; Peru; Anders Eduardo Fort; Peru

== Draw ==
=== Finals ===
Semifinals
1	Daniel Paiola (BRA)	21	21
3	Antonio Juan Estrada (PER)	14	13
4	Hugo Arthuso (BRA)	21	14	21
2	Anders Eduardo Fort (PER)	17	21	17

Final
1	Daniel Paiola (BRA)	13	21	24
2	Hugo Arthuso (BRA)	21	18	22

=== Top half ===
First Round
Federico Diaz (ARG)	21	21
Carlos Roberto Moreno (COL)	19	10

Second Round
1	Daniel Paiola (BRA)	21	21
Joaquin Berrios (ARG)	20	10
Mitchel Wongsodikromo (SUR)	21	21
Sergio Armando Ochoa (COL)	14	6
3	Antonio Juan Estrada (PER)	21	23
Andres Matias Alfaro (CHI)	11	21
Sebastian Alcivar (ECU)	21	21
Federico Diaz (ARG)	18	19

Quarterfinals
1	Daniel Paiola (BRA)	14	21	21
Mitchel Wongsodikromo (SUR)	21	15	'4
3	Antonio Juan Estrada (PER)	21	21	21
Sebastian Alcivar (ECU)	23	11	16

Semifinals
1	Daniel Paiola (BRA)	21	21
8	Antonio Juan Estrada (PER)	14	13

==== Bottom half ====
First Round
Santiago Jose Solano (ECU)	21	21
Rodrigo Daniel Carrillo (PER)	7	10

Second Round
Rodrigo Daniel Carrillo (PER)	21	21
Cristian David Torres (COL)	5	12
Esteban Andres Peralta (CHI)	14	11
4	Hugo Arthuso (BRA)	21	21
Virgil Soeroredjo (SUR)	19	13
Alex Tjong (BRA)	21	21
Jose Martin Villalba (ARG)	10	12
2	Anders Eduardo Fort (PER)	21	21

Quarterfinals
1	Rodrigo Daniel Carrillo (PER)	21	16	9
4	Hugo Arthuso (BRA)	11	21	21
Alex Tjong (BRA)	19	11
2	Anders Eduardo Fort (PER)	21	21

Semifinals
4	Hugo Arthuso (BRA)	21	14	21
2	Anders Eduardo Fort (PER)	17	21	17
