= Claudia Rivero =

Peruvian badminton player

Personal information
- Born: Claudia Rivero Modenesi; 28 November 1986 (age 39) Lima, Peru
- Height: 1.63 m (5 ft 4 in)

Sport
- Country: Peru
- Sport: Badminton
- Handedness: Right

Women's singles & doubles
- Highest ranking: 33 (WD) (21 April 2011)
- BWF profile
Medal record
Badminton
Representing Peru
Pan American Games
Bronze medal – third place	2011 Guadalajara	Women's singles
Bronze medal – third place	2011 Guadalajara	Mixed doubles
Bronze medal – third place	2007 Rio de Janeiro	Women's singles
Bronze medal – third place	2007 Rio de Janeiro	Mixed doubles
Pan Am Championships
Gold medal – first place	2008 Lima	Women's singles
Gold medal – first place	2008 Lima	Women's doubles
Silver medal – second place	2009 Guadalajara	Mixed team
Silver medal – second place	2008 Lima	Mixed team
Silver medal – second place	2007 Calgary	Women's singles
Bronze medal – third place	2010 Curitiba	Women's doubles
Bronze medal – third place	2010 Curitiba	Mixed team
Bronze medal – third place	2009 Guadalajara	Women's singles
Bronze medal – third place	2009 Guadalajara	Women's doubles
Bronze medal – third place	2007 Calgary	Women's doubles
Bronze medal – third place	2007 Calgary	Mixed team
Bronze medal – third place	2005 Bridgetown	Women's doubles
Bronze medal – third place	2005 Bridgetown	Mixed team
Bronze medal – third place	2001 Lima	Women's doubles
South American Games
Gold medal – first place	2010 Medellín	Women's singles
Gold medal – first place	2010 Medellín	Mixed doubles
Gold medal – first place	2010 Medellín	Mixed team
Silver medal – second place	2010 Medellín	Women's doubles
Pan Am Junior Championships
Gold medal – first place	2004 Lima	Girls' singles
Silver medal – second place	2004 Lima	Girls' doubles
Bronze medal – third place	2004 Lima	Mixed team

Claudia Rivero Modenesi (born 28 November 1986 in Lima) is a Peruvian badminton player. She won the bronze medal in the singles and mixed doubles category at the 2007 and the 2011 Pan American Games. Rivero represented her country at the 2008 and the 2012 Olympic Games. She was the champion in the women's singles and doubles at the 2008 Pan Am Badminton Championships in Lima, Peru.

== Achievements ==
=== Pan American Games ===
Women's singles
Year	Venue	Opponent	Score	Result
2011	Multipurpose Gymnasium; Guadalajara, Mexico	(Canada) Joycelyn Ko	9–21, 21–17, 10–21	Bronze
2007	Pavilion 4B Riocentro Sports Complex; Rio de Janeiro, Brazil	(Canada) Charmaine Reid	10–21, 19–21	Bronze

Mixed doubles
Year	Venue	Partner	Opponent	Score	Result
2011	Multipurpose Gymnasium; Guadalajara, Mexico	(Peru) Rodrigo Pacheco	(United States) Halim Ho (United States) Eva Lee	13–21, 19–21	Bronze
2007	Pavilion 4B Riocentro Sports Complex; Rio de Janeiro, Brazil	(Peru) Rodrigo Pacheco	(United States) Howard Bach (United States) Eva Lee	13–21, 13–21	Bronze

=== Pan Am Championships ===
Women's singles
Year	Venue	Opponent	Score	Result
2009	Guadalajara, Mexico	(Canada) Anna Rice	11–21, 12–21	Bronze
2008	Lima, Peru	(Peru) Cristina Aicardi	21–14, 21–16	Gold
2007	Calgary, Canada	(Canada) Anna Rice	16–21, 11–21	Silver

Women's doubles
Year	Venue	Partner	Opponent	Score	Result
2010	Curitiba, Brazil	(Peru) Cristina Aicardi	(Canada) Alexandra Bruce (Canada) Michelle Li	21–23, 21–18, 12–21	Bronze
2009	Guadalajara, Mexico	(Peru) Cristina Aicardi	(Canada) Milaine Cloutier (Canada) Valerie St. Jacques	21–16, 17–21, 20–22	Bronze
2008	Lima, Peru	(Peru) Cristina Aicardi	(Canada) Fiona McKee (Canada) Valerie Loker	21–19, 21–15	Gold
2007	Calgary, Canada	(Peru) Cristina Aicardi	(Canada) Fiona McKee (Canada) Charmaine Reid	7–21, 13–21	Bronze
2005	Bridgetown, Barbados	(Peru) Cristina Aicardi	(Canada) Helen Nichol (Canada) Charmaine Reid	5–15, 4–15	Bronze
2001	Lima, Peru	(Peru) Cristina Aicardi	(Canada) Jody Patrick (Canada) Charmaine Reid	0–7, 1–7, 0–7	Bronze

=== South American Games ===
Women's singles
Year	Venue	Opponent	Score	Result
2010	Medellín, Colombia	(Peru) Cristina Aicardi	21–18, 21–19	Gold

Women's doubles
Year	Venue	Partner	Opponent	Score	Result
2010	Medellín, Colombia	(Peru) Cristina Aicardi	(Peru) Katherine Winder (Peru) Claudia Zornoza	21–10, 18–21, 22–24	Silver

Mixed doubles
Year	Venue	Partner	Opponent	Score	Result
2010	Medellín, Colombia	(Peru) Rodrigo Pacheco	(Brazil) Alex Tjong (Brazil) Yasmin Cury	21–15, 21–15	Gold

=== Pan Am Junior Championships ===
Girls' singles
Year	Venue	Opponent	Score	Result
2004	Lima, Peru	(Peru) Cristina Aicardi	11–6, 11–6	Gold

Girls' doubles
Year	Venue	Partner	Opponent	Score	Result
2004	Lima, Peru	(Peru) Cristina Aicardi	(United States) Jamie Subandhi (United States) Daphne Ng	11–15, 15–5, 6–15	Silver

=== BWF International Challenge/Series ===
Women's singles
Year	Tournament	Opponent	Score	Result
2012	Giraldilla International	(Peru) Cristina Aicardi	13–21, 21–15, 19–21	(silver) Runner-up
2010	Colombia International	(Peru) Cristina Aicardi	26–24, 16–21, 21–19	(gold) Winner
2009	Brazil International	(Peru) Cristina Aicardi	25–23, 19–21, 11–21	(silver) Runner-up
2009	Peru International	(Cuba) Solangel Guzman	21–18, 21–15	(gold) Winner
2008	Miami Pan Am International	(Peru) Cristina Aicardi	21–12, 21–7	(gold) Winner
2008	Peru International	(Spain) Lucía Tavera	21–8, 21–14	(gold) Winner
2008	Uganda International	(Italy) Agnese Allegrini	20–22, 10–21	(silver) Runner-up
2007	Peru International	(Cuba) Leidis Mora	21–15, 21–9	(gold) Winner

Women's doubles
Year	Tournament	Partner	Opponent	Score	Result
2010	Puerto Rico International	(Peru) Cristina Aicardi	(Germany) Nicole Grether (Canada) Charmaine Reid	12–21, 9–21	(silver) Runner-up
2010	Colombia International	(Peru) Cristina Aicardi	(Peru) Katherine Winder (Peru) Claudia Zornoza	17–21, 24–22, 21–15	(gold) Winner
2010	Guatemala International	(Peru) Cristina Aicardi	(Germany) Nicole Grether (Canada) Charmaine Reid	4–21, 8–21	(silver) Runner-up
2010	Peru International	(Peru) Cristina Aicardi	(Germany) Nicole Grether (Canada) Charmaine Reid	15–21, 10–21	(silver) Runner-up
2009	Puerto Rico International	(Peru) Cristina Aicardi	(Peru) Katherine Winder (Peru) Claudia Zornoza	21–10, 24–22	(gold) Winner
2009	Santo Domingo Open	(Peru) Cristina Aicardi	(Peru) Katherine Winder (Peru) Claudia Zornoza	21–15, 21–16	(gold) Winner
2009	Peru International	(Peru) Cristina Aicardi	(Cuba) Solangel Guzman (Cuba) Lisandra Suarez	21–12, 16–21, 21–16	(gold) Winner
2008	Miami Pan Am International	(Peru) Cristina Aicardi	(Australia) Tania Luiz (Australia) Eugenia Tanaka	13–21, 13–21	(silver) Runner-up
2007	Peru International	(Peru) Cristina Aicardi	(Peru) Jie Meng (Peru) Valeria Rivero	21–13, 21–17	(gold) Winner

Mixed doubles
Year	Tournament	Partner	Opponent	Score	Result
2010	Colombia International	(Peru) Rodrigo Pacheco	(Peru) Mario Cuba (Peru) Katherine Winder	1–0 Retired	(gold) Winner
2009	Peru International	(Peru) Antonio de Vinatea	(Guatemala) Pedro Yang (Spain) Paula Rodriguez	21–18, 12–21, 13–21	(silver) Runner-up
2007	Peru International	(Peru) Rodrigo Pacheco	(Canada) Mike Beres (Canada) Valerie Loker	11–21, 14–21	(silver) Runner-up
2006	Peru International	(Peru) Javier Jimeno	(Indonesia) Roy Purnomo (Peru) Valeria Rivero		(silver) Runner-up

BWF International Challenge tournament
BWF International Series tournament
BWF Future Series tournament
