= Haiti national badminton team =

National badminton team representing Haiti

Haiti
- Association: Fédération Haïtienne de Badminton (FHB)
- Confederation: BPA (Pan America)
- President: Pierre Emmanuel Bijou

BWF ranking
- Current ranking: 126 (2 January 2024)
- Highest ranking: 109 (6 April 2017)

The Haiti national badminton team (French: Équipe d'Haïti de badminton; Haitian Creole: Ekip nasyonal badminton Ayiti) represents Haiti in international badminton team competitions. It is administered by Federation Haitienne de Badminton, the governing body for badminton in Haiti. The Haitian national team is ranked 115 on the BWF World Team Ranking.

The Haitian junior team competed in the 2017 Pan Am Junior Badminton Championships mixed team event. The team finished in 10th place in the tournament.

== Participation in Pan American Badminton Championships ==
Mixed team U19

| Year | Result |
|---|---|
| 2017 | Group B - 10th |

== Players ==
=== Current squad ===
As of 2 January 2024

==== Men's team ====
| Name | DoB/Age | Ranking of event | | |
| Name | DoB/Age | MS | MD | XD |
|---|---|---|---|---|
| Richardson Mathieu | 21 March 1996 (age 29) | - | - | - |
| Walter Jean-Pierre | 23 January 2001 (age 24) | - | - | - |
| Ricardy Pierre-Paul | 21 February 2001 (age 24) | - | - | - |

==== Women's team ====
| Name | DoB/Age | Ranking of event | | |
| Name | DoB/Age | WS | WD | XD |
|---|---|---|---|---|
| Alanda Baptiste | 9 December 2000 (age 24) | - | - | - |
| Durlie Pierre-Louis | 24 October 2000 (age 24) | - | - | - |
| Neila Jean | 10 April 2003 (age 21) | - | - | - |
