= Zdeněk Sváta =

Czech badminton player (born 1982)

Personal information
- Born: 17 August 1982 (age 44)

Sport
- Country: Czech Republic
- Sport: Badminton

Men's singles & doubles
- Highest ranking: 305 (MS 21 April 2011); 92 (MD 8 May 2014)
- BWF profile

Zdeněk Sváta (born 17 August 1982) is a Czech badminton player. He was the men's doubles champion at the 2013 Giraldilla International and runner-up in the Mercosul International partnered with Jan Fröhlich.

== Achievements ==
=== BWF International Challenge/Series ===
Men's doubles
Year	Tournament	Partner	Opponent	Score	Result	Ref.
2013	Giraldilla International	(Czech Republic) Jan Fröhlich	(Dominican Republic) Nelson Javier (Dominican Republic) Freddy López	21–8, 21–14	(gold) Winner	
2013	Mercosul International	(Czech Republic) Jan Fröhlich	(Brazil) Hugo Arthuso (Brazil) Alex Yuwan Tjong	20–22, 15–21	(silver) Runner-up	

BWF International Challenge tournament
BWF International Series tournament
BWF Future Series tournament
