= Pan Am Junior Badminton Championships =

Badminton championships in the Americas

The Pan Am Junior Badminton Championships is a tournament organized for the 29th time in July 2021 by the Badminton Pan Am (BPA) confederation to crown the best badminton junior players in the Americas.

The tournament is played in a juniors mixed team event for under 19 and a juniors individual event for different age groups simultaneously. Member countries of Badminton Pan Am can apply in advance as candidates to organize the event. The Pan Am Junior Team Badminton Championship is being played annually for the Charles Nowles Memorial Trophy.

== Pan Am Junior Badminton Championships - Individual Gold Medal Winners ==
Year	Event	Boys' Singles	Girls' Singles	Boys' Doubles	Girls' Doubles	Mixed Doubles
1996	U19	(United States) Howard Bach	(Peru) Sandra Jimeno	(Canada) Bobby Milroy (Canada) William Milroy	(Jamaica) Alya Lewis (Jamaica) Nigella Saunders	(Peru) Guillermo Perea (Peru) Sandra Jimeno
Year	Event	Boys' Singles	Girls' Singles	Boys' Doubles	Girls' Doubles	Mixed Doubles
1998	U19	(Canada) William Milroy	(Canada) Anna Rice	(Canada) William Milroy (Canada) Sam Smith	(United States) Casey Peters (United States) Elie Wu	(Canada) William Milroy (Canada) Lindsay van Riper
Year	Event	Boys' Singles	Girls' Singles	Boys' Doubles	Girls' Doubles	Mixed Doubles
2002	U19	(United States) Eric Go	(United States) Hu Jun Xia	(United States) Mike Chansawangpuvana (United States) Eric Go	(United States) Samantha Jinadasa (United States) Eva Lee	(United States) Nicholas Jinadasa (United States) Eva Lee
2002	U17	(Canada) Richard Liang	(United States) Samantha Jinadasa	(United States) Daniel Gouw (United States) Brendan Taft	(Peru) Cristina Aicardi (Peru) Claudia Rivero	(United States) Daniel Gouw (United States) Samantha Jinadasa
2002	U15	(Canada) Alex Pang	(United States) Jamie Subandhi	(Canada) Andy Cheong (Peru) Martín del Valle	(United States) Lauren Todt (United States) Jamie Subandhi	(Canada) Alex Pang (Canada) Sophina Verjee
2002	U13	(United States) Howard Shu	(United States) Priscilla Lun	(United States) Richard Fung (United States) Howard Shu	(United States) Cheryl Chow (United States) Priscilla Lun	(United States) Howard Shu (United States) Susana Zhong
2002	U11	(Peru) Mario Cuba	(United States) Isabel Zhong	(Peru) Mario Cuba (Peru) Waldemar Schroeder	(Peru) Andrea Alvarez (Peru) Lorena Duany	(United States) Brendan Lum (United States) Chloe Chow
Year	Event	Boys' Singles	Girls' Singles	Boys' Doubles	Girls' Doubles	Mixed Doubles
2004	U19	(Guatemala) Kevin Cordón	(Peru) Claudia Rivero	(United States) Daniel Gouw (United States) Brandon Taft	(United States) Daphne Ng (United States) Jamie Subandhi	(United States) Brandon Taft (United States) Lauren Todt
2004	U17	(Peru) Antonio de Vinatea	(Peru) Alejandra Monteverde	(Peru) Antonio de Vinatea (Peru) Martín del Valle	(Peru) Daniela Cuba (Peru) Alejandra Monteverde	(Peru) Antonio de Vinatea (Peru) Alejandra Monteverde
2004	U15	(Canada) Jonathan Ma	(Canada) Lysa Morishita	(Canada) Peter Butler (Canada) Jonathan Ma	(Peru) Caridad Frias (Peru) Claudia Zornoza	(Canada) Jonathan Ma (Canada) Lysa Morishita
2004	U13	(United States) Brendan Lum	(Peru) Katherine Winder	(Peru) Mario Cuba (Peru) Waldemar Schroeder	(Peru) Lorena Duany (Peru) Katherine Winder	(Peru) Mario Cuba (Peru) Lorena Duany
2004	U11	(Mexico) Andrés Quadri	(Peru) Micaela Rivero	(Mexico) Luis Ramón Garrido (Mexico) Andrés Quadri	(Peru) Camilla García (Peru) Micaela Rivero	(Mexico) Andrés Quadri (Mexico) Nidia González
Year	Event	Boys' Singles	Girls' Singles	Boys' Doubles	Girls' Doubles	Mixed Doubles
2006	U19	(Peru) Antonio de Vinatea	(United States) Lauren Todt	(United States) Azam Ali (United States) Sasha Boyarin	(United States) Daphne Ng (United States) Lauren Todt	(United States) Jack Shu (United States) Jamie Subandhi
2006	U17	(Peru) Bruno Monteverde	(United States) Rena Wang	(Jamaica) Gareth Henry (Jamaica) Chadwick Parsons	(Peru) Manuela Olcese (Peru) Claudia Zornoza	(United States) Howard Shu (United States) Rena Wang
2006	U15	(Mexico) Andrés López	(Peru) Lorena Duany	(Peru) Mario Cuba (Peru) Waldemar Schroeder	(Peru) Lorena Duany (Peru) Katherine Winder	(Peru) Mario Cuba (Peru) Katherine Winder
2006	U13	(Mexico) Andrés Quadri	(United States) Iris Wang	(Peru) Pablo Antonio Aguilar (Peru) Gonzalo Duany	(Brazil) Taina Coelho (Brazil) Luana Vicente	(Peru) Pablo Antonio Aguilar (Peru) Micaela Rivero
2006	U11	(Brazil) Ygor Coelho	(Peru) Camilla García	(Brazil) Ygor Coelho (Brazil) Fabio Soares	(Brazil) Stefanny Lopes (Brazil) Lohaynny Vicente	(Brazil) Ygor Coelho (Brazil) Lohaynny Vicente
Year	Event	Boys' Singles	Girls' Singles	Boys' Doubles	Girls' Doubles	Mixed Doubles
2007	U19	(Cuba) Osleni Guerrero	(United States) Jamie Subandhi	(United States) Howard Shu (United States) Jack Shu	(Canada) Grace Gao (Canada) Chelcia Petersen	(Canada) Logan Campbell (Canada) Chelcia Petersen
2007	U17	(Jamaica) Gareth Henry	(Canada) Michelle Li	(Peru) Mario Cuba (Peru) Bruno Monteverde	(Canada) Phyllis Chan (Canada) Michelle Li	(Mexico) Lino Muñoz (Mexico) Victoria Montero
2007	U15	(Canada) Nyl Yakura	(Puerto Rico) Irytsha González	(Canada) David Ponich (Canada) Nyl Yakura	(Puerto Rico) Irytsha González (Puerto Rico) Daneysha Santana	(Canada) Nyl Yakura (Canada) Kacey Tung
2007	U13	(Brazil) Ygor Coelho	(Peru) Camilla García	(Puerto Rico) Aleandro Roman (Puerto Rico) Bryan Valentín	(Peru) Camilla García (Peru) Micaela Rivero	(Peru) Gonzalo Duany (Peru) Micaela Rivero
2007	U11	(Jamaica) Sean Wilson	(Peru) Daniela Macías	(Jamaica) Sean Wilson (Jamaica) Shane Wilson	(Puerto Rico) Niurka Cordero (Puerto Rico) Génesis Valentín	(Jamaica) Sean Wilson (Peru) Daniela Macías
Year	Event	Boys' Singles	Girls' Singles	Boys' Doubles	Girls' Doubles	Mixed Doubles
2008	U19	(Canada) Martin Giuffre	(United States) Rena Wang	(Canada) Martin Giuffre (Canada) David Pastewka	(United States) Priscilla Lun (United States) Rena Wang	(United States) Howard Shu (United States) Cheryl Chow
2008	U17	(Peru) Mario Cuba	(Canada) Surabhi Kadam	(United States) Zenas Lam (United States) Brendan Lum	(Canada) Surabhi Kadam (Canada) Jessica Leung	(Peru) Mario Cuba (Peru) Katherine Winder
2008	U15	(United States) Phillip Chew	(United States) Iris Wang	(United States) Phillip Chew (United States) Andrew Nicholas Susanto	(Canada) Carolyn O'Dwyer (Canada) Josephine Wu	(United States) Phillip Chew (United States) Iris Wang
2008	U13	(Brazil) Ygor Coelho	(Brazil) Lohaynny Vicente	(Brazil) Ygor Coelho (Brazil) Fabio Soares	(Peru) Camilla García (Peru) Daniela Zapata	(Brazil) Ygor Coelho (Brazil) Lohaynny Vicente
2008	U11	(Jamaica) Shane Wilson	(United States) Micaela Lum	(United States) Vinson Chiu (Jamaica) Shane Wilson	(United States) Micaela Lum (United States) Crystal Pan	(United States) Vinson Chiu (United States) Micaela Lum
Year	Event	Boys' Singles	Girls' Singles	Boys' Doubles	Girls' Doubles	Mixed Doubles
2009	U19	(Brazil) Thomas Moretti	(United States) Rena Wang	(Peru) Mario Cuba (Peru) Bruno Monteverde	(United States) Iris Wang (United States) Rena Wang	(Peru) Mario Cuba (Peru) Katherine Winder
2009	U17	(Canada) Nyl Yakura	(United States) Iris Wang	(Canada) Nathan Leung (Canada) Clinton Wong	(United States) Emily Kan (United States) Samantha Li	(United States) Phillip Chew (United States) Iris Wang
2009	U15	(Canada) Duncan Yao	(United States) Zandra Ho	(United States) William Cheung (United States) Derrick Long	(Brazil) Mariana Freitas (Brazil) Lohaynny Vicente	(United States) William Cheung (United States) Samantha Li
2009	U13	(Jamaica) Sean Wilson	(United States) Anna Tang	(United States) Timothy Lam (United States) Darren Yang	(United States) Crystal Pan (United States) Christine Yang	(United States) Christopher Kan (United States) Anna Tang
2009	U11	(Jamaica) Shane Wilson	(Brazil) Vera Costa	(United States) Richard Chen (United States) Cadmus Yeo	(Brazil) Shayene Carvalho (Brazil) Vera Costa	(United States) Cadmus Yeo (United States) Joanna Liu
Year	Event	Boys' Singles	Girls' Singles	Boys' Doubles	Girls' Doubles	Mixed Doubles
2010	U19	(Canada) Nyl Yakura	(Canada) Surabhi Kadam	(Canada) Henry Wiebe (Canada) Nyl Yakura	(Puerto Rico) Jaylene Forestier (Puerto Rico) Daneysha Santana	(Canada) Nyl Yakura (Canada) Adrianna Giuffre
2010	U17	(Canada) Felix Deblois-Beaucage	(Puerto Rico) Daneysha Santana	(United States) William Cheung (United States) Kenneth Hui	(Canada) Qufei Chen (Canada) Josephine Wu	(Puerto Rico) Aleandro Roman (Puerto Rico) Daneysha Santana
2010	U15	(Brazil) Ygor Coelho	(Brazil) Lohaynny Vicente	(United States) Pow Hwa Cha (United States) Aston Khor	(Canada) Kyleigh O'Donoghue (Canada) Takeisha Wang	(Brazil) Ygor Coelho (Brazil) Lohaynny Vicente
2010	U13	(Mexico) Francisco Treviño	(United States) Micaela Lum	(United States) Vinson Chiu (United States) Brian Duong	(United States) Priscilla Long (United States) Micaela Lum	(United States) Vinson Chiu (United States) Micaela Lum
2010	U11	(Brazil) Donnians Oliveira	(United States) Michelle Zhang	(Brazil) Jonathan Matias (Brazil) Donnians Oliveira	(United States) Breanna Chi (United States) Cindy Yuan	(United States) Robert Huang (United States) Cindy Yuan
Year	Event	Boys' Singles	Girls' Singles	Boys' Doubles	Girls' Doubles	Mixed Doubles
2011	U19	(Canada) Clinton Wong	(Mexico) Mariana Ugalde	(Canada) Clinton Wong (Canada) Nyl Yakura	(United States) Claudia Hardi (United States) Samantha Li	(Canada) Nyl Yakura (Canada) Adrianna Giuffre
2011	U17	(Canada) Duncan Yao	(Brazil) Lohaynny Vicente	(Canada) Mac Lee (Canada) Nathan Osborne	(Canada) Takeisha Wang (Canada) Josephine Wu	(Canada) Nathan Osborne (Canada) Josephine Wu
2011	U15	(United States) Justin Ma	(United States) Christine Yang	(United States) Raymond Hsia (United States) Albert Li	(United States) Victoria Chen (United States) Crystal Pan	(United States) Darren Yang (United States) Victoria Chen
2011	U13	(Jamaica) Shane Wilson	(Canada) Erin O´Donoghue	(Brazil) Walleson Evangelista (Brazil) Fabrício Farias	(United States) Breanna Chi (United States) Stephanie Yu	(United States) Cadmus Yeo (United States) Stephanie Yu
2011	U11	(United States) Clayton Cayen	(United States) Breanna Chi	(Peru) Nicolás Macías (Peru) Gustavo Alfredo Salazar	(United States) Jennie Gai (United States) Julie Yang	(United States) Eric Chang (United States) Breanna Chi
Year	Event	Boys' Singles	Girls' Singles	Boys' Doubles	Girls' Doubles	Mixed Doubles
2012	U19	(Canada) Andrew D'Souza	(United States) Iris Wang	(United States) Phillip Chew (United States) Jeffrey Kuo	(United States) Cherie Chow (United States) Christine Yang	(United States) Phillip Chew (United States) Iris Wang
2012	U17	(Brazil) Ygor Coelho	(Canada) Rachel Honderich	(Mexico) Luis Ramón Garrido (Mexico) Daniel Martínez	(Canada) Rachel Honderich (Canada) Brittney Tam	(Brazil) Ygor Coelho (Brazil) Lohaynny Vicente
2012	U15	(Canada) Jason Ho-Shue	(United States) Crystal Pan	(United States) Vinson Chiu (United States) Brian Duong	(United States) Nicole Frevold (United States) Soumya Gade	(United States) Brian Duong (United States) Priscilla Long
2012	U13	(Brazil) Fabricio Farias	(United States) Joanna Liu	(United States) Derek Hu (United States) Xiu Liu	(United States) Joanna Liu (United States) Karen Ma	(United States) Xiu Liu (United States) Joanna Liu
2012	U11	(United States) Don Averia	(United States) Karina Chan	(United States) Eric Duong (United States) Tony Liuzhou	(United States) Karina Chan (United States) Tammy Xie	(United States) Eric Duong (United States) Cassandra Yu
Year	Event	Boys' Singles	Girls' Singles	Boys' Doubles	Girls' Doubles	Mixed Doubles
2013	U19	(Brazil) Ygor Coelho	(Brazil) Lohaynny Vicente	(Canada) Benny Lin (Canada) Duncan Yao	(United States) Cherie Chow (United States) Christine Yang	(Canada) Nathan Osborne (Canada) Josephine Wu
2013	U17	(Canada) Jason Ho-Shue	(United States) Crystal Pan	(Canada) Jason Ho-Shue (Canada) Jonathan Lai	(United States) Victoria Chen (United States) Crystal Pan	(Canada) Ty Alexander Lindeman (Canada) Takeisha Wang
2013	U15	(Brazil) Jonathan Mathias	(United States) Kerry Xu	(United States) Andre Wang (United States) Cadmus Yeo	(United States) Annie Xu (United States) Kerry Xu	(United States) Cadmus Yeo (United States) Annie Xu
2013	U13	(United States) Clayton Cayen	(United States) Jennie Gai	(United States) Clayton Cayen (United States) Alexander Zheng	(United States) Jennie Gai (United States) Helen Ye	(United States) Alexander Zheng (United States) Jennie Gai
2013	U11	(United States) Don Averia	(United States) Lauren Lam	(United States) Brandon Xu (United States) Joshua Yuan	(United States) Claire Chen (United States) Tiffany Kuang	(United States) Brandon Xu (United States) Lauren Lam
Year	Event	Boys' Singles	Girls' Singles	Boys' Doubles	Girls' Doubles	Mixed Doubles
2014	U19	(United States) Timothy Lam	(United States) Crystal Pan	(Jamaica) Samuel Ricketts (Jamaica) Sean Wilson	(United States) Annie Xu (United States) Kerry Xu	(United States) Darren Yang (United States) Victoria Chen
2014	U17	(Peru) José Guevara	(United States) Priscilla Long	(United States) Vinson Chiu (United States) Brian Duong	(United States) Priscilla Long (United States) Madeline Sporkert	(United States) Joseph Pitman (United States) Nicole Frevold
2014	U15	(United States) Ricky Liuzhou	(United States) Jamie Hsu	(Canada) Kyle To (Canada) Brian Yang	(United States) Cindy Yuan (United States) Michelle Zhang	(United States) Ricky Liuzhou (United States) Joanna Liu
2014	U13	(United States) Don Averia	(United States) Cassandra Yu	(United States) Don Averia (United States) Eric Duong	(United States) Lauren Lam (United States) Cassandra Yu	(United States) Don Averia (United States) Lauren Lam
2014	U11	(United States) Andrew Yuan	(United States) Netra Shetty	(United States) Siddharta Javvaji (United States) Andrew Wang	(United States) Kalea Sheung (United States) Jolie Wang	(United States) Joshua Yeung (United States) Netra Shetty
Year	Event	Boys' Singles	Girls' Singles	Boys' Doubles	Girls' Doubles	Mixed Doubles
2015	U19	(Canada) Jason Ho-Shue	(Canada) Qingzi Ouyang	(Canada) Jason Ho-Shue (Canada) Jonathan Lai	(United States) Annie Xu (United States) Kerry Xu	(Canada) Jason Ho-Shue (Canada) Qingzi Ouyang
2015	U17	(Mexico) Ailton Correa	(United States) Cindy Yuan	(United States) Ricky Liuzhou (United States) Cadmus Yeo	(Canada) Katie Ho-Shue (Canada) Vania Wu	(Canada) Brian Yang (Canada) Katie Ho-Shue
2015	U15	(Canada) Brian Yang	(United States) Jennie Gai	(Peru) Nicolás Macías (Peru) Gustavo Alfredo Salazar	(Canada) Catherine Choi (Canada) Talia Ng	(United States) Dean Tan (United States) Jennie Gai
2015	U13	(Brazil) Thiago Mozer Ribeiro	(United States) Evelyn Zeng	(United States) Brandon Xu (United States) Joshua Yuan	(United States) Claire Chen (United States) Tiffany Kuang	(United States) Joshua Yuan (United States) Claire Chen
2015	U11	(United States) Ryan Ma	(United States) Francesca Corbett	(United States) Ryan Ma (United States) Thompson Ma	(United States) Francesca Corbett (United States) Hailey Hung	(United States) Ryan Ma (United States) Kaitlyn Wang
Year	Event	Boys' Singles	Girls' Singles	Boys' Doubles	Girls' Doubles	Mixed Doubles
2016	U19	(Brazil) Cleyson Nobre Santos	(Canada) Qingzi Ouyang	(Canada) Desmond Wang (Canada) Brian Yang	(Canada) Giselle Chan (Canada) Katie Ho-Shue	(Canada) Brian Yang (Canada) Katie Ho-Shue
2016	U17	(Canada) Brian Yang	(Canada) Katie Ho-Shue	(United States) Bryce Kan (United States) Ethan Low	(Brazil) Jacqueline Lima (Brazil) Sâmia Lima	(Brazil) Fabricio Farias (Brazil) Sâmia Lima
2016	U15	(United States) Don Averia	(United States) Lauren Lam	(United States) Don Averia (United States) Eric Duong	(United States) Karina Chan (United States) Lauren Lam	(Peru) Gustavo Alfredo Salazar (Peru) Ariana Monomisato
2016	U13	(United States) Siddharta Javvaji	(Brazil) Juliana Viana	(United States) Daniel Bielin (United States) Siddharta Javvaji	(United States) Nettra Shetty (United States) Jolie Wang	(United States) Andrew Yuan (United States) Kalea Sheung
2016	U11	(United States) Weslie Chen	(United States) Veronica Yang	(United States) Kai Chong (United States) Alvin Ng	(United States) Chloe Ho (United States) Veronica Yang	(United States) Weslie Chen (United States) Veronica Yang
Year	Event	Boys' Singles	Girls' Singles	Boys' Doubles	Girls' Doubles	Mixed Doubles
2017	U19	(Canada) Brian Yang	(United States) Lauren Lam	(Brazil) Fabricio Farias (Brazil) Vinicios Santos	(United States) Breanna Chi (United States) Cindy Yuan	(Canada) Brian Yang (Canada) Katie Ho-Shue
2017	U17	(Brazil) Willian Guimarães	(Canada) Talia Ng	(Peru) Nicolás Macías (Peru) Gustavo Alfredo Salazar	(Canada) Catherine Choi (Canada) Talia Ng	(Canada) Kyle To (Canada) Crystal Lai
2017	U15	(United States) Brandon Xu	(Canada) Rachel Chan	(United States) Brandon Xu (United States) Joshua Yuan	(United States) Nicole Ju (United States) Jolie Wang	(United States) Brandon Xu (United States) Claire Chen
2017	U13	(Canada) Joshua Nguyen	(United States) Francesca Corbett	(United States) Ryan Ma (United States) Isaac Yang	(United States) Francesca Corbett (United States) Allison Lee	(United States) Ryan Ma (United States) Kaitlyn Wang
2017	U11	(United States) Linden Wang	(United States) Jasmine Yeung	(United States) Scott Lin (United States) Linden Wang	(United States) Sahasra Chada (United States) Jasmine Yeung	(United States) Scott Lin (United States) Jasmine Yeung
Year	Event	Boys' Singles	Girls' Singles	Boys' Doubles	Girls' Doubles	Mixed Doubles
2018	U19	(Brazil) Jonathan Matias	(Canada) Talia Ng	(United States) Ryan Zheng (United States) Winston Tsai	(Canada) Crystal Lai (Canada) Wendy Zhang	(Canada) Kevin Wang (Canada) Wendy Zhang
2018	U17	(Brazil) Willian Guimarães	(Canada) Jacqueline Cheung	(Brazil) Rafael Faria (Brazil) Willian Guimarães	(Canada) Jacqueline Cheung (Canada) Tiffany Too	(Canada) Darren Choi (Canada) Jacqueline Cheung
2018	U15	(United States) Daniel Bielin	(United States) Natalie Chi	(United States) Adrian Mar (United States) Andrew Wang	(United States) Natalie Chi (United States) Kalea Sheung	(United States) Andrew Wang (United States) Jolie Wang
2018	U13	(United States) Adam Tay	(United States) Veronica Yang	(United States) Jeffrey Chang (United States) Kyle Wang	(United States) Chloe Ho (United States) Veronica Yang	(United States) Weslie Chen (United States) Veronica Yang
2018	U11	(Canada) Oliver Chen	(Canada) Lyric Su	(Canada) Oliver Chen (Canada) Ricky Tao	(Canada) Paula Guo (Canada) Lyric Su	(Canada) Oliver Chen (Canada) Lyric Su
Year	Event	Boys' Singles	Girls' Singles	Boys' Doubles	Girls' Doubles	Mixed Doubles
2019	U19	(Canada) Brian Yang	(United States) Natalie Chi	(Canada) Jonathan Chien (Canada) Brian Yang	(Canada) Crystal Lai (Canada) Wendy Zhang	(Canada) Jonathan Chien (Canada) Crystal Lai
2019	U17	(Canada) Victor Lai	(Canada) Jeslyn Chow	(United States) Henry Tang (United States) Joshua Yang	(Canada) Rachel Chan (Canada) Jeslyn Chow	(Canada) Victor Lai (Canada) Jessica Cheng
2019	U15	(Canada) Josh Nguyen	(United States) Francesca Corbett	(United States) Arthur Lee (United States) Jerry Yuan	(United States) Francesca Corbett (United States) Allison Lee	(United States) Aaron Bai (United States) Allison Lee
2019	U13	(United States) Linden Wang	(United States) Vera Lin	(Canada) Liam Zhang (Canada) Rongpeng Zhou	(United States) Jasmine La (United States) Jasmine Yeung	(United States) Garret Tan (United States) Carryssa Caryn Bun
2019	U11	(Canada) Solomon Tong	(Canada) Susanna Wang	(Canada) John Fu (Canada) Ethan Yuen	(Canada) Kelly Liu (Canada) Susanna Wang	(Canada) Ethan Yuen (Canada) Rosey Yin
Year	Event	Boys' Singles	Girls' Singles	Boys' Doubles	Girls' Doubles	Mixed Doubles
2021	U19	(United States) Ryan Ma	(United States) Natalie Chi	(United States) Aaron Low (United States) Adrian Mar	(United States) Allison Lee (United States) Francesca Corbett	(United States) Joshua Yuan (United States) Allison Lee
2021	U17	(United States) Robert Shekhtman	(Peru) Fernanda Munar Solimano	(United States) Neil Ganguly (United States) Michael Xu	(United States) Reanne Chan (United States) Chloe Ho	(United States) Neil Ganguly (United States) Andrea Li
2021	U15	(United States) Linden Wang	(United States) Audrey Chang	(United States) Arden Lee (United States) Calvin Zhou	(United States) Bettie Huang (United States) Emily Liu	(United States) Linden Wang (United States) Mia Hundley
2021	U13	(United States) Shriyans Bhagavatula	(United States) Micah Cruz	(United States) Akshaj Donthi (United States) Rylan Tan	(United States) Sydney Li (United States) Xinyan Zeng	(United States) Rylan Tan (United States) Micah Cruz
Year	Event	Boys' Singles	Girls' Singles	Boys' Doubles	Girls' Doubles	Mixed Doubles
2022	U19	(Canada) Josh Nguyen	(Canada) Jackie Dent	(United States) Aaron Bai (United States) Ryan Ma	(Canada) Jessica Cheng (Canada) Nong Sophia	(Canada) Josh Nguyen (Canada) Chloe Hoang
2022	U17	(Canada) Kevin Wang	(United States) Mia Zhang	(United States) Kai Chong (United States) Linden Wang	(United States) Mia Hundley (United States) Emma Wei	(United States) Kyle Wang (United States) Ella Lin
2022	U15	(Canada) Oliver Chen	(United States) Nicole Krawczyk	(Canada) Oliver Chen (Canada) Ricky Tao	(United States) Angela Ye (United States) Jasmine Yeung	(United States) Vaughn Zhao (United States) Jasmine Yeung
2022	U13	(United States) Vincent Chen	(United States) Annie Meng	(United States) Vincent Chen (United States) Aarya Vijay	(Canada) Susanna Wang (Canada) Fulgencia Simmons Zhang	(Canada) Michael Zubin Sun (Canada) Rosey Yin
Year	Event	Boys' Singles	Girls' Singles	Boys' Doubles	Girls' Doubles	Mixed Doubles
2023	U19	(United States) Ryan Ma	(United States) Veronica Yang	(United States) Isaac Yang (United States) Weslie Chen	(United States) Chloe Ho (United States) Ella Lin	(United States) Ryan Ma (United States) Veronica Yang
2023	U17	(Canada) Asher Bedi	(Canada) Emma Meng	(United States) Anderson Lin (United States) William Ye	(Canada) Mengyao Tian (Canada) Kaylee Sichen Wang	(Canada) Rongpeng Zhou (Canada) Emma Meng
2023	U15	(United States) Evan Liu	(United States) Micah Cruz	(United States) Arush Shyam Chitgopkar (United States) Abhi Ram Mandanapu	(United States) Micah Cruz (United States) Brianna Yu-Qian Lee	(United States) Shriyans Ankith Bhagavatula (United States) Micah Cruz
2023	U13	(United States) Rithik Rasamsetti	(United States) Joanne Li	(United States) Seth Li (United States) Rithik Rasamsetti	(United States) Kimaya Krishna (United States) Joanne Li	(United States) Rithik Rasamsetti (United States) Tvisha Modi
Year	Event	Boys' Singles	Girls' Singles	Boys' Doubles	Girls' Doubles	Mixed Doubles
2024	U19	(Canada) Asher Bedi	(Canada) Kaylee Sichen Wang	(United States) Weslie Chen (United States) Kyle Wang	(Canada) Mengyao Tian (Canada) Kaylee Sichen Wang	(Canada) Oliver Chen (Canada) Lyric Su
2024	U17	(United States) Nihal Kadamba	(United States) Jasmine Yeung	(United States) Nihal Kadamba (United States) Justin Kan	(United States) Zoey Tan (United States) Cassidy Yeh	(United States) Arush Shyam Chitgopkar (United States) Sophia Jia
2024	U15	(United States) Rithik Rasamsetti	(United States) Annie Meng	(Canada) Michael Zubin Sun (Canada) Stanley Rui Yang Zhang	(United States) Annie Meng (United States) Katie Wong	(United States) Anirud Veldanda (United States) Annie Meng
2024	U13	(United States) Jacob Zhou	(United States) Alice Meng	(United States) Srineet Atluri (United States) Mikael Chang	(United States) Alice Meng (United States) Sophia Sun	(United States) Srineet Atluri (United States) Stephanie Song
Year	Event	Boys' Singles	Girls' Singles	Boys' Doubles	Girls' Doubles	Mixed Doubles
2025	U19	(United States) Garret Tan	(United States) Audrey Chang	(United States) Youshi Chen (United States) Tian Qi Zhang	(United States) Audrey Chang (United States) Jasmine Yeung	(United States) Tian Qi Zhang (United States) Audrey Chang
2025	U17	(Canada) Kevin Yang	(United States) Lydia Chao	(United States) Evan Liu (United States) Justin Xia	(United States) Sasha Suman (United States) Yalan Zhu	(United States) Jaden Ke Hong Chen (United States) Chloe Kai
2025	U15	(Canada) Victor Ma	(United States) Vivian Feng	(Canada) Victor Ma (Canada) Andy Zeng	(United States) Vivian Feng (United States) Michelle Zhang	(United States) William Geng (United States) Vivian Feng
2025	U13	(United States) Varish Karri	(Canada) Valiree Zhou	(United States) Melvin Cui (United States) Aditya Namboodiripad	(United States) Lilian Feng (United States) Keira Winarto	(United States) Varish Karri (United States) Keira Winarto
Year	Event	Boys' Singles	Girls' Singles	Boys' Doubles	Girls' Doubles	Mixed Doubles
2026	U19	(United States) Rithik Rasamsetti	(United States) Micah Cruz	(United States) Noah Chien (United States) Rithik Rasamsetti	(United States) Micah Cruz (United States) Sydney Li	(Canada) Ryan Yuxuan Huang (Canada) Jasmine Yuexin Zhang
2026	U17	(United States) Saatvik Shetty	(Canada) Emily Luo	(United States) Brendan Chen (United States) Ethan Wu	(Canada) Emily Luo (Canada) Rosey Yin	(Canada) Kevin Zhou (Canada) Rosey Yin
2026	U15	(Canada) Quentin Wu	(United States) Alice Meng	(United States) Srineet Atluri (United States) Mikael Chang	(United States) Mihika Jaiswal (United States) Alice Meng	(United States) Jacob Ma (United States) Bella Liu
2026	U13	(United States) Aayush Jaladurgam	(United States) Hannah Xiao	(United States) Anirudh Rudharraju (United States) Kevin Xie	(United States) Grace Cheng (United States) Sophia Liu	(United States) Michael Sun (United States) Grace Cheng

== Pan Am Junior Badminton Championships - Mixed Team Event Winners ==
Year	Host city	Gold (gold)	Silver (silver)	Bronze (bronze)
1977				
1979	Manhattan Beach, California, USA			
1980	Lima, Peru			
1981	Mexico City, Mexico	Peru	Canada	United States
1982				
1984				
1986				
1988		Canada		
1990	Guatemala City, Guatemala	Guatemala	United States	Mexico
1992	Lima, Peru	Peru	Guatemala	
1994	Havana, Cuba	Guatemala		
1996	San Juan, Puerto Rico	United States	Canada	Peru
1998	Guadalajara, Mexico	Canada	United States	Jamaica
2000	Havana, Cuba	Canada	United States	Cuba
2002	California, United States	United States	Peru	Suriname
2004	Lima, Peru	United States	Canada	Peru
2006	Campinas, Brazil	Peru	Canada	United States
2007	Puerto Vallarta, Mexico	United States	Peru	Canada
2008	Guatemala City, Guatemala	Peru	Mexico	United States
2009	Guaynabo, Puerto Rico	United States	Peru	Canada
2010	Santo Domingo, Dominican Republic	United States	Peru	Canada
2011	Kingston, Jamaica	Canada	Brazil	Guatemala
2012	Edmonton, Canada	United States	Canada	Brazil
2013	Puerto Vallarta, Mexico	Canada	Brazil	United States
2014	Guatemala City, Guatemala	United States	Brazil	Mexico
2015	Tijuana, Mexico	United States	Brazil	Canada
2016	Lima, Peru	Canada	Brazil	United States
2017	Markham, Canada	United States	Canada	Brazil
2018	Salvador, Brazil	Canada	Brazil	United States
2019	Moncton, Canada	Canada	United States	Brazil
2021	Acapulco, Mexico	United States	Brazil	Mexico
2022	Santo Domingo, Dominican Republic	United States	Canada	Brazil
2023	Lima, Peru	United States	Canada	Peru
2024	Aguascalientes, Mexico	United States	Canada	Mexico
2025	Guatemala City, Guatemala	United States	Canada	Brazil
2026	João Pessoa, Brazil	United States	Canada	Peru
