= Alex Yuwan Tjong =

Brazilian badminton player

Personal information
- Born: 1 March 1991 (age 35) Campinas, São Paulo
- Height: 1.78 m (5 ft 10 in)
- Weight: 71 kg (157 lb)

Sport
- Country: Brazil
- Sport: Badminton
- Coached by: Right

Men's
- Highest ranking: 93 (MS) 4 June 2015; 54 (MD) 8 December 2011; 48 (XD) 9 April 2015
- BWF profile
Medal record
Pan American Games
Bronze medal – third place	2015 Toronto	Mixed doubles
Pan American Championships
Silver medal – second place	2016 Campinas	Mixed team
Silver medal – second place	2012 Lima	Men's doubles
Bronze medal – third place	2016 Campinas	Men's singles
Bronze medal – third place	2014 Markham	Mixed team
Bronze medal – third place	2013 Santo Domingo	Mixed team
Bronze medal – third place	2012 Lima	Mixed team
South American Games
Silver medal – second place	2010 Medellín	Men's doubles
Silver medal – second place	2010 Medellín	Mixed doubles
Silver medal – second place	2010 Medellín	Mixed team

Alex Yuwan Tjong (born 1 March 1991) is a Brazilian male badminton player. He started playing badminton in his hometown in 1997 at age six because his father took him and his brothers to play badminton on a weekend. In 2004, at age 13, he selected to join the Brazil national badminton team. In 2015, at age 24, he competed at the Pan American Games and won a bronze in the mixed doubles event partnered with Lohaynny Vicente.

== Achievements ==
=== Pan American Games ===
Mixed Doubles
Year	Venue	Partner	Opponent	Score	Result
2015	Atos Markham Pan Am Centre; Toronto, Ontario, Canada	(Brazil) Lohaynny Vicente	(Canada) Toby Ng (Canada) Alexandra Bruce	17-21, 16-21	Bronze

=== Pan American Championships ===
Men's Singles
Year	Venue	Opponent	Score	Result
2016	Clube Fonte São Paulo; Campinas, Brazil	(Canada) Jason Ho-Shue	14-21, 18-21	Bronze

Men's Doubles
Year	Venue	Partner	Opponent	Score	Result
2012	Manuel Bonilla Stadium, Miraflores; Lima, Peru	(Brazil) Daniel Paiola	(Canada) Adrian Liu (Canada) Derrick Ng	9-21, 9-21	Silver

=== South American Games ===
Men's Doubles
Year	Venue	Partner	Opponent	Score	Result
2010	Medellín, Colombia	(Brazil) Daniel Paiola	(Peru) Antonio de Vinatea (Peru) Rodrigo Pacheco	14-21, 19-21	Silver

Mixed Doubles
Year	Venue	Partner	Opponent	Score	Result
2010	Medellín, Colombia	(Brazil) Yasmin Cury	(Peru) Rodrigo Pacheco (Peru) Claudia Rivero	15-21, 15-21	Silver

=== BWF International Challenge/Series ===
Men's Doubles
Year	Tournament	Partner	Opponent	Score	Result
2015	Colombia International	(Brazil) Daniel Paiola	(Italy) Giovanni Greco (Italy) Rosario Maddaloni	21-16, 21-17	(gold) Winner
2014	Venezuela International	(Brazil) Fabio da Silva Soares	(Brazil) Hugo Arthuso (Brazil) Daniel Paiola	21-16, 18–21, 14-21	(silver) Runner-up
2013	Santo Domingo Open	(Brazil) Hugo Arthuso	(Jamaica) Gareth Henry (Jamaica) Samuel Ricketts	21-19, 16–21, 15-21	(silver) Runner-up
2013	Brazil International	(Brazil) Hugo Arthuso	(United States) Phillip Chew (United States) Sattawat Pongnairat	21-12, 13–21, 15-21	(silver) Runner-up
2013	Argentina International	(Brazil) Hugo Arthuso	(Peru) Andres Corpancho (Peru) Gonzalo Duany	21-18, 21-19	(gold) Winner
2013	Mercosul International	(Brazil) Hugo Arthuso	(Czech Republic) Jan Frohlich (Czech Republic) Svata Zdenek	22-20, 21-15	(gold) Winner
2011	Internacional Mexicano	(Brazil) Luis Henrique Dos Santos Jr.	(Mexico) Lino Munoz (Mexico) Andres Lopez	21-15, 14–21, 18-21	(silver) Runner-up

Mixed Doubles
Year	Tournament	Partner	Opponent	Score	Result
2015	Puerto Rico International	(Brazil) Lohaynny Vicente	(Brazil) Daniel Paiola (Brazil) Fabiana Silva	21-12, 18–21, 25-23	(gold) Winner
2015	Chile International Challenge	(Brazil) Luana Vicente	(United States) Phillip Chew (United States) Jamie Subandhi	14-21, 14-21	(silver) Runner-up
2015	Argentina International	(Brazil) Lohaynny Vicente	(Austria) David Obernosterer (Austria) Elisabeth Baldauf	Retired	(silver) Runner-up
2015	Colombia International	(Brazil) Fabiana Silva	(Peru) Daniel La Torre Regal (Peru) Daniela Macias	21-19, 19–21, 21-14	(gold) Winner
2015	Internacional Mexicano	(Brazil) Luana Vicente	(Austria) David Obernosterer (Austria) Elisabeth Baldauf	17-21, 17-21	(silver) Runner-up
2015	Chile International	(Brazil) Lohaynny Vicente	(Peru) Mario Cuba (Peru) Katherine Winder	18-21, 16-21	(silver) Runner-up
2014	Argentina International	(Brazil) Lohaynny Vicente	(Brazil) Hugo Arthuso (Brazil) Fabiana Silva	21-19, 21-19	(gold) Winner
2013	Santo Domingo Open	(Brazil) Lohaynny Vicente	(Brazil) Hugo Arthuso (Brazil) Fabiana Silva	21-9, 21-13	(gold) Winner

BWF International Challenge tournament
BWF International Series tournament
BWF Future Series tournament
