= Badminton at the 2010 South American Games =

- Venue: Plaza Mayor
- Location: Medellín, Colombia
- Dates: 19–24 March

The badminton tournament at the South American Games (a.k.a. ODESUR Games; Spanish: Juegos Sudamericanos; Portuguese: Jogos Sul-Americanos), formerly the Southern Cross Games (Spanish: Juegos Cruz del Sur) are a part of regional multi-sport event held between nations from South America, organized by the South American Sports Organization (Organización Deportiva Sudamericana, ODESUR). There were six badminton events at the 2010 South American Games held over 19–24 March in Centro de Convenciones Plaza Mayor, Medellín, Colombia.

== Medal summary ==
=== Medal table ===
Rank	Nation	Gold	Silver	Bronze	Total
1	Peru (PER)	5	2	3	10
2	Brazil (BRA)	1	4	3	8
3	Ecuador (ECU)	0	0	2	2
3	Suriname (SUR)	0	0	2	2
5	Chile (CHI)	0	0	1	1
Totals (5 entries)		6	6	11	23

=== Medalists ===
Event	Gold	Silver	Bronze
Men's events
Men's singles	Daniel Paiola; Brazil	Hugo Arthuso; Brazil	Antonio Juan Estrada; Peru; Andrés Corpancho; Peru
Men's doubles	Antonio de Vinatea; Rodrigo Pacheco; Peru	Daniel Paiola; Alex Tjong; Brazil	Sebastian Teran; Santiago Zambrano; Ecuador; Andrés Corpancho; Bruno Monteverde; Peru
Women's events
Women's singles	Claudia Rivero; Peru	Cristina Aicardi; Peru	Yasmin Cury; Brazil; Paula Pereira; Brazil
Women's doubles	Katherine Winder; Claudia Zornoza; Peru	Cristina Aicardi; Claudia Rivero; Peru	Ting Ting Hu; Natalia Villegas; Chile; Edith Loza; Denisse Mera; Ecuador
Mixed events
Mixed doubles	Rodrigo Pacheco; Claudia Rivero; Peru	Alex Tjong; Yasmin Cury; Brazil	Mitchel Wongsodikromo; Crystal Leefmans; Suriname; Hugo Arthuso; Marina Eliezer; Brazil
Mixed team	Cristina Aicardi; Andres Eduardo Fort; Antonio Juan Estrada; Bruno Guillen; Rodrigo Pacheco; Claudia Rivero; Katherine Cochella; Claudia Zornoza; Peru	Hugo Arthuso; Yasmin Cury; Marina Eliezer; Daniel Paiola; Paula Pereira; Fabiana Silva; Alex Tjong; Brazil	Crystal Leefmans; Quennie Pawirosemito; Virgil Soeroredjo; Mitchel Wongsodikromo; Suriname
