= 2008 Pan Am Badminton Championships =

The XIV 2008 Pan Am Badminton Championships were held in Lima, Peru, between October 1 and October 5, 2008.

This event was part of the 2008 BWF Grand Prix Gold and Grand Prix series of the Badminton World Federation.

== Venue ==
- Club de Regatas, Lima

== Medalists ==
Event	Gold	Silver	Bronze
Men's singles	(Canada) David Snider	(Canada) Stephan Wojcikiewicz	(Guatemala) Kevin Cordón
Men's singles	(Canada) David Snider	(Canada) Stephan Wojcikiewicz	(Peru) Andres Corpancho
Women's singles	(Peru) Claudia Rivero	(Peru) Cristina Aicardi	(Canada) Jocelyn Ko
Women's singles	(Peru) Claudia Rivero	(Peru) Cristina Aicardi	(United States) Shannon Pohl
Men's doubles	(Canada) Toby Ng and William Milroy	(Guatemala) Rodolfo Ramirez and Kevin Cordón	(Peru) Antonio de Vinatea and Martin del Valle
Men's doubles	(Canada) Toby Ng and William Milroy	(Guatemala) Rodolfo Ramirez and Kevin Cordón	(Canada) Adrian Liu and Derrick Ng
Women's doubles	(Peru) Cristina Aicardi and Claudia Rivero	(Canada) Fiona Mckee and Valerie Loker	(United States) Rulien Yeh and Rulan Yeh
Women's doubles	(Peru) Cristina Aicardi and Claudia Rivero	(Canada) Fiona Mckee and Valerie Loker	(Peru) Katherine Winder and Claudia Zornoza
Mixed doubles	(Canada) William Milroy and Fiona Mckee	(Canada) Toby Ng and Valerie Loker	(Canada) Adrian Liu and Michelle Li
Mixed doubles	(Canada) William Milroy and Fiona Mckee	(Canada) Toby Ng and Valerie Loker	(Brazil) Hugo Arthuso and Marina Eliezer
Teams	Canada	Peru	United States
