= Martín del Valle =

Peruvian badminton player (born 1988)

Personal information
- Born: Martín Alonso del Valle Salinas; 27 February 1988 (age 38)
- Height: 1.78 m (5 ft 10 in)
- Weight: 73 kg (161 lb)

Sport
- Country: Peru
- Sport: Badminton

Men's singles & doubles
- Highest ranking: 129 (MS 14 October 2010); 50 (MD 14 October 2010); 75 (XD 16 July 2015)
- BWF profile
Medal record
Men's badminton
Representing Peru
Pan Am Championships
| Silver medal – second place | 2008 Lima | Mixed team |
| Silver medal – second place | 2009 Guadalajara | Men's doubles |
| Silver medal – second place | 2009 Guadalajara | Mixed team |
| Bronze medal – third place | 2008 Lima | Men's doubles |
| Bronze medal – third place | 2010 Curitiba | Mixed team |

Martín Alonso del Valle Salinas (born 27 February 1988) is a Peruvian badminton player. He competed at the 2011 and 2015 Pan Am Games. In 2008, he won the bronze medal at the Pan Am Badminton Championships in the men's doubles event partnered with Antonio de Vinatea, and in 2009, he and Vinatea won the silver medal. In 2013, he won the gold medal in the mixed team event and a silver medal in the men's doubles event at the Bolivarian Games.

== Achievements ==
=== Pan Am Championships ===
Men's doubles
| Year | Venue | Partner | Opponent | Score | Result |
|---|---|---|---|---|---|
| 2008 | Club de Regatas; Lima, Peru | (Peru) Antonio de Vinatea | (Canada) Toby Ng (Canada) William Milroy | 14–21, 11–21 | Bronze |
| 2009 | Coliseo Olímpico de la Universidad de Guadalajara; Guadalajara, Mexico | (Peru) Antonio de Vinatea | (Guatemala) Rodolfo Ramirez (Guatemala) Kevin Cordón | 18–21, 21–17, 21–23 | Silver |

=== BWF International Challenge/Series ===
Men's doubles
| Year | Tournament | Partner | Opponent | Score | Result |
|---|---|---|---|---|---|
| 2008 | Puerto Rico International | (Peru) Antonio de Vinatea | (Mexico) Jesús Aguilar (Mexico) Salvador Sánchez | 21–14, 21–17 | (gold) Winner |
| 2009 | Giraldilla International | (Peru) Antonio de Vinatea | (Indonesia) Rizki Yanu Kresnayandi (Indonesia) Albert Saputra | 10–21, 9–21 | (silver) Runner-up |
| 2009 | Brazil International | (Peru) Antonio de Vinatea | (Peru) Mario Cuba (Peru) Bruno Monteverde | 23–21, 21–12 | (gold) Winner |
| 2014 | Chile International | (Peru) Mario Cuba | (France) Arnaud Génin (United States) Bjorn Seguin | 7–11, 10–11, 11–10, 9–11 | (silver) Runner-up |
| 2014 | Suriname International | (Peru) Mario Cuba | (Suriname) Gilmar Jones (Suriname) Mitchel Wongsodikromo | 21–11, 21–14 | (gold) Winner |
| 2015 | Santo Domingo Open | (Peru) Mario Cuba | (Mexico) Job Castillo (Mexico) Lino Muñoz | 18–21, 26–24, 17–21 | (silver) Runner-up |

Mixed doubles
| Year | Tournament | Partner | Opponent | Score | Result |
|---|---|---|---|---|---|
| 2008 | Miami Pan Am International | (Peru) Katherine Winder | (Peru) Andrés Corpancho (Peru) Cristina Aicardi | 14–21, 21–18, 16–21 | (silver) Runner-up |
| 2008 | Peru International | (Peru) Daniela Cuba | (Peru) Andrés Corpancho (Peru) Cristina Aicardi | 21–15, 15–21, 18–21 | (silver) Runner-up |

BWF International Challenge tournament
BWF International Series tournament
BWF Future Series tournament
