= 2009 Pan Am Badminton Championships =

The XV 2009 Pan Am Badminton Championships were held in Guadalajara, Mexico, between October 20 and October 25, 2009.

This event was part of the 2009 BWF Grand Prix Gold and Grand Prix series of the Badminton World Federation.

== Venue ==
- Coliseo Olímpico de la Universidad de Guadalajara

== Medalists ==
Event	Gold	Silver	Bronze
Men's singles	(Guatemala) Kevin Cordón	(Canada) Stephan Wojcikiewicz	(Canada) Joseph Rogers
Men's singles	(Guatemala) Kevin Cordón	(Canada) Stephan Wojcikiewicz	(Canada) David Snider
Women's singles	(Canada) Anna Rice	(Canada) Joycelin Ko	(Peru) Claudia Rivero
Women's singles	(Canada) Anna Rice	(Canada) Joycelin Ko	(United States) Rena Wang
Men's doubles	(Guatemala) Rodolfo Ramirez and Kevin Cordón	(Peru) Antonio de Vinatea and Martin del Valle	(United States) Matthew Fogarty and David Neumann
Men's doubles	(Guatemala) Rodolfo Ramirez and Kevin Cordón	(Peru) Antonio de Vinatea and Martin del Valle	(Peru) Mario Cuba and Bruno Monteverde
Women's doubles	(Canada) Milaine Cloutier and Valerie St. Jacques	(Canada) Fiona Mckee and Grace Gao	(United States) Iris Wang and Rena Wang
Women's doubles	(Canada) Milaine Cloutier and Valerie St. Jacques	(Canada) Fiona Mckee and Grace Gao	(Peru) Cristina Aicardi and Claudia Rivero
Mixed doubles	(Canada) Toby Ng and Grace Gao	(Canada) Alexander Pang and Joycelin Ko	(United States) Nicholas Jinadasa and Rulan Yeh
Mixed doubles	(Canada) Toby Ng and Grace Gao	(Canada) Alexander Pang and Joycelin Ko	(Canada) Kevin Li and Alexandra Bruce
Teams	Canada	Peru	Mexico
