= Puerto Rico International =

Puerto Rican badminton tournament

The Puerto Rico International is an open badminton tournament held in Puerto Rico, organized by the Badminton Pan Am and Puerto Rico Badminton Federation (Fepurba). The tournament has been an International Series level since 1995, then in 2009–2013 categorized as International Challenge, and in 2014 back to International Series level from Badminton World Federation.

== Previous Winners ==
Year	Men's singles	Women's singles	Men's doubles	Women's doubles	Mixed doubles
1995	(Guatemala) Kenneth Erichsen	(United States) Linda French	(Jamaica) Paul Leyow (Jamaica) Roy Paul Jr.	(United States) Linda French (United States) Kathy Zimmerman	(Jamaica) Paul Leyow (Jamaica) Terry Leyow
1999	(Guatemala) Pedro Yang	(Jamaica) Nigella Saunders	(Jamaica) Roy Paul Jr. (Jamaica) Robert Richards	"no competition"	(Jamaica) Roy Paul Jr. (Jamaica) Nigella Saunders
2001	(Netherlands) Tjitte Weistra	(Italy) Agnese Allegrini	(United States) Cosmin Ioan (Netherlands) Tjitte Weistra	(England) Felicity Gallup (England) Joanne Muggeridge	(Netherlands) Tjitte Weistra (Peru) Lorena Blanco
2002	(Denmark) Peter Rasmussen	(Canada) Denyse Julien	(United States) Tony Gunawan (United States) Khan Malaythong	(England) Felicity Gallup (England) Joanne Muggeridge	(United States) Tony Gunawan (United States) Mesinee Mangkalakiri
2007	(Spain) José Antonio Crespo	(Spain) Lucía Tavera	(Brazil) Guilherme Kumasaka (Brazil) Guilherme Pardo	(United States) Jennifer Coleman (United States) Lauren Todt	(Peru) Andrés Corpancho (Peru) Valeria Rivero
2008	(Guatemala) Kevin Cordón	(Italy) Victoria Montero	(Peru) Antonio de Vinatea (Peru) Martín del Valle	(Peru) Katherine Winder (Peru) Claudia Zornoza	(Peru) Andrés Corpancho (Peru) Katherine Winder
2009	(Guatemala) Kevin Cordón	(Canada) Anna Rice	(Guatemala) Kevin Cordón (Guatemala) Rodolfo Ramírez	(Peru) Christina Aicardi (Peru) Claudia Rivero	(Peru) Bruno Monteverde (Peru) Claudia Zornoza
2010	(Italy) Wisnu Haryo Putro	(Italy) Agnese Allegrini	(Canada) Toby Ng (Canada) Jon Vandervet	(Germany) Nicole Grether (Canada) Charmaine Reid	(United States) Holvy de Pauw (United States) Grace Peng
2011	(Sri Lanka) Niluka Karunaratne	(Canada) Michelle Li	(Canada) Adrian Liu (Canada) Derrick Ng	(Canada) Alex Bruce (Canada) Michelle Li	(Canada) Toby Ng (Canada) Grace Gao
2013	(France) Brice Leverdez	(Brazil) Lohaynny Vicente	(France) Lucas Corvée (France) Brice Leverdez	(Brazil) Paula Pereira (Brazil) Lohaynny Vicente	(Poland) Robert Mateusiak (Poland) Agnieszka Wojtkowska
2014	(Brazil) Ygor Coelho	(Brazil) Fabiana Silva	(Italy) Giovanni Greco (Italy) Rosario Maddaloni	(Brazil) Ana Paula Campos (Brazil) Fabiana Silva	(Peru) Andrés Corpancho (Peru) Luz Maria Zornoza
2015	(Guatemala) Kevin Cordón	(Hungary) Laura Sarosi	(Mexico) Job Castillo (Mexico) Lino Muñoz	(Mexico) Haramara Gaitán (Mexico) Sabrina Solis	(Brazil) Alex Yuwan Tjong (Brazil) Lohaynny Vicente
2016; 2021	not conducted				
