= Fiona McKee =

Canadian badminton player

Personal information
- Born: 16 May 1985 (age 41) Toronto, Ontario, Canada
- Height: 157 cm (5 ft 2 in)
- Weight: 61 kg (134 lb)

Sport
- Country: Canada
- Sport: Badminton

Women's doubles
- Career record: 40 wins, 61 losses
- Highest ranking: 69 (29 October 2009)
Medal record
Badminton
Representing Canada
Pan Am Championships
Gold medal – first place	2007 Calgary	Women's doubles
Gold medal – first place	2008 Lima	Mixed doubles
Silver medal – second place	2008 Lima	Women's doubles
Pan American Games
Silver medal – second place	2007 Rio de Janeiro	Women's doubles

Fiona McKee (born 16 May 1985) is a former Canadian badminton player who competes in international level events. She is a double Pan Am badminton champion has competed in women's doubles with Valerie Loker and Charmaine Reid. She has also competed in the 2007 Pan American Games.
