= Markham Pan Am Centre =

Aquatics centre in Markham, Ontario

Coordinates: 43.85513°N 79.30902°W

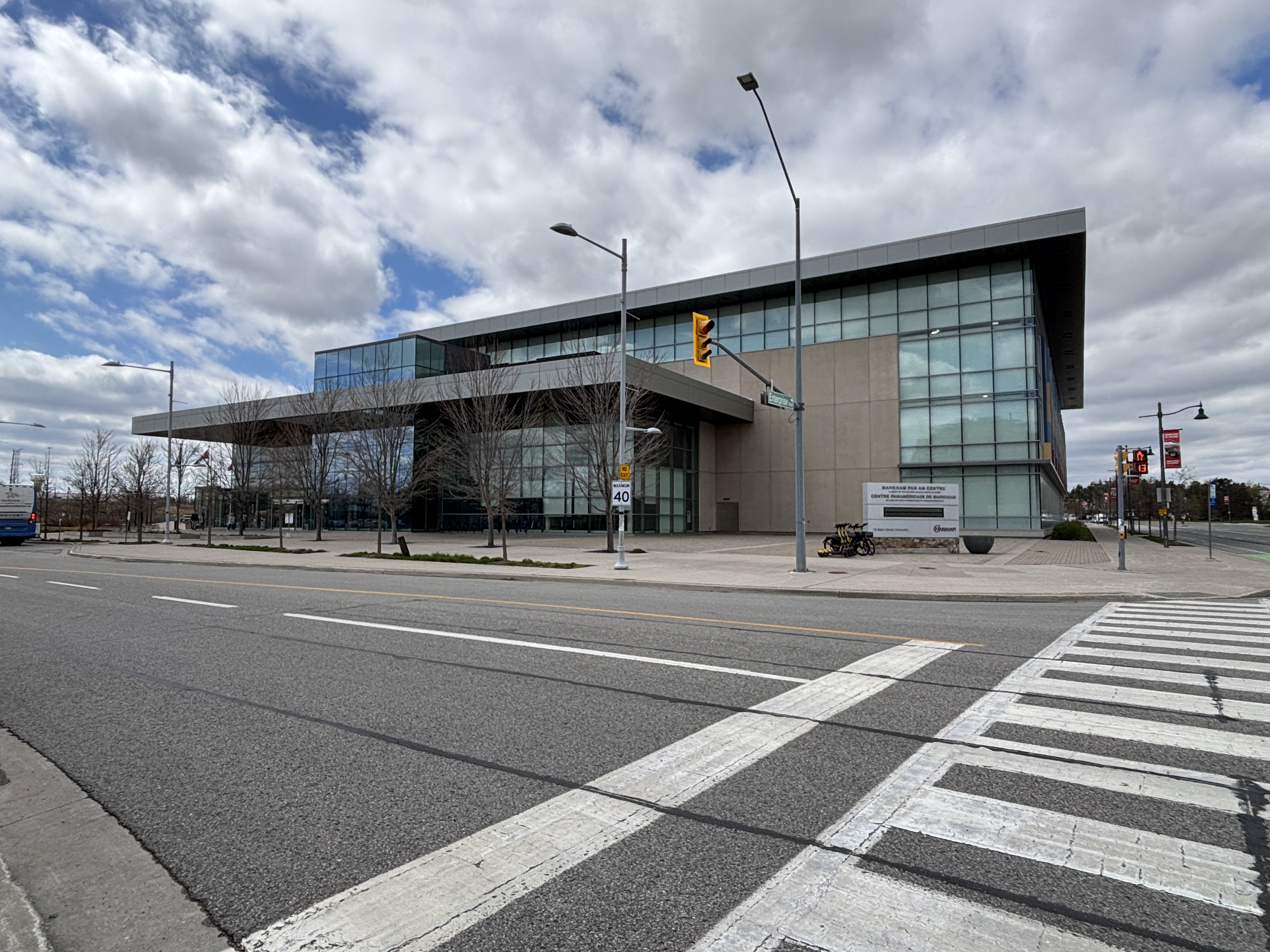
- Interactive map of Markham Pan Am Centre
- Full name: Markham Pan / Parapan American Centre
- Location: 16 Main Street Unionville, Markham, Ontario
- Owner: City of Markham
- Capacity: 2,000

Construction
- Built: 2012-2014
- Opened: November 23, 2014

Tenants
- 2015 Pan American Games; 2015 Parapan American Games

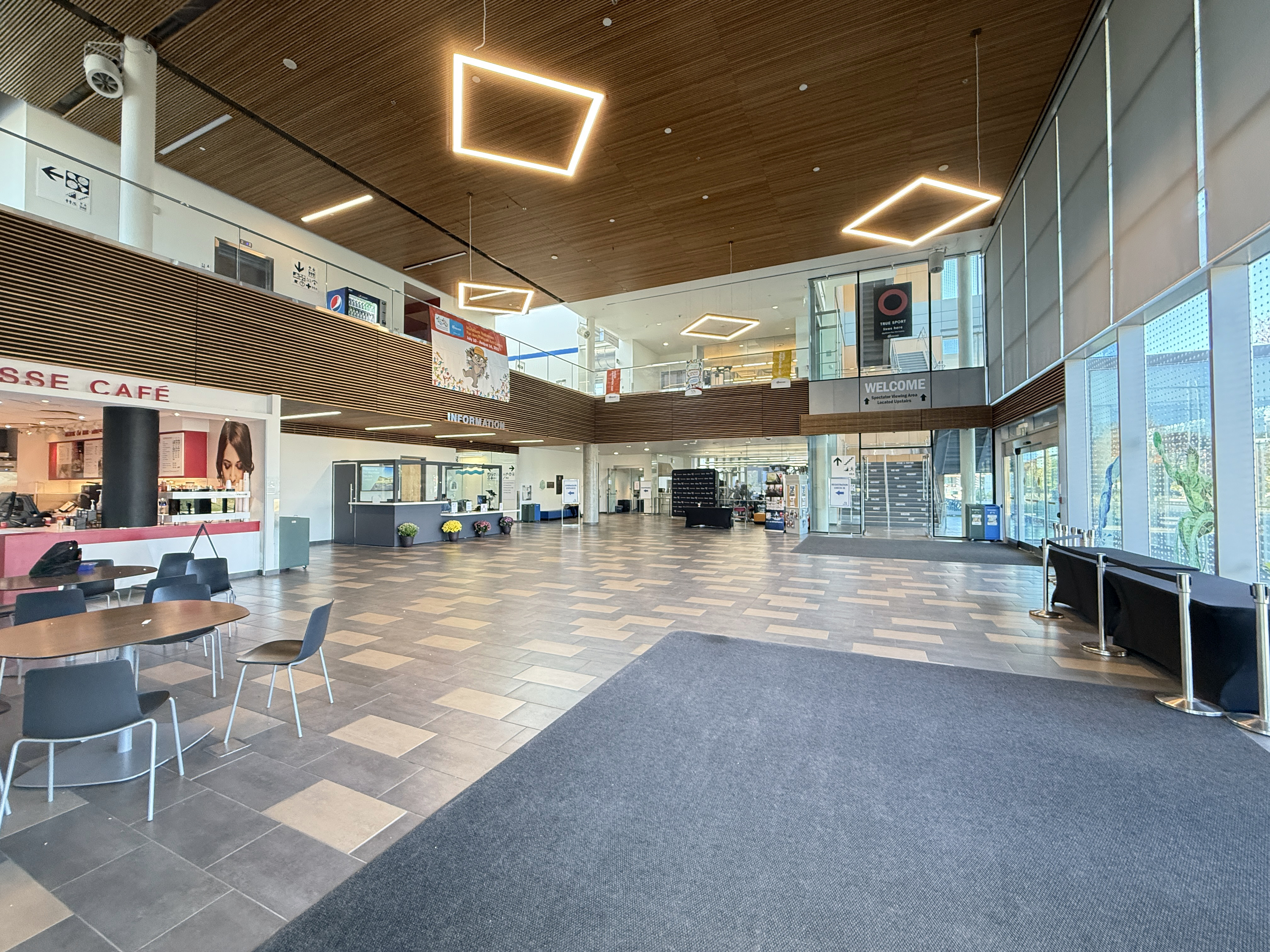
Lobby

The Markham Pan Am Centre is a multi-purpose community and aquatics centre located in the new downtown area of Markham, Ontario, Canada.

The facility was designed to host the badminton, table tennis and water polo events for the 2015 Pan American Games, held in nearby Toronto in July and August, 2015. The venue also hosted the table tennis competition in the 2015 Parapan American Games. During the Pan Am and Parapan American Games the venue was known as the Atos Markham Pan Am / Parapan American Centre. After the 2015 Pan Am Games, the facility continues to be used as a community and competition centre for aquatics, badminton, volleyball, basketball and table tennis for Markham-area residents.

== Design ==
The 13,657 square metre (147,000 sq. foot) multipurpose centre comprises three gymnasiums for training, competition and community use as well as a 10-lane, 50-metre Olympic-size swimming pool. The building became the first venue to be constructed for the 2015 Pan American Games to have its design unveiled and the official ground breaking for the facility was on October 9, 2012. The facility cost roughly $78 million Canadian dollars to be built and had its official opening on November 23, 2014.

The building's triple gymnasium features 12 badminton courts, 6 volleyball, 2 basketball courts, and a 12.5-metre-high (41 ft.) ceiling that meets international BWF and FIVB requirements for height in badminton and volleyball. The warm-up hall adjacent to the main gymnasium features 3 badminton courts, 1 volleyball and 1 basketball court.

The 50-metre pool was designed to meet FINA international and Olympic competition standards, and includes two movable bulkheads (walls) to section the pool into three zones, and permanent seating for 2,000 spectators. Other features include rooms for dance, yoga, and a two-level fitness centre.

== Major competitions hosted ==
=== Badminton ===
Year	Date	Event	Level
2014	October 13-19	2014 Pan Am Badminton Championships	International
2015	July 11-16	2015 Pan American Games - Badminton competition	International
2017	July 21-28	2017 Pan Am Junior Badminton Championships	International
2018	November 5-18	2018 BWF World Junior Championships	International

=== Table Tennis ===
Year	Date	Event	Level
2015	July 19-25	2015 Pan American Games - Table tennis competition	International
2015	August 7-15	2015 Parapan American Games	International
2016	April 8-10	ITTF North America Olympic Qualification Tournament	Continental
2017	October 27-29	2017 ITTF Women's World Cup	International

=== Water Polo ===
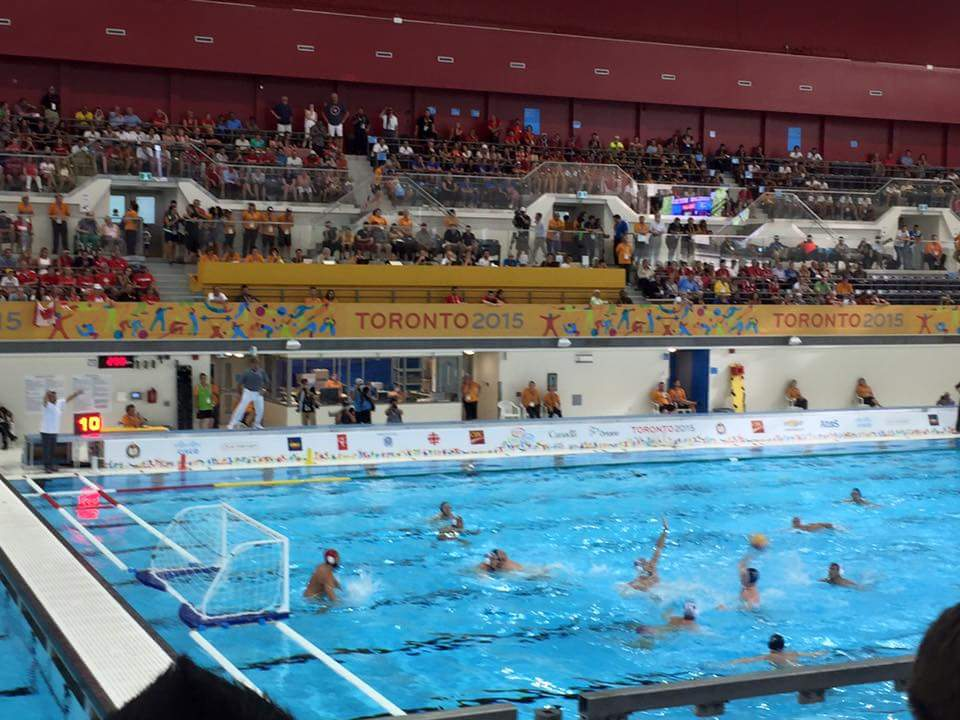
Water polo at the Markham Pan Am Centre during the 2015 Pan Am Games.

Year	Date	Event	Level
2015	January 28 - February 1	UANA Cup - FINA World Championships Qualifier	International
2015	July 7-15	2015 Pan American Games - Water polo competition	International

=== Swimming ===
Year	Date	Event	Level
2016	April 1-3	2016 Ontario Provincial Masters Swimming Championships	Provincial
2025	February 7-9	2025 Ontario University Athletics Swimming Championship	Provincial
2026	March 12-14	2026 U SPORTS Swimming Championship	National

=== Floorball ===
- World Floorball qualifications, 2014

== See also ==
- Venues of the 2015 Pan American and Parapan American Games
- York University - future Markham Campus will be located directly on the west side of the Pan Am Centre
