= Valerie Loker =

Canadian badminton player

Valérie Loker
Personal information
- Nickname: Val
- Born: May 1, 1980 (age 46) Brantford, Ontario
- Height: 1.73 m (5 ft 8 in)
- Weight: 71 kg (157 lb)

Sport
- Country: Canada
- Sport: Badminton
- Coached by: Jean-Paul Girard
- BWF profile
Medal record
Women's badminton
Representing Canada
Pan American Games
Silver medal – second place	2007 Rio de Janeiro	Mixed doubles

Valérie "Val" Loker (born May 1, 1980) is a Canadian badminton player. She won a silver medal, along with her partner Mike Beres in the mixed doubles at the 2007 Pan American Games in Rio de Janeiro, Brazil, against the winning U.S. pair Howard Bach and Eva Lee, with a score of 18–21 and 17–21. Loker is also a member of Club Excellence Yonex Laval in Montreal, Quebec, and is coached and trained by Jean-Paul Girard.

Loker qualified for the mixed doubles at the 2008 Summer Olympics in Beijing, by placing fifteenth and receiving an allocated spot from the Badminton World Federation's ranking list. Playing with three-time Olympian Beres, Loker lost the preliminary round match to Thai pair Sudket Prapakamol and Saralee Thungthongkam, with a score of 9–21 each in two straight periods.
