= 2018 BWF World Tour Finals =

2018 badminton tournament in Guangzhou, China

Tournament details
- Dates: 12–16 December
- Edition: 1st
- Level: World Tour Finals
- Total prize money: US$1,500,000
- Venue: Tianhe Gymnasium
- Location: Tianhe, Guangzhou, China

Champions
- Men's singles: (China) Shi Yuqi
- Women's singles: (India) P. V. Sindhu
- Men's doubles: (China) Li Junhui (China) Liu Yuchen
- Women's doubles: (Japan) Misaki Matsutomo (Japan) Ayaka Takahashi
- Mixed doubles: (China) Wang Yilyu (China) Huang Dongping

The 2018 BWF World Tour Finals (officially known as the HSBC BWF World Tour Finals 2018 for sponsorship reasons) was the final tournament of the 2018 BWF World Tour. It was held from 12 to 16 December 2018 in Guangzhou, China and had a total prize of $1,500,000.

== Tournament ==
The 2018 BWF World Tour was the first edition of the BWF World Tour Finals and was organized by the Guangzhou Sports Bureau, Guangzhou Sports Competitions Centre, Guangzhou Badminton Administrative Centre, and Guangzhou Badminton Association. It was hosted by the Chinese Badminton Association and Guangzhou Municipal Government with sanction from the BWF.

=== Venue ===
This international tournament was held at the Tianhe Gymnasium in Tianhe, Guangzhou, China.

=== Point distribution ===
Below is the point distribution table for each phase of the tournament based on the BWF points system for the BWF World Tour Finals event.

Winner	Runner-up	3/4	3rd in Group	4th in Group
12,000	10,200	8,400	6,600	4,800

=== Prize money ===
The total prize money for this year's tournament was US$1,500,000. Distribution of prize money was in accordance with BWF regulations.

Achievement	Winner(s)	Runner(s)-up	Semi-finalist(s)	3rd in group	4th in group
Singles	$120,000	$60,000	$30,000	$16,500	$9,000
Doubles	$126,000	$60,000	$30,000	$19,500	$10,500

== Representatives ==
=== Eligible players ===
Below are the eligible players for World Tour Finals. Rankings used are accurate as of 29 November 2018.

==== Men's singles ====
Seeds	Rank	NOCs	Players	Performances		
Seeds	Rank	NOCs	Players	Winner	Runner-up	Semifinalists
1	1	Chinese Taipei (1)	Chou Tien-chen	3 Super 500: Singapore Open, Korea Open; Super 300: German Open	3 Super 750: Denmark Open, Fuzhou China Open; Super 500: India Open	3 Super 1000: China Open; Super 500: Indonesia Masters; Super 300: Chinese Taipei Open
2	2	Japan (1)	Kento Momota	4 Super 1000: Indonesia Open; Super 750: Japan Open, Denmark Open, Fuzhou China Open	2 Super 1000: China Open; Super 750: Malaysia Open	2 Super 750: French Open; Super 500: Hong Kong Open
3/4	3	Indonesia (1)	Tommy Sugiarto	1 Super 300: Thailand Masters	2 Super 500: Thailand Open, Korea Open	1 Super 750: Malaysia Open
3/4	4	China (1)	Shi Yuqi	2 Super 1000: All England Open; Super 500: India Open	2 Super 1000: Indonesia Open; Super 750: French Open	3 Super 1000: China Open; Super 750: Fuzhou China Open; Super 300: German Open
	5	South Korea (1)	Son Wan-ho	2 Super 500: Hong Kong Open; Super 300: Korea Masters		2 Super 1000: All England Open; Super 500: Indonesia Masters
	6	Thailand (1)	Kantaphon Wangcharoen			2 Super 300: Thailand Masters, Swiss Open
	7	India (1)	Sameer Verma	2 Super 300: Swiss Open, Syed Modi International		
	8	Indonesia (2)	Anthony Sinisuka Ginting	2 Super 1000: China Open; Super 500: Indonesia Masters		

==== Women's singles ====
Seeds	Rank	NOCs	Players	Performances		
Seeds	Rank	NOCs	Players	Winner	Runner-up	Semifinalists
1	1	Chinese Taipei (1)	Tai Tzu-ying	6 Super 1000: All England Open, Indonesia Open; Super 750: Malaysia Open, Denmark Open; Super 500: Indonesia Masters; Super 300: Chinese Taipei Open	2 Super 750: French Open; Super 500: Malaysia Masters	1 Super 500: Hong Kong Open
2	2	Japan (1)	Nozomi Okuhara	3 Super 500: Thailand Open, Korea Open, Hong Kong Open	2 Super 750: Japan Open, Fuzhou China Open	2 Super 1000: China Open; Super 300: German Open
3/4	3	Japan (2)	Akane Yamaguchi	2 Super 750: French Open; Super 300: German Open	1 Super 1000: All England Open	3 Super 1000: China Open; Super 500: Malaysia Masters, Korea Open
3/4	4	China (1)	Chen Yufei	1 Super 750: Fuzhou China Open	3 Super 1000: Indonesia Open, China Open; Super 300: German Open	3 Super 1000: All England Open; Super 750: Japan Open, French Open
	5	Thailand (1)	Ratchanok Intanon	1 Super 500: Malaysia Masters	1 Super 500: Hong Kong Open	3 Super 750: Malaysia Open; Super 500: Indonesia Masters, India Open
	6	India (1)	P. V. Sindhu		2 Super 500: India Open, Thailand Open	2 Super 1000: All England Open; Super 750: Malaysia Open
	8	Canada (1)	Michelle Li	1 Super 300: Macau Open		1 Super 300: U.S. Open
	11	United States (1)	Beiwen Zhang	1 Super 500: India Open	2 Super 500: Korea Open; Super 300: U.S. Open	1 Super 500: Thailand Open

==== Men's doubles ====
Seeds	Rank	NOCs	Players	Performances		
Seeds	Rank	NOCs	Players	Winner	Runner-up	Semifinalists
1	1	Indonesia (1)	Marcus Fernaldi Gideon; Kevin Sanjaya Sukamuljo	8 Super 1000: All England Open, Indonesia Open; Super 750: Japan Open, Denmark Open, Fuzhou China Open; Super 500: Indonesia Masters, India Open, Hong Kong Open	1 Super 750: French Open	1 Super 1000: China Open
2	2	Chinese Taipei (1)	Chen Hung-ling; Wang Chi-lin	2 Super 300: New Zealand Open, Chinese Taipei Open		3 Super 1000: China Open; Super 750: Japan Open; Super 500: Malaysia Masters
3/4	3	Chinese Taipei (2)	Liao Min-chun; Su Ching-heng		1 Super 300: Chinese Taipei Open	1 Super 1000: Indonesia Open
3/4	4	China (1)	Han Chengkai; Zhou Haodong	1 Super 750: French Open	1 Super 1000: China Open	2 Super 500: India Open, Singapore Open
	5	Denmark (1)	Kim Astrup; Anders Skaarup Rasmussen	1 Super 1000: China Open	1 Super 500: India Open	
	6	Indonesia (2)	Mohammad Ahsan; Hendra Setiawan	1 Super 500: Singapore Open		5 Super 750: Denmark Open, Fuzhou China Open; Super 500: India Open, Hong Kong Open; Super 300: German Open
	7	Japan (1)	Hiroyuki Endo; Yuta Watanabe	1 Super 500: Korea Open	2 Super 750: Malaysia Open; Super 500: Thailand Open	1 Super 1000: All England Open
	10	China (2)	Li Junhui; Liu Yuchen		2 Super 750: Japan Open; Super 500: Indonesia Masters	1 Super 750: Malaysia Open

==== Women's doubles ====
Seeds	Rank	NOCs	Players	Performances		
Seeds	Rank	NOCs	Players	Winner	Runner-up	Semifinalists
1	1	Japan (1)	Misaki Matsutomo; Ayaka Takahashi	4 Super 1000: China Open; Super 750: Malaysia Open; Super 500: Indonesia Masters, Korea Open	1 Super 500: Thailand Open	2 Super 1000: Indonesia Open; Super 750: Fuzhou China Open
2	3	Japan (2)	Mayu Matsumoto; Wakana Nagahara	1 Super 750: French Open	3 Super 1000: Indonesia Open, China Open; Super 750: Fuzhou China Open	2 Super 1000: All England Open; Super 300: 2018 Spain Masters
3/4	4	Indonesia (1)	Greysia Polii; Apriyani Rahayu	2 Super 500: India Open, Thailand Open	1 Super 500: Indonesia Masters	5 Super 1000: China Open; Super 750: Japan Open, Denmark Open, French Open; Super 500: Hong Kong Open
3/4	5	Thailand (1)	Jongkolphan Kititharakul; Rawinda Prajongjai	1 Super 300: Thailand Masters	1 Super 500: India Open	2 Super 500: Thailand Open, Singapore Open
	6	South Korea (1)	Lee So-hee; Shin Seung-chan	1 Super 750: Fuzhou China Open	2 Super 500: Hong Kong Open; Super 300: Korea Masters	3 Super 750: French Open; Super 500: Malaysia Masters, Indonesia Masters
	7	Bulgaria (1)	Gabriela Stoeva; Stefani Stoeva		2 Super 750: French Open; Super 300: Swiss Open	2 Super 1000: China Open; Super 300: German Open
	8	China (1)	Chen Qingchen; Jia Yifan		3 Super 750: Malaysia Open, Japan Open; Super 500: Malaysia Masters	1 Super 1000: Indonesia Open
	11	China (2)	Du Yue; Li Yinhui			2 Super 750: Japan Open; Super 500: India Open

==== Mixed doubles ====
Seeds	Rank	NOCs	Players	Performances		
Seeds	Rank	NOCs	Players	Winner	Runner-up	Semifinalists
1	1	China (1)	Zheng Siwei; Huang Yaqiong	7 Super 1000: China Open; Super 750: Malaysia Open, Japan Open, Denmark Open, French Open, Fuzhou China Open; Super 500: Indonesia Masters	2 Super 1000: All England Open; Super 500: Malaysia Masters	1 Super 1000: Indonesia Open
2	2	Japan (1)	Yuta Watanabe; Arisa Higashino	1 Super 1000: All England Open		5 Super 750: Malaysia Open, Japan Open, French Open, Fuzhou China Open; Super 500: Hong Kong Open
3/4	3	Thailand (1)	Dechapol Puavaranukroh; Sapsiree Taerattanachai		2 Super 750: Denmark Open; Super 300: Thailand Masters	5 Super 750: French Open; Super 500: Singapore Open, Korea Open, Hong Kong Open; Super 300: New Zealand Open
3/4	4	Malaysia (1)	Chan Peng Soon; Goh Liu Ying	2 Super 300: Thailand Masters, U.S. Open	2 Super 1000: Indonesia Open; Super 300: Australian Open	1 Super 750: Japan Open
	5	China (2)	Wang Yilyu; Huang Dongping		3 Super 750: Malaysia Open, Japan Open, Fuzhou China Open	2 Super 1000: China Open; Super 500: Hong Kong Open
	6	Indonesia (1)	Hafiz Faizal; Gloria Emanuelle Widjaja	1 Super 500: Thailand Open		2 Super 1000: Indonesia Open; Super 500: Malaysia Masters
	7	Malaysia (2)	Goh Soon Huat; Shevon Jemie Lai	2 Super 500: Singapore Open; Super 300: German Open		2 Super 500: Malaysia Masters, Indonesia Masters
	8	England (1)	Marcus Ellis; Lauren Smith		2 Super 300: Swiss Open, Spain Masters	

- Notes: In the women's singles, the 7th-ranked Carolina Marín, who received the wild cards as the women's singles world champion, withdrew from the competition due to injury. The player next in line, He Bingjiao could not fulfill the invitation due to injury as well.

=== Representatives by nation ===
Top Nations
Rank	Nation	MS	WS	MD	WD	XD	Total	Players
1	China	1	1	2	2	2	8	14
2	Japan	1	2	1	2	1	7	10^{§}
3	Indonesia	2		2	1	1	6	10
4	Chinese Taipei	1	1	2			4	6
4	Thailand	1	1		1	1	4	6
6	Malaysia					2	2	4
7	South Korea	1			1		2	3
8	India	1	1				2	2
9	Bulgaria				1		1	2
9	Denmark			1			1	2
9	England					1	1	2
12	Canada		1				1	1
12	United States		1				1	1
Total		8	8	8	8	8	40	63

§: Yuta Watanabe from Japan was the only player who played in two categories (men's doubles and mixed doubles).

== Performances by nation ==
Nation	Group stage	Semi-finals	Final	Winner(s)
China	8	5	4	3
Japan	7	7	4	1
Indonesia	6			
Chinese Taipei	4	1		
Thailand	4	2		
India	2	2	1	1
Malaysia	2			
South Korea	2	2	1	
Bulgaria	1			
Canada	1			
Denmark	1	1		
England	1			
United States	1			
Total	40	20	10	5

== Men's singles ==
=== Group A ===
Rank	Players	Pts	Pld	W	L	SF	SA	PF	PA
1	(China) Shi Yuqi	3	3	3	0	6	1	142	111
2	(South Korea) Son Wan-ho	2	3	2	1	5	3	150	125
3	(Chinese Taipei) Chou Tien-chen	1	3	1	2	3	5	141	159
4	(Indonesia) Anthony Sinisuka Ginting	0	3	0	3	1	6	105	143

Date		Score		Set 1	Set 2	Set 3
12 Dec	Shi Yuqi (China)	2–1	(South Korea) Son Wan-ho	16–21	21–19	21–8
12 Dec	Chou Tien-chen (Chinese Taipei)	2–1	(Indonesia) Anthony Sinisuka Ginting	17–21	21–18	21–18
13 Dec	Shi Yuqi (China)	2–0	(Indonesia) Anthony Sinisuka Ginting	21–8	21–19	
13 Dec	Chou Tien-chen (Chinese Taipei)	1–2	(South Korea) Son Wan-ho	21–18	11–21	14–21
14 Dec	Son Wan-ho (South Korea)	2–0	(Indonesia) Anthony Sinisuka Ginting	21–11	21–10	
14 Dec	Chou Tien-chen (Chinese Taipei)	0–2	(China) Shi Yuqi	17–21	19–21	

=== Group B ===
Rank	Players	Pts	Pld	W	L	SF	SA	PF	PA
1	(Japan) Kento Momota	3	3	3	0	6	0	126	68
2	(India) Sameer Verma	2	3	2	1	4	2	108	92
3	(Indonesia) Tommy Sugiarto	1	3	1	2	2	5	105	134
4	(Thailand) Kantaphon Wangcharoen	0	3	0	3	1	6	99	144

Date		Score		Set 1	Set 2	Set 3
12 Dec	Kento Momota (Japan)	2–0	(India) Sameer Verma	21–18	21–6	
12 Dec	Tommy Sugiarto (Indonesia)	2–1	(Thailand) Kantaphon Wangcharoen	21–18	18–21	21–11
13 Dec	Tommy Sugiarto (Indonesia)	0–2	(India) Sameer Verma	16–21	7–21	
13 Dec	Kento Momota (Japan)	2–0	(Thailand) Kantaphon Wangcharoen	21–15	21–7	
14 Dec	Kantaphon Wangcharoen (Thailand)	0–2	(India) Sameer Verma	9–21	18–21	
14 Dec	Kento Momota (Japan)	2–0	(Indonesia) Tommy Sugiarto	21–14	21–8	

=== Finals ===
Semi-finals
3/4	(China) Shi Yuqi	12	22	21
(India) Sameer Verma	21	20	17
(South Korea) Son Wan-ho	14	12
2	(Japan) Kento Momota	21	21

Final
3/4	(China) Shi Yuqi	21	21
2	(Japan) Kento Momota	12	11

== Women's singles ==
=== Group A ===
Rank	Players	Pts	Pld	W	L	SF	SA	PF	PA
1	(India) P. V. Sindhu	2	2	2	0	4	0	87	61
2	(Japan) Akane Yamaguchi	1	2	1	1	2	2	79	65
3	(United States) Beiwen Zhang	0	2	0	2	0	4	44	84
N/A	(Chinese Taipei) Tai Tzu-ying	Retired							

Date		Score		Set 1	Set 2	Set 3
12 Dec	Akane Yamaguchi (Japan)	0–2	(India) P. V. Sindhu	22–24	15–21	
12 Dec	Tai Tzu-ying (Chinese Taipei)	~~2–0~~	(United States) Beiwen Zhang	~~21–15~~	~~21–17~~	
13 Dec	Tai Tzu-ying (Chinese Taipei)	~~1–2~~	(India) P. V. Sindhu	~~21–14~~	~~16–21~~	~~18–21~~
13 Dec	Akane Yamaguchi (Japan)	2–0	(United States) Beiwen Zhang	21–10	21–10	
14 Dec	P. V. Sindhu (India)	2–0	(United States) Beiwen Zhang	21–9	21–15	
14 Dec	Tai Tzu-ying (Chinese Taipei)	Retired	(Japan) Akane Yamaguchi	~~17–21~~	12–11^{r}	

=== Group B ===
Rank	Players	Pts	Pld	W	L	SF	SA	PF	PA
1	(Japan) Nozomi Okuhara	2	2	2	0	4	1	100	85
2	(Thailand) Ratchanok Intanon	1	2	1	1	3	2	88	81
3	(Canada) Michelle Li	0	2	0	2	0	4	64	86
N/A	(China) Chen Yufei	Retired							

Date		Score		Set 1	Set 2	Set 3
12 Dec	Chen Yufei (China)	~~1–2~~	(Thailand) Ratchanok Intanon	~~18–21~~	~~22–20~~	~~17–21~~
12 Dec	Nozomi Okuhara (Japan)	2–0	(Canada) Michelle Li	21–18	23–21	
13 Dec	Chen Yufei (China)	~~1–2~~	(Canada) Michelle Li	~~21–16~~	~~18–21~~	~~17–21~~
13 Dec	Nozomi Okuhara (Japan)	2–1	(Thailand) Ratchanok Intanon	14–21	21–11	21–14
14 Dec	Ratchanok Intanon (Thailand)	2–0	(Canada) Michelle Li	21–13	21–12	
14 Dec	Nozomi Okuhara (Japan)	Retired	(China) Chen Yufei	5–4^{r}		

=== Finals ===
Semi-finals
(India) P. V. Sindhu	21	25
(Thailand) Ratchanok Intanon	16	23
3/4	(Japan) Akane Yamaguchi	17	14
2	(Japan) Nozomi Okuhara	21	21

Final
(India) P. V. Sindhu	21	21
2	(Japan) Nozomi Okuhara	19	17

== Men's doubles ==
=== Group A ===
Rank	Players	Pts	Pld	W	L	SF	SA	PF	PA
1	(China) Li Junhui (China) Liu Yuchen	2	2	2	0	4	2	128	111
2	(Denmark) Kim Astrup (Denmark) Anders Skaarup Rasmussen	1	2	1	1	3	2	95	96
3	(China) Han Chengkai (China) Zhou Haodong	0	2	0	2	1	4	94	110
N/A	(Indonesia) Marcus Fernaldi Gideon (Indonesia) Kevin Sanjaya Sukamuljo	Retired							

Date		Score		Set 1	Set 2	Set 3
12 Dec	Marcus Fernaldi Gideon (Indonesia); Kevin Sanjaya Sukamuljo (Indonesia)	~~2–1~~	(Denmark) Kim Astrup (Denmark) Anders Skaarup Rasmussen	~~20–22~~	~~21–17~~	~~21–13~~
12 Dec	Han Chengkai (China); Zhou Haodong (China)	1–2	(China) Li Junhui (China) Liu Yuchen	17–21	28–26	13–21
13 Dec	Han Chengkai (China); Zhou Haodong (China)	0–2	(Denmark) Kim Astrup (Denmark) Anders Skaarup Rasmussen	17–21	19–21	
13 Dec	Marcus Fernaldi Gideon (Indonesia); Kevin Sanjaya Sukamuljo (Indonesia)	~~0–2~~	(China) Li Junhui (China) Liu Yuchen	~~18–21~~	~~22–24~~	
14 Dec	Marcus Fernaldi Gideon (Indonesia); Kevin Sanjaya Sukamuljo (Indonesia)	Walkover	(China) Han Chengkai (China) Zhou Haodong	Walkover		
14 Dec	Kim Astrup (Denmark); Anders Skaarup Rasmussen (Denmark)	1–2	(China) Li Junhui (China) Liu Yuchen	21–18	15–21	17–21

=== Group B ===
Rank	Players	Pts	Pld	W	L	SF	SA	PF	PA
1	(Japan) Hiroyuki Endo (Japan) Yuta Watanabe	2	3	2	1	5	2	139	113
2	(Chinese Taipei) Chen Hung-ling (Chinese Taipei) Wang Chi-lin	2	3	2	1	4	3	135	128
3	(Indonesia) Mohammad Ahsan (Indonesia) Hendra Setiawan	1	3	1	2	3	4	117	129
4	(Chinese Taipei) Liao Min-chun (Chinese Taipei) Su Ching-heng	1	3	1	2	2	5	118	139

Date		Score		Set 1	Set 2	Set 3
12 Dec	Mohammad Ahsan (Indonesia); Hendra Setiawan (Indonesia)	0–2	(Japan) Hiroyuki Endo (Japan) Yuta Watanabe	4–21	18–21	
12 Dec	Chen Hung-ling (Chinese Taipei); Wang Chi-lin (Chinese Taipei)	2–0	(Chinese Taipei) Liao Min-chun (Chinese Taipei) Su Ching-heng	21–17	21–16	
13 Dec	Liao Min-chun (Chinese Taipei); Su Ching-heng (Chinese Taipei)	0–2	(Indonesia) Mohammad Ahsan (Indonesia) Hendra Setiawan	18–21	14–21	
13 Dec	Chen Hung-ling (Chinese Taipei); Wang Chi-lin (Chinese Taipei)	0–2	(Japan) Hiroyuki Endo (Japan) Yuta Watanabe	19–21	19–21	
14 Dec	Liao Min-chun (Chinese Taipei); Su Ching-heng (Chinese Taipei)	2–1	(Japan) Hiroyuki Endo (Japan) Yuta Watanabe	11–21	21–17	21–17
14 Dec	Chen Hung-ling (Chinese Taipei); Wang Chi-lin (Chinese Taipei)	2–1	(Indonesia) Mohammad Ahsan (Indonesia) Hendra Setiawan	13–21	21–18	21–14

=== Finals ===
Semi-finals
(China) Li Junhui (China) Liu Yuchen	18	21	21
2	(Chinese Taipei) Chen Hung-ling (Chinese Taipei) Wang Chi-lin	21	12	15
(Denmark) Kim Astrup (Denmark) Anders Skaarup Rasmussen	19	13
(Japan) Hiroyuki Endo (Japan) Yuta Watanabe	21	21

Final
(China) Li Junhui (China) Liu Yuchen	21	21
(Japan) Hiroyuki Endo (Japan) Yuta Watanabe	15	11

== Women's doubles ==
=== Group A ===
Rank	Players	Pts	Pld	W	L	SF	SA	PF	PA
1	(Japan) Misaki Matsutomo (Japan) Ayaka Takahashi	3	3	3	0	6	1	145	109
2	(China) Du Yue (China) Li Yinhui	2	3	2	1	4	2	112	101
3	(China) Chen Qingchen (China) Jia Yifan	1	3	1	2	3	4	130	125
4	(Indonesia) Greysia Polii (Indonesia) Apriyani Rahayu	0	3	0	3	0	6	74	126

Date		Score		Set 1	Set 2	Set 3
12 Dec	Chen Qingchen (China); Jia Yifan (China)	0–2	(China) Du Yue (China) Li Yinhui	19–21	15–21	
12 Dec	Misaki Matsutomo (Japan); Ayaka Takahashi (Japan)	2–0	(Indonesia) Greysia Polii (Indonesia) Apriyani Rahayu	21–11	21–16	
13 Dec	Greysia Polii (Indonesia); Apriyani Rahayu (Indonesia)	0–2	(China) Chen Qingchen (China) Jia Yifan	14–21	8–21	
13 Dec	Misaki Matsutomo (Japan); Ayaka Takahashi (Japan)	2–0	(China) Du Yue (China) Li Yinhui	21–9	21–19	
14 Dec	Misaki Matsutomo (Japan); Ayaka Takahashi (Japan)	2–1	(China) Chen Qingchen (China) Jia Yifan	19–21	21–19	21–14
14 Dec	Greysia Polii (Indonesia); Apriyani Rahayu (Indonesia)	0–2	(China) Du Yue (China) Li Yinhui	18–21	7–21	

=== Group B ===
Rank	Players	Pts	Pld	W	L	SF	SA	PF	PA
1	(Japan) Mayu Matsumoto (Japan) Wakana Nagahara	3	3	3	0	6	1	146	95
2	(South Korea) Lee So-hee (South Korea) Shin Seung-chan	2	3	2	1	5	3	155	128
3	(Thailand) Jongkolphan Kititharakul (Thailand) Rawinda Prajongjai	1	3	1	2	2	4	81	118
4	(Bulgaria) Gabriela Stoeva (Bulgaria) Stefani Stoeva	0	3	0	3	1	6	104	140

Date		Score		Set 1	Set 2	Set 3
12 Dec	Mayu Matsumoto (Japan); Wakana Nagahara (Japan)	2–0	(Bulgaria) Gabriela Stoeva (Bulgaria) Stefani Stoeva	21–10	21–16	
12 Dec	Jongkolphan Kititharakul (Thailand); Rawinda Prajongjai (Thailand)	0–2	(South Korea) Lee So-hee (South Korea) Shin Seung-chan	14–21	8–21	
13 Dec	Mayu Matsumoto (Japan); Wakana Nagahara (Japan)	2–1	(South Korea) Lee So-hee (South Korea) Shin Seung-chan	21–18	20–22	21–17
13 Dec	Jongkolphan Kititharakul (Thailand); Rawinda Prajongjai (Thailand)	2–0	(Bulgaria) Gabriela Stoeva (Bulgaria) Stefani Stoeva	21–16	21–18	
14 Dec	Mayu Matsumoto (Japan); Wakana Nagahara (Japan)	2–0	(Thailand) Jongkolphan Kititharakul (Thailand) Rawinda Prajongjai	21–5	21–12	
14 Dec	Lee So-hee (South Korea); Shin Seung-chan (South Korea)	2–1	(Bulgaria) Gabriela Stoeva (Bulgaria) Stefani Stoeva	21–14	14–21	21–9

=== Finals ===
Semi-finals
1	(Japan) Misaki Matsutomo (Japan) Ayaka Takahashi	22	11
(China) Du Yue (China) Li Yinhui	20	3^{r}
(South Korea) Lee So-hee (South Korea) Shin Seung-chan	21	21
2	(Japan) Mayu Matsumoto (Japan) Wakana Nagahara	13	13

Final
1	(Japan) Misaki Matsutomo (Japan) Ayaka Takahashi	21	22
(South Korea) Lee So-hee (South Korea) Shin Seung-chan	12	20

== Mixed doubles ==
=== Group A ===
Rank	Players	Pts	Pld	W	L	SF	SA	PF	PA
1	(China) Zheng Siwei (China) Huang Yaqiong	3	3	3	0	6	0	126	88
2	(Thailand) Dechapol Puavaranukroh (Thailand) Sapsiree Taerattanachai	2	3	2	1	4	2	111	106
3	(England) Marcus Ellis (England) Lauren Smith	1	3	1	2	2	5	131	140
4	(Malaysia) Goh Soon Huat (Malaysia) Shevon Jemie Lai	0	3	0	3	1	6	113	147

Date		Score		Set 1	Set 2	Set 3
12 Dec	Zheng Siwei (China); Huang Yaqiong (China)	2–0	(England) Marcus Ellis (England) Lauren Smith	21–16	21–17	
12 Dec	Dechapol Puavaranukroh (Thailand); Sapsiree Taerattanachai (Thailand)	2–0	(Malaysia) Goh Soon Huat (Malaysia) Shevon Jemie Lai	21–19	21–10	
13 Dec	Zheng Siwei (China); Huang Yaqiong (China)	2–0	(Malaysia) Goh Soon Huat (Malaysia) Shevon Jemie Lai	21–16	21–12	
13 Dec	Dechapol Puavaranukroh (Thailand); Sapsiree Taerattanachai (Thailand)	2–0	(England) Marcus Ellis (England) Lauren Smith	21–16	21–19	
14 Dec	Goh Soon Huat (Malaysia); Shevon Jemie Lai (Malaysia)	1–2	(England) Marcus Ellis (England) Lauren Smith	20–22	22–20	14–21
14 Dec	Zheng Siwei (China); Huang Yaqiong (China)	2–0	(Thailand) Dechapol Puavaranukroh (Thailand) Sapsiree Taerattanachai	21–19	21–8	

=== Group B ===
Rank	Players	Pts	Pld	W	L	SF	SA	PF	PA
1	(China) Wang Yilyu (China) Huang Dongping	3	3	3	0	6	0	127	88
2	(Japan) Yuta Watanabe (Japan) Arisa Higashino	1	3	1	2	3	4	125	127
3	(Malaysia) Chan Peng Soon (Malaysia) Goh Liu Ying	1	3	1	2	2	4	102	111
4	(Indonesia) Hafiz Faizal (Indonesia) Gloria Emanuelle Widjaja	1	3	1	2	2	5	113	141

Date		Score		Set 1	Set 2	Set 3
12 Dec	Yuta Watanabe (Japan); Arisa Higashino (Japan)	1–2	(Indonesia) Hafiz Faizal (Indonesia) Gloria Emanuelle Widjaja	18–21	21–16	18–21
12 Dec	Chan Peng Soon (Malaysia); Goh Liu Ying (Malaysia)	0–2	(China) Wang Yilyu (China) Huang Dongping	20–22	13–21	
13 Dec	Yuta Watanabe (Japan); Arisa Higashino (Japan)	0–2	(China) Wang Yilyu (China) Huang Dongping	12–21	14–21	
13 Dec	Chan Peng Soon (Malaysia); Goh Liu Ying (Malaysia)	2–0	(Indonesia) Hafiz Faizal (Indonesia) Gloria Emanuelle Widjaja	21–14	21–12	
14 Dec	Yuta Watanabe (Japan); Arisa Higashino (Japan)	2–0	(Malaysia) Chan Peng Soon (Malaysia) Goh Liu Ying	21–9	21–18	
14 Dec	Wang Yilyu (China); Huang Dongping (China)	2–0	(Indonesia) Hafiz Faizal (Indonesia) Gloria Emanuelle Widjaja	21–16	21–13	

=== Finals ===
Semi-finals
1	(China) Zheng Siwei (China) Huang Yaqiong	19	21	21
3/4	(Thailand) Dechapol Puavaranukroh (Thailand) Sapsiree Taerattanachai	21	14	12
2	(Japan) Yuta Watanabe (Japan) Arisa Higashino	9	21	13
(China) Wang Yilyu (China) Huang Dongping	21	19	21

Final
1	(China) Zheng Siwei (China) Huang Yaqiong	21	21	18
(China) Wang Yilyu (China) Huang Dongping	23	16	21

Preceded by 2018 Korea Masters	BWF World Tour; 2018 BWF season	Succeeded by 2019 Thailand Masters
