= Michelle Li =

Canadian badminton player (born 1991)

Michelle Li 李文珊
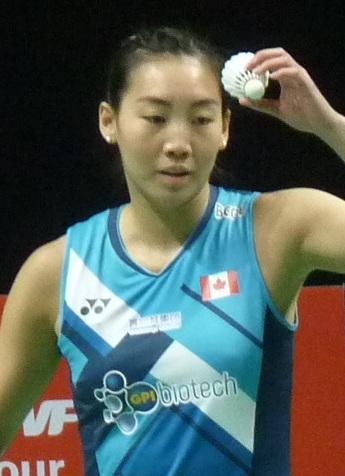
- Li at the 2022 German Open

Personal information
- Born: Michelle Li Man-shan; November 3, 1991 (age 35) Hong Kong
- Years active: 2010–present
- Height: 173 cm (5 ft 8 in)
- Weight: 66 kg (146 lb)

Sport
- Country: Canada
- Sport: Badminton
- Handedness: Right
- Coached by: Jennifer Lee; Mike Butler

Women's singles
- Career record: 428 wins, 221 losses
- Highest ranking: 8 (22 October 2019)
- Current ranking: 16 (10 November 2026)
- BWF profile
Medal record
Women's badminton
Representing Canada
Commonwealth Games
Gold medal – first place	2014 Glasgow	Women's singles
Silver medal – second place	2022 Birmingham	Women's singles
Pan American Games
Gold medal – first place	2011 Guadalajara	Women's singles
Gold medal – first place	2011 Guadalajara	Women's doubles
Gold medal – first place	2015 Toronto	Women's singles
Gold medal – first place	2019 Lima	Women's singles
Bronze medal – third place	2015 Toronto	Women's doubles
Pan Am Championships
Gold medal – first place	2013 Santo Domingo	Women's singles
Gold medal – first place	2014 Markham	Women's singles
Gold medal – first place	2018 Guatemala City	Women's singles
Gold medal – first place	2019 Aguascalientes	Women's singles
Gold medal – first place	2022 San Salvador	Women's singles
Gold medal – first place	2023 Kingston	Women's singles
Gold medal – first place	2026 Lima	Women's singles
Silver medal – second place	2010 Curitiba	Women's singles
Silver medal – second place	2010 Curitiba	Women's doubles
Silver medal – second place	2024 Guatemala City	Women's singles
Bronze medal – third place	2008 Lima	Mixed doubles
Bronze medal – third place	2013 Santo Domingo	Women's doubles
Bronze medal – third place	2025 Lima	Women's singles
Pan Am Mixed Team Championships
Gold medal – first place	2008 Lima	Mixed team
Gold medal – first place	2010 Curitiba	Mixed team
Gold medal – first place	2013 Santo Domingo	Mixed team
Gold medal – first place	2014 Markham	Mixed team
Gold medal – first place	2023 Guadalajara	Mixed team
Gold medal – first place	2025 Aguascalientes	Mixed team
Pan Am Women's Team Championships
Gold medal – first place	2018 Tacarigua	Women's team
Gold medal – first place	2020 Salvador	Women's team
Gold medal – first place	2024 São Paulo	Women's team
Gold medal – first place	2026 Guatemala City	Women's team
Commonwealth Youth Games
Silver medal – second place	2008 Pune	Girls' doubles

Michelle Li
- Chinese: 李文珊
Transcriptions
Standard Mandarin
- Hanyu Pinyin: Lǐ Wénshān
Yue: Cantonese
- Jyutping: lei^{5} man^{4}saan^{1}

Michelle Li (born November 3, 1991) is a Canadian badminton player. Li is the 2014 Commonwealth Games champion and the first Canadian to win an individual gold medal in women's singles badminton at the Commonwealth Games. She has won gold in both singles and doubles at the Pan American Games and won the singles and team event titles from the Pan American Badminton Championships. As a competitor for Ontario, Li also won singles, doubles, and mixed team titles at the 2011 Canada Winter Games.

== Early life and education ==
Michelle Li was born in Hong Kong to Chi Keung Li and Agnes Kwong; together with her brother Mark, they moved to Canada in 1997. An active child, she started playing badminton at age 11 with her mom at the local community center. A friend introduced her to her current club, where she began lessons and competing locally in small tournaments. She started competing internationally when she was around 17 years old. Li graduated from Richmond Hill High School and is an undergraduate student at Rotman Commerce at the University of Toronto.

== Career ==
=== 2010–2012 ===
One of Li's early notable performances came at the 2011 Canada Winter Games in Halifax, Nova Scotia. There she won gold in the women's singles event and followed that performance with a gold in the doubles event with Alexandra Bruce. Due to this success, she was named the flag bearer for Team Ontario at the closing ceremonies for the games.

Later that year, Li was the gold medal winner in the women's doubles event alongside Bruce at the 2011 Pan American Games. Li would then go on the next day to win the women's singles competition, completing a second games double gold appearance that year, this time in Guadalajara.

At the 2012 Summer Olympics, Bruce and Li finished last in the round-robin portion of the women's doubles tournament, losing all three of their matches. However, the top two teams in the group were disqualified for attempting to intentionally lose matches so they would have an easier match-up in the quarterfinals. The duo was advanced to their quarterfinals, where they defeated Australia's Leanne Choo and Renuga Veeran. Bruce and Li finished in fourth place, the best Canadian finish in badminton at the Olympic Games. In the singles event, Li was knocked out by Wang Yihan.

=== 2013–2014 ===
In 2013, Li entered the finals of the Macau Open Grand Prix Gold, defeating Hong Kong top player Yip Pui Yin in the semi-finals, making her the first Pan-American athlete to ever enter into a singles final of a Grand Prix Gold event since that series began in 2007. In 2014, she also entered into the quarter-finals of the All England Open Badminton Championships Super Series Premier, beating Tai Tzu-ying in the first round, making her, in 35 years, the first Canadian player to enter at least the quarter-finals of this prestigious tournament. Later in 2014, Li won the Canada Open Grand Prix, making her the first home player to win this title ever since it became a Grand Prix event.

Li won the gold medal at the 2014 Commonwealth Games, defeating Kirsty Gilmour of Scotland in the final. She thus became the first Canadian woman to win a singles gold in Commonwealth badminton. She also won the singles gold medal at the 2014 Pan Am Badminton Championships in her home city, Markham, later that year.

=== 2015–2016 ===
At the 2015 Pan American Games, Li successfully defended her title, defeating fellow Canadian Rachel Honderich in the final.

In 2016, she qualified to represent Canada at the 2016 Summer Olympics but was defeated by P. V. Sindhu (21-19, 15-21, 17-21) and ranked 2nd in the group stage of women's singles.

Michelle also had several operations in 2016 to fix nagging injuries sustained earlier in her career. She took a year off in 2017 to heal from the operations and to focus on a comeback for 2018. After deeming herself fully fit, she entered the stage relatively quietly in 2018 until she made a landmark win against the 3rd seed Ratchanok Intanon in round 16 of the All England Open. She had not defeated Intanon previously. Michelle's progress was clear as she moved quickly around the court, playing much lighter on her feet than in previous years.

=== 2017–2021 ===
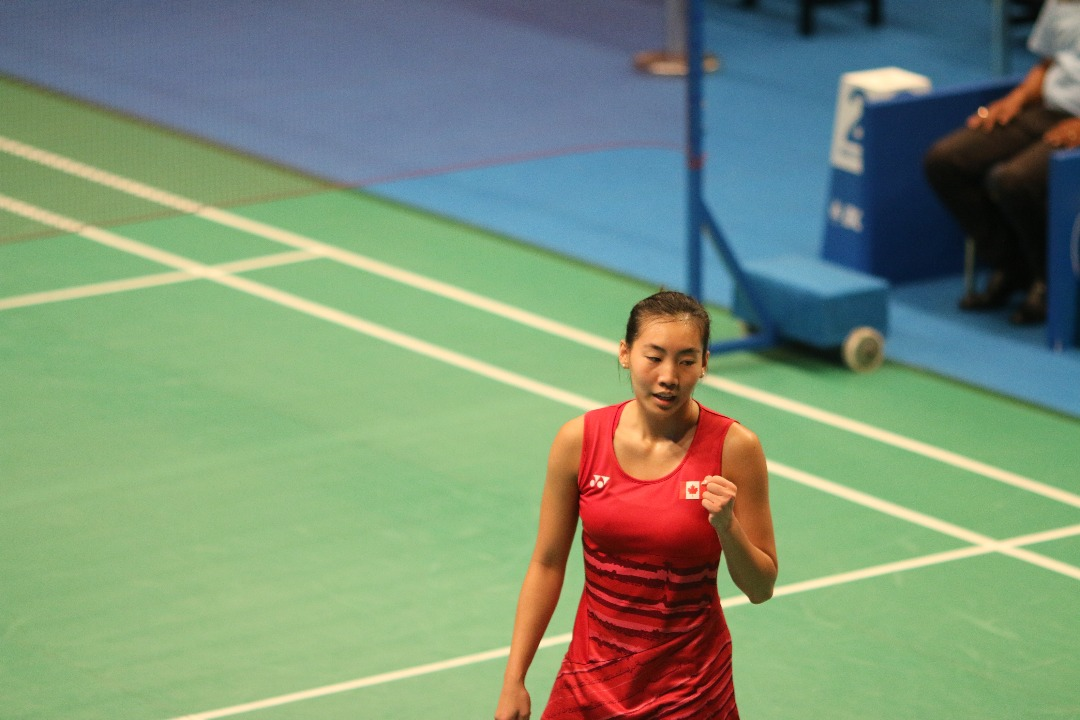
Li at the 2017 Indonesia Open Superseries Premier

During the 2018 Thomas Uber Cup, Li again played well. She defeated India's Saina Nehwal, who she had not previously beaten, by 21–15, 16–21, and 16–21. Li spearheaded Canada to their first-ever Uber Cup quarterfinal, and she defeated Sung Ji-hyun (21–14, 21–15). Canada eventually lost 3–1 to South Korea. Li also won her first Macau Open title by defeating the Olympic gold medalist, Li Xuerui (21-15, 21-18) in the quarterfinals in the same year.

In the 2019 Japan Open, Li played and defeated the No. 1 seed, Tai Tzu-ying (21–15, 15–21, 22–20), to reach the semis. She also reached another semi-finals in the 2019 Korea Open after defeating the No. 4 seed, Nozomi Okuhara (21-23, 21-16, 21-19). In the same year, she successfully defended her title again at the 2019 Pan American Games.

She qualified to represent Canada at the 2020 Summer Olympics but was defeated by Nozomi Okuhara (9–21, 7–21) in the round of 16.

=== 2022 ===
In 2022, Li won a silver medal at the 2022 Commonwealth Games after defeating Kirsty Gilmour of Scotland in the semi-finals and losing to P. V. Sindhu in the final. In the same year, Li also made a breakthrough in the 2022 BWF World Championships by defeating the eighth seed, Ratchanok Intanon (25-23, 16-21, 21-13), again in the round of 16. Though she eventually lost to the Olympic gold medalist and Chinese player Chen Yufei (18-21, 17-21), it marked her first time getting into the quarterfinals of the BWF World Championships since 2011.

=== 2023–2024 ===
In the 2023 BWF World Championships, Li retired from the competition owing to aggravating knee injury. This resulted in her absence from the remaining competitions of the BWF circuit and missing the 2023 Pan American Games in the same year. She made her comeback by entering the semi-finals in the 2024 German Open after beating the fourth seed, Pornpawee Chochuwong (21-19, 21-18).

She qualified to represent Canada at the 2024 Summer Olympics but was defeated by Akane Yamaguchi (24-22, 17-21, 12-21) and ranked 2nd in the group stage of women's singles.

=== 2025-2026 ===
In 2025, she entered the semi-finals in four different tournaments, especially the 2025 Hong Kong Open, after defeating Beiwen Zhang (16-21, 22-20, 21-17) and the 2025 Canada Open, after defeating Nozomi Okuhara (21-7, 19-21, 21-19).

In 2026, Li reached the quarterfinals of the BWF World Championships again in 2026 BWF World Championships. She defeated the 20-year-old eighth seed, Tomoka Miyazaki (17-21, 21-16, 21-18), in the round of 16 but lost to the No.2 seed, Akane Yamaguchi (17-21, 10-21).

== Achievements ==
=== Commonwealth Games ===
Women's singles
Year	Venue	Opponent	Score	Result
2014	Emirates Arena; Glasgow, Scotland	(Scotland) Kirsty Gilmour	21–14, 21–7	Gold
2022	National Exhibition Centre; Birmingham, England	(India) P. V. Sindhu	15–21, 13–21	Silver

=== Pan American Games ===
Women's singles
Year	Venue	Opponent	Score	Result
2011	Multipurpose Gymnasium; Guadalajara, Mexico	(Canada) Joycelyn Ko	21–12, 21–13	Gold
2015	Atos Markham Pan Am Centre; Toronto, Ontario, Canada	(Canada) Rachel Honderich	21–15, 21–9	Gold
2019	Polideportivo 3 Lima, Peru	(Canada) Rachel Honderich	21–11, 21–19	Gold

Women's doubles
Year	Venue	Partner	Opponent	Score	Result
2011	Multipurpose Gymnasium; Guadalajara, Mexico	(Canada) Alex Bruce	(United States) Iris Wang (United States) Rena Wang	21–15, 21–15	Gold
2015	Atos Markham Pan Am Centre; Toronto, Ontario, Canada	(Canada) Rachel Honderich	(United States) Eva Lee (United States) Paula Lynn Obañana	11–21, 8–21	Bronze

=== Pan Am Championships ===
Women's singles
Year	Venue	Opponent	Score	Result
2010	Clube Curitibano, Curitiba, Brazil	(United States) Cee Nantana Ketpura	21–17, 17–21, 19–21	Silver
2013	Palacio de los Deportes Virgilio Travieso Soto, Santo Domingo, Dominican Republic	(United States) Jamie Subandhi	21–8, 21–6	Gold
2014	Markham Pan Am Centre, Markham, Canada	(Canada) Rachel Honderich	21–13, 21–16	Gold
2018	Teodoro Palacios Flores Gymnasium, Guatemala City, Guatemala	(Canada) Rachel Honderich	21–15, 21–16	Gold
2019	Gimnasio Olímpico, Aguascalientes, Mexico	(Canada) Brittney Tam	21–15, 24–22	Gold
2022	Palacio de los Deportes Carlos "El Famoso" Hernández; San Salvador, El Salvador	(United States) Beiwen Zhang	21–18, 16–21, 25–23	Gold
2023	G.C. Foster College of Physical Education and Sport; Kingston, Jamaica	(United States) Beiwen Zhang	21–19, 21–9	Gold
2024	Teodoro Palacios Flores Gymnasium; Guatemala City, Guatemala	(United States) Beiwen Zhang	18–21, 21–18, 17–21	Silver
2025	Videna Poli 2 Lima, Peru	(Brazil) Juliana Viana Vieira	21–18, 21–23, 19–21	Bronze
2026	High Performance Center VIDENA; Lima, Peru	(Canada) Wen Yu Zhang	21–16, 22–20	Gold

Women's doubles
Year	Venue	Partner	Opponent	Score	Result
2010	Clube Curitibano; Curitiba, Brazil	(Canada) Alex Bruce	(Canada) Grace Gao (Canada) Joycelyn Ko	21–16, 21–23, 12–21	Silver
2013	Palacio de los Deportes Virgilio Travieso Soto; Santo Domingo, Dominican Republic	(Canada) Grace Gao	(United States) Eva Lee (United States) Paula Lynn Obañana	21–16, 11–21, 6–21	Bronze

Mixed doubles
Year	Venue	Partner	Opponent	Score	Result
2008	Club de Regatas; Lima, Peru	(Canada) Adrian Liu	(Canada) Toby Ng (Canada) Valerie Loker	14–21, 15–21	Bronze

=== Commonwealth Youth Games ===
Girls' doubles
Year	Venue	Partner	Opponent	Score	Result
2008	Shree Shiv Chhatrapati Sports Complex; Pune, India	(Canada) Alexandra Bruce	(India) P. C. Thulasi (India) N. Sikki Reddy	18–21, 8–21	Silver

=== BWF World Tour (3 titles, 1 runner-up) ===
The BWF World Tour, which was announced on 19 March 2017 and implemented in 2018, is a series of elite badminton tournaments sanctioned by the Badminton World Federation (BWF). The BWF World Tours are divided into levels of World Tour Finals, Super 1000, Super 750, Super 500, Super 300 (part of the BWF World Tour), and the BWF Tour Super 100.

Women's singles
Year	Tournament	Level	Opponent	Score	Result
2018	Macau Open	Super 300	(China) Han Yue	23–25, 21–17, 21–15	(gold) Winner
2019	Chinese Taipei Open	Super 300	(South Korea) Sung Ji-hyun	11–21, 9–21	(silver) Runner-up
2019	Macau Open	Super 300	(China) Han Yue	21–18, 21–8	(gold) Winner
2022	Canada Open	Super 100	(Chinese Taipei) Sung Shuo-yun	21–16, 21–15	(gold) Winner

=== BWF Grand Prix (3 titles, 3 runners-up) ===
The BWF Grand Prix had two levels, the Grand Prix and Grand Prix Gold. It was a series of badminton tournaments sanctioned by the Badminton World Federation (BWF) and played between 2007 and 2017.

Women's singles
Year	Tournament	Opponent	Score	Result
2013	Macau Open	(India) P. V. Sindhu	15–21, 12–21	(silver) Runner-up
2014	Canada Open	(Chinese Taipei) Pai Yu-po	21–16, 23–21	(gold) Winner
2015	Canada Open	(Japan) Kaori Imabeppu	21–17, 25–23	(gold) Winner
2016	Canada Open	(United States) Beiwen Zhang	Walkover	(gold) Winner
2017	U.S. Open	(Japan) Aya Ohori	11–21, 19–21	(silver) Runner-up
2017	Dutch Open	(United States) Beiwen Zhang	16–21, 14–21	(silver) Runner-up

BWF Grand Prix Gold tournament
BWF Grand Prix tournament

=== BWF International Challenge/Series (23 titles, 10 runners-up) ===
Women's singles
Year	Tournament	Opponent	Score	Result
2010	Peru International	(Japan) Manami Ebuchi	18–21, 17–21	(silver) Runner-up
2010	Canadian International	(Japan) Hitomi Oka	21–15, 12–21, 21–23	(silver) Runner-up
2011	Dutch International	(Scotland) Susan Egelstaff	18–21, 21–13, 15–21	(silver) Runner-up
2011	Guatemala International	(Switzerland) Jeanine Cicognini	21–15, 21–13	(gold) Winner
2011	Brazil International	(Japan) Kana Ito	21–15, 21–15	(gold) Winner
2011	Puerto Rico International	(Greece) Anne Hald Jensen	21–13, 29–27	(gold) Winner
2011	Canadian International	(Belgium) Lianne Tan	21–14, 21–11	(gold) Winner
2012	Finnish Open	(Netherlands) Yao Jie	20–22, 19–21	(silver) Runner-up
2012	Peru International	(Japan) Ai Goto	21–23, 21–14, 21–15	(gold) Winner
2012	Tahiti International	(Canada) Nicole Grether	21–8, 21–13	(gold) Winner
2013	Maldives International	(Indonesia) Hana Ramadhini	21–8, 21–13	(gold) Winner
2013	Canadian International	(Canada) Christin Tsai	21–14, 21–19	(gold) Winner
2013	Brazil International	(Brazil) Lohaynny Vicente	16–21, 21-15, 21-8	(gold) Winner
2014	Peru International	(United States) Beiwen Zhang	25–27, 19–21	(silver) Runner-up
2014	Belgian International	(Germany) Karin Schnaase	11–6, 11–2, 11–6	(gold) Winner
2014	Czech International	(Ukraine) Marija Ulitina	21–14, 21–17	(gold) Winner
2017	Peru International	(United States) Disha Gupta	21–10, 21–10	(gold) Winner
2022	Canadian International	(Japan) Natsuki Nidaira	21–11, 21–17	(gold) Winner
2024	Canadian International	(Brazil) Juliana Viana Vieira	18–21, 21–14, 17–21	(silver) Runner-up
2025	Canadian International	(Canada) Wen Yu Zhang	21–19, 21–23, 21–12	(gold) Winner

Women's doubles
Year	Tournament	Partner	Opponent	Score	Result
2011	Banuinvest International	(Canada) Alex Bruce	(Romania) Sonia Olariu (Romania) Florentina Petre	21–15, 21–14	(gold) Winner
2011	Peru International	(Canada) Alex Bruce	(United States) Iris Wang (United States) Rena Wang	11–21, 21–15, 21–8	(gold) Winner
2011	Brazil International	(Canada) Alex Bruce	(United States) Eva Lee (United States) Paula Lynn Obañana	14–21, 17–21	(silver) Runner-up
2011	Puerto Rico International	(Canada) Alex Bruce	(Canada) Grace Gao (Canada) Joycelyn Ko	24–22, 15–21, 21–11	(gold) Winner
2011	Canadian International	(Canada) Alex Bruce	(Canada) Nicole Grether (Canada) Charmaine Reid	21–10, 13–21, 21–16	(gold) Winner
2012	Finnish Open	(Canada) Alex Bruce	(Malaysia) Chow Mei Kuan (Malaysia) Lee Meng Yean	21–19, 12–21, 21–16	(gold) Winner
2012	Peru International	(Canada) Alex Bruce	(Canada) Nicole Grether (Canada) Charmaine Reid	21–18, 21–18	(gold) Winner
2012	Tahiti International	(Canada) Alex Bruce	(United States) Eva Lee (United States) Paula Lynn Obañana	13–21, 12–21	(silver) Runner-up
2013	Peru International	(Canada) Grace Gao	(Canada) Joycelyn Ko (Canada) Christin Tsai	21–15, 21–18	(gold) Winner
2014	Czech International	(Canada) Rachel Honderich	(Russia) Irina Khlebko (Russia) Elena Komendrovskaja	21–12, 21–17	(gold) Winner

Mixed doubles
Year	Tournament	Partner	Opponent	Score	Result
2013	Brazil International	(Chinese Taipei) Yang Chih-hsun	(United States) Phillip Chew (United States) Jamie Subandhi	13–21, 19–21	(silver) Runner-up
2013	USA International	(Canada) Toby Ng	(United States) Halim Haryanto (United States) Jing Yu Hong	21–16, 21–15	(gold) Winner
2014	Peru International	(Canada) Derrick Ng	(United States) Christian Yahya Christianto (United States) Eva Lee	16–21, 18–21	(silver) Runner-up

BWF International Challenge tournament
BWF International Series tournament

== Performance timeline ==
Key

W	Won	F	Finalist	SF	Semi-finalist
QF	Quarter-finalist	#R	Rounds 4, 3, 2, 1	RR	Round-robin stage
Q#	Qualification round	A	Absent	w/d	Withdrew
G	Gold	S	Silver	B	Bronze
NH	Not held	N/A	Not applicable	DNQ	Did not qualify

=== Individual competitions ===
- Senior level

Events	2011	2012	2013	2014	2015	2016	2017	2018	2019	2020	2021	2022	2023	2024	2025	2026
Pan Am Championships	NH	A	G	G	NH	A	QF	G	G	NH	A	G	G	S	SF	G
World Championships	2R	NH	1R	3R	3R	NH	2R	2R	3R	NH	3R	QF	2R	NH	3R	QF
Olympic Games	NH	RR	Not Held			RR	Not Held			R16	Not Held			RR	NH	NH
Commonwealth Games	Not Held			G	Not Held			4th	Not Held			S	NH			

Tournament	BWF Superseries / Grand Prix							BWF World Tour									Best
Tournament	2011	2012	2013	2014	2015	2016	2017	2018	2019	2020	2021	2022	2023	2024	2025	2026	Best
Malaysia Open	A	1R	Absent					2R	A	Not Held		1R	2R	1R	A	1R	2R ('18, '23)
India Open	Absent									Not Held		A	1R	1R	A	1R	1R ('23, '24, '26)
Thailand Masters	Not Held					Absent			QF	A	Not Held		A	1R	A	A	QF ('19)
Indonesia Masters	Absent						NH	1R	A	QF	1R	1R	1R	2R	1R	2R	QF ('20)
German Open	A	2R	2R	1R	2R	2R	A	1R	1R	Not Held		QF	A	SF	A	A	SF ('24)
All England Open	A	1R	1R	QF	1R	1R	A	2R	1R	1R	A	2R	1R	2R	1R	2R	QF ('14)
Swiss Open	A	1R	A	2R	QF	Absent			2R	NH	A	QF	2R	A	SF	1R	SF ('25)
Korea Open	A	1R	Absent		2R	A	2R	1R	SF	Not Held		1R	w/d	1R	A	A	SF ('19)
Thailand Open	Absent			Not Held	Absent		1R	QF	A	QF	NH	QF	QF	A			QF ('18, '20 I, '20 II, '22, '23)
Thailand Open	Absent			Not Held	Absent		1R	QF	A	QF	NH	QF	QF	A			QF ('18, '20 I, '20 II, '22, '23)
Indonesia Open	Absent			1R	1R	1R	1R	2R	2R	NH	1R	1R	1R	1R	1R	2R	2R ('18, '19, '26)
Malaysia Masters	Absent						NH	2R	1R	NH	A	1R	QF	A	QF	A	QF ('23, '25)
Singapore Open	Absent					2R	A	2R	A	Not Held		w/d	2R	1R	QF	2R	QF ('25)
Chinese Taipei Open	Absent		2R	Absent				1R	F	Not Held		w/d	A	A	A	A	F ('19)
Japan Open	Absent			1R	1R	1R	2R	1R	SF	Not held		A	w/d	2R	2R	2R	SF ('19)
Canada Open	QF	SF	2R	W	W	W	1R	2R	QF	Not Held		W	2R	QF	SF	SF	W ('14, '15, '16, '22)
U.S. Open	1R	A	1R	QF	1R	SF	F	SF	SF	Not Held			A	A	A	1R	F ('17)
Denmark Open	Absent				QF	A	2R	2R	2R	SF	w/d	2R	A	QF	QF		SF ('20)
French Open	1R	Absent		1R	1R	Absent		1R	1R	NH	w/d	1R	A	1R	2R		2R ('25)
Hylo Open	Absent		SF	w/d	A	2R	Absent				SF	w/d	A	A	A		SF ('14, '21)
Macau Open	2R	A	F	QF	Absent			W	W	Not Held				A	A		W ('18, '19)
Hong Kong Open	2R	Absent		1R	1R	A	QF	2R	1R	Not Held			w/d	A	SF		SF ('25)
Australian Open	Absent				QF	1R	1R	1R	QF	Not Held			A	A	SF		SF ('25)
China Open	Absent				2R	A	2R	1R	1R	Not Held			w/d	A	1R	1R	2R ('15, '17)
Japan Masters	NH												A	QF	2R		QF ('24)
China Masters	Absent				w/d	1R	A	2R	SF	NH			A	2R	2R		SF ('19)
Arctic Open	NH	A								NH			A	QF	A		QF ('24)
Superseries / Tour Finals	DNQ							RR	DNQ	RR	DNQ						RR ('18, '20)
Year-end ranking	24	35	24	14	15	34	21	13	8	10	11	14	24	22	12		8

== Record against selected opponents ==
Record against Year-end Finals finalists, World Championships semi-finalists, and Olympic quarter-finalists. Accurate as of 30 December 2025.

Players	Matches	Results		Difference
Players	Matches	Won	Lost	Difference
(Bulgaria) Petya Nedelcheva	1	1	0	+1
(China) Chen Yufei	13	1	12	–11
(China) Han Yue	6	3	3	0
(China) He Bingjiao	9	0	9	–9
(China) Li Xuerui	3	1	2	–1
(China) Wang Shixian	1	0	1	–1
(China) Wang Xin	1	0	1	–1
(China) Wang Yihan	6	0	6	–6
(China) Wang Zhiyi	5	1	4	–3
(China) Zhang Yiman	2	1	1	0
(Chinese Taipei) Cheng Shao-chieh	1	0	1	–1
(Chinese Taipei) Tai Tzu-ying	11	2	9	–7
(Denmark) Tine Baun	2	0	2	–2
(England) Tracey Hallam	1	1	0	+1
(France) Pi Hongyan	1	0	1	–1
(Germany) Juliane Schenk	3	0	3	–3

Players	Matches	Results		Difference
Players	Matches	Won	Lost	Difference
(Hong Kong) Yip Pui Yin	5	3	2	+1
(India) Saina Nehwal	3	1	2	–1
(India) P. V. Sindhu	15	5	10	–5
(Indonesia) Lindaweni Fanetri	2	0	2	–2
(Indonesia) Gregoria Mariska Tunjung	5	1	4	–3
(Indonesia) Putri Kusuma Wardani	1	0	1	–1
(Japan) Minatsu Mitani	4	1	3	–2
(Japan) Aya Ohori	4	1	3	–2
(Japan) Nozomi Okuhara	14	5	9	–4
(Japan) Akane Yamaguchi	11	0	11	–11
(South Korea) An Se-young	8	0	8	–8
(South Korea) Bae Yeon-ju	3	0	3	–3
(South Korea) Sung Ji-hyun	6	3	3	0
(Spain) Carolina Marín	7	2	5	–3
(Thailand) Porntip Buranaprasertsuk	2	1	1	0
(Thailand) Ratchanok Intanon	11	3	8	–5
