= 2018 Japan Open (badminton) =

2018 badminton tournament in Tokyo

Tournament details
- Dates: 11–16 September
- Level: Super 750
- Total prize money: US$700,000
- Venue: Musashino Forest Sport Plaza
- Location: Tokyo, Japan

Champions
- Men's singles: (Japan) Kento Momota
- Women's singles: (Spain) Carolina Marín
- Men's doubles: (Indonesia) Marcus Fernaldi Gideon (Indonesia) Kevin Sanjaya Sukamuljo
- Women's doubles: (Japan) Yuki Fukushima (Japan) Sayaka Hirota
- Mixed doubles: (China) Zheng Siwei (China) Huang Yaqiong

The 2018 Japan Open (officially known as the Daihatsu Yonex Japan Open 2018 for sponsorship reasons) was a badminton tournament which took place at Musashino Forest Sport Plaza in Tokyo, Japan, from 11 to 16 September 2018 and had a total prize of $700,000.

== Tournament ==
The 2018 Japan Open was the sixteenth tournament of the 2018 BWF World Tour and also part of the Japan Open championships, which had been held since 1982. This tournament was organized by Nippon Badminton Association, and sanctioned by the BWF.

=== Venue ===
This international tournament was held at Musashino Forest Sport Plaza in Tokyo, Japan.

=== Point distribution ===
Below is the point distribution table for each phase of the tournament based on the BWF points system for the BWF World Tour Super 750 event.

Winner	Runner-up	3/4	5/8	9/16	17/32
11,000	9,350	7,700	6,050	4,320	2,660

=== Prize money ===
The total prize money for this tournament was US$700,000. Distribution of prize money was in accordance with BWF regulations.

Event	Winner	Finals	Semi-finals	Quarter-finals	Last 16	Last 32
Singles	$49,000	$23,800	$9,800	$3,850	$2,100	$700
Doubles	$51,800	$24,500	$9,800	$4,375	$2,275	$700

== Men's singles ==
=== Seeds ===
1. (Denmark) Viktor Axelsen (semi-finals)
2. (China) Shi Yuqi (first round)
3. (Japan) Kento Momota (champion)
4. (South Korea) Son Wan-ho (second round)
5. (Chinese Taipei) Chou Tien-chen (second round)
6. (China) Chen Long (quarter-finals)
7. (India) Srikanth Kidambi (quarter-finals)
8. (Hong Kong) Ng Ka Long (first round)

=== Finals ===
Semi-finals
1	(Denmark) Viktor Axelsen	18	11
3	(Japan) Kento Momota	21	21
(South Korea) Lee Dong-keun	12	16
(Thailand) Khosit Phetpradab	21	21

Final
3	(Japan) Kento Momota	21	21
(Thailand) Khosit Phetpradab	14	11

=== Top half ===
==== Section 1 ====
First Round
1	(Denmark) V Axelsen	21	21
(Chinese Taipei) Hsu J-h	12	9
PFR	(Hong Kong) Lee C Y	16	10
(Japan) K Nishimoto	21	21
8	(Hong Kong) Ng K L	14	15
(Indonesia) A S Ginting	21	21
(India) H. S. Prannoy	21	21
(Indonesia) J Christie	18	17

Second Round
1	(Denmark) V Axelsen	21	21
(Japan) K Nishimoto	13	17
(Indonesia) A S Ginting	21	21
(India) H. S. Prannoy	14	17

Quarter-finals
1	(Denmark) V Axelsen	21	21
(Indonesia) A S Ginting	17	15

==== Section 2 ====
First Round
3	(Japan) K Momota	21	21
(Denmark) A Antonsen	9	10
(Denmark) R Gemke	21	21
PFR	(Thailand) T Saensomboonsuk	18	10
5	(Chinese Taipei) Chou T-c	21	21
(Japan) K Tsuneyama	11	10
(China) Lin D	16	21	21
(Thailand) K Wangcharoen	21	19	10

Second Round
3	(Japan) K Momota	21	21
(Denmark) R Gemke	16	18
5	(Chinese Taipei) Chou T-c	21	15	19
(China) Lin D	10	21	21

Quarter-finals
3	(Japan) K Momota	21	21
(China) Lin D	8	10

=== Bottom half ===
==== Section 3 ====
First Round
(Denmark) H-K Vittinghus	21	17	12
(Hong Kong) Wong W K	18	21	21
(China) Huang YX	13	15
7	(India) S Kidambi	21	21
(South Korea) Lee D-k	21	20	21
(India) S Verma	18	22	10
(Japan) K Sakai	21	15	20
4	(South Korea) Son W-h	17	21	22

Second Round
(Hong Kong) Wong W K	15	14
7	(India) S Kidambi	21	21
(South Korea) Lee D-k	21	21
4	(South Korea) Son W-h	13	13

Quarter-finals
7	(India) S Kidambi	21	16	18
(South Korea) Lee D-k	19	21	21

==== Section 4 ====
First Round
(France) B Leverdez	17	19
(Thailand) S Avihingsanon	21	21
(Indonesia) T Sugiarto	21	17	14
6	(China) Chen L	12	21	21
(Chinese Taipei) Wang T-w	14	17
(Netherlands) M Caljouw	21	21
(Thailand) K Phetpradab	21	24
2	(China) Shi YQ	18	22

Second Round
(Thailand) S Avihingsanon	6	10
6	(China) Chen L	21	21
(Netherlands) M Caljouw	14	18
(Thailand) K Phetpradab	21	21

Quarter-finals
6	(China) Chen L	19	22
(Thailand) K Phetpradab	21	24

== Women's singles ==
=== Seeds ===
1. (Chinese Taipei) Tai Tzu-ying (second round)
2. (Japan) Akane Yamaguchi (quarter-finals)
3. (India) P. V. Sindhu (second round)
4. (Thailand) Ratchanok Intanon (quarter-finals)
5. (China) Chen Yufei (semi-finals)
6. (Spain) Carolina Marín (champion)
7. (China) He Bingjiao (withdrew)
8. (Japan) Nozomi Okuhara (final)

=== Finals ===
Semi-finals
8	(Japan) Nozomi Okuhara	21	21
(Japan) Aya Ohori	12	12
6	(Spain) Carolina Marín	21	21
5	(China) Chen Yufei	12	13

Final
8	(Japan) Nozomi Okuhara	19	21	11
6	(Spain) Carolina Marín	21	17	21

=== Top half ===
==== Section 1 ====
First Round
1	(Chinese Taipei) Tai T-y	21	21
(Malaysia) S Cheah S Y	18	18
(United States) Zhang BW	13	12
(China) Chen XX	21	21
8	(Japan) N Okuhara	21	13
(Hong Kong) Cheung N Y	13	12^{r}
(Japan) S Sato	21	21
(Chinese Taipei) Lee C-h	7	11

Second Round
1	(Chinese Taipei) Tai T-y	18	14
(China) Chen XX	21	21
8	(Japan) N Okuhara	21	21
(Japan) S Sato	10	14

Quarter-finals
(China) Chen XX	17	16
8	(Japan) N Okuhara	21	21

==== Section 2 ====
First Round
3	(India) P. V. Sindhu	21	7	21
(Japan) S Takahashi	17	21	13
(China) Gao FJ	21	21
PFR	(India) V R Jakka	10	8
PFR	(Indonesia) L A Mainaky	21	21
PFR	(Israel) K Polikarpova	10	8
(Hong Kong) Yip P Y	14	10
(Japan) A Ohori	21	21

Second Round
3	(India) P. V. Sindhu	18	19
(China) Gao FJ	21	21
PFR	(Indonesia) L A Mainaky	11	14
(Japan) A Ohori	21	21

Quarter-finals
(China) Gao FJ	14	12
(Japan) A Ohori	21	21

=== Bottom half ===
==== Section 3 ====
First Round
(Thailand) P Chochuwong	21	21
(Scotland) K Gilmour	18	7
(Japan) S Kawakami	7	12
6	(Spain) C Marín	21	21
(Indonesia) G M Tunjung	21	21
(Russia) E Kosetskaya	18	17
(Japan) M Mitani	21	9	15
4	(Thailand) R Intanon	17	21	21

Second Round
(Thailand) P Chochuwong	11	23	11
6	(Spain) C Marín	21	21	21
(Indonesia) G M Tunjung	15	13
4	(Thailand) R Intanon	21	21

Quarter-finals
6	(Spain) C Marín	21	21
4	(Thailand) R Intanon	18	19

==== Section 4 ====
First Round
(Malaysia) Goh J W	21	14	16
(South Korea) Sung J-h	14	21	21
(Denmark) M Blichfeldt	16	18
5	(China) Chen YF	21	21
(Canada) M Li	11	14
(China) Cai YY	21	21
(Chinese Taipei) Pai Y-p	18	12
2	(Japan) A Yamaguchi	21	21

Second Round
(South Korea) Sung J-h	21	9	12
5	(China) Chen YF	18	21	21
(China) Cai YY	18	19
2	(Japan) A Yamaguchi	21	21

Quarter-finals
5	(China) Chen YF	21	15	21
2	(Japan) A Yamaguchi	13	21	15

== Men's doubles ==
=== Seeds ===
1. (Indonesia) Marcus Fernaldi Gideon / Kevin Sanjaya Sukamuljo (champions)
2. (China) Li Junhui / Liu Yuchen (final)
3. (Japan) Takeshi Kamura / Keigo Sonoda (second round)
4. (China) Liu Cheng / Zhang Nan (first round)
5. (Denmark) Mathias Boe / Carsten Mogensen (second round)
6. (Denmark) Mads Conrad-Petersen / Mads Pieler Kolding (first round)
7. (Japan) Takuto Inoue / Yuki Kaneko (first round)
8. (Denmark) Kim Astrup / Anders Skaarup Rasmussen (second round)

=== Finals ===
Semi-finals
1	(Indonesia) Marcus Fernaldi Gideon (Indonesia) Kevin Sanjaya Sukamuljo	21	14	21
(China) He Jiting (China) Tan Qiang	16	21	13
(Chinese Taipei) Chen Hung-ling (Chinese Taipei) Wang Chi-lin	14	16
2	(China) Li Junhui (China) Liu Yuchen	21	21

Final
1	(Indonesia) Marcus Fernaldi Gideon (Indonesia) Kevin Sanjaya Sukamuljo	21	21
2	(China) Li Junhui (China) Liu Yuchen	11	13

=== Top half ===
==== Section 1 ====
First Round
1	(Indonesia) M F Gideon (Indonesia) K S Sukamuljo	21	21
(Russia) V Ivanov (Russia) I Sozonov	15	15
(Canada) J Ho-shue (Canada) N Yakura	17	21	18
(Indonesia) W Nayaka (Indonesia) A Yusuf	21	15	21
5	(Denmark) M Boe (Denmark) C Mogensen	21	22
(Germany) M Lamsfuß (Germany) M E Seidel	11	20
(Netherlands) J Maas (Netherlands) R Tabeling	21	21
(China) Han CK (China) Zhou HD	18	16

Second Round
1	(Indonesia) M F Gideon (Indonesia) K S Sukamuljo	21	21
(Indonesia) W Nayaka (Indonesia) A Yusuf	13	17
5	(Denmark) M Boe (Denmark) C Mogensen	21	17	12
(Netherlands) J Maas (Netherlands) R Tabeling	14	21	21

Quarter-finals
1	(Indonesia) M F Gideon (Indonesia) K S Sukamuljo	21	17	21
(Netherlands) J Maas (Netherlands) R Tabeling	10	21	14

==== Section 2 ====
First Round
4	(China) Liu C (China) Zhang N	14	18
(Japan) T Hoki (Japan) Y Kobayashi	21	21
(Indonesia) B Angriawan (Indonesia) Hardianto	21	17	21
(Malaysia) M Arif A L (Malaysia) N M A Ayub	14	21	16
7	(Japan) T Inoue (Japan) Y Kaneko	21	19	17
(China) He JT (China) Tan Q	13	21	21
(Malaysia) Goh V S (Malaysia) Tan W K	21	21	19
(India) M Attri (India) B. S Reddy	15	23	21

Second Round
(Japan) T Hoki (Japan) Y Kobayashi	21	21
(Indonesia) B Angriawan (Indonesia) Hardianto	17	13
(China) He JT (China) Tan Q	21	16	21
(India) M Attri (India) B. S Reddy	18	21	12

Quarter-finals
(Japan) T Hoki (Japan) Y Kobayashi	21	19	15
(China) He JT (China) Tan Q	18	21	21

=== Bottom half ===
==== Section 3 ====
First Round
(Thailand) T Isriyanet (Thailand) K Namdash	10	11
(Chinese Taipei) Chen H-l (Chinese Taipei) Wang C-l	21	21
(Indonesia) R K Suwardi (Indonesia) A Pratama	13	11
8	(Denmark) K Astrup (Denmark) A S Rasmussen	21	21
(Chinese Taipei) Liao M-c (Chinese Taipei) Su C-h	11	18
PFR	(South Korea) Kim W-h (South Korea) Seo S-j	21	21
(India) S Rankireddy (India) C Shetty	12	17
3	(Japan) T Kamura (Japan) K Sonoda	21	21

Second Round
(Chinese Taipei) Chen H-l (Chinese Taipei) Wang C-l	21	21
8	(Denmark) K Astrup (Denmark) A S Rasmussen	16	15
PFR	(South Korea) Kim W-h (South Korea) Seo S-j	16	21	21
3	(Japan) T Kamura (Japan) K Sonoda	21	18	18

Quarter-finals
(Chinese Taipei) Chen H-l (Chinese Taipei) Wang C-l	21	21
PFR	(South Korea) Kim W-h (South Korea) Seo S-j	17	19

==== Section 4 ====
First Round
(Malaysia) Ong Y S (Malaysia) Teo E Y	17	18
(Indonesia) F Alfian (Indonesia) M R Ardianto	21	21
(Chinese Taipei) Lee J-h (Chinese Taipei) Lee Y	21	21
6	(Denmark) M Conrad-Petersen (Denmark) M P Kolding	19	16
(Japan) H Endo (Japan) Y Watanabe	17	22	17
(Indonesia) M Ahsan (Indonesia) H Setiawan	21	20	21
(South Korea) Chung E-s (South Korea) Kim D-y	15	16
2	(China) Li JH (China) Liu YC	21	21

Second Round
(Indonesia) F Alfian (Indonesia) M R Ardianto	21	21
(Chinese Taipei) Lee J-h (Chinese Taipei) Lee Y	14	18
(Indonesia) M Ahsan (Indonesia) H Setiawan
2	(China) Li JH (China) Liu YC	w	/	o

Quarter-finals
(Indonesia) F Alfian (Indonesia) M R Ardianto	20	21	14
2	(China) Li JH (China) Liu YC	22	18	21

== Women's doubles ==
=== Seeds ===
1. (Japan) Yuki Fukushima / Sayaka Hirota (champions)
2. (Japan) Misaki Matsutomo / Ayaka Takahashi (second round)
3. (China) Chen Qingchen / Jia Yifan (final)
4. (Indonesia) Greysia Polii / Apriyani Rahayu (semi-finals)
5. (Japan) Shiho Tanaka / Koharu Yonemoto (first round)
6. (Thailand) Jongkolphan Kititharakul / Rawinda Prajongjai (quarter-finals)
7. (South Korea) Lee So-hee / Shin Seung-chan (first round)
8. (Japan) Mayu Matsumoto / Wakana Nagahara (quarter-finals)

=== Finals ===
Semi-finals
1	(Japan) Yuki Fukushima (Japan) Sayaka Hirota	21	21
4	(Indonesia) Greysia Polii (Indonesia) Apriyani Rahayu	12	18
3	(China) Chen Qingchen (China) Jia Yifan	21	21
(China) Du Yue (China) Li Yinhui	17	15

Final
1	(Japan) Yuki Fukushima (Japan) Sayaka Hirota	21	21
3	(China) Chen Qingchen (China) Jia Yifan	15	12

=== Top half ===
==== Section 1 ====
First Round
(India) A Ponnappa (India) N. S Reddy	17	13
(South Korea) Chang Y-n (South Korea) Jung K-e	21	21
6	(Thailand) J Kititharakul (Thailand) R Prajongjai	21	21
(United States) A Lee (United States) S Lee	2	8
(China) Huang DP (China) Li WM
(Thailand) S Paewsampran (Thailand) P Supajirakul	w	/	o

Second Round
1	(Japan) Y Fukushima (Japan) S Hirota	21	15	21
(South Korea) Chang Y-n (South Korea) Jung K-e	17	21	9
6	(Thailand) J Kititharakul (Thailand) R Prajongjai	21	21
(Thailand) S Paewsampran (Thailand) P Supajirakul	13	18

Quarter-finals
1	(Japan) Y Fukushima (Japan) S Hirota	21	21
6	(Thailand) J Kititharakul (Thailand) R Prajongjai	12	7

==== Section 2 ====
First Round
(Japan) A Sakuramoto (Japan) Y Takahata	21	15	21
(Indonesia) D D Haris (Indonesia) R A Pradipta	13	21	11
7	(South Korea) Lee S-h (South Korea) Shin S-c	11^{r}
(United States) E Kan (United States) I Zhong	8
(Bulgaria) G Stoeva (Bulgaria) S Stoeva	15	21	21
(Japan) N Fukuman (Japan) K Yonao	21	11	9

Second Round
4	(Indonesia) G Polii (Indonesia) A Rahayu	14	21	21
(Japan) A Sakuramoto (Japan) Y Takahata	21	16	10
(United States) E Kan (United States) I Zhong	11	7
(Bulgaria) G Stoeva (Bulgaria) S Stoeva	21	21

Quarter-finals
4	(Indonesia) G Polii (Indonesia) A Rahayu	19	21	21
(Bulgaria) G Stoeva (Bulgaria) S Stoeva	21	17	12

=== Bottom half ===
==== Section 3 ====
First Round
(Chinese Taipei) Hsu Y-c (Chinese Taipei) Wu T-j	17	21	14
(Japan) N Matsuyama (Japan) C Shida	21	14	21
(China) Tang JH (China) Yu XH	21	21
5	(Japan) S Tanaka (Japan) K Yonemoto	17	10
(Indonesia) A S Awanda (Indonesia) N K M Istarani	16	18
(Japan) M Aratama (Japan) A Watanabe	21	21

Second Round
(Japan) N Matsuyama (Japan) C Shida	20	21	10
(China) Tang JH (China) Yu XH	22	19	21
(Japan) M Aratama (Japan) A Watanabe	19	16
3	(China) Chen QC (China) Jia YF	21	21

Quarter-finals
(China) Tang JH (China) Yu XH	11	15
3	(China) Chen QC (China) Jia YF	21	21

==== Section 4 ====
First Round
(South Korea) Baek H-n (South Korea) Kim H-r
(Denmark) M Fruergaard (Denmark) S Thygesen	w	/	o
(Russia) E Bolotova (Russia) A Davletova	9	12
8	(Japan) M Matsumoto (Japan) W Nagahara	21	21
(South Korea) Kim S-y (South Korea) Kong H-y	13	11
(China) Du Y (China) Li YH	21	21

Second Round
(Denmark) M Fruergaard (Denmark) S Thygesen	17	13
8	(Japan) M Matsumoto (Japan) W Nagahara	21	21
(China) Du Y (China) Li YH	12	27	21
2	(Japan) M Matsutomo (Japan) A Takahashi	21	25	11

Quarter-finals
8	(Japan) M Matsumoto (Japan) W Nagahara	16	10
(China) Du Y (China) Li YH	21	21

== Mixed doubles ==
=== Seeds ===
1. (China) Zheng Siwei / Huang Yaqiong (champions)
2. (China) Wang Yilü / Huang Dongping (final)
3. (Indonesia) Tontowi Ahmad / Liliyana Natsir (withdrew)
4. (Hong Kong) Tang Chun Man / Tse Ying Suet (second round)
5. (China) Zhang Nan / Li Yinhui (quarter-finals)
6. (Malaysia) Goh Soon Huat / Shevon Jemie Lai (quarter-finals)
7. (England) Chris Adcock / Gabrielle Adcock (second round)
8. (Indonesia) Hafiz Faizal / Gloria Emanuelle Widjaja (second round)

=== Finals ===
Semi-finals
1	(China) Zheng Siwei (China) Huang Yaqiong	21	17	21
(Malaysia) Chan Peng Soon (Malaysia) Goh Liu Ying	16	21	14
(Japan) Yuta Watanabe (Japan) Arisa Higashino	15	17
2	(China) Wang Yilü (China) Huang Dongping	21	21

Final
1	(China) Zheng Siwei (China) Huang Yaqiong	21	21
2	(China) Wang Yilü (China) Huang Dongping	19	8

=== Top half ===
==== Section 1 ====
First Round
1	(China) Zheng SW (China) Huang YQ	21	21
(Indonesia) R K Suwardi (Indonesia) D Susanto	14	12
(Chinese Taipei) Lu C-y (Chinese Taipei) Hu L-f	21	15
(Japan) Y Kaneko (Japan) M Matsutomo	23	21
5	(China) Zhang N (China) Li YH	21	21
(Russia) R Alimov (Russia) A Davletova	11	18
(Malaysia) Tan K M (Malaysia) Lai P J	7	21	21
(Thailand) D Puavaranukroh (Thailand) S Taerattanachai	21	16	15

Second Round
1	(China) Zheng SW (China) Huang YQ	21	21
(Japan) Y Kaneko (Japan) M Matsutomo	18	14
5	(China) Zhang N (China) Li YH	21	21
(Malaysia) Tan K M (Malaysia) Lai P J	9	18

Quarter-finals
1	(China) Zheng SW (China) Huang YQ	21	21
5	(China) Zhang N (China) Li YH	10	13

==== Section 2 ====
First Round
PFR	(United States) M Fogarty (United States) I Zhong	9	6
(India) P Chopra (India) N. S Reddy	21	21
(Malaysia) Chan P S (Malaysia) Goh L Y	21	21
(Chinese Taipei) Lee Y (Chinese Taipei) Hsu Y-c	14	18
7	(England) C Adcock (England) G Adcock	21	18	21
(China) Lu K (China) Chen L	18	21	16
(Indonesia) P Jordan (Indonesia) M D Oktavianti	21	22
(Netherlands) R Tabeling (Netherlands) C Seinen	15	20

Second Round
(India) P Chopra (India) N. S Reddy	16	16
(Malaysia) Chan P S (Malaysia) Goh L Y	21	21
7	(England) C Adcock (England) G Adcock	21	18
(Indonesia) P Jordan (Indonesia) M D Oktavianti	23	21

Quarter-finals
(Malaysia) Chan P S (Malaysia) Goh L Y	21	20	21
(Indonesia) P Jordan (Indonesia) M D Oktavianti	19	22	17

=== Bottom half ===
==== Section 3 ====
First Round
(Japan) T Hoki (Japan) K Yonemoto	21	21
(Denmark) N Nøhr (Denmark) S Thygesen	10	15
(Germany) M Lamsfuß (Germany) I Herttrich	13	17
8	(Indonesia) H Faizal (Indonesia) G E Widjaja	21	21
(Thailand) N Phuangphuapet (Thailand) S Amitrapai
(Japan) Y Watanabe (Japan) A Higashino	w	/	o
(Republic of Ireland) S Magee (Republic of Ireland) C Magee	13	15
4	(Hong Kong) Tang C M (Hong Kong) Tse Y S	21	21

Second Round
(Japan) T Hoki (Japan) K Yonemoto	19	21	21
8	(Indonesia) H Faizal (Indonesia) G E Widjaja	21	15	14
(Japan) Y Watanabe (Japan) A Higashino	21	15	21
4	(Hong Kong) Tang C M (Hong Kong) Tse Y S	14	21	16

Quarter-finals
(Japan) T Hoki (Japan) K Yonemoto	9	12
(Japan) Y Watanabe (Japan) A Higashino	21	21

==== Section 4 ====
First Round
(Hong Kong) Lee C H (Hong Kong) Chau H W
(China) He JT (China) Du Y	w	/	o
(Denmark) J Fischer Nielsen (Denmark) A Bøje
6	(Malaysia) Goh S H (Malaysia) S J Lai	w	/	o
(Germany) M E Seidel (Germany) L Efler	17	13
(Chinese Taipei) Wang C-l (Chinese Taipei) Lee C-h	21	21
(India) S Rankireddy (India) A Ponnappa	10	19
2	(China) Wang YL (China) Huang DP	21	21

Second Round
(China) He JT (China) Du Y	13	21
6	(Malaysia) Goh S H (Malaysia) S J Lai	21	23
(Chinese Taipei) Wang C-l (Chinese Taipei) Lee C-h	8	8
2	(China) Wang YL (China) Huang DP	21	21

Quarter-finals
6	(Malaysia) Goh S H (Malaysia) S J Lai	18	6
2	(China) Wang YL (China) Huang DP	21	21

Preceded by 2018 Hyderabad Open	BWF World Tour; 2018 BWF season	Succeeded by 2018 China Open
