= 2018 China Open (badminton) =

2018 badminton tournament in Changzhou

Tournament details
- Dates: 18–23 September
- Level: Super 1000
- Total prize money: US$1,000,000
- Venue: Olympic Sports Center Xincheng Gymnasium
- Location: Changzhou, Jiangsu, China

Champions
- Men's singles: (Indonesia) Anthony Sinisuka Ginting
- Women's singles: (Spain) Carolina Marín
- Men's doubles: (Denmark) Kim Astrup (Denmark) Anders Skaarup Rasmussen
- Women's doubles: (Japan) Misaki Matsutomo (Japan) Ayaka Takahashi
- Mixed doubles: (China) Zheng Siwei (China) Huang Yaqiong

The 2018 China Open (officially known as the Victor China Open 2018 for sponsorship reasons) was a badminton tournament which took place at Olympic Sports Center Xincheng Gymnasium in Changzhou, Jiangsu, China, from 18 to 23 September 2018. It had a total prize of $1,000,000.

== Tournament ==
The 2018 China Open was the seventeenth tournament of the 2018 BWF World Tour and also part of the China Open championships, which had been held since 1986. This tournament was organized by Chinese Badminton Association, and sanctioned by the BWF.

=== Venue ===
This international tournament was held at Olympic Sports Center Xincheng Gymnasium in Changzhou, Jiangsu, China.

=== Point distribution ===
Below is the point distribution table for each phase of the tournament based on the BWF points system for the BWF World Tour Super 1000 event.

Winner	Runner-up	3/4	5/8	9/16	17/32
12,000	10,200	8,400	6,600	4,800	3,000

=== Prize money ===
The total prize money for this tournament was US$1,000,000. Distribution of prize money was in accordance with BWF regulations.

Event	Winner	Finals	Semi-finals	Quarter-finals	Last 16	Last 32
Singles	$70,000	$34,000	$14,000	$5,500	$3,000	$1,000
Doubles	$74,000	$35,000	$14,000	$6,250	$3,250	$1,000

== Men's singles ==
=== Seeds ===
1. (Denmark) Viktor Axelsen (second round)
2. (China) Shi Yuqi (semi-finals)
3. (Japan) Kento Momota (final)
4. (South Korea) Son Wan-ho (quarter-finals)
5. (Chinese Taipei) Chou Tien-chen (semi-finals)
6. (China) Chen Long (quarter-finals)
7. (India) Srikanth Kidambi (quarter-finals)
8. (Hong Kong) Ng Ka Long (quarter-finals)

=== Finals ===
Semi-finals
(Indonesia) Anthony Sinisuka Ginting	12	21	21
5	(Chinese Taipei) Chou Tien-chen	21	17	15
3	(Japan) Kento Momota	21	21
2	(China) Shi Yuqi	10	17

Final
(Indonesia) Anthony Sinisuka Ginting	23	21
3	(Japan) Kento Momota	21	19

=== Top half ===
==== Section 1 ====
First Round
1	(Denmark) Viktor Axelsen	21	21
(Thailand) K Phetpradab	12	15
(Indonesia) A S Ginting	22	21	21
(China) Lin D	24	5	19
6	(China) Chen L	20	21	21
(China) Huang YX	22	19	13
PFR	(Denmark) J Ø. Jørgensen	18	21	21
(South Korea) Lee D-k	21	17	13

Second Round
1	(Denmark) V Axelsen	18	17
(Indonesia) A S Ginting	21	21
6	(China) Chen L	21	21
PFR	(Denmark) J Ø. Jørgensen	10	5

Quarter-finals
(Indonesia) A S Ginting	18	22	21
6	(China) Chen L	21	20	16

==== Section 2 ====
First Round
4	(South Korea) Son W-h	19	21	21
PFR	(Hong Kong) Lee C Y	21	5	13
(Hong Kong) Wong W K	21	21
(Chinese Taipei) Wang T-w	10	13
5	(Chinese Taipei) Chou T-c	21	20	21
(Chinese Taipei) Hsu J-h	11	22	19
(Denmark) H-K Vittinghus	18	18
(Thailand) K Wangcharoen	21	21

Second Round
4	(South Korea) Son W-h	21	21
(Hong Kong) Wong W K	16	16
5	(Chinese Taipei) Chou T-c	21	21
(Thailand) K Wangcharoen	14	11

Quarter-finals
4	(South Korea) Son W-h	17	14
5	(Chinese Taipei) Chou T-c	21	21

=== Bottom half ===
==== Section 3 ====
First Round
(Netherlands) M Caljouw	20	17
(Thailand) S Avihingsanon	22	21
(Denmark) R Gemke	9	19
7	(India) S Kidambi	21	21
(Japan) K Nishimoto	21	21
(Japan) K Sakai	12	11
(France) B Leverdez	14	12
3	(Japan) K Momota	21	21

Second Round
(Thailand) S Avihingsanon	12	21	22
7	(India) S Kidambi	21	15	24
(Japan) K Nishimoto	9	9
3	(Japan) K Momota	21	21

Quarter-finals
7	(India) S Kidambi	9	11
3	(Japan) K Momota	21	21

==== Section 4 ====
First Round
(Japan) K Tsuneyama	18	21	13
(Indonesia) J Christie	21	17	21
(India) H. S. Prannoy	16	12
8	(Hong Kong) Ng K L	21	21
(Denmark) A Antonsen	21	19	18
(South Korea) Lee H-i	18	21	21
(Indonesia) T Sugiarto	21	13
2	(China) Shi YQ	23	21

Second Round
(Indonesia) J Christie	18	16
8	(Hong Kong) Ng K L	21	21
(South Korea) Lee H-i	21	18	15
2	(China) Shi YQ	19	21	21

Quarter-finals
8	(Hong Kong) Ng K L	17	15
2	(China) Shi YQ	21	21

== Women's singles ==
=== Seeds ===
1. (Chinese Taipei) Tai Tzu-ying (first round)
2. (Japan) Akane Yamaguchi (semi-finals)
3. (India) P. V. Sindhu (quarter-finals)
4. (Thailand) Ratchanok Intanon (first round)
5. (China) Chen Yufei (final)
6. (Spain) Carolina Marín (champion)
7. (China) He Bingjiao (quarter-finals)
8. (Japan) Nozomi Okuhara (semi-finals)

=== Finals ===
Semi-finals
6	(Spain) Carolina Marín	15	21	21
8	(Japan) Nozomi Okuhara	21	12	13
5	(China) Chen Yufei	21	15	21
2	(Japan) Akane Yamaguchi	14	21	14

Final
6	(Spain) Carolina Marín	21	21
5	(China) Chen Yufei	18	13

=== Top half ===
==== Section 1 ====
First Round
1	(Chinese Taipei) Tai T-y	17	16
(China) Gao FJ	21	21
(Thailand) N Jindapol	21	21
(China) Cai YY	14	18
6	(Spain) C Marín	21	21
(Denmark) M Blichfeldt	13	13
(Japan) S Takahashi	21	21
(Scotland) K Gilmour	18	9

Second Round
(China) Gao FJ	22	21
(Thailand) N Jindapol	20	18
6	(Spain) C Marín	21	14	21
(Japan) S Takahashi	16	21	9

Quarter-finals
(China) Gao FJ	10	22
6	(Spain) C Marín	21	24

==== Section 2 ====
First Round
4	(Thailand) R Intanon	21	16	16
(United States) Zhang BW	9	21	21
(Indonesia) G M Tunjung	12	21	23
(China) Chen XX	21	19	21
8	(Japan) N Okuhara	21	21
(Canada) M Li	12	13
(Malaysia) S Cheah	15	12
(Thailand) P Chochuwong	21	21

Second Round
(United States) Zhang BW	21	20
(Indonesia) G M Tunjung	23	22
8	(Japan) N Okuhara	21	22
(Thailand) P Chochuwong	9	20

Quarter-finals
(Indonesia) G M Tunjung	15	21	12
8	(Japan) N Okuhara	21	19	21

=== Bottom half ===
==== Section 3 ====
First Round
(India) S Nehwal	22	8	14
(South Korea) Sung J-h	20	21	21
(Japan) S Sato	17	9
5	(China) Chen YF	21	21
(Thailand) B Ongbamrungphan	21	21
(Spain) B Corrales	12	16
PFR	(Japan) S Kawakami	15	13
3	(India) P. V. Sindhu	21	21

Second Round
(South Korea) Sung J-h	18	15
5	(China) Chen YF	21	21
(Thailand) B Ongbamrungphan	23	13	18
3	(India) P. V. Sindhu	21	21	21

Quarter-finals
5	(China) Chen YF	21	11	21
3	(India) P. V. Sindhu	11	21	15

==== Section 4 ====
First Round
(Chinese Taipei) Lee C-h	16	21	20
(Russia) E Kosetskaya	21	18	22
(Denmark) L Kjærsfeldt	9	15
7	(China) He BJ	21	21
(Japan) A Ohori	21	21
(Chinese Taipei) Pai Y-p	11	18
(Malaysia) Goh J W	21	21	15
2	(Japan) A Yamaguchi	23	12	21

Second Round
(Russia) E Kosetskaya	16	15
7	(China) He BJ	21	21
(Japan) A Ohori	21	14	17
2	(Japan) A Yamaguchi	18	21	21

Quarter-finals
7	(China) He BJ	19	16
2	(Japan) A Yamaguchi	21	21

== Men's doubles ==
=== Seeds ===
1. (Indonesia) Marcus Fernaldi Gideon / Kevin Sanjaya Sukamuljo (semi-finals)
2. (China) Li Junhui / Liu Yuchen (quarter-finals)
3. (Japan) Takeshi Kamura / Keigo Sonoda (first round)
4. (China) Liu Cheng / Zhang Nan (first round)
5. (Denmark) Mathias Boe / Carsten Mogensen (withdrew)
6. (Denmark) Mads Conrad-Petersen / Mads Pieler Kolding (first round)
7. (Japan) Takuto Inoue / Yuki Kaneko (first round)
8. (Denmark) Kim Astrup / Anders Skaarup Rasmussen (champions)

=== Finals ===
Semi-finals
1	(Indonesia) Marcus Fernaldi Gideon (Indonesia) Kevin Sanjaya Sukamuljo	19	21	17
(China) Han Chengkai (China) Zhou Haodong	21	11	21
(Chinese Taipei) Chen Hung-ling (Chinese Taipei) Wang Chi-lin	13	19
8	(Denmark) Kim Astrup (Denmark) Anders Skaarup Rasmussen	21	21

Final
(China) Han Chengkai (China) Zhou Haodong	13	21	14
8	(Denmark) Kim Astrup (Denmark) Anders Skaarup Rasmussen	21	17	21

=== Top half ===
==== Section 1 ====
First Round
1	(Indonesia) M F Gideon (Indonesia) K S Sukamuljo	17	21	21
(Indonesia) W Nayaka (Indonesia) A Yusuf	21	13	13
(Thailand) T Isriyanet (Thailand) K Namdash	21	21
(Canada) J Ho-shue (Canada) N Yakura	14	9
7	(Japan) T Inoue (Japan) Y Kaneko	19	14
(Indonesia) R Karanda Suwardi (Indonesia) A Pratama	21	21
(India) S Rankireddy (India) C Shetty	19	20
(Malaysia) Goh V S (Malaysia) Tan W K	21	22

Second Round
1	(Indonesia) M F Gideon (Indonesia) K S Sukamuljo	21	21
(Thailand) T Isriyanet (Thailand) K Namdash	13	13
(Indonesia) R Karanda Suwardi (Indonesia) A Pratama	21	17	21
(Malaysia) Goh V S (Malaysia) Tan W K	14	21	19

Quarter-finals
1	(Indonesia) M F Gideon (Indonesia) K S Sukamuljo	21	21
(Indonesia) R Karanda Suwardi (Indonesia) A Pratama	13	12

==== Section 2 ====
First Round
4	(China) Liu C (China) Zhang N	19	14
(Indonesia) M Ahsan (Indonesia) H Setiawan	21	21
(China) Huang KX (China) Wang YL	21	21
(Chinese Taipei) Lee J-h (Chinese Taipei) Lee Y	11	16
6	(Denmark) M Conrad-Petersen (Denmark) M P Kolding	20	21	16
(Indonesia) B Angriawan (Indonesia) Hardianto	22	11	21
(China) Han CK (China) Zhou HD	21	21
(Russia) V Ivanov (Russia) I Sozonov	18	16

Second Round
(Indonesia) M Ahsan (Indonesia) H Setiawan	11	12
(China) Huang KX (China) Wang YL	21	21
(Indonesia) B Angriawan (Indonesia) Hardianto	21	23	22
(China) Han CK (China) Zhou HD	8	25	24

Quarter-finals
(China) Huang KX (China) Wang YL	16	18
(China) Han CK (China) Zhou HD	21	21

=== Bottom half ===
==== Section 3 ====
First Round
(India) M Attri (India) B. S Reddy	13	21	21
(Chinese Taipei) Liao M-c (Chinese Taipei) Su C-h	21	13	12
(Chinese Taipei) Chen H-l (Chinese Taipei) Wang C-l	21	21
PFR	(Netherlands) J Maas (Netherlands) R Tabeling	11	13
(China) He JT (China) Tan Q	21	18	21
(Japan) T Hoki (Japan) Y Kobayashi	16	21	18
(Indonesia) F Alfian (Indonesia) M R Ardianto	20	21	21
3	(Japan) T Kamura (Japan) K Sonoda	22	15	15

Second Round
(India) M Attri (India) B. S Reddy	9	10
(Chinese Taipei) Chen H-l (Chinese Taipei) Wang C-l	21	21
(China) He JT (China) Tan Q	21	12	21
(Indonesia) F Alfian (Indonesia) M R Ardianto	17	21	17

Quarter-finals
(Chinese Taipei) Chen H-l (Chinese Taipei) Wang C-l	19	21	22
(China) He JT (China) Tan Q	21	12	20

==== Section 4 ====
First Round
(Germany) M Lamsfuß (Germany) M E Seidel	21	21
(China) Ou XY (China) Ren XY	16	18
(Japan) H Endo (Japan) Y Watanabe	18	21	11
8	(Denmark) K Astrup (Denmark) A S Rasmussen	21	17	21
(Malaysia) Ong Y S (Malaysia) Teo E Y	21	21
(England) M Ellis (England) C Langridge	11	15
(Chinese Taipei) Lu C-y (Chinese Taipei) Yang P-h	12	22
2	(China) Li JH (China) Liu YC	21	24

Second Round
(Germany) M Lamsfuß (Germany) M E Seidel	9	9
8	(Denmark) K Astrup (Denmark) A S Rasmussen	21	21
(Malaysia) Ong Y S (Malaysia) Teo E Y	15	21	17
2	(China) Li JH (China) Liu YC	21	17	21

Quarter-finals
8	(Denmark) K Astrup (Denmark) A S Rasmussen	21	21
2	(China) Li JH (China) Liu YC	12	13

== Women's doubles ==
=== Seeds ===
1. (Japan) Yuki Fukushima / Sayaka Hirota (quarter-finals)
2. (Japan) Misaki Matsutomo / Ayaka Takahashi (champions)
3. (China) Chen Qingchen / Jia Yifan (quarter-finals)
4. (Indonesia) Greysia Polii / Apriyani Rahayu (semi-finals)
5. (Japan) Shiho Tanaka / Koharu Yonemoto (quarter-finals)
6. (Thailand) Jongkolphan Kititharakul / Rawinda Prajongjai (first round)
7. (South Korea) Lee So-hee / Shin Seung-chan (second round)
8. (Japan) Mayu Matsumoto / Wakana Nagahara (final)

=== Finals ===
Semi-finals
8	(Japan) Mayu Matsumoto (Japan) Wakana Nagahara	21	21
(Bulgaria) Gabriela Stoeva (Bulgaria) Stefani Stoeva	16	12
4	(Indonesia) Greysia Polii (Indonesia) Apriyani Rahayu	17	21	16
2	(Japan) Misaki Matsutomo (Japan) Ayaka Takahashi	21	12	21

Final
8	(Japan) Mayu Matsumoto (Japan) Wakana Nagahara	16	12
2	(Japan) Misaki Matsutomo (Japan) Ayaka Takahashi	21	21

=== Top half ===
==== Section 1 ====
First Round
1	(Japan) Y Fukushima (Japan) S Hirota	21	14	26
(Indonesia) A S Awanda (Indonesia) N K M Istarani	16	21	24
(Germany) L Efler (Germany) I Herttrich	15	16
(China) Dong WJ (China) Feng XY	21	21
8	(Japan) M Matsumoto (Japan) W Nagahara	21	21
(Chinese Taipei) Hsu Y-c (Chinese Taipei) Wu T-j	14	11
(South Korea) Kim S-y (South Korea) Kong H-y	21	21
(India) A Ponnappa (India) N. S Reddy	10	18

Second Round
1	(Japan) Y Fukushima (Japan) S Hirota	21	21
(China) Dong WJ (China) Feng XY	7	12
8	(Japan) M Matsumoto (Japan) W Nagahara	21	21
(South Korea) Kim S-y (South Korea) Kong H-y	14	19

Quarter-finals
1	(Japan) Y Fukushima (Japan) S Hirota	22	16	15
8	(Japan) M Matsumoto (Japan) W Nagahara	20	21	21

==== Section 2 ====
First Round
3	(China) Chen QC (China) Jia YF	21	21
(United States) E Kan (United States) I Zhong	11	13
(Japan) N Fukuman (Japan) K Yonao	11	10
(China) Tang JH (China) Yu XH	21	21
7	(South Korea) Lee S-h (South Korea) Shin S-c	w	/	o
(South Korea) Baek H-n (South Korea) Kim H-r
PFR	(Thailand) T Kaweenuntavong (Thailand) P Khantaruangsakul	15	7
(Bulgaria) G Stoeva (Bulgaria) S Stoeva	21	21

Second Round
3	(China) Chen QC (China) Jia YF	21	15	21
(China) Tang JH (China) Yu XH	14	21	18
7	(South Korea) Lee S-h (South Korea) Shin S-c	4^{r}
(Bulgaria) G Stoeva (Bulgaria) S Stoeva	5

Quarter-finals
3	(China) Chen QC (China) Jia YF	19	21	19
(Bulgaria) G Stoeva (Bulgaria) S Stoeva	21	16	21

=== Bottom half ===
==== Section 3 ====
First Round
(China) Huang DP (China) Li WM	15	15
(China) Cao TW (China) Zheng Y	21	21
(United States) A Lee (United States) S Lee	4	5
5	(Japan) S Tanaka (Japan) K Yonemoto	21	21
(South Korea) Chang Y-n (South Korea) Jung K-e	21	21
(Malaysia) V Hoo K M (Malaysia) Yap C W	19	16
(Germany) J Goliszewski (Germany) L Käpplein	17	15
4	(Indonesia) G Polii (Indonesia) A Rahayu	21	21

Second Round
(China) Cao TW (China) Zheng Y	20	21	14
5	(Japan) S Tanaka (Japan) K Yonemoto	22	15	21
(South Korea) Chang Y-n (South Korea) Jung K-e	22	18
4	(Indonesia) G Polii (Indonesia) A Rahayu	24	21

Quarter-finals
5	(Japan) S Tanaka (Japan) K Yonemoto	19	16
4	(Indonesia) G Polii (Indonesia) A Rahayu	21	21

==== Section 4 ====
First Round
(China) Du Y (China) Li YH	21	21
(England) C Birch (England) L Smith	7	14
(Denmark) M Fruergaard (Denmark) S Thygesen	21	12	21
6	(Thailand) J Kititharakul (Thailand) R Prajongjai	17	21	18
(Indonesia) D D Haris (Indonesia) R A Pradipta	21	21
(Malaysia) Chow M K (Malaysia) Lee M Y	16	17
(Russia) E Bolotova (Russia) A Davletova	9	9
2	(Japan) M Matsutomo (Japan) A Takahashi	21	21

Second Round
(China) Du Y (China) Li YH	18	19
(Denmark) M Fruergaard (Denmark) S Thygesen	21	21
(Indonesia) D D Haris (Indonesia) R A Pradipta	21	13	13
2	(Japan) M Matsutomo (Japan) A Takahashi	19	21	21

Quarter-finals
(Denmark) M Fruergaard (Denmark) S Thygesen	21	14	15
2	(Japan) M Matsutomo (Japan) A Takahashi	16	21	21

== Mixed doubles ==
=== Seeds ===
1. (China) Zheng Siwei / Huang Yaqiong (champions)
2. (China) Wang Yilü / Huang Dongping (semi-finals)
3. (Indonesia) Tontowi Ahmad / Liliyana Natsir (second round)
4. (Hong Kong) Tang Chun Man / Tse Ying Suet (semi-finals)
5. (China) Zhang Nan / Li Yinhui (final)
6. (Denmark) Mathias Christiansen / Christinna Pedersen (quarter-finals)
7. (Malaysia) Goh Soon Huat / Shevon Jemie Lai (first round)
8. (England) Chris Adcock / Gabrielle Adcock (second round)

=== Finals ===
Semi-finals
1	(China) Zheng Siwei (China) Huang Yaqiong	21	21
4	(Hong Kong) Tang Chun Man (Hong Kong) Tse Ying Suet	19	15
5	(China) Zhang Nan (China) Li Yinhui	21	19	21
2	(China) Wang Yilü (China) Huang Dongping	10	21	14

Final
1	(China) Zheng Siwei (China) Huang Yaqiong	21	21
5	(China) Zhang Nan (China) Li Yinhui	16	9

=== Top half ===
==== Section 1 ====
First Round
1	(China) Zheng SW (China) Huang YQ	21	21
(Malaysia) Chan P S (Malaysia) Goh L Y	18	17
(India) S Rankireddy (India) A Ponnappa	21	20	21
(England) M Ellis (England) L Smith	13	22	17
8	(England) C Adcock (England) G Adcock	17	21	21
(Republic of Ireland) S Magee (Republic of Ireland) C Magee	21	8	8
(Indonesia) P Jordan (Indonesia) M D Oktavianti	11	13
(Thailand) D Puavaranukroh (Thailand) S Taerattanachai	21	21

Second Round
1	(China) Zheng SW (China) Huang YQ	21	21
(India) S Rankireddy (India) A Ponnappa	14	11
8	(England) C Adcock (England) G Adcock	21	23	16
(Thailand) D Puavaranukroh (Thailand) S Taerattanachai	17	25	21

Quarter-finals
1	(China) Zheng SW (China) Huang YQ	17	21	21
(Thailand) D Puavaranukroh (Thailand) S Taerattanachai	21	14	19

==== Section 2 ====
First Round
4	(Hong Kong) Tang C M (Hong Kong) Tse Y S	21	21
PFR	(Russia) R Alimov (Russia) A Davletova	14	19
(Malaysia) Tan K M (Malaysia) Lai P J	22	21
(Denmark) N Nøhr (Denmark) S Thygesen	20	18
7	(Malaysia) Goh S H (Malaysia) S J Lai	15	21	16
(Indonesia) R Karanda Suwardi (Indonesia) D Susanto	21	19	21
(Germany) M Lamsfuß (Germany) I Herttrich	12	29
(China) Lu K (China) Chen L	21	30

Second Round
4	(Hong Kong) Tang C M (Hong Kong) Tse Y S	19	21	24
(Malaysia) Tan K M (Malaysia) Lai P J	21	16	22
(Indonesia) R Karanda Suwardi (Indonesia) D Susanto	21	21
(China) Lu K (China) Chen L	18	19

Quarter-finals
4	(Hong Kong) Tang C M (Hong Kong) Tse Y S	21	21
(Indonesia) R Karanda Suwardi (Indonesia) D Susanto	15	11

=== Bottom half ===
==== Section 3 ====
First Round
(Vietnam) Đỗ T Đ (Vietnam) Phạm N T	21	17	21
(Russia) E Dremin (Russia) E Dimova	14	21	9
(Netherlands) R Tabeling (Netherlands) C Seinen	13	22	14
5	(China) Zhang N (China) Li YH	21	20	21
(Japan) Y Watanabe (Japan) A Higashino	22	16	21
(Indonesia) H Faizal (Indonesia) G E Widjaja	20	21	16
(Japan) Y Kaneko (Japan) M Matsutomo	7	16
3	(Indonesia) T Ahmad (Indonesia) L Natsir	21	21

Second Round
(Vietnam) Đỗ T Đ (Vietnam) Phạm N T	5	10
5	(China) Zhang N (China) Li YH	21	21
(Japan) Y Watanabe (Japan) A Higashino	21	14	21
3	(Indonesia) T Ahmad (Indonesia) L Natsir	12	21	12

Quarter-finals
5	(China) Zhang N (China) Li YH	21	21
(Japan) Y Watanabe (Japan) A Higashino	18	13

==== Section 4 ====
First Round
(India) P Chopra (India) N. S Reddy	21	21
(Germany) M E Seidel (Germany) L Efler	19	17
(Chinese Taipei) Wang C-l (Chinese Taipei) Lee C-h	10	10
6	(Denmark) M Christiansen (Denmark) C Pedersen	21	21
(China) He JT (China) Du Y	21	21
(Chinese Taipei) Lee Y (Chinese Taipei) Hsu Y-c	16	11
PFR	(Japan) T Hoki (Japan) K Yonemoto	17	12
2	(China) Wang YL (China) Huang DP	21	21

Second Round
(India) P Chopra (India) N. S Reddy	16	10
6	(Denmark) M Christiansen (Denmark) C Pedersen	21	21
(China) He JT (China) Du Y	19	9
2	(China) Wang YL (China) Huang DP	21	21

Quarter-finals
6	(Denmark) M Christiansen (Denmark) C Pedersen	22	21	26
2	(China) Wang YL (China) Huang DP	24	13	28

Preceded by 2018 Japan Open	BWF World Tour; 2018 BWF season	Succeeded by 2018 Bangka Belitung Indonesia Masters
