= 2018 Korea Open (badminton) =

2018 badminton tournament in Seoul

Tournament details
- Dates: 25–30 September
- Level: Super 500
- Total prize money: US$600,000
- Venue: SK Handball Stadium
- Location: Seoul, South Korea

Champions
- Men's singles: (Chinese Taipei) Chou Tien-chen
- Women's singles: (Japan) Nozomi Okuhara
- Men's doubles: (Japan) Hiroyuki Endo (Japan) Yuta Watanabe
- Women's doubles: (Japan) Misaki Matsutomo (Japan) Ayaka Takahashi
- Mixed doubles: (China) He Jiting (China) Du Yue

The 2018 Korea Open (officially known as the Victor Korea Open 2018 for sponsorship reasons) was a badminton tournament that took place at the SK Handball Stadium in Seoul, South Korea, from 25 to 30 September 2018 and had a total prize of $600,000.

== Tournament ==
The 2018 Korea Open was the eighteenth tournament of the 2018 BWF World Tour and also part of the Korea Open championships, which has been held since 1991. This tournament was organized by the Badminton Korea Association and sanctioned by the BWF.

=== Venue ===
This tournament was held at the SK Handball Stadium in Seoul, South Korea.

=== Point distribution ===
Below is the point distribution table for each phase of the tournament based on the BWF points system for the BWF World Tour Super 500 event.

Winner	Runner-up	3/4	5/8	9/16	17/32	33/64	65/128
9,200	7,800	6,420	5,040	3,600	2,220	880	430

=== Prize money ===
The total prize money for this tournament was US$600,000. Distribution of prize money was in accordance with BWF regulations.

Event	Winner	Finals	Semi-finals	Quarter-finals	Last 16
Singles	$45,000	$22,800	$8,700	$3,600	$2,100
Doubles	$47,400	$22,800	$8,400	$4,350	$2,250

== Men's singles ==
=== Seeds ===
1. (Denmark) Viktor Axelsen (second round)
2. (Japan) Kento Momota (quarter-finals)
3. (South Korea) Son Wan-ho (second round)
4. (Chinese Taipei) Chou Tien-chen (champion)
5. (India) Srikanth Kidambi (withdrew)
6. (Japan) Kenta Nishimoto (semi-finals)
7. (Indonesia) Anthony Sinisuka Ginting (quarter-finals)
8. (Indonesia) Tommy Sugiarto (final)

=== Finals ===
Semi-finals
(Indonesia) Jonatan Christie	13	20
8	(Indonesia) Tommy Sugiarto	21	22
4	(Chinese Taipei) Chou Tien-chen	19	21	21
6	(Japan) Kenta Nishimoto	21	18	14

Final
8	(Indonesia) Tommy Sugiarto	13	16
4	(Chinese Taipei) Chou Tien-chen	21	21

=== Top half ===
==== Section 1 ====
First Round
1	(Denmark) V Axelsen	21	21
(Chinese Taipei) Hsu J-h	9	12
(Denmark) H-K Vittinghus	13	21	17
Q1	(China) Zhao JP	21	13	21
PFQ	(Hong Kong) Hu Y	21	21
(China) Huang YX	15	19
(Indonesia) J Christie	21	21
(Japan) K Tsuneyama	18	16

Second Round
1	(Denmark) V Axelsen	25	9
Q1	(China) Zhao JP	27	21
PFQ	(Hong Kong) Hu Y	12	14
(Indonesia) J Christie	21	21

Quarter-finals
Q1	(China) Zhao JP	17	16
(Indonesia) J Christie	21	21

==== Section 2 ====
First Round
3	(South Korea) Son W-h	21	21
(Hong Kong) Lee C Y	16	17
Q3	(South Korea) Heo K-h	21	21
(South Korea) Lee D-k	10	18
8	(Indonesia) T Sugiarto	21	21
(South Korea) Lee H-i	9	16
(Malaysia) Liew D	15	21	21
Q2	(China) Zhou ZQ	21	10	17

Second Round
3	(South Korea) Son W-h	21	13	22
Q3	(South Korea) Heo K-h	15	21	24
8	(Indonesia) T Sugiarto	21	21
(Malaysia) Liew D	15	16

Quarter-finals
Q3	(South Korea) Heo K-h	21	19	9
8	(Indonesia) T Sugiarto	15	21	21

=== Bottom half ===
==== Section 3 ====
First Round
(Chinese Taipei) Wang T-w	21	21
(Thailand) T Saensomboonsuk	18	15
(France) L Corvée	18	10
7	(Indonesia) A S Ginting	21	21
(Japan) K Sakai	9	21	21
(France) B Leverdez	21	16	13
(Indonesia) I M Mustofa	18	14
4	(Chinese Taipei) Chou T-c	21	21

Second Round
(Chinese Taipei) Wang T-w	18	18
7	(Indonesia) A S Ginting	21	21
(Japan) K Sakai	19	17
4	(Chinese Taipei) Chou T-c	21	21

Quarter-finals
7	(Indonesia) A S Ginting	13	11
4	(Chinese Taipei) Chou T-c	21	21

==== Section 4 ====
First Round
(China) Lin D	19	21	21
(Denmark) J Ø. Jørgensen	21	17	15
Q4	(Chinese Taipei) Lin Y-h	23	11	21
6	(Japan) K Nishimoto	21	21	23
(Denmark) A Antonsen	15	21	21
(India) S Verma	21	16	7
PFQ	(Malaysia) Chong W F	16	17
2	(Japan) K Momota	21	21

Second Round
(China) Lin D	21	16	11
6	(Japan) K Nishimoto	10	21	21
(Denmark) A Antonsen	18	22	16
2	(Japan) K Momota	21	20	21

Quarter-finals
6	(Japan) K Nishimoto	w	/	o
2	(Japan) K Momota

== Women's singles ==
=== Seeds ===
1. (Japan) Akane Yamaguchi (semi-finals)
2. (Thailand) Ratchanok Intanon (second round)
3. (Japan) Nozomi Okuhara (champion)
4. (South Korea) Sung Ji-hyun (semi-finals)
5. (India) Saina Nehwal (quarter-finals)
6. (United States) Zhang Beiwen (final)
7. (Japan) Sayaka Takahashi (quarter-finals)
8. (China) Gao Fangjie (quarter-finals)

=== Finals ===
Semi-finals
1	(Japan) Akane Yamaguchi	21	17	14
3	(Japan) Nozomi Okuhara	16	21	21
4	(South Korea) Sung Ji-hyun	18	19
6	(United States) Zhang Beiwen	21	21

Final
3	(Japan) Nozomi Okuhara	21	17	21
6	(United States) Zhang Beiwen	10	21	16

=== Top half ===
==== Section 1 ====
First Round
1	(Japan) A Yamaguchi	21	11	21
(China) Han Y	16	21	15
(Denmark) J D Jakobsen	17	8
(China) Chen XX	21	21
8	(China) Gao FJ	21	21	21
Q1	(China) Li XR	18	23	8
(Chinese Taipei) Chiang Y-l	10	13
(Japan) S Kawakami	21	21

Second Round
1	(Japan) A Yamaguchi	24	21	21
(China) Chen XX	26	19	17
8	(China) Gao FJ	10	21	21
(Japan) S Kawakami	21	19	16

Quarter-finals
1	(Japan) A Yamaguchi	21	21
8	(China) Gao FJ	11	15

==== Section 2 ====
First Round
3	(Japan) N Okuhara	21	21
(Chinese Taipei) Lee C-h	9	8
(Hong Kong) Yip P Y	15	21	21
Q3	(Thailand) P Buranaprasertsuk	21	16	12
5	(India) S Nehwal	21	21
(South Korea) Kim H-m	12	11
Q2	(South Korea) Kim G-e	21	14	21
Q4	(South Korea) Lee S-y	10	21	18

Second Round
3	(Japan) N Okuhara	21	21
(Hong Kong) Yip P Y	16	15
5	(India) S Nehwal	21	21
Q2	(South Korea) Kim G-e	18	18

Quarter-finals
3	(Japan) N Okuhara	15	21	22
5	(India) S Nehwal	21	15	20

=== Bottom half ===
==== Section 3 ====
First Round
(Chinese Taipei) Sung S-y	21	9	13
(China) Zhang YM	19	21	21
(Indonesia) L A Mainaky	9	11
7	(Japan) S Takahashi	21	21
(Russia) E Kosetskaya	18	18
(Denmark) L Kjærsfeldt	21	21
(Japan) A Ohori	21	16	13
4	(South Korea) Sung J-h	18	21	21

Second Round
(China) Zhang YM	17	12
7	(Japan) S Takahashi	21	21
(Denmark) L Kjærsfeldt	14	8
4	(South Korea) Sung J-h	21	21

Quarter-finals
7	(Japan) S Takahashi	15	11
4	(South Korea) Sung J-h	21	21

==== Section 4 ====
First Round
(Chinese Taipei) Pai Y-p	26	16	19
(China) Cai YY	24	21	21
(India) V R Jakka	10	9
6	(United States) Zhang BW	21	21
(Canada) M Li	22	14	11
(Scotland) K Gilmour	20	21	21
(Japan) S Sato	9	19
2	(Thailand) R Intanon	21	21

Second Round
(China) Cai YY	21	20	21
6	(United States) Zhang BW	15	22	23
(Scotland) K Gilmour	21	21
2	(Thailand) R Intanon	18	17

Quarter-finals
6	(United States) Zhang BW	21	21
(Scotland) K Gilmour	15	19

== Men's doubles ==
=== Seeds ===
1. (Japan) Takeshi Kamura / Keigo Sonoda (second round)
2. (Denmark) Mathias Boe / Carsten Mogensen (withdrew)
3. (Denmark) Mads Conrad-Petersen / Mads Pieler Kolding (first round)
4. (Japan) Takuto Inoue / Yuki Kaneko (quarter-finals)
5. (Denmark) Kim Astrup / Anders Skaarup Rasmussen (first round)
6. (Chinese Taipei) Chen Hung-ling / Wang Chi-lin (second round)
7. (Chinese Taipei) Liao Min-chun / Su Cheng-heng (second round)
8. (Japan) Hiroyuki Endo / Yuta Watanabe (champions)

=== Finals ===
Semi-finals
(Japan) Takuro Hoki (Japan) Yugo Kobayashi	21	21
Q1	(South Korea) Choi Sol-gyu (South Korea) Seo Seung-jae	11	14
(Malaysia) Chooi Kah Ming (Malaysia) Low Juan Shen	13	12
8	(Japan) Hiroyuki Endo (Japan) Yuta Watanabe	21	21

Final
(Japan) Takuro Hoki (Japan) Yugo Kobayashi	21	15	10
8	(Japan) Hiroyuki Endo (Japan) Yuta Watanabe	9	21	21

=== Top half ===
==== Section 1 ====
First Round
1	(Japan) T Kamura (Japan) K Sonoda	21	21
(China) Han CK (China) Zhou HD	15	14
(South Korea) Kim G-j (South Korea) Lee Y-d	22	21
(Russia) V Ivanov (Russia) I Sozonov	20	16
6	(Chinese Taipei) Chen H-l (Chinese Taipei) Wang C-l	21	21
Q3	(South Korea) Kim J-h (South Korea) Park K-h	10	6
(Japan) T Hoki (Japan) Y Kobayashi	21	21
(United States) P Chew (United States) R Chew	8	14

Second Round
1	(Japan) T Kamura (Japan) K Sonoda	21	10	9
(South Korea) Kim G-j (South Korea) Lee Y-d	18	21	21
6	(Chinese Taipei) Chen H-l (Chinese Taipei) Wang C-l	15	19
(Japan) T Hoki (Japan) Y Kobayashi	21	21

Quarter-finals
(South Korea) Kim G-j (South Korea) Lee Y-d	21	21	15
(Japan) T Hoki (Japan) Y Kobayashi	23	17	21

==== Section 2 ====
First Round
4	(Japan) T Inoue (Japan) Y Kaneko	21	21
(Germany) M Lamsfuß (Germany) M E Seidel	13	18
(Denmark) D Daugaard (Denmark) F Søgaard	21	21
(Indonesia) A B Cahyono (Indonesia) M R P Isfahani	13	12
5	(Denmark) K Astrup (Denmark) A S Rasmussen	21	14	11
(Chinese Taipei) Lee J-h (Chinese Taipei) Lee Y	12	21	21
(Chinese Taipei) Lu C-y (Chinese Taipei) Yang P-h	19	20
Q1	(South Korea) Choi S-g (South Korea) Seo S-j	21	22

Second Round
4	(Japan) T Inoue (Japan) Y Kaneko	21	21
(Denmark) D Daugaard (Denmark) F Søgaard	17	18
(Chinese Taipei) Lee J-h (Chinese Taipei) Lee Y	21	20	12
Q1	(South Korea) Choi S-g (South Korea) Seo S-j	18	22	21

Quarter-finals
4	(Japan) T Inoue (Japan) Y Kaneko	10	15
Q1	(South Korea) Choi S-g (South Korea) Seo S-j	21	21

=== Bottom half ===
==== Section 3 ====
First Round
Q4	(Chinese Taipei) Chang K-c (Chinese Taipei) Lu C-p	17	16
(Malaysia) Chooi K M (Malaysia) Low J S	21	21
(South Korea) Chung E-s (South Korea) Kim D-y	18	21	19
7	(Chinese Taipei) Liao M-c (Chinese Taipei) Su C-h	21	18	21
(Malaysia) M Arif A L (Malaysia) N M Azriyn A	20	21	13
(China) He JT (China) Tan Q	22	18	21
(Thailand) K Kedren (Thailand) D Puavaranukroh	21	21
3	(Denmark) M Conrad-Petersen (Denmark) M P Kolding	15	19

Second Round
(Malaysia) Chooi K M (Malaysia) Low J S	21	21
7	(Chinese Taipei) Liao M-c (Chinese Taipei) Su C-h	19	16
(China) He JT (China) Tan Q	18	16
(Thailand) K Kedren (Thailand) D Puavaranukroh	21	21

Quarter-finals
(Malaysia) Chooi K M (Malaysia) Low J S	21	14	21
(Thailand) K Kedren (Thailand) D Puavaranukroh	19	21	15

==== Section 4 ====
First Round
(South Korea) Kang M-h (South Korea) Kim W-h	13	18
(China) Ou XY (China) Ren XY	21	21
Q2	(Chinese Taipei) Lee F-c (Chinese Taipei) Lee F-j	24	18
8	(Japan) H Endo (Japan) Y Watanabe	26	21
(Thailand) B Isara (Thailand) M Jongjit	22	24
(Malaysia) A Chia (Malaysia) Soh W Y	24	26
(China) Huang KX (China) Wang ZK	21	17	23
PFQ	(Chinese Taipei) Lee S-h (Chinese Taipei) Yang P-h	13	21	21

Second Round
(China) Ou XY (China) Ren XY	21	8	18
8	(Japan) H Endo (Japan) Y Watanabe	18	21	21
(Malaysia) A Chia (Malaysia) Soh W Y	21	21
(China) Huang KX (China) Wang ZK	16	11

Quarter-finals
8	(Japan) H Endo (Japan) Y Watanabe	22	21
(Malaysia) A Chia (Malaysia) Soh W Y	20	14

== Women's doubles ==
=== Seeds ===
1. (Japan) Yuki Fukushima / Sayaka Hirota (final)
2. (Japan) Misaki Matsutomo / Ayaka Takahashi (champions)
3. (Indonesia) Greysia Polii / Apriyani Rahayu (withdrew)
4. (Japan) Shiho Tanaka / Koharu Yonemoto (semi-finals)
5. (South Korea) Lee So-hee / Shin Seung-chan (first round)
6. (Japan) Mayu Matsumoto / Wakana Nagahara (quarter-finals)
7. (Indonesia) Della Destiara Haris / Rizki Amelia Pradipta (second round)
8. (China) Du Yue / Li Yinhui (quarter-finals)

=== Finals ===
Semi-finals
1	(Japan) Yuki Fukushima (Japan) Sayaka Hirota	21	21
(Japan) Naoko Fukuman (Japan) Kurumi Yonao	15	12
4	(Japan) Shiho Tanaka (Japan) Koharu Yonemoto	10	11
2	(Japan) Misaki Matsutomo (Japan) Ayaka Takahashi	21	21

Final
1	(Japan) Yuki Fukushima (Japan) Sayaka Hirota	11	18
2	(Japan) Misaki Matsutomo (Japan) Ayaka Takahashi	21	21

=== Top half ===
==== Section 1 ====
First Round
1	(Japan) Y Fukushima (Japan) S Hirota	21	21
(Chinese Taipei) Chang C-h (Chinese Taipei) Yang C-t	14	10
Q1
(Germany) L Efler (Germany) I Herttrich	w	/	o
5	(South Korea) Lee S-h (South Korea) Shin S-c	1^{r}
(Malaysia) Chow M K (Malaysia) Lee M Y	5
(Germany) J Goliszewski (Germany) L Käpplein	10	12
(South Korea) Chang Y-n (South Korea) Jung K-e	21	21

Second Round
1	(Japan) Y Fukushima (Japan) S Hirota	21	21
(Germany) L Efler (Germany) I Herttrich	14	11
(Malaysia) Chow M K (Malaysia) Lee M Y	21	18	21
(South Korea) Chang Y-n (South Korea) Jung K-e	13	21	14

Quarter-finals
1	(Japan) Y Fukushima (Japan) S Hirota	21	21
(Malaysia) Chow M K (Malaysia) Lee M Y	13	14

==== Section 2 ====
First Round
PFQ	(Malaysia) Vivian Hoo K M (Malaysia) Yap C W	21	21
(United States) E Kan (United States) I Zhong	14	12
(Indonesia) A S Awanda (Indonesia) N K M Istarani	21	14	22
PFQ	(Chinese Taipei) Chang H-t (Chinese Taipei) Cheng C-y	15	21	20
7	(Indonesia) D D Haris (Indonesia) R A Pradipta	21	21
(South Korea) Choi H-i (South Korea) Kim M-j	12	17
(Japan) N Fukuman (Japan) K Yonao	13	22	21
(Thailand) S Paewsampran (Thailand) P Supajirakul	21	20	15

Second Round
PFQ	(Malaysia) Vivian Hoo K M (Malaysia) Yap C W	19	21	18
(Indonesia) A S Awanda (Indonesia) N K M Istarani	21	19	21
7	(Indonesia) D D Haris (Indonesia) R A Pradipta	19	22	19
(Japan) N Fukuman (Japan) K Yonao	21	20	21

Quarter-finals
(Indonesia) A S Awanda (Indonesia) N K M Istarani	21	14	12
(Japan) N Fukuman (Japan) K Yonao	19	21	21

=== Bottom half ===
==== Section 3 ====
First Round
(Chinese Taipei) Hsu Y-c (Chinese Taipei) Wu T-j	21	21	21
PFQ	(Chinese Taipei) Chen S-y (Chinese Taipei) Sung S-y	16	23	10
(South Korea) Kim H-j (South Korea) Kong H-y	8	21	17
8	(China) Du Y (China) Li YH	21	19	21
(China) Tang JH (China) Yu XH	24	21
(Hong Kong) Ng W Y (Hong Kong) Yeung N T	22	15
(China) Cao TW (China) Zheng Y	15	21	11
4	(Japan) S Tanaka (Japan) K Yonemoto	21	15	21

Second Round
(Chinese Taipei) Hsu Y-c (Chinese Taipei) Wu T-j	14	18
8	(China) Du Y (China) Li YH	21	21
(China) Tang JH (China) Yu XH	21	15	14
4	(Japan) S Tanaka (Japan) K Yonemoto	12	21	21

Quarter-finals
8	(China) Du Y (China) Li YH	14	15
4	(Japan) S Tanaka (Japan) K Yonemoto	21	21

==== Section 4 ====
First Round
Q3
PFQ	(Chinese Taipei) Peng L-t (Chinese Taipei) Yu C-h	w	/	o
Q4
6	(Japan) M Matsumoto (Japan) W Nagahara	w	/	o
(South Korea) Lee Y-n (South Korea) Seong A-y	w	/	o
Q2
(South Korea) Chae Y-j (South Korea) Kim S-y	17	21	10
2	(Japan) M Matsutomo (Japan) A Takahashi	21	19	21

Second Round
PFQ	(Chinese Taipei) Peng L-t (Chinese Taipei) Yu C-h	12	7
6	(Japan) M Matsumoto (Japan) W Nagahara	21	21
(South Korea) Lee Y-n (South Korea) Seong A-y	17	9
2	(Japan) M Matsutomo (Japan) A Takahashi	21	21

Quarter-finals
6	(Japan) M Matsumoto (Japan) W Nagahara	17	15
2	(Japan) M Matsutomo (Japan) A Takahashi	21	21

== Mixed doubles ==
=== Seeds ===
1. (China) Zheng Siwei / Huang Yaqiong (first round)
2. (Denmark) Mathias Christiansen / Christinna Pedersen (final)
3. (England) Chris Adcock / Gabrielle Adcock (second round)
4. (Indonesia) Hafiz Faizal / Gloria Emanuelle Widjaja (quarter-finals)
5. (China) He Jiting / Du Yue (champions)
6. (Chinese Taipei) Wang Chi-lin / Lee Chia-hsin (second round)
7. (Japan) Yuta Watanabe / Arisa Higashino (quarter-finals)
8. (Thailand) Dechapol Puavaranukroh / Sapsiree Taerattanachai (semi-finals)

=== Finals ===
Semi-finals
8	(Thailand) Dechapol Puavaranukroh (Thailand) Sapsiree Taerattanachai	19	11
5	(China) He Jiting (China) Du Yue	21	21
(South Korea) Seo Seung-jae (South Korea) Chae Yoo-jung	22	13	15
2	(Denmark) Mathias Christiansen (Denmark) Christinna Pedersen	20	21	21

Final
5	(China) He Jiting (China) Du Yue	21	21
2	(Denmark) Mathias Christiansen (Denmark) Christinna Pedersen	18	16

=== Top half ===
==== Section 1 ====
First Round
1	(China) Zheng SW (China) Huang YQ	5^{r}
(Hong Kong) Chang T C (Hong Kong) Ng W Y	11
Q1	(South Korea) Kim Y-h (South Korea) Seong A-y	21	21
(Malaysia) M Arif A L (Indonesia) R A Riodingin	19	18
8	(Thailand) D Puavaranukroh (Thailand) S Taerattanachai	17	21	21
(South Korea) Choi S-g (South Korea) Shin S-c	21	15	16
(Indonesia) R Rivaldy (Indonesia) P H Mentari	18	13
(Japan) Y Kaneko (Japan) M Matsutomo	21	21

Second Round
(Hong Kong) Chang T C (Hong Kong) Ng W Y	21	21
Q1	(South Korea) Kim Y-h (South Korea) Seong A-y	16	16
8	(Thailand) D Puavaranukroh (Thailand) S Taerattanachai	21	19	23
(Japan) Y Kaneko (Japan) M Matsutomo	18	21	21

Quarter-finals
(Hong Kong) Chang T C (Hong Kong) Ng W Y	9	17
8	(Thailand) D Puavaranukroh (Thailand) S Taerattanachai	21	21

==== Section 2 ====
First Round
4	(Indonesia) H Faizal (Indonesia) G E Widjaja	21	21
Q2	(Chinese Taipei) Lee F-c (Chinese Taipei) Chang C-h	15	11
(China) Ou XY (China) Tang JH	10	21
(Indonesia) P Jordan (Indonesia) M D Oktavianti	21	23
5	(China) He JT (China) Du Y	21	21	21
Q3	(Thailand) S Jomkoh (Thailand) P Supajirakul	14	23	15
(Indonesia) R Alexander (Indonesia) A Saufika	20	17
(South Korea) Kim H-t (South Korea) Kim H-j	22	21

Second Round
4	(Indonesia) H Faizal (Indonesia) G E Widjaja	21	20	21
(Indonesia) P Jordan (Indonesia) M D Oktavianti	16	22	13
5	(China) He JT (China) Du Y	21	21
(South Korea) Kim H-t (South Korea) Kim H-j	13	15

Quarter-finals
4	(Indonesia) H Faizal (Indonesia) G E Widjaja	14	10
5	(China) He JT (China) Du Y	21	21

=== Bottom half ===
==== Section 3 ====
First Round
(Germany) M E Seidel (Germany) L Efler	21	8	18
(South Korea) Kim W-h (South Korea) Baek H-n	18	21	21
(Germany) M Lamsfuß (Germany) I Herttrich	21	15	11
7	(Japan) Y Watanabe (Japan) A Higashino	17	21	21
(South Korea) Seo S-j (South Korea) Chae Y-j	21	21
(China) Ren XY (China) Cao TW	16	15
Q4	(Chinese Taipei) Lee F-j (Chinese Taipei) Chang H-t	14	12
3	(England) C Adcock (England) G Adcock	21	21

Second Round
(South Korea) Kim W-h (South Korea) Baek H-n	10	16
7	(Japan) Y Watanabe (Japan) A Higashino	21	21
(South Korea) Seo S-j (South Korea) Chae Y-j	25	21
3	(England) C Adcock (England) G Adcock	23	13

Quarter-finals
7	(Japan) Y Watanabe (Japan) A Higashino	16	16
(South Korea) Seo S-j (South Korea) Chae Y-j	21	21

==== Section 4 ====
First Round
(China) Lu K (China) Chen Lu	18	19
(Chinese Taipei) Lee Y (Chinese Taipei) Hsu Y-c	21	21
PFQ	(Japan) T Hoki (Japan) K Yonemoto	15	19
6	(Chinese Taipei) Wang C-l (Chinese Taipei) Lee C-h	21	21
(Malaysia) Chen T J (Malaysia) Peck Y W	17	21	21
(Chinese Taipei) Chang K-c (Chinese Taipei) Cheng C-y	21	14	17
(Hong Kong) Mak H C (Hong Kong) Yeung N T	15	15
2	(Denmark) M Christiansen (Denmark) C Pedersen	21	21

Second Round
(Chinese Taipei) Lee Y (Chinese Taipei) Hsu Y-c	19	21	21
6	(Chinese Taipei) Wang C-l (Chinese Taipei) Lee C-h	21	15	15
(Malaysia) Chen T J (Malaysia) Peck Y W	13	20
2	(Denmark) M Christiansen (Denmark) C Pedersen	21	22

Quarter-finals
(Chinese Taipei) Lee Y (Chinese Taipei) Hsu Y-c	15	14
2	(Denmark) M Christiansen (Denmark) C Pedersen	21	21

Preceded by 2018 Bangka Belitung Indonesia Masters	BWF World Tour; 2018 BWF season	Succeeded by 2018 Chinese Taipei Open
