= 2012 Japan Super Series =

Tournament details
- Dates: 18–23 September
- Level: Super Series
- Total prize money: US$200,000
- Venue: Yoyogi National Gymnasium
- Location: Tokyo, Japan

Champions
- Men's singles: (Malaysia) Lee Chong Wei
- Women's singles: (Chinese Taipei) Tai Tzu-ying
- Men's doubles: (South Korea) Kim Gi-jung (South Korea) Kim Sa-rang
- Women's doubles: (Hong Kong) Poon Lok Yan (Hong Kong) Tse Ying Suet
- Mixed doubles: (Malaysia) Chan Peng Soon (Malaysia) Goh Liu Ying

The 2012 Japan Super Series was the eighth super series tournament of the 2012 BWF Super Series in badminton. The tournament was held in Tokyo, Japan, from 18 to 23 September 2012 and had a total purse of $200,000. Draw was released on 4 September 2012. China withdrew all its players from this tournament because of safety fears.

== Men's singles ==
=== Seeds ===
1. (Malaysia) Lee Chong Wei (champion)
2. (Denmark) Peter Gade (first round)
3. (Indonesia) Simon Santoso (semifinals)
4. (Japan) Sho Sasaki (second round)
5. (Japan) Kenichi Tago (first round)
6. (Denmark) Jan Ø. Jørgensen (first round)
7. (Indonesia) Taufik Hidayat (quarterfinals)
8. (Vietnam) Nguyen Tien Minh (quarterfinals)

=== Players by nation ===
| Nation | First round | Second round | Quarterfinals | Semifinals | Final |
|---|---|---|---|---|---|
| (Malaysia) | 3 | 3 | 2 | 1 | 1 |
| (Thailand) | 3 | 2 | 1 | 1 | 1 |
| (Indonesia) | 3 | 2 | 2 | 1 | |
| (Hong Kong) | 3 | 2 | 1 | 1 | |
| (Japan) | 5 | 4 | 1 | | |
| (Vietnam) | 1 | 1 | 1 | | |
| (India) | 5 | 1 | | | |
| (Denmark) | 4 | 1 | | | |
| (Chinese Taipei) | 2 | | | | |
| (England) | 1 | | | | |
| (France) | 1 | | | | |
| (Singapore) | 1 | | | | |

=== Top half ===
First Round
1 | (Malaysia) Lee C W | 21 | 21
(India) A Pawar | 13 | 9
(Thailand) S Avihingsanon | 13 | 21 | 19
(Denmark) V Axelsen | 21 | 19 | 21
(India) A Jayaram | 21 | 21
Q2 | (Singapore) Z L D Wong | 14 | 14
(Malaysia) Chong W F | 8 | 21 | 21
5 | (Japan) K Tago | 21 | 16 | 17
7 | (Indonesia) T Hidayat | 21 | 21
(India) Parupalli K | 18 | 18
Q4 | (Japan) A Koga | 13 | 21 | 21
(Denmark) H-K Vittinghus | 21 | 15 | 13
(Hong Kong) Chan Y K | 17 | 21 | 15
(Thailand) T Saensomboonsuk | 21 | 12 | 21
(Chinese Taipei) Hsu J-h | 15 | 11
3 | (Indonesia) S Santoso | 21 | 21

Second Round
1 | (Malaysia) Lee C W | 21 | 21
(Denmark) V Axelsen | 10 | 12
(India) A Jayaram | 16 | 16
(Malaysia) Chong W F | 21 | 21
7 | (Indonesia) T Hidayat | 21 | 21
Q4 | (Japan) A Koga | 11 | 10
(Thailand) T Saensomboonsuk | 8 | 11
3 | (Indonesia) S Santoso | 21 | 21

Quarterfinals
1 | (Malaysia) Lee C W | 21 | 21
(Malaysia) Chong W F | 15 | 15
7 | (Indonesia) T Hidayat | 9 | 14
3 | (Indonesia) S Santoso | 21 | 21

Semifinals
1 | (Malaysia) Lee C W | 21 | 21
3 | (Indonesia) S Santoso | 7 | 17

=== Bottom half ===
First Round
4 | (Japan) S Sasaki | 21 | 21
(India) Gurusai Datt | 18 | 15
(Indonesia) S D Kuncoro | 21 | 17 | 18
(Thailand) B Ponsana | 14 | 21 | 21
(Hong Kong) Wong W K | 21 | 21
(England) R Ouseph | 11 | 17
Q1 | (Japan) K Sakai | 24 | 21
6 | (Denmark) J Ø Jørgensen | 22 | 19
8 | (Vietnam) Nguyen T M | 21 | 21
(France) B Leverdez | 19 | 19
Q3 | (India) Sai Praneeth B. | 21 | 15 | 20
(Malaysia) D Liew | 17 | 21 | 22
(Japan) T Ueda | 21 | 21
(Chinese Taipei) Chou T-c | 16 | 6
(Hong Kong) Hu Y | 21 | 22
2 | (Denmark) P Gade | 11 | 20

Second Round
4 | (Japan) S Sasaki | 12 | 12
(Thailand) B Ponsana | 21 | 21
(Hong Kong) Wong W K | 21 | 18 | 14
Q1 | (Japan) K Sakai | 19 | 21 | 21
8 | (Vietnam) Nguyen T M | 21 | 21 | 21
(Malaysia) D Liew | 14 | 23 | 16
(Japan) T Ueda | 12 | 10
(Hong Kong) Hu Y | 21 | 21

Quarterfinals
(Thailand) B Ponsana | 21 | 21
Q1 | (Japan) K Sakai | 9 | 6
8 | (Vietnam) Nguyen T M | 22 | 15
(Hong Kong) Hu Y | 24 | 21

Semifinals
(Thailand) B Ponsana | 21 | 17 | 21
(Hong Kong) Hu Y | 17 | 21 | 19

=== Finals ===
Semifinals
1 | (Malaysia) Lee Chong Wei | 21 | 21
3 | (Indonesia) Simon Santoso | 7 | 17
(Thailand) Boonsak Ponsana | 21 | 17 | 21
(Hong Kong) Hu Yun | 17 | 21 | 19

Final
1 | (Malaysia) Lee Chong Wei | 21 | 21
(Thailand) Boonsak Ponsana | 18 | 18

== Women's singles ==
=== Seeds ===
1. (Denmark) Tine Baun (quarterfinals)
2. (South Korea) Sung Ji-hyun (semifinals)
3. (Thailand) Ratchanok Inthanon (quarterfinals)
4. (South Korea) Bae Youn-joo (quarterfinals)
5. (Chinese Taipei) Tai Tzu-ying (champion)
6. (Thailand) Porntip Buranaprasertsuk (semifinals)
7. (Singapore) Gu Juan (first round)
8. (Japan) Ai Goto (quarterfinals)

=== Top half ===
First Round
1 | (Denmark) T Baun | 21 | 21
(Malaysia) S Saniru | 11 | 10
(Thailand) B Ongbumrungpan | 21 | 21
(Hong Kong) Chan T K | 14 | 19
(Thailand) N Jindapon | 23 | 21
Q2 | (Japan) E Tamaki | 21 | 6
(Canada) N Grether | 10 | 21 | 9
6 | (Thailand) P Buranaprasertsuk | 21 | 18 | 21
7 | (Singapore) Gu J | 16 | 17
(Japan) M Mitani | 21 | 21
(Hong Kong) Yip P Y | 21 | 12 | 13
(Japan) E Hirose | 11 | 21 | 21
(India) P.V. Sindhu | 21 | 17 | 21
(Japan) K Imabeppu | 18 | 21 | 13
(Canada) C Reid | 11 | 9
4 | (South Korea) Bae Y-j | 21 | 21

Second Round
1 | (Denmark) T Baun | 21 | 21
(Thailand) B Ongbumrungpan | 14 | 7
(Thailand) N Jindapon | 21 | 12 | 20
6 | (Thailand) P Buranaprasertsuk | 13 | 21 | 22
(Japan) M Mitani | 21 | 15 | 20
(Japan) E Hirose | 11 | 21 | 22
(India) P.V. Sindhu | 21 | 12 | 18
4 | (South Korea) Bae Y-j | 10 | 21 | 21

Quarterfinals
1 | (Denmark) T Baun | 21 | 12 | 18
6 | (Thailand) P Buranaprasertsuk | 17 | 21 | 21
(Japan) E Hirose | 21 | 21
4 | (South Korea) Bae Y-j | 7 | 15

Semifinals
6 | (Thailand) P Buranaprasertsuk | 19 | 13
(Japan) E Hirose | 21 | 21

=== Bottom half ===
First Round
3 | (Thailand) R Inthanon | 21 | 19 | 21
(Japan) S Takahashi | 12 | 21 | 19
(Malaysia) Tee J Y | 16 | 21 | 21
(Chinese Taipei) Pai H-m | 21 | 14 | 12
(Thailand) S Taerattanachai | 21 | 21
(Japan) S Uchida | 16 | 11
Q4 | (Japan) Y Fukushima | 14 | 18
5 | (Chinese Taipei) Tai T-y | 21 | 21
8 | (Japan) A Goto | 21 | 21
(Singapore) Fu MT | 9 | 19
Q1 | (Japan) Y Hashimoto | 19 | 19
(Malaysia) L L Y Cheah | 21 | 21
(Japan) N Okuhara | 21 | 21
Q3 | (Japan) A Yamaguchi | 19 | 10
(Austria) S Prutsch | 6 | 16
2 | (South Korea) Sung J-h | 21 | 21

Second Round
3 | (Thailand) R Inthanon | 21 | 21
(Malaysia) Tee J Y | 11 | 10
(Thailand) S Taerattanachai | 13 | 17
5 | (Chinese Taipei) Tai T-y | 21 | 21
8 | (Japan) A Goto | 21 | 15 | 21
(Malaysia) L L Y Cheah | 14 | 21 | 18
(Japan) N Okuhara | 15 | 17
2 | (South Korea) Sung J-h | 21 | 21

Quarterfinals
3 | (Thailand) R Inthanon | 16 | 16
5 | (Chinese Taipei) Tai T-y | 21 | 21
8 | (Japan) A Goto | 21 | 16 | 14
2 | (South Korea) Sung J-h | 12 | 21 | 21

Semifinals
5 | (Chinese Taipei) Tai T-y | 16 | 21 | 21
2 | (South Korea) Sung J-h | 21 | 13 | 17

=== Finals ===
Semifinals
6 | (Thailand) Porntip Buranaprasertsuk | 19 | 13
(Japan) Eriko Hirose | 21 | 21
5 | (Chinese Taipei) Tai Tzu-ying | 16 | 21 | 21
2 | (South Korea) Sung Ji-hyun | 21 | 13 | 17

Final
(Japan) Eriko Hirose | 21 | 9 | 14
5 | (Chinese Taipei) Tai Tzu-ying | 9 | 21 | 21

== Men's doubles ==
=== Seeds ===
1. (Denmark) Mathias Boe / Carsten Mogensen (second round)
2. (Malaysia) Koo Kien Keat / Tan Boon Heong (final)
3. (Japan) Hiroyuki Endo / Kenichi Hayakawa (quarterfinals)
4. (Japan) Hirokatsu Hashimoto / Noriyasu Hirata (quarterfinals)
5. (Japan) Naoki Kawamae / Shoji Sato (quarterfinals)
6. (Thailand) Bodin Issara / Maneepong Jongjit (first round)
7. (South Korea) Kim Gi-jung / Kim Sa-rang (champion)
8. (Malaysia) Hoon Thien How / Tan Wee Kiong (semifinals)

=== Top half ===
First Round
(Japan) A Koga (Japan) T Saito | 16 | 16
(Indonesia) Y S Dasuki (Indonesia) H A Gunawan | 21 | 21
6 | (Thailand) B Issara (Thailand) M Jongjit | 14 | 21 | 17
(Japan) H Saeki (Japan) R Taohata | 21 | 15 | 21
(Philippines) P J Escueta (Philippines) M P Gabriel | 26 | 19
(Singapore) Yong Z A C (Singapore) D Wong | 28 | 21
(Japan) T Inoue (Japan) Y Kaneko | 13 | 15
(Indonesia) A Y Chandra (Indonesia) M Kido | 21 | 21
7 | (South Korea) Kim G-j (South Korea) Kim S-r | 21 | 21
(Chinese Taipei) Chen H-l (Chinese Taipei) Lu C-p | 14 | 13
(Japan) T Kamura (Japan) K Sonoda | 21 | 21
(Chinese Taipei) Liang J-w (Chinese Taipei) Liao K-h | 10 | 12

Second Round
1 | (Denmark) M Boe (Denmark) C Mogensen | 16 | 21 | 19
(Indonesia) Y S Dasuki (Indonesia) H A Gunawan | 21 | 13 | 21
(Japan) H Saeki (Japan) R Taohata | 21 | 21
(Singapore) Yong Z A C (Singapore) D Wong | 12 | 15
3 | (Japan) H Endo (Japan) K Hayakawa | 17 | 21 | 21
(Indonesia) A Y Chandra (Indonesia) M Kido | 21 | 15 | 9
7 | (South Korea) Kim G-j (South Korea) Kim S-r | 21 | 21
(Japan) T Kamura (Japan) K Sonoda | 15 | 16

Quarterfinals
(Indonesia) Y S Dasuki (Indonesia) H A Gunawan | 18 | 22
(Japan) H Saeki (Japan) R Taohata | 21 | 24
3 | (Japan) H Endo (Japan) K Hayakawa | 17 | 21 | 17
7 | (South Korea) Kim G-j (South Korea) Kim S-r | 21 | 19 | 21

Semifinals
(Japan) H Saeki (Japan) R Taohata | 9 | 8
7 | (South Korea) Kim G-j (South Korea) Kim S-r | 21 | 21

=== Bottom half ===
First Round
(England) C Adcock (England) A Ellis | 21 | 21
(Chinese Taipei) Chen C-j (Chinese Taipei) Lin Y-j | 14 | 12
(India) P J Chopra (India) A Dewalkar | 16 | 13
8 | (Malaysia) Hoon T H (Malaysia) Tan W K | 21 | 21
(Philippines) R Estanislao (Philippines) P J Vivas | 15 | 19
(Denmark) R Bonde (Denmark) M Conrad-Petersen | 21 | 21
(Japan) S Hoshino (Japan) A Kobayashi | 21 | 21
(United States) P Chew (United States) S Pongnairat | 10 | 15
(India) K Tarun (India) A Vishnu | 16 | 24
5 | (Japan) N Kawamae (Japan) S Sato | 21 | 26
(Thailand) P Chalardchaleam (Thailand) N Puangpuapech | 22 | 21 | 21
(South Korea) Kang J-w (South Korea) Lee S-j | 24 | 15 | 14

Second Round
(England) C Adcock (England) A Ellis | 11 | 14
8 | (Malaysia) Hoon T H (Malaysia) Tan W K | 21 | 21
(Denmark) R Bonde (Denmark) M Conrad-Petersen | 15 | 21 | 15
4 | (Japan) H Hashimoto (Japan) N Hirata | 21 | 17 | 21
(Japan) S Hoshino (Japan) A Kobayashi | 12 | 8
5 | (Japan) N Kawamae (Japan) S Sato | 21 | 21
(Thailand) P Chalardchaleam (Thailand) N Puangpuapech | 8 | 7
2 | (Malaysia) Koo K K (Malaysia) Tan B H | 21 | 21

Quarterfinals
8 | (Malaysia) Hoon T H (Malaysia) Tan W K | 21 | 21
4 | (Japan) H Hashimoto (Japan) N Hirata | 19 | 11
5 | (Japan) N Kawamae (Japan) S Sato | 10 | 21 | 10
2 | (Malaysia) Koo K K (Malaysia) Tan B H | 21 | 17 | 21

Semifinals
(Malaysia) Hoon T H (Malaysia) Tan W K | 15 | 17
2 | (Malaysia) Koo K K (Malaysia) Tan B H | 21 | 21

=== Finals ===
Semifinals
(Japan) Hiroyuki Saeki (Japan) Ryota Taohata | 9 | 8
7 | (South Korea) Kim Gi-jung (South Korea) Kim Sa-rang | 21 | 21
8 | (Malaysia) Hoon Thien How (Malaysia) Tan Wee Kiong | 15 | 17
2 | (Malaysia) Koo Kien Keat (Malaysia) Tan Boon Heong | 21 | 21

Final
7 | (South Korea) Kim Gi-jung (South Korea) Kim Sa-rang | 21 | 21
2 | (Malaysia) Koo Kien Keat (Malaysia) Tan Boon Heong | 16 | 19

== Women's doubles ==
=== Seeds ===
1. (Japan) Mizuki Fujii / Reika Kakiiwa (second round)
2. (China) Bao Yixin / Zhong Qianxin (withdrew)
3. (Japan) Miyuki Maeda / Satoko Suetsuna (semifinals)
4. (Japan) Shizuka Matsuo / Mami Naito (final)
5. (Japan) Misaki Matsutomo / Ayaka Takahashi (second round)
6. (South Korea) Eom Hye-won / Jang Ye-na (quarterfinals)
7. (Hong Kong) Poon Lok Yan / Tse Ying Suet (champion)
8. (Thailand) Duanganong Aroonkesorn / Kunchala Voravichitchaikul (quarterfinals)

=== Top half ===
First Round
1 | (Japan) M Fujii (Japan) R Kakiiwa
(Japan) K Yonemoto (Japan) Y Miki
7 | (Hong Kong) Poon L Y (Hong Kong) Tse Y S
(Japan) A Ohori (Japan) A Yamaguchi | 17 | 22 | 21
(Thailand) R Chuthabunditkul (Thailand) J Kittiharakul | 21 | 20 | 17
3 | (Japan) M Maeda (Japan) S Suetsuna
(China) Cheng S (China) Luo L
8 | (Thailand) D Aroonkesorn (Thailand) K Voravichitchaikul
(Chinese Taipei) Shuai P-l (Chinese Taipei) Wu T-j | 9 | 8
(Thailand) L Narissapat (Thailand) S Thoungthongkam | 21 | 21

Second Round
1 | (Japan) M Fujii (Japan) R Kakiiwa | 19 | 21 | 17
(Japan) K Yonemoto (Japan) Y Miki | 21 | 14 | 21
7 | (Hong Kong) Poon L Y (Hong Kong) Tse Y S | 18 | 21 | 21
(Japan) A Ohori (Japan) A Yamaguchi | 21 | 13 | 8
3 | (Japan) M Maeda (Japan) S Suetsuna | w/o
(China) Cheng S (China) Luo L
8 | (Thailand) D Aroonkesorn (Thailand) K Voravichitchaikul | 22 | 12 | 21
(Thailand) L Narissapat (Thailand) S Thoungthongkam | 20 | 21 | 13

Quarterfinals
(Japan) K Yonemoto (Japan) Y Miki | 21 | 14 | 6
7 | (Hong Kong) Poon L Y (Hong Kong) Tse Y S | 19 | 21 | 21
3 | (Japan) M Maeda (Japan) S Suetsuna | 21 | 21
8 | (Thailand) D Aroonkesorn (Thailand) K Voravichitchaikul | 9 | 9

Semifinals
7 | (Hong Kong) Poon L Y (Hong Kong) Tse Y S | 16 | 21 | 21
3 | (Japan) M Maeda (Japan) S Suetsuna | 21 | 8 | 18

=== Bottom half ===
First Round
(Malaysia) Ng H E (Malaysia) Ng H L | 22 | 21
(United States) E Lee (United States) P L Obanana | 20 | 18
6 | (South Korea) Eom H-w (South Korea) Jang Y-n
(Japan) A Kugo (Japan) M Yokoyama | 22 | 19 | 22
(Thailand) S Amitrapai (Thailand) S Taerattanachai | 20 | 21 | 20
4 | (Japan) S Matsuo (Japan) M Naito
(South Korea) Choi H-i (South Korea) Kim S-y | 21 | 21
(Canada) N Grether (Canada) C Reid | 10 | 10
5 | (Japan) M Matsutomo (Japan) A Takahashi
(Japan) N Fukuman (Japan) K Yonao
2 | (China) Bao YX (China) Zhong QX

Second Round
(Malaysia) Ng H E (Malaysia) Ng H L | 17 | 29 | 10
6 | (South Korea) Eom H-w (South Korea) Jang Y-n | 21 | 27 | 21
(Japan) K Asumi (Japan) M Yokoyama | 12 | 21 | 16
4 | (Japan) S Matsuo (Japan) M Naito | 21 | 16 | 21
(South Korea) Choi H-i (South Korea) Kim S-y | 21 | 21
5 | (Japan) M Matsutomo (Japan) A Takahashi | 16 | 14
w/o
w/o

Quarterfinals
6 | (South Korea) Eom H-w (South Korea) Jang Y-n | 22 | 21 | 15
4 | (Japan) S Matsuo (Japan) M Naito | 24 | 19 | 21
(South Korea) Choi H-i (South Korea) Kim S-y | w/o

Semifinals
4 | (Japan) S Matsuo (Japan) M Naito | 21 | 21
(South Korea) Choi H-i (South Korea) Kim S-y | 14 | 17

=== Finals ===
Semifinals
7 | (Hong Kong) Poon Lok Yan (Hong Kong) Tse Ying Suet | 16 | 21 | 21
3 | (Japan) Miyuki Maeda (Japan) Satoko Suetsuna | 21 | 8 | 18
4 | (Japan) Shizuka Matsuo (Japan) Mami Naito | 21 | 21
(South Korea) Choi Hye-in (South Korea) Kim So-yeong | 14 | 17

Final
7 | (Hong Kong) Poon Lok Yan (Hong Kong) Tse Ying Suet | 21 | 22
4 | (Japan) Shizuka Matsuo (Japan) Mami Naito | 17 | 20

== Mixed doubles ==
=== Seeds ===
1. (Malaysia) Chan Peng Soon / Goh Liu Ying (champions)
2. (Japan) Shintaro Ikeda / Reiko Shiota (semi-finals)
3. (Japan) Shoji Sato / Shizuka Matsuo (second round)
4. (Thailand) Maneepong Jongjit / Savitree Amitrapai (second round)
5. (Indonesia) Muhammad Rijal / Lilyana Natsir (final)
6. (Thailand) Songphon Anugritayawon / Kunchala Voravichitchaikul (second round)
7. (China) Tao Jiaming / Bao Yixin (withdrew)
8. (Chinese Taipei) Chen Hung-ling / Wu Ti-jung (second round)

=== Top half ===
First Round
(Japan) N Hirata (Japan) M Maeda | 21 | 21
(India) K Tarun (India) A Ponnappa | 18 | 19
6 | (Thailand) S Anugritayawon (Thailand) K Voravichitchaikul | 19 | 21 | 21
(Japan) K Sonoda (Japan) Y Miki | 21 | 12 | 15
(Japan) K Hayakawa (Japan) M Matsutomo | 18 | 21 | 21
(United States) A W Amphie (United States) E Lee | 21 | 14 | 10
(Denmark) A Kristiansen (Denmark) J Houmann
(China) Qiu ZH (China) Tang JH | w | / | d
7 | (China) Tao JM (China) Bao YX | w | / | d
(United States) P Chew (United States) J Subandhi
(Malaysia) Tan A Q (Malaysia) Lai P J | 15 | 21 | 14
(Japan) T Kamura (Japan) K Yonemoto | 21 | 19 | 21

Second Round
1 | (Malaysia) Chan P S (Malaysia) Goh L Y | 21 | 21
(Japan) N Hirata (Japan) M Maeda | 17 | 16
6 | (Thailand) S Anugritayawon (Thailand) K Voravichitchaikul | 14 | 16
(Japan) K Hayakawa (Japan) M Matsutomo | 21 | 21
3 | (Japan) S Sato (Japan) S Matsuo | 18 | 21 | 16
(Denmark) A Kristiansen (Denmark) J Houmann | 21 | 16 | 21
(United States) P Chew (United States) J Subandhi | 12 | 7
(Japan) T Kamura (Japan) K Yonemoto | 21 | 21

Quarterfinals
1 | (Malaysia) Chan P S (Malaysia) Goh L Y | 21 | 28
(Japan) K Hayakawa (Japan) M Matsutomo | 18 | 26
(Denmark) A Kristiansen (Denmark) J Houmann | 20 | 21 | 15
(Japan) T Kamura (Japan) K Yonemoto | 22 | 18 | 21

Semifinals
1 | (Malaysia) Chan P S (Malaysia) Goh L Y | 21 | 21
(Japan) T Kamura (Japan) K Yonemoto | 19 | 13

=== Bottom half ===
First Round
(China) Shen Y (China) Luo Y | w | / | d
(Chinese Taipei) Lu C-b (Chinese Taipei) Shuai P-l
(Japan) R Taohata (Japan) A Takahashi | 13 | 11
5 | (Indonesia) M Rijal (Indonesia) L Natsir | 21 | 21
(Japan) S Hoshino (Japan) K Asumi | 22 | 12
(Malaysia) Tan W K (Malaysia) Ng H L | 24 | 21
(Japan) A Kobayashi (Japan) M Yokoyama | 21 | 13 | 19
4 | (Thailand) M Jongjit (Thailand) S Amitrapai | 18 | 21 | 21
(South Korea) Kang J-w (South Korea) Jang Y-n | 21 | 19 | 21
(Thailand) P Chalardchaleam (Thailand) R Chuthabunditkal | 17 | 21 | 12
(Thailand) N Puangpuapech (Thailand) J Kittiharakul | 12 | 17
8 | (Chinese Taipei) Chen H-l (Chinese Taipei) Wu T-j | 21 | 21
(United States) H L Lee (United States) P Lun | 21 | 18
(South Korea) Kim S-r (South Korea) Kim S-y | 23 | 21
2 | (Japan) S Ikeda (Japan) R Shiota

Second Round
(Chinese Taipei) Lu C-b (Chinese Taipei) Shuai P-l | 12 | 21 | 11
5 | (Indonesia) M Rijal (Indonesia) L Natsir | 21 | 11 | 21
(Malaysia) Tan W K (Malaysia) Ng H L | 21 | 21
4 | (Thailand) M Jongjit (Thailand) S Amitrapai | 12 | 15
(South Korea) Kang J-w (South Korea) Jang Y-n | 22 | 21
8 | (Chinese Taipei) Chen H-l (Chinese Taipei) Wu T-j | 20 | 18
(South Korea) Kim S-r (South Korea) Kim S-y | 14 | 16
2 | (Japan) S Ikeda (Japan) R Shiota | 21 | 21

Quarterfinals
5 | (Indonesia) M Rijal (Indonesia) L Natsir | 21 | 21
(Malaysia) Tan W K (Malaysia) Ng H L | 16 | 18
(South Korea) Kang J-w (South Korea) Jang Y-n | 16 | 15
2 | (Japan) S Ikeda (Japan) R Shiota | 21 | 21

Semifinals
5 | (Indonesia) M Rijal (Indonesia) L Natsir | 21 | 21
2 | (Japan) S Ikeda (Japan) R Shiota | 9 | 11

=== Finals ===
Semifinals
1 | (Malaysia) Chan Peng Soon (Malaysia) Goh Liu Ying | 21 | 21
(Japan) Takeshi Kamura (Japan) Koharu Yonemoto | 19 | 13
5 | (Indonesia) Muhammad Rijal (Indonesia) Lilyana Natsir | 21 | 21
2 | (Japan) Shintaro Ikeda (Japan) Reiko Shiota | 9 | 11

Final
1 | (Malaysia) Chan Peng Soon (Malaysia) Goh Liu Ying | 21 | 21
5 | (Indonesia) Muhammad Rijal (Indonesia) Lilyana Natsir | 12 | 19

| Preceded by 2011 Japan Super Series | Japan Open | Succeeded by 2013 Japan Super Series |
| Preceded by 2012 China Masters Super Series | BWF Super Series; 2012 season | Succeeded by 2012 Denmark Super Series Premier |
