= 2004 Pan American Thomas & Uber Cup Preliminaries =

Tournament details
- Dates: 17–21 February
- Venue: Sir Garfield Sobers Gymnasium
- Location: Bridgetown, Barbados

The 2004 Pan American Thomas & Uber Cup Preliminaries was a continental badminton tournament held to determine the teams qualified for the 2004 Thomas & Uber Cup in Pan America. The event was held in Bridgetown, Barbados from 17 to 21 February 2004.

== Tournament ==
The 2004 Pan American Thomas & Uber Cup Preliminaries, is a continental team tournament staged to determine the teams in Pan America that are qualified for the 2004 Thomas & Uber Cup. This event was organized by Badminton Pan Am and the Barbados Badminton Association. 12 teams, consisting of 7 men's teams and 5 women's teams entered the tournament.

== Men's team ==
=== Group stage ===
==== Group A ====
Pos	Team	Pld	W	L	MF	MA	MD	GF	GA	GD	PF	PA	PD	Pts	Qualification
1	United States	3	3	0	15	0	+15	28	1	+27	433	133	+300	3	Knockout stage
2	Brazil	3	2	1	8	7	+1	17	13	+4	341	324	+17	2	Knockout stage
3	Mexico	3	1	2	6	9	−3	15	20	−5	365	418	−53	1	
4	Trinidad and Tobago	3	0	3	1	14	−13	3	29	−26	206	470	−264	0	

Source: TournamentSoftware
- Brazil vs Mexico

Brazil
3
Sir Garfield Sobers Gymnasium
17 February 2004, 18:00 UTC−4

Mexico
2

			1	2	3
1	(Brazil) (Mexico)	Guilherme Pardo; José González	15; 4	15; 6
2	(Brazil) (Mexico)	Guilherme Kumasaka; Jesús Aguilar	15; 8	8; 15	11; 15
3	(Brazil) (Mexico)	Ricardo Trevelin; Bernardo Monreal	10; 15	4; 15
4	(Brazil) (Mexico)	Guilherme Kumasaka / Guilherme Pardo; Jesús Aguilar / Daniel Orozco	15; 12	15; 4
5	(Brazil) (Mexico)	Lucas Araújo / Ricardo Trevelin; Bernardo Monreal / Luis Suárez	15; 8	16; 17	17; 15

- United States vs Trinidad & Tobago

United States
5
Sir Garfield Sobers Gymnasium
18 February 2004, 10:00 UTC−4

Trinidad and Tobago
0

			1	2	3
1	(United States) (Trinidad and Tobago)	Eric Go; Anil Seepaul	15; 1	15; 6
2	(United States) (Trinidad and Tobago)	Khan Malaythong; Kerwyn Pantin	15; 7	15; 5
3	(United States) (Trinidad and Tobago)	Kevin Han; Rahul Rampersad	15; 2	15; 2
4	(United States) (Trinidad and Tobago)	Tony Gunawan / Kevin Han; Kerwyn Pantin / Anil Seepaul	15; 4	15; 2
5	(United States) (Trinidad and Tobago)	Howard Bach / Khan Malaythong; Saragudeen Mohammed / Rahul Rampersad	15; 4	15; 4

- Brazil vs Trinidad & Tobago

Brazil
5
Sir Garfield Sobers Gymnasium
18 February 2004, 18:00 UTC−4

Trinidad and Tobago
0

			1	2	3
1	(Brazil) (Trinidad and Tobago)	Guilherme Pardo; Anil Seepaul	15; 6	15; 9
2	(Brazil) (Trinidad and Tobago)	Ricardo Trevelin; Saragudeen Mohammed	15; 2	15; 6
3	(Brazil) (Trinidad and Tobago)	Lucas Araújo; Kerwyn Pantin	15; 12	17; 15
4	(Brazil) (Trinidad and Tobago)	Guilherme Kumasaka / Guilherme Pardo; Rahul Rampersad / Justin Siu	15; 1	15; 1
5	(Brazil) (Trinidad and Tobago)	Lucas Araújo / Ricardo Trevelin; Kerwyn Pantin / Anil Seepaul	15; 6	15; 12

- United States vs Mexico

United States
5
Sir Garfield Sobers Gymnasium
19 February 2004, 10:00 UTC−4

Mexico
0

			1	2	3
1	(United States) (Mexico)	Eric Go; Daniel Orozco	15; 4	15; 6
2	(United States) (Mexico)	Tony Gunawan; Adrián de la Vega	15; 1	15; 4
3	(United States) (Mexico)	Khan Malaythong; Luis Suárez	15; 6	15; 8
4	(United States) (Mexico)	Matthew Fogarty / Dean Schoppe; Jesús Aguilar / José González	15; 8	13; 15	15; 7
5	(United States) (Mexico)	Howard Bach / Kevin Han; Adrián de la Vega / Luis Suárez	15; 2	15; 2

- Trinidad & Tobago vs Mexico

Trinidad and Tobago
1
Sir Garfield Sobers Gymnasium
19 February 2004, 18:00 UTC−4

Mexico
4

			1	2	3
1	(Trinidad and Tobago) (Mexico)	Anil Seepaul; Daniel Orozco	1; 15	15; 7	17; 14
2	(Trinidad and Tobago) (Mexico)	Kerwyn Pantin; Jesús Aguilar	6; 15	7; 15
3	(Trinidad and Tobago) (Mexico)	Rahul Rampersad; Bernardo Monreal	2; 15	2; 15
4	(Trinidad and Tobago) (Mexico)	Kerwyn Pantin / Anil Seepaul; Jesús Aguilar / Daniel Orozco	15; 12	11; 15	12; 15
5	(Trinidad and Tobago) (Mexico)	Rahul Rampersad / Justin Siu; Bernardo Monreal / Luis Suárez	2; 15	9; 15

- Brazil vs United States

Brazil
0
Sir Garfield Sobers Gymnasium
19 February 2004, 18:00 UTC−4

United States
5

			1	2	3
1	(Brazil) (United States)	Guilherme Pardo; Eric Go	5; 15	1; 15
2	(Brazil) (United States)	Guilherme Kumasaka; Howard Bach	3; 15	4; 15
3	(Brazil) (United States)	Lucas Araújo; Khan Malaythong	4; 15	8; 15
4	(Brazil) (United States)	Guilherme Kumasaka / Guilherme Pardo; Howard Bach / Tony Gunawan				w/o
5	(Brazil) (United States)	Lucas Araújo / Ricardo Trevelin; Kevin Han / Khan Malaythong	3; 15	5; 15

==== Group B ====
Pos	Team	Pld	W	L	MF	MA	MD	GF	GA	GD	PF	PA	PD	Pts	Qualification
1	Canada	2	2	0	9	1	+8	18	2	+16	274	103	+171	2	Knockout stage
2	Guatemala	2	1	1	6	4	+2	12	8	+4	232	193	+39	1	Knockout stage
3	Barbados	2	0	2	0	10	−10	0	20	−20	94	304	−210	0	

Source: TournamentSoftware
- Canada vs Barbados

Canada
5
Sir Garfield Sobers Gymnasium
17 February 2004, 18:00 UTC−4

Barbados
0

			1	2	3
1	(Canada) (Barbados)	Bobby Milroy; Andre Padmore	15; 4	15; 4
2	(Canada) (Barbados)	Mike Beres; Curwin Cherubin	15; 3	15; 2
3	(Canada) (Barbados)	Stephan Wojcikiewicz; Ryan Holder	15; 3	15; 6
4	(Canada) (Barbados)	Mike Beres / Kyle Hunter; Andre Padmore / Kevin Wood	15; 0	15; 0
5	(Canada) (Barbados)	Keith Chan / William Milroy; Curwin Cherubin / Andrew Clarke	15; 0	15; 3

- Guatemala vs Barbados

Guatemala
5
Sir Garfield Sobers Gymnasium
18 February 2004, 18:00 UTC−4

Barbados
0

			1	2	3
1	(Guatemala) (Barbados)	Pedro Yang; Andre Padmore	15; 1	17; 14
2	(Guatemala) (Barbados)	Erick Anguiano; Ryan Holder	15; 2	15; 1
3	(Guatemala) (Barbados)	Kevin Cordón; Dave Forde	15; 3	15; 9
4	(Guatemala) (Barbados)	Erick Anguiano / Pedro Yang; Andre Padmore / Kevin Wood	15; 7	15; 8
5	(Guatemala) (Barbados)	Kevin Cordón / Rodolfo Ramírez; Curwin Cherubin / Andrew Clarke	15; 8	17; 16

- Canada vs Guatemala

Canada
4
Sir Garfield Sobers Gymnasium
19 February 2004, 18:00 UTC−4

Guatemala
1

			1	2	3
1	(Canada) (Guatemala)	Bobby Milroy; Pedro Yang	15; 6	15; 11
2	(Canada) (Guatemala)	Andrew Dabeka; Erick Anguiano	3; 15	1; 15
3	(Canada) (Guatemala)	Stephan Wojcikiewicz; Kevin Cordón	15; 7	15; 8
4	(Canada) (Guatemala)	Mike Beres / Kyle Hunter; Erick Anguiano / Pedro Yang	15; 3	15; 8
5	(Canada) (Guatemala)	Keith Chan / William Milroy; Kevin Cordón / Rodolfo Ramírez	15; 1	15; 4

=== Knockout stage ===
==== Bracket ====
Semi-finals
17 February
United States	3
Guatemala	1
17 February
Brazil	0
Canada	3

Final
18 February
United States	3
Canada	1
Third place
18 February
Guatemala	3
Brazil	0

==== Semi-finals ====
- United States vs Guatemala

United States
3
Sir Garfield Sobers Gymnasium
20 February 2004, 18:00 UTC−4

Guatemala
1

			1	2	3
1	(United States) (Guatemala)	Eric Go; Pedro Yang	10; 15	9; 15
2	(United States) (Guatemala)	Kevin Han; Kevin Cordón	15; 0	15; 3
3	(United States) (Guatemala)	Howard Bach; Erick Anguiano	15; 5	13; 15	15; 13
4	(United States) (Guatemala)	Tony Gunawan / Khan Malaythong; Kevin Cordón / Rodolfo Ramírez	15; 2	15; 4
5	(United States) (Guatemala)	Howard Bach / Kevin Han; Erick Anguiano / Pedro Yang				not played

- Brazil vs Canada

Brazil
0
Sir Garfield Sobers Gymnasium
20 February 2004, 18:00 UTC−4

Canada
3

			1	2	3
1	(Brazil) (Canada)	Guilherme Pardo; Stephan Wojcikiewicz	8; 15	11; 15
2	(Brazil) (Canada)	Ricardo Trevelin; Kyle Hunter	0; 15	4; 15
3	(Brazil) (Canada)	Lucas Araújo; Mike Beres	3; 15	0; 15
4	(Brazil) (Canada)	Guilherme Kumasaka / Guilherme Pardo; Keith Chan / William Milroy				not played
5	(Brazil) (Canada)	Lucas Araújo / Ricardo Trevelin; Kyle Hunter / Bobby Milroy				not played

==== Third place ====
- Guatemala vs Brazil

Guatemala
3
Sir Garfield Sobers Gymnasium
21 February 2004, 10:00 UTC−4

Brazil
0

			1	2	3
1	(Guatemala) (Brazil)	Pedro Yang; Guilherme Pardo	15; 6	15; 7
2	(Guatemala) (Brazil)	Erick Anguiano; Guilherme Kumasaka	15; 13	15; 2
3	(Guatemala) (Brazil)	Kevin Cordón; Ricardo Trevelin	4; 15	15; 10	15; 10
4	(Guatemala) (Brazil)	Pedro Yang / Erick Anguiano; Guilherme Kumasaka / Guilherme Pardo				not played
5	(Guatemala) (Brazil)	Kevin Cordón / Rodolfo Ramírez; Lucas Araújo / Ricardo Trevelin				not played

=== Final ===
- United States vs Canada

United States
3
Sir Garfield Sobers Gymnasium
21 February 2004, 18:00 UTC−4

Canada
1

			1	2	3
1	(United States) (Canada)	Howard Bach; Bobby Milroy	15; 12	12; 15	4; 15
2	(United States) (Canada)	Kevin Han; Stephan Wojcikiewicz	15; 3	15; 13
3	(United States) (Canada)	Tony Gunawan; Mike Beres	17; 15	15; 11
4	(United States) (Canada)	Howard Bach / Khan Malaythong; Kyle Hunter / Bobby Milroy	15; 2	15; 9
5	(United States) (Canada)	Tony Gunawan / Kevin Han; Keith Chan / William Milroy				not played

== Women's team ==
=== Round-robin ===
==== Standings ====
Pos	Team	Pld	W	L	MF	MA	MD	GF	GA	GD	PF	PA	PD	Pts	Qualification
1	Canada	4	4	0	20	0	+20	40	1	+39	514	154	+360	4	2004 Uber Cup
2	United States	4	3	1	13	7	+6	27	16	+11	431	294	+137	3	
3	Peru	4	2	2	12	8	+4	26	16	+10	399	302	+97	2	
4	Guatemala	4	1	3	4	16	−12	6	33	−27	152	452	−300	1	
5	Barbados	4	0	4	1	19	−18	3	36	−33	175	469	−294	0	

Source: TournamentSoftware
- Canada vs. Guatemala

Canada
5
Sir Garfield Sobers Gymnasium
17 February 2004, 18:00 UTC+1

Guatemala
0

			1	2	3
1	(Canada) (Guatemala)	Charmaine Reid; Anelissa Micheo	11; 1	11; 0
2	(Canada) (Guatemala)	Denyse Julien; Marlin Maldonado	11; 3	11; 5
3	(Canada) (Guatemala)	Jody Patrick; Antonieta Castro	11; 1	11; 1
4	(Canada) (Guatemala)	Helen Nichol / Charmaine Reid; Marlin Maldonado / Anelissa Micheo	15; 5	15; 0
5	(Canada) (Guatemala)	Denyse Julien / Jody Patrick; Antonieta Castro / Paola Mejía	15; 7	15; 0

- Peru vs Barbados

Peru
5
Sir Garfield Sobers Gymnasium
17 February 2004, 18:00 UTC+1

Barbados
0

			1	2	3
1	(Peru) (Barbados)	Lorena Blanco; Dionne Forde	11; 0	11; 1
2	(Peru) (Barbados)	Sandra Jimeno; Mariama Eastmond	11; 0	11; 1
3	(Peru) (Barbados)	Claudia Rivero; Shari Watson	11; 1	11; 0
4	(Peru) (Barbados)	Sandra Jimeno / Doriana Rivera; Mariama Eastmond / Dionne Forde	15; 8	15; 9
5	(Peru) (Barbados)	Lorena Blanco / Valeria Rivero; Shakeira Waithe / Shari Watson	15; 8	15; 3

- United States vs Barbados

United States
5
Sir Garfield Sobers Gymnasium
18 February 2004, 10:00 UTC+1

Barbados
0

			1	2	3
1	(United States) (Barbados)	Mesinee Mangkalakiri; Dionne Forde	11; 2	11; 1
2	(United States) (Barbados)	Eva Lee; Mariama Eastmond	11; 2	11; 1
3	(United States) (Barbados)	Jamie Subandhi; Shari Watson	11; 6	11; 7
4	(United States) (Barbados)	Eva Lee / Mesinee Mangkalakiri; Mariama Eastmond / Dionne Forde	15; 3	15; 2
5	(United States) (Barbados)	Rulan Yeh / Rulien Yeh; Shakeira Waithe / Shari Watson	15; 10	15; 11

- Peru vs Guatemala

Peru
5
Sir Garfield Sobers Gymnasium
18 February 2004, 10:00 UTC+1

Guatemala
0

			1	2	3
1	(Peru) (Guatemala)	Lorena Blanco; Anelissa Micheo	11; 0	11; 3
2	(Peru) (Guatemala)	Sandra Jimeno; Marlin Maldonado	11; 0	11; 3
3	(Peru) (Guatemala)	Claudia Rivero; Paola Mejía	11; 4	11; 2
4	(Peru) (Guatemala)	Sandra Jimeno / Doriana Rivera; Anelissa Micheo / Marlin Maldonado	15; 2	15; 3
5	(Peru) (Guatemala)	Lorena Blanco / Valeria Rivero; Antonieta Castro / Paola Mejía	15; 5	15; 2

- United States vs Guatemala

United States
5
Sir Garfield Sobers Gymnasium
18 February 2004, 18:00 UTC+1

Guatemala
0

			1	2	3
1	(United States) (Guatemala)	Mesinee Mangkalakiri; Anelissa Micheo	11; 3	11; 6
2	(United States) (Guatemala)	Eva Lee; Marlin Maldonado	11; 0	11; 0
3	(United States) (Guatemala)	Jamie Subandhi; Antonieta Castro				w/o
4	(United States) (Guatemala)	Eva Lee / Mesinee Mangkalakiri; Marlin Maldonado / Anelissa Micheo	15; 1	15; 2
5	(United States) (Guatemala)	Rulan Yeh / Rulien Yeh; Antonieta Castro / Paola Mejía				w/o

- Canada vs Barbados

Canada
5
Sir Garfield Sobers Gymnasium
18 February 2004, 18:00 UTC+1

Barbados
0

			1	2	3
1	(Canada) (Barbados)	Anna Rice; Mariama Eastmond	11; 2	11; 0
2	(Canada) (Barbados)	Denyse Julien; Shari Watson	11; 4	11; 3
3	(Canada) (Barbados)	Jody Patrick; Shakeira Waithe	11; 2	11; 1
4	(Canada) (Barbados)	Helen Nichol / Charmaine Reid; Mariama Eastmond / Dionne Forde	15; 5	15; 3
5	(Canada) (Barbados)	Denyse Julien / Jody Patrick; Shari Watson / Shakeira Waithe	15; 1	15; 4

- Guatemala vs Barbados

Guatemala
4
Sir Garfield Sobers Gymnasium
19 February 2004, 10:00 UTC+1

Barbados
1

			1	2	3
1	(Guatemala) (Barbados)	Anelissa Micheo; Mariama Eastmond	11; 2	11; 7
2	(Guatemala) (Barbados)	Marlin Maldonado; Shari Watson	11; 1	11; 8
3	(Guatemala) (Barbados)	Paola Mejía; Shakeira Waithe	13; 11	9; 11	11; 4
4	(Guatemala) (Barbados)	Anelissa Micheo / Marlin Maldonado; Mariama Eastmond / Dionne Forde	3; 15	11; 15
5	(Guatemala) (Barbados)	Antonieta Castro / Paola Mejía; Shari Watson / Shakeira Waithe				w/o

- Canada vs United States

Canada
5
Sir Garfield Sobers Gymnasium
19 February 2004, 10:00 UTC+1

United States
0

			1	2	3
1	(Canada) (United States)	Charmaine Reid; Mesinee Mangkalakiri	11; 3	11; 4
2	(Canada) (United States)	Denyse Julien; Eva Lee	11; 5	11; 3
3	(Canada) (United States)	Jody Patrick; Jamie Subandhi	11; 1	11; 1
4	(Canada) (United States)	Helen Nichol / Charmaine Reid; Eva Lee / Mesinee Mangkalakiri	10; 15	15; 4	15; 5
5	(Canada) (United States)	Denyse Julien / Anna Rice; Rulan Yeh / Rulien Yeh	15; 4	15; 13

- Peru vs United States

Peru
2
Sir Garfield Sobers Gymnasium
20 February 2004, 18:00 UTC+1

United States
3

			1	2	3
1	(Peru) (United States)	Lorena Blanco; Mesinee Mangkalakiri	11; 4	13; 11
2	(Peru) (United States)	Sandra Jimeno; Eva Lee	11; 4	4; 11	2; 11
3	(Peru) (United States)	Claudia Rivero; Jamie Subandhi	11; 3	11; 4
4	(Peru) (United States)	Lorena Blanco / Sandra Jimeno; Eva Lee / Mesinee Mangkalakiri	5; 15	2; 15
5	(Peru) (United States)	Doriana Rivera / Valeria Rivero; Rulan Yeh / Rulien Yeh	4; 15	15; 13	10; 15

- Canada vs Peru

Canada
5
Sir Garfield Sobers Gymnasium
21 February 2004, 18:00 UTC+1

Peru
0

			1	2	3
1	(Canada) (Peru)	Charmaine Reid; Lorena Blanco	11; 3	11; 5
2	(Canada) (Peru)	Anna Rice; Valeria Rivero	11; 2	11; 1
3	(Canada) (Peru)	Jody Patrick; Claudia Rivero	11; 5	11; 6
4	(Canada) (Peru)	Helen Nichol / Charmaine Reid; Doriana Rivera / Sandra Jimeno	15; 8	15; 6
5	(Canada) (Peru)	Denyse Julien / Anna Rice; Claudia Rivero / Valeria Rivero	15; 7	15; 5
