= 2012 U.S. Open Grand Prix Gold =

Tournament details
- Dates: July 2, 2012 - July 7, 2012
- Total prize money: US$120,000
- Venue: Orange County Badminton Club
- Location: Orange, United States

The 2012 U.S. Open Grand Prix Gold was the seventh grand prix gold and grand prix tournament of the 2012 BWF Grand Prix Gold and Grand Prix. The tournament was held in Orange County Badminton Club, Orange, United States July 2 until July 7, 2012 and had a total purse of $120,000.

== Men's singles ==
=== Seeds ===
1. (Japan) Takuma Ueda (final)
2. (Sweden) Henri Hurskainen (second round)
3. (Russia) Vladimir Ivanov (champion)
4. (Malaysia) Tan Chun Seang (semi-final)
5. (Sri Lanka) Niluka Karunaratne (quarter-final)
6. (Chinese Taipei) Chou Tien-chen (quarter-final)
7. (Austria) Michael Lahnsteiner (third round)
8. (India) Chetan Anand (third round)
9. (Israel) Misha Zilberman (first round)
10. (Denmark) Christian Lind Thomsen (first round)
11. (Russia) Ivan Sozonov (third round)
12. (India) Arvind Bhat (first round)
13. (Denmark) Joachim Persson (third round)
14. (United States) Sattawat Pongnairat (first round)
15. (Austria) Luka Wraber (first round)
16. (Uganda) Edwin Ekiring (quarter-final)

=== Finals ===
Quarterfinals
1	(Japan) Takuma Ueda	21	21
16	(Uganda) Edwin Ekiring	12	13
4	(Malaysia) Tan Chun Seang	21	21
6	(Chinese Taipei) Chou Tien-chen	12	14
5	(Sri Lanka) Niluka Karunaratne	12	14
3	(Russia) Vladimir Ivanov	21	21
(Malaysia) Lim Fang Yang	21	19	14
(Japan) Riichi Takeshita	16	21	21

Semifinals
1	(Japan) Takuma Ueda	21	21
4	(Malaysia) Tan Chun Seang	16	12
3	(Russia) Vladimir Ivanov	21	21
(Japan) Riichi Takeshita	16	11

Final
1	(Japan) Takuma Ueda	20	17
3	(Russia) Vladimir Ivanov	22	21

=== Top half ===
==== Section 1 ====
First Round
1	(Japan) T Ueda	21	21
(Philippines) A Gadi	14	6
(Mexico) A Lopez	17	14
(United States) S Phanpuchara	21	21
15	(Austria) L Wraber	17	20
(United States) A Amphie	21	22
(Scotland) A Casey	19	21	19
(Austria) R Gnedt	21	10	21

Second Round
1	(Japan) T Ueda	21	21
(United States) S Phanpuchara	5	7
(United States) A Amphie	21	21
(Austria) R Gnedt	13	11

Third Round
1	(Japan) T Ueda	21	21
(United States) A Amphie	10	6

==== Section 2 ====
First Round
8	(India) C Anand	21	21
(Brazil) L Pinto	12	11
(Canada) J Rogers	21	23
(United States) T Pojanakanokporn	10	21
16	(Uganda) E Ekiring	2
(United States) A Setiadi	1^{r}
Q1	(United States) M Lin	16	21	21
Q7	(United States) N Waller	21	12	13

Second Round
8	(India) C Anand	21	21
(Canada) J Rogers	14	11
16	(Uganda) E Ekiring	21	21
Q1	(United States) M Lin	13	13

Third Round
8	(India) C Anand	18	13
16	(Uganda) E Ekiring	21	21

==== Section 3 ====
First Round
4	(Malaysia) Tan CS	21	20	21
(United States) Lee HL	10	22	13
(Mexico) A Quadri	19	15
(Canada) S Shatenko	21	21
11	(Russia) I Sozonov	11	21	21
(United States) H Shu	21	18	17
(Venezuela) K Matute	wo
(Norway) C Hem

Second Round
4	(Malaysia) Tan CS	23	21
(Canada) S Shatenko	21	18
11	(Russia) I Sozonov	21	21
(Norway) C Hem	11	10

Third Round
4	(Malaysia) Tan CS	21	21
11	(Russia) I Sozonov	7	15

==== Section 4 ====
First Round
6	(Chinese Taipei) Chou T-c	21	21
(United States) Y Chern	7	10
(United States) N Jinadasa	22	18	21
Q6	(United States) C Lin	20	21	12
13	(Denmark) J Persson	21	21
(United States) Chan YH	14	12
(Canada) A D'Souza	21	21
(Austria) D Obernosterer	18	16

Second Round
6	(Chinese Taipei) Chou T-c	21	21
(United States) N Jinadasa	17	6
13	(Denmark) J Persson	21	21
(Canada) A D'Souza	12	16

Third Round
6	(Chinese Taipei) Chou T-c	15	21	21
13	(Denmark) J Persson	21	13	15

=== Bottom half ===
==== Section 5 ====
First Round
(Norway) J Hagen	8	9
Q3	(United States) E Go	21	21
(Japan) S Wada	10	25	21
12	(India) A Bhat	21	23	18
Q2	(United States) S Phanpuchara	21	21
(Brazil) R Salles	12	11
Q8	(United States) R Chew	11	14
5	(Sri Lanka) N Karunaratne	21	21

Second Round
Q3	(United States) E Go	20	12
(Japan) S Wada	22	21
Q2	(United States) S Phanpuchara	14	21	14
5	(Sri Lanka) N Karunaratne	21	17	21

Third Round
(Japan) S Wada	19	21	16
5	(Sri Lanka) N Karunaratne	21	14	21

==== Section 6 ====
First Round
(India) A Mahajan	21	21
Q4	(United States) C Stensland	15	14
(Chinese Taipei) Lin Y-h	21	21
14	(United States) S Pongnairat	16	11
(Canada) N Yakura
PFQ	(United States) D Lim	wo
(Jamaica) G Henry	wo
3	(Russia) V Ivanov

Second Round
(India) A Mahajan	10	10
(Chinese Taipei) Lin Y-h	21	21
(Canada) N Yakura	14	11
3	(Russia) V Ivanov	21	21

Third Round
(Chinese Taipei) Lin Y-h	19	14
3	(Russia) V Ivanov	21	21

==== Section 7 ====
First Round
(Mexico) L Munoz	21	21
(Trinidad and Tobago) N Bonkowsky	5	8
(Malaysia) Lim FY	16	21	21
9	(Israel) M Zilberman	21	13	15
(Norway) M Myhre
(Venezuela) L Camacho	wo
Q5	(United States) J Lee	6	4
7	(Austria) M Lahnsteiner	21	21

Second Round
(Mexico) L Munoz	15	15
(Malaysia) Lim FY	21	21
(Norway) M Myhre	17	2^{r}
7	(Austria) M Lahnsteiner	21	11

Third Round
(Malaysia) Lim FY	21	21
7	(Austria) M Lahnsteiner	19	19

==== Section 8 ====
First Round
(United States) G.J. Watts	21	20	21
(Canada) M Chan	15	22	13
(Chinese Taipei) Wan C-h	14	25	21
10	(Denmark) C Thomsen	21	23	17
(Norway) J Christensen	5	5
(Japan) R Takeshita	21	21
(Brazil) L Martinez	3	10
2	(Sweden) H Hurskainen	21	21

Second Round
(United States) G.J. Watts	8	13
(Chinese Taipei) Wan C-h	21	21
(Japan) R Takeshita	21	21
2	(Sweden) H Hurskainen	15	17

Third Round
(Chinese Taipei) Wan C-h	9	21	17
(Japan) R Takeshita	21	11	21

== Women's singles ==
=== Seeds ===
1. (Chinese Taipei) Pai Hsiao-ma (champion)
2. (Turkey) Neslihan Yigit (withdrew)
3. (New Zealand) Michelle Chan Ky (first round)
4. (Russia) Anastasia Prokopenko (quarter-final)

=== Finals ===
Semifinals
1	(Chinese Taipei) Pai Hsiao-ma	21	21
(Singapore) Zhang Beiwen	16	16
(Japan) Kaori Imabeppu	21	21
(Canada) Joycelyn Ko	8	12

Final
1	(Chinese Taipei) Pai Hsiao-ma	21	16	21
(Japan) Kaori Imabeppu	17	21	11

=== Top half ===
==== Section 1 ====
First Round
1	(Chinese Taipei) Pai H-m
BYE
(Canada) C Tsai	21	18	21
(United States) J Subandhi	11	21	15
(Brazil) T Cruz	8	8
(Canada) P Chan	21	21
(India) S Jasti	12	21	21
(United States) C Yang	21	16	8

Second Round
1	(Chinese Taipei) Pai H-m	21	25	21
(Canada) C Tsai	16	27	7
(Canada) P Chan	27	21
(India) S Jasti	25	12

Quarterfinals
1	(Chinese Taipei) Pai H-m	21	21
(Canada) P Chan	11	8

==== Section 2 ====
First Round
4	(Russia) A Prokopenko	21	21
(Canada) C Reid	8	13
(Turkey) O Bayrak	wo
(Austria) S Prutsch
(Norway) M Waland	11	8
(United States) I Wang	21	21
(Japan) Y Kusunose	15	18
(Singapore) Zhang BW	21	21

Second Round
4	(Russia) A Prokopenko	21	21
(Austria) S Prutsch	17	8
(United States) I Wang	17	14
(Singapore) Zhang BW	21	21

Quarterfinals
4	(Russia) A Prokopenko	8	9
(Singapore) Zhang BW	21	21

=== Bottom half ===
==== Section 3 ====
First Round
(United States) P Lun	11	8
(Canada) N Grether	21	21
(Mexico) N Gonzalez	12	16
(Chinese Taipei) Chang H-y	21	21
(Germany) K Schnaase	10	15
(Japan) K Imabeppu	21	21
(Chinese Taipei) Hung S-h	21	22
3	(New Zealand) M Chan Ky	17	20

Second Round
(Canada) N Grether	21	17	21
(Chinese Taipei) Chang H-y	16	21	11
(Japan) K Imabeppu	21	21
(Chinese Taipei) Hung S-h	12	19

Quarterfinals
(Canada) N Grether	14	4
(Japan) K Imabeppu	21	21

==== Section 4 ====
First Round
(Norway) A Klyve	3	5
(United States) R Wang	21	21
(Chinese Taipei) Chang Y-l	10	16
(United States) Rong B	21	21
(Canada) J Ko	21	21
(United States) Chen K-y	15	14
(United States) V Phongasavithas
2	(Turkey) N Yigit	wo

Second Round
(United States) R Wang	4	9
(United States) Rong B	21	21
(Canada) J Ko	21	21
(United States) V Phongasavithas	19	8

Quarterfinals
(United States) Rong B	16	19
(Canada) J Ko	21	21

== Men's doubles ==
=== Seeds ===
1. (Japan) Hiroyuki Endo / Kenichi Hayakawa (champion)
2. (Russia) Vladimir Ivanov / Ivan Sozonov (quarter-final)
3. (United States) Tony Gunawan / Howard Bach (semi-final)
4. (Japan) Yoshiteru Hirobe / Kenta Kazuno (final)

=== Finals ===
Semifinals
1	(Japan) Hiroyuki Endo (Japan) Kenichi Hayakawa	21	21
3	(United States) Tony Gunawan (United States) Howard Bach	19	14
4	(Japan) Yoshiteru Hirobe (Japan) Kenta Kazuno	21	21
(Austria) Jurgen Koch (Austria) Peter Zauner	17	11

Final
1	(Japan) Hiroyuki Endo (Japan) Kenichi Hayakawa	21	21
4	(Japan) Yoshiteru Hirobe (Japan) Kenta Kazuno	15	10

=== Top half ===
==== Section 1 ====
First Round
1	(Japan) H Endo (Japan) K Hayakawa
BYE
(United States) A Cheng (United States) A Chong	11	15
(Austria) R Zirnwald (Austria) D Obernosterer	21	21
(Brazil) L Martinez (Brazil) R Salles	21	14
(United States) J Lee (United States) D Lim	23	21
(United States) K Hui (United States) S Wibowo	14	10
(Norway) J Christensen (Norway) M Myhre	21	21

Second Round
1	(Japan) H Endo (Japan) K Hayakawa	21	21
(Austria) R Zirnwald (Austria) D Obernosterer	13	18
(United States) J Lee (United States) D Lim	17	13
(Norway) J Christensen (Norway) M Myhre	21	21

Quarterfinals
1	(Japan) H Endo (Japan) K Hayakawa	21	21
(Norway) J Christensen (Norway) M Myhre	7	7

==== Section 2 ====
First Round
3	(United States) T Gunawan (United States) H Bach
BYE
(Mexico) A Lopez (Mexico) L Munoz
(Venezuela) L Camacho (Venezuela) K Matute	wo
(United States) R Chew (United States) R Gunawan	7	8
(Chinese Taipei) Chen C-j (Chinese Taipei) Lu C-b	21	21
(Canada) A Liu (Canada) N Yakura	21	21
(United States) P Song (United States) G.J. Watts	13	15

Second Round
3	(United States) T Gunawan (United States) H Bach	21	21
(Mexico) A Lopez (Mexico) L Munoz	19	12
(Chinese Taipei) Chen C-j (Chinese Taipei) Lu C-b	21	21
(Canada) A Liu (Canada) N Yakura	14	14

Quarterfinals
3	(United States) T Gunawan (United States) H Bach	21	21
(Chinese Taipei) Chen C-j (Chinese Taipei) Lu C-b	17	7

=== Bottom half ===
==== Section 3 ====
First Round
(Philippines) K Asuncion (Philippines) A Gadi	21	20	21
(United States) P Chew (United States) S Pongnairat	11	22	8
(United States) Chan YH (United States) K Emerick	13	18
(Chinese Taipei) Lin Y-h (Chinese Taipei) Wan C-h	21	21
(United States) K Bohr (United States) Y Chern	7	16
(Canada) A D'Souza (Canada) S Shatenko	21	21
(United States) S Phanpuchara (United States) S Phanpuchara	12	12
4	(Japan) Y Hirobe (Japan) K Kazuno	21	21

Second Round
(Philippines) K Asuncion (Philippines) A Gadi	21	21
(Chinese Taipei) Lin Y-h (Chinese Taipei) Wan C-h	16	19
(Canada) A D'Souza (Canada) S Shatenko	6	8
4	(Japan) Y Hirobe (Japan) K Kazuno	21	21

Quarterfinals
(Philippines) K Asuncion (Philippines) A Gadi	14	7
4	(Japan) Y Hirobe (Japan) K Kazuno	21	21

==== Section 4 ====
First Round
(United States) C Lin (United States) M Lin	21	21
(Norway) J Hagen (Norway) C Hem	17	9
(Austria) J Koch (Austria) P Zauner
(Brazil) L Pinto (Brazil) F Farias	wo
(Mexico) A Quadri (Mexico) L Suarez	11^{r}
(United States) Lo CL (United States) J Shee	17
BYE
2	(Russia) V Ivanov (Russia) I Sozonov

Second Round
(United States) C Lin (United States) M Lin	25	11
(Austria) J Koch (Austria) P Zauner	27	21
(United States) Lo CL (United States) J Shee	0	5
2	(Russia) V Ivanov (Russia) I Sozonov	21	21

Quarterfinals
(Austria) J Koch (Austria) P Zauner	16	21	21
2	(Russia) V Ivanov (Russia) I Sozonov	21	14	19

== Women's doubles ==
=== Seeds ===
1. (Japan) Misaki Matsutomo / Ayaka Takahashi (champion)
2. (Russia) Valeria Sorokina / Nina Vislova (final)
3. (United States) Eva Lee / Paula Lynn Obanana (quarter-final)
4. (Canada) Nicole Grether / Charmaine Reid (second round)

=== Finals ===
Semifinals
1	(Japan) Misaki Matsutomo (Japan) Ayaka Takahashi	21	21
(Sweden) Emma Wengberg (Sweden) Emelie Lennartsson	15	13
(Indonesia) Vita Marissa (Indonesia) Mona Santoso	15	19
2	(Russia) Valeria Sorokina (Russia) Nina Vislova	21	21

Final
1	(Japan) Misaki Matsutomo (Japan) Ayaka Takahashi	21	21
2	(Russia) Valeria Sorokina (Russia) Nina Vislova	19	17

=== Top half ===
==== Section 1 ====
First Round
1	(Japan) M Matsutomo (Japan) A Takahashi
BYE
(United States) P Phongasavithas (United States) V Phongasavithas
BYE
(Chinese Taipei) Chang H-y (Chinese Taipei) Hung S-c
BYE
(Indonesia) K Dewi (Indonesia) J Gozali
BYE

Second Round
1	(Japan) M Matsutomo (Japan) A Takahashi	21	21
(United States) P Phongasavithas (United States) V Phongasavithas	5	11
(Chinese Taipei) Chang H-y (Chinese Taipei) Hung S-c	8	20
(Indonesia) K Dewi (Indonesia) J Gozali	21	22

Quarterfinals
1	(Japan) M Matsutomo (Japan) A Takahashi	21	21
(Indonesia) K Dewi (Indonesia) J Gozali	14	8

==== Section 2 ====
First Round
3	(United States) E Lee (United States) P Obanana
BYE
(Canada) G Gao (Canada) J Ko
BYE
(Norway) A Klyve (Norway) M Waland
BYE
(Sweden) E Wengberg (Sweden) E Lennartsson	21	21
(United States) C Chow (United States) C Yang	15	15

Second Round
3	(United States) E Lee (United States) P Obanana	21	21
(Canada) G Gao (Canada) J Ko	18	15
(Norway) A Klyve (Norway) M Waland	10	11
(Sweden) E Wengberg (Sweden) E Lennartsson	21	21

Quarterfinals
3	(United States) E Lee (United States) P Obanana	16	21	14
(Sweden) E Wengberg (Sweden) E Lennartsson	21	10	21

=== Bottom half ===
==== Section 3 ====
First Round
(Indonesia) V Marissa (Indonesia) M Santoso	21	21
(United States) R Yeh (United States) R Yeh	10	12
BYE
(Malaysia) Lim YT (United States) Rong B
BYE
(Canada) P Chan (Canada) C Tsai
BYE
4	(Canada) N Grether (Canada) C Reid

Second Round
(Indonesia) V Marissa (Indonesia) M Santoso
(Malaysia) Lim YT (United States) Rong B	wo
(Canada) P Chan (Canada) C Tsai	21	21
4	(Canada) N Grether (Canada) C Reid	13	15

Quarterfinals
(Indonesia) V Marissa (Indonesia) M Santoso	21	21
(Canada) P Chan (Canada) C Tsai	15	16

==== Section 4 ====
First Round
(Turkey) N Yigit (Turkey) O Bayrak	wo
(United States) Chen K-y (United States) J Subandhi
BYE
(United States) I Wang (United States) R Wang
BYE
(Chinese Taipei) Chiang K-h (Chinese Taipei) Tsai P-l
BYE
2	(Russia) V Sorokina (Russia) N Vislova

Second Round
(United States) Chen K-y (United States) J Subandhi	13	13
(United States) I Wang (United States) R Wang	21	21
(Chinese Taipei) Chiang K-h (Chinese Taipei) Tsai P-l	13	17
2	(Russia) V Sorokina (Russia) N Vislova	21	21

Quarterfinals
(United States) I Wang (United States) R Wang	15	20
2	(Russia) V Sorokina (Russia) N Vislova	21	22

== Mixed doubles ==
=== Seeds ===
1. (Russia) Alexandr Nikolaenko / Valeria Sorokina (second round)
2. (Canada) Toby Ng / Grace Gao (semi-final)
3. (Japan) Kenichi Hayakawa / Misaki Matsutomo (final)
4. (Austria) Roman Zirnwald / Elisabeth Baldauf (second round)

=== Finals ===
Semifinals
(United States) Tony Gunawan (Indonesia) Vita Marissa	21	21
(United States) Howard Bach (United States) Eva Lee	13	7
3	(Japan) Kenichi Hayakawa (Japan) Misaki Matsutomo	21	15	21
2	(Canada) Toby Ng (Canada) Grace Gao	18	21	19

Final
(United States) Tony Gunawan (Indonesia) Vita Marissa	21	21
3	(Japan) Kenichi Hayakawa (Japan) Misaki Matsutomo	13	10

=== Top half ===
==== Section 1 ====
First Round
1	(Russia) A Nikolaenko (Russia) V Sorokina
BYE
(United States) T Gunawan (Indonesia) V Marissa	10	21	21
(United States) Lee HL (United States) P Lun	21	12	6
(United States) S Wibowo (United States) P Pongasavithas
BYE
(Japan) H Endo (Japan) A Takahashi	21	21
(Chinese Taipei) Chen C-j (Chinese Taipei) Chang Y-l	16	15

Second Round
1	(Russia) A Nikolaenko (Russia) V Sorokina	11	11
(United States) T Gunawan (Indonesia) V Marissa	21	21
(United States) S Wibowo (United States) P Phongasavithas	12	11
(Japan) H Endo (Japan) A Takahashi	21	21

Quarterfinals
(United States) T Gunawan (Indonesia) V Marissa	21	21
(Japan) H Endo (Japan) A Takahashi	17	17

==== Section 2 ====
First Round
4	(Austria) R Zirnwald (Austria) E Baldauf
BYE
(United States) H Bach (United States) E Lee	21	21
(Canada) A Liu (Canada) C Tsai	13	14
(United States) A Chong (United States) R Yeh
BYE
(United States) A Setiadi (United States) Rong B	wo
(Canada) N Yakura (Canada) P Chan

Second Round
4	(Austria) R Zirnwald (Austria) E Baldauf	10	11
(United States) H Bach (United States) E Lee	21	21
(United States) A Chong (United States) R Yeh	16	18
(Canada) N Yakura (Canada) P Chan	21	21

Quarterfinals
(United States) H Bach (United States) E Lee	21	21
(Canada) N Yakura (Canada) P Chan	3	13

=== Bottom half ===
==== Section 3 ====
First Round
(Mexico) A Lopez (United States) R Yeh	16	21	20
(United States) P Chew (United States) J Subandhi	21	16	22
BYE
(United States) E Go (United States) P Obanana
(United States) A Amphie (Singapore) Zhang BW	19	26	26
(United States) K Emerick (United States) Chen K-y	21	24	24
BYE
3	(Japan) K Hayakawa (Japan) M Matsutomo

Second Round
(United States) P Chew (United States) J Subandhi	16	21	21
(United States) E Go (United States) P Obanana	21	13	16
(United States) A Amphie (Singapore) Zhang BW	21	13	14
3	(Japan) K Hayakawa (Japan) M Matsutomo	12	21	21

Quarterfinals
(United States) P Chew (United States) J Subandhi	9	21	15
3	(Japan) K Hayakawa (Japan) M Matsutomo	21	17	21

==== Section 4 ====
First Round
(United States) K Hui (Chinese Taipei) C Chow	21	21
(Mexico) A Quadri (Mexico) N Gonzalez	16	8
BYE
(Chinese Taipei) Lu C-b (Chinese Taipei) Pai H-m
(United States) R Chew (United States) M Mangkalakiri	21	21
(Brazil) R Salles (Brazil) T Cruz	10	16
BYE
2	(Canada) T Ng (Canada) G Gao

Second Round
(United States) K Hui (United States) C Chow	15	6
(Chinese Taipei) Lu C-b (Chinese Taipei) Pai H-m	21	21
(United States) R Chew (United States) M Mangkalakiri	9	10
2	(Canada) T Ng (Canada) G Gao	21	21

Quarterfinals
(Chinese Taipei) Lu C-b (Chinese Taipei) Pai H-m	21	20	20
2	(Canada) T Ng (Canada) G Gao	15	22	22

Preceded by 2012 Russia Open Grand Prix	BWF Grand Prix Gold and Grand Prix; 2012 season	Succeeded by 2012 Canada Open Grand Prix
