= 2012 BWF Super Series =

Tournament details
- Dates: 3 January – 16 December 2012
- Edition: 6th

The 2012 BWF Super Series was the sixth season of the BWF Super Series. The season started with a Super Series Premier event in Korea and ended in Hong Kong. The season-ending Masters Finals were held in Shenzhen, China from December 12–16, 2012.

== Schedule ==
Below is the schedule released by the Badminton World Federation:

Tour	Official title	Venue	City	Date		Prize money USD	Report
Tour	Official title	Venue	City	Start	Finish	Prize money USD	Report
1	(South Korea) Korea Open Super Series Premier	SK Handball Stadium	Seoul	January 3	January 8	1,000,000	Report
2	Malaysia Open Super Series	Putra Indoor Stadium	Kuala Lumpur	January 10	January 15	400,000	Report
3	All England Super Series Premier	Arena Birmingham	Birmingham	March 6	March 11	350,000	Report
4	India Open Super Series	Siri Fort Sports Complex	New Delhi	April 24	April 29	200,000	Report
5	Indonesia Super Series Premier	Istora Senayan	Jakarta	June 12	June 17	650,000	Report
6	Singapore Super Series	Singapore Indoor Stadium	Singapore	June 19	June 24	200,000	Report
7	China Masters Super Series	Olympic Sports Centre Xincheng Gymnasium	Changzhou	September 11	September 16	250,000	Report
8	Japan Super Series	Yoyogi National Gymnasium	Tokyo	September 18	September 23	200,000	Report
9	Denmark Super Series Premier	Odense Sports Park	Odense	October 16	October 21	400,000	Report
10	(France) French Super Series	Stade Pierre de Coubertin	Paris	October 23	October 28	200,000	Report
11	China Open Super Series Premier	Yuanshen Sports Center Stadium	Shanghai	November 13	November 18	350,000	Report
12	Hong Kong Super Series	Hong Kong Coliseum	Kowloon	November 20	November 25	350,000	Report
13	(China) Super Series Masters Finals	Shenzhen Bay Sports Center	Shenzhen	December 12	December 16	500,000	Report

Super Series Premier

== Results ==
=== Winners ===
Tour	Men's singles	Women's singles	Men's doubles	Women's doubles	Mixed doubles
(South Korea) Korea	(Malaysia) Lee Chong Wei	(China) Wang Shixian	(China) Cai Yun (China) Fu Haifeng	(China) Tian Qing (China) Zhao Yunlei	(China) Xu Chen (China) Ma Jin
Malaysia	(Malaysia) Lee Chong Wei	(China) Wang Yihan	(Chinese Taipei) Fang Chieh-min (Chinese Taipei) Lee Sheng-mu	(Denmark) Christinna Pedersen (Denmark) Kamilla Rytter Juhl	(China) Zhang Nan (China) Zhao Yunlei
England	(China) Lin Dan	(China) Li Xuerui	(South Korea) Jung Jae-sung (South Korea) Lee Yong-dae	(China) Tian Qing (China) Zhao Yunlei	(Indonesia) Tontowi Ahmad (Indonesia) Liliyana Natsir
India	(South Korea) Son Wan-ho	(China) Li Xuerui	(Thailand) Bodin Issara (Thailand) Maneepong Jongjit	(South Korea) Jung Kyung-eun (South Korea) Kim Ha-na	(Indonesia) Tontowi Ahmad (Indonesia) Liliyana Natsir
Indonesia	(Indonesia) Simon Santoso	(India) Saina Nehwal	(South Korea) Jung Jae-sung (South Korea) Lee Yong-dae	(China) Wang Xiaoli (China) Yu Yang	(Thailand) Sudket Prapakamol (Thailand) Saralee Thungthongkam
Singapore	(Thailand) Boonsak Ponsana	(Germany) Juliane Schenk	(Indonesia) Markis Kido (Indonesia) Hendra Setiawan	(China) Bao Yixin (China) Zhong Qianxin	(Chinese Taipei) Chen Hung-ling (Chinese Taipei) Cheng Wen-hsing
China Masters	(China) Chen Long	(China) Wang Yihan	(China) Zhang Nan (China) Chai Biao	(China) Bao Yixin (China) Zhong Qianxin	(China) Xu Chen (China) Ma Jin
Japan	(Malaysia) Lee Chong Wei	(Chinese Taipei) Tai Tzu-ying	(South Korea) Kim Gi-jung (South Korea) Kim Sa-rang	(Hong Kong) Poon Lok Yan (Hong Kong) Tse Ying Suet	(Malaysia) Chan Peng Soon (Malaysia) Goh Liu Ying
Denmark	(Malaysia) Lee Chong Wei	(India) Saina Nehwal	(South Korea) Shin Baek-cheol (South Korea) Yoo Yeon-seong	(China) Ma Jin (China) Tang Jinhua	(China) Xu Chen (China) Ma Jin
France	(Malaysia) Liew Daren	(Japan) Minatsu Mitani	(South Korea) Lee Yong-dae (South Korea) Ko Sung-hyun	(China) Ma Jin (China) Tang Jinhua	(China) Xu Chen (China) Ma Jin
China Open	(China) Chen Long	(China) Li Xuerui	(Denmark) Mathias Boe (Denmark) Carsten Mogensen	(China) Wang Xiaoli (China) Yu Yang	(China) Xu Chen (China) Ma Jin
Hong Kong	(China) Chen Long	(China) Li Xuerui	(China) Cai Yun (China) Fu Haifeng	(China) Tian Qing (China) Zhao Yunlei	(China) Zhang Nan (China) Zhao Yunlei
(China) Masters Finals	(China) Chen Long	(China) Li Xuerui	(Denmark) Mathias Boe (Denmark) Carsten Mogensen	(China) Wang Xiaoli (China) Yu Yang	(Denmark) Joachim Fischer Nielsen (Denmark) Christinna Pedersen

=== Performance by countries ===
Tabulated below are the Super Series performances based on countries. Only countries who have won a title are listed:

Team	KOR	MAS	ENG	IND	INA	SIN	CHN	JPN	DEN	FRA	CHN	HKG	SSF	Total
China	4	2	3	1	1	1	5		2	2	4	5	3	33
Korea			1	2	1			1	1	1				7
Malaysia	1	1						2	1	1				6
Denmark		1									1		2	4
Indonesia			1	1	1	1								4
Thailand				1	1	1								3
Chinese Taipei		1				1		1						3
India					1				1					2
Germany						1								1
Hong Kong								1						1
Japan										1				1

== Finals ==
=== Korea ===
Category	Winners	Runners-up	Score
Men's singles	(Malaysia) Lee Chong Wei	(China) Lin Dan	12–21, 21–18, 21–14
Women's singles	(China) Wang Shixian	(China) Jiang Yanjiao	21–12, 21–17
Men's doubles	(China) Cai Yun / Fu Haifeng	(South Korea) Jung Jae-sung / Lee Yong-dae	18–21, 21–17, 21–19
Women's doubles	(China) Tian Qing / Zhao Yunlei	(South Korea) Ha Jung-eun / Kim Min-jung	21–18, 21–13
Mixed doubles	(China) Xu Chen / Ma Jin	(South Korea) Lee Yong-dae / Ha Jung-eun	21–12, 19–21, 21–10

=== Malaysia ===
Category	Winners	Runners-up	Score
Men's singles	(Malaysia) Lee Chong Wei	(Japan) Kenichi Tago	21–6, 21–13
Women's singles	(China) Wang Yihan	(China) Wang Xin	21–19, 21–11
Men's doubles	(Chinese Taipei) Fang Chieh-min / Lee Sheng-mu	(South Korea) Cho Gun-woo / Shin Baek-cheol	16–21, 21–16, 21–16
Women's doubles	(Denmark) Christinna Pedersen / Kamilla Rytter Juhl	(South Korea) Ha Jung-eun / Kim Min-jung	21–19, 21–18
Mixed doubles	(China) Zhang Nan / Zhao Yunlei	(China) Xu Chen / Ma Jin	21–12, 21–9

=== All England ===
Category	Winners	Runners-up	Score
Men's singles	(China) Lin Dan	(Malaysia) Lee Chong Wei	21–19, 6–2^{r}
Women's singles	(China) Li Xuerui	(China) Wang Yihan	21–13, 21–19
Men's doubles	(South Korea) Jung Jae-sung / Lee Yong-dae	(China) Cai Yun / Fu Haifeng	21–23, 21–9, 21–14
Women's doubles	(China) Tian Qing / Zhao Yunlei	(China) Wang Xiaoli / Yu Yang	21–17, 21–12
Mixed doubles	(Indonesia) Tontowi Ahmad / Liliyana Natsir	(Denmark) Thomas Laybourn / Kamilla Rytter Juhl	21–17, 21–19

=== India ===
Category	Winners	Runners-up	Score
Men's singles	(South Korea) Son Wan-ho	(Malaysia) Lee Chong Wei	21–18, 14–21, 21–19
Women's singles	(China) Li Xuerui	(Germany) Juliane Schenk	14–21, 21–17, 21–8
Men's doubles	(Thailand) Bodin Issara / Maneepong Jongjit	(South Korea) Ko Sung-hyun / Yoo Yeon-seong	21–17, 14–21, 21–14
Women's doubles	(South Korea) Jung Kyung-eun / Kim Ha-na	(China) Bao Yixin / Zhong Qianxin	21–17, 21–18
Mixed doubles	(Indonesia) Tontowi Ahmad / Liliyana Natsir	(Thailand) Sudket Prapakamol / Saralee Thungthongkam	21–16, 12–21, 21–14

=== Indonesia ===
Category	Winners	Runners-up	Score
Men's singles	(Indonesia) Simon Santoso	(China) Du Pengyu	21–18, 13–21, 21–11
Women's singles	(India) Saina Nehwal	(China) Li Xuerui	13–21, 22–20, 21–19
Men's doubles	(South Korea) Jung Jae-sung / Lee Yong-dae	(Denmark) Mathias Boe / Carsten Mogensen	23–21, 19–21, 21–11
Women's doubles	(China) Wang Xiaoli / Yu Yang	(China) Tian Qing / Zhao Yunlei	17–21, 21–9, 21–16
Mixed doubles	(Thailand) Sudket Prapakamol / Saralee Thungthongkam	(Indonesia) Tontowi Ahmad / Liliyana Natsir	21–17, 17–21, 21–13

=== Singapore ===
Category	Winners	Runners-up	Score
Men's singles	(Thailand) Boonsak Ponsana	(China) Wang Zhengming	21–18, 21–19
Women's singles	(Germany) Juliane Schenk	(Chinese Taipei) Cheng Shao-chieh	21–11, 26–24
Men's doubles	(Indonesia) Markis Kido / Hendra Setiawan	(South Korea) Ko Sung-hyun / Yoo Yeon-seong	22–20, 11–21, 21–6
Women's doubles	(China) Bao Yixin / Zhong Qianxin	(Chinese Taipei) Cheng Wen-hsing / Chien Yu-chin	21–12, 21–17
Mixed doubles	(Chinese Taipei) Chen Hung-ling / Cheng Wen-hsing	(Japan) Shintaro Ikeda / Reiko Shiota	21–17, 21–11

=== China Masters ===
Category	Winners	Runners-up	Score
Men's singles	(China) Chen Long	(Hong Kong) Hu Yun	21–11, 21–13
Women's singles	(China) Wang Yihan	(China) Jiang Yanjiao	21–18, 21–14
Men's doubles	(China) Chai Biao / Zhang Nan	(Japan) Hiroyuki Endo / Kenichi Hayakawa	21–18, 21–17
Women's doubles	(China) Bao Yixin / Zhong Qianxin	(China) Cheng Shu / Luo Yu	21–12, 21–15
Mixed doubles	(China) Xu Chen / Ma Jin	(China) Qiu Zihan / Tang Jinhua	14–21, 21–11, 21–10

=== Japan ===
Category	Winners	Runners-up	Score
Men's singles	(Malaysia) Lee Chong Wei	(Thailand) Boonsak Ponsana	21–18, 21–18
Women's singles	(Chinese Taipei) Tai Tzu-ying	(Japan) Eriko Hirose	9–21, 21–9, 21–14
Men's doubles	(South Korea) Kim Gi-jung / Kim Sa-rang	(Malaysia) Koo Kien Keat / Tan Boon Heong	21–16, 21–19
Women's doubles	(Hong Kong) Poon Lok Yan / Tse Ying Suet	(Japan) Shizuka Matsuo / Mami Naito	21–17, 22–20
Mixed doubles	(Malaysia) Chan Peng Soon / Goh Liu Ying	(Indonesia) Muhammad Rijal / Liliyana Natsir	21–12, 21–19

=== Denmark ===
Category	Winners	Runners-up	Score
Men's singles	(Malaysia) Lee Chong Wei	(China) Du Pengyu	15–21, 21–12, 21–19
Women's singles	(India) Saina Nehwal	(Germany) Juliane Schenk	21–17, 21–8
Men's doubles	(South Korea) Shin Baek-cheol / Yoo Yeon-seong	(Malaysia) Koo Kien Keat / Tan Boon Heong	19–21, 21–11, 21–19
Women's doubles	(China) Ma Jin / Tang Jinhua	(Japan) Misaki Matsutomo / Ayaka Takahashi	21–8, 21–12
Mixed doubles	(China) Xu Chen / Ma Jin	(Indonesia) Tontowi Ahmad / Liliyana Natsir	23–21, 24–26, 21–11

=== France ===
Category	Winners	Runners-up	Score
Men's singles	(Malaysia) Liew Daren	(Denmark) Viktor Axelsen	21–18, 21–17
Women's singles	(Japan) Minatsu Mitani	(India) Saina Nehwal	21–19, 21–11
Men's doubles	(South Korea) Ko Sung-hyun / Lee Yong-dae	(Thailand) Bodin Issara / Maneepong Jongjit	22–24, 21–17, 21–11
Women's doubles	(China) Ma Jin / Tang Jinhua	(Denmark) Christinna Pedersen / Kamilla Rytter Juhl	21–12, 23–21
Mixed doubles	(China) Xu Chen / Ma Jin	(China) Qiu Zihan / Bao Yixin	21–17, 19–21, 21–18

=== China Open ===
Category	Winners	Runners-up	Score
Men's singles	(China) Chen Long	(China) Wang Zhengming	21–19, 21–18
Women's singles	(China) Li Xuerui	(Thailand) Ratchanok Intanon	21–12, 21–9
Men's doubles	(Denmark) Mathias Boe / Carsten Mogensen	(South Korea) Ko Sung-hyun / Lee Yong-dae	21–15, 21–14
Women's doubles	(China) Wang Xiaoli / Yu Yang	(Japan) Miyuki Maeda / Satoko Suetsuna	21–19, 14–7 Retired
Mixed doubles	(China) Xu Chen / Ma Jin	(Malaysia) Chan Peng Soon / Goh Liu Ying	21–15, 21–17

=== Hong Kong ===
Category	Winners	Runners-up	Score
Men's singles	(China) Chen Long	(Malaysia) Lee Chong Wei	21–19, 21–17
Women's singles	(China) Li Xuerui	(China) Wang Yihan	21–12, 11–3 Retired
Men's doubles	(China) Cai Yun / Fu Haifeng	(Malaysia) Koo Kien Keat / Tan Boon Heong	21–16, 21–17
Women's doubles	(China) Tian Qing / Zhao Yunlei	(China) Wang Xiaoli / Yu Yang	22–20, 14–21, 21–17
Mixed doubles	(China) Zhang Nan / Zhao Yunlei	(China) Xu Chen / Ma Jin	21–17, 21–17

=== Masters Finals ===
Category	Winners	Runners-up	Score
Men's singles	(China) Chen Long	(China) Du Pengyu	21–12, 21–13
Women's singles	(China) Li Xuerui	(China) Wang Shixian	21–9, 15–4 Retired
Men's doubles	(Denmark) Mathias Boe / Carsten Mogensen	(Japan) Hiroyuki Endo / Kenichi Hayakawa	21–17, 21–19
Women's doubles	(China) Wang Xiaoli / Yu Yang	(Denmark) Christinna Pedersen / Kamilla Rytter Juhl	21–16, 21–14
Mixed doubles	(Denmark) Joachim Fischer Nielsen / Christinna Pedersen	(China) Zhang Nan / Zhao Yunlei	17–21, 21–12, 21–14
