= 2012 U.S. Open =

2012 U.S. Open may refer to:

- 2012 U.S. Open (golf), a major golf tournament
- 2012 US Open (tennis), a grand slam tennis event
- 2012 Lamar Hunt U.S. Open Cup, a soccer tournament for US teams
- 2012 U.S. Open Grand Prix Gold, a badminton tournament
