= 2012 China Masters Super Series =

Tournament details
- Dates: September 11, 2012 - September 16, 2012
- Total prize money: US$400,000
- Location: Changzhou, China

The 2012 China Masters Super Series was the seventh super series tournament of the 2012 BWF Super Series. The tournament was held in Changzhou, China from September 11–16, 2012 and had a total purse of $400,000. The draw was released on August 28, 2012.

== Men's singles ==
=== Seeds ===
1. (China) Chen Long
2. (China) Chen Jin
3. (Japan) Kenichi Tago
4. (China) Du Pengyu
5. (Denmark) Jan Ø. Jørgensen
6. (Denmark) Hans-Kristian Vittinghus
7. (China) Wang Zhengming
8. (India) Kashyap Parupalli
9. (Hong Kong) Hu Yun
10. (Hong Kong) Wong Wing Ki
11. (Thailand) Boonsak Ponsana
12. (Denmark) Viktor Axelsen
13. (India) Ajay Jayaram
14. (Malaysia) Liew Daren
15. (Malaysia) Muhammad Hafiz Hashim
16. (Chinese Taipei) Hsu Jen-hao

=== Players by nation ===
Nation	First round	Second round	Quarterfinals	Semifinals	Final
(China)	8	6	4	2	1
(Hong Kong)	2	1	1	1	1
(India)	5	4	3	2	
(Denmark)	3	1			
(Malaysia)	3	1			
(Singapore)	2	1			
(Chinese Taipei)	2	1			
(Israel)	1	1			
(Japan)	2				
(Thailand)	2				
(France)	1				
(Republic of Ireland)	1				

=== Top half ===
First Round
1	(China) Chen L	20	21	21
(Denmark) V Axelsen	22	7	8
(Republic of Ireland) S Evans	22	17
(Israel) M Zilberman	24	21
8	(India) K Parupalli	21	14	21
Q	(China) Gao H	13	21	19
(India) Gurusai Datt	21	19	21
(Malaysia) M H Hashim	18	21	13
4	(China) Du PY	21	15	21
(Japan) T Ueda	14	21	11
(France) B Leverdez	10	16
Q	(China) Zhou WL	21	21
7	(China) Wang ZM	21
(Thailand) T Saensomboonsuk	11	r
(Thailand) B Ponsana	21	16	12
(Malaysia) Chong W F	11	21	21

Second Round
1	(China) Chen L	21	21
(Israel) M Zilberman	13	3
8	(India) K Parupalli	21	18	4
(India) Gurusai Datt	16	21	21
4	(China) Du PY	22	21
Q	(China) Zhou WL	20	12
7	(China) Wang ZM	19	23	21
(Malaysia) Chong W F	21	21	10

Quarterfinals
1	(China) Chen L	21	21
(India) Gurusai Datt	8	12
4	(China) Du PY	21	21
7	(China) Wang ZM	11	12

Semifinals
1	(China) Chen L	w	/	o
4	(China) Du PY

=== Bottom half ===
First Round
(India) S Varma	19	21	21
(Malaysia) D Liew	21	17	12
(Chinese Taipei) Hsu J-h	21	14	21
5	(Denmark) J Ø. Jørgensen	13	21	19
(Hong Kong) Wong W K	17	21	19
(Singapore) D Wong	21	11	21
(India) A Jayaram	21	21
3	(Japan) K Tago	13	17
Q	(China) Qiao B	21	21
Q	(China) Chen YK	10	8
(Singapore) Y Ashton Chen	17	19
6	(Denmark) H-K Vittinghus	21	21
(Hong Kong) Hu Y	21	21
(Chinese Taipei) Hsu J-h	19	18
(India) A Pawar	17	12
2	(China) Chen J	21	21

Second Round
(India) S Varma	21	21
(Chinese Taipei) Hsu J-h	12	16
(Singapore) D Wong	17	9
(India) A Jayaram	21	21
Q	(China) Qiao B	21	21
6	(Denmark) H-K Vittinghus	15	14
(Hong Kong) Hu Y
2	(China) Chen J	r

Quarterfinals
(India) S Varma	21	14	16
(India) A Jayaram	12	21	21
Q	(China) Qiao B	17	9
(Hong Kong) Hu Y	21	21

Semifinals
(India) A Jayaram	16	18
(Hong Kong) Hu Y	21	21

=== Finals ===
Semifinals
1	(China) Chen Long	w	/	o
4	(China) Du Pengyu
(India) Ajay Jayaram	16	18
(Hong Kong) Hu Yun	21	21

Final
(China) Chen Long	21	21
(Hong Kong) Hu Yun	11	13

== Women's singles ==
=== Seeds ===
1. (China) Wang Yihan
2. (China) Li Xuerui
3. (China) Wang Shixian
4. (China) Jiang Yanjiao
5. (Thailand) Ratchanok Inthanon
6. (Thailand) Porntip Buranaprasertsuk
7. (China) Liu Xin
8. (Singapore) Gu Juan

=== Top half ===
First Round
(Japan) N Okuhara	13	21	21
(China) Yao X	21	10	11
(China) Wang L	20	17
(Japan) M Mitani	22	21
(Thailand) S Taerattanachai	21	21
(Japan) K Imabeppu	15	17

Second Round
1	(China) Wang YH	21	22
(Singapore) Fu MT	12	20
5	(Thailand) R Inthanon	21	21
(Japan) N Okuhara	17	15
3	(China) Wang SX	13	18
(Japan) M Mitani	21	21
(China) Liu X	20	8
(Thailand) S Taerattanachai	22	21

Quarterfinals
1	(China) Wang YH	21	21
5	(Thailand) R Inthanon	15	17
(Japan) M Mitani	13	13
(Thailand) S Taerattanachai	21	21

Semifinals
1	(China) Wang YH	21	21
(Thailand) S Taerattanachai	13	9

=== Bottom half ===
First Round
(China) Chen XJ	21	15	20
(Thailand) B Ongbumrungpan	14	21	22
(Japan) E Hirose
(China) Han L	r
(India) P V Sindhu	21	21
(United States) J Subandhi	15	12

Second Round
(Thailand) B Ongbumrungpan	21	23
7	(Singapore) Gu J	18	21
(Japan) E Hirose	12	11
4	(China) Jiang YJ	21	21
(India) P V Sindhu	10	21	21
(Thailand) P Buranaprasertsuk	21	7	19
(Austria) S Prütsch	8	15
2	(China) Li XR	21	21

Quarterfinals
(Thailand) B Ongbumrungpan	15	21	15
4	(China) Jiang YJ	21	16	21
(India) P V Sindhu	21	9	21
2	(China) Li XR	19	21	16

Semifinals
4	(China) Jiang YJ	21	14	21
(India) P V Sindhu	10	21	19

=== Finals ===
Semifinals
1	(China) Wang Yihan	21	21
(Thailand) Sapsiree Taerattanachai	13	9
4	(China) Jiang Yanjiao	21	14	21
(India) P V Sindhu	10	21	19

Final
1	(China) Wang Yihan	21	21
4	(China) Jiang Yanjiao	18	14

== Men's doubles ==
=== Top half ===
Round 1
(Thailand) P Chalardchaleam (Thailand) N Puangpuapech	21	17	21
(India) P J Chopra (India) A Dewalker	11	21	18
(Denmark) R Bonde (Denmark) M Conrad-Petersen	18	21	21
(India) K Tarun (India) A Vishnu	21	12	19

Round 2
1	(Japan) H Endo (Japan) K Hayakawa	21	21
(Japan) T Inoue (Japan) Y Kaneko	14	15
5	(Malaysia) Hoon T H (Malaysia) Tan W K	21	21
(Thailand) P Chalardchaleam (Thailand) N Puangpuapech	18	18
4	(Thailand) B Issara (Thailand) M Jongjit	21	21
(Singapore) Ashton Chen Y Z (Singapore) D Wong	9	13
7	(Malaysia) M Z A Latif (Malaysia) M F M Tazari	21	13	13
(Denmark) R Bonde (Denmark) M Conrad-Petersen	16	21	21

Quarterfinals
1	(Japan) H Endo (Japan) K Hayakawa	22	21
5	(Malaysia) Hoon T H (Malaysia) Tan W K	20	17
4	(Thailand) B Issara (Thailand) M Jongjit	21	21
(Denmark) R Bonde (Denmark) M Conrad-Petersen	12	18

Semifinals
1	(Japan) H Endo (Japan) K Hayakawa	21	19	21
4	(Thailand) B Issara (Thailand) M Jongjit	18	21	11

=== Bottom half ===
Round 1
(United States) P Chew (United States) S Pongnairat	14	21	8
(China) Li G (China) Liu C	21	17	21
(Malaysia) Chan P S (Malaysia) Ong J G	18	18
(Thailand) S Anugritayawon (Thailand) S Prapakamol	21	21

Round 2
(China) Li G (China) Liu C	13	18
8	(Malaysia) Gan T C (Malaysia) Ong S H	21	21
(China) Chai B (China) Zhang N	21	21
3	(China) Liu XL (China) Qiu ZH	11	17
(Thailand) S Anugritayawon (Thailand) S Prapakamol
6	(Malaysia) Goh V S (Malaysia) Lim K W	WO
(China) Guo ZD (China) Xu C	18	16
2	(China) Hong W (China) Shen Y	21	21

Quarterfinals
(Malaysia) Gan T C (Malaysia) Ong S H	17	17
(China) Chai B (China) Zhang N	21	21
(Thailand) S Anugritayawon (Thailand) S Prapakamol	12	8
2	(China) Hong W (China) Shen Y	21	21

Semifinals
(China) Chai B (China) Zhang N	21	23
2	(China) Hong W (China) Shen Y	13	21

=== Finals ===
Semifinals
1	(Japan) H Endo (Japan) K Hayakawa	21	19	21
4	(Thailand) B Issara (Thailand) M Jongjit	18	21	11
(China) Chai B (China) Zhang N	21	23
2	(China) Hong W (China) Shen Y	13	21

Final
1	(Japan) H Endo (Japan) K Hayakawa	18	17
(China) Chai B (China) Zhang N	21	21

== Women's doubles ==
=== result ===
Quarterfinals
1	(China) Bao YX (China) Zhong QX	21	19	21
7	(Thailand) S Amitapai (Thailand) S Taerattanachai	15	21	16
4	(Thailand) D Aroonkesorn (Thailand) K Voravichitchaikul	21	21	18
8	(Malaysia) Goh L Y (Malaysia) Lim Y L	23	10	21
6	(Malaysia) Ng H E (Malaysia) Ng H L	10	14
3	(Japan) S Matsuo (Japan) M Naito	21	21
5	(China) Cheng S (China) Luo Y	w	/	o
2	(China) Xia H (China) Tang JH

Semifinals
1	(China) Bao YX (China) Zhong QX	21	21
8	(Malaysia) Goh L Y (Malaysia) Lim Y L	1	14
3	(Japan) S Matsuo (Japan) M Naito	16	13
5	(China) Cheng S (China) Luo Y	21	21

Final
1	(China) Bao Yixin (China) Zhong Qianxin	21	21
5	(China) Cheng Shu (China) Luo Yu	12	15

== Mixed doubles ==
=== Seeds ===
1. (China) Xu Chen / (China) Ma Jin
2. (Thailand) Sudket Prapakamol / (Thailand) Saralee Thungthongkam
3. (Malaysia) Chan Peng Soon / (Malaysia) Goh Liu Ying
4. (Thailand) Maneepong Jongjit / (Thailand) Savitree Amitrapai

=== Result ===
Round 1
7	(Denmark) A Kristiansen (Denmark) J Houmann	22	21
(United States) P Chew (United States) J Subandhi	20	9
6	(China) Tao JM (China) Bao YX	21	21
(Malaysia) Gan T C (Malaysia) Ng H L	17	16
(Malaysia) Ong J G (Malaysia) Lim Y L	21	21
8	(India) K Tarun (India) A Ponnappa	9	14
(China) Qiu ZH (China) Tang JH	21
4	(Thailand) M Jongjit (Thailand) S Amitapai	16	r
(China) Liu C (China) Luo Y	21	21
(Thailand) S Anugritayawon (Thailand) K Voravichitchaikul	14	16

Quarterfinals
1	(China) Xu C (China) Ma J	21	21
7	(Denmark) A Kristiansen (Denmark) J Houmann	14	16
3	(Malaysia) Chan P S (Malaysia) Goh L Y	15	21	21
6	(China) Tao JM (China) Bao YX	21	16	15
(Malaysia) Ong J G (Malaysia) Lim Y L	21	15	14
(China) Qiu ZH (China) Tang JH	13	21	21
(China) Liu C (China) Luo Y	12	12
2	(Thailand) S Prapakamol (Thailand) S Thoungthongkam	21	21

Semifinals
1	(China) Xu C (China) Ma J	21	15	21
3	(Malaysia) Chan P S (Malaysia) Goh L Y	18	21	11
(China) Qiu ZH (China) Tang JH	21	19	21
2	(Thailand) S Prapakamol (Thailand) S Thoungthongkam	16	21	17

Final
1	(China) Xu Chen (China) Ma Jin	14	21	21
(China) Qiu Zihan (China) Tang Jinhua	21	11	10

Preceded by 2011 China Masters Super Series	China Masters	Succeeded by 2013 China Masters Super Series
Preceded by 2012 Indonesia Super Series Premier	BWF Super Series; 2012 season	Succeeded by 2012 Japan Super Series
