= 2012 Pan Am Badminton Championships =

The XVII 2012 Pan Am Badminton Championships were held in Lima, Peru, between October 11 and October 14, 2012.

This event was part of the 2012 BWF Grand Prix Gold and Grand Prix series of the Badminton World Federation.

== Venue ==
- Manuel Bonilla Stadium, Miraflores, Lima

== Medalists ==
Event	Gold	Silver	Bronze
Men's singles	(Guatemala) Kevin Cordón	(Cuba) Osleni Guerrero	(United States) Howard Shu
Men's singles	(Guatemala) Kevin Cordón	(Cuba) Osleni Guerrero	(Brazil) Daniel Paiola
Women's singles	(Canada) Christin Tsai	(United States) Jamie Subandhi	(United States) Karyn Velez
Women's singles	(Canada) Christin Tsai	(United States) Jamie Subandhi	(Brazil) Yasmin Cury
Men's doubles	(Canada) Adrian Liu and Derrick Ng	(Brazil) Daniel Paiola and Alex Yuwan Tjong	(United States) Ryan Chew and Kyle Emerick
Men's doubles	(Canada) Adrian Liu and Derrick Ng	(Brazil) Daniel Paiola and Alex Yuwan Tjong	(Mexico) Andres Lopez and Lino Munoz
Women's doubles	(Canada) Alexandra Bruce and Phyllis Chan	(Canada) Jocelyn Ko and Christin Tsai	(United States) Rulan Yeh and Rulien Yeh
Women's doubles	(Canada) Alexandra Bruce and Phyllis Chan	(Canada) Jocelyn Ko and Christin Tsai	(Brazil) Paula Pereira and Fabiana Silva
Mixed doubles	(Canada) Derrick Ng and Alexandra Bruce	(Canada) Phillipe Charron and Phyllis Chan	(United States) Phillip Chew and Jamie Subandhi
Mixed doubles	(Canada) Derrick Ng and Alexandra Bruce	(Canada) Phillipe Charron and Phyllis Chan	(United States) Kyle Emerick and Rulan Yeh
Teams	Canada	United States	Brazil
