= Asumi Kugo =

Japanese badminton player

Personal information
- Born: 12 June 1990 (age 36) Nara Prefecture, Japan
- Height: 1.75 m (5 ft 9 in)

Sport
- Country: Japan
- Sport: Badminton
- Handedness: Right

Women's doubles
- Highest ranking: 56 (13 April 2017)
- BWF profile

Asumi Kugo (久後 あすみ, Kugo Asumi; born 12 June 1990) is a Japanese badminton player.

== Achievements ==
=== BWF International Challenge/Series (5 titles, 3 runners-up) ===
Women's doubles
Year	Tournament	Partner	Opponent	Score	Result	Ref.
2011	Polish Open	(Japan) Kana Ito	(Japan) Rie Eto (Japan) Yu Wakita	16–21, 9–21	(silver) Runner-up	
2012	Singapore International	(Japan) Megumi Yokoyama	(Japan) Yuki Fukushima (Japan) Yui Miyauchi	12–21, 21–16, 21–17	(gold) Winner	
2013	Malaysia International	(Japan) Yui Miyauchi	(Malaysia) Amelia Alicia Anscelly (Malaysia) Soong Fie Cho	21–17, 21–14	(gold) Winner	
2014	Osaka International	(Japan) Yui Miyauchi	(Japan) Shizuka Matsuo (Japan) Mami Naito	22–24, 6–21	(silver) Runner-up	
2016	White Nights	(Japan) Megumi Yokoyama	(Russia) Anastasia Chervyakova (Russia) Olga Morozova	21–17, 21–7	(gold) Winner	
2017	Orleans International	(Japan) Megumi Yokoyama	(France) Delphine Delrue (France) Lea Palermo	21–14, 17–21, 21–12	(gold) Winner	
2018	Finnish Open	(Japan) Megumi Yokoyama	(Malaysia) Goh Yea Ching (Malaysia) Yap Cheng Wen	22–24, 21–15, 21–13	(gold) Winner	
2018	White Nights	(Japan) Megumi Yokoyama	(Japan) Akane Araki (Japan) Riko Imai	18–21, 12–21	(silver) Runner-up	

BWF International Challenge tournament
BWF International Series tournament
