= Megumi Yokoyama (badminton) =

Japanese badminton player (born 1990)

Personal information
- Born: 31 July 1990 (age 36) Kumamoto Prefecture, Japan

Sport
- Country: Japan
- Sport: Badminton
- Handedness: Right

Women's doubles
- Highest ranking: 56 (13 April 2017)
- Current ranking: 142 (5 July 2018)
- BWF profile

Megumi Yokoyama (横山 めぐみ, Yokoyama Megumi; born 31 July 1990) is a Japanese badminton player.

== Achievements ==
=== BWF International Challenge/Series ===
Women's doubles
Year	Tournament	Partner	Opponent	Score	Result	Ref.
2012	Singapore International	(Japan) Asumi Kugo	(Japan) Yuki Fukushima (Japan) Yui Miyauchi	12–21, 21–16, 21–17	(gold) Winner	
2016	White Nights	(Japan) Asumi Kugo	(Russia) Anastasia Chervyakova (Russia) Olga Morozova	21–17, 21–7	(gold) Winner	
2017	Orleans International	(Japan) Asumi Kugo	(France) Delphine Delrue (France) Lea Palermo	21–14, 17–21, 21–12	(gold) Winner	
2018	Finnish Open	(Japan) Asumi Kugo	(Malaysia) Goh Yea Ching (Malaysia) Yap Cheng Wen	22–24, 21–15, 21–13	(gold) Winner	
2018	White Nights	(Japan) Asumi Kugo	(Japan) Akane Araki (Japan) Riko Imai	18–21, 12–21	(silver) Runner-up	

BWF International Challenge tournament
BWF International Series tournament
