= Marlin Maldonado =

Guatemalan badminton player (born 1985)

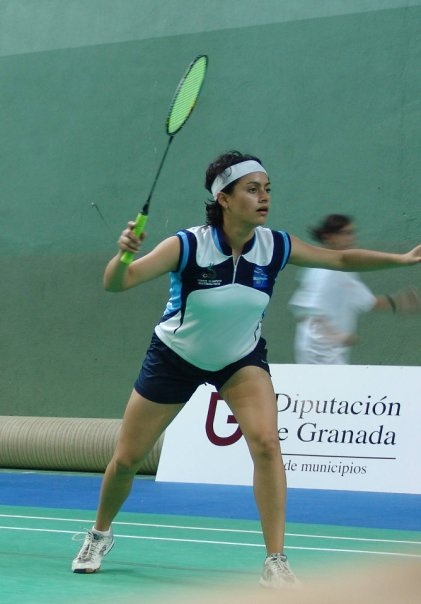
Personal information: Birth name / Marlin Maldonado Gonzalez; Country / Guatemala; Born / March 29, 1985 (age 33) Santa Cruz del Quiche, Quiche, Guatemala.; Years active / 1998-2008; Height / 5 ft 2 in (1.58 m); Weight / 120 lb (55 kg); Handedness / Right; Coach / José María Solís

Marlin Maldonado (born March 29, 1985, in Santa Cruz del Quiché) is a Guatemalan badminton player.

== Career ==
She won bronze at the 2006 Central American and Caribbean Games in the Women's doubles and in the Women's singles. In 2007 she won the Carebaco International. At the 2007 Pan American Badminton Championships she finished fifth in the Women's singles. She also reached rank 3 at the 2009 Peru International Badminton Championships in the Women's doubles and in the Mixed doubles.
