= Pai Hsiao-ma =

Taiwanese badminton player (born 1986)

Pai Hsiao-ma 白驍馬
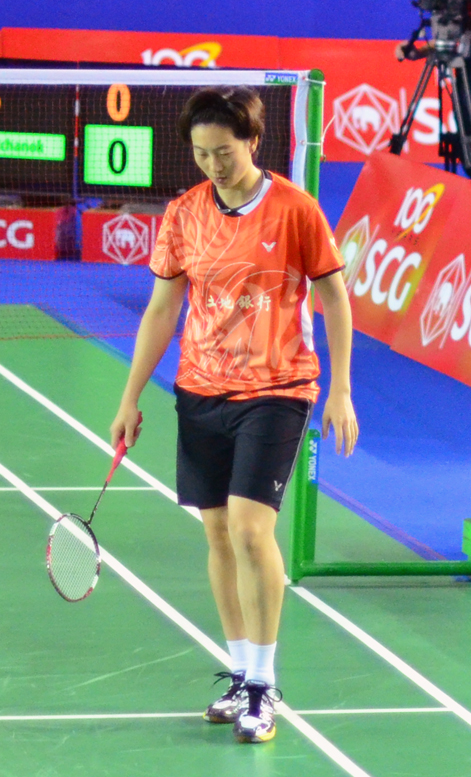

Personal information
- Born: 7 May 1986 (age 40)
- Height: 1.65 m (5 ft 5 in)
- Weight: 63 kg (139 lb)

Sport
- Country: Republic of China (Taiwan)
- Sport: Badminton
- Handedness: Right

Women's singles & doubles
- Highest ranking: 15 (WS 4 July 2013); 117 (WD 16 February 2012); 149 (XD 24 April 2014)
- BWF profile
Medal record
Women's badminton
Representing Chinese Taipei
Uber Cup
Bronze medal – third place	2006 Sendai & Tokyo	Women's team
East Asian Games
Silver medal – second place	2009 Hong Kong	Women's team
Silver medal – second place	2013 Tianjin	Women's team
Summer Universiade
Silver medal – second place	2011 Shenzhen	Women's singles
Silver medal – second place	2011 Shenzhen	Women's doubles
Bronze medal – third place	2007 Bangkok	Mixed team
Bronze medal – third place	2011 Shenzhen	Mixed team
Bronze medal – third place	2013 Kazan	Mixed team
Asian Junior Championships
Bronze medal – third place	2004 Hwacheon	Girls' team

Pai Hsiao-ma (Chinese: 白驍馬; born 7 May 1986), formerly known as Pai Min-jie, is a Taiwanese badminton player. She competed at the 2006, 2010 and 2014 Asian Games. She presented United States at her debut on 2023 BWF World Senior Championships hold in Jeonju, South Korea.

== Achievements ==
=== Summer Universiade ===
Women's singles
Year	Venue	Opponent	Score	Result
2011	Gymnasium of SZIIT, Shenzhen, China	(Chinese Taipei) Cheng Shao-chieh	18–21, 15–21	Silver

Women's doubles
Year	Venue	Partner	Opponent	Score	Result
2011	Gymnasium of SZIIT, Shenzhen, China	(Chinese Taipei) Cheng Shao-chieh	(South Korea) Eom Hye-won (South Korea) Chang Ye-na	11–21, 14–21	Silver

=== World University Championships ===
Women's singles
Year	Venue	Opponent	Score	Result
2012	Yeomju Gymnasium, Gwangju, South Korea	(Chinese Taipei) Tai Tzu-ying	13–21 retired	Silver

Women's doubles
Year	Venue	Partner	Opponent	Score	Result
2012	Yeomju Gymnasium, Gwangju, South Korea	(Chinese Taipei) Tai Tzu-ying	(Japan) Miri Ichimaru (Japan) Shiho Tanaka	20–22, 11–21	Silver

=== BWF Grand Prix (1 title) ===
The BWF Grand Prix had two levels, the BWF Grand Prix and Grand Prix Gold. It was a series of badminton tournaments sanctioned by the Badminton World Federation (BWF) which was held from 2007 to 2017.

Women's singles
Year	Tournament	Opponent	Score	Result
2012	U.S. Open	(Japan) Kaori Imabeppu	21–17, 16–21, 21–11	(gold) Winner

BWF Grand Prix Gold tournament
BWF Grand Prix tournament

=== BWF International Challenge/Series (3 titles, 1 runner-up) ===
Women's singles
Year	Tournament	Opponent	Score	Result
2011	Irish International	(Spain) Carolina Marín	12–21, 21–19, 21–7	(gold) Winner
2013	Polish Open	(Japan) Shizuka Uchida	Walkover	(silver) Runner-up
2013	Bangladesh International	(India) Saili Rane	21–10, 21–13	(gold) Winner
2014	Austrian International	(Chinese Taipei) Cheng Chi-ya	21–18, 21–11	(gold) Winner

BWF International Challenge tournament
BWF International Series tournament
