= Rulan Yeh =

American badminton player

Personal information
- Born: 4 September 1984 (age 41) Irvine Valley, California

Sport
- Country: United States
- Sport: Badminton
Medal record
Badminton
Representing United States
Pan Am Badminton Championships
Bronze medal – third place	2008 Lima	Women's doubles
Bronze medal – third place	2009 Guadalajara	Mixed doubles
Bronze medal – third place	2012 Lima	Women's doubles
Bronze medal – third place	2012 Lima	Mixed doubles

Rulan Yeh (born September 4, 1984) is an American badminton player who competes in international level events. She is a two-time bronze medalist at the Pan Am Badminton Championships. She is the twin sister of Rulien Yeh who is her doubles partner.
