= Rulien Yeh =

American badminton player

Personal information
- Nickname: Ruby
- Born: 4 September 1984 (age 41) Irvine Valley, California, U.S.
- Height: 5 ft 3 in (160 cm)

Sport
- Country: United States
- Sport: Badminton
- Retired: 2013
Medal record
Badminton
Representing United States
Pan Am Badminton Championships
Bronze medal – third place	2008 Lima	Women's doubles
Bronze medal – third place	2012 Lima	Women's doubles

Rulien Yeh (born 4 September 1984) is an American former badminton player who competed in international level events. She is a two-time bronze medalists at the Pan Am Badminton Championships, her doubles partner is her twin sister Rulan Yeh.

She has appeared in the films WEAPONiZED, Chance and Afterburn/Aftershock.
