= Kaori Imabeppu =

Japanese badminton player (born 1986)

Personal information
- Born: 7 September 1986 (age 40) Nara Prefecture, Japan
- Height: 1.57 m (5 ft 2 in)

Sport
- Country: Japan
- Sport: Badminton
- Handedness: Right

Women's singles
- Highest ranking: 23 (23 July 2015)
- BWF profile
Medal record
Women's badminton
Representing Japan
East Asian Games
Bronze medal – third place	2013 Tianjin	Women's team

Kaori Imabeppu (今別府 香里, Imabeppu Kaori; born 7 September 1986) is a Japanese badminton player, who is a singles specialist. In 2008, she won the Portugal and Croatian International tournaments in the women's singles event.

== Achievements ==
=== BWF Grand Prix ===
The BWF Grand Prix has two level, the Grand Prix and Grand Prix Gold. It is a series of badminton tournaments sanctioned by the Badminton World Federation (BWF) since 2007.

Women's singles
Year	Tournament	Opponent	Score	Result	Ref.
2011	Vietnam Open	(Singapore) Fu Mingtian	18–21, 21–16, 8–21	(silver) Runner-up	
2012	U.S. Open	(Chinese Taipei) Pai Hsiao-ma	17–21, 21–16, 11–21	(silver) Runner-up	
2014	Brasil Open	(United States) Beiwen Zhang	11–6, 5–11, 11–4, 8–11, 9–11	(silver) Runner-up	
2015	Canada Open	(Canada) Michelle Li	17–21, 23–25	(silver) Runner-up	

BWF Grand Prix Gold tournament
BWF Grand Prix tournament

=== BWF International Challenge/Series ===
Women's singles
Year	Tournament	Opponent	Score	Result	Ref.
2008	Croatian International	(Denmark) Nanna Brosolat Jensen	21–11, 21–17	(gold) Winner	
2008	Portugal International	(China) Zhang Xi	21–13, 21–15	(gold) Winner	
2010	Swedish International	(England) Elisabeth Cann	21–15, 21–10	(gold) Winner	
2010	Osaka International	(Macau) Wang Rong	22–20, 19–21, 17–21	(silver) Runner-up	
2011	Swedish Masters	(Japan) Mayu Sekiya	13–21, 22–20, 21–16	(gold) Winner	
2013	Osaka International	(Japan) Akane Yamaguchi	22–20, 21–16	(gold) Winner	
2014	USA International	(Japan) Sayaka Sato	21–19, 22–20	(gold) Winner	

BWF International Challenge tournament
BWF International Series tournament
