= Hiroyuki Endo =

Japanese badminton player (born 1986)

Hiroyuki Endō
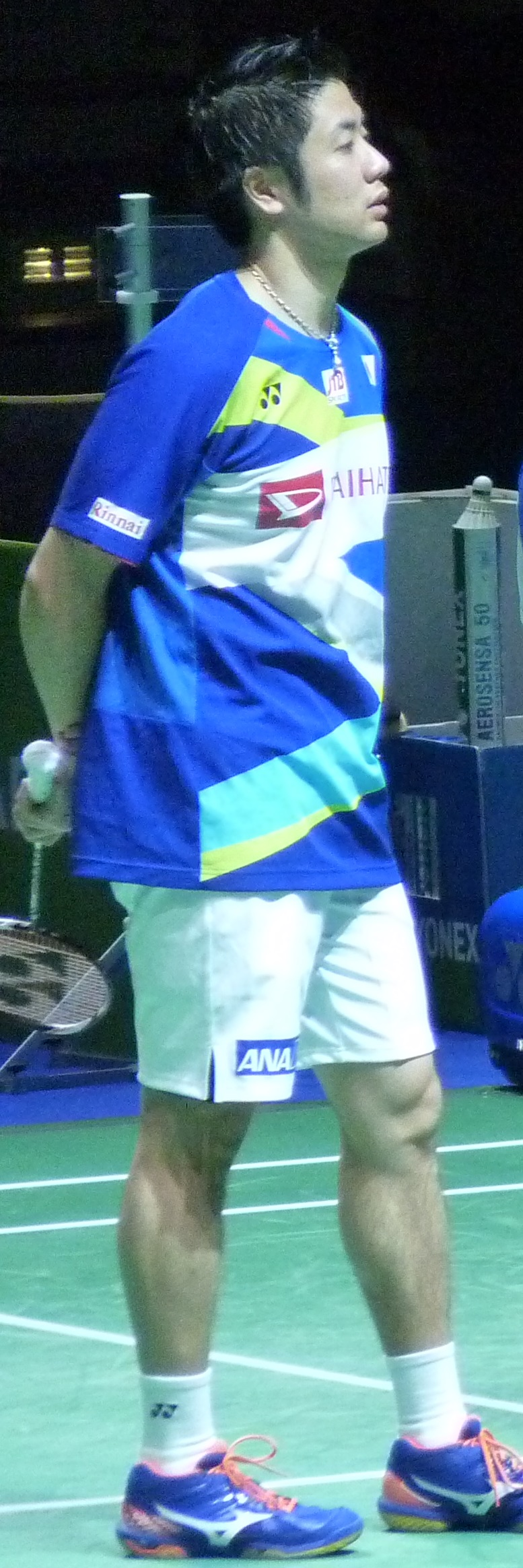

Personal information
- Born: 16 December 1986 (age 39) Kawaguchi, Saitama, Japan
- Height: 1.72 m (5 ft 8 in)
- Weight: 72 kg (159 lb)

Sport
- Country: Japan
- Sport: Badminton
- Handedness: Right
- Retired: 31 March 2022

Men's doubles
- Highest ranking: 2 (with Kenichi Hayakawa 19 June 2014); 4 (with Yuta Watanabe, 5 March 2019)
- BWF profile
Medal record
Men's badminton
Representing Japan
World Championships
Bronze medal – third place	2015 Jakarta	Men's doubles
Sudirman Cup
Silver medal – second place	2015 Dongguan	Mixed team
Silver medal – second place	2019 Nanning	Mixed team
Bronze medal – third place	2017 Gold Coast	Mixed team
Thomas Cup
Gold medal – first place	2014 New Delhi	Men's team
Silver medal – second place	2018 Bangkok	Men's team
Bronze medal – third place	2010 Kuala Lumpur	Men's team
Bronze medal – third place	2012 Wuhan	Men's team
Asian Championships
Gold medal – first place	2019 Wuhan	Men's doubles
Silver medal – second place	2012 Qingdao	Men's doubles
Bronze medal – third place	2013 Taipei	Men's doubles
Asia Mixed Team Championships
Gold medal – first place	2017 Ho Chi Minh	Mixed team
Asia Team Championships
Silver medal – second place	2016 Hyderabad	Men's team
Bronze medal – third place	2020 Manila	Men's team

Hiroyuki Endo (遠藤 大由, Endō Hiroyuki; born 16 December 1986) is a Japanese former badminton player who specialized in men's doubles. He represented Japan at the 2016 and 2020 Summer Olympics. With Kenichi Hayakawa, Endo won a bronze medal at the 2015 World Championships and was part of the Japanese team that won the 2014 Thomas Cup, the country's first title in the competition.

Endo later partnered Yuta Watanabe, with whom he won the men's doubles title at the 2019 Asian Championships and consecutive All England Open titles in 2020 and 2021. He retired from competitive badminton in March 2022 and subsequently became a coach with the BIPROGY badminton team.

== Career ==
=== 2006–2009: Early career and corporate team ===
While studying at Nippon Sport Science University, Endo won the men's singles title at the 2006 All Japan Intercollegiate Championships. After graduating, he joined the Nihon Unisys badminton team in April 2009.

=== 2010–2016: Partnership with Kenichi Hayakawa ===
He subsequently formed a men's doubles partnership with Kenichi Hayakawa, and the pair won their first BWF Grand Prix title together at the 2010 Australian Open. They retained the Australian Open title in 2011 but were runners-up at Russian Open and the Indonesian Masters. They then won the U.S. Open in 2012. That year, they were also runners-up at the Asian Championships in Qingdao and at the China Masters and the Superseries Finals.

Endo and Hayakawa reached the final of the All England Open three times in succession, in 2013, 2014 and 2016, but lost on each occasion. They were also runners-up at the 2013 China Masters, the 2014 German Open, and the French Open, and won the bronze medal at the 2013 Asian Championships in Taipei.

Endo and Hayakawa also contributed to historic team results for Japan. At the 2014 Thomas Cup, they helped Japan claim its first title in the competition. In the semi-finals, they defeated China's Chai Biao and Hong Wei in straight games as Japan upset five-time defending champions China 3–0 to reach its first Thomas Cup final. In the final against Malaysia, the pair defeated Hoon Thien How and Tan Boon Heong in the first doubles rubber to level the tie at 1–1, and Japan went on to win 3–2. At the 2015 Sudirman Cup, Endo and Hayakawa were part of the Japanese team that reached the final for the first time, securing the country's first medal and its best result in the competition. Later that year, they won the bronze medal at the World Championships in Jakarta after losing a three-game semifinal to Liu Xiaolong and Qiu Zihan.

Endo and Hayakawa represented Japan at the 2016 Summer Olympics in Rio de Janeiro. In the group stage, they recorded their first victory over reigning world champions Mohammad Ahsan and Hendra Setiawan after nine previous defeats, advancing to the quarter-finals. However, a lower-back injury sustained by Hayakawa during training hampered their run, and they were eliminated by eventual bronze medallists Marcus Ellis and Chris Langridge.

=== 2017–2021: Partnership with Yuta Watanabe ===
Following the Rio Olympics and Hayakawa's subsequent retirement, the 30-year-old Endo considered ending his own career. He chose to continue after 19-year-old Yuta Watanabe asked him to form a partnership with the goal of competing at the Tokyo Olympics. The pair began competing together on the international circuit in 2017. In 2018, they won the Korea Open, where Endo claimed his first title after losing his previous nine Superseries and World Tour finals. They were also runners-up at the Malaysia Open and the Thailand Open, on both occasions losing to the Japanese pair Takeshi Kamura and Keigo Sonoda. They were also runners-up at the inaugural BWF World Tour Finals. In 2019, they won the German Open but were runners-up at the New Zealand Open and, for a second consecutive year, at the World Tour Finals. At the World Tour Finals, Endo and Watanabe defeated world No. 1 pair Marcus Fernaldi Gideon and Kevin Sanjaya Sukamuljo twice, first in the group stage and again in the semi-finals. In April of that year, Endo and Watanabe became the first Japanese men's doubles pair to win the Asian Championships, defeating Indonesia's Marcus Fernaldi Gideon and Kevin Sanjaya Sukamuljo 21–18, 21–3 in the final.

In March 2020, Endo won his first All England Open title in his fourth men's doubles final. He and Watanabe became the first Japanese men's doubles pair to win the event, defeating Marcus Fernaldi Gideon and Kevin Sanjaya Sukamuljo in three games for their sixth consecutive victory over the Indonesian pair. At the end of 2020, Endo and Watanabe won the All Japan Championships, giving Endo his sixth men's doubles title at the tournament. He had previously won three consecutive titles with Hayakawa from 2012 to 2014, before adding three titles with Watanabe in 2017, 2019 and 2020. They successfully defended the All England Open title in 2021 against Kamura and Sonoda. At the 2020 Summer Olympics, held in Tokyo in July 2021, the pair reached the quarter-finals before losing to eventual gold medallists Lee Yang and Wang Chi-lin.

=== 2021–2022: Retirement and coaching ===
Endo stepped down from the Japanese national team at the end of September 2021. On 15 February 2022, he played a farewell exhibition match for Nihon Unisys, partnering Watanabe against Hayakawa and Takuto Inoue. He officially retired from competitive badminton on 31 March 2022 and subsequently became a coach with the BIPROGY badminton team.

== Playing style ==
BWF commentators highlighted Endo's combination of attacking power and defensive skill. Morten Frost described his powerful smash and ability to generate power while moving across the rear court. Gillian Clark praised his ability to turn defence into attack through block shots, while Steen Pedersen noted his anticipation and ability to intercept opponents' shots.

In his partnership with Yuta Watanabe, their preferred attacking formation placed Watanabe at the net and Endo in the rear court, as observed by Pedersen. Clark and Frost highlighted the pair's ability to withstand attacking pressure and sustain rallies during flat exchanges. Against the fast-paced attack of Marcus Fernaldi Gideon and Kevin Sanjaya Sukamuljo, Frost observed that longer rallies generally favoured Endo and Watanabe, whose defensive returns forced Gideon to move across the rear court.

== Achievements ==
=== World Championships ===
Men's doubles
Year	Venue	Partner	Opponent	Score	Result	Ref.
2015	Istora Senayan, Jakarta, Indonesia	(Japan) Kenichi Hayakawa	(China) Liu Xiaolong (China) Qiu Zihan	16–21, 23–21, 20–22	Bronze	

=== Asian Championships ===
Men's doubles
Year	Venue	Partner	Opponent	Score	Result	Ref.
2012	Qingdao Sports Centre Conson Stadium, Qingdao, China	(Japan) Kenichi Hayakawa	(South Korea) Kim Gi-jung (South Korea) Kim Sa-rang	12–21, 16–21	Silver	
2013	Taipei Arena, Taipei, Taiwan	(Japan) Kenichi Hayakawa	(South Korea) Kim Gi-jung (South Korea) Kim Sa-rang	21–19, 13–21, 14–21	Bronze	
2019	Wuhan Sports Center Gymnasium, Wuhan, China	(Japan) Yuta Watanabe	(Indonesia) Marcus Fernaldi Gideon (Indonesia) Kevin Sanjaya Sukamuljo	21–18, 21–3	Gold	

=== BWF World Tour (4 titles, 5 runners-up) ===
The BWF World Tour, which was announced on 19 March 2017 and implemented in 2018, is a series of elite badminton tournaments sanctioned by the Badminton World Federation (BWF). The BWF World Tour is divided into levels of World Tour Finals, Super 1000, Super 750, Super 500, Super 300 (part of the HSBC World Tour), and the BWF Tour Super 100.

Men's doubles
Year	Tournament	Level	Partner	Opponent	Score	Result	Ref.
2018	Malaysia Open	Super 750	(Japan) Yuta Watanabe	(Japan) Takeshi Kamura (Japan) Keigo Sonoda	8–21, 10–21	(silver) Runner-up	
2018	Thailand Open	Super 500	(Japan) Yuta Watanabe	(Japan) Takeshi Kamura (Japan) Keigo Sonoda	17–21, 19–21	(silver) Runner-up	
2018	Korea Open	Super 500	(Japan) Yuta Watanabe	(Japan) Takuro Hoki (Japan) Yugo Kobayashi	9–21, 21–15, 21–10	(gold) Winner	
2018	BWF World Tour Finals	World Tour Finals	(Japan) Yuta Watanabe	(China) Li Junhui (China) Liu Yuchen	15–21, 11–21	(silver) Runner-up	
2019	German Open	Super 300	(Japan) Yuta Watanabe	(Japan) Takeshi Kamura (Japan) Keigo Sonoda	15–21, 21–11, 21–12	(gold) Winner	
2019	New Zealand Open	Super 300	(Japan) Yuta Watanabe	(Indonesia) Mohammad Ahsan (Indonesia) Hendra Setiawan	22–20, 15–21, 17–21	(silver) Runner-up	
2019	BWF World Tour Finals	World Tour Finals	(Japan) Yuta Watanabe	(Indonesia) Mohammad Ahsan (Indonesia) Hendra Setiawan	22–24, 19–21	(silver) Runner-up	
2020	All England Open	Super 1000	(Japan) Yuta Watanabe	(Indonesia) Marcus Fernaldi Gideon (Indonesia) Kevin Sanjaya Sukamuljo	21–18, 12–21, 21–19	(gold) Winner	
2021	All England Open	Super 1000	(Japan) Yuta Watanabe	(Japan) Takeshi Kamura (Japan) Keigo Sonoda	21–15, 17–21, 21–11	(gold) Winner	

=== BWF Superseries (7 runners-up) ===
The BWF Superseries, which was launched on 14 December 2006 and implemented in 2007, was a series of elite badminton tournaments, sanctioned by the Badminton World Federation (BWF). BWF Superseries levels were Superseries and Superseries Premier. A season of Superseries consisted of twelve tournaments around the world that had been introduced since 2011. Successful players were invited to the Superseries Finals, which were held at the end of each year.

Men's doubles
Year	Tournament	Partner	Opponent	Score	Result	Ref.
2012	China Masters	(Japan) Kenichi Hayakawa	(China) Chai Biao (China) Zhang Nan	18–21, 17–21	(silver) Runner-up	
2012	World Superseries Finals	(Japan) Kenichi Hayakawa	(Denmark) Mathias Boe (Denmark) Carsten Mogensen	17–21, 19–21	(silver) Runner-up	
2013	All England Open	(Japan) Kenichi Hayakawa	(China) Liu Xiaolong (China) Qiu Zihan	11–21, 9–21	(silver) Runner-up	
2013	China Masters	(Japan) Kenichi Hayakawa	(South Korea) Ko Sung-hyun (South Korea) Lee Yong-dae	23–25, 19–21	(silver) Runner-up	
2014	All England Open	(Japan) Kenichi Hayakawa	(Indonesia) Mohammad Ahsan (Indonesia) Hendra Setiawan	19–21, 19–21	(silver) Runner-up	
2014	French Open	(Japan) Kenichi Hayakawa	(Denmark) Mathias Boe (Denmark) Carsten Mogensen	21–18, 9–21, 7–21	(silver) Runner-up	
2016	All England Open	(Japan) Kenichi Hayakawa	(Russia) Vladimir Ivanov (Russia) Ivan Sozonov	23–21, 18–21, 16–21	(silver) Runner-up	

BWF Super Series Finals tournament
BWF Super Series Premier tournament
BWF Super Series tournament

=== BWF Grand Prix (3 titles, 3 runners-up) ===
The BWF Grand Prix had two levels, the Grand Prix and Grand Prix Gold. It was a series of badminton tournaments sanctioned by the Badminton World Federation (BWF) and played between 2007 and 2017.

Men's doubles
Year	Tournament	Partner	Opponent	Score	Result	Ref.
2010	Australian Open	(Japan) Kenichi Hayakawa	(South Korea) Kang Woo-kyum (South Korea) Park Tae-sang	21–15, 21–16	(gold) Winner	
2011	Australian Open	(Japan) Kenichi Hayakawa	(Japan) Naoki Kawamae (Japan) Shoji Sato	21–17, 21–18	(gold) Winner	
2011	Russian Open	(Japan) Kenichi Hayakawa	(Japan) Naoki Kawamae (Japan) Shoji Sato	18–21, 17–21	(silver) Runner-up	
2011	Indonesia Grand Prix Gold	(Japan) Kenichi Hayakawa	(Indonesia) Mohammad Ahsan (Indonesia) Bona Septano	13–21, 14–21	(silver) Runner-up	
2012	U.S. Open	(Japan) Kenichi Hayakawa	(Japan) Yoshiteru Hirobe (Japan) Kenta Kazuno	21–15, 21–10	(gold) Winner	
2014	German Open	(Japan) Kenichi Hayakawa	(Japan) Takeshi Kamura (Japan) Keigo Sonoda	19–21, 21–14, 14–21	(silver) Runner-up	

BWF Grand Prix Gold tournament
BWF Grand Prix tournament

=== BWF International Challenge/Series (1 runner-up) ===
Men's doubles
Year	Tournament	Partner	Opponent	Score	Result	Ref.
2010	Osaka International	(Japan) Yoshiteru Hirobe	(Japan) Hirokatsu Hashimoto (Japan) Noriyasu Hirata	21–16, 21–23, 17–21	(silver) Runner-up	

BWF International Challenge tournament
