= Eric Go =

American badminton player (born 1984)

Eric Go 吴荣贵
Personal information
- Born: January 12, 1984 (age 42) Manila, Philippines

Sport
- Country: United States
- Sport: Badminton
- Current ranking: 105 (September 20, 2007)
- BWF profile

Eric Go (Chinese: 吴荣贵, born January 12, 1984) is an American male badminton player of Chinese-Filipino descent.

== Early life ==
Go has been the best badminton player for his age in the United States. Since age thirteen he had always kept his name on top of the rankings among the elite juniors in the US. In the 2001 USA Junior Nationals, for under 19 doubles, he and Raju Rai, another USA team member defeated George Liao and Han Wen in the first round and later defeated Isaac Alwine and Adam Scholl in the finals. That year Go also won the singles event for under 19, beating Raymond Wong in the finals.

In the 2000 World Junior Championship Go lost in the first round, but was the best performing American player in the tournament, giving the strong Indonesian player a challenge, while other American players barely scored against weaker European players. In 2006 Go competed in many prestigious tournaments, including Japan Open, China Open, Chinese Taipei Open, Thailand Open, Macau Open, Korea Open, and the US Open. Go performed well in the US Open, making it to the quarter final.

Go attended Palo Alto High School before he moved to Colorado Springs, Colorado, to train at the United States Olympic Training Center. After the training center refused to provide the badminton team the facility, Go moved to Orange County to train at the Orange County Badminton Club. Go enrolled in University of California, Riverside since 2003.

== Major achievements ==
Rank	Event	Date	Venue
World Grand Prix
1	Men's doubles	2002	Perú International
