= Suriname national badminton team =

National team

Suriname
- Association: Surinaamse Badminton Bond (SBB)
- Confederation: BPA (Pan America)
- President: Dion Kappel

BWF ranking
- Current ranking: 96 ▲2 (2 April 2024)
- Highest ranking: 60 (4 July 2013)

Sudirman Cup
- Appearances: 1 (first in 2003)
- Best result: Group stage

Pan Am Mixed Team Championships
- Appearances: 2 (first in 1991)
- Best result: Fourth place (2004)

The Suriname national badminton team (Dutch: Surinaams nationaal badmintonteam) represents Suriname in international badminton team competitions. The national team is organised by Surinaamse Badminton Bond, the governing body for badminton in Suriname.

The first Surinamese national squad was formed in 1970 when a badminton team from Trinidad & Tobago visited Suriname. The Surinamese players of the first national squad in 1970 included players Romeo Caster, Theo Bueno de Mesquita, Artie Heuvel, Frits Terborg, Reginald Ching Jong, Otmar Kersout, Walther Illes and the ladies Lilian Bendter, Maria Ho, Johanna Asin and Cornelly da Silva. The first coach-trainer of the Surinamese badminton squad was Lud Nijman.

The team debuted in the Sudirman Cup in 2003. Suriname also competes in the CACSO Games and the South American Games. The mixed team won bronze in the 2010 South American Games mixed team event in Medellín.

== History ==
=== Men's team ===
In 2012, the team competed in the 2012 Pan American Thomas Cup Preliminaries. Drawn into Group B with Canada, Brazil and Barbados, the team did not advance to the semi-finals after losing 5–0 to Canada and 4–1 to Brazil. The team however beat Barbados 4–1 to achieve third place in the group.

=== Mixed team ===
In 1972, the team competed in the first CAREBACO Team Championships. The team beat Trinidad and Tobago and Guyana but lost against hosts Jamaica to finish in second place. The team continued to finish second behind Jamaica for the next few CAREBACO Team Championships until 1983 when the team won the CAREBACO team title for the first time. In 1990, the team competed in the Central American and Caribbean Games mixed team event but did not make it past the group stages. In 1991, the team made their debut at the Pan American Mixed Team Championships. The team were drawn into Group A with Canada, Jamaica and Trinidad and Tobago. The team lost to Canada and Jamaica but won against Trinidad and Tobago to finish third in the group.

In 1998, the team made their debut in the South American Badminton Championships mixed team event. The team were drawn into Group A with Uruguay and hosts Brazil. The team beat Uruguay 4–0 but lost 3–2 to Brazil. In the third place playoff, the team won 3–2 against Chile for bronze. In 2003, the team made their first ever appearance in the Sudirman Cup. The team were placed into Group 7 with Jamaica, Turkey and the Faroe Islands. The team lost 5–0 to Jamaica and 3–2 to Turkey but defeated the Faroe Islands 3–2 to finish in 49th place on the overall rankings. In 2004, the team finished fourth at the 2004 Pan American Mixed Team Championships. In 2010, the team competed in the 2010 South American Games. The team advanced to the semi-finals after placing second in their group but lost to Peru. The team beat Argentina for third place. In 2011, the team emerged as champions of the CAREBACO Team Championships once again after defeating Barbados 3–2.

In 2018, the team competed in the 2018 South American Games but did not advance to the knockout stage. The team also failed to advance to the knockouts at the 2022 South American Games.

== Competitive record ==
=== Thomas Cup ===
Year	Round	Pos
1949 to 1973	Part of the Netherlands	
1976 to 1994	Did not enter	
1996	Withdrew	
1998	Did not enter	
2000	Did not enter	
2002	Did not enter	
2004	Withdrew	
2006	Did not enter	
2008	Did not enter	
2010	Did not enter	
2012	Did not qualify	
2014	Did not enter	
2016	Did not enter	
2018	Did not enter	
2020	Did not enter	
2022	Did not enter	
2024	Did not enter	
2026	Did not enter	
2028	To be determined	
2030	To be determined	

=== Uber Cup ===
Year	Round	Pos
1957 to 1975	Part of the Netherlands	
1978 to 2026	Did not enter	
2028	To be determined	
2030	To be determined	

=== Sudirman Cup ===
Year	Round	Pos
1989 to 2001	Did not enter	
2003	Group stage	49th
2005	Did not enter	
2007	Did not enter	
2009	Did not enter	
2011	Did not enter	
2013	Did not enter	
2015	Did not enter	
2017	Did not enter	
2019	Did not enter	
2021	Did not enter	
2023	Did not enter	
2025	To be determined	
2027	To be determined	
2029	To be determined	

=== Pan American Team Championships ===
==== Men's team ====
Year	Round	Pos
2016	Did not enter	
2018	Did not enter	
2020	Did not enter	
2022	Did not enter	
2024	Did not enter	
2026	Withdrew	
2028	To be determined	
2030	To be determined	

==== Women's team ====
Year	Round	Pos
2016	Did not enter	
2018	Did not enter	
2020	Did not enter	
2022	Did not enter	
2024	Did not enter	
2026	Did not enter	
2028	To be determined	
2030	To be determined	

==== Mixed team ====
Year	Round	Pos
1977 to 1989	Did not enter	
1991	Group stage	6th
1993	Did not enter	
1997	Did not enter	
2001	Did not enter	
2004	Fourth place	4th
2005	Did not enter	
2007	Did not enter	
2008	Did not enter	
2009	Did not enter	
2010	Did not enter	
2012	Did not enter	
2013	Did not enter	
2014	Did not enter	
2016	Did not enter	
2017	Did not enter	
2019	Did not enter	
2023	Did not enter	
2025	Did not enter	
2027	To be determined	
2029	To be determined	

=== South American Games ===
==== Mixed team ====
Year	Round	Pos
2010	Third place	3rd
2018	Group stage	
2022	Group stage	8th

=== South American Team Championships ===
==== Men's team ====
Year	Round	Pos
1985	Did not enter	
1990	Did not enter	

==== Women's team ====
Year	Round	Pos
1990	Did not enter	

==== Mixed team ====
Year	Round	Pos
1984	Did not enter	
1988	Did not enter	
1996	Did not enter	
1998	Third place	3rd
2012	Did not enter	
2013	Did not enter	
2014	Did not enter	
2015	Did not enter	
2016	Did not enter	
2017	Did not enter	
2018	Did not enter	
2019	Did not enter	
2020	Did not enter	
2022	Did not enter	
2023	Did not enter	

=== Central American and Caribbean Games ===
==== Men's team ====
Year	Round	Pos
2010	Group stage	

==== Women's team ====
Year	Round	Pos
2010	Did not enter	

==== Mixed team ====
Year	Round	Pos
1990	Group stage	
1993	Did not enter	
2006	Did not enter	
2014	Group stage	
2018	Did not enter	
2023	Did not enter	

=== CAREBACO Team Championships ===
==== Mixed team ====
Year	Round	Pos
1972	Runners-up	2nd
1973	Runners-up	2nd
1974	Runners-up	2nd
1975	Runners-up	2nd
1976	Runners-up	2nd
1978	Runners-up	2nd
1979	Runners-up	2nd
1980	Runners-up	2nd
1981	Runners-up	2nd
1982	Runners-up	2nd
1983	Champions	1st
1984	Champions	1st
1985	Champions	1st
1986	Did not enter	
1987	Did not enter	
1990	Did not enter	
1992	Did not enter	
1993	Did not enter	
1995	Did not enter	
1996	Did not enter	
1997	Did not enter	
1998	Did not enter	
1999	Fifth place	5th
2000	Third place	3rd
2001	Third place	3rd
2002	Did not enter	
2003	Third place	3rd
2004	Runners-up	2nd
2005	Third place	3rd
2011	Champions	1st
2012	Runners-up	2nd
2014	Did not enter	
2015	Did not enter	
2016	Runners-up	2nd
2017	Did not enter	
2018	Runners-up	2nd

**Red border color indicates tournament was held on home soil.

== Junior competitive record ==
=== Suhandinata Cup ===
Year	Round	Pos
2000 to 2024	Did not enter	
2025	To be determined	

=== Pan American Junior Team Championships ===
==== Mixed team ====
Year	Round	Pos
1977 to 1988	Did not enter	
1990	Third place	3rd
1991	Did not enter	
1992	Did not enter	
1994	Did not enter	
1996	Did not enter	
1998	Did not enter	
2000	Group stage	5th
2002	Third place	3rd
2004	Did not enter	
2006	Did not enter	
2007	Did not enter	
2008	Group stage	8th
2009	Group stage	9th
2010	Group stage	7th
2011	Did not enter	
2012	Did not enter	
2013	Group stage	10th
2014	Group stage	9th
2015	Did not enter	
2016	Did not enter	
2017	Did not enter	
2018	Did not enter	
2019	Did not enter	
2021	Did not enter	
2022	Did not enter	
2023	Did not enter	
2024	To be determined	

=== South American Junior Team Championships ===
==== Mixed team ====
Year	Round	Pos
1997	Did not enter	
2000	Did not enter	
2001	Did not enter	
2005	Third place	3rd
2009	Did not enter	
2012	Did not enter	
2013	Did not enter	
2014	Did not enter	
2015	Did not enter	
2016	Did not enter	
2017	Did not enter	
2018	Did not enter	
2019	Did not enter	
2020	Did not enter	
2022	Did not enter	
2023	Fourth place	4th

=== CAREBACO Junior Team Championships ===
==== Mixed team ====
Year	Round	Pos
1976	Third place	3rd
1978	Runners-up	2nd
1979	Runners-up	2nd
1980	Third place	3rd
1981	Third place	3rd
1982	Runners-up	2nd
1983	Runners-up	2nd
1984	Champions	1st
1985	Did not enter	
1986	Did not enter	
1987	Fourth place	4th
1988	Runners-up	2nd
1990	Did not enter	
1992	Did not enter	
1993	Did not enter	
1995	Did not enter	
1996	Did not enter	
1997	Runners-up	2nd
1998	Third place	3rd
1999	Champions	1st
2000	Champions	1st
2001	Champions	1st
2002	Champions	1st
2004	Third place	3rd
2005	Fifth place	5th
2007	Champions	1st
2011	Runners-up	2nd
2012	Third place	3rd
2013	Runners-up	2nd
2014	Did not enter	
2015	Did not enter	
2016	Third place	3rd
2017	Fifth place	5th

**Red border color indicates tournament was held on home soil.

== Staff ==
The following list shows the coaching staff for the Suriname national badminton team.

Name	Role
(Suriname) Gilmar Jones	Coach
(Suriname) Redon Coulor	Assistant - Coach
(Suriname) Ewald Abdillah	Technical Director

== Players ==
=== Current squad ===
As of 2 January 2024

==== Men's team ====
Name	DoB/Age	Ranking of event		
Name	DoB/Age	MS	MD	XD
Sören Opti	16 May 1997 (age 29)	234	284	-
Mitchel Wongsodikromo	26 August 1985 (age 40)	729	284	385
Darren van de Leuv	18 November 2000 (age 25)	514	655	1013
Rivano Bisphan	20 January 2005 (age 21)	911	554	454
Danny Chen	20 March 2002 (age 24)	729	554	-
Angelo Chen	29 January 2006 (age 20)	911	655	-
Yu Rui Tony Zhu	30 November 2007 (age 18)	620	655	-
Jair Naipal	1 November 2002 (age 23)	-	774	520
Dylan Darmohoetomo	22 December 1992 (age 33)	911	744	-
Al-Hassan Somedjo	8 January 2005 (age 21)	729	484	-
Diego Dos Ramos	22 July 2005 (age 20)	911	484	-
Quinn van de Leuv	9 October 2005 (age 20)	597	-	-
Dickson Liao	2 November 2007 (age 18)	729	774	643
Eros Pierpont	5 March 2004 (age 22)	-	-	-
Alroy Toney	18 December 1993 (age 32)	-	-	-

==== Women's team ====
Name	DoB/Age	Ranking of event		
Name	DoB/Age	WS	WD	XD
Imani Mangroe	12 November 2001 (age 24)	594	-	1013
Crystal Leefmans	6 January 1995 (age 31)	-	-	633
Sherifa Jameson	23 December 1996 (age 29)	-	-	-
Anjali Paragsingh	24 February 1997 (age 29)	-	-	-
Sion Zeegelaar	11 March 2005 (age 21)	594	-	454
Kayleigh Moenne	7 May 2002 (age 24)	-	-	520
Erisa Bleau	1 February 2003 (age 23)	-	-	-
Chantal Huang	9 March 2006 (age 20)	594	-	520
Chan Chan Yang	11 September 1998 (age 27)	-	-	643
Mary-Ann Zhong	21 August 1999 (age 26)	-	-	-
