= Uruguay national badminton team =

National badminton team representing Uruguay

Uruguay
- Association: Asociación Uruguaya de Bádminton (AUB)
- Confederation: BPA (Pan America)
- President: Jorge Rosales

BWF ranking
- Current ranking: Unranked (2 April 2024)
- Highest ranking: Unranked

The Uruguay national badminton team (Spanish: Selección nacional de bádminton de Uruguay) represents Uruguay in international badminton team competitions. It is controlled by Uruguay Badminton Association (AUB; Asociación Uruguaya de Bádminton), the governing body of badminton in Uruguay.

It is not known when badminton first set foot in Uruguay. In one interview, the interviewee claims that the sport was first played by attachés in embassies, especially in Germany and the sport later spread in popularity and Uruguayans started to get involved in badminton.

In another interview, the interviewee stated that the first president of the Uruguay Badminton Federation, Enrique Collerati bought badminton books, rackets with other equipment including shuttlecocks and began inviting experienced badminton players from Mexico to play badminton in a shed he had around the corner. After that, he had the idea of forming the Uruguay Badminton Federation in 1985.

The national team was formed in 1985. Around that time, the nation began hosting its first national championships and soon competed in the 1985 South American Badminton Championships. In the 2000s, badminton began to fade away in popularity in the country and the Uruguay Badminton Federation was disbanded. In 2016, with the help of Badminton Pan America and the Badminton World Federation, Shuttle Time courses were held and organized as an attempt to revive badminton in Uruguay.

== History ==
=== Men's team ===
Uruguay made their debut in the 1985 South American Badminton Championships men's team event. With only three teams participating, Uruguay finished in third place after losing to Brazil and Argentina. In the 1990 South American Badminton Championships men's team event, the team finished in fourth place after losing 5–0 to Peru and Brazil and 4–1 to Argentina.

=== Women's team ===
In 1990, Uruguay competed in the women's team event at the 1990 South American Badminton Championships in Mairinque, Brazil. The team lost 2–1 to Argentina and 3–0 to Peru and Brazil in the round robin tie.

=== Mixed team ===
In 1988, Uruguay finished in fourth place on home soil in the mixed team event at the 1988 South American Team Championships. In 1996, the team defeated Chile to finish in fourth place in the 1996 South American Badminton Championships. In 1998, the team competed in the 1998 South American Badminton Championships and were drawn into Group A with hosts Brazil and Suriname. In the group stages, the team lost 3–2 to Brazil and 4–0 to Suriname. In the fifth place playoff, the team lost 4–1 to Argentina.

== Competitive record ==
=== Thomas Cup ===
Year	Round	Pos
1949 to 2024	Did not enter	
2026	To be determined	
2028	To be determined	
2030	To be determined	

=== Uber Cup ===
Year	Round	Pos
1957 to 2024	Did not enter	
2026	To be determined	
2028	To be determined	
2030	To be determined	

=== Sudirman Cup ===
Year	Round	Pos
1989 to 2023	Did not enter	
2025	To be determined	
2027	To be determined	
2029	To be determined	

=== Pan American Team Championships ===
==== Men's team ====
Year	Round	Pos
2016 to 2024	Did not enter	
2026	To be determined	
2028	To be determined	
2030	To be determined	

==== Women's team ====
Year	Round	Pos
2016 to 2024	Did not enter	
2026	To be determined	
2028	To be determined	
2030	To be determined	

==== Mixed team ====
Year	Round	Pos
1977 to 2023	Did not enter	
2025	To be determined	
2027	To be determined	
2029	To be determined	

=== South American Games ===
==== Mixed team ====
Year	Round	Pos
2010	Did not enter	
2018	Did not enter	
2022	Did not enter	

=== South American Team Championships ===
==== Men's team ====
Year	Round	Pos
1985	Third place	3rd
1990	Fourth place	4th

==== Women's team ====
Year	Round	Pos
1990	Fourth place	4th

==== Mixed team ====
Year	Round	Pos
1984	Did not enter	
1988	Fourth place	4th
1996	Fourth place	4th
1998	Sixth place	6th
2012	Did not enter	
2013	Did not enter	
2014	Did not enter	
2015	Did not enter	
2016	Did not enter	
2017	Did not enter	
2018	Did not enter	
2019	Did not enter	
2020	Did not enter	
2022	Did not enter	
2023	Did not enter	

**Red border color indicates tournament was held on home soil.

== Junior competitive record ==
=== Suhandinata Cup ===
Year	Round	Pos
2000 to 2024	Did not enter	
2025	To be determined	

=== Pan American Junior Team Championships ===
==== Mixed team ====
Year	Round	Pos
1977 to 2024	Did not enter	
2025	To be determined	

=== South American Junior Team Championships ===
==== Mixed team ====
Year	Round	Pos
1997 to 2023	Did not enter	

**Red border color indicates tournament was held on home soil.

== Staff ==
The following list shows the coaching staff for the national badminton team of Uruguay.

Name	Role
(Uruguay) Luis Pintos	Coach

== Players ==
=== Current squad ===
As of 2 January 2024

==== Men's team ====
Name	DoB/Age	Ranking of event		
Name	DoB/Age	MS	MD	XD
Santiago Tucuna	2003 (age 22–23)	–	–	–
Santiago Brun	2005 (age 20–21)	–	–	–
Marcos Carrasco	2001 (age 24–25)	–	–	–

==== Women's team ====
Name	DoB/Age	Ranking of event		
Name	DoB/Age	WS	WD	XD
Karina Sosa	2000 (age 25–26)	–	–	–
Lara Guillen	2002 (age 23–24)	–	–	–
Yamila Barreto	2003 (age 22–23)	–	–	–

=== Previous squads ===
- South American Team Championships: 1996
