= 2026 BWF World Championships qualification =

Badminton qualification

This is the list of entries for the 2026 BWF World Championships qualification.

== Overview ==
=== Events ===
==== Number of players/member association quota ====
This event's total limit of eligibility players is 416 players, the following charts are the rules and the distribution.

	Men's singles	Women's singles	Men's doubles	Women's doubles	Mixed doubles	Total
Entry limits	64 players	64 players	96 players (48 pairs)	96 players (48 pairs)	96 players (48 pairs)	416 players

Players/pairs ranked on date eligible	Total number of players/pairs from any one Member Association in that event must not exceed
1 to 8	4
9 to 24	3
25 to 150	2

== Participating players ==
=== Men's singles ===
According to the phase 2 updated by BWF, the following table is the invitation results.

Players who ranked from 1 to 8, whose association could nominate 4 players.
Players who ranked from 9 to 24, whose association could nominate 3 players.
Players who ranked from 25 to 150, whose association could nominate 2 players.

Rank	Nation / Player	Points	Eligibility			Note
Qualifiers
1	(China) Shi Yuqi	105,967	1	China	1	Highest ranked Asian
2	(Thailand) Kunlavut Vitidsarn	97,179	2	Thailand	1	
3	(Denmark) Anders Antonsen	93,829	3	Denmark	1	Highest ranked European
4	(France) Christo Popov	84,705	4	France	1	
5	(Indonesia) Jonatan Christie	84,174	5	Indonesia	1	
6	(Chinese Taipei) Chou Tien-chen	81,689	6	Chinese Taipei	1	
7	(China) Li Shifeng	75,128	7	China	2	
8	(Chinese Taipei) Lin Chun-yi	72,838	8	Chinese Taipei	2	
9	(Japan) Kodai Naraoka	69,654	9	Japan	1	
10	(France) Alex Lanier	68,565	10	France	2	
11	(India) Lakshya Sen	67,057	11	India	1	Host nation's presenter
12	(Singapore) Loh Kean Yew	65,980	12	Singapore	1	
13	(Canada) Victor Lai	62,853	13	Canada	1	Highest ranked Pan American
14	(Indonesia) Alwi Farhan	62,200	14	Indonesia	2	
15	(China) Weng Hongyang	58,020	15	China	3	
16	(Japan) Kenta Nishimoto	56,099	16	Japan	2	
17	(France) Toma Junior Popov	55,905	17	France	3	
18	(India) Ayush Shetty	53,806	18	India	2	
19	(Japan) Yushi Tanaka	53,725	19	Japan	3	
21	(Chinese Taipei) Chi Yu-jen	52,497	20	Chinese Taipei	3	
22	(Hong Kong) Lee Cheuk Yiu	49,833	21	Hong Kong	1	
24	(Denmark) Rasmus Gemke	48,614	22	Denmark	2	
25	(Malaysia) Leong Jun Hao	47,491	23	Malaysia	1	
26	(Thailand) Panitchaphon Teeraratsakul	45,996	24	Thailand	2	
28	(Hong Kong) Ng Ka Long	45,039	25	Hong Kong	2	
29	(Republic of Ireland) Nhat Nguyen	45,021	26	Ireland	1	
31	(Singapore) Jason Teh	43,158	27	Singapore	2	
33	(Canada) Brian Yang	42,435	28	Canada	2	
38	(South Korea) Jeon Hyeok-jin	38,269	29	South Korea	1	
44	(Malaysia) Justin Hoh	35,252	30	Malaysia	2	
49	(Belgium) Julien Carraggi	31,959	31	Belgium	1	
52	(Finland) Kalle Koljonen	29,320	32	Finland	1	
54	(Vietnam) Nguyễn Hải Đăng	27,980	33	Vietnam	1	
59	(Croatia) Aria Dinata	27,319	34	Croatia	1	
60	(Finland) Joakim Oldorff	27,274	35	Finland	2	
61	(Israel) Daniil Dubovenko	26,843	36	Israel	1	
62	(England) Harry Huang	26,716	37	England	1	
65	(Brazil) Jonathan Matias	25,687	38	Brazil	1	
66	(South Korea) Yoo Tae-bin	25,109	39	South Korea	2	
71	(United States) Mark Shelley Alcala	24,062	40	United States	1	
74	(Israel) Misha Zilberman	23,417	41	Israel	2	
86	(Germany) Matthias Kicklitz	21,378	42	Germany	1	
88	(Guatemala) Kevin Cordón	20,424	43	Guatemala	1	
93	(Sri Lanka) Viren Nettasinghe	20,270	44	Sri Lanka	1	
99	(United States) Garret Tan	19,719	45	United States	2	
100	(Poland) Dominik Kwinta	19,146	46	Poland	1	
103	(Kazakhstan) Dmitriy Panarin	19,014	47	Kazakhstan	1	
104	(Sri Lanka) Dumindu Abeywickrama	18,960	48	Sri Lanka	2	
105	(Peru) Adriano Viale	18,533	49	Peru	1	
110	(Azerbaijan) Ade Resky Dwicahyo	17,507	50	Azerbaijan	1	
111	(Vietnam) Lê Đức Phát	17,380	51	Vietnam	2	
114	(New Zealand) Edward Lau	17,051	52	New Zealand	1	Highest ranked Oceanian
115	(El Salvador) Uriel Canjura	16,926	53	El Salvador	1	
118	(Italy) Fabio Caponio	15,702	54	Italy	1	
120	(Switzerland) Tobias Künzi	15,615	55	Switzerland	1	
121	(Brazil) Donnians Oliveira	15,350	56	Brazil	2	
122	(Austria) Collins Valentine Filimon	15,239	57	Austria	1	
123	(Italy) Giovanni Toti	15,186	58	Italy	2	
128	(Sweden) Gustav Björkler	14,924	59	Sweden	1	
130	(Azerbaijan) Dicky Dwi Pangestu	14,583	60	Azerbaijan	2	
132	(Poland) Mikołaj Szymanowski	14,491	61	Poland	2	
134	(Philippines) Clarence Villaflor	14,330	62	Philippines	1	
136	(Myanmar) Hein Htut	14,266	63	Myanmar	1	tbc
174	(Egypt) Adham Hatem Elgamal	11,130	64	Egypt	1	Highest ranked African
Reserve
20	(Japan) Koki Watanabe	52,634	1	Japan	4	
23	(China) Lu Guangzu	49,050	2	China	4	
30	(India) Srikanth Kidambi	44,280	3	India	3	
34	(Chinese Taipei) Wang Tzu-wei	41,449	4	Chinese Taipei	4	
35	(India) Prannoy H. S.	41,235	5	India	4	
36	(Chinese Taipei) Lee Chia-hao	40,742	6	Chinese Taipei	5	
37	(Japan) Yudai Okimoto	40,336	7	Japan	5	
39	(Indonesia) Zaki Ubaidillah	37,401	8	Indonesia	3	
40	(Hong Kong) Jason Gunawan	36,590	9	Hong Kong	3	
41	(Denmark) Magnus Johannesen	36,132	10	Denmark	3	
42	(Indonesia) Prahdiska Bagas Shujiwo	35,783	11	Indonesia	4	
43	(India) Tharun Mannepalli	35,596	12	India	5	
45	(Chinese Taipei) Wang Po-wei	34,010	13	Chinese Taipei	6	
46	(Indonesia) Anthony Sinisuka Ginting	33,434	14	Indonesia	5	
47	(Chinese Taipei) Su Li-yang	33,128	15	Chinese Taipei	7	
48	(India) Kiran George	32,490	16	India	6	
50	(Indonesia) Muhamad Yusuf	30,960	17	Indonesia	6	
51	(Malaysia) Aidil Sholeh	29,540	18	Malaysia	3	
53	(Japan) Minoru Koga	28,770	19	Japan	6	
55	(China) Hu Zhean	27,846	20	China	6	
56	(India) Mithun Manjunath	27,770	21	India	7	
57	(Chinese Taipei) Liao Jhuo-fu	27,580	22	Chinese Taipei	8	
58	(Thailand) Kantaphon Wangcharoen	27,450	23	Thailand	3	
63	(Denmark) Ditlev Jæger Holm	26,667	24	Denmark	4	
64	(China) Zhu Xuanchen	25,815	25	China	7	
68	(Chinese Taipei) Ting Yen-chen	24,629	26	Chinese Taipei	9	
69	(Japan) Shogo Ogawa	24,330	27	Japan	7	
70	(Indonesia) Richie Duta Richardo	24,091	28	Indonesia	7	
Decline
27	(China) Wang Zhengxing	45,531	No	China		
32	(France) Arnaud Merklé	43,024	No	France		
67	(China) Dong Tianyao	25,040	No	China		

=== Women's singles ===
According to the phase 2 updated by BWF, the following table is the invitation results.

Players who ranked from 1 to 8, whose association could nominate 4 players.
Players who ranked from 9 to 24, whose association could nominate 3 players.
Players who ranked from 25 to 150, whose association could nominate 2 players.

Rank	Nation / Player	Points	Eligibility			Note
Qualifiers
1	(South Korea) An Se-young	117,270	1	South Korea	1	Highest ranked Asian
2	(China) Wang Zhiyi	106,012	2	China	1	
3	(Japan) Akane Yamaguchi	93,764	3	Japan	1	
4	(China) Chen Yufei	91,035	4	China	2	
5	(China) Han Yue	85,050	5	China	3	
6	(Indonesia) Putri Kusuma Wardani	74,140	6	Indonesia	1	
7	(Thailand) Ratchanok Intanon	69,964	7	Thailand	1	
8	(Thailand) Pornpawee Chochuwong	67,701	8	Thailand	2	
9	(Japan) Tomoka Miyazaki	64,724	9	Japan	2	
10	(Canada) Michelle Li	58,756	10	Canada	1	Highest ranked Pan American
11	(Japan) Nozomi Okuhara	56,490	11	Japan	3	
12	(India) P. V. Sindhu	54,964	12	India	1	Host nation's presenter
13	(Thailand) Supanida Katethong	54,027	13	Thailand	3	
14	(Chinese Taipei) Chiu Pin-chian	53,884	14	Chinese Taipei	1	
15	(Denmark) Mia Blichfeldt	53,326	15	Denmark	1	Highest ranked European
17	(South Korea) Kim Ga-eun	51,811	16	South Korea	2	
18	(Chinese Taipei) Lin Hsiang-ti	51,714	17	Chinese Taipei	2	
19	(South Korea) Sim Yu-jin	51,139	18	South Korea	3	
20	(Denmark) Line Christophersen	50,498	19	Denmark	2	
22	(India) Unnati Hooda	48,840	20	India	2	
23	(Vietnam) Nguyễn Thùy Linh	48,630	21	Vietnam	1	
26	(United States) Beiwen Zhang	46,246	22	United States	1	
29	(Turkey) Neslihan Arın	42,222	23	Turkey	1	
30	(Scotland) Kirsty Gilmour	42,050	24	Scotland	1	
32	(Singapore) Yeo Jia Min	40,413	25	Singapore	1	
33	(Malaysia) Letshanaa Karupathevan	40,394	26	Malaysia	1	
37	(Malaysia) Wong Ling Ching	38,381	27	Malaysia	2	
40	(Ukraine) Polina Buhrova	35,589	28	Ukraine	1	
45	(Canada) Wen Yu Zhang	33,979	29	Canada	2	
48	(Bulgaria) Kaloyana Nalbantova	32,677	30	Bulgaria	1	
52	(Germany) Yvonne Li	31,811	31	Germany	1	
60	(United States) Ishika Jaiswal	28,050	32	United States	2	
61	(Brazil) Juliana Viana Vieira	27,614	33	Brazil	1	
62	(Hong Kong) Lo Sin Yan	27,553	34	Hong Kong	1	
63	(Indonesia) Thalita Ramadhani Wiryawan	27,496	35	Indonesia	3	
77	(Turkey) Özge Bayrak	23,460	36	Turkey	2	
78	(Bulgaria) Stefani Stoeva	23,146	37	Bulgaria	2	
79	(Peru) Inés Castillo	23,050	38	Peru	1	
83	(Spain) Clara Azurmendi	21,664	39	Spain	1	
85	(Azerbaijan) Keisha Fatimah Azzahra	20,925	40	Azerbaijan	1	
87	(Czech Republic) Tereza Švábíková	20,845	41	Czech Republic	1	
91	(France) Anna Tatranova	20,194	42	France	1	
94	(Hungary) Vivien Sándorházi	19,524	43	Hungary	1	
99	(Ukraine) Yevheniia Kantemyr	18,228	44	Ukraine	2	
100	(Germany) Miranda Wilson	17,893	45	Germany	2	
101	(Hong Kong) Liang Ka Wing	17,873	46	Hong Kong	2	
104	(Italy) Yasmine Hamza	17,591	47	Italy	1	
107	(Uganda) Fadilah Mohamed Rafi	17,219	48	Uganda	1	Highest ranked African
109	(New Zealand) Shaunna Li	17,143	49	New Zealand	1	Highest ranked Oceanian
112	(Sri Lanka) Ranithma Liyanage	16,550	50	Sri Lanka	1	
113	(Hungary) Ágnes Körösi	16,425	51	Hungary	2	
114	(United Arab Emirates) Prakriti Bharath	16,400	52	United Arab Emirates	1	
122	(Czech Republic) Petra Maixnerová	15,388	53	Czech Republic	2	
126	(Myanmar) Thet Htar Thuzar	15,137	54	Myanmar	1	
128	(Egypt) Nour Ahmed Youssri	15,048	55	Egypt	1	
130	(Switzerland) Milena Schnider	14,823	56	Switzerland	1	
131	(Singapore) Megan Lee	14,800	57	Singapore	2	
132	(Estonia) Kristin Kuuba	14,515	58	Estonia	1	
136	(Switzerland) Dounia Pelupessy	14,187	59	Switzerland	2	
141	(Republic of Ireland) Sophia Noble	13,985	60	Ireland	1	
142	(Vietnam) Vũ Thị Trang	13,940	61	Vietnam	2	
143	(Philippines) Mikaela De Guzman	13,880	62	Philippines	1	
144	(Peru) Namie Miyahira	13,390	63	Peru	2	
149	(Mexico) Sabrina Solis	13,050	64	Mexico	1	
Reserve
16	(Thailand) Busanan Ongbamrungphan	51,847	1	Thailand	4	
21	(Japan) Riko Gunji	50,369	2	Japan	4	
24	(Thailand) Pitchamon Opatniputh	48,038	3	Thailand	5	
25	(Denmark) Line Kjærsfeldt	47,534	4	Denmark	3	
27	(Japan) Natsuki Nidaira	45,240	5	Japan	5	
28	(Japan) Hina Akechi	42,984	6	Japan	6	
31	(Chinese Taipei) Huang Yu-hsun	41,310	7	Chinese Taipei	3	
34	(India) Tanvi Sharma	40,223	8	India	3	
35	(China) Han Qianxi	39,761	9	China	4	
36	(Chinese Taipei) Sung Shuo-yun	38,805	10	Chinese Taipei	4	
38	(India) Isharani Baruah	36,790	11	India	4	
39	(Japan) Manami Suizu	35,720	12	Japan	7	
41	(Chinese Taipei) Tung Ciou-tong	35,460	13	Chinese Taipei	5	
42	(Denmark) Amalie Schulz	35,145	14	Denmark	4	
43	(India) Devika Sihag	34,680	15	India	5	
46	(India) Rakshitha Ramraj	32,927	16	India	6	
47	(India) Anmol Kharb	32,680	17	India	7	
49	(India) Anupama Upadhyaya	32,419	18	India	8	
51	(India) Malvika Bansod	31,975	19	India	9	
53	(Malaysia) Goh Jin Wei	30,625	20	Malaysia	3	
54	(India) Tanya Hemanth	30,510	21	India	10	
55	(India) Tasnim Mir	30,140	22	India	11	
56	(India) Shriyanshi Valishetty	29,390	23	India	12	
58	(Chinese Taipei) Huang Ching-ping	28,882	24	Chinese Taipei	6	
59	(Chinese Taipei) Pai Yu-po	28,560	25	Chinese Taipei	7	
65	(South Korea) Kim Min-ji	27,251	26	South Korea	4	
66	(South Korea) Park Ga-eun	27,233	27	South Korea	5	
Decline
44	(Chinese Taipei) Hsu Wen-chi	34,655	No	Chinese Taipei		
50	(Denmark) Julie Dawall Jakobsen	32,299	No	Denmark		
57	(Indonesia) Gregoria Mariska Tunjung	29,180	No	Indonesia		
64	(Chinese Taipei) Chen Su-yu	27,480	No	Chinese Taipei		
119	(France) Romane Cloteaux-Foucault	16,147	No	France		
120	(Australia) Tiffany Ho	16,003	No	Australia		

=== Men's doubles ===
According to the phase 2 updated by BWF, the following table is the invitation results.

Players who ranked from 1 to 8, whose association could nominate 4 players.
Players who ranked from 9 to 24, whose association could nominate 3 players.
Players who ranked from 25 to 150, whose association could nominate 2 players.

Rank	Nation / Player	Points	Eligibility			Note
Qualifiers
1	(South Korea) Kim Won-ho (South Korea) Seo Seung-jae	123,905	1	South Korea	1	Highest ranked Asian
2	(Malaysia) Aaron Chia (Malaysia) Soh Wooi Yik	93,150	2	Malaysia	1	
3	(Indonesia) Fajar Alfian (Indonesia) Muhammad Shohibul Fikri	86,150	3	Indonesia	1	
4	(India) Satwiksairaj Rankireddy (India) Chirag Shetty	84,518	4	India	1	Host nation's presenter
5	(China) Liang Weikeng (China) Wang Chang	83,576	5	China	1	
6	(Malaysia) Man Wei Chong (Malaysia) Tee Kai Wun	73,820	6	Malaysia	2	
7	(Malaysia) Goh Sze Fei (Malaysia) Nur Izzuddin	71,230	7	Malaysia	3	
8	(Japan) Takuro Hoki (Japan) Yugo Kobayashi	70,160	8	Japan	1	
9	(Indonesia) Sabar Karyaman Gutama (Indonesia) Muhammad Reza Pahlevi Isfahani	69,880	9	Indonesia	2	
10	(Denmark) Kim Astrup (Denmark) Anders Skaarup Rasmussen	66,681	10	Denmark	1	Highest ranked European
11	(China) Chen Boyang (China) Liu Yi	62,892	11	China	2	
12	(England) Ben Lane (England) Sean Vendy	61,014	12	England	1	
13	(Indonesia) Raymond Indra (Indonesia) Nikolaus Joaquin	61,014	13	Indonesia	3	
14	(Chinese Taipei) Chiu Hsiang-chieh (Chinese Taipei) Wang Chi-lin	60,943	14	Chinese Taipei	1	
15	(South Korea) Kang Min-hyuk (South Korea) Ki Dong-ju	57,113	15	South Korea	2	
16	(Chinese Taipei) Lee Jhe-huei (Chinese Taipei) Yang Po-hsuan	56,636	16	Chinese Taipei	2	
17	(Malaysia) Junaidi Arif (Malaysia) Yap Roy King	54,454	47	Malaysia	2	Promoted From Reserve
18	(Chinese Taipei) Lee Fang-chih (Chinese Taipei) Lee Fang-jen	53,771	17	Chinese Taipei	3	
19	(Denmark) Daniel Lundgaard (Denmark) Mads Vestergaard	51,806	18	Denmark	2	
21	(France) Christo Popov (France) Toma Junior Popov	48,801	19	France	1	
24	(Japan) Kakeru Kumagai (Japan) Hiroki Nishi	46,195	20	Japan	2	
28	(United States) Chen Zhi-yi (United States) Presley Smith	42,115	21	United States	1	Highest ranked Pan American
30	(Japan) Takumi Nomura (Japan) Yuichi Shimogami	40,134	48	Japan	4	Promoted From Reserve
34	(India) Hariharan Amsakarunan (India) Arjun M. R.	39,000	22	India	2	
43	(Singapore) Wesley Koh (Singapore) Junsuke Kubo	33,212	23	Singapore	1	
45	(Canada) Kevin Lee (Canada) Ty Alexander Lindeman	31,798	24	Canada	1	
46	(Czech Republic) Jiří Král (Czech Republic) Ondřej Král	31,693	25	Czech Republic	1	
51	(Scotland) Christopher Grimley (Scotland) Matthew Grimley	30,150	26	Scotland	1	
52	(France) Éloi Adam (France) Léo Rossi	30,054	27	France	2	
55	(Thailand) Chaloempon Charoenkitamorn (Thailand) Worrapol Thongsa-nga	28,807	28	Thailand	1	
58	(Individual Neutral Athletes) Rodion Alimov (Individual Neutral Athletes) Maksim Ogloblin	27,760	29	(Individual Neutral Athletes) Authorised Neutral Athletes	1	
61	(Thailand) Peeratchai Sukphun (Thailand) Pakkapon Teeraratsakul	27,616	301	Thailand	2	
62	(Singapore) Donovan Willard Wee (Singapore) Howin Wong	27,280	31	Singapore	2	
63	(Hong Kong) Hung Kuei Chun (Hong Kong) Lui Chun Wai	27,265	32	Hong Kong	1	
64	(England) Alex Green (England) Zach Russ	27,101	33	England	2	
65	(Germany) Bjarne Geiss (Germany) Jones Ralfy Jansen	27,058	34	Germany	1	
71	(United Arab Emirates) Dev Ayyappan (United Arab Emirates) Dhiren Ayyappan	25,500	35	United Arab Emirates	1	
72	(Scotland) Alexander Dunn (Scotland) Adam Pringle	24,850	36	Scotland	2	
75	(Brazil) Fabrício Farias (Brazil) Davi Silva	24,711	37	Brazil	1	
82	(Germany) Jonathan Dresp (Germany) Simon Krax	21,103	38	Germany	1	
88	(Vietnam) Nguyễn Đình Hoàng (Vietnam) Trần Đình Mạnh	19,720	39	Vietnam	1	
90	(Republic of Ireland) Scott Guildea (Republic of Ireland) Paul Reynolds	19,140	40	Ireland	1	
91	(Canada) Jonathan Lai (Canada) Nyl Yakura	19,096	41	Canada	2	
93	(Spain) Jacobo Fernández (Spain) Alberto Perals	18,172	42	Spain	1	
96	(Switzerland) Yann Orteu (Switzerland) Minh Quang Pham	17,049	43	Switzerland	1	
104	(Sweden) Mio Molin (Sweden) Max Svensson	15,832	44	Sweden	1	
107	(Czech Republic) Vojtěch Havlíček (Czech Republic) Tomáš Švejda	15,620	45	Czech Republic	2	
110	(Philippines) Solomon Padiz Jr. (Philippines) Julius Villabrille	15,070	46	Philippines	1	
Reserve
25	(Malaysia) Nur Mohd Azriyn Ayub (Malaysia) Tan Wee Kiong	45,000	1	Malaysia	4	
26	(Malaysia) Kang Khai Xing (Malaysia) Aaron Tai	44,030	2	Malaysia	5	
29	(Malaysia) Choong Hon Jian (Malaysia) Muhammad Haikal	41,092	3	Malaysia	6	
32	(Indonesia) Muhammad Rian Ardianto (Indonesia) Rahmat Hidayat	40,069	5	Indonesia	4	
33	(China) Hu Keyuan (China) Lin Xiangyi	39,563	6	China	3	
35	(China) Huang Di (China) Liu Yang	38,100	7	China	4	
36	(Chinese Taipei) He Zhi-wei (Chinese Taipei) Huang Jui-hsuan	36,610	8	Chinese Taipei	4	
37	(Indonesia) Ali Faathir Rayhan (Indonesia) Devin Artha Wahyudi	35,990	9	Indonesia	5	
38	(South Korea) Choi Sol-gyu (Malaysia) Goh V Shem	35,340	10	South Korea; Malaysia	3; 7	
39	(Chinese Taipei) Chen Zhi-ray (Chinese Taipei) Lin Yu-chieh	35,246	11	Chinese Taipei	5	
49	(Chinese Taipei) Lai Po-yu (Chinese Taipei) Tsai Fu-cheng	30,350	12	Chinese Taipei	6	
56	(Denmark) Christian Faust Kjær (Denmark) Rasmus Kjær	28,494	13	Denmark	3	
57	(China) Xie Hao-nan (China) Zeng Wei-han	28,300	14	China	5	
59	(Indonesia) Putra Erwiansyah (Indonesia) Daniel Edgar Marvino	27,730	15	Indonesia	6	
66	(England) Oliver Butler (England) Samuel Jones	26,893	16	England	3	
Decline
20	(Japan) Hiroki Midorikawa (Japan) Kyohei Yamashita	51,123	No	Japan		
22	(Indonesia) Leo Rolly Carnando (Indonesia) Bagas Maulana	48,546	No	Indonesia		
23	(Chinese Taipei) Liu Kuang-heng (Chinese Taipei) Yang Po-han	46,250	No	Chinese Taipei		
27	(Thailand) Kittinupong Kedren (Thailand) Dechapol Puavaranukroh	43,512	No	Thailand		
31	(Malaysia) Ong Yew Sin (Malaysia) Teo Ee Yi	40,090	No	Malaysia		
40	(Indonesia) Fajar Alfian (Indonesia) Muhammad Rian Ardianto	35,234	No	Indonesia		
41	(South Korea) Jin Yong (South Korea) Na Sung-seung	34,780	No	South Korea		
42	(Malaysia) Chia Wei Jie (Malaysia) Lwi Sheng Hao	34,240	No	Malaysia		
44	(Chinese Taipei) Chen Cheng-kuan (Chinese Taipei) Lin Bing-wei	32,620	No	Chinese Taipei		
47	(Chinese Taipei) Chang Ko-chi (Chinese Taipei) Po Li-wei	30,810	No	Chinese Taipei		
48	(Chinese Taipei) Su Ching-heng (Chinese Taipei) Wu Guan-xun	30,380	No	Chinese Taipei		
50	(India) Pruthvi Roy (India) Sai Pratheek K.	30,305	No	India		
53	(France) Maël Cattoen (France) Lucas Renoir	29,590	No	France		
54	(Thailand) Pharanyu Kaosamaang (Thailand) Tanadon Punpanich	29,386	No	Thailand		
60	(Japan) Kenya Mitsuhashi (Japan) Hiroki Okamura	27,640	No	Japan		
67	(Denmark) William Kryger Boe (Denmark) Christian Faust Kjær	29,590	No	Denmark		
76	(Germany) Malik Bourakkadi (Germany) Kenneth Neumann	24,490	No	Germany		
85	(Spain) Rubén García (Spain) Carlos Piris	21,103	No	Spain		
111	(New Zealand) Raphael Chris Deloy (New Zealand) Adam Jeffrey	15,010	No	New Zealand		
127	(Algeria) Koceila Mammeri (Algeria) Youcef Sabri Medel	13,059	No	Algeria		Highest ranked African

=== Women's doubles ===
According to the phase 2 updated by BWF, the following table is the invitation results.

Players who ranked from 1 to 8, whose association could nominate 4 players.
Players who ranked from 9 to 24, whose association could nominate 3 players.
Players who ranked from 25 to 150, whose association could nominate 2 players.

Rank	Nation / Player	Points	Eligibility			Note
Qualifiers
1	(China) Liu Shengshu (China) Tan Ning	117,824	1	China	1	Highest ranked Asian
2	(Malaysia) Pearly Tan (Malaysia) Thinaah Muralitharan	96,750	2	Malaysia	1	
3	(South Korea) Baek Ha-na (South Korea) Lee So-hee	92,430	3	South Korea	1	
4	(China) Jia Yifan (China) Zhang Shuxian	89,660	4	China	2	
5	(South Korea) Kim Hye-jeong (South Korea) Kong Hee-yong	87,267	5	South Korea	2	
6	(Japan) Yuki Fukushima (Japan) Mayu Matsumoto	83,870	6	Japan	1	
7	(Japan) Rin Iwanaga (Japan) Kie Nakanishi	80,163	7	Japan	2	
8	(China) Li Yijing (China) Luo Xumin	67,610	8	China	3	
9	(Chinese Taipei) Hsieh Pei-shan (Chinese Taipei) Hung En-tzu	64,342	9	Chinese Taipei	1	
10	(Bulgaria) Gabriela Stoeva (Bulgaria) Stefani Stoeva	57,656	10	Bulgaria	1	Highest ranked European
11	(Chinese Taipei) Hsu Yin-hui (Chinese Taipei) Lin Jhih-yun	55,686	11	Chinese Taipei	2	
13	(Chinese Taipei) Hsu Ya-ching (Chinese Taipei) Sung Yu-hsuan	53,899	12	Chinese Taipei	3	
14	(Japan) Rui Hirokami (Japan) Sayaka Hobara	52,760	13	Japan	3	
15	(Indonesia) Rachel Allessya Rose (Indonesia) Febi Setianingrum	51,394	14	Indonesia	1	
17	(Indonesia) Febriana Dwipuji Kusuma (Indonesia) Meilysa Trias Puspita Sari	50,402	15	Indonesia	2	
18	(Japan) Kaho Osawa (Japan) Mai Tanabe	49,920	47	Japan	4	Promoted From Reserve
19	(Chinese Taipei) Chang Ching-hui (Chinese Taipei) Yang Ching-tun	47,875	48	Chinese Taipei	4	Promoted From Reserve
20	(Hong Kong) Yeung Nga Ting (Hong Kong) Yeung Pui Lam	46,014	16	Hong Kong	1	
22	(Malaysia) Ong Xin Yee (Malaysia) Carmen Ting	45,407	17	Malaysia	2	
23	(United States) Lauren Lam (United States) Allison Lee	44,379	18	United States	1	Highest ranked Pan American
24	(United States) Francesca Corbett (United States) Jennie Gai	42,966	19	United States	2	
25	(Turkey) Bengisu Erçetin (Turkey) Nazlıcan Inci	42,434	20	Turkey	1	
28	(Ukraine) Polina Buhrova (Ukraine) Yevheniia Kantemyr	40,493	21	Ukraine	1	
29	(Hong Kong) Lui Lok Lok (Hong Kong) Tsang Hiu Yan	40,344	22	Hong Kong	2	
30	(India) Treesa Jolly (India) Gayatri Gopichand	38,882	23	India	1	Host nation's presenter
38	(Scotland) Julie MacPherson (Scotland) Ciara Torrance	36,440	24	Scotland	1	
40	(Canada) Jackie Dent (Canada) Crystal Lai	34,346	25	Canada	1	
42	(Thailand) Hathaithip Mijad (Thailand) Napapakorn Tungkasatan	33,534	26	Thailand	1	
46	(India) Kavipriya Selvam (India) Simran Singhi	31,430	27	India	2	
50	(Poland) Paulina Cybulska (Poland) Kornelia Marczak	30,317	28	Poland	1	
54	(Denmark) Kathrine Vang (Denmark) Mette Werge	29,073	29	Denmark	1	
55	(Brazil) Jaqueline Lima (Brazil) Sâmia Lima	28,730	30	Brazil	1	
65	(Denmark) Simona Pilgaard (Denmark) Signe Schulz	24,890	31	Denmark	2	
68	(Spain) Paula López (Spain) Lucía Rodríguez	23,555	32	Spain	1	
71	(Spain) Nikol Carulla (Spain) Carmen María Jiménez	21,919	33	Spain	2	
72	(Netherlands) Kirsten de Wit (Netherlands) Meerte Loos	21,647	34	Netherlands	1	
76	(Thailand) Phattharin Aiamvareesrisakul (Thailand) Sarisa Janpeng	20,634	35	Thailand	2	
82	(Italy) Martina Corsini (Italy) Emma Piccinin	19,212	36	Italy	1	
92	(Sweden) Fiona Hallberg (Sweden) Elin Öhling	15,997	37	Sweden	1	
93	(Switzerland) Aline Mueller (Netherlands) Kelly van Buiten	15,810	38	Switzerland; Netherlands	1; 2	
97	(Turkey) Yasemen Bektaş (Turkey) Sinem Yıldız	15,547	39	Turkey	2	
100	(South Africa) Amy Ackerman (South Africa) Johanita Scholtz	15,201	40	South Africa	1	Highest ranked African
102	(Austria) Serena Au Yeong (Austria) Anna Hagspiel	15,090	41	Austria	1	
103	(Vietnam) Phạm Thị Diệu Ly (Vietnam) Phạm Thị Khánh	14,800	42	Vietnam	1	
110	(Canada) Eyota Kwan (Canada) Johnna Rymes	12,660	43	Canada	2	
111	(Egypt) Nour Ahmed Youssri (Egypt) Doha Hany	12,644	44	Egypt	1	
112	(United Arab Emirates) Taabia Khan (United Arab Emirates) Mysha Omer Khan	12,630	45	United Arab Emirates	1	
131	(Australia) Jazmine Lam (Australia) Yee-yuan Lim	10,580	46	Australia	1	Highest ranked Oceanian
Reserve
26	(Japan) Ririna Hiramoto (Japan) Kokona Ishikawa	42,350	4	Japan	6	
31	(Chinese Taipei) Hu Ling-fang (Chinese Taipei) Jheng Yu-chieh	38,780	5	Chinese Taipei	5	
33	(Indonesia) Isyana Syahira Meida (Indonesia) Rinjani Kwinnara Nastine	37,810	6	Indonesia	3	
36	(Japan) Hinata Suzuki (Japan) Nao Yamakita	37,037	7	Japan	7	
41	(China) Luo Yi (China) Wang Tingge	33,693	8	China	4	
44	(Chinese Taipei) Chen Yan-fei (Chinese Taipei) Sun Liang-ching	31,910	9	Chinese Taipei	6	
45	(Japan) Nanako Hara (Japan) Riko Kiyose	31,490	10	Japan	8	
48	(India) Priya Konjengbam (India) Shruti Mishra	30,846	11	India	3	
52	(Indonesia) Lanny Tria Mayasari (Indonesia) Siti Fadia Silva Ramadhanti	29,909	12	Indonesia	4	
53	(India) Ashwini Bhat (India) Shikha Gautam	29,510	13	India	4	
56	(Hong Kong) Fan Ka Yan (Hong Kong) Yau Mau Ying	28,600	14	Hong Kong	3	
59	(India) Rutaparna Panda (India) Swetaparna Panda	27,070	15	India	5	
64	(Malaysia) Chong Jie Yu (Malaysia) Vanessa Ng	25,170	16	Malaysia	3	
69	(Malaysia) Cheng Su Hui (Malaysia) Tan Zhing Yi	22,500	17	Malaysia	4	
Decline
12	(South Korea) Jeong Na-eun (South Korea) Lee Yeon-woo	55,340	No	South Korea		
16	(Japan) Arisa Igarashi (Japan) Chiharu Shida	50,687	No	Japan		
21	(France) Margot Lambert (France) Camille Pognante	45,683	No	France		
32	(Malaysia) Go Pei Kee (Malaysia) Teoh Mei Xing	38,410	No	Malaysia		
34	(Chinese Taipei) Lin Xiao-min (Chinese Taipei) Wang Yu-qiao	37,380	No	Chinese Taipei		
27	(Indonesia) Febriana Dwipuji Kusuma (Indonesia) Amallia Cahaya Pratiwi	41,344	No	Indonesia		
35	(Indonesia) Amallia Cahaya Pratiwi (Indonesia) Siti Fadia Silva Ramadhanti	37,157	No	Indonesia		
37	(Australia) Gronya Somerville (Australia) Angela Yu	36,519	No	Australia		
39	(Japan) Nami Matsuyama (Japan) Chiharu Shida	35,112	No	Japan		
43	(Chinese Taipei) Sung Shuo-yun (Chinese Taipei) Yu Chien-hui	32,810	No	Chinese Taipei		
47	(Thailand) Ornnicha Jongsathapornparn (Thailand) Sukitta Suwachai	30,910	No	Thailand		
49	(Chinese Taipei) Teng Chun-hsun (Chinese Taipei) Yang Chu-yun	30,820	No	Chinese Taipei		
51	(England) Abbygael Harris (England) Lizzie Tolman	30,267	No	England		
57	(Indonesia) Lanny Tria Mayasari (Indonesia) Amallia Cahaya Pratiwi	28,150	No	Indonesia		
58	(Indonesia) Siti Sarah Azzahra (Indonesia) Az Zahra Ditya Ramadhani	28,060	No	Indonesia		
60	(Denmark) Natasja Anthonisen (Denmark) Amalie Cecilie Kudsk	27,060	No	Denmark		
61	(Chinese Taipei) Lin Chih-chun (Chinese Taipei) Lin Wan-ching	26,170	No	Chinese Taipei		
62	(Chinese Taipei) Chen Su-yu (Chinese Taipei) Hsieh Yi-en	26,020	No	Chinese Taipei		
63	(England) Lisa Curtin (England) Sian Kelly	25,935	No	England		
67	(Sweden) Malena Norrman (Sweden) Tilda Sjöö	23,737	No	Sweden		
66	(Chinese Taipei) Chen Yu-hsuan (Chinese Taipei) Liu Chiao-yun	24,720	No	Chinese Taipei		
70	(Switzerland) Lucie Amiguet (Switzerland) Caroline Racloz	22,401	No	Switzerland		
73	(Indonesia) Apriyani Rahayu (Indonesia) Siti Fadia Silva Ramadhanti	21,340	No	Indonesia		
77	(Germany) Selin Hübsch (Germany) Amelie Lehmann	20,425	No	Germany		
90	(France) Elsa Jacob (France) Flavie Vallet	16,782	No	France		
120	(Peru) Fernanda Munar (Peru) Rafaela Munar	11,469	No	Peru		

=== Mixed doubles ===
According to the phase 2 updated by BWF, the following table is the invitation results.

Players who ranked from 1 to 8, whose association could nominate 4 players.
Players who ranked from 9 to 24, whose association could nominate 3 players.
Players who ranked from 25 to 150, whose association could nominate 2 players.

Rank	Nation / Player	Points	Eligibility			Note
Qualifiers
1	(China) Feng Yanzhe (China) Huang Dongping	107,757	1	China	1	Highest ranked Asian
2	(China) Jiang Zhenbang (China) Wei Yaxin	101,152	2	China	2	
3	(Thailand) Dechapol Puavaranukroh (Thailand) Supissara Paewsampran	96,095	3	Thailand	1	
5	(France) Thom Gicquel (France) Delphine Delrue	81,340	4	France	1	Highest ranked European
6	(China) Guo Xinwa (China) Chen Fanghui	75,250	5	China	3	
7	(Denmark) Mathias Christiansen (Denmark) Alexandra Bøje	74,670	6	Denmark	1	
8	(Hong Kong) Tang Chun Man (Hong Kong) Tse Ying Suet	73,484	7	Hong Kong	1	
10	(Malaysia) Goh Soon Huat (Malaysia) Shevon Jemie Lai	63,898	8	Malaysia	2	
12	(Chinese Taipei) Ye Hong-wei (Chinese Taipei) Nicole Gonzales Chan	63,070	9	Chinese Taipei	1	
13	(China) Cheng Xing (China) Zhang Chi	60,300	45	China	4	Promoted From Reserve
15	(Thailand) Ruttanapak Oupthong (Thailand) Jhenicha Sudjaipraparat	55,780	10	Thailand	2	
16	(Indonesia) Amri Syahnawi (Indonesia) Nita Violina Marwah	53,460	11	Indonesia	2	
17	(Japan) Yuichi Shimogami (Japan) Sayaka Hobara	50,410	12	Japan	2	
20	(Thailand) Pakkapon Teeraratsakul (Thailand) Sapsiree Taerattanachai	47,140	13	Thailand	3	
21	(India) Dhruv Kapila (India) Tanisha Crasto	46,078	14	India	1	Host nation's presenter
22	(Indonesia) Marwan Faza (Indonesia) Aisyah Pranata	45,060	46	Indonesia	4	Promoted From Reserve
23	(United States) Presley Smith (United States) Jennie Gai	44,110	15	United States	1	Highest ranked Pan American
24	(Chinese Taipei) Yang Po-hsuan (Chinese Taipei) Hu Ling-fang	43,840	16	Chinese Taipei	2	
25	(Germany) Marvin Seidel (Germany) Thuc Phuong Nguyen	43,680	17	Germany	1	
30	(Denmark) Rasmus Espersen (Denmark) Amalie Cecilie Kudsk	48,532	18	Denmark	2	tbc
31	(England) Callum Hemming (England) Estelle van Leeuwen	38,455	19	England	1	
32	(Malaysia) Wong Tien Ci (Malaysia) Lim Chiew Sien	37,950	47	Malaysia	3	Promoted From Reserve
33	(Scotland) Alexander Dunn (Scotland) Julie MacPherson	36,860	20	Scotland	1	
35	(Chinese Taipei) Wu Guan-xun (Chinese Taipei) Lee Chia-hsin	36,060	48	Chinese Taipei	3	Promoted From Reserve
38	(France) Julien Maio (France) Léa Palermo	35,580	21	France	2	
39	(Japan) Y Watanabe (Japan) Maya Taguchi	35,300	22	Japan	2	
40	(India) Rohan Kapoor (India) Ruthvika Gadde	35,090	23	India	2	
42	(Spain) Rubén García (Spain) Lucía Rodríguez	34,020	24	Spain	1	
47	(United States) Chen Zhi-yi (United States) Francesca Corbett	28,340	25	United States	2	
49	(Serbia) Mihajlo Tomić (Serbia) Anđela Vitman	27,170	26	Serbia	1	
51	(Brazil) Fabrício Farias (Brazil) Jaqueline Lima	26,300	27	Brazil	1	
52	(Czech Republic) Ondřej Král (Czech Republic) Tereza Švábíková	26,271	28	Czech Republic	1	
56	(Canada) Jonathan Lai (Canada) Crystal Lai	25,539	29	Canada	1	
58	(Brazil) Davi Silva (Brazil) Sânia Lima	24,760	30	Brazil	2	
61	(Germany) Simon Krax (Germany) Amelie Lehmann	24,040	31	Germany	2	
62	(Netherlands) Brian Wassink (Netherlands) Debora Jille	23,960	32	Netherlands	1	
63	(Hong Kong) Chan Yin Chak (Hong Kong) Ng Tsz Yau	23,730	33	Hong Kong	2	
64	(Sweden) Filip Karlborg (Sweden) Tilda Sjöö	23,570	34	Sweden	1	
65	(Canada) Timothy Lock (Canada) Chloe Hoang	23,126	35	Canada	2	
69	(South Korea) Kim Jae-hyeon (South Korea) Jang Ha-jeong	22,490	36	South Korea	1	
72	(England) Samuel Jones (England) Lizzie Tolman	21,070	37	England	2	
74	(Turkey) Emre Sönmez (Turkey) Yasemen Bektaş	20,870	38	Turkey	1	
79	(New Zealand) Edward Lau (New Zealand) Shaunna Li	18,030	39	New Zealand	1	Highest ranked Oceanian
81	(Macau) Leong Iok Chong (Macau) Ng Weng Chi	17,690	40	Macau	1	
100	(Netherlands) Andy Buijk (Netherlands) Meerte Loos	15,360	41	Netherlands	2	
101	(United Arab Emirates) Dhiren Ayyappan (United Arab Emirates) Taabia Khan	15,220	42	United Arab Emirates	1	
102	(Switzerland) Nicolas Franconville (Switzerland) Julie Franconville	15,170	43	Switzerland	1	
105	(Bulgaria) Evgeni Panev (Bulgaria) Gabriela Stoeva	14,910	44	Bulgaria	1	
Reserve
28	(China) Gao Jiaxuan (China) Wu Mengying	43,160	3	China	5	
37	(Indonesia) Rehan Naufal Kusharjanto (Indonesia) Gloria Emanuelle Widjaja	35,740	8	Indonesia	7	
45	(Indonesia) Bimo Prasetyo (Indonesia) Thesya Munggaran	29,680	9	Indonesia	8	
46	(China) Zhu Yijun (China) Li Qian	29,570	10	China	6	
48	(India) Ashith Surya (India) Amrutha Pramuthesh	27,820	11	India	3	
53	(Thailand) Ratchapol Makkasasithorn (Thailand) Nattamon Laisuan	26,060	12	Thailand	4	
54	(Indonesia) Nawaf Khoiriyansyah (Indonesia) Nahya Muhyifa	25,910	13	Indonesia	9	
60	(India) Dhruv Rawat (India) K. Maneesha	24,410	14	India	4	
67	(Thailand) Supak Jomkoh (Thailand) Ornnicha Jongsathapornparn	22,750	15	Thailand	5	
68	(Indonesia) Dejan Ferdinansyah (Indonesia) Siti Fadia Silva Ramadhanti	22,578	16	Indonesia	10	
71	(Chinese Taipei) Wu Hsuan-yi (Chinese Taipei) Yang Chu-yun	22,012	17	Chinese Taipei	4	
73	(Malaysia) Liew Xun (Malaysia) Ho Lo Ee	21,050	18	Malaysia	4	
76	(Japan) Akira Koga (Japan) Natsu Saito	19,780	19	Japan	3	
78	(France) Natan Begga (France) Elsa Jacob	18,310	20	France	3	
82	(India) Mohit Jaglan (India) Lakshita Jaglan	17,690	21	India	5	
Decline
4	(Malaysia) Chen Tang Jie (Malaysia) Toh Ee Wei	91,763	No	Malaysia		
9	(Indonesia) Jafar Hidayatullah (Indonesia) Felisha Pasaribu	66,310	No	Indonesia		
11	(Japan) Hiroki Midorikawa (Japan) Natsu Saito	63,888	No	Japan		
14	(Denmark) Jesper Toft (Denmark) Amalie Magelund	58,716	No	Denmark		
18	(Indonesia) Adnan Maulana (Indonesia) Indah Cahya Sari Jamil	49,320	No	Indonesia		
19	(Denmark) Mads Vestergaard (Denmark) Christine Busch	48,200	No	Denmark		
26	(Malaysia) Jimmy Wong (Malaysia) Lai Pei Jing	43,280	No	Malaysia		
27	(Malaysia) Hoo Pang Ron (Malaysia) Cheng Su Yin	43,180	No	Malaysia		
29	(Chinese Taipei) Chen Cheng-kuan (Chinese Taipei) Hsu Yin-hui	43,001	No	Chinese Taipei		
34	(Indonesia) Dejan Ferdinansyah (Indonesia) Bernadine Wardana	36,690	No	Indonesia		
36	(Indonesia) Bobby Setiabudi (Indonesia) Melati Daeva Oktavianti	35,970	No	Indonesia		
41	(Thailand) Phuwanat Horbanluekit (Thailand) Benyapa Aimsaard	34,240	No	Thailand		
43	(Chinese Taipei) Lu Ming-che (Chinese Taipei) Hung En-tzu	33,460	No	Chinese Taipei		
44	(Chinese Taipei) Liu Kuang-heng (Chinese Taipei) Jheng Yu-chieh	31,430	No	Chinese Taipei		
50	(Singapore) Terry Hee (Singapore) Jin Yujia	27,090	No	Singapore		
55	(South Korea) Lee Jong-min (South Korea) Chae Yoo-jung	25,884	No	South Korea		
57	(Denmark) Kristoffer Kolding (Denmark) Mette Werge	24,990	No	Denmark		
59	(Germany) Malik Bourakkadi (Germany) Leona Michalski	24,498	No	Germany		
70	(Ukraine) Oleksii Titov (Ukraine) Yevheniia Kantemyr	22,480	No	Ukraine		
75	(Japan) Akira Koga (Japan) Yuho Imai	20,540	No	Japan		
77	(Algeria) Koceila Mammeri (Algeria) Tanina Mammeri	18,670	No	Algeria		Highest ranked African
80	(Japan) Hiroki Midorikawa (Japan) Nami Matsuyama	17,750	No	Japan		
