= Chile national badminton team =

National badminton team representing Chile

Chile
- Association: Federación Chilena de Badminton (FCB)
- Confederation: BPA (Pan America)
- President: Helio Alvarez Munoz

BWF ranking
- Current ranking: 89 ▼1 (2 January 2024)
- Highest ranking: 63 (2 July 2015)

Sudirman Cup
- Appearances: 1 (first in 1997)
- Best result: Group stage

Pan Am Mixed Team Championships
- Appearances: 4 (first in 2008)
- Best result: Group stage

The Chile national badminton team (Spanish: Equipo nacional de bádminton de Chile) represents Chile in international badminton team competitions. The Chilean team is managed by the Chile Badminton Federation. Chile competed in the 1997 Sudirman Cup. The team also competed in the Pan American Badminton Championships mixed team event from 2008 to 2016.

The Chilean mixed team also competes in the South American Games. They won bronze at the 2018 South American Games in Cochabamba, Bolivia.

== Competitive record ==
=== Thomas Cup ===
Year	Round	Pos
1949	Did not enter	
1952	Did not enter	
1955	Did not enter	
1958	Did not enter	
1961	Did not enter	
1964	Did not enter	
1967	Did not enter	
1970	Did not enter	
1973	Did not enter	
1976	Did not enter	
1979	Did not enter	
1982	Did not enter	
1984	Did not enter	
1986	Did not enter	
1988	Did not enter	
1990	Did not enter	
1992	Did not enter	
1994	Did not enter	
1996	Did not enter	
1998	Did not enter	
2000	Did not enter	
2002	Did not enter	
2004	Did not enter	
2006	Did not enter	
2008	Did not enter	
2010	Did not enter	
2012	Did not enter	
2014	Did not enter	
2016	Did not enter	
2018	Did not enter	
2020	Did not enter	
2022	Did not enter	
2024	TBD	
2026	TBD	
2028	TBD	
2030	TBD	

=== Uber Cup ===
Year	Round	Pos
1957	Did not enter	
1960	Did not enter	
1963	Did not enter	
1966	Did not enter	
1969	Did not enter	
1972	Did not enter	
1975	Did not enter	
1978	Did not enter	
1981	Did not enter	
1984	Did not enter	
1986	Did not enter	
1988	Did not enter	
1990	Did not enter	
1992	Did not enter	
1994	Did not enter	
1996	Did not enter	
1998	Did not enter	
2000	Did not enter	
2002	Did not enter	
2004	Did not enter	
2006	Did not enter	
2008	Did not enter	
2010	Did not enter	
2012	Did not enter	
2014	Did not enter	
2016	Did not enter	
2018	Did not enter	
2020	Did not enter	
2022	Did not enter	
2024	TBD	
2026	TBD	
2028	TBD	
2030	TBD	

=== Sudirman Cup ===
Year	Round	Pos
1989	Did not enter	
1991	Did not enter	
1993	Did not enter	
1995	Did not enter	
1997	Group stage	59th
1999	Did not enter	
2001	Did not enter	
2003	Did not enter	
2005	Did not enter	
2007	Did not enter	
2009	Did not enter	
2011	Did not enter	
2013	Did not enter	
2015	Did not enter	
2017	Did not enter	
2019	Did not enter	
2021	Did not enter	
2023	Did not enter	
2025	TBD	
2027	TBD	
2029	TBD	

=== Pan American Team Championships ===
==== Men's team ====
Year	Round	Pos
2004	Did not enter	
2006	Did not enter	
2008	Did not enter	
2010	Did not enter	
2012	Did not enter	
2016	Did not enter	
2018	Did not enter	
2020	Did not enter	
2022	Did not enter	
2024	TBD	
2026	TBD	
2028	TBD	
2030	TBD	

==== Women's team ====
Year	Round	Pos
2004	Did not enter	
2006	Did not enter	
2008	Did not enter	
2010	Did not enter	
2012	Did not enter	
2016	Did not enter	
2018	Did not enter	
2020	Did not enter	
2022	Did not enter	
2024	TBD	
2026	TBD	
2028	TBD	
2030	TBD	

==== Mixed team ====
Year	Round	Pos
1977	Did not enter	
1978	Did not enter	
1979	Did not enter	
1980	Did not enter	
1987	Did not enter	
1989	Did not enter	
1991	Did not enter	
1993	Did not enter	
1997	Did not enter	
2001	Did not enter	
2004	Did not enter	
2005	Did not enter	
2007	Did not enter	
2008	Group stage	6th
2009	Group stage	8th
2010	Group stage	6th
2012	Did not enter	
2013	Did not enter	
2014	Did not enter	
2016	Group stage	6th
2017	Did not enter	
2019	Did not enter	
2023	Did not enter	
2025	TBD	
2027	TBD	
2029	TBD	

=== South American Games ===
==== Mixed team ====
Year	Round	Pos
2010	Group stage	
2018	Third place	3rd
2022	Group stage	

=== South American Team Championships ===
==== Mixed team ====
Year	Round	Pos
1984	Did not enter	
1985	Did not enter	
1988	Fifth place	5th
1990	Did not enter	
1996	Fifth place	5th
1998	Did not enter	
2012	Third place	3rd
2013	Runners-up	2nd
2014	Third place	3rd
2015	Runners-up	2nd
2016	Third place	3rd
2017	Runners-up	2nd
2018	Third place	3rd
2019	Fourth place	4th
2020	Did not enter	
2022	Third place	3rd
2023	Fourth place	4th

=== Bolivarian Games ===
==== Mixed team ====
Year	Round	Pos
2009	Did not enter	
2013	Group stage	
2017	Group stage	
2022	Quarter-finals	

**Red border color indicates tournament was held on home soil.

== Junior competitive record ==
=== Suhandinata Cup ===
Year	Round	Pos
2000	Did not enter	
2002	Did not enter	
2004	Did not enter	
2006	Did not enter	
2007	Did not enter	
2008	Did not enter	
2009	Did not enter	
2010	Did not enter	
2011	Did not enter	
2012	Did not enter	
2013	Did not enter	
2014	Did not enter	
2015	Group stage	31st
2016	Did not enter	
2017	Did not enter	
2018	Did not enter	
2019	Did not enter	
2022	Did not enter	
2023	Did not enter	
2024	TBD	

=== Pan American Junior Team Championships ===
==== Mixed team ====
Year	Round	Pos
1977	Did not enter	
1980	Did not enter	
1981	Did not enter	
1988	Did not enter	
1990	Did not enter	
1991	Did not enter	
1992	Did not enter	
1994	Did not enter	
1996	Did not enter	
1998	Did not enter	
2000	Did not enter	
2002	Did not enter	
2004	Did not enter	
2006	Did not enter	
2007	Did not enter	
2008	Did not enter	
2009	Did not enter	
2010	Did not enter	
2011	Did not enter	
2012	Did not enter	
2013	Group stage	8th
2014	Group stage	8th
2015	Did not enter	
2016	Group stage	11th
2017	Group stage	7th
2018	Fourth place	4th
2019	Fifth place	5th
2021	Did not enter	
2022	Did not enter	
2023	Group stage	6th
2024	Did not enter	
2025	Did not enter	
2026	Did not enter	

=== South American Junior Team Championships ===
==== Mixed team ====
Year	Round	Pos
2012	Fourth place	4th
2013	Third place	3rd
2014	Fourth place	4th
2015	Did not enter	
2016	Third place	3rd
2017	Third place	3rd
2018	Fifth place	5th
2019	Fourth place	4th
2020	Did not enter	
2022	Third place	3rd
2023	Third place	3rd

**Red border color indicates tournament was held on home soil.

== Players ==
=== Current squad ===
As of 2 January 2024

==== Men's team ====
Name	DoB/Age	Ranking of event		
Name	DoB/Age	MS	MD	XD
Alonso Medel	19 December 2001 (age 24)	322	217	225
Benjamin Bahamondez	23 June 2004 (age 22)	1096	217	374
Fernando Sanhueza	7 October 2000 (age 25)	439	277	740
Sebastián Vásquez	17 July 2007 (age 19)	474	277	973

==== Women's team ====
Name	DoB/Age	Ranking of event		
Name	DoB/Age	WS	WD	XD
Ashley Montre	8 July 2000 (age 26)	305	225	374
Vania Díaz	23 July 2007 (age 18)	344	225	225
Rosa Quilodrán	12 November 2006 (age 19)	514	419	973
Camila Astorga	15 March 2005 (age 21)	889	314	740
