= 1998 South American Badminton Championships =

Tournament details
- Dates: 21–25 July
- Edition: 6th
- Venue: Clube Fonte São Paulo Gymnasium
- Location: Campinas, Brazil

The 1998 South American Badminton Championships (Portuguese: Campeonato Sul-Americano Adulto de Badminton 1998) was a badminton tournament sanctioned by the South American Badminton Confederation and Badminton Pan America. The individual and mixed team events were held from 21 to 25 July 1998. Six countries took part in the championships.

The Peruvian team finished on top of the medal table, winning gold in all six disciplines while hosts Brazil finished second.

== Medal summary ==
=== Medalists ===
Event	Gold	Silver	Bronze
Men's singles	(Peru) Mario Carulla	(Peru) Guillermo Cox	(Peru) José Iturriaga
Women's singles	(Peru) Lorena Blanco	(Peru) Doriana Rivera	(Peru) Sandra Jimeno
Men's doubles	(Peru) Mario Carulla (Peru) José Iturriaga	(Suriname) Oscar Brandon (Suriname) Derrick Stjeward	(Brazil) Paulo Fam (Brazil) Huang Shuang
Women's doubles	(Peru) Ximena Bellido (Peru) Lorena Blanco	(Peru) Sandra Jimeno (Peru) Doriana Rivera	(Suriname) Nathalie Haynes (Brazil) Cristina Nakano
Mixed doubles	(Peru) Guillermo Cox (Peru) Sandra Jimeno	(Peru) Federico Valdez (Peru) Doriana Rivera	(Peru) José Iturriaga (Peru) Ximena Bellido
Mixed team	Peru; Mario Carulla; Guillermo Cox; José Iturriaga; Federico Valdez; Ximena Bellido; Lorena Blanco; Sandra Jimeno; Doriana Rivera	Brazil; Huang Shuang; Guilherme Kumasaka; Guilherme Pardo; Leandro Santos; Ricardo Trevellin; Cristina Nakano; Hao Min Huai; Sandra Cattaneo Miashiro	Suriname; Oscar Brandon; Derrick Stjeward; Nathalie Haynes

=== Medal table ===
* Host nation (Brazil)

Rank	Nation	Gold	Silver	Bronze	Total
1	Peru	6	4	3	13
2	Brazil*	0	1	1.5	2.5
2	Suriname	0	1	1.5	2.5
Totals (3 entries)		6	6	6	18

== Team event ==
=== Group stage ===
==== Group A ====
Pos	Team	Pld	W	L	MF	MA	MD	GF	GA	GD	PF	PA	PD	Pts	Qualification
1	Brazil (H)	2	2	0	8	2	+6	13	4	+9	210	123	+87	2	Final
2	Suriname	2	1	1	6	4	+2	12	5	+7	217	111	+106	1	3rd–4th place
3	Uruguay	2	0	2	0	10	−10	0	16	−16	31	224	−193	0	5th–6th place

Source: CBBd
(H) Host

Brazil
5
Clube Fonte São Paulo Gymnasium
21 July 1998, 10:00 UTC−2

Uruguay
0

			1	2	3
1	(Brazil) (Uruguay)	Paulo Fam; Mário Torre	15; 6	15; 2
2	(Brazil) (Uruguay)	Mariam Fukuoka; Gianna Stumbo	11; 0	11; 0
3	(Brazil) (Uruguay)	Guilherme Kumasaka / Leandro Santos; Mário Torre / Aldo Collerati	15; 5	15; 4
4	(Brazil) (Uruguay)	Sandra Cattaneo / Hao Min Huai /				w/o
5	(Brazil) (Uruguay)	Guilherme Pardo / Sandra Cattaneo; Aldo Collerati / Gianna Stumbo	15; 1	15; 0

Suriname
4
Clube Fonte São Paulo Gymnasium
21 July 1998, 10:00 UTC−2

Uruguay
0

			1	2	3
1	(Suriname) (Uruguay)	Oscar Brandon; Aldo Collerati	15; 1	15; 2
2	(Suriname) (Uruguay)	Oscar Brandon / Derrick Stjeward; Mário Torre / Aldo Collerati	15; 5	15; 2
3	(Suriname) (Uruguay)	Derrick Stjeward / Nathalie Haynes; Mário Torre / Gianna Stumbo	15; 1	15; 2
4	(Suriname) (Uruguay)	Nathalie Haynes; Gianna Stumbo	11; 0	11; 0
5	(Suriname) (Uruguay)	/ /				not played

Brazil
3
Clube Fonte São Paulo Gymnasium
22 July 1998, 10:00 UTC−2

Suriname
2

			1	2	3
1	(Brazil) (Suriname)	Guilherme Pardo; Oscar Brandon	5; 15	17; 16	3; 15
2	(Brazil) (Suriname)	Cristina Nakano; Nathalie Haynes	11; 8	11; 5
3	(Brazil) (Suriname)	Guilherme Pardo / Ricardo Trevellin; Oscar Brandon / Derrick Stjeward	6; 15	15; 17
4	(Brazil) (Suriname)	Sandra Cattaneo / Hao Min Huai /				w/o
5	(Brazil) (Suriname)	Leandro Santos / Sandra Cattaneo; Derrick Stjeward / Nathalie Haynes	15; 6	15; 8

=== Group B ===
Pos	Team	Pld	W	L	MF	MA	MD	GF	GA	GD	PF	PA	PD	Pts	Qualification
1	Peru	2	2	0	10	0	+10	20	0	+20	224	23	+201	2	Final
2	Chile	2	1	1	3	7	−4	6	14	−8	127	208	−81	1	3rd–4th place
3	Argentina	2	0	2	2	8	−6	4	16	−12	113	233	−120	0	5th–6th place

Source: CBBd

Peru
5
Clube Fonte São Paulo Gymnasium
21 July 1998, 10:00 UTC−2

Chile
0

			1	2	3
1	(Peru) (Chile)	Mario Carulla; Eugenio Romero	15; 1	15; 0
2	(Peru) (Chile)	Lorena Blanco; Pamela Macaya	11; 2	11; 0
3	(Peru) (Chile)	Mario Carulla / José Iturriaga; Eugenio Romero / Oscar Segovia	15; 1	15; 0
4	(Peru) (Chile)	Sandra Jimeno / Doriana Rivera; Pamela Macaya / Natalia Villegas	15; 2	15; 0
5	(Peru) (Chile)	José Iturriaga / Ximena Bellido; Hugo Matus / Carolina Moya	15; 0	15; 0

Argentina
2
Clube Fonte São Paulo Gymnasium
21 July 1998, 10:00 UTC−2

Chile
3

			1	2	3
1	(Argentina) (Chile)	Cecília Garcia; Natalia Villegas	4; 11	1; 11
2	(Argentina) (Chile)	Michael Garay; Eugenio Romero	11; 15	8; 15
3	(Argentina) (Chile)	Alice Garay / Cecília Garcia; Pamela Macaya / Natalia Villegas	3; 15	7; 15
4	(Argentina) (Chile)	Michael Garay / Cristian Meyer; Eugenio Romero / Oscar Segovia	17; 14	15; 9
5	(Argentina) (Chile)	Cristian Meyer / Alice Garay; Hélio Alvarez / Maribel Sobarzo	15; 10	15; 6

Peru
5
Clube Fonte São Paulo Gymnasium
22 July 1998, 10:00 UTC−2

Argentina
0

			1	2	3
1	(Peru) (Argentina)	José Iturriaga; Gaston Harkes	15; 4	15; 4
2	(Peru) (Argentina)	Doriana Rivera; Mariana Gaba	11; 0	11; 1
3	(Peru) (Argentina)	Mario Carulla / José Iturriaga; Michael Garay / Cristian Meyer	15; 0	15; 4
4	(Peru) (Argentina)	Ximena Bellido / Lorena Blanco; Alice Garay / Cecília Garcia	15; 0	15; 0
5	(Peru) (Argentina)	Guillermo Cox / Sandra Jimeno; Gaston Harkes / Cecília Garcia	15; 0	15; 4

=== Classification round ===
==== 3rd to 4th place ====
Suriname
3
Clube Fonte São Paulo Gymnasium
23 July 1998, 10:00 UTC−2

Chile
2

			1	2	3
1	(Suriname) (Chile)	Oscar Brandon; Eugenio Romero	15; 5	15; 3
2	(Suriname) (Chile)	Nathalie Haynes; Natalia Villegas	4; 11	11; 6	10; 12
3	(Suriname) (Chile)	Oscar Brandon / Derrick Stjeward; Eugenio Romero / Oscar Segovia	15; 3	15; 0
4	(Suriname) (Chile)	/ Pamela Macaya / Natalia Villegas				w/o
5	(Suriname) (Chile)	Derrick Stjeward / Nathalie Haynes; Hélio Alvarez / Maribel Sobarzo	15; 6	15; 0

==== 5th to 6th place ====
Argentina
4
Clube Fonte São Paulo Gymnasium
23 July 1998, 10:00 UTC−2

Uruguay
1

			1	2	3
1	(Argentina) (Uruguay)	Michael Garay; Mário Torre	7; 15	7; 15
2	(Argentina) (Uruguay)	Cecília Garcia; Gianna Stumbo	11; 2	11; 2
3	(Argentina) (Uruguay)	Michael Garay / Cristian Meyer; Mário Torre / Aldo Collerati	15; 6	15; 12
4	(Argentina) (Uruguay)	Mariana Gaba / Alice Garay /				w/o
5	(Argentina) (Uruguay)	Cristian Meyer / Alice Garay; Aldo Collerati / Gianna Stumbo	15; 5	15; 5

=== Final ===
Peru
5
Clube Fonte São Paulo Gymnasium
23 July 1998, 10:00 UTC−2

Brazil
0

			1	2	3
1	(Peru) (Brazil)	Mario Carulla; Guilherme Pardo	15; 1	15; 1
2	(Peru) (Brazil)	José Iturriaga / Ximena Bellido; Huang Shuang / Hao Min Huai	15; 5	15; 5
3	(Peru) (Brazil)	Lorena Blanco; Cristina Nakano	11; 7	11; 1
4	(Peru) (Brazil)	Mario Carulla / José Iturriaga; Guilherme Pardo / Leandro Santos	15; 3	15; 4
5	(Peru) (Brazil)	Sandra Jimeno / Doriana Rivera; Hao Min Huai / Cristina Nakano	15; 0	15; 4
