= Argentina national badminton team =

National badminton team representing Argentina

Argentina
- Association: Federación de Bádminton de la República Argentina (FEBARA)
- Confederation: BPA (Pan America)
- President: Hector Maleh

BWF ranking
- Current ranking: 58 ▼5 (2 April 2024)
- Highest ranking: 50 (3 April 2015)

Sudirman Cup
- Appearances: 3 (first in 1995)
- Best result: Group stage

Pan Am Mixed Team Championships
- Appearances: 6 (first in 1997)
- Best result: Group stage

The Argentina national badminton team (Spanish: Selección Argentina de bádminton) represents Argentina in international badminton team competitions and is administered by Argentine Badminton Federation (Spanish: Federación de Bádminton de la República Argentina). Badminton has been played in Argentina since the 20th century in clubs and schools across the nation. The sport was promoted in the 1970s by the Argentine Youth Christian Association but did not garner much attention.

The national team was formed after the formation of the Argentine Badminton Federation (FEBARA) in 1982. The team competed in the first South American Badminton Championships while it was also the host. The team also made their first appearance in the Sudirman Cup in 1995.

The Argentinian mixed team also participated in the Pan American Badminton Championships. Mateo Delmastro is the first Argentinian badminton player to play at the Youth Olympic Games.

== History ==
=== Men's team ===
In 1985, Argentina hosted the second South American Badminton Championships with only men's events being held. The team achieved runners-up position at the men's team event, winning against Uruguay but losing to Brazil. In 1990, the team finished in third place in the men's team event at the South American Badminton Championships.

=== Women's team ===
In 1990, Argentina were bronze medalists at the South American Badminton Championships women's team event. The team won their tie against Uruguay but lost to Brazil and Peru.

=== Mixed team ===
Argentina hosted the first South American Badminton Championships in 1984, the team finished third in the mixed team event. In 1995, Argentina made their debut in the Sudirman Cup. The team were placed in Group 11. The team lost 4–1 to Slovakia, Malta and Brazil but won their tie 5–0 against Morocco to finish 48th in the overall standings. The team then competed for the next two editions of the Sudirman Cup and lost all of their group ties.

The Argentine mixed team then competed in the 2010 South American Games. The team lost the third place tie to Suriname. In 2013, the team made their debut at the Pan Am Mixed Team Championships and finished in 9th place. In 2020, the team finished as runners-up for a third time at the South American Badminton Championships.

== Competitive record ==
=== Thomas Cup ===
Year	Round	Pos
1949 to 1994	Did not enter	
1996	Did not qualify	
1998	Did not qualify	
2000	Did not enter	
2002	Did not enter	
2004	Did not enter	
2006	Did not enter	
2008	Did not enter	
2010	Did not enter	
2012	Did not enter	
2014	Did not enter	
2016	Did not enter	
2018	Did not enter	
2020	Did not enter	
2022	Did not enter	
2024	Did not enter	
2026	To be determined	
2028	To be determined	
2030	To be determined	

=== Uber Cup ===
Year	Round	Pos
1957 to 2024	Did not enter	
2026	To be determined	
2028	To be determined	
2030	To be determined	

=== Sudirman Cup ===
Year	Round	Pos
1989 to 1993	Did not enter	
1995	Group stage	48th
1997	Group stage	54th
1999	Group stage	50th
2001	Did not enter	
2003	Did not enter	
2005	Did not enter	
2007	Did not enter	
2009	Did not enter	
2011	Did not enter	
2013	Did not enter	
2015	Did not enter	
2017	Did not enter	
2019	Did not enter	
2021	Did not enter	
2023	Did not qualify	
2025	To be determined	
2027	To be determined	
2029	To be determined	

=== Pan American Team Championships ===
==== Men's team ====
Year	Round	Pos
2016 to 2024	Did not enter	
2026	To be determined	
2028	To be determined	
2030	To be determined	

==== Women's team ====
Year	Round	Pos
2016 to 2024	Did not enter	
2026	To be determined	
2028	To be determined	
2030	To be determined	

==== Mixed team ====
Year	Round	Pos
1977	Did not enter	
1978	Did not enter	
1979	Did not enter	
1980	Did not enter	
1987	Did not enter	
1989	Did not enter	
1991	Did not enter	
1993	Did not enter	
1997	Group stage	9th
2001	Group stage	6th
2004	Did not enter	
2005	Did not enter	
2007	Did not enter	
2008	Did not enter	
2009	Did not enter	
2010	Did not enter	
2012	Did not enter	
2013	Group stage	9th
2014	Group stage	8th
2016	Did not enter	
2017	Did not enter	
2019	Group stage	11th
2023	Group stage	8th
2025	To be determined	
2027	To be determined	
2029	To be determined	

=== South American Games ===
==== Mixed team ====
Year	Round	Pos
2010	Fourth place	4th
2018	Group stage	5th
2022	Group stage	5th

=== South American Team Championships ===
==== Men's team ====
Year	Round	Pos
1985	Runners-up	2nd
1990	Third place	3rd

==== Women's team ====
Year	Round	Pos
1990	Third place	3rd

==== Mixed team ====
Year	Round	Pos
1984	Runners-up	2nd
1988	Third place	3rd
1996	Third place	3rd
1998	Fifth place	5th
2012	Did not enter	
2013	Third place	3rd
2014	Did not enter	
2015	Did not enter	
2016	Fourth place	4th
2017	Fourth place	4th
2018	Fourth place	4th
2019	Third place	3rd
2020	Runners-up	2nd
2022	Did not enter	
2023	Did not enter	
2024	Fourth place	4th

**Red border color indicates tournament was held on home soil.

== Junior competitive record ==
=== Suhandinata Cup ===
Year	Round	Pos
2000 to 2025	Did not enter	
2025	To be determined	

=== Pan American Junior Team Championships ===
==== Mixed team ====
Year	Round	Pos
1977 to 1996	Did not enter	
1998	Group stage	7th
2000	Group stage	8th
2002	Did not enter	
2004	Did not enter	
2006	Did not enter	
2007	Did not enter	
2008	Did not enter	
2009	Did not enter	
2010	Did not enter	
2011	Did not enter	
2012	Group stage	8th
2013	Group stage	12th
2014	Group stage	11th
2015	Group stage	10th
2016	Did not enter	
2017	Did not enter	
2018	Did not enter	
2019	Did not enter	
2021	Did not enter	
2022	Did not enter	
2023	Did not enter	
2024	Did not enter	
2025	To be determined	

=== South American Junior Team Championships ===
==== Mixed team ====
Year	Round	Pos
1997	Fourth place	4th
2000	Fourth place	4th
2001	Fourth place	4th
2005	Did not enter	
2009	Did not enter	
2012	Group stage	6th
2013	Fourth place	4th
2014	Did not enter	
2015	Did not enter	
2016	Fifth place	5th
2017	Fifth place	5th
2018	Runners-up	2nd
2019	Third place	3rd
2020	Runners-up	2nd
2022	Did not enter	
2023	Group stage	6th
2024	Fourth place	4th

**Red border color indicates tournament was held on home soil.

== Staff ==
The following list shows the coaching staff for the national badminton team of Argentina.

Name	Role
(Argentina) Martín Trejo	Head coach
(Argentina) Gaston Harkes	Assistant coach

== Players ==
=== Current squad ===
As of 2 January 2024

==== Men's team ====
Name	DoB/Age	Ranking of event		
Name	DoB/Age	MS	MD	XD
Andrés Vázquez	19 March 2001 (age 25)	–	–	–
Mateo Delmastro	14 April 2000 (age 26)	–	–	–
Dino Delmastro	21 February 1996 (age 30)	–	–	–
Angel Bertolez	10 March 1998 (age 28)	–	–	–
Nicolas Oliva	11 October 2002 (age 24)	322	162	216
Santiago Otero	24 May 2001 (age 25)	230	162	140

==== Women's team ====
Name	DoB/Age	Ranking of event		
Name	DoB/Age	WS	WD	XD
Ailen Oliva	7 January 2005 (age 21)	349	200	216
Iona Gualdi	24 March 2005 (age 21)	206	200	140
Lara Gallardo	16 September 2003 (age 23)	–	–	–
Marilyn Romero	10 December 2002 (age 23)	–	–	–
Micaela Suárez	28 January 2000 (age 26)	–	–	–
Florencia Bernatene	31 December 1998 (age 27)	–	–	–

=== Previous squads ===
==== Pan American Badminton Championships ====
- Mixed team: 2013, 2014, 2019
