= 1996 South American Badminton Championships =

Tournament details
- Dates: 14–17 November
- Edition: 5th
- Venue: Coliseo del Parque Sarmiento
- Location: Buenos Aires, Argentina

The 1996 South American Badminton Championships (Spanish: Campeonato Sudamericano Adulto de Badminton 1996) was a badminton tournament sanctioned by the South American Badminton Confederation and Badminton Pan America. The individual and mixed team events were held from 14 to 17 November 1996.

The tournament was held at CENARD located in Buenos Aires, Argentina. Peru finished top on the medal table, winning gold in every event.

In the mixed team event, Peru achieved first place after winning against their opponents 5–0.

== Medal summary ==
=== Medalists ===
Event	Gold	Silver	Bronze
Men's singles	(Peru) Mario Carulla	(Brazil) Leandro Santos	(Brazil) Paulo Fam
Men's singles	(Peru) Mario Carulla	(Brazil) Leandro Santos	(Brazil) Euclides Freitas
Women's singles	(Peru) Lorena Blanco	(Peru) Ximena Bellido	(Peru) Lucero Chueca
Women's singles	(Peru) Lorena Blanco	(Peru) Ximena Bellido	(Peru) Doriana Rivera
Men's doubles	(Peru) Mario Carulla (Peru) Gustavo Salazar	(Peru) Gonzalo Castillo (Peru) Federico Valdez	(Brazil) Marcelo Martins (Brazil) Leandro Santos
Men's doubles	(Peru) Mario Carulla (Peru) Gustavo Salazar	(Peru) Gonzalo Castillo (Peru) Federico Valdez	(Brazil) Paulo Fam (Brazil) Huang Shuang
Women's doubles	(Peru) Ximena Bellido (Peru) Lorena Blanco	(Peru) Lucero Chueca (Peru) Doriana Rivera	(Argentina) Alice Garay (Argentina) Andrea Somrau
Women's doubles	(Peru) Ximena Bellido (Peru) Lorena Blanco	(Peru) Lucero Chueca (Peru) Doriana Rivera	(Brazil) Patricia Finardi (Brazil) Cristina Nakano
Mixed doubles	(Peru) Gustavo Salazar (Peru) Lorena Blanco	(Peru) Mario Carulla (Peru) Ximena Bellido	(Peru) Federico Valdez (Peru) Doriana Rivera
Mixed doubles	(Peru) Gustavo Salazar (Peru) Lorena Blanco	(Peru) Mario Carulla (Peru) Ximena Bellido	(Peru) Gonzalo Castillo (Peru) Lucero Chueca
Mixed team	Peru; Mario Carulla; Gonzalo Castillo; Gustavo Salazar; Federico Valdez; Ximena Bellido; Lorena Blanco; Lucero Chueca; Doriana Rivera	Brazil; Fabian Cattaneo; Paulo Fam; Euclides Freitas; Huang Shuang; Marcelo Martins; Alexandre Natucci; Leandro Santos; Patricia Finardi; Hao Min Huai; Cristina Nakano; Sandra Cattaneo	Argentina; Michael Garay; Gaston Harkes; Jaroslaw Klysz; Jorge Meyer; Cristian Meyer; Rene Somrau; Celica Christensen; Alice Garay; Andrea Somrau; Rosa Tito

=== Medal table ===
* Host nation (Argentina)

Rank	Nation	Gold	Silver	Bronze	Total
1	Peru	6	4	4	14
2	Brazil	0	2	5	7
3	Argentina*	0	0	2	2
Totals (3 entries)		6	6	11	23

== Team event ==
=== Round robin ===
Team	Pld	W	L	MF	MA	MD	Pts	Qualification
Peru	4	4	0	20	0	+20	4	Champions
Brazil	4	3	1	15	5	+10	3	Runners-up
Argentina	4	2	2	8	12	−4	2	Third place
Uruguay	4	1	3	6	14	−8	1	Fourth place
Chile	4	0	4	1	19	−18	0	Fifth place

Peru	5–0	Brazil
Peru	5–0	Argentina
Peru	5–0	Uruguay
Peru	5–0	Chile
Brazil	5–0	Argentina
Brazil	5–0	Uruguay
Brazil	5–0	Chile
Argentina	3–2	Uruguay
Argentina	5–0	Chile
Uruguay	4–1	Chile
