= Doriana Rivera =

Peruvian-New Zealand badminton player

Doriana Rivera Aliaga
Personal information
- Born: 18 June 1977 (age 49)

Sport
- Country: New Zealand
- Sport: Badminton
- Event: Doubles

Doubles
- BWF profile
Medal record
Women's badminton
Representing Peru
Pan American Games
Bronze medal – third place	2003 Santo Domingo	Women's doubles
Bronze medal – third place	1999 Winnipeg	Women's doubles
Pan American Championships
Silver medal – second place	2004 Lima	Mixed team
Bronze medal – third place	1997 Winnipeg	Women's doubles
Bronze medal – third place	1997 Winnipeg	Mixed team
South American Championships
Gold medal – first place	1996 Buenos Aires	Mixed team
Gold medal – first place	1998 Campinas	Mixed team
Silver medal – second place	1998 Campinas	Women's singles
Silver medal – second place	1996 Buenos Aires	Women's doubles
Silver medal – second place	1998 Campinas	Women's doubles
Silver medal – second place	1998 Campinas	Mixed doubles
Bronze medal – third place	1996 Buenos Aires	Women's singles
Bronze medal – third place	1996 Buenos Aires	Mixed doubles

Doriana Rivera Aliaga (born 18 June 1977) is a retired Peruvian badminton player who later represented New Zealand in her career. She is the two time bronze medalist at the Pan American Games in Women's doubles category. Besides this, she has also represented her country in World Championships.

Doriana Rivera completed her Bachelor in Medicine in the year 2004 after which she moved to New Zealand to start her career. She worked in a hospital for 3 years where she gained experience in various aspects of medicine. Dr. Rivera started her journey as a General Practitioner in 2012, and was granted Fellowship of the Royal New Zealand College of General Practitioners in 2015. She was appointed as the Deputy Medical Director for a busy GP and Urgent Care clinic where she worked for 7 years.

== Achievements ==
=== Pan American Games ===
Women's doubles
Year	Venue	Partner	Opponent	Score	Result
2003	UASD Pavilion; Santo Domingo, Dominican Republic	(Peru) Sandra Jimeno	(Canada) Anna Rice (Canada) Denyse Julien	8–15, 6–15	Bronze
1999	Winnipeg Convention Center; Manitoba, Canada	(Peru) Adrienn Kocsis	(Canada) Milaine Cloutier (Canada) Robbyn Hermitage	8–15, 4–15	Bronze

=== Pan American Championships ===
Women's doubles
Year	Venue	Partner	Opponent	Score	Result
1997	Winnipeg Canoe Club, Canada	(Peru) Sandra Jimeno	(Canada) Milaine Cloutier (Canada) Robbyn Hermitage	1–15, 5–15	Bronze

=== South American Championships ===
Women's singles
Year	Venue	Opponent	Score	Result
1996	Coliseo del Parque Sarmiento; Buenos Aires, Argentina	(Peru) Ximena Bellido	4–11, 9–11	Bronze
1998	Clube Fonte São Paulo Gymnasium; Campinas, Brazil	(Peru) Lorena Blanco		Silver

Women's doubles
Year	Venue	Partner	Opponent	Score	Result
1996	Coliseo del Parque Sarmiento; Buenos Aires, Argentina	(Peru) Lucero Chueca	(Peru) Lorena Blanco (Peru) Ximena Bellido	8–15, 9–15	Silver
1998	Clube Fonte São Paulo Gymnasium; Campinas, Brazil	(Peru) Sandra Jimeno	(Peru) Lorena Blanco (Peru) Ximena Bellido		Silver

Mixed doubles
Year	Venue	Partner	Opponent	Score	Result
1996	Coliseo del Parque Sarmiento; Buenos Aires, Argentina	(Peru) Federico Valdez	(Peru) Gustavo Salazar (Peru) Lorena Blanco	8–15, 3–15	Bronze
1998	Clube Fonte São Paulo Gymnasium; Campinas, Brazil	(Peru) Federico Valdez	(Peru) Guillermo Cox (Peru) Sandra Jimeno		Silver

=== IBF/BWF International ===
Women's singles
Year	Tournament	Opponent	Score	Result
2002	Carebaco International	(Peru) Sandra Jimeno	0–7, 1–7, 2–7	(silver) Runner-up
2000	Brazil International	(Peru) Ximena Bellido	3–11, 0–11	(silver) Runner-up
1996	São Paulo Cup	(Peru) Ximena Bellido	6–11, 2–11	(silver) Runner-up

Women's doubles
Year	Tournament	Partner	Opponent	Score	Result
2011	Manukau International	(New Zealand) Madeleine Stapleton	(New Zealand) Emma Chapple (New Zealand) Louise Mckenzie	21–17, 12–21, 21–18	(gold) Winner
2003	Peru International	(Peru) Sandra Jimeno	(Switzerland) Fabienne Baumeyer (Switzerland) Judith Baumeyer	8–15, 15–12, 11–15	(silver) Runner-up
2002	Mexico International	(Peru) Sandra Jimeno	(Wales) Felicity Gallup (Wales) Joanne Muggeridge	2–11, 8–11	(silver) Runner-up
2002	Brazil International	(Peru) Sandra Jimeno	(Peru) Lorena Blanco (Peru) Valeria Rivero	11–3, 11–3	(gold) Winner
2002	Carebaco International	(Peru) Sandra Jimeno	(Trinidad and Tobago) Zuedi Mack (Trinidad and Tobago) Sabrina Cassie	7–4, 7–2, 7–0	(gold) Winner
2001	USA International	(Peru) Sandra Jimeno	(United States) Meiluawati (United States) Mesinee Mangkalakiri	7–0, 3–7, 5–7, ?, ?	(silver) Runner-up
2001	Chile International	(Peru) Sandra Jimeno	(Wales) Felicity Gallup (Wales) Joanne Muggeridge	5–7, 5–7, 2–7	(silver) Runner-up
2001	Peru International	(Peru) Sandra Jimeno	(Wales) Felicity Gallup (Wales) Joanne Muggeridge	2–7, 2–7, 1–7	(silver) Runner-up
2000	Brazil International	(Peru) Ximena Bellido	(Mexico) Gabriella Rodriguez (Mexico) Laura Amaya	15–5, 15–4	(gold) Winner
1999	Argentina International	(Peru) Sandra Jimeno	(Peru) Lorena Blanco (Peru) Ximena Bellido	11–15, 15–8, 15–4	(gold) Winner
1999	USA International	(Peru) Sandra Jimeno	(Peru) Lorena Blanco (Peru) Ximena Bellido	7–15, 15–9, 3–15	(silver) Runner-up
1998	Argentina International	(Peru) Adrienn Kocsis	(Peru) Lorena Blanco (Peru) Ximena Bellido	10–15, 0–15	(silver) Runner-up
1996	São Paulo Cup	(Peru) Ximena Bellido	(Brazil) Cristina Nakano (Brazil) Patricia Finardi	15–2, 15–10	(gold) Winner

Mixed doubles
Year	Tournament	Partner	Opponent	Score	Result
2006	Waikato International	(Spain) José Antonio Crespo	(New Zealand) Craig Cooper (New Zealand) Renee Flavell	17–21, 18–21	(silver) Runner-up
2002	Mexico International	(Netherlands) Tjitte Weistra	(Wales) Matthew Hughes (Wales) Joanne Muggeridge	6–11, 13–11, 11–8	(gold) Winner
2002	Puerto Rico International	(Netherlands) Tjitte Weistra	(Indonesia) Tony Gunawan (United States) Mesinee Mangkalakiri	2–11, 3–11	(silver) Runner-up
2002	Carebaco International	(Netherlands) Tjitte Weistra	(Guatemala) Pedro Yang (Guatemala) Anelissa Micheo	7–2, 2–7, 7–3, ?, ?	(gold) Winner
2002	Peru International	(Netherlands) Tjitte Weistra	(Peru) Rodrigo Pacheco (Peru) Lorena Blanco	7–2, 8–7, 7–2	(gold) Winner
2001	Chile International	(Netherlands) Tjitte Weistra	(Peru) Jose Antonio Iturriaga (Peru) Ximena Bellido	8–6, 7–0, 7–2	(gold) Winner
2001	Peru International	(Netherlands) Tjitte Weistra	(Peru) Jose Antonio Iturriaga (Peru) Ximena Bellido	7–4, 7–4, 8–6	(gold) Winner
2000	Brazil International	(Netherlands) Tjitte Weistra	(Mexico) Bernardo Monreal (Mexico) Laura Amaya	15–9, 15–6	(gold) Winner
1996	São Paulo Cup	(Peru) Federico Valdez	(Peru) Mario Carulla (Peru) Ximena Bellido	Walkover	(silver) Runner-up
