= Brazil national badminton team =

National badminton team representing Brazil

Brazil
- Association: Confederação Brasileira de Badminton (CBBd)
- Confederation: BPA (Pan America)
- President: José Santini

BWF ranking
- Current ranking: 18 ▼1 (2 April 2024)
- Highest ranking: 17 (2 January 2024)

Sudirman Cup
- Appearances: 4 (first in 1997)
- Best result: Group stage

Pan Am Mixed Team Championships
- Appearances: 17 (first in 1987)
- Best result: Runners-up (2016, 2018)

Pan Am Men's Team Championships
- Appearances: 3 (first in 2020)
- Best result: Runners-up (2022, 2024)

Pan Am Women's Team Championships
- Appearances: 3 (first in 2020)
- Best result: Third place (2020, 2022, 2024)

The Brazil national badminton team (Portuguese: Seleção Brasileira de badminton) represents Brazil in international badminton team competitions. It is controlled by the Brazil Badminton Confederation (CBBd; Confederação Brasileira de Badminton), the governing body for badminton in Brazil. Brazil is one of South America's most active badminton nations. The team is a member of Badminton Pan America and the South American Badminton Confederation.

The team was formed in the early 1980s. The team made their first appearance at the Sudirman Cup in 1997. The team have also finished as runners-up at the Pan American Mixed Team Badminton Championships in 2016 and 2017. The team have yet to qualify for the Thomas Cup and the Uber Cup.

The team also competes in the South American Badminton Championships and have won the mixed team title in 2012, 2014, 2015, 2016 and 2023. The team also won the men's team title at the South American championships in 1985. The team also won gold in the South American Games mixed team event in 2018 and 2022.

== History ==
=== Men's team ===
In 1985, Brazil competed in the 1985 South American Badminton Championships men's team event. The team defeated hosts Argentina and Uruguay to win gold in the event. In 1990, the team were runners-up at the 1990 South American Badminton Championships.

From 1996 to 2002, the team took part in qualifying for the Thomas Cup but could not get past the group stages. In 2004, the team were semi-finalists at the 2004 Pan American Thomas Cup Preliminaries.

In 2022, the team entered the finals of the 2022 Pan Am Male Badminton Cup after upsetting the United States 3–0 in the semi-finals. In the final, the team took a 2–1 lead against Canada but ended up winning silver after losing 3–2 to the favorites. In 2024, the team won silver for a second time at the 2024 Pan Am Male Badminton Cup after losing 3–0 to Canada.

=== Women's team ===
In 1990, Brazil won silver in the women's team event at the 1990 South American Badminton Championships after losing to Peru. In 2006, the team competed in the 2006 Pan American Uber Cup Preliminaries and were eliminated in the group stages. In 2008, the team finished fourth at the 2008 Pan American Uber Cup Preliminaries. The team also finished third in the 2012 Pan American Uber Cup Preliminaries.

In 2020, the team were bronze medalists at the 2020 Pan Am Badminton Championships women's team event. The team also won bronze at the Pan Am Female Badminton Cup in 2022 and 2024.

=== Mixed team ===
The team first competed in the 1984 South American Badminton Championships in Buenos Aires. The team finished in third place after losing to Peru and Argentina. In 1987, the team made their first appearance at the Pan American Mixed Team Championships. Drawn to Group B with Peru, Jamaica and Guatemala, the team finished on the bottom of their group after losing to all of their opponents. In 1993, the team finished fourth in the Pan American Mixed Team Championships. In 1997, the team debuted in the Sudirman Cup; the World Mixed Team Championships. Drawn to Group 7B with Italy, Slovakia and Argentina, the team finished third in the group. The team then defeated Malta in the playoffs for 51st place.

In 2009, the team placed fourth in the 2009 Pan American Mixed Team Championships. In 2010, the team were runners-up at the 2010 South American Games, losing 3–1 to Peru in the final. In 2012, Brazil won the South American Mixed Team Championships for the first time since their debut in 1984, defeating rivals Peru and Chile. In 2016, the team reached the final of the Pan American Mixed Team Championships for the first time. In the final, the team lost 3–2 to Canada. A year later, the team lost to Canada 3–0 in the Pan American Mixed Team Championships final. In 2018, Brazil won their first ever gold medal in the mixed team event at the South American Games.

In 2022, the team won the gold medal at the South American Games for a second time. In 2023, the team were semi-finalists at the Pan American Badminton Championships.

== Competitive record ==
=== Thomas Cup ===
Year	Round	Pos
1949 to 1994	Did not enter	
1996	Did not qualify	
1998	Did not qualify	
2000	Did not qualify	
2002	Did not qualify	
2004	Did not qualify	
2006	Did not qualify	
2008	Did not qualify	
2010	Did not qualify	
2012	Did not qualify	
2014	Did not enter	
2016	Did not enter	
2018	Did not enter	
2020	Did not qualify	
2022	Did not qualify	
2024	Did not qualify	
2026	Did not qualify	
2028	To be determined	
2030	To be determined	

=== Uber Cup ===
Year	Round	Pos
1957 to 2004	Did not enter	
2006	Did not qualify	
2008	Did not qualify	
2010	Did not qualify	
2012	Did not qualify	
2014	Did not enter	
2016	Did not enter	
2018	Did not enter	
2020	Did not qualify	
2022	Did not qualify	
2024	Did not qualify	
2026	Did not qualify	
2028	To be determined	
2030	To be determined	

=== Sudirman Cup ===
Year	Round	Pos
1989 to 1995	Did not enter	
1997	Group stage	51st
1999	Group stage	42nd
2001	Group stage	46th
2003	Did not enter	
2005	Did not enter	
2007	Did not enter	
2009	Did not enter	
2011	Did not enter	
2013	Did not enter	
2015	Group stage	20th
2017	Did not enter	
2019	Did not enter	
2021	Did not enter	
2023	Did not qualify	
2025	Did not qualify	
2027	To be determined	
2029	To be determined	

=== Pan American Team Championships ===
==== Men's team ====
Year	Round	Pos
2016	Did not enter	
2018	Did not enter	
2020	Group stage	5th
2022	Runners-up	2nd
2024	Runners-up	2nd
2026	Third place	3rd
2028	To be determined	
2030	To be determined	

==== Women's team ====
Year	Round	Pos
2016	Did not enter	
2018	Did not enter	
2020	Third place	3rd
2022	Third place	3rd
2024	Third place	3rd
2026	Third place	3rd
2028	To be determined	
2030	To be determined	

==== Mixed team ====
Year	Round	Pos
1977 to 1980	Did not enter	
1987	Group stage	7th
1989	Did not enter	
1991	Did not enter	
1993	Fourth place	4th
1997	Group stage	6th
2001	Group stage	5th
2004	Fifth place	5th
2005	Did not enter	
2007	Group stage	6th
2008	Group stage	5th
2009	Fourth place	4th
2010	Group stage	5th
2012	Third place	3rd
2013	Third place	3rd
2014	Third place	3rd
2016	Runners-up	2nd
2017	Runners-up	2nd
2019	Third place	3rd
2023	Third place	3rd
2025	Third place	3rd
2027	To be determined	
2029	To be determined	

=== South American Games ===
==== Mixed team ====
Year	Round	Pos
2010	Runners-up	2nd
2018	Champions	1st
2022	Champions	1st

=== South American Team Championships ===
==== Men's team ====
Year	Round	Pos
1985	Champions	1st
1990	Runners-up	2nd

==== Women's team ====
Year	Round	Pos
1990	Runners-up	2nd

==== Mixed team ====
Year	Round	Pos
1984	Third place	3rd
1988	Runners-up	2nd
1996	Runners-up	2nd
1998	Runners-up	2nd
2012	Champions	1st
2013	Did not enter	
2014	Champions	1st
2015	Champions	1st
2016	Champions	1st
2017	Third place	3rd
2018	Runners-up	2nd
2019	Runners-up	2nd
2020	Runners-up	2nd
2022	Runners-up	2nd
2023	Champions	1st
2024	Runners-up	2nd

=== FISU World University Games ===
==== Mixed team ====
Year	Round	Pos
2007	Did not enter	
2011	Did not enter	
2013	Group stage	
2015	Group stage	
2017	Group stage	
2021	Group stage	
2025	To be determined	

=== World University Team Championships ===
==== Mixed team ====
Year	Round	Pos
2008	Did not enter	
2010	Did not enter	
2012	Did not enter	
2014	Group stage	
2016	Did not enter	
2018	Did not enter	

**Red border color indicates tournament was held on home soil.

== Junior competitive record ==
=== Suhandinata Cup ===
Year	Round	Pos
(China) 2000	Did not enter	
(South Africa) 2002	Did not enter	
(Canada) 2004	Did not enter	
(South Korea) 2006	Did not enter	
(New Zealand) 2007	Did not enter	
(India) 2008	Did not enter	
(Malaysia) 2009	Did not enter	
(Mexico) 2010	Did not enter	
(Taiwan) 2011	Did not enter	
(Japan) 2012	Did not enter	
(Thailand) 2013	Did not enter	
(Malaysia) 2014	Did not enter	
(Peru) 2015	Did not enter	
(Spain) 2016	Did not enter	
(Indonesia) 2017	Group stage	21st of 44
(Canada) 2018	Group stage	19th of 39
(Russia) 2019	Did not enter	
(New Zealand) 2020	Cancelled because of COVID-19 pandemic	
(China) 2021	Cancelled because of COVID-19 pandemic	
(Spain) 2022	Did not enter	
(United States) 2023	Group stage	24th of 38
(China) 2024	Withdrew	
(India) 2025	Group stage	29th of 36
(Egypt) 2026	Group stage	26th of 47

=== Pan American Junior Team Championships ===
==== Mixed team ====
Year	Round	Pos
1977 to 1996	Did not enter	
1998	Group stage	6th
2000	Group stage	6th
2002	Group stage	5th
2004	Fourth place	4th
2006	Fourth place	4th
2007	Group stage	
2008	Fourth place	4th
2009	Fourth place	4th
2010	Fourth place	4th
2011	Runners-up	2nd
2012	Third place	3rd
2013	Runners-up	2nd
2014	Runners-up	2nd
2015	Runners-up	2nd
2016	Runners-up	2nd
2017	Third place	3rd
2018	Runners-up	2nd
2019	Third place	3rd
2021	Runners-up	2nd
2022	Third place	3rd
2023	Group stage	5th
2024	Fourth place	4th
2025	Third place	3rd
2026	Fourth place	4th

=== South American Junior Team Championships ===
==== Mixed team ====
Year	Round	Pos
1997	Runners-up	2nd
2000	Third place	3rd
2001	Runners-up	2nd
2005	Runners-up	2nd
2009	Runners-up	2nd
2012	Champions	1st
2013	Champions	1st
2014	Champions	1st
2015	Champions	1st
2016	Runners-up	2nd
2017	Runners-up	2nd
2018	Third place	3rd
2019	Champions	1st
2020	Did not enter	
2022	Runners-up	2nd
2023	Did not enter	
2024	Champions	1st

**Red border color indicates tournament was held on home soil.

== Coaches ==
The following shows a list of coaches for the Brazil national badminton team.

=== Current coaches ===
- (Portugal) Marco Vasconcelos (March 2013 – present)
- (Brazil) Fabiana Silva (2022–present)
- (Brazil) Norma Rodrigues (2017–present)

=== Former coaches ===
- (Indonesia) (Brazil) Roy Ong Sioe Khing (1983–1992)
- (Portugal) (Brazil) Luis Manuel Barreto (1983–1995)
- (Brazil) José Ariovaldo Scudeler (1992–2009)
- (Brazil) Leandro Santos (1998–2008)
- (Brazil) Cláudio Santos (2006)

== Players ==
=== Current squad ===
As of 2 January 2024

==== Men's team ====
Name	DoB/Age	Ranking of event		
Name	DoB/Age	MS	MD	XD
Ygor Coelho	24 November 1996 (age 29)	47	–	–
Izak Batalha	9 May 2000 (age 26)	–	321	–
Fabrício Farias	8 May 2000 (age 26)	–	62	57
Rafael Faria	3 January 2002 (age 24)	1245	591	1021
Jonathan Matias	10 February 2000 (age 26)	59	403	–
Donnians Oliveira	21 November 2000 (age 25)	894	717	–
Davi Silva	15 June 2003 (age 23)	228	62	46
Deivid Silva	15 June 2003 (age 23)	382	–	482
Gabriel Cury	24 March 2003 (age 23)	709	591	1021
Matheus Voigt	20 February 1997 (age 29)	–	321	361

==== Women's team ====
Name	DoB/Age	Ranking of event		
Name	DoB/Age	WS	WD	XD
Juliana Viana Vieira	23 September 2004 (age 22)	53	50	–
Jeisiane Alves	30 March 1999 (age 27)	282	–	361
Jaqueline Lima	23 April 2001 (age 25)	–	57	57
Sâmia Lima	8 June 2000 (age 26)	153	57	482
Sânia Lima	26 August 2002 (age 24)	–	50	46
Juliana Barboza	13 November 2007 (age 18)	586	502	–
Laura Ribeiro	4 September 2007 (age 19)	726	502	1021
Sayane Regina Lima	18 November 2002 (age 23)	580	580	–
Natalya Geisler	22 April 2004 (age 22)	726	589	633
Natalia Batalini de Lima	31 October 2003 (age 22)	726	589	740
