= 2015 South American Badminton Championships =

Tournament details
- Dates: 6–13 December
- Edition: 10th
- Venue: Ginásio Costa Cavalcante
- Location: Foz do Iguaçu, Brazil

The 2015 South American Badminton Championships (Portuguese: Campeonato Sul-Americano Adulto de Badminton 2015) was a badminton tournament sanctioned by the South American Badminton Confederation and Badminton Pan America. The individual and mixed team events were held from 6 to 13 December 2015.

The tournament was held at Ginásio Costa Cavalcante located in Foz do Iguaçu, Brazil. Five countries took part in the tournament.

In the team event, hosts Brazil finished in first place after defeating their opponents 5–0. Chile finished in second place with two wins while Argentina finished in third place with one win. Debutants Paraguay placed fourth.

== Medal summary ==
=== Medalists ===
Event	Gold	Silver	Bronze
Men's singles	(Brazil) Ygor Coelho	(Brazil) Luíz dos Santos	(Brazil) Alisson Vasconcellos
Men's singles	(Brazil) Ygor Coelho	(Brazil) Luíz dos Santos	(Brazil) Italo Hauer
Women's singles	(Brazil) Fabiana Silva	(Peru) Dánica Nishimura	(Brazil) Mariana Pedrol Freitas
Women's singles	(Brazil) Fabiana Silva	(Peru) Dánica Nishimura	(Brazil) Paloma da Silva
Men's doubles	(Brazil) Hugo Arthuso (Brazil) Ygor Coelho	(Brazil) Leonardo Alkimin (Brazil) Luíz dos Santos	(Brazil) Alisson Vasconcellos (Brazil) Eduardo Vaz
Men's doubles	(Brazil) Hugo Arthuso (Brazil) Ygor Coelho	(Brazil) Leonardo Alkimin (Brazil) Luíz dos Santos	(Brazil) Pedro Chen (Brazil) Gabriel Gandara
Women's doubles	(Brazil) Fabiana Silva (Brazil) Paula Pereira	(Peru) Camilla García (Peru) Daniela Zapata	(Brazil) Marta Lopes (Brazil) Paloma da Silva
Women's doubles	(Brazil) Fabiana Silva (Brazil) Paula Pereira	(Peru) Camilla García (Peru) Daniela Zapata	(Brazil) Emanuelly Rocha Farias (Brazil) Andreza Miranda Santos
Mixed doubles	(Brazil) Luíz dos Santos (Brazil) Ana Paula Campos	(Brazil) Hugo Arthuso (Brazil) Fabiana Silva	(Brazil) Francielton Farias (Brazil) Gabrielle Cavalcante
Mixed doubles	(Brazil) Luíz dos Santos (Brazil) Ana Paula Campos	(Brazil) Hugo Arthuso (Brazil) Fabiana Silva	(Brazil) Guilherme Kumasaka (Brazil) Thalita Correa
Mixed team	Brazil; Leonardo Alkimin; Hugo Arthuso; Pedro Chen; Ygor Coelho; Lucas Constant; Mateus Cutti; Francielton Farias; Gabriel Gandara; Kelvin Santos Gimenez; Italo Hauer; Luiz Eduardo Martinez; Luíz dos Santos; Alisson Vasconcellos; Eduardo Vaz; Ana Paula Campos; Thalita Correa; Emanuelly Rocha Farias; Mariana Freitas; Marta Lopes; Bianca Lima; Paula Pereira; Andreza Miranda Santos; Gabriela Santos; Fabiana Silva; Paloma da Silva; Naira Vier	Chile; Cristián Araya; Patricio Álvarez; Iván León; Bastián Lizama; Camila Macaya; Andrea Montero; Tamara Perez; Loreto Pontigo; Paulina Pontigo	Argentina; Pablo Daffis; Dino Delmastro; Ezequiel Garmendia; Javier de Paepe; Martín Trejo; Serafín Zayas; Daiana Garmendia; Adriana Schwiderke

=== Medal table ===
* Host nation (Brazil)

Rank	Nation	Gold	Silver	Bronze	Total
1	Brazil*	6	3	10	19
2	Peru	0	2	0	2
3	Chile	0	1	0	1
4	Argentina	0	0	1	1
Totals (4 entries)		6	6	11	23

== Team event ==
=== Round robin ===
Team	Pld	W	L	MF	MA	MD	Pts	Qualification
Brazil	3	3	0	15	0	+15	3	Champions
Chile	3	2	1	10	5	+5	2	Runners-up
Argentina	3	1	2	5	10	−5	1	Third place
Paraguay	3	0	3	0	15	−15	0	Fourth place

Brazil	5–0	Chile
Brazil	5–0	Argentina
Brazil	5–0	Paraguay
Chile	5–0	Argentina
Chile	5–0	Paraguay
Argentina	5–0	Paraguay
