= 1990 South American Badminton Championships =

Tournament details
- Dates: 22–28 October
- Edition: 4th
- Venue: Ginásio Municipal de Esportes
- Location: Mairinque, Brazil

The 1990 South American Badminton Championships (Spanish: Campeonato Sul-Aamericano Adulto de Badminton 1990) was a badminton tournament sanctioned by the South American Badminton Confederation and Badminton Pan America. The individual and team events were held from 22 to 28 October 1990.

The tournament was held at Ginásio Municipal de Esportes located in Mairinque, Brazil. Six countries took part in the tournament. Peru won first place in the men's and women's team event, while Brazil finished in second place.

== Medal summary ==
=== Medalists ===
Event	Gold	Silver	Bronze
Men's singles	(Peru) Gustavo Salazar	(Peru) Mario Carulla	(Brazil) Paulo Fam
Men's singles	(Peru) Gustavo Salazar	(Peru) Mario Carulla	(Brazil) Leandro Santos
Women's singles	(Peru) Maria Teresa Montero	(Peru) Silvia Jiménez	(Brazil) Sandra Miashiro
Women's singles	(Peru) Maria Teresa Montero	(Peru) Silvia Jiménez	(Brazil) Lilian Mayer
Men's doubles	(Peru) Mario Carulla (Peru) Gustavo Salazar	(Peru) José Iturriaga (Peru) Federico Valdez	(Peru) Gonzalo Castillo (Peru) Christian Schroeder
Men's doubles	(Peru) Mario Carulla (Peru) Gustavo Salazar	(Peru) José Iturriaga (Peru) Federico Valdez	(Brazil) Hwang Chi Fong (Brazil) Johan Loo
Women's doubles	(Peru) Gloria Jiménez (Peru) Silvia Jiménez	(Peru) Úrsula Blanco (Peru) Maria Teresa Montero	(Brazil) Lilian Mayer (Brazil) Samantha Tjio
Women's doubles	(Peru) Gloria Jiménez (Peru) Silvia Jiménez	(Peru) Úrsula Blanco (Peru) Maria Teresa Montero	(Brazil) Hao Min Huai (Brazil) Waldette Wahba
Mixed doubles	(Peru) Federico Valdez (Peru) Gloria Jiménez	(Peru) Gustavo Salazar (Peru) Maria Teresa Montero	(Brazil) Paulo Fam (Brazil) Sandra Miashiro
Mixed doubles	(Peru) Federico Valdez (Peru) Gloria Jiménez	(Peru) Gustavo Salazar (Peru) Maria Teresa Montero	(Brazil) Leandro Santos (Brazil) Samantha Tjio
Men's team	Peru; Mario Carulla; Gonzalo Castillo; José Iturriaga; Gustavo Salazar; Christian Schroeder; Federico Valdez	Brazil; Ubiratan Alves; Luis Manuel Barreto; Agnaldo Chang; Paulo Fam; Euclides Freitas; Huang Shuang; Hwang Chi Fong; Nelson Lin; Johan Loo; Carlos Machado; Bernardo Mayer; Sergio Mayer	Argentina; Manuel Escudero; Vincent Lo; Oscar Malamud; Alejandro Meyer; Gualterio Meyer; Jorge Meyer; Ronaldo Meyer; Bunting Roy
Women's team	Peru; Úrsula Blanco; Gloria Jiménez; Silvia Jiménez; Maria Teresa Montero	Brazil; Marcia Cabeleira; Sueli Fam; Hao Min Huai; Lilian Mayer; Sandra Miashiro; Maria Aparecida Pacheco; Samantha Tjio; Waldette Wahba	Argentina; Heidi Gerlach; Marion Meyer; Roswitha Meyer; Su Chu Fui

=== Medal table ===
* Host nation (Brazil)

Rank	Nation	Gold	Silver	Bronze	Total
1	Peru	7	5	1	13
2	Brazil*	0	2	9	11
3	Argentina	0	0	2	2
Totals (3 entries)		7	7	12	26

== Team event ==
=== Men's team ===
==== Round robin ====
Team	Pld	W	L	MF	MA	MD	Pts	Qualification
Peru	4	4	0	15	0	+15	3	Champions
Brazil	4	3	1	10	5	+5	2	Runners-up
Argentina	4	2	2	4	11	−7	1	Third place
Uruguay	4	1	3	1	14	−13	0	Fourth place

Peru	5–0	Brazil
Peru	5–0	Argentina
Peru	5–0	Uruguay
Brazil	5–0	Argentina
Brazil	5–0	Uruguay
Argentina	4–1	Uruguay

=== Women's team ===
==== Round robin ====
Team	Pld	W	L	MF	MA	MD	Pts	Qualification
Peru	4	4	0	9	0	+9	3	Champions
Brazil	4	3	1	6	3	+3	2	Runners-up
Argentina	4	2	2	2	7	−5	1	Third place
Uruguay	4	1	3	0	9	−9	0	Fourth place

Peru	3–0	Brazil
Peru	3–0	Argentina
Peru	3–0	Uruguay
Brazil	3–0	Argentina
Brazil	3–0	Uruguay
Argentina	2–1	Uruguay
