= Peru national badminton team =

National badminton team representing Peru

Peru
- Association: Federación Deportiva Peruana de Bádminton (FDPB)
- Confederation: BPA (Pan America)
- President: Gonzalo Castillo

BWF ranking
- Current ranking: 26 ▲2 (2 April 2024)
- Highest ranking: 21 (1 July 2011)

Sudirman Cup
- Appearances: 9 (first in 1993)
- Best result: Group stage

Thomas Cup
- Appearances: 1 (first in 2010)
- Best result: Group stage

Pan Am Mixed Team Championships
- Appearances: 20 (first in 1978)
- Best result: Champions (1993)

Pan Am Men's Team Championships
- Appearances: 4 (first in 2018)
- Best result: Fourth place (2018)

Pan Am Women's Team Championships
- Appearances: 4 (first in 2018)
- Best result: Third place (2018)

The Peru national badminton team (Spanish: Selección de bádminton de Perú) represents Peru in international badminton team competitions. It is controlled by the Peruvian Sports Federation of Badminton (Spanish: Federation Deportiva Peruana de Badminton). Peru is one of the five founding members of Badminton Pan America and one of the three founding members of the South American Badminton Confederation. The national team was formed in 1965.

Peru first qualified for the Thomas Cup in 2010. The team made their first appearance in the Sudirman Cup in 1993. The team have yet to qualify for the Uber Cup. Peru have also won the Pan Am Mixed Team Championships in 1993. The team also competes in the South American Badminton Championships. The team have won the South American mixed team title ten times, in 1984, 1988, 1996, 1998, 2013, 2017, 2018, 2019, 2020 and 2022.

== History ==
=== Men's team ===
The team first took part in qualifying for the 1970 Thomas Cup and lost in the first round to the United States. The team failed to qualify for the 1973 Thomas Cup after losing 9–0 to Canada in the semi-finals. From 1975 to 1990, the team have failed to enter the second round of the Thomas Cup qualifiers. In 1990, the team were champions in the men's team event at the 1990 South American Badminton Championships.

In the 2006 Pan American Thomas Cup Preliminaries, the team advanced to the semi-finals but lost 3–0 to the United States. The team then lost the third place playoff to Guatemala. In 2008, the team placed fourth in the 2008 Pan American Thomas Cup Preliminaries. In 2010, the team made history by upsetting Canada 3–1 in the final of the 2010 Pan American Thomas Cup Preliminaries and qualified for the Thomas Cup on merit for the first time since 1970. The team were drawn to face China and South Korea in Group A at the 2010 Thomas Cup. The team did not advance to the knockout stage after losing 5–0 to China and South Korea.

In 2018, the team entered the semi-finals of the 2018 Pan Am Men's Team Championships but lost 3–2 to the United States. The team then finished fourth after losing 3–0 to Jamaica in the playoffs. In 2024, the team were eliminated in the group stages of the 2024 Pan Am Male Badminton Cup.

=== Women's team ===
In 1981, the team competed in the Pan American zone Uber Cup qualifiers but lost 9–0 to the United States in the semi-final. In 1984, the team placed fourth on the Uber Cup zonal qualifiers. In 1986, the team defeated Jamaica 5–0 to advance to the semi-finals of the Uber Cup zonal qualifiers but lost to Chinese Taipei in the semi-finals. The team then lost to New Zealand 3–2 in the playoffs. In 1990, the team finished in first place at the 1990 South American Badminton Championships women's team event.

In 2006, the team placed fourth at the 2006 Pan American Uber Cup Preliminaries after losing the third place playoff to Cuba. In 2008, the team beat Brazil for third place at the Pan American preliminaries. In 2010, the team reached the final of the Pan American preliminaries and came close to qualifying for their first Uber Cup but fell short and lost 3–1 to the United States. In 2018, the women's team achieved third place at the 2018 Pan Am Women's Team Championships after defeating Guatemala 3–1 in the tie for third place. In 2024, the team lost the third place playoff to Brazil at the 2024 Pan Am Female Badminton Cup.

=== Mixed team ===
In 1978, Peru were runners-up at the 1978 Pan Am Mixed Championships. In 1984, the team became the first ever champions at the South American Badminton Championships mixed team event, defeating Argentina and Brazil. In 1987, the team were runners-up again at the 1987 Pan Am Mixed Championships after losing the final match to Canada. In 1989, the team finished in third place at the 1989 Pan Am Mixed Team Championships. In 1993, the team debuted in the Sudirman Cup and finished in 36th place on the overall rankings. In that same year, the team won the Pan Am Mixed Team Championships for the first time by beating Guatemala 3–2 in the final.

In 1997, the team finished third in the Pan Am Championships. In 2001, the team finished fourth in the Pan Am Championships after losing the third place tie to Guatemala. In 2004, the team made a huge upset when the team defeated the United States in the 2004 Pan Am Mixed Team Championships. The team however lost to Canada to finish second in the tournament. The team achieved third place at the Pan Am Championships back to back in 2005 and 2007 and later finished as runners-up in 2008 and 2009. In 2012, the team failed to make it past the group stage at the Pan Am Mixed Team Championships for the first time after losing to Canada and Brazil in Group A. In 2013, the team won gold in the 2013 Bolivarian Games mixed team event. From 2017 to 2022, the team won five consecutive times at the South American Mixed Team Championships.

In 2022, the team won the 2022 Bolivarian Games mixed team event. In 2023, the team failed to advance to the knockout stage of the 2023 Pan Am Mixed Team Championships after losing to Brazil and Guatemala in Group C.

== Competitive record ==
=== Thomas Cup ===
Year	Round	Pos
1949	Did not enter	
1952	Did not enter	
1955	Did not enter	
1958	Did not enter	
1961	Did not enter	
1964	Did not enter	
1967	Did not enter	
1970	Did not qualify	
1973	Did not qualify	
1976	Did not qualify	
1979	Did not qualify	
1982	Did not qualify	
1984	Did not qualify	
1986	Did not qualify	
1988	Did not qualify	
1990	Did not qualify	
1992	Did not qualify	
1994	Did not qualify	
1996	Did not qualify	
1998	Did not qualify	
2000	Did not qualify	
2002	Did not qualify	
2004	Did not enter	
2006	Did not qualify	
2008	Did not qualify	
2010	Group stage	11th
2012	Did not enter	
2014	Did not enter	
2016	Did not enter	
2018	Did not qualify	
2020	Did not qualify	
2022	Did not qualify	
2024	Did not qualify	
2026	Did not qualify	
2028	To be determined	
2030	To be determined	

=== Uber Cup ===
Year	Round	Pos
1957 to 1966	Did not enter	
1969	Did not qualify	
1972	Did not enter	
1975	Did not enter	
1978	Did not enter	
1981	Did not qualify	
1984	Did not qualify	
1986	Did not qualify	
1988	Did not enter	
1990	Did not qualify	
1992	Did not enter	
1994	Did not qualify	
1996	Did not qualify	
1998	Did not qualify	
2000	Did not qualify	
2002	Did not qualify	
2004	Did not qualify	
2006	Did not qualify	
2008	Did not qualify	
2010	Did not qualify	
2012	Did not enter	
2014	Did not enter	
2016	Did not enter	
2018	Did not qualify	
2020	Did not qualify	
2022	Did not qualify	
2024	Did not qualify	
2026	Did not qualify	
2028	To be determined	
2030	To be determined	

=== Sudirman Cup ===
Year	Round	Pos
1989	Did not qualify	
1991	Did not qualify	
1993	Group stage	36th
1995	Group stage	37th
1997	Group stage	36th
1999	Group stage	34th
2001	Group stage	37th
2003	Group stage	35th
2005	Group stage	32nd
2007	Group stage	38th
2009	Group stage	26th
2011	Did not enter	
2013	Did not enter	
2015	Did not enter	
2017	Did not enter	
2019	Did not enter	
2021	Did not enter	
2023	Did not qualify	
2025	Did not qualify	
2027	To be determined	
2029	To be determined	

=== Pan American Team Championships ===
==== Men's team ====
Year	Round	Pos
2016	Did not enter	
2018	Fourth place	4th
2020	Group stage	6th
2022	Group stage	6th
2024	Group stage	6th
2026	Quarter-finals	5th
2028	To be determined	
2030	To be determined	

==== Women's team ====
Year	Round	Pos
2016	Did not enter	
2018	Third place	3rd
2020	Group stage	5th
2022	Group stage	6th
2024	Fourth place	4th
2026	Quarter-finals	5th
2028	To be determined	
2030	To be determined	

==== Mixed team ====
Year	Round	Pos
1977	Did not enter	
1978	Runners-up	2nd
1979	Did not enter	
1980	Did not enter	
1987	Runners-up	2nd
1989	Third place	3rd
1991	Did not enter	
1993	Champions	1st
1997	Third place	3rd
2001	Fourth place	4th
2004	Runners-up	2nd
2005	Third place	3rd
2007	Third place	3rd
2008	Runners-up	2nd
2009	Runners-up	2nd
2010	Third place	3rd
2012	Group stage	5th
2013	Fourth place	4th
2014	Fourth place	4th
2016	Third place	3rd
2017	Fourth place	4th
2019	Group stage	6th
2023	Group stage	7th
2025	Quarter-finals	6th
2027	To be determined	
2029	To be determined	

=== South American Games ===
==== Mixed team ====
Year	Round	Pos
2010	Champions	1st
2018	Runners-up	2nd
2022	Runners-up	2nd

=== South American Team Championships ===
==== Men's team ====
Year	Round	Pos
1985	Did not enter	
1990	Champions	1st

==== Women's team ====
Year	Round	Pos
1990	Champions	1st

==== Mixed team ====
Year	Round	Pos
1984	Champions	1st
1988	Champions	1st
1996	Champions	1st
1998	Champions	1st
2012	Runners-up	2nd
2013	Champions	1st
2014	Runners-up	2nd
2015	Did not enter	
2016	Runners-up	2nd
2017	Champions	1st
2018	Champions	1st
2019	Champions	1st
2020	Champions	1st
2022	Champions	1st
2023	Runners-up	2nd
2024	Champions	1st

=== Bolivarian Games ===
==== Mixed team ====
Year	Round	Pos
2009	Champions	1st
2013	Champions	1st
2017	Runners-up	2nd
2022	Champions	1st

**Red border color indicates tournament was held on home soil.

== Junior competitive record ==
=== Suhandinata Cup ===
Year	Round	Pos
2000	Did not enter	
2002	Did not enter	
2004	Group stage	16th
2006	Did not enter	
2007	Did not enter	
2008	Did not enter	
2009	Did not enter	
2010	Group stage	18th
2011	Did not enter	
2012	Did not enter	
2013	Did not enter	
2014	Did not enter	
2015	Group stage	20th
2016	Group stage	35th
2017	Did not enter	
2018	Group stage	23rd
2019	Group stage	36th
2022	Group stage	23rd
2023	Group stage	28th
2024	Group stage	24th
2025	Did not enter	
2026	Group stage	29th of 47

=== Pan American Junior Team Championships ===
==== Mixed team ====
Year	Round	Pos
1977	Fourth place	4th
1978	Fourth place	4th
1979	Third place	3rd
1980	Third place	3rd
1981	Champions	1st
1988	Runners-up	2nd
1990	Did not enter	
1991	Runners-up	2nd
1992	Champions	1st
1994	Did not enter	
1996	Third place	3rd
1998	Did not enter	
2000	Fourth place	4th
2002	Runners-up	2nd
2004	Third place	3rd
2006	Champions	1st
2007	Runners-up	2nd
2008	Champions	1st
2009	Runners-up	2nd
2010	Runners-up	2nd
2011	Group stage	5th
2012	Fourth place	4th
2013	Group stage	6th
2014	Group stage	6th
2015	Group stage	7th
2016	Group stage	5th
2017	Group stage	6th
2018	Group stage	5th
2019	Fourth place	4th
2021	Fourth place	4th
2022	Fourth place	4th
2023	Third place	3rd
2024	Group stage	5th
2025	Group stage	5th
2026	Third place	3rd

=== South American Junior Team Championships ===
==== Mixed team ====
Year	Round	Pos
1997	Champions	1st
2000	Champions	1st
2001	Champions	1st
2005	Champions	1st
2009	Champions	1st
2012	Runners-up	2nd
2013	Runners-up	2nd
2014	Runners-up	2nd
2015	Runners-up	2nd
2016	Champions	1st
2017	Runners-up	2nd
2018	Champions	1st
2019	Runners-up	2nd
2020	Champions	1st
2022	Champions	1st
2023	Champions	1st
2024	Runners-up	2nd

**Red border color indicates tournament was held on home soil.

== Players ==
=== Current squad ===
As of 6 September 2024

==== Men's team ====
Name	DoB/Age	Ranking of event		
Name	DoB/Age	MS	MD	XD
Adriano Viale	1 September 2004 (age 22)	102	311	312
Kalei Kuan-Veng	4 July 2005 (age 21)	485	589	557
Brian Roque	24 September 2002 (age 24)	535	447	-
Sharum Durand	24 September 2005 (age 21)	585	346	264
Alejandro Chueca	29 April 2003 (age 23)	598	346	764
José Guevara	6 October 1998 (age 28)	910	182	139
Saúl Andrade	5 November 2005 (age 20)	1330	788	
Diego Mini	13 April 1999 (age 27)	-	182	219
Diego Subauste	13 March 2000 (age 26)	-	311	557
Bengy Laime	10 November 2005 (age 20)	-	788	764

==== Women's team ====
Name	DoB/Age	Ranking of event		
Name	DoB/Age	WS	WD	XD
Inés Castillo	7 December 1999 (age 26)	57	168	139
Fernanda Munar	5 December 2005 (age 20)	203	131	440
Fernanda Saponara	12 July 2001 (age 25)	209	-	312
Namie Miyahira	11 February 2005 (age 21)	343	206	264
Rafaela Munar	5 December 2005 (age 20)	350	131	557
Paula la Torre	15 April 1999 (age 27)	-	168	219

==== Junior U-19 ====
Name	DoB/Age
Estefanía Canchanya	23 February 2006 (age 20)
Rafaela Castañeda	20 January 2007 (age 19)
Gonzalo Castillo	23 March 2006 (age 20)
Valeria Chuquimaqui	13 January 2006 (age 20)
Alejandro Crisanto	4 August 2007 (age 19)
Fabrizio Gutiérrez	26 June 2007 (age 19)
Fabrizio Huamán	24 September 2007 (age 19)
Taisia Kasianov	14 December 2007 (age 18)
Maurice Martin	22 February 2007 (age 19)
Marcelo Novoa	2 February 2006 (age 20)
José Rendon	24 June 2006 (age 20)
Rafaela Silva	6 February 2007 (age 19)
Fabrizio Valdivieso	11 August 2006 (age 20)

=== Previous squads ===
Name	DoB/Age
Remo Blondet	19 April 2003 (age 23)
Fabrizio Tabini	6 April 2004 (age 22)
Daniel la Torre	20 August 1997 (age 29)
Sofia Junco	29 August 2008 (age 18)
Carla Valdivia	20 March 2008 (age 18)
Bruno Barrueto	7 June 2000 (age 26)
Inés Mendoza	18 August 2001 (age 25)

==== Thomas Cup ====
- 2010
