= 1985 South American Badminton Championships =

Tournament details
- Dates: 1–5 November
- Edition: 2nd
- Venue: Coliseo del Parque Sarmiento
- Location: Buenos Aires, Argentina

The 1985 South American Badminton Championships (Spanish: Campeonato Sudamericano Adulto de Badminton 1985) was a badminton tournament sanctioned by the South American Badminton Confederation. The tournament was held from 1 to 5 November 1985.

== Background ==
Originally, six countries were supposed to take part in this event.

Only three events were held in this edition of the tournament, which were men's singles, men's doubles and the men's team competition. Brazil won all three events. Uruguay made their first appearance in the championships.

The championships were held simultaneously with the Rio de la Plata Badminton Open (Spanish: Abierto Río de la Plata) in the same venue.

== Medal summary ==
=== Medalists ===
Event	Gold	Silver	Bronze
Men's singles	(Brazil) Roy Ong Sioe Khing	(Argentina) Guillermo Pefaur	(Brazil) Hwang Chi Fong
Men's doubles	(Brazil) Luis Manuel Barreto (Brazil) Roy Ong Sioe Khing	(Argentina) Guillermo Pefaur (Argentina) Horacio Pozzo	(Argentina) Vincent Lo (Argentina) Anwar Luthan
Men's team	Brazil; Luis Manuel Barreto; Michel Bex; Hwang Chi Fong; Roy Ong Sioe Khing	Argentina; Vincent Lo; Anwar Luthan; Guillermo Pefaur; Horacio Pozzo	Uruguay; Fernando Damiani; Pablo Damiani; Diego Degradi; Hugo Fleitas

=== Medal table ===
* Host nation (Argentina)

Rank	Nation	Gold	Silver	Bronze	Total
1	Brazil	3	0	1	4
2	Argentina*	0	3	1	4
3	Uruguay	0	0	1	1
Totals (3 entries)		3	3	3	9

== Team event ==
=== Round robin ===
Team	Pld	W	L	MF	MA	MD	Pts	Qualification
Brazil	2	2	0	6	0	+6	2	Champions
Argentina	2	1	1	3	3	0	1	Runners-up
Uruguay	2	0	2	0	6	−6	0	Third place

Brazil
3
Coliseo del Parque Sarmiento
1 November 1985

Argentina
0

			1	2	3
1	(Brazil) (Argentina)	Hwang Chi Fong; Guillermo Pefaur
2	(Brazil) (Argentina)	Roy Ong Sioe Khing; Anwar Luthan
3	(Brazil) (Argentina)	Luis Manuel Barreto / Roy Ong Sioe Khing; Guillermo Pefaur / Horacio Pozzo

Argentina
3
Coliseo del Parque Sarmiento
1 November 1985

Uruguay
0

			1	2	3
1	(Argentina) (Uruguay)	Guillermo Pefaur; Fernando Damiani
2	(Argentina) (Uruguay)	Anwar Luthan; Diego Degradi
3	(Argentina) (Uruguay)	Guillermo Pefaur / Horacio Pozzo; Fernando Damiani / Pedro Damiani

Brazil
3
Coliseo del Parque Sarmiento
2 November 1985

Uruguay
0

			1	2	3
1	(Brazil) (Uruguay)	Hwang Chi Fong; Fernando Damiani	15; 5	15; 5
2	(Brazil) (Uruguay)	Roy Ong Sioe Khing; Diego Degradi	11; 0	11; 1
3	(Brazil) (Uruguay)	Luis Manuel Barreto / Roy Ong Sioe Khing; Fernando Damiani / Pedro Damiani	15; 5	15; 2
