= 1984 South American Badminton Championships =

Tournament details
- Dates: 29 October–5 November
- Edition: 1st
- Venue: Coliseo del Parque Sarmiento
- Location: Buenos Aires, Argentina

The 1984 South American Badminton Championships (Spanish: Campeonato Sudamericano Adulto de Badminton 1984) was a badminton tournament sanctioned by the South American Badminton Confederation. It was the first edition of the championships.

The individual and mixed team events were held from 29 October to 5 November 1984. The tournament was held at Coliseo del Parque Sarmiento located in Buenos Aires, Argentina.

In the mixed team event, the Peruvian team became the first South American team champions, winning against Argentina and Brazil. Argentina finished second while Brazil finished in third place.

== Medal summary ==
=== Medalists ===
| Event | Gold | Silver | Bronze |
|---|---|---|---|
| Men's singles | (Peru) Federico Valdez | (Peru) Germán Valdez | (Peru) Gustavo Salazar |
| Men's singles | (Peru) Federico Valdez | (Peru) Germán Valdez | (Peru) Guillermo Zavala |
| Women's singles | (Peru) Silvia Jiménez | (Peru) Teresa Montero | (Peru) Ximena Bellido |
| Women's singles | (Peru) Silvia Jiménez | (Peru) Teresa Montero | (Peru) Gloria Jiménez |
| Men's doubles | (Peru) Federico Valdez (Peru) Germán Valdez | (Peru) Alfredo Salazar (Peru) Gustavo Salazar | (Brazil) Chen Wen Hau (Brazil) Roy Ong Sioe Khing |
| Men's doubles | (Peru) Federico Valdez (Peru) Germán Valdez | (Peru) Alfredo Salazar (Peru) Gustavo Salazar | (Argentina) Guillermo Pefaur (Argentina) Ignacio Robredo |
| Women's doubles | (Peru) Ximena Bellido (Peru) Gloria Jiménez | (Peru) Carmen Bellido (Peru) Silvia Jiménez | (Brazil) Susan Case (Brazil) Márcia Oey |
| Women's doubles | (Peru) Ximena Bellido (Peru) Gloria Jiménez | (Peru) Carmen Bellido (Peru) Silvia Jiménez | (Argentina) Silvia Bugallo (Argentina) Roswitha Szczepanski |
| Mixed doubles | (Peru) Gustavo Salazar (Peru) Gloria Jiménez | (Peru) Federico Valdez (Peru) Silvia Jiménez | (Peru) Germán Valdez (Peru) Ximena Bellido |
| Mixed doubles | (Peru) Gustavo Salazar (Peru) Gloria Jiménez | (Peru) Federico Valdez (Peru) Silvia Jiménez | (Peru) Guillermo Zavala (Peru) Teresa Montero |
| Mixed team | Peru; Alfredo Salazar; Gustavo Salazar; Federico Valdez; Germán Valdez; Guillermo Zavala; Carmen Bellido; Ximena Bellido; Gloria Jiménez; Silvia Jiménez; Teresa Montero | Argentina; Vincent Lo; Anwar Luthan; Oscar Malamud; Guillermo Pefaur; Ignacio Robredo; Gualterio Meyer; Silvia Bugallo; Roswitha Szczepanski; Renate Wild; Laura Berríos | Brazil; Luis Manuel Barreto; Chen Wen Hau; Hwang Chi Fong; Lou Yen Chuan; Roy Ong Sioe Khing; Eduardo Simão; Tjio Si Go; Susan Case; Huan Yeh Chui Mei; Márcia Oey |

=== Medal table ===
* Host nation (Argentina)

| Rank | Nation | Gold | Silver | Bronze | Total |
|---|---|---|---|---|---|
| 1 | Peru | 6 | 5 | 6 | 17 |
| 2 | Argentina* | 0 | 1 | 2 | 3 |
| 3 | Brazil | 0 | 0 | 3 | 3 |
| Totals (3 entries) | | 6 | 6 | 11 | 23 |

== Team event ==
=== Round robin ===
| Team | Pld | W | L | MF | MA | MD | Pts | Qualification |
|---|---|---|---|---|---|---|---|---|
| Peru | 2 | 2 | 0 | 10 | 0 | +20 | 2 | Champions |
| Argentina | 2 | 1 | 1 | 3 | 7 | −4 | 1 | Runners-up |
| Brazil | 2 | 0 | 2 | 2 | 8 | −6 | 0 | Third place |

| Peru | 5–0 | Brazil |
| Argentina | 3–2 | Brazil |
| Peru | 5–0 | Argentina |
