= Badminton Pan America =

Badminton governing body

- Abbreviation: PANAM
- Formation: February 13th, 1976
- Type: Sports federation
- Headquarters: Lima, Peru
- Members: 37 member associations
- President: José Armando Bruni Ochoa
- Website: http://www.badmintonpanam.org/

The Badminton Pan Am (BPA) organisation is the governing body for the sport of badminton in the Americas and is recognized as such by the Badminton World Federation - BWF. It was founded as a continental governing body on February 13, 1976 in the headquarters of the Mexican Olympic Committee in Mexico City. The Pan American Badminton Confederation was founded by Badminton Canada, the Jamaica Badminton Association, Federacion Mexicana de Badminton, Comision Nacional de Badminton Peru and the United States Badminton Association. BPAC was founded in Mexico City in 1976 and had nominated Victor Jaramillo of Mexico as President until an official election was scheduled to take place at the first Pan Am Championships the following year. The first Badminton Pan Am Championships was held in Moncton, New Brunswick-Canada, in April 1977.

Jaramillo was confirmed as president and stayed in that position until 1981. During these five years, the Pan American Badminton Championships were held in Canada, Peru, Mexico, and USA. Pan Am Junior Championships were held in Mexico, Canada, USA and Peru. From 1981 to 1987, there was no contest until November 1987 when the V Pan Am Badminton Championships was held in Lima, Peru.

Outstanding efforts were made by Helen Baxter of Canada in trying to reactivate the Pan American Badminton Confederation since 1982 and also with the help on the part of the Badminton Peru National Commission President, José Andrés Bellido, Badminton Pan Am once again became an active member of the then International Badminton Federation in 1987. During the 5th Badminton Pan Am Championships, held in Lima, Peru, in November 1987, there was a congress to re-establish Pan Am Badminton Confederation. At the Thomas and Uber Cup preliminaries for the Pan Am Continent in February 1988, Canadian Pierre Blouin was elected president.

The mission of the Badminton Pan Am includes promoting the sport, organizing regional tournaments, certifying referees and umpires, maintaining a set of unified rules, and providing a forum for member nations. There are now currently 37 member associations, of which 3 countries are associate members (French Guiana, Guadeloupe & Martinique). Its headquarters are now located in Lima, Peru.

Following a general meeting held in Campinas, Brazil back in November, 2006, the confederation decided to change the name from Pan American Badminton Confederation to Badminton Pan Am.

== Member associations ==
Badminton Pan Am has 37 member associations:

- Argentina
- Aruba
- Barbados
- Bermuda
- Brazil
- Bolivia
- Canada
- Cayman Islands
- Chile
- Colombia
- Costa Rica
- Cuba
- Curaçao
- Dominican Republic
- Ecuador
- El Salvador
- Falkland Islands
- French Guiana (associate member)
- Grenada
- Guadeloupe (associate member)
- Guatemala
- Guyana
- Haiti
- Honduras
- Jamaica
- Martinique (associate member)
- Mexico
- Panama
- Paraguay
- Peru
- Puerto Rico
- Saint Lucia
- Suriname
- Trinidad and Tobago
- United States
- Uruguay
- Venezuela

Logo of the Pan American Badminton Confederation prior to 2006

Logo of the Pan American Badminton Confederation from 2006 to 2016

== Badminton Pan Am Presidents ==
No.	Years	Name	Country
1	1976 – 1981	Victor Jaramillo Villalobos	Mexico
2	1988 – 1990	Pierre Blouin	Canada
3	1990 – 1995	Elizabeth de Erichsen	Guatemala
4	1995 – 2003	Federico Valdez	Peru
5	2003 – 2005	Joseph Mervyn Gordon	Barbados
6	2005 – 2015	Gustavo Salazar	Peru
7	2015 – 2023	Vishu Tolan	Jamaica
8	2023 – present	José Armando Bruni Ochoa	El Salvador

== Tournaments ==
- Pan American Badminton Championships
- Pan Am Junior Badminton Championships
