= 2021 South American Badminton Championships =

Tournament details
- Dates: 29 November–5 December
- Edition: 16th
- Venue: Ginásio Univille - Campus Bom Retiro
- Location: Joinville, Brazil

The 2021 South American Badminton Championships (Portuguese: Campeonato Sul-Americano Adulto de Badminton 2021) was a badminton tournament sanctioned by the South American Badminton Confederation and Badminton Pan America. The individual and mixed team events were held from 29 November to 5 December 2021.

The tournament was held at Ginásio Univille located in Joinville, Brazil. Five countries took part in the tournament. Following Peru's withdrawal from the tournament, hosts Brazil showed dominance and swept all the medals in the individual events.

Five teams competed in the round-robin team event. Brazil finished in first place with four wins. Ecuador finished as runners-up while Argentina took third place.

== Medal summary ==
=== Medalists ===
Event	Gold	Silver	Bronze
Men's singles	(Brazil) Donnians Oliveira	(Brazil) Jonathan Matias	(Brazil) Waleson Santos
Men's singles	(Brazil) Donnians Oliveira	(Brazil) Jonathan Matias	(Brazil) Artur Pomoceno
Women's singles	(Brazil) Juliana Vieira	(Brazil) Jaqueline Lima	(Brazil) Jackeline Luz
Women's singles	(Brazil) Juliana Vieira	(Brazil) Jaqueline Lima	(Brazil) Lorena Vieira
Men's doubles	(Brazil) Fabrício Farias (Brazil) Francielton Farias	(Brazil) William Guimarães (Brazil) Matheus Voigt	(Brazil) Mateus Cutti (Brazil) Alisson Vasconcellos
Men's doubles	(Brazil) Fabrício Farias (Brazil) Francielton Farias	(Brazil) William Guimarães (Brazil) Matheus Voigt	(Brazil) Donnians Oliveira (Brazil) Artur Pomoceno
Women's doubles	(Brazil) Jaqueline Lima (Brazil) Sâmia Lima	(Brazil) Bianca Lima (Brazil) Tamires Santos	(Brazil) Monaliza Feitosa (Brazil) Lorena Vieira
Women's doubles	(Brazil) Jaqueline Lima (Brazil) Sâmia Lima	(Brazil) Bianca Lima (Brazil) Tamires Santos	(Brazil) Júlia Stefany (Brazil) Gabriela Ywata
Mixed doubles	(Brazil) Fabrício Farias (Brazil) Jaqueline Lima	(Brazil) Francielton Farias (Brazil) Sâmia Lima	(Brazil) Matheus Voigt (Brazil) Tamires Santos
Mixed doubles	(Brazil) Fabrício Farias (Brazil) Jaqueline Lima	(Brazil) Francielton Farias (Brazil) Sâmia Lima	(Brazil) Gabriel Cury (Brazil) Jackeline Luz
Mixed team	Brazil; Izak Batalha; Mateus Cutti; Fabrício Farias; Francielton Farias; William Guimarães; Jonathan Matias; Donnians Oliveira; Artur Pomoceno; Matheus Voigt; Waleson dos Santos; Jeisiane Alves; Renata Faustino; Jaqueline Lima; Sâmia Lima; Sânia Lima; Jackeline Luz; Bianca Lima; Juliana Vieira	Ecuador; Alan Erben; Henry Huebla; Emilio Zambrano; Brittany Navarrete; Melanie Mandich; Maria Zambrano	Argentina; Román Alberino; Sebastian Contró; Mateo Ibarra; Mateo Jara; Matias Lema; Mateo Maira; Eric Mancini; Franco Motto; Santiago Otero; Martina Arnold; Morena Cano; Morena Guidici; Maria Morel; Ailén Oliva; Yovela Petrucci

=== Medal table ===
* Host nation (Brazil)

Rank	Nation	Gold	Silver	Bronze	Total
1	Brazil*	6	5	10	21
2	Ecuador	0	1	0	1
3	Argentina	0	0	1	1
Totals (3 entries)		6	6	11	23

== Team event ==
=== Round robin ===
Pos	Team	Pld	W	L	MF	MA	MD	GF	GA	GD	PF	PA	PD	Pts	Qualification
1	Brazil (H)	4	4	0	20	0	+20	40	0	+40	841	339	+502	4	Champions
2	Ecuador	4	3	1	9	11	−2	20	24	−4	704	771	−67	3	Runners-up
3	Argentina	4	2	2	10	10	0	21	20	+1	661	739	−78	2	Third place
4	Chile	4	1	3	4	11	−7	9	23	−14	444	619	−175	1	Fourth place
5	Paraguay	4	0	4	2	13	−11	5	28	−23	476	658	−182	0	Fifth place

Source: TS
(H) Host

Brazil
5
Ginásio Univille
1 December 2021, 09:30 UTC−3

Ecuador
0

			1	2	3
1	(Brazil) (Ecuador)	Jeisiane Alves; Maria Delia Zambrano	21; 9	22; 20
2	(Brazil) (Ecuador)	Fabrício Farias / Francielton Farias; Alan Erben / Emilio Zambrano	21; 4	21; 10
3	(Brazil) (Ecuador)	Artur Silva Pomoceno; Henry Huebla	21; 13	21; 7
4	(Brazil) (Ecuador)	Sânia Lima / Tamires dos Santos; Brittany Navarrete / Melanie Mandich Tumbaco	21; 3	21; 7
5	(Brazil) (Ecuador)	Waleson dos Santos / Sayane Regina Lima; Alan Erben / Maria Delia Zambrano	21; 10	21; 11

Chile
2
Ginásio Univille
1 December 2021, 09:30 UTC−3

Argentina
3

			1	2	3
1	(Chile) (Argentina)	Constanza Naranjo / Belén Troncoso; Ailen Oliva / Yovela Petrucci	18; 21	16; 21
2	(Chile) (Argentina)	Cristián Araya / Fernando Sanhueza; Mateo Maira / Santiago Otero	15; 21	13; 21
3	(Chile) (Argentina)	Belén Troncoso; Ailen Oliva	16; 21	20; 22
4	(Chile) (Argentina)	Fernando Sanhueza; Santiago Otero	21; 18	21; 17
5	(Chile) (Argentina)	Cristián Araya / Constanza Naranjo; Mateo Maira / Yovela Petrucci	21; 15	18; 21	21; 13

Ecuador
3
Ginásio Univille
2 December 2021, 09:00 UTC−3

Paraguay
2

			1	2	3
1	(Ecuador) (Paraguay)	Emilio Zambrano / Melanie Mandich Tumbaco; Leo Lee / Ana Amarilla	14; 21	21; 17	11; 21
2	(Ecuador) (Paraguay)	Maria Delia Zambrano; Camila Alvarez	21; 9	21; 14
3	(Ecuador) (Paraguay)	Emilio Zambrano / Henry Huebla; Kentaro Asoh / Leo Lee	13; 21	21; 16	16; 21
4	(Ecuador) (Paraguay)	Melanie Mandich Tumbaco / Maria Delia Zambrano; Camila Alvarez / Cecilia Haneman	21; 15	13; 21	22; 20
5	(Ecuador) (Paraguay)	Alan Erben; Kentaro Asoh	21; 10	21; 10

Brazil
5
Ginásio Univille
2 December 2021, 09:00 UTC−3

Chile
0

			1	2	3
1	(Brazil) (Chile)	Artur Silva Pomoceno; Sebastián Vásquez	21; 6	21; 5
2	(Brazil) (Chile)	Jeisiane Alves; Rosa Quilodrán	21; 7	22; 9
3	(Brazil) (Chile)	William Guimarães / Matheus Voigt; Benjamín Bahamondez / Cristian Araya	21; 9	21; 7
4	(Brazil) (Chile)	Sânia Lima / Tamires dos Santos; Brittany Navarrete / Melanie Mandich Tumbaco	21; 5	21; 7
5	(Brazil) (Chile)	Fabrício Farias / Jaqueline Lima; Javier Pinilla / Javiera Islas	21; 6	21; 2

Brazil
5
Ginásio Univille
2 December 2021, 17:00 UTC−3

Paraguay
0

			1	2	3
1	(Brazil) (Paraguay)	Fabrício Farias / Jaqueline Lima; Kentaro Asoh / Camila Alvarez	21; 11	21; 5
2	(Brazil) (Paraguay)	Juliana Viana Vieira; Cecilia Haneman	21; 9	21; 7
3	(Brazil) (Paraguay)	Fabrício Farias / Francielton Farias; Kentaro Asoh / Leo Lee	21; 11	21; 13
4	(Brazil) (Paraguay)	Bianca de Oliveira Lima / Tamires dos Santos; Camila Alvarez / Cecilia Haneman	21; 10	21; 11
5	(Brazil) (Paraguay)	Waleson dos Santos; Kentaro Asoh	21; 12	21; 18

Ecuador
3
Ginásio Univille
2 December 2021, 17:00 UTC−3

Argentina
2

			1	2	3
1	(Ecuador) (Argentina)	Alan Erben; Mateo Maira	21; 12	21; 15
2	(Ecuador) (Argentina)	Maria Delia Zambrano; Yovela Petrucci	21; 7	21; 16
3	(Ecuador) (Argentina)	Emilio Zambrano / Henry Huebla; Mateo Maira / Santiago Otero	17; 21	15; 21
4	(Ecuador) (Argentina)	Brittany Navarrete / Melanie Mandich Tumbaco; Ailen Oliva / Yovela Petrucci	8; 21	10; 21
5	(Ecuador) (Argentina)	Alan Erben / Maria Delia Zambrano; Santiago Otero / Ailen Oliva	21; 18	21; 11

Chile
2
Ginásio Univille
3 December 2021, 09:00 UTC−3

Ecuador
3

			1	2	3
1	(Chile) (Ecuador)	Fernando Sanhueza; Alan Erben	12; 21	18; 21
2	(Chile) (Ecuador)	Belén Troncoso; Maria Delia Zambrano	4; 21	15; 21
3	(Chile) (Ecuador)	Cristián Araya / Benjamín Bahamondez; Henry Huebla / Emilio Zambrano	21; 17	21; 14
4	(Chile) (Ecuador)	Belén Troncoso / Constanza Naranjo; Brittany Navarrete / Melanie Mandich Tumbaco	21; 11	21; 10
5	(Chile) (Ecuador)	Cristián Araya / Constanza Naranjo; Alan Erben / Maria Delia Zambrano	22; 20	14; 21	12; 21

Argentina
5
Ginásio Univille
3 December 2021, 09:00 UTC−3

Paraguay
0

			1	2	3
1	(Argentina) (Paraguay)	Ailen Oliva / Yovela Petrucci; Camila Alvarez / Cecilia Haneman	23; 21	21; 14
2	(Argentina) (Paraguay)	Mateo Maira / Santiago Otero; Kentaro Asoh / Leo Lee	21; 15	21; 15
3	(Argentina) (Paraguay)	Ailen Oliva; Camila Alvarez	21; 11	21; 14
4	(Argentina) (Paraguay)	Mateo Maira / Yovela Petrucci; Kentaro Asoh / Cecilia Haneman	21; 19	21; 15
5	(Argentina) (Paraguay)	Santiago Otero; Kentaro Asoh	21; 16	21; 13

Chile
-
Ginásio Univille
4 December 2021, 09:00 UTC−3

Paraguay
Withdrew

		1	2	3
1	(Chile) (Paraguay)
2	(Chile) (Paraguay)
3	(Chile) (Paraguay)
4	(Chile) (Paraguay)
5	(Chile) (Paraguay)

Brazil
5
Ginásio Univille
4 December 2021, 09:00 UTC−3

Argentina
0

			1	2	3
1	(Brazil) (Argentina)	Juliana Viana Vieira; Martina Arnold	21; 4	21; 7
2	(Brazil) (Argentina)	Jonathan Matias; Santiago Otero	21; 5	22; 7
3	(Brazil) (Argentina)	Jaqueline Lima / Sâmia Lima; Martina Arnold / Ailen Oliva	21; 11	21; 2
4	(Brazil) (Argentina)	Izak Batalha / Artur Silva Pomoceno; Sebastian Contró / Santiago Otero	21; 6	21; 19
5	(Brazil) (Argentina)	Fabrício Farias / Jaqueline Lima; Franco Motto / Yovela Petrucci	21; 6	21; 8
