= 2024 South American Badminton Championships =

Tournament details
- Dates: 10–14 December
- Edition: 19th
- Venue: Centro de Entrenamiento Olimpico
- Location: Santiago, Chile

The 2024 South American Badminton Championships (Spanish: Campeonato Sudamericano Adulto de Badminton 2024) was a badminton tournament sanctioned by the South American Badminton Confederation and Badminton Pan America. The individual and mixed team events were held from 10 to 14 December 2024.

The tournament was held at Centro de Entrenamiento Olimpico in Santiago, Chile. This was the second time Chile hosted the championships since the 2013 edition in Temuco. Six countries took part in the tournament.

In the team event, Peru regained the title after defeating Brazil 3–1 in the final while hosts Chile beat Argentina 3–2 in the third place play-off.

== Medal summary ==
=== Medalists ===
| Event | Gold | Silver | Bronze |
|---|---|---|---|
| Men's singles | (Brazil) Welton Menezes | (Peru) Adriano Viale | (Brazil) Mateus Cutti |
| Men's singles | (Brazil) Welton Menezes | (Peru) Adriano Viale | (Brazil) Gabriel Cury |
| Women's singles | (Peru) Namie Miyahira | (Colombia) Juliana Giraldo | (Peru) Inés Castillo |
| Women's singles | (Peru) Namie Miyahira | (Colombia) Juliana Giraldo | (Peru) Fernanda Saponara |
| Men's doubles | (Brazil) Mateus Cutti (Brazil) Alisson Vasconcellos | (Brazil) Gabriel Cury (Brazil) Rafael Faria | (Brazil) Enzo Sugiura (Brazil) Pedro Taveira |
| Men's doubles | (Brazil) Mateus Cutti (Brazil) Alisson Vasconcellos | (Brazil) Gabriel Cury (Brazil) Rafael Faria | (Peru) Sharum Durand (Peru) José Guevara |
| Women's doubles | (Peru) Fernanda Munar (Peru) Rafaela Munar | (Argentina) Iona Gualdi (Argentina) Ailén Oliva | (Colombia) Juliana Giraldo (Colombia) Karen Patiño |
| Women's doubles | (Peru) Fernanda Munar (Peru) Rafaela Munar | (Argentina) Iona Gualdi (Argentina) Ailén Oliva | (Peru) Inés Castillo (Peru) Namie Miyahira |
| Mixed doubles | (Brazil) Donnians Oliveira (Brazil) Ana Julia Ywata | (Peru) Adriano Viale (Peru) Fernanda Saponara | (Peru) Sharum Durand (Peru) Namie Miyahira |
| Mixed doubles | (Brazil) Donnians Oliveira (Brazil) Ana Julia Ywata | (Peru) Adriano Viale (Peru) Fernanda Saponara | (Peru) Diego Subauste (Peru) Rafaela Munar |
| Mixed team | Peru | Brazil | Chile |

=== Medal table ===
* Host nation (Chile)

| Rank | Nation | Gold | Silver | Bronze | Total |
|---|---|---|---|---|---|
| 1 | Peru | 3 | 2 | 6 | 11 |
| 2 | Brazil | 3 | 2 | 3 | 8 |
| 3 | Colombia | 0 | 1 | 1 | 2 |
| 4 | Argentina | 0 | 1 | 0 | 1 |
| 5 | Chile* | 0 | 0 | 1 | 1 |
| Totals (5 entries) | | 6 | 6 | 11 | 23 |

== Team event ==
=== Group stage ===
==== Group A ====
| Pos | Team | Pld | W | L | MF | MA | MD | GF | GA | GD | PF | PA | PD | Pts | Qualification |
|---|---|---|---|---|---|---|---|---|---|---|---|---|---|---|---|
| 1 | Brazil | 1 | 1 | 0 | 4 | 1 | +3 | 9 | 3 | +6 | 243 | 174 | +69 | 1 | Knockout stage |
| 2 | Argentina | 1 | 0 | 1 | 1 | 4 | −3 | 3 | 9 | −6 | 174 | 243 | −69 | 0 | Knockout stage |
| 3 | Paraguay | 0 | 0 | 0 | 0 | 0 | 0 | 0 | 0 | 0 | 0 | 0 | 0 | 0 | Withdrew |

Source: TournamentSoftware.com

Brazil
-
Centro de Entrenamiento Olimpico, Court 1
10 December 2024, 14:30 UTC−4

Paraguay
Withdrew

| | | | 1 | 2 | 3 |
|---|---|---|---|---|---|---|
| 1 | (Brazil) (Paraguay) | Marcos Ryan Sousa / Julia Viana Vieira; Josias Haneman / Paula Rodas Navarro | | | | w/o |
| 2 | (Brazil) (Paraguay) | Jackeline Luz / Ana Julia Ywata; Paula Rodas Navarro / Sofia Rodas Navarro | | | | w/o |
| 3 | (Brazil) (Paraguay) | Donnians Oliveira; Leo Lee | | | | w/o |
| 4 | (Brazil) (Paraguay) | Ana Julia Ywata; Sofia Rodas Navarro | | | | w/o |
| 5 | (Brazil) (Paraguay) | Mateus Cutti / Alisson Vasconcellos; Jordan Lee / Leo Lee | | | | w/o |

Brazil
4
Centro de Entrenamiento Olimpico, Court 2
10 December 2024, 18:30 UTC−4

Argentina
1

| | | | 1 | 2 | 3 |
|---|---|---|---|---|---|
| 1 | (Brazil) (Argentina) | Marcos Ryan Sousa / Julia Viana Vieira; Franco Motto / Ailén Oliva | 21; 10 | 21; 12 |
| 2 | (Brazil) (Argentina) | Donnians Oliveira; Santiago Liotini | 21; 10 | 21; 7 |
| 3 | (Brazil) (Argentina) | Ana Julia Ywata; Iona Gualdi | 21; 13 | 20; 22 | 21; 14 |
| 4 | (Brazil) (Argentina) | Mateus Cutti / Alisson Vasconcellos; Franco Motto / Serafín Zayas | 21; 15 | 21; 11 |
| 5 | (Brazil) (Argentina) | Jackeline Luz / Ana Julia Ywata; Iona Gualdi / Ailén Oliva | 17; 21 | 21; 18 | 17; 21 |

Paraguay
Withdrew
Centro de Entrenamiento Olimpico, Court 1
11 December 2024, 09:00 UTC−4

Argentina
-

| | | 1 | 2 | 3 |
|---|---|---|---|---|
| 1 | (Paraguay) (Argentina) |
| 2 | (Paraguay) (Argentina) |
| 3 | (Paraguay) (Argentina) |
| 4 | (Paraguay) (Argentina) |
| 5 | (Paraguay) (Argentina) |

==== Group B ====
| Pos | Team | Pld | W | L | MF | MA | MD | GF | GA | GD | PF | PA | PD | Pts | Qualification |
|---|---|---|---|---|---|---|---|---|---|---|---|---|---|---|---|
| 1 | Peru | 2 | 2 | 0 | 10 | 0 | +10 | 20 | 1 | +19 | 441 | 249 | +192 | 2 | Knockout stage |
| 2 | Chile (H) | 2 | 1 | 1 | 4 | 6 | −2 | 8 | 13 | −5 | 345 | 366 | −21 | 1 | Knockout stage |
| 3 | Colombia | 2 | 0 | 2 | 1 | 9 | −8 | 4 | 18 | −14 | 277 | 448 | −171 | 0 | |

Source: TournamentSoftware.com
(H) Host

Peru
5
Centro de Entrenamiento Olimpico, Court 2
10 December 2024, 14:30 UTC−4

Colombia
0

| | | | 1 | 2 | 3 |
|---|---|---|---|---|---|
| 1 | (Peru) (Colombia) | José Guevara / Fernanda Saponara; Fabián Rodríguez / Karen Patiño | 21; 18 | 21; 11 |
| 2 | (Peru) (Colombia) | Adriano Viale; Nicolás Morales | 21; 3 | 21; 9 |
| 3 | (Peru) (Colombia) | Fernanda Munar; María Yulieth Pérez | 21; 10 | 21; 8 |
| 4 | (Peru) (Colombia) | Sharum Durand / José Guevara; Nicolás Morales / Fabián Rodríguez | 21; 10 | 21; 8 |
| 5 | (Peru) (Colombia) | Namie Miyahira / Rafaela Munar; Juliana Giraldo / Karen Patiño | 21; 14 | 19; 21 | 21; 10 |

Peru
5
Centro de Entrenamiento Olimpico, Court 1
10 December 2024, 18:30 UTC−4

Chile
0

| | | | 1 | 2 | 3 |
|---|---|---|---|---|---|
| 1 | (Peru) (Chile) | Fernanda Saponara; Vania Diaz | 21; 14 | 23; 21 |
| 2 | (Peru) (Chile) | Sharum Durand; Nicolás Monné | 21; 9 | 21; 5 |
| 3 | (Peru) (Chile) | Fernanda Munar / Rafaela Munar; Chou Ting Ting / Camila Macaya | 21; 7 | 21; 10 |
| 4 | (Peru) (Chile) | Brian Roque / Diego Subauste; Nicolás Morales / Fabián Rodríguez | 21; 19 | 21; 15 |
| 5 | (Peru) (Chile) | Sharum Durand / Namie Miyahira; Fernando Sanhueza / Chou Ting Ting | 21; 14 | 21; 12 |

Colombia
1
Centro de Entrenamiento Olimpico, Court 1
11 December 2024, 09:00 UTC−4

Chile
4

| | | | 1 | 2 | 3 |
|---|---|---|---|---|---|---|
| 1 | (Colombia) (Chile) | Fabián Rodríguez / Karen Patiño; Cristián Araya / Vania Diaz | 13; 21 | 11; 21 |
| 2 | (Colombia) (Chile) | Nicolás Morales; Fernando Sanhueza | 17; 21 | 21; 18 | 18; 21 |
| 3 | (Colombia) (Chile) | Juliana Giraldo; Ashley Montre | 21; 16 | 21; 17 |
| 4 | (Colombia) (Chile) | Nicolás Morales / Fabián Rodríguez; Cristián Araya / Sebastián Vásquez | | | | w/o |
| 5 | (Colombia) (Chile) | Karen Patiño / María Yulieth Pérez; Vania Diaz / Ashley Montre | 15; 21 | 17; 21 |

=== Knockout stage ===
==== Bracket ====
Semi-finals
Brazil | 3
Chile | 0
Argentina | 0
Peru | 3

Final
Brazil | 1
Peru | 3
Third place
Chile | 3
Argentina | 2

==== Semi-finals ====
Brazil
3
Centro de Entrenamiento Olimpico, Court 1
11 December 2024, 13:00 UTC−4

Chile
0

| | | | 1 | 2 | 3 |
|---|---|---|---|---|---|---|
| 1 | (Brazil) (Chile) | Marcos Ryan Sousa / Julia Viana Vieira; Martin Olmos / Valentina Rojas | 21; 8 | 21; 12 |
| 2 | (Brazil) (Chile) | Donnians Oliveira; Nicolás Monné | 21; 7 | 21; 5 |
| 3 | (Brazil) (Chile) | Ana Julia Ywata; Chou Ting Ting | 21; 13 | 21; 6 |
| 4 | (Brazil) (Chile) | Mateus Cutti / Alisson Vasconcellos; Bruno Mora / Sebastián Vásquez | | | | not played |
| 5 | (Brazil) (Chile) | Jackeline Luz / Ana Julia Ywata; Chou Ting Ting / Valentina Rojas | | | | not played |

Argentina
0
Centro de Entrenamiento Olimpico, Court 1
11 December 2024, 13:00 UTC−4

Peru
3

| | | | 1 | 2 | 3 |
|---|---|---|---|---|---|---|
| 1 | (Argentina) (Peru) | Santiago Liotini / Ailén Oliva; José Guevara / Namie Miyahira | 8; 21 | 12; 21 |
| 2 | (Argentina) (Peru) | Máximo Rettig; Sharum Durand | 10; 21 | 9; 21 |
| 3 | (Argentina) (Peru) | Milena Oliva; Inés Castillo | 6; 21 | 10; 21 |
| 4 | (Argentina) (Peru) | Santiago Liotini / Franco Motto; Brian Roque / Diego Subauste | | | | not played |
| 5 | (Argentina) (Peru) | Martina Espart / Morena Magistrati; Fernanda Munar / Rafaela Munar | | | | not played |

==== Third place play-off ====
Chile
3
Centro de Entrenamiento Olimpico, Court 1
11 December 2024, 09:30 UTC−4

Argentina
2

| | | | 1 | 2 | 3 |
|---|---|---|---|---|---|
| 1 | (Chile) (Argentina) | Cristián Araya / Vania Diaz; Serafín Zayas / Ailén Oliva | 14; 21 | 27; 25 | 20; 22 |
| 2 | (Chile) (Argentina) | Fernando Sanhueza; Franco Motto | 21; 14 | 21; 12 |
| 3 | (Chile) (Argentina) | Chou Ting Ting; Iona Gualdi | 9; 21 | 15; 21 |
| 4 | (Chile) (Argentina) | Cristián Araya / Sebastián Vásquez; Franco Motto / Serafín Zayas | 21; 19 | 21; 18 |
| 5 | (Chile) (Argentina) | Vania Diaz / Ashley Montre; Iona Gualdi / Ailén Oliva | 14; 21 | 21; 19 | 21; 17 |

==== Final ====
Brazil
1
Centro de Entrenamiento Olimpico, Court 1
11 December 2024, 09:30 UTC−4

Peru
3

| | | | 1 | 2 | 3 |
|---|---|---|---|---|---|---|
| 1 | (Brazil) (Peru) | Donnians Oliveira; Adriano Viale | 12; 21 | 21; 16 | 9; 21 |
| 2 | (Brazil) (Peru) | Ana Julia Ywata; Inés Castillo | 10; 21 | 5; 21 |
| 3 | (Brazil) (Peru) | Mateus Cutti / Alisson Vasconcellos; José Guevara / Diego Subauste | 21; 11 | 20; 22 | 21; 11 |
| 4 | (Brazil) (Peru) | Jackeline Luz / Ana Julia Ywata; Fernanda Munar / Rafaela Munar | 8; 21 | 8; 21 |
| 5 | (Brazil) (Peru) | Marcos Ryan Sousa / Julia Viana Vieira; José Guevara / Inés Castillo | | | | not played |
