= 2024 Thomas Cup qualification =

Tournament details
- Dates: 12 – 18 February 2024
- Venue: BA: Setia City Convention Centre; BCA: Cairo Stadium Hall 4 BE: Sport Arena in Łódź; BO: Badminton Geelong; BPA: Centro Paralímpico Brasilero
- Location: BA: Selangor, Malaysia; BCA: Cairo, Egypt; BE: Łódź, Poland; BO: Geelong, Australia; BPA: São Paulo, Brazil

The 2024 Thomas Cup qualification process is a series of tournaments organised by the five BWF confederations to decide 14 of the 16 teams which will play in the 2024 Thomas Cup, with China qualifying automatically as hosts, India qualifying automatically as trophy holder.

== Qualification process ==
The number of teams participating in the final tournament is 16. The allocation of slots for each confederation is the same allocation from 2016 tournament; 4 from each Asia and Europe, and 1 from each Africa, Oceania and Pan Am. Two automatic qualifiers are the host and defending champion. The remaining quota will be filled by world team ranking.

=== Qualified teams ===
Country	Confederation	Qualified as	Qualified on	World Team Rankings	Final appearance
China	Badminton Asia	Host country	28 November 2021	1	22nd
India	Badminton Asia	2022 Thomas Cup winners	15 May 2022	6	14th
Algeria	Badminton Africa	2024 All Africa Championships winners	15 February 2024	32	4th
Malaysia	Badminton Asia	2024 Asia Championships runner-up	18 February 2024	5	30th
Japan	Badminton Asia	2024 Asia Championships semifinalists	17 February 2024	4	17th
South Korea	Badminton Asia	2024 Asia Championships semifinalists	17 February 2024	8	21st
Canada	Badminton Pan Am	2024 Pan Am Cup winners	18 February 2024	11	9th
Denmark	Badminton Europe	2024 European Championships winner	18 February 2024	2	33rd
France	Badminton Europe	2024 European Championships runner-up	18 February 2024	9	6th
England	Badminton Europe	2024 European Championships semifinalists	17 February 2024	15	16th
Germany	Badminton Europe	2024 European Championships semifinalists	17 February 2024	14	12th
Australia	Badminton Oceania	2024 Oceania Championships winner	22 February 2022	33	5th
Indonesia	Badminton Asia	Best ranking (Asia) ^{1}	18 February 2024	3	29th
Thailand	Badminton Asia	Best ranking (overall)	18 February 2024	10	16th
Chinese Taipei	Badminton Asia	Best ranking (overall)	18 February 2024	7	6th
Hong Kong	Badminton Asia	Best ranking (overall)	18 February 2024	12	6th

- ^1 Since China, winner for Asian qualification tournament had already qualified as title holder, hence the spot is given to the best Asian team from World Team Ranking.

== Confederation qualification ==
=== Badminton Confederation of Africa ===
The qualification for the African teams was held from 12 to 15 February 2024, at the Cairo Stadium Hall 4, in Cairo, Egypt. The winners of the African qualification will qualified for the Thomas Cup.

==== Teams in contention ====
Teams qualified for the Group stage

- Algeria
- Cameroon
- Egypt
- Mauritius
- Nigeria
- South Africa
- Uganda
- Zambia

==== First round (group stage) ====
Advance to Knockout stage

Group A

Pos	Team	Pld	Pts
1	Algeria	3	3
2	Egypt (H)	3	2
3	Zambia	3	1
4	Uganda	3	0

Source: TS
(H) Host
Group B

Pos	Team	Pld	Pts
1	Nigeria	3	3
2	Mauritius	3	2
3	South Africa	3	1
4	Cameroon	3	0

Source: TS

==== Second round (knockout stage) ====
Semi-finals
14 February 18:00
Algeria	3
Mauritius	1
14 February 18:00
Egypt	2
Nigeria	3

Final
15 February 15:00
Algeria	3
Nigeria	2

=== Badminton Asia ===
The qualification for the Asian teams was held from 13 to 18 February 2024, at the Setia City Convention Centre in Shah Alam, Selangor, Malaysia. The semifinalist of the Asian qualification will qualified for the Thomas Cup. India qualified automatically as trophy holder .

==== Teams in contention ====
Teams qualified for the Group stage

- Brunei
- China
- Chinese Taipei
- Hong Kong
- India
- Indonesia
- Japan
- Kazakhstan
- Malaysia
- Myanmar
- Saudi Arabia
- Singapore
- South Korea
- Thailand
- United Arab Emirates

==== First round (group stage) ====
Advance to Knockout stage

Group A
Group B

Pos	Team	Pld	Pts
1	China	2	2
2	India	2	1
3	Hong Kong	2	0

Pos	Team	Pld	Pts
1	Malaysia	3	3
2	Chinese Taipei	3	2
3	Kazakhstan	3	1
4	Brunei	3	0

Group C
Group D

Pos	Team	Pld	Pts
1	Japan	3	3
2	Singapore	3	2
3	Thailand	3	1
4	Myanmar	3	0

Pos	Team	Pld	Pts
1	South Korea	3	3
2	Indonesia	3	2
3	United Arab Emirates	3	1
4	Saudi Arabia	3	0

==== Second round (knockout stage) ====
Quarter-finals
16 February 16:00
China (1)	3
Indonesia (2)	2
16 February 16:00
South Korea	3
Chinese Taipei	2
16 February 16:00
Singapore	1
Malaysia (4)	3
16 February 16:00
India	2
Japan (3)	3

Semi-finals
17 February 16:00
China (1)	3
South Korea	2
17 February 16:00
Malaysia (4)	3
Japan (3)	1

Final
18 February 16:00
China (1)	3
Malaysia (4)	0

=== Badminton Europe ===
The qualification for the European teams was held from 14 to 18 February 2024, at the Sport Arena Łódź in Łódź, Poland. The semifinalist of the European qualification will qualified for the Thomas Cup.

==== Teams in contention ====
Teams qualified for the Group stage

- Czech Republic
- Denmark
- England
- France
- Germany
- Netherlands
- Poland
- Ukraine

Teams failed to qualify for the Group stage

- Austria
- Azerbaijan
- Belgium
- Bulgaria
- Estonia
- Finland
- Greenland
- Hungary
- Iceland
- Ireland
- Israel
- Italy
- Latvia
- Malta
- Norway
- Portugal
- Scotland
- Slovakia
- Slovenia
- Spain
- Sweden
- Switzerland

==== First round (group stage) ====
Advance to Knockout stage

Group 1

Pos	Team	Pld	Pts
1	Denmark	3	3
2	Germany	3	2
3	Poland (H)	3	1
4	Czech Republic	3	0

Source: TS
(H) Host
Group 2

Pos	Team	Pld	Pts
1	France	3	3
2	England	3	2
3	Netherlands	3	1
4	Ukraine	3	0

Source: TS

==== Second round (knockout stage) ====
Semi-finals
17 February 15:00
Denmark	3
Germany	0
17 February 15:00
England	0
France	3

Final
18 February 15:00
Denmark	3
France	0

=== Badminton Oceania ===
The qualification for the Oceanian teams was held from 16 to 18 February 2024, at the Badminton Geelong in Geelong, Australia. The winner of the Oceania qualification qualified for the Thomas Cup.

==== Teams in contention ====
- Australia
- Cook Islands
- Fiji
- New Zealand
- Tahiti

==== Round-robin ====
Pos	Team	Pld	W	L	MF	MA	MD	GF	GA	GD	PF	PA	PD	Pts	Qualification
1	Australia (H)	4	4	0	19	1	+18	39	3	+36	878	384	+494	4	Thomas Cup
2	New Zealand	4	3	1	16	4	+12	33	9	+24	831	487	+344	3	
3	Tahiti	4	2	2	7	13	−6	16	27	−11	616	766	−150	2	
4	Cook Islands	4	1	3	5	15	−10	10	32	−22	438	800	−362	1	
5	Fiji	4	0	4	3	17	−14	8	35	−27	527	853	−326	0	

Source: TS
(H) Host

=== Badminton Pan Am ===
The qualification for the Pan Am teams was held from 15 to 18 February 2024, at the Centro Paralimpico Brasílero in São Paulo, Brazil. The winner of the Pan Am qualification qualified for the Thomas Cup.

==== Teams in contention ====
Teams qualified for the Group stage

- Brazil
- Canada
- El Salvador
- Guatemala
- Mexico
- Paraguay
- Peru
- United States

==== First round (group stage) ====
Advance to Semi-finals

Group A

Pos	Team	Pld	Pts
1	Canada	3	3
2	Guatemala	3	2
3	Peru	3	1
4	El Salvador	3	0

Source: TS
Group B

Pos	Team	Pld	Pts
1	Brazil (H)	3	3
2	Mexico	3	2
3	United States	3	1
4	Paraguay	3	0

Source: TS
(H) Host

==== Second round (knockout stage) ====
Semi-finals
16 February
Canada	3
Mexico	0
16 February
Guatemala
Brazil	w/o

Final
17 February
Canada	3
Brazil	0
Third place
17 February
Mexico	w/o
Guatemala

== World team rankings ==
Below is the chart of the BWF World Team Ranking calculated by adding World Ranking points of top three Men's Singles players and top two Men's Doubles pairs on 20 February 2024.

Key

- QS – Qualification stage
- GS – Group stage
- SG – Subgroup

Rank	Conf.	Nation	Points	Continental results	Host	Title holder	Continental qualifier	Ranking qualifier
1	BA	China	405,911	Winner	Host		~~Asia~~	
2	BE	Denmark	370,148	Winner			Europe	
3	BA	Indonesia	350,429	Quarter-finalist				Asia WR
4	BA	Japan	345,532	Semi-finalist			Asia	
5	BA	Malaysia	323,096	Finalist			Asia	
6	BA	India	314,992	Quarter-finalist		Holder		
7	BA	Chinese Taipei	290,476	Quarter-finalist				World ranking
8	BA	South Korea	205,764	Semi-finalist			Asia	
9	BE	France	200,041	Finalist			Europe	
10	BA	Thailand	195,281	3rd in GS				World ranking
11	BPA	Canada	162,527	Winner			Pan America	
12	BA	Hong Kong	156,084	3rd in GS				World ranking
13	BA	Singapore	144,194	Quarter-finalist				
14	BE	Germany	132,535	Semi-finalist			Europe	
15	BE	England	112,671	Semi-finalist			Europe	
16	BPA	United States	108,582	5th place				
17	BPA	Brazil	106,897	2nd place				
18	BPA	Mexico	84,993	3rd place				
19	BE	Netherlands	84,677	3rd in GS				
20	BE	Czech Republic	79,294	4th in GS				
21	BE	Scotland	77,174	2nd in QS SG				
22	BPA	Guatemala	76,225	4th place				
23	BE	Spain	73,268	2nd in QS GS				
24	BE	Italy	72,462	2nd in QS GS				
25	BE	Ireland	68,291	2nd in QS SG				
26	BE	Finland	64,501	2nd in QS GS				
27	BE	Israel	59,605	2nd in QS SG				
30	BE	Austria	55,002	2nd in QS SG				
31	BE	Belgium	53,453	QS finalist				
32	BCA	Algeria	53,437	Winner			Africa	
33	BO	Australia	52,980	Winner			Oceania	
34	BA	United Arab Emirates	51,328	3rd in GS				
35	BE	Switzerland	48,940	3rd in QS GS				
36	BE	Azerbaijan	48,012	QS finalist				
37	BE	Poland	46,940	3rd in GS				
38	BPA	El Salvador	46,466	7th place				
39	BE	Norway	42,558	3rd in QS SG				
40	BE	Sweden	42,526	2nd in QS GS				
41	BPA	Peru	40,134	6th place				
42	BCA	Mauritius	40,024	Semi-finalist				
43	BCA	Nigeria	35,756	Finalist				
45	BE	Bulgaria	33,677	3rd in QS GS				
47	BA	Kazakhstan	32,337	3rd in GS				
48	BE	Ukraine	31,894	4th in GS				
49	BO	New Zealand	31,196	2nd place				
51	BCA	South Africa	30,273	3rd in GS				
52	BCA	Egypt	27,272	Semi-finalist				
53	BE	Hungary	23,790	3rd in QS GS				
56	BCA	Uganda	22,243	4th in GS				
57	BE	Portugal	22,157	3rd in QS SG				
59	BE	Estonia	21,637	3rd in QS GS				
61	BPA	Paraguay	18,380	8th place				
65	BE	Slovenia	16,518	4th in QS GS				
67	BCA	Zambia	15,829	3rd in GS				
69	BE	Slovakia	15,088	3rd in QS SG				
70	BA	Saudi Arabia	14,226	4th in GS				
71	BE	Malta	14,156	4th in QS GS				
74	BA	Myanmar	12,378	3rd in GS				
77	BE	Iceland	10,978	4th in QS GS				
79	BCA	Cameroon	9,326	4th in GS				
81	BA	Brunei	8,346	4th in GS				
99	BO	Tahiti	3,812	3rd place				
101	BO	Cook Islands	3,609	4th place				
109	BO	Fiji	1,861	5th place				
120	BE	Greenland	428	3rd in QS SG				
121	BE	Latvia	364	4th in QS GS				
