= 2019 South American Badminton Championships =

Tournament details
- Dates: 21–30 November
- Edition: 14th
- Venue: Coliseo Abel Jimenez Parra
- Location: Guayaquil, Ecuador

The 2019 South American Badminton Championships (Spanish: Campeonato Sudamericano Adulto de Badminton 2019) was a badminton tournament sanctioned by the South American Badminton Confederation and Badminton Pan America. The individual and mixed team events were held from 21 to 30 November 2019.

The tournament was held at Coliseo Abel Jimenez Parra located in Guayaquil, Ecuador. Six countries took part in the tournament.

In the team event, reigning champions Peru defeated Brazil 3–2 in the final. In the third place play-off, Argentina defeated Chile to win bronze.

== Medal summary ==
=== Medalists ===
Event	Gold	Silver	Bronze
Men's singles	(Brazil) Artur Silva Pomoceno	(Brazil) Donnians Oliveira	(Peru) Nicolás Macías
Men's singles	(Brazil) Artur Silva Pomoceno	(Brazil) Donnians Oliveira	(Peru) Daniel la Torre Regal
Women's singles	(Peru) Daniela Macías	(Peru) Fernanda Saponara	(Brazil) Jackeline Luz
Women's singles	(Peru) Daniela Macías	(Peru) Fernanda Saponara	(Peru) Inés Castillo
Men's doubles	(Peru) Diego Subauste (Peru) Daniel la Torre Regal	(Peru) José Guevara (Peru) Diego Mini	(Chile) Cristián Araya (Chile) Iván León
Men's doubles	(Peru) Diego Subauste (Peru) Daniel la Torre Regal	(Peru) José Guevara (Peru) Diego Mini	(Brazil) Mateus Cutti (Brazil) Alisson Vasconcellos
Women's doubles	(Peru) Daniela Macías (Peru) Dánica Nishimura	(Brazil) Monaliza Feitosa (Brazil) Lorena Vieira	(Brazil) Mariana Pedrol Freitas (Brazil) Bianca de Oliveira Lima
Women's doubles	(Peru) Daniela Macías (Peru) Dánica Nishimura	(Brazil) Monaliza Feitosa (Brazil) Lorena Vieira	(Peru) Inés Castillo (Peru) Inés Mendoza
Mixed doubles	(Peru) Diego Mini (Peru) Dánica Nishimura	(Peru) Daniel la Torre Regal (Peru) Daniela Macías	(Brazil) Matheus Voigt (Brazil) Bianca de Oliveira Lima
Mixed doubles	(Peru) Diego Mini (Peru) Dánica Nishimura	(Peru) Daniel la Torre Regal (Peru) Daniela Macías	(Peru) José Guevara (Peru) Inés Castillo
Mixed team	Peru; José Guevara; Nicolás Macías; Diego Mini; Santiago de la Oliva; Diego Subauste; Daniel la Torre Regal; Inés Castillo; Daniela Macías; Inés Mendoza; Dánica Nishimura; Fernanda Saponara	Brazil; João Bajer; Jonatas Carvalho; Felipe Cury; Mateus Cutti; Igor Ibrahim; Marcelo Bosa Oliveira; Alisson Vasconcellos; Matheus Voigt; Jeisiane Alves; Monaliza Feitosa; Mariana Pedrol Freitas; Bianca de Oliveira Lima; Jackeline Luz; Rosalina de Souza; Lorena Vieira	Argentina; Sebastián Contro; Mateo Delmastro; Mateo Maira; Nicolas Oliva; Santiago Otero; Iona Gualdi; Ailén Oliva; Yovela Petrucci

=== Medal table ===
* Host nation (Ecuador)

Rank	Nation	Gold	Silver	Bronze	Total
1	Peru	5	3	5	13
2	Brazil	1	3	4	8
3	Argentina	0	0	1	1
3	Chile	0	0	1	1
Totals (4 entries)		6	6	11	23

== Team event ==
=== Group stage ===
==== Group A ====
Pos	Team	Pld	W	L	MF	MA	MD	GF	GA	GD	PF	PA	PD	Pts	Qualification
1	Peru	2	2	0	10	0	+10	20	0	+20	420	208	+212	2	Knockout stage
2	Argentina	2	1	1	3	7	−4	6	15	−9	306	398	−92	1	Knockout stage
3	Ecuador (H)	2	0	2	2	8	−6	5	16	−11	289	409	−120	0	

Source: TS
(H) Host

Peru
5
Coliseo Abel Jimenez Parra, Court 3
25 November 2019, 09:00 UTC−5

Ecuador
0

			1	2	3
1	(Peru) (Ecuador)	Daniel la Torre Regal; Joseph Rodriguez	21; 9	21; 16
2	(Peru) (Ecuador)	Daniela Macías; Natalia Roman	21; 5	21; 6
3	(Peru) (Ecuador)	José Guevara / Diego Subauste; Andy Baque / Emilio Zambrano	21; 13	21; 10
4	(Peru) (Ecuador)	Inés Castillo / Inés Mendoza; Nayeli Mite / Natalia Roman	21; 15	21; 12
5	(Peru) (Ecuador)	Diego Mini / Dánica Nishimura; Joseph Rodriguez / Melanie Huebla	21; 9	21; 6

Ecuador
2
Coliseo Abel Jimenez Parra, Court 3
25 November 2019, 13:00 UTC−5

Argentina
3

			1	2	3
1	(Ecuador) (Argentina)	Joseph Rodriguez / Natalia Roman; Santiago Otero / Ailén Oliva	14; 21	14; 21
2	(Ecuador) (Argentina)	Andy Baque; Nicolas Oliva	14; 21	21; 11	20; 22
3	(Ecuador) (Argentina)	Maria Delia Zambrano; Iona Gualdi	21; 16	21; 18
4	(Ecuador) (Argentina)	Joseph Rodriguez / Emilio Zambrano; Nicolas Oliva / Santiago Otero	7; 21	14; 21
5	(Ecuador) (Argentina)	Natalia Roman / Maria Delia Zambrano; Ailén Oliva / Yovela Petrucci	21; 16	21; 11

Peru
5
Coliseo Abel Jimenez Parra, Court 1
25 November 2019, 17:00 UTC−5

Argentina
0

			1	2	3
1	(Peru) (Argentina)	Diego Mini / Dánica Nishimura; Mateo Maira / Iona Gualdi	21; 9	21; 12
2	(Peru) (Argentina)	Daniel la Torre Regal; Mateo Delmastro	21; 15	21; 14
3	(Peru) (Argentina)	Inés Castillo; Ailén Oliva	21; 11	21; 10
4	(Peru) (Argentina)	José Guevara / Diego Mini; Sebastián Contro / Mateo Delmastro	21; 12	21; 10
5	(Peru) (Argentina)	Daniela Macías / Dánica Nishimura; Ailén Oliva / Yovela Petrucci	21; 6	21; 8

=== Group B ===
Pos	Team	Pld	W	L	MF	MA	MD	GF	GA	GD	PF	PA	PD	Pts	Qualification
1	Brazil	2	2	0	9	1	+8	18	2	+16	423	308	+115	2	Knockout stage
2	Chile	2	1	1	4	6	−2	8	13	−5	357	405	−48	1	Knockout stage
3	Colombia	2	0	2	2	8	−6	5	16	−11	345	412	−67	0	

Source: TS

Brazil
5
Coliseo Abel Jimenez Parra, Court 4
25 November 2019, 09:00 UTC−5

Colombia
0

			1	2	3
1	(Brazil) (Colombia)	Matheus Voigt / Bianca de Oliveira Lima; Jhon Berdugo / Laura Valentina Londoño	21; 14	21; 15
2	(Brazil) (Colombia)	Igor Ibrahim; Diego Alexander	21; 14	21; 11
3	(Brazil) (Colombia)	Jeisiane Alves; Juliana Giraldo	22; 20	21; 14
4	(Brazil) (Colombia)	Mateus Cutti / Alisson Vasconcellos; Jhon Berdugo / Dainne Marulanda Cano	21; 10	21; 12
5	(Brazil) (Colombia)	Mariana Pedrol Freitas / Jackeline Luz; Juliana Giraldo / Laura Valentina Londoño	24; 22	21; 17

Chile
3
Coliseo Abel Jimenez Parra, Court 4
25 November 2019, 13:00 UTC−5

Colombia
2

			1	2	3
1	(Chile) (Colombia)	Iván León; Dainne Marulanda Cano	21; 14	21; 16
2	(Chile) (Colombia)	Valentina Vasquez; Laura Valentina Londoño	20; 22	9; 21
3	(Chile) (Colombia)	Cristián Araya / Iván León; Nicolas Oliva / Santiago Otero	21; 11	21; 15
4	(Chile) (Colombia)	Camila Macaya / Belen Troncoso; Juliana Giraldo / Laura Valentina Londoño	15; 21	13; 21
5	(Chile) (Colombia)	Cristián Araya / Camila Macaya; Dainne Marulanda Cano / Juliana Giraldo	21; 14	14; 21	22; 20

Brazil
4
Coliseo Abel Jimenez Parra, Court 2
25 November 2019, 17:00 UTC−5

Chile
1

			1	2	3
1	(Brazil) (Chile)	Matheus Voigt / Mariana Pedrol Freitas; Cristián Araya / Camila Macaya	22; 20	21; 19
2	(Brazil) (Chile)	Mateus Cutti; Iván León	19; 21	21; 23
3	(Brazil) (Chile)	Jackeline Luz; Loreto Pontigo	21; 8	21; 9
4	(Brazil) (Chile)	Felipe Cury / Matheus Voigt; Cristián Araya / Iván León	21; 19	21; 16
5	(Brazil) (Chile)	Mariana Pedrol Freitas / Bianca de Oliveira Lima; Belen Troncoso / Valentina Vasquez	21; 7	21; 17

=== Knockout stage ===
==== Bracket ====
Semi-finals
1	Peru	3
3	Chile	0
4	Argentina	0
2	Brazil	3

Final
1	Peru	3
2	Brazil	2
Third place
3	Chile	0
4	Argentina	3

==== Semi-finals ====
Peru
3
Coliseo Abel Jimenez Parra, Court 1
26 November 2019, 09:00 UTC−5

Chile
0

			1	2	3
1	(Peru) (Chile)	José Guevara; Alonso Medel	21; 19	20; 22	21; 14
2	(Peru) (Chile)	Inés Castillo; Belen Troncoso	21; 6	21; 4
3	(Peru) (Chile)	Santiago de la Oliva / Diego Subauste; Cristóbal Conejero / Fernando Sanhueza	21; 13	21; 18
4	(Peru) (Chile)	Inés Mendoza / Fernanda Saponara; Javiera Islas / Valentina Vasquez				not played
5	(Peru) (Chile)	Daniel la Torre Regal / Daniela Macías; Cristóbal Conejero / Loreto Pontigo				not played

Brazil
3
Coliseo Abel Jimenez Parra, Court 2
26 November 2019, 09:00 UTC−5

Argentina
0

			1	2	3
1	(Brazil) (Argentina)	Alisson Vasconcellos; Mateo Delmastro	21; 11	21; 15
2	(Brazil) (Argentina)	Jeisiane Alves; Yovela Petrucci	21; 17	21; 6
3	(Brazil) (Argentina)	Felipe Cury / Matheus Voigt; Sebastián Contro / Mateo Delmastro	21; 11	21; 8
4	(Brazil) (Argentina)	Jackeline Luz / Bianca de Oliveira Lima; Ailén Oliva / Yovela Petrucci				not played
5	(Brazil) (Argentina)	Matheus Voigt / Mariana Pedrol Freitas; Mateo Maira / Iona Gualdi				not played

==== Third place play-off ====
Chile
0
Coliseo Abel Jimenez Parra, Court 1
26 November 2019, 14:00 UTC−5

Argentina
3

			1	2	3
1	(Chile) (Argentina)	Cristián Araya / Camila Macaya; Santiago Otero / Ailén Oliva	21; 9	19; 21	11; 21
2	(Chile) (Argentina)	Iván León; Nicolas Oliva	21; 14	17; 21	8; 21
3	(Chile) (Argentina)	Valentina Vasquez; Iona Gualdi	11; 21	15; 21
4	(Chile) (Argentina)	Cristián Araya / Iván León; Nicolas Oliva / Santiago Otero				not played
5	(Chile) (Argentina)	Camila Macaya / Belen Troncoso; Ailén Oliva / Yovela Petrucci				not played

=== Final ===
Brazil
3
Coliseo Abel Jimenez Parra, Court 2
26 November 2019, 14:00 UTC−5

Peru
2

			1	2	3
1	(Brazil) (Peru)	Matheus Voigt / Mariana Pedrol Freitas; Diego Mini / Dánica Nishimura	18; 21	17; 21
2	(Brazil) (Peru)	Alisson Vasconcellos; Daniel la Torre Regal	21; 15	21; 12
3	(Brazil) (Peru)	Jeisiane Alves; Daniela Macías	13; 21	10; 21
4	(Brazil) (Peru)	Felipe Cury / Matheus Voigt; José Guevara / Diego Mini	21; 15	22; 20
5	(Brazil) (Peru)	Mariana Pedrol Freitas / Bianca de Oliveira Lima; Daniela Macías / Dánica Nishimura	7; 21	14; 21
