= Paraguay national badminton team =

National badminton team representing Paraguay

Paraguay
- Association: Federación Paraguaya de Bádminton (FPB)
- Confederation: BPA (Pan America)
- President: Julio Lee

BWF ranking
- Current ranking: 113 ▲1 (2 April 2024)
- Highest ranking: 91 (3 January 2023)

Pan Am Men's Team Championships
- Appearances: 1 (first in 2024)
- Best result: Group stage

The Paraguay national badminton team (Spanish: Selección nacional de bádminton de Paraguay; Guarani: Aty tetãygua badminton Paraguái) represents Paraguay in international badminton team competitions. The national team is controlled and organized by the Paraguay Badminton Federation.

Badminton in Paraguay began to be practiced in 2012 following the formation of the national team and the establishment of the Paraguay Badminton Federation. At the time, the sport was widely played by the Chinese community in Ciudad del Este and in Chinese colleges in Asunción.

The team made their international debut in 2015, when they competed in the 2015 South American Badminton Championships mixed team event. The team made their first appearance at the Pan American Men's Team Championships in 2024.

== History ==
=== Men's team ===
In 2024, Paraguay made their first appearance at the Pan Am Male Badminton Cup. The team were drawn into Group B with Brazil, Mexico and the United States. The team were eliminated in the group stages after losing 5−0 to all three opponents. The team placed eighth in the competition after losing 3−0 to El Salvador in the seventh place playoff.

=== Mixed team ===
Paraguay first competed in the 2015 South American Badminton Championships mixed team event. The team finished in fourth place. In 2022, Paraguay made their debut in the South American Games mixed team event when it was granted qualification as host nation. The team was placed in Group A with Brazil and Ecuador but lost 5–0 to both teams and were eliminated in the group stages.

== Competitive record ==
=== Thomas Cup ===
Year	Round	Pos
1949 to 2022	Did not enter	
2024	Did not qualify	
2026	To be determined	
2028	To be determined	
2030	To be determined	

=== Uber Cup ===
Year	Round	Pos
1957 to 2024	Did not enter	
2026	To be determined	
2028	To be determined	
2030	To be determined	

=== Sudirman Cup ===
Year	Round	Pos
1989 to 2023	Did not enter	
2025	To be determined	
2027	To be determined	
2029	To be determined	

=== Pan American Team Championships ===
==== Men's team ====
Year	Round	Pos
2016 to 2022	Did not enter	
2024	Group stage	8th
2026	To be determined	
2028	To be determined	
2030	To be determined	

==== Women's team ====
Year	Round	Pos
2016 to 2024	Did not enter	
2026	To be determined	
2028	To be determined	
2030	To be determined	

==== Mixed team ====
Year	Round	Pos
1977 to 2023	Did not enter	
2025	To be determined	
2027	To be determined	
2029	To be determined	

=== South American Games ===
==== Mixed team ====
Year	Round	Pos
2010	Did not enter	
2018	Did not enter	
2022	Group stage	7th

=== South American Team Championships ===
==== Men's team ====
Year	Round	Pos
1985	Did not enter	
1990	Did not enter	

==== Women's team ====
Year	Round	Pos
1990	Did not enter	

==== Mixed team ====
Year	Round	Pos
1984 to 2014	Did not enter	
2015	Fourth place	4th
2016	Did not enter	
2017	Did not enter	
2018	Did not enter	
2019	Did not enter	
2020	Did not enter	
2022	Did not enter	
2023	Did not enter	

**Red border color indicates tournament was held on home soil.

== Junior competitive record ==
=== Suhandinata Cup ===
Year	Round	Pos
2000 to 2024	Did not enter	
2025	To be determined	

=== Pan American Junior Team Championships ===
==== Mixed team ====
Year	Round	Pos
1977 to 2024	Did not enter	
2025	Group stage	6th
2026	Group stage	5th

=== South American Junior Team Championships ===
==== Mixed team ====
Year	Round	Pos
1997 to 2023	Did not enter	

**Red border color indicates tournament was held on home soil.

== Staff ==
The following list shows the coaching staff for the national badminton team of Paraguay.

Name	Role
(Paraguay) Kentaro Asoh	Head coach

== Players ==
=== Current squad ===
As of 2 January 2024

==== Men's team ====
Name	DoB/Age	Ranking of event		
Name	DoB/Age	MS	MD	XD
Alejandro Ávalos	22 January 2005 (age 21)	834	-	1021
Julio Gonzáles	28 November 2002 (age 23)	-	-	-
Josias Haneman	9 November 2006 (age 19)	1444	-	-
Leo Lee	20 June 2002 (age 24)	231	-	-

==== Women's team ====
Name	DoB/Age	Ranking of event		
Name	DoB/Age	WS	WD	XD
Camila Álvarez	12 August 2002 (age 23)	-	-	-
Ana Amarilla	5 March 2005 (age 21)	-	-	-
Cecilla Haneman	6 February 2005 (age 21)	-	-	-

=== Previous squads ===
- South American Games: 2022
