= South American Badminton Championships =

Badminton championships

The South American Badminton Championships are a series of tournaments organized by the South American Badminton Confederation (CONSUBAD; Confederación Sudamericana de Bádminton) exclusively for South American badminton member countries to crown the best badminton players in South America. The inaugural edition of the tournament was held in 1984 in Buenos Aires, Argentina.

Member countries are Argentina, Brazil, Chile, Colombia, Ecuador, Guyana, French Guiana, Panama, Paraguay, Peru, Suriname, and Venezuela. Former member was Uruguay. The council of the CONSUBA is now headed by President Raimundo Lizama of Chile, supported by Vice-President Chung Lee Kao of Paraguay and Secretary Alejandro Almada of Argentina.

== Championships ==
Year	Edition	Host city	Events
1984	1	Buenos Aires, Argentina (1)	6
1985	2	Buenos Aires, Argentina (2)	3
1988	3	Montevideo, Uruguay (1)	6
1990	4	Mairinque, Brazil (1)	6
1996	5	Buenos Aires, Argentina (3)	6
1998	6	Campinas, Brazil (1)	6
2012	7	Lima, Peru (1)	6
2013	8	Temuco, Chile (1)	6
2014	9	São Paulo, Brazil (1)	6
2015	10	Foz do Iguaçu, Brazil (1)	6
2016	11	Lima, Peru (2)	6
2017	12	Rio de Janeiro, Brazil (1)	6
2018	13	Lima, Peru (3)	6
2019	14	Guayaquil, Ecuador (1)	6
2020	15	Lima, Peru (4)	6
2021	16	Joinville, Brazil (1)	6
2022	17	Lima, Peru (5)	6
2023	18	Maracay, Venezuela (1)	6
2024	19	Santiago, Chile (1)	6
2025	20	Bucaramanga, Colombia (1)	6

== All-time medal table ==
As of the 2024 South American Badminton Championships

Rank	NOC	Gold	Silver	Bronze	Total
1	Peru	62	52	65.5	179.5
2	Brazil	41	42	82	165
3	Chile	2	7	16	25
4	Colombia	1	1	4	6
5	Argentina	0	6	19	25
6	Suriname	0	1	1.5	2.5
7	Ecuador	0	1	1	2
8	Uruguay	0	0	1	1
8	Venezuela	0	0	1	1
Totals (9 entries)		106	110	191	407

== Past winners ==
=== Individual event ===
Year	Men's singles	Women's singles	Men's doubles	Women's doubles	Mixed doubles
1984	(Peru) Federico Valdez	(Peru) Silvia Jiménez	(Peru) Federico Valdez (Peru) German Valdez	(Peru) Gloria Jiménez (Peru) Ximena Bellido	(Peru) Gustavo Salazar (Peru) Gloria Jiménez
1985	(Brazil) Roy Ong Sioe Khing	Not held	(Brazil) Roy Ong Sioe Khing (Brazil) Luis Manuel Barreto	Not held	
1988	(Peru) Gustavo Salazar	(Peru) Ximena Bellido	(Peru) Gustavo Salazar (Peru) Federico Valdez	(Peru) Gloria Jiménez (Peru) Ximena Bellido	(Peru) Gustavo Salazar (Peru) Gloria Jiménez
1990	(Peru) Gustavo Salazar	(Peru) Teresa Montero	(Peru) Mario Carulla (Peru) Gustavo Salazar	(Peru) Gloria Jiménez (Peru) Silvia Jiménez	(Peru) Federico Valdez (Peru) Gloria Jiménez
1996	(Peru) Mario Carulla	(Peru) Lorena Blanco	(Peru) Mario Carulla (Peru) Gustavo Salazar	(Peru) Lorena Blanco (Peru) Ximena Bellido	(Peru) Gustavo Salazar (Peru) Lorena Blanco
1998	(Peru) Mario Carulla	(Peru) Lorena Blanco	(Peru) Mario Carulla (Peru) José Iturriaga	(Peru) Lorena Blanco (Peru) Ximena Bellido	(Peru) Guillermo Cox (Peru) Sandra Jimeno
2012	(Brazil) Daniel Paiola	(Brazil) Fabiana Silva	(Peru) Mario Cuba (Peru) Bruno Monteverde	(Brazil) Fabiana Silva (Brazil) Paula Pereira	(Brazil) Daniel Paiola (Brazil) Fabiana Silva
2013	(Peru) Andrés Corpancho	(Peru) Camila Duany	(Peru) Andrés Corpancho (Peru) Sebastián Macías	(Peru) Katherine Winder (Peru) Luz María Zornoza	(Peru) Andrés Corpancho (Peru) Daniela Macías
2014	(Chile) Cristián Araya	(Brazil) Mariana Pedrol Freitas	(Brazil) Francielton Farias (Brazil) Rodolfo Salles	(Brazil) Thalita Correa (Brazil) Mariana Pedrol Freitas	(Brazil) Francielton Farias (Brazil) Gabrielle Cavalcante
2015	(Brazil) Ygor Coelho	(Brazil) Fabiana Silva	(Brazil) Ygor Coelho (Brazil) Hugo Arthuso	(Brazil) Fabiana Silva (Brazil) Paula Pereira	(Brazil) Luíz dos Santos (Brazil) Ana Paula Campos
2016	(Peru) José Guevara	(Peru) Daniela Macías	(Chile) Bastian Lizama (Chile) Cristián Araya	(Peru) Luz María Zornoza (Peru) Paula la Torre	(Peru) Diego Mini (Peru) Luz María Zornoza
2017	(Brazil) Artur Pomoceno	(Peru) Daniela Macias	(Peru) Daniel la Torre (Peru) José Guevara	(Brazil) Marianna de Freitas (Brazil) Thalita Correa	(Brazil) Artur Pomoceno (Brazil) Lohaynny Vicente
2018	(Brazil) Artur Pomoceno	(Peru) Daniela Macias	(Brazil) Alisson Vasconcellos (Brazil) Mateus Cutti	(Peru) Daniela Macias (Peru) Dánica Nishimura	(Peru) Diego Mini (Peru) Paula la Torre
2019	(Brazil) Artur Pomoceno	(Peru) Daniela Macias	(Peru) Diego Subauste (Peru) Daniel la Torre	(Peru) Daniela Macias (Peru) Dánica Nishimura	(Peru) Diego Mini (Peru) Dánica Nishimura
2020	(Peru) Daniel la Torre	(Peru) Daniela Macias	(Peru) Diego Mini (Peru) José Guevara	(Peru) Daniela Macias (Peru) Dánica Nishimura	(Peru) Daniel la Torre (Peru) Paula la Torre
2021	(Brazil) Donnians Oliveira	(Brazil) Juliana Viana Vieira	(Brazil) Fabrício Farias (Brazil) Francielton Farias	(Brazil) Jaqueline Lima (Brazil) Sâmia Lima	(Brazil) Fabrício Farias (Brazil) Jaqueline Lima
2022	(Brazil) Donnians Oliveira	(Peru) Inés Castillo	(Peru) Diego Mini (Peru) José Guevara	(Brazil) Bianca Lima (Brazil) Lohaynny Vicente	(Peru) José Guevara (Peru) Inés Castillo
2023	(Brazil) Donnians Oliveira	(Colombia) Juliana Giraldo	(Brazil) Donnians Oliveira (Brazil) Matheus Voigt	(Brazil) Tamires dos Santos (Brazil) Ana Julia Ywata	(Brazil) Matheus Voigt (Brazil) Tamires dos Santos
2024	(Brazil) Welton Menezes	(Peru) Namie Miyahira	(Brazil) Mateus Cutti (Brazil) Alisson Vasconcellos	(Peru) Fernanda Munar (Peru) Rafaela Munar	(Brazil) Donnians Oliveira (Brazil) Ana Julia Ywata
2025	(Brazil) Donnians Oliveira	(Colombia) Juliana Giraldo	(Brazil) Renan Melo (Brazil) Donnians Oliveira	(Peru) Namie Miyahira (Peru) Sofia Junco	(Peru) Sharum Durand (Peru) Rafaela Munar

=== Team event ===
==== Men's team ====
Year	Champion	Runner-up	Bronze
1985	Brazil	Argentina	Uruguay
1990	Peru	Brazil	Argentina

==== Women's team ====
Year	Champion	Runner-up	Bronze
1990	Peru	Brazil	Argentina

==== Mixed team ====
Year	Champion	Runner-up	Bronze
1984	Peru	Argentina	Brazil
1988	Peru	Brazil	Argentina
1996	Peru	Brazil	Argentina
1998	Peru	Brazil	Suriname
2012	Brazil	Peru	Chile
2013	Peru	Chile	Argentina
2014	Brazil	Peru	Chile
2015	Brazil	Chile	Argentina
2016	Brazil	Peru	Chile
2017	Peru	Chile	Brazil
2018	Peru	Brazil	Chile
2019	Peru	Brazil	Argentina
2020	Peru	Argentina	Colombia
2021	Brazil	Ecuador	Argentina
2022	Peru	Brazil	Chile
2023	Brazil	Peru	Venezuela
2024	Peru	Brazil	Chile
2025	Peru	Brazil	Colombia
