= 2023 Pan Am Badminton Championships =

Tournament details
- Dates: 16–19 February (Team event); 26–29 April (Individual event)
- Edition: 26
- Venue: CODE Guadalajara (Team event); G.C. Foster College of Physical Education and Sport (Individual event)
- Location: Guadalajara, Mexico (Team event); Kingston, Jamaica (Individual event)

Champions
- Men's singles: (Canada) Brian Yang
- Women's singles: (Canada) Michelle Li
- Men's doubles: (Canada) Adam Dong (Canada) Nyl Yakura
- Women's doubles: (Canada) Catherine Choi (Canada) Josephine Wu
- Mixed doubles: (Canada) Joshua Hurlburt-Yu (Canada) Rachel Honderich

The XXVI 2023 Pan Am Badminton Championships was a continental championships tournament of badminton in Pan America. This tournament was held as two events in different countries. From 16 to 19 February, the team event was held in Guadalajara, Mexico. From 26 to 29 April, the individual event was held in Kingston, Jamaica.

== Tournament ==
The team event of 2023 Pan Am Badminton Championships officially Pan American Cup 2023, was a team continental championships tournament of badminton, to crown the best mixed team in Pan America, who would qualify to 2023 Sudirman Cup. This event was organized by the Badminton Pan Am and Federacion Mexicana de Badminton. Nine teams entered the tournament.

The individual event of Pan Am Badminton Championships was an individual continental championships tournament of badminton, to crowns the best male and female players and pairs in Pan America. The ranking points of this tournament equivalent to BWF World Tour Super 300 event. This event was organized by the Badminton Pan Am and Jamaica Badminton Association.

=== Venue ===
- The team event was held at Centro de Alto CODE Guadalajara in Guadalajara, Mexico.
- The individual event venue was held at G.C. Foster College of Physical Education and Sport in Kingston, Jamaica.

=== Point distribution ===
Below is the tables with the point distribution for each phase of the tournament based on the BWF points system for the Pan American Badminton Championships, which is equivalent to a Super 300 event.

Winner	Runner-up	3/4	5/8	9/16	17/32	33/64
7,000	5,950	4,900	3,850	2,750	1,670	660

== Medalists ==
Event	Gold	Silver	Bronze
Men's singles	(Canada) Brian Yang	(El Salvador) Uriel Canjura	(Brazil) Ygor Coelho
Men's singles	(Canada) Brian Yang	(El Salvador) Uriel Canjura	(Guatemala) Kevin Cordón
Women's singles	(Canada) Michelle Li	(United States) Beiwen Zhang	(United States) Iris Wang
Women's singles	(Canada) Michelle Li	(United States) Beiwen Zhang	(United States) Lauren Lam
Men's doubles	(Canada) Adam Dong (Canada) Nyl Yakura	(Canada) Kevin Lee (Canada) Ty Alexander Lindeman	(United States) Vinson Chiu (United States) Joshua Yuan
Men's doubles	(Canada) Adam Dong (Canada) Nyl Yakura	(Canada) Kevin Lee (Canada) Ty Alexander Lindeman	(United States) Chen Zhi-yi (United States) Presley Smith
Women's doubles	(Canada) Catherine Choi (Canada) Josephine Wu	(United States) Francesca Corbett (United States) Allison Lee	(United States) Annie Xu (United States) Kerry Xu
Women's doubles	(Canada) Catherine Choi (Canada) Josephine Wu	(United States) Francesca Corbett (United States) Allison Lee	(Mexico) Haramara Gaitán (Mexico) Sabrina Solis
Mixed doubles	(Canada) Joshua Hurlburt-Yu (Canada) Rachel Honderich	(Canada) Ty Alexander Lindeman (Canada) Josephine Wu	(Brazil) Fabrício Farias (Brazil) Jaqueline Lima
Mixed doubles	(Canada) Joshua Hurlburt-Yu (Canada) Rachel Honderich	(Canada) Ty Alexander Lindeman (Canada) Josephine Wu	(Brazil) Davi Silva (Brazil) Sania Lima
Mixed team	Canada; Brian Yang; B.R. Sankeerth; Nyl Yakura; Adam Dong; Jason Ho-Shue; Kevin Lee; Ty Alexander Lindeman; Michelle Li; Talia Ng; Wen Yu Zhang; Rachel Honderich; Catherine Choi; Josephine Wu	United States; Howard Shu; Adrian Mar; Isaac Yang; Vinson Chiu; Joshua Yuan; Beiwen Zhang; Jennie Gai; Esther Shi; Annie Xu; Kerry Xu	Brazil; Izak Batalha; Ygor Coelho; Fabrício Farias; Francielton Farias; Jonathan Mathias; Davi Silva; Deivid Silva; Matheus Voigt; Jeisiane Alves; Jaqueline Lima; Sâmia Lima; Sania Lima; Rosalina de Souza; Juliana Viana Vieira

=== Medal table ===
* Host nations (Mexico, Jamaica)

Rank	Nation	Gold	Silver	Bronze	Total
1	Canada	6	2	0	8
2	United States	0	3	5	8
3	El Salvador	0	1	0	1
4	Brazil	0	0	4	4
5	Guatemala	0	0	1	1
5	Mexico	0	0	1	1
Totals (6 entries)		6	6	11	23

== Individual event ==
=== Men's singles ===
==== Seeds ====
1. (Canada) Brian Yang (Champion)
2. (Guatemala) Kevin Cordón (Semi-finals)
3. (Brazil) Ygor Coelho (Semi-finals)
4. (El Salvador) Uriel Canjura (Final)
5. (Brazil) Jonathan Matias (Quarter-finals)
6. (United States) Howard Shu (Quarter-finals)
7. (Canada) B. R. Sankeerth (Second Round)
8. (Mexico) Job Castillo (Quarter-finals)

==== Finals ====
Semi-finals
1	(Canada) Brian Yang	16	21	21
3	(Brazil) Ygor Coelho	21	14	19
4	(El Salvador) Uriel Canjura	20	21	21
2	(Guatemala) Kevin Cordón	22	12	14

Final
1	(Canada) Brian Yang	21	21
4	(El Salvador) Uriel Canjura	10	5

==== Top half ====
===== Section 1 =====
First Round
(Argentina) S Otero	18	14
(Guatemala) Y del Cid	21	21
(Jamaica) N Finzi	11	14
(Dominican Republic) A Taveras	21	21

Second Round
1	(Canada) B Yang	21	21
(United States) E Asuncion	10	15
(Venezuela) K Peñalver	14	11
(Guatemala) Y del Cid	21	21
8	(Mexico) J Castillo	21	17	21
(Chile) A Medel	19	21	4
(Jamaica) Z Reid	19	15
(Dominican Republic) A Taveras	21	21

Third Round
1	(Canada) B Yang	21	21
(Guatemala) Y del Cid	10	15
8	(Mexico) J Castillo	21	21
(Dominican Republic) A Taveras	8	9

Quarter-finals
1	(Canada) B Yang	21	21
8	(Mexico) J Castillo	13	5

===== Section 2 =====
First Round
(El Salvador) J Alas	21	21
(Dominican Republic) Y Linarez	19	17
(Canada) I Wadia	21	7	21
(United States) G Tan	13	21	16
(Peru) A Viale	12	20
(Jamaica) S Ricketts	21	22

Second Round
3	(Brazil) Y Coelho	21	21
(Cuba) J Bencomo	13	10
(Mexico) A Gaitán	21	21
(El Salvador) J Alas	12	8
6	(United States) H Shu	21	21
(Canada) I Wadia	14	13
(Costa Rica) G Cavallotti	16	6
(Jamaica) S Ricketts	21	21

Third Round
3	(Brazil) Y Coelho	21	21
(Mexico) A Gaitán	12	18
6	(United States) H Shu	12	21	21
(Jamaica) S Ricketts	21	10	15

Quarter-finals
3	(Brazil) Y Coelho	21
6	(United States) H Shu	13^{r}

==== Bottom half ====
===== Section 3 =====
First Round
(Trinidad and Tobago) N Bonkowsky	10	13
(Brazil) De Silva	21	21
(Peru) S Durand	8	16
(Mexico) L Montoya	21	21
(Jamaica) B Evans	21	21	21
(Dominican Republic) E Zorrilla	16	23	17

Second Round
(Brazil) De Silva	21	21
(Guyana) A Haynes	14	3
(Mexico) L Montoya	21	7	18
4	(El Salvador) U Canjura	16	21	21
(Jamaica) B Evans	w	/	o
(Mexico) L Garrido
(Cuba) R Herrera	14	13
5	(Brazil) J Matias	21	21

Third Round
(Brazil) De Silva	19	17
4	(El Salvador) U Canjura	21	21
(Jamaica) B Evans	6	5
5	(Brazil) J Matias	21	21

Quarter-finals
4	(El Salvador) U Canjura	18	21	21
5	(Brazil) J Matias	21	13	18

===== Section 4 =====
First Round
(Dominican Republic) A Mariñez	15	6
(Paraguay) L Lee	21	21
(United States) J Ma	18	18
(Brazil) Da Silva	21	21
(Jamaica) K Valentine	5	4
(Canada) V Lai	21	21

Second Round
(Paraguay) L Lee	17	21	20
(Ecuador) H Huebla	21	19	22
(Brazil) Da Silva	21	21
7	(Canada) B. R. Sankeerth	16	8
(Canada) V Lai	21	21
(Jamaica) J Angus	7	9
(Venezuela) F Barrios	14	8
2	(Guatemala) K Cordón	21	21

Third Round
(Ecuador) H Huebla	5	6
(Brazil) Da Silva	21	21
(Canada) V Lai	21	15	14
2	(Guatemala) K Cordón	14	21	21

Quarter-finals
(Brazil) Da Silva	18	18
2	(Guatemala) K Cordón	21	21

=== Women's singles ===
==== Seeds ====
1. (Canada) Michelle Li (Champion)
2. (United States) Beiwen Zhang (Final)
3. (United States) Iris Wang (Semi-finals)
4. (United States) Lauren Lam (Semi-finals)
5. (Canada) Wen Yu Zhang (Third Round)
6. (Canada) Talia Ng (Quarter-finals)
7. (Canada) Rachel Chan (Quarter-finals)
8. (Mexico) Haramara Gaitán (Second Round)

==== Finals ====
Semi-finals
1	(Canada) Michelle Li	21	12	21
3	(United States) Iris Wang	15	21	14
4	(United States) Lauren Lam	11	12
2	(United States) Beiwen Zhang	21	21

Final
1	(Canada) Michelle Li	21	21
2	(United States) Beiwen Zhang	19	9

==== Top half ====
===== Section 1 =====
First Round
(Mexico) V García	21	21
(Dominican Republic) C Pie	9	8
(Brazil) J Alves	11
(Chile) A Montre	7^{r}

Second Round
1	(Canada) M Li	21	21
(Peru) F Saponara	11	8
(Jamaica) T Richardson	9	8
(Mexico) V García	21	21
7	(Canada) R Chan	21	21
(Guatemala) N Sotomayor	13	7
(Venezuela) E Parra	7	8
(Brazil) J Alves	21	21

Third Round
1	(Canada) M Li	21	21
(Mexico) V García	9	14
7	(Canada) R Chan	21	21
(Brazil) J Alves	6	15

Quarter-finals
1	(Canada) M Li	17	21	21
7	(Canada) R Chan	21	13	13

===== Section 2 =====
First Round
(Mexico) S Solis	21	21
(Dominican Republic) N Jiménez	4	7
(Jamaica) R Rust	7	6
(Venezuela) M Daibelis	21	21

Second Round
3	(United States) I Wang	21	21
(Cuba) T Oropeza	10	10
(Trinidad and Tobago) C De Boulet	4	7
(Mexico) S Solis	21	21
6	(Canada) T Ng	21	21
(Jamaica) A Beckford	5	4
(Peru) N Miyahira	21	21
(Venezuela) M Daibelis	18	17

Third Round
3	(United States) I Wang	21	21
(Mexico) S Solis	5	6
6	(Canada) T Ng	21	21
(Peru) N Miyahira	5	8

Quarter-finals
3	(United States) I Wang	21	16	21
6	(Canada) T Ng	14	21	6

==== Bottom half ====
===== Section 3 =====
First Round
(Brazil) J V Vieira	21	21
(Dominican Republic) D Acosta	6	6
(Brazil) S Lima	21	21
(Jamaica) B Bisnott	7	6
(Jamaica) K Wynter	11	10
(Peru) I Castillo	21	21

Second Round
(Brazil) J V Vieira	21	21
(Cuba) Y Ortiz	12	13
(Brazil) S Lima	15	13
5	(Canada) W Y Zhang	21	21
(Peru) I Castillo	21	21
(Guyana) P Ramdhani	10	6
(Argentina) I Gualdi	7	4
4	(United States) L Lam	21	21

Third Round
(Brazil) J V Vieira	21	22
5	(Canada) W Y Zhang	17	20
(Peru) I Castillo	11	10
4	(United States) L Lam	21	21

Quarter-finals
(Brazil) J V Vieira	12	7
4	(United States) L Lam	21	21

===== Section 4 =====
First Round
(Guatemala) A Paiz	21	20	10
(Ecuador) M Zambrano	14	22	21
(Jamaica) M Mustafaa	4	11
(Dominican Republic) A Acosta	21	21

Second Round
(Ecuador) M Zambrano	21	21
(El Salvador) D Hernández	7	5
(United States) J Gai	21	21
8	(Mexico) H Gaitán	13	14
(Dominican Republic) A Acosta	10	13
(Peru) F Munar	21	21
(Venezuela) D Ortiz	11	4
2	(United States) BW Zhang	21	21

Third Round
(Ecuador) M Zambrano	10	8
(United States) J Gai	21	21
(Peru) F Munar	8	10
2	(United States) BW Zhang	21	21

Quarter-finals
(United States) J Gai	19	21	2
2	(United States) BW Zhang	21	15	21

=== Men's doubles ===
==== Seeds ====
1. (Canada) Adam Dong / Nyl Yakura (Champions)
2. (Canada) Kevin Lee / Ty Alexander Lindeman (Final)
3. (United States) Vinson Chiu / Joshua Yuan (Semi-finals)
4. (Mexico) Job Castillo / Luis Montoya (Quarter-finals)

==== Finals ====
Semi-finals
1	(Canada) Adam Dong (Canada) Nyl Yakura	17	21	21
(United States) Chen Zhi-yi (United States) Presley Smith	21	18	16
3/4	(United States) Vinson Chiu (United States) Joshua Yuan	17	21
2	(Canada) Kevin Lee (Canada) Ty Alexander Lindeman	21	23

Final
1	(Canada) Adam Dong (Canada) Nyl Yakura	21	16	22
2	(Canada) Kevin Lee (Canada) Ty Alexander Lindeman	10	21	20

=== Women's doubles ===
==== Seeds ====
1. (Canada) Catherine Choi / Josephine Wu (Champions)
2. (Brazil) Jaqueline Lima / Sâmia Lima (Second round)
3. (United States) Annie Xu / Kerry Xu (Semi-finals)
4. (United States) Francesca Corbett / Allison Lee (Finals)

==== Finals ====
Semi-finals
1	(Canada) Catherine Choi (Canada) Josephine Wu	21	21
3/4	(United States) Annie Xu (United States) Kerry Xu	19	8
3/4	(United States) Francesca Corbett (United States) Allison Lee	21	21
(Mexico) Haramara Gaitán (Mexico) Sabrina Solis	5	8

Final
1	(Canada) Catherine Choi (Canada) Josephine Wu	21	21
3/4	(United States) Francesca Corbett (United States) Allison Lee	14	18

=== Mixed doubles ===
==== Seeds ====
1. (Canada) Ty Alexander Lindeman / Josephine Wu (Final)
2. (United States) Vinson Chiu / Jennie Gai (Quarter-finals)
3. (Brazil) Fabrício Farias / Jaqueline Lima (Semi-finals)
4. (Guatemala) Jonathan Solís / Diana Corleto (Second round)
5. (Brazil) Davi Silva / Sania Lima (Semi-finals)
6. (Canada) Nicolas Nguyen / Alexandra Mocanu (Third round)
7. (Brazil) Deivid Silva / Sâmia Lima (Second round)
8. (Dominican Republic) Anderson Taveras / Daniela Acosta (Second round)

==== Finals ====
Semi-finals
1	(Canada) Ty Alexander Lindeman (Canada) Josephine Wu	23	22
3/4	(Brazil) Fabrício Farias (Brazil) Jaqueline Lima	21	20
(Canada) Joshua Hurlburt-Yu (Canada) Rachel Honderich	21	17	21
5/8	(Brazil) Davi Silva (Brazil) Sania Lima	18	21	21

Final
1	(Canada) Ty Alexander Lindeman (Canada) Josephine Wu	20	21	17
(Canada) Joshua Hurlburt-Yu (Canada) Rachel Honderich	22	18	21

== Team event ==
=== Group A ===
Pos	Team	Pld	W	L	MF	MA	MD	GF	GA	GD	PF	PA	PD	Pts	Qualification
1	Canada	2	2	0	10	0	+10	20	0	+20	420	187	+233	2	Advance to quarter-finals
2	Ecuador	2	1	1	3	7	−4	7	14	−7	314	384	−70	1	Advance to quarter-finals
3	El Salvador	2	0	2	2	8	−6	4	17	−13	256	419	−163	0	

Source: tournamentsoftware.com

==== Canada vs Ecuador ====
Canada
5
CODE Guadalajara - Court 1
16 February 2023, 10:00 UTC−6

Ecuador
0

			1	2	3
1	(Canada) (Ecuador)	Ty Alexander Lindeman / Josephine Wu; Andy Baque / Natalia Tapia	21; 9	21; 11
2	(Canada) (Ecuador)	B. R. Sankeerth; Joseph Huebla	21; 14	21; 11
3	(Canada) (Ecuador)	Michelle Li; Maria Delia Zambrano	21; 11	21; 19
4	(Canada) (Ecuador)	Adam Dong / Nyl Yakura; Andy Baque / Joseph Huebla	21; 7	21; 6
5	(Canada) (Ecuador)	Catherine Choi / Rachel Honderich; Natalia Tapia / Maria Delia Zambrano	21; 4	21; 13

==== El Salvador vs Ecuador ====
El Salvador
2
CODE Guadalajara - Court 1
16 February 2023, 14:00 UTC−6

Ecuador
3

			1	2	3
1	(El Salvador) (Ecuador)	Javier Alas; Andy Baque	7; 21	14; 21
2	(El Salvador) (Ecuador)	Daniela Hernández; Maria Delia Zambrano	7; 21	10; 21
3	(El Salvador) (Ecuador)	Manuel Mejia / Kennet Suria; Andy Baque / Joseph Huebla	19; 21	14; 21
4	(El Salvador) (Ecuador)	Fátima Centeno / Daniela Hernández; Natalia Tapia / Maria Delia Zambrano	21; 4	19; 13
5	(El Salvador) (Ecuador)	Javier Alas / Fátima Centeno; Joseph Huebla / Natalia Tapia	21; 19	21; 13

==== Canada vs El Salvador ====
Canada
5
CODE Guadalajara - Court 1
16 February 2023, 18:00 UTC−6

El Salvador
0

			1	2	3
1	(Canada) (El Salvador)	Wen Yu Zhang; Gabriela Barrios	21; 5	21; 4
2	(Canada) (El Salvador)	Brian Yang; José Orellana	21; 4	21; 10
3	(Canada) (El Salvador)	Catherine Choi / Josephine Wu; Gabriela Barrios / Margareth Revelo	21; 4	21; 6
4	(Canada) (El Salvador)	Kevin Lee / Ty Alexander Lindeman; Manuel Mejía / Kennet Suria	21; 9	21; 18
5	(Canada) (El Salvador)	B. R. Sankeerth / Rachel Honderich; José Orellana / Margareth Revelo	21; 11	21; 11

=== Group B ===
Pos	Team	Pld	W	L	MF	MA	MD	GF	GA	GD	PF	PA	PD	Pts	Qualification
1	United States	2	2	0	7	3	+4	15	7	+8	423	313	+110	2	Advance to quarter-finals
2	Mexico (H)	2	1	1	6	4	+2	14	8	+6	395	360	+35	1	Advance to quarter-finals
3	Argentina	2	0	2	2	8	−6	4	18	−14	298	443	−145	0	

Source: tournamentsoftware.com
(H) Host

==== United States vs Mexico ====
United States
3
CODE Guadalajara - Court 2
16 February 2023, 10:00 UTC−6

Mexico
2

			1	2	3
1	(United States) (Mexico)	Vinson Chiu / Joshua Yuan; Job Castillo / Luis Montoya	18; 21	19; 21
2	(United States) (Mexico)	Beiwen Zhang; Vanessa García	21; 10	21; 14
3	(United States) (Mexico)	Isaac Yang; Luis Ramón Garrido	8; 21	13; 21
4	(United States) (Mexico)	Annie Xu / Kerry Xu; Haramara Gaitán / Sabrina Solis	21; 12	21; 5
5	(United States) (Mexico)	Vinson Chiu / Jennie Gai; Luis Montoya / Miriam Rodríguez	16; 21	21; 10	21; 19

==== Argentina vs Mexico ====
Argentina
1
CODE Guadalajara - Court 2
16 February 2023, 14:00 UTC−6

Mexico
4

			1	2	3
1	(Argentina) (Mexico)	Nicolas Oliva / Iona Gualdi; Luis Montoya / Miriam Rodríguez	17; 21	9; 21
2	(Argentina) (Mexico)	Santiago Otero; Armando Gaitán	11; 21	15; 21
3	(Argentina) (Mexico)	Ailen Oliva; Haramara Gaitán	13; 21	11; 21
4	(Argentina) (Mexico)	Nicolas Oliva / Santiago Otero; Andrés López / Gerardo Saavedra	21; 9	15; 21	24; 22
5	(Argentina) (Mexico)	Iona Gualdi / Ailen Oliva; Romina Fregoso / Miriam Rodríguez	14; 21	10; 21

==== United States vs Argentina ====
United States
4
CODE Guadalajara - Court 2
16 February 2023, 18:00 UTC−6

Argentina
1

			1	2	3
1	(United States) (Argentina)	Isaac Yang / Esther Shi; Santiago Otero / Ailen Oliva	21; 9	21; 12
2	(United States) (Argentina)	Howard Shu; Nicolas Oliva	21; 15	15; 21	19; 21
3	(United States) (Argentina)	Jennie Gai; Iona Gualdi	21; 9	21; 15
4	(United States) (Argentina)	Adrian King-Sun Mar / Joshua Yuan; Nicolas Oliva / Santiago Otero	21; 13	21; 15
5	(United States) (Argentina)	Annie Xu / Kerry Xu; Iona Gualdi / Ailen Oliva	21; 4	21; 4

=== Group C ===
Pos	Team	Pld	W	L	MF	MA	MD	GF	GA	GD	PF	PA	PD	Pts	Qualification
1	Brazil	2	2	0	8	2	+6	16	6	+10	441	353	+88	2	Advance to quarter-finals
2	Guatemala	2	1	1	4	6	−2	10	12	−2	390	402	−12	1	Advance to quarter-finals
3	Peru	2	0	2	3	7	−4	8	16	−8	401	477	−76	0	

Source: tournamentsoftware.com

==== Brazil vs Guatemala ====
Brazil
4
CODE Guadalajara - Court 3
16 February 2023, 10:00 UTC−6

Guatemala
1

			1	2	3
1	(Brazil) (Guatemala)	Ygor Coelho; Christopher Martínez	21; 14	21; 19
2	(Brazil) (Guatemala)	Juliana Viana Vieira; Alejandra Paiz	21; 3	21; 10
3	(Brazil) (Guatemala)	Fabrício Farias / Davi Silva; Kevin Cordón / Aníbal Marroquín	18; 21	14; 21
4	(Brazil) (Guatemala)	Jaqueline Lima / Sâmia Lima; Diana Corleto / Nikté Sotomayor	21; 18	23; 21
5	(Brazil) (Guatemala)	Fabrício Farias / Jaqueline Lima; Jonathan Solís / Alejandra Paiz	21; 14	21; 11

==== Peru vs Guatemala ====
Peru
2
CODE Guadalajara - Court 3
16 February 2023, 14:00 UTC−6

Guatemala
3

			1	2	3
1	(Peru) (Guatemala)	Diego Mini / Paula la Torre Regal; Jonathan Solís / Diana Corleto	8; 21	14; 21
2	(Peru) (Guatemala)	Adriano Viale; Kevin Cordón	18; 21	11; 21
3	(Peru) (Guatemala)	Fernanda Saponara Rivva; Nikté Sotomayor	21; 18	15; 21	21; 18
4	(Peru) (Guatemala)	José Guevara / Diego Mini; Aníbal Marroquín / Christopher Martínez	17; 21	21; 16	21; 18
5	(Peru) (Guatemala)	Inés Castillo / Paula la Torre Regal; Diana Corleto / Nikté Sotomayor	15; 21	18; 21

==== Brazil vs Peru ====
Brazil
4
CODE Guadalajara - Court 3
16 February 2023, 18:00 UTC−6

Peru
1

			1	2	3
1	(Brazil) (Peru)	Jonathan Matias; Adriano Viale	15; 21	19; 21
2	(Brazil) (Peru)	Juliana Viana Vieira; Inés Castillo	21; 16	21; 19
3	(Brazil) (Peru)	Fabrício Farias / Matheus Voigt; José Guevara / Diego Mini	21; 15	19; 21	21; 17
4	(Brazil) (Peru)	Jaqueline Lima / Sâmia Lima; Fernanda Munar / Fernanda Saponara Rivva	21; 15	21; 11
5	(Brazil) (Peru)	Fabrício Farias / Jaqueline Lima; José Guevara / Inés Castillo	18; 21	21; 14	21; 10

=== 7th to 9th ===
Pos	Team	Pld	W	L	MF	MA	MD	GF	GA	GD	PF	PA	PD	Pts
1	Peru	2	2	0	9	1	+8	19	2	+17	429	279	+150	2
2	Argentina	2	1	1	4	6	−2	10	13	−3	376	399	−23	1
3	El Salvador	2	0	2	2	8	−6	4	18	−14	297	424	−127	0

Source: tournamentsoftware.com

==== El Salvador vs Peru ====
El Salvador
0
CODE Guadalajara - Court 3
17 February 2023, 10:00 UTC−6

Peru
5

			1	2	3
1	(El Salvador) (Peru)	Javier Alas / Fátima Centeno; Diego Mini / Paula la Torre Regal	18; 21	17; 21
2	(El Salvador) (Peru)	José Orellana; Adriano Viale	6; 21	4; 21
3	(El Salvador) (Peru)	Gabriela Barrios; Fernanda Saponara Rivva	14; 21	12; 21
4	(El Salvador) (Peru)	Javier Alas / José Orellana; José Guevara / Diego Mini	14; 21	11; 21
5	(El Salvador) (Peru)	Fátima Centeno / Margareth Revelo; Fernanda Munar / Fernanda Saponara Rivva	14; 21	7; 21

==== Argentina vs Peru ====
Argentina
1
CODE Guadalajara - Court 2
17 February 2023, 16:00 UTC−6

Peru
4

			1	2	3
1	(Argentina) (Peru)	Santiago Otero; Adriano Viale	13; 21	4; 21
2	(Argentina) (Peru)	Ailen Oliva; Inés Castillo	17; 21	10; 21
3	(Argentina) (Peru)	Nicolas Oliva / Santiago Otero; José Guevara / Diego Mini	21; 13	19; 21	21; 17
4	(Argentina) (Peru)	Iona Gualdi / Ailen Oliva; Inés Castillo / Paula la Torre Regal	15; 21	15; 21
5	(Argentina) (Peru)	Nicolas Oliva / Iona Gualdi; Adriano Viale / Fernanda Saponara Rivva	11; 21	16; 21

==== El Salvador vs Argentina ====
El Salvador
2
CODE Guadalajara - Court 2
18 February 2023, 10:00 UTC−6

Argentina
3

			1	2	3
1	(El Salvador) (Argentina)	Javier Alas; Nicolas Oliva	14; 21	9; 21
2	(El Salvador) (Argentina)	Daniela Hernández; Iona Gualdi	6; 21	8; 21
3	(El Salvador) (Argentina)	Manuel Mejia / Kennet Suria; Nicolas Oliva / Santiago Otero	13; 21	14; 21
4	(El Salvador) (Argentina)	Fátima Centeno / Daniela Hernández; Iona Gualdi / Ailen Oliva	19; 21	21; 10	21; 11
5	(El Salvador) (Argentina)	Javier Alas / Fátima Centeno; Santiago Otero / Ailen Oliva	13; 21	21; 12	21; 13

=== Knockout stage ===
Quarter-finals
Mexico	3
Ecuador	0
Guatemala	2
Brazil	3

Semifinals
Canada	3
Mexico	0
United States	3
Brazil	1
Play-off 5/6
6	Ecuador	0
5	Guatemala	3

Final
Canada	3
United States	0
Play-off 3/4
4	Mexico	2
Brazil	3

=== Quarter-finals ===
==== Mexico vs Ecuador ====
Mexico
3
CODE Guadalajara - Court 1
17 February 2023, 10:00 UTC−6

Ecuador
0

			1	2	3
1	(Mexico) (Ecuador)	Armando Gaitán / Haramara Gaitán; Joseph Huebla / Natalia Tapia	21; 14	21; 15
2	(Mexico) (Ecuador)	Luis Ramón Garrido; Andy Baque	21; 12	21; 8
3	(Mexico) (Ecuador)	Sabrina Solis; Maria Delia Zambrano	21; 11	21; 16
4	(Mexico) (Ecuador)	Job Castillo / Luis Montoya; Andy Baque / Joseph Huebla				not played
5	(Mexico) (Ecuador)	Romina Fregoso / Miriam Rodríguez; Natalia Tapia / Maria Delia Zambrano				not played

==== Guatemala vs Brazil ====
Guatemala
2
CODE Guadalajara - Court 2
17 February 2023, 10:00 UTC−6

Brazil
3

			1	2	3
1	(Guatemala) (Brazil)	Jonathan Solís / Diana Corleto; Fabrício Farias / Jaqueline Lima	16; 21	14; 21
2	(Guatemala) (Brazil)	Kevin Cordón; Ygor Coelho	6; 21	21; 15	21; 18
3	(Guatemala) (Brazil)	Alejandra Paiz; Juliana Viana Vieira	10; 21	5; 21
4	(Guatemala) (Brazil)	Kevin Cordón / Aníbal Marroquín; Fabrício Farias / Matheus Voigt		21; 10	21; 14
5	(Guatemala) (Brazil)	Diana Corleto / Nikté Sotomayor; Jaqueline Lima / Sâmia Lima	16; 21	21; 16	19; 21

=== Semi-finals ===
==== Brazil vs USA ====
Brazil
1
CODE Guadalajara - Court 2
18 February 2023, 10:00 UTC−6

United States
3

			1	2	3
1	(Brazil) (United States)	Fabrício Farias / Matheus Voigt; Vinson Chiu / Joshua Yuan	13; 21	10; 21
2	(Brazil) (United States)	Juliana Viana Vieira; Beiwen Zhang	14; 21	12; 21
3	(Brazil) (United States)	Jonathan Mathias; Adrian King-Sun Mar	21; 18	21; 12
4	(Brazil) (United States)	Sâmia Lima / Sania Lima; Annie Xu / Kerry Xu	17; 21	15; 21
5	(Brazil) (United States)	Fabrício Farias / Jaqueline Lima; Vinson Chiu / Jennie Gai				not played

==== Canada vs Mexico ====
Canada
3
CODE Guadalajara - Court 2
18 February 2023, 10:00 UTC−6

Mexico
0

			1	2	3
1	(Canada) (Mexico)	Adam Dong / Nyl Yakura; Job Castillo / Luis Montoya	20; 22	21; 14	21; 14
2	(Canada) (Mexico)	Michelle Li; Vanessa García	21; 9	21; 7
3	(Canada) (Mexico)	Brian Yang; Luis Ramón Garrido	21; 9	21; 19
4	(Canada) (Mexico)	Catherine Choi / Rachel Honderich; Haramara Gaitán / Sabrina Solis				not played
5	(Canada) (Mexico)	Ty Alexander Lindeman / Josephine Wu; Luis Montoya / Miriam Rodríguez				not played

=== Play-off 5/6 ===
==== Ecuador vs Guatemala ====
Ecuador
0
CODE Guadalajara - Court 1
17 February 2023, 16:00 UTC−6

Guatemala
3

			1	2	3
1	(Ecuador) (Guatemala)	Joseph Huebla; Christopher Martínez	16; 21	14; 21
2	(Ecuador) (Guatemala)	Maria Delia Zambrano; Alejandra Paiz	9; 21	16; 21
3	(Ecuador) (Guatemala)	Andy Baque / Joseph Huebla; Aníbal Marroquín / Jonathan Solís	7; 21	10; 21
4	(Ecuador) (Guatemala)	Natalia Tapia / Maria Delia Zambrano; Diana Corleto / Nikté Sotomayor				not played
5	(Ecuador) (Guatemala)	Andy Baque / Natalia Tapia; Christopher Martínez / Alejandra Paiz				not played

=== Play-off 3/4 ===
==== Mexico vs Brazil ====
Mexico
2
CODE Guadalajara - Court 1
18 February 2023, 16:00 UTC−6

Brazil
3

			1	2	3
1	(Mexico) (Brazil)	Luis Montoya / Miriam Rodríguez; Fabrício Farias / Jaqueline Lima	17; 21	14; 21
2	(Mexico) (Brazil)	Luis Ramon Garrido; Ygor Coelho	21; 15	19; 21	22; 20
3	(Mexico) (Brazil)	Job Castillo / Luis Montoya; Fabrício Farias / Davi Silva	21; 15	21; 17
4	(Mexico) (Brazil)	Vanessa García; Juliana Viana Vieira	12; 21	9; 21
5	(Mexico) (Brazil)	Romina Fregoso / Miriam Rodríguez; Sâmia Lima / Sania Lima	21; 13	15; 21	17; 21

=== Final ===
==== Canada vs United States ====
Canada
3
CODE Guadalajara - Court 1
19 February 2023, 10:00 UTC−6

United States
0

			1	2	3
1	(Canada) (United States)	Ty Alexander Lindeman / Josephine Wu; Vinson Chiu / Jennie Gain	22; 20	21; 16
2	(Canada) (United States)	Brian Yang; Isaac Yang	21; 12	21; 12
3	(Canada) (United States)	Adam Dong / Nyl Yakura; Vinson Chiu / Joshua Yuan	21; 18	21; 17
4	(Canada) (United States)	Michelle Li; Beiwen Zhang				not played
5	(Canada) (United States)	Josephine Wu / Rachel Honderich; Annie Xu / Kerry Xu				not played

=== Final ranking ===
Pos	Team	Pld	W	L	Pts	MD	GD	PD
1st place, gold medalist(s)	Canada	4	4	0	4	+16	+31	+317
2nd place, silver medalist(s)	United States	4	3	1	3	+3	+6	+111
3rd place, bronze medalist(s)	Brazil	5	4	1	4	+6	+10	+102
4	Mexico	5	2	3	2	+1	+5	+15
5	Guatemala	4	2	2	2	0	+2	+13
6	Ecuador	4	1	3	1	−10	−19	−174
7	Peru	4	2	2	2	+4	+9	+74
8	Argentina	4	1	3	1	−8	−17	−168
9	El Salvador	4	0	4	0	−12	−27	−290
