= 2024 Pan Am Male & Female Badminton Cup =

Tournament details
- Dates: 15–18 February 2024
- Edition: 2
- Venue: Centro Paralímpico Brasileiro
- Location: São Paulo, Brazil

Champions
- Men's teams: Canada
- Women's teams: Canada

The 2024 Pan Am Male & Female Badminton Cup was a continental badminton team tournament to crown the best men's and women's team for the Americas. The tournament also served as the Pan American qualifiers for the 2024 Thomas & Uber Cup to be held in Chengdu, China. It was held in São Paulo, Brazil from 15 to 18 February 2024.

The championships were organized by the Brazil Badminton Confederation together with the Badminton Pan America confederation. This is the third time Brazil hosted the championships. Canada were the title holders of men's team event while the United States were the title holders for the women's team.

== Medalists ==
| Event | Gold | Silver | Bronze |
|---|---|---|---|
| Men's team | Canada; B. R. Sankeerth; Adam Dong; Victor Lai; Kevin Lee; Ty Alexander Lindeman; Josh Nguyen; Imran Wadia; Nyl Yakura; Brian Yang | Brazil; Izak Batalha; Ygor Coelho; Fabrício Farias; Francielton Farias; Jonathan Matias; Donnians Oliveira; Artur Pomoceno; Davi Silva; Deivid Silva; Matheus Voigt | Mexico; Job Castillo; Armando Gaitán; Luis Ramón Garrido; Luis Montoya; Gerardo Saavedra |
| Women's team | Canada; Rachel Chan; Catherine Choi; Jeslyn Chow; Jackie Dent; Crystal Lai; Michelle Li; Talia Ng; Josephine Wu; Eliana Zhang; Wen Yu Zhang | United States; Francesca Corbett; Allison Lee; Ella Lin; Katelin Ngo; Esther Shi; Joline Siu; Annie Xu; Kerry Xu; Veronica Yang; Beiwen Zhang | Brazil; Jeisiane Alves; Natalya Geisler; Jaqueline Lima; Sâmia Lima; Sayane Lima; Maria Rocha; Tamires Santos; Karen Souza; Lohaynny Vicente; Juliana Vieira |

=== Medal table ===
* Host nation (Brazil)

| Rank | Nation | Gold | Silver | Bronze | Total |
|---|---|---|---|---|---|
| 1 | Canada | 2 | 0 | 0 | 2 |
| 2 | Brazil* | 0 | 1 | 1 | 2 |
| 3 | United States | 0 | 1 | 0 | 1 |
| 4 | Mexico | 0 | 0 | 1 | 1 |
| Totals (4 entries) | | 2 | 2 | 2 | 6 |

== Tournament ==
The team event of 2024 Pan Am Badminton Championships officially named Pan Am M&F Cup 2024, is a continental qualification tournament of 2024 Thomas & Uber Cup, and also to crown the best men's and women's badminton team in Pan America. This event was organized by Badminton Pan America and the Brazil Badminton Confederation.

=== Venue ===
- The team event is being held at Centro Paralímpico Brasileiro in the city of São Paulo, Brazil.

=== Seeds ===
- Men's team
1. Canada
2. Brazil
3. United States
4. Mexico
- Women's team
1. United States
2. Canada

=== Draw ===
The draw was held on 14 February 2024 at Centro Paralímpico Brasileiro in São Paulo, Brazil during the Team Managers meeting. Both the men's team and the women's team group stage consists of two groups. A total of 14 teams, consisting of 8 men's teams and 6 women's teams entered the tournament. Jamaica and the Cayman Islands withdrew from the tournament.

- Men's team

| Group A | Group B |
|---|---|
| Canada; Guatemala; El Salvador; Peru | Brazil; United States; Mexico; Paraguay |

- Women's team

| Group A | Group B |
|---|---|
| United States; Mexico; Peru | Canada; El Salvador; Brazil |

== Male Cup ==
All times are Brazil Standard Time (UTC−03:00).

=== Group stage ===
==== Group A ====
| Pos | Team | Pld | W | L | MF | MA | MD | GF | GA | GD | PF | PA | PD | Pts | Qualification |
|---|---|---|---|---|---|---|---|---|---|---|---|---|---|---|---|
| 1 | Canada | 3 | 3 | 0 | 15 | 0 | +15 | 30 | 1 | +29 | 650 | 321 | +329 | 3 | Semi-finals |
| 2 | Guatemala | 3 | 2 | 1 | 9 | 6 | +3 | 18 | 12 | +6 | 526 | 489 | +37 | 2 | Semi-finals |
| 3 | Peru | 3 | 1 | 2 | 5 | 10 | −5 | 11 | 20 | −9 | 491 | 569 | −78 | 1 | 5th–8th place |
| 4 | El Salvador | 3 | 0 | 3 | 1 | 14 | −13 | 2 | 28 | −26 | 332 | 620 | −288 | 0 | 5th–8th place |

Source: TS

Canada
5
Centro Paralímpico Brasileiro, Court 1
15 February 2024, 08:00

Peru
0

| | | | 1 | 2 | 3 |
|---|---|---|---|---|---|
| 1 | (Canada) (Peru) | Victor Lai; Adriano Viale | 18; 21 | 21; 7 | 22; 20 |
| 2 | (Canada) (Peru) | Imran Wadia; Sharum Durand | 21; 17 | 21; 4 |
| 3 | (Canada) (Peru) | Josh Nguyen; Brian Roque | 21; 6 | 21; 7 |
| 4 | (Canada) (Peru) | Kevin Lee / Ty Alexander Lindeman; Alejandro Chueca / Sharum Durand | 21; 10 | 21; 9 |
| 5 | (Canada) (Peru) | Adam Dong / Nyl Yakura; Brian Roque / Adriano Viale | 21; 13 | 21; 9 |

Guatemala
5
Centro Paralímpico Brasileiro, Court 2
15 February 2024, 08:00

El Salvador
0

| | | | 1 | 2 | 3 |
|---|---|---|---|---|---|
| 1 | (Guatemala) (El Salvador) | Kevin Cordón; Uriel Canjura | 21; 12 | 21; 10 |
| 2 | (Guatemala) (El Salvador) | Yeison del Cid; Javier Alas | 21; 12 | 21; 7 |
| 3 | (Guatemala) (El Salvador) | José Granados; Manuel Mejía | 21; 9 | 21; 12 |
| 4 | (Guatemala) (El Salvador) | Yeison del Cid / Jonathan Solís; Uriel Canjura / Manuel Mejía | 21; 9 | 21; 14 |
| 5 | (Guatemala) (El Salvador) | José Granados / Antonio Ortíz; Javier Alas / Melvin Calzadilla | 21; 10 | 21; 15 |

Canada
5
Centro Paralímpico Brasileiro, Court 3
15 February 2024, 15:00

El Salvador
0

| | | | 1 | 2 | 3 |
|---|---|---|---|---|---|
| 1 | (Canada) (El Salvador) | Brian Yang; Uriel Canjura | 21; 15 | 21; 18 |
| 2 | (Canada) (El Salvador) | Imran Wadia; Javier Alas | 21; 8 | 21; 9 |
| 3 | (Canada) (El Salvador) | Josh Nguyen; Melvin Calzadilla | 21; 5 | 21; 3 |
| 4 | (Canada) (El Salvador) | Adam Dong / Nyl Yakura; Javier Alas / Uriel Canjura | 21; 8 | 21; 11 |
| 5 | (Canada) (El Salvador) | Kevin Lee / Ty Alexander Lindeman; Melvin Calzadilla / Manuel Mejía | 21; 3 | 21; 3 |

Guatemala
4
Centro Paralímpico Brasileiro, Court 4
15 February 2024, 15:00

Peru
1

| | | | 1 | 2 | 3 |
|---|---|---|---|---|---|
| 1 | (Guatemala) (Peru) | Kevin Cordón; Adriano Viale | 21; 11 | 21; 13 |
| 2 | (Guatemala) (Peru) | Yeison del Cid; Sharum Durand | 21; 16 | 21; 19 |
| 3 | (Guatemala) (Peru) | Antonio Ortíz; Alejandro Chueca | 16; 21 | 17; 21 |
| 4 | (Guatemala) (Peru) | José Granados / Jonathan Solís; Alejandro Chueca / Sharum Durand | 21; 15 | 21; 16 |
| 5 | (Guatemala) (Peru) | Yeison del Cid / Antonio Ortíz; Brian Roque / Adriano Viale | 21; 17 | 21; 19 |

Peru
4
Centro Paralímpico Brasileiro, Court 4
16 February 2024, 08:00

El Salvador
1

| | | | 1 | 2 | 3 |
|---|---|---|---|---|---|
| 1 | (Peru) (El Salvador) | Adriano Viale; Uriel Canjura | 21; 11 | 21; 10 |
| 2 | (Peru) (El Salvador) | Sharum Durand; Javier Alas | 23; 21 | 21; 13 |
| 3 | (Peru) (El Salvador) | Alejandro Chueca; Manuel Mejía | 21; 13 | 21; 12 |
| 4 | (Peru) (El Salvador) | Alejandro Chueca / Sharum Durand; Javier Alas / Uriel Canjura | 15; 21 | 15; 21 |
| 5 | (Peru) (El Salvador) | Brian Roque / Adriano Viale; Melvin Calzadilla / Manuel Mejía | 21; 8 | 21; 9 |

Canada
5
Centro Paralímpico Brasileiro, Court 1
16 February 2024, 08:00

Guatemala
0

| | | | 1 | 2 | 3 |
|---|---|---|---|---|---|
| 1 | (Canada) (Guatemala) | Brian Yang; Yeison del Cid | 21; 10 | 21; 13 |
| 2 | (Canada) (Guatemala) | Victor Lai; José Granados | 21; 7 | 21; 4 |
| 3 | (Canada) (Guatemala) | Imran Wadia; Antonio Ortíz | 21; 9 | 21; 9 |
| 4 | (Canada) (Guatemala) | Kevin Lee / Ty Alexander Lindeman; Yeison del Cid / Jonathan Solís | 22; 20 | 21; 18 |
| 5 | (Canada) (Guatemala) | Adam Dong / Nyl Yakura; José Granados / Antonio Ortíz | 21; 16 | 21; 9 |

==== Group B ====
| Pos | Team | Pld | W | L | MF | MA | MD | GF | GA | GD | PF | PA | PD | Pts | Qualification |
|---|---|---|---|---|---|---|---|---|---|---|---|---|---|---|---|
| 1 | Brazil (H) | 3 | 3 | 0 | 14 | 1 | +13 | 27 | 6 | +21 | 677 | 431 | +246 | 3 | Semi-finals |
| 2 | Mexico | 3 | 2 | 1 | 9 | 6 | +3 | 19 | 12 | +7 | 566 | 462 | +104 | 2 | Semi-finals |
| 3 | United States | 3 | 1 | 2 | 7 | 8 | −1 | 18 | 16 | +2 | 604 | 526 | +78 | 1 | 5th–8th place |
| 4 | Paraguay | 3 | 0 | 3 | 0 | 15 | −15 | 0 | 30 | −30 | 202 | 630 | −428 | 0 | 5th–8th place |

Source: TS
(H) Host

Brazil
5
Centro Paralímpico Brasileiro, Court 3
15 February 2024, 08:00

Paraguay
0

| | | | 1 | 2 | 3 |
|---|---|---|---|---|---|
| 1 | (Brazil) (Paraguay) | Deivid Silva; Leo Lee | 21; 14 | 21; 11 |
| 2 | (Brazil) (Paraguay) | Donnians Oliveira; Jordan Lee | 21; 1 | 21; 6 |
| 3 | (Brazil) (Paraguay) | Artur Silva Pomoceno; Yuji Mochizuki | 21; 10 | 21; 6 |
| 4 | (Brazil) (Paraguay) | Fabrício Farias / Davi Silva; Carlos Guerrero / Heitor Liao | 21; 4 | 21; 2 |
| 5 | (Brazil) (Paraguay) | Izak Batalha / Matheus Voigt; Leo Lee / Yuji Mochizuki | 21; 5 | 21; 14 |

United States
2
Centro Paralímpico Brasileiro, Court 4
15 February 2024, 08:00

Mexico
3

| | | | 1 | 2 | 3 |
|---|---|---|---|---|---|
| 1 | (United States) (Mexico) | Howard Shu; Luis Ramón Garrido | 15; 21 | 13; 21 |
| 2 | (United States) (Mexico) | Jeffrey Chang / Kai Chong; Job Castillo / Luis Montoya | 15; 21 | 16; 21 |
| 3 | (United States) (Mexico) | Enrico Asuncion; Armando Gaitán | 22; 20 | 13; 21 | 10; 21 |
| 4 | (United States) (Mexico) | Garret Tan; Luis Montoya | 21; 6 | 21; 16 |
| 5 | (United States) (Mexico) | Arthur Lee / Samuel Wales Li; Armando Gaitán / Gerardo Saavedra | 23; 21 | 21; 13 |

Brazil
4
Centro Paralímpico Brasileiro, Court 1
15 February 2024, 15:00

Mexico
1

| | | | 1 | 2 | 3 |
|---|---|---|---|---|---|---|
| 1 | (Brazil) (Mexico) | Ygor Coelho; Luis Ramón Garrido | 21; 19 | 21; 6 |
| 2 | (Brazil) (Mexico) | Jonathan Matias; Job Castillo | 21; 9 | 21; 10 |
| 3 | (Brazil) (Mexico) | Donnians Oliveira; Armando Gaitán | 21; 23 | 21; 12 | 18; 21 |
| 4 | (Brazil) (Mexico) | Fabrício Farias / Davi Silva; Job Castillo / Luis Montoya | 23; 21 | 16; 21 | 21; 12 |
| 5 | (Brazil) (Mexico) | Izak Batalha / Matheus Voigt; Armando Gaitán / Luis Ramón Garrido | | | | w/o |

United States
5
Centro Paralímpico Brasileiro, Court 2
15 February 2024, 15:00

Paraguay
0

| | | | 1 | 2 | 3 |
|---|---|---|---|---|---|
| 1 | (United States) (Paraguay) | Howard Shu; Leo Lee | 21; 11 | 21; 16 |
| 2 | (United States) (Paraguay) | Jeffrey Chang / Kai Chong; Jordan Lee / Yuji Mochizuki | 21; 5 | 21; 4 |
| 3 | (United States) (Paraguay) | Ryan Ma; Heitor Liao | 21; 5 | 21; 5 |
| 4 | (United States) (Paraguay) | Enrico Asuncion / Kelvin Chong; Carlos Guerrero / Heitor Liao | 21; 2 | 21; 3 |
| 5 | (United States) (Paraguay) | Nicholas Chiu; Yuji Mochizuki | 21; 6 | 21; 4 |

Mexico
5
Centro Paralímpico Brasileiro, Court 3
16 February 2024, 08:00

Paraguay
0

| | | | 1 | 2 | 3 |
|---|---|---|---|---|---|
| 1 | (Mexico) (Paraguay) | Armando Gaitán; Leo Lee | 21; 12 | 21; 14 |
| 2 | (Mexico) (Paraguay) | Luis Montoya; Heitor Liao | 21; 2 | 21; 1 |
| 3 | (Mexico) (Paraguay) | Gerardo Saavedra; Carlos Guerrero | 21; 5 | 21; 3 |
| 4 | (Mexico) (Paraguay) | Job Castillo / Luis Montoya; Carlos Guerrero / Heitor Liao | 21; 3 | 21; 7 |
| 5 | (Mexico) (Paraguay) | Armando Gaitán / Gerardo Saavedra; Jordan Lee / Yuji Mochizuki | 21; 8 | 21; 13 |

Brazil
5
Centro Paralímpico Brasileiro, Court 2
16 February 2024, 08:00

United States
0

| | | | 1 | 2 | 3 |
|---|---|---|---|---|---|
| 1 | (Brazil) (United States) | Ygor Coelho; Howard Shu | 19; 21 | 21; 13 | 21; 13 |
| 2 | (Brazil) (United States) | Jonathan Matias; Garret Tan | 21; 7 | 21; 12 |
| 3 | (Brazil) (United States) | Donnians Oliveira; Ryan Ma | 15; 21 | 21; 16 | 21; 19 |
| 4 | (Brazil) (United States) | Izak Batalha / Matheus Voigt; Arthur Lee / Samuel Wales Li | 21; 9 | 19; 21 | 21; 18 |
| 5 | (Brazil) (United States) | Fabrício Farias / Davi Silva; Kelvin Chong / Ryan Ma | 21; 18 | 21; 16 |

==== 5th to 8th place ====
Semi-finals
16 February
Peru | 3
Paraguay | 0
16 February
El Salvador | 0
United States | 3

Final
17 February
Peru | 0
United States | 3
Third place
17 February
Paraguay | 0
El Salvador | 3

===== 5th to 8th playoff =====
Peru
3
Centro Paralímpico Brasileiro, Court 1
16 February 2024, 17:00

Paraguay
0

| | | | 1 | 2 | 3 |
|---|---|---|---|---|---|---|
| 1 | (Peru) (Paraguay) | Sharum Durand; Heitor Liao | 21; 2 | 21; 5 |
| 2 | (Peru) (Paraguay) | Brian Roque; Carlos Guerrero | 21; 2 | 21; 1 |
| 3 | (Peru) (Paraguay) | Alejandro Chueca; Yuji Mochizuki | 21; 7 | 21; 4 |
| 4 | (Peru) (Paraguay) | Brian Roque / Adriano Viale; Carlos Guerrero / Heitor Liao | | | | not played |
| 5 | (Peru) (Paraguay) | Alejandro Chueca / Sharum Durand; Leo Lee / Yuji Mochizuki | | | | not played |

United States
3
Centro Paralímpico Brasileiro, Court 2
16 February 2024, 17:00

El Salvador
0

| | | | 1 | 2 | 3 |
|---|---|---|---|---|---|---|
| 1 | (United States) (El Salvador) | Howard Shu; Javier Alas | 21; 19 | 21; 15 |
| 2 | (United States) (El Salvador) | Enrico Asuncion; Manuel Mejía | 21; 7 | 21; 9 |
| 3 | (United States) (El Salvador) | Kelvin Chong; Melvin Calzadilla | 21; 11 | 21; 11 |
| 4 | (United States) (El Salvador) | Arthur Lee / Samuel Wales Li; Javier Alas / Uriel Canjura | | | | not played |
| 5 | (United States) (El Salvador) | Jeffrey Chang / Kai Chong; Melvin Calzadilla / Manuel Mejía | | | | not played |

===== 5th place =====
United States
3
Centro Paralímpico Brasileiro, Court 2
17 February 2024, 14:00

Peru
0

| | | | 1 | 2 | 3 |
|---|---|---|---|---|---|---|
| 1 | (United States) (Peru) | Howard Shu; Sharum Durand | 21; 19 | 21; 15 |
| 2 | (United States) (Peru) | Ryan Ma; Brian Roque | 21; 7 | 21; 9 |
| 3 | (United States) (Peru) | Nicholas Chiu; Alejandro Chueca | 21; 11 | 21; 11 |
| 4 | (United States) (Peru) | Jeffrey Chang / Kai Chong; Brian Roque / Adriano Viale | | | | not played |
| 5 | (United States) (Peru) | Enrico Asuncion / Kelvin Chong; Alejandro Chueca / Sharum Durand | | | | not played |

===== 7th place =====
El Salvador
3
Centro Paralímpico Brasileiro, Court 4
16 February 2024, 17:00

Paraguay
0

| | | | 1 | 2 | 3 |
|---|---|---|---|---|---|---|
| 1 | (El Salvador) (Paraguay) | Uriel Canjura; Jordan Lee | 21; 5 | 21; 7 |
| 2 | (El Salvador) (Paraguay) | Javier Alas; Heitor Liao | 21; 0 | 21; 2 |
| 3 | (El Salvador) (Paraguay) | Melvin Calzadilla; Yuji Mochizuki | 21; 12 | 21; 17 |
| 4 | (El Salvador) (Paraguay) | Javier Alas / Uriel Canjura; Carlos Guerrero / Heitor Liao | | | | not played |
| 5 | (El Salvador) (Paraguay) | Melvin Calzadilla / Manuel Mejía; Jordan Lee / Yuji Mochizuki | | | | not played |

==== Semi-finals ====
Semi-finals
16 February
Canada | 3
Mexico | 0
16 February
Guatemala
Brazil | w/o

Final
17 February
Canada | 3
Brazil | 0
Third place
17 February
Mexico | w/o
Guatemala

Canada
3
Centro Paralímpico Brasileiro, Court 2
17 February 2024, 09:00

Mexico
0

| | | | 1 | 2 | 3 |
|---|---|---|---|---|---|---|
| 1 | (Canada) (Mexico) | Brian Yang; Armando Gaitán | 21; 9 | 21; 13 |
| 2 | (Canada) (Mexico) | Victor Lai; Luis Montoya | 21; 15 | 21; 16 |
| 3 | (Canada) (Mexico) | Josh Nguyen; Gerardo Saavedra | 21; 6 | 21; 10 |
| 4 | (Canada) (Mexico) | Adam Dong / Nyl Yakura; Job Castillo / Luis Montoya | | | | not played |
| 5 | (Canada) (Mexico) | Kevin Lee / Ty Alexander Lindeman; Armando Gaitán / Gerardo Saavedra | | | | not played |

Brazil
-
Centro Paralímpico Brasileiro, Court 3
17 February 2024, 09:00

Guatemala
Withdrew

| | | 1 | 2 | 3 |
|---|---|---|---|---|
| 1 | (Brazil) (Guatemala) |
| 2 | (Brazil) (Guatemala) |
| 3 | (Brazil) (Guatemala) |
| 4 | (Brazil) (Guatemala) |
| 5 | (Brazil) (Guatemala) |

==== Final ====
Canada
3
Centro Paralímpico Brasileiro, Court 2
18 February 2024, 10:00

Brazil
0

| | | | 1 | 2 | 3 |
|---|---|---|---|---|---|---|
| 1 | (Canada) (Brazil) | Brian Yang; Ygor Coelho | 15; 21 | 21; 14 | 21; 12 |
| 2 | (Canada) (Brazil) | Adam Dong / Nyl Yakura; Fabrício Farias / Davi Silva | 21; 12 | 16; 21 | 21; 18 |
| 3 | (Canada) (Brazil) | Victor Lai; Jonathan Matias | 24; 22 | 13; 21 | 21; 19 |
| 4 | (Canada) (Brazil) | Kevin Lee / Ty Alexander Lindeman; Izak Batalha / Matheus Voigt | | | | not played |
| 5 | (Canada) (Brazil) | Josh Nguyen; Donnians Oliveira | | | | not played |

== Female Cup ==
All times are Brazil Standard Time (UTC−03:00).

=== Group stage ===
==== Group A ====
| Pos | Team | Pld | W | L | MF | MA | MD | GF | GA | GD | PF | PA | PD | Pts | Qualification |
|---|---|---|---|---|---|---|---|---|---|---|---|---|---|---|---|
| 1 | United States | 2 | 2 | 0 | 10 | 0 | +10 | 20 | 0 | +20 | 421 | 247 | +174 | 2 | Semi-finals |
| 2 | Peru | 2 | 1 | 1 | 3 | 7 | −4 | 7 | 15 | −8 | 352 | 429 | −77 | 1 | Semi-finals |
| 3 | Mexico | 2 | 0 | 2 | 2 | 8 | −6 | 5 | 17 | −12 | 347 | 444 | −97 | 0 | 5th–8th place |

Source: TS

United States
5
Centro Paralímpico Brasileiro, Court 3
15 February 2024, 11:00

Peru
0

| | | | 1 | 2 | 3 |
|---|---|---|---|---|---|
| 1 | (United States) (Peru) | Beiwen Zhang; Inés Castillo | 21; 16 | 21; 12 |
| 2 | (United States) (Peru) | Esther Shi; Fernanda Munar | 21; 4 | 21; 18 |
| 3 | (United States) (Peru) | Ella Lin; Namie Miyahira | 21; 14 | 21; 12 |
| 4 | (United States) (Peru) | Francesca Corbett / Allison Lee; Fernanda Munar / Rafaela Munar | 21; 11 | 21; 9 |
| 5 | (United States) (Peru) | Katelin Ngo / Joline Siu; Valeria Chuquimaqui / Namie Miyahira | 21; 11 | 21; 12 |

Peru
3
Centro Paralímpico Brasileiro, Court 2
15 February 2024, 18:00

Mexico
2

| | | | 1 | 2 | 3 |
|---|---|---|---|---|---|
| 1 | (Peru) (Mexico) | Inés Castillo; Vanessa García | 23; 21 | 21; 15 |
| 2 | (Peru) (Mexico) | Fernanda Munar; Haramara Gaitán | 21; 15 | 16; 21 | 20; 22 |
| 3 | (Peru) (Mexico) | Rafaela Munar; Sabrina Solís | 19; 21 | 9; 21 |
| 4 | (Peru) (Mexico) | Inés Castillo / Namie Miyahira; Romina Fregoso / Miriam Rodríguez | 21; 14 | 20; 22 | 21; 17 |
| 5 | (Peru) (Mexico) | Fernanda Munar / Rafaela Munar; Haramara Gaitán / Sabrina Solís | 21; 11 | 21; 19 |

United States
5
Centro Paralímpico Brasileiro, Court 1
16 February 2024, 11:00

Mexico
0

| | | | 1 | 2 | 3 |
|---|---|---|---|---|---|
| 1 | (United States) (Mexico) | Esther Shi; Vanessa García | 21; 9 | 22; 20 |
| 2 | (United States) (Mexico) | Ella Lin; Haramara Gaitán | 21; 12 | 21; 15 |
| 3 | (United States) (Mexico) | Veronica Yang; Sabrina Solís | 21; 17 | 21; 16 |
| 4 | (United States) (Mexico) | Francesca Corbett / Allison Lee; Romina Fregoso / Miriam Rodríguez | 21; 9 | 21; 9 |
| 5 | (United States) (Mexico) | Annie Xu / Kerry Xu; Haramara Gaitán / Sabrina Solís | 21; 9 | 21; 12 |

==== Group B ====
| Pos | Team | Pld | W | L | MF | MA | MD | GF | GA | GD | PF | PA | PD | Pts | Qualification |
|---|---|---|---|---|---|---|---|---|---|---|---|---|---|---|---|
| 1 | Canada | 2 | 2 | 0 | 10 | 0 | +10 | 20 | 1 | +19 | 429 | 209 | +220 | 2 | Semi-finals |
| 2 | Brazil (H) | 2 | 1 | 1 | 5 | 5 | 0 | 11 | 11 | 0 | 367 | 341 | +26 | 1 | Semi-finals |
| 3 | El Salvador | 2 | 0 | 2 | 0 | 10 | −10 | 1 | 20 | −19 | 192 | 438 | −246 | 0 | 5th–6th place |

Source: TS
(H) Host

Canada
5
Centro Paralímpico Brasileiro, Court 2
15 February 2024, 11:00

Brazil
0

| | | | 1 | 2 | 3 |
|---|---|---|---|---|---|
| 1 | (Canada) (Brazil) | Wenyu Zhang; Juliana Vieira | 21; 19 | 9; 21 | 21; 13 |
| 2 | (Canada) (Brazil) | Jeslyn Chow / Eliana Zhang; Jaqueline Lima / Sâmia Lima | 21; 17 | 21; 17 |
| 3 | (Canada) (Brazil) | Rachel Chan; Jeisiane Alves | 21; 8 | 21; 6 |
| 4 | (Canada) (Brazil) | Jackie Dent / Crystal Lai; Tamires Santos / Lohaynny Vicente | 21; 10 | 21; 12 |
| 5 | (Canada) (Brazil) | Talia Ng; Sayane Lima | 21; 5 | 21; 11 |

Brazil
5
Centro Paralímpico Brasileiro, Court 3
15 February 2024, 18:00

El Salvador
0

| | | | 1 | 2 | 3 |
|---|---|---|---|---|---|
| 1 | (Brazil) (El Salvador) | Juliana Vieira; Daniela Hernández | 21; 9 | 21; 4 |
| 2 | (Brazil) (El Salvador) | Sâmia Lima; Gabriela Barrios | 21; 16 | 21; 8 |
| 3 | (Brazil) (El Salvador) | Jeisiane Alves; Fátima Centeno | 21; 13 | 18; 21 | 21; 19 |
| 4 | (Brazil) (El Salvador) | Tamires Santos / Lohaynny Vicente; Gabriela Barrios / Margareth Revelo | 21; 10 | 21; 7 |
| 5 | (Brazil) (El Salvador) | Jaqueline Lima / Sâmia Lima; Fátima Centeno / Daniela Hernández | 21; 11 | 21; 4 |

Canada
5
Centro Paralímpico Brasileiro, Court 3
16 February 2024, 11:00

El Salvador
0

| | | | 1 | 2 | 3 |
|---|---|---|---|---|---|
| 1 | (Canada) (El Salvador) | Rachel Chan; Daniela Hernández | 21; 4 | 21; 7 |
| 2 | (Canada) (El Salvador) | Eliana Zhang; Gabriela Barrios | 21; 9 | 21; 8 |
| 3 | (Canada) (El Salvador) | Jackie Dent; Fátima Centeno | 21; 4 | 21; 6 |
| 4 | (Canada) (El Salvador) | Talia Ng / Wenyu Zhang; Gabriela Barrios / Margareth Revelo | 21; 5 | 21; 7 |
| 5 | (Canada) (El Salvador) | Catherine Choi / Josephine Wu; Fátima Centeno / Daniela Hernández | 21; 12 | 21; 8 |

==== 5th place ====
Mexico
3
Centro Paralímpico Brasileiro, Court 1
17 February 2024, 14:00

El Salvador
0

| | | | 1 | 2 | 3 |
|---|---|---|---|---|---|---|
| 1 | (Mexico) (El Salvador) | Vanessa García; Daniela Hernández | 21; 6 | 21; 5 |
| 2 | (Mexico) (El Salvador) | Sabrina Solís; Gabriela Barrios | 21; 14 | 21; 10 |
| 3 | (Mexico) (El Salvador) | Romina Fregoso; Margareth Revelo | 19; 15 | 9; 6 |
| 4 | (Mexico) (El Salvador) | Romina Fregoso / Miriam Rodríguez; Fátima Centeno / Daniela Hernández | | | | not played |
| 5 | (Mexico) (El Salvador) | Vanessa García / Sabrina Solís; Gabriela Barrios / Margareth Revelo | | | | not played |

==== Semi-finals ====
Semi-finals
16 February
United States | 3
Brazil | 0
16 February
Peru | 0
Canada | 3

Final
17 February
United States | 0
Canada | 3
Third place
17 February
Brazil | 3
Peru | 0

United States
3
Centro Paralímpico Brasileiro, Court 1
17 February 2024, 09:00

Brazil
0

| | | | 1 | 2 | 3 |
|---|---|---|---|---|---|---|
| 1 | (United States) (Brazil) | Beiwen Zhang; Jeisiane Alves | 21; 7 | 21; 7 |
| 2 | (United States) (Brazil) | Esther Shi; Sayane Lima | 21; 9 | 21; 6 |
| 3 | (United States) (Brazil) | Ella Lin; Natalya Geisler | 21; 8 | 21; 18 |
| 4 | (United States) (Brazil) | Annie Xu / Kerry Xu; Jaqueline Lima / Sâmia Lima | | | | not played |
| 5 | (United States) (Brazil) | Francesca Corbett / Allison Lee; Tamires Santos / Lohaynny Vicente | | | | not played |

Canada
3
Centro Paralímpico Brasileiro, Court 3
17 February 2024, 09:00

Peru
0

| | | | 1 | 2 | 3 |
|---|---|---|---|---|---|---|
| 1 | (Canada) (Peru) | Wenyu Zhang; Inés Castillo | 18; 21 | 21; 17 | 22; 20 |
| 2 | (Canada) (Peru) | Rachel Chan; Rafaela Munar | 21; 3 | 21; 11 |
| 3 | (Canada) (Peru) | Talia Ng; Valeria Chuquimaqui | 21; 1 | 21; 7 |
| 4 | (Canada) (Peru) | Catherine Choi / Josephine Wu; Fernanda Munar / Rafaela Munar | | | | not played |
| 5 | (Canada) (Peru) | Jeslyn Chow / Eliana Zhang; Valeria Chuquimaqui / Namie Miyahira | | | | not played |

==== 3rd place ====
Brazil
3
Centro Paralímpico Brasileiro, Court 3
17 February 2024, 09:00

Peru
0

| | | | 1 | 2 | 3 |
|---|---|---|---|---|---|
| 1 | (Brazil) (Peru) | Juliana Vieira; Inés Castillo | 23; 21 | 21; 18 |
| 2 | (Brazil) (Peru) | Sâmia Lima; Fernanda Munar | 21; 10 | 12; 21 | 23; 21 |
| 3 | (Brazil) (Peru) | Jeisiane Alves; Namie Miyahira | 21; 14 | 21; 14 |
| 4 | (Brazil) (Peru) | Jaqueline Lima / Sâmia Lima; Fernanda Munar / Rafaela Munar |
| 5 | (Brazil) (Peru) | Lohaynny Vicente / Juliana Vieira; Inés Castillo / Namie Miyahira |

==== Final ====
United States
0
Centro Paralímpico Brasileiro, Court 2
18 February 2024, 10:00

Canada
3

| | | | 1 | 2 | 3 |
|---|---|---|---|---|---|---|
| 1 | (United States) (Canada) | Esther Shi; Wenyu Zhang | 21; 17 | 17; 21 | 15; 21 |
| 2 | (United States) (Canada) | Joline Siu / Kerry Xu; Catherine Choi / Josephine Wu | 17; 21 | 8; 21 |
| 3 | (United States) (Canada) | Ella Lin; Rachel Chan | 11; 21 | 10; 21 |
| 4 | (United States) (Canada) | Katelin Ngo / Annie Xu; Jackie Dent / Crystal Lai | | | | not played |
| 5 | (United States) (Canada) | Veronica Yang; Talia Ng | | | | not played |
