= 2014 South American Badminton Championships =

Tournament details
- Dates: 8–14 December
- Edition: 9th
- Venue: Complexo Esportivo Pedro Dell'Antonia
- Location: Santo André, São Paulo, Brazil

The 2014 South American Badminton Championships (Portuguese: Campeonato Sul-Americano Adulto de Badminton 2014) was a badminton tournament sanctioned by the South American Badminton Confederation and Badminton Pan America. The individual and mixed team events were held from 8 to 14 December 2014.

The tournament was held at Complexo Esportivo Pedro Dell'Antonia located in Santo André, São Paulo, Brazil. Three countries took part in the tournament.

Brazil regained the team title after defeating Peru and Chile 5–0. Brazil also dominated in the individual events. Cristián Araya became the first Chilean badminton player to win gold at the South American Championships.

== Medal summary ==
=== Medalists ===
Event	Gold	Silver	Bronze
Men's singles	(Chile) Cristián Araya	(Brazil) Aleksander Silva	(Brazil) Thomas Moretti
Men's singles	(Chile) Cristián Araya	(Brazil) Aleksander Silva	(Brazil) Mateus Cutti
Women's singles	(Brazil) Mariana Pedrol Freitas	(Brazil) Gabrielle Cavalcante	(Brazil) Renata Faustino
Women's singles	(Brazil) Mariana Pedrol Freitas	(Brazil) Gabrielle Cavalcante	(Brazil) Paloma da Silva
Men's doubles	(Brazil) Francielton Farias (Brazil) Rodolfo Salles	(Brazil) Lucas Constant (Brazil) Thomas Moretti	(Chile) Cristián Araya (Chile) Iván León
Men's doubles	(Brazil) Francielton Farias (Brazil) Rodolfo Salles	(Brazil) Lucas Constant (Brazil) Thomas Moretti	(Brazil) Pedro Chen (Brazil) Gabriel Gandara
Women's doubles	(Brazil) Thalita Correa (Brazil) Mariana Pedrol Freitas	(Chile) Chou Ting Ting (Chile) Camila Macaya	(Brazil) Thayse Cruz (Brazil) Claudia Low
Women's doubles	(Brazil) Thalita Correa (Brazil) Mariana Pedrol Freitas	(Chile) Chou Ting Ting (Chile) Camila Macaya	(Brazil) Marta Lopes (Brazil) Paloma da Silva
Mixed doubles	(Brazil) Francielton Farias (Brazil) Gabrielle Cavalcante	(Brazil) Thomas Moretti (Brazil) Mariana Pedrol Freitas	(Brazil) Fabrício Duarte (Brazil) Renata Faustino
Mixed doubles	(Brazil) Francielton Farias (Brazil) Gabrielle Cavalcante	(Brazil) Thomas Moretti (Brazil) Mariana Pedrol Freitas	(Brazil) Guilherme Kumasaka (Brazil) Paloma da Silva
Mixed team	Brazil; Ygor Coelho; Lucas Constant; Fabrício Duarte; Gabriel Gandara; Artur Silva Pomoceno; Rodolfo Salles; Fabio Soares; Thalita Correa; Gabrielle Cavalcante; Thayse Cruz; Mariana Pedrol Freitas	Peru; José Guevara; Sebastian Macías; Camila Duany; Camilla García; Daniela Zapata	Chile; Cristián Araya; Nicolas Ferruzola; Iván León; José Undurraga; Niria Baeza; Chou Ting Ting; Camila Macaya

=== Medal table ===
* Host nation (Brazil)

Rank	Nation	Gold	Silver	Bronze	Total
1	Brazil*	5	4	9	18
2	Chile	1	1	2	4
3	Peru	0	1	0	1
Totals (3 entries)		6	6	11	23

== Team event ==
=== Round robin ===
Pos	Team	Pld	W	L	MF	MA	MD	GF	GA	GD	PF	PA	PD	Pts	Qualification
1	Brazil (H)	2	2	0	10	0	+10	20	3	+17	476	301	+175	2	Champions
2	Peru	2	1	1	4	6	−2	10	13	−3	378	428	−50	1	Runners-up
3	Chile	2	0	2	1	9	−8	5	19	−14	346	471	−125	0	Third place

Source: TS
(H) Host

Brazil
5
Complexo Esportivo Pedro Dell'Antonia
Court 1
8 December 2014, 09:00 UTC−3

Peru
0

			1	2	3
1	(Brazil) (Peru)	Ygor Coelho / Mariana Pedrol Freitas; Sebastian Macías / Daniela Zapata	21; 18	21; 11
2	(Brazil) (Peru)	Paloma da Silva; Camilla García	19; 21	21; 18	21; 17
3	(Brazil) (Peru)	Artur Silva Pomoceno; José Guevara	21; 10	21; 12
4	(Brazil) (Peru)	Thalita Correa / Mariana Pedrol Freitas; Camilla García / Daniela Zapata	21; 16	21; 18
5	(Brazil) (Peru)	Ygor Coelho / Fabio Soares; José Guevara / Sebastian Macías	21; 8	21; 5

Brazil
5
Complexo Esportivo Pedro Dell'Antonia
Court 1
8 December 2014, 15:00 UTC−3

Chile
0

			1	2	3
1	(Brazil) (Chile)	Ygor Coelho / Mariana Pedrol Freitas; Iván León / Camila Macaya	21; 10	18; 21	21; 5
2	(Brazil) (Chile)	Artur Silva Pomoceno; José Guevara	21; 5	21; 5
3	(Brazil) (Chile)	Paloma da Silva; Chou Ting Ting	21; 15	21; 11
4	(Brazil) (Chile)	Ygor Coelho / Fabio Soares; Cristián Araya / Iván León	19; 21	21; 8	21; 11
5	(Brazil) (Chile)	Thalita Correa / Thayse Cruz; Chou Ting Ting / Camila Macaya	21; 18	21; 17

Peru
4
Complexo Esportivo Pedro Dell'Antonia
Court 1
9 December 2014, 09:00 UTC−3

Chile
1

			1	2	3
1	(Peru) (Chile)	Sebastian Macías / Daniela Zapata; Cristián Araya / Camila Macaya	11; 21	21; 18	12; 21
2	(Peru) (Chile)	José Guevara; Iván León	21; 14	21; 7
3	(Peru) (Chile)	Camila Duany; Chou Ting Ting	21; 19	21; 13
4	(Peru) (Chile)	Camilla García / Daniela Zapata; Chou Ting Ting / Camila Macaya	12; 21	21; 15	21; 17
5	(Peru) (Chile)	José Guevara / Sebastian Macías; Cristián Araya / Iván León	21; 18	21; 15
