= Fernanda Saponara =

Peruvian badminton player (born 2001)

Fernanda Saponara Rivva
Personal information
- Born: Fernanda Saponara Rivva; 12 July 2001 (age 25) Lima, Peru

Sport
- Country: Peru
- Sport: Badminton
- Handedness: Right

Women's singles & doubles
- Highest ranking: 117 (WS 8 March 2018); 309 (WD 3 August 2021); 306 (XD 9 November 2021)
- Current ranking: 145 (WS 12 February 2022)
Medal record
Women's badminton
Representing Peru
Pan Am Junior Championships
Bronze medal – third place	2018 Salvador, Bahia	Girls' Singles U-19
Bronze medal – third place	2019 Moncton	Girls' Singles U-19
South American Youth Games
Gold medal – first place	2017 Santiago	Girls' Singles U-19
Silver medal – second place	2017 Santiago	Girls' Doubles U-19
Bronze medal – third place	2017 Santiago	Mixed Doubles U-19
South American Championships
Bronze medal – third place	2016 Lima	Mixed Doubles
Silver medal – second place	2017 Rio de Janeiro	Women's Singles
Bronze medal – third place	2017 Rio de Janeiro	Women's Doubles
Silver medal – second place	2018 Lima	Women's Singles
Gold medal – first place	2018 Lima	Girls' Singles U-19
Silver medal – second place	2018 Lima	Girls' Doubles U19
Gold medal – first place	2018 Lima	Mixed Doubles U19
Silver medal – second place	2019 Guayaquil	Women's Singles
Gold medal – first place	2019 Guayaquil	Girls' Singles U-19
Bronze medal – third place	2019 Guayaquil	Girls' Doubles U-19
Gold medal – first place	2019 Guayaquil	Mixed Doubles U-19

Fernanda Saponara Rivva (born July 12, 2001) is a Peruvian female badminton player who competes internationally.

== Early life ==
Her whole family is made up of athletes (especially in basketball), so she started gymnastics and basketball when she was little. She loved these sports, but one day she told her parents that she wanted to practice a racket sport in the summer and enrolled in an academy. That's where she started playing badminton. So at a young age she used to do basketball, gymnastics and badminton at the same time, but at 13 years old she made the decision to dedicate herself only to badminton.

== Career ==
She won the Peru Junior International in March 2016 in the U19 singles event and was runner-up in girls doubles and mixed doubles. In December 2016, Fernanda Saponara Rivva won the Girls' singles U17 event and reached the semi-final in both the mixed doubles U17 and adult event at the 2016 South American Badminton Championships in her hometown Lima.

In February 2017, Fernanda Saponara Rivva represented Peru at the Pan American Badminton Championships held in Santo Domingo, Dominican Republic and helped the Peruvian team win the fourth place in the Pan Am Mixed Team Championships. In March of the same year, she played the Peru International Series and lost with 17–21, 10–21 to the top seed and teammate Daniela Macias in the women's singles semi-final; In the women's doubles semi-final she played with Micaela Flores Vasquez De Velasco and lost 12–21, 19–21 to teammates Inés Castillo and Paula la Torre Regal. In April of the same year, she and Micaela Flores Vasquez De Velasco participated in the Peru International Challenge. In the women's doubles semi-final, they lost 15–21, 8–21 to Jacqueline Lima and Samia Lima, the No. 2 seeds from Brazil. In June of the same year, she played the Guatemala Badminton Future Series and lost 21–23, 18–21 in the women's singles final to the top seed, Guatemala's Nikte Alejandra Sotomayor. In August of the same year, she played the Carebaco International Open and lost 11–21, 21–23 in the women's singles semi-final to the top seed from America Jamie Subandhi.

In October 2017, she won a gold medal for Peru at the II South American Youth Games held at Santiago, Chile beating Brazilian Sania Valeria Passos Lima in the final. She also won a silver medal in doubles and a bronze medal in mixed doubles at the same event. Also in October of the same year, she played the Santo Domingo Open and lost 9-21, 10–21 in the women's singles final to No. 6 seed American Jamie Xu; In the mixed doubles semi-final with her partner Diego Subasti Tocumura, she lost 14–21, 8–21 to the top seeded duo from Cuba Leodannis Martínez / Tahimara Oropeza. In November of the same year, she played the Suriname International and lost 19–21, 8–21 in the women's singles final to the No. 2 seed from Cuba Tahimara Oropeza, reaching her third runner-up singles spot of the year 2017. In the same successful year 2017 she also won the Argentina Junior U-19 International in the doubles and mixed doubles events and was runner-up in the girls' singles event. She won the 2017 Carebaco U19 junior title in the girls' singles and also won the Santo Domingo Junior International 2017 in the mixed doubles event.

In March 2018, Fernanda Saponara Rivva and Micaela Flores Vasquez De Velasco played the Jamaica International and lost to the United States of America pair Jamie Hsu / Jamie Subandhi 13–21, 12–21 in the women's doubles semi-finals. In May of the same year, she attended the Peru Badminton Future Series and lost 12–21, 12–21 to Brazilian star Fabiana Silva in the women's singles semi-final; Together with compatriot Bruno Barrueto Deza the mixed doubles semi-final was lost 19–21, 21–15, 15–21 to No. 2 seeds and teammates Diego Mini / Paula la Torre Regal. In July of the same year, she represented Peru at the Pan Am Junior Badminton Championships held in Salvador, Bahia in Brazil. In the girls' singles semi-finals, she lost 6-21, 14–21 to Wu Xier, the 3rd/4th seed from Canada.

In October 2018, she represented Peru at the 2018 Youth Olympics in Buenos Aires, Argentina, she qualified as #15 in the world junior ranking.

At the Pan Am Junior Badminton Championships 2019 in Moncton, Canada she won a girls' singles U19 bronze medal. She was the only under-19 medallist from outside of the U.S. or Canada. She won four medals at the 2019 South American Badminton Championships in Guayaquil, Ecuador. Winning gold at the girls' singles and mixed doubles U19 events with teammate Nicolas Macias Brandes, silver at the women's singles event and bronze at the girls' doubles U-19 event with compatriot Yue Yang Cao.

== Achievements ==
=== Pan Am Junior Badminton Championships ===
Girls' singles U19
Year	Venue	Opponent	Score	Result
2018	Centro Panamericano e Judo; Salvador, Bahia, Brazil	(Canada) Talia Ng	6-21, 14-21	Bronze
2019	Louis-J.-Robichaud Sport Complex; Moncton, Canada	(United States) Natalie Chi	11–21, 12-21	Bronze

=== South American Badminton Championships ===
Women's singles
Year	Venue	Opponent	Score	Result
2017	Parque Olimpico da Barra; Rio de Janeiro, Brazil	(Peru) Daniela Macías	14–21, 6–21	Silver
2018	Videna; Lima, Peru	(Peru) Daniela Macías	19–21, 12–21	Silver
2019	Coliseo Abel Jimenez Parra; Guayaquil, Ecuador	(Peru) Daniela Macías	13–21, 16–21	Silver

Women's doubles
Year	Venue	Partner	Opponent	Score	Result
2017	Parque Olimpico da Barra; Rio de Janeiro, Brazil	(Peru) Micaela Flores	(Brazil) Fabiana Da Silva (Brazil) Paula Pereira	9-21, 13-21	Bronze

Mixed doubles
Year	Venue	Partner	Opponent	Score	Result
2016	Videna; Lima, Peru	(Peru) Bruno Barrueto	(Peru) Diego Mini (Peru) Luz María Zornoza	15–21, 7-21	Bronze

=== South American Junior Badminton Championships ===
Girls' singles U19
Year	Venue	Opponent	Score	Result
2018	Videna; Lima, Peru	(Peru) Inés Mendoza	21–9, 21-15	Gold
2019	Coliseo Abel Jimenez Parra; Guayaquil, Ecuador	(Peru) Juliana Giraldo	21–14, 21-8	Gold

Girls' doubles U19
Year	Venue	Partner	Opponent	Score	Result
2018	Videna; Lima, Peru	(Peru) Micaela Flores	(Peru) Stefany Chen (Peru) Valeria Wong	18–21, 21–19, 19–21	Bronze
2019	Coliseo Abel Jimenez Parra; Guayaquil, Ecuador	(Peru) Yue Yang Cao	(Peru) Micaela Castillo (Peru) Micaela Flores	16–21, 15–21	Bronze

Mixed doubles U19
Year	Venue	Partner	Opponent	Score	Result
2018	Videna; Lima, Peru	(Peru) Bruno Barrueto	(Brazil) Francisco Brandão (Brazil) Sofia Alonso	21–15, 21-16	Gold
2019	Coliseo Abel Jimenez Parra; Guayaquil, Ecuador	(Peru) Nicolás Macías	(Brazil) Messias Rony (Brazil) Tamires Santos	21–17, 21-17	Gold

=== BWF International Challenge/Series (5 runners-up) ===
Women's singles
Year	Tournament	Opponent	Score	Result
2017	Guatemala Future Series	(Guatemala) Nikté Sotomayor	21–23, 18–21	(silver) Runner-up
2017	Santo Domingo Open	(United States) Jamie Hsu	9–21, 10–21	(silver) Runner-up
2017	Suriname International	(Cuba) Tahimara Oropeza	19–21, 8–21	(silver) Runner-up
2023	Perú Future Series	(Peru) Inés Castillo	10–21, 11–21	(silver) Runner-up

Mixed doubles
Year	Tournament	Partner	Opponent	Score	Result
2026	Perú International	(Italy) Giovanni Toti	(Guatemala) Christopher Martínez (Guatemala) Diana Corleto	21–19, 19–21, 11–21	(silver) Runner-up

BWF International Challenge tournament
BWF International Series tournament
BWF Future Series tournament
