= Ecuador national badminton team =

National badminton team representing Ecuador

Ecuador
- Association: Bádminton Ecuador (BE)
- Confederation: BPA (Pan America)
- President: Santiago Teran Loaiza

BWF ranking
- Current ranking: 52 ▲6 (2 January 2024)
- Highest ranking: 52 (2 January 2024)

Pan Am Mixed Team Championships
- Appearances: 2 (first in 2008)
- Best result: 6th (2023)

The Ecuador national badminton team (Spanish: Equipo nacional de bádminton de Ecuador) represents Ecuador in international badminton team competitions. It is managed by Badminton Ecuador, the governing body for badminton in Ecuador. The Ecuador team competed in the 2008 Pan Am Badminton Championships mixed team event and finished in 9th place.

Ecuador also participates the South American Games. The nation won 2 bronze medals in doubles. The mixed team has yet to enter the quarterfinals of the mixed team event in the Games.

== Participation in Pan American Badminton Championships ==
Mixed team

Year	Result
2008	9th place
2023	6th place

== Participation in South American Games ==
Year	Result
2010	Group stage
2018	Group stage
2022	Group stage

== Junior competitive record ==
=== World Junior Team Championships ===
==== Suhandinata Cup ====
Year	Result
(United States) 2023	Withdrew

=== Pan Am Junior Team Championships ===
==== Mixed team ====
Year	Result
2023	Group stage

== Players ==
=== Current squad ===
As of 2 January 2024

==== Men's team ====
Name	DoB/Age	Ranking of event		
Name	DoB/Age	MS	MD	XD
Henry Huebla	6 December 2005 (age 19)	250	-	160
Emilio Zambrano	4 June 1996 (age 28)	1134	717	973
Andy Baque	3 August 2000 (age 24)	1724	1274	-
Joseph Rodríguez	2 November 2002 (age 22)	-	1274	-

==== Women's team ====
Name	DoB/Age	Ranking of event		
Name	DoB/Age	WS	WD	XD
María Delia Zambrano	25 October 1997 (age 27)	142	756	160
Natalia Román Tapia	12 June 2003 (age 21)	-	756	-
Brittany Navarrete	21 October 2007 (age 17)	-	-	-
Catherine Pluas Choez	19 August 2001 (age 23)	-	-	-
