= 2010 Uber Cup qualification =

Tournament details
- Dates: February 16, 2010 – February 28, 2010
- Venue: BA: Nakhon Ratchasima Sports Complex; BCA: Lugogo Indoor Stadium; BE: Arena Ursynów; BO: Stadium Southland; BPA: Club de Regatas Lima
- Location: BA: Nakhon Ratchasima, Thailand; BCA: Kampala, Uganda; BE: Warsaw, Poland; BO: Invercargill, New Zealand; BPA: Lima, Peru

The 2010 Uber Cup qualification process is a series of tournaments organised by the five BWF confederations to decide 10 of the 12 teams which will play in the 2010 Uber Cup, with Malaysia qualifying automatically as hosts and China trophy holders.

== Qualified teams ==
Country	Confederation	Qualified as	Qualified on	Final appearance
Malaysia	Badminton Asia	2010 Uber Cup hosts	12 September 2008	9th
China	Badminton Asia	2008 Uber Cup winners	16 May 2008	14th
South Africa	Badminton Africa	2010 Uber Cup Preliminaries for Africa winners	23 February 2010	4th
South Korea	Badminton Asia	2010 Badminton Asia Uber Cup Preliminaries winners	27 February 2010	14th
Indonesia	Badminton Asia	2010 Badminton Asia Uber Cup Preliminaries runners-up	27 February 2010	20th
Japan	Badminton Asia	2010 Badminton Asia Uber Cup Preliminaries semifinalists	27 February 2010	16th
India	Badminton Asia	2010 Badminton Asia Uber Cup Preliminaries semifinalists	27 February 2010	3rd
Denmark	Badminton Europe	2010 European Team Championships winners	21 February 2010	16th
Germany	Badminton Europe	2010 European Team Championships third place	21 February 2010	5th
Russia	Badminton Europe	2010 European Team Championships runners-up	21 February 2010	Debut
Australia	Badminton Oceania	2010 Uber Cup Preliminaries for Oceania winners	20 February 2010	4th
United States	Badminton Pan Am	2010 Pan American Uber Cup Preliminaries winners	21 February 2010	9th

== Qualification process ==
The number of teams participating in the final tournament is 12. The allocation of slots for each confederation is the same allocation from 2004 tournament; 4 from Asia, 3 from Europe, and 1 from each Africa, Oceania and Pan Am. Two automatic qualifiers are the host and defending champion.

== Confederation qualification ==
=== Badminton Confederation of Africa ===
The qualification for the African teams was held from 20 to 23 February 2010, at the Lugogo Indoor Stadium in Kampala, Uganda. The winners of the African qualification will qualify for the Uber Cup.

==== Teams in contention ====
Teams qualified for the Group stage

- Burundi
- Egypt
- Ghana
- Kenya
- Mauritius
- Nigeria
- Seychelles
- South Africa
- Uganda

==== First round (group stage) ====
Advance to Knockout stage

Group A

Pos	Team	Pld	Pts
1	South Africa	1	1
2	Burundi	1	0

Source: BWF
Group B

Pos	Team	Pld	Pts
1	Mauritius	2	2
2	Kenya	2	1
3	Ghana	2	0

Source: BWF

Group C

Pos	Team	Pld	Pts
1	Seychelles	1	1
2	Uganda (H)	1	0

Source: BWF
(H) Host
Group D

Pos	Team	Pld	Pts
1	Nigeria	1	1
2	Egypt	1	0

Source: BWF

==== Second round (knockout stage) ====
Quarter-finals
22 February
South Africa	3
Uganda	0
22 February
Kenya	0
Nigeria	3
22 February
Egypt	3
Mauritius	0
22 February
Seychelles
Burundi	w/o

Semi-finals
22 February
South Africa	3
Nigeria	1
22 February
Egypt	3
Burundi	0

Final
23 February
South Africa	3
Egypt	1

=== Badminton Asia ===
The qualification for the Asian teams was held from 22 to 28 February 2010, at the Nakhon Ratchasima Sports Complex in Nakhon Ratchasima, Thailand. The semi-finalists of the Asian qualification will qualify for the Uber Cup.

==== Teams in contention ====
Teams qualified for the Group stage

- Chinese Taipei
- Hong Kong
- India
- Indonesia
- Japan
- Philippines
- Singapore
- South Korea
- Sri Lanka
- Thailand

==== First round (group stage) ====
Advance to Knockout stage

Group X

Pos	Team	Pld	Pts
1	Indonesia	4	4
2	South Korea	4	3
3	Thailand	4	2
4	Singapore	4	1
5	Sri Lanka	4	0

Source: BWF
Group Y

Pos	Team	Pld	Pts
1	Japan	4	4
2	India	4	3
3	Chinese Taipei	4	2
4	Hong Kong	4	1
5	Philippines	4	0

Source: BWF

==== Second round (knockout stage) ====
Semi-finals
X2	South Korea	3
Y1	Japan	1
X1	Indonesia	3
Y2	India	0

Final
X2	South Korea	3
X1	Indonesia	2
Third place
Y1	Japan	3
Y2	India	2

=== Badminton Europe ===
The qualification for the European teams was held from 16 to 21 February 2010, at the Arena Ursynów in Warsaw, Poland. The semi-finalists of the European qualification will qualify for the Uber Cup.

==== Teams in contention ====
Teams qualified for the Group stage

- Belgium
- Belarus
- Bulgaria
- Croatia
- Czech Republic
- Denmark
- England
- Estonia
- Finland
- France
- Germany
- Greece
- Hungary
- Iceland
- Latvia
- Netherlands
- Poland
- Portugal
- Russia
- Scotland
- Slovakia
- Spain
- Sweden
- Ukraine
- Wales

==== First round (group stage) ====
Advance to Knockout stage

Group A
Group B
Group C

Pos	Team	Pld	Pts
1	Denmark	3	3
2	Czech Republic	3	2
3	Estonia	3	1
4	Greece	3	0

Source: BWF

Pos	Team	Pld	Pts
1	Netherlands	4	4
2	Belgium	4	3
3	Belarus	4	2
4	Finland	4	1
5	Latvia	4	0

Source: BWF

Pos	Team	Pld	Pts
1	Russia	3	3
2	England	3	2
3	Portugal	3	1
4	Croatia	3	0

Source: BWF
Group D
Group E
Group F

Pos	Team	Pld	Pts
1	Germany	3	3
2	Spain	3	1
3	Iceland	3	1
4	Sweden	3	1

Source: BWF

Pos	Team	Pld	Pts
1	Scotland	3	2
2	France	3	2
3	Ukraine	3	1
4	Poland (H)	3	1

Source: BWF
(H) Host

Pos	Team	Pld	Pts
1	Bulgaria	3	3
2	Wales	3	2
3	Slovakia	3	1
4	Hungary	3	0

Source: BWF

==== Second round (knockout stage) ====
Quarter-finals
19 February 2010
Denmark
BYE
Germany	3
Bulgaria	0
Scotland	0
Russia	3
BYE
Netherlands

Semi-finals
20 February 2010
Denmark	3
Germany	1
Russia	3
Netherlands	0

Final
21 February 2010
Denmark	3
Russia	2
Third place
21 February 2010
Germany	3
Netherlands	0

=== Badminton Oceania ===
The qualification for the Oceanian teams was held from 19 to 20 February 2010, at the Stadium Southland in Invercargill, New Zealand. The winner of the Oceania qualification will qualify for the Uber Cup.

==== Teams in contention ====
- Australia
- Fiji
- New Caledonia
- New Zealand

==== Round-robin ====
Pos	Team	Pld	Pts
1	Australia	3	3
2	New Zealand (H)	3	2
3	New Caledonia	3	1
4	Fiji	3	0

Source: BWF
(H) Host

=== Badminton Pan Am ===
The qualification for the Pan Am teams was held from 18 to 21 February 2010, at Club de Regatas Lima in Lima, Peru. The winner of the Pan Am qualification will qualify for the Uber Cup.

==== Teams in contention ====
Teams qualified for the Group stage

- Brazil
- Canada
- Colombia
- Dominican Republic
- Jamaica
- Mexico
- Peru
- Puerto Rico
- United States

==== First round (group stage) ====
Advance to Knockout stage

Group X

Pos	Team	Pld	Pts
1	United States	3	3
2	Peru (H)	3	2
3	Brazil	3	1
4	Dominican Republic	3	0

Source: BWF
(H) Host
Group Y

Pos	Team	Pld	Pts
1	Canada	4	4
2	Mexico	4	3
3	Jamaica	4	2
4	Puerto Rico	4	1
5	Colombia	4	0

Source: BWF

==== Second round (knockout stage) ====
Semi-finals
21 February
United States	3
Mexico	0
21 February
Canada	1
Peru	3

Final
21 February
United States	3
Peru	1
