= Bolivia national badminton team =

National badminton team representing Bolivia

Bolivia
- Association: Federación Boliviana de Bádminton (FBB)
- Confederation: BPA (Pan America)
- President: Ivan Tolavi

BWF ranking
- Current ranking: 128 ▼1 (2 April 2024)
- Highest ranking: 125 (2 January 2019)

The Bolivia national badminton team (Spanish: Selección Boliviana de bádminton) represents Bolivia in international badminton team competitions. The Bolivian national team is controlled by Federación Boliviana de Bádminton and is a member of Badminton Pan America and the South American Badminton Confederation.

Badminton in Bolivia was first practiced in 2004. In that same year, the Bolivian Badminton Federation was formed and started sending its first few players to compete in the Copa Pionero provincial badminton championships hosted in Venezuela.

The team first participated internationally at the 2018 South American Games mixed team event where the team was qualified as the host team. The team made their first appearance at the South American Badminton Championships in 2020. The team have yet to qualify for the Thomas Cup, the Uber Cup and the Sudirman Cup.

== History ==
=== Mixed team ===
In 2018, Bolivia hosted the 2018 South American Games which gave the national team qualification as host team for the badminton mixed team event. The team finished at the bottom of the group, losing 5–0 to Brazil and Chile. In 2020, the mixed team then made their first appearance at the South American Team Championships. The team finished in fourth place. In 2022, the mixed team competed in the 2022 Bolivarian Games mixed team event. The team finished in 8th place.

== Competitive record ==
=== Thomas Cup ===
Year	Round	Pos
1949 to 2024	Did not enter	
2026	To be determined	
2028	To be determined	
2030	To be determined	

=== Uber Cup ===
Year	Round	Pos
1957 to 2024	Did not enter	
2026	To be determined	
2028	To be determined	
2030	To be determined	

=== Sudirman Cup ===
Year	Round	Pos
1989 to 2023	Did not enter	
2025	To be determined	
2027	To be determined	
2029	To be determined	

=== Pan American Team Championships ===
==== Men's team ====
Year	Round	Pos
2016 to 2024	Did not enter	
2026	To be determined	
2028	To be determined	
2030	To be determined	

==== Women's team ====
Year	Round	Pos
2016 to 2024	Did not enter	
2026	To be determined	
2028	To be determined	
2030	To be determined	

==== Mixed team ====
Year	Round	Pos
1977 to 2023	Did not enter	
2025	To be determined	
2027	To be determined	
2029	To be determined	

=== South American Games ===
==== Mixed team ====
Year	Round	Pos
2010	Did not enter	
2018	Group stage	6th
2022	Group stage	9th

=== South American Team Championships ===
==== Men's team ====
Year	Round	Pos
1985	Did not enter	
1990	Did not enter	

==== Women's team ====
Year	Round	Pos
1990	Did not enter	

==== Mixed team ====
Year	Round	Pos
1984 to 2019	Did not enter	
2020	Fourth place	4th
2022	Did not enter	
2023	Did not enter	

=== Bolivarian Games ===
==== Mixed team ====
Year	Round	Pos
2009	Did not enter	
2013	Did not enter	
2017	Did not enter	
2022	Quarter-finals	8th

**Red border color indicates tournament was held on home soil.

== Junior competitive record ==
=== Suhandinata Cup ===
Year	Round	Pos
2000 to 2024	Did not enter	
2025	To be determined	

=== Pan American Junior Team Championships ===
==== Mixed team ====
Year	Round	Pos
1977 to 2023	Did not enter	
2024	To be determined	

=== South American Junior Team Championships ===
==== Mixed team ====
Year	Round	Pos
1997 to 2019	Did not enter	
2020	Third place	3rd
2022	Did not enter	
2023	Did not enter	

**Red border color indicates tournament was held on home soil.

== Staff ==
The following list shows the coaching staff for the national badminton team of Bolivia.

Name	Role
(Bolivia) Cindy Avendaño Montes	Coach

== Players ==
=== Current squad ===
As of 2 January 2024

==== Men's team ====
Name	DoB/Age	Ranking of event		
Name	DoB/Age	MS	MD	XD
Henry Mendoza Meruvia	14 May 1998 (age 26)	-	-	-
Ignacio Galarza	27 February 2002 (age 23)	-	-	-

==== Women's team ====
Name	DoB/Age	Ranking of event		
Name	DoB/Age	WS	WD	XD
Juanita Siviora Puro	12 March 1990 (age 35)	559	-	-
Jenommy Mendoza Mamani	23 January 2003 (age 22)	-	-	-

=== Previous squads ===
- South American Games: 2018
- South American Team Championships: 2020
- Bolivarian Games: 2022
