= 2020 South American Badminton Championships =

Tournament details
- Dates: 9–13 December
- Edition: 15th
- Venue: Polideportivo 2 de la Videna
- Location: Lima, Peru

The 2020 South American Badminton Championships (Spanish: Campeonato Sudamericano Adulto de Badminton 2020) was a badminton tournament sanctioned by the South American Badminton Confederation and Badminton Pan America. The individual and mixed team events were held from 9 to 13 December 2020.

The tournament was held at Polideportivo 2 de la Videna located in Lima, Peru. Four countries took part in the tournament.

In the team event, Peru finished in first place, followed by Argentina and Colombia. Debutants Bolivia finished in fourth place. Ecuador withdrew from the championships.

== Medal summary ==
=== Medalists ===
Event	Gold	Silver	Bronze
Men's singles	(Peru) Daniel la Torre	(Peru) Nicolás Macías	(Argentina) Santiago Otero
Men's singles	(Peru) Daniel la Torre	(Peru) Nicolás Macías	(Peru) José Guevara
Women's singles	(Peru) Daniela Macías	(Peru) Inés Castillo	(Peru) Fernanda Munar
Women's singles	(Peru) Daniela Macías	(Peru) Inés Castillo	(Peru) Ariane Nakasone
Men's doubles	(Peru) José Guevara (Peru) Diego Mini	(Peru) Diego Subauste (Peru) Daniel la Torre	(Argentina) Nicolás Oliva (Argentina) Santiago Otero
Men's doubles	(Peru) José Guevara (Peru) Diego Mini	(Peru) Diego Subauste (Peru) Daniel la Torre	(Peru) Nicolás Macías (Peru) Santiago de la Oliva
Women's doubles	(Peru) Daniela Macías (Peru) Dánica Nishimura	(Peru) Inés Castillo (Peru) Paula la Torre	(Peru) Fernanda Munar (Peru) Rafaela Munar
Women's doubles	(Peru) Daniela Macías (Peru) Dánica Nishimura	(Peru) Inés Castillo (Peru) Paula la Torre	(Peru) Mirei Moromisato (Peru) Andrea Flores
Mixed doubles	(Peru) Daniel la Torre (Peru) Paula la Torre	(Peru) Diego Mini (Peru) Dánica Nishimura	(Peru) José Guevara (Peru) Micaela Castillo
Mixed doubles	(Peru) Daniel la Torre (Peru) Paula la Torre	(Peru) Diego Mini (Peru) Dánica Nishimura	(Colombia) Miguel Quirama (Colombia) Juliana Giraldo
Mixed team	Peru; José Guevara; Nicolás Macías; Diego Mini; Santiago de la Oliva; Brian Roque; Diego Subauste; Daniel la Torre; Inés Castillo; Micaela Castillo; Micaela Flores; Daniela Macías; Inés Mendoza; Dánica Nishimura; Ingrid Salas; Fernanda Saponara; Paula la Torre	Argentina; Mateo Jara; Mateo Maira; Nicolás Oliva; Santiago Otero; Ailén Oliva; Iona Gualdi; Pilar Fernández; Yovela Petrucci	Colombia; Jhon Berdugo; Luis Camacho; Mario Quimbaya; Miguel Quirama; Juliana Giraldo; Karen Patiño; María Pérez

=== Medal table ===
* Host nation (Peru)

Rank	Nation	Gold	Silver	Bronze	Total
1	Peru*	6	5	7	18
2	Argentina	0	1	2	3
3	Colombia	0	0	2	2
Totals (3 entries)		6	6	11	23

== Team event ==
=== Round robin ===
Pos	Team	Pld	W	L	MF	MA	MD	GF	GA	GD	PF	PA	PD	Pts	Qualification
1	Peru (H)	3	3	0	15	0	+15	30	0	+30	630	272	+358	3	Champions
2	Argentina	3	2	1	8	7	+1	16	15	+1	501	467	+34	2	Runners-up
3	Colombia	3	1	2	7	8	−1	15	17	−2	520	517	+3	1	Third place
4	Bolivia	3	0	3	0	15	−15	1	30	−29	246	641	−395	0	Fourth place

Source: TS
(H) Host

Colombia
2
Polideportivo 2 de la Videna, Court 1
9 December 2020, 16:00 UTC−5

Argentina
3

			1	2	3
1	(Colombia) (Argentina)	Luis Miguel Camacho; Nicolas Oliva	13; 21	12; 21
2	(Colombia) (Argentina)	Camila Macaya; Yovela Petrucci	21; 9	21; 10
3	(Colombia) (Argentina)	Jhon Berdugo / Miguel Angel Quirama; Nicolas Oliva / Santiago Otero	14; 21	11; 21
4	(Colombia) (Argentina)	Juliana Giraldo / Karen Patiño; Ailén Oliva / Yovela Petrucci	21; 6	21; 18
5	(Colombia) (Argentina)	Luis Miguel Camacho / Karen Patiño; Santiago Otero / Ailén Oliva	18; 21	22; 20	13; 21

Peru
5
Polideportivo 2 de la Videna, Court 2
9 December 2020, 16:00 UTC−5

Bolivia
0

			1	2	3
1	(Peru) (Bolivia)	Diego Subauste / Micaela Flores; Paolo Arauz / Juanita Siviora	21; 4	21; 8
2	(Peru) (Bolivia)	Daniel la Torre Regal; Henry Mendoza Meruvia	21; 6	21; 2
3	(Peru) (Bolivia)	Inés Castillo; Fabiana Tolavi	21; 5	21; 3
4	(Peru) (Bolivia)	Diego Subauste / Santiago de la Oliva; Paolo Arauz / Henry Mendoza Meruvia	21; 13	21; 5
5	(Peru) (Bolivia)	Micaela Castillo / Paula la Torre Regal; Fabiana Tolavi / Juanita Siviora	21; 7	21; 5

Peru
5
Polideportivo 2 de la Videna, Court 1
10 December 2020, 09:00 UTC−5

Colombia
0

			1	2	3
1	(Peru) (Colombia)	Diego Mini / Dánica Nishimura; Jhon Berdugo / Karen Patiño	21; 14	21; 11
2	(Peru) (Colombia)	Daniel la Torre Regal; Miguel Angel Quirama	21; 7	21; 11
3	(Peru) (Colombia)	Inés Castillo; María Julieth Pérez	21; 10	21; 11
4	(Peru) (Colombia)	José Guevara / Diego Mini; Jhon Berdugo / Luis Miguel Camacho	21; 7	21; 8
5	(Peru) (Colombia)	Inés Castillo / Paula la Torre Regal; Fabiana Tolavi / Juanita Siviora	21; 15	21; 17

Argentina
5
Polideportivo 2 de la Videna, Court 2
10 December 2020, 09:00 UTC−5

Bolivia
0

			1	2	3
1	(Argentina) (Bolivia)	Mateo Maira / Iona Gualdi; Paolo Arauz / Juanita Siviora	21; 11	21; 2
2	(Argentina) (Bolivia)	Santiago Otero; Henry Mendoza Meruvia	21; 6	21; 8
3	(Argentina) (Bolivia)	Ailén Oliva; Juanita Siviora	21; 11	21; 9
4	(Argentina) (Bolivia)	Mateo Maira / Santiago Otero; Paolo Arauz / Henry Mendoza Meruvia	21; 3	21; 6
5	(Argentina) (Bolivia)	Ailén Oliva / Yovela Petrucci; Fabiana Tolavi / Juanita Siviora	21; 7	21; 6

Peru
5
Polideportivo 2 de la Videna, Court 1
10 December 2020, 16:00 UTC−5

Argentina
0

			1	2	3
1	(Peru) (Argentina)	José Guevara / Paula la Torre Regal; Mateo Maira / Iona Gualdi	21; 8	21; 5
2	(Peru) (Argentina)	Daniel la Torre Regal; Santiago Otero	21; 10	21; 10
3	(Peru) (Argentina)	Inés Castillo; Ailén Oliva	21; 10	21; 11
4	(Peru) (Argentina)	José Guevara / Diego Mini; Nicolas Oliva / Santiago Otero	21; 18	21; 18
5	(Peru) (Argentina)	Dánica Nishimura / Daniela Macías; Ailén Oliva / Yovela Petrucci	21; 7	21; 6

Colombia
5
Polideportivo 2 de la Videna, Court 2
10 December 2020, 16:00 UTC−5

Bolivia
0

			1	2	3
1	(Colombia) (Bolivia)	Jhon Berdugo / Karen Patiño; Henry Mendoza Meruvia / Fabiana Tolavi	21; 3	21; 6
2	(Colombia) (Bolivia)	Mario Andres Quimbaya; Paolo Arauz	11; 21	21; 17	21; 18
3	(Colombia) (Bolivia)	María Julieth Pérez; Juanita Siviora	21; 6	21; 7
4	(Colombia) (Bolivia)	Mario Andres Quimbaya / Miguel Angel Quirama; Paolo Arauz / Henry Mendoza Meruvia	21; 10	21; 19
5	(Colombia) (Bolivia)	Karen Patiño / María Julieth Pérez; Fabiana Tolavi / Juanita Siviora	21; 8	21; 4
