= Qingzi Ouyang =

Canadian badminton player (born 1999)

Qingzi Ouyang 欧阳晴子
Personal information
- Born: 2 August 1999 (age 27)
- Height: 1.70 m (5 ft 7 in)

Sport
- Country: Canada
- Sport: Badminton
- Handedness: Right

Women's singles
- Career record: 27 wins, 11 losses
- Highest ranking: 259 (13 October 2016)
- BWF profile
Medal record
Women's badminton
Representing Canada
Pan Am Women's Team Championships
Silver medal – second place	2016 Guadalajara	Women's team
Pan Am Junior Championships
Gold medal – first place	2015 Tijuana	Girls' singles
Gold medal – first place	2015 Tijuana	Mixed doubles
Gold medal – first place	2016 Lima	Girls' singles
Gold medal – first place	2016 Lima	Mixed team
Bronze medal – third place	2015 Tijuana	Girls' doubles
Bronze medal – third place	2015 Tijuana	Mixed team

Qingzi Ouyang (born 2 August 1999) is a Canadian former badminton player of Chinese origin who competes in international level events. She is a double Pan Am junior champions in the girls' singles. In the senior event, she won a bronze medal in the women's doubles as well as in the mixed doubles at the 2016 Canadian Championships, and helped Canadian women's team finished as runner-up at the Pan Am Team Championships in Mexico.

== Achievements ==
=== Pan Am Junior Championships ===
Girls' singles
Year	Venue	Opponent	Score	Result
2016	CAR la Videna; Lima, Peru	(United States) Jennie Gai	21–6, 21–9	Gold
2015	Centro de Alto Rendimiento; Tijuana, Mexico	(United States) Jamie Hsu	21–9, 21–15	Gold

Girls' doubles
Year	Venue	Partner	Opponent	Score	Result
2015	Centro de Alto Rendimiento; Tijuana, Mexico	(Canada) Kylie Cheng	(United States) Annie Xu (United States) Kerry Xu	15–21, 19–21	Bronze

Mixed doubles
Year	Venue	Partner	Opponent	Score	Result
2015	Centro de Alto Rendimiento; Tijuana, Mexico	(Canada) Jason Ho-shue	(Canada) Ty Alexander Lindeman (Canada) Takeisha Wang	21–10, 21–15	Gold

=== BWF Junior Tournament ===
Girls' singles
Year	Tournament	Opponent	Score	Result
2015	Canada Junior International	(United States) Crystal Pan	15–21, 21–19, 21–17	(gold) Winner

Mixed doubles
Year	Tournament	Partner	Opponent	Score	Result
2015	Canada Junior International	(Canada) Jason Ho-shue	(Canada) Kevin Lee (Canada) Jenna Wong	21–17, 21–18	(gold) Winner

BWF Junior International Challenge tournament
BWF Junior Future Series tournament
