= 2010 Thomas & Uber Cup Preliminaries for Oceania =

Tournament details
- Dates: 19–20 February
- Nations: 5 (Men's team); 4 (Women's team)
- Venue: Stadium Southland
- Location: Invercargill, New Zealand

The 2010 Thomas & Uber Cup Preliminaries for Oceania was a continental badminton team championships in Oceania sanctioned by the Badminton World Federation. The tournament was held from 19 to 20 February 2010.

== Tournament ==
The 2010 Thomas & Uber Cup Preliminaries for Oceania was a continental team tournament of badminton held to determine the best men's and women's team in Oceania, who would qualify to 2010 Thomas & Uber Cup. This tournament was organized by Badminton Oceania and was sanctioned by the Badminton World Federation.

=== Venue ===
The tournament was held at Stadium Southland in Invercargill, New Zealand.

=== Competition format ===
The competition was held using a half-competition system (round-robin) with each team competing against each other once.

=== Tiebreakers ===
The rankings of teams in each group were determined per BWF Statutes Section 5.1, Article 16.3:

1. Number of matches won;
2. Match result between the teams in question;
3. Match difference in all group matches;
4. Game difference in all group matches;
5. Point difference in all group matches.

== Men's team ==
Pos	Team	Pld	W	L	MF	MA	MD	GF	GA	GD	PF	PA	PD	Pts	Qualification
1	Australia	4	4	0	20	0	+20	40	1	+39	860	394	+466	4	2010 Thomas Cup
2	New Zealand (H)	4	3	1	15	5	+10	31	10	+21	791	471	+320	3	
3	New Caledonia	4	2	2	9	11	−2	19	24	−5	696	777	−81	2	
4	Fiji	4	1	3	3	17	−14	7	36	−29	503	867	−364	1	
5	Tahiti	4	0	4	3	17	−14	9	35	−26	533	874	−341	0	

Source: BWF
(H) Host

=== New Caledonia vs New Zealand ===
New Caledonia
0
Stadium Southland, Court 1
19 February 2010, 09:00 UTC+13

New Zealand
5

			1	2	3
1	(New Caledonia) (New Zealand)	Marc Antoine Desaymoz; Joe Wu	13; 21	18; 21
2	(New Caledonia) (New Zealand)	Fabien Kaddour; James Eunson	9; 21	6; 21
3	(New Caledonia) (New Zealand)	Florian Ferrer; Kevin Dennerly-Minturn	11; 21	18; 21
4	(New Caledonia) (New Zealand)	Sebastien Arias / Marc Antoine Desaymoz; Oliver Leydon-Davis / Henry Tam	6; 21	13; 21
5	(New Caledonia) (New Zealand)	Florian Ferrer / Fabien Kaddour; Kevin Dennerly-Minturn / Joe Wu	13; 21	11; 21

=== Australia vs Tahiti ===
Australia
5
Stadium Southland, Court 2
19 February 2010, 09:00 UTC+13

Tahiti
0

			1	2	3
1	(Australia) (French Polynesia)	Jeff Tho; Frédéric Ploteau	21; 4	21; 9
2	(Australia) (French Polynesia)	Stuart Gomez; Léo Cucuel	21; 2	21; 9
3	(Australia) (French Polynesia)	Stuart Brehaut; Sébastien Bédrune	21; 6	21; 6
4	(Australia) (French Polynesia)	Ross Smith / Glenn Warfe; Léo Cucuel / Rauhiri Goguenheim	21; 10	21; 5
5	(Australia) (French Polynesia)	Raj Veeran / Chad Whitehead; Sébastien Bédrune / Frédéric Ploteau	21; 6	21; 4

=== Australia vs New Caledonia ===
Australia
5
Stadium Southland, Court 3
19 February 2010, 14:00 UTC+13

New Caledonia
0

			1	2	3
1	(Australia) (New Caledonia)	Jeff Tho; Marc Antoine Desaymoz	21; 8	21; 12
2	(Australia) (New Caledonia)	Stuart Gomez; Fabien Kaddour	21; 10	21; 13
3	(Australia) (New Caledonia)	Stuart Brehaut; Florian Ferrer	21; 11	21; 13
4	(Australia) (New Caledonia)	Ross Smith / Glenn Warfe; Sebastien Arias / Marc Antoine Desaymoz	21; 14	21; 8
5	(Australia) (New Caledonia)	Raj Veeran / Chad Whitehead; Florian Ferrer / Fabien Kaddour	21; 7	21; 9

=== Fiji vs Tahiti ===
Fiji
2
Stadium Southland, Court 3
19 February 2010, 14:00 UTC+13

Tahiti
3

			1	2	3
1	(Fiji) (French Polynesia)	Shivnil Chand; Frédéric Ploteau	14; 21	16; 21
2	(Fiji) (French Polynesia)	Burty Molia; Léo Cucuel	21; 13	21; 7
3	(Fiji) (French Polynesia)	Chi Ying Wong; Sébastien Bédrune	21; 13	19; 21	21; 17
4	(Fiji) (French Polynesia)	Shivnil Chand / Burty Molia; Léo Cucuel / Rauhiri Goguenheim	21; 19	14; 21	22; 20
5	(Fiji) (French Polynesia)	Norman Bentley / Chi Ying Wong; Sébastien Bédrune / Frédéric Ploteau	16; 21	7; 21

=== New Caledonia vs Tahiti ===
New Caledonia
3
Stadium Southland, Court 1
19 February 2010, 19:00 UTC+13

Tahiti
2

			1	2	3
1	(New Caledonia) (French Polynesia)	Marc Antoine Desaymoz; Frédéric Ploteau	21; 15	21; 8
2	(New Caledonia) (French Polynesia)	Glenn Gowet; Léo Cucuel	21; 16	19; 21	14; 21
3	(New Caledonia) (French Polynesia)	Sebastien Arias; Sébastien Bédrune	21; 17	21; 16
4	(New Caledonia) (French Polynesia)	Sebastien Arias / Marc Antoine Desaymoz; Léo Cucuel / Rauhiri Goguenheim	21; 17	21; 12
5	(New Caledonia) (French Polynesia)	Florian Ferrer / Fabien Kaddour; Sébastien Bédrune / Frédéric Ploteau	21; 15	21; 21

=== Fiji vs New Zealand ===
Fiji
0
Stadium Southland, Court 2
19 February 2010, 19:00 UTC+13

New Zealand
5

			1	2	3
1	(Fiji) (New Zealand)	Shivnil Chand; Joe Wu	9; 21	4; 21
2	(Fiji) (New Zealand)	Burty Molia; James Eunson	10; 21	8; 21
3	(Fiji) (New Zealand)	Chi Ying Wong; Oliver Leydon-Davis	6; 21	8; 21
4	(Fiji) (New Zealand)	Norman Bentley / Aaron Wong; Kevin Dennerly-Minturn / James Eunson	3; 21	7; 21
5	(Fiji) (New Zealand)	Shivnil Chand / Chi Ying Wong; Oliver Leydon-Davis / Henry Tam	6; 21	3; 21

=== New Zealand vs Tahiti ===
New Zealand
5
Stadium Southland, Court 2
20 February 2010, 09:00 UTC+13

Tahiti
0

			1	2	3
1	(New Zealand) (French Polynesia)	Joe Wu; Sébastien Bédrune	21; 7	21; 5
2	(New Zealand) (French Polynesia)	James Eunson; Rauhiri Goguenheim	21; 8	21; 7
3	(New Zealand) (French Polynesia)	Kevin Dennerly-Minturn; Teiva Livine	21; 5	21; 2
4	(New Zealand) (French Polynesia)	Oliver Leydon-Davis / Henry Tam; Léo Cucuel / Teiva Livine	21; 4	21; 4
5	(New Zealand) (French Polynesia)	Kevin Dennerly-Minturn / James Eunson; Sébastien Bédrune / Frédéric Ploteau	21; 6	21; 11

=== Australia vs Fiji ===
Australia
5
Stadium Southland, Court 3
20 February 2010, 09:00 UTC+13

Fiji
0

			1	2	3
1	(Australia) (Fiji)	Jeff Tho; Shivnil Chand	21; 10	21; 4
2	(Australia) (Fiji)	Stuart Gomez; Burty Molia	21; 12	21; 7
3	(Australia) (Fiji)	Stuart Brehaut; Chi Ying Wong	21; 6	21; 6
4	(Australia) (Fiji)	Ross Smith / Glenn Warfe; Shivnil Chand / Burty Molia	21; 7	21; 11
5	(Australia) (Fiji)	Raj Veeran / Chad Whitehead; Norman Bentley / Aaron Wong	21; 4	21; 0

=== Australia vs New Zealand ===
Australia
5
Stadium Southland, Court 2
20 February 2010, 19:00 UTC+13

New Zealand
0

			1	2	3
1	(Australia) (New Zealand)	Jeff Tho; Joe Wu	22; 20	21; 13
2	(Australia) (New Zealand)	Ross Smith / Glenn Warfe; Oliver Leydon-Davis / Henry Tam	21; 9	21; 14
3	(Australia) (New Zealand)	Stuart Gomez; James Eunson	18; 21	21; 13	22; 20
4	(Australia) (New Zealand)	Jeff Tho / Raj Veeran; Kevin Dennerly-Minturn / Joe Wu	21; 14	21; 11
5	(Australia) (New Zealand)	Stuart Brehaut; Oliver Leydon-Davis	21; 14	21; 12

=== Fiji vs New Caledonia ===
Fiji
0
Stadium Southland, Court 3
20 February 2010, 19:00 UTC+13

New Caledonia
5

			1	2	3
1	(Fiji) (New Caledonia)	Shivnil Chand; Marc Antoine Desaymoz	12; 21	5; 21
2	(Fiji) (New Caledonia)	Burty Molia; Fabien Kaddour	17; 21	21; 18	23; 25
3	(Fiji) (New Caledonia)	Chi Ying Wong; Florian Ferrer	5; 21	16; 21
4	(Fiji) (New Caledonia)	Shivnil Chand / Burty Molia; Sebastien Arias / Marc Antoine Desaymoz	16; 21	17; 21
5	(Fiji) (New Caledonia)	Norman Bentley / Chi Ying Wong; Florian Ferrer / Fabien Kaddour	13; 21	14; 21

== Women's team ==
Pos	Team	Pld	W	L	MF	MA	MD	GF	GA	GD	PF	PA	PD	Pts	Qualification
1	Australia	3	3	0	13	2	+11	27	4	+23	651	260	+391	3	2010 Uber Cup
2	New Zealand (H)	3	2	1	12	3	+9	24	7	+17	595	388	+207	2	
3	New Caledonia	3	1	2	5	10	−5	10	21	−11	362	548	−186	1	
4	Fiji	3	0	3	0	15	−15	1	30	−29	232	644	−412	0	

Source: BWF
(H) Host

=== Australia vs New Caledonia ===
Australia
5
Stadium Southland, Court 3
19 February 2010, 09:00 UTC+13

New Caledonia
0

			1	2	3
1	(Australia) (New Caledonia)	Huang Chia-chi; Johanna Kou	21; 2	21; 3
2	(Australia) (New Caledonia)	Leanne Choo; Cécile Sarengat	21; 5	21; 4
3	(Australia) (New Caledonia)	Erica Pong; Valerie Sarengat	21; 4	21; 5
4	(Australia) (New Caledonia)	Eugenia Tanaka / Kate Wilson-Smith; Johanna Kou / Cécile Sarengat	21; 5	21; 11
5	(Australia) (New Caledonia)	Leanne Choo / Erica Pong; Melissa Sanmoestanom / Valerie Sarengat	21; 8	21; 8

=== Fiji vs New Zealand ===
Fiji
0
Stadium Southland, Court 4
19 February 2010, 09:00 UTC+13

New Zealand
5

			1	2	3
1	(Fiji) (New Zealand)	Andra Whiteside; Jessica Jonggowisastro	11; 21	15; 21
2	(Fiji) (New Zealand)	Danielle Whiteside; Anna Rankin	7; 21	2; 21
3	(Fiji) (New Zealand)	Gabriella Wong; Danielle Tahuri	7; 21	9; 21
4	(Fiji) (New Zealand)	Andra Whiteside / Danielle Whiteside; Donna Haliday / Danielle Tahuri	6; 21	7; 21
5	(Fiji) (New Zealand)	Carline Bentley / Gabriella Wong; Michelle Chan / Jessica Jonggowisastro	6; 21	4; 21

=== New Caledonia vs New Zealand ===
New Caledonia
0
Stadium Southland, Court 3
19 February 2010, 19:00 UTC+13

New Zealand
5

			1	2	3
1	(New Caledonia) (New Zealand)	Johanna Kou; Michelle Chan	11; 21	11; 21
2	(New Caledonia) (New Zealand)	Melissa Sanmoestanom; Jessica Jonggowisastro	13; 21	7; 21
3	(New Caledonia) (New Zealand)	Valerie Sarengat; Anna Rankin	5; 21	8; 21
4	(New Caledonia) (New Zealand)	Johanna Kou / Cécile Sarengat; Donna Haliday / Danielle Tahuri	6; 21	10; 21
5	(New Caledonia) (New Zealand)	Natacha Offlaville / Valerie Sarengat; Jessica Jonggowisastro / Anna Rankin	5; 21	7; 21

=== Australia vs Fiji ===
Australia
5
Stadium Southland, Court 4
19 February 2010, 19:00 UTC+13

Fiji
0

			1	2	3
1	(Australia) (Fiji)	Huang Chia-chi; Andra Whiteside	21; 2	21; 4
2	(Australia) (Fiji)	Leanne Choo; Danielle Whiteside	21; 5	21; 3
3	(Australia) (Fiji)	Erica Pong; Gabriella Wong	21; 4	21; 4
4	(Australia) (Fiji)	Kate Wilson-Smith / Eugenia Tanaka; Andra Whiteside / Danielle Whiteside				w/o
5	(Australia) (Fiji)	Leanne Choo / Erica Pong; Carline Bentley / Gabriella Wong	21; 5	21; 3

=== Australia vs New Zealand ===
Australia
3
Stadium Southland, Court 2
20 February 2010, 14:00 UTC+13

New Zealand
2

			1	2	3
1	(Australia) (New Zealand)	Huang Chia-chi; Michelle Chan	21; 15	21; 9
2	(Australia) (New Zealand)	Leanne Choo; Jessica Jonggowisastro	19; 21	25; 23	26; 28
3	(Australia) (New Zealand)	Erica Pong; Anna Rankin	20; 22	15; 21
4	(Australia) (New Zealand)	Tang Hetian / Huang Chia-chi; Donna Haliday / Danielle Tahuri	21; 8	21; 6
5	(Australia) (New Zealand)	Eugenia Tanaka / Kate Wilson-Smith; Michelle Chan / Jessica Jonggowisastro	21; 13	21; 9

=== Fiji vs New Caledonia ===
Fiji
0
Stadium Southland, Court 3
20 February 2010, 14:00 UTC+13

New Caledonia
5

			1	2	3
1	(Fiji) (New Caledonia)	Andra Whiteside; Johanna Kou	18; 21	21; 23
2	(Fiji) (New Caledonia)	Danielle Whiteside; Melissa Sanmoestanom	21; 12	10; 21	12; 21
3	(Fiji) (New Caledonia)	Gabriella Wong; Cécile Sarengat	14; 21	12; 21
4	(Fiji) (New Caledonia)	Andra Whiteside / Danielle Whiteside; Johanna Kou / Cécile Sarengat				w/o
5	(Fiji) (New Caledonia)	Carline Bentley / Gabriella Wong; Melissa Sanmoestanom / Valerie Sarengat	12; 21	8; 21
