= Liptapanlop Hall =

Indoor sporting arena located in Thailand

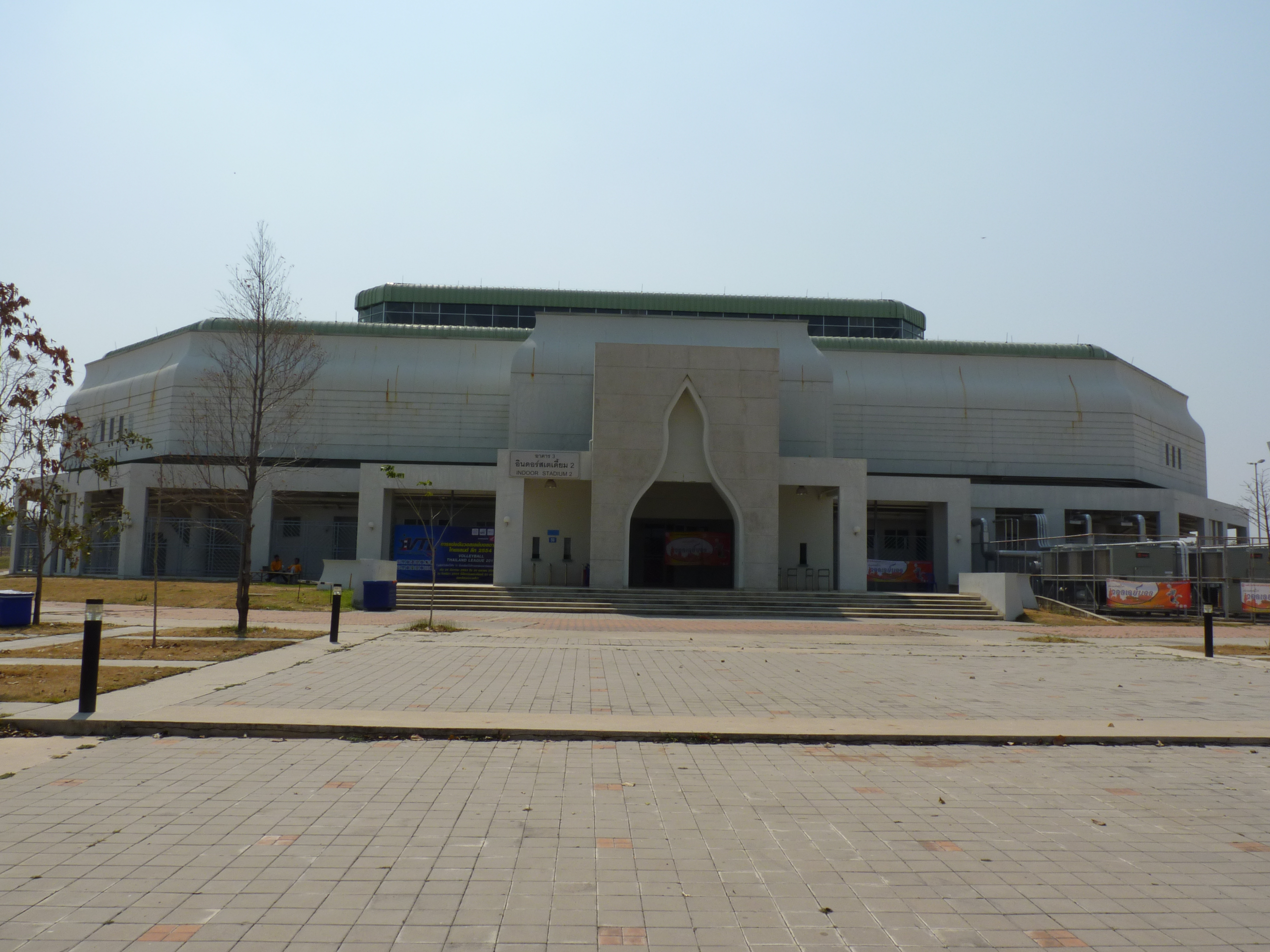
- Interactive map of Liptapanlop Hall
- Location: Nakhon Ratchasima, Thailand
- Coordinates: 14.92614°N 102.04619°E
- Owner: Sports Authority of Thailand (SAT)
- Capacity: 2,000 seats

Construction
- Opened: 2007

Tenants
- 2007 Southeast Asian Games; 2013 FIVB Volleyball Girls' U18 World Championship

Liptapanlop Hall is an indoor sporting arena and located in His Majesty the King's 80th Birthday Anniversary, 5 December 2007, Sports Complex, Nakhon Ratchasima, Thailand. The arena name after the surname of thai politician who official based in Nakhon Ratchasima, Suwat Liptapanlop. The capacity of the arena is 2,000 spectators.

It is used mainly for boxing, basketball, futsal, and volleyball.
