= Badminton at the 2011 Pacific Games =

Badminton at the 2011 Pan American Games

Badminton at the 2011 Pacific Games in Nouméa, New Caledonia was held on September 5–9, 2011.

== Medal summary ==
=== Medal table ===
Rank	Nation	Gold	Silver	Bronze	Total
1	New Caledonia	5	4	3	12
2	Fiji	1	2	2	5
3	Tahiti	0	0	1	1
Totals (3 entries)		6	6	6	18

=== Results ===
Event	Gold	Silver	Bronze
Men's Singles	Marc-Antoine Desaymoz; New Caledonia	Arnaud-Claude Franzi; New Caledonia	William Jannic; New Caledonia
Men's doubles	Arnaude-Claude Franzi and Fabien Kaddour; New Caledonia	Marc-Antoine Desaymoz and Sébastien Arias; New Caledonia	Shivneil Chand and Burty James Molia; Fiji
Women's singles	Andra Whiteside; Fiji	Valérie Sarengat; New Caledonia	Johanna Kou; New Caledonia
Women's doubles	Cécile Kaddour and Johanna Kou; New Caledonia	Danielle Whiteside and Andra Whiteside; Fiji	Valérie Sarengat and Mélissa Sanmoestanom; New Caledonia
Mixed doubles	William Jannic and Cécile Kaddour; New Caledonia	Marc-Antoine Desaymoz and Johanna Kou; New Caledonia	Burty James Molia and Andra Whiteside; Fiji
Mixed team	New Caledonia	Fiji	(French Polynesia) Tahiti
