= 2010 Pan American Thomas & Uber Cup Preliminaries =

Tournament details
- Dates: 18–21 February
- Venue: Club de Regatas Lima
- Location: Lima, Peru

The 2010 Pan American Thomas & Uber Cup Preliminaries was a continental badminton tournament held to determine the teams qualified for the 2010 Thomas & Uber Cup in Pan America. The event was held in Lima, Peru from 18 to 21 February 2010.

== Tournament ==
The 2010 Pan American Thomas & Uber Cup Preliminaries, is a continental team tournament staged to determine the teams in Pan America that are qualified for the 2010 Thomas & Uber Cup. This event was organized by Badminton Pan Am and the Peru Badminton Federation. 20 teams, consisting of 11 men's teams and 9 women's teams entered the tournament.

== Men's team ==
=== Group stage ===
==== Group A ====
| Pos | Team | Pld | W | L | MF | MA | MD | GF | GA | GD | PF | PA | PD | Pts | Qualification |
|---|---|---|---|---|---|---|---|---|---|---|---|---|---|---|---|
| 1 | Guatemala | 4 | 4 | 0 | 18 | 2 | +16 | 37 | 6 | +31 | 880 | 591 | +289 | 4 | Knockout stage |
| 2 | United States | 4 | 3 | 1 | 13 | 7 | +6 | 29 | 15 | +14 | 847 | 607 | +240 | 3 | Knockout stage |
| 3 | Jamaica | 4 | 2 | 2 | 13 | 7 | +6 | 27 | 15 | +12 | 793 | 678 | +115 | 2 | |
| 4 | Puerto Rico | 4 | 1 | 3 | 6 | 14 | −8 | 12 | 29 | −17 | 627 | 724 | −97 | 1 | |
| 5 | Colombia | 4 | 0 | 4 | 0 | 20 | −20 | 0 | 40 | −40 | 293 | 840 | −547 | 0 | |

Source: BWF
- United States vs Colombia

United States
5
Club de Regatas Lima, Court 2
18 February 2010, 08:30 UTC−5

Colombia
0

| | | | 1 | 2 | 3 |
|---|---|---|---|---|---|
| 1 | (United States) (Colombia) | Nicholas Jinadasa; Carlos Muñoz | 21; 7 | 21; 9 |
| 2 | (United States) (Colombia) | Arnold Setiadi; Cristian Vargas | 21; 1 | 21; 6 |
| 3 | (United States) (Colombia) | Daniel Gouw; Sergio Rincón | 21; 8 | 21; 8 |
| 4 | (United States) (Colombia) | Sameera Gunatileka / Vincent Nguy; Carlos Muñoz / Stiven Pulgarín | 21; 4 | 21; 4 |
| 5 | (United States) (Colombia) | Phillip Chew / Sattawat Pongnairat; Sergio Rincón / Cristian Vargas | 21; 8 | 21; 8 |

- Jamaica vs Puerto Rico

Jamaica
5
Club de Regatas Lima, Court 2
18 February 2012, 12:00 UTC−5

Puerto Rico
0

| | | | 1 | 2 | 3 |
|---|---|---|---|---|---|
| 1 | (Jamaica) (Puerto Rico) | Charles Pyne; Héctor Ríos | 21; 10 | 21; 13 |
| 2 | (Jamaica) (Puerto Rico) | Gareth Henry; Fred Hernández | 21; 18 | 21; 18 |
| 3 | (Jamaica) (Puerto Rico) | Garron Palmer; Roman Aleandro | 21; 12 | 21; 13 |
| 4 | (Jamaica) (Puerto Rico) | Anthony McNee / Dennis Coke; Fred Hernández / Héctor Ríos | 21; 15 | 23; 21 |
| 5 | (Jamaica) (Puerto Rico) | Gareth Henry / Garron Palmer; Roman Aleandro / José Mercado | 21; 16 | 21; 14 |

- Guatemala vs Colombia

Guatemala
5
Club de Regatas Lima, Court 4
18 February 2010, 19:00 UTC−5

Colombia
0

| | | | 1 | 2 | 3 |
|---|---|---|---|---|---|
| 1 | (Guatemala) (Colombia) | Kevin Cordón; Carlos Muñoz | 21; 5 | 21; 6 |
| 2 | (Guatemala) (Colombia) | Rodolfo Ramírez; Sergio Rincón | 21; 5 | 21; 6 |
| 3 | (Guatemala) (Colombia) | Pedro Yang; Stiven Pulgarín | 21; 6 | 21; 7 |
| 4 | (Guatemala) (Colombia) | Kevin Cordón / Rodolfo Ramírez; Carlos Muñoz / Stiven Pulgarín | 21; 5 | 21; 4 |
| 5 | (Guatemala) (Colombia) | Erick Anguiano / Pedro Yang; Sergio Rincón / Cristian Vargas | 21; 8 | 21; 12 |

- United States vs Jamaica

United States
3
Club de Regatas Lima, Court 3
19 February 2010, 08:30 UTC−5

Jamaica
2

| | | | 1 | 2 | 3 |
|---|---|---|---|---|---|
| 1 | (United States) (Jamaica) | Nicholas Jinadasa; Charles Pyne | 15; 21 | 19; 21 |
| 2 | (United States) (Jamaica) | Arnold Setiadi; Gareth Henry | 16; 21 | 21; 17 | 17; 21 |
| 3 | (United States) (Jamaica) | Sattawat Pongnairat; Garron Palmer | 21; 17 | 21; 11 |
| 4 | (United States) (Jamaica) | Sameera Gunatileka / Vincent Nguy; Dennis Coke / Charles Pyne | 21; 11 | 21; 13 |
| 5 | (United States) (Jamaica) | Daniel Gouw / Arnold Setiadi; Gareth Henry / Garron Palmer | 21; 10 | 21; 17 |

- Guatemala vs Puerto Rico

Guatemala
5
Club de Regatas Lima, Court 4
19 February 2010, 15:30 UTC−5

Puerto Rico
0

| | | | 1 | 2 | 3 |
|---|---|---|---|---|---|
| 1 | (Guatemala) (Puerto Rico) | Kevin Cordón; José Mercado | 21; 7 | 21; 13 |
| 2 | (Guatemala) (Puerto Rico) | Rodolfo Ramírez; Fred Hernández | 21; 11 | 21; 12 |
| 3 | (Guatemala) (Puerto Rico) | Pedro Yang; Roman Aleandro | 21; 14 | 23; 21 |
| 4 | (Guatemala) (Puerto Rico) | Kevin Cordón / Rodolfo Ramírez; Roman Aleandro / José Mercado | 21; 9 | 21; 14 |
| 5 | (Guatemala) (Puerto Rico) | Erick Anguiano / Pedro Yang; Fred Hernández / Héctor Ríos | 21; 16 | 21; 12 |

- Jamaica vs Colombia

Jamaica
5
Club de Regatas Lima, Court 3
19 February 2010, 19:00 UTC−5

Colombia
0

| | | | 1 | 2 | 3 |
|---|---|---|---|---|---|
| 1 | (Jamaica) (Colombia) | Charles Pyne; Cristian Vargas | 21; 4 | 21; 1 |
| 2 | (Jamaica) (Colombia) | Gareth Henry; Sergio Rincón | 21; 14 | 21; 10 |
| 3 | (Jamaica) (Colombia) | Garron Palmer; Stiven Pulgarín | 21; 6 | 21; 2 |
| 4 | (Jamaica) (Colombia) | Gareth Henry / Garron Palmer; Carlos Muñoz / Sergio Rincón | 21; 9 | 21; 13 |
| 5 | (Jamaica) (Colombia) | Dennis Coke / Anthony McNee; Cristian Vargas / Stiven Pulgarín | 21; 12 | 21; 11 |

- Guatemala vs Jamaica

Guatemala
3
Club de Regatas Lima, Court 3
20 February 2010, 08:30 UTC−5

Jamaica
2

| | | | 1 | 2 | 3 |
|---|---|---|---|---|---|
| 1 | (Guatemala) (Jamaica) | Kevin Cordón; Charles Pyne | 21; 18 | 21; 13 |
| 2 | (Guatemala) (Jamaica) | Rodolfo Ramírez; Gareth Henry | 21; 14 | 21; 12 |
| 3 | (Guatemala) (Jamaica) | Pedro Yang; Garron Palmer | 21; 18 | 20; 22 | 21; 15 |
| 4 | (Guatemala) (Jamaica) | Kevin Cordón / Rodolfo Ramírez; Gareth Henry / Garron Palmer | 24; 26 | 20; 22 |
| 5 | (Guatemala) (Jamaica) | Erick Anguiano / Pedro Yang; Dennis Coke / Charles Pyne | 21; 12 | 21; 19 |

- United States vs Puerto Rico

United States
4
Club de Regatas Lima, Court 4
20 February 2010, 08:30 UTC−5

Puerto Rico
1

| | | | 1 | 2 | 3 |
|---|---|---|---|---|---|
| 1 | (United States) (Puerto Rico) | Arnold Setiadi; José Mercado | 21; 11 | 21; 9 |
| 2 | (United States) (Puerto Rico) | Daniel Gouw; Fred Hernández | 21; 8 | 21; 9 |
| 3 | (United States) (Puerto Rico) | Phillip Chew; Roman Aleandro | 22; 20 | 11; 21 | 15; 21 |
| 4 | (United States) (Puerto Rico) | Sameera Gunatileka / Vincent Nguy; Roman Aleandro / José Mercado | 21; 4 | 21; 14 |
| 5 | (United States) (Puerto Rico) | Phillip Chew / Daniel Gouw; Fred Hernández / Héctor Ríos | 21; 11 | 21; 10 |

- Puerto Rico vs Colombia

Puerto Rico
5
Club de Regatas Lima, Court 1
20 February 2010, 15:30 UTC−5

Colombia
0

| | | | 1 | 2 | 3 |
|---|---|---|---|---|---|
| 1 | (Puerto Rico) (Colombia) | José Mercado; Carlos Muñoz | 21; 6 | 21; 8 |
| 2 | (Puerto Rico) (Colombia) | Héctor Ríos; Cristian Vargas | 21; 3 | 21; 9 |
| 3 | (Puerto Rico) (Colombia) | Roman Aleandro; Sergio Rincón | 21; 12 | 21; 11 |
| 4 | (Puerto Rico) (Colombia) | Fred Hernández / Héctor Ríos; Stiven Pulgarin / Cristian Vargas | 21; 8 | 21; 12 |
| 5 | (Puerto Rico) (Colombia) | Roman Aleandro / José Mercado; Carlos Muñoz / Sergio Rincón | 21; 9 | 21; 6 |

- Guatemala vs United States

Guatemala
4
Club de Regatas Lima, Court 4
20 February 2010, 15:30 UTC−5

United States
1

| | | | 1 | 2 | 3 |
|---|---|---|---|---|---|
| 1 | (Guatemala) (United States) | Kevin Cordón; Nicholas Jinadasa | 21; 4 | 21; 17 |
| 2 | (Guatemala) (United States) | Rodolfo Ramírez; Arnold Setiadi | 22; 20 | 23; 21 |
| 3 | (Guatemala) (United States) | Erick Anguiano; Sattawat Pongnairat | 21; 19 | 10; 21 | 21; 15 |
| 4 | (Guatemala) (United States) | Kevin Cordón / Rodolfo Ramírez; Daniel Gouw / Arnold Setiadi | 21; 14 | 21; 15 |
| 5 | (Guatemala) (United States) | Erick Anguiano / Pedro Yang; Sameera Gunatileka / Vincent Nguy | 21; 19 | 12; 21 | 12; 21 |

==== Group B ====
| Pos | Team | Pld | W | L | MF | MA | MD | GF | GA | GD | PF | PA | PD | Pts | Qualification |
|---|---|---|---|---|---|---|---|---|---|---|---|---|---|---|---|
| 1 | Peru (H) | 5 | 5 | 0 | 23 | 2 | +21 | 37 | 9 | +28 | 917 | 729 | +188 | 5 | Knockout stage |
| 2 | Canada | 5 | 4 | 1 | 20 | 5 | +15 | 43 | 15 | +28 | 1149 | 849 | +300 | 4 | Knockout stage |
| 3 | Cuba | 5 | 3 | 2 | 12 | 13 | −1 | 28 | 31 | −3 | 1044 | 1091 | −47 | 3 | |
| 4 | Brazil | 5 | 2 | 3 | 11 | 14 | −3 | 27 | 30 | −3 | 1008 | 1003 | +5 | 2 | |
| 5 | Mexico | 5 | 1 | 4 | 3 | 17 | −14 | 9 | 35 | −26 | 686 | 885 | −199 | 1 | |
| 6 | Dominican Republic | 5 | 0 | 5 | 1 | 19 | −18 | 5 | 29 | −24 | 450 | 697 | −247 | 0 | |

Source: BWF
(H) Host
- Peru vs Mexico

Peru
5
Club de Regatas Lima, Court 1
18 February 2010, 08:30 UTC−5

Mexico
0

| | | | 1 | 2 | 3 |
|---|---|---|---|---|---|
| 1 | (Peru) (Mexico) | Andrés Corpancho; Salvador Sánchez | 21; 12 | 21; 13 |
| 2 | (Peru) (Mexico) | Mario Cuba; Lino Muñoz | 21; 13 | 21; 17 |
| 3 | (Peru) (Mexico) | Rodrigo Pacheco; José Luis González | 21; 6 | 21; 14 |
| 4 | (Peru) (Mexico) | Mario Cuba / Bruno Monteverde; Lino Muñoz / Salvador Sánchez | 16; 21 | 21; 17 | 21; 17 |
| 5 | (Peru) (Mexico) | Antonio de Vinatea / Martín del Valle; José Luis González / Andrés López | 21; 18 | 21; 14 |

- Canada vs Cuba

Canada
5
Club de Regatas Lima, Court 3
18 February 2010, 08:30 UTC−5

Cuba
0

| | | | 1 | 2 | 3 |
|---|---|---|---|---|---|
| 1 | (Canada) (Cuba) | David Snider; Osleni Guerrero | 21; 14 | 21; 17 |
| 2 | (Canada) (Cuba) | Alex Pang; Alexander Hernández | 21; 8 | 21; 14 |
| 3 | (Canada) (Cuba) | Martin Giuffre; Yendri Peteiro | 21; 17 | 21; 12 |
| 4 | (Canada) (Cuba) | Maxime Bélanger / François Bourret; Alexander Hernández / Osleni Guerrero | 19; 21 | 21; 12 | 21; 18 |
| 5 | (Canada) (Cuba) | Alvin Lau / Jon Vandervet; Yendri Peteiro / Ronald Toledo | 21; 10 | 21; 11 |

- Dominican Republic vs Brazil

Dominican Republic
0
Club de Regatas Lima, Court 4
18 February 2010, 08:30 UTC−5

Brazil
5

| | | | 1 | 2 | 3 |
|---|---|---|---|---|---|
| 1 | (Dominican Republic) (Brazil) | William Cabrera; Daniel Paiola | 6; 21 | 14; 21 |
| 2 | (Dominican Republic) (Brazil) | Alberto Raposo; Hugo Arthuso | 11; 21 | 10; 21 |
| 3 | (Dominican Republic) (Brazil) | Nelson Javier; Alex Yuwan Tjong | 18; 21 | 10; 21 |
| 4 | (Dominican Republic) (Brazil) | William Cabrera / Nelson Javier; Hugo Arthuso / Guilherme Kumasaka | 11; 21 | 7; 21 |
| 5 | (Dominican Republic) (Brazil) | Freddy López / Alberto Raposo; Thomas Moretti / Alex Yuwan Tjong | 9; 21 | 15; 21 |

- Peru vs Cuba

Peru
5
Club de Regatas Lima, Court 1
18 February 2010, 15:30 UTC−5

Cuba
0

| | | | 1 | 2 | 3 |
|---|---|---|---|---|---|
| 1 | (Peru) (Cuba) | Andrés Corpancho; Osleni Guerrero | 21; 19 | 4; 21 | 24; 22 |
| 2 | (Peru) (Cuba) | Bruno Monteverde; Alexander Hernández | 21; 12 | 21; 13 |
| 3 | (Peru) (Cuba) | Rodrigo Pacheco; Ronald Toledo | 21; 16 | 21; 12 |
| 4 | (Peru) (Cuba) | Antonio de Vinatea / Martín del Valle; Alexander Hernández / Yendri Peteiro | 21; 12 | 21; 8 |
| 5 | (Peru) (Cuba) | Bruno Monteverde / Rodrigo Pacheco; Osleni Guerrero / Ronald Toledo | 21; 17 | 21; 13 |

- Brazil vs Mexico

Brazil
4
Club de Regatas Lima, Court 2
18 February 2010, 15:30 UTC−5

Mexico
1

| | | | 1 | 2 | 3 |
|---|---|---|---|---|---|
| 1 | (Brazil) (Mexico) | Daniel Paiola; Salvador Sánchez | 21; 10 | 21; 13 |
| 2 | (Brazil) (Mexico) | Hugo Arthuso; Lino Muñoz | 15; 21 | 21; 16 | 21; 13 |
| 3 | (Brazil) (Mexico) | Thomas Moretti; Andrés López | 21; 19 | 21; 19 |
| 4 | (Brazil) (Mexico) | Hugo Arthuso / Guilherme Kumasaka; José Luis González / Andrés López | 21; 14 | 21; 11 |
| 5 | (Brazil) (Mexico) | Thomas Moretti / Alex Yuwan Tjong; Lino Muñoz / Salvador Sánchez | 17; 21 | 13; 21 |

- Canada vs Dominican Republic

Canada
4
Club de Regatas Lima, Court 3
18 February 2010, 15:30 UTC−5

Dominican Republic
1

| | | | 1 | 2 | 3 |
|---|---|---|---|---|---|
| 1 | (Canada) (Dominican Republic) | Alex Pang; William Cabrera | 21; 14 | 21; 3 |
| 2 | (Canada) (Dominican Republic) | Maxime Bélanger; Nelson Javier | 21; 10 | 20; 22 | 19; 21 |
| 3 | (Canada) (Dominican Republic) | Martin Giuffre; Alberto Raposo | 21; 13 | 21; 9 |
| 4 | (Canada) (Dominican Republic) | Kevin Li / Tommy McKee; William Cabrera / Nelson Javier | 21; 8 | 21; 10 |
| 5 | (Canada) (Dominican Republic) | Alvin Lau / Jon Vandervet; Freddy López / Alberto Raposo | 21; 8 | 21; 7 |

- Peru vs Brazil

Peru
5
Club de Regatas Lima, Court 1
19 February 2010, 08:30 UTC−5

Brazil
0

| | | | 1 | 2 | 3 |
|---|---|---|---|---|---|
| 1 | (Peru) (Brazil) | Andrés Corpancho; Daniel Paiola | 16; 21 | 21; 12 | 21; 17 |
| 2 | (Peru) (Brazil) | Bruno Monteverde; Hugo Arthuso | 21; 18 | 21; 12 |
| 3 | (Peru) (Brazil) | Rodrigo Pacheco; Thomas Moretti | 21; 11 | 21; 12 |
| 4 | (Peru) (Brazil) | Antonio de Vinatea / Martín del Valle; Hugo Arthuso / Guilherme Kumasaka | 24; 22 | 21; 19 |
| 5 | (Peru) (Brazil) | Andrés Corpancho / Bruno Monteverde; Thomas Moretti / Alex Yuwan Tjong | 21; 17 | 21; 14 |

- Canada vs Mexico

Canada
4
Club de Regatas Lima, Court 4
19 February 2010, 08:30 UTC−5

Mexico
1

| | | | 1 | 2 | 3 |
|---|---|---|---|---|---|
| 1 | (Canada) (Mexico) | Alex Pang; Lino Muñoz | 21; 12 | 21; 19 |
| 2 | (Canada) (Mexico) | Tommy McKee; Andrés López | 16; 21 | 17; 21 |
| 3 | (Canada) (Mexico) | Martin Giuffre; Job Castillo | 21; 7 | 21; 10 |
| 4 | (Canada) (Mexico) | Maxime Bélanger / François Bourret; José Luis González / Andrés López | 16; 21 | 21; 11 | 21; 14 |
| 5 | (Canada) (Mexico) | Kevin Li / Jon Vandervet; Lino Muñoz / Salvador Sánchez | 21; 11 | 21; 5 |

- Dominican Republic vs Cuba

Dominican Republic
0
Club de Regatas Lima, Court 2
19 February 2010, 08:30 UTC−5

Cuba
5

| | | | 1 | 2 | 3 |
|---|---|---|---|---|---|
| 1 | (Dominican Republic) (Cuba) | Nelson Javier; Yendri Peteiro | 15; 21 | 21; 17 | 20; 22 |
| 2 | (Dominican Republic) (Cuba) | Alberto Raposo; Ronald Toledo | 18; 21 | 15; 21 |
| 3 | (Dominican Republic) (Cuba) | Freddy López; Ernesto Reyes | 15; 21 | 21; 13 | 19; 21 |
| 4 | (Dominican Republic) (Cuba) | William Cabrera / Nelson Javier; Osleni Guerrero / Alexander Hernández | 21; 18 | 13; 21 | 16; 21 |
| 5 | (Dominican Republic) (Cuba) | Freddy López / Alberto Raposo; Yendri Peteiro / Ronald Toledo | 11; 21 | 9; 21 |

- Peru vs Dominican Republic

Peru
Walkover
Club de Regatas Lima, Court 2
19 February 2010, 15:30 UTC−5

Dominican Republic
-

| | | | 1 | 2 | 3 |
|---|---|---|---|---|---|---|
| 1 | (Peru) (Dominican Republic) | Andrés Corpancho; William Cabrera | | | | w/o |
| 2 | (Peru) (Dominican Republic) | Mario Cuba; Nelson Javier | | | | w/o |
| 3 | (Peru) (Dominican Republic) | Martín del Valle; Alberto Raposo | | | | w/o |
| 4 | (Peru) (Dominican Republic) | Antonio de Vinatea / Martín del Valle; William Cabrera / Nelson Javier | | | | w/o |
| 5 | (Peru) (Dominican Republic) | Andrés Corpancho / Bruno Monteverde; Freddy López / Alberto Raposo | | | | w/o |

- Cuba vs Mexico

Cuba
4
Club de Regatas Lima, Court 3
19 February 2010, 15:30 UTC−5

Mexico
1

| | | | 1 | 2 | 3 |
|---|---|---|---|---|---|
| 1 | (Cuba) (Mexico) | Osleni Guerrero; Salvador Sánchez | 21; 8 | 21; 11 |
| 2 | (Cuba) (Mexico) | Alexander Hernández; Andrés López | 21; 17 | 24; 22 |
| 3 | (Cuba) (Mexico) | Ronald Toledo; José Luis González | 21; 16 | 21; 19 |
| 4 | (Cuba) (Mexico) | Osleni Guerrero / Alexander Hernández; José Luis González / Andrés López | 23; 21 | 22; 20 |
| 5 | (Cuba) (Mexico) | Yendri Peteiro / Ronald Toledo; Lino Muñoz / Salvador Sánchez | 19; 21 | 21; 18 | 15; 21 |

- Canada vs Brazil

Canada
5
Club de Regatas Lima, Court 1
19 February 2010, 15:30 UTC−5

Brazil
0

| | | | 1 | 2 | 3 |
|---|---|---|---|---|---|
| 1 | (Canada) (Brazil) | David Snider; Daniel Paiola | 21; 5 | 21; 17 |
| 2 | (Canada) (Brazil) | Maxime Bélanger; Alex Yuwan Tjong | 21; 15 | 23; 25 | 21; 14 |
| 3 | (Canada) (Brazil) | Martin Giuffre; Thomas Moretti | 15; 21 | 21; 10 | 21; 13 |
| 4 | (Canada) (Brazil) | Alvin Lau / Jon Vandervet; Daniel Paiola / Alex Yuwan Tjong | 21; 13 | 21; 13 |
| 5 | (Canada) (Brazil) | Maxime Bélanger / François Bourret; Guilherme Kumasaka / Thomas Moretti | 21; 16 | 21; 11 |

- Peru vs Canada

Peru
3
Club de Regatas Lima, Court 1
20 February 2010, 08:30 UTC−5

Canada
2

| | | | 1 | 2 | 3 |
|---|---|---|---|---|---|
| 1 | (Peru) (Canada) | Andrés Corpancho; David Snider | 15; 21 | 21; 19 | 14; 21 |
| 2 | (Peru) (Canada) | Bruno Monteverde; Maxime Bélanger | 14; 21 | 21; 17 | 21; 9 |
| 3 | (Peru) (Canada) | Rodrigo Pacheco; Martin Giuffre | 21; 11 | 21; 10 |
| 4 | (Peru) (Canada) | Antonio de Vinatea / Martín del Valle; Maxime Bélanger / François Bourret | 21; 18 | 18; 21 | 21; 17 |
| 5 | (Peru) (Canada) | Andrés Corpancho / Rodrigo Pacheco; Kevin Li / Jon Vandervet | 19; 21 | 18; 21 |

- Brazil vs Cuba

Brazil
2
Club de Regatas Lima, Court 3
20 February 2010, 12:00 UTC−5

Cuba
3

| | | | 1 | 2 | 3 |
|---|---|---|---|---|---|
| 1 | (Brazil) (Cuba) | Daniel Paiola; Osleni Guerrero | 11; 21 | 12; 21 |
| 2 | (Brazil) (Cuba) | Hugo Arthuso; Alexander Hernández | 15; 21 | 21; 13 | 20; 22 |
| 3 | (Brazil) (Cuba) | Thomas Moretti; Ronald Toledo | 21; 12 | 21; 15 |
| 4 | (Brazil) (Cuba) | Hugo Arthuso / Guilherme Kumasaka; Osleni Guerrero / Alexander Hernández | 18; 21 | 21; 18 | 21; 15 |
| 5 | (Brazil) (Cuba) | Daniel Paiola / Alex Yuwan Tjong; Yendri Pietrero / Ronald Toledo | 21; 16 | 16; 21 | 19; 21 |

- Dominican Republic vs Mexico

Dominican Republic
-
Club de Regatas Lima, Court 2
20 February 2010, 12:00 UTC−5

Mexico
Walkover

| | | 1 | 2 | 3 |
|---|---|---|---|---|
| 1 | (Dominican Republic) (Mexico) |
| 2 | (Dominican Republic) (Mexico) |
| 3 | (Dominican Republic) (Mexico) |
| 4 | (Dominican Republic) (Mexico) |
| 5 | (Dominican Republic) (Mexico) |

=== Knockout stage ===
==== Bracket ====
Semi-finals
21 February
United States | 2
Peru | 3
21 February
Canada | 3
Guatemala | 2

Final
21 February
Peru | 3
Canada | 1

==== Semi-finals ====
- United States vs Peru

United States
2
Club de Regatas Lima, Court 1
21 February 2010, 10:00 UTC−5

Peru
3

| | | | 1 | 2 | 3 |
|---|---|---|---|---|---|
| 1 | (United States) (Peru) | Nicholas Jinadasa; Andrés Corpancho | 11; 21 | 19; 21 |
| 2 | (United States) (Peru) | Arnold Setiadi; Bruno Monteverde | 20; 22 | 15; 21 |
| 3 | (United States) (Peru) | Sattawat Pongnairat; Rodrigo Pacheco | 21; 13 | 21; 16 |
| 4 | (United States) (Peru) | Sameera Gunatileka / Vincent Nguy; Antonio de Vinatea / Martín del Valle | 21; 14 | 21; 11 |
| 5 | (United States) (Peru) | Nicholas Jinadasa / Arnold Setiadi; Andrés Corpancho / Rodrigo Pacheco | 17; 21 | 21; 19 | 12; 21 |

- Guatemala vs Canada

Guatemala
2
Club de Regatas Lima, Court 2
21 February 2010, 10:00 UTC−5

Canada
3

| | | | 1 | 2 | 3 |
|---|---|---|---|---|---|
| 1 | (Guatemala) (Canada) | Kevin Cordón; David Snider | 21; 16 | 25; 23 |
| 2 | (Guatemala) (Canada) | Rodolfo Ramírez; Alex Pang | 21; 17 | 21; 19 |
| 3 | (Guatemala) (Canada) | Erick Anguiano; Martin Giuffre | 19; 21 | 15; 21 |
| 4 | (Guatemala) (Canada) | Kevin Cordón / Rodolfo Ramírez; Maxime Bélanger / François Bourret | 22; 24 | 14; 21 |
| 5 | (Guatemala) (Canada) | Erick Anguiano / Pedro Yang; Kevin Li / Jon Vandervet | 23; 21 | 19; 21 | 17; 21 |

==== Third place ====
- Guatemala vs United States

Guatemala
5
Club de Regatas Lima, Court 3
21 February 2010, 16:00 UTC−5

United States
0

| | | | 1 | 2 | 3 |
|---|---|---|---|---|---|---|
| 1 | (Guatemala) (United States) | Kevin Cordón; Nicholas Jinadasa | 21; 12 | 21; 12 |
| 2 | (Guatemala) (United States) | Rodolfo Ramírez; Sattawat Pongnairat | 21; 15 | 21; 17 |
| 3 | (Guatemala) (United States) | Pedro Yang; Daniel Gouw | 21; 19 | 24; 22 |
| 4 | (Guatemala) (United States) | Kevin Cordón / Rodolfo Ramírez; Sameera Gunatileka / Vincent Nguy | | | | not played |
| 5 | (Guatemala) (United States) | Erick Anguiano / Pedro Yang; Phillip Chew / Daniel Gouw | | | | not played |

=== Final ===
- Canada vs Peru

Canada
1
Club de Regatas Lima, Court 1
21 February 2010, 16:00 UTC−5

Peru
3

| | | | 1 | 2 | 3 |
|---|---|---|---|---|---|---|
| 1 | (Canada) (Peru) | David Snider; Andrés Corpancho | 18; 21 | 16; 21 |
| 2 | (Canada) (Peru) | Alex Pang; Bruno Monteverde | 21; 16 | 19; 21 | 21; 17 |
| 3 | (Canada) (Peru) | Martin Giuffre; Rodrigo Pacheco | 13; 21 | 16; 21 |
| 4 | (Canada) (Peru) | Maxime Bélanger / François Bourret; Martín del Valle / Antonio de Vinatea | 17; 21 | 24; 22 | 18; 21 |
| 5 | (Canada) (Peru) | Kevin Li / Jon Vandervet; Andrés Corpancho / Rodrigo Pacheco | | | | not played |

== Women's team ==
=== Group stage ===
==== Group X ====
| Pos | Team | Pld | W | L | MF | MA | MD | GF | GA | GD | PF | PA | PD | Pts | Qualification |
|---|---|---|---|---|---|---|---|---|---|---|---|---|---|---|---|
| 1 | United States | 3 | 3 | 0 | 14 | 1 | +13 | 29 | 4 | +25 | 681 | 405 | +276 | 3 | Knockout stage |
| 2 | Peru (H) | 3 | 2 | 1 | 10 | 5 | +5 | 22 | 11 | +11 | 634 | 502 | +132 | 2 | Knockout stage |
| 3 | Brazil | 3 | 1 | 2 | 6 | 9 | −3 | 12 | 19 | −7 | 501 | 536 | −35 | 1 | |
| 4 | Dominican Republic | 3 | 0 | 3 | 0 | 15 | −15 | 1 | 30 | −29 | 276 | 649 | −373 | 0 | |

Source: BWF
(H) Host
- Peru vs. Brazil

Peru
4
Club de Regatas Lima, Court 1
18 February 2010, 19:00 UTC−5

Brazil
1

| | | | 1 | 2 | 3 |
|---|---|---|---|---|---|
| 1 | (Peru) (Brazil) | Claudia Rivero; Fabiana Silva | 21; 11 | 21; 12 |
| 2 | (Peru) (Brazil) | Cristina Aicardi; Paula Pereira | 21; 13 | 21; 12 |
| 3 | (Peru) (Brazil) | Alejandra Monteverde; Renata Faustino | 21; 10 | 21; 7 |
| 4 | (Peru) (Brazil) | Cristina Aicardi / Claudia Rivero; Marina Eliezer / Thayse Salles | 25; 23 | 23; 21 |
| 5 | (Peru) (Brazil) | Katherine Winder / Claudia Zornoza; Paula Pereira / Fabiana Silva | 14; 21 | 20; 22 |

- United States vs Dominican Republic

United States
5
Club de Regatas Lima, Court 2
18 February 2010, 19:00 UTC−5

Dominican Republic
0

| | | | 1 | 2 | 3 |
|---|---|---|---|---|---|
| 1 | (United States) (Dominican Republic) | Rena Wang; Flordaliza del Oleo | 21; 3 | 21; 11 |
| 2 | (United States) (Dominican Republic) | Iris Wang; Yomaira Sánchez | 21; 11 | 21; 9 |
| 3 | (United States) (Dominican Republic) | Kuei Ya Chen; Orosameli Cabrera | 21; 3 | 21; 3 |
| 4 | (United States) (Dominican Republic) | Eva Lee / Cee Nantana Ketpura; Flordaliza del Oleo / Ana Sánchez | 21; 8 | 21; 1 |
| 5 | (United States) (Dominican Republic) | Priscilla Lun / Mesinee Mangkalakiri; Orosameli Cabrera / Yomaira Sánchez | 21; 12 | 21; 8 |

- United States vs Brazil

United States
5
Club de Regatas Lima, Court 1
19 February 2010, 12:00 UTC−5

Brazil
0

| | | | 1 | 2 | 3 |
|---|---|---|---|---|---|
| 1 | (United States) (Brazil) | Rena Wang; Yasmin Cury | 21; 9 | 21; 11 |
| 2 | (United States) (Brazil) | Eva Lee; Fabiana Silva | 21; 13 | 21; 14 |
| 3 | (United States) (Brazil) | Cee Nantana Ketpura; Renata Faustino | 21; 13 | 21; 15 |
| 4 | (United States) (Brazil) | Eva Lee / Mesinee Mangkalakiri; Marina Eliezer / Fabiana Silva | 21; 7 | 21; 9 |
| 5 | (United States) (Brazil) | Kuei Ya Chen / Priscilla Lun; Paula Pereira / Thayse Salles | 21; 10 | 21; 19 |

- Peru vs Dominican Republic

Peru
5
Club de Regatas Lima, Court 2
19 February 2010, 12:00 UTC−5

Dominican Republic
0

| | | | 1 | 2 | 3 |
|---|---|---|---|---|---|
| 1 | (Peru) (Dominican Republic) | Claudia Rivero; Flordaliza del Oleo | 21; 8 | 21; 11 |
| 2 | (Peru) (Dominican Republic) | Alejandra Monteverde; Yomaira Sánchez | 21; 8 | 21; 11 |
| 3 | (Peru) (Dominican Republic) | Katherine Winder; Orosameli Cabrera | 21; 10 | 21; 4 |
| 4 | (Peru) (Dominican Republic) | Cristina Aicardi / Claudia Zornoza; Orosameli Cabrera / Yomaira Sánchez | 21; 11 | 21; 9 |
| 5 | (Peru) (Dominican Republic) | Alejandra Monteverde / Katherine Winder; Flordaliza del Oleo / Ana Sánchez | 21; 11 | 21; 6 |

- Peru vs United States

Peru
1
Club de Regatas Lima, Court 1
20 February 2010, 12:00 UTC−5

United States
4

| | | | 1 | 2 | 3 |
|---|---|---|---|---|---|
| 1 | (Peru) (United States) | Claudia Rivero; Rena Wang | 12; 21 | 21; 10 | 22; 20 |
| 2 | (Peru) (United States) | Cristina Aicardi; Eva Lee | 9; 21 | 25; 23 | 18; 21 |
| 3 | (Peru) (United States) | Alejandra Monteverde; Cee Nantana Ketpura | 12; 21 | 18; 21 |
| 4 | (Peru) (United States) | Cristina Aicardi / Claudia Rivero; Eva Lee / Mesinee Mangkalakiri | 14; 21 | 18; 21 |
| 5 | (Peru) (United States) | Katherine Winder / Claudia Zornoza; Kuei-Ya Chen / Priscilla Lun | 21; 19 | 11; 21 | 15; 21 |

- Dominican Republic vs Brazil

Dominican Republic
0
Club de Regatas Lima, Court 2
20 February 2010, 12:00 UTC−5

Brazil
5

| | | | 1 | 2 | 3 |
|---|---|---|---|---|---|
| 1 | (Dominican Republic) (Brazil) | Flordaliza del Oleo; Yasmin Cury | 19; 21 | 14; 21 |
| 2 | (Dominican Republic) (Brazil) | Yomaira Sánchez; Fabiana Silva | 8; 21 | 8; 21 |
| 3 | (Dominican Republic) (Brazil) | Orosameli Cabrera; Paula Pereira | 8; 21 | 3; 21 |
| 4 | (Dominican Republic) (Brazil) | Orosameli Cabrera / Yomaira Sánchez; Marina Eliezer / Thayse Salles | 15; 21 | 21; 19 | 7; 21 |
| 5 | (Dominican Republic) (Brazil) | Flordaliza del Oleo / Ana Sánchez; Paula Pereira / Fabiana Silva | 5; 21 | 10; 21 |

==== Group Y ====
| Pos | Team | Pld | W | L | MF | MA | MD | GF | GA | GD | PF | PA | PD | Pts | Qualification |
|---|---|---|---|---|---|---|---|---|---|---|---|---|---|---|---|
| 1 | Canada | 4 | 4 | 0 | 20 | 0 | +20 | 40 | 1 | +39 | 860 | 390 | +470 | 4 | Knockout stage |
| 2 | Mexico | 4 | 3 | 1 | 12 | 8 | +4 | 25 | 17 | +8 | 763 | 597 | +166 | 3 | Knockout stage |
| 3 | Jamaica | 4 | 2 | 2 | 12 | 8 | +4 | 26 | 17 | +9 | 760 | 663 | +97 | 2 | |
| 4 | Puerto Rico | 4 | 1 | 3 | 6 | 14 | −8 | 12 | 28 | −16 | 567 | 711 | −144 | 1 | |
| 5 | Colombia | 4 | 0 | 4 | 0 | 20 | −20 | 0 | 40 | −40 | 251 | 840 | −589 | 0 | |

Source: BWF
- Mexico vs Jamaica

Mexico
3
Club de Regatas Lima, Court 1
18 February 2010, 12:00 UTC−5

Jamaica
2

| | | | 1 | 2 | 3 |
|---|---|---|---|---|---|
| 1 | (Mexico) (Jamaica) | Victoria Montero; Nigella Saunders | 20; 22 | 8; 21 |
| 2 | (Mexico) (Jamaica) | Naty Rangel; Alya Lewis | 17; 21 | 21; 17 | 21; 17 |
| 3 | (Mexico) (Jamaica) | Cynthia González; Carla Grant | 21; 10 | 21; 8 |
| 4 | (Mexico) (Jamaica) | Victoria Montero / Naty Rangel; Alya Lewis / Nigella Saunders | 21; 11 | 17; 21 | 18; 21 |
| 5 | (Mexico) (Jamaica) | Cynthia González / Mariana Ugalde; Carla Grant / Kristal Karjohn | 21; 7 | 21; 6 |

- Colombia vs Puerto Rico

Colombia
0
Club de Regatas Lima, Court 3
18 February 2010, 12:00 UTC−5

Puerto Rico
5

| | | | 1 | 2 | 3 |
|---|---|---|---|---|---|
| 1 | (Colombia) (Puerto Rico) | Lizeth Benavides; Jane González | 15; 21 | 16; 21 |
| 2 | (Colombia) (Puerto Rico) | Laura Sánchez; Daneysha Santana | 3; 21 | 1; 21 |
| 3 | (Colombia) (Puerto Rico) | María Vargas; Irytsha González | 11; 21 | 8; 21 |
| 4 | (Colombia) (Puerto Rico) | Lizeth Benavides / Daniela Blanco; Irytsha González / Daneysha Santana | 4; 21 | 6; 21 |
| 5 | (Colombia) (Puerto Rico) | Laura Sánchez / María Vargas; Jane González / Greish Medina | 11; 21 | 9; 21 |

- Canada vs Jamaica

Canada
5
Club de Regatas Lima, Court 3
18 February 2010, 19:00 UTC−5

Jamaica
0

| | | | 1 | 2 | 3 |
|---|---|---|---|---|---|
| 1 | (Canada) (Jamaica) | Joycelyn Ko; Nigella Saunders | 21; 19 | 17; 21 | 21; 19 |
| 2 | (Canada) (Jamaica) | Phyllis Chan; Alya Lewis | 21; 18 | 21; 15 |
| 3 | (Canada) (Jamaica) | Valérie St. Jacques; Kristal Karjohn | 21; 6 | 21; 10 |
| 4 | (Canada) (Jamaica) | Milaine Cloutier / Valérie St. Jacques; Alya Lewis / Nigella Saunders | 21; 11 | 21; 17 |
| 5 | (Canada) (Jamaica) | Alex Bruce / Michelle Li; Carla Grant / Kristal Karjohn | 21; 9 | 21; 10 |

- Canada vs Puerto Rico

Canada
5
Club de Regatas Lima, Court 3
19 February 2010, 12:00 UTC−5

Puerto Rico
0

| | | | 1 | 2 | 3 |
|---|---|---|---|---|---|
| 1 | (Canada) (Puerto Rico) | Phyllis Chan; Jane González | 21; 2 | 21; 11 |
| 2 | (Canada) (Puerto Rico) | Valérie St. Jacques; Daneysha Santana | 21; 15 | 21; 11 |
| 3 | (Canada) (Puerto Rico) | Michelle Li; Irytsha González | 21; 4 | 21; 3 |
| 4 | (Canada) (Puerto Rico) | Phyllis Chan / Milaine Cloutier; Jane González / Greish Medina | 21; 5 | 21; 4 |
| 5 | (Canada) (Puerto Rico) | Alex Bruce / Michelle Li; Daneysha Santana / Irytsha González | 21; 6 | 21; 9 |

- Mexico vs Colombia

Mexico
5
Club de Regatas Lima, Court 4
19 February 2010, 12:00 UTC−5

Colombia
0

| | | | 1 | 2 | 3 |
|---|---|---|---|---|---|
| 1 | (Mexico) (Colombia) | Naty Rangel; Lizeth Benavides | 21; 3 | 21; 7 |
| 2 | (Mexico) (Colombia) | Mariana Ugalde; María Vargas | 21; 7 | 21; 7 |
| 3 | (Mexico) (Colombia) | Aileen Chinas; Daniela Blanco | 21; 1 | 21; 11 |
| 4 | (Mexico) (Colombia) | Valeria Montero / Victoria Montero; Lizeth Benavides / María Vargas | 21; 6 | 21; 6 |
| 5 | (Mexico) (Colombia) | Cynthia González / Mariana Ugalde; Daniela Blanco / Laura Sánchez | 21; 5 | 21; 8 |

- Mexico vs Puerto Rico

Mexico
4
Club de Regatas Lima, Court 1
19 February 2010, 19:00 UTC−5

Puerto Rico
1

| | | | 1 | 2 | 3 |
|---|---|---|---|---|---|
| 1 | (Mexico) (Puerto Rico) | Victoria Montero; Daneysha Santana | 21; 8 | 21; 16 |
| 2 | (Mexico) (Puerto Rico) | Cynthia González; Irytsha González | 21; 16 | 21; 12 |
| 3 | (Mexico) (Puerto Rico) | Mariana Ugalde; Greish Medina | 21; 13 | 21; 6 |
| 4 | (Mexico) (Puerto Rico) | Valeria Montero / Victoria Montero; Irytsha González / Daneysha Santana | 20; 22 | 16; 21 |
| 5 | (Mexico) (Puerto Rico) | Naty Rangel / Aileen Chinas; Greish Medina / Jane González | 21; 14 | 21; 13 |

- Colombia vs Jamaica

Colombia
0
Club de Regatas Lima, Court 2
19 February 2010, 19:00 UTC−5

Jamaica
5

| | | | 1 | 2 | 3 |
|---|---|---|---|---|---|
| 1 | (Colombia) (Jamaica) | Laura Sánchez; Nigella Saunders | 3; 21 | 3; 21 |
| 2 | (Colombia) (Jamaica) | María Vargas; Alya Lewis | 8; 21 | 6; 21 |
| 3 | (Colombia) (Jamaica) | Daniela Blanco; Kristal Karjohn | 13; 21 | 5; 21 |
| 4 | (Colombia) (Jamaica) | Daniela Blanco / María Vargas; Alya Lewis / Nigella Saunders | 7; 21 | 8; 21 |
| 5 | (Colombia) (Jamaica) | Lizeth Benavides / Laura Sánchez; Carla Grant / Kristal Karjohn | 6; 21 | 4; 21 |

- Canada vs Colombia

Canada
5
Club de Regatas Lima, Court 2
20 February 2010, 08:30 UTC−5

Colombia
0

| | | | 1 | 2 | 3 |
|---|---|---|---|---|---|
| 1 | (Canada) (Colombia) | Phyllis Chan; Lizeth Benavides | 21; 1 | 21; 3 |
| 2 | (Canada) (Colombia) | Alex Bruce; Laura Sánchez | 21; 2 | 21; 1 |
| 3 | (Canada) (Colombia) | Michelle Li; María Vargas | 21; 4 | 21; 5 |
| 4 | (Canada) (Colombia) | Milaine Cloutier / Valérie St. Jacques; Lizeth Benavides / María Vargas | 21; 5 | 21; 4 |
| 5 | (Canada) (Colombia) | Alex Bruce / Michelle Li; Daniela Blanco / Laura Sánchez | 21; 9 | 21; 9 |

- Canada vs Mexico

Canada
5
Club de Regatas Lima, Court 3
20 February 2010, 15:30 UTC−5

Mexico
0

| | | | 1 | 2 | 3 |
|---|---|---|---|---|---|
| 1 | (Canada) (Mexico) | Joycelyn Ko; Victoria Montero | 21; 14 | 21; 12 |
| 2 | (Canada) (Mexico) | Phyllis Chan; Naty Rangel | 21; 12 | 21; 8 |
| 3 | (Canada) (Mexico) | Michelle Li; Cynthia González | 21; 7 | 21; 8 |
| 4 | (Canada) (Mexico) | Milaine Cloutier / Valérie St. Jacques; Victoria Montero / Naty Rangel | 21; 13 | 24; 22 |
| 5 | (Canada) (Mexico) | Alex Bruce / Michelle Li; Cynthia González / Mariana Ugalde | 21; 13 | 21; 13 |

- Puerto Rico vs Jamaica

Puerto Rico
0
Club de Regatas Lima, Court 4
20 February 2010, 15:30 UTC−5

Jamaica
5

| | | | 1 | 2 | 3 |
|---|---|---|---|---|---|
| 1 | (Puerto Rico) (Jamaica) | Daneysha Santana; Nigella Saunders | 11; 21 | 20; 22 |
| 2 | (Puerto Rico) (Jamaica) | Irytsha González; Alya Lewis | 14; 21 | 21; 23 |
| 3 | (Puerto Rico) (Jamaica) | Greish Medina; Kristal Karjohn | 10; 21 | 7; 21 |
| 4 | (Puerto Rico) (Jamaica) | Irytsha González / Daneysha Santana; Alya Lewis / Nigella Saunders | 16; 21 | 19; 21 |
| 5 | (Puerto Rico) (Jamaica) | Jane González / Greish Medina; Carla Grant / Kristal Karjohn | 14; 21 | 14; 21 |

=== Knockout stage ===
==== Bracket ====
Semi-finals
21 February
United States | 3
Mexico | 0
21 February
Canada | 1
Peru | 3

Final
21 February
United States | 3
Peru | 1

==== Semi-finals ====
- United States vs Mexico

United States
3
Club de Regatas Lima, Court 4
21 February 2010, 10:00 UTC−5

Mexico
0

| | | | 1 | 2 | 3 |
|---|---|---|---|---|---|---|
| 1 | (United States) (Mexico) | Rena Wang; Victoria Montero | 21; 10 | 21; 8 |
| 2 | (United States) (Mexico) | Kuei Ya Chen; Naty Rangel | 21; 15 | 21; 7 |
| 3 | (United States) (Mexico) | Cee Nantana Ketpura; Mariana Ugalde | 18; 21 | 21; 17 | 21; 11 |
| 4 | (United States) (Mexico) | Eva Lee / Mesinee Mangkalakiri; Valeria Montero / Victoria Montero | | | | not played |
| 5 | (United States) (Mexico) | Kuei Ya Chen / Priscilla Lun; Cynthia González / Naty Rangel | | | | not played |

- Peru vs Canada

Peru
3
Club de Regatas Lima, Court 3
21 February 2010, 10:00 UTC−5

Canada
1

| | | | 1 | 2 | 3 |
|---|---|---|---|---|---|---|
| 1 | (Peru) (Canada) | Claudia Rivero; Joycelyn Ko | 24; 22 | 16; 21 | 22; 20 |
| 2 | (Peru) (Canada) | Cristina Aicardi; Phyllis Chan | 21; 15 | 21; 15 |
| 3 | (Peru) (Canada) | Alejandra Monteverde; Michelle Li | 11; 21 | 14; 21 |
| 4 | (Peru) (Canada) | Cristina Aicardi / Claudia Rivero; Milaine Cloutier / Valérie St. Jacques | 21; 16 | 21; 13 |
| 5 | (Peru) (Canada) | Katherine Winder / Claudia Zornoza; Alex Bruce / Michelle Li | | | | not played |

==== Third place ====
- Mexico vs Canada

Mexico
0
Club de Regatas Lima, Court 4
21 February 2010, 16:00 UTC−5

Canada
3

| | | | 1 | 2 | 3 |
|---|---|---|---|---|---|---|
| 1 | (Mexico) (Canada) | Victoria Montero; Joycelyn Ko | 20; 22 | 8; 21 |
| 2 | (Mexico) (Canada) | Naty Rangel; Valérie St. Jacques | 15; 21 | 13; 21 |
| 3 | (Mexico) (Canada) | Mariana Ugalde; Michelle Li | 11; 21 | 9; 21 |
| 4 | (Mexico) (Canada) | Victoria Montero / Naty Rangel; Alex Bruce / Michelle Li | | | | not played |
| 5 | (Mexico) (Canada) | Cynthia González / Mariana Ugalde; Joycelyn Ko / Phyllis Chan | | | | not played |

=== Final ===
- United States vs Peru

United States
3
Club de Regatas Lima, Court 2
21 February 2010, 16:00 UTC−5

Peru
1

| | | | 1 | 2 | 3 |
|---|---|---|---|---|---|---|
| 1 | (United States) (Peru) | Rena Wang; Claudia Rivero | 24; 22 | 17; 21 | 14; 21 |
| 2 | (United States) (Peru) | Eva Lee; Cristina Aicardi | 21; 4 | 21; 18 |
| 3 | (United States) (Peru) | Cee Nantana Ketpura; Alejandra Monteverde | 21; 9 | 21; 16 |
| 4 | (United States) (Peru) | Eva Lee / Mesinee Mangkalariki; Cristina Aicardi / Claudia Rivero | 21; 14 | 21; 8 |
| 5 | (United States) (Peru) | Kuei Ya Chen / Priscilla Lun; Katherine Winder / Claudia Zornoza | | | | not played |
