= Johanna Kou =

New Caledonian badminton player

Personal information
- Born: 31 July 1975 (age 51) New Caledonia
- Height: 1.60 m (5 ft 3 in)

Sport
- Country: New Caledonia
- Sport: Badminton
- Handedness: Right

Women's singles & doubles
- Highest ranking: 240 (WS 3 May 2012); 198 (WD 22 July 2010); 200 (XD 29 June 2016)
- BWF profile
Medal record
Women's badminton
Representing New Caledonia
Pacific Games
Gold medal – first place	2007 Samoa	Women's doubles
Gold medal – first place	2007 Samoa	Mixed doubles
Gold medal – first place	2007 Samoa	Mixed team
Gold medal – first place	2011 New Caledonia	Women's doubles
Gold medal – first place	2011 New Caledonia	Mixed team
Gold medal – first place	2019 Samoa	Women's doubles
Silver medal – second place	2003 Suva	Mixed team
Silver medal – second place	2007 Samoa	Women's singles
Silver medal – second place	2011 New Caledonia	Mixed doubles
Silver medal – second place	2019 Samoa	Mixed team
Bronze medal – third place	2011 New Caledonia	Women's singles
Bronze medal – third place	2019 Samoa	Mixed doubles
Oceania Mixed Team Championships
Bronze medal – third place	2008 Nouméa	Mixed team
Bronze medal – third place	2014 Ballarat	Mixed team
Bronze medal – third place	2019 Melbourne	Mixed team
Bronze medal – third place	2023 Auckland	Mixed team
Oceania Women's Team Championships
Bronze medal – third place	2010 Invercargill	Women's team
Bronze medal – third place	2012 Ballarat	Women's team
Bronze medal – third place	2016 Auckland	Women's team
Bronze medal – third place	2020 Ballarat	Women's team
Pacific Mini Games
Silver medal – second place	2022 Saipan	Mixed team
Silver medal – second place	2022 Saipan	Women's doubles

Johanna Kou (born 31 July 1975) is a New Caledonian badminton player. In 2009, she won the women's singles event at the Tahiti International tournament. She competed in four Pacific Games with the acquired of six gold, 4 silver and 2 bronze medals.

== Achievements ==
=== Pacific Games ===
Women's singles
Year	Venue	Opponent	Score	Result
2007	Gymnasium at Apia Park, Apia, Samoa	(Fiji) Andra Whiteside	21–16, 17–21, 17–21	Silver
2011	François Anewy; Nouméa, New Caledonia	(New Caledonia) Cécile Kaddour	11–21, 21–19, 21–9	Bronze

Women's doubles
Year	Venue	Partner	Opponent	Score	Result
2007	Gymnasium at Apia Park; Apia, Samoa	Cécile Sarengat	(Fiji) Danielle Whiteside (Fiji) Andra Whiteside	18–21, 21–12, 21–8	Gold
2011	François Anewy; Nouméa, New Caledonia	(New Caledonia) Cécile Kaddour	(Fiji) Danielle Whiteside (Fiji) Andra Whiteside	21–14, 21–19	Gold
2019	Faleata Sports Complex; Tuanaimato, Samoa	(New Caledonia) Dgeniva Matauli	(Fiji) Karyn Gibson (Fiji) Andra Whiteside	21–17, 21–13	Gold

Mixed doubles
Year	Venue	Partner	Opponent	Score	Result
2007	Gymnasium at Apia Park; Apia, Samoa	Marc-Antoine Desaymoz	(Fiji) Ryan Fong (Fiji) Danielle Whiteside	Walkover	Gold
2011	François Anewy; Nouméa, New Caledonia	(New Caledonia) Marc-Antoine Desaymoz	(New Caledonia) William Jannic (New Caledonia) Cécile Kaddour	11–21, 21–11, 15–21	Silver
2019	Faleata Sports Complex; Tuanaimato, Samoa	(New Caledonia) Morgan Paitio	(New Caledonia) Yohan de Geoffroy (New Caledonia) Cecilia Moussy	21–15, 21–10	Bronze

=== Pacific Mini Games ===
Women's doubles
Year	Venue	Partner	Opponent	Score	Result
2022	Gilbert C. Ada Gymnasium; Saipan, Northern Mariana Islands	(New Caledonia) Marine Souviat	(French Polynesia) Jenica Lesourd (French Polynesia) Mélissa Mi You	6–21, 17–21	Silver

=== BWF International Challenge/Series (4 titles, 4 runners-up) ===
Women's singles
Year	Tournament	Opponent	Score	Result
2010	Fiji International	(Italy) Agnese Allegrini	3–21, 4–21	(silver) Runner-up
2011	Fiji International	(Fiji) Andra Whiteside	7–21, 18–21	(silver) Runner-up

Women's doubles
Year	Tournament	Partner	Opponent	Score	Result
2010	Nouméa International	(New Caledonia) Cecile Kaddour	(New Caledonia) Cathy Camerota (New Caledonia) Melissa Sanmoestanom	22–20, 21–16	(gold) Winner
2011	Fiji International	(New Caledonia) Cecile Kaddour	(Fiji) Andra Whiteside (Fiji) Danielle Whiteside	21–19, 21–10	(gold) Winner
2015	New Caledonia International	(New Zealand) Maria Masinipeni	(New Caledonia) Julie Derne (New Caledonia) Cecilia Moussy	21–11, 21–13	(gold) Winner

Mixed doubles
Year	Tournament	Partner	Opponent	Score	Result
2010	Fiji International	(New Caledonia) Arnaud Franzi	(New Caledonia) William Jannic (New Caledonia) Cecile Kaddour	26–24, 21–18	(gold) Winner
2011	Fiji International	(New Caledonia) Arnaud Franzi	(Australia) Brent Munday (New Zealand) Ashleigh Karl	17–21, 16–21	(silver) Runner-up
2015	New Caledonia International	(New Caledonia) Loic Mennesson	(New Zealand) Shane Masinipeni (New Zealand) Maria Masinipeni	10–21, 13–21	(silver) Runner-up

BWF International Challenge tournament
BWF International Series tournament
BWF Future Series tournament
