= Badminton at the 2010 South American Games – Mixed team =

The 'Mixed Team event at the 2010 South American Games was held over March 19–20. The seven teams were split into 2 groups, with the best two advancing to the semifinals. The contests

== Medalists ==
Gold	Silver	Bronze
Cristina Aicardi; Andres Eduardo Fort; Antonio Juan Estrada; Bruno Guillen; Rodrigo Pacheco; Claudia Rivero; Katherine Cochella; Claudia Zornoza; Peru	Hugo Arthuso; Yasmin Cury; Marina Eliezer; Daniel Paiola; Paula Pereira; Fabiana Silva; Alex Tjong; Brazil	Crystal Leefmans; Queenie Pawirosemito; Virgil Soeroredjo; Mitchel Wongsodikromo; Suriname

== Results ==
=== Group stage ===
==== Group A ====
Team	Contest				Matches			Games		
Team	Pts	Pld	W	L	W	L	Rt	W	L	Rt
Peru	2	2	2	0	10	0	Max	20	0	Max
Argentina	1	2	1	1	4	6	0.667	9	13	0.692
Colombia	0	0	2	2	1	9	0.111	3	19	0.158

2010-03-19
Argentina	4 – 1	Colombia
Peru	5 – 0	Colombia
2010-03-20
Peru	5 – 0	Argentina

==== Group B ====
Team	Contest				Matches			Games		
Team	Pts	Pld	W	L	W	L	Rt	W	L	Rt
Brazil	3	3	3	0	14	1	14.000	28	5	5.600
Suriname	2	3	2	1	8	7	1.143	17	15	1.133
Chile	1	3	1	2	5	10	0.500	12	21	0.571
Ecuador	0	3	0	3	3	12	0.250	8	24	0.333

2010-03-19
Chile	3 – 2	Ecuador
Brazil	4 – 1	Suriname
Brazil	5 – 0	Ecuador
Chile	2 – 3	Suriname
2010-03-20
Brazil	5 – 0	Chile
Ecuador	1 – 4	Suriname

=== Semifinals ===
March 20, 2010	Argentina	0 – 3	Brazil
	Peru	3 – 0	Suriname

=== Final ===
==== 5th place ====
March 20, 2010	Colombia	0 – 3	Chile

==== 3rd Place ====
March 20, 2010	Suriname	3 – o	Argentina

Suriname
3
Medellín, Colombia
March 20, 2010

Argentina
0

			1	2	3
1	(Suriname) (Argentina)	Quennie Pawirosemito / Mitchel Wongsodikromo; Joaquin Berrios / Lorena Bugallo Castro	21; 17	21; 10
2	(Suriname) (Argentina)	Virgil Soeroredjo; Franco Monaco	21; 12	21; 4
3	(Suriname) (Argentina)	Crystal Leefmans; Celina Juarez	21; 10	21; 9

==== Final ====
March 20, 2010	Peru	3 – 1	Brazil

Peru
3
Medellín, Colombia
March 20, 2010

Brazil
1

			1	2	3
1	(Peru) (Brazil)	Rodrigo Pacheco Carrilo / Claudia Rivero; Hugo Arthuso / Fabiana Silva	14; 21	22; 24
2	(Peru) (Brazil)	Cristina Aicardi; Paula Pereira	21; 17	21; 13
3	(Peru) (Brazil)	Andres Eduardo Fort; Daniel Paiola	23; 21	21; 19
4	(Peru) (Brazil)	Cristina Aicardi / Claudia Rivero; Paula Pereira / Fabiana Silva	21; 9	22; 20
