= Andra Whiteside =

Fijian squash and badminton player

Personal information
- Born: 6 December 1989 (age 36) Suva, Fiji
- Height: 1.68 m (5 ft 6 in)
- Weight: 54 kg (119 lb)

Sport
- Country: Fiji
- Sport: Badminton
- Handedness: Right

Women's singles & doubles
- Highest ranking: 201 (WD 23 September 2010)
- BWF profile
Medal record
Representing Fiji
Women's badminton
Pacific Games
Gold medal – first place	2007 Samoa	Women's singles
Gold medal – first place	2011 New Caledonia	Women's singles
Gold medal – first place	2019 Samoa	Mixed team
Gold medal – first place	2019 Samoa	Women's doubles
Silver medal – second place	2011 New Caledonia	Women's doubles
Silver medal – second place	2011 New Caledonia	Mixed team
Silver medal – second place	2007 Samoa	Women's doubles
Silver medal – second place	2007 Samoa	Mixed team
Bronze medal – third place	2011 New Caledonia	Mixed doubles
Oceania Women's Team Championships
Bronze medal – third place	2018 Hamilton	Women's team
Oceania Mixed Team Championships
Bronze medal – third place	2010 Invercargill	Mixed team
Women's squash
Bronze medal – third place	2015 Papua New Guinea	Women's team

Andra Whiteside (born 6 December 1989) is a Fijian squash and badminton player. She has represented Fiji in badminton at the 2006, 2018 Commonwealth Games and at the 2007, 2011, and 2019 Pacific Games. She also represented Fiji in squash at the 2015 Pacific Games. She plays as the third singles against Tahiti, helps the team to clinched the bronze medal.

On 3 September 2014, Whiteside won the National Squash Championships as her first major squash appearance, defeating Sharon Wild three to nothing. In September 2016, she won three National Badminton Championships titles in Suva's Yat Sen Hall for women's singles, women's doubles with her sister, Karen Whiteside, against Chloe Kumar and Shannon Quai Hoi, and the mixed doubles A-grade with Jason Low against Martin Feussner and Sina Quai Hoi. Some time in that year, she began to train newer badminton players and coach them, and played against Danielle Whiteside, her cousin, on 25 June 2016 in the Woman's A Singles for that year, defeating her.

In 2009, Whiteside was nominated by the Fiji Badminton Association and selected by FASANOC to join Peter Taylor as representatives of Fiji for the 2008 Olympic Youth Camp, held from 5–19 August 2008.

== Achievements ==
=== Pacific Games ===
Women's singles
Year	Venue	Opponent	Score	Result
2007	Gymnasium at Apia Park, Apia, Samoa	Johanna Kou	16–21, 21–17, 21–17	Gold
2011	François Anewy; Nouméa, New Caledonia	(New Caledonia) Valérie Sarengat	21–13, 21–6	Gold

Women's doubles
Year	Venue	Partner	Opponent	Score	Result
2007	Gymnasium at Apia Park; Apia, Samoa	(Fiji) Danielle Whiteside	Johanna Kou; Cecile Sarengat	21–18, 12–21, 8–21	Silver
2011	François Anewy; Nouméa, New Caledonia	(Fiji) Danielle Whiteside	(New Caledonia) Cécile Kaddour (New Caledonia) Johanna Kou	14–21, 19–21	Silver
2019	Faleata Sports Complex; Tuanaimato, Samoa	(Fiji) Karyn Gibson	(New Caledonia) Johanna Kou (New Caledonia) Dgeniva Matauli	17–21, 13–21	Silver

Mixed doubles
Year	Venue	Partner	Opponent	Score	Result
2011	François Anewy; Nouméa, New Caledonia	(Fiji) Burty Molia	(New Caledonia) Sébastien Arias (New Caledonia) Melissa Sanmoestanom	21–18, 21–11	Bronze

=== BWF International Challenge/Series ===
Women's singles
Year	Tournament	Opponent	Score	Result
2011	Fiji International	(New Caledonia) Johanna Kou	21–7, 21–18	(gold) Winner

Women's doubles
Year	Tournament	Partner	Opponent	Score	Result
2010	Fiji International	(Fiji) Danielle Whiteside	(Fiji) Carline Bentley (Fiji) Gabriella Wong	21–10, 21–15	(gold) Winner
2011	Fiji International	(Fiji) Danielle Whiteside	(New Caledonia) Cécile Kaddour (New Caledonia) Johanna Kou	19–21, 10–21	(silver) Runner-up

BWF International Challenge tournament
BWF International Series tournament
BWF Future Series tournament
