= Colombia national badminton team =

National badminton team representing Colombia

Colombia
- Association: Bádminton Colombiano (BC)
- Confederation: BPA (Pan America)
- President: Andres Tigreros

BWF ranking
- Current ranking: 94 ▲6 (2 January 2024)
- Highest ranking: 69 (6 October 2011)

Pan Am Mixed Team Championships
- Appearances: 1 (first in 2019)
- Best result: Group stage

Pan Am Men's Team Championships
- Appearances: 1 (first in 2010)
- Best result: Group stage

Pan Am Women's Team Championships
- Appearances: 1 (first in 2010)
- Best result: Group stage

The Colombia national badminton team (Spanish: Equipo nacional de bádminton de Colombia) represents Colombia in international badminton team competitions. The national team is controlled and administered by the Bádminton Colombia, the governing body for Colombian badminton located in the capital city of Medellín. The Colombian men's and women's team debuted in the Pan American Badminton Championships in 2010.

The mixed team competed in the 2019 Pan Am Badminton Championships. They were eliminated in the group stages and finished in 9th place on the classification ranking.

== Competitive record ==
=== Thomas Cup ===
Year	Round	Pos
1949	Did not enter	
1952	Did not enter	
1955	Did not enter	
1958	Did not enter	
1961	Did not enter	
1964	Did not enter	
1967	Did not enter	
1970	Did not enter	
1973	Did not enter	
1976	Did not enter	
1979	Did not enter	
1982	Did not enter	
1984	Did not enter	
1986	Did not enter	
1988	Did not enter	
1990	Did not enter	
1992	Did not enter	
1994	Did not enter	
1996	Did not enter	
1998	Did not enter	
2000	Did not enter	
2002	Did not enter	
2004	Did not enter	
2006	Did not enter	
2008	Did not enter	
2010	Did not qualify	
2012	Did not enter	
2014	Did not enter	
2016	Did not enter	
2018	Did not enter	
2020	Did not enter	
2022	Did not enter	
2024	Did not enter	
2026	Did not qualify	
2028	TBD	
2030	TBD	

=== Uber Cup ===
Year	Round	Pos
1957	Did not enter	
1960	Did not enter	
1963	Did not enter	
1966	Did not enter	
1969	Did not enter	
1972	Did not enter	
1975	Did not enter	
1978	Did not enter	
1981	Did not enter	
1984	Did not enter	
1986	Did not enter	
1988	Did not enter	
1990	Did not enter	
1992	Did not enter	
1994	Did not enter	
1996	Did not enter	
1998	Did not enter	
2000	Did not enter	
2002	Did not enter	
2004	Did not enter	
2006	Did not enter	
2008	Did not enter	
2010	Did not qualify	
2012	Did not enter	
2014	Did not enter	
2016	Did not enter	
2018	Did not enter	
2020	Did not enter	
2022	Did not enter	
2024	Did not enter	
2026	Did not qualify	
2028	TBD	
2030	TBD	

=== Sudirman Cup ===
Year	Round	Pos
1989	Did not enter	
1991	Did not enter	
1993	Did not enter	
1995	Did not enter	
1997	Did not enter	
1999	Did not enter	
2001	Did not enter	
2003	Did not enter	
2005	Did not enter	
2007	Did not enter	
2009	Did not enter	
2011	Did not enter	
2013	Did not enter	
2015	Did not enter	
2017	Did not enter	
2019	Did not enter	
2021	Did not enter	
2023	Did not enter	
2025	TBD	
2027	TBD	
2029	TBD	

=== Pan American Team Championships ===
==== Men's team ====
Year	Round	Pos
2004	Did not enter	
2006	Did not enter	
2008	Did not enter	
2010	Group stage	
2012	Did not enter	
2016	Did not enter	
2018	Did not enter	
2020	Did not enter	
2022	Did not enter	
2024	Did not enter	
2026	Group stage	8th
2028	TBD	
2030	TBD	

==== Women's team ====
Year	Round	Pos
2004	Did not enter	
2006	Did not enter	
2008	Did not enter	
2010	Group stage	
2012	Did not enter	
2016	Did not enter	
2018	Did not enter	
2020	Did not enter	
2022	Did not enter	
2024	Did not enter	
2026	Group stage	8th
2028	TBD	
2030	TBD	

==== Mixed team ====
Year	Round	Pos
1977	Did not enter	
1978	Did not enter	
1979	Did not enter	
1980	Did not enter	
1987	Did not enter	
1989	Did not enter	
1991	Did not enter	
1993	Did not enter	
1997	Did not enter	
2001	Did not enter	
2004	Did not enter	
2005	Did not enter	
2007	Did not enter	
2008	Did not enter	
2009	Did not enter	
2010	Did not enter	
2012	Did not enter	
2013	Did not enter	
2014	Did not enter	
2016	Did not enter	
2017	Did not enter	
2019	Group stage	9th
2023	Did not enter	
2025	TBD	
2027	TBD	
2029	TBD	

=== South American Games ===
==== Mixed team ====
Year	Round	Pos
2010	Group stage	6th
2018	Did not enter	
2022	Third place	3rd

=== South American Team Championships ===
==== Mixed team ====
Year	Round	Pos
1984	Did not enter	
1985	Did not enter	
1988	Did not enter	
1990	Did not enter	
1996	Did not enter	
1998	Did not enter	
2012	Did not enter	
2013	Fourth place	4th
2014	Did not enter	
2015	Did not enter	
2016	Did not enter	
2017	Did not enter	
2018	Did not enter	
2019	Group stage	6th
2020	Did not enter	
2022	Third place	3rd
2023	Quarter-finals	5th

=== Bolivarian Games ===
==== Mixed team ====
Year	Round	Pos
2009	Did not enter	
2013	Group stage	
2017	Group stage	
2022	Runners-up	2nd

**Red border color indicates tournament was held on home soil.

== Junior competitive record ==
=== Suhandinata Cup ===
Year	Round	Pos
2000	Did not enter	
2002	Did not enter	
2004	Did not enter	
2006	Did not enter	
2007	Did not enter	
2008	Did not enter	
2009	Did not enter	
2010	Did not enter	
2011	Did not enter	
2012	Did not enter	
2013	Did not enter	
2014	Did not enter	
2015	Group stage	38th
2016	Did not enter	
2017	Did not enter	
2018	Did not enter	
2019	Did not enter	
2022	Did not enter	
2023	Did not enter	
2024	TBD	

=== Pan American Junior Team Championships ===
==== Mixed team ====
Year	Round	Pos
1977	Did not enter	
1980	Did not enter	
1981	Did not enter	
1988	Did not enter	
1990	Did not enter	
1991	Did not enter	
1992	Did not enter	
1994	Did not enter	
1996	Did not enter	
1998	Did not enter	
2000	Did not enter	
2002	Did not enter	
2004	Did not enter	
2006	Did not enter	
2007	Did not enter	
2008	Did not enter	
2009	Did not enter	
2010	Did not enter	
2011	Did not enter	
2012	Did not enter	
2013	Group stage	11th
2014	Did not enter	
2015	Did not enter	
2016	Group stage	11th
2017	Did not enter	
2018	Did not enter	
2019	Did not enter	
2021	Fifth place	5th
2022	Did not enter	
2023	Did not enter	
2024	Did not enter	
2025	Group stage	9th

=== South American Junior Team Championships ===
==== Mixed team ====
Year	Round	Pos
2012	Did not enter	
2013	Fifth place	5th
2014	Did not enter	
2015	Did not enter	
2016	Did not enter	
2017	Did not enter	
2018	Did not enter	
2019	Did not enter	
2021	Group stage	5th
2022	Did not enter	
2023	Did not enter	
2024	Did not enter	
2025	Group stage	9th
2026	Group stage	8th

**Red border color indicates tournament was held on home soil.

== Players ==
=== Current squad ===
As of 2 January 2024

==== Men's team ====
Name	DoB/Age	Ranking of event		
Name	DoB/Age	MS	MD	XD
Miguel Quirama	9 July 2002 (age 24)	393	717	539
Daniel Borja	28 September 2003 (age 22)	1339	717	740
Daine Marulanda	15 September 2000 (age 25)	1057	403	740
Jhon Berdugo	7 May 1995 (age 31)	1339	403	740

==== Women's team ====
Name	DoB/Age	Ranking of event		
Name	DoB/Age	WS	WD	XD
Juliana Giraldo	30 May 2002 (age 24)	586	-	-
Maria Pérez	4 April 1999 (age 27)	-	-	-
Sara Ávila	18 January 2003 (age 23)	586	589	740
laura Londoño	25 February 1997 (age 29)	459	589	539
