= Nakhon Ratchasima Sports Complex =

Sports facility in Nakhon Ratchasima, Thailand

Coordinates: 14°55′37.24″N 102°02′51.24″E

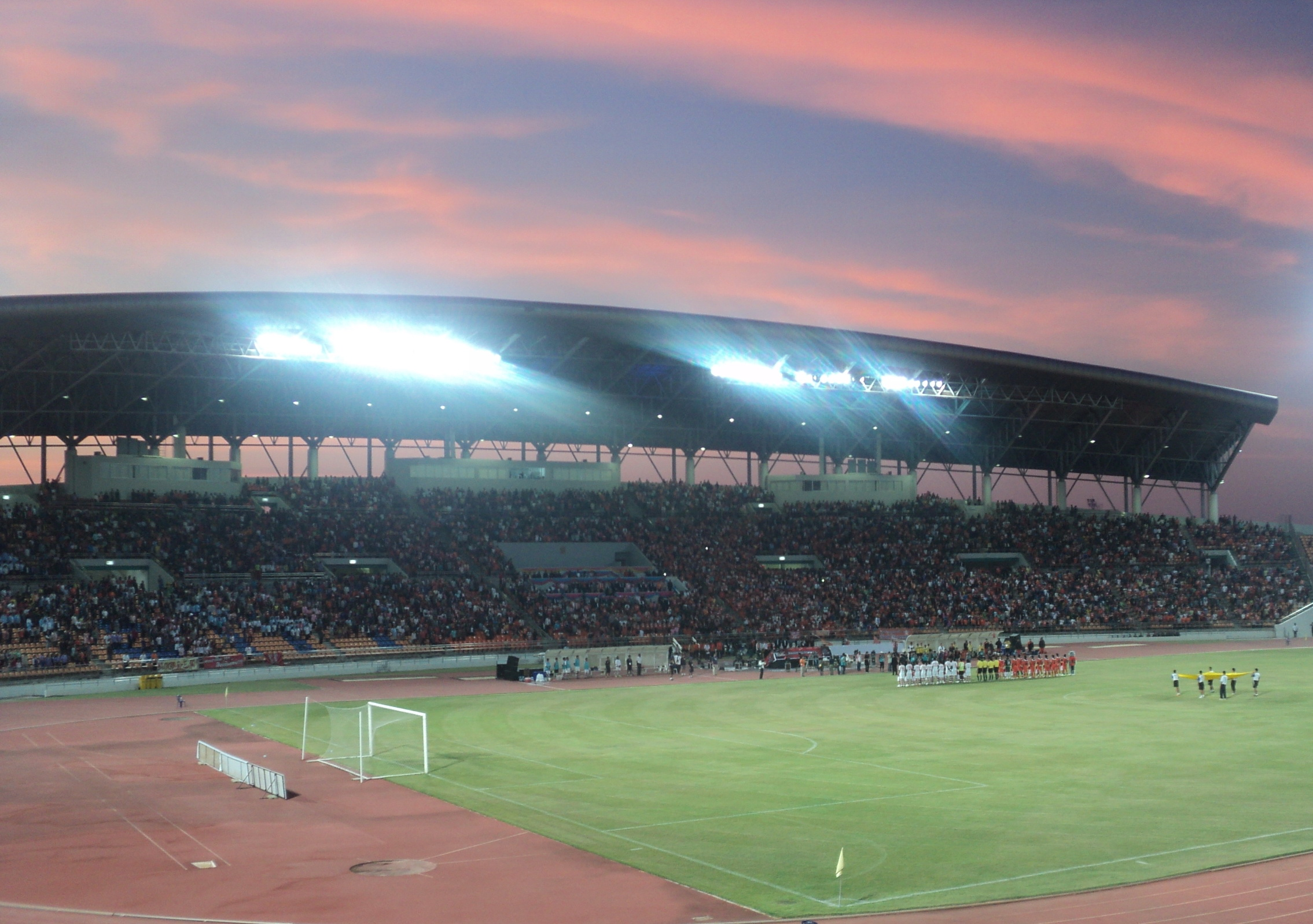
- Interactive map of Nakhon Ratchasima Sports Complex
- Full name: His Majesty the King's 80th Birthday Anniversary, 5 December 2007, Sports Complex
- Former names: 333rd Nakhon Ratchasima Anniversary Stadium
- Address: Nakhon Ratchasima; Thailand
- Main venue: 80th Birthday Stadium; Capacity: 25,000
- Facilities: Korat Chatchai Hall; Liptapanlop Hall

Construction
- Opened: 2 July 2007
- Cost: US$65 million (estimated)

Tenant
- Nakhon Ratchasima (2009–present)

His Majesty the King's 80th Birthday Anniversary, 5 December 2007, Sports Complex (Thai: ศูนย์กีฬาเฉลิมพระเกียรติ 80 พรรษา 5 ธันวา 2550), also known as the Nakhon Ratchasima Sports Complex, is a multi-use sports facility in Nakhon Ratchasima, Thailand, that was built for the 2007 Southeast Asian Games which coincided with the 80th birthday of King Bhumibol Adulyadej, hence the name of the venue.

== History ==
Completed on 2 July 2007 at a cost of US$65 million, the complex includes tennis courts, swimming pools, two indoor arenas (the Korat Chatchai Hall, used for volleyball and the smaller Liptapanlop Hall, used for gymnastics), a velodrome, a gym, a football training pitch complete with floodlights and a small stand, an office block, ticket sales booths, large parking areas, a large lake (not designed for sporting purposes) and the 80th Birthday Stadium, used for athletics and football. The athletes' village is not actually on the site, but is a kilometre further along Highway 304 by which the complex is situated.

The complex was purpose-built for the 24th Southeast Asian Games and was also used for the ASEAN Para Games which was held shortly after the SEA Games finished. Unlike many such developments, the complex has not become a "White Elephant" in the time since the SEA Games. Many schools tournaments have been held there as has an international tennis tournament, a "masters" (older athletes) athletics tournament, and a friendly-cum-warm-up match played between the Thai national team and Nakhon Ratchasima XI. The 80th Birthday Stadium is also the home ground of Nakhon Ratchasima. who moved there from the Nakhon Ratchasima Municipal Stadium in June 2008.

== International football matches ==
List of international football matches held at the Kuala Lumpur Stadium.

Date	Competition	Team 1	Res.	Team 2
18 November 2014	Friendly	Thailand	2–0	New Zealand
26 March 2015	Friendly	Thailand	2–0	Singapore
