= 2016 Pan Am Team Badminton Championships =

Tournament details
- Dates: 17–20 February
- Venue: CODE II Jalisco
- Location: Guadalajara, Mexico

Champions
- Men's teams: Mexico
- Women's teams: United States

The 2016 Pan Am Team Badminton Championships is a continental championships tournament of badminton teams in Pan America. The event was held in Guadalajara, Mexico from 17 to 20 February 2016.

== Tournament ==
The 2016 Pan Am Team Badminton Championships, officially Pan Am Team Continental Championships 2016, is a continental stage tournament of Thomas and Uber Cups, and also to crown the best men's and women's badminton team in Pan America. This event was organized by the Badminton Pan Am and Mexican Association of Badminton. 8 teams, consisting of 4 men's teams and 4 women's teams entered the tournament.

== Medalists ==
Event	Gold	Silver	Bronze
Men's Teams	Mexico	Canada	Guatemala
Women's Teams	United States	Canada	Mexico

=== Medal table ===
Rank	Nation	Gold	Silver	Bronze	Total
1	Mexico	1	0	1	2
2	United States	1	0	0	1
3	Canada	0	2	0	2
4	Guatemala	0	0	1	1
Totals (4 entries)		2	2	2	6

== Men's team ==
=== First round ===
Pos	Team	Pld	W	L	MF	MA	MD	GF	GA	GD	PF	PA	PD	Pts	Qualification
1	Mexico	3	3	0	10	5	+5	23	13	+10	686	623	+63	3	Final
2	Canada	3	2	1	8	7	+1	18	17	+1	624	608	+16	2	Final
3	Guatemala	3	1	2	8	7	+1	20	18	+2	682	651	+31	1	
4	United States	3	0	3	4	11	−7	11	24	−13	559	669	−110	0	

Source: TS
- Guatemala vs. Mexico

Guatemala
2
CODE II Jalisco, Court 1
17 February 2016, 16:00 UTC−6

Mexico
3

			1	2	3
1	(Guatemala) (Mexico)	Kevin Cordón; Lino Muñoz	21; 12	21; 17
2	(Guatemala) (Mexico)	Rodolfo Ramírez; Job Castillo	17; 21	17; 21
3	(Guatemala) (Mexico)	Rubén Castellanos; Luis Ramón Garrido	21; 17	17; 21	10; 21
4	(Guatemala) (Mexico)	Rodolfo Ramírez / Jonathan Solís; Job Castillo / Lino Muñoz	21; 15	17; 21	16; 21
5	(Guatemala) (Mexico)	Rubén Castellanos / Kevin Cordón; Luis Ramón Garrido / Andrés López	15; 21	21; 18	21; 13

- Canada vs. United States

Canada
4
CODE II Jalisco, Court 2
17 February 2016, 16:00 UTC−6

United States
1

			1	2	3
1	(Canada) (United States)	Martin Guiffre; Howard Shu	21; 17	19; 21	21; 16
2	(Canada) (United States)	Luke Couture; Timothy Lam	8; 21	6; 21
3	(Canada) (United States)	Jason Ho-shue; Vinson Chiu	21; 10	21; 11
4	(Canada) (United States)	Phil Gaumond / Max Marin; Kyle Emerick / Dung Truong	21; 17	21; 14
5	(Canada) (United States)	Phil Charron / Jason Ho-shue; Vinson Chiu / Howard Shu	24; 22	21; 9

- Canada vs. Guatemala

Canada
3
CODE II Jalisco, Court 1
18 February 2016, 16:00 UTC−6

Guatemala
2

			1	2	3
1	(Canada) (Guatemala)	Martin Guiffre; Kevin Cordón	21; 18	11; 21	8; 21
2	(Canada) (Guatemala)	Andrew Zhuang; Rodolfo Ramírez	6; 21	12; 21
3	(Canada) (Guatemala)	Jason Ho-shue; Rubén Castellanos	21; 7	21; 14
4	(Canada) (Guatemala)	Phil Gaumond / Max Marin; Rodolfo Ramírez / Jonathan Solís	21; 14	17; 21	21; 9
5	(Canada) (Guatemala)	Phil Charron / Jason Ho-shue; Rubén Castellanos / Kevin Cordón	18; 21	21; 19	21; 11

- Mexico vs. United States

Mexico
3
CODE II Jalisco, Court 2
18 February 2016, 16:00 UTC−6

United States
2

			1	2	3
1	(Mexico) (United States)	Lino Muñoz; Howard Shu	21; 12	22; 24	13; 21
2	(Mexico) (United States)	Job Castillo; Timothy Lam	21; 17	19; 21	14; 21
3	(Mexico) (United States)	Luis Ramón Garrido; Chan Yan Tuck	21; 4	21; 8
4	(Mexico) (United States)	Job Castillo / Lino Muñoz; Kyle Emerick / Dung Truong	21; 12	21; 11
5	(Mexico) (United States)	Luis Ramón Garrido / Andrés López; Vinson Chiu / Howard Shu	21; 18	21; 18

- Canada vs. Mexico

Canada
1
CODE II Jalisco, Court 1
19 February 2016, 16:00 UTC−6

Mexico
4

			1	2	3
1	(Canada) (Mexico)	Luke Couture; Arturo Hernández	17; 21	17; 21
2	(Canada) (Mexico)	Andrew Zhuang; Ailton Correa	14; 21	16; 21
3	(Canada) (Mexico)	Phil Gaumond; Francisco Treviño	20; 22	21; 16	17; 21
4	(Canada) (Mexico)	Phil Charron / Jason Ho-shue; Andrés López / Antonio Ocegueda	19; 21	18; 21
5	(Canada) (Mexico)	Phil Gaumond / Max Marin; Ailton Correa / Francisco Treviño	21; 12	21; 14

- Guatemala vs. United States

Guatemala
4
CODE II Jalisco, Court 2
19 February 2016, 16:00 UTC−6

United States
1

			1	2	3
1	(Guatemala) (United States)	Rodolfo Ramírez; Howard Shu	21; 18	21; 13
2	(Guatemala) (United States)	Rubén Castellanos; Timothy Lam	21; 8	10; 21	21; 11
3	(Guatemala) (United States)	Christopher Martínez; Vinson Chiu	18; 21	15; 21
4	(Guatemala) (United States)	Rodolfo Ramírez / Jonathan Solís; Kyle Emerick / Dung Truong	21; 18	21; 12
5	(Guatemala) (United States)	Rubén Castellanos / Christopher Martínez; Chan Yan Tuck / Vinson Chiu	18; 21	21; 18	21; 11

=== Final ===
- Mexico vs. Canada

Mexico
3
CODE II Jalisco, Court 1
20 February 2016, 13:00 UTC−6

Canada
0

			1	2	3
1	(Mexico) (Canada)	Lino Muñoz; Martin Guiffre	21; 17	21; 7
2	(Mexico) (Canada)	Job Castillo; Luke Couture	21; 11	21; 16
3	(Mexico) (Canada)	Ramón Garrido; Jason Ho-shue	21; 16	10; 21	21; 13
4	(Mexico) (Canada)	Job Castillo / Lino Muñoz; Phil Gaumond / Max Marin				not played
5	(Mexico) (Canada)	Luis Ramón Garrido / Andrés López; Phil Charron / Jason Ho-shue				not played

== Women's team ==
=== First round ===
Pos	Team	Pld	W	L	MF	MA	MD	GF	GA	GD	PF	PA	PD	Pts	Qualification
1	United States	3	3	0	12	3	+9	26	7	+19	662	449	+213	3	Final
2	Canada	3	2	1	11	4	+7	23	10	+13	645	520	+125	2	Final
3	Mexico	3	1	2	7	8	−1	14	18	−4	549	573	−24	1	
4	Guatemala	3	0	3	0	15	−15	2	30	−28	359	673	−314	0	

Source: TS
- Guatemala vs. Mexico

Guatemala
0
CODE II Jalisco, Court 1
17 February 2016, 10:00 UTC−6

Mexico
5

			1	2	3
1	(Guatemala) (Mexico)	Nikté Sotomayor; Haramara Gaitan	24; 22	16; 21	16; 21
2	(Guatemala) (Mexico)	Diana Corleto; Mariana Ugalde	14; 21	6; 21
3	(Guatemala) (Mexico)	Alejandra Paiz; Sabrina Solis	10; 21	14; 21
4	(Guatemala) (Mexico)	Mariana Paiz / Nikté Sotomayor; Anahi de la Torre / Adriana Valero	13; 21	23; 25
5	(Guatemala) (Mexico)	Diana Corleto / Alejandra Paiz; Haramara Gaitan / Cynthia González	16; 21	4; 21

- Canada vs. United States

Canada
2
CODE II Jalisco, Court 2
17 February 2016, 10:00 UTC−6

United States
3

			1	2	3
1	(Canada) (United States)	Kyleigh O'Donoghue; Iris Wang	13; 21	12; 21
2	(Canada) (United States)	Qingzi Ouyang; Crystal Pan	21; 15	21; 14
3	(Canada) (United States)	Phyllis Chan; Annie Xu	19; 21	15; 21
4	(Canada) (United States)	Phyllis Chan / Qingzi Ouyang; Crystal Pan / Iris Wang	22; 20	15; 21	18; 21
5	(Canada) (United States)	Michelle Tong / Josephine Wu; Annie Xu / Kerry Xu	21; 18	18; 21	23; 21

- Canada vs. Guatemala

Canada
5
CODE II Jalisco, Court 1
18 February 2016, 10:00 UTC−6

Guatemala
0

			1	2	3
1	(Canada) (Guatemala)	Kyleigh O'Donoghue; Nikté Sotomayor	17; 21	21; 3	21; 18
2	(Canada) (Guatemala)	Qingzi Ouyang; Diana Corleto	21; 11	21; 7
3	(Canada) (Guatemala)	Josephine Wu; Alejandra Paiz	21; 8	21; 7
4	(Canada) (Guatemala)	Phyllis Chan / Qingzi Ouyang; Mariana Paiz / Nikté Sotomayor	21; 13	21; 11
5	(Canada) (Guatemala)	Michelle Tong / Josephine Wu; Diana Corleto / Alejandra Paiz	21; 7	21; 8

- Mexico vs. United States

Mexico
1
CODE II Jalisco, Court 2
18 February 2016, 10:00 UTC−6

United States
4

			1	2	3
1	(Mexico) (United States)	Haramara Gaitan; Iris Wang	8; 21	7; 21
2	(Mexico) (United States)	Mariana Ugalde; Crystal Pan	12; 21	17; 21
3	(Mexico) (United States)	Sabrina Solis; Jennie Gai	21; 12	10; 21	21; 16
4	(Mexico) (United States)	Cynthia González / Mariana Ugalde; Crystal Pan / Iris Wang	9; 21	12; 21
5	(Mexico) (United States)	Haramara Gaitan / Sabrina Solis; Annie Xu / Kerry Xu	12; 21	13; 21

- Canada vs. Mexico

Canada
4
CODE II Jalisco, Court 1
19 February 2016, 10:00 UTC−6

Mexico
1

			1	2	3
1	(Canada) (Mexico)	Kyleigh O'Donoghue; Haramara Gaitan	18; 21	14; 21
2	(Canada) (Mexico)	Qingzi Ouyang; Mariana Ugalde	21; 15	21; 15
3	(Canada) (Mexico)	Josephine Wu; Cynthia González	21; 19	21; 17
4	(Canada) (Mexico)	Phyllis Chan / Qingzi Ouyang; Haramara Gaitan / Cynthia González	21; 11	21; 19
5	(Canada) (Mexico)	Michelle Tong / Josephine Wu; Anahi de la Torre / Adriana Valero	21; 16	21; 17

- Guatemala vs. United States

Guatemala
0
CODE II Jalisco, Court 2
19 February 2016, 10:00 UTC−6

United States
5

			1	2	3
1	(Guatemala) (United States)	Nikté Sotomayor; Crystal Pan	16; 21	18; 21
2	(Guatemala) (United States)	Diana Corleto; Kerry Xu	12; 21	5; 21
3	(Guatemala) (United States)	Mariana Paiz; Jennie Gai	8; 21	6; 21
4	(Guatemala) (United States)	Diana Corleto / Alejandra Paiz; Annie Xu / Kerry Xu	5; 21	7; 21
5	(Guatemala) (United States)	Mariana Paiz / Nikté Sotomayor; Crystal Pan / Iris Wang	7; 21	5; 21

=== Final ===
- United States vs. Canada

United States
3
CODE II Jalisco, Court
20 February 2016, 10:00 UTC−6

Canada
2

			1	2	3
1	(United States) (Canada)	Iris Wang; Kyleigh O'Donoghue	21; 13	21; 4
2	(United States) (Canada)	Crystal Pan; Qingzi Ouyang	12; 21	13; 21
3	(United States) (Canada)	Kerry Xu; Josephine Wu	21; 5	21; 5
4	(United States) (Canada)	Crystal Pan / Iris Wang; Phyllis Chan / Qingzi Ouyang	14; 21	21; 17	15; 21
5	(United States) (Canada)	Annie Xu / Kerry Xu; Michelle Tong / Josephine Wu	21; 19	23; 21
