= Dominican Republic national badminton team =

National badminton team representing the Dominican Republic

Dominican Republic
- Association: Federación Dominicana de Bádminton (FEDOBAD)
- Confederation: BPA (Pan America)
- President: Alberto Sanchez

BWF ranking
- Current ranking: 75 ▲6 (2 January 2024)
- Highest ranking: 46 (6 January 2015)

Pan Am Mixed Team Championships
- Appearances: 7 (first in 2008)
- Best result: 5th (2017)

Pan Am Men's Team Championships
- Appearances: 2 (first in 2010)
- Best result: Group stage

Pan Am Women's Team Championships
- Appearances: 1 (first in 2010)
- Best result: Group stage

The Dominican Republic national badminton team (Spanish: Equipo nacional de bádminton de la República Dominicana) represents Dominican Republic in international badminton team competitions. It is controlled by the Dominican Republic Badminton Federation. The Dominican Republic team finished 5th in the 2018 Pan Am Badminton Championships.

The Dominican Republic hosted the 2017 Pan Am Badminton Championships and achieved 5th place. The national team also competes in the Pan American Games. They won a bronze medal in men's doubles.

== Participation in Pan American Badminton Championships ==
Men's team

Year	Result
2010	Group stage
2018	5th place

Women's team

Year	Result
2010	Group stage

Mixed team

Year	Result
2008	8th place
2009	7th place
2012	7th place
2013	7th place
2014	7th place
2017	5th place
2019	8th place

== Junior competitive record ==
=== Suhandinata Cup ===
Year	Result
(Mexico) 2010	Group Z1 - 24th of 24
(Peru) 2015	Group B1 - 30th of 39
(Canada) 2018	Withdrew
(United States) 2023	Group D Withdrew

=== Pan American Junior Team Championships ===
==== Mixed team ====
Year	Round	Pos
2016	Fourth place	4th

== Players ==
=== Current squad ===
As of 2 January 2024

==== Men's team ====
Name	DoB/Age	Ranking of event		
Name	DoB/Age	MS	MD	XD
Yonatan Linarez	4 October 2000 (age 25)	284	153	154
Angel Marinez	6 February 1998 (age 28)	413	153	206
Anderson Taveras	21 September 2000 (age 25)	354	366	740
Ernick Zorrilla	18 January 2003 (age 23)	799	366	740

==== Women's team ====
Name	DoB/Age	Ranking of event		
Name	DoB/Age	WS	WD	XD
Nairoby Abigail Jiménez	22 October 2000 (age 25)	309	147	154
Alisa Juleisy Acosta	26 October 2001 (age 24)	289	147	206
Daniela Acosta	14 November 2003 (age 22)	528	328	740
Clarisa Pie	19 September 2001 (age 24)	528	328	740
