= 2006 Pan American Thomas & Uber Cup Preliminaries =

Tournament details
- Dates: 15–18 February
- Venue: Club de Regatas Lima
- Location: Lima, Peru

The 2006 Pan American Thomas & Uber Cup Preliminaries was a continental badminton tournament held to determine the teams qualified for the 2006 Thomas & Uber Cup in Pan America. The event was held in Lima, Peru from 15 to 18 February 2006.

== Tournament ==
The 2006 Pan American Thomas & Uber Cup Preliminaries, is a continental team tournament staged to determine the teams in Pan America that are qualified for the 2006 Thomas & Uber Cup. This event was organized by Badminton Pan Am and the Peru Badminton Federation. 16 teams, consisting of 9 men's teams and 7 women's teams entered the tournament.

== Men's team ==
=== Group stage ===
==== Group A ====
| Pos | Team | Pld | W | L | MF | MA | MD | GF | GA | GD | PF | PA | PD | Pts | Qualification |
|---|---|---|---|---|---|---|---|---|---|---|---|---|---|---|---|
| 1 | Canada | 4 | 4 | 0 | 20 | 0 | +20 | 40 | 0 | +40 | 840 | 444 | +396 | 4 | Knockout stage |
| 2 | Peru | 4 | 3 | 1 | 13 | 7 | +6 | 26 | 17 | +9 | 767 | 736 | +31 | 3 | Knockout stage |
| 3 | Brazil | 4 | 2 | 2 | 11 | 9 | +2 | 22 | 21 | +1 | 744 | 741 | +3 | 2 | |
| 4 | Jamaica | 4 | 1 | 3 | 6 | 14 | −8 | 15 | 28 | −13 | 710 | 812 | −102 | 1 | |
| 5 | Trinidad and Tobago | 4 | 0 | 4 | 0 | 20 | −20 | 3 | 40 | −37 | 560 | 888 | −328 | 0 | |

Source: BWF
- Canada vs Jamaica

Canada
5
Club Regatas de Lima, Court 3
15 February 2006, 09:00 UTC−5

Jamaica
0

| | | | 1 | 2 | 3 |
|---|---|---|---|---|---|
| 1 | (Canada) (Jamaica) | Andrew Dabeka; Bradley Graham | 21; 11 | 21; 12 |
| 2 | (Canada) (Jamaica) | Kyle Foley; Garron Palmer | 21; 12 | 21; 16 |
| 3 | (Canada) (Jamaica) | Stephan Wojcikiewicz; Emelio Mendez | 21; 10 | 21; 15 |
| 4 | (Canada) (Jamaica) | Mike Beres / William Milroy; Bradley Graham / Garron Palmer | 21; 11 | 21; 13 |
| 5 | (Canada) (Jamaica) | Andrew Dabeka / Bobby Milroy; John Martin / Emelio Mendez | 21; 8 | 21; 17 |

- Trinidad and Tobago vs Brazil

Trinidad and Tobago
0
Club Regatas de Lima, Court 5
15 February 2006, 09:00 UTC−5

Brazil
5

| | | | 1 | 2 | 3 |
|---|---|---|---|---|---|
| 1 | (Trinidad and Tobago) (Brazil) | Kerwyn Pantin; Guilherme Pardo | 14; 21 | 8; 21 |
| 2 | (Trinidad and Tobago) (Brazil) | Anil Seepaul; Thomas Araújo | 17; 21 | 16; 21 |
| 3 | (Trinidad and Tobago) (Brazil) | Darron Charles; Lucas Araújo | 21; 14 | 9; 21 | 18; 21 |
| 4 | (Trinidad and Tobago) (Brazil) | Kerwyn Pantin / Anil Seepaul; Guilherme Kumasaka / Guilherme Pardo | 13; 21 | 13; 21 |
| 5 | (Trinidad and Tobago) (Brazil) | Darron Charles / Rahul Rampersad; Lucas Araújo / Fabio Torquato | 21; 18 | 14; 21 | 12; 21 |

- Brazil vs Jamaica

Brazil
4
Club Regatas de Lima, Court 3
15 February 2006, 14:00 UTC−5

Jamaica
1

| | | | 1 | 2 | 3 |
|---|---|---|---|---|---|
| 1 | (Brazil) (Jamaica) | Guilherme Pardo; Bradley Graham | 4; 21 | 21; 13 | 21; 15 |
| 2 | (Brazil) (Jamaica) | Fabio Torquato; Garron Palmer | 14; 21 | 19; 21 |
| 3 | (Brazil) (Jamaica) | Lucas Araújo; Emelio Mendez | 21; 17 | 21; 13 |
| 4 | (Brazil) (Jamaica) | Guilherme Kumasaka / Guilherme Pardo; Bradley Graham / Garron Palmer | 21; 16 | 21; 10 |
| 5 | (Brazil) (Jamaica) | Lucas Araújo / Thomas Araújo; John Martin / Emelio Mendez | 21; 8 | 21; 17 |

- Peru vs Trinidad and Tobago

Peru
5
Club Regatas de Lima, Court 2
15 February 2006, 19:00 UTC−5

Trinidad and Tobago
0

| | | | 1 | 2 | 3 |
|---|---|---|---|---|---|
| 1 | (Peru) (Trinidad and Tobago) | Rodrigo Pacheco; Kerwyn Pantin | 21; 11 | 21; 7 |
| 2 | (Peru) (Trinidad and Tobago) | Andrés Corpancho; Anil Seepaul | 21; 6 | 21; 16 |
| 3 | (Peru) (Trinidad and Tobago) | Juan José Espinosa; Darron Charles | 13; 21 | 21; 7 | 21; 17 |
| 4 | (Peru) (Trinidad and Tobago) | Antonio de Vinatea / Martin del Valle; Rahul Rampersad / Justin Siu | 21; 16 | 21; 14 |
| 5 | (Peru) (Trinidad and Tobago) | Juan José Espinosa / Francisco Ugaz; Kerwyn Pantin / Anil Seepaul | 21; 10 | 21; 14 |

- Peru vs Brazil

Peru
3
Club Regatas de Lima, Court 2
16 February 2006, 09:00 UTC−5

Brazil
2

| | | | 1 | 2 | 3 |
|---|---|---|---|---|---|
| 1 | (Peru) (Brazil) | Rodrigo Pacheco; Guilherme Pardo | 21; 18 | 21; 16 |
| 2 | (Peru) (Brazil) | Juan José Espinosa; Lucas Araújo | 14; 21 | 13; 21 |
| 3 | (Peru) (Brazil) | Andrés Corpancho; Thomas Araújo | 21; 18 | 21; 14 |
| 4 | (Peru) (Brazil) | Juan José Espinosa / Francisco Ugaz; Guilherme Kumasaka / Fabio Torquato | 21; 16 | 23; 21 |
| 5 | (Peru) (Brazil) | Antonio de Vinatea / Martin del Valle; Lucas Araújo / Guilherme Pardo | 14; 21 | 14; 21 |

- Canada vs Trinidad and Tobago

Canada
5
Club Regatas de Lima, Court 3
16 February 2006, 09:00 UTC−5

Trinidad and Tobago
0

| | | | 1 | 2 | 3 |
|---|---|---|---|---|---|
| 1 | (Canada) (Trinidad and Tobago) | Andrew Dabeka; Kerwyn Pantin | 21; 8 | 21; 13 |
| 2 | (Canada) (Trinidad and Tobago) | Kyle Foley; Anil Seepaul | 21; 10 | 21; 4 |
| 3 | (Canada) (Trinidad and Tobago) | Stephan Wojcikiewicz; Darron Charles | 21; 11 | 21; 10 |
| 4 | (Canada) (Trinidad and Tobago) | Andrew Dabeka / Bobby Milroy; Rahul Rampersad / Justin Siu | 21; 8 | 21; 6 |
| 5 | (Canada) (Trinidad and Tobago) | William Milroy / Stephan Wojcikiewicz; Kerwyn Pantin / Anil Seepaul | 21; 8 | 21; 9 |

- Peru vs Jamaica

Peru
4
Club Regatas de Lima, Court 2
16 February 2006, 14:00 UTC−5

Jamaica
1

| | | | 1 | 2 | 3 |
|---|---|---|---|---|---|
| 1 | (Peru) (Jamaica) | Rodrigo Pacheco; Bradley Graham | 21; 18 | 16; 21 | 23; 21 |
| 2 | (Peru) (Jamaica) | Andrés Corpancho; Garron Palmer | 21; 19 | 21; 7 |
| 3 | (Peru) (Jamaica) | Antonio de Vinatea; Emelio Mendez | 21; 11 | 21; 14 |
| 4 | (Peru) (Jamaica) | Juan José Espinosa / Francisco Ugaz; Bradley Graham / Garron Palmer | 22; 20 | 10; 21 | 21; 19 |
| 5 | (Peru) (Jamaica) | Rodrigo Pacheco / Andrés Corpancho; John Martin / Emelio Mendez | 21; 17 | 21; 12 |

- Canada vs Brazil

Canada
5
Club Regatas de Lima, Court 4
16 February 2006, 14:00 UTC−5

Brazil
0

| | | | 1 | 2 | 3 |
|---|---|---|---|---|---|
| 1 | (Canada) (Brazil) | Kyle Foley; Thomas Araújo | 21; 15 | 21; 18 |
| 2 | (Canada) (Brazil) | Mike Beres; Fabio Torquato | 21; 12 | 21; 7 |
| 3 | (Canada) (Brazil) | William Milroy; Renato Brazil | 21; 6 | 21; 4 |
| 4 | (Canada) (Brazil) | Andrew Dabeka / Bobby Milroy; Lucas Araújo / Guilherme Pardo | 21; 17 | 21; 8 |
| 5 | (Canada) (Brazil) | Mike Beres / Kyle Foley; Thomas Araújo / Fabio Torquato | 21; 16 | 21; 7 |

- Canada vs Peru

Canada
5
Club Regatas de Lima, Court 2
16 February 2006, 19:00 UTC−5

Peru
0

| | | | 1 | 2 | 3 |
|---|---|---|---|---|---|
| 1 | (Canada) (Peru) | Bobby Milroy; Andrés Corpancho | 21; 13 | 21; 18 |
| 2 | (Canada) (Peru) | Andrew Dabeka; Juan José Espinosa | 21; 10 | 21; 17 |
| 3 | (Canada) (Peru) | Stefan Wojcikiewicz; Antonio de Vinatea | 21; 10 | 21; 14 |
| 4 | (Canada) (Peru) | Mike Beres / William Milroy; Juan José Espinosa / Francisco Ugaz | 21; 4 | 21; 14 |
| 5 | (Canada) (Peru) | Andrew Dabeka / Bobby Milroy; Andrés Corpancho / Martin del Valle | 21; 7 | 21; 15 |

- Trinidad and Tobago vs Jamaica

Trinidad and Tobago
0
Club Regatas de Lima, Court 5
16 February 2006, 19:00 UTC−5

Jamaica
5

| | | | 1 | 2 | 3 |
|---|---|---|---|---|---|
| 1 | (Trinidad and Tobago) (Jamaica) | Kerwyn Pantin; Bradley Graham | 14; 21 | 18; 21 |
| 2 | (Trinidad and Tobago) (Jamaica) | Anil Seepaul; Garron Palmer | 19; 21 | 15; 21 |
| 3 | (Trinidad and Tobago) (Jamaica) | Darron Charles; Emelio Mendez | 15; 21 | 22; 24 |
| 4 | (Trinidad and Tobago) (Jamaica) | Darron Charles / Kerwyn Pantin; Bradley Graham / Garron Palmer | 15; 21 | 9; 21 |
| 5 | (Trinidad and Tobago) (Jamaica) | Rahul Rampersad / Anil Seepaul; John Martin / Emelio Mendez | 16; 21 | 15; 21 |

==== Group B ====
| Pos | Team | Pld | W | L | MF | MA | MD | GF | GA | GD | PF | PA | PD | Pts | Qualification |
|---|---|---|---|---|---|---|---|---|---|---|---|---|---|---|---|
| 1 | United States | 3 | 3 | 0 | 14 | 1 | +13 | 28 | 2 | +26 | 622 | 318 | +304 | 3 | Knockout stage |
| 2 | Guatemala | 3 | 2 | 1 | 9 | 6 | +3 | 18 | 14 | +4 | 556 | 538 | +18 | 2 | Knockout stage |
| 3 | Mexico | 3 | 1 | 2 | 6 | 9 | −3 | 14 | 18 | −4 | 537 | 567 | −30 | 1 | |
| 4 | Puerto Rico | 3 | 0 | 3 | 1 | 14 | −13 | 2 | 28 | −26 | 329 | 621 | −292 | 0 | |

Source: BWF
- United States vs Puerto Rico

United States
5
Club Regatas de Lima, Court 2
15 February 2006, 09:00 UTC−5

Puerto Rico
0

| | | | 1 | 2 | 3 |
|---|---|---|---|---|---|
| 1 | (United States) (Puerto Rico) | Raju Rai; Victor Perez | 21; 5 | 21; 12 |
| 2 | (United States) (Puerto Rico) | Eric Go; Julio Diaz | 21; 11 | 21; 3 |
| 3 | (United States) (Puerto Rico) | Ronald Sou; Mario Oyola | 21; 11 | 21; 8 |
| 4 | (United States) (Puerto Rico) | Eric Go / Raju Rai; Julio Diaz / Esteban Rivera | 21; 5 | 21; 8 |
| 5 | (United States) (Puerto Rico) | Howard Bach / Tony Gunawan; Mario Oyola / Victor Perez | 21; 4 | 21; 3 |

- Guatemala vs Mexico

Guatemala
4
Club Regatas de Lima, Court 2
15 February 2006, 14:00 UTC−5

Mexico
1

| | | | 1 | 2 | 3 |
|---|---|---|---|---|---|
| 1 | (Guatemala) (Mexico) | Pedro Yang; José González | 21; 11 | 17; 21 | 21; 17 |
| 2 | (Guatemala) (Mexico) | Erick Anguiano; Jesús Aguilar | 12; 21 | 12; 21 |
| 3 | (Guatemala) (Mexico) | Kevin Cordón; Salvador Sánchez | 21; 18 | 21; 16 |
| 4 | (Guatemala) (Mexico) | Erick Anguiano / Pedro Yang; Jesús Aguilar / Daniel Orozco | 21; 18 | 17; 21 | 21; 11 |
| 5 | (Guatemala) (Mexico) | Kevin Cordón / Rodolfo Ramírez; José González / Salvador Sánchez | 21; 17 | 21; 16 |

- Guatemala vs Puerto Rico

Guatemala
5
Club Regatas de Lima, Court 4
15 February 2006, 19:00 UTC−5

Puerto Rico
0

| | | | 1 | 2 | 3 |
|---|---|---|---|---|---|
| 1 | (Guatemala) (Puerto Rico) | Pedro Yang; Victor Perez | 21; 7 | 21; 16 |
| 2 | (Guatemala) (Puerto Rico) | Kevin Cordón; Julio Diaz | 21; 6 | 21; 10 |
| 3 | (Guatemala) (Puerto Rico) | Rodolfo Ramírez; Esteban Rivera | 21; 7 | 21; 12 |
| 4 | (Guatemala) (Puerto Rico) | Erick Anguiano / Pedro Yang; Mario Oyola / Victor Perez | 21; 8 | 22; 20 |
| 5 | (Guatemala) (Puerto Rico) | Kevin Cordón / Rodolfo Ramírez; Julio Diaz / Esteban Rivera | 21; 11 | 21; 19 |

- United States vs Mexico

United States
4
Club Regatas de Lima, Court 5
15 February 2006, 19:00 UTC−5

Mexico
1

| | | | 1 | 2 | 3 |
|---|---|---|---|---|---|
| 1 | (United States) (Mexico) | Raju Rai; José González | 21; 11 | 21; 13 |
| 2 | (United States) (Mexico) | Eric Go; Daniel Orozco | 21; 10 | 21; 13 |
| 3 | (United States) (Mexico) | Ronald Sou; Jesús Aguilar | 15; 21 | 15; 21 |
| 4 | (United States) (Mexico) | Eric Go / Raju Rai; José González / Salvador Sánchez | 21; 7 | 21; 12 |
| 5 | (United States) (Mexico) | Howard Bach / Tony Gunawan; Jesús Aguilar / Daniel Orozco | 21; 7 | 21; 14 |

- Puerto Rico vs Mexico

Puerto Rico
1
Club Regatas de Lima, Court 1
16 February 2006, 09:30 UTC−5

Mexico
4

| | | | 1 | 2 | 3 |
|---|---|---|---|---|---|
| 1 | (Puerto Rico) (Mexico) | Victor Perez; José González | 12; 21 | 10; 21 |
| 2 | (Puerto Rico) (Mexico) | Julio Diaz; Daniel Orozco | 19; 21 | 10; 21 |
| 3 | (Puerto Rico) (Mexico) | Mario Oyola; Jesús Aguilar | 10; 21 | 5; 21 |
| 4 | (Puerto Rico) (Mexico) | Julio Diaz / Esteban Rivera; José González / Salvador Sánchez | 21; 19 | 21; 13 |
| 5 | (Puerto Rico) (Mexico) | Victor Perez; Jesús Aguilar | 18; 21 | 17; 21 |

- United States vs Guatemala

United States
5
Club Regatas de Lima, Court 3
16 February 2006, 19:00 UTC−5

Guatemala
0

| | | | 1 | 2 | 3 |
|---|---|---|---|---|---|---|
| 1 | (United States) (Guatemala) | Raju Rai; Pedro Yang | 21; 14 | 21; 15 |
| 2 | (United States) (Guatemala) | Eric Go; Erick Anguiano | 21; 10 | 21; 16 |
| 3 | (United States) (Guatemala) | Tony Gunawan; Kevin Cordón | 25; 23 | 21; 11 |
| 4 | (United States) (Guatemala) | Tony Gunawan / Raju Rai; Erick Anguiano / Rodolfo Ramírez | | | | w/o |
| 5 | (United States) (Guatemala) | Howard Bach / Eric Go; Kevin Cordón / Pedro Yang | 21; 16 | 21; 14 |

=== Knockout stage ===
==== Bracket ====
Semi-finals
17 February
Canada | 3
Guatemala | 1
17 February
Peru | 0
United States | 3

Final
18 February
Canada | 2
United States | 3
Third place
18 February
Guatemala | 3
Peru | 2

==== Semi-finals ====
- Canada vs Guatemala

Canada
3
Club Regatas de Lima, Court 2
17 February 2006, 19:00 UTC−5

Guatemala
1

| | | | 1 | 2 | 3 |
|---|---|---|---|---|---|---|
| 1 | (Canada) (Guatemala) | Bobby Milroy; Pedro Yang | 21; 9 | 21; 19 |
| 2 | (Canada) (Guatemala) | Kyle Foley; Erick Anguiano | 21; 7 | 21; 15 |
| 3 | (Canada) (Guatemala) | Stephan Wojcikiewicz; Kevin Cordón | 19; 21 | 22; 20 | 14; 21 |
| 4 | (Canada) (Guatemala) | Mike Beres / William Milroy; Erick Anguiano / Pedro Yang | 21; 6 | 21; 15 |
| 5 | (Canada) (Guatemala) | Kyle Foley / Bobby Milroy; Kevin Cordón / Rodolfo Ramírez | | | | not played |

- Peru vs United States

Peru
0
Club Regatas de Lima, Court 1
17 February 2006, 19:00 UTC−5

United States
3

| | | | 1 | 2 | 3 |
|---|---|---|---|---|---|---|
| 1 | (Peru) (United States) | Rodrigo Pacheco; Raju Rai | 20; 22 | 7; 21 |
| 2 | (Peru) (United States) | Andrés Corpancho; Eric Go | 15; 21 | 21; 19 | 22; 24 |
| 3 | (Peru) (United States) | Juan José Espinosa; Howard Bach | 21; 17 | 14; 21 | 8; 21 |
| 4 | (Peru) (United States) | Juan José Espinosa / Francisco Ugaz; Tony Gunawan / Raju Rai | | | | not played |
| 5 | (Peru) (United States) | Andrés Corpancho / Rodrigo Pacheco; Howard Bach / Eric Go | | | | not played |

==== Third place ====
- Guatemala vs Peru

Guatemala
3
Club Regatas de Lima, Court 1
18 February 2006, 09:00 UTC−5

Peru
2

| | | | 1 | 2 | 3 |
|---|---|---|---|---|---|
| 1 | (Guatemala) (Peru) | Pedro Yang; Rodrigo Pacheco | 21; 16 | 8; 21 | 21; 18 |
| 2 | (Guatemala) (Peru) | Erick Anguiano; Andrés Corpancho | 9; 21 | 21; 14 | 17; 21 |
| 3 | (Guatemala) (Peru) | Kevin Cordón; Antonio de Vinatea | 19; 21 | 21; 14 | 21; 11 |
| 4 | (Guatemala) (Peru) | Erick Anguiano / Rodolfo Ramírez; Francisco Ugaz / Juan Jose Espinosa | 12; 21 | 13; 21 |
| 5 | (Guatemala) (Peru) | Kevin Cordón / Pedro Yang; Andrés Corpancho / Rodrigo Pacheco | 21; 10 | 21; 13 |

=== Final ===
- Canada vs United States

Canada
2
Club Regatas de Lima, Court 1
18 February 2006, 14:00 UTC−5

United States
3

| | | | 1 | 2 | 3 |
|---|---|---|---|---|---|
| 1 | (Canada) (United States) | Bobby Milroy; Raju Rai | 21; 16 | 20; 22 | 18; 21 |
| 2 | (Canada) (United States) | Andrew Dabeka; Eric Go | 21; 14 | 21; 12 |
| 3 | (Canada) (United States) | Stephan Wojcikiewicz; Howard Bach | 21; 13 | 21; 4 |
| 4 | (Canada) (United States) | Mike Beres / William Milroy; Tony Gunawan / Raju Rai | 18; 21 | 19; 21 |
| 5 | (Canada) (United States) | Andrew Dabeka / Bobby Milroy; Howard Bach / Eric Go | 15; 21 | 20; 22 |

== Women's team ==
=== Group stage ===
==== Group A ====
| Pos | Team | Pld | W | L | MF | MA | MD | GF | GA | GD | PF | PA | PD | Pts | Qualification |
|---|---|---|---|---|---|---|---|---|---|---|---|---|---|---|---|
| 1 | Canada | 2 | 2 | 0 | 10 | 0 | +10 | 20 | 0 | +20 | 422 | 237 | +185 | 2 | Knockout stage |
| 2 | Peru | 2 | 1 | 1 | 5 | 5 | 0 | 10 | 11 | −1 | 371 | 340 | +31 | 1 | Knockout stage |
| 3 | Mexico | 2 | 0 | 2 | 0 | 10 | −10 | 1 | 20 | −19 | 223 | 439 | −216 | 0 | |

Source: BWF
- Canada vs. Mexico

Canada
5
Club Regatas de Lima, Court 4
15 February 2006, 09:00 UTC−5

Mexico
0

| | | | 1 | 2 | 3 |
|---|---|---|---|---|---|
| 1 | (Canada) (Mexico) | Charmaine Reid; Marisol Domínguez | 21; 12 | 21; 7 |
| 2 | (Canada) (Mexico) | Valerie Loker; Naty Rangel | 21; 9 | 23; 21 |
| 3 | (Canada) (Mexico) | Sarah MacMaster; Rossina Núñez | 21; 8 | 21; 9 |
| 4 | (Canada) (Mexico) | Helen Nichol / Charmaine Reid; Marisol Domínguez / Naty Rangel | 21; 5 | 21; 6 |
| 5 | (Canada) (Mexico) | Amélie Felx / Florence Lavoie; Victoria Montero / Rossina Núñez | 21; 7 | 21; 9 |

- Peru vs Mexico

Peru
5
Club Regatas de Lima, Court 3
15 February 2006, 19:00 UTC−5

Mexico
0

| | | | 1 | 2 | 3 |
|---|---|---|---|---|---|
| 1 | (Peru) (Mexico) | Claudia Rivero; Naty Rangel | 21; 13 | 21; 5 |
| 2 | (Peru) (Mexico) | Jie Meng; Rossina Núñez | 21; 12 | 16; 21 | 22; 20 |
| 3 | (Peru) (Mexico) | Alejandra Monteverde; Victoria Montero | 21; 8 | 21; 12 |
| 4 | (Peru) (Mexico) | Doriana Rivera / Valeria Rivero; Marisol Domínguez / Naty Rangel | 21; 10 | 21; 13 |
| 5 | (Peru) (Mexico) | Cynthia Calderón / Jie Meng; Victoria Montero / Rossina Núñez | 21; 6 | 21; 10 |

- Canada vs Peru

Canada
5
Club Regatas de Lima, Court 3
16 February 2006, 14:00 UTC−5

Peru
0

| | | | 1 | 2 | 3 |
|---|---|---|---|---|---|
| 1 | (Canada) (Peru) | Charmaine Reid; Claudia Rivero | 21; 18 | 21; 18 |
| 2 | (Canada) (Peru) | Florence Lavoie; Jie Meng | 21; 12 | 21; 8 |
| 3 | (Canada) (Peru) | Sarah MacMaster; Alejandra Monteverde | 21; 15 | 21; 11 |
| 4 | (Canada) (Peru) | Helen Nichol / Charmaine Reid; Doriana Rivera / Valeria Rivero | 21; 15 | 21; 16 |
| 5 | (Canada) (Peru) | Valerie Loker / Sarah MacMaster; Cynthia Calderón / Jie Meng | 21; 14 | 21; 17 |

==== Group B ====
| Pos | Team | Pld | W | L | MF | MA | MD | GF | GA | GD | PF | PA | PD | Pts | Qualification |
|---|---|---|---|---|---|---|---|---|---|---|---|---|---|---|---|
| 1 | United States | 3 | 3 | 0 | 15 | 0 | +15 | 30 | 0 | +30 | 630 | 282 | +348 | 3 | Knockout stage |
| 2 | Cuba | 3 | 2 | 1 | 10 | 5 | +5 | 20 | 12 | +8 | 577 | 452 | +125 | 2 | Knockout stage |
| 3 | Brazil | 3 | 1 | 2 | 4 | 11 | −7 | 10 | 24 | −14 | 446 | 663 | −217 | 1 | |
| 4 | Trinidad and Tobago | 3 | 0 | 3 | 1 | 14 | −13 | 4 | 28 | −24 | 401 | 657 | −256 | 0 | |

Source: BWF
- United States vs Trinidad and Tobago

United States
5
Club Regatas de Lima, Court 4
15 February 2006, 14:00 UTC−5

Trinidad and Tobago
0

| | | | 1 | 2 | 3 |
|---|---|---|---|---|---|
| 1 | (United States) (Trinidad and Tobago) | Lili Zhou; Kesma Benito | 21; 4 | 21; 6 |
| 2 | (United States) (Trinidad and Tobago) | Jamie Subandhi; Kerian Quan Chee | 21; 7 | 21; 6 |
| 3 | (United States) (Trinidad and Tobago) | Jennifer Coleman / Melinda Keszthelyi; Sabrina Cassie / Zeudi Mack | 21; 18 | 21; 6 |
| 4 | (United States) (Trinidad and Tobago) | Rulien Yeh; Nekeisha Blake | 21; 14 | 21; 9 |
| 5 | (United States) (Trinidad and Tobago) | Eva Lee / Mesinee Mangkalakiri; Kesma Benito / Kerian Quan Chee | 21; 10 | 21; 7 |

- Cuba vs Brazil

Cuba
3
Club Regatas de Lima, Court 5
15 February 2006, 14:00 UTC−5

Brazil
2

| | | | 1 | 2 | 3 |
|---|---|---|---|---|---|
| 1 | (Cuba) (Brazil) | Solángel Guzmán; Patricia Oelke | 21; 9 | 21; 4 |
| 2 | (Cuba) (Brazil) | Lisandra Suárez; Mariana Arimori | 21; 13 | 21; 14 |
| 3 | (Cuba) (Brazil) | Leydi Edith Mora; Renata Faustino | 21; 13 | 21; 8 |
| 4 | (Cuba) (Brazil) | Solángel Guzmán / Lisandra Suárez; Jaqueline Kaestner / Patricia Oelke | 21; 10 | 13; 21 | 21; 9 |
| 5 | (Cuba) (Brazil) | Isaura Medina / Leydi Edith Mora; Paula Pereira / Thayse Salles | 21; 11 | 18; 21 | 21; 7 |

- Cuba vs Trinidad and Tobago

Cuba
5
Club Regatas de Lima, Court 4
16 February 2006, 09:00 UTC−5

Trinidad and Tobago
0

| | | | 1 | 2 | 3 |
|---|---|---|---|---|---|
| 1 | (Cuba) (Trinidad and Tobago) | Solángel Guzmán; Nekeisha Blake | 21; 4 | 21; 11 |
| 2 | (Cuba) (Trinidad and Tobago) | Lisandra Suárez; Kerian Quan Chee | 21; 7 | 21; 6 |
| 3 | (Cuba) (Trinidad and Tobago) | Leydi Edith Mora; Kesma Benito | 21; 16 | 21; 9 |
| 4 | (Cuba) (Trinidad and Tobago) | Solángel Guzmán / Isaura Medina; Sabrina Cassie / Zeudi Mack | 21; 13 | 21; 15 |
| 5 | (Cuba) (Trinidad and Tobago) | Leydi Edith Mora / Lisandra Suárez; Kesma Benito / Kerian Quan Chee | 21; 9 | 21; 12 |

- United States vs Brazil

United States
5
Club Regatas de Lima, Court 5
16 February 2006, 09:00 UTC−5

Brazil
0

| | | | 1 | 2 | 3 |
|---|---|---|---|---|---|
| 1 | (United States) (Brazil) | Eva Lee; Patricia Oelke | 21; 3 | 21; 6 |
| 2 | (United States) (Brazil) | Lili Zhou; Mariana Arimori | 21; 7 | 21; 7 |
| 3 | (United States) (Brazil) | Rulan Yeh; Renata Faustino | 21; 9 | 21; 9 |
| 4 | (United States) (Brazil) | Jennifer Coleman / Melinda Keszthelyi; Jaqueline Kaestner / Patricia Oelke | 21; 2 | 21; 6 |
| 5 | (United States) (Brazil) | Rulan Yeh / Rulien Yeh; Paula Pereira / Thayse Salles | 21; 9 | 21; 11 |

- Brazil vs Trinidad and Tobago

Brazil
4
Club Regatas de Lima, Court 5
16 February 2006, 14:00 UTC−5

Trinidad and Tobago
1

| | | | 1 | 2 | 3 |
|---|---|---|---|---|---|
| 1 | (Brazil) (Trinidad and Tobago) | Patricia Oelke; Kerian Quan Chee | 21; 19 | 18; 21 | 21; 7 |
| 2 | (Brazil) (Trinidad and Tobago) | Mariana Arimori; Nekeisha Blake | 21; 19 | 21; 16 |
| 3 | (Brazil) (Trinidad and Tobago) | Renata Faustino; Kesma Benito | 21; 19 | 21; 17 |
| 4 | (Brazil) (Trinidad and Tobago) | Patricia Oelke / Jaqueline Kaestner; Sabrina Cassie / Zeudi Mack | 19; 21 | 13; 21 |
| 5 | (Brazil) (Trinidad and Tobago) | Paula Pereira / Thayse Salles; Kesma Benito / Kerian Quan Chee | 21; 15 | 19; 21 | 21; 16 |

- United States vs Cuba

United States
5
Club Regatas de Lima, Court 4
16 February 2006, 19:00 UTC−5

Cuba
0

| | | | 1 | 2 | 3 |
|---|---|---|---|---|---|
| 1 | (United States) (Cuba) | Eva Lee; Solángel Guzmán | 21; 15 | 21; 10 |
| 2 | (United States) (Cuba) | Jamie Subandhi; Isaura Medina | 21; 10 | 21; 10 |
| 3 | (United States) (Cuba) | Cindy Shi; Lisandra Suárez | 21; 14 | 21; 9 |
| 4 | (United States) (Cuba) | Melinda Keszthelyi / Mesinee Mangkalakiri; Solángel Guzmán / Isaura Medina | 21; 11 | 21; 16 |
| 5 | (United States) (Cuba) | Eva Lee / Lili Zhou; Leydi Edith Mora / Lisandra Suárez | 21; 15 | 21; 16 |

=== Knockout stage ===
==== Bracket ====
Semi-finals
17 February
Canada | 3
Cuba | 1
17 February
Peru | 0
United States | 3

Final
18 February
Canada | 0
United States | 3
Third place
18 February
Cuba | 3
Peru | 1

==== Semi-finals ====
- Peru vs United States

Peru
0
Club Regatas de Lima, Court 1
17 February 2006, 14:00 UTC−5

United States
3

| | | | 1 | 2 | 3 |
|---|---|---|---|---|---|---|
| 1 | (Peru) (United States) | Claudia Rivero; Lili Zhou | 14; 21 | 19; 21 |
| 2 | (Peru) (United States) | Cynthia Calderón; Jamie Subandhi | 8; 21 | 9; 21 |
| 3 | (Peru) (United States) | Alejandra Monteverde; Cindy Shi | 18; 21 | 19; 21 |
| 4 | (Peru) (United States) | Doriana Rivera / Valeria Rivero; Eva Lee / Mesinee Mangkalakiri | | | | not played |
| 5 | (Peru) (United States) | Cynthia Calderón / Jie Meng; Cindy Shi / Lili Zhou | | | | not played |

- Canada vs Cuba

Canada
3
Club Regatas de Lima, Court 2
17 February 2006, 14:00 UTC−5

Cuba
1

| | | | 1 | 2 | 3 |
|---|---|---|---|---|---|---|
| 1 | (Canada) (Cuba) | Charmaine Reid; Lisandra Suárez | 21; 12 | 21; 16 |
| 2 | (Canada) (Cuba) | Florence Lavoie; Solángel Guzmán | 21; 7 | 21; 7 |
| 3 | (Canada) (Cuba) | Sarah MacMaster; Isaura Medina | 12; 21 | 21; 11 | 17; 21 |
| 4 | (Canada) (Cuba) | Helen Nichol / Charmaine Reid; Solángel Guzmán / Lisandra Suárez | 21; 9 | 21; 14 |
| 5 | (Canada) (Cuba) | Valerie Loker / Sarah MacMaster; Isaura Medina T2P2 = Leydi Edith Mora / {{{T2P2}}} | | | | not played |

==== Third place ====
- Cuba vs Peru

Cuba
3
Club Regatas de Lima, Court 2
18 February 2006, 09:00 UTC−5

Peru
2

| | | | 1 | 2 | 3 |
|---|---|---|---|---|---|
| 1 | (Cuba) (Peru) | Solángel Guzmán; Valeria Rivero | 22; 20 | 21; 16 |
| 2 | (Cuba) (Peru) | Lisandra Suárez; Claudia Rivero | 18; 21 | 16; 21 |
| 3 | (Cuba) (Peru) | Isaura Medina; Alejandra Monteverde | 15; 21 | 21; 18 | 21; 18 |
| 4 | (Cuba) (Peru) | Leydi Edith Mora / Lisandra Suárez; Jie Meng / Claudia Rivero | 17; 21 | 14; 21 |
| 5 | (Cuba) (Peru) | Solángel Guzmán / Isaura Medina; Doriana Rivera / Valeria Rivero | 21; 14 | 14; 21 | 21; 14 |

=== Final ===
- Canada vs United States

Canada
0
Club Regatas de Lima, Court 2
18 February 2006, 14:00 UTC−5

United States
3

| | | | 1 | 2 | 3 |
|---|---|---|---|---|---|---|
| 1 | (Canada) (United States) | Charmaine Reid; Eva Lee | 11; 21 | 20; 22 |
| 2 | (Canada) (United States) | Florence Lavoie; Lili Zhou | 9; 21 | 7; 21 |
| 3 | (Canada) (United States) | Sarah MacMaster; Cindy Shi | 18; 21 | 10; 21 |
| 4 | (Canada) (United States) | Helen Nichol / Charmaine Reid; Eva Lee / Mesinee Mangkalakiri | | | | not played |
| 5 | (Canada) (United States) | Amélie Felx / Valerie Loker; Cindy Shi / Lili Zhou | | | | not played |
