= Venezuela national badminton team =

National badminton team representing Venezuela

Venezuela
- Association: Federación Venezolana de Badminton (FVBAD)
- Confederation: BPA (Pan America)
- President: Dhayisbel Torrealba

BWF ranking
- Current ranking: 89 ▲1 (2 April 2024)
- Highest ranking: 69 (4 April 2023)

The Venezuela national badminton team (Spanish: Selección Venezolana de bádminton) represents Venezuela in international badminton team competitions. It is controlled by the Venezuelan Badminton Association, the governing body for Venezuelan badminton.

The Venezuelan Badminton Association was formed in 1960 and the national team competed in the 1959 Mexico City International held in Centro Deportivo Chapultepec, Mexico. Venezuela also competed in the first Pan Am Badminton Championships but did not compete in the mixed team event.

The Venezuelan team also competed in the South American Games. The Venezuelan junior team have competed in the BWF World Junior Championships mixed team event, which is also called the Suhandinata Cup.

== History ==
=== Mixed team ===
The Venezuelan mixed team competed in their first international team tournament at the 2009 Bolivarian Games. The team finished in third place. In 2013, the team competed in the 2013 Bolivarian Games mixed team event. The team lost the third place tie to the Dominican Republic. The team then competed in the next edition of the Bolivarian Games and finished fourth for a second time.

In the 2022 Bolivarian Games, the Venezuelan mixed team were eliminated in the quarter-finals after narrowly losing to the Dominican Republic. In 2023, Venezuela hosted the 2023 South American Badminton Championships. With home advantage, the team advanced to the semi-finals but lost 3–0 to Brazil. In the third place playoff, the team defeated Chile 3–0.

== Competitive record ==
=== Thomas Cup ===
Year	Round	Pos
1949 to 2024	Did not enter	
2026	To be determined	
2028	To be determined	
2030	To be determined	

=== Uber Cup ===
Year	Round	Pos
1957 to 2024	Did not enter	
2026	To be determined	
2028	To be determined	
2030	To be determined	

=== Sudirman Cup ===
Year	Round	Pos
1989 to 2023	Did not enter	
2025	To be determined	
2027	To be determined	
2029	To be determined	

=== Pan American Team Championships ===
==== Men's team ====
Year	Round	Pos
2016 to 2024	Did not enter	
2026	To be determined	
2028	To be determined	
2030	To be determined	

==== Women's team ====
Year	Round	Pos
2016 to 2024	Did not enter	
2026	To be determined	
2028	To be determined	
2030	To be determined	

==== Mixed team ====
Year	Round	Pos
1977 to 2023	Did not enter	
2025	To be determined	
2027	To be determined	
2029	To be determined	

=== South American Games ===
==== Mixed team ====
Year	Round	Pos
2010	Did not enter	
2018	Fourth place	4th
2022	Did not enter	

=== South American Team Championships ===
==== Men's team ====
Year	Round	Pos
1985	Did not enter	
1990	Did not enter	

==== Women's team ====
Year	Round	Pos
1990	Did not enter	

==== Mixed team ====
Year	Round	Pos
1984	Did not enter	
1988	Did not enter	
1996	Did not enter	
1998	Did not enter	
2012	Withdrew	
2013	Did not enter	
2014	Did not enter	
2015	Did not enter	
2016	Did not enter	
2017	Did not enter	
2018	Did not enter	
2019	Did not enter	
2020	Did not enter	
2022	Did not enter	
2023	Third place	3rd

=== Central American and Caribbean Games ===
==== Men's team ====
Year	Round	Pos
2010	Did not enter	

==== Women's team ====
Year	Round	Pos
2010	Did not enter	

==== Mixed team ====
Year	Round	Pos
1990	Did not enter	
1993	Did not enter	
2006	Did not enter	
2014	Did not enter	
2018	Did not enter	
2023	Group stage	7th

=== Bolivarian Games ===
==== Mixed team ====
Year	Round	Pos
2009	Third place	3rd
2013	Fourth place	4th
2017	Fourth place	4th
2022	Quarter-finals	5th

**Red border color indicates tournament was held on home soil.

== Junior competitive record ==
=== Suhandinata Cup ===
Year	Round	Pos
2000 to 2014	Did not enter	
2015	Group stage	37th
2016	Did not enter	
2017	Did not enter	
2018	Did not enter	
2019	Did not enter	
2022	Did not enter	
2023	Did not enter	
2024	Did not enter	

=== Pan American Junior Team Championships ===
==== Mixed team ====
Year	Round	Pos
1977 to 2023	Did not enter	
2024	To be determined	

=== South American Junior Team Championships ===
==== Mixed team ====
Year	Round	Pos
1997	Did not enter	
2000	Did not enter	
2001	Did not enter	
2005	Did not enter	
2009	Did not enter	
2012	Group stage	5th
2013	Did not enter	
2014	Did not enter	
2015	Did not enter	
2016	Did not enter	
2017	Did not enter	
2018	Did not enter	
2019	Did not enter	
2020	Did not enter	
2022	Did not enter	
2023	Did not enter	

**Red border color indicates tournament was held on home soil.

== Players ==
=== Current squad ===
As of 2 January 2024

==== Men's team ====
Name	DoB/Age	Ranking of event		
Name	DoB/Age	MS	MD	XD
William Barrios	10 June 2000 (age 25)	709	301	958
Frank Barrios	26 November 1998 (age 26)	333	301	411
Joiser Calanche	23 June 2000 (age 25)	894	281	633
Keiber Peñalver	25 April 2001 (age 24)	827	281	958

==== Women's team ====
Name	DoB/Age	Ranking of event		
Name	DoB/Age	WS	WD	XD
Daibelis Mendoza	24 September 2001 (age 23)	453	314	958
Damaris Ortiz	6 October 1998 (age 26)	682	314	-
Eslenny Parra	24 September 2000 (age 24)	528	589	958
Maria Rojas Camacho	27 June 2004 (age 21)	528	589	411

=== Previous squads ===
- South American Games: 2018
- South American Team Championships: 2012
- Bolivarian Games: 2017, 2022
