= 2006 Uber Cup qualification =

Tournament details
- Dates: February 8, 2006 – February 23, 2006
- Venue: BA: Sawai Mansingh Stadium Badminton Hall; BCA: National Badminton Centre; BE: Alexandreio Melathron; BO: Auckland Badminton Centre; BPA: Club de Regatas Lima
- Location: BA: Jaipur, India; BCA: Rose Hill, Mauritius; BE: Thessaloniki, Greece; BO: Auckland, New Zealand; BPA: Lima, Peru

The 2006 Uber Cup qualification process is a series of tournaments organised by the five IBF confederations to decide 10 of the 12 teams which will play in the 2006 Uber Cup, with Japan qualifying automatically as hosts and China trophy holders.

== Qualified teams ==
Country	Confederation	Qualified as	Qualified on	Final appearance
Japan	Badminton Asia	2006 Uber Cup hosts	August 2003	18th
China	Badminton Asia	2006 Uber Cup winners	16 May 2004	12th
South Africa	Badminton Africa	2006 Uber Cup Preliminaries for Africa winners	23 February 2006	2nd
South Korea	Badminton Asia	2006 Badminton Asia Uber Cup Preliminaries winners	18 February 2006	12th
Chinese Taipei	Badminton Asia	2006 Badminton Asia Uber Cup Preliminaries runners-up	18 February 2006	2nd
Singapore	Badminton Asia	2006 Badminton Asia Uber Cup Preliminaries semifinalists	18 February 2006	Debut
Hong Kong	Badminton Asia	2006 Badminton Asia Uber Cup Preliminaries semifinalists	18 February 2006	4th
Netherlands	Badminton Europe	2006 European Team Championships winners	19 February 2006	8th
England	Badminton Europe	2006 European Team Championships runners-up	19 February 2006	13th
Germany	Badminton Europe	2006 European Team Championships third place	19 February 2006	3rd
New Zealand	Badminton Oceania	2006 Uber Cup Preliminaries for Oceania winners	9 February 2006	5th
United States	Badminton Pan Am	2006 Pan American Uber Cup Preliminaries winners	18 February 2006	7th

== Qualification process ==
The number of teams participating in the final tournament is 12. The allocation of slots for each confederation is the same allocation from 2004 tournament; 4 from Asia, 3 from Europe, and 1 from each Africa, Oceania and Pan Am. Two automatic qualifiers are the host and defending champion.

== Confederation qualification ==
=== Badminton Confederation of Africa ===
The qualification for the African teams was held from 19 to 23 February 2006, at the National Badminton Centre in Rose Hill, Mauritius. The winners of the African qualification will qualify for the Uber Cup.

==== Teams in contention ====
Teams qualified for the Group stage

- Mauritius
- South Africa
- Seychelles
- Zambia

==== Round-robin ====
Pos	Team	Pld	Pts
1	South Africa	3	3
2	Mauritius	3	2
3	Seychelles	3	1
4	Zambia	3	0

Source: africa-badminton.com

=== Badminton Asia ===
The qualification for the Asian teams was held from 13 to 19 February 2006, at the Sawai Mansingh Stadium Badminton Hall in Jaipur, India. The semi-finalists of the Asian qualification will qualify for the Uber Cup.

==== Teams in contention ====
Teams qualified for the Group stage

- Chinese Taipei
- Hong Kong
- India
- Indonesia
- Iran
- Malaysia
- Pakistan
- Singapore
- South Korea
- Thailand

==== First round (group stage) ====
Advance to Knockout stage
Advance to Classification round

Group X

Pos	Team	Pld	Pts
1	South Korea	4	4
2	Chinese Taipei	4	2
3	Malaysia	4	2
4	Indonesia	4	2
5	Iran	4	0

Source: Badminton Asia
Group Y

Pos	Team	Pld	Pts
1	Hong Kong	4	4
2	Singapore	4	3
3	India	4	2
4	Thailand	4	1
5	Pakistan	4	0

Source: Badminton Asia

==== Second round (knockout stage) ====
Semi-finals
X1	South Korea	3
Y2	Singapore	0
Y1	Hong Kong	1
X2	Chinese Taipei	3

Final
Y2	South Korea	3
Y1	Chinese Taipei	0
Third place
Y2	Singapore	3
Y1	Hong Kong	0

=== Badminton Europe ===
The qualification for the European teams was held from 14 to 19 February 2006, at the Alexandreio Melathron in Thessaloniki, Greece. The semi-finalists of the European qualification will qualify for the Uber Cup.

==== Teams in contention ====
Teams qualified for the Group stage

- Austria
- Belarus
- Bulgaria
- Cyprus
- Czech Republic
- Denmark
- England
- Estonia
- Finland
- France
- Germany
- Greece
- Iceland
- Ireland
- Italy
- Netherlands
- Poland
- Portugal
- Scotland
- Slovenia
- Slovakia
- Spain
- Sweden
- Switzerland
- Turkey
- Ukraine
- Wales

==== First round (group stage) ====
Advance to Knockout stage

Group 1
Group 2
Group 3

Pos	Team	Pld	Pts
1	England	3	3
2	Bulgaria	3	2
3	Czech Republic	3	1
4	Cyprus	3	0

Source: BWF

Pos	Team	Pld	Pts
1	Germany	3	3
2	Poland	3	2
3	Belarus	3	1
4	Turkey	3	0

Source: BWF

Pos	Team	Pld	Pts
1	Scotland	3	3
2	Ukraine	3	2
3	Finland	3	1
4	Iceland	3	0

Source: BWF
Group 4
Group 5
Group 6

Pos	Team	Pld	Pts
1	Denmark	3	3
2	Portugal	3	2
3	Spain	3	1
4	Slovakia	3	0

Source: BWF

Pos	Team	Pld	Pts
1	Netherlands	3	3
2	Estonia	3	2
3	Ireland	3	1
4	Austria	3	0

Source: BWF

Pos	Team	Pld	Pts
1	France	3	3
2	Slovenia	3	2
3	Switzerland	3	1
4	Wales	3	0

Source: BWF
Group 7

Pos	Team	Pld	Pts
1	Sweden	2	2
2	Italy	2	1
3	Greece (H)	2	0

Source: BWF
(H) Host

==== Second round (knockout stage) ====
Quarter-finals
17 February 2006
England
Bye
Denmark	3
France	1
Netherlands	3
Scotland	0
Sweden	0
Germany	3

Semi-finals
18 February 2006
England	3
Denmark	0
Netherlands	3
Germany	2

Final
19 February 2006
England	0
Netherlands	3
Third place
19 February 2006
Denmark	1
Germany	3

=== Badminton Oceania ===
The qualification for the Oceanian teams was held from 8 to 9 February 2006, at the Auckland Badminton Centre in Auckland, New Zealand. The winner of the Oceania qualification will qualify for the Uber Cup.

==== Teams in contention ====
- Australia
- Fiji
- New Zealand
- Samoa

==== Round-robin ====
Pos	Team	Pld	Pts
1	New Zealand	3	3
2	Australia	3	2
3	Fiji	3	1
4	Samoa	3	0

Source: Badminton New Zealand

=== Badminton Pan Am ===
The qualification for the Pan Am teams was held from 15 to 18 February 2006, at Club de Regatas Lima in Lima, Peru. The winner of the Pan Am qualification will qualify for the Uber Cup.

==== Teams in contention ====
Teams qualified for the Group stage

- Brazil
- Canada
- Cuba
- Mexico
- Peru
- Trinidad and Tobago
- United States

==== First round (group stage) ====
Advance to Knockout stage

Group A

Pos	Team	Pld	Pts
1	Canada	2	2
2	Peru	2	1
3	Mexico	2	0

Source: BWF
Group B

Pos	Team	Pld	Pts
1	United States	3	3
2	Cuba	3	2
3	Brazil	3	1
4	Trinidad and Tobago	3	0

Source: BWF

==== Second round (knockout stage) ====
Semi-finals
17 February
Canada	3
Cuba	1
17 February
Peru	0
United States	3

Final
18 February
Canada	0
United States	3
Third place
18 February
Cuba	3
Peru	1
