= Badminton at the 2011 Pan American Games – Women's singles =

Badminton – Women's singles at the 2011 Pan American Games
- Venue: Multipurpose Gymnasium
- Dates: October 15 – October 20
- Competitors: 34 from 16 nations

Medalists
Gold medal	Michelle Li	Canada
Silver medal	Joycelyn Ko	Canada
Bronze medal	Claudia Rivero	Peru
Bronze medal	Victoria Montero	Mexico

The women's singles badminton event at the 2011 Pan American Games was held from October 15–20 at the Multipurpose Gymnasium in Guadalajara. The defending Pan American Games champion was Eva Lee of the United States, while the defending Pan American Championship champion was Cee Nantana Ketpura, also of the United States.

The athletes were drawn into an elimination stage draw. Once a team lost a match it was no longer able to compete. The draw for the competition was done on October 7, 2011.

== Seeds ==
1. Michelle Li (CAN) (champion)
2. Rena Wang (USA) (quarterfinals)
3. Joycelyn Ko (CAN) (finals)
4. Victoria Montero (MEX) (semifinals)
5. Claudia Rivero (PER) (semifinals)
6. Christina Aicardi (PER) (quarterfinals)
7. Iris Wang (USA) (quarterfinals)
8. Alejandra Monteverde (PER) (third round)

== Results ==
=== Finals ===
Quarterfinals
1	Michelle Li (CAN)	21	21
7	Iris Wang (USA)	15	16
4	Victoria Montero (MEX)	21	21
6	Christina Aicardi (PER)	15	10
Lohaynny Vicente (BRA)	11	12
3	Joycelyn Ko (CAN)	21	21
5	Claudia Rivero (PER)	21	21
2	Rena Wang (USA)	15	19

Semifinals
1	Michelle Li (CAN)	21	21
4	Victoria Montero (MEX)	10	7
3	Joycelyn Ko (CAN)	21	17	21
5	Claudia Rivero (PER)	9	21	10

Finals
1	Michelle Li (CAN)	21	21
3	Joycelyn Ko (CAN)	12	13

=== Top half ===
==== Section 1 ====
First Round

Second Round
1	M Li (CAN)	21	21
F Silba (BRA)	10	14
A de Leon (GUA)	21	21
O Cabrera (DOM)	12	8
7	I Wang (USA)	21	21
P Saravia (GUA)	11	13
C Leefmans (SUR)	21	21
V Valdesolo (ARG)	16	6

Third Round
1	M Li (CAN)	21	21
A de Leon (GUA)	14	6
7	I Wang (USA)	21	21
C Leefmans (SUR)	10	10

Quarterfinals
1	M Li (CAN)	21	21
7	I Wang (USA)	15	16

==== Section 2 ====
First Round
E Quintero (VEN)	4	3
N Rangel (MEX)	21	21

Second Round
4	V Montero (MEX)	21	21
K Wynter (JAM)	7	3
P Tjitrodipo (SUR)	16	8
E Capote (ECU)	21	21
6	C Aicardi (PER)	21	21
N Villegas (CHI)	19	9
M Hernandez (CUB)	20	21	24
N Rangel (MEX)	22	12	22

Third Round
4	V Montero (MEX)	21	21
E Capote (ECU)	5	18
6	C Aicardi (PER)	21	11	21
M Hernandez (CUB)	15	21	19

Quarterfinals
4	V Montero (MEX)	21	21
6	C Aicardi (PER)	15	10

=== Bottom half ===
==== Section 3 ====
First Round
B Vivieca (DOM)	14	21	24
L Vicente (BRA)	21	19	26

Second Round
L Vicente (BRA)	21	21
M Haldane (JAM)	17	7
R Ishaak (SUR)	11	9
8	A Monteverde (PER)	21	21
S Daneysha (PUR)	21	21
C Chou (CHI)	14	14
M Ugalde (MEX)	11	19
3	J Ko (CAN)	21	21

Third Round
L Vicente (BRA)	21	21
8	A Monteverde (PER)	18	18
S Daneysha (PUR)	9	7
3	J Ko (CAN)	21	21

Quarterfinals
L Vicente (BRA)	11	12
3	J Ko (CAN)	21	21

==== Section 4 ====
First Round

Second Round
S Sotomayor (GUA)	21	21
G Araujo (VEN)	6	12
S Watson (BAR)	8	8
5	C Rivero (PER)	21	21
L Vicente (BRA)	21	21
L Tovar (VEN)	8	8
C Mislenis (CUB)	10	11
2	R Wang (USA)	21	21

Third Round
N Sotomayor (GUA)	6	1
5	C Rivero (PER)	21	21
L Vicente (BRA)	18	8
2	R Wang (USA)	21	21

Quarterfinals
5	C Rivero (PER)	21	21
2	R Wang (USA)	15	19
