= Mexican National Badminton Championships =

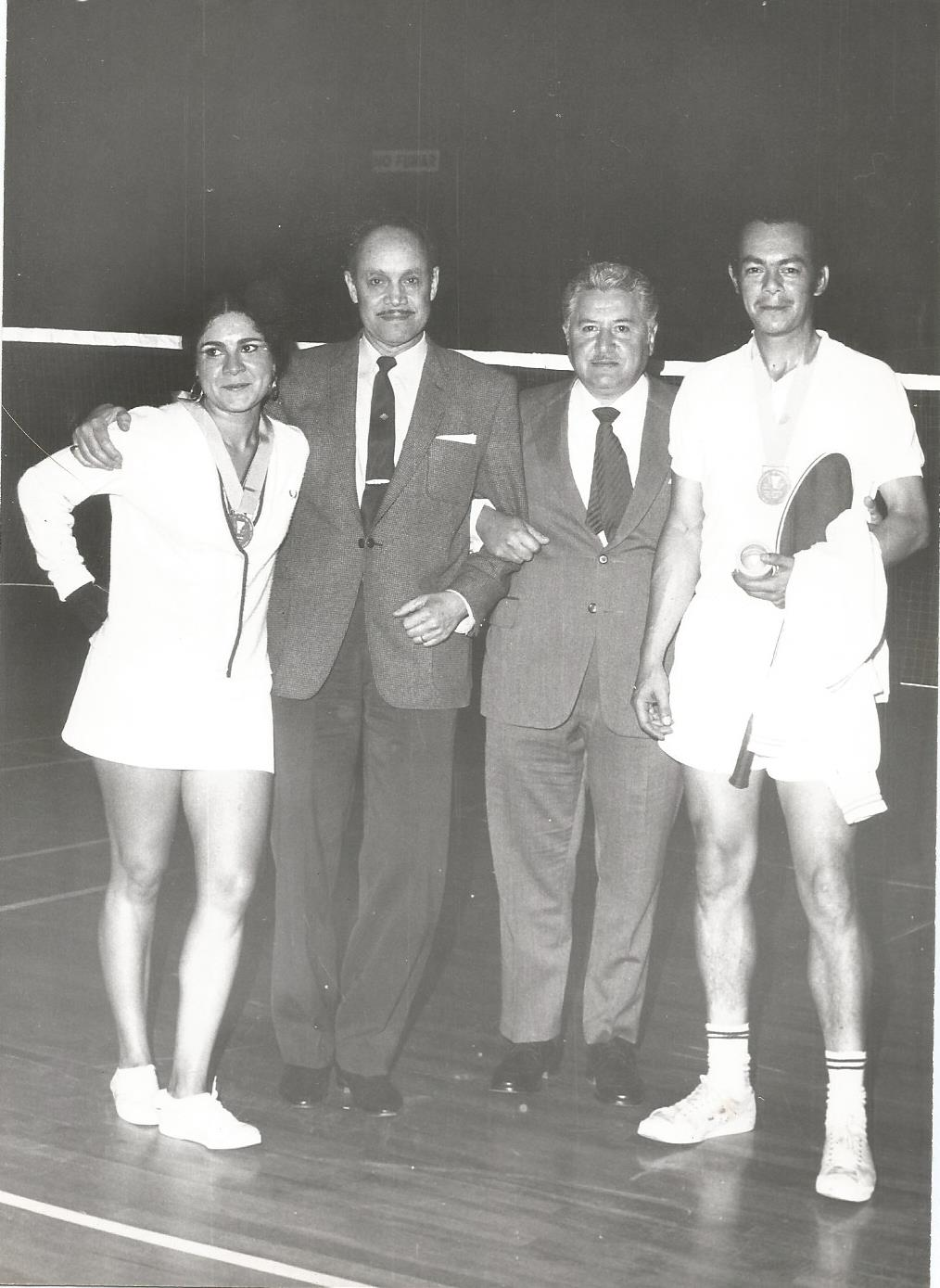
Mixed badminton competition in 1970

The Mexican National Championship of Badminton is a nationwide competition of badminton held in Mexico since 1933. This tournament was initially organised by the then "Asociación Mexicana de Badminton", together with the Centro Deportivo Chapultepec AC.

Since its beginning, the best Mexican players have competed in the Mexican National Championship of Badminton.

Traditionally, the tournament has been organised in five events or categories, namely, men's singles, women's singles, men's doubles, women's doubles, and mixed doubles.

Along with the Mexican National Championship of Badminton, another badminton competition has been held in Mexico called the Mexican National Open Championship of Badminton which main difference is that foreign badminton players can also participate in it. The original intention was that both tournaments would be held annually; however, due to different circumstances this has not always been the case.

Mexico is the Latin American country with the oldest tradition in badminton and this tournament is among the oldest competitions from the region.

== Winners ==
Year	Men's singles	Women's singles	Men's doubles	Women's doubles	Mixed doubles
1933	S. Dabrowski	Lena Strackbein	Francisco de la Macorra A. B. Pullen	Lena Strackbein F. de la Macorra	Francisco de la Macorra A. B. Pullen
1934	Francisco de la Macorra	Lena Strackbein	Francisco de la Macorra William R. Jennings	Lena Strackbein F. de la Macorra	William R. Jennings Lena Strackbein
1935	William R. Jennings	Lena Strackbein	Francisco de la Macorra William R. Jennings	Lena Strackbein F. de la Macorra	William R. Jennings Lena Strackbein
1936	Florentino Martínez Rico	Lena Strackbein	Florentino Martínez Rico William R. Jennings	L. Soto Hay A. Mayer	Florentino Martínez Rico P. Gutiérrez
1937	Florentino Martínez Rico	Lena Strackbein	Florentino Martínez Rico William R. Jennings	F. Martinez Rico A. Mayer	Florentino Martínez Rico P. Gutiérrez
1938	Florentino Martínez Rico	Norma Krafft	Florentino Martínez Rico T. O'Gorman	Norma Krafft J. Gómez Luna	Enrique Mathey Norma Krafft
1939	Florentino Martínez Rico	Norma Krafft	Ernesto Villareal Joaquin Zetina	Norma Krafft J. Gómez Luna	Ernesto Villareal Emilia Gómez Luna
1940	Ernesto Villareal	Emilia Gómez Luna	G. Martinez Ernesto Ibarra	Norma Voorhauer Emilia Gómez Luna	Ernesto Villareal Emilia Gómez Luna
1940 1954	No competition				
1955	Ernesto Villareal	Maria Eugenia Azuara	E. Gonzalez Arellano Francisco Aguirre	Carmela Martinez Maria Eugenia Azuara	E. Gonzalez Arellano Maria Elena Vivanco
1956	Sergio Fraustro	Maria Eugenia Azuara	No competition	Carmela Martinez Maria Eugenia Azuara	Fernando Molinar Maria Eugenia Azuara
1957	Sergio Fraustro	Maria Elena Vivanco	No competition	No competition	No competition
1958	Raúl Rangel	Carmela Martinez	Antonio Rangel Raúl Rangel	Carmela Martinez Ernestina Rivera	Fernando Molinar Carolina Allier
1959	Antonio Rangel	Carmela Martinez	Antonio Rangel Raúl Rangel	Carmela Martinez Maria Eugenia de del Rio	Antonio Rangel Ernestina Rivera
1960	Antonio Rangel	Carolina Allier	Antonio Rangel Raúl Rangel	Carolina Allier Ernestina Rivera	Antonio Rangel Ernestina Rivera
1961	Sergio Fraustro	Carmela Martinez	Antonio Rangel Raúl Rangel	Carmela Martinez Rosario de Villareal	Antonio Rangel Ernestina Rivera
1962	Antonio Rangel	Carolina Allier	Antonio Rangel Raúl Rangel	Carmela Martinez Maria Eugenia de del Rio	Oscar Lujan Josefina de Tinoco
1963	Sergio Fraustro	Carolina Allier	Antonio Rangel Raúl Rangel	Carolina Allier Ernestina Rivera	Antonio Rangel Carolina Allier
1964	Antonio Rangel	Lucero Soto	Antonio Rangel Raúl Rangel	Carolina Allier Lucero Soto	Antonio Rangel Carolina Allier
1965	Antonio Rangel	Carolina Allier	Salvador Peniche Guillermo Allier	Carolina Allier Ernestina Rivera	Antonio Rangel Carolina Allier
1966	Antonio Rangel	Carolina Allier	Antonio Rangel Raúl Rangel	Angelina Cazorla Lucero Soto	Antonio Rangel Lucero Soto
1967	Antonio Rangel	Carolina Allier	Antonio Rangel Raúl Rangel	Carolina Allier Rosario de Villareal	Oscar Lujan Josefina de Tinoco
1968	Roy Díaz González	Carolina Allier	Roy Díaz González Esteban Reyes	Carolina Allier Lucero Soto	Guillermo Allier Carolina Allier
1969	Roy Díaz González	Carolina Allier	Roy Díaz González Victor Jaramillo	Carolina Allier Lucero Soto	Guillermo Allier Carolina Allier
1970	Roy Díaz González	No competition	Roy Díaz González Victor Jaramillo	No competition	No competition
1971	Roy Díaz González	Lucero Soto de Peniche	Roy Díaz González Victor Jaramillo	No competition	No competition
1972	Roy Díaz González	Lucero Soto de Peniche	Roy Díaz González Victor Jaramillo	Lucero Soto de Peniche Susana Zenea	Roy Díaz González Josefina de Tinoco
1973	Roy Díaz González	No competition	Roy Díaz González Victor Jaramillo	Carolina Pizano de Velazquez María Eugenia Muñoz	Roy Díaz González Luz María Curiel
1974	Roy Díaz González	Susana Zenea	Roy Díaz González Jorge Palazuelos	Lucero Soto de Peniche Susana Zenea	Roy Díaz González Josefina de Tinoco
1975	Roy Díaz González	Susana Zenea	Roy Díaz González Jorge Palazuelos	Carolina Allier Josefina de Tinoco	Roy Díaz González Josefina de Tinoco
1976	Roy Díaz González	María Esther Luna Felix	Roy Díaz González Jorge Palazuelos	Melida Castelazo Susana Zarate	Roy Díaz González María Esther Luna Felix
1977	Victor Jaramillo	María Esther Luna Felix	Victor Jaramillo Ricardo Jaramillo	María de la Paz María Esther Luna Felix	Roy Díaz González Laura Michel
1978	Roy Díaz González	María Esther Luna Felix	Roy Díaz González Jorge Palazuelos	Monica Rivera María Antonieta Rivas	Hector Casillas Carolina Pizarro
1979	Roy Díaz González	María Esther Luna Felix	Ricardo Jaramillo Roberto Arredondo	No competition	Roberto Arredondo María de la Paz
1980	Roy Díaz González	María de la Paz	Ricardo Jaramillo Jorge Palazuelos	No competition	No competition
1981	Roy Díaz González	María de la Paz	Eugenio Tapia José Icaza	No competition	No competition
1982	Roy Díaz González	María de la Paz	Fernando de la Torre Ernesto de la Torre	No competition	No competition
1983	Roy Díaz González	María de la Paz	Fernando de la Torre Ernesto de la Torre	No competition	No competition
1984	Fernando de la Torre	Jan Pin He	Fernando de la Torre Ernesto de la Torre	No competition	No competition
1985	Roy Díaz González	Jan Pin He	Ernesto de la Torre Ricardo Jaramillo	No competition	No competition
1986	Fernando de la Torre	María de la Paz	Jorge Palazuelos Bernardo Monreal	María de la Paz Norma Hernandez	No competition
1987	Fernando de la Torre	María de la Paz	Fernando de la Torre Ernesto de la Torre	No competition	No competition
1988	Fernando de la Torre	María de la Paz	Eugenio Tapia Lorenzo Ruíz	No competition	No competition
1989	Fernando de la Torre	María de la Paz	Fernando de la Torre Ernesto de la Torre	No competition	No competition
1990	Fernando de la Torre	María de la Paz	Fernando de la Torre Ernesto de la Torre	No competition	Eugenio Tapia Margara Bravo Mariño
1991	Ernesto de la Torre	María de la Paz	Fernando de la Torre Luis Lopezllera	No competition	No competition
1992	Fernando de la Torre	María de la Paz	Fernando de la Torre Luis Lopezllera	No competition	Luis Lopezllera María de la Paz
1993	Viktor Serralde	No competition	No competition	No competition	No competition
1994 1995	No competition				
1996	Luis Lopezllera	Ana Laura de la Torre	Luis Lopezllera Ernesto de la Torre	Ana Laura de la Torre Laura Amaya	Bernardo Monreal Laura Amaya
1997	Bernardo Monreal	Verónica Estrada	Luis Lopezllera Bernardo Monreal	Verónica Estrada Laura Amaya	Bernardo Monreal Laura Amaya
1998	Bernardo Monreal	María de la Paz	Fernando de la Torre Luis Suárez	No competition	Bernardo Monreal Laura Amaya
1999	Fernando de la Torre	María de la Paz	Luis Lopezllera Bernardo Monreal	No competition	Gustavo Meré Gabriela Rodriguez
2000	Fernando de la Torre	Gabriela Rodríguez	Jesús Olvera Gustavo Meré	Laura Amaya Gabriela Rodríguez	Bernardo Monreal Laura Amaya
2001	Fernando de la Torre	Abigail García	Arturo Amaya Bernardo Monreal	Laura Amaya Gabriela Rodríguez	Arturo Amaya Gabriela Rodríguez
2002	Luis Lopezllera	Verónica Estrada	Arturo Amaya Bernardo Monreal	Verónica Estrada María de la Paz	Arturo Amaya Gabriela Melgoza
2003	Bernardo Monreal	Verónica Estrada	Jesús Aguilar Daniel Orozco	No competition	José Luis González Alcantar Naty Rangel
2004	Jesús Aguilar	Naty Rangel	Jesús Aguilar Daniel Orozco	Naty Rangel Marisol Dominguez	José Luis González Alcantar Naty Rangel
2005	José Luis González Alcantar	Rossina Nuñez	Jesús Aguilar Daniel Orozco	Naty Rangel Marisol Dominguez	José Luis González Alcantar Naty Rangel
2006	José Luis González Alcantar	Naty Rangel	Jesús Aguilar José Luis González Alcantar	Victoria Montero Rossina Nuñez	Jesús Aguilar Rossina Nuñez
2007	No competition				
2008	Salvador Sánchez	Victoria Montero	Lino Muñoz Andrés López	Cynthia González Naty Rangel	Jesús Aguilar Rossina Nuñez
2009	Lino Muñoz	Victoria Montero	José Luis Gonzalez Alcantar Andrés López	Victoria Montero Valeria Montero	José Luis González Alcantar Naty Rangel
2010	Lino Muñoz	Victoria Montero	Lino Muñoz Andrés López	Cynthia González Victoria Montero	Andrés López Victoria Montero
2011	Arturo Hernández	Victoria Montero	Arturo Hernandez Gabriel Aguilar	Cynthia González Victoria Montero	Arturo Hernandez Victoria Montero
2012	Lino Muñoz	Victoria Montero	Lino Muñoz Andrés López	Cynthia González Nydia González	Lino Muñoz Cynthia González
2013	Lino Muñoz	Haramara Gaitan	Lino Muñoz Andrés López	Cynthia González Victoria Montero	Lino Muñoz Cynthia González
2014	Lino Muñoz	Haramara Gaitan	Lino Muñoz Arturo Hernández	Cynthia González Mariana Ugalde	Lino Muñoz Cynthia González
