= 2023 South American Badminton Championships =

Tournament details
- Dates: 4–12 December
- Edition: 18th
- Venue: Polideportivo 2
- Location: Maracay, Venezuela

The 2023 South American Badminton Championships (Spanish: Campeonato Sudamericano Adulto de Badminton 2023) was a badminton tournament sanctioned by the South American Badminton Confederation and Badminton Pan America. The individual and mixed team events were held from 4 to 12 December 2023.

The tournament was held at Polideportivo 2 located in Avenida Intercomunal Santiago Mariño, Maracay, Venezuela. This marks the first South American championships hosted in Venezuela. Six countries took part in the tournament.

In the team event, Brazil regained the title after defeating rivals Peru 3–2 in the final while hosts Venezuela won against Chile 3–0 in the third place play-off.

== Medal summary ==
=== Medalists ===
Event	Gold	Silver	Bronze
Men's singles	(Brazil) Donnians Oliveira	(Brazil) Mateus Cutti	(Peru) Adriano Viale
Men's singles	(Brazil) Donnians Oliveira	(Brazil) Mateus Cutti	(Brazil) Alisson Vasconcellos
Women's singles	(Colombia) Juliana Giraldo	(Peru) Namie Miyahira	(Peru) Fernanda Saponara
Women's singles	(Colombia) Juliana Giraldo	(Peru) Namie Miyahira	(Peru) Estefania Canchanya
Men's doubles	(Brazil) Donnians Oliveira (Brazil) Matheus Voigt	(Peru) Alejandro Chueca (Peru) Sharum Durand	(Peru) Kalei Kuan-Veng (Peru) Brian Roque
Men's doubles	(Brazil) Donnians Oliveira (Brazil) Matheus Voigt	(Peru) Alejandro Chueca (Peru) Sharum Durand	(Brazil) Mateus Cutti (Brazil) Alisson Vasconcellos
Women's doubles	(Brazil) Tamires dos Santos (Brazil) Ana Julia Ywata	(Peru) Namie Miyahira (Peru) Fernanda Saponara	(Peru) Estefania Canchanya (Peru) Naomi Junco
Women's doubles	(Brazil) Tamires dos Santos (Brazil) Ana Julia Ywata	(Peru) Namie Miyahira (Peru) Fernanda Saponara	(Brazil) Isabella da Silva Carvalho (Chile) Valentina Rojas
Mixed doubles	(Brazil) Matheus Voigt (Brazil) Tamires dos Santos	(Peru) Adriano Viale (Peru) Fernanda Saponara	(Peru) Diego Subauste (Peru) Naomi Junco
Mixed doubles	(Brazil) Matheus Voigt (Brazil) Tamires dos Santos	(Peru) Adriano Viale (Peru) Fernanda Saponara	(Brazil) Donnians Oliveira (Brazil) Ana Julia Ywata
Mixed team	Brazil; João Aveiro; Mateus Cutti; Caio Henrique da Silva; Donnians Oliveira; Gabriel Souza; Alisson Vasconcellos; Matheus Voigt; Isabella da Silva Carvalho; Tamires dos Santos; Natalya Geisler; Ana Julia Ywata	Peru; Guillermo Buendía; Gonzalo Castillo; Alejandro Chueca; Sharum Durand; Kalei Kuan-Veng; José María Rendon; Brian Roque; Diego Subauste; Fabrizio Valdiviezo; Adriano Viale; Estefania Canchanya; Rafaela Castañeda; Naomi Junco; Taisia Kasianov; Namie Miyahira; Fernanda Saponara; Rafaela Silva; Analía Yi	Venezuela; Frank Barrios; William Barrios; Joiser Calanche; Wilson Cinco; José Machado; Gabriel Mendoza; Luis Rosales; Mariangel Garcia; Maria Fabiola Rojas; Daibelis Mendoza; Eslenny Parra; Yoerlis Peña; Maria Angelez Rojas

=== Medal table ===
* Host nation (Brazil)

Rank	Nation	Gold	Silver	Bronze	Total
1	Brazil*	5	1	3.5	9.5
2	Colombia	1	0	0	1
3	Peru	0	5	6	11
4	Venezuela	0	0	1	1
5	Chile	0	0	0.5	0.5
Totals (5 entries)		6	6	11	23

== Team event ==
=== Bracket ===
Quarter-finals
Colombia	1
Venezuela	3

Semi-finals
Peru	3
Chile	0
Venezuela	0
Brazil	3

Final
Peru	2
Brazil	3
Third place
Chile	0
Venezuela	3

=== Quarter-finals ===
Venezuela
3
Polideportivo 2, Court 1
4 December 2023, 09:00 UTC−4

Colombia
1

			1	2	3
1	(Venezuela) (Colombia)	Frank Barrios; Alejandro Potosi	21; 4	21; 11
2	(Venezuela) (Colombia)	Eslenny Parra; Juliana Giraldo	16; 21	11; 21
3	(Venezuela) (Colombia)	William Barrios / Joiser Calanche; Alejandro Potosi / Fabián Rodríguez	21; 8	21; 18
4	(Venezuela) (Colombia)	Mariangel Garcia / Maria Angelez Rojas; Laura Contreras / Carolina Ordoñez	21; 13	21; 10
5	(Venezuela) (Colombia)	Joiser Calanche / Maria Angelez Rojas; Fabián Rodríguez / Juliana Giraldo				not played

=== Semi-finals ===
Peru
3
Polideportivo 2, Court 3
4 December 2023, 15:00 UTC−4

Chile
0

			1	2	3
1	(Peru) (Chile)	Adriano Viale; Bruno Mora	21; 3	21; 3
2	(Peru) (Chile)	Fernanda Saponara; Josefina Reyes	21; 3	21; 5
3	(Peru) (Chile)	Alejandro Chueca / Diego Subauste; Bruno Mora / Martin Olmos	21; 12	21; 12
4	(Peru) (Chile)	Naomi Junco / Namie Miyahira; Francisca Riquelme / Valentina Rojas				not played
5	(Peru) (Chile)	Brian Roque / Estefania Canchanya; Martin Olmos / Valentina Rojas				not played

Brazil
3
Polideportivo 2, Court 1
4 December 2023, 15:00 UTC−4

Venezuela
0

			1	2	3
1	(Brazil) (Venezuela)	Donnians Oliveira; Frank Barrios	21; 17	21; 8
2	(Brazil) (Venezuela)	Ana Julia Ywata; Daibelis Mendoza	21; 19	22; 20
3	(Brazil) (Venezuela)	Donnians Oliveira / Matheus Voigt; William Barrios / Joiser Calanche	21; 7	21; 12
4	(Brazil) (Venezuela)	Tamires dos Santos / Ana Julia Ywata; Mariangel Garcia / Maria Angelez Rojas				not played
5	(Brazil) (Venezuela)	Matheus Voigt / Tamires dos Santos; Joiser Calanche / Maria Angelez Rojas				not played

=== Third place play-off ===
Chile
0
Polideportivo 2, Court 3
5 December 2023, 09:30 UTC−4

Venezuela
3

			1	2	3
1	(Chile) (Venezuela)	Bruno Mora / Valentina Rojas; Joiser Calanche / Maria Angelez Rojas	8; 21	6; 21
2	(Chile) (Venezuela)	Martin Olmos; Frank Barrios	8; 21	11; 21
3	(Chile) (Venezuela)	Francisca Riquelme; Eslenny Parra	5; 21	6; 21
4	(Chile) (Venezuela)	Bruno Mora / Martin Olmos; William Barrios / Joiser Calanche				not played
5	(Chile) (Venezuela)	Nicole Pantoja / Valentina Rojas; Mariangel Garcia / Maria Angelez Rojas				not played

=== Final ===
Brazil
3
Polideportivo 2, Court 1
5 December 2023, 09:30 UTC−4

Peru
2

			1	2	3
1	(Brazil) (Peru)	Matheus Voigt / Tamires dos Santos; Sharum Durand / Namie Miyahira	21; 19	21; 19
2	(Brazil) (Peru)	Donnians Oliveira; Adriano Viale	19; 21	17; 21
3	(Brazil) (Peru)	Ana Julia Ywata; Fernanda Saponara	20; 22	10; 21
4	(Brazil) (Peru)	Donnians Oliveira / Matheus Voigt; Diego Subauste / Adriano Viale	21; 19	21; 10
5	(Brazil) (Peru)	Tamires dos Santos / Ana Julia Ywata; Namie Miyahira / Fernanda Saponara	21; 17	21; 16
