= Badminton at the 2006 Central American and Caribbean Games =

Tournament details
- Dates: 15–30 July
- Edition: 3
- Venue: Pavilion of Parque del Este
- Location: Santo Domingo, Dominican Republic

The Badminton competition at the 2006 Central American and Caribbean Games was held in the Pavilion of Parque del Este in Santo Domingo, Dominican Republic as a sub-cities for Cartagena, Colombia. The tournament was scheduled to be held from 15–30 July 2006. It was the third appearance for badminton at the Games.

== Medal summary ==
=== Men's events ===
Event	Gold	Silver	Bronze
Singles	Kevin Cordón (GUA)	Ilian Perez (CUB)	Erick Anguiano (GUA)
Singles	Kevin Cordón (GUA)	Ilian Perez (CUB)	Pedro Yang (GUA)
Doubles	Guatemala; Erick Anguiano; Pedro Yang	Cuba; Lazaro Jerez; Ilian Perez	Guatemala; Rodolfo Ramirez; Kevin Cordón
Doubles	Guatemala; Erick Anguiano; Pedro Yang	Cuba; Lazaro Jerez; Ilian Perez	Cuba; Alexander Hernandez; Yunier Alvarez

=== Women's events ===
Event	Gold	Silver	Bronze
Singles	Solange Guzman (CUB)	Lissandra Suarez (CUB)	Marlin Maldonado (GUA)
Singles	Solange Guzman (CUB)	Lissandra Suarez (CUB)	Isaura Medina (CUB)
Doubles	Mexico; Marisol Dominguez; Naty Rangel	Cuba; Solange Guzman; Isaura Medina	Guatemala; Marlin Maldonado; Annelisse Micheo
Doubles	Mexico; Marisol Dominguez; Naty Rangel	Cuba; Solange Guzman; Isaura Medina	Mexico; Victoria Montero; Rossina Nunez

=== Mixed events ===
Event	Gold	Silver	Bronze
Doubles	Cuba; Solange Guzman; Ilian Perez	Cuba; Isaura Medina; Yunier Alvarez	Mexico; Marisol Dominguez; Jesus Aguilar
Doubles	Cuba; Solange Guzman; Ilian Perez	Cuba; Isaura Medina; Yunier Alvarez	Mexico; Naty Rangel; Jose Gonzalez
Team	Cuba; Ilian Perez; Lazaro Jerez; Alexander Hernandez; Yunier Alvarez; Solange Guzman; Isaura Medina; Lissandra Suarez; Leidys Mora	Guatemala; Erick Anguiano; Rodolfo Ramirez; Pedro Yang; Kevin Cordón; Marlin Maldonado; Annelisse Micheo; Jennifer Estrada; Karen Morales	Mexico; Jesus Aguilar; Jose Gonzalez; Daniel Orozco; Salvador Sánchez; Marisol Dominguez; Naty Rangel; Victoria Montero; Rossina Nunez

== Medal table ==
Rank	Nation	Gold	Silver	Bronze	Total
1	Cuba	3	5	2	10
2	Guatemala	2	1	5	8
3	Mexico	1	0	4	5
Totals (3 entries)		6	6	11	23

== Results ==
Men's singles

Semifinals
(Guatemala) Pedro Yang	21	15	18
(Guatemala) Kevin Cordón	19	21	21
(Cuba) Ilian Perez	21	21
(Guatemala) Erick Anguiano	14	13

Final
(Guatemala) Kevin Cordón
(Cuba) Ilian Perez

Women's singles

Semifinals
(Guatemala) Marlin Maldonado	19	18
(Cuba) Lissandra Suarez	21	21
(Cuba) Isaura Medina	16	21	15
(Cuba) Solange Guzman	21	18	21

Final
(Cuba) Lissandra Suarez
(Cuba) Solange Guzman

Men's doubles

Semifinals
(Cuba) Lazaro Jerez (Cuba) Ilian Perez	12	21	21
(Guatemala) Rodolfo Ramirez (Guatemala) Kevin Cordón	21	13	15
(Guatemala) Pedro Yang (Guatemala) Erick Anguiano	21	21
(Cuba) Alexander Hernandez (Cuba) Yunier Alvarez	5	9

Final
(Cuba) Lazaro Jerez (Cuba) Ilian Perez
(Guatemala) Pedro Yang (Guatemala) Erick Anguiano

Women's doubles

Semifinals
(Mexico) Victoria Montero (Mexico) Rossina Nunez	17	14
(Cuba) Solange Guzman (Cuba) Isaura Medina	21	21
(Guatemala) Marlin Maldonado (Guatemala) Annelisse Micheo	19	15
(Mexico) Marisol Dominguez (Mexico) Naty Rangel	21	21

Final
(Cuba) Solange Guzman (Cuba) Isaura Medina
(Mexico) Marisol Dominguez (Mexico) Naty Rangel

Mixed doubles

Semifinals
(Cuba) Yunier Alvarez (Cuba) Isaura Medina	21	23	21
(Mexico) Jesus Aguilar (Mexico) Marisol Dominguez	17	25	11
(Mexico) Jose Gonzalez (Mexico) Naty Rangel	24	15
(Cuba) Ilian Perez (Cuba) Solange Guzman	26	21

Final
(Cuba) Yunier Alvarez (Cuba) Isaura Medina
(Cuba) Ilian Perez (Cuba) Solange Guzman

== Participants ==
Country	Men's	Women's	Total athletes
Barbados (BAR)	Greg M. Padmore; Kevin L. Wood	–	2
Cuba (CUB)	Yunier Alvarez Bernal; Alexander Hernandez Acosta; Ilian Perez Jimenez; Lazaro Y. Jerez Cardenas	Solange Guzman Perez; Isaura C. Medina Marrero; Leidys E. Mora Orozco; Lissandra Suarez Benitez	8
Guatemala (GUA)	Erick Anguiano; Rodolfo Ramirez; Pedro Yang; Kevin Cordón	Marlin Maldonado; Annelisse Micheo; Jennifer Estrada; Karen Morales	8
Jamaica (JAM)	Bradley Graham; Emelio Mendez; Garron Palmer; Charles Pyne	Kristal Karjohn; Alya Lewis; Shawnekka M. Phillips; Nigella Saunders	8
Mexico (MEX)	Jesus D. Aguilar Rojas; Jose L. Gonzalez Alcantar; Daniel A. Orozco Franco; Salvador Sanchez Martinez	Marisol Dominguez Noriega; Victoria E. Montero Enriquez; Rossina E. Nunez Yanez; Naty L. Rangel de la Concha	8
Puerto Rico (PUR)	Julio E. Diaz Torres; Victor Perez Narvaez; Esteban M. Rivera Fuentes	Keara Gonzalez Starks	4
Dominican Republic (DOM)	Nelson Javier Ozuna; Héctor Pena; Francisco Sanchez Nova; Rafael A. Santin Ortiz	Nairobis Castillo; Marys Fiordaliza de Óleo Reyes; Yomaira Sanchez; Ana M. Sanchez Feliz	8
Suriname (SUR)	Gilmar Jones; Virgil Soeroredjo; Derrick Stjeward; Mitchel Wongsodikromo	Mireille Van Daal	5
Trinidad and Tobago (TRI)	Darron Charles; Kerwyn Pantin; Anil Seepaul; Glendon Thomas	Kesma Benito; Nekeisha Blake; Avril Plaza; Lisa Umraw	8
