= Victoria Montero =

Mexican badminton player

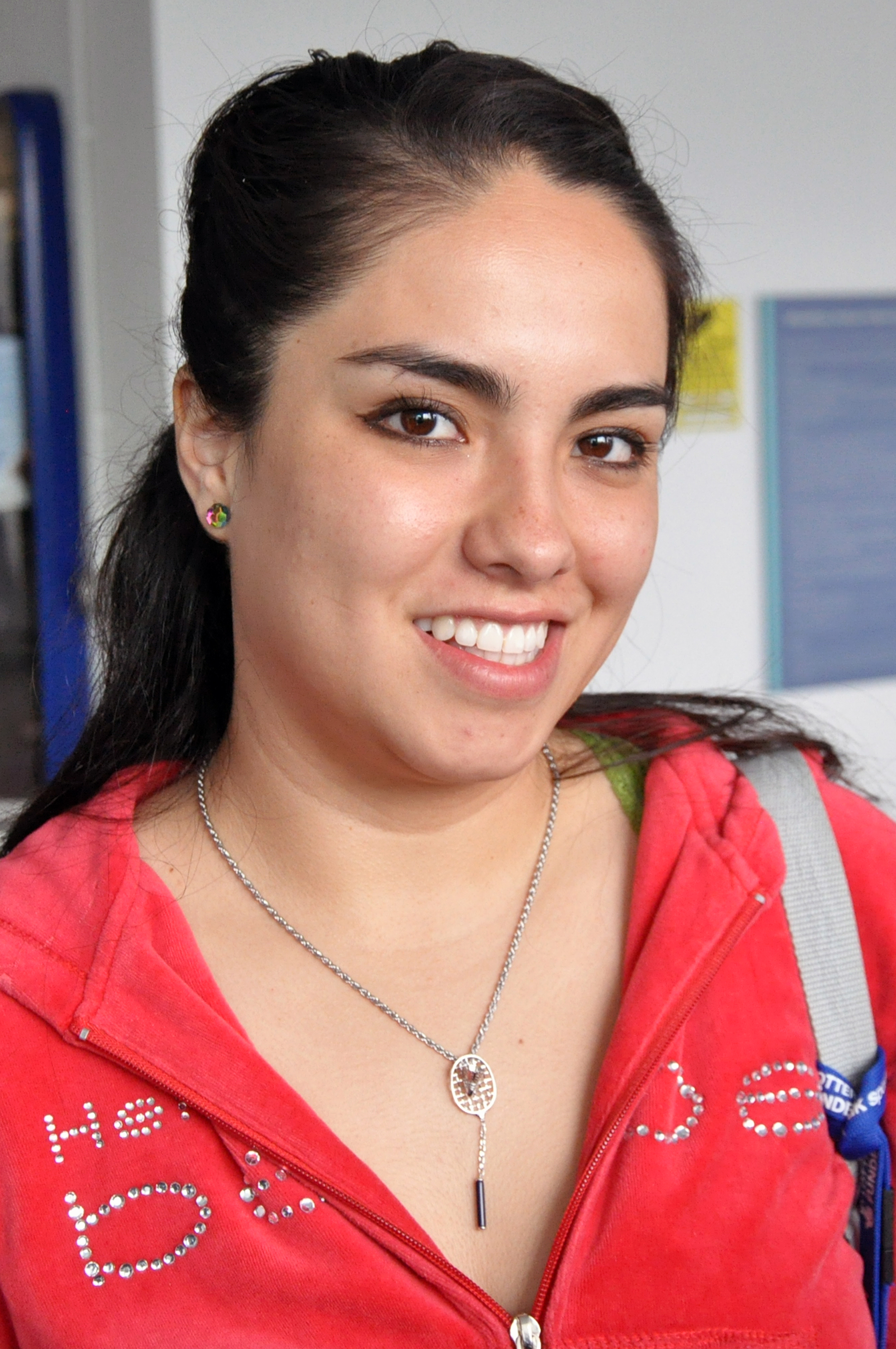

Personal information
- Born: Victoria Eugenia Montero Enríquez; 25 August 1991 (age 35) Mexico State, Mexico
- Height: 1.66 m (5 ft 5 in)
- Weight: 64 kg (141 lb)

Sport
- Country: Mexico
- Sport: Badminton

Women's singles & doubles
- Highest ranking: 63 (WS) 5 April 2012; 59 (WD) 8 September 2011; 83 (XD) 3 May 2012
- BWF profile
Medal record
Women's badminton
Representing Mexico
Pan American Games
Bronze medal – third place	2011 Guadalajara	Women's singles
Pan Am Championships
Bronze medal – third place	2009 Guadalajara	Mixed team
Central American and Caribbean Games
Gold medal – first place	2010 Mayagüez	Women's singles
Gold medal – first place	2010 Mayagüez	Women's doubles
Gold medal – first place	2010 Mayagüez	Women's team
Bronze medal – third place	2010 Mayagüez	Mixed doubles
Bronze medal – third place	2006 Cartagena	Women's doubles
Bronze medal – third place	2006 Cartagena	Mixed team
Pan Am Junior Championships
Silver medal – second place	2008 Guatemala City	Mixed team
Bronze medal – third place	2008 Guatemala City	Girls' singles

Victoria Montero (born Victoria Eugenia Montero Enríquez; 25 August 1991) is a Mexican athlete who competes in badminton. In 2010, she participated at the 2010 Central American and Caribbean Games where she won the gold medal in the singles, doubles and team competitions as well as the bronze medal at the mixed competition. In 2011, she participated at the Pan American Games where she won the bronze medal at the singles competition. In 2012, she secured her qualification to represent Mexico at the London Olympics to participate in the singles event via the world ranking. Montero did not advance to the knock-out stage after losing two matches against Tai Tzu-ying of Chinese Taipei, and Anu Nieminen of Finland in the group K stage.

== Achievements ==
=== Pan American Games ===
Women's singles
Year	Venue	Opponent	Score	Result
2011	Multipurpose Gymnasium; Guadalajara, Mexico	(Canada) Michelle Li	10–21, 7–21	Bronze

=== Central American and Caribbean Games ===
Women's singles
Year	Venue	Opponent	Score	Result
2010	Raymond Dalmau Coliseum; Mayagüez, Puerto Rico	(Mexico) Cynthia González	21–10, 21–12	Gold

Women's doubles
Year	Venue	Partner	Opponent	Score	Result
2010	Raymond Dalmau Coliseum; Mayagüez, Puerto Rico	(Mexico) Cynthia González	(Puerto Rico) Jaylene Forrester (Puerto Rico) Keara Gonzalez	21–12, 21–12	Gold
2006	Pavilion of Parque del Este; Santo Domingo, Dominican Republic	(Mexico) Rossina Nunez	(Cuba) Solange Guzman (Cuba) Isaura Medina	17–21, 14–21	Bronze

Mixed doubles
Year	Venue	Partner	Opponent	Score	Result
2010	Raymond Dalmau Coliseum; Mayagüez, Puerto Rico	(Mexico) Andrés López	(Jamaica) Garron Palmer (Jamaica) Alya Lewis	11–21, 21–15, 14–21	Bronze

=== Pan Am Junior Championships ===
Girls' singles
Year	Venue	Opponent	Score	Result
2008	Guatemala City, Guatemala	(United States) Rena Wang	8–21, 22–24	Bronze

=== BWF International Challenge/Series ===
Women's singles
Year	Tournament	Opponent	Score	Result
2011	Internacional Mexicano	(Slovakia) Monika Fasungova	No match	(gold) Winner
2011	Miami International	(Greece) Anne Hald Jensen	9–21, 9–21	(silver) Runner-up
2011	Santo Domingo Open	(Greece) Anne Hald Jensen	13–21, 11–21	(silver) Runner-up
2010	Internacional Mexicano	(Mexico) Mariana Ugalde	21–19, 7–21, 21–18	(gold) Winner
2009	Mexican International	(United States) Karyn Velez	13–21, 21–12, 15–21	(silver) Runner-up
2008	Puerto Rico International	(Peru) Alejandra Monteverde	21–13, 15–21, 21–18	(gold) Winner

Women's doubles
Year	Tournament	Partner	Opponent	Score	Result
2013	Internacional Mexicano	(Mexico) Cynthia González	(Brazil) Paula Pereira (Brazil) Lohaynny Vicente	18–21, 21–17, 11–21	(silver) Runner-up
2011	Mexican International	(Mexico) Cynthia González	(Brazil) Lohaynny Vicente (Brazil) Luana Vicente	10–21, 19–21	(silver) Runner-up
2011	Giraldilla International	(Mexico) Cynthia González	(Indonesia) Dwi Agustiawati (Indonesia) Ayu Rahmasari	14–21, 6–21	(silver) Runner-up
2010	Internacional Mexicano	(Mexico) Cynthia González	(Mexico) Deyanira Angulo (Mexico) Aileen Chiñas	21–15, 21–13	(gold) Winner
2010	Miami PanAm International	(Mexico) Cynthia González	(Germany) Nicole Grether (Canada) Charmaine Reid	11–21, 12–21	(silver) Runner-up
2009	Mexican International	(United States) Karyn Velez	(Mexico) Marisol Dominguez (Mexico) Naty Rangel	21–17, 24–26, 21–7	(gold) Winner

Mixed doubles
Year	Tournament	Partner	Opponent	Score	Result
2011	Internacional Mexicano	(Mexico) Andrés López	(Mexico) Lino Munoz (Mexico) Cynthia González	21–19, 20–22, 21–14	(gold) Winner
2010	Internacional Mexicano	(Mexico) Andrés López	(New Zealand) Bjorn Seguin (Mexico) Deyanira Angulo	21–15, 21–18	(gold) Winner
2009	Mexican International	(Mexico) David Melo	(Mexico) Jose Luis Gonzalez (Mexico) Naty Rangel	14–21, 19–21	(silver) Runner-up
2008	Puerto Rico International	(Mexico) Jesus Aguilar	(Peru) Andrés Corpancho (Peru) Katherine Winder	10–22, 10–21	(silver) Runner-up

BWF International Challenge tournament
BWF International Series tournament
BWF Future Series tournament
