= Badminton at the 2013 Bolivarian Games – Mixed team =

The badminton mixed team tournament, for the 2013 Bolivarian Games started on 17 November to 18 November 2013.

== Results ==
=== Group stage ===
==== Group A ====
Team	Pld	W	L
Peru	2	2	0
Venezuela	2	1	1
Colombia	2	0	2

==== Group B ====
Team	Pld	W	L
Guatemala	3	3	0
Dominican Republic	3	2	1
Chile	3	1	2
Ecuador	3	0	3

== Final stage ==
Semifinals
1	Peru
4	Dominican Republic
3	Guatemala
2	Venezuela

Finals
Peru
Guatemala
