= Pedro Yang =

Guatemalan badminton player (born 1976)

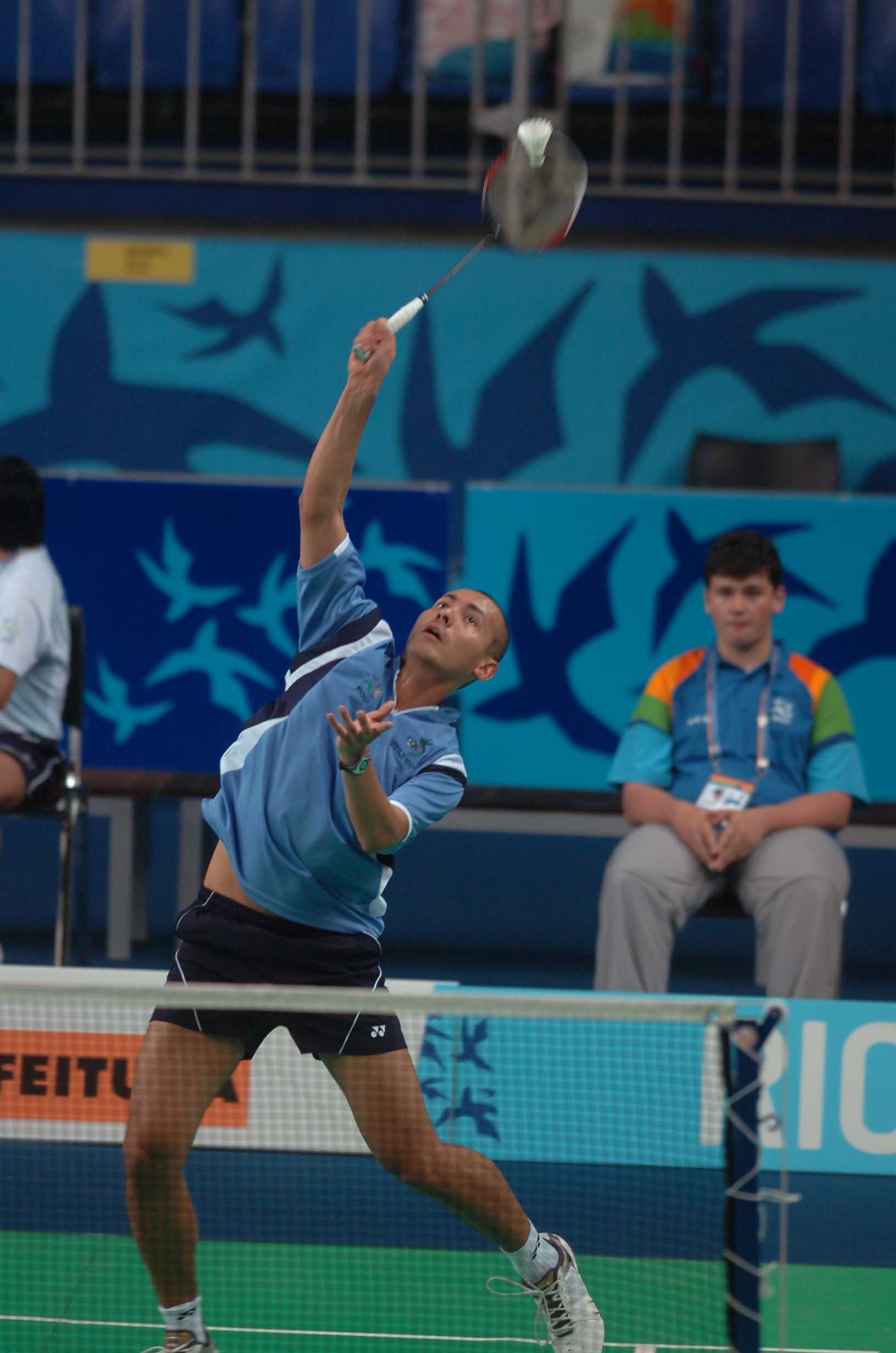
- Pedro Yang at the Pan American Games in Rio 2007

Personal information
- Born: Pedro Alejandro Yang Ruiz Guatemala City, Guatemala

Sport
- Country: Guatemala
- Sport: Badminton
- Handedness: Right

Men's singles & doubles
- Highest ranking: 134 (27 October 2011)
Medal record
Men's Badminton
Representing Guatemala
Pan American Games
Silver medal – second place	2003 Santo Domingo	Doubles
Bronze medal – third place	1999 Winnipeg	Singles
Bronze medal – third place	2003 Santo Domingo	Singles
Bronze medal – third place	2007 Rio de Janeiro	Doubles
Central American and Caribbean Games
Gold medal – first place	2006 Cartagena	Doubles
Silver medal – second place	2006 Cartagena	Mixed Team
Bronze medal – third place	2006 Cartagena	Singles
Gold medal – first place	2010 Mayagüez	Team
Silver medal – second place	2010 Mayagüez	Singles

Pedro Alejandro Yang Ruiz is a retired male badminton player from Guatemala.

== Biography ==
Yang played badminton at the 2004 Summer Olympics in men's singles, losing in the round of 32 to Jim Ronny Andersen of Norway.

Yang has won a gold medal at the 2002 Central American and Caribbean Games in El Salvador and bronze medals at the 1999 Pan American Games in Winnipeg, Manitoba, Canada and the 2003 Pan American Games in Santo Domingo, Dominican Republic.

Pedro Yang was appointed to the International Olympic Committee Athletes Commission from 2008 to 2016, Radio & TV Commission 2008–2013, and Athletes Entourage Commission from 2014.

Pedro Yang was appointed to the World Baseball Softball Confederation's Ethics Commission from 2016 to 2018 and served in the Badminton World Federation Athletes Commission from 2001 to 2016.

Pedro Yang is today a member of the ‘Champions for Peace’ club, a group of elite athletes committed to serving peace in the world through sport, created by Peace and Sport, a Monaco-based international organization.

== Degrees ==
- BA with Honours in Business Administration (Strategy & Management, De Montfort University, UK/ Niels Brock College DK.
- Marketing Management Degree, Niels Brock College Copenhagen, DK.
