= Naty Rangel =

Mexican badminton player (born 1988)

Personal information
- Born: Naty Liliana Rangel de la Concha; 10 August 1988 (age 38)

Sport
- Country: Mexico
- Sport: Badminton
- Event: Women's singles & doubles

Women's singles & doubles
- BWF profile
Medal record
Women's badminton
Representing Mexico
Pan Am Championships
Bronze medal – third place	2009 Guadalajara	Mixed team
Bronze medal – third place	2007 Calgary	Women's doubles
Central American and Caribbean Games
Gold medal – first place	2006 Cartagena	Women's doubles
Bronze medal – third place	2006 Cartagena	Mixed doubles
Bronze medal – third place	2006 Cartagena	Mixed team

Naty Liliana Rangel de la Concha (born 10 August 1988) is a Mexican badminton player. She was part of the national team that competed at the 2006 Central American and Caribbean Games and won a gold medal in the women's doubles event also two bronze medals from mixed doubles and team events. Rangel participated at the 2007 and 2011 Pan American Games.

== Achievements ==
=== Pan Am Championships ===
Women's doubles
Year	Venue	Partner	Opponent	Score	Result
2007	Calgary Winter Club; Calgary, Canada	(Mexico) Rossina Nuñez	(United States) Mesinee Mangkalakiri (United States) Eva Lee	10–21, 12–21	Bronze

=== Central American and Caribbean Games ===
Women's doubles
Year	Venue	Partner	Opponent	Score	Result
2006	Pavilion of Parque del Este; Santo Domingo, Dominican Republic	(Mexico) Marisol Domínguez	(Cuba) Solange Guzman (Cuba) Isaura Medina		Gold

Mixed doubles
Year	Venue	Partner	Opponent	Score	Result
2006	Pavilion of Parque del Este; Santo Domingo, Dominican Republic	(Mexico) José González	(Cuba) Ilian Perez (Cuba) Solange Guzman	24–26, 15–21	Bronze

=== BWF International Challenge/Series ===
Women's doubles
Year	Tournament	Partner	Opponent	Score	Result
2009	Mexican International	(Mexico) Marisol Domínguez	(Mexico) Victoria Montero (United States) Karyn Velez	17–21, 26–24, 7–21	(silver) Runner-up

Mixed doubles
Year	Tournament	Partner	Opponent	Score	Result
2009	Internacional Mexicano	(Mexico) José González	(Mexico) David Melo (Mexico) Victoria Montero	21–14, 21–19	(gold) Winner

BWF International Challenge tournament
BWF International Series tournament
BWF Future Series tournament
