= 2006 Thomas & Uber Cup Preliminaries for Oceania =

Tournament details
- Dates: 8–9 February
- Nations: 4 (Men's team); 4 (Women's team)
- Venue: Auckland Badminton Centre
- Location: Auckland, New Zealand

The 2006 Thomas & Uber Cup Preliminaries for Oceania was a continental badminton team championships in Oceania sanctioned by the Badminton World Federation. The tournament was held from 8 to 9 February 2006.

== Tournament ==
The 2006 Thomas & Uber Cup Preliminaries for Oceania was a continental team tournament of badminton held to determine the best men's and women's team in Oceania, who would qualify to 2006 Thomas & Uber Cup. This tournament was organized by Badminton Oceania and was sanctioned by the Badminton World Federation.

=== Venue ===
The tournament was held at the Auckland Badminton Centre in Auckland, New Zealand.

=== Competition format ===
The competition was held using a half-competition system (round-robin) with each team competing against each other once.

=== Tiebreakers ===
The rankings of teams in each group were determined per BWF Statutes Section 5.1, Article 16.3:

1. Number of matches won;
2. Match result between the teams in question;
3. Match difference in all group matches;
4. Game difference in all group matches;
5. Point difference in all group matches.

== Men's team ==
=== Round-robin ===
Pos	Team	Pld	W	L	MF	MA	MD	Pts	Qualification	New Zealand	Australia	Fiji	Samoa
1	New Zealand	3	3	0	14	1	+13	3	2006 Thomas Cup	—	4–1	5–0	5–0
2	Australia	3	2	1	11	4	+7	2			—	5–0	5–0
3	Fiji	3	1	2	5	10	−5	1				—	5–0
4	Samoa	3	0	3	0	15	−15	0					—

Source: Badminton New Zealand

== Women's team ==
Pos	Team	Pld	W	L	MF	MA	MD	Pts	Qualification	New Zealand	Australia	Fiji	Samoa
1	New Zealand	3	3	0	13	2	+11	3	2006 Uber Cup	—	3–2	5–0	5–0
2	Australia	3	2	1	12	3	+9	2			—	5–0	5–0
3	Fiji	3	1	2	5	10	−5	1				—	5–0
4	Samoa	3	0	3	0	15	−15	0					—

Source: Badminton New Zealand
