= Solángel Guzmán =

Cuban-Trindadian badminton player

Personal information
- Born: Solángel Guzmán Pérez; 21 December 1984 (age 41) Pinar del Rio, Cuba

Sport
- Country: Trinidad and Tobago
- Sport: Badminton

Women's
- Highest ranking: 151 (WS) 21 Nov 2013; 161 (WD) 12 Nov 2009; 236 (XD) 22 Oct 2009
- BWF profile
Medal record
Badminton
Representing Cuba
Central American and Caribbean Games
Gold medal – first place	2006 Cartagena	Women's singles
Gold medal – first place	2006 Cartagena	Mixed doubles
Gold medal – first place	2006 Cartagena	Mixed team
Silver medal – second place	2006 Cartagena	Women's doubles
Representing Trinidad and Tobago
Pan Am Championships
Bronze medal – third place	2013 Santo Domingo	Women's singles

Solángel Guzmán Pérez (born 21 December 1984) is a Cuban female badminton player, and now represented Trinidad and Tobago. Guzman was a top badminton player in Cuba, where she became a Pan Am Games doubles quarter-finalist, a CAC singles champion and also medalled at the Peru Open, as well as tournaments in Brazil, Venezuela and Dominican Republic. Since arriving in T&T, she has also dominated the local badminton scene, taking the triple crown in every tournament.

== Achievements ==
=== Pan Am Championships ===
Women's singles
Year	Venue	Opponent	Score	Result
2013	Palacio de los Deportes Virgilio Travieso Soto; Santo Domingo, Dominican Republic	(United States) Jamie Subandhi	15–21, 9–21	Bronze

=== Central American and Caribbean Games ===
Women's singles
Year	Venue	Opponent	Score	Result
2006	Pavilion of Parque del Este; Santo Domingo, Dominican Republic	(Cuba) Lisandra Suárez		Gold

Women's doubles
Year	Venue	Partner	Opponent	Score	Result
2006	Pavilion of Parque del Este; Santo Domingo, Dominican Republic	(Cuba) Isaura Medina	(Mexico) Marisol Dominguez (Mexico) Naty Rangel		Silver

Mixed doubles
Year	Venue	Partner	Opponent	Score	Result
2006	Pavilion of Parque del Este; Santo Domingo, Dominican Republic	(Cuba) Ilian Perez	(Cuba) Yunier Alvarez (Cuba) Isaura Medina		Gold

=== BWF International Challenge/Series ===
Women's singles
Year	Tournament	Opponent	Score	Result
2016	Suriname International	(Barbados) Tamisha Williams	24–26, 21–12, 21–5	(gold) Winner
2016	Carebaco International	(Wales) Aimee Moran	18–21, 19–21	(silver) Runner-up
2015	Carebaco International	(Dominican Republic) Daigenis Saturria	21–9, 21–11	(gold) Winner
2014	Carebaco International	(Barbados) Tamisha Williams	21–4, 21–11	(gold) Winner
2013	Suriname International	(Mexico) Haramara Gaitan	21–19, 20–22, 21–19	(gold) Winner
2013	Venezuela International	(Guatemala) Ana Lucia De Leon	21–14, 21–4	(gold) Winner
2012	Venezuela International	(Chile) Camila Macaya	21–11, 21–8	(gold) Winner
2012	Carebaco International	(Canada) Nicole Grether	7–21, 12–21	(silver) Runner-up
2009	Peru International	(Peru) Claudia Rivero	18–21, 15–21	(silver) Runner-up
2009	Giraldilla International	(Cuba) María L. Hernández	21–17, 18–21, 21–18	(gold) Winner
2008	Giraldilla International	(United States) Lauren Todt	21–10, 21–12	(gold) Winner
2007	Giraldilla International	(Italy) Agnese Allegrini	11–21, 13–21	(silver) Runner-up

Women's doubles
Year	Tournament	Partner	Opponent	Score	Result
2016	Suriname International	(Trinidad and Tobago) Jada Renales	(Suriname) Sherifa Jameson (Suriname) Anjali Paragsingh	21–11, 21–9	(gold) Winner
2013	Suriname International	(Trinidad and Tobago) Virginia Chariandy	(Suriname) Crystal Leefmans (Suriname) Priscila Tjitrodipo	21–23, 16–21	(silver) Runner-up
2012	Venezuela International	(Trinidad and Tobago) Virginia Chariandy	(Chile) Chou Ting Ting (Chile) Camila Macaya	15–21, 21–17, 21–17	(gold) Winner
2012	Carebaco International	(Trinidad and Tobago) Virginia Chariandy	(Canada) Nicole Grether (Canada) Charmaine Reid	12–21, 11–21	(silver) Runner-up
2009	Peru International	(Cuba) Lisandra Suárez	(Peru) Cristina Aicardi (Peru) Claudia Rivero	12–21, 21–16, 16–21	(silver) Runner-up
2009	Giraldilla International	(Cuba) Lisandra Suárez	(Peru) Katherine Winder (Peru) Claudia Zornoza	21–14, 26–24	(gold) Winner
2008	Giraldilla International	(Cuba) María L. Hernández	(Cuba) Keylin Jimenez (Cuba) Lisandra Suárez	21–12, 21–9	(gold) Winner
2007	Giraldilla International	(Cuba) Leydi Edith Mora	(Peru) Jie Meng (Peru) Valeria Rivero	21–15, 16–21, 21–12	(gold) Winner
2006	Giraldilla International	(Cuba) Isaura Medina	(Cuba) Leydi Edith Mora (Cuba) Lisandra Suárez		(gold) Winner

Mixed doubles
Year	Tournament	Partner	Opponent	Score	Result
2016	Suriname International	(Trinidad and Tobago) Alistair Espinoza	(Israel) Misha Zilberman (Israel) Svetlana Zilberman	14–21, 15–21	(silver) Runner-up
2012	Venezuela International	(Trinidad and Tobago) Rahul Rampersad	(Spain) Oskar Martinez (Spain) Maria Vijande	23–21, 19–21, 22–20	(gold) Winner
2009	Giraldilla International	(Cuba) Osleni Guerrero	(Cuba) Alexander Hernandez (Cuba) María L. Hernández	17–21, 12–21	(silver) Runner-up
2008	Giraldilla International	(Cuba) Alexander Hernandez	(Cuba) Osleni Guerrero (Cuba) Lisandra Suárez	17–21, 17–21	(silver) Runner-up
2004	Giraldilla International	(Cuba) Ilian Perez	(Cuba) Yunier Alvarez (Cuba) Isaura Medina	15–7, 15–12	(gold) Winner
2002	Cuba International	(Cuba) Ilian Perez	(Cuba) Lázaro Yonier Jérez (Cuba) Dayanis Alvarez	5–7, 3–7, 6–8	(silver) Runner-up

BWF International Challenge tournament
BWF International Series tournament
BWF Future Series tournament
