= 2021 BWF season =

Badminton World Federation circuit

Details
- Duration: 12 January – 19 December
- Categories: Grade 1 – (Olympics, Individuals, Teams, Mixed Teams): 4; Grade 2 – BWF World Tour Finals: 1; Grade 2 – Super 1000: 3; Grade 2 – Super 750: 3; Grade 2 – Super 500: 2; Grade 2 – Super 300: 3; Grade 2 – Super 100: 1; Grade 3 – International Challenge: 16; Grade 3 – International Series: 18; Grade 3 – Future Series: 14; Continental Championships: TBD

Achievements (singles)

Awards
- Player of the year: (Denmark) Viktor Axelsen (male, 2020–2021) (Chinese Taipei) Tai Tzu-ying (female, 2020–2021) (Indonesia) Greysia Polii (pair, 2020–2021) (Indonesia) Apriyani Rahayu (pair, 2020–2021)

The 2021 BWF season was the overall badminton circuit organized by the Badminton World Federation (BWF) for the 2021 badminton season to publish and promote the sport. The world badminton tournament in 2021 consisted of:
1. BWF tournaments (Grade 1; Major Events)

- BWF World Men and Women's Team Championships (Thomas & Uber Cup)
- BWF World Mixed Team Championships (Sudirman Cup)
- Olympic Games
- BWF World Championships

2. BWF World Tour (Grade 2)

- Level 1 (BWF World Tour Finals)
- Level 2 (BWF World Tour Super 1000)
- Level 3 (BWF World Tour Super 750)
- Level 4 (BWF World Tour Super 500)
- Level 5 (BWF World Tour Super 300)
- Level 6 (BWF Tour Super 100)

3. Continental Circuit (Grade 3) BWF Open Tournaments: BWF International Challenge, BWF International Series, and BWF Future Series.

The Thomas & Uber Cup were teams event. The Sudirman Cup were mixed teams event. The others – Super 1000, Super 750, Super 500, Super 300, Super 100, International Challenge, International Series, and Future Series are all individual tournaments. The higher the level of tournament, the larger the prize money and the more ranking points available.

The 2021 BWF season calendar comprises these six levels of BWF tournaments.

== Schedule ==
This is the complete schedule of events on the 2021 calendar, with the champions and runners-up documented.

Key

Olympic/World Championships
World Tour Finals
Super 1000
Super 750
Super 500
Super 300
Super 100
International Challenge
International Series
Future Series
Continental events/Team Events

=== January ===
Week commencing	Tournament	Champions	Runners-up
11 January	Thailand Masters (Draw) (cancelled) (Note: Tournament cancelled due to the COVID-19 pandemic.): Host: Bangkok, Thailand; Venue: Indoor Stadium Huamark; Level: Super 300; Prize: $200,000; Format: 32MS/32WS/32MD/32WD/32XD		
11 January	Thailand Masters (Draw) (cancelled): Host: Bangkok, Thailand; Venue: Indoor Stadium Huamark; Level: Super 300; Prize: $200,000; Format: 32MS/32WS/32MD/32WD/32XD	Score:	
11 January	Thailand Masters (Draw) (cancelled): Host: Bangkok, Thailand; Venue: Indoor Stadium Huamark; Level: Super 300; Prize: $200,000; Format: 32MS/32WS/32MD/32WD/32XD	Score:	
11 January	Thailand Masters (Draw) (cancelled): Host: Bangkok, Thailand; Venue: Indoor Stadium Huamark; Level: Super 300; Prize: $200,000; Format: 32MS/32WS/32MD/32WD/32XD	Score:	
11 January	Thailand Masters (Draw) (cancelled): Host: Bangkok, Thailand; Venue: Indoor Stadium Huamark; Level: Super 300; Prize: $200,000; Format: 32MS/32WS/32MD/32WD/32XD	Score:	
11 January	Thailand Masters (Draw) (cancelled): Host: Bangkok, Thailand; Venue: Indoor Stadium Huamark; Level: Super 300; Prize: $200,000; Format: 32MS/32WS/32MD/32WD/32XD	Score:	
11 January	Estonian International (cancelled) (Note: Tournament cancelled due to the COVID-19 pandemic on 8 December 2020.): Host: Tallinn, Estonia; Venue: Kalev Sports Hall; Level: International Series; Prize: $10,000; Format: 32MS/32WS/32MD/32WD/32XD		
11 January	Estonian International (cancelled): Host: Tallinn, Estonia; Venue: Kalev Sports Hall; Level: International Series; Prize: $10,000; Format: 32MS/32WS/32MD/32WD/32XD	Score:	
11 January	Estonian International (cancelled): Host: Tallinn, Estonia; Venue: Kalev Sports Hall; Level: International Series; Prize: $10,000; Format: 32MS/32WS/32MD/32WD/32XD	Score:	
11 January	Estonian International (cancelled): Host: Tallinn, Estonia; Venue: Kalev Sports Hall; Level: International Series; Prize: $10,000; Format: 32MS/32WS/32MD/32WD/32XD	Score:	
11 January	Estonian International (cancelled): Host: Tallinn, Estonia; Venue: Kalev Sports Hall; Level: International Series; Prize: $10,000; Format: 32MS/32WS/32MD/32WD/32XD	Score:	
11 January	Estonian International (cancelled): Host: Tallinn, Estonia; Venue: Kalev Sports Hall; Level: International Series; Prize: $10,000; Format: 32MS/32WS/32MD/32WD/32XD	Score:	
18 January	Swedish Open (cancelled): Host: Lund, Sweden; Venue: IFU Arena; Level: International Series; Prize: $10,000; Format: 32MS/32WS/32MD/32WD/32XD		
18 January	Swedish Open (cancelled): Host: Lund, Sweden; Venue: IFU Arena; Level: International Series; Prize: $10,000; Format: 32MS/32WS/32MD/32WD/32XD	Score:	
18 January	Swedish Open (cancelled): Host: Lund, Sweden; Venue: IFU Arena; Level: International Series; Prize: $10,000; Format: 32MS/32WS/32MD/32WD/32XD	Score:	
18 January	Swedish Open (cancelled): Host: Lund, Sweden; Venue: IFU Arena; Level: International Series; Prize: $10,000; Format: 32MS/32WS/32MD/32WD/32XD	Score:	
18 January	Swedish Open (cancelled): Host: Lund, Sweden; Venue: IFU Arena; Level: International Series; Prize: $10,000; Format: 32MS/32WS/32MD/32WD/32XD	Score:	
18 January	Swedish Open (cancelled): Host: Lund, Sweden; Venue: IFU Arena; Level: International Series; Prize: $10,000; Format: 32MS/32WS/32MD/32WD/32XD	Score:	
25 January	Iceland International (cancelled) (Note: Tournament cancelled due to the COVID-19 pandemic on 18 December 2020.): Host: Reykjavík, Iceland; Venue: Tennis- og Badmintonfélag Reykjavíkur; Level: Future Series; Format: 32MS/32WS/32MD/8WD/32XD		
25 January	Iceland International (cancelled): Host: Reykjavík, Iceland; Venue: Tennis- og Badmintonfélag Reykjavíkur; Level: Future Series; Format: 32MS/32WS/32MD/8WD/32XD	Score:	
25 January	Iceland International (cancelled): Host: Reykjavík, Iceland; Venue: Tennis- og Badmintonfélag Reykjavíkur; Level: Future Series; Format: 32MS/32WS/32MD/8WD/32XD	Score:	
25 January	Iceland International (cancelled): Host: Reykjavík, Iceland; Venue: Tennis- og Badmintonfélag Reykjavíkur; Level: Future Series; Format: 32MS/32WS/32MD/8WD/32XD	Score:	
25 January	Iceland International (cancelled): Host: Reykjavík, Iceland; Venue: Tennis- og Badmintonfélag Reykjavíkur; Level: Future Series; Format: 32MS/32WS/32MD/8WD/32XD	Score:	
25 January	Iceland International (cancelled): Host: Reykjavík, Iceland; Venue: Tennis- og Badmintonfélag Reykjavíkur; Level: Future Series; Format: 32MS/32WS/32MD/8WD/32XD	Score:	

=== February ===
Week commencing	Tournament	Champions	Runners-up
1 February	Iran Fajr International (cancelled) (Note: Tournament cancelled due to the COVID-19 pandemic on 8 December 2020.): Host: Shiraz, Iran; Venue: Shahid Dastgheib Sport Complex; Level: International Challenge; Prize: $25,000; Format: 64MS/32WS/16MD/16WD		
1 February	Iran Fajr International (cancelled): Host: Shiraz, Iran; Venue: Shahid Dastgheib Sport Complex; Level: International Challenge; Prize: $25,000; Format: 64MS/32WS/16MD/16WD	Score:	
1 February	Iran Fajr International (cancelled): Host: Shiraz, Iran; Venue: Shahid Dastgheib Sport Complex; Level: International Challenge; Prize: $25,000; Format: 64MS/32WS/16MD/16WD	Score:	
1 February	Iran Fajr International (cancelled): Host: Shiraz, Iran; Venue: Shahid Dastgheib Sport Complex; Level: International Challenge; Prize: $25,000; Format: 64MS/32WS/16MD/16WD	Score:	
1 February	Iran Fajr International (cancelled): Host: Shiraz, Iran; Venue: Shahid Dastgheib Sport Complex; Level: International Challenge; Prize: $25,000; Format: 64MS/32WS/16MD/16WD	Score:	
8 February	Canadian International (cancelled) (Note: Tournament cancelled due to the COVID-19 pandemic on 18 December 2020.): Host: Fort McMurray, Canada; Venue: MacDonald Island Park; Level: International Challenge; Prize: $25,000; Format: 32MS/24WS/16MD/16WD/16XD		
8 February	Canadian International (cancelled): Host: Fort McMurray, Canada; Venue: MacDonald Island Park; Level: International Challenge; Prize: $25,000; Format: 32MS/24WS/16MD/16WD/16XD	Score:	
8 February	Canadian International (cancelled): Host: Fort McMurray, Canada; Venue: MacDonald Island Park; Level: International Challenge; Prize: $25,000; Format: 32MS/24WS/16MD/16WD/16XD	Score:	
8 February	Canadian International (cancelled): Host: Fort McMurray, Canada; Venue: MacDonald Island Park; Level: International Challenge; Prize: $25,000; Format: 32MS/24WS/16MD/16WD/16XD	Score:	
8 February	Canadian International (cancelled): Host: Fort McMurray, Canada; Venue: MacDonald Island Park; Level: International Challenge; Prize: $25,000; Format: 32MS/24WS/16MD/16WD/16XD	Score:	
8 February	Canadian International (cancelled): Host: Fort McMurray, Canada; Venue: MacDonald Island Park; Level: International Challenge; Prize: $25,000; Format: 32MS/24WS/16MD/16WD/16XD	Score:	
15 February	European Mixed Team Badminton Championships (Draw): Host: Vantaa, Finland; Venue: Vantaan Energia Areena; Level: Continental Team Championships; Format: 8 teams (Round robin)	Denmark	France
15 February	European Mixed Team Badminton Championships (Draw): Host: Vantaa, Finland; Venue: Vantaan Energia Areena; Level: Continental Team Championships; Format: 8 teams (Round robin)	Viktor Axelsen	Christo Popov
15 February	European Mixed Team Badminton Championships (Draw): Host: Vantaa, Finland; Venue: Vantaan Energia Areena; Level: Continental Team Championships; Format: 8 teams (Round robin)	Mia Blichfeldt	Qi Xuefei
15 February	European Mixed Team Badminton Championships (Draw): Host: Vantaa, Finland; Venue: Vantaan Energia Areena; Level: Continental Team Championships; Format: 8 teams (Round robin)	Kim Astrup; Anders Skaarup Rasmussen	Ronan Labar; Julien Maio
15 February	European Mixed Team Badminton Championships (Draw): Host: Vantaa, Finland; Venue: Vantaan Energia Areena; Level: Continental Team Championships; Format: 8 teams (Round robin)	Maiken Fruergaard; Amalie Magelund	Léa Palermo; Anne Tran
15 February	European Mixed Team Badminton Championships (Draw): Host: Vantaa, Finland; Venue: Vantaan Energia Areena; Level: Continental Team Championships; Format: 8 teams (Round robin)	Mathias Christiansen; Alexandra Bøje	Thom Gicquel; Delphine Delrue
15 February	European Mixed Team Badminton Championships (Draw): Host: Vantaa, Finland; Venue: Vantaan Energia Areena; Level: Continental Team Championships; Format: 8 teams (Round robin)	Score: 3–0	
15 February	Pan Am Mixed Team Badminton Championships (Draw) (cancelled): Host: Fort McMurray, Canada; Venue: Suncor Community Leisure Centre; Level: Continental Team Championships; Format:		
15 February	Pan Am Mixed Team Badminton Championships (Draw) (cancelled): Host: Fort McMurray, Canada; Venue: Suncor Community Leisure Centre; Level: Continental Team Championships; Format:	Score:	
15 February	Oceania Mixed Team Badminton Championships (Draw) (cancelled): Host: Auckland, New Zealand; Venue: Badminton North Harbour Centre; Level: Continental Team Championships; Format: TBD Teams (Round robin)		
15 February	Oceania Mixed Team Badminton Championships (Draw) (cancelled): Host: Auckland, New Zealand; Venue: Badminton North Harbour Centre; Level: Continental Team Championships; Format: TBD Teams (Round robin)	Score:	
15 February	Oceania Badminton Championships (Draw) (cancelled): Host: Auckland, New Zealand; Venue: Badminton North Harbour Centre; Level: Continental Championships (International Challenge); Format: 64MS/32WS/32MD/32WD/32XD		
15 February	Oceania Badminton Championships (Draw) (cancelled): Host: Auckland, New Zealand; Venue: Badminton North Harbour Centre; Level: Continental Championships (International Challenge); Format: 64MS/32WS/32MD/32WD/32XD	Score:	
15 February	Oceania Badminton Championships (Draw) (cancelled): Host: Auckland, New Zealand; Venue: Badminton North Harbour Centre; Level: Continental Championships (International Challenge); Format: 64MS/32WS/32MD/32WD/32XD	Score:	
15 February	Oceania Badminton Championships (Draw) (cancelled): Host: Auckland, New Zealand; Venue: Badminton North Harbour Centre; Level: Continental Championships (International Challenge); Format: 64MS/32WS/32MD/32WD/32XD	Score:	
15 February	Oceania Badminton Championships (Draw) (cancelled): Host: Auckland, New Zealand; Venue: Badminton North Harbour Centre; Level: Continental Championships (International Challenge); Format: 64MS/32WS/32MD/32WD/32XD	Score:	
15 February	Oceania Badminton Championships (Draw) (cancelled): Host: Auckland, New Zealand; Venue: Badminton North Harbour Centre; Level: Continental Championships (International Challenge); Format: 64MS/32WS/32MD/32WD/32XD	Score:	
22 February	Austrian Open (cancelled) (Note: Tournament cancelled due to the COVID-19 pandemic on 7 January 2021.): Host: Graz, Austria; Venue: Raiffeisen Sportpark; Level: International Challenge; Prize: $25,000; Format: 32MS/32WS/32MD/32WD/32XD		
22 February	Austrian Open (cancelled): Host: Graz, Austria; Venue: Raiffeisen Sportpark; Level: International Challenge; Prize: $25,000; Format: 32MS/32WS/32MD/32WD/32XD	Score:	
22 February	Austrian Open (cancelled): Host: Graz, Austria; Venue: Raiffeisen Sportpark; Level: International Challenge; Prize: $25,000; Format: 32MS/32WS/32MD/32WD/32XD	Score:	
22 February	Austrian Open (cancelled): Host: Graz, Austria; Venue: Raiffeisen Sportpark; Level: International Challenge; Prize: $25,000; Format: 32MS/32WS/32MD/32WD/32XD	Score:	
22 February	Austrian Open (cancelled): Host: Graz, Austria; Venue: Raiffeisen Sportpark; Level: International Challenge; Prize: $25,000; Format: 32MS/32WS/32MD/32WD/32XD	Score:	
22 February	Austrian Open (cancelled): Host: Graz, Austria; Venue: Raiffeisen Sportpark; Level: International Challenge; Prize: $25,000; Format: 32MS/32WS/32MD/32WD/32XD	Score:	
22 February	Uganda International: Host: Kampala, Uganda; Venue: MTN Arena; Level: International Series; Prize: $10,000; Format: 32MS/32WS/16WD/32XD	(India) Varun Kapur	(India) Sankar Subramanian
22 February	Uganda International: Host: Kampala, Uganda; Venue: MTN Arena; Level: International Series; Prize: $10,000; Format: 32MS/32WS/16WD/32XD	Score: 21–18, 16–21, 21–17	
22 February	Uganda International: Host: Kampala, Uganda; Venue: MTN Arena; Level: International Series; Prize: $10,000; Format: 32MS/32WS/16WD/32XD	(India) Malvika Bansod	(India) Anupama Upadhyaya
22 February	Uganda International: Host: Kampala, Uganda; Venue: MTN Arena; Level: International Series; Prize: $10,000; Format: 32MS/32WS/16WD/32XD	Score: 17–21, 25–23, 21–10	
22 February	Uganda International: Host: Kampala, Uganda; Venue: MTN Arena; Level: International Series; Prize: $10,000; Format: 32MS/32WS/16WD/32XD	(Uganda) Husina Kobugabe (Uganda) Mable Namakoye	(Uganda) Fadilah Mohamed Rafi (Uganda) Tracy Naluwooza
22 February	Uganda International: Host: Kampala, Uganda; Venue: MTN Arena; Level: International Series; Prize: $10,000; Format: 32MS/32WS/16WD/32XD	Score: 21–9, 21–17	
22 February	Uganda International: Host: Kampala, Uganda; Venue: MTN Arena; Level: International Series; Prize: $10,000; Format: 32MS/32WS/16WD/32XD	(Uganda) Israel Wanagalya (Uganda) Betty Apio	(Uganda) Brian Kasirye (Uganda) Husina Kobugabe
22 February	Uganda International: Host: Kampala, Uganda; Venue: MTN Arena; Level: International Series; Prize: $10,000; Format: 32MS/32WS/16WD/32XD	Score: 21–13, 22–20	

=== March ===
Week commencing	Tournament	Champions	Runners-up
1 March	Swiss Open (Draw): Host: Basel, Switzerland; Venue: St. Jakobshalle; Level: Super 300; Prize: $140,000; Format: 32MS/32WS/32MD/32WD/32XD	(Denmark) Viktor Axelsen	(Thailand) Kunlavut Vitidsarn
1 March	Swiss Open (Draw): Host: Basel, Switzerland; Venue: St. Jakobshalle; Level: Super 300; Prize: $140,000; Format: 32MS/32WS/32MD/32WD/32XD	Score: 21–16, 21–6	
1 March	Swiss Open (Draw): Host: Basel, Switzerland; Venue: St. Jakobshalle; Level: Super 300; Prize: $140,000; Format: 32MS/32WS/32MD/32WD/32XD	(Spain) Carolina Marín	(India) P. V. Sindhu
1 March	Swiss Open (Draw): Host: Basel, Switzerland; Venue: St. Jakobshalle; Level: Super 300; Prize: $140,000; Format: 32MS/32WS/32MD/32WD/32XD	Score: 21–12, 21–5	
1 March	Swiss Open (Draw): Host: Basel, Switzerland; Venue: St. Jakobshalle; Level: Super 300; Prize: $140,000; Format: 32MS/32WS/32MD/32WD/32XD	(Denmark) Kim Astrup (Denmark) Anders Skaarup Rasmussen	(Germany) Mark Lamsfuß (Germany) Marvin Seidel
1 March	Swiss Open (Draw): Host: Basel, Switzerland; Venue: St. Jakobshalle; Level: Super 300; Prize: $140,000; Format: 32MS/32WS/32MD/32WD/32XD	Score: 21–16, 21–11	
1 March	Swiss Open (Draw): Host: Basel, Switzerland; Venue: St. Jakobshalle; Level: Super 300; Prize: $140,000; Format: 32MS/32WS/32MD/32WD/32XD	(Malaysia) Pearly Tan (Malaysia) Thinaah Muralitharan	(Bulgaria) Gabriela Stoeva (Bulgaria) Stefani Stoeva
1 March	Swiss Open (Draw): Host: Basel, Switzerland; Venue: St. Jakobshalle; Level: Super 300; Prize: $140,000; Format: 32MS/32WS/32MD/32WD/32XD	Score: 21–19, 21–12	
1 March	Swiss Open (Draw): Host: Basel, Switzerland; Venue: St. Jakobshalle; Level: Super 300; Prize: $140,000; Format: 32MS/32WS/32MD/32WD/32XD	(France) Thom Gicquel (France) Delphine Delrue	(Denmark) Mathias Christiansen (Denmark) Alexandra Bøje
1 March	Swiss Open (Draw): Host: Basel, Switzerland; Venue: St. Jakobshalle; Level: Super 300; Prize: $140,000; Format: 32MS/32WS/32MD/32WD/32XD	Score: 21–19, 21–19	
1 March	Slovak Open (cancelled) (Note: Tournament cancelled due to the COVID-19 pandemic on 22 January 2021.): Host: Trenčín, Slovakia; Venue: Športové centrum M-Šport; Level: Future Series; Format: 32MS/32WS/32MD/32WD/32XD		
1 March	Slovak Open (cancelled): Host: Trenčín, Slovakia; Venue: Športové centrum M-Šport; Level: Future Series; Format: 32MS/32WS/32MD/32WD/32XD	Score:	
1 March	Slovak Open (cancelled): Host: Trenčín, Slovakia; Venue: Športové centrum M-Šport; Level: Future Series; Format: 32MS/32WS/32MD/32WD/32XD	Score:	
1 March	Slovak Open (cancelled): Host: Trenčín, Slovakia; Venue: Športové centrum M-Šport; Level: Future Series; Format: 32MS/32WS/32MD/32WD/32XD	Score:	
1 March	Slovak Open (cancelled): Host: Trenčín, Slovakia; Venue: Športové centrum M-Šport; Level: Future Series; Format: 32MS/32WS/32MD/32WD/32XD	Score:	
1 March	Slovak Open (cancelled): Host: Trenčín, Slovakia; Venue: Športové centrum M-Šport; Level: Future Series; Format: 32MS/32WS/32MD/32WD/32XD	Score:	
1 March	Kenya International (cancelled) (Note: Tournament cancelled due to the COVID-19 pandemic on 14 January 2021.): Host: Nairobi, Kenya; Venue: TBA; Level: Future Series; Format: 32MS/32WS/32MD/32WD/32XD		
1 March	Kenya International (cancelled): Host: Nairobi, Kenya; Venue: TBA; Level: Future Series; Format: 32MS/32WS/32MD/32WD/32XD	Score:	
1 March	Kenya International (cancelled): Host: Nairobi, Kenya; Venue: TBA; Level: Future Series; Format: 32MS/32WS/32MD/32WD/32XD	Score:	
1 March	Kenya International (cancelled): Host: Nairobi, Kenya; Venue: TBA; Level: Future Series; Format: 32MS/32WS/32MD/32WD/32XD	Score:	
1 March	Kenya International (cancelled): Host: Nairobi, Kenya; Venue: TBA; Level: Future Series; Format: 32MS/32WS/32MD/32WD/32XD	Score:	
1 March	Kenya International (cancelled): Host: Nairobi, Kenya; Venue: TBA; Level: Future Series; Format: 32MS/32WS/32MD/32WD/32XD	Score:	
8 March	German Open (Draw) (cancelled) (Note: This tournament, originally to be played on said dates, was later cancelled due to the COVID-19 pandemic in Germany.): Host: Mülheim, Germany; Venue: Innogy Sporthalle; Level: Super 300; Prize: $140,000; Format: 32MS/32WS/32MD/32WD/32XD		
8 March	German Open (Draw) (cancelled): Host: Mülheim, Germany; Venue: Innogy Sporthalle; Level: Super 300; Prize: $140,000; Format: 32MS/32WS/32MD/32WD/32XD	Score:	
8 March	German Open (Draw) (cancelled): Host: Mülheim, Germany; Venue: Innogy Sporthalle; Level: Super 300; Prize: $140,000; Format: 32MS/32WS/32MD/32WD/32XD	Score:	
8 March	German Open (Draw) (cancelled): Host: Mülheim, Germany; Venue: Innogy Sporthalle; Level: Super 300; Prize: $140,000; Format: 32MS/32WS/32MD/32WD/32XD	Score:	
8 March	German Open (Draw) (cancelled): Host: Mülheim, Germany; Venue: Innogy Sporthalle; Level: Super 300; Prize: $140,000; Format: 32MS/32WS/32MD/32WD/32XD	Score:	
8 March	German Open (Draw) (cancelled): Host: Mülheim, Germany; Venue: Innogy Sporthalle; Level: Super 300; Prize: $140,000; Format: 32MS/32WS/32MD/32WD/32XD	Score:	
15 March	All England Open (Draw): Host: Birmingham, England; Venue: Utilita Arena Birmingham; Level: Super 1000; Prize: $850,000; Format: 32MS/32WS/32MD/32WD/32XD	(Malaysia) Lee Zii Jia	(Denmark) Viktor Axelsen
15 March	All England Open (Draw): Host: Birmingham, England; Venue: Utilita Arena Birmingham; Level: Super 1000; Prize: $850,000; Format: 32MS/32WS/32MD/32WD/32XD	Score: 30–29, 20–22, 21–9	
15 March	All England Open (Draw): Host: Birmingham, England; Venue: Utilita Arena Birmingham; Level: Super 1000; Prize: $850,000; Format: 32MS/32WS/32MD/32WD/32XD	(Japan) Nozomi Okuhara	(Thailand) Pornpawee Chochuwong
15 March	All England Open (Draw): Host: Birmingham, England; Venue: Utilita Arena Birmingham; Level: Super 1000; Prize: $850,000; Format: 32MS/32WS/32MD/32WD/32XD	Score: 21–12, 21–16	
15 March	All England Open (Draw): Host: Birmingham, England; Venue: Utilita Arena Birmingham; Level: Super 1000; Prize: $850,000; Format: 32MS/32WS/32MD/32WD/32XD	(Japan) Hiroyuki Endo (Japan) Yuta Watanabe	(Japan) Takeshi Kamura (Japan) Keigo Sonoda
15 March	All England Open (Draw): Host: Birmingham, England; Venue: Utilita Arena Birmingham; Level: Super 1000; Prize: $850,000; Format: 32MS/32WS/32MD/32WD/32XD	Score: 21–15, 17–21, 21–11	
15 March	All England Open (Draw): Host: Birmingham, England; Venue: Utilita Arena Birmingham; Level: Super 1000; Prize: $850,000; Format: 32MS/32WS/32MD/32WD/32XD	(Japan) Mayu Matsumoto (Japan) Wakana Nagahara	(Japan) Yuki Fukushima (Japan) Sayaka Hirota
15 March	All England Open (Draw): Host: Birmingham, England; Venue: Utilita Arena Birmingham; Level: Super 1000; Prize: $850,000; Format: 32MS/32WS/32MD/32WD/32XD	Score: 21–18, 21–16	
15 March	All England Open (Draw): Host: Birmingham, England; Venue: Utilita Arena Birmingham; Level: Super 1000; Prize: $850,000; Format: 32MS/32WS/32MD/32WD/32XD	(Japan) Yuta Watanabe (Japan) Arisa Higashino	(Japan) Yuki Kaneko (Japan) Misaki Matsutomo
15 March	All England Open (Draw): Host: Birmingham, England; Venue: Utilita Arena Birmingham; Level: Super 1000; Prize: $850,000; Format: 32MS/32WS/32MD/32WD/32XD	Score: 21–14, 21–13	
15 March	Maldives International (cancelled) (Note: Tournament cancelled due to the COVID-19 pandemic on 18 December 2020.): Host: Malé, Maldives; Venue: Male' Kulhivaru Ekuveni; Level: International Challenge; Prize: $25,000; Format: TBD		
15 March	Maldives International (cancelled): Host: Malé, Maldives; Venue: Male' Kulhivaru Ekuveni; Level: International Challenge; Prize: $25,000; Format: TBD	Score:	
15 March	Maldives International (cancelled): Host: Malé, Maldives; Venue: Male' Kulhivaru Ekuveni; Level: International Challenge; Prize: $25,000; Format: TBD	Score:	
15 March	Maldives International (cancelled): Host: Malé, Maldives; Venue: Male' Kulhivaru Ekuveni; Level: International Challenge; Prize: $25,000; Format: TBD	Score:	
15 March	Maldives International (cancelled): Host: Malé, Maldives; Venue: Male' Kulhivaru Ekuveni; Level: International Challenge; Prize: $25,000; Format: TBD	Score:	
15 March	Maldives International (cancelled): Host: Malé, Maldives; Venue: Male' Kulhivaru Ekuveni; Level: International Challenge; Prize: $25,000; Format: TBD	Score:	
15 March	Giraldilla International (cancelled): Host: Havana, Cuba; Venue: Coliseo de la Ciudad Deportiva; Level: Future Series; Format: 32MS/16WS/8MD/8WD/16XD		
15 March	Giraldilla International (cancelled): Host: Havana, Cuba; Venue: Coliseo de la Ciudad Deportiva; Level: Future Series; Format: 32MS/16WS/8MD/8WD/16XD	Score:	
15 March	Giraldilla International (cancelled): Host: Havana, Cuba; Venue: Coliseo de la Ciudad Deportiva; Level: Future Series; Format: 32MS/16WS/8MD/8WD/16XD	Score:	
15 March	Giraldilla International (cancelled): Host: Havana, Cuba; Venue: Coliseo de la Ciudad Deportiva; Level: Future Series; Format: 32MS/16WS/8MD/8WD/16XD	Score:	
15 March	Giraldilla International (cancelled): Host: Havana, Cuba; Venue: Coliseo de la Ciudad Deportiva; Level: Future Series; Format: 32MS/16WS/8MD/8WD/16XD	Score:	
15 March	Giraldilla International (cancelled): Host: Havana, Cuba; Venue: Coliseo de la Ciudad Deportiva; Level: Future Series; Format: 32MS/16WS/8MD/8WD/16XD	Score:	
22 March	Lingshui China Masters (Draw) (cancelled) (Note: Tournament cancelled due to the COVID-19 pandemic.): Host: Lingshui, China; Venue: Agile Stadium of Lingshui Culture and Sports Square; Level: Super 100; Prize: $100,000; Format: 48MS/32WS/32MD/32WD/32XD		
22 March	Lingshui China Masters (Draw) (cancelled): Host: Lingshui, China; Venue: Agile Stadium of Lingshui Culture and Sports Square; Level: Super 100; Prize: $100,000; Format: 48MS/32WS/32MD/32WD/32XD	Score:	
22 March	Lingshui China Masters (Draw) (cancelled): Host: Lingshui, China; Venue: Agile Stadium of Lingshui Culture and Sports Square; Level: Super 100; Prize: $100,000; Format: 48MS/32WS/32MD/32WD/32XD	Score:	
22 March	Lingshui China Masters (Draw) (cancelled): Host: Lingshui, China; Venue: Agile Stadium of Lingshui Culture and Sports Square; Level: Super 100; Prize: $100,000; Format: 48MS/32WS/32MD/32WD/32XD	Score:	
22 March	Lingshui China Masters (Draw) (cancelled): Host: Lingshui, China; Venue: Agile Stadium of Lingshui Culture and Sports Square; Level: Super 100; Prize: $100,000; Format: 48MS/32WS/32MD/32WD/32XD	Score:	
22 March	Lingshui China Masters (Draw) (cancelled): Host: Lingshui, China; Venue: Agile Stadium of Lingshui Culture and Sports Square; Level: Super 100; Prize: $100,000; Format: 48MS/32WS/32MD/32WD/32XD	Score:	
22 March	Orléans Masters (Draw): Host: Orléans, France; Venue: Palais des Sports; Level: Super 100; Prize: $75,000; Format: 64MS/32WS/32MD/32WD/32XD	(France) Toma Junior Popov	(Denmark) Mads Christophersen
22 March	Orléans Masters (Draw): Host: Orléans, France; Venue: Palais des Sports; Level: Super 100; Prize: $75,000; Format: 64MS/32WS/32MD/32WD/32XD	Score: 23–21, 21–13	
22 March	Orléans Masters (Draw): Host: Orléans, France; Venue: Palais des Sports; Level: Super 100; Prize: $75,000; Format: 64MS/32WS/32MD/32WD/32XD	(Thailand) Busanan Ongbamrungphan	(Denmark) Line Christophersen
22 March	Orléans Masters (Draw): Host: Orléans, France; Venue: Palais des Sports; Level: Super 100; Prize: $75,000; Format: 64MS/32WS/32MD/32WD/32XD	Score: 16–21, 21–15, 21–19	
22 March	Orléans Masters (Draw): Host: Orléans, France; Venue: Palais des Sports; Level: Super 100; Prize: $75,000; Format: 64MS/32WS/32MD/32WD/32XD	(England) Ben Lane (England) Sean Vendy	(India) Krishna Prasad Garaga (India) Vishnu Vardhan Goud Panjala
22 March	Orléans Masters (Draw): Host: Orléans, France; Venue: Palais des Sports; Level: Super 100; Prize: $75,000; Format: 64MS/32WS/32MD/32WD/32XD	Score: 19–21, 21–14, 21–19	
22 March	Orléans Masters (Draw): Host: Orléans, France; Venue: Palais des Sports; Level: Super 100; Prize: $75,000; Format: 64MS/32WS/32MD/32WD/32XD	(Thailand) Jongkolphan Kititharakul (Thailand) Rawinda Prajongjai	(Bulgaria) Gabriela Stoeva (Bulgaria) Stefani Stoeva
22 March	Orléans Masters (Draw): Host: Orléans, France; Venue: Palais des Sports; Level: Super 100; Prize: $75,000; Format: 64MS/32WS/32MD/32WD/32XD	Score: 21–16, 21–16	
22 March	Orléans Masters (Draw): Host: Orléans, France; Venue: Palais des Sports; Level: Super 100; Prize: $75,000; Format: 64MS/32WS/32MD/32WD/32XD	(Denmark) Mathias Christiansen (Denmark) Alexandra Bøje	(Denmark) Niclas Nøhr (Denmark) Amalie Magelund
22 March	Orléans Masters (Draw): Host: Orléans, France; Venue: Palais des Sports; Level: Super 100; Prize: $75,000; Format: 64MS/32WS/32MD/32WD/32XD	Score: 21–13, 21–17	
22 March	Polish Open: Host: Gniezno, Poland; Venue: Hala widowiskowo-sportowa; Level: International Challenge; Prize: $15,000; Format: 32MS/32WS/32MD/32WD/32XD	(Malaysia) Ng Tze Yong	(Spain) Pablo Abián
22 March	Polish Open: Host: Gniezno, Poland; Venue: Hala widowiskowo-sportowa; Level: International Challenge; Prize: $15,000; Format: 32MS/32WS/32MD/32WD/32XD	Score: 21–19, 21–11	
22 March	Polish Open: Host: Gniezno, Poland; Venue: Hala widowiskowo-sportowa; Level: International Challenge; Prize: $15,000; Format: 32MS/32WS/32MD/32WD/32XD	(Estonia) Kristin Kuuba	(India) Tanya Hemanth
22 March	Polish Open: Host: Gniezno, Poland; Venue: Hala widowiskowo-sportowa; Level: International Challenge; Prize: $15,000; Format: 32MS/32WS/32MD/32WD/32XD	Score: 24–22, 21–14	
22 March	Polish Open: Host: Gniezno, Poland; Venue: Hala widowiskowo-sportowa; Level: International Challenge; Prize: $15,000; Format: 32MS/32WS/32MD/32WD/32XD	(Malaysia) Man Wei Chong (Malaysia) Tee Kai Wun	(Malaysia) Chang Yee Jun (Malaysia) Chia Weijie
22 March	Polish Open: Host: Gniezno, Poland; Venue: Hala widowiskowo-sportowa; Level: International Challenge; Prize: $15,000; Format: 32MS/32WS/32MD/32WD/32XD	Score: 21–17, 20–22, 21–19	
22 March	Polish Open: Host: Gniezno, Poland; Venue: Hala widowiskowo-sportowa; Level: International Challenge; Prize: $15,000; Format: 32MS/32WS/32MD/32WD/32XD	(Turkey) Bengisu Erçetin (Turkey) Nazlıcan İnci	(Poland) Zuzanna Jankowska (Poland) Anastasia Khomich
22 March	Polish Open: Host: Gniezno, Poland; Venue: Hala widowiskowo-sportowa; Level: International Challenge; Prize: $15,000; Format: 32MS/32WS/32MD/32WD/32XD	Score: 21–11, 21–12	
22 March	Polish Open: Host: Gniezno, Poland; Venue: Hala widowiskowo-sportowa; Level: International Challenge; Prize: $15,000; Format: 32MS/32WS/32MD/32WD/32XD	(Malaysia) Choong Hon Jian (Malaysia) Toh Ee Wei	(Switzerland) Nicolas A. Müller (Switzerland) Ronja Stern
22 March	Polish Open: Host: Gniezno, Poland; Venue: Hala widowiskowo-sportowa; Level: International Challenge; Prize: $15,000; Format: 32MS/32WS/32MD/32WD/32XD	Score: 21–16, 21–12	
22 March	Santo Domingo Open: Host: Santo Domingo, Dominican Republic; Venue: Pabellon de Tenis de Mesa; Level: International Series; Prize: $5,000; Format: 16MS/16WS/8MD/8WD/16XD	(Guatemala) Rubén Castellanos	(Mexico) Luis Montoya
22 March	Santo Domingo Open: Host: Santo Domingo, Dominican Republic; Venue: Pabellon de Tenis de Mesa; Level: International Series; Prize: $5,000; Format: 16MS/16WS/8MD/8WD/16XD	Score: 19–21, 21–19, 21–13	
22 March	Santo Domingo Open: Host: Santo Domingo, Dominican Republic; Venue: Pabellon de Tenis de Mesa; Level: International Series; Prize: $5,000; Format: 16MS/16WS/8MD/8WD/16XD	(Guatemala) Nikté Sotomayor	(Mexico) Sabrina Solis
22 March	Santo Domingo Open: Host: Santo Domingo, Dominican Republic; Venue: Pabellon de Tenis de Mesa; Level: International Series; Prize: $5,000; Format: 16MS/16WS/8MD/8WD/16XD	Score: 21–17, 21–18	
22 March	Santo Domingo Open: Host: Santo Domingo, Dominican Republic; Venue: Pabellon de Tenis de Mesa; Level: International Series; Prize: $5,000; Format: 16MS/16WS/8MD/8WD/16XD	(Guatemala) Aníbal Marroquín (Guatemala) Jonathan Solís	(Guatemala) Rubén Castellanos (Guatemala) Christopher Martínez
22 March	Santo Domingo Open: Host: Santo Domingo, Dominican Republic; Venue: Pabellon de Tenis de Mesa; Level: International Series; Prize: $5,000; Format: 16MS/16WS/8MD/8WD/16XD	Score: 21–10, 21–19	
22 March	Santo Domingo Open: Host: Santo Domingo, Dominican Republic; Venue: Pabellon de Tenis de Mesa; Level: International Series; Prize: $5,000; Format: 16MS/16WS/8MD/8WD/16XD	(Guatemala) Diana Corleto (Guatemala) Nikté Sotomayor	(Guatemala) Alejandra Paiz (Guatemala) Mariana Paiz
22 March	Santo Domingo Open: Host: Santo Domingo, Dominican Republic; Venue: Pabellon de Tenis de Mesa; Level: International Series; Prize: $5,000; Format: 16MS/16WS/8MD/8WD/16XD	Score: 21–11, 21–14	
22 March	Santo Domingo Open: Host: Santo Domingo, Dominican Republic; Venue: Pabellon de Tenis de Mesa; Level: International Series; Prize: $5,000; Format: 16MS/16WS/8MD/8WD/16XD	(Mexico) Luis Montoya (Mexico) Vanessa Villalobos	(Guatemala) Jonathan Solís (Guatemala) Diana Corleto
22 March	Santo Domingo Open: Host: Santo Domingo, Dominican Republic; Venue: Pabellon de Tenis de Mesa; Level: International Series; Prize: $5,000; Format: 16MS/16WS/8MD/8WD/16XD	Score: 21–17, 21–17	
29 March	Osaka International (cancelled) (Note: Tournament cancelled due to the COVID-19 pandemic on 2 February 2021.): Host: Moriguchi, Osaka, Japan; Venue: Moriguchi City Gymnasium; Level: International Challenge; Prize: $25,000; Format: 32MS/32WS/32MD/32WD/32XD		
29 March	Osaka International (cancelled): Host: Moriguchi, Osaka, Japan; Venue: Moriguchi City Gymnasium; Level: International Challenge; Prize: $25,000; Format: 32MS/32WS/32MD/32WD/32XD	Score:	
29 March	Osaka International (cancelled): Host: Moriguchi, Osaka, Japan; Venue: Moriguchi City Gymnasium; Level: International Challenge; Prize: $25,000; Format: 32MS/32WS/32MD/32WD/32XD	Score:	
29 March	Osaka International (cancelled): Host: Moriguchi, Osaka, Japan; Venue: Moriguchi City Gymnasium; Level: International Challenge; Prize: $25,000; Format: 32MS/32WS/32MD/32WD/32XD	Score:	
29 March	Osaka International (cancelled): Host: Moriguchi, Osaka, Japan; Venue: Moriguchi City Gymnasium; Level: International Challenge; Prize: $25,000; Format: 32MS/32WS/32MD/32WD/32XD	Score:	
29 March	Osaka International (cancelled): Host: Moriguchi, Osaka, Japan; Venue: Moriguchi City Gymnasium; Level: International Challenge; Prize: $25,000; Format: 32MS/32WS/32MD/32WD/32XD	Score:	

=== April ===
Week commencing	Tournament	Champions	Runners-up
5 April	Malaysia Masters (Draw) (postponed): Host: Kuala Lumpur, Malaysia; Venue: Axiata Arena; Level: Super 500; Prize: $400,000; Format: 32MS/32WS/32MD/32WD/32XD		
5 April	Malaysia Masters (Draw) (postponed): Host: Kuala Lumpur, Malaysia; Venue: Axiata Arena; Level: Super 500; Prize: $400,000; Format: 32MS/32WS/32MD/32WD/32XD	Score:	
5 April	Malaysia Masters (Draw) (postponed): Host: Kuala Lumpur, Malaysia; Venue: Axiata Arena; Level: Super 500; Prize: $400,000; Format: 32MS/32WS/32MD/32WD/32XD	Score:	
5 April	Malaysia Masters (Draw) (postponed): Host: Kuala Lumpur, Malaysia; Venue: Axiata Arena; Level: Super 500; Prize: $400,000; Format: 32MS/32WS/32MD/32WD/32XD	Score:	
5 April	Malaysia Masters (Draw) (postponed): Host: Kuala Lumpur, Malaysia; Venue: Axiata Arena; Level: Super 500; Prize: $400,000; Format: 32MS/32WS/32MD/32WD/32XD	Score:	
5 April	Malaysia Masters (Draw) (postponed): Host: Kuala Lumpur, Malaysia; Venue: Axiata Arena; Level: Super 500; Prize: $400,000; Format: 32MS/32WS/32MD/32WD/32XD	Score:	
12 April	Dutch International (cancelled) (Note: Tournament cancelled due to the COVID-19 pandemic on 18 December 2020.): Host: Wateringen, Netherlands; Venue: VELO Hall; Level: International Series; Prize: $10,000; Format: TBD		
12 April	Dutch International (cancelled): Host: Wateringen, Netherlands; Venue: VELO Hall; Level: International Series; Prize: $10,000; Format: TBD	Score:	
12 April	Dutch International (cancelled): Host: Wateringen, Netherlands; Venue: VELO Hall; Level: International Series; Prize: $10,000; Format: TBD	Score:	
12 April	Dutch International (cancelled): Host: Wateringen, Netherlands; Venue: VELO Hall; Level: International Series; Prize: $10,000; Format: TBD	Score:	
12 April	Dutch International (cancelled): Host: Wateringen, Netherlands; Venue: VELO Hall; Level: International Series; Prize: $10,000; Format: TBD	Score:	
12 April	Dutch International (cancelled): Host: Wateringen, Netherlands; Venue: VELO Hall; Level: International Series; Prize: $10,000; Format: TBD	Score:	
19 April	Peru International: Host: Lima, Peru; Venue: Polideportivo 2 Car Videna; Level: International Series; Prize: $10,000; Format: 32MS/32WS/32MD/16WD/32XD	(Canada) Brian Yang	(Brazil) Ygor Coelho
19 April	Peru International: Host: Lima, Peru; Venue: Polideportivo 2 Car Videna; Level: International Series; Prize: $10,000; Format: 32MS/32WS/32MD/16WD/32XD	Score: 21–16, 21–18	
19 April	Peru International: Host: Lima, Peru; Venue: Polideportivo 2 Car Videna; Level: International Series; Prize: $10,000; Format: 32MS/32WS/32MD/16WD/32XD	(Hungary) Laura Sárosi	(Hungary) Daniella Gonda
19 April	Peru International: Host: Lima, Peru; Venue: Polideportivo 2 Car Videna; Level: International Series; Prize: $10,000; Format: 32MS/32WS/32MD/16WD/32XD	Score: 21–15, 21–12	
19 April	Peru International: Host: Lima, Peru; Venue: Polideportivo 2 Car Videna; Level: International Series; Prize: $10,000; Format: 32MS/32WS/32MD/16WD/32XD	(Algeria) Koceila Mammeri (Algeria) Youcef Sabri Medel	(Guatemala) Aníbal Marroquín (Guatemala) Jonathan Solís
19 April	Peru International: Host: Lima, Peru; Venue: Polideportivo 2 Car Videna; Level: International Series; Prize: $10,000; Format: 32MS/32WS/32MD/16WD/32XD	Score: 21–18, 21–15	
19 April	Peru International: Host: Lima, Peru; Venue: Polideportivo 2 Car Videna; Level: International Series; Prize: $10,000; Format: 32MS/32WS/32MD/16WD/32XD	(Guatemala) Diana Corleto (Guatemala) Nikté Sotomayor	(Guatemala) Alejandra Paiz (Guatemala) Mariana Paiz
19 April	Peru International: Host: Lima, Peru; Venue: Polideportivo 2 Car Videna; Level: International Series; Prize: $10,000; Format: 32MS/32WS/32MD/16WD/32XD	Score: 24–22, 21–7	
19 April	Peru International: Host: Lima, Peru; Venue: Polideportivo 2 Car Videna; Level: International Series; Prize: $10,000; Format: 32MS/32WS/32MD/16WD/32XD	(Guatemala) Jonathan Solís (Guatemala) Diana Corleto	(Mexico) Luis Montoya (Mexico) Vanessa Villalobos
19 April	Peru International: Host: Lima, Peru; Venue: Polideportivo 2 Car Videna; Level: International Series; Prize: $10,000; Format: 32MS/32WS/32MD/16WD/32XD	Score: 21–12, 21–7	
26 April	Badminton Asia Championships (Draw) (postponed): Host: TBC, China; Venue: TBC; Level: Continental Championships (Super 1000); Prize: $400,000; Format: 32MS/32WS/32MD/32WD/32XD		
26 April	Badminton Asia Championships (Draw) (postponed): Host: TBC, China; Venue: TBC; Level: Continental Championships (Super 1000); Prize: $400,000; Format: 32MS/32WS/32MD/32WD/32XD	Score:	
26 April	Badminton Asia Championships (Draw) (postponed): Host: TBC, China; Venue: TBC; Level: Continental Championships (Super 1000); Prize: $400,000; Format: 32MS/32WS/32MD/32WD/32XD	Score:	
26 April	Badminton Asia Championships (Draw) (postponed): Host: TBC, China; Venue: TBC; Level: Continental Championships (Super 1000); Prize: $400,000; Format: 32MS/32WS/32MD/32WD/32XD	Score:	
26 April	Badminton Asia Championships (Draw) (postponed): Host: TBC, China; Venue: TBC; Level: Continental Championships (Super 1000); Prize: $400,000; Format: 32MS/32WS/32MD/32WD/32XD	Score:	
26 April	Badminton Asia Championships (Draw) (postponed): Host: TBC, China; Venue: TBC; Level: Continental Championships (Super 1000); Prize: $400,000; Format: 32MS/32WS/32MD/32WD/32XD	Score:	
26 April	European Badminton Championships (Draw): Host: Kyiv, Ukraine; Venue: Palace of Sports; Level: Continental Championships (Super 500); Format: 40MS/40WS/28MD/28WD/28XD	(Denmark) Anders Antonsen	(Denmark) Viktor Axelsen
26 April	European Badminton Championships (Draw): Host: Kyiv, Ukraine; Venue: Palace of Sports; Level: Continental Championships (Super 500); Format: 40MS/40WS/28MD/28WD/28XD	Score: Walkover	
26 April	European Badminton Championships (Draw): Host: Kyiv, Ukraine; Venue: Palace of Sports; Level: Continental Championships (Super 500); Format: 40MS/40WS/28MD/28WD/28XD	(Spain) Carolina Marín	(Denmark) Line Christophersen
26 April	European Badminton Championships (Draw): Host: Kyiv, Ukraine; Venue: Palace of Sports; Level: Continental Championships (Super 500); Format: 40MS/40WS/28MD/28WD/28XD	Score: 21–13, 21–18	
26 April	European Badminton Championships (Draw): Host: Kyiv, Ukraine; Venue: Palace of Sports; Level: Continental Championships (Super 500); Format: 40MS/40WS/28MD/28WD/28XD	(Russia) Vladimir Ivanov (Russia) Ivan Sozonov	(Germany) Mark Lamsfuß (Germany) Marvin Seidel
26 April	European Badminton Championships (Draw): Host: Kyiv, Ukraine; Venue: Palace of Sports; Level: Continental Championships (Super 500); Format: 40MS/40WS/28MD/28WD/28XD	Score: Walkover	
26 April	European Badminton Championships (Draw): Host: Kyiv, Ukraine; Venue: Palace of Sports; Level: Continental Championships (Super 500); Format: 40MS/40WS/28MD/28WD/28XD	(Bulgaria) Gabriela Stoeva (Bulgaria) Stefani Stoeva	(England) Chloe Birch (England) Lauren Smith
26 April	European Badminton Championships (Draw): Host: Kyiv, Ukraine; Venue: Palace of Sports; Level: Continental Championships (Super 500); Format: 40MS/40WS/28MD/28WD/28XD	Score: 21–14, 21–19	
26 April	European Badminton Championships (Draw): Host: Kyiv, Ukraine; Venue: Palace of Sports; Level: Continental Championships (Super 500); Format: 40MS/40WS/28MD/28WD/28XD	(Russia) Rodion Alimov (Russia) Alina Davletova	(England) Marcus Ellis (England) Lauren Smith
26 April	European Badminton Championships (Draw): Host: Kyiv, Ukraine; Venue: Palace of Sports; Level: Continental Championships (Super 500); Format: 40MS/40WS/28MD/28WD/28XD	Score: 11–21, 21–16, 21–15	
26 April	Pan American Badminton Championships (Draw): Host: Guatemala City, Guatemala; Venue: Teodoro Palacios Flores; Level: Continental Championships (Super 300); Format: 64MS/32WS/16MD/16WD/32XD	(Canada) Brian Yang	(Canada) Jason Ho-Shue
26 April	Pan American Badminton Championships (Draw): Host: Guatemala City, Guatemala; Venue: Teodoro Palacios Flores; Level: Continental Championships (Super 300); Format: 64MS/32WS/16MD/16WD/32XD	Score: 21–13, 18–10 Retired	
26 April	Pan American Badminton Championships (Draw): Host: Guatemala City, Guatemala; Venue: Teodoro Palacios Flores; Level: Continental Championships (Super 300); Format: 64MS/32WS/16MD/16WD/32XD	(United States) Beiwen Zhang	(Canada) Rachel Chan
26 April	Pan American Badminton Championships (Draw): Host: Guatemala City, Guatemala; Venue: Teodoro Palacios Flores; Level: Continental Championships (Super 300); Format: 64MS/32WS/16MD/16WD/32XD	Score: 21–14, 21–18	
26 April	Pan American Badminton Championships (Draw): Host: Guatemala City, Guatemala; Venue: Teodoro Palacios Flores; Level: Continental Championships (Super 300); Format: 64MS/32WS/16MD/16WD/32XD	(United States) Phillip Chew (United States) Ryan Chew	(Canada) Jason Ho-Shue (Canada) Nyl Yakura
26 April	Pan American Badminton Championships (Draw): Host: Guatemala City, Guatemala; Venue: Teodoro Palacios Flores; Level: Continental Championships (Super 300); Format: 64MS/32WS/16MD/16WD/32XD	Score: Walkover	
26 April	Pan American Badminton Championships (Draw): Host: Guatemala City, Guatemala; Venue: Teodoro Palacios Flores; Level: Continental Championships (Super 300); Format: 64MS/32WS/16MD/16WD/32XD	(Canada) Rachel Honderich (Canada) Kristen Tsai	(United States) Francesca Corbett (United States) Allison Lee
26 April	Pan American Badminton Championships (Draw): Host: Guatemala City, Guatemala; Venue: Teodoro Palacios Flores; Level: Continental Championships (Super 300); Format: 64MS/32WS/16MD/16WD/32XD	Score: 21–12, 21–7	
26 April	Pan American Badminton Championships (Draw): Host: Guatemala City, Guatemala; Venue: Teodoro Palacios Flores; Level: Continental Championships (Super 300); Format: 64MS/32WS/16MD/16WD/32XD	(Canada) Joshua Hurlburt-Yu (Canada) Josephine Wu	(Guatemala) Christopher Martínez (Guatemala) Mariana Paiz
26 April	Pan American Badminton Championships (Draw): Host: Guatemala City, Guatemala; Venue: Teodoro Palacios Flores; Level: Continental Championships (Super 300); Format: 64MS/32WS/16MD/16WD/32XD	Score: 21–18, 21–18	

=== May ===
Week commencing	Tournament	Champions	Runners-up
3 May	New Zealand Open (Draw) (cancelled) (Note: Tournament cancelled due to the COVID-19 pandemic on 28 June 2021.): Host: Auckland, New Zealand; Venue: Eventfinda Stadium; Level: Super 300; Prize: $200,000; Format: 32MS/32WS/32MD/32WD/32XD		
3 May	New Zealand Open (Draw) (cancelled): Host: Auckland, New Zealand; Venue: Eventfinda Stadium; Level: Super 300; Prize: $200,000; Format: 32MS/32WS/32MD/32WD/32XD	Score:	
3 May	New Zealand Open (Draw) (cancelled): Host: Auckland, New Zealand; Venue: Eventfinda Stadium; Level: Super 300; Prize: $200,000; Format: 32MS/32WS/32MD/32WD/32XD	Score:	
3 May	New Zealand Open (Draw) (cancelled): Host: Auckland, New Zealand; Venue: Eventfinda Stadium; Level: Super 300; Prize: $200,000; Format: 32MS/32WS/32MD/32WD/32XD	Score:	
3 May	New Zealand Open (Draw) (cancelled): Host: Auckland, New Zealand; Venue: Eventfinda Stadium; Level: Super 300; Prize: $200,000; Format: 32MS/32WS/32MD/32WD/32XD	Score:	
3 May	New Zealand Open (Draw) (cancelled): Host: Auckland, New Zealand; Venue: Eventfinda Stadium; Level: Super 300; Prize: $200,000; Format: 32MS/32WS/32MD/32WD/32XD	Score:	
3 May	Portuguese International: Host: Caldas da Rainha, Portugal; Venue: Badminton High Performance Sports Centre; Level: International Series; Prize: $10,000; Format: 32MS/32WS/32MD/32WD/32XD	(Denmark) Ditlev Jæger Holm	(Germany) Max Weißkirchen
3 May	Portuguese International: Host: Caldas da Rainha, Portugal; Venue: Badminton High Performance Sports Centre; Level: International Series; Prize: $10,000; Format: 32MS/32WS/32MD/32WD/32XD	Score: 21–15, 21–17	
3 May	Portuguese International: Host: Caldas da Rainha, Portugal; Venue: Badminton High Performance Sports Centre; Level: International Series; Prize: $10,000; Format: 32MS/32WS/32MD/32WD/32XD	(Hungary) Laura Sárosi	(France) Marie Batomene
3 May	Portuguese International: Host: Caldas da Rainha, Portugal; Venue: Badminton High Performance Sports Centre; Level: International Series; Prize: $10,000; Format: 32MS/32WS/32MD/32WD/32XD	Score: 21–19, 21–19	
3 May	Portuguese International: Host: Caldas da Rainha, Portugal; Venue: Badminton High Performance Sports Centre; Level: International Series; Prize: $10,000; Format: 32MS/32WS/32MD/32WD/32XD	(Denmark) Mads Pieler Kolding (Denmark) Frederik Søgaard	(Denmark) Emil Lauritzen (Denmark) Mads Vestergaard
3 May	Portuguese International: Host: Caldas da Rainha, Portugal; Venue: Badminton High Performance Sports Centre; Level: International Series; Prize: $10,000; Format: 32MS/32WS/32MD/32WD/32XD	Score: 21–17, 21–18	
3 May	Portuguese International: Host: Caldas da Rainha, Portugal; Venue: Badminton High Performance Sports Centre; Level: International Series; Prize: $10,000; Format: 32MS/32WS/32MD/32WD/32XD	(Denmark) Christine Busch (Denmark) Amalie Schulz	(Estonia) Kati-Kreet Marran (Estonia) Helina Rüütel
3 May	Portuguese International: Host: Caldas da Rainha, Portugal; Venue: Badminton High Performance Sports Centre; Level: International Series; Prize: $10,000; Format: 32MS/32WS/32MD/32WD/32XD	Score: 21–16, 21–14	
3 May	Portuguese International: Host: Caldas da Rainha, Portugal; Venue: Badminton High Performance Sports Centre; Level: International Series; Prize: $10,000; Format: 32MS/32WS/32MD/32WD/32XD	(England) Callum Hemming (England) Jessica Pugh	(France) William Villeger (France) Sharone Bauer
3 May	Portuguese International: Host: Caldas da Rainha, Portugal; Venue: Badminton High Performance Sports Centre; Level: International Series; Prize: $10,000; Format: 32MS/32WS/32MD/32WD/32XD	Score: 21–18, 19–21, 21–15	
10 May	India Open (Draw) (cancelled): Host: New Delhi, India; Venue: K. D. Jadhav Indoor Stadium; Level: Super 500; Prize: $400,000; Format: 32MS/32WS/32MD/32WD/32XD		
10 May	India Open (Draw) (cancelled): Host: New Delhi, India; Venue: K. D. Jadhav Indoor Stadium; Level: Super 500; Prize: $400,000; Format: 32MS/32WS/32MD/32WD/32XD	Score:	
10 May	India Open (Draw) (cancelled): Host: New Delhi, India; Venue: K. D. Jadhav Indoor Stadium; Level: Super 500; Prize: $400,000; Format: 32MS/32WS/32MD/32WD/32XD	Score:	
10 May	India Open (Draw) (cancelled): Host: New Delhi, India; Venue: K. D. Jadhav Indoor Stadium; Level: Super 500; Prize: $400,000; Format: 32MS/32WS/32MD/32WD/32XD	Score:	
10 May	India Open (Draw) (cancelled): Host: New Delhi, India; Venue: K. D. Jadhav Indoor Stadium; Level: Super 500; Prize: $400,000; Format: 32MS/32WS/32MD/32WD/32XD	Score:	
10 May	India Open (Draw) (cancelled): Host: New Delhi, India; Venue: K. D. Jadhav Indoor Stadium; Level: Super 500; Prize: $400,000; Format: 32MS/32WS/32MD/32WD/32XD	Score:	
10 May	Australian Open (Draw) (cancelled): Host: Sydney, Australia; Venue: Sydney Olympic Park; Level: Super 300; Prize: $200,000; Format: 32MS/32WS/32MD/32WD/32XD		
10 May	Australian Open (Draw) (cancelled): Host: Sydney, Australia; Venue: Sydney Olympic Park; Level: Super 300; Prize: $200,000; Format: 32MS/32WS/32MD/32WD/32XD	Score:	
10 May	Australian Open (Draw) (cancelled): Host: Sydney, Australia; Venue: Sydney Olympic Park; Level: Super 300; Prize: $200,000; Format: 32MS/32WS/32MD/32WD/32XD	Score:	
10 May	Australian Open (Draw) (cancelled): Host: Sydney, Australia; Venue: Sydney Olympic Park; Level: Super 300; Prize: $200,000; Format: 32MS/32WS/32MD/32WD/32XD	Score:	
10 May	Australian Open (Draw) (cancelled): Host: Sydney, Australia; Venue: Sydney Olympic Park; Level: Super 300; Prize: $200,000; Format: 32MS/32WS/32MD/32WD/32XD	Score:	
10 May	Australian Open (Draw) (cancelled): Host: Sydney, Australia; Venue: Sydney Olympic Park; Level: Super 300; Prize: $200,000; Format: 32MS/32WS/32MD/32WD/32XD	Score:	
17 May	Spain Masters (Draw): Host: Huelva, Spain; Venue: Palacio de los Deportes Carolina Marín; Level: Super 300; Prize: $140,000; Format: 32MS/32WS/32MD/32WD/32XD	(France) Toma Junior Popov	(Indonesia) Chico Aura Dwi Wardoyo
17 May	Spain Masters (Draw): Host: Huelva, Spain; Venue: Palacio de los Deportes Carolina Marín; Level: Super 300; Prize: $140,000; Format: 32MS/32WS/32MD/32WD/32XD	Score: 21–15, 21–17	
17 May	Spain Masters (Draw): Host: Huelva, Spain; Venue: Palacio de los Deportes Carolina Marín; Level: Super 300; Prize: $140,000; Format: 32MS/32WS/32MD/32WD/32XD	(Indonesia) Putri Kusuma Wardani	(Denmark) Line Christophersen
17 May	Spain Masters (Draw): Host: Huelva, Spain; Venue: Palacio de los Deportes Carolina Marín; Level: Super 300; Prize: $140,000; Format: 32MS/32WS/32MD/32WD/32XD	Score: 21–15, 21–10	
17 May	Spain Masters (Draw): Host: Huelva, Spain; Venue: Palacio de los Deportes Carolina Marín; Level: Super 300; Prize: $140,000; Format: 32MS/32WS/32MD/32WD/32XD	(Indonesia) Pramudya Kusumawardana (Indonesia) Yeremia Rambitan	(Indonesia) Sabar Karyaman Gutama (Indonesia) Muhammad Reza Pahlevi Isfahani
17 May	Spain Masters (Draw): Host: Huelva, Spain; Venue: Palacio de los Deportes Carolina Marín; Level: Super 300; Prize: $140,000; Format: 32MS/32WS/32MD/32WD/32XD	Score: 21–15, 18–21, 21–14	
17 May	Spain Masters (Draw): Host: Huelva, Spain; Venue: Palacio de los Deportes Carolina Marín; Level: Super 300; Prize: $140,000; Format: 32MS/32WS/32MD/32WD/32XD	(Indonesia) Yulfira Barkah (Indonesia) Febby Valencia Dwijayanti Gani	(Denmark) Amalie Magelund (Denmark) Freja Ravn
17 May	Spain Masters (Draw): Host: Huelva, Spain; Venue: Palacio de los Deportes Carolina Marín; Level: Super 300; Prize: $140,000; Format: 32MS/32WS/32MD/32WD/32XD	Score: 21–16, 21–14	
17 May	Spain Masters (Draw): Host: Huelva, Spain; Venue: Palacio de los Deportes Carolina Marín; Level: Super 300; Prize: $140,000; Format: 32MS/32WS/32MD/32WD/32XD	(Indonesia) Rinov Rivaldy (Indonesia) Pitha Haningtyas Mentari	(Denmark) Niclas Nøhr (Denmark) Amalie Magelund
17 May	Spain Masters (Draw): Host: Huelva, Spain; Venue: Palacio de los Deportes Carolina Marín; Level: Super 300; Prize: $140,000; Format: 32MS/32WS/32MD/32WD/32XD	Score: 21–18, 21–15	
17 May	Slovenian International: Host: Medvode, Slovenia; Venue: Sport hall Medvode; Level: International Series; Prize: $5,000; Format: 64MS/32WS/32MD/32WD/32XD	(France) Arnaud Merklé	(Indonesia) Panji Ahmad Maulana
17 May	Slovenian International: Host: Medvode, Slovenia; Venue: Sport hall Medvode; Level: International Series; Prize: $5,000; Format: 64MS/32WS/32MD/32WD/32XD	Score: 21–8, 21–10	
17 May	Slovenian International: Host: Medvode, Slovenia; Venue: Sport hall Medvode; Level: International Series; Prize: $5,000; Format: 64MS/32WS/32MD/32WD/32XD	(Indonesia) Mutiara Ayu Puspitasari	(Hungary) Ágnes Körösi
17 May	Slovenian International: Host: Medvode, Slovenia; Venue: Sport hall Medvode; Level: International Series; Prize: $5,000; Format: 64MS/32WS/32MD/32WD/32XD	Score: 21–14, 19–21, 21–16	
17 May	Slovenian International: Host: Medvode, Slovenia; Venue: Sport hall Medvode; Level: International Series; Prize: $5,000; Format: 64MS/32WS/32MD/32WD/32XD	(Indonesia) Putra Erwiansyah (Indonesia) Patra Harapan Rindorindo	(Denmark) William Kryger Boe (Denmark) Christian Faust Kjær
17 May	Slovenian International: Host: Medvode, Slovenia; Venue: Sport hall Medvode; Level: International Series; Prize: $5,000; Format: 64MS/32WS/32MD/32WD/32XD	Score: 21–13, 21–13	
17 May	Slovenian International: Host: Medvode, Slovenia; Venue: Sport hall Medvode; Level: International Series; Prize: $5,000; Format: 64MS/32WS/32MD/32WD/32XD	(Malaysia) Low Yeen Yuan (Malaysia) Valeree Siow	(Denmark) Isabella Nielsen (Denmark) Marie Louise Steffensen
17 May	Slovenian International: Host: Medvode, Slovenia; Venue: Sport hall Medvode; Level: International Series; Prize: $5,000; Format: 64MS/32WS/32MD/32WD/32XD	Score: 21–11, 21–15	
17 May	Slovenian International: Host: Medvode, Slovenia; Venue: Sport hall Medvode; Level: International Series; Prize: $5,000; Format: 64MS/32WS/32MD/32WD/32XD	(Malaysia) Choong Hon Jian (Malaysia) Toh Ee Wei	(Indonesia) Putra Erwiansyah (Indonesia) Sofy Al Mushira Asharunnisa
17 May	Slovenian International: Host: Medvode, Slovenia; Venue: Sport hall Medvode; Level: International Series; Prize: $5,000; Format: 64MS/32WS/32MD/32WD/32XD	Score: 21–18, 21–18	
24 May	Malaysia Open (Draw) (postponed): Host: Kuala Lumpur, Malaysia; Venue: Axiata Arena; Level: Super 750; Prize: $600,000; Format: 32MS/32WS/32MD/32WD/32XD		
24 May	Malaysia Open (Draw) (postponed): Host: Kuala Lumpur, Malaysia; Venue: Axiata Arena; Level: Super 750; Prize: $600,000; Format: 32MS/32WS/32MD/32WD/32XD	Score:	
24 May	Malaysia Open (Draw) (postponed): Host: Kuala Lumpur, Malaysia; Venue: Axiata Arena; Level: Super 750; Prize: $600,000; Format: 32MS/32WS/32MD/32WD/32XD	Score:	
24 May	Malaysia Open (Draw) (postponed): Host: Kuala Lumpur, Malaysia; Venue: Axiata Arena; Level: Super 750; Prize: $600,000; Format: 32MS/32WS/32MD/32WD/32XD	Score:	
24 May	Malaysia Open (Draw) (postponed): Host: Kuala Lumpur, Malaysia; Venue: Axiata Arena; Level: Super 750; Prize: $600,000; Format: 32MS/32WS/32MD/32WD/32XD	Score:	
24 May	Malaysia Open (Draw) (postponed): Host: Kuala Lumpur, Malaysia; Venue: Axiata Arena; Level: Super 750; Prize: $600,000; Format: 32MS/32WS/32MD/32WD/32XD	Score:	
24 May	Austrian Open: Host: Graz, Austria; Venue: Raiffeisen Sportpark; Level: International Series; Prize: $5,000; Format: 32MS/32WS/32MD/32WD/32XD	(Indonesia) Panji Ahmad Maulana	(France) Arnaud Merklé
24 May	Austrian Open: Host: Graz, Austria; Venue: Raiffeisen Sportpark; Level: International Series; Prize: $5,000; Format: 32MS/32WS/32MD/32WD/32XD	Score: 11–21, 21–8, 21–15	
24 May	Austrian Open: Host: Graz, Austria; Venue: Raiffeisen Sportpark; Level: International Series; Prize: $5,000; Format: 32MS/32WS/32MD/32WD/32XD	(Spain) Clara Azurmendi	(France) Yaëlle Hoyaux
24 May	Austrian Open: Host: Graz, Austria; Venue: Raiffeisen Sportpark; Level: International Series; Prize: $5,000; Format: 32MS/32WS/32MD/32WD/32XD	Score: 21–6, 21–14	
24 May	Austrian Open: Host: Graz, Austria; Venue: Raiffeisen Sportpark; Level: International Series; Prize: $5,000; Format: 32MS/32WS/32MD/32WD/32XD	(Malaysia) Junaidi Arif (Malaysia) Muhammad Haikal	(France) Lucas Corvée (France) Ronan Labar
24 May	Austrian Open: Host: Graz, Austria; Venue: Raiffeisen Sportpark; Level: International Series; Prize: $5,000; Format: 32MS/32WS/32MD/32WD/32XD	Score: 21–17, 21–15	
24 May	Austrian Open: Host: Graz, Austria; Venue: Raiffeisen Sportpark; Level: International Series; Prize: $5,000; Format: 32MS/32WS/32MD/32WD/32XD	(Indonesia) Ni Ketut Mahadewi Istarani (Indonesia) Serena Kani	(Malaysia) Anna Cheong (Malaysia) Yap Cheng Wen
24 May	Austrian Open: Host: Graz, Austria; Venue: Raiffeisen Sportpark; Level: International Series; Prize: $5,000; Format: 32MS/32WS/32MD/32WD/32XD	Score: 21–11, 21–16	
24 May	Austrian Open: Host: Graz, Austria; Venue: Raiffeisen Sportpark; Level: International Series; Prize: $5,000; Format: 32MS/32WS/32MD/32WD/32XD	(Malaysia) Choong Hon Jian (Malaysia) Toh Ee Wei	(France) William Villeger (France) Sharone Bauer
24 May	Austrian Open: Host: Graz, Austria; Venue: Raiffeisen Sportpark; Level: International Series; Prize: $5,000; Format: 32MS/32WS/32MD/32WD/32XD	Score: 16–21, 21–9, 21–19	
31 May	Singapore Open (Draw) (cancelled) (Note: Singapore Open cancelled due to the COVID-19 pandemic on 12 May 2021.): Host: Singapore; Venue: Singapore Indoor Stadium; Level: Super 500; Prize: $320,000; Format: 32MS/32WS/32MD/32WD/32XD		
31 May	Singapore Open (Draw) (cancelled): Host: Singapore; Venue: Singapore Indoor Stadium; Level: Super 500; Prize: $320,000; Format: 32MS/32WS/32MD/32WD/32XD	Score:	
31 May	Singapore Open (Draw) (cancelled): Host: Singapore; Venue: Singapore Indoor Stadium; Level: Super 500; Prize: $320,000; Format: 32MS/32WS/32MD/32WD/32XD	Score:	
31 May	Singapore Open (Draw) (cancelled): Host: Singapore; Venue: Singapore Indoor Stadium; Level: Super 500; Prize: $320,000; Format: 32MS/32WS/32MD/32WD/32XD	Score:	
31 May	Singapore Open (Draw) (cancelled): Host: Singapore; Venue: Singapore Indoor Stadium; Level: Super 500; Prize: $320,000; Format: 32MS/32WS/32MD/32WD/32XD	Score:	
31 May	Singapore Open (Draw) (cancelled): Host: Singapore; Venue: Singapore Indoor Stadium; Level: Super 500; Prize: $320,000; Format: 32MS/32WS/32MD/32WD/32XD	Score:	
31 May	Korea Masters (Draw) (cancelled) (Note: Tournament cancelled due to the COVID-19 pandemic on 11 August 2021.): Host: TBD, South Korea; Venue: TBD; Level: Super 300; Prize: $200,000; Format: 32MS/32WS/32MD/32WD/32XD		
31 May	Korea Masters (Draw) (cancelled): Host: TBD, South Korea; Venue: TBD; Level: Super 300; Prize: $200,000; Format: 32MS/32WS/32MD/32WD/32XD	Score:	
31 May	Korea Masters (Draw) (cancelled): Host: TBD, South Korea; Venue: TBD; Level: Super 300; Prize: $200,000; Format: 32MS/32WS/32MD/32WD/32XD	Score:	
31 May	Korea Masters (Draw) (cancelled): Host: TBD, South Korea; Venue: TBD; Level: Super 300; Prize: $200,000; Format: 32MS/32WS/32MD/32WD/32XD	Score:	
31 May	Korea Masters (Draw) (cancelled): Host: TBD, South Korea; Venue: TBD; Level: Super 300; Prize: $200,000; Format: 32MS/32WS/32MD/32WD/32XD	Score:	
31 May	Korea Masters (Draw) (cancelled): Host: TBD, South Korea; Venue: TBD; Level: Super 300; Prize: $200,000; Format: 32MS/32WS/32MD/32WD/32XD	Score:	

=== June ===
Week commencing	Tournament	Champions	Runners-up
7 June	Lithuanian International: Host: Kaunas, Lithuania; Venue: VS Fitness-MEGA; Level: Future Series; Format: 32MS/32WS/32MD/16WD/32XD	(France) Alex Lanier	(Canada) B. R. Sankeerth
7 June	Lithuanian International: Host: Kaunas, Lithuania; Venue: VS Fitness-MEGA; Level: Future Series; Format: 32MS/32WS/32MD/16WD/32XD	Score: 18–21, 23–21, 21–15	
7 June	Lithuanian International: Host: Kaunas, Lithuania; Venue: VS Fitness-MEGA; Level: Future Series; Format: 32MS/32WS/32MD/16WD/32XD	(India) Malvika Bansod	(Republic of Ireland) Rachael Darragh
7 June	Lithuanian International: Host: Kaunas, Lithuania; Venue: VS Fitness-MEGA; Level: Future Series; Format: 32MS/32WS/32MD/16WD/32XD	Score: 21–14, 21–11	
7 June	Lithuanian International: Host: Kaunas, Lithuania; Venue: VS Fitness-MEGA; Level: Future Series; Format: 32MS/32WS/32MD/16WD/32XD	(Denmark) Emil Lauritzen (Denmark) Mads Vestergaard	(Ukraine) Danylo Bosniuk (Ukraine) Oleksandar Shmundyak
7 June	Lithuanian International: Host: Kaunas, Lithuania; Venue: VS Fitness-MEGA; Level: Future Series; Format: 32MS/32WS/32MD/16WD/32XD	Score: 21–23, 21–12, 21–18	
7 June	Lithuanian International: Host: Kaunas, Lithuania; Venue: VS Fitness-MEGA; Level: Future Series; Format: 32MS/32WS/32MD/16WD/32XD	(France) Téa Margueritte (France) Anna Tatranova	(Spain) Nerea Ivorra (Spain) Claudia Leal
7 June	Lithuanian International: Host: Kaunas, Lithuania; Venue: VS Fitness-MEGA; Level: Future Series; Format: 32MS/32WS/32MD/16WD/32XD	Score: 21–13, 21–17	
7 June	Lithuanian International: Host: Kaunas, Lithuania; Venue: VS Fitness-MEGA; Level: Future Series; Format: 32MS/32WS/32MD/16WD/32XD	(Denmark) Mads Vestergaard (Denmark) Clara Løber	(Kazakhstan) Dmitriy Panarin (Kazakhstan) Kamila Smagulova
7 June	Lithuanian International: Host: Kaunas, Lithuania; Venue: VS Fitness-MEGA; Level: Future Series; Format: 32MS/32WS/32MD/16WD/32XD	Score: 21–12, 21–16	
14 June	Thailand Open (Draw) (cancelled) (Note: Tournament cancelled due to the COVID-19 pandemic.): Host: Bangkok, Thailand; Venue: Indoor Stadium Huamark; Level: Super 500; Prize: $400,000; Format: 32MS/32WS/32MD/32WD/32XD		
14 June	Thailand Open (Draw) (cancelled): Host: Bangkok, Thailand; Venue: Indoor Stadium Huamark; Level: Super 500; Prize: $400,000; Format: 32MS/32WS/32MD/32WD/32XD	Score:	
14 June	Thailand Open (Draw) (cancelled): Host: Bangkok, Thailand; Venue: Indoor Stadium Huamark; Level: Super 500; Prize: $400,000; Format: 32MS/32WS/32MD/32WD/32XD	Score:	
14 June	Thailand Open (Draw) (cancelled): Host: Bangkok, Thailand; Venue: Indoor Stadium Huamark; Level: Super 500; Prize: $400,000; Format: 32MS/32WS/32MD/32WD/32XD	Score:	
14 June	Thailand Open (Draw) (cancelled): Host: Bangkok, Thailand; Venue: Indoor Stadium Huamark; Level: Super 500; Prize: $400,000; Format: 32MS/32WS/32MD/32WD/32XD	Score:	
14 June	Thailand Open (Draw) (cancelled): Host: Bangkok, Thailand; Venue: Indoor Stadium Huamark; Level: Super 500; Prize: $400,000; Format: 32MS/32WS/32MD/32WD/32XD	Score:	
14 June	Spanish International: Host: La Nucia, Spain; Venue: Ciudad Deportiva Camilo Cano; Level: International Challenge; Prize: $15,000; Format: 32MS/32WS/32MD/32WD/32XD	(Spain) Pablo Abián	(Czech Republic) Jan Louda
14 June	Spanish International: Host: La Nucia, Spain; Venue: Ciudad Deportiva Camilo Cano; Level: International Challenge; Prize: $15,000; Format: 32MS/32WS/32MD/32WD/32XD	Score: 22–20, 20–22, 21–14	
14 June	Spanish International: Host: La Nucia, Spain; Venue: Ciudad Deportiva Camilo Cano; Level: International Challenge; Prize: $15,000; Format: 32MS/32WS/32MD/32WD/32XD	(Malaysia) Kisona Selvaduray	(Malaysia) Goh Jin Wei
14 June	Spanish International: Host: La Nucia, Spain; Venue: Ciudad Deportiva Camilo Cano; Level: International Challenge; Prize: $15,000; Format: 32MS/32WS/32MD/32WD/32XD	Score: 21–14, 21–19	
14 June	Spanish International: Host: La Nucia, Spain; Venue: Ciudad Deportiva Camilo Cano; Level: International Challenge; Prize: $15,000; Format: 32MS/32WS/32MD/32WD/32XD	(Malaysia) Man Wei Chong (Malaysia) Tee Kai Wun	(France) Lucas Corvée (France) Ronan Labar
14 June	Spanish International: Host: La Nucia, Spain; Venue: Ciudad Deportiva Camilo Cano; Level: International Challenge; Prize: $15,000; Format: 32MS/32WS/32MD/32WD/32XD	Score: 21–15, 21–18	
14 June	Spanish International: Host: La Nucia, Spain; Venue: Ciudad Deportiva Camilo Cano; Level: International Challenge; Prize: $15,000; Format: 32MS/32WS/32MD/32WD/32XD	(Netherlands) Alyssa Tirtosentono (Netherlands) Imke van der Aar	(Spain) Paula López (Spain) Lorena Uslé
14 June	Spanish International: Host: La Nucia, Spain; Venue: Ciudad Deportiva Camilo Cano; Level: International Challenge; Prize: $15,000; Format: 32MS/32WS/32MD/32WD/32XD	Score: 21–11, 21–19	
14 June	Spanish International: Host: La Nucia, Spain; Venue: Ciudad Deportiva Camilo Cano; Level: International Challenge; Prize: $15,000; Format: 32MS/32WS/32MD/32WD/32XD	(Malaysia) Tee Kai Wun (Malaysia) Teoh Mei Xing	(England) Callum Hemming (England) Jessica Pugh
14 June	Spanish International: Host: La Nucia, Spain; Venue: Ciudad Deportiva Camilo Cano; Level: International Challenge; Prize: $15,000; Format: 32MS/32WS/32MD/32WD/32XD	Score: 21–15, 13–21, 21–19	
14 June	German International (cancelled) (Note: Tournament cancelled due to the COVID-19 pandemic on 2 March 2021.): Host: Bonn, Germany; Venue: Erwin Kranz Halle; Level: Future Series; Format: TBD		
14 June	German International (cancelled): Host: Bonn, Germany; Venue: Erwin Kranz Halle; Level: Future Series; Format: TBD	Score:	
14 June	German International (cancelled): Host: Bonn, Germany; Venue: Erwin Kranz Halle; Level: Future Series; Format: TBD	Score:	
14 June	German International (cancelled): Host: Bonn, Germany; Venue: Erwin Kranz Halle; Level: Future Series; Format: TBD	Score:	
14 June	German International (cancelled): Host: Bonn, Germany; Venue: Erwin Kranz Halle; Level: Future Series; Format: TBD	Score:	
14 June	German International (cancelled): Host: Bonn, Germany; Venue: Erwin Kranz Halle; Level: Future Series; Format: TBD	Score:	
28 June	Canada Open (Draw) (cancelled) (Note: Tournament cancelled due to the COVID-19 pandemic on 12 March 2021.): Host: Calgary, Canada; Venue: WinSport; Level: Super 100; Prize: $100,000; Format: 48MS/32WS/32MD/32WD/32XD		
28 June	Canada Open (Draw) (cancelled): Host: Calgary, Canada; Venue: WinSport; Level: Super 100; Prize: $100,000; Format: 48MS/32WS/32MD/32WD/32XD	Score:	
28 June	Canada Open (Draw) (cancelled): Host: Calgary, Canada; Venue: WinSport; Level: Super 100; Prize: $100,000; Format: 48MS/32WS/32MD/32WD/32XD	Score:	
28 June	Canada Open (Draw) (cancelled): Host: Calgary, Canada; Venue: WinSport; Level: Super 100; Prize: $100,000; Format: 48MS/32WS/32MD/32WD/32XD	Score:	
28 June	Canada Open (Draw) (cancelled): Host: Calgary, Canada; Venue: WinSport; Level: Super 100; Prize: $100,000; Format: 48MS/32WS/32MD/32WD/32XD	Score:	
28 June	Canada Open (Draw) (cancelled): Host: Calgary, Canada; Venue: WinSport; Level: Super 100; Prize: $100,000; Format: 48MS/32WS/32MD/32WD/32XD	Score:	

=== July ===
Week commencing	Tournament	Champions	Runners-up
5 July	U.S. Open (Draw) (cancelled) (Note: Tournament cancelled due to the COVID-19 pandemic on 12 March 2021.): Host: Fullerton, California, United States; Venue: TBD; Level: Super 300; Prize: $200,000; Format: 32MS/32WS/32MD/32WD/32XD		
5 July	U.S. Open (Draw) (cancelled): Host: Fullerton, California, United States; Venue: TBD; Level: Super 300; Prize: $200,000; Format: 32MS/32WS/32MD/32WD/32XD	Score:	
5 July	U.S. Open (Draw) (cancelled): Host: Fullerton, California, United States; Venue: TBD; Level: Super 300; Prize: $200,000; Format: 32MS/32WS/32MD/32WD/32XD	Score:	
5 July	U.S. Open (Draw) (cancelled): Host: Fullerton, California, United States; Venue: TBD; Level: Super 300; Prize: $200,000; Format: 32MS/32WS/32MD/32WD/32XD	Score:	
5 July	U.S. Open (Draw) (cancelled): Host: Fullerton, California, United States; Venue: TBD; Level: Super 300; Prize: $200,000; Format: 32MS/32WS/32MD/32WD/32XD	Score:	
5 July	U.S. Open (Draw) (cancelled): Host: Fullerton, California, United States; Venue: TBD; Level: Super 300; Prize: $200,000; Format: 32MS/32WS/32MD/32WD/32XD	Score:	
5 July	Vietnam International Challenge (cancelled) (Note: Tournament cancelled due to the COVID-19 pandemic on 26 May 2021.): Host: Hanoi, Vietnam; Venue: Tay Ho District Stadium; Level: International Challenge; Prize: $25,000; Format: TBD		
5 July	Vietnam International Challenge (cancelled): Host: Hanoi, Vietnam; Venue: Tay Ho District Stadium; Level: International Challenge; Prize: $25,000; Format: TBD	Score:	
5 July	Vietnam International Challenge (cancelled): Host: Hanoi, Vietnam; Venue: Tay Ho District Stadium; Level: International Challenge; Prize: $25,000; Format: TBD	Score:	
5 July	Vietnam International Challenge (cancelled): Host: Hanoi, Vietnam; Venue: Tay Ho District Stadium; Level: International Challenge; Prize: $25,000; Format: TBD	Score:	
5 July	Vietnam International Challenge (cancelled): Host: Hanoi, Vietnam; Venue: Tay Ho District Stadium; Level: International Challenge; Prize: $25,000; Format: TBD	Score:	
5 July	Vietnam International Challenge (cancelled): Host: Hanoi, Vietnam; Venue: Tay Ho District Stadium; Level: International Challenge; Prize: $25,000; Format: TBD	Score:	
5 July	White Nights (cancelled) (Note: Tournament cancelled due to the COVID-19 pandemic on 30 March 2021.): Host: Gatchina, Russia; Venue: FOK Arena; Level: International Challenge; Prize: $25,000; Format: TBD		
5 July	White Nights (cancelled): Host: Gatchina, Russia; Venue: FOK Arena; Level: International Challenge; Prize: $25,000; Format: TBD	Score:	
5 July	White Nights (cancelled): Host: Gatchina, Russia; Venue: FOK Arena; Level: International Challenge; Prize: $25,000; Format: TBD	Score:	
5 July	White Nights (cancelled): Host: Gatchina, Russia; Venue: FOK Arena; Level: International Challenge; Prize: $25,000; Format: TBD	Score:	
5 July	White Nights (cancelled): Host: Gatchina, Russia; Venue: FOK Arena; Level: International Challenge; Prize: $25,000; Format: TBD	Score:	
5 July	White Nights (cancelled): Host: Gatchina, Russia; Venue: FOK Arena; Level: International Challenge; Prize: $25,000; Format: TBD	Score:	
19 July	Russian Open (Draw) (cancelled) (Note: This tournament, originally to be played between 20 and 25 July, was later cancelled due to the COVID-19 pandemic in Russia.): Host: Vladivostok, Russia; Venue: TBD; Level: Super 100; Prize: $100,000; Format: 48MS/32WS/32MD/32WD/32XD		
19 July	Russian Open (Draw) (cancelled): Host: Vladivostok, Russia; Venue: TBD; Level: Super 100; Prize: $100,000; Format: 48MS/32WS/32MD/32WD/32XD	Score:	
19 July	Russian Open (Draw) (cancelled): Host: Vladivostok, Russia; Venue: TBD; Level: Super 100; Prize: $100,000; Format: 48MS/32WS/32MD/32WD/32XD	Score:	
19 July	Russian Open (Draw) (cancelled): Host: Vladivostok, Russia; Venue: TBD; Level: Super 100; Prize: $100,000; Format: 48MS/32WS/32MD/32WD/32XD	Score:	
19 July	Russian Open (Draw) (cancelled): Host: Vladivostok, Russia; Venue: TBD; Level: Super 100; Prize: $100,000; Format: 48MS/32WS/32MD/32WD/32XD	Score:	
19 July	Russian Open (Draw) (cancelled): Host: Vladivostok, Russia; Venue: TBD; Level: Super 100; Prize: $100,000; Format: 48MS/32WS/32MD/32WD/32XD	Score:	
19 July	Olympic Games (Draw): Host: Tokyo, Japan; Venue: Musashino Forest Sport Plaza; Level: World Championships; Format: 41MS/43WS/16MD/16WD/16XD	(Denmark) Viktor Axelsen	(China) Chen Long
19 July	Olympic Games (Draw): Host: Tokyo, Japan; Venue: Musashino Forest Sport Plaza; Level: World Championships; Format: 41MS/43WS/16MD/16WD/16XD	Score: 21–15, 21–12	
19 July	Olympic Games (Draw): Host: Tokyo, Japan; Venue: Musashino Forest Sport Plaza; Level: World Championships; Format: 41MS/43WS/16MD/16WD/16XD	(China) Chen Yufei	(Chinese Taipei) Tai Tzu-ying
19 July	Olympic Games (Draw): Host: Tokyo, Japan; Venue: Musashino Forest Sport Plaza; Level: World Championships; Format: 41MS/43WS/16MD/16WD/16XD	Score: 21–18, 19–21, 21–18	
19 July	Olympic Games (Draw): Host: Tokyo, Japan; Venue: Musashino Forest Sport Plaza; Level: World Championships; Format: 41MS/43WS/16MD/16WD/16XD	(Chinese Taipei) Lee Yang (Chinese Taipei) Wang Chi-lin	(China) Li Junhui (China) Liu Yuchen
19 July	Olympic Games (Draw): Host: Tokyo, Japan; Venue: Musashino Forest Sport Plaza; Level: World Championships; Format: 41MS/43WS/16MD/16WD/16XD	Score: 21–18, 21–12	
19 July	Olympic Games (Draw): Host: Tokyo, Japan; Venue: Musashino Forest Sport Plaza; Level: World Championships; Format: 41MS/43WS/16MD/16WD/16XD	(Indonesia) Greysia Polii (Indonesia) Apriyani Rahayu	(China) Chen Qingchen (China) Jia Yifan
19 July	Olympic Games (Draw): Host: Tokyo, Japan; Venue: Musashino Forest Sport Plaza; Level: World Championships; Format: 41MS/43WS/16MD/16WD/16XD	Score: 21–19, 21–15	
19 July	Olympic Games (Draw): Host: Tokyo, Japan; Venue: Musashino Forest Sport Plaza; Level: World Championships; Format: 41MS/43WS/16MD/16WD/16XD	(China) Wang Yilyu (China) Huang Dongping	(China) Zheng Siwei (China) Huang Yaqiong
19 July	Olympic Games (Draw): Host: Tokyo, Japan; Venue: Musashino Forest Sport Plaza; Level: World Championships; Format: 41MS/43WS/16MD/16WD/16XD	Score: 21–17, 17–21, 21–19	

=== August ===
Week commencing	Tournament	Champions	Runners-up
2 August	Denmark Masters: Host: Esbjerg, Denmark; Venue: Blue Water Dokken; Level: International Challenge; Prize: $25,000; Format: 32MS/32WS/32MD/32WD/32XD	(Canada) Brian Yang	(Denmark) Victor Svendsen
2 August	Denmark Masters: Host: Esbjerg, Denmark; Venue: Blue Water Dokken; Level: International Challenge; Prize: $25,000; Format: 32MS/32WS/32MD/32WD/32XD	Score: 16–21, 21–17, 21–15	
2 August	Denmark Masters: Host: Esbjerg, Denmark; Venue: Blue Water Dokken; Level: International Challenge; Prize: $25,000; Format: 32MS/32WS/32MD/32WD/32XD	(Denmark) Line Christophersen	(Denmark) Julie Dawall Jakobsen
2 August	Denmark Masters: Host: Esbjerg, Denmark; Venue: Blue Water Dokken; Level: International Challenge; Prize: $25,000; Format: 32MS/32WS/32MD/32WD/32XD	Score: 21–11, 21–17	
2 August	Denmark Masters: Host: Esbjerg, Denmark; Venue: Blue Water Dokken; Level: International Challenge; Prize: $25,000; Format: 32MS/32WS/32MD/32WD/32XD	(Denmark) Daniel Lundgaard (Denmark) Mathias Thyrri	(France) Lucas Corvée (France) Ronan Labar
2 August	Denmark Masters: Host: Esbjerg, Denmark; Venue: Blue Water Dokken; Level: International Challenge; Prize: $25,000; Format: 32MS/32WS/32MD/32WD/32XD	Score: 24–22, 21–19	
2 August	Denmark Masters: Host: Esbjerg, Denmark; Venue: Blue Water Dokken; Level: International Challenge; Prize: $25,000; Format: 32MS/32WS/32MD/32WD/32XD	(Denmark) Amalie Magelund (Denmark) Freja Ravn	(India) Ashwini Ponnappa (India) N. Sikki Reddy
2 August	Denmark Masters: Host: Esbjerg, Denmark; Venue: Blue Water Dokken; Level: International Challenge; Prize: $25,000; Format: 32MS/32WS/32MD/32WD/32XD	Score: 15–21, 21–19, 21–14	
2 August	Denmark Masters: Host: Esbjerg, Denmark; Venue: Blue Water Dokken; Level: International Challenge; Prize: $25,000; Format: 32MS/32WS/32MD/32WD/32XD	(Denmark) Jeppe Bay (Denmark) Sara Lundgaard	(Denmark) Niclas Nøhr (Denmark) Amalie Magelund
2 August	Denmark Masters: Host: Esbjerg, Denmark; Venue: Blue Water Dokken; Level: International Challenge; Prize: $25,000; Format: 32MS/32WS/32MD/32WD/32XD	Score: 21–15, 21–14	
9 August	Malaysia International Series (cancelled) (Note: Tournament cancelled due to the COVID-19 pandemic on 12 July 2021.): Host: Kuala Lumpur, Malaysia; Venue: TBD; Level: International Series; Prize: $10,000; Format: TBD		
9 August	Malaysia International Series (cancelled): Host: Kuala Lumpur, Malaysia; Venue: TBD; Level: International Series; Prize: $10,000; Format: TBD	Score:	
9 August	Malaysia International Series (cancelled): Host: Kuala Lumpur, Malaysia; Venue: TBD; Level: International Series; Prize: $10,000; Format: TBD	Score:	
9 August	Malaysia International Series (cancelled): Host: Kuala Lumpur, Malaysia; Venue: TBD; Level: International Series; Prize: $10,000; Format: TBD	Score:	
9 August	Malaysia International Series (cancelled): Host: Kuala Lumpur, Malaysia; Venue: TBD; Level: International Series; Prize: $10,000; Format: TBD	Score:	
9 August	Malaysia International Series (cancelled): Host: Kuala Lumpur, Malaysia; Venue: TBD; Level: International Series; Prize: $10,000; Format: TBD	Score:	
9 August	Bulgarian Open (cancelled) (Note: Tournament cancelled due to the COVID-19 pandemic on 26 June 2021.): Host: Sofia, Bulgaria; Venue: Badminton Hall "Europe"; Level: International Series; Prize: $10,000; Format: TBD		
9 August	Bulgarian Open (cancelled): Host: Sofia, Bulgaria; Venue: Badminton Hall "Europe"; Level: International Series; Prize: $10,000; Format: TBD	Score:	
9 August	Bulgarian Open (cancelled): Host: Sofia, Bulgaria; Venue: Badminton Hall "Europe"; Level: International Series; Prize: $10,000; Format: TBD	Score:	
9 August	Bulgarian Open (cancelled): Host: Sofia, Bulgaria; Venue: Badminton Hall "Europe"; Level: International Series; Prize: $10,000; Format: TBD	Score:	
9 August	Bulgarian Open (cancelled): Host: Sofia, Bulgaria; Venue: Badminton Hall "Europe"; Level: International Series; Prize: $10,000; Format: TBD	Score:	
9 August	Bulgarian Open (cancelled): Host: Sofia, Bulgaria; Venue: Badminton Hall "Europe"; Level: International Series; Prize: $10,000; Format: TBD	Score:	
16 August	Akita Masters (Draw) (cancelled): Host: Akita, Akita Prefecture, Japan; Venue: CNA Arena Akita; Level: Super 100; Prize: $100,000; Format: 48MS/32WS/32MD/32WD/32XD		
16 August	Akita Masters (Draw) (cancelled): Host: Akita, Akita Prefecture, Japan; Venue: CNA Arena Akita; Level: Super 100; Prize: $100,000; Format: 48MS/32WS/32MD/32WD/32XD	Score:	
16 August	Akita Masters (Draw) (cancelled): Host: Akita, Akita Prefecture, Japan; Venue: CNA Arena Akita; Level: Super 100; Prize: $100,000; Format: 48MS/32WS/32MD/32WD/32XD	Score:	
16 August	Akita Masters (Draw) (cancelled): Host: Akita, Akita Prefecture, Japan; Venue: CNA Arena Akita; Level: Super 100; Prize: $100,000; Format: 48MS/32WS/32MD/32WD/32XD	Score:	
16 August	Akita Masters (Draw) (cancelled): Host: Akita, Akita Prefecture, Japan; Venue: CNA Arena Akita; Level: Super 100; Prize: $100,000; Format: 48MS/32WS/32MD/32WD/32XD	Score:	
16 August	Akita Masters (Draw) (cancelled): Host: Akita, Akita Prefecture, Japan; Venue: CNA Arena Akita; Level: Super 100; Prize: $100,000; Format: 48MS/32WS/32MD/32WD/32XD	Score:	
16 August	Benin International: Host: Cotonou, Benin; Venue: Stade de l’Amitié Général Mathieu Kérékou; Level: Future Series; Format: 32MS/32WS/32MD/16WD/32XD	(India) Farogh Sanjay Aman	(Kazakhstan) Dmitriy Panarin
16 August	Benin International: Host: Cotonou, Benin; Venue: Stade de l’Amitié Général Mathieu Kérékou; Level: Future Series; Format: 32MS/32WS/32MD/16WD/32XD	Score: 21–13, 21–17	
16 August	Benin International: Host: Cotonou, Benin; Venue: Stade de l’Amitié Général Mathieu Kérékou; Level: Future Series; Format: 32MS/32WS/32MD/16WD/32XD	(South Africa) Johanita Scholtz	(South Africa) Deidre Laurens Jordaan
16 August	Benin International: Host: Cotonou, Benin; Venue: Stade de l’Amitié Général Mathieu Kérékou; Level: Future Series; Format: 32MS/32WS/32MD/16WD/32XD	Score: 21–11, 21–10	
16 August	Benin International: Host: Cotonou, Benin; Venue: Stade de l’Amitié Général Mathieu Kérékou; Level: Future Series; Format: 32MS/32WS/32MD/16WD/32XD	(Nigeria) Gideon Babalola (Nigeria) Habeeb Temitope Bello	(South Africa) Daniel Steyn (South Africa) Bongani von Bodenstein
16 August	Benin International: Host: Cotonou, Benin; Venue: Stade de l’Amitié Général Mathieu Kérékou; Level: Future Series; Format: 32MS/32WS/32MD/16WD/32XD	Score: 21–18, 21–17	
16 August	Benin International: Host: Cotonou, Benin; Venue: Stade de l’Amitié Général Mathieu Kérékou; Level: Future Series; Format: 32MS/32WS/32MD/16WD/32XD	(South Africa) Demi Botha (South Africa) Deidre Laurens Jordaan	(South Africa) Amy Ackerman (South Africa) Diane Olivier
16 August	Benin International: Host: Cotonou, Benin; Venue: Stade de l’Amitié Général Mathieu Kérékou; Level: Future Series; Format: 32MS/32WS/32MD/16WD/32XD	Score: 21–16, 21–19	
16 August	Benin International: Host: Cotonou, Benin; Venue: Stade de l’Amitié Général Mathieu Kérékou; Level: Future Series; Format: 32MS/32WS/32MD/16WD/32XD	(South Africa) Jarred Elliott (South Africa) Deidre Laurens Jordaan	(South Africa) Cameron Coetzer (South Africa) Amy Ackerman
16 August	Benin International: Host: Cotonou, Benin; Venue: Stade de l’Amitié Général Mathieu Kérékou; Level: Future Series; Format: 32MS/32WS/32MD/16WD/32XD	Score: 21–17, 22–20	
23 August	Hyderabad Open (Draw) (cancelled) (Note: Tournament cancelled due to the COVID-19 pandemic on 28 June 2021.): Host: Hyderabad, India; Venue: TBD; Level: Super 100; Prize: $100,000; Format: 48MS/32WS/32MD/32WD/32XD		
23 August	Hyderabad Open (Draw) (cancelled): Host: Hyderabad, India; Venue: TBD; Level: Super 100; Prize: $100,000; Format: 48MS/32WS/32MD/32WD/32XD	Score:	
23 August	Hyderabad Open (Draw) (cancelled): Host: Hyderabad, India; Venue: TBD; Level: Super 100; Prize: $100,000; Format: 48MS/32WS/32MD/32WD/32XD	Score:	
23 August	Hyderabad Open (Draw) (cancelled): Host: Hyderabad, India; Venue: TBD; Level: Super 100; Prize: $100,000; Format: 48MS/32WS/32MD/32WD/32XD	Score:	
23 August	Hyderabad Open (Draw) (cancelled): Host: Hyderabad, India; Venue: TBD; Level: Super 100; Prize: $100,000; Format: 48MS/32WS/32MD/32WD/32XD	Score:	
23 August	Hyderabad Open (Draw) (cancelled): Host: Hyderabad, India; Venue: TBD; Level: Super 100; Prize: $100,000; Format: 48MS/32WS/32MD/32WD/32XD	Score:	
23 August	Latvia International: Host: Jelgava, Latvia; Venue: Zemgales Olimpiskais centrs; Level: Future Series; Format: 32MS/32WS/32MD/32WD/32XD	(India) Meiraba Luwang	(France) Alex Lanier
23 August	Latvia International: Host: Jelgava, Latvia; Venue: Zemgales Olimpiskais centrs; Level: Future Series; Format: 32MS/32WS/32MD/32WD/32XD	Score: 21–15, 12–21, 22–20	
23 August	Latvia International: Host: Jelgava, Latvia; Venue: Zemgales Olimpiskais centrs; Level: Future Series; Format: 32MS/32WS/32MD/32WD/32XD	(Ukraine) Polina Buhrova	(Ukraine) Mariia Stoliarenko
23 August	Latvia International: Host: Jelgava, Latvia; Venue: Zemgales Olimpiskais centrs; Level: Future Series; Format: 32MS/32WS/32MD/32WD/32XD	Score: 21–13, 21–16	
23 August	Latvia International: Host: Jelgava, Latvia; Venue: Zemgales Olimpiskais centrs; Level: Future Series; Format: 32MS/32WS/32MD/32WD/32XD	(Malaysia) Muhammad Nurfirdaus Azman (Malaysia) Yap Roy King	(Malaysia) Junaidi Arif (Malaysia) Muhammad Haikal
23 August	Latvia International: Host: Jelgava, Latvia; Venue: Zemgales Olimpiskais centrs; Level: Future Series; Format: 32MS/32WS/32MD/32WD/32XD	Score: 21–23, 21–15, 21–19	
23 August	Latvia International: Host: Jelgava, Latvia; Venue: Zemgales Olimpiskais centrs; Level: Future Series; Format: 32MS/32WS/32MD/32WD/32XD	(Malaysia) Low Yeen Yuan (Malaysia) Valeree Siow	(Italy) Martina Corsini (Italy) Judith Mair
23 August	Latvia International: Host: Jelgava, Latvia; Venue: Zemgales Olimpiskais centrs; Level: Future Series; Format: 32MS/32WS/32MD/32WD/32XD	Score: 21–7, 21–17	
23 August	Latvia International: Host: Jelgava, Latvia; Venue: Zemgales Olimpiskais centrs; Level: Future Series; Format: 32MS/32WS/32MD/32WD/32XD	(Malaysia) Yap Roy King (Malaysia) Valeree Siow	(Malaysia) Muhammad Nurfirdaus Azman (Malaysia) Low Yeen Yuan
23 August	Latvia International: Host: Jelgava, Latvia; Venue: Zemgales Olimpiskais centrs; Level: Future Series; Format: 32MS/32WS/32MD/32WD/32XD	Score: 22–20, 21–15	
30 August	Korea Open (Draw) (cancelled) (Note: Tournament cancelled due to the COVID-19 pandemic on 11 August 2021.): Host: Yeosu City, South Korea; Venue: Jinnam Indoor Stadium; Level: Super 500; Prize: $320,000; Format: 32MS/32WS/32MD/32WD/32XD		
30 August	Korea Open (Draw) (cancelled): Host: Yeosu City, South Korea; Venue: Jinnam Indoor Stadium; Level: Super 500; Prize: $320,000; Format: 32MS/32WS/32MD/32WD/32XD	Score:	
30 August	Korea Open (Draw) (cancelled): Host: Yeosu City, South Korea; Venue: Jinnam Indoor Stadium; Level: Super 500; Prize: $320,000; Format: 32MS/32WS/32MD/32WD/32XD	Score:	
30 August	Korea Open (Draw) (cancelled): Host: Yeosu City, South Korea; Venue: Jinnam Indoor Stadium; Level: Super 500; Prize: $320,000; Format: 32MS/32WS/32MD/32WD/32XD	Score:	
30 August	Korea Open (Draw) (cancelled): Host: Yeosu City, South Korea; Venue: Jinnam Indoor Stadium; Level: Super 500; Prize: $320,000; Format: 32MS/32WS/32MD/32WD/32XD	Score:	
30 August	Korea Open (Draw) (cancelled): Host: Yeosu City, South Korea; Venue: Jinnam Indoor Stadium; Level: Super 500; Prize: $320,000; Format: 32MS/32WS/32MD/32WD/32XD	Score:	
30 August	Mexican International Challenge: Host: Aguascalientes City, Mexico; Venue: Gimnasio Olímpico; Level: International Challenge; Prize: $15,000; Format: 32MS/32WS/32MD/8WD/32XD	(Spain) Luís Enrique Peñalver	(Mexico) Luis Montoya
30 August	Mexican International Challenge: Host: Aguascalientes City, Mexico; Venue: Gimnasio Olímpico; Level: International Challenge; Prize: $15,000; Format: 32MS/32WS/32MD/8WD/32XD	Score: 21–10, 21–12	
30 August	Mexican International Challenge: Host: Aguascalientes City, Mexico; Venue: Gimnasio Olímpico; Level: International Challenge; Prize: $15,000; Format: 32MS/32WS/32MD/8WD/32XD	(Spain) Beatriz Corrales	(Spain) Clara Azurmendi
30 August	Mexican International Challenge: Host: Aguascalientes City, Mexico; Venue: Gimnasio Olímpico; Level: International Challenge; Prize: $15,000; Format: 32MS/32WS/32MD/8WD/32XD	Score: 21–18, 21–17	
30 August	Mexican International Challenge: Host: Aguascalientes City, Mexico; Venue: Gimnasio Olímpico; Level: International Challenge; Prize: $15,000; Format: 32MS/32WS/32MD/8WD/32XD	(Mexico) Job Castillo (Mexico) Luis Montoya	(United States) Enrico Asuncion (United States) Vinson Chiu
30 August	Mexican International Challenge: Host: Aguascalientes City, Mexico; Venue: Gimnasio Olímpico; Level: International Challenge; Prize: $15,000; Format: 32MS/32WS/32MD/8WD/32XD	Score: 21–16, 21–14	
30 August	Mexican International Challenge: Host: Aguascalientes City, Mexico; Venue: Gimnasio Olímpico; Level: International Challenge; Prize: $15,000; Format: 32MS/32WS/32MD/8WD/32XD	(Spain) Clara Azurmendi (Spain) Beatriz Corrales	(Spain) Lucía Rodríguez (Spain) Ania Setién
30 August	Mexican International Challenge: Host: Aguascalientes City, Mexico; Venue: Gimnasio Olímpico; Level: International Challenge; Prize: $15,000; Format: 32MS/32WS/32MD/8WD/32XD	Score: 23–21, 12–21, 22–20	
30 August	Mexican International Challenge: Host: Aguascalientes City, Mexico; Venue: Gimnasio Olímpico; Level: International Challenge; Prize: $15,000; Format: 32MS/32WS/32MD/8WD/32XD	(United States) Vinson Chiu (United States) Jennie Gai	(Mexico) Luis Montoya (Mexico) Vanessa Villalobos
30 August	Mexican International Challenge: Host: Aguascalientes City, Mexico; Venue: Gimnasio Olímpico; Level: International Challenge; Prize: $15,000; Format: 32MS/32WS/32MD/8WD/32XD	Score: 21–17, 21–18	
30 August	Hellas International: Host: Lavrio, Greece; Venue: Lavrio Gym Stadium; Level: Future Series; Format: 32MS/32WS/32MD/16WD/32XD	(Malaysia) Lee Shun Yang	(Czech Republic) Jan Louda
30 August	Hellas International: Host: Lavrio, Greece; Venue: Lavrio Gym Stadium; Level: Future Series; Format: 32MS/32WS/32MD/16WD/32XD	Score: 21–14, 24–22	
30 August	Hellas International: Host: Lavrio, Greece; Venue: Lavrio Gym Stadium; Level: Future Series; Format: 32MS/32WS/32MD/16WD/32XD	(England) Abigail Holden	(Hungary) Vivien Sándorházi
30 August	Hellas International: Host: Lavrio, Greece; Venue: Lavrio Gym Stadium; Level: Future Series; Format: 32MS/32WS/32MD/16WD/32XD	Score: 18–21, 21–15, 21–14	
30 August	Hellas International: Host: Lavrio, Greece; Venue: Lavrio Gym Stadium; Level: Future Series; Format: 32MS/32WS/32MD/16WD/32XD	(Malaysia) Junaidi Arif (Malaysia) Muhammad Haikal	(Czech Republic) Ondřej Král (Czech Republic) Adam Mendrek
30 August	Hellas International: Host: Lavrio, Greece; Venue: Lavrio Gym Stadium; Level: Future Series; Format: 32MS/32WS/32MD/16WD/32XD	Score: 21–16, 21–15	
30 August	Hellas International: Host: Lavrio, Greece; Venue: Lavrio Gym Stadium; Level: Future Series; Format: 32MS/32WS/32MD/16WD/32XD	(Malaysia) Low Yeen Yuan (Malaysia) Valeree Siow	(Italy) Katharina Fink (Italy) Yasmine Hamza
30 August	Hellas International: Host: Lavrio, Greece; Venue: Lavrio Gym Stadium; Level: Future Series; Format: 32MS/32WS/32MD/16WD/32XD	Score: 21–15, 21–16	
30 August	Hellas International: Host: Lavrio, Greece; Venue: Lavrio Gym Stadium; Level: Future Series; Format: 32MS/32WS/32MD/16WD/32XD	(Malaysia) Yap Roy King (Malaysia) Valeree Siow	(Norway) Carl Christian Mork (Norway) Solvår Flåten Jørgensen
30 August	Hellas International: Host: Lavrio, Greece; Venue: Lavrio Gym Stadium; Level: Future Series; Format: 32MS/32WS/32MD/16WD/32XD	Score: 21–13, 21–17	

=== September ===
Week commencing	Tournament	Champions	Runners-up
6 September	Taipei Open (Draw) (cancelled) (Note: Tournament cancelled due to the COVID-19 pandemic in Taiwan on 14 August 2021.): Host: Taipei, Taiwan; Venue: Taipei Arena; Level: Super 300; Prize: $500,000; Format: 32MS/32WS/32MD/32WD/32XD		
6 September	Taipei Open (Draw) (cancelled): Host: Taipei, Taiwan; Venue: Taipei Arena; Level: Super 300; Prize: $500,000; Format: 32MS/32WS/32MD/32WD/32XD	Score:	
6 September	Taipei Open (Draw) (cancelled): Host: Taipei, Taiwan; Venue: Taipei Arena; Level: Super 300; Prize: $500,000; Format: 32MS/32WS/32MD/32WD/32XD	Score:	
6 September	Taipei Open (Draw) (cancelled): Host: Taipei, Taiwan; Venue: Taipei Arena; Level: Super 300; Prize: $500,000; Format: 32MS/32WS/32MD/32WD/32XD	Score:	
6 September	Taipei Open (Draw) (cancelled): Host: Taipei, Taiwan; Venue: Taipei Arena; Level: Super 300; Prize: $500,000; Format: 32MS/32WS/32MD/32WD/32XD	Score:	
6 September	Taipei Open (Draw) (cancelled): Host: Taipei, Taiwan; Venue: Taipei Arena; Level: Super 300; Prize: $500,000; Format: 32MS/32WS/32MD/32WD/32XD	Score:	
6 September	Kathmandu International (cancelled) (Note: Tournament cancelled due to the COVID-19 pandemic on 26 May 2021.): Host: Kathmandu, Nepal; Venue: Dashrath Stadium; Level: International Series; Prize: $7,500; Format: TBD		
6 September	Kathmandu International (cancelled): Host: Kathmandu, Nepal; Venue: Dashrath Stadium; Level: International Series; Prize: $7,500; Format: TBD	Score:	
6 September	Kathmandu International (cancelled): Host: Kathmandu, Nepal; Venue: Dashrath Stadium; Level: International Series; Prize: $7,500; Format: TBD	Score:	
6 September	Kathmandu International (cancelled): Host: Kathmandu, Nepal; Venue: Dashrath Stadium; Level: International Series; Prize: $7,500; Format: TBD	Score:	
6 September	Kathmandu International (cancelled): Host: Kathmandu, Nepal; Venue: Dashrath Stadium; Level: International Series; Prize: $7,500; Format: TBD	Score:	
6 September	Kathmandu International (cancelled): Host: Kathmandu, Nepal; Venue: Dashrath Stadium; Level: International Series; Prize: $7,500; Format: TBD	Score:	
6 September	Ukraine International: Host: Kharkiv, Ukraine; Venue: Lokomotyv Sports Palace; Level: International Series; Prize: $5,000; Format: 32MS/32WS/32MD/16WD/32XD	(India) Priyanshu Rajawat	(India) Sathish Kumar Karunakaran
6 September	Ukraine International: Host: Kharkiv, Ukraine; Venue: Lokomotyv Sports Palace; Level: International Series; Prize: $5,000; Format: 32MS/32WS/32MD/16WD/32XD	Score: 21–17, 21–18	
6 September	Ukraine International: Host: Kharkiv, Ukraine; Venue: Lokomotyv Sports Palace; Level: International Series; Prize: $5,000; Format: 32MS/32WS/32MD/16WD/32XD	(Ukraine) Polina Buhrova	(Switzerland) Dounia Pelupessy
6 September	Ukraine International: Host: Kharkiv, Ukraine; Venue: Lokomotyv Sports Palace; Level: International Series; Prize: $5,000; Format: 32MS/32WS/32MD/16WD/32XD	Score: 21–17, 21–12	
6 September	Ukraine International: Host: Kharkiv, Ukraine; Venue: Lokomotyv Sports Palace; Level: International Series; Prize: $5,000; Format: 32MS/32WS/32MD/16WD/32XD	(Malaysia) Junaidi Arif (Malaysia) Muhammad Haikal	(India) Ishaan Bhatnagar (India) K. Sai Pratheek
6 September	Ukraine International: Host: Kharkiv, Ukraine; Venue: Lokomotyv Sports Palace; Level: International Series; Prize: $5,000; Format: 32MS/32WS/32MD/16WD/32XD	Score: 21–15, 19–21, 21–15	
6 September	Ukraine International: Host: Kharkiv, Ukraine; Venue: Lokomotyv Sports Palace; Level: International Series; Prize: $5,000; Format: 32MS/32WS/32MD/16WD/32XD	(Germany) Stine Küspert (Germany) Emma Moszczynski	(Ukraine) Mariia Stoliarenko (Ukraine) Yelyzaveta Zharka
6 September	Ukraine International: Host: Kharkiv, Ukraine; Venue: Lokomotyv Sports Palace; Level: International Series; Prize: $5,000; Format: 32MS/32WS/32MD/16WD/32XD	Score: 21–18, 19–21, 21–15	
6 September	Ukraine International: Host: Kharkiv, Ukraine; Venue: Lokomotyv Sports Palace; Level: International Series; Prize: $5,000; Format: 32MS/32WS/32MD/16WD/32XD	(Malaysia) Yap Roy King (Malaysia) Valeree Siow	(Germany) Johannes Pistorius (Germany) Emma Moszczynski
6 September	Ukraine International: Host: Kharkiv, Ukraine; Venue: Lokomotyv Sports Palace; Level: International Series; Prize: $5,000; Format: 32MS/32WS/32MD/16WD/32XD	Score: 21–19, 21–12	
6 September	Brazil International Series: Host: Teresina, Piauí, Brazil; Venue: TBD; Level: International Series; Prize: $5,000; Format: 32MS/32WS/32MD/8WD/32XD	(Brazil) Jonathan Matias	(Brazil) Donnians Oliveira
6 September	Brazil International Series: Host: Teresina, Piauí, Brazil; Venue: TBD; Level: International Series; Prize: $5,000; Format: 32MS/32WS/32MD/8WD/32XD	Score: 20–22, 21–15, 21–18	
6 September	Brazil International Series: Host: Teresina, Piauí, Brazil; Venue: TBD; Level: International Series; Prize: $5,000; Format: 32MS/32WS/32MD/8WD/32XD	(Brazil) Juliana Viana Vieira	(Brazil) Jaqueline Lima
6 September	Brazil International Series: Host: Teresina, Piauí, Brazil; Venue: TBD; Level: International Series; Prize: $5,000; Format: 32MS/32WS/32MD/8WD/32XD	Score: 14–21, 25–23, 21–15	
6 September	Brazil International Series: Host: Teresina, Piauí, Brazil; Venue: TBD; Level: International Series; Prize: $5,000; Format: 32MS/32WS/32MD/8WD/32XD	(Brazil) Fabrício Farias (Brazil) Francielton Farias	(Brazil) Izak Batalha (Brazil) Artur Silva Pomoceno
6 September	Brazil International Series: Host: Teresina, Piauí, Brazil; Venue: TBD; Level: International Series; Prize: $5,000; Format: 32MS/32WS/32MD/8WD/32XD	Score: 21–18, 21–10	
6 September	Brazil International Series: Host: Teresina, Piauí, Brazil; Venue: TBD; Level: International Series; Prize: $5,000; Format: 32MS/32WS/32MD/8WD/32XD	(Brazil) Jaqueline Lima (Brazil) Sâmia Lima	(Brazil) Sania Lima (Brazil) Julia Viana Vieira
6 September	Brazil International Series: Host: Teresina, Piauí, Brazil; Venue: TBD; Level: International Series; Prize: $5,000; Format: 32MS/32WS/32MD/8WD/32XD	Score: 15–21, 21–14, 21–17	
6 September	Brazil International Series: Host: Teresina, Piauí, Brazil; Venue: TBD; Level: International Series; Prize: $5,000; Format: 32MS/32WS/32MD/8WD/32XD	(Brazil) Fabrício Farias (Brazil) Jaqueline Lima	(Brazil) Artur Silva Pomoceno (Brazil) Sâmia Lima
6 September	Brazil International Series: Host: Teresina, Piauí, Brazil; Venue: TBD; Level: International Series; Prize: $5,000; Format: 32MS/32WS/32MD/8WD/32XD	Score: 21–19, 21–12	
13 September	Vietnam Open (Draw) (cancelled) (Note: Tournament cancelled due to the COVID-19 pandemic on 28 June 2021.): Host: Ho Chi Minh City, Vietnam; Venue: TBD; Level: Super 100; Prize: $100,000; Format: 48MS/32WS/32MD/32WD/32XD		
13 September	Vietnam Open (Draw) (cancelled): Host: Ho Chi Minh City, Vietnam; Venue: TBD; Level: Super 100; Prize: $100,000; Format: 48MS/32WS/32MD/32WD/32XD	Score:	
13 September	Vietnam Open (Draw) (cancelled): Host: Ho Chi Minh City, Vietnam; Venue: TBD; Level: Super 100; Prize: $100,000; Format: 48MS/32WS/32MD/32WD/32XD	Score:	
13 September	Vietnam Open (Draw) (cancelled): Host: Ho Chi Minh City, Vietnam; Venue: TBD; Level: Super 100; Prize: $100,000; Format: 48MS/32WS/32MD/32WD/32XD	Score:	
13 September	Vietnam Open (Draw) (cancelled): Host: Ho Chi Minh City, Vietnam; Venue: TBD; Level: Super 100; Prize: $100,000; Format: 48MS/32WS/32MD/32WD/32XD	Score:	
13 September	Vietnam Open (Draw) (cancelled): Host: Ho Chi Minh City, Vietnam; Venue: TBD; Level: Super 100; Prize: $100,000; Format: 48MS/32WS/32MD/32WD/32XD	Score:	
13 September	Bendigo International (cancelled) (Note: Tournament cancelled due to the COVID-19 pandemic on 10 June 2021.): Host: Bendigo, Australia; Venue: Bendigo Stadium; Level: International Challenge; Prize: $15,000; Format: TBD		
13 September	Bendigo International (cancelled): Host: Bendigo, Australia; Venue: Bendigo Stadium; Level: International Challenge; Prize: $15,000; Format: TBD	Score:	
13 September	Bendigo International (cancelled): Host: Bendigo, Australia; Venue: Bendigo Stadium; Level: International Challenge; Prize: $15,000; Format: TBD	Score:	
13 September	Bendigo International (cancelled): Host: Bendigo, Australia; Venue: Bendigo Stadium; Level: International Challenge; Prize: $15,000; Format: TBD	Score:	
13 September	Bendigo International (cancelled): Host: Bendigo, Australia; Venue: Bendigo Stadium; Level: International Challenge; Prize: $15,000; Format: TBD	Score:	
13 September	Bendigo International (cancelled): Host: Bendigo, Australia; Venue: Bendigo Stadium; Level: International Challenge; Prize: $15,000; Format: TBD	Score:	
13 September	Finnish Open (cancelled) (Note: Tournament cancelled due to the COVID-19 pandemic on 12 July 2021.): Host: Vantaa, Finland; Venue: Energia Areena; Level: International Series; Prize: $7,000; Format: 32MS/32WS/32MD/32WD/32XD		
13 September	Finnish Open (cancelled): Host: Vantaa, Finland; Venue: Energia Areena; Level: International Series; Prize: $7,000; Format: 32MS/32WS/32MD/32WD/32XD	Score:	
13 September	Finnish Open (cancelled): Host: Vantaa, Finland; Venue: Energia Areena; Level: International Series; Prize: $7,000; Format: 32MS/32WS/32MD/32WD/32XD	Score:	
13 September	Finnish Open (cancelled): Host: Vantaa, Finland; Venue: Energia Areena; Level: International Series; Prize: $7,000; Format: 32MS/32WS/32MD/32WD/32XD	Score:	
13 September	Finnish Open (cancelled): Host: Vantaa, Finland; Venue: Energia Areena; Level: International Series; Prize: $7,000; Format: 32MS/32WS/32MD/32WD/32XD	Score:	
13 September	Finnish Open (cancelled): Host: Vantaa, Finland; Venue: Energia Areena; Level: International Series; Prize: $7,000; Format: 32MS/32WS/32MD/32WD/32XD	Score:	
20 September	China Open (Draw) (cancelled): Host: Changzhou, China; Venue: Olympic Sports Center Xincheng Gymnasium; Level: Super 1000; Prize: $1,100,000; Format: 32MS/32WS/32MD/32WD/32XD		
20 September	China Open (Draw) (cancelled): Host: Changzhou, China; Venue: Olympic Sports Center Xincheng Gymnasium; Level: Super 1000; Prize: $1,100,000; Format: 32MS/32WS/32MD/32WD/32XD	Score:	
20 September	China Open (Draw) (cancelled): Host: Changzhou, China; Venue: Olympic Sports Center Xincheng Gymnasium; Level: Super 1000; Prize: $1,100,000; Format: 32MS/32WS/32MD/32WD/32XD	Score:	
20 September	China Open (Draw) (cancelled): Host: Changzhou, China; Venue: Olympic Sports Center Xincheng Gymnasium; Level: Super 1000; Prize: $1,100,000; Format: 32MS/32WS/32MD/32WD/32XD	Score:	
20 September	China Open (Draw) (cancelled): Host: Changzhou, China; Venue: Olympic Sports Center Xincheng Gymnasium; Level: Super 1000; Prize: $1,100,000; Format: 32MS/32WS/32MD/32WD/32XD	Score:	
20 September	China Open (Draw) (cancelled): Host: Changzhou, China; Venue: Olympic Sports Center Xincheng Gymnasium; Level: Super 1000; Prize: $1,100,000; Format: 32MS/32WS/32MD/32WD/32XD	Score:	
20 September	Sydney International (cancelled): Host: Sydney, Australia; Venue: Sydney Olympic Park; Level: International Series; Prize: $5,000; Format: TBD		
20 September	Sydney International (cancelled): Host: Sydney, Australia; Venue: Sydney Olympic Park; Level: International Series; Prize: $5,000; Format: TBD	Score:	
20 September	Sydney International (cancelled): Host: Sydney, Australia; Venue: Sydney Olympic Park; Level: International Series; Prize: $5,000; Format: TBD	Score:	
20 September	Sydney International (cancelled): Host: Sydney, Australia; Venue: Sydney Olympic Park; Level: International Series; Prize: $5,000; Format: TBD	Score:	
20 September	Sydney International (cancelled): Host: Sydney, Australia; Venue: Sydney Olympic Park; Level: International Series; Prize: $5,000; Format: TBD	Score:	
20 September	Sydney International (cancelled): Host: Sydney, Australia; Venue: Sydney Olympic Park; Level: International Series; Prize: $5,000; Format: TBD	Score:	
20 September	Polish International: Host: Zakopane, Poland; Venue: Zespół Szkół Mistrzostwa Sportowego w Zakopanem; Level: International Series; Prize: $5,000; Format: 32MS/32WS/32MD/32WD/32XD	(India) Kiran George	(Singapore) Jason Teh
20 September	Polish International: Host: Zakopane, Poland; Venue: Zespół Szkół Mistrzostwa Sportowego w Zakopanem; Level: International Series; Prize: $5,000; Format: 32MS/32WS/32MD/32WD/32XD	Score: 13–21, 21–14, 21–13	
20 September	Polish International: Host: Zakopane, Poland; Venue: Zespół Szkół Mistrzostwa Sportowego w Zakopanem; Level: International Series; Prize: $5,000; Format: 32MS/32WS/32MD/32WD/32XD	(Singapore) Jaslyn Hooi	(India) Samiya Imad Farooqui
20 September	Polish International: Host: Zakopane, Poland; Venue: Zespół Szkół Mistrzostwa Sportowego w Zakopanem; Level: International Series; Prize: $5,000; Format: 32MS/32WS/32MD/32WD/32XD	Score: 21–11, 21–9	
20 September	Polish International: Host: Zakopane, Poland; Venue: Zespół Szkół Mistrzostwa Sportowego w Zakopanem; Level: International Series; Prize: $5,000; Format: 32MS/32WS/32MD/32WD/32XD	(India) Ishaan Bhatnagar (India) K. Sai Pratheek	(England) Rory Easton (England) Zach Russ
20 September	Polish International: Host: Zakopane, Poland; Venue: Zespół Szkół Mistrzostwa Sportowego w Zakopanem; Level: International Series; Prize: $5,000; Format: 32MS/32WS/32MD/32WD/32XD	Score: 21–18, 27–25	
20 September	Polish International: Host: Zakopane, Poland; Venue: Zespół Szkół Mistrzostwa Sportowego w Zakopanem; Level: International Series; Prize: $5,000; Format: 32MS/32WS/32MD/32WD/32XD	(France) Margot Lambert (France) Anne Tran	(India) Treesa Jolly (India) Gayathri Gopichand
20 September	Polish International: Host: Zakopane, Poland; Venue: Zespół Szkół Mistrzostwa Sportowego w Zakopanem; Level: International Series; Prize: $5,000; Format: 32MS/32WS/32MD/32WD/32XD	Score: 21–10, 21–18	
20 September	Polish International: Host: Zakopane, Poland; Venue: Zespół Szkół Mistrzostwa Sportowego w Zakopanem; Level: International Series; Prize: $5,000; Format: 32MS/32WS/32MD/32WD/32XD	(France) William Villeger (France) Anne Tran	(Poland) Paweł Śmiłowski (Poland) Wiktoria Adamek
20 September	Polish International: Host: Zakopane, Poland; Venue: Zespół Szkół Mistrzostwa Sportowego w Zakopanem; Level: International Series; Prize: $5,000; Format: 32MS/32WS/32MD/32WD/32XD	Score: 21–15, 21–17	
20 September	Guatemala International Series: Host: Guatemala City, Guatemala; Venue: Gimnasio Teodoro Palacios Flores; Level: International Series; Prize: $10,000; Format: 32MS/16WS/8MD/8WD/16XD	(Guatemala) Kevin Cordón	(Canada) Victor Lai
20 September	Guatemala International Series: Host: Guatemala City, Guatemala; Venue: Gimnasio Teodoro Palacios Flores; Level: International Series; Prize: $10,000; Format: 32MS/16WS/8MD/8WD/16XD	Score: 21–13, 21–11	
20 September	Guatemala International Series: Host: Guatemala City, Guatemala; Venue: Gimnasio Teodoro Palacios Flores; Level: International Series; Prize: $10,000; Format: 32MS/16WS/8MD/8WD/16XD	(United States) Jennie Gai	(India) Samayara Panwar
20 September	Guatemala International Series: Host: Guatemala City, Guatemala; Venue: Gimnasio Teodoro Palacios Flores; Level: International Series; Prize: $10,000; Format: 32MS/16WS/8MD/8WD/16XD	Score: 21–6, 21–9	
20 September	Guatemala International Series: Host: Guatemala City, Guatemala; Venue: Gimnasio Teodoro Palacios Flores; Level: International Series; Prize: $10,000; Format: 32MS/16WS/8MD/8WD/16XD	(Canada) Kevin Lee (Canada) Ty Alexander Lindeman	(Guatemala) Jonathan Solís (Guatemala) Aníbal Marroquín
20 September	Guatemala International Series: Host: Guatemala City, Guatemala; Venue: Gimnasio Teodoro Palacios Flores; Level: International Series; Prize: $10,000; Format: 32MS/16WS/8MD/8WD/16XD	Score: 19–21, 21–17, 21–10	
20 September	Guatemala International Series: Host: Guatemala City, Guatemala; Venue: Gimnasio Teodoro Palacios Flores; Level: International Series; Prize: $10,000; Format: 32MS/16WS/8MD/8WD/16XD	(United States) Francesca Corbett (United States) Allison Lee	(Guatemala) Ana Pamela González (Guatemala) Karolina Orellana
20 September	Guatemala International Series: Host: Guatemala City, Guatemala; Venue: Gimnasio Teodoro Palacios Flores; Level: International Series; Prize: $10,000; Format: 32MS/16WS/8MD/8WD/16XD	Score: 21–12, 21–4	
20 September	Guatemala International Series: Host: Guatemala City, Guatemala; Venue: Gimnasio Teodoro Palacios Flores; Level: International Series; Prize: $10,000; Format: 32MS/16WS/8MD/8WD/16XD	(Canada) Ty Alexander Lindeman (Canada) Josephine Wu	(United States) Joshua Yuan (United States) Allison Lee
20 September	Guatemala International Series: Host: Guatemala City, Guatemala; Venue: Gimnasio Teodoro Palacios Flores; Level: International Series; Prize: $10,000; Format: 32MS/16WS/8MD/8WD/16XD	Score: 21–17, 21–8	
27 September	Sudirman Cup (Draw): Host: Vantaa, Finland; Venue: Energia Areena; Level: World Mixed Team Championships; Format: 16 teams	China	Japan
27 September	Sudirman Cup (Draw): Host: Vantaa, Finland; Venue: Energia Areena; Level: World Mixed Team Championships; Format: 16 teams	He Jiting / Zhou Haodong	Takuro Hoki / Yugo Kobayashi
27 September	Sudirman Cup (Draw): Host: Vantaa, Finland; Venue: Energia Areena; Level: World Mixed Team Championships; Format: 16 teams	Chen Yufei	Akane Yamaguchi
27 September	Sudirman Cup (Draw): Host: Vantaa, Finland; Venue: Energia Areena; Level: World Mixed Team Championships; Format: 16 teams	Shi Yuqi	Kento Momota
27 September	Sudirman Cup (Draw): Host: Vantaa, Finland; Venue: Energia Areena; Level: World Mixed Team Championships; Format: 16 teams	Chen Qingchen / Jia Yifan	Mayu Matsumoto / Misaki Matsutomo
27 September	Sudirman Cup (Draw): Host: Vantaa, Finland; Venue: Energia Areena; Level: World Mixed Team Championships; Format: 16 teams	Wang Yilyu / Huang Dongping	Yuta Watanabe / Arisa Higashino
27 September	Sudirman Cup (Draw): Host: Vantaa, Finland; Venue: Energia Areena; Level: World Mixed Team Championships; Format: 16 teams	Score: 3–1	
27 September	Japan Open (Draw) (Cancelled) (cancelled): Host: Tokyo, Japan; Venue: Tokyo Metropolitan Gymnasium; Level: Super 750; Prize: $750,000; Format: 32MS/32WS/32MD/32WD/32XD		
27 September	Japan Open (Draw) (Cancelled) (cancelled): Host: Tokyo, Japan; Venue: Tokyo Metropolitan Gymnasium; Level: Super 750; Prize: $750,000; Format: 32MS/32WS/32MD/32WD/32XD	Score:	
27 September	Japan Open (Draw) (Cancelled) (cancelled): Host: Tokyo, Japan; Venue: Tokyo Metropolitan Gymnasium; Level: Super 750; Prize: $750,000; Format: 32MS/32WS/32MD/32WD/32XD	Score:	
27 September	Japan Open (Draw) (Cancelled) (cancelled): Host: Tokyo, Japan; Venue: Tokyo Metropolitan Gymnasium; Level: Super 750; Prize: $750,000; Format: 32MS/32WS/32MD/32WD/32XD	Score:	
27 September	Japan Open (Draw) (Cancelled) (cancelled): Host: Tokyo, Japan; Venue: Tokyo Metropolitan Gymnasium; Level: Super 750; Prize: $750,000; Format: 32MS/32WS/32MD/32WD/32XD	Score:	
27 September	Japan Open (Draw) (Cancelled) (cancelled): Host: Tokyo, Japan; Venue: Tokyo Metropolitan Gymnasium; Level: Super 750; Prize: $750,000; Format: 32MS/32WS/32MD/32WD/32XD	Score:	
27 September	Mongolia International (cancelled): Host: Ulaanbaatar, Mongolia; Venue: Galkhuu Zulbaatar; Level: International Challenge; Prize: $25,000; Format: TBD		
27 September	Mongolia International (cancelled): Host: Ulaanbaatar, Mongolia; Venue: Galkhuu Zulbaatar; Level: International Challenge; Prize: $25,000; Format: TBD	Score:	
27 September	Mongolia International (cancelled): Host: Ulaanbaatar, Mongolia; Venue: Galkhuu Zulbaatar; Level: International Challenge; Prize: $25,000; Format: TBD	Score:	
27 September	Mongolia International (cancelled): Host: Ulaanbaatar, Mongolia; Venue: Galkhuu Zulbaatar; Level: International Challenge; Prize: $25,000; Format: TBD	Score:	
27 September	Mongolia International (cancelled): Host: Ulaanbaatar, Mongolia; Venue: Galkhuu Zulbaatar; Level: International Challenge; Prize: $25,000; Format: TBD	Score:	
27 September	Mongolia International (cancelled): Host: Ulaanbaatar, Mongolia; Venue: Galkhuu Zulbaatar; Level: International Challenge; Prize: $25,000; Format: TBD	Score:	
27 September	Croatian International (cancelled) (Note: Tournament cancelled due to the COVID-19 pandemic on 24 August 2021.): Host: Zagreb, Croatia; Venue: Dom Sportova; Level: Future Series; Prize: $500; Format: 32MS/32WS/24MD/24WD/24XD		
27 September	Croatian International (cancelled): Host: Zagreb, Croatia; Venue: Dom Sportova; Level: Future Series; Prize: $500; Format: 32MS/32WS/24MD/24WD/24XD	Score:	
27 September	Croatian International (cancelled): Host: Zagreb, Croatia; Venue: Dom Sportova; Level: Future Series; Prize: $500; Format: 32MS/32WS/24MD/24WD/24XD	Score:	
27 September	Croatian International (cancelled): Host: Zagreb, Croatia; Venue: Dom Sportova; Level: Future Series; Prize: $500; Format: 32MS/32WS/24MD/24WD/24XD	Score:	
27 September	Croatian International (cancelled): Host: Zagreb, Croatia; Venue: Dom Sportova; Level: Future Series; Prize: $500; Format: 32MS/32WS/24MD/24WD/24XD	Score:	
27 September	Croatian International (cancelled): Host: Zagreb, Croatia; Venue: Dom Sportova; Level: Future Series; Prize: $500; Format: 32MS/32WS/24MD/24WD/24XD	Score:	

=== October ===
Week commencing	Tournament	Champions	Runners-up
4 October	Indonesia Masters Super 100 (Draw) (cancelled) (Note: This tournament, originally to be played between 5 and 10 October, was later cancelled due to the COVID-19 pandemic in Indonesia.): Host: TBD, Indonesia; Venue: TBD; Level: Super 100; Prize: $90,000; Format: 48MS/32WS/32MD/32WD/32XD		
4 October	Indonesia Masters Super 100 (Draw) (cancelled): Host: TBD, Indonesia; Venue: TBD; Level: Super 100; Prize: $90,000; Format: 48MS/32WS/32MD/32WD/32XD	Score:	
4 October	Indonesia Masters Super 100 (Draw) (cancelled): Host: TBD, Indonesia; Venue: TBD; Level: Super 100; Prize: $90,000; Format: 48MS/32WS/32MD/32WD/32XD	Score:	
4 October	Indonesia Masters Super 100 (Draw) (cancelled): Host: TBD, Indonesia; Venue: TBD; Level: Super 100; Prize: $90,000; Format: 48MS/32WS/32MD/32WD/32XD	Score:	
4 October	Indonesia Masters Super 100 (Draw) (cancelled): Host: TBD, Indonesia; Venue: TBD; Level: Super 100; Prize: $90,000; Format: 48MS/32WS/32MD/32WD/32XD	Score:	
4 October	Indonesia Masters Super 100 (Draw) (cancelled): Host: TBD, Indonesia; Venue: TBD; Level: Super 100; Prize: $90,000; Format: 48MS/32WS/32MD/32WD/32XD	Score:	
4 October	Maldives International Future Series (cancelled) (Note: Tournament cancelled due to the COVID-19 pandemic on 26 June 2021.): Host: Malé, Maldives; Venue: Malé Kulhivaru Ekuveni; Level: Future Series; Format: TBD		
4 October	Maldives International Future Series (cancelled): Host: Malé, Maldives; Venue: Malé Kulhivaru Ekuveni; Level: Future Series; Format: TBD	Score:	
4 October	Maldives International Future Series (cancelled): Host: Malé, Maldives; Venue: Malé Kulhivaru Ekuveni; Level: Future Series; Format: TBD	Score:	
4 October	Maldives International Future Series (cancelled): Host: Malé, Maldives; Venue: Malé Kulhivaru Ekuveni; Level: Future Series; Format: TBD	Score:	
4 October	Maldives International Future Series (cancelled): Host: Malé, Maldives; Venue: Malé Kulhivaru Ekuveni; Level: Future Series; Format: TBD	Score:	
4 October	Maldives International Future Series (cancelled): Host: Malé, Maldives; Venue: Malé Kulhivaru Ekuveni; Level: Future Series; Format: TBD	Score:	
4 October	Chile Future Series (cancelled) (Note: Tournament cancelled due to the COVID-19 pandemic in Chile on 7 September 2021.): Host: Santiago, Chile; Venue: TBC; Level: Future Series; Format: TBD		
4 October	Chile Future Series (cancelled): Host: Santiago, Chile; Venue: TBC; Level: Future Series; Format: TBD	Score:	
4 October	Chile Future Series (cancelled): Host: Santiago, Chile; Venue: TBC; Level: Future Series; Format: TBD	Score:	
4 October	Chile Future Series (cancelled): Host: Santiago, Chile; Venue: TBC; Level: Future Series; Format: TBD	Score:	
4 October	Chile Future Series (cancelled): Host: Santiago, Chile; Venue: TBC; Level: Future Series; Format: TBD	Score:	
4 October	Chile Future Series (cancelled): Host: Santiago, Chile; Venue: TBC; Level: Future Series; Format: TBD	Score:	
4 October	Bulgarian International Championship: Host: Sofia, Bulgaria; Venue: Badminton Hall "Europe"; Level: Future Series; Format: 32MS/32WS/32MD/32WD/32XD	(India) Meiraba Luwang	(Bulgaria) Daniel Nikolov
4 October	Bulgarian International Championship: Host: Sofia, Bulgaria; Venue: Badminton Hall "Europe"; Level: Future Series; Format: 32MS/32WS/32MD/32WD/32XD	Score: 21–19, 7–21, 21–14	
4 October	Bulgarian International Championship: Host: Sofia, Bulgaria; Venue: Badminton Hall "Europe"; Level: Future Series; Format: 32MS/32WS/32MD/32WD/32XD	(India) Samiya Imad Farooqui	(Turkey) Özge Bayrak
4 October	Bulgarian International Championship: Host: Sofia, Bulgaria; Venue: Badminton Hall "Europe"; Level: Future Series; Format: 32MS/32WS/32MD/32WD/32XD	Score: 16–21, 22–20, 21–11	
4 October	Bulgarian International Championship: Host: Sofia, Bulgaria; Venue: Badminton Hall "Europe"; Level: Future Series; Format: 32MS/32WS/32MD/32WD/32XD	(England) Avinash Gupta (England) Brandon Yap	(Malaysia) Lau Yi Sheng (Malaysia) Lee Yi Bo
4 October	Bulgarian International Championship: Host: Sofia, Bulgaria; Venue: Badminton Hall "Europe"; Level: Future Series; Format: 32MS/32WS/32MD/32WD/32XD	Score: 21–19, 21–19	
4 October	Bulgarian International Championship: Host: Sofia, Bulgaria; Venue: Badminton Hall "Europe"; Level: Future Series; Format: 32MS/32WS/32MD/32WD/32XD	(Denmark) Amalie Cecilie Kudsk (Denmark) Signe Schulz	(Turkey) Yasemen Bektaş (Turkey) Cansu Erçetin
4 October	Bulgarian International Championship: Host: Sofia, Bulgaria; Venue: Badminton Hall "Europe"; Level: Future Series; Format: 32MS/32WS/32MD/32WD/32XD	Score: 21–8, 21–17	
4 October	Bulgarian International Championship: Host: Sofia, Bulgaria; Venue: Badminton Hall "Europe"; Level: Future Series; Format: 32MS/32WS/32MD/32WD/32XD	(Denmark) Kristian Kræmer (Denmark) Amalie Cecilie Kudsk	(Turkey) Emre Sönmez (Turkey) Zehra Erdem
4 October	Bulgarian International Championship: Host: Sofia, Bulgaria; Venue: Badminton Hall "Europe"; Level: Future Series; Format: 32MS/32WS/32MD/32WD/32XD	Score: 21–15, 21–15	
11 October	Thomas & Uber Cup (Draw): Host: Aarhus, Denmark; Venue: Ceres Arena; Level: World Team Championships; Format: 16MT/16WT	Indonesia	China
11 October	Thomas & Uber Cup (Draw): Host: Aarhus, Denmark; Venue: Ceres Arena; Level: World Team Championships; Format: 16MT/16WT	Anthony Sinisuka Ginting	Lu Guangzu
11 October	Thomas & Uber Cup (Draw): Host: Aarhus, Denmark; Venue: Ceres Arena; Level: World Team Championships; Format: 16MT/16WT	Fajar Alfian / Muhammad Rian Ardianto	He Jiting / Zhou Haodong
11 October	Thomas & Uber Cup (Draw): Host: Aarhus, Denmark; Venue: Ceres Arena; Level: World Team Championships; Format: 16MT/16WT	Jonatan Christie	Li Shifeng
11 October	Thomas & Uber Cup (Draw): Host: Aarhus, Denmark; Venue: Ceres Arena; Level: World Team Championships; Format: 16MT/16WT	Daniel Marthin / Kevin Sanjaya Sukamuljo	Liu Cheng / Wang Yilyu
11 October	Thomas & Uber Cup (Draw): Host: Aarhus, Denmark; Venue: Ceres Arena; Level: World Team Championships; Format: 16MT/16WT	Shesar Hiren Rhustavito	Weng Hongyang
11 October	Thomas & Uber Cup (Draw): Host: Aarhus, Denmark; Venue: Ceres Arena; Level: World Team Championships; Format: 16MT/16WT	Score: 3–0	
11 October	Thomas & Uber Cup (Draw): Host: Aarhus, Denmark; Venue: Ceres Arena; Level: World Team Championships; Format: 16MT/16WT	China	Japan
11 October	Thomas & Uber Cup (Draw): Host: Aarhus, Denmark; Venue: Ceres Arena; Level: World Team Championships; Format: 16MT/16WT	Chen Yufei	Akane Yamaguchi
11 October	Thomas & Uber Cup (Draw): Host: Aarhus, Denmark; Venue: Ceres Arena; Level: World Team Championships; Format: 16MT/16WT	Chen Qingchen / Jia Yifan	Yuki Fukushima / Mayu Matsumoto
11 October	Thomas & Uber Cup (Draw): Host: Aarhus, Denmark; Venue: Ceres Arena; Level: World Team Championships; Format: 16MT/16WT	He Bingjiao	Sayaka Takahashi
11 October	Thomas & Uber Cup (Draw): Host: Aarhus, Denmark; Venue: Ceres Arena; Level: World Team Championships; Format: 16MT/16WT	Huang Dongping / Li Wenmei	Misaki Matsutomo / Nami Matsuyama
11 October	Thomas & Uber Cup (Draw): Host: Aarhus, Denmark; Venue: Ceres Arena; Level: World Team Championships; Format: 16MT/16WT	Han Yue	Aya Ohori
11 October	Thomas & Uber Cup (Draw): Host: Aarhus, Denmark; Venue: Ceres Arena; Level: World Team Championships; Format: 16MT/16WT	Score: 3–1	
11 October	Syed Modi International (Draw) (cancelled) (Note: Tournament cancelled due to the COVID-19 pandemic on 9 September 2021.): Host: Lucknow, India; Venue: TBD; Level: Super 300; Prize: $170,000; Format: 32MS/32WS/32MD/32WD/32XD		
11 October	Syed Modi International (Draw) (cancelled): Host: Lucknow, India; Venue: TBD; Level: Super 300; Prize: $170,000; Format: 32MS/32WS/32MD/32WD/32XD	Score:	
11 October	Syed Modi International (Draw) (cancelled): Host: Lucknow, India; Venue: TBD; Level: Super 300; Prize: $170,000; Format: 32MS/32WS/32MD/32WD/32XD	Score:	
11 October	Syed Modi International (Draw) (cancelled): Host: Lucknow, India; Venue: TBD; Level: Super 300; Prize: $170,000; Format: 32MS/32WS/32MD/32WD/32XD	Score:	
11 October	Syed Modi International (Draw) (cancelled): Host: Lucknow, India; Venue: TBD; Level: Super 300; Prize: $170,000; Format: 32MS/32WS/32MD/32WD/32XD	Score:	
11 October	Syed Modi International (Draw) (cancelled): Host: Lucknow, India; Venue: TBD; Level: Super 300; Prize: $170,000; Format: 32MS/32WS/32MD/32WD/32XD	Score:	
11 October	Dutch Open: Host: Almere, Netherlands; Venue: Topsportcentrum; Level: International Challenge; Prize: $15,000; Format: 32MS/32WS/32MD/32WD/32XD	(Singapore) Loh Kean Yew	(India) Lakshya Sen
11 October	Dutch Open: Host: Almere, Netherlands; Venue: Topsportcentrum; Level: International Challenge; Prize: $15,000; Format: 32MS/32WS/32MD/32WD/32XD	Score: 21–12, 21–16	
11 October	Dutch Open: Host: Almere, Netherlands; Venue: Topsportcentrum; Level: International Challenge; Prize: $15,000; Format: 32MS/32WS/32MD/32WD/32XD	(Estonia) Kristin Kuuba	(England) Abigail Holden
11 October	Dutch Open: Host: Almere, Netherlands; Venue: Topsportcentrum; Level: International Challenge; Prize: $15,000; Format: 32MS/32WS/32MD/32WD/32XD	Score: 23–21, 21–18	
11 October	Dutch Open: Host: Almere, Netherlands; Venue: Topsportcentrum; Level: International Challenge; Prize: $15,000; Format: 32MS/32WS/32MD/32WD/32XD	(Singapore) Terry Hee (Singapore) Loh Kean Hean	(Malaysia) Tan Kian Meng (Malaysia) Tan Wee Kiong
11 October	Dutch Open: Host: Almere, Netherlands; Venue: Topsportcentrum; Level: International Challenge; Prize: $15,000; Format: 32MS/32WS/32MD/32WD/32XD	Score: 21–14, 18–21, 22–20	
11 October	Dutch Open: Host: Almere, Netherlands; Venue: Topsportcentrum; Level: International Challenge; Prize: $15,000; Format: 32MS/32WS/32MD/32WD/32XD	(Sweden) Johanna Magnusson (Sweden) Clara Nistad	(Netherlands) Debora Jille (Netherlands) Cheryl Seinen
11 October	Dutch Open: Host: Almere, Netherlands; Venue: Topsportcentrum; Level: International Challenge; Prize: $15,000; Format: 32MS/32WS/32MD/32WD/32XD	Score: 17–21, 21–14, 21–12	
11 October	Dutch Open: Host: Almere, Netherlands; Venue: Topsportcentrum; Level: International Challenge; Prize: $15,000; Format: 32MS/32WS/32MD/32WD/32XD	(Denmark) Mikkel Mikkelsen (Denmark) Rikke Søby Hansen	(Netherlands) Robin Tabeling (Netherlands) Selena Piek
11 October	Dutch Open: Host: Almere, Netherlands; Venue: Topsportcentrum; Level: International Challenge; Prize: $15,000; Format: 32MS/32WS/32MD/32WD/32XD	Score: 21–18, 13–21, 21–15	
11 October	Maldives International Series (cancelled): Host: Malé, Maldives; Venue: Malé Kulhivaru Ekuveni; Level: International Series; Prize: $10,000; Format: TBD		
11 October	Maldives International Series (cancelled): Host: Malé, Maldives; Venue: Malé Kulhivaru Ekuveni; Level: International Series; Prize: $10,000; Format: TBD	Score:	
11 October	Maldives International Series (cancelled): Host: Malé, Maldives; Venue: Malé Kulhivaru Ekuveni; Level: International Series; Prize: $10,000; Format: TBD	Score:	
11 October	Maldives International Series (cancelled): Host: Malé, Maldives; Venue: Malé Kulhivaru Ekuveni; Level: International Series; Prize: $10,000; Format: TBD	Score:	
11 October	Maldives International Series (cancelled): Host: Malé, Maldives; Venue: Malé Kulhivaru Ekuveni; Level: International Series; Prize: $10,000; Format: TBD	Score:	
11 October	Maldives International Series (cancelled): Host: Malé, Maldives; Venue: Malé Kulhivaru Ekuveni; Level: International Series; Prize: $10,000; Format: TBD	Score:	
11 October	Egypt International (cancelled) (Note: Tournament cancelled due to the COVID-19 pandemic on 9 August 2021.): Host: Cairo, Egypt; Venue: Hesham ElTohamy; Level: Future Series; Format: TBD		
11 October	Egypt International (cancelled): Host: Cairo, Egypt; Venue: Hesham ElTohamy; Level: Future Series; Format: TBD	Score:	
11 October	Egypt International (cancelled): Host: Cairo, Egypt; Venue: Hesham ElTohamy; Level: Future Series; Format: TBD	Score:	
11 October	Egypt International (cancelled): Host: Cairo, Egypt; Venue: Hesham ElTohamy; Level: Future Series; Format: TBD	Score:	
11 October	Egypt International (cancelled): Host: Cairo, Egypt; Venue: Hesham ElTohamy; Level: Future Series; Format: TBD	Score:	
11 October	Egypt International (cancelled): Host: Cairo, Egypt; Venue: Hesham ElTohamy; Level: Future Series; Format: TBD	Score:	
11 October	Cyprus International: Host: Nicosia, Cyprus; Venue: Eleftheria Athletic Center; Level: Future Series; Format: 32MS/32WS/32MD/16WD/32XD	(Kazakhstan) Dmitriy Panarin	(India) Tarun Reddy Katam
11 October	Cyprus International: Host: Nicosia, Cyprus; Venue: Eleftheria Athletic Center; Level: Future Series; Format: 32MS/32WS/32MD/16WD/32XD	Score: 22–20, 9–21, 21–11	
11 October	Cyprus International: Host: Nicosia, Cyprus; Venue: Eleftheria Athletic Center; Level: Future Series; Format: 32MS/32WS/32MD/16WD/32XD	(Bulgaria) Hristomira Popovska	(Italy) Yasmine Hamza
11 October	Cyprus International: Host: Nicosia, Cyprus; Venue: Eleftheria Athletic Center; Level: Future Series; Format: 32MS/32WS/32MD/16WD/32XD	Score: 22–20, 21–11	
11 October	Cyprus International: Host: Nicosia, Cyprus; Venue: Eleftheria Athletic Center; Level: Future Series; Format: 32MS/32WS/32MD/16WD/32XD	(Russia) Georgii Lebedev (Russia) Gleb Stepakov	(Czech Republic) Jan Janoštík (Czech Republic) Jiří Král
11 October	Cyprus International: Host: Nicosia, Cyprus; Venue: Eleftheria Athletic Center; Level: Future Series; Format: 32MS/32WS/32MD/16WD/32XD	Score: 21–18, 21–15	
11 October	Cyprus International: Host: Nicosia, Cyprus; Venue: Eleftheria Athletic Center; Level: Future Series; Format: 32MS/32WS/32MD/16WD/32XD	(Italy) Katharina Fink (Italy) Yasmine Hamza	(Ukraine) Tetyana Potapenko (Ukraine) Polina Tkach
11 October	Cyprus International: Host: Nicosia, Cyprus; Venue: Eleftheria Athletic Center; Level: Future Series; Format: 32MS/32WS/32MD/16WD/32XD	Score: 21–10, 11–7 Retired	
11 October	Cyprus International: Host: Nicosia, Cyprus; Venue: Eleftheria Athletic Center; Level: Future Series; Format: 32MS/32WS/32MD/16WD/32XD	(Serbia) Mihajlo Tomić (Serbia) Anđela Vitman	(France) Maël Cattoen (France) Camille Pognante
11 October	Cyprus International: Host: Nicosia, Cyprus; Venue: Eleftheria Athletic Center; Level: Future Series; Format: 32MS/32WS/32MD/16WD/32XD	Score: 21–14, 21–16	
18 October	Denmark Open (Draw): Host: Odense, Denmark; Venue: Odense Sports Park; Level: Super 1000; Prize: $850,000; Format: 32MS/32WS/32MD/32WD/32XD	(Denmark) Viktor Axelsen	(Japan) Kento Momota
18 October	Denmark Open (Draw): Host: Odense, Denmark; Venue: Odense Sports Park; Level: Super 1000; Prize: $850,000; Format: 32MS/32WS/32MD/32WD/32XD	Score: 20–22, 21–18, 21–12	
18 October	Denmark Open (Draw): Host: Odense, Denmark; Venue: Odense Sports Park; Level: Super 1000; Prize: $850,000; Format: 32MS/32WS/32MD/32WD/32XD	(Japan) Akane Yamaguchi	(South Korea) An Se-young
18 October	Denmark Open (Draw): Host: Odense, Denmark; Venue: Odense Sports Park; Level: Super 1000; Prize: $850,000; Format: 32MS/32WS/32MD/32WD/32XD	Score: 18–21, 25–23, 16–5 retired	
18 October	Denmark Open (Draw): Host: Odense, Denmark; Venue: Odense Sports Park; Level: Super 1000; Prize: $850,000; Format: 32MS/32WS/32MD/32WD/32XD	(Japan) Takuro Hoki (Japan) Yugo Kobayashi	(Denmark) Kim Astrup (Denmark) Anders Skaarup Rasmussen
18 October	Denmark Open (Draw): Host: Odense, Denmark; Venue: Odense Sports Park; Level: Super 1000; Prize: $850,000; Format: 32MS/32WS/32MD/32WD/32XD	Score: 21–18, 21–12	
18 October	Denmark Open (Draw): Host: Odense, Denmark; Venue: Odense Sports Park; Level: Super 1000; Prize: $850,000; Format: 32MS/32WS/32MD/32WD/32XD	(China) Huang Dongping (China) Zheng Yu	(South Korea) Lee So-hee (South Korea) Shin Seung-chan
18 October	Denmark Open (Draw): Host: Odense, Denmark; Venue: Odense Sports Park; Level: Super 1000; Prize: $850,000; Format: 32MS/32WS/32MD/32WD/32XD	Score: 21–15, 21–17	
18 October	Denmark Open (Draw): Host: Odense, Denmark; Venue: Odense Sports Park; Level: Super 1000; Prize: $850,000; Format: 32MS/32WS/32MD/32WD/32XD	(Japan) Yuta Watanabe (Japan) Arisa Higashino	(Thailand) Dechapol Puavaranukroh (Thailand) Sapsiree Taerattanachai
18 October	Denmark Open (Draw): Host: Odense, Denmark; Venue: Odense Sports Park; Level: Super 1000; Prize: $850,000; Format: 32MS/32WS/32MD/32WD/32XD	Score: 21–18, 21–9	
18 October	African Mixed Team Championships (Draw): Host: Kampala, Uganda; Venue: MTN Arena; Level: Continental Team Championships; Format: 9 teams (Round robin)	Egypt	Algeria
18 October	African Mixed Team Championships (Draw): Host: Kampala, Uganda; Venue: MTN Arena; Level: Continental Team Championships; Format: 9 teams (Round robin)	Ahmed Salah / Jana Ashraf	Koceila Mammeri / Tanina Mammeri
18 October	African Mixed Team Championships (Draw): Host: Kampala, Uganda; Venue: MTN Arena; Level: Continental Team Championships; Format: 9 teams (Round robin)	Doha Hany	Halla Bouksani
18 October	African Mixed Team Championships (Draw): Host: Kampala, Uganda; Venue: MTN Arena; Level: Continental Team Championships; Format: 9 teams (Round robin)	Adham Hatem Elgamal	Mohamed Abderrahime Belarbi
18 October	African Mixed Team Championships (Draw): Host: Kampala, Uganda; Venue: MTN Arena; Level: Continental Team Championships; Format: 9 teams (Round robin)	Nour Ahmed Youssri / Doha Hany	Mounib Celia / Tanina Mammeri
18 October	African Mixed Team Championships (Draw): Host: Kampala, Uganda; Venue: MTN Arena; Level: Continental Team Championships; Format: 9 teams (Round robin)	Abdelrahman Abdelhakim / Ahmed Salah	Koceila Mammeri / Youcef Sabri Medel
18 October	African Mixed Team Championships (Draw): Host: Kampala, Uganda; Venue: MTN Arena; Level: Continental Team Championships; Format: 9 teams (Round robin)	Score: 3–1	
18 October	India International Challenge: Host: Bengaluru, India; Venue: Prakash Padukone Badminton Academy; Level: International Challenge; Prize: $25,000; Format: 64MS/64WS/32MD/32WD/32XD	(India) Priyanshu Rajawat	(India) Raghu Mariswamy
18 October	India International Challenge: Host: Bengaluru, India; Venue: Prakash Padukone Badminton Academy; Level: International Challenge; Prize: $25,000; Format: 64MS/64WS/32MD/32WD/32XD	Score: 12–21, 21–10, 21–8	
18 October	India International Challenge: Host: Bengaluru, India; Venue: Prakash Padukone Badminton Academy; Level: International Challenge; Prize: $25,000; Format: 64MS/64WS/32MD/32WD/32XD	(India) Anupama Upadhyaya	(India) Unnati Hooda
18 October	India International Challenge: Host: Bengaluru, India; Venue: Prakash Padukone Badminton Academy; Level: International Challenge; Prize: $25,000; Format: 64MS/64WS/32MD/32WD/32XD	Score: 21–19, 21–16	
18 October	India International Challenge: Host: Bengaluru, India; Venue: Prakash Padukone Badminton Academy; Level: International Challenge; Prize: $25,000; Format: 64MS/64WS/32MD/32WD/32XD	(India) Krishna Prasad Garaga (India) Vishnu Vardhan Goud Panjala	(India) Arun George (India) Sanyam Shukla
18 October	India International Challenge: Host: Bengaluru, India; Venue: Prakash Padukone Badminton Academy; Level: International Challenge; Prize: $25,000; Format: 64MS/64WS/32MD/32WD/32XD	Score: 24–22, 13–21, 22–20	
18 October	India International Challenge: Host: Bengaluru, India; Venue: Prakash Padukone Badminton Academy; Level: International Challenge; Prize: $25,000; Format: 64MS/64WS/32MD/32WD/32XD	(India) Treesa Jolly (India) Gayathri Gopichand	(India) Tanisha Crasto (India) Rutaparna Panda
18 October	India International Challenge: Host: Bengaluru, India; Venue: Prakash Padukone Badminton Academy; Level: International Challenge; Prize: $25,000; Format: 64MS/64WS/32MD/32WD/32XD	Score: 23–21, 21–14	
18 October	India International Challenge: Host: Bengaluru, India; Venue: Prakash Padukone Badminton Academy; Level: International Challenge; Prize: $25,000; Format: 64MS/64WS/32MD/32WD/32XD	(India) Ishaan Bhatnagar (India) Tanisha Crasto	(India) K. Sai Pratheek (India) Gayathri Gopichand
18 October	India International Challenge: Host: Bengaluru, India; Venue: Prakash Padukone Badminton Academy; Level: International Challenge; Prize: $25,000; Format: 64MS/64WS/32MD/32WD/32XD	Score: 21–16, 21–19	
18 October	Czech Open: Host: Brno, Czech Republic; Venue: Sportovni hala Vodova; Level: International Series; Prize: $5,000; Format: 32MS/32WS/32MD/32WD/32XD	(Czech Republic) Jan Louda	(Malaysia) Ng Tze Yong
18 October	Czech Open: Host: Brno, Czech Republic; Venue: Sportovni hala Vodova; Level: International Series; Prize: $5,000; Format: 32MS/32WS/32MD/32WD/32XD	Score: 16–21, 21–16, 27–25	
18 October	Czech Open: Host: Brno, Czech Republic; Venue: Sportovni hala Vodova; Level: International Series; Prize: $5,000; Format: 32MS/32WS/32MD/32WD/32XD	(Indonesia) Putri Kusuma Wardani	(Malaysia) Siti Nurshuhaini
18 October	Czech Open: Host: Brno, Czech Republic; Venue: Sportovni hala Vodova; Level: International Series; Prize: $5,000; Format: 32MS/32WS/32MD/32WD/32XD	Score: 21–16, 21–5	
18 October	Czech Open: Host: Brno, Czech Republic; Venue: Sportovni hala Vodova; Level: International Series; Prize: $5,000; Format: 32MS/32WS/32MD/32WD/32XD	(Singapore) Terry Hee (Singapore) Loh Kean Hean	(Malaysia) Man Wei Chong (Malaysia) Tee Kai Wun
18 October	Czech Open: Host: Brno, Czech Republic; Venue: Sportovni hala Vodova; Level: International Series; Prize: $5,000; Format: 32MS/32WS/32MD/32WD/32XD	Score: 13–21, 21–15, 21–15	
18 October	Czech Open: Host: Brno, Czech Republic; Venue: Sportovni hala Vodova; Level: International Series; Prize: $5,000; Format: 32MS/32WS/32MD/32WD/32XD	(Malaysia) Anna Cheong (Malaysia) Teoh Mei Xing	(Indonesia) Febby Valencia Dwijayanti Gani (Indonesia) Jesita Putri Miantoro
18 October	Czech Open: Host: Brno, Czech Republic; Venue: Sportovni hala Vodova; Level: International Series; Prize: $5,000; Format: 32MS/32WS/32MD/32WD/32XD	Score: 21–15, 16–21, 21–17	
18 October	Czech Open: Host: Brno, Czech Republic; Venue: Sportovni hala Vodova; Level: International Series; Prize: $5,000; Format: 32MS/32WS/32MD/32WD/32XD	(Singapore) Terry Hee (Singapore) Tan Wei Han	(Russia) Lev Barinov (Russia) Anastasiia Boiarun
18 October	Czech Open: Host: Brno, Czech Republic; Venue: Sportovni hala Vodova; Level: International Series; Prize: $5,000; Format: 32MS/32WS/32MD/32WD/32XD	Score: 21–18, 21–12	
18 October	Algeria International (cancelled): Host: Algiers, Algeria; Venue: Federation Algerienne de Badminton; Level: Future Series; Format: TBD		
18 October	Algeria International (cancelled): Host: Algiers, Algeria; Venue: Federation Algerienne de Badminton; Level: Future Series; Format: TBD	Score:	
18 October	Algeria International (cancelled): Host: Algiers, Algeria; Venue: Federation Algerienne de Badminton; Level: Future Series; Format: TBD	Score:	
18 October	Algeria International (cancelled): Host: Algiers, Algeria; Venue: Federation Algerienne de Badminton; Level: Future Series; Format: TBD	Score:	
18 October	Algeria International (cancelled): Host: Algiers, Algeria; Venue: Federation Algerienne de Badminton; Level: Future Series; Format: TBD	Score:	
18 October	Algeria International (cancelled): Host: Algiers, Algeria; Venue: Federation Algerienne de Badminton; Level: Future Series; Format: TBD	Score:	
25 October	French Open (Draw): Host: Paris, France; Venue: Stade Pierre de Coubertin; Level: Super 750; Prize: $600,000; Format: 32MS/32WS/32MD/32WD/32XD	(Japan) Kanta Tsuneyama	(Chinese Taipei) Chou Tien-chen
25 October	French Open (Draw): Host: Paris, France; Venue: Stade Pierre de Coubertin; Level: Super 750; Prize: $600,000; Format: 32MS/32WS/32MD/32WD/32XD	Score: 15–21, 21–8, 21–17	
25 October	French Open (Draw): Host: Paris, France; Venue: Stade Pierre de Coubertin; Level: Super 750; Prize: $600,000; Format: 32MS/32WS/32MD/32WD/32XD	(Japan) Akane Yamaguchi	(Japan) Sayaka Takahashi
25 October	French Open (Draw): Host: Paris, France; Venue: Stade Pierre de Coubertin; Level: Super 750; Prize: $600,000; Format: 32MS/32WS/32MD/32WD/32XD	Score: 21–18, 21–12	
25 October	French Open (Draw): Host: Paris, France; Venue: Stade Pierre de Coubertin; Level: Super 750; Prize: $600,000; Format: 32MS/32WS/32MD/32WD/32XD	(South Korea) Ko Sung-hyun (South Korea) Shin Baek-cheol	(Indonesia) Marcus Fernaldi Gideon (Indonesia) Kevin Sanjaya Sukamuljo
25 October	French Open (Draw): Host: Paris, France; Venue: Stade Pierre de Coubertin; Level: Super 750; Prize: $600,000; Format: 32MS/32WS/32MD/32WD/32XD	Score: 21–17, 22–20	
25 October	French Open (Draw): Host: Paris, France; Venue: Stade Pierre de Coubertin; Level: Super 750; Prize: $600,000; Format: 32MS/32WS/32MD/32WD/32XD	(South Korea) Lee So-hee (South Korea) Shin Seung-chan	(South Korea) Kim So-yeong (South Korea) Kong Hee-yong
25 October	French Open (Draw): Host: Paris, France; Venue: Stade Pierre de Coubertin; Level: Super 750; Prize: $600,000; Format: 32MS/32WS/32MD/32WD/32XD	Score: 21–17, 21–12	
25 October	French Open (Draw): Host: Paris, France; Venue: Stade Pierre de Coubertin; Level: Super 750; Prize: $600,000; Format: 32MS/32WS/32MD/32WD/32XD	(Japan) Yuta Watanabe (Japan) Arisa Higashino	(Denmark) Mathias Christiansen (Denmark) Alexandra Bøje
25 October	French Open (Draw): Host: Paris, France; Venue: Stade Pierre de Coubertin; Level: Super 750; Prize: $600,000; Format: 32MS/32WS/32MD/32WD/32XD	Score: 21–8, 21–17	
25 October	African Badminton Championships (Draw): Host: Kampala, Uganda; Venue: MTN Arena; Level: Continental Championships (International Challenge); Format: 64MS/32WS/16MD/16WD/32XD	(Egypt) Adham Hatem Elgamal	(Egypt) Ahmed Salah
25 October	African Badminton Championships (Draw): Host: Kampala, Uganda; Venue: MTN Arena; Level: Continental Championships (International Challenge); Format: 64MS/32WS/16MD/16WD/32XD	Score: 21–14, 21–14	
25 October	African Badminton Championships (Draw): Host: Kampala, Uganda; Venue: MTN Arena; Level: Continental Championships (International Challenge); Format: 64MS/32WS/16MD/16WD/32XD	(South Africa) Johanita Scholtz	(Egypt) Doha Hany
25 October	African Badminton Championships (Draw): Host: Kampala, Uganda; Venue: MTN Arena; Level: Continental Championships (International Challenge); Format: 64MS/32WS/16MD/16WD/32XD	Score: 21–15, 21–11	
25 October	African Badminton Championships (Draw): Host: Kampala, Uganda; Venue: MTN Arena; Level: Continental Championships (International Challenge); Format: 64MS/32WS/16MD/16WD/32XD	(Algeria) Koceila Mammeri (Algeria) Youcef Sabri Medel	(Egypt) Abdelrahman Abdelhakim (Egypt) Ahmed Salah
25 October	African Badminton Championships (Draw): Host: Kampala, Uganda; Venue: MTN Arena; Level: Continental Championships (International Challenge); Format: 64MS/32WS/16MD/16WD/32XD	Score: 21–16, 21–13	
25 October	African Badminton Championships (Draw): Host: Kampala, Uganda; Venue: MTN Arena; Level: Continental Championships (International Challenge); Format: 64MS/32WS/16MD/16WD/32XD	(South Africa) Amy Ackerman (South Africa) Johanita Scholtz	(Algeria) Mounib Celia (Algeria) Tanina Mammeri
25 October	African Badminton Championships (Draw): Host: Kampala, Uganda; Venue: MTN Arena; Level: Continental Championships (International Challenge); Format: 64MS/32WS/16MD/16WD/32XD	Score: 23–21, 21–13	
25 October	African Badminton Championships (Draw): Host: Kampala, Uganda; Venue: MTN Arena; Level: Continental Championships (International Challenge); Format: 64MS/32WS/16MD/16WD/32XD	(Algeria) Koceila Mammeri (Algeria) Tanina Mammeri	(Egypt) Adham Hatem Elgamal (Egypt) Doha Hany
25 October	African Badminton Championships (Draw): Host: Kampala, Uganda; Venue: MTN Arena; Level: Continental Championships (International Challenge); Format: 64MS/32WS/16MD/16WD/32XD	Score: 21–10, 21–7	
25 October	Belgian International: Host: Leuven, Belgium; Venue: Sportoase Philipssite Leuven; Level: International Challenge; Prize: $15,000; Format: 32MS/32WS/32MD/32WD/32XD	(Malaysia) Ng Tze Yong	(India) Ajay Jayaram
25 October	Belgian International: Host: Leuven, Belgium; Venue: Sportoase Philipssite Leuven; Level: International Challenge; Prize: $15,000; Format: 32MS/32WS/32MD/32WD/32XD	Score: 21–14, 21–14	
25 October	Belgian International: Host: Leuven, Belgium; Venue: Sportoase Philipssite Leuven; Level: International Challenge; Prize: $15,000; Format: 32MS/32WS/32MD/32WD/32XD	(Japan) Riko Gunji	(Chinese Taipei) Hsu Wen-chi
25 October	Belgian International: Host: Leuven, Belgium; Venue: Sportoase Philipssite Leuven; Level: International Challenge; Prize: $15,000; Format: 32MS/32WS/32MD/32WD/32XD	Score: 12–21, 21–16, 23–21	
25 October	Belgian International: Host: Leuven, Belgium; Venue: Sportoase Philipssite Leuven; Level: International Challenge; Prize: $15,000; Format: 32MS/32WS/32MD/32WD/32XD	(Indonesia) Pramudya Kusumawardana (Indonesia) Yeremia Rambitan	(Indonesia) Muhammad Shohibul Fikri (Indonesia) Bagas Maulana
25 October	Belgian International: Host: Leuven, Belgium; Venue: Sportoase Philipssite Leuven; Level: International Challenge; Prize: $15,000; Format: 32MS/32WS/32MD/32WD/32XD	Score: 21–18, 22–20	
25 October	Belgian International: Host: Leuven, Belgium; Venue: Sportoase Philipssite Leuven; Level: International Challenge; Prize: $15,000; Format: 32MS/32WS/32MD/32WD/32XD	(Japan) Rin Iwanaga (Japan) Kie Nakanishi	(Scotland) Julie MacPherson (Scotland) Ciara Torrance
25 October	Belgian International: Host: Leuven, Belgium; Venue: Sportoase Philipssite Leuven; Level: International Challenge; Prize: $15,000; Format: 32MS/32WS/32MD/32WD/32XD	Score: 21–12, 21–15	
25 October	Belgian International: Host: Leuven, Belgium; Venue: Sportoase Philipssite Leuven; Level: International Challenge; Prize: $15,000; Format: 32MS/32WS/32MD/32WD/32XD	(Japan) Hiroki Midorikawa (Japan) Natsu Saito	(Denmark) Jesper Toft (Denmark) Clara Graversen
25 October	Belgian International: Host: Leuven, Belgium; Venue: Sportoase Philipssite Leuven; Level: International Challenge; Prize: $15,000; Format: 32MS/32WS/32MD/32WD/32XD	Score: 21–18, 21–9	
25 October	Dominican Open: Host: Santo Domingo, Dominican Republic; Venue: Palacio Gioriver Arias; Level: Future Series; Prize: $2,000; Format: 32MS/32WS/32MD/16WD/32XD	(Brazil) Jonathan Matias	(Brazil) Donnians Oliveira
25 October	Dominican Open: Host: Santo Domingo, Dominican Republic; Venue: Palacio Gioriver Arias; Level: Future Series; Prize: $2,000; Format: 32MS/32WS/32MD/16WD/32XD	Score: 14–21, 21–14, 22–20	
25 October	Dominican Open: Host: Santo Domingo, Dominican Republic; Venue: Palacio Gioriver Arias; Level: Future Series; Prize: $2,000; Format: 32MS/32WS/32MD/16WD/32XD	(Brazil) Juliana Viana Vieira	(Brazil) Sâmia Lima
25 October	Dominican Open: Host: Santo Domingo, Dominican Republic; Venue: Palacio Gioriver Arias; Level: Future Series; Prize: $2,000; Format: 32MS/32WS/32MD/16WD/32XD	Score: 21–9, 21–17	
25 October	Dominican Open: Host: Santo Domingo, Dominican Republic; Venue: Palacio Gioriver Arias; Level: Future Series; Prize: $2,000; Format: 32MS/32WS/32MD/16WD/32XD	(Brazil) Fabricio Farias (Brazil) Francielton Farias	(Brazil) Izak Batalha (Brazil) Artur Silva Pomoceno
25 October	Dominican Open: Host: Santo Domingo, Dominican Republic; Venue: Palacio Gioriver Arias; Level: Future Series; Prize: $2,000; Format: 32MS/32WS/32MD/16WD/32XD	Score: 21–16, 21–12	
25 October	Dominican Open: Host: Santo Domingo, Dominican Republic; Venue: Palacio Gioriver Arias; Level: Future Series; Prize: $2,000; Format: 32MS/32WS/32MD/16WD/32XD	(Brazil) Jaqueline Lima (Brazil) Sâmia Lima	(Brazil) Sânia Lima (Brazil) Tamires Santos
25 October	Dominican Open: Host: Santo Domingo, Dominican Republic; Venue: Palacio Gioriver Arias; Level: Future Series; Prize: $2,000; Format: 32MS/32WS/32MD/16WD/32XD	Score: 21–14, 21–12	
25 October	Dominican Open: Host: Santo Domingo, Dominican Republic; Venue: Palacio Gioriver Arias; Level: Future Series; Prize: $2,000; Format: 32MS/32WS/32MD/16WD/32XD	(Brazil) Fabricio Farias (Brazil) Jaqueline Lima	(Brazil) Artur Silva Pomoceno (Brazil) Sâmia Lima
25 October	Dominican Open: Host: Santo Domingo, Dominican Republic; Venue: Palacio Gioriver Arias; Level: Future Series; Prize: $2,000; Format: 32MS/32WS/32MD/16WD/32XD	Score: 24–22, 21–19	
25 October	Israel Open (cancelled) (Note: Tournament cancelled due to the COVID-19 pandemic on 21 September 2021.): Host: Kibbutz Hatzor, Israel; Venue: Hatzor Sports Hall; Level: Future Series; Prize: $10,000; Format: TBD		
25 October	Israel Open (cancelled): Host: Kibbutz Hatzor, Israel; Venue: Hatzor Sports Hall; Level: Future Series; Prize: $10,000; Format: TBD	Score:	
25 October	Israel Open (cancelled): Host: Kibbutz Hatzor, Israel; Venue: Hatzor Sports Hall; Level: Future Series; Prize: $10,000; Format: TBD	Score:	
25 October	Israel Open (cancelled): Host: Kibbutz Hatzor, Israel; Venue: Hatzor Sports Hall; Level: Future Series; Prize: $10,000; Format: TBD	Score:	
25 October	Israel Open (cancelled): Host: Kibbutz Hatzor, Israel; Venue: Hatzor Sports Hall; Level: Future Series; Prize: $10,000; Format: TBD	Score:	
25 October	Israel Open (cancelled): Host: Kibbutz Hatzor, Israel; Venue: Hatzor Sports Hall; Level: Future Series; Prize: $10,000; Format: TBD	Score:	

=== November ===
Week commencing	Tournament	Champions	Runners-up
1 November	Hylo Open (Draw): Host: Saarbrücken, Germany; Venue: Saarlandhalle; Level: Super 500; Prize: $400,000; Format: 32MS/32WS/32MD/32WD/32XD	(Singapore) Loh Kean Yew	(Malaysia) Lee Zii Jia
1 November	Hylo Open (Draw): Host: Saarbrücken, Germany; Venue: Saarlandhalle; Level: Super 500; Prize: $400,000; Format: 32MS/32WS/32MD/32WD/32XD	Score: 19–21, 21–13, 17–12 retired	
1 November	Hylo Open (Draw): Host: Saarbrücken, Germany; Venue: Saarlandhalle; Level: Super 500; Prize: $400,000; Format: 32MS/32WS/32MD/32WD/32XD	(Thailand) Busanan Ongbamrungphan	(Singapore) Yeo Jia Min
1 November	Hylo Open (Draw): Host: Saarbrücken, Germany; Venue: Saarlandhalle; Level: Super 500; Prize: $400,000; Format: 32MS/32WS/32MD/32WD/32XD	Score: 21–10, 21–14	
1 November	Hylo Open (Draw): Host: Saarbrücken, Germany; Venue: Saarlandhalle; Level: Super 500; Prize: $400,000; Format: 32MS/32WS/32MD/32WD/32XD	(Indonesia) Marcus Fernaldi Gideon (Indonesia) Kevin Sanjaya Sukamuljo	(Indonesia) Leo Rolly Carnando (Indonesia) Daniel Marthin
1 November	Hylo Open (Draw): Host: Saarbrücken, Germany; Venue: Saarlandhalle; Level: Super 500; Prize: $400,000; Format: 32MS/32WS/32MD/32WD/32XD	Score: 21–14, 21–19	
1 November	Hylo Open (Draw): Host: Saarbrücken, Germany; Venue: Saarlandhalle; Level: Super 500; Prize: $400,000; Format: 32MS/32WS/32MD/32WD/32XD	(Japan) Chisato Hoshi (Japan) Aoi Matsuda	(Japan) Rin Iwanaga (Japan) Kie Nakanishi
1 November	Hylo Open (Draw): Host: Saarbrücken, Germany; Venue: Saarlandhalle; Level: Super 500; Prize: $400,000; Format: 32MS/32WS/32MD/32WD/32XD	Score: 22–20, 21–18	
1 November	Hylo Open (Draw): Host: Saarbrücken, Germany; Venue: Saarlandhalle; Level: Super 500; Prize: $400,000; Format: 32MS/32WS/32MD/32WD/32XD	(Thailand) Dechapol Puavaranukroh (Thailand) Sapsiree Taerattanachai	(Indonesia) Praveen Jordan (Indonesia) Melati Daeva Oktavianti
1 November	Hylo Open (Draw): Host: Saarbrücken, Germany; Venue: Saarlandhalle; Level: Super 500; Prize: $400,000; Format: 32MS/32WS/32MD/32WD/32XD	Score: 22–20, 21–14	
1 November	Macau Open (Draw) (cancelled) (Note: Tournament cancelled due to the COVID-19 pandemic on 11 August 2021.): Host: Macau; Venue: TBD; Level: Super 300; Prize: $170,000; Format: 32MS/32WS/32MD/32WD/32XD		
1 November	Macau Open (Draw) (cancelled): Host: Macau; Venue: TBD; Level: Super 300; Prize: $170,000; Format: 32MS/32WS/32MD/32WD/32XD	Score:	
1 November	Macau Open (Draw) (cancelled): Host: Macau; Venue: TBD; Level: Super 300; Prize: $170,000; Format: 32MS/32WS/32MD/32WD/32XD	Score:	
1 November	Macau Open (Draw) (cancelled): Host: Macau; Venue: TBD; Level: Super 300; Prize: $170,000; Format: 32MS/32WS/32MD/32WD/32XD	Score:	
1 November	Macau Open (Draw) (cancelled): Host: Macau; Venue: TBD; Level: Super 300; Prize: $170,000; Format: 32MS/32WS/32MD/32WD/32XD	Score:	
1 November	Macau Open (Draw) (cancelled): Host: Macau; Venue: TBD; Level: Super 300; Prize: $170,000; Format: 32MS/32WS/32MD/32WD/32XD	Score:	
1 November	Lagos International (cancelled): Host: Lagos, Nigeria; Venue: Sir Molade Okoya-Thomas Hall; Level: International Challenge; Prize: $25,000; Format: TBD		
1 November	Lagos International (cancelled): Host: Lagos, Nigeria; Venue: Sir Molade Okoya-Thomas Hall; Level: International Challenge; Prize: $25,000; Format: TBD	Score:	
1 November	Lagos International (cancelled): Host: Lagos, Nigeria; Venue: Sir Molade Okoya-Thomas Hall; Level: International Challenge; Prize: $25,000; Format: TBD	Score:	
1 November	Lagos International (cancelled): Host: Lagos, Nigeria; Venue: Sir Molade Okoya-Thomas Hall; Level: International Challenge; Prize: $25,000; Format: TBD	Score:	
1 November	Lagos International (cancelled): Host: Lagos, Nigeria; Venue: Sir Molade Okoya-Thomas Hall; Level: International Challenge; Prize: $25,000; Format: TBD	Score:	
1 November	Lagos International (cancelled): Host: Lagos, Nigeria; Venue: Sir Molade Okoya-Thomas Hall; Level: International Challenge; Prize: $25,000; Format: TBD	Score:	
1 November	Hungarian International: Host: Budaors, Hungary; Venue: Budaors Sportshall; Level: International Series; Prize: $10,000; Format: 32MS/32WS/32MD/32WD/32XD	(Bulgaria) Daniel Nikolov	(India) Sathish Kumar Karunakaran
1 November	Hungarian International: Host: Budaors, Hungary; Venue: Budaors Sportshall; Level: International Series; Prize: $10,000; Format: 32MS/32WS/32MD/32WD/32XD	Score: 21–17, 21–18	
1 November	Hungarian International: Host: Budaors, Hungary; Venue: Budaors Sportshall; Level: International Series; Prize: $10,000; Format: 32MS/32WS/32MD/32WD/32XD	(Chinese Taipei) Hsu Wen-chi	(India) Aditi Bhatt
1 November	Hungarian International: Host: Budaors, Hungary; Venue: Budaors Sportshall; Level: International Series; Prize: $10,000; Format: 32MS/32WS/32MD/32WD/32XD	Score: 16–21, 21–11, 21–7	
1 November	Hungarian International: Host: Budaors, Hungary; Venue: Budaors Sportshall; Level: International Series; Prize: $10,000; Format: 32MS/32WS/32MD/32WD/32XD	(Denmark) Emil Lauritzen (Denmark) Mads Vestergaard	(England) Rory Easton (England) Zach Russ
1 November	Hungarian International: Host: Budaors, Hungary; Venue: Budaors Sportshall; Level: International Series; Prize: $10,000; Format: 32MS/32WS/32MD/32WD/32XD	Score: 18–21, 21–13, 21–13	
1 November	Hungarian International: Host: Budaors, Hungary; Venue: Budaors Sportshall; Level: International Series; Prize: $10,000; Format: 32MS/32WS/32MD/32WD/32XD	(Thailand) Ornnicha Jongsathapornparn (Thailand) Phataimas Muenwong	(Denmark) Amalie Cecilie Kudsk (Denmark) Frederikke Lund
1 November	Hungarian International: Host: Budaors, Hungary; Venue: Budaors Sportshall; Level: International Series; Prize: $10,000; Format: 32MS/32WS/32MD/32WD/32XD	Score: 21–10, 21–6	
1 November	Hungarian International: Host: Budaors, Hungary; Venue: Budaors Sportshall; Level: International Series; Prize: $10,000; Format: 32MS/32WS/32MD/32WD/32XD	(England) Rory Easton (England) Annie Lado	(Denmark) Mads Vestergaard (Denmark) Clara Løber
1 November	Hungarian International: Host: Budaors, Hungary; Venue: Budaors Sportshall; Level: International Series; Prize: $10,000; Format: 32MS/32WS/32MD/32WD/32XD	Score: 21–18, 21–17	
8 November	Fuzhou China Open (Draw) (cancelled) (Note: Tournament cancelled due to the COVID-19 pandemic on 28 June 2021.): Host: Fuzhou, China; Venue: Haixia Olympic Sports Center; Level: Super 750; Prize: $750,000; Format: 32MS/32WS/32MD/32WD/32XD		
8 November	Fuzhou China Open (Draw) (cancelled): Host: Fuzhou, China; Venue: Haixia Olympic Sports Center; Level: Super 750; Prize: $750,000; Format: 32MS/32WS/32MD/32WD/32XD	Score:	
8 November	Fuzhou China Open (Draw) (cancelled): Host: Fuzhou, China; Venue: Haixia Olympic Sports Center; Level: Super 750; Prize: $750,000; Format: 32MS/32WS/32MD/32WD/32XD	Score:	
8 November	Fuzhou China Open (Draw) (cancelled): Host: Fuzhou, China; Venue: Haixia Olympic Sports Center; Level: Super 750; Prize: $750,000; Format: 32MS/32WS/32MD/32WD/32XD	Score:	
8 November	Fuzhou China Open (Draw) (cancelled): Host: Fuzhou, China; Venue: Haixia Olympic Sports Center; Level: Super 750; Prize: $750,000; Format: 32MS/32WS/32MD/32WD/32XD	Score:	
8 November	Fuzhou China Open (Draw) (cancelled): Host: Fuzhou, China; Venue: Haixia Olympic Sports Center; Level: Super 750; Prize: $750,000; Format: 32MS/32WS/32MD/32WD/32XD	Score:	
8 November	Malaysia International Challenge (cancelled): Host: Kuala Lumpur, Malaysia; Venue: TBD; Level: International Challenge; Prize: $25,000; Format: TBD		
8 November	Malaysia International Challenge (cancelled): Host: Kuala Lumpur, Malaysia; Venue: TBD; Level: International Challenge; Prize: $25,000; Format: TBD	Score:	
8 November	Malaysia International Challenge (cancelled): Host: Kuala Lumpur, Malaysia; Venue: TBD; Level: International Challenge; Prize: $25,000; Format: TBD	Score:	
8 November	Malaysia International Challenge (cancelled): Host: Kuala Lumpur, Malaysia; Venue: TBD; Level: International Challenge; Prize: $25,000; Format: TBD	Score:	
8 November	Malaysia International Challenge (cancelled): Host: Kuala Lumpur, Malaysia; Venue: TBD; Level: International Challenge; Prize: $25,000; Format: TBD	Score:	
8 November	Malaysia International Challenge (cancelled): Host: Kuala Lumpur, Malaysia; Venue: TBD; Level: International Challenge; Prize: $25,000; Format: TBD	Score:	
8 November	Norwegian International (cancelled) (Note: Tournament cancelled due to the COVID-19 pandemic on 21 September 2021.): Host: Sandefjord, Norway; Venue: Jotunhallen; Level: International Series; Prize: $10,000; Format: TBD		
8 November	Norwegian International (cancelled): Host: Sandefjord, Norway; Venue: Jotunhallen; Level: International Series; Prize: $10,000; Format: TBD	Score:	
8 November	Norwegian International (cancelled): Host: Sandefjord, Norway; Venue: Jotunhallen; Level: International Series; Prize: $10,000; Format: TBD	Score:	
8 November	Norwegian International (cancelled): Host: Sandefjord, Norway; Venue: Jotunhallen; Level: International Series; Prize: $10,000; Format: TBD	Score:	
8 November	Norwegian International (cancelled): Host: Sandefjord, Norway; Venue: Jotunhallen; Level: International Series; Prize: $10,000; Format: TBD	Score:	
8 November	Norwegian International (cancelled): Host: Sandefjord, Norway; Venue: Jotunhallen; Level: International Series; Prize: $10,000; Format: TBD	Score:	
8 November	Cameroon International (cancelled) (Note: Tournament cancelled due to the COVID-19 pandemic on 24 August 2021.): Host: Yaoundé, Cameroon; Venue: Palais Polyvalent des Sports de Yaoundé; Level: International Series; Prize: $10,000; Format: TBD		
8 November	Cameroon International (cancelled): Host: Yaoundé, Cameroon; Venue: Palais Polyvalent des Sports de Yaoundé; Level: International Series; Prize: $10,000; Format: TBD	Score:	
8 November	Cameroon International (cancelled): Host: Yaoundé, Cameroon; Venue: Palais Polyvalent des Sports de Yaoundé; Level: International Series; Prize: $10,000; Format: TBD	Score:	
8 November	Cameroon International (cancelled): Host: Yaoundé, Cameroon; Venue: Palais Polyvalent des Sports de Yaoundé; Level: International Series; Prize: $10,000; Format: TBD	Score:	
8 November	Cameroon International (cancelled): Host: Yaoundé, Cameroon; Venue: Palais Polyvalent des Sports de Yaoundé; Level: International Series; Prize: $10,000; Format: TBD	Score:	
8 November	Cameroon International (cancelled): Host: Yaoundé, Cameroon; Venue: Palais Polyvalent des Sports de Yaoundé; Level: International Series; Prize: $10,000; Format: TBD	Score:	
8 November	Guatemala Future Series: Host: Guatemala City, Guatemala; Venue: Gimnasio Teodoro Palacios Flores; Level: Future Series; Format: 32MS/32WS/8MD/16WD/16XD	(Guatemala) Rubén Castellanos	(United States) Don Henley Averia
8 November	Guatemala Future Series: Host: Guatemala City, Guatemala; Venue: Gimnasio Teodoro Palacios Flores; Level: Future Series; Format: 32MS/32WS/8MD/16WD/16XD	Score: 21–17, 13–21, 24–22	
8 November	Guatemala Future Series: Host: Guatemala City, Guatemala; Venue: Gimnasio Teodoro Palacios Flores; Level: Future Series; Format: 32MS/32WS/8MD/16WD/16XD	(United States) Lauren Lam	(United States) Ishika Jaiswal
8 November	Guatemala Future Series: Host: Guatemala City, Guatemala; Venue: Gimnasio Teodoro Palacios Flores; Level: Future Series; Format: 32MS/32WS/8MD/16WD/16XD	Score: 21–11, 21–10	
8 November	Guatemala Future Series: Host: Guatemala City, Guatemala; Venue: Gimnasio Teodoro Palacios Flores; Level: Future Series; Format: 32MS/32WS/8MD/16WD/16XD	(United States) Enrico Asuncion (United States) Don Henley Averia	(Guatemala) Rubén Castellanos (Guatemala) Christopher Martínez
8 November	Guatemala Future Series: Host: Guatemala City, Guatemala; Venue: Gimnasio Teodoro Palacios Flores; Level: Future Series; Format: 32MS/32WS/8MD/16WD/16XD	Score: 21–19, 25–23	
8 November	Guatemala Future Series: Host: Guatemala City, Guatemala; Venue: Gimnasio Teodoro Palacios Flores; Level: Future Series; Format: 32MS/32WS/8MD/16WD/16XD	(Guatemala) Diana Corleto (Guatemala) Nikté Sotomayor	(United States) Lauren Lam (United States) Kodi Tang Lee
8 November	Guatemala Future Series: Host: Guatemala City, Guatemala; Venue: Gimnasio Teodoro Palacios Flores; Level: Future Series; Format: 32MS/32WS/8MD/16WD/16XD	Score: 21–19, 21–13	
8 November	Guatemala Future Series: Host: Guatemala City, Guatemala; Venue: Gimnasio Teodoro Palacios Flores; Level: Future Series; Format: 32MS/32WS/8MD/16WD/16XD	(Guatemala) Jonathan Solís (Guatemala) Diana Corleto	(Canada) Nicolas Nguyen (Canada) Alexandra Mocanu
8 November	Guatemala Future Series: Host: Guatemala City, Guatemala; Venue: Gimnasio Teodoro Palacios Flores; Level: Future Series; Format: 32MS/32WS/8MD/16WD/16XD	Score: 18–21, 21–17, 21–15	
15 November	Indonesia Masters (Draw): Host: Badung Regency, Bali, Indonesia; Venue: Bali International Convention Center; Level: Super 750; Prize: US$600,000; Format: 32MS/32WS/32MD/32WD/32XD	(Japan) Kento Momota	(Denmark) Anders Antonsen
15 November	Indonesia Masters (Draw): Host: Badung Regency, Bali, Indonesia; Venue: Bali International Convention Center; Level: Super 750; Prize: US$600,000; Format: 32MS/32WS/32MD/32WD/32XD	Score: 21–17, 21–11	
15 November	Indonesia Masters (Draw): Host: Badung Regency, Bali, Indonesia; Venue: Bali International Convention Center; Level: Super 750; Prize: US$600,000; Format: 32MS/32WS/32MD/32WD/32XD	(South Korea) An Se-young	(Japan) Akane Yamaguchi
15 November	Indonesia Masters (Draw): Host: Badung Regency, Bali, Indonesia; Venue: Bali International Convention Center; Level: Super 750; Prize: US$600,000; Format: 32MS/32WS/32MD/32WD/32XD	Score: 21–17, 21–19	
15 November	Indonesia Masters (Draw): Host: Badung Regency, Bali, Indonesia; Venue: Bali International Convention Center; Level: Super 750; Prize: US$600,000; Format: 32MS/32WS/32MD/32WD/32XD	(Japan) Takuro Hoki (Japan) Yugo Kobayashi	(Indonesia) Marcus Fernaldi Gideon (Indonesia) Kevin Sanjaya Sukamuljo
15 November	Indonesia Masters (Draw): Host: Badung Regency, Bali, Indonesia; Venue: Bali International Convention Center; Level: Super 750; Prize: US$600,000; Format: 32MS/32WS/32MD/32WD/32XD	Score: 21–11, 17–21, 21–19	
15 November	Indonesia Masters (Draw): Host: Badung Regency, Bali, Indonesia; Venue: Bali International Convention Center; Level: Super 750; Prize: US$600,000; Format: 32MS/32WS/32MD/32WD/32XD	(Japan) Nami Matsuyama (Japan) Chiharu Shida	(South Korea) Jeong Na-eun (South Korea) Kim Hye-jeong
15 November	Indonesia Masters (Draw): Host: Badung Regency, Bali, Indonesia; Venue: Bali International Convention Center; Level: Super 750; Prize: US$600,000; Format: 32MS/32WS/32MD/32WD/32XD	Score: 21–9, 21–11	
15 November	Indonesia Masters (Draw): Host: Badung Regency, Bali, Indonesia; Venue: Bali International Convention Center; Level: Super 750; Prize: US$600,000; Format: 32MS/32WS/32MD/32WD/32XD	(Thailand) Dechapol Puavaranukroh (Thailand) Sapsiree Taerattanachai	(Hong Kong) Tang Chun Man (Hong Kong) Tse Ying Suet
15 November	Indonesia Masters (Draw): Host: Badung Regency, Bali, Indonesia; Venue: Bali International Convention Center; Level: Super 750; Prize: US$600,000; Format: 32MS/32WS/32MD/32WD/32XD	Score: 21–11, 21–12	
15 November	Hong Kong Open (Draw) (cancelled): Host: Hong Kong; Venue: Hong Kong Coliseum; Level: Super 500; Prize: $400,000; Format: 32MS/32WS/32MD/32WD/32XD		
15 November	Hong Kong Open (Draw) (cancelled): Host: Hong Kong; Venue: Hong Kong Coliseum; Level: Super 500; Prize: $400,000; Format: 32MS/32WS/32MD/32WD/32XD	Score:	
15 November	Hong Kong Open (Draw) (cancelled): Host: Hong Kong; Venue: Hong Kong Coliseum; Level: Super 500; Prize: $400,000; Format: 32MS/32WS/32MD/32WD/32XD	Score:	
15 November	Hong Kong Open (Draw) (cancelled): Host: Hong Kong; Venue: Hong Kong Coliseum; Level: Super 500; Prize: $400,000; Format: 32MS/32WS/32MD/32WD/32XD	Score:	
15 November	Hong Kong Open (Draw) (cancelled): Host: Hong Kong; Venue: Hong Kong Coliseum; Level: Super 500; Prize: $400,000; Format: 32MS/32WS/32MD/32WD/32XD	Score:	
15 November	Hong Kong Open (Draw) (cancelled): Host: Hong Kong; Venue: Hong Kong Coliseum; Level: Super 500; Prize: $400,000; Format: 32MS/32WS/32MD/32WD/32XD	Score:	
15 November	Irish Open: Host: Dublin, Ireland; Venue: National Indoor Arena; Level: International Challenge; Prize: $15,000; Format: 32MS/32WS/32MD/32WD/32XD	(Malaysia) Yeoh Seng Zoe	(Denmark) Mads Christophersen
15 November	Irish Open: Host: Dublin, Ireland; Venue: National Indoor Arena; Level: International Challenge; Prize: $15,000; Format: 32MS/32WS/32MD/32WD/32XD	Score: 21–18, 21–14	
15 November	Irish Open: Host: Dublin, Ireland; Venue: National Indoor Arena; Level: International Challenge; Prize: $15,000; Format: 32MS/32WS/32MD/32WD/32XD	(Chinese Taipei) Hsu Wen-chi	(Denmark) Line Kjærsfeldt
15 November	Irish Open: Host: Dublin, Ireland; Venue: National Indoor Arena; Level: International Challenge; Prize: $15,000; Format: 32MS/32WS/32MD/32WD/32XD	Score: 21–9, 14–21, 21–15	
15 November	Irish Open: Host: Dublin, Ireland; Venue: National Indoor Arena; Level: International Challenge; Prize: $15,000; Format: 32MS/32WS/32MD/32WD/32XD	(Malaysia) Man Wei Chong (Malaysia) Tee Kai Wun	(England) Rory Easton (England) Zach Russ
15 November	Irish Open: Host: Dublin, Ireland; Venue: National Indoor Arena; Level: International Challenge; Prize: $15,000; Format: 32MS/32WS/32MD/32WD/32XD	Score: 21–7, 21–17	
15 November	Irish Open: Host: Dublin, Ireland; Venue: National Indoor Arena; Level: International Challenge; Prize: $15,000; Format: 32MS/32WS/32MD/32WD/32XD	(Netherlands) Debora Jille (Netherlands) Cheryl Seinen	(Australia) Chen Hsuan-yu (Australia) Gronya Somerville
15 November	Irish Open: Host: Dublin, Ireland; Venue: National Indoor Arena; Level: International Challenge; Prize: $15,000; Format: 32MS/32WS/32MD/32WD/32XD	Score: 15–21, 21–14, 21–14	
15 November	Irish Open: Host: Dublin, Ireland; Venue: National Indoor Arena; Level: International Challenge; Prize: $15,000; Format: 32MS/32WS/32MD/32WD/32XD	(Netherlands) Robin Tabeling (Netherlands) Selena Piek	(Denmark) Mikkel Mikkelsen (Denmark) Rikke Søby Hansen
15 November	Irish Open: Host: Dublin, Ireland; Venue: National Indoor Arena; Level: International Challenge; Prize: $15,000; Format: 32MS/32WS/32MD/32WD/32XD	Score: 21–18, 21–15	
15 November	Bahrain International Series: Host: Manama, Bahrain; Venue: The India Club; Level: International Series; Prize: $5,000; Format: 32MS/16WS/16MD/16WD/16XD	(Indonesia) Bobby Setiabudi	(Hong Kong) Chan Yin Chak
15 November	Bahrain International Series: Host: Manama, Bahrain; Venue: The India Club; Level: International Series; Prize: $5,000; Format: 32MS/16WS/16MD/16WD/16XD	Score: 21–18, 11–21, 21–16	
15 November	Bahrain International Series: Host: Manama, Bahrain; Venue: The India Club; Level: International Series; Prize: $5,000; Format: 32MS/16WS/16MD/16WD/16XD	(Indonesia) Aisyah Sativa Fatetani	(Indonesia) Komang Ayu Cahya Dewi
15 November	Bahrain International Series: Host: Manama, Bahrain; Venue: The India Club; Level: International Series; Prize: $5,000; Format: 32MS/16WS/16MD/16WD/16XD	Score: 14–21, 21–14, 21–19	
15 November	Bahrain International Series: Host: Manama, Bahrain; Venue: The India Club; Level: International Series; Prize: $5,000; Format: 32MS/16WS/16MD/16WD/16XD	(Indonesia) Amri Syahnawi (Indonesia) Christopher David Wijaya	(Indonesia) Putra Erwiansyah (Indonesia) Patra Harapan Rindorindo
15 November	Bahrain International Series: Host: Manama, Bahrain; Venue: The India Club; Level: International Series; Prize: $5,000; Format: 32MS/16WS/16MD/16WD/16XD	Score: 21–13, 21–13	
15 November	Bahrain International Series: Host: Manama, Bahrain; Venue: The India Club; Level: International Series; Prize: $5,000; Format: 32MS/16WS/16MD/16WD/16XD	(Hong Kong) Yeung Nga Ting (Hong Kong) Yeung Pui Lam	(Hong Kong) Ng Tsz Yau (Hong Kong) Tsang Hiu Yan
15 November	Bahrain International Series: Host: Manama, Bahrain; Venue: The India Club; Level: International Series; Prize: $5,000; Format: 32MS/16WS/16MD/16WD/16XD	Score: 21–13, 21–18	
15 November	Bahrain International Series: Host: Manama, Bahrain; Venue: The India Club; Level: International Series; Prize: $5,000; Format: 32MS/16WS/16MD/16WD/16XD	(Hong Kong) Lee Chun Hei (Hong Kong) Ng Tsz Yau	(Hong Kong) Law Cheuk Him (Hong Kong) Yeung Nga Ting
15 November	Bahrain International Series: Host: Manama, Bahrain; Venue: The India Club; Level: International Series; Prize: $5,000; Format: 32MS/16WS/16MD/16WD/16XD	Score: 23–21, 21–12	
22 November	Indonesia Open (Draw): Host: Badung Regency, Bali, Indonesia; Venue: Bali International Convention Center; Level: Super 1000; Prize: $850,000; Format: 32MS/32WS/32MD/32WD/32XD	(Denmark) Viktor Axelsen	(Singapore) Loh Kean Yew
22 November	Indonesia Open (Draw): Host: Badung Regency, Bali, Indonesia; Venue: Bali International Convention Center; Level: Super 1000; Prize: $850,000; Format: 32MS/32WS/32MD/32WD/32XD	Score: 21–13, 9–21, 21–13	
22 November	Indonesia Open (Draw): Host: Badung Regency, Bali, Indonesia; Venue: Bali International Convention Center; Level: Super 1000; Prize: $850,000; Format: 32MS/32WS/32MD/32WD/32XD	(South Korea) An Se-young	(Thailand) Ratchanok Intanon
22 November	Indonesia Open (Draw): Host: Badung Regency, Bali, Indonesia; Venue: Bali International Convention Center; Level: Super 1000; Prize: $850,000; Format: 32MS/32WS/32MD/32WD/32XD	Score: 21–17, 22–20	
22 November	Indonesia Open (Draw): Host: Badung Regency, Bali, Indonesia; Venue: Bali International Convention Center; Level: Super 1000; Prize: $850,000; Format: 32MS/32WS/32MD/32WD/32XD	(Indonesia) Marcus Fernaldi Gideon (Indonesia) Kevin Sanjaya Sukamuljo	(Japan) Takuro Hoki (Japan) Yugo Kobayashi
22 November	Indonesia Open (Draw): Host: Badung Regency, Bali, Indonesia; Venue: Bali International Convention Center; Level: Super 1000; Prize: $850,000; Format: 32MS/32WS/32MD/32WD/32XD	Score: 21–14, 21–18	
22 November	Indonesia Open (Draw): Host: Badung Regency, Bali, Indonesia; Venue: Bali International Convention Center; Level: Super 1000; Prize: $850,000; Format: 32MS/32WS/32MD/32WD/32XD	(Japan) Nami Matsuyama (Japan) Chiharu Shida	(Indonesia) Greysia Polii (Indonesia) Apriyani Rahayu
22 November	Indonesia Open (Draw): Host: Badung Regency, Bali, Indonesia; Venue: Bali International Convention Center; Level: Super 1000; Prize: $850,000; Format: 32MS/32WS/32MD/32WD/32XD	Score: 21–19, 21–19	
22 November	Indonesia Open (Draw): Host: Badung Regency, Bali, Indonesia; Venue: Bali International Convention Center; Level: Super 1000; Prize: $850,000; Format: 32MS/32WS/32MD/32WD/32XD	(Thailand) Dechapol Puavaranukroh (Thailand) Sapsiree Taerattanachai	(Japan) Yuta Watanabe (Japan) Arisa Higashino
22 November	Indonesia Open (Draw): Host: Badung Regency, Bali, Indonesia; Venue: Bali International Convention Center; Level: Super 1000; Prize: $850,000; Format: 32MS/32WS/32MD/32WD/32XD	Score: 21–12, 21–13	
22 November	Bahrain International Challenge: Host: Manama, Bahrain; Venue: The Bahrain Keraleeya Samajam; Level: International Challenge; Prize: $15,000; Format: 32MS/16WS/16MD/16WD/16XD	(Indonesia) Ikhsan Rumbay	(Singapore) Jason Teh
22 November	Bahrain International Challenge: Host: Manama, Bahrain; Venue: The Bahrain Keraleeya Samajam; Level: International Challenge; Prize: $15,000; Format: 32MS/16WS/16MD/16WD/16XD	Score: 21–18, 21–15	
22 November	Bahrain International Challenge: Host: Manama, Bahrain; Venue: The Bahrain Keraleeya Samajam; Level: International Challenge; Prize: $15,000; Format: 32MS/16WS/16MD/16WD/16XD	(United States) Lauren Lam	(Indonesia) Asty Dwi Widyaningrum
22 November	Bahrain International Challenge: Host: Manama, Bahrain; Venue: The Bahrain Keraleeya Samajam; Level: International Challenge; Prize: $15,000; Format: 32MS/16WS/16MD/16WD/16XD	Score: 21–18, 21–10	
22 November	Bahrain International Challenge: Host: Manama, Bahrain; Venue: The Bahrain Keraleeya Samajam; Level: International Challenge; Prize: $15,000; Format: 32MS/16WS/16MD/16WD/16XD	(Indonesia) Raymond Indra (Indonesia) Daniel Edgar Marvino	(Indonesia) Amri Syahnawi (Indonesia) Christopher David Wijaya
22 November	Bahrain International Challenge: Host: Manama, Bahrain; Venue: The Bahrain Keraleeya Samajam; Level: International Challenge; Prize: $15,000; Format: 32MS/16WS/16MD/16WD/16XD	Score: 22–20, 18–21, 22–20	
22 November	Bahrain International Challenge: Host: Manama, Bahrain; Venue: The Bahrain Keraleeya Samajam; Level: International Challenge; Prize: $15,000; Format: 32MS/16WS/16MD/16WD/16XD	(Hong Kong) Yeung Nga Ting (Hong Kong) Yeung Pui Lam	(Hong Kong) Ng Tsz Yau (Hong Kong) Tsang Hiu Yan
22 November	Bahrain International Challenge: Host: Manama, Bahrain; Venue: The Bahrain Keraleeya Samajam; Level: International Challenge; Prize: $15,000; Format: 32MS/16WS/16MD/16WD/16XD	Score: 21–12, 21–18	
22 November	Bahrain International Challenge: Host: Manama, Bahrain; Venue: The Bahrain Keraleeya Samajam; Level: International Challenge; Prize: $15,000; Format: 32MS/16WS/16MD/16WD/16XD	(Hong Kong) Law Cheuk Him (Hong Kong) Yeung Nga Ting	(Indonesia) Akbar Bintang Cahyono (Indonesia) Winny Oktavina Kandow
22 November	Bahrain International Challenge: Host: Manama, Bahrain; Venue: The Bahrain Keraleeya Samajam; Level: International Challenge; Prize: $15,000; Format: 32MS/16WS/16MD/16WD/16XD	Score: 11–21, 21–13, 21–11	
22 November	Scottish Open: Host: Glasgow, Scotland; Venue: Emirates Arena; Level: International Challenge; Prize: $15,000; Format: 32MS/32WS/32MD/32WD/32XD	(Malaysia) Ng Tze Yong	(Malaysia) Soong Joo Ven
22 November	Scottish Open: Host: Glasgow, Scotland; Venue: Emirates Arena; Level: International Challenge; Prize: $15,000; Format: 32MS/32WS/32MD/32WD/32XD	Score: 21–18, 21–14	
22 November	Scottish Open: Host: Glasgow, Scotland; Venue: Emirates Arena; Level: International Challenge; Prize: $15,000; Format: 32MS/32WS/32MD/32WD/32XD	(Chinese Taipei) Hsu Wen-chi	(Denmark) Line Kjærsfeldt
22 November	Scottish Open: Host: Glasgow, Scotland; Venue: Emirates Arena; Level: International Challenge; Prize: $15,000; Format: 32MS/32WS/32MD/32WD/32XD	Score: 21–15, 21–18	
22 November	Scottish Open: Host: Glasgow, Scotland; Venue: Emirates Arena; Level: International Challenge; Prize: $15,000; Format: 32MS/32WS/32MD/32WD/32XD	(Scotland) Christopher Grimley (Scotland) Matthew Grimley	(Malaysia) Junaidi Arif (Malaysia) Muhammad Haikal
22 November	Scottish Open: Host: Glasgow, Scotland; Venue: Emirates Arena; Level: International Challenge; Prize: $15,000; Format: 32MS/32WS/32MD/32WD/32XD	Score: 22–20, 21–16	
22 November	Scottish Open: Host: Glasgow, Scotland; Venue: Emirates Arena; Level: International Challenge; Prize: $15,000; Format: 32MS/32WS/32MD/32WD/32XD	(Canada) Rachel Honderich (Canada) Kristen Tsai	(Malaysia) Anna Cheong (Malaysia) Teoh Mei Xing
22 November	Scottish Open: Host: Glasgow, Scotland; Venue: Emirates Arena; Level: International Challenge; Prize: $15,000; Format: 32MS/32WS/32MD/32WD/32XD	Score: 21–14, 21–12	
22 November	Scottish Open: Host: Glasgow, Scotland; Venue: Emirates Arena; Level: International Challenge; Prize: $15,000; Format: 32MS/32WS/32MD/32WD/32XD	(England) Callum Hemming (England) Jessica Pugh	(India) Ishaan Bhatnagar (India) Tanisha Crasto
22 November	Scottish Open: Host: Glasgow, Scotland; Venue: Emirates Arena; Level: International Challenge; Prize: $15,000; Format: 32MS/32WS/32MD/32WD/32XD	Score: 21–15, 21–17	
22 November	Slovenia Future Series: Host: Brežice, Slovenia; Venue: Sporthall Brežice; Level: Future Series; Format: 32MS/32WS/32MD/32WD/32XD	(Indonesia) Andi Fadel Muhammad	(Italy) Giovanni Toti
22 November	Slovenia Future Series: Host: Brežice, Slovenia; Venue: Sporthall Brežice; Level: Future Series; Format: 32MS/32WS/32MD/32WD/32XD	Score: 21–13, 21–12	
22 November	Slovenia Future Series: Host: Brežice, Slovenia; Venue: Sporthall Brežice; Level: Future Series; Format: 32MS/32WS/32MD/32WD/32XD	(Denmark) Simona Pilgaard	(India) Rhucha Sawant
22 November	Slovenia Future Series: Host: Brežice, Slovenia; Venue: Sporthall Brežice; Level: Future Series; Format: 32MS/32WS/32MD/32WD/32XD	Score: 21–17, 17–21, 21–11	
22 November	Slovenia Future Series: Host: Brežice, Slovenia; Venue: Sporthall Brežice; Level: Future Series; Format: 32MS/32WS/32MD/32WD/32XD	(Denmark) William Kryger Boe (Denmark) Christian Faust Kjær	(Denmark) Jakob Houe (Denmark) Mads Juel Møller
22 November	Slovenia Future Series: Host: Brežice, Slovenia; Venue: Sporthall Brežice; Level: Future Series; Format: 32MS/32WS/32MD/32WD/32XD	Score: 21–14, 21–14	
22 November	Slovenia Future Series: Host: Brežice, Slovenia; Venue: Sporthall Brežice; Level: Future Series; Format: 32MS/32WS/32MD/32WD/32XD	(Russia) Viktoriia Kozyreva (Russia) Mariia Sukhova	(Slovenia) Nika Arih (Slovenia) Lia Šalehar
22 November	Slovenia Future Series: Host: Brežice, Slovenia; Venue: Sporthall Brežice; Level: Future Series; Format: 32MS/32WS/32MD/32WD/32XD	Score: 21–10, 14–21, 21–17	
22 November	Slovenia Future Series: Host: Brežice, Slovenia; Venue: Sporthall Brežice; Level: Future Series; Format: 32MS/32WS/32MD/32WD/32XD	(Denmark) Mads Muurholm (Denmark) Clara Løber	(Denmark) Jacob Hougaard (Denmark) Frederikke Østergaard
22 November	Slovenia Future Series: Host: Brežice, Slovenia; Venue: Sporthall Brežice; Level: Future Series; Format: 32MS/32WS/32MD/32WD/32XD	Score: 21–19, 21–18	
22 November	Botswana International: Host: Lobatse, Botswana; Venue: Lobatse Sports Complex; Level: Future Series; Format: 32MS/32WS/32MD/16WD/32XD	(India) Farogh Sanjay Aman	(India) Naren Shankar Iyer
22 November	Botswana International: Host: Lobatse, Botswana; Venue: Lobatse Sports Complex; Level: Future Series; Format: 32MS/32WS/32MD/16WD/32XD	Score: 25–23, 19–21, 23–21	
22 November	Botswana International: Host: Lobatse, Botswana; Venue: Lobatse Sports Complex; Level: Future Series; Format: 32MS/32WS/32MD/16WD/32XD	(India) Revati Devasthale	(South Africa) Johanita Scholtz
22 November	Botswana International: Host: Lobatse, Botswana; Venue: Lobatse Sports Complex; Level: Future Series; Format: 32MS/32WS/32MD/16WD/32XD	Score: 18–21, 21–13, 21–13	
22 November	Botswana International: Host: Lobatse, Botswana; Venue: Lobatse Sports Complex; Level: Future Series; Format: 32MS/32WS/32MD/16WD/32XD	(South Africa) Jarred Elliott (South Africa) Robert Summers	(Kazakhstan) Artur Niyazov (Kazakhstan) Dmitriy Panarin
22 November	Botswana International: Host: Lobatse, Botswana; Venue: Lobatse Sports Complex; Level: Future Series; Format: 32MS/32WS/32MD/16WD/32XD	Score: 21–19, 13–21, 21–6	
22 November	Botswana International: Host: Lobatse, Botswana; Venue: Lobatse Sports Complex; Level: Future Series; Format: 32MS/32WS/32MD/16WD/32XD	(South Africa) Amy Ackerman (South Africa) Johanita Scholtz	(Kazakhstan) Kamila Smagulova (Kazakhstan) Aisha Zhumabek
22 November	Botswana International: Host: Lobatse, Botswana; Venue: Lobatse Sports Complex; Level: Future Series; Format: 32MS/32WS/32MD/16WD/32XD	Score: 21–9, 21–10	
22 November	Botswana International: Host: Lobatse, Botswana; Venue: Lobatse Sports Complex; Level: Future Series; Format: 32MS/32WS/32MD/16WD/32XD	(Kazakhstan) Dmitriy Panarin (Kazakhstan) Kamila Smagulova	(Kazakhstan) Artur Niyazov (Kazakhstan) Aisha Zhumabek
22 November	Botswana International: Host: Lobatse, Botswana; Venue: Lobatse Sports Complex; Level: Future Series; Format: 32MS/32WS/32MD/16WD/32XD	Score: 21–16, 21–18	
29 November	BWF World Tour Finals (Draw): Host: Badung Regency, Bali, Indonesia; Venue: Bali International Convention Center; Level: World Tour Finals; Prize: $1,500,000; Format: 8MS/8WS/8MD/8WD/8XD	(Denmark) Viktor Axelsen	(Thailand) Kunlavut Vitidsarn
29 November	BWF World Tour Finals (Draw): Host: Badung Regency, Bali, Indonesia; Venue: Bali International Convention Center; Level: World Tour Finals; Prize: $1,500,000; Format: 8MS/8WS/8MD/8WD/8XD	Score: 21–12, 21–8	
29 November	BWF World Tour Finals (Draw): Host: Badung Regency, Bali, Indonesia; Venue: Bali International Convention Center; Level: World Tour Finals; Prize: $1,500,000; Format: 8MS/8WS/8MD/8WD/8XD	(South Korea) An Se-young	(India) P. V. Sindhu
29 November	BWF World Tour Finals (Draw): Host: Badung Regency, Bali, Indonesia; Venue: Bali International Convention Center; Level: World Tour Finals; Prize: $1,500,000; Format: 8MS/8WS/8MD/8WD/8XD	Score: 21–16, 21–12	
29 November	BWF World Tour Finals (Draw): Host: Badung Regency, Bali, Indonesia; Venue: Bali International Convention Center; Level: World Tour Finals; Prize: $1,500,000; Format: 8MS/8WS/8MD/8WD/8XD	(Japan) Takuro Hoki (Japan) Yugo Kobayashi	(Indonesia) Marcus Fernaldi Gideon (Indonesia) Kevin Sanjaya Sukamuljo
29 November	BWF World Tour Finals (Draw): Host: Badung Regency, Bali, Indonesia; Venue: Bali International Convention Center; Level: World Tour Finals; Prize: $1,500,000; Format: 8MS/8WS/8MD/8WD/8XD	Score: 21–16, 13–21, 21–17	
29 November	BWF World Tour Finals (Draw): Host: Badung Regency, Bali, Indonesia; Venue: Bali International Convention Center; Level: World Tour Finals; Prize: $1,500,000; Format: 8MS/8WS/8MD/8WD/8XD	(South Korea) Kim So-yeong (South Korea) Kong Hee-yong	(Japan) Nami Matsuyama (Japan) Chiharu Shida
29 November	BWF World Tour Finals (Draw): Host: Badung Regency, Bali, Indonesia; Venue: Bali International Convention Center; Level: World Tour Finals; Prize: $1,500,000; Format: 8MS/8WS/8MD/8WD/8XD	Score: 21–14, 21–14	
29 November	BWF World Tour Finals (Draw): Host: Badung Regency, Bali, Indonesia; Venue: Bali International Convention Center; Level: World Tour Finals; Prize: $1,500,000; Format: 8MS/8WS/8MD/8WD/8XD	(Thailand) Dechapol Puavaranukroh (Thailand) Sapsiree Taerattanachai	(Japan) Yuta Watanabe (Japan) Arisa Higashino
29 November	BWF World Tour Finals (Draw): Host: Badung Regency, Bali, Indonesia; Venue: Bali International Convention Center; Level: World Tour Finals; Prize: $1,500,000; Format: 8MS/8WS/8MD/8WD/8XD	Score: 21–19, 21–11	
29 November	Indonesia International Challenge (Cancelled): Host: Badung Regency, Bali, Indonesia; Venue: Bali International Convention Center; Level: International Challenge; Prize: $75,000; Format: TBD		
29 November	Indonesia International Challenge (Cancelled): Host: Badung Regency, Bali, Indonesia; Venue: Bali International Convention Center; Level: International Challenge; Prize: $75,000; Format: TBD	Score:	
29 November	Indonesia International Challenge (Cancelled): Host: Badung Regency, Bali, Indonesia; Venue: Bali International Convention Center; Level: International Challenge; Prize: $75,000; Format: TBD	Score:	
29 November	Indonesia International Challenge (Cancelled): Host: Badung Regency, Bali, Indonesia; Venue: Bali International Convention Center; Level: International Challenge; Prize: $75,000; Format: TBD	Score:	
29 November	Indonesia International Challenge (Cancelled): Host: Badung Regency, Bali, Indonesia; Venue: Bali International Convention Center; Level: International Challenge; Prize: $75,000; Format: TBD	Score:	
29 November	Indonesia International Challenge (Cancelled): Host: Badung Regency, Bali, Indonesia; Venue: Bali International Convention Center; Level: International Challenge; Prize: $75,000; Format: TBD	Score:	
29 November	Bangladesh International: Host: Dhaka, Bangladesh; Venue: Shahid Tajuddin Ahmed Indoor Stadium; Level: International Challenge; Prize: $15,000; Format: 64MS/32WS/16MD/8WD/16XD	(India) Abhishek Saini	(India) Rithvik Sanjeevi
29 November	Bangladesh International: Host: Dhaka, Bangladesh; Venue: Shahid Tajuddin Ahmed Indoor Stadium; Level: International Challenge; Prize: $15,000; Format: 64MS/32WS/16MD/8WD/16XD	Score: 21–15, 21–1	
29 November	Bangladesh International: Host: Dhaka, Bangladesh; Venue: Shahid Tajuddin Ahmed Indoor Stadium; Level: International Challenge; Prize: $15,000; Format: 64MS/32WS/16MD/8WD/16XD	(Indonesia) Putri Kusuma Wardani	(Indonesia) Tasya Farahnailah
29 November	Bangladesh International: Host: Dhaka, Bangladesh; Venue: Shahid Tajuddin Ahmed Indoor Stadium; Level: International Challenge; Prize: $15,000; Format: 64MS/32WS/16MD/8WD/16XD	Score: 21–12, 21–8	
29 November	Bangladesh International: Host: Dhaka, Bangladesh; Venue: Shahid Tajuddin Ahmed Indoor Stadium; Level: International Challenge; Prize: $15,000; Format: 64MS/32WS/16MD/8WD/16XD	(Sri Lanka) Sachin Dias (Sri Lanka) Buwaneka Goonethilleka	(India) Bokka Navaneeth (India) Srikrishna Sai Kumar Podile
29 November	Bangladesh International: Host: Dhaka, Bangladesh; Venue: Shahid Tajuddin Ahmed Indoor Stadium; Level: International Challenge; Prize: $15,000; Format: 64MS/32WS/16MD/8WD/16XD	Score: 21–15, 21–9	
29 November	Bangladesh International: Host: Dhaka, Bangladesh; Venue: Shahid Tajuddin Ahmed Indoor Stadium; Level: International Challenge; Prize: $15,000; Format: 64MS/32WS/16MD/8WD/16XD	(India) Mehreen Riza (India) Arathi Sara Sunil	(Malaysia) Kasturi Radhakrishnan (Malaysia) Venosha Radhakrishnan
29 November	Bangladesh International: Host: Dhaka, Bangladesh; Venue: Shahid Tajuddin Ahmed Indoor Stadium; Level: International Challenge; Prize: $15,000; Format: 64MS/32WS/16MD/8WD/16XD	Score: 22–20 21–12	
29 November	Bangladesh International: Host: Dhaka, Bangladesh; Venue: Shahid Tajuddin Ahmed Indoor Stadium; Level: International Challenge; Prize: $15,000; Format: 64MS/32WS/16MD/8WD/16XD	(Sri Lanka) Sachin Dias (Sri Lanka) Kavidi Sirimannage	(India) Pratik Ranade (India) Akshaya Warang
29 November	Bangladesh International: Host: Dhaka, Bangladesh; Venue: Shahid Tajuddin Ahmed Indoor Stadium; Level: International Challenge; Prize: $15,000; Format: 64MS/32WS/16MD/8WD/16XD	Score: 21–15, 21–18	
29 November	Welsh International: Host: Cardiff, Wales; Venue: Sport Wales National Centre; Level: International Challenge; Prize: $15,000; Format: 32MS/32WS/32MD/32WD/32XD	(France) Arnaud Merklé	(India) Siril Verma
29 November	Welsh International: Host: Cardiff, Wales; Venue: Sport Wales National Centre; Level: International Challenge; Prize: $15,000; Format: 32MS/32WS/32MD/32WD/32XD	Score: 21–14, 11–21, 21–15	
29 November	Welsh International: Host: Cardiff, Wales; Venue: Sport Wales National Centre; Level: International Challenge; Prize: $15,000; Format: 32MS/32WS/32MD/32WD/32XD	(Chinese Taipei) Hsu Wen-chi	(Canada) Wen Yu Zhang
29 November	Welsh International: Host: Cardiff, Wales; Venue: Sport Wales National Centre; Level: International Challenge; Prize: $15,000; Format: 32MS/32WS/32MD/32WD/32XD	Score: 22–20, 21–15	
29 November	Welsh International: Host: Cardiff, Wales; Venue: Sport Wales National Centre; Level: International Challenge; Prize: $15,000; Format: 32MS/32WS/32MD/32WD/32XD	(South Korea) Kim Gi-jung (South Korea) Kim Sa-rang	(Malaysia) Man Wei Chong (Malaysia) Tee Kai Wun
29 November	Welsh International: Host: Cardiff, Wales; Venue: Sport Wales National Centre; Level: International Challenge; Prize: $15,000; Format: 32MS/32WS/32MD/32WD/32XD	Score: 21–18, 18–21, 21–15	
29 November	Welsh International: Host: Cardiff, Wales; Venue: Sport Wales National Centre; Level: International Challenge; Prize: $15,000; Format: 32MS/32WS/32MD/32WD/32XD	(France) Margot Lambert (France) Anne Tran	(India) Treesa Jolly (India) Gayathri Gopichand
29 November	Welsh International: Host: Cardiff, Wales; Venue: Sport Wales National Centre; Level: International Challenge; Prize: $15,000; Format: 32MS/32WS/32MD/32WD/32XD	Score: 22–20, 17–21, 21–14	
29 November	Welsh International: Host: Cardiff, Wales; Venue: Sport Wales National Centre; Level: International Challenge; Prize: $15,000; Format: 32MS/32WS/32MD/32WD/32XD	(France) William Villeger (France) Anne Tran	(England) Callum Hemming (England) Jessica Pugh
29 November	Welsh International: Host: Cardiff, Wales; Venue: Sport Wales National Centre; Level: International Challenge; Prize: $15,000; Format: 32MS/32WS/32MD/32WD/32XD	Score: 21–15, 17–21, 21–16	
29 November	South Africa International: Host: Johannesburg, South Africa; Venue: John Barrable Hall; Level: Future Series; Format: 32MS/32WS/16MD/16WD/32XD	(India) Farogh Sanjay Aman	(South Africa) Robert Summers
29 November	South Africa International: Host: Johannesburg, South Africa; Venue: John Barrable Hall; Level: Future Series; Format: 32MS/32WS/16MD/16WD/32XD	Score: 15–21, 21–16, 21–12	
29 November	South Africa International: Host: Johannesburg, South Africa; Venue: John Barrable Hall; Level: Future Series; Format: 32MS/32WS/16MD/16WD/32XD	(South Africa) Johanita Scholtz	(South Africa) Deidre Laurens Jordaan
29 November	South Africa International: Host: Johannesburg, South Africa; Venue: John Barrable Hall; Level: Future Series; Format: 32MS/32WS/16MD/16WD/32XD	Score: 21–10, 21–11	
29 November	South Africa International: Host: Johannesburg, South Africa; Venue: John Barrable Hall; Level: Future Series; Format: 32MS/32WS/16MD/16WD/32XD	(South Africa) Jarred Elliott (South Africa) Robert Summers	(South Africa) Caden Kakora (South Africa) Robert White
29 November	South Africa International: Host: Johannesburg, South Africa; Venue: John Barrable Hall; Level: Future Series; Format: 32MS/32WS/16MD/16WD/32XD	Score: 21–15, 9–21, 21–15	
29 November	South Africa International: Host: Johannesburg, South Africa; Venue: John Barrable Hall; Level: Future Series; Format: 32MS/32WS/16MD/16WD/32XD	(South Africa) Amy Ackerman (South Africa) Johanita Scholtz	(South Africa) Megan De Beer (South Africa) Deidre Laurens Jordaan
29 November	South Africa International: Host: Johannesburg, South Africa; Venue: John Barrable Hall; Level: Future Series; Format: 32MS/32WS/16MD/16WD/32XD	Score: 21–17, 21–11	
29 November	South Africa International: Host: Johannesburg, South Africa; Venue: John Barrable Hall; Level: Future Series; Format: 32MS/32WS/16MD/16WD/32XD	(South Africa) Robert White (South Africa) Deidre Laurens Jordaan	(South Africa) Jarred Elliott (South Africa) Amy Ackerman
29 November	South Africa International: Host: Johannesburg, South Africa; Venue: John Barrable Hall; Level: Future Series; Format: 32MS/32WS/16MD/16WD/32XD	Score: Walkover	

=== December ===
Week commencing	Tournament	Champions	Runners-up
6 December	Vietnam International Series (cancelled) (Note: Tournament cancelled due to the COVID-19 pandemic on 8 October 2021.): Host: Danang, Vietnam; Venue: Tien Son Sports Complex; Level: International Series; Prize: $10,000; Format: TBD		
6 December	Vietnam International Series (cancelled): Host: Danang, Vietnam; Venue: Tien Son Sports Complex; Level: International Series; Prize: $10,000; Format: TBD	Score:	
6 December	Vietnam International Series (cancelled): Host: Danang, Vietnam; Venue: Tien Son Sports Complex; Level: International Series; Prize: $10,000; Format: TBD	Score:	
6 December	Vietnam International Series (cancelled): Host: Danang, Vietnam; Venue: Tien Son Sports Complex; Level: International Series; Prize: $10,000; Format: TBD	Score:	
6 December	Vietnam International Series (cancelled): Host: Danang, Vietnam; Venue: Tien Son Sports Complex; Level: International Series; Prize: $10,000; Format: TBD	Score:	
6 December	Vietnam International Series (cancelled): Host: Danang, Vietnam; Venue: Tien Son Sports Complex; Level: International Series; Prize: $10,000; Format: TBD	Score:	
6 December	Internacional Mexicano: Host: Guadalajara, Mexico; Venue: Polideportivo Manuel Avila Camacho; Level: International Series; Prize: $5,000; Format: 32MS/32WS/32MD/16WD/32XD	(Ukraine) Danylo Bosniuk	(Mexico) Job Castillo
6 December	Internacional Mexicano: Host: Guadalajara, Mexico; Venue: Polideportivo Manuel Avila Camacho; Level: International Series; Prize: $5,000; Format: 32MS/32WS/32MD/16WD/32XD	Score: 21–12, 21–13	
6 December	Internacional Mexicano: Host: Guadalajara, Mexico; Venue: Polideportivo Manuel Avila Camacho; Level: International Series; Prize: $5,000; Format: 32MS/32WS/32MD/16WD/32XD	(United States) Lauren Lam	(United States) Jennie Gai
6 December	Internacional Mexicano: Host: Guadalajara, Mexico; Venue: Polideportivo Manuel Avila Camacho; Level: International Series; Prize: $5,000; Format: 32MS/32WS/32MD/16WD/32XD	Score: 21–9, 21–15	
6 December	Internacional Mexicano: Host: Guadalajara, Mexico; Venue: Polideportivo Manuel Avila Camacho; Level: International Series; Prize: $5,000; Format: 32MS/32WS/32MD/16WD/32XD	(Canada) Adam Dong (Canada) Nyl Yakura	(Italy) Fabio Caponio (Italy) Giovanni Toti
6 December	Internacional Mexicano: Host: Guadalajara, Mexico; Venue: Polideportivo Manuel Avila Camacho; Level: International Series; Prize: $5,000; Format: 32MS/32WS/32MD/16WD/32XD	Score: 21–10, 21–10	
6 December	Internacional Mexicano: Host: Guadalajara, Mexico; Venue: Polideportivo Manuel Avila Camacho; Level: International Series; Prize: $5,000; Format: 32MS/32WS/32MD/16WD/32XD	(India) Srivedya Gurazada (United States) Ishika Jaiswal	(Canada) Crystal Lai (Canada) Alexandra Mocanu
6 December	Internacional Mexicano: Host: Guadalajara, Mexico; Venue: Polideportivo Manuel Avila Camacho; Level: International Series; Prize: $5,000; Format: 32MS/32WS/32MD/16WD/32XD	Score: 20–22, 21–17, 21–16	
6 December	Internacional Mexicano: Host: Guadalajara, Mexico; Venue: Polideportivo Manuel Avila Camacho; Level: International Series; Prize: $5,000; Format: 32MS/32WS/32MD/16WD/32XD	(United States) Vinson Chiu (United States) Jennie Gai	(Canada) Nicolas Nguyen (Canada) Alexandra Mocanu
6 December	Internacional Mexicano: Host: Guadalajara, Mexico; Venue: Polideportivo Manuel Avila Camacho; Level: International Series; Prize: $5,000; Format: 32MS/32WS/32MD/16WD/32XD	Score: 21–13, 21–11	
13 December	World Championships (Draw): Host: Huelva, Spain; Venue: Palacio de los Deportes Carolina Marín; Level: World Championships; Prize: N/A; Format: 64MS/48WS/48MD/48WD/48XD	(Singapore) Loh Kean Yew	(India) Srikanth Kidambi
13 December	World Championships (Draw): Host: Huelva, Spain; Venue: Palacio de los Deportes Carolina Marín; Level: World Championships; Prize: N/A; Format: 64MS/48WS/48MD/48WD/48XD	Score: 21–15, 22–20	
13 December	World Championships (Draw): Host: Huelva, Spain; Venue: Palacio de los Deportes Carolina Marín; Level: World Championships; Prize: N/A; Format: 64MS/48WS/48MD/48WD/48XD	(Japan) Akane Yamaguchi	(Chinese Taipei) Tai Tzu-ying
13 December	World Championships (Draw): Host: Huelva, Spain; Venue: Palacio de los Deportes Carolina Marín; Level: World Championships; Prize: N/A; Format: 64MS/48WS/48MD/48WD/48XD	Score: 21–14, 21–11	
13 December	World Championships (Draw): Host: Huelva, Spain; Venue: Palacio de los Deportes Carolina Marín; Level: World Championships; Prize: N/A; Format: 64MS/48WS/48MD/48WD/48XD	(Japan) Takuro Hoki (Japan) Yugo Kobayashi	(China) He Jiting (China) Tan Qiang
13 December	World Championships (Draw): Host: Huelva, Spain; Venue: Palacio de los Deportes Carolina Marín; Level: World Championships; Prize: N/A; Format: 64MS/48WS/48MD/48WD/48XD	Score: 21–12, 21–18	
13 December	World Championships (Draw): Host: Huelva, Spain; Venue: Palacio de los Deportes Carolina Marín; Level: World Championships; Prize: N/A; Format: 64MS/48WS/48MD/48WD/48XD	(China) Chen Qingchen (China) Jia Yifan	(South Korea) Lee So-hee (South Korea) Shin Seung-chan
13 December	World Championships (Draw): Host: Huelva, Spain; Venue: Palacio de los Deportes Carolina Marín; Level: World Championships; Prize: N/A; Format: 64MS/48WS/48MD/48WD/48XD	Score: 21–16, 21–17	
13 December	World Championships (Draw): Host: Huelva, Spain; Venue: Palacio de los Deportes Carolina Marín; Level: World Championships; Prize: N/A; Format: 64MS/48WS/48MD/48WD/48XD	(Thailand) Dechapol Puavaranukroh (Thailand) Sapsiree Taerattanachai	(Japan) Yuta Watanabe (Japan) Arisa Higashino
13 December	World Championships (Draw): Host: Huelva, Spain; Venue: Palacio de los Deportes Carolina Marín; Level: World Championships; Prize: N/A; Format: 64MS/48WS/48MD/48WD/48XD	Score: 21–13, 21–14	
13 December	Italian International: Host: Milan, Italy; Venue: PalaBadminton; Level: International Series; Prize: $5,000; Format: 32MS/32WS/32MD/32WD/32XD	(France) Alex Lanier	(Czech Republic) Jan Louda
13 December	Italian International: Host: Milan, Italy; Venue: PalaBadminton; Level: International Series; Prize: $5,000; Format: 32MS/32WS/32MD/32WD/32XD	Score: 21–12, 18–21, 21–11	
13 December	Italian International: Host: Milan, Italy; Venue: PalaBadminton; Level: International Series; Prize: $5,000; Format: 32MS/32WS/32MD/32WD/32XD	(Sweden) Edith Urell	(Ukraine) Polina Buhrova
13 December	Italian International: Host: Milan, Italy; Venue: PalaBadminton; Level: International Series; Prize: $5,000; Format: 32MS/32WS/32MD/32WD/32XD	Score: 18–21, 21–18, 21–18	
13 December	Italian International: Host: Milan, Italy; Venue: PalaBadminton; Level: International Series; Prize: $5,000; Format: 32MS/32WS/32MD/32WD/32XD	(Denmark) Kristian Kræmer (Denmark) Marcus Rindshøj	(Denmark) William Kryger Boe (Denmark) Christian Faust Kjær
13 December	Italian International: Host: Milan, Italy; Venue: PalaBadminton; Level: International Series; Prize: $5,000; Format: 32MS/32WS/32MD/32WD/32XD	Score: 21–18, 21–19	
13 December	Italian International: Host: Milan, Italy; Venue: PalaBadminton; Level: International Series; Prize: $5,000; Format: 32MS/32WS/32MD/32WD/32XD	(Germany) Stine Küspert (Germany) Emma Moszczynski	(Germany) Annabella Jäger (Germany) Leona Michalski
13 December	Italian International: Host: Milan, Italy; Venue: PalaBadminton; Level: International Series; Prize: $5,000; Format: 32MS/32WS/32MD/32WD/32XD	Score: 21–9, 21–10	
13 December	Italian International: Host: Milan, Italy; Venue: PalaBadminton; Level: International Series; Prize: $5,000; Format: 32MS/32WS/32MD/32WD/32XD	(Denmark) Jesper Toft (Denmark) Clara Graversen	(England) Rory Easton (England) Annie Lado
13 December	Italian International: Host: Milan, Italy; Venue: PalaBadminton; Level: International Series; Prize: $5,000; Format: 32MS/32WS/32MD/32WD/32XD	Score: 21–19, 21–16	
13 December	El Salvador International: Host: San Salvador, El Salvador; Venue: Palacio Nacional de los Deportes "Carlos el Famoso Hernández"; Level: International Series; Prize: $5,000; Format: 32MS/32WS/32MD/16WD/32XD	(El Salvador) Uriel Canjura	(Brazil) Donnians Oliveira
13 December	El Salvador International: Host: San Salvador, El Salvador; Venue: Palacio Nacional de los Deportes "Carlos el Famoso Hernández"; Level: International Series; Prize: $5,000; Format: 32MS/32WS/32MD/16WD/32XD	Score: 21–14, 21–12	
13 December	El Salvador International: Host: San Salvador, El Salvador; Venue: Palacio Nacional de los Deportes "Carlos el Famoso Hernández"; Level: International Series; Prize: $5,000; Format: 32MS/32WS/32MD/16WD/32XD	(United States) Ishika Jaiswal	(Brazil) Juliana Viana Vieira
13 December	El Salvador International: Host: San Salvador, El Salvador; Venue: Palacio Nacional de los Deportes "Carlos el Famoso Hernández"; Level: International Series; Prize: $5,000; Format: 32MS/32WS/32MD/16WD/32XD	Score: 21–19, 21–17	
13 December	El Salvador International: Host: San Salvador, El Salvador; Venue: Palacio Nacional de los Deportes "Carlos el Famoso Hernández"; Level: International Series; Prize: $5,000; Format: 32MS/32WS/32MD/16WD/32XD	(Brazil) Jonathan Matias (Brazil) Artur Silva Pomoceno	(Italy) Fabio Caponio (Italy) Giovanni Toti
13 December	El Salvador International: Host: San Salvador, El Salvador; Venue: Palacio Nacional de los Deportes "Carlos el Famoso Hernández"; Level: International Series; Prize: $5,000; Format: 32MS/32WS/32MD/16WD/32XD	Score: 21–11, 14–21, 21–17	
13 December	El Salvador International: Host: San Salvador, El Salvador; Venue: Palacio Nacional de los Deportes "Carlos el Famoso Hernández"; Level: International Series; Prize: $5,000; Format: 32MS/32WS/32MD/16WD/32XD	(Brazil) Sânia Lima (Brazil) Tamires Santos	(Italy) Katharina Fink (Italy) Yasmine Hamza
13 December	El Salvador International: Host: San Salvador, El Salvador; Venue: Palacio Nacional de los Deportes "Carlos el Famoso Hernández"; Level: International Series; Prize: $5,000; Format: 32MS/32WS/32MD/16WD/32XD	Score: 21–12, 13–21, 21–13	
13 December	El Salvador International: Host: San Salvador, El Salvador; Venue: Palacio Nacional de los Deportes "Carlos el Famoso Hernández"; Level: International Series; Prize: $5,000; Format: 32MS/32WS/32MD/16WD/32XD	(Guatemala) Christopher Martinez (Guatemala) Mariana Paiz	(United States) Kevin Shi (United States) Ishika Jaiswal
13 December	El Salvador International: Host: San Salvador, El Salvador; Venue: Palacio Nacional de los Deportes "Carlos el Famoso Hernández"; Level: International Series; Prize: $5,000; Format: 32MS/32WS/32MD/16WD/32XD	Score: 21–14, 21–18	

== BWF Player of the Year Awards ==
The followings are the nominees and the winners of the 2020/2021 BWF Player of the Year Awards.

Player of the Year
Male Player of the Year	Female player of the Year
(Denmark) Viktor Axelsen (Men's singles); (Denmark) Anders Antonsen (Men's singles); (China) Wang Yilyu (Mixed doubles); (Japan) Yuta Watanabe (Men's & mixed doubles)	(Chinese Taipei) Tai Tzu-ying (Women's singles); (China) Chen Yufei (Women's singles); (Spain) Carolina Marín (Women's singles); (Japan) Akane Yamaguchi (Women's singles)
Pair of the Year
(Indonesia) Greysia Polii / Apriyani Rahayu (Women's doubles); (South Korea) Kim So-yeong / Kong Hee-yong (Women's doubles); (Chinese Taipei) Lee Yang / Wang Chi-lin (Men's doubles); (China) Wang Yilyu / Huang Dongping (Mixed doubles); (Japan) Yuta Watanabe / Arisa Higashino (Mixed doubles)
Most Improved Player of the Year
(Chinese Taipei) Lee Yang / Wang Chi-lin (Men's doubles); (Malaysia) Aaron Chia / Soh Wooi Yik (Men's doubles); (Thailand) Pornpawee Chochuwong (Women's singles); (Malaysia) Lee Zii Jia (Men's singles)
Eddy Choong Most Promising Player of the Year
(Thailand) Kunlavut Vitidsarn (Men's singles); (Denmark) Line Christophersen (Women's singles); (France) Toma Junior Popov (Men's singles & doubles); (Canada) Brian Yang (Men's singles)
Para-badminton Player of the Year
Male Para-badminton Player of the Year	Female Para-badminton Player of the Year
(China) Qu Zimo (Men's singles WH1 & doubles WH1–WH2); (India) Pramod Bhagat (Men's singles SL3 & mixed doubles SL3–SU5); (Malaysia) Cheah Liek Hou (Men's singles SU5); (Japan) Daiki Kajiwara (Men's singles WH2 & doubles WH1–WH2); (South Korea) Kim Jung-jun (Men's singles WH2 & doubles WH1–WH2); (France) Lucas Mazur (Men's singles SL4 & Mixed doubles SL3–SU5)	(Indonesia) Leani Ratri Oktila (Women's singles SL4, doubles SL3–SU5 & mixed doubles SL3–SU5); (China) Cheng Hefang (Women's singles SL4 & doubles SL3–SU5); (China) Liu Yutong (Women's singles WH2 & doubles WH1–WH2); (France) Faustine Noël (Women's singles SL4, doubles SL3–SU5 & mixed doubles SL3–SU5); (Thailand) Sujirat Pookkham (Women's singles WH1 & doubles WH1–WH2); (Japan) Sarina Satomi (Women's singles WH2 & doubles WH1–WH2)
Para-badminton Pair of the Year
(France) Lucas Mazur / Faustine Noël (Mixed doubles SL3–SU5); (India) Pramod Bhagat / Manoj Sarkar (Men's doubles SL3–SL4); (South Korea) Lee Dong-seop / Kim Jung-jun (Men's doubles WH1–WH2); (China) Qu Zimo / Mai Jianpeng (Men's doubles WH1–WH2); (Japan) Sarina Satomi / Yuma Yamazaki (Women's doubles WH1–WH2); (Indonesia) Hary Susanto / Leani Ratri Oktila (Mixed doubles SL3–SU5)

== Retirements ==
Following is a list of notable players (winners of the main tour title, and/or part of the BWF Rankings top 100 for at least one week) who announced their retirement from professional badminton, during the 2021 season:

- Shiho Tanaka (born 5 September 1992 in Kumamoto Prefecture, Japan) reached a career-high of no. 4 in the women's doubles on 14 June 2018. She was the bronze medalist at the 2018 World Championships in the women's doubles, and at the 2015 Summer Universiade in the women's singles. She won the year-end tournament Superseries Finals in 2017. Tanaka was part of the Japanese winning team at the 2017 Asia Mixed Team Championships, 2018 Uber Cup, and at the 2018 Asia Women's Team Championships. She announced her retirement from the badminton tournament at the press conference in the Akita Prefectural office on 29 January 2021. The 2019 BWF World Championships was her last tournament.
- Koharu Yonemoto (born 7 December 1990 in Hiroshima, Japan) reached a career-high of no. 4 in the women's doubles on 14 June 2018. She was the women's doubles bronze medalist at the 2018 World Championships, and the silver medalist at the 2013 East Asian Games. She won the year-end tournament Superseries Finals in 2017. Yonemoto was part of the Japanese winning team at the 2017 Asia Mixed Team Championships, 2018 Uber Cup, 2018 Asian Games, and at the 2018 Asia Women's Team Championships. She announced her retirement from the badminton tournament at the press conference in the Akita Prefectural office on 29 January 2021. The 2019 BWF World Championships was her last tournament.
- Chris Adcock (born 27 April 1989 in Leicester, England) reached a career-high of no. 4 in the mixed doubles and no. 9 in the men's doubles. He was two times mixed doubles European and Commonwealth Games champion. During his career in badminton, Chris Adcock has won two titles at the European Junior Championships in the boys' doubles and the mixed team event; silver at the World Junior Championships; a silver and a bronze at the World Championships; a silver at the European Games; two golds, a silver and 2 bronzes at the Commonwealth Games; and two golds and 3 bronzes at the European Championships. He was the first English player that won the year-end tournament in the 2015 Dubai World Superseries Finals (partnered with Gabby Adcock). Badminton England reported his retirement on 27 May 2021. The 2020 Denmark Open was his last tournament.
- Gabby Adcock (born 30 September 1990 in Leeds, England) reached a career-high of no. 4 in the mixed doubles and no. 16 in the women's doubles. She was two times mixed doubles European and Commonwealth Games champion. During her career in badminton, Gabby Adcock has won a gold and a bronze at the European Junior Championships; a silver at the World Junior Championships; a bronze at the World Championships; a silver at the European Games; two golds, a silver and 3 bronzes at the Commonwealth Games; and two golds at the European Championships. She was the first English player that won the year-end tournament in the 2015 Dubai World Superseries Finals (partnered with Chris Adcock). Badminton England reported her retirement on 27 May 2021. The 2020 Denmark Open was her last tournament.
- Sabrina Jaquet (born 21 June 1987 in La Chaux-de-Fonds, Switzerland) reached a career-high of no. 30 in the women's singles on 14 September 2017. She was the bronze medalist at the 2017 European Championships. She announced her retirement after her last match at the 2020 Summer Olympics on 28 July 2021. The 2020 Summer Olympics was her last tournament.
- Chow Mei Kuan (born 23 December 1994 in Cheras, Kuala Lumpur, Malaysia) reached a career-high of no. 10 in the women's doubles on 2 February 2021. She was the gold medalist at the 2018 Commonwealth Games in women's doubles and silver in the mixed team; gold at the World Junior Championships in mixed team and two bronze at the women's and mixed doubles; and bronze at the 2019 Southeast Asian Games and 2013 Summer Universiade in women's doubles. She helped the Malaysian team win a silver at the 2018 Commonwealth Games Mixed Team and bronze at the 2020 Asian Women's Team Championships. The Badminton Association of Malaysia announced her retirement on 16 August 2021. The 2020 Summer Olympics was her last tournament.
- Han Chengkai (born 29 January 1998 in Fuzhou, Fujian, China) reached a career-high of no. 5 in the men's doubles on 9 April 2019. He won the boys' doubles title at the 2016 Asian and World Junior Championships, and also 2 World Tour titles. Han also part of the Chinese team that won the 2019 Tong Yun Kai and Sudirman Cups. He announced his retirement at the age of 23 after competing at the 2021 National Games of China on 13 September 2021. The 2020 All England Open was his last tournament.
- Gergely Krausz (born 25 December 1993 in Mór, Hungary) reached a career-high of no. 81 in the men's singles on 10 May 2018. He won 2 International Series titles. He is the first ever Hungarian men's singles player to participate at the Olympics by competing at the 2020 Tokyo Games. He retired from the international badminton on 17 October 2021. The 2020 Summer Olympics was his last tournament.
- Mads Pieler Kolding (born 27 January 1988 in Holbæk, Denmark) reached a career-high of no. 4 in the men's doubles on 14 May 2018. He won the men's doubles gold medal at the 2016 European Championships, 6 Grand Prix titles and 14 International Challenge/Series titles. He was part of the Danish winning team at the 2014, 2016 and 2018 European Men's Team Championships, 2015, 2017, 2019, 2021 European Mixed Team Championships, and also at the 2016 Thomas Cup. He retired from the international badminton on 4 November 2021. The 2020 Thomas Cup was his last tournament.
- Li Junhui (born 10 May 1995 in Anshan, Liaoning, China) reached a career-high of no. 1 in the men's doubles on 6 April 2017. He won the men's doubles gold medal at the 2018 World Championships and silver at the 2020 Summer Olympics with Liu Yuchen. Li was also part of the Chinese team that won the Sudirman Cup in 2019, the Thomas Cup in 2018, and also the Asian Games in 2018. He announced his retirement through social media on 12 November 2021. The 2020 Summer Olympics was his last tournament.
