= 2014 BWF season =

2014 BWF Season
Details
- Duration: January 7, 2014 – December 28, 2014

Achievements (singles)

Awards
- Player of the year: (China) Chen Long (Male) (China) Zhao Yunlei (Female)

The 2014 BWF Season was the overall badminton circuit organized by the Badminton World Federation (BWF) for the 2014 badminton season to publish and promote the sport. Besides the BWF World Championships, BWF promotes the sport of badminton through an extensive worldwide programme of events in four structure levels. They are the individual tournaments called Super Series, Grand Prix Events, International Challenge and International Series. Besides the individual tournaments, team events such as Thomas Cup & Uber Cup and Sudirman Cup are held every other year.

The 2014 BWF season calendar comprises the World Championships tournaments, the Sudirman Cup, the BWF Super Series (Super Series, Super Series Premier, Super Series Finals), the Grand Prix (Grand Prix Gold and Grand Prix), the International Series (International Series and International Challenge), and BWF Future Series.

== Schedule ==
This is the complete schedule of events on the 2014 calendar, with the Champions and Runners-up documented.

Key

World Championships
Super Series Finals
Super Series Premier
Super Series
Grand Prix Gold
Grand Prix
International Challenge
International Series
Future Series
Team events

=== January ===
| Week of | Tournament | Champions | Runners-up |
|---|---|---|---|
| January 6 | Korea Open; Seoul, South Korea; Super Series $600,000 – 32MS/32WS/32MD/32WD/32XD; Draw | (China) Chen Long; 21–14, 21–15 | (Malaysia) Lee Chong Wei |
| January 6 | Korea Open; Seoul, South Korea; Super Series $600,000 – 32MS/32WS/32MD/32WD/32XD; Draw | (China) Wang Yihan; 21–13, 21–19 | (Thailand) Ratchanok Intanon |
| January 6 | Korea Open; Seoul, South Korea; Super Series $600,000 – 32MS/32WS/32MD/32WD/32XD; Draw | (Denmark) Mathias Boe (Denmark) Carsten Mogensen; 21–12, 21–17 | (China) Fu Haifeng (China) Hong Wei |
| January 6 | Korea Open; Seoul, South Korea; Super Series $600,000 – 32MS/32WS/32MD/32WD/32XD; Draw | (China) Bao Yixin (China) Tang Jinhua; 21–17, 21–15 | (China) Luo Ying (China) Luo Yu |
| January 6 | Korea Open; Seoul, South Korea; Super Series $600,000 – 32MS/32WS/32MD/32WD/32XD; Draw | (China) Zhang Nan (China) Zhao Yunlei; 21–18, 21–18 | (China) Xu Chen (China) Ma Jin |
| January 6 | Estonian International; Tallinn, Estonia; International Series $5,000 – 32MS/32WS/32MD/32WD/32XD | (Denmark) Rasmus Fladberg; 21–14, 21–14 | (Ukraine) Valeriy Atrashchenkov |
| January 6 | Estonian International; Tallinn, Estonia; International Series $5,000 – 32MS/32WS/32MD/32WD/32XD | (Russia) Evgeniya Kosetskaya; 21–16, 23–21 | (Ukraine) Marija Ulitina |
| January 6 | Estonian International; Tallinn, Estonia; International Series $5,000 – 32MS/32WS/32MD/32WD/32XD | (Russia) Nikita Khakimov (Russia) Vasily Kuznetsov; 14–21, 21–13, 21–19 | (France) Laurent Constantin (France) Matthieu Lo Ying Ping |
| January 6 | Estonian International; Tallinn, Estonia; International Series $5,000 – 32MS/32WS/32MD/32WD/32XD | (Russia) Anastasia Chervyakova (Russia) Nina Vislova; 21–9, 21–12 | (Netherlands) Myke Halkema (Netherlands) Gayle Mahulette |
| January 6 | Estonian International; Tallinn, Estonia; International Series $5,000 – 32MS/32WS/32MD/32WD/32XD | (Russia) Vitalij Durkin (Russia) Nina Vislova; 24–22, 14–21, 21–16 | (Russia) Anatoliy Yartsev (Russia) Evgeniya Kosetskaya |
| January 13 | Malaysia Open; Kuala Lumpur, Malaysia; Super Series Premier $500,000 – 32MS/32WS/32MD/32WD/32XD; Draw | (Malaysia) Lee Chong Wei; 21–19, 21–9 | (Indonesia) Tommy Sugiarto |
| January 13 | Malaysia Open; Kuala Lumpur, Malaysia; Super Series Premier $500,000 – 32MS/32WS/32MD/32WD/32XD; Draw | (China) Li Xuerui; 21–16, 21–17 | (China) Wang Shixian |
| January 13 | Malaysia Open; Kuala Lumpur, Malaysia; Super Series Premier $500,000 – 32MS/32WS/32MD/32WD/32XD; Draw | (Malaysia) Goh V Shem (Malaysia) Lim Khim Wah; 21–19, 21–18 | (China) Chai Biao (China) Hong Wei |
| January 13 | Malaysia Open; Kuala Lumpur, Malaysia; Super Series Premier $500,000 – 32MS/32WS/32MD/32WD/32XD; Draw | (China) Bao Yixin (China) Tang Jinhua; 21–19, 14–21, 21–13 | (Japan) Misaki Matsutomo (Japan) Ayaka Takahashi |
| January 13 | Malaysia Open; Kuala Lumpur, Malaysia; Super Series Premier $500,000 – 32MS/32WS/32MD/32WD/32XD; Draw | (China) Xu Chen (China) Ma Jin; 21–11, 17–21, 21–13 | (Denmark) Joachim Fischer Nielsen (Denmark) Christinna Pedersen |
| January 13 | Swedish Masters; Uppsala, Sweden; International Challenge $15,000 – 32MS/32WS/32MD/32WD/32XD | (Finland) Ville Lang; 16–21, 21–14, 21–19 | (Sweden) Henri Hurskainen |
| January 13 | Swedish Masters; Uppsala, Sweden; International Challenge $15,000 – 32MS/32WS/32MD/32WD/32XD | (Scotland) Kirsty Gilmour; 24–22, 12–21, 21–10 | (Denmark) Line Kjaersfeldt |
| January 13 | Swedish Masters; Uppsala, Sweden; International Challenge $15,000 – 32MS/32WS/32MD/32WD/32XD | (Poland) Adam Cwalina (Poland) Przemyslaw Wacha; 21–18, 20–22, 21–15 | (Poland) Lukasz Moren (Poland) Wojciech Szkudlarczyk |
| January 13 | Swedish Masters; Uppsala, Sweden; International Challenge $15,000 – 32MS/32WS/32MD/32WD/32XD | (Netherlands) Eefje Muskens (Netherlands) Selena Piek; 21–19, 21–11 | (Denmark) Line Damkjaer Kruse (Denmark) Marie Roepke |
| January 13 | Swedish Masters; Uppsala, Sweden; International Challenge $15,000 – 32MS/32WS/32MD/32WD/32XD | (Scotland) Robert Blair (Scotland) Imogen Bankier; 24–22, 14–21, 21–16 | (Germany) Peter Kaesbauer (Germany) Isabel Herttrich |
| January 20 | India Grand Prix Gold; Lucknow, India; Grand Prix Gold $120,000 – 64MS/32WS/32MD/32WD/32XD; Draw | (China) Xue Song; 16–21, 21–19, 21–13 | (India) Srikanth Kidambi |
| January 20 | India Grand Prix Gold; Lucknow, India; Grand Prix Gold $120,000 – 64MS/32WS/32MD/32WD/32XD; Draw | (India) Saina Nehwal; 21–14, 21–17 | (India) Pusarla Venkata Sindhu |
| January 20 | India Grand Prix Gold; Lucknow, India; Grand Prix Gold $120,000 – 64MS/32WS/32MD/32WD/32XD; Draw | (China) Li Junhui (China) Liu Yuchen; 21–17, 19–21, 22–20 | (China) Huang Kaixiang (China) Zheng Siwei |
| January 20 | India Grand Prix Gold; Lucknow, India; Grand Prix Gold $120,000 – 64MS/32WS/32MD/32WD/32XD; Draw | (China) Chen Qingchen (China) Jia Yifan; 22–24, 21–19, 21–11 | (China) Huang Yaqiong (China) Yu Xiaohan |
| January 20 | India Grand Prix Gold; Lucknow, India; Grand Prix Gold $120,000 – 64MS/32WS/32MD/32WD/32XD; Draw | (China) Wang Yilu (China) Huang Yaqiong; 21–18, 21–14 | (China) Huang Kaixiang (China) Chen Qingchen |
| January 20 | Iceland International; Reykjavík, Iceland; International Series $5,000 – 32MS/32WS/32MD/16WD/32XD | (Malaysia) Beryno Jiann Tze Wong; 21–19, 21–13 | (Denmark) Kian Andersen |
| January 20 | Iceland International; Reykjavík, Iceland; International Series $5,000 – 32MS/32WS/32MD/16WD/32XD | (Finland) Airi Mikkela; 21–14, 18–21, 21–11 | (Lithuania) Akvile Stapusaityte |
| January 20 | Iceland International; Reykjavík, Iceland; International Series $5,000 – 32MS/32WS/32MD/16WD/32XD | (Scotland) Martin Campbell (Scotland) Patrick MacHugh; 21–15, 12–21, 21–14 | (Belgium) Mattijs Dierickx (Belgium) Freek Golinski |
| January 20 | Iceland International; Reykjavík, Iceland; International Series $5,000 – 32MS/32WS/32MD/16WD/32XD | (Wales) Sarah Thomas (Wales) Carissa Turner; 21–11, 21–8 | (Iceland) Sara Hognadottir (Iceland) Margrét Johannsdottir |
| January 20 | Iceland International; Reykjavík, Iceland; International Series $5,000 – 32MS/32WS/32MD/16WD/32XD | (Denmark) Alexander Bond (Denmark) Ditte Soby Hansen; 21–9, 21–13 | (Denmark) Nicklas Mathiasen (Denmark) Cecilie Bjergen |

=== February ===
| Week of | Tournament | Champions | Runners-up |
|---|---|---|---|
| February 10 | Oceania Badminton Championships; Ballarat, Australia; Continental Championships; 64MS/64WS/32MD/32WD/64XD; Draw | (Australia) Jeff Tho; 21–13, 21–15 | (Australia) Ashwant Gobinathan |
| February 10 | Oceania Badminton Championships; Ballarat, Australia; Continental Championships; 64MS/64WS/32MD/32WD/64XD; Draw | (Australia) Verdet Kessler; 21–23, 21–14, 21–14 | (New Zealand) Michelle Chan |
| February 10 | Oceania Badminton Championships; Ballarat, Australia; Continental Championships; 64MS/64WS/32MD/32WD/64XD; Draw | (Australia) Raymond Tam (Australia) Glenn Warfe; 21–11, 21–13 | (Australia) Matthew Chau (Australia) Sawan Serasinghe |
| February 10 | Oceania Badminton Championships; Ballarat, Australia; Continental Championships; 64MS/64WS/32MD/32WD/64XD; Draw | (Australia) Jacqueline Guan (Australia) Gronya Somerville; 21–14, 21–17 | (Australia) Jacinta Joe (Australia) Louisa Ma |
| February 10 | Oceania Badminton Championships; Ballarat, Australia; Continental Championships; 64MS/64WS/32MD/32WD/64XD; Draw | (New Zealand) Oliver Leydon-Davis (New Zealand) Susannah Leydon-Davis; 21–19, 21–13 | (Australia) Matthew Chau (Australia) Jacqueline Guan |
| February 10 | China International; Lingshui, China; International Challenge $50,000 – 32MS/32WS/32MD/32WD/32XD | (Hong Kong) Ng Ka Long; 21–16, 21–15 | (Hong Kong) Wei Nan |
| February 10 | China International; Lingshui, China; International Challenge $50,000 – 32MS/32WS/32MD/32WD/32XD | (China) Liu Xin; 21–15, 21–17 | (China) Hui Xirui |
| February 10 | China International; Lingshui, China; International Challenge $50,000 – 32MS/32WS/32MD/32WD/32XD | (China) Wang Yilyu (China) Zhang Wen; 21–14, 21–12 | (Chinese Taipei) Liao Chi-hung (Chinese Taipei) Liao I-liang |
| February 10 | China International; Lingshui, China; International Challenge $50,000 – 32MS/32WS/32MD/32WD/32XD | (China) Luo Ying (China) Luo Yu; 21–13, 21–12 | (China) Ou Dongni (China) Xiong Mengjing |
| February 10 | China International; Lingshui, China; International Challenge $50,000 – 32MS/32WS/32MD/32WD/32XD | (China) Wang Yilyu (China) Ou Dongni; 21–18, 15–21, 21–19 | (China) Zhang Wen (China) Xia Huan |
| February 10 | European Men's and Women's Team Badminton Championships; Basel, Switzerland; CC Team Championships; 26 teams (M)/22 teams (W); Draw | Denmark; 3–1 | England |
| February 10 | European Men's and Women's Team Badminton Championships; Basel, Switzerland; CC Team Championships; 26 teams (M)/22 teams (W); Draw | Denmark; 3–0 | Russia |
| February 10 | Iran Fajr International; Tehran, Iran; International Challenge $15,000 – 64MS/32WS/32MD/32WD | (India) Sourabh Varma; 21–13, 21–11 | (Indonesia) Alrie Guna Dharma |
| February 10 | Iran Fajr International; Tehran, Iran; International Challenge $15,000 – 64MS/32WS/32MD/32WD | (Malaysia) Tee Jing Yi; 21–10, 21–15 | (Malaysia) Yang Li Lian |
| February 10 | Iran Fajr International; Tehran, Iran; International Challenge $15,000 – 64MS/32WS/32MD/32WD | (Chinese Taipei) Chen Hung-ling (Chinese Taipei) Lu Chia-pin; 21–17, 21–18 | (Chinese Taipei) Liang Jui-wei (Chinese Taipei) Liao Kuan-hao |
| February 10 | Iran Fajr International; Tehran, Iran; International Challenge $15,000 – 64MS/32WS/32MD/32WD | (Malaysia) Amelia Alicia Anscelly (Malaysia) Soong Fie Cho; 21–11, 21–19 | (Turkey) Özge Bayrak (Turkey) Neslihan Yiğit |
| February 17 | Austrian International; Vienna, Austria; International Challenge $15,000 – 32MS/32WS/32MD/32WD/32XD | (India) Sourabh Varma; 21–11, 21–23, 21–18 | (Indonesia) Andre Kurniawan Tedjono |
| February 17 | Austrian International; Vienna, Austria; International Challenge $15,000 – 32MS/32WS/32MD/32WD/32XD | (Chinese Taipei) Pai Hsiao-ma; 21–18, 21–11 | (Chinese Taipei) Cheng Chi-ya |
| February 17 | Austrian International; Vienna, Austria; International Challenge $15,000 – 32MS/32WS/32MD/32WD/32XD | (Chinese Taipei) Chen Hung-ling (Chinese Taipei) Lu Chia-pin; 16–21, 21–12, 21–13 | (Chinese Taipei) Liang Jui-wei (Chinese Taipei) Liao Kuan-hao |
| February 17 | Austrian International; Vienna, Austria; International Challenge $15,000 – 32MS/32WS/32MD/32WD/32XD | (Bulgaria) Gabriela Stoeva (Bulgaria) Stefani Stoeva; 21–17, 20–22, 21–15 | (Russia) Olga Golovanova (Russia) Viktoriia Vorobeva |
| February 17 | Austrian International; Vienna, Austria; International Challenge $15,000 – 32MS/32WS/32MD/32WD/32XD | (Poland) Robert Mateusiak (Poland) Agnieszka Wojtkowska; 21–15, 15–21, 21–16 | (Malaysia) Chan Peng Soon (Malaysia) Lai Pei Jing |
| February 17 | Uganda International; Lugogo, Uganda; International Series $5,000 – 32MS/32WS/32MD/16WD/32XD | (Sri Lanka) Dinuka Karunaratne; 21–12, 21–15 | (South Africa) Jacob Maliekal |
| February 17 | Uganda International; Lugogo, Uganda; International Series $5,000 – 32MS/32WS/32MD/16WD/32XD | (India) Trupti Murgunde; 22–20, 21–14 | (Sri Lanka) Lekha Shehani |
| February 17 | Uganda International; Lugogo, Uganda; International Series $5,000 – 32MS/32WS/32MD/16WD/32XD | (Malaysia) Chong Chun Quan (Malaysia) Yeoh Seng Zoe; 21–14, 11–21, 21–14 | (South Africa) Andries Malan (South Africa) Willem Viljoen |
| February 17 | Uganda International; Lugogo, Uganda; International Series $5,000 – 32MS/32WS/32MD/16WD/32XD | (Nigeria) Tosin Damilola Atolagbe (Nigeria) Fatima Azeez; 14–21, 21–9, 21–12 | (Nigeria) Dorcas Ajoke Adesokan (Nigeria) Augustina Ebhomien Sunday |
| February 17 | Uganda International; Lugogo, Uganda; International Series $5,000 – 32MS/32WS/32MD/16WD/32XD | (Nigeria) Ola Fagbemi (Nigeria) Dorcas Ajoke Adesokan; 15–21, 21–10, 21–18 | (Nigeria) Enejoh Abah (Nigeria) Tosin Damilola Atolagbe |
| February 24 | German Open; Mülheim, Germany; Grand Prix Gold $120,000 – 64MS/32WS/32MD/32WD/32XD; Draw | (India) Arvind Bhat; 24–22, 19–21, 21–11 | (Denmark) Hans-Kristian Vittinghus |
| February 24 | German Open; Mülheim, Germany; Grand Prix Gold $120,000 – 64MS/32WS/32MD/32WD/32XD; Draw | (Japan) Sayaka Takahashi; 21–17, 8–21, 21–12 | (South Korea) Sung Ji-hyun |
| February 24 | German Open; Mülheim, Germany; Grand Prix Gold $120,000 – 64MS/32WS/32MD/32WD/32XD; Draw | (Japan) Takeshi Kamura (Japan) Keigo Sonoda; 21–19, 14–21, 21–14 | (Japan) Hiroyuki Endo (Japan) Kenichi Hayakawa |
| February 24 | German Open; Mülheim, Germany; Grand Prix Gold $120,000 – 64MS/32WS/32MD/32WD/32XD; Draw | (Japan) Misaki Matsutomo (Japan) Ayaka Takahashi; 23–21, 24–22 | (South Korea) Jung Kyung-eun (South Korea) Kim Ha-na |
| February 24 | German Open; Mülheim, Germany; Grand Prix Gold $120,000 – 64MS/32WS/32MD/32WD/32XD; Draw | (Scotland) Robert Blair (Scotland) Imogen Bankier; 21–15, 21–18 | (South Korea) Ko Sung-hyun (South Korea) Kim Ha-na |

=== March ===
| Week of | Tournament | Champions | Runners-up |
|---|---|---|---|
| March 3 | All England Open; Birmingham, England; Super Series Premier $400,000 – 32MS/32WS/32MD/32WD/32XD; Draw | (Malaysia) Lee Chong Wei; 21–13, 21–18 | (China) Chen Long |
| March 3 | All England Open; Birmingham, England; Super Series Premier $400,000 – 32MS/32WS/32MD/32WD/32XD; Draw | (China) Wang Shixian; 21–19, 21–18 | (China) Li Xuerui |
| March 3 | All England Open; Birmingham, England; Super Series Premier $400,000 – 32MS/32WS/32MD/32WD/32XD; Draw | (Indonesia) Mohammad Ahsan (Indonesia) Hendra Setiawan; 21–19, 21–19 | (Japan) Hiroyuki Endo (Japan) Kenichi Hayakawa |
| March 3 | All England Open; Birmingham, England; Super Series Premier $400,000 – 32MS/32WS/32MD/32WD/32XD; Draw | (China) Wang Xiaoli (China) Yu Yang; 21–17, 18–21, 23–21 | (China) Ma Jin (China) Tang Yuanting |
| March 3 | All England Open; Birmingham, England; Super Series Premier $400,000 – 32MS/32WS/32MD/32WD/32XD; Draw | (Indonesia) Tontowi Ahmad (Indonesia) Lilyana Natsir; 21–13, 21–17 | (China) Zhang Nan (China) Zhao Yunlei |
| March 3 | Portugal International; Caldas da Rainha, Portugal; International Series $5,000 – 32MS/32WS/32MD/32WD/32XD | (Japan) Rei Sato; 23–21, 21–7 | (Malaysia) Beryno Jiann Tze Wong |
| March 3 | Portugal International; Caldas da Rainha, Portugal; International Series $5,000 – 32MS/32WS/32MD/32WD/32XD | (Denmark) Sandra-Maria Jensen; 17–21, 23–21, 21–12 | (Denmark) Anna Thea Madsen |
| March 3 | Portugal International; Caldas da Rainha, Portugal; International Series $5,000 – 32MS/32WS/32MD/32WD/32XD | (Japan) Kazuki Matsumaru (Japan) Izumi Okoshi; 18–21, 21–13, 21–17 | (Scotland) Martin Campbell (Scotland) Patrick MacHugh |
| March 3 | Portugal International; Caldas da Rainha, Portugal; International Series $5,000 – 32MS/32WS/32MD/32WD/32XD | (Wales) Sarah Thomas (Wales) Carissa Turner; 21–17, 21–15 | (Scotland) Rebekka Findlay (Scotland) Caitlin Pringle |
| March 3 | Portugal International; Caldas da Rainha, Portugal; International Series $5,000 – 32MS/32WS/32MD/32WD/32XD | (Austria) Roman Zirnwald (Austria) Elisabeth Baldauf; 21–19, 21–11 | (Denmark) Jeppe Ludvigsen (Denmark) Mai Surrow |
| March 10 | Swiss Open; Basel, Switzerland; Grand Prix Gold $120,000 – 64MS/32WS/32MD/32WD/32XD; Draw | (Denmark) Viktor Axelsen; 21–7, 16–21, 25–23 | (China) Tian Houwei |
| March 10 | Swiss Open; Basel, Switzerland; Grand Prix Gold $120,000 – 64MS/32WS/32MD/32WD/32XD; Draw | (China) Wang Yihan; 21–23, 21–9, 21–11 | (China) Sun Yu |
| March 10 | Swiss Open; Basel, Switzerland; Grand Prix Gold $120,000 – 64MS/32WS/32MD/32WD/32XD; Draw | (China) Chai Biao (China) Hong Wei; 22–20, 21–14 | (China) Fu Haifeng (China) Zhang Nan |
| March 10 | Swiss Open; Basel, Switzerland; Grand Prix Gold $120,000 – 64MS/32WS/32MD/32WD/32XD; Draw | (China) Bao Yixin (China) Tang Jinhua; 19–21, 21–16, 21–13 | (Indonesia) Nitya Krishinda Maheswari (Indonesia) Greysia Polii |
| March 10 | Swiss Open; Basel, Switzerland; Grand Prix Gold $120,000 – 64MS/32WS/32MD/32WD/32XD; Draw | (England) Chris Adcock (England) Gabby Adcock; 21–17, 21–13 | (China) Chai Biao (China) Tang Jinhua |
| March 10 | Romanian International; Timișoara, Romania; International Series $5,000 – 32MS/32WS/32MD/16WD/32XD | (Malaysia) Misbun Ramdan Misbun; 15–21, 21–18, 21–16 | (Poland) Adrian Dziółko |
| March 10 | Romanian International; Timișoara, Romania; International Series $5,000 – 32MS/32WS/32MD/16WD/32XD | (France) Delphine Lansac; 22–20, 21–14 | (Hungary) Laura Sárosi |
| March 10 | Romanian International; Timișoara, Romania; International Series $5,000 – 32MS/32WS/32MD/16WD/32XD | (Croatia) Zvonimir Đurkinjak (Croatia) Zvonimir Hölbling; 21–12, 21–13 | (France) Bastian Kersaudy (France) Gaëtan Mittelheisser |
| March 10 | Romanian International; Timișoara, Romania; International Series $5,000 – 32MS/32WS/32MD/16WD/32XD | (Germany) Barbara Bellenberg (Germany) Ramona Hacks; 21–15, 21–13 | (Germany) Kira Kattenback (Germany) Franziska Volkmann |
| March 10 | Romanian International; Timișoara, Romania; International Series $5,000 – 32MS/32WS/32MD/16WD/32XD | (Scotland) Martin Campbell (Scotland) Jillie Cooper; 21–14, 21–15 | (France) Bastian Kersaudy (France) Teshana Vignes Waran |
| March 17 | Polish Open; Warsaw, Poland; International Challenge $15,000 – 32MS/32WS/32MD/32WD/32XD | (France) Brice Leverdez; 21–6, 21–16 | (Denmark) Rasmus Fladberg |
| March 17 | Polish Open; Warsaw, Poland; International Challenge $15,000 – 32MS/32WS/32MD/32WD/32XD | (Japan) Yuka Kusunose; 21–13, 21–18 | (Japan) Chisato Hoshi |
| March 17 | Polish Open; Warsaw, Poland; International Challenge $15,000 – 32MS/32WS/32MD/32WD/32XD | (Poland) Adam Cwalina (Poland) Przemysław Wacha; 21–10, 21–11 | (Russia) Nikita Khakimov (Russia) Vasily Kuznetsov |
| March 17 | Polish Open; Warsaw, Poland; International Challenge $15,000 – 32MS/32WS/32MD/32WD/32XD | (Russia) Anastasia Chervaykova (Russia) Nina Vislova; 15–21, 21–17, 22–20 | (Japan) Ayane Kurihara (Japan) Naru Shinoya |
| March 17 | Polish Open; Warsaw, Poland; International Challenge $15,000 – 32MS/32WS/32MD/32WD/32XD | (Russia) Vitalij Durkin (Russia) Nina Vislova; 21–15, 16–7 Retired | (Poland) Robert Mateusiak (Poland) Agnieszka Wojtkowska |
| March 23 | Vietnam International; Hanoi, Vietnam; International Challenge $15,000 – 64MS/32WS/32MD/32WD/32XD | (Vietnam) Nguyễn Tiến Minh; 21–17, 21–13 | (Malaysia) Tan Chun Seang |
| March 23 | Vietnam International; Hanoi, Vietnam; International Challenge $15,000 – 64MS/32WS/32MD/32WD/32XD | (Chinese Taipei) Hung Shih-han; 21–18, 21–15 | (China) Jiang Yujing |
| March 23 | Vietnam International; Hanoi, Vietnam; International Challenge $15,000 – 64MS/32WS/32MD/32WD/32XD | (Indonesia) Selvanus Geh (Indonesia) Kevin Sanjaya Sukamuljo; 21–14, 21–13 | (Australia) Robin Middleton (Australia) Ross Smith |
| March 23 | Vietnam International; Hanoi, Vietnam; International Challenge $15,000 – 64MS/32WS/32MD/32WD/32XD | (Japan) Yano Chiemi (Japan) Yumiko Nishiyama; 21–12, 22–20 | (Indonesia) Melvira Oklamona (Indonesia) Melati Daeva Oktavianti |
| March 23 | Vietnam International; Hanoi, Vietnam; International Challenge $15,000 – 64MS/32WS/32MD/32WD/32XD | (Indonesia) Alfian Eko Prasetya (Indonesia) Annisa Saufika; 21–14, 21–17 | (Hong Kong) Fernando Kurniawan (Hong Kong) Poon Lok Yan |
| March 23 | Malaysia Masters; Pasir Gudang, Malaysia; Grand Prix Gold $120,000 – 64MS/32WS/32MD/32WD/32XD; Draw | (Indonesia) Simon Santoso; 15–21, 21–16, 21–19 | (India) Sourabh Varma |
| March 23 | Malaysia Masters; Pasir Gudang, Malaysia; Grand Prix Gold $120,000 – 64MS/32WS/32MD/32WD/32XD; Draw | (China) Yao Xue; 21–18, 21–18 | (Indonesia) Adriyanti Firdasari |
| March 23 | Malaysia Masters; Pasir Gudang, Malaysia; Grand Prix Gold $120,000 – 64MS/32WS/32MD/32WD/32XD; Draw | (Singapore) Danny Bawa Chrisnanta (Singapore) Chayut Triyachart; 21–17, 22–20 | (Malaysia) Goh V Shem (Malaysia) Lim Khim Wah |
| March 23 | Malaysia Masters; Pasir Gudang, Malaysia; Grand Prix Gold $120,000 – 64MS/32WS/32MD/32WD/32XD; Draw | (China) Huang Yaqiong (China) Yu Xiaohan; 22–20, 12–21, 21–18 | (China) Ou Dongni (China) Xiong Mengjing |
| March 23 | Malaysia Masters; Pasir Gudang, Malaysia; Grand Prix Gold $120,000 – 64MS/32WS/32MD/32WD/32XD; Draw | (China) Lu Kai (China) Huang Yaqiong; 21–14, 21–13 | (Indonesia) Praveen Jordan (Indonesia) Debby Susanto |
| March 23 | Giraldilla International; Havana, Cuba; International Series $5,000 – 32MS/32WS/32MD/16WD/32XD | (Czech Republic) Jan Fröhlich; 21–9, 21–6 | (United States) Bjorn Seguin |
| March 23 | Giraldilla International; Havana, Cuba; International Series $5,000 – 32MS/32WS/32MD/16WD/32XD | (Italy) Jeanine Cicognini; 21–19, 21–13 | (Belgium) Marie Demy |
| March 23 | Giraldilla International; Havana, Cuba; International Series $5,000 – 32MS/32WS/32MD/16WD/32XD | (Guatemala) Rodolfo Ramírez (Guatemala) Jonathan Solís; 21–15, 21–11 | (United States) Matthew Fogarty (United States) Bjorn Seguin |
| March 23 | Giraldilla International; Havana, Cuba; International Series $5,000 – 32MS/32WS/32MD/16WD/32XD | (Peru) Dánica Nishimura (Peru) Luz María Zornoza; 21–15, 21–17 | (Peru) Camilla García (Peru) Daniela Zapata |
| March 23 | Giraldilla International; Havana, Cuba; International Series $5,000 – 32MS/32WS/32MD/16WD/32XD | (Cuba) Osleni Guerrero (Cuba) Tahimara Oropeza; 21–16, 21–15 | (Peru) Andrés Corpancho (Peru) Luz María Zornoza |
| March 23 | Orleans International; Orléans, France; International Challenge $15,000 – 32MS/32WS/32MD/32WD/32XD | (Spain) Pablo Abián; 21–16, 19–21, 22–20 | (Russia) Vladimir Malkov |
| March 23 | Orleans International; Orléans, France; International Challenge $15,000 – 32MS/32WS/32MD/32WD/32XD | (Spain) Beatriz Corrales; 21–14, 21–13 | (France) Sashina Vignes Waran |
| March 23 | Orleans International; Orléans, France; International Challenge $15,000 – 32MS/32WS/32MD/32WD/32XD | (Poland) Adam Cwalina (Poland) Przemysław Wacha; 13–21, 21–17, 21–18 | (France) Bastian Kersaudy (France) Gaëtan Mittelheisser |
| March 23 | Orleans International; Orléans, France; International Challenge $15,000 – 32MS/32WS/32MD/32WD/32XD | (Scotland) Imogen Bankier (Bulgaria) Petya Nedelcheva; 21–14, 21–7 | (Bulgaria) Gabriela Stoeva (Bulgaria) Stefani Stoeva |
| March 23 | Orleans International; Orléans, France; International Challenge $15,000 – 32MS/32WS/32MD/32WD/32XD | (Scotland) Robert Blair (Scotland) Imogen Bankier; 21–13, 19–21, 21–18 | (Denmark) Niclas Nøhr (Denmark) Sara Thygesen |
| March 30 | India Open; New Delhi, India; Super Series $250,000 – 32MS/32WS/32MD/32WD/32XD; Draw | (Malaysia) Lee Chong Wei; 21–13, 21–17 | (China) Chen Long |
| March 30 | India Open; New Delhi, India; Super Series $250,000 – 32MS/32WS/32MD/32WD/32XD; Draw | (China) Wang Shixian; 22–20, 21–19 | (China) Li Xuerui |
| March 30 | India Open; New Delhi, India; Super Series $250,000 – 32MS/32WS/32MD/32WD/32XD; Draw | (Denmark) Mathias Boe (Denmark) Carsten Mogensen; 17–21, 21–15, 21–15 | (China) Liu Xiaolong (China) Qiu Zihan |
| March 30 | India Open; New Delhi, India; Super Series $250,000 – 32MS/32WS/32MD/32WD/32XD; Draw | (China) Tang Yuanting (China) Yu Yang; 21–10, 13–21, 21–16 | (South Korea) Jung Kyung-eun (South Korea) Kim Ha-na |
| March 30 | India Open; New Delhi, India; Super Series $250,000 – 32MS/32WS/32MD/32WD/32XD; Draw | (Denmark) Joachim Fischer Nielsen (Denmark) Christinna Pedersen; 21–16, 18–21, 21–18 | (South Korea) Ko Sung-hyun (South Korea) Kim Ha-na |
| March 30 | Osaka International; Osaka, Japan; International Challenge $15,000 – 32MS/32WS/32MD/32WD/32XD | (Hong Kong) Ng Ka Long; 21–13, 21–12 | (Japan) Riichi Takeshita |
| March 30 | Osaka International; Osaka, Japan; International Challenge $15,000 – 32MS/32WS/32MD/32WD/32XD | (Japan) Yui Hashimoto; 21–13, 21–14 | (Japan) Anna Doi |
| March 30 | Osaka International; Osaka, Japan; International Challenge $15,000 – 32MS/32WS/32MD/32WD/32XD | (Japan) Kenta Kazuno (Japan) Kazushi Yamada; 21–19, 21–11 | (South Korea) Jun Bong-chan (South Korea) Kim Duck-yong |
| March 30 | Osaka International; Osaka, Japan; International Challenge $15,000 – 32MS/32WS/32MD/32WD/32XD | (Japan) Shizuka Matsuo (Japan) Mami Naito; 24–22, 21–6 | (Japan) Kugo Asumi (Japan) Yui Miyauchi |
| March 30 | Osaka International; Osaka, Japan; International Challenge $15,000 – 32MS/32WS/32MD/32WD/32XD | (Indonesia) Muhammad Rijal (Indonesia) Vita Marissa; 21–18, 17–21, 21–18 | (South Korea) Choi Sol-gyu (South Korea) Chae Yoo-jung |
| March 30 | Finnish Open; Vantaa, Finland; International Challenge $15,000 – 32MS/32WS/32MD/32WD/32XD | (Denmark) Emil Holst; 21–6, 21–15 | (France) Lucas Corvée |
| March 30 | Finnish Open; Vantaa, Finland; International Challenge $15,000 – 32MS/32WS/32MD/32WD/32XD | (Denmark) Line Kjærsfeldt; 21–9, 13–2 Retired | (Denmark) Anna Thea Madsen |
| March 30 | Finnish Open; Vantaa, Finland; International Challenge $15,000 – 32MS/32WS/32MD/32WD/32XD | (Denmark) Kim Astrup (Denmark) Anders Skaarup Rasmussen; 21–18, 21–17 | (Chinese Taipei) Huang Po-jui (Chinese Taipei) Lu Ching-yao |
| March 30 | Finnish Open; Vantaa, Finland; International Challenge $15,000 – 32MS/32WS/32MD/32WD/32XD | (Denmark) Line Damkjær Kruse (Denmark) Marie Røpke; 21–17, 21–14 | (Bulgaria) Gabriela Stoeva (Bulgaria) Stefani Stoeva |
| March 30 | Finnish Open; Vantaa, Finland; International Challenge $15,000 – 32MS/32WS/32MD/32WD/32XD | (Denmark) Anders Skaarup Rasmussen (Denmark) Lena Grebak; 22–24, 21–19, 21–13 | (Sweden) Nico Ruponen (Sweden) Amanda Högström |

=== April ===
| Week of | Tournament | Champions | Runners-up |
|---|---|---|---|
| April 7 | World Junior Championships; Alor Setar, Malaysia; Suhandinata Cup | China; 3–0 | Indonesia |
| April 7 | Singapore Open; Singapore; Super Series $300,000 – 32MS/32WS/32MD/32WD/32XD; Draw | (Indonesia) Simon Santoso; 21–15, 21–10 | (Malaysia) Lee Chong Wei |
| April 7 | Singapore Open; Singapore; Super Series $300,000 – 32MS/32WS/32MD/32WD/32XD; Draw | (China) Wang Yihan; 21–11, 21–19 | (China) Li Xuerui |
| April 7 | Singapore Open; Singapore; Super Series $300,000 – 32MS/32WS/32MD/32WD/32XD; Draw | (China) Cai Yun (China) Lu Kai; 21–19, 21–14 | (Chinese Taipei) Lee Sheng-mu (Chinese Taipei) Tsai Chia-hsin |
| April 7 | Singapore Open; Singapore; Super Series $300,000 – 32MS/32WS/32MD/32WD/32XD; Draw | (China) Bao Yixin (China) Tang Jinhua; 14–21, 21–19, 21–15 | (Denmark) Christinna Pedersen (Denmark) Kamilla Rytter Juhl |
| April 7 | Singapore Open; Singapore; Super Series $300,000 – 32MS/32WS/32MD/32WD/32XD; Draw | (Indonesia) Tontowi Ahmad (Indonesia) Liliyana Natsir; 21–15, 22–20 | (Indonesia) Riky Widianto (Indonesia) Richi Puspita Dili |
| April 7 | Peru International; Lima, Peru; International Challenge $15,000 – 32MS/32WS/32MD/32WD/32XD | (Cuba) Osleni Guerrero; 21–17 21–13 | (United States) Hock Lai Lee |
| April 7 | Peru International; Lima, Peru; International Challenge $15,000 – 32MS/32WS/32MD/32WD/32XD | (United States) Beiwen Zhang; 27–25, 21–19 | (Canada) Michelle Li |
| April 7 | Peru International; Lima, Peru; International Challenge $15,000 – 32MS/32WS/32MD/32WD/32XD | (Belgium) Matijs Dierickx (Belgium) Freek Golinski; 17–21, 21–19, 21–13 | (United States) Christian Yahya Christianto (United States) Hock Lai Lee |
| April 7 | Peru International; Lima, Peru; International Challenge $15,000 – 32MS/32WS/32MD/32WD/32XD | (United States) Eva Lee (United States) Paula Lynn Obañana; 21–14, 21–15 | (Canada) Nicole Grether (Canada) Charmaine Reid |
| April 7 | Peru International; Lima, Peru; International Challenge $15,000 – 32MS/32WS/32MD/32WD/32XD | (United States) Christian Yahya Christianto (United States) Eva Lee; 21–16, 21–18 | (Canada) Derrick Ng (Canada) Michelle Li |
| April 7 | Croatian International; Zagreb, Croatia; International Series $5,000 – 32MS/32WS/32MD/32WD/32XD | (Germany) Lukas Schmidt; 21–14, 21–9 | (Austria) David Obernosterer |
| April 7 | Croatian International; Zagreb, Croatia; International Series $5,000 – 32MS/32WS/32MD/32WD/32XD | (Denmark) Mette Poulsen; 23–25, 21–19, 21–16 | (Turkey) Özge Bayrak |
| April 7 | Croatian International; Zagreb, Croatia; International Series $5,000 – 32MS/32WS/32MD/32WD/32XD | (Denmark) Mathias Christiansen (Denmark) David Daugaard; 21–8, 21–12 | (Denmark) Theodor Johansen (Denmark) Mads Pedersen |
| April 7 | Croatian International; Zagreb, Croatia; International Series $5,000 – 32MS/32WS/32MD/32WD/32XD | (Denmark) Julie Finne-Ipsen (Denmark) Rikke Hansen; 15–21, 21–17, 21–19 | (Denmark) Iben Bergstein (Denmark) Louise Seiersen |
| April 7 | Croatian International; Zagreb, Croatia; International Series $5,000 – 32MS/32WS/32MD/32WD/32XD | (Denmark) Niclas Nøhr (Denmark) Sara Thygesen; 21–15 13–21 21–18 | (Denmark) Mads Pedersen (Denmark) Mai Surrow |
| April 14 | World Junior Championships; Alor Setar, Malaysia; BWF Major Event; 128MS/128WS/64MD/64WD/128XD; Draw | (China) Lin Guipu; 20–22, 21–8, 21–18 | (China) Shi Yuqi |
| April 14 | World Junior Championships; Alor Setar, Malaysia; BWF Major Event; 128MS/128WS/64MD/64WD/128XD; Draw | (Japan) Akane Yamaguchi; 14–21, 21–18, 21–13 | (China) He Bingjiao |
| April 14 | World Junior Championships; Alor Setar, Malaysia; BWF Major Event; 128MS/128WS/64MD/64WD/128XD; Draw | (Thailand) Dechapol Puavaranukroh (Thailand) Kittinupong Kedren; 21–16, 21–18 | (Japan) Masahide Nakata (Japan) Katsuki Tamate |
| April 14 | World Junior Championships; Alor Setar, Malaysia; BWF Major Event; 128MS/128WS/64MD/64WD/128XD; Draw | (China) Chen Qingchen (China) Jia Yifan; 21–11, 21–14 | (Indonesia) Apriyani Rahayu (Indonesia) Rosyita Eka Putri Sari |
| April 14 | World Junior Championships; Alor Setar, Malaysia; BWF Major Event; 128MS/128WS/64MD/64WD/128XD; Draw | (China) Huang Kaixiang (China) Chen Qingchen; 21–12, 21–17 | (Indonesia) Muhammad Rian Ardianto (Indonesia) Rosyita Eka Putri Sari |
| April 14 | New Zealand Open; Auckland, Netherlands; Grand Prix $50,000 – 64MS/32WS/32MD/32WD/32XD; Draw | (Chinese Taipei) Wang Tzu-wei; 21–9, 21–13 | (Chinese Taipei) Hsu Jen-hao |
| April 14 | New Zealand Open; Auckland, Netherlands; Grand Prix $50,000 – 64MS/32WS/32MD/32WD/32XD; Draw | (Japan) Nozomi Okuhara; 21–15, 21–2 | (Japan) Kana Ito |
| April 14 | New Zealand Open; Auckland, Netherlands; Grand Prix $50,000 – 64MS/32WS/32MD/32WD/32XD; Draw | (Indonesia) Selvanus Geh (Indonesia) Kevin Sanjaya Sukamuljo; 15–21, 23–21, 21–11 | (Chinese Taipei) Chen Hung-ling (Chinese Taipei) Lu Chia-pin |
| April 14 | New Zealand Open; Auckland, Netherlands; Grand Prix $50,000 – 64MS/32WS/32MD/32WD/32XD; Draw | (Australia) Tang Hetian (Australia) Renuga Veeran; 21–13, 10–21, 21–18 | (Japan) Shizuka Matsuo (Japan) Mami Naito |
| April 14 | New Zealand Open; Auckland, Netherlands; Grand Prix $50,000 – 64MS/32WS/32MD/32WD/32XD; Draw | (Indonesia) Alfian Eko Prasetya (Indonesia) Annisa Saufika; 21–18, 17–21, 21–12 | (Indonesia) Edi Subaktiar (Indonesia) Melati Daeva Oktavianti |
| April 14 | China Masters; Jiangsu, China; Grand Prix Gold $250,000 – 32MS/16WS/32MD/16WD/32XD; Draw | (China) Lin Dan; 21–14, 21–9 | (China) Tian Houwei |
| April 14 | China Masters; Jiangsu, China; Grand Prix Gold $250,000 – 32MS/16WS/32MD/16WD/32XD; Draw | (China) Liu Xin; 21–12, 21–18 | (China) Shen Yaying |
| April 14 | China Masters; Jiangsu, China; Grand Prix Gold $250,000 – 32MS/16WS/32MD/16WD/32XD; Draw | (China) Kang Jun (China) Liu Cheng; 21–13, 21–16 | (China) Wang Yilyu (China) Zhang Wen |
| April 14 | China Masters; Jiangsu, China; Grand Prix Gold $250,000 – 32MS/16WS/32MD/16WD/32XD; Draw | (China) Luo Ying (China) Luo Yu; 21–17, 21–19 | (China) Huang Yaqiong (China) Yu Xiaohan |
| April 14 | China Masters; Jiangsu, China; Grand Prix Gold $250,000 – 32MS/16WS/32MD/16WD/32XD; Draw | (China) Lu Kai (China) Huang Yaqiong; 21–12, 21–14 | (China) Wang Yilyu (China) Xia Huan |
| April 14 | USM International Series; Semarang, Indonesia; International Series $5,000 – 64MS/32WS/32MD/32WD/32XD | (Indonesia) Setyaldi Putra Wibowo; 21–16, 18–21, 21–11 | (Indonesia) Fikri Ihsandi Hadmadi |
| April 14 | USM International Series; Semarang, Indonesia; International Series $5,000 – 64MS/32WS/32MD/32WD/32XD | (Indonesia) Febby Angguni; 21–14, 21–16 | (Indonesia) Ana Rovita |
| April 14 | USM International Series; Semarang, Indonesia; International Series $5,000 – 64MS/32WS/32MD/32WD/32XD | (Indonesia) Afiat Yuris Wirawan (Indonesia) Yohanes Rendy Sugiarto; 21–18, 21–17 | (Indonesia) Seiko Wahyu Kusdianto (Indonesia) Tedi Supriadi |
| April 14 | USM International Series; Semarang, Indonesia; International Series $5,000 – 64MS/32WS/32MD/32WD/32XD | (Indonesia) Dian Fitriani (Indonesia) Nadya Melati; 14–21, 21–12, 21–17 | (Indonesia) Komala Dewi (Indonesia) Meiliana Jauhari |
| April 14 | USM International Series; Semarang, Indonesia; International Series $5,000 – 64MS/32WS/32MD/32WD/32XD | (Indonesia) Lukhi Apri Nugroho (Indonesia) Masita Mahmudin; 23–21, 18–21, 21–14 | (Indonesia) Hafiz Faizal (Indonesia) Shella Devi Aulia |
| April 14 | Dutch International; Wateringen, Netherland; International Series $10,000 – 32MS/32WS/32MD/32WD/32XD | (Denmark) Rasmus Fladberg; Walkover | (Sri Lanka) Niluka Karunaratne |
| April 14 | Dutch International; Wateringen, Netherland; International Series $10,000 – 32MS/32WS/32MD/32WD/32XD | (Netherlands) Soraya de Visch Eijbergen; 21–15, 21–8 | (Germany) Fabienne Deprez |
| April 14 | Dutch International; Wateringen, Netherland; International Series $10,000 – 32MS/32WS/32MD/32WD/32XD | (Denmark) Kasper Antonsen (Denmark) Mikkel Delbo Larsen; 21–15, 21–18 | (Denmark) Rasmus Fladberg (Denmark) Emil Holst |
| April 14 | Dutch International; Wateringen, Netherland; International Series $10,000 – 32MS/32WS/32MD/32WD/32XD | (Netherlands) Samantha Barning (Netherlands) Iris Tabeling; 21–16, 21–12 | (Denmark) Maiken Fruergaard (Denmark) Sara Thygesen |
| April 14 | Dutch International; Wateringen, Netherland; International Series $10,000 – 32MS/32WS/32MD/32WD/32XD | (Denmark) Niclas Nøhr (Denmark) Sara Thygesen; 21–10, 21–5 | (Netherlands) Robin Tabeling (Netherlands) Myke Halkema |
| April 21 | Badminton Asia Championships; Gimcheon, South Korea; Continental Championships $200,000 – 32MS/32WS/32MD/32WD/32XD; Draw | (China) Lin Dan; 14–21, 21–9, 21–15 | (Japan) Sho Sasaki |
| April 21 | Badminton Asia Championships; Gimcheon, South Korea; Continental Championships $200,000 – 32MS/32WS/32MD/32WD/32XD; Draw | (South Korea) Sung Ji-hyun; 21–19, 21–15 | (China) Wang Shixian |
| April 21 | Badminton Asia Championships; Gimcheon, South Korea; Continental Championships $200,000 – 32MS/32WS/32MD/32WD/32XD; Draw | (South Korea) Shin Baek-cheol (South Korea) Yoo Yeon-seong; 22–20, 21–17 | (China) Li Junhui (China) Liu Yuchen |
| April 21 | Badminton Asia Championships; Gimcheon, South Korea; Continental Championships $200,000 – 32MS/32WS/32MD/32WD/32XD; Draw | (China) Luo Ying (China) Luo Yu; 21–18, 21–18 | (South Korea) Jung Kyung-eun (South Korea) Kim Ha-na |
| April 21 | Badminton Asia Championships; Gimcheon, South Korea; Continental Championships $200,000 – 32MS/32WS/32MD/32WD/32XD; Draw | (Hong Kong) Lee Chun Hei (Hong Kong) Chau Hoi Wah; 13–21, 21–15, 21–15 | (South Korea) Shin Baek-cheol (South Korea) Jang Ye-na |
| April 21 | Maribyrnong International; Maribyrnong, Australia; International Series $5,000 – 64MS/32WS/32MD/32WD/32XD | (Indonesia) Fikri Ihsandi Hadmadi; 21–17, 21–16 | (Malaysia) Jiann Shiarng Chiang |
| April 21 | Maribyrnong International; Maribyrnong, Australia; International Series $5,000 – 64MS/32WS/32MD/32WD/32XD | (Indonesia) Millicent Wiranto; 21–11, 19–21, 21–16 | (Chinese Taipei) Chiang Pei-hsin |
| April 21 | Maribyrnong International; Maribyrnong, Australia; International Series $5,000 – 64MS/32WS/32MD/32WD/32XD | (Malaysia) Jagdish Singh (Malaysia) Roni Tan Wee Long; 21–14, 21–19 | (Australia) Raymond Tam (Australia) Glenn Warfe |
| April 21 | Maribyrnong International; Maribyrnong, Australia; International Series $5,000 – 64MS/32WS/32MD/32WD/32XD | (Australia) Tang Hetian (Australia) Renuga Veeran; 21–19, 25–23 | (Chinese Taipei) Chiang Mei-hui (Indonesia) Setyana Mapasa |
| April 21 | Maribyrnong International; Maribyrnong, Australia; International Series $5,000 – 64MS/32WS/32MD/32WD/32XD | (Malaysia) Mohamad Arif Abdul Latif (Indonesia) Rusdina Antardayu Riodingin; 21–18, 21–11 | (Australia) Ross Smith (Australia) Renuga Veeran |
| April 21 | European Badminton Championships; Kazan, Russia; Continental Championships; 64MS/64WS/32MD/32WD/32XD; Draw | (Denmark) Jan Ø. Jørgensen; 21–18, 21–10 | (England) Rajiv Ouseph |
| April 21 | European Badminton Championships; Kazan, Russia; Continental Championships; 64MS/64WS/32MD/32WD/32XD; Draw | (Spain) Carolina Marín; 21–9, 14–21, 21–8 | (Denmark) Anna Thea Madsen |
| April 21 | European Badminton Championships; Kazan, Russia; Continental Championships; 64MS/64WS/32MD/32WD/32XD; Draw | (Russia) Vladimir Ivanov (Russia) Ivan Sozonov; 21–13, 21–16 | (Denmark) Mathias Boe (Denmark) Carsten Mogensen |
| April 21 | European Badminton Championships; Kazan, Russia; Continental Championships; 64MS/64WS/32MD/32WD/32XD; Draw | (Denmark) Christinna Pedersen (Denmark) Kamilla Rytter Juhl; 21–11, 21–11 | (Denmark) Line Damkjær Kruse (Denmark) Marie Røpke |
| April 21 | European Badminton Championships; Kazan, Russia; Continental Championships; 64MS/64WS/32MD/32WD/32XD; Draw | (Denmark) Joachim Fischer Nielsen (Denmark) Christinna Pedersen; 22–24, 21–13, 21–18 | (Denmark) Mads Pieler Kolding (Denmark) Kamilla Rytter Juhl |
| April 21 | African Badminton Championships; Gaborone, Botswana; Continental Championships; 10 Team/64MS/64WS/32MD/32WD/32XD; Draw | South Africa; 3–1 | Nigeria |
| April 21 | African Badminton Championships; Gaborone, Botswana; Continental Championships; 10 Team/64MS/64WS/32MD/32WD/32XD; Draw | (South Africa) Jacob Maliekal; 21–11, 21–17 | (Nigeria) Enejoh Abah |
| April 21 | African Badminton Championships; Gaborone, Botswana; Continental Championships; 10 Team/64MS/64WS/32MD/32WD/32XD; Draw | (Mauritius) Kate Foo Kune; 21–14, 14–21, 21–17 | (Nigeria) Grace Gabriel |
| April 21 | African Badminton Championships; Gaborone, Botswana; Continental Championships; 10 Team/64MS/64WS/32MD/32WD/32XD; Draw | (South Africa) Andries Malan (South Africa) Willem Viljoen; 21–8, 21–15 | (Nigeria) Enejoh Abah (Nigeria) Viktor Makanju |
| April 21 | African Badminton Championships; Gaborone, Botswana; Continental Championships; 10 Team/64MS/64WS/32MD/32WD/32XD; Draw | (Mauritius) Kate Foo Kune (Mauritius) Yeldy Louison; 21–17, 22–20 | (Seychelles) Juliette Ah-Wan (Seychelles) Alisen Camille |
| April 21 | African Badminton Championships; Gaborone, Botswana; Continental Championships; 10 Team/64MS/64WS/32MD/32WD/32XD; Draw | (South Africa) Willem Viljoen (South Africa) Michelle Butler-Emmett; 21–18, 21–17 | (South Africa) Andries Malan (South Africa) Jennifer Fry |
| April 28 | Smiling Fish International; Trang, Thailand; International Series $5,000 – 32MS/32WS/32MD/32WD/32XD | (Thailand) Khosit Phetpradab; 21–14, 19–21, 21–13 | (Indonesia) Andre Marteen |
| April 28 | Smiling Fish International; Trang, Thailand; International Series $5,000 – 32MS/32WS/32MD/32WD/32XD | (Japan) Rei Nagata; 21–12, 18–21, 21–18 | (Malaysia) Lee Ying Ying |
| April 28 | Smiling Fish International; Trang, Thailand; International Series $5,000 – 32MS/32WS/32MD/32WD/32XD | (Thailand) Watchara Buranakuea (Thailand) Trawut Potieng; 12–21, 21–18, 21–14 | (Thailand) Dechapol Puavaranukroh (Thailand) Kittinupong Kedren |
| April 28 | Smiling Fish International; Trang, Thailand; International Series $5,000 – 32MS/32WS/32MD/32WD/32XD | (Japan) Mayu Matsumoto (Japan) Wakana Nagahara; 21–17, 21–11 | (Thailand) Pacharapun Chochuwong (Thailand) Chanisa Teachavorasinskun |
| April 28 | Smiling Fish International; Trang, Thailand; International Series $5,000 – 32MS/32WS/32MD/32WD/32XD | (Thailand) Watchara Buranakuea (Thailand) Phataimas Muenwong; 21–19, 21–10 | (Thailand) Songphon Anugritayawon (Thailand) Natcha Saengchote |
| April 28 | Riga International; Riga, Latvia; Future Series; 32MS/32WS/32MD/16WD/32XD | (Estonia) Raul Must; 14–5, Retired | (Norway) Marius Myhre |
| April 28 | Riga International; Riga, Latvia; Future Series; 32MS/32WS/32MD/16WD/32XD | (Sweden) Matilda Petersen; 21–13, 21–15 | (Poland) Anna Narel |
| April 28 | Riga International; Riga, Latvia; Future Series; 32MS/32WS/32MD/16WD/32XD | (Finland) Kasper Lehikoinen (Finland) Marko Pyykonen; 21–12, 21–18 | (Poland) Mateusz Dubowski (Poland) Jacek Kołumbajew |
| April 28 | Riga International; Riga, Latvia; Future Series; 32MS/32WS/32MD/16WD/32XD | (Denmark) Emilie Juul Møller (Denmark) Cecilie Sentow; Walkover | (Estonia) Kati-Kreet Marran (Estonia) Sale-Liis Teesalu |
| April 28 | Riga International; Riga, Latvia; Future Series; 32MS/32WS/32MD/16WD/32XD | (Estonia) Kristjan Kaljurand (Estonia) Laura Tomband; 21–9, 10–21, 21–12 | (Belgium) Nick Marcoen (Belgium) Flore Vandenhoucke |

=== May ===
| Week of | Tournament | Champions | Runners-up |
|---|---|---|---|
| May 5 | Slovenia International; Medvode, Slovenia; International Series $5,000 – 32MS/32WS/32MD/32WD/32XD | (Denmark) Flemming Quach; 21–6, 21–13 | (Denmark) Christian Lind Thomsen |
| May 5 | Slovenia International; Medvode, Slovenia; International Series $5,000 – 32MS/32WS/32MD/32WD/32XD | (Bulgaria) Stefani Stoeva; 21–18, 21–14 | (Netherlands) Soraya de Visch Eijbergen |
| May 5 | Slovenia International; Medvode, Slovenia; International Series $5,000 – 32MS/32WS/32MD/32WD/32XD | (Croatia) Zvonimir Đurkinjak (Croatia) Zvonimir Hölbling; 21–15, 21–18 | (Russia) Nikita Khakimov (Russia) Vasily Kuznetsov |
| May 5 | Slovenia International; Medvode, Slovenia; International Series $5,000 – 32MS/32WS/32MD/32WD/32XD | (Bulgaria) Gabriela Stoeva (Bulgaria) Stefani Stoeva; 21–16, 21–17 | (Russia) Victoria Dergunova (Russia) Olga Morozova |
| May 5 | Slovenia International; Medvode, Slovenia; International Series $5,000 – 32MS/32WS/32MD/32WD/32XD | (Denmark) Jeppe Ludvigsen (Denmark) Mai Surrow; 13–21, 21–16, 21–15 | (Russia) Alexandr Zinchenko (Russia) Olga Morozova |
| May 12 | Hellas International; Sidirokastro, Greece; International Series $5,000 – 32MS/32WS/32MD/32WD/32XD | (Denmark) Kim Bruun; 21–16, 21–13 | (Poland) Michał Rogalski |
| May 12 | Hellas International; Sidirokastro, Greece; International Series $5,000 – 32MS/32WS/32MD/32WD/32XD | (Bulgaria) Linda Zetchiri; 21–13, 21–13 | (Republic of Ireland) Chloe Magee |
| May 12 | Hellas International; Sidirokastro, Greece; International Series $5,000 – 32MS/32WS/32MD/32WD/32XD | (Denmark) Mathias Christiansen (Denmark) David Daugaard; 0-0 Retired | (Denmark) Frederik Colberg (Denmark) Mikkel Mikkelsen |
| May 12 | Hellas International; Sidirokastro, Greece; International Series $5,000 – 32MS/32WS/32MD/32WD/32XD | (Turkey) Özge Bayrak (Turkey) Neslihan Yiğit; 21–7, 21–14 | (Russia) Elena Komendrovskaja (Russia) Viktoriia Vorobeva |
| May 12 | Hellas International; Sidirokastro, Greece; International Series $5,000 – 32MS/32WS/32MD/32WD/32XD | (Republic of Ireland) Sam Magee (Republic of Ireland) Chloe Magee; 21–14, 21–10 | (Bulgaria) Blagovest Kisyov (Bulgaria) Dimitria Popstoikova |
| May 19 | Thomas and Uber Cups; New Delhi, India; 16 teams (TC)/16 teams (UC); Draw | Japan; 3–2 | Malaysia |
| May 19 | Thomas and Uber Cups; New Delhi, India; 16 teams (TC)/16 teams (UC); Draw | China; 3–1 | Japan |
| May 19 | Spanish Open; Madrid, Spain; International Challenge $15,000 – 32MS/32WS/32MD/32WD/32XD | (Denmark) Joachim Persson; 21–12, 21–13 | (Denmark) Rasmus Fladberg |
| May 19 | Spanish Open; Madrid, Spain; International Challenge $15,000 – 32MS/32WS/32MD/32WD/32XD | (Scotland) Kirsty Gilmour; 21–19, 21–18 | (Spain) Carolina Marín |
| May 19 | Spanish Open; Madrid, Spain; International Challenge $15,000 – 32MS/32WS/32MD/32WD/32XD | (Poland) Łukasz Moreń (Poland) Wojciech Szkudlarczyk; 9–21, 21–15, 21–16 | (Poland) Adam Cwalina (Poland) Przemysław Wacha |
| May 19 | Spanish Open; Madrid, Spain; International Challenge $15,000 – 32MS/32WS/32MD/32WD/32XD | (Bulgaria) Gabriela Stoeva (Bulgaria) Stefani Stoeva; 21–14, 21–9 | (Scotland) Imogen Bankier (Scotland) Kirsty Gilmour |
| May 19 | Spanish Open; Madrid, Spain; International Challenge $15,000 – 32MS/32WS/32MD/32WD/32XD | (Scotland) Robert Blair (Scotland) Imogen Bankier; 21–13, 14–21, 21–16 | (Poland) Robert Mateusiak (Poland) Agnieszka Wojtkowska |

=== June ===
| Week of | Tournament | Champions | Runners-up |
|---|---|---|---|
| June 2 | Lagos International; Lagos, Nigeria; International Challenge $15,000 – 32MS/32WS/32MD/16WD/32XD | (Israel) Misha Zilberman; 21–15, 21–12 | (Austria) Luka Wraber |
| June 2 | Lagos International; Lagos, Nigeria; International Challenge $15,000 – 32MS/32WS/32MD/16WD/32XD | (Italy) Jeanine Cicognini; 21–10, 21–9 | (Slovakia) Martina Repiska |
| June 2 | Lagos International; Lagos, Nigeria; International Challenge $15,000 – 32MS/32WS/32MD/16WD/32XD | (South Africa) Andries Malan (South Africa) Willem Viljoen; 21–14, 22–20 | (Nigeria) Jinkan Ifraimu Bulus (Nigeria) Ola Fagbemi |
| June 2 | Lagos International; Lagos, Nigeria; International Challenge $15,000 – 32MS/32WS/32MD/16WD/32XD | (Nigeria) Dorcas Ajoke Adesokan (Nigeria) Braimoh Maria; 21–19, 22–20 | (Nigeria) Tosin Damilola Atolagbe (Nigeria) Fatima Azeez |
| June 2 | Lagos International; Lagos, Nigeria; International Challenge $15,000 – 32MS/32WS/32MD/16WD/32XD | (Nigeria) Enejoh Abah (Nigeria) Tosin Damilola Atolagbe; 26–24, 22–20 | (South Africa) Andries Malan (South Africa) Jennifer Fry |
| June 2 | Sri Lanka International; Colombo, Sri Lanka; International Challenge $15,000 – 64MS/32WS/32MD/32WD/32XD | (South Korea) Lee Hyun-il; 17–21, 21–10, 21–15 | (India) Anand Pawar |
| June 2 | Sri Lanka International; Colombo, Sri Lanka; International Challenge $15,000 – 64MS/32WS/32MD/32WD/32XD | (India) P. C. Thulasi; 17–21, 21–15, 21–18 | (Singapore) Chen Jiayuan |
| June 2 | Sri Lanka International; Colombo, Sri Lanka; International Challenge $15,000 – 64MS/32WS/32MD/32WD/32XD | (Singapore) Danny Bawa Chrisnanta (Singapore) Chayut Triyachart; 21–17, 21–19 | (India) Manu Attri (India) B. Sumeeth Reddy |
| June 2 | Sri Lanka International; Colombo, Sri Lanka; International Challenge $15,000 – 64MS/32WS/32MD/32WD/32XD | (Thailand) Phataimas Muenwong (Thailand) Kilasu Ostermeyer; 21–14, 21–17 | (India) Pradnya Gadre (India) N. Siki Reddy |
| June 2 | Sri Lanka International; Colombo, Sri Lanka; International Challenge $15,000 – 64MS/32WS/32MD/32WD/32XD | (India) Akshay Dewalkar (India) Pradnya Gadre; 21–16, 21–18 | (Malaysia) Vountus Indra Mawan (India) Prajakta Sawant |
| June 2 | Lithuanian International; Vilnius, Lithuania; Future Series; 32MS/32WS/32MD/16WD/32XD | (Finland) Kasper Lehikoinen; 18–21, 21–9, 21–13 | (Poland) Mateusz Dubowski |
| June 2 | Lithuanian International; Vilnius, Lithuania; Future Series; 32MS/32WS/32MD/16WD/32XD | (Poland) Anna Narel; 21–19, 21–19 | (Belarus) Alesia Zaitsava |
| June 2 | Lithuanian International; Vilnius, Lithuania; Future Series; 32MS/32WS/32MD/16WD/32XD | (Russia) Denis Grachev (Russia) Artem Karpov; Walkover | (Russia) Stanislav Pukhov (Russia) Sergey Sirant |
| June 2 | Lithuanian International; Vilnius, Lithuania; Future Series; 32MS/32WS/32MD/16WD/32XD | (Russia) Anastasia Dobrinina (Russia) Viktoriia Vorobeva; 21–19, 21–19 | (Estonia) Kristin Kuuba (Estonia) Helina Rüütel |
| June 2 | Lithuanian International; Vilnius, Lithuania; Future Series; 32MS/32WS/32MD/16WD/32XD | (Poland) Pawel Pietryja (Poland) Aneta Wojtkowska; 21–11, 21–13 | (Republic of Ireland) Ciaran Chambers (Republic of Ireland) Sinead Chambers |
| June 2 | Mercosul International; Foz do Iguaçu, Brazil; International Series $8,000 – 32MS/32WS/32MD/16WD/32XD | (Guatemala) Kevin Cordón; 21–14, 21–16 | (Guatemala) Rodolfo Ramirez |
| June 2 | Mercosul International; Foz do Iguaçu, Brazil; International Series $8,000 – 32MS/32WS/32MD/16WD/32XD | (United States) Iris Wang; 18–21, 21–17, 21–15 | (United States) Bo Rong |
| June 2 | Mercosul International; Foz do Iguaçu, Brazil; International Series $8,000 – 32MS/32WS/32MD/16WD/32XD | (Guatemala) Humblers Heymard (Guatemala) Anibal Marroquin; 14–21, 21–17, 21–13 | (Guatemala) Jonathan Solis (Guatemala) Rodolfo Ramirez |
| June 2 | Mercosul International; Foz do Iguaçu, Brazil; International Series $8,000 – 32MS/32WS/32MD/16WD/32XD | (Brazil) Lohaynny Vicente (Brazil) Luana Vicente; 21–11, 21–13 | (Brazil) Paula Pereira (Brazil) Fabiana Silva |
| June 2 | Mercosul International; Foz do Iguaçu, Brazil; International Series $8,000 – 32MS/32WS/32MD/16WD/32XD | (Denmark) Soeren Toft Hansen (United States) Bo Rong; 23–21, 21–13 | (Brazil) Hugo Arthuso (Brazil) Fabiana Silva |
| June 9 | Japan Open; Tokyo, Japan; Super Series $250,000 – 32MS/32WS/32MD/32WD/32XD; Draw | (Malaysia) Lee Chong Wei; 21–14, 21–12 | (Hong Kong) Hu Yun |
| June 9 | Japan Open; Tokyo, Japan; Super Series $250,000 – 32MS/32WS/32MD/32WD/32XD; Draw | (China) Li Xuerui; 21–16, 21–6 | (Chinese Taipei) Tai Tzu-ying |
| June 9 | Japan Open; Tokyo, Japan; Super Series $250,000 – 32MS/32WS/32MD/32WD/32XD; Draw | (South Korea) Lee Yong-dae (South Korea) Yoo Yeon-seong; 21–12, 26–24 | (Indonesia) Mohammad Ahsan (Indonesia) Hendra Setiawan |
| June 9 | Japan Open; Tokyo, Japan; Super Series $250,000 – 32MS/32WS/32MD/32WD/32XD; Draw | (Japan) Misaki Matsutomo (Japan) Ayaka Takahashi; 21–13, 21–17 | (Japan) Reika Kakiiwa (Japan) Miyuki Maeda |
| June 9 | Japan Open; Tokyo, Japan; Super Series $250,000 – 32MS/32WS/32MD/32WD/32XD; Draw | (China) Zhang Nan (China) Zhao Yunlei; 21–12, 21–16 | (Germany) Michael Fuchs (Germany) Birgit Michels |
| June 9 | Argentina International; Tandil, Argentina; International Series $5,000 – 32MS/32WS/32MD/16WD/32XD | (Guatemala) Kevin Cordón; 21–12, 21–18 | (Brazil) Daniel Paiola |
| June 9 | Argentina International; Tandil, Argentina; International Series $5,000 – 32MS/32WS/32MD/16WD/32XD | (United States) Iris Wang; 21–12, 21–15 | (United States) Bo Rong |
| June 9 | Argentina International; Tandil, Argentina; International Series $5,000 – 32MS/32WS/32MD/16WD/32XD | (Guatemala) Jonathan Solis (Guatemala) Rodolfo Ramirez; 21–15, 21–18 | (Brazil) Hugo Arthuso (Brazil) Daniel Paiola |
| June 9 | Argentina International; Tandil, Argentina; International Series $5,000 – 32MS/32WS/32MD/16WD/32XD | (Brazil) Lohaynny Vicente (Brazil) Luana Vicente; 18–21, 21–11, 21–15 | (Brazil) Paula Pereira (Brazil) Fabiana Silva |
| June 9 | Argentina International; Tandil, Argentina; International Series $5,000 – 32MS/32WS/32MD/16WD/32XD | (Brazil) Alex Yuwan Tjong (Brazil) Lohaynny Vicente; 21–19, 21–19 | (Brazil) Hugo Arthuso (Brazil) Fabiana Silva |
| June 9 | Mauritius International; Rose Hill, Mauritius; International Series $10,000 – 32MS/32WS/32MD/16WD/16XD | (Austria) Luka Wraber; 9–21, 21–18, 25–23 | (Austria) David Obernosterer |
| June 9 | Mauritius International; Rose Hill, Mauritius; International Series $10,000 – 32MS/32WS/32MD/16WD/16XD | (Italy) Jeanine Cicognini; 21–18, 21–10 | (Austria) Elisabeth Baldauf |
| June 9 | Mauritius International; Rose Hill, Mauritius; International Series $10,000 – 32MS/32WS/32MD/16WD/16XD | (Germany) Raphael Beck (Germany) Andreas Heinz; 18–21, 21–18, 22–20 | (Germany) Kai Schaefer (Germany) Tobias Wadenka |
| June 9 | Mauritius International; Rose Hill, Mauritius; International Series $10,000 – 32MS/32WS/32MD/16WD/16XD | (Germany) Annika Horbach (New Zealand) Maria Mata Masinipeni; 21–12, 21–12 | (Mauritius) Kate Foo Kune (Mauritius) Yeldy Louison |
| June 9 | Mauritius International; Rose Hill, Mauritius; International Series $10,000 – 32MS/32WS/32MD/16WD/16XD | (Germany) Andreas Heinz (Germany) Annika Horbach; 15–21, 21–18, 21–16 | (South Africa) Andries Malan (South Africa) Jennifer Fry |
| June 16 | Bahrain International; Isa Town, Bahrain; International Series $5,000 – 64MS/16WS/16MD/4WD/16XD | (India) Subhankar Dey; 21–19, 13–21, 21–11 | (Sri Lanka) Dinuka Karunaratna |
| June 16 | Bahrain International; Isa Town, Bahrain; International Series $5,000 – 64MS/16WS/16MD/4WD/16XD | (India) Riya Pillai; 21–18, 21–12 | (Austria) Elisabeth Baldauf |
| June 16 | Bahrain International; Isa Town, Bahrain; International Series $5,000 – 64MS/16WS/16MD/4WD/16XD | (Malaysia) Muhammad Hafifi Hashim (Malaysia) Muhammad Hafizi Hashim; 19–21, 22–20, 21–19 | (Bahrain) Jaffer Ebrahim (Bahrain) Heri Setiawan |
| June 16 | Bahrain International; Isa Town, Bahrain; International Series $5,000 – 64MS/16WS/16MD/4WD/16XD | (Uzbekistan) Surayyo Ahmadjonova (Uzbekistan) Mariya Pakina; 21–12, 18–21, 21–16 | (Uzbekistan) Anait Khurshudyan (Uzbekistan) Valeriya Mushtakova |
| June 16 | Bahrain International; Isa Town, Bahrain; International Series $5,000 – 64MS/16WS/16MD/4WD/16XD | (Austria) David Obernosterer (Austria) Elisabeth Baldauf; 21–13, 21–14 | (Bahrain) Heri Setiawan (Bahrain) Rehana Sunder |
| June 16 | Indonesia Open; Jakarta, Indonesia; Super Series Premier $750,000 – 32MS/32WS/32MD/32WD/32XD; Draw | (Denmark) Jan Ø. Jørgensen; 21–18, 21–18 | (Japan) Kenichi Tago |
| June 16 | Indonesia Open; Jakarta, Indonesia; Super Series Premier $750,000 – 32MS/32WS/32MD/32WD/32XD; Draw | (China) Li Xuerui; 21–13, 21–13 | (Thailand) Ratchanok Intanon |
| June 16 | Indonesia Open; Jakarta, Indonesia; Super Series Premier $750,000 – 32MS/32WS/32MD/32WD/32XD; Draw | (South Korea) Lee Yong-dae (South Korea) Yoo Yeon-seong; 21–15, 21–17 | (Indonesia) Mohammad Ahsan (Indonesia) Hendra Setiawan |
| June 16 | Indonesia Open; Jakarta, Indonesia; Super Series Premier $750,000 – 32MS/32WS/32MD/32WD/32XD; Draw | (China) Tian Qing (China) Zhao Yunlei; Walkover | (China) Ma Jin (China) Tang Yuanting |
| June 16 | Indonesia Open; Jakarta, Indonesia; Super Series Premier $750,000 – 32MS/32WS/32MD/32WD/32XD; Draw | (Denmark) Joachim Fischer Nielsen (Denmark) Christinna Pedersen; 18–21, 21–16, 21–14 | (China) Xu Chen (China) Ma Jin |
| June 16 | Venezuela International; Caracas, Venezuela; International Series $5,000 – 32MS/32WS/16MD/16WD/32XD | (Cuba) Osleni Guerrero; 21–13, 21–8 | (Brazil) Daniel Paiola |
| June 16 | Venezuela International; Caracas, Venezuela; International Series $5,000 – 32MS/32WS/16MD/16WD/32XD | (Brazil) Lohaynny Vicente; 22–20, 24–22 | (Brazil) Fabiana Silva |
| June 16 | Venezuela International; Caracas, Venezuela; International Series $5,000 – 32MS/32WS/16MD/16WD/32XD | (Brazil) Hugo Arthuso (Brazil) Daniel Paiola; 16–21, 21–18, 21–14 | (Brazil) Fabio da Silva Soares (Brazil) Alex Yuwan Tjong |
| June 16 | Venezuela International; Caracas, Venezuela; International Series $5,000 – 32MS/32WS/16MD/16WD/32XD | (Brazil) Lohaynny Vicente (Brazil) Luana Vicente; 21–13, 21–5 | (Brazil) Paula Pereira (Brazil) Fabiana Silva |
| June 16 | Venezuela International; Caracas, Venezuela; International Series $5,000 – 32MS/32WS/16MD/16WD/32XD | (Czech Republic) Milan Ludik (United States) Bo Rong; 21–16, 21–16 | (Peru) Mario Cuba (Peru) Katherine Winder |
| June 16 | Kenya International; Nairobi, Kenya; International Series $5,000 – 32MS/32WS/16MD/16WD/16XD | (Iran) Farzin Khanjani; 24–22, 21–9 | (Austria) Luka Wraber |
| June 16 | Kenya International; Nairobi, Kenya; International Series $5,000 – 32MS/32WS/16MD/16WD/16XD | (Italy) Jeanine Cicognini; 21–16, 13–21, 21–16 | (Nigeria) Grace Gabriel |
| June 16 | Kenya International; Nairobi, Kenya; International Series $5,000 – 32MS/32WS/16MD/16WD/16XD | (Iran) Vatannejad-Soroush Eskandari (Iran) Hasan Motaghi; 21–15, 21–13 | (Iran) Farzin Khanjani (Iran) Mehran Shahbazi |
| June 16 | Kenya International; Nairobi, Kenya; International Series $5,000 – 32MS/32WS/16MD/16WD/16XD | (Iran) Negin Amiripour (Iran) Pegah Kamrani; 24–22, 21–15 | (Iran) Sara Delavari (Iran) Sorayya Aghaei |
| June 16 | Kenya International; Nairobi, Kenya; International Series $5,000 – 32MS/32WS/16MD/16WD/16XD | (Zambia) Donald Mabo (Zambia) Ogar Siamupangila; 4–21, 23–21, 21–16 | (Kenya) Patrick Kinyua Mbogo (Kenya) Mercy Joseph |
| June 23 | European Club Championships; Amiens, France; CC Team Championships; 15 teams | (Russia) Primorye; 4–1 | (France) BC Chambly Oise |
| June 23 | Australian Open; Sydney, Australia; Super Series $750,000 – 32MS/32WS/32MD/32WD/32XD; Draw | (China) Lin Dan; 22–24, 21–16, 21–7 | (Indonesia) Simon Santoso |
| June 23 | Australian Open; Sydney, Australia; Super Series $750,000 – 32MS/32WS/32MD/32WD/32XD; Draw | (India) Saina Nehwal; 21–18, 21–11 | (Spain) Carolina Marín |
| June 23 | Australian Open; Sydney, Australia; Super Series $750,000 – 32MS/32WS/32MD/32WD/32XD; Draw | (South Korea) Lee Yong-dae (South Korea) Yoo Yeon-seong; 21–14, 21–18 | (Chinese Taipei) Lee Sheng-mu (Chinese Taipei) Tsai Chia-hsin |
| June 23 | Australian Open; Sydney, Australia; Super Series $750,000 – 32MS/32WS/32MD/32WD/32XD; Draw | (China) Tian Qing (China) Zhao Yunlei; 21–15, 21–9 | (Japan) Misaki Matsutomo (Japan) Ayaka Takahashi |
| June 23 | Australian Open; Sydney, Australia; Super Series $750,000 – 32MS/32WS/32MD/32WD/32XD; Draw | (South Korea) Ko Sung-hyun (South Korea) Kim Ha-na; 1–16, 21–17 | (Germany) Michael Fuchs (Germany) Birgit Michels |
| June 30 | Canada Open; Vancouver, British Columbia, Canada; Grand Prix $50,000 – 64MS/32WS/32MD/32WD/32XD; Draw | (South Korea) Lee Hyun-il; 21–16, 21–14 | (Hong Kong) Ng Ka Long |
| June 30 | Canada Open; Vancouver, British Columbia, Canada; Grand Prix $50,000 – 64MS/32WS/32MD/32WD/32XD; Draw | (Canada) Michelle Li; 21–16, 23–21 | (Chinese Taipei) Pai Yu-po |
| June 30 | Canada Open; Vancouver, British Columbia, Canada; Grand Prix $50,000 – 64MS/32WS/32MD/32WD/32XD; Draw | (Chinese Taipei) Liang Jui-wei (Chinese Taipei) Lu Chia-pin; 21–18, 16–21, 21–16 | (Chinese Taipei) Liao Min-chun (Chinese Taipei) Tseng Min-hao |
| June 30 | Canada Open; Vancouver, British Columbia, Canada; Grand Prix $50,000 – 64MS/32WS/32MD/32WD/32XD; Draw | (South Korea) Choi Hye-in (South Korea) Lee So-hee; 21–15, 21–18 | (South Korea) Park So-young (South Korea) Park Sun-young |
| June 30 | Canada Open; Vancouver, British Columbia, Canada; Grand Prix $50,000 – 64MS/32WS/32MD/32WD/32XD; Draw | (Germany) Max Schwenger (Germany) Carla Nelte; 21–18, 23–21 | (Netherlands) Jorrit de Ruiter (Netherlands) Samantha Barning |
| June 30 | White Nights; Gatchina, Russia; International Challenge $15,000 – 64MS/32WS/32MD/32WD/32XD | (Germany) Dieter Domke; 21–16, 25–23 | (France) Thomas Rouxel |
| June 30 | White Nights; Gatchina, Russia; International Challenge $15,000 – 64MS/32WS/32MD/32WD/32XD | (Bulgaria) Petya Nedelcheva; 21–14, 21–17 | (Bulgaria) Stefani Stoeva |
| June 30 | White Nights; Gatchina, Russia; International Challenge $15,000 – 64MS/32WS/32MD/32WD/32XD | (Poland) Lukasz Moren (Poland) Wojciech Szkudlarczyk; 21–18, 21–17 | (Germany) Raphael Beck (Germany) Andreas Heinz |
| June 30 | White Nights; Gatchina, Russia; International Challenge $15,000 – 64MS/32WS/32MD/32WD/32XD | (Russia) Ekaterina Bolotova (Russia) Evgeniya Kosetskaya; 21–14, 26–24 | (Russia) Olga Golovanova (Russia) Viktoriia Vorobeva |
| June 30 | White Nights; Gatchina, Russia; International Challenge $15,000 – 64MS/32WS/32MD/32WD/32XD | (Russia) Evgenij Dremin (Russia) Evgenia Dimova; 21–17, 21–12 | (Poland) Robert Mateusiak (Poland) Agnieszka Wojtkowska |

=== July ===
| Week of | Tournament | Champions | Runners-up |
|---|---|---|---|
| July 7 | U.S. Open; New York City, United States; Grand Prix Gold $120,000 – 64MS/32WS/32MD/32WD/32XD; Draw | (Vietnam) Nguyễn Tiến Minh; 21–19, 14–21, 21–19 | (Chinese Taipei) Chou Tien-chen |
| July 7 | U.S. Open; New York City, United States; Grand Prix Gold $120,000 – 64MS/32WS/32MD/32WD/32XD; Draw | (United States) Beiwen Zhang; 21–8, 21–17 | (Japan) Kana Ito |
| July 7 | U.S. Open; New York City, United States; Grand Prix Gold $120,000 – 64MS/32WS/32MD/32WD/32XD; Draw | (Thailand) Maneepong Jongjit (Thailand) Nipitphon Phuangphuapet; 21–17, 15–21, 21–18 | (Denmark) Mathias Boe (Denmark) Carsten Mogensen |
| July 7 | U.S. Open; New York City, United States; Grand Prix Gold $120,000 – 64MS/32WS/32MD/32WD/32XD; Draw | (Indonesia) Shendy Puspa Irawati (Indonesia) Vita Marissa; 21–15, 21–10 | (Thailand) Puttita Supajirakul (Thailand) Sapsiree Taerattanachai |
| July 7 | U.S. Open; New York City, United States; Grand Prix Gold $120,000 – 64MS/32WS/32MD/32WD/32XD; Draw | (Indonesia) Muhammad Rijal (Indonesia) Vita Marissa; 21–16, 21–19 | (Thailand) Maneepong Jongjit (Thailand) Sapsiree Taerattanachai |
| July 14 | Chinese Taipei Open; Taipei, Chinese Taipei; Grand Prix Gold $200,000 – 64MS/32WS/32MD/32WD/32XD; Draw | (China) Lin Dan; 21–19, 21–14 | (China) Wang Zhengming |
| July 14 | Chinese Taipei Open; Taipei, Chinese Taipei; Grand Prix Gold $200,000 – 64MS/32WS/32MD/32WD/32XD; Draw | (South Korea) Sung Ji-hyun; 21–13, 21–18 | (China) Liu Xin |
| July 14 | Chinese Taipei Open; Taipei, Chinese Taipei; Grand Prix Gold $200,000 – 64MS/32WS/32MD/32WD/32XD; Draw | (Indonesia) Andrei Adistia (Indonesia) Hendra Aprida Gunawan; 21–14, 16–21, 21–16 | (China) Li Junhui (China) Liu Yuchen |
| July 14 | Chinese Taipei Open; Taipei, Chinese Taipei; Grand Prix Gold $200,000 – 64MS/32WS/32MD/32WD/32XD; Draw | (Indonesia) Nitya Krishinda Maheswari (Indonesia) Greysia Polii; 21–18, 21–11 | (China) Wang Xiaoli (China) Yu Yang |
| July 14 | Chinese Taipei Open; Taipei, Chinese Taipei; Grand Prix Gold $200,000 – 64MS/32WS/32MD/32WD/32XD; Draw | (China) Liu Yuchen (China) Yu Xiaohan; 21–16, 21–18 | (Indonesia) Alfian Eko Prasetya (Indonesia) Annisa Saufika |
| July 21 | Commonwealth Games; Glasgow, Scotland; Multisports; 23 teams/32MS/32WS/32MD/32WD/32XD; Draw | Malaysia; 3–1 | England |
| July 21 | Commonwealth Games; Glasgow, Scotland; Multisports; 23 teams/32MS/32WS/32MD/32WD/32XD; Draw | (India) Kashyap Parupalli; 21–14, 11–21, 21–19 | (Singapore) Derek Wong |
| July 21 | Commonwealth Games; Glasgow, Scotland; Multisports; 23 teams/32MS/32WS/32MD/32WD/32XD; Draw | (Canada) Michelle Li; 21–14, 21–7 | (Scotland) Kirsty Gilmour |
| July 21 | Commonwealth Games; Glasgow, Scotland; Multisports; 23 teams/32MS/32WS/32MD/32WD/32XD; Draw | (Malaysia) Goh V Shem (Malaysia) Tan Wee Kiong; 21–12, 12–21, 21–15 | (Singapore) Danny Bawa Chrisnanta (Singapore) Chayut Triyachart |
| July 21 | Commonwealth Games; Glasgow, Scotland; Multisports; 23 teams/32MS/32WS/32MD/32WD/32XD; Draw | (Malaysia) Vivian Hoo (Malaysia) Woon Khe Wei; 21–17, 23–21 | (India) Jwala Gutta (India) Ashwini Ponnappa |
| July 21 | Commonwealth Games; Glasgow, Scotland; Multisports; 23 teams/32MS/32WS/32MD/32WD/32XD; Draw | (England) Chris Adcock (England) Gabby Adcock; 21–9, 21–12 | (England) Chris Langridge (England) Heather Olver |
| July 21 | Russian Open; Vladivostok, Russia; Grand Prix $50,000 – 64MS/32WS/16MD/16WD/32XD; Draw | (Russia) Vladimir Ivanov; 18–21, 21–5, 21–17 | (Japan) Riichi Takeshita |
| July 21 | Russian Open; Vladivostok, Russia; Grand Prix $50,000 – 64MS/32WS/16MD/16WD/32XD; Draw | (Japan) Aya Ohori; 21–19, 21–4 | (Japan) Shizuka Uchida |
| July 21 | Russian Open; Vladivostok, Russia; Grand Prix $50,000 – 64MS/32WS/16MD/16WD/32XD; Draw | (Japan) Kenta Kazuno (Japan) Kazushi Yamada; 19–21, 22–20, 21–13 | (Japan) Takuto Inoue (Japan) Yuki Kaneko |
| July 21 | Russian Open; Vladivostok, Russia; Grand Prix $50,000 – 64MS/32WS/16MD/16WD/32XD; Draw | (Japan) Yuriko Miki (Japan) Koharu Yonemoto; 21–17, 21–7 | (Japan) Mayu Matsumoto (Japan) Wakana Nagahara |
| July 21 | Russian Open; Vladivostok, Russia; Grand Prix $50,000 – 64MS/32WS/16MD/16WD/32XD; Draw | (Japan) Ryota Taohata (Japan) Misato Aratama; 21–12, 21–10 | (Russia) Ivan Sozonov (Russia) Olga Morozova |
| July 28 | World University Badminton Championships; Cordoba, Spain; Multi-sports events (University); 16XT/32MS/32WS/32MD/32WD/32XD | (China) China; 3–0 | Malaysia |
| July 28 | World University Badminton Championships; Cordoba, Spain; Multi-sports events (University); 16XT/32MS/32WS/32MD/32WD/32XD | (China) Gao Huan; 21–15, 15–21, 22–20 | (Malaysia) Iskandar Zulkarnain Zainuddin |
| July 28 | World University Badminton Championships; Cordoba, Spain; Multi-sports events (University); 16XT/32MS/32WS/32MD/32WD/32XD | (China) Liu Xin; 21–19, 12–21, 21–16 | (Chinese Taipei) Pai Yu-po |
| July 28 | World University Badminton Championships; Cordoba, Spain; Multi-sports events (University); 16XT/32MS/32WS/32MD/32WD/32XD | (Malaysia) Mohamad Arif Abdul Latif (Malaysia) Iskandar Zulkarnain Zainuddin; 21–16, 21–19 | (China) Gao Junjie (China) Zhang Zhijun |
| July 28 | World University Badminton Championships; Cordoba, Spain; Multi-sports events (University); 16XT/32MS/32WS/32MD/32WD/32XD | (China) Ou Dongni (China) Tang Yuanting; 21–13, 21–8 | (Japan) Mirai Shinoda (Japan) Natsumi Uratani |
| July 28 | World University Badminton Championships; Cordoba, Spain; Multi-sports events (University); 16XT/32MS/32WS/32MD/32WD/32XD | (China) Liu Cheng (China) Tang Yuanting; 21–12, 21–11 | (China) Zhang Zhijun (China) Ou Dongni |

=== August ===
| Week of | Tournament | Champions | Runners-up |
|---|---|---|---|
| August 3 | European University Games; Rotterdam, Netherlands; Multi-sports events (University); 16XT/32MS/32WS/32MD/32WD/32XD | (Germany) Duisburg-Essen; 3–2 | (Turkey) Uludag |
| August 3 | European University Games; Rotterdam, Netherlands; Multi-sports events (University); 16XT/32MS/32WS/32MD/32WD/32XD | (Germany) Alexander Roovers; Duisburg-Essen; 15–21, 21–7, 22–20 | (Poland) Mateusz Dubowski; Opole |
| August 3 | European University Games; Rotterdam, Netherlands; Multi-sports events (University); 16XT/32MS/32WS/32MD/32WD/32XD | (Turkey) Neslihan Yiğit; Uludag; 21–9, 23–25, 21–19 | (Russia) Anastasia Chervyakova; Nizhny Novgorod |
| August 3 | European University Games; Rotterdam, Netherlands; Multi-sports events (University); 16XT/32MS/32WS/32MD/32WD/32XD | (France) Jordan Corvée (France) William Goudallier; Bordeaux; 14–21, 21–14, 21–19 | (Netherlands) Jim Middelburg (Netherlands) Lester Oey; Radboud |
| August 3 | European University Games; Rotterdam, Netherlands; Multi-sports events (University); 16XT/32MS/32WS/32MD/32WD/32XD | (Turkey) Cemre Fere (Turkey) Neslihan Kılıç; Uludag; 21–13, 21–8 | (Germany) Anika Dörr (Germany) Linda Efler; Duisburg-Essen |
| August 3 | European University Games; Rotterdam, Netherlands; Multi-sports events (University); 16XT/32MS/32WS/32MD/32WD/32XD | (Ukraine) Vitaly Konov (Ukraine) Yelyzaveta Zharka; Kharkov; 21–7, 20–22, 21–15 | (Netherlands) Jim Middelburg (Netherlands) Judith Campman; Radboud |
| August 3 | Brasil Open; Rio de Janeiro, Brazil; Grand Prix $50,000 – 64MS/32WS/32MD/16WD/32XD; Draw | (Republic of Ireland) Scott Evans; 7–11, 6–11, 11–6, 11–8, 11–7 | (Germany) Dieter Domke |
| August 3 | Brasil Open; Rio de Janeiro, Brazil; Grand Prix $50,000 – 64MS/32WS/32MD/16WD/32XD; Draw | (United States) Beiwen Zhang; 6–11, 11–5, 4–11, 11–8, 11–9 | (Japan) Kaori Imabeppu |
| August 3 | Brasil Open; Rio de Janeiro, Brazil; Grand Prix $50,000 – 64MS/32WS/32MD/16WD/32XD; Draw | (Germany) Max Schwenger (Germany) Josche Zurwonne; 11–9, 11–6, 11–4 | (Germany) Raphael Beck (Germany) Andreas Heinz |
| August 3 | Brasil Open; Rio de Janeiro, Brazil; Grand Prix $50,000 – 64MS/32WS/32MD/16WD/32XD; Draw | (Germany) Johanna Goliszewski (Germany) Carla Nelte; 11–5, 11–7, 4–11, 11–10 | (Bulgaria) Gabriela Stoeva (Bulgaria) Stefani Stoeva |
| August 3 | Brasil Open; Rio de Janeiro, Brazil; Grand Prix $50,000 – 64MS/32WS/32MD/16WD/32XD; Draw | (Germany) Max Schwenger (Germany) Carla Nelte; 10–11, 10–11, 11–10, 11–8, 11–7 | (Republic of Ireland) Sam Magee (Republic of Ireland) Chloe Magee |
| August 10 | Indonesia International; Jakarta, Indonesia; International Challenge $20,000 – 64MS/32WS/32MD/32WD/32XD | (South Korea) Lee Hyun-il; 11–10, 9–11, 5–11, 11–8, 11–2 | (Indonesia) Jonatan Christie |
| August 10 | Indonesia International; Jakarta, Indonesia; International Challenge $20,000 – 64MS/32WS/32MD/32WD/32XD | (Japan) Mayu Matsumoto; 11–10, 10–11, 11–6, 10–11, 11–9 | (Indonesia) Hera Desi |
| August 10 | Indonesia International; Jakarta, Indonesia; International Challenge $20,000 – 64MS/32WS/32MD/32WD/32XD | (Indonesia) Fajar Alfian (Indonesia) Muhammad Rian Ardianto; 9–11, 11–9, 11–9, 11–8 | (Indonesia) Fran Kurniawan (Indonesia) Agripina Prima Rahmanto Putra |
| August 10 | Indonesia International; Jakarta, Indonesia; International Challenge $20,000 – 64MS/32WS/32MD/32WD/32XD | (Indonesia) Suci Rizky Andini (Indonesia) Tiara Rosalia Nuraidah; 11–6, 11–9, 11–6 | (Indonesia) Shendy Puspa Irawati (Indonesia) Vita Marissa |
| August 10 | Indonesia International; Jakarta, Indonesia; International Challenge $20,000 – 64MS/32WS/32MD/32WD/32XD | (Indonesia) Ronald Alexander (Indonesia) Melati Daeva Oktavianti; 7–11, 11–4, 11–6, 11–7 | (Indonesia) Muhammad Rijal (Indonesia) Vita Marissa |
| August 10 | Chile International; Temuco, Chile; International Series $5,000 – 32MS/32WS/16MD/16WD/32XD | (Guatemala) Kevin Cordón; 9–11, 11–9, 11–2, 11–6 | (Guatemala) Rodolfo Ramírez |
| August 10 | Chile International; Temuco, Chile; International Series $5,000 – 32MS/32WS/16MD/16WD/32XD | (United States) Bo Rong; 11–5, 11–9, 11–10 | (Peru) Luz María Zornoza |
| August 10 | Chile International; Temuco, Chile; International Series $5,000 – 32MS/32WS/16MD/16WD/32XD | (France) Arnaud Genin (United States) Bjorn Seguin; 11–7, 11–10, 10–11, 11–9 | (Peru) Mario Cuba (Peru) Martín del Valle |
| August 10 | Chile International; Temuco, Chile; International Series $5,000 – 32MS/32WS/16MD/16WD/32XD | (Peru) Katherine Winder (Peru) Luz María Zornoza; 11–2, 11–8, 11–2 | (Brazil) Ana Paula Campos (Peru) Camila Duany |
| August 10 | Chile International; Temuco, Chile; International Series $5,000 – 32MS/32WS/16MD/16WD/32XD | (Peru) Mario Cuba (Peru) Katherine Winder; 11–2, 8–11, 11–10, 11–10 | (Peru) Andrés Corpancho (Peru) Luz María Zornoza |
| August 10 | Carebaco International; Kingston, Jamaica; Future Series; 32MS/16WS/8MD/8WD/16XD | (Jamaica) Gareth Henry; 21–17, 21–15 | (Jamaica) Anthony McNee |
| August 10 | Carebaco International; Kingston, Jamaica; Future Series; 32MS/16WS/8MD/8WD/16XD | (Trinidad and Tobago) Solángel Guzmán; 21–4, 21–11 | (Barbados) Tamisha Williams |
| August 10 | Carebaco International; Kingston, Jamaica; Future Series; 32MS/16WS/8MD/8WD/16XD | (Jamaica) Gareth Henry (Jamaica) Garron Palmer; 21–19, 29–27 | (Jamaica) Wilroy Myles (Jamaica) Jamari Rose |
| August 10 | Carebaco International; Kingston, Jamaica; Future Series; 32MS/16WS/8MD/8WD/16XD | (Barbados) Shari Watson (Barbados) Tamisha Williams; 21–11, 21–17 | (Jamaica) Mikaylia Haldane (Jamaica) Geordine Henry |
| August 10 | Carebaco International; Kingston, Jamaica; Future Series; 32MS/16WS/8MD/8WD/16XD | (Jamaica) Garron Palmer (Jamaica) Mikaylia Haldane; 21–19, 21–15 | (Jamaica) Jamari Rose (Jamaica) Terry Leyow-Walker |
| August 17 | Youth Olympic Games; Nanjing, China; Multisports; 32MS/32WS/64XD; Draw | (China) Shi Yuqi; 21–15, 21–19 | (China) Lin Guipu |
| August 17 | Youth Olympic Games; Nanjing, China; Multisports; 32MS/32WS/64XD; Draw | (China) He Bingjiao; 22–24, 23–21, 21–17 | (Japan) Akane Yamaguchi |
| August 17 | Youth Olympic Games; Nanjing, China; Multisports; 32MS/32WS/64XD; Draw | (Malaysia) Cheam June Wei (Hong Kong) Ng Tsz Yau; 21–14, 23–21 | (Japan) Kanta Tsuneyama (Chinese Taipei) Lee Chia-hsin |
| August 17 | Bulgarian Eurasia Open; Sofia, Bulgaria; International Series $5,000 – 32MS/32WS/32MD/32WD/32XD | (Estonia) Raul Must; 11–6, 10–11, 8–11, 11–10, 11–9 | (Poland) Michał Rogalski |
| August 17 | Bulgarian Eurasia Open; Sofia, Bulgaria; International Series $5,000 – 32MS/32WS/32MD/32WD/32XD | (Bulgaria) Petya Nedelcheva; 11–8, 11–6, 11–7 | (Turkey) Özge Bayrak |
| August 17 | Bulgarian Eurasia Open; Sofia, Bulgaria; International Series $5,000 – 32MS/32WS/32MD/32WD/32XD | (France) Toma Junior Popov (France) Thomas Vallez; 11–10, 11–10, 11–9 | (France) Ronan Guéguin (France) Alexandre Hammer |
| August 17 | Bulgarian Eurasia Open; Sofia, Bulgaria; International Series $5,000 – 32MS/32WS/32MD/32WD/32XD | (Turkey) Özge Bayrak (Turkey) Neslihan Yiğit; 11–5, 11–5, 8–11, 10–11, 11–7 | (Bulgaria) Petya Nedelcheva (Bulgaria) Dimitriia Popstoikova |
| August 17 | Bulgarian Eurasia Open; Sofia, Bulgaria; International Series $5,000 – 32MS/32WS/32MD/32WD/32XD | (France) Alexandre Hammer (France) Joanna Chaube; 7–11, 11–8, 11–10, 11–9 | (Bulgaria) Stilian Makarski (Switzerland) Céline Tripet |
| August 17 | Singapore International Series; Singapore; International Series $5,000 – 64MS/32WS/32MD/32WD/32XD | (Singapore) Loh Kean Yew; 19–21, 21–14, 11–1 Retired | (Thailand) Kantaphon Wangcharoen |
| August 17 | Singapore International Series; Singapore; International Series $5,000 – 64MS/32WS/32MD/32WD/32XD | (Thailand) Supanida Katethong; 21–11, 22–20 | (Indonesia) Millicent Wiranto |
| August 17 | Singapore International Series; Singapore; International Series $5,000 – 64MS/32WS/32MD/32WD/32XD | (Chinese Taipei) Huang Po-jui (Chinese Taipei) Lu Ching-yao; 21–14, 15–21, 21–16 | (Malaysia) Jagdish Singh (Malaysia) Roni Tan Wee Long |
| August 17 | Singapore International Series; Singapore; International Series $5,000 – 64MS/32WS/32MD/32WD/32XD | (Japan) Naoko Fukuman (Japan) Kurumi Yonao; 21–16, 21–11 | (Thailand) Pacharapun Chochuwong (Thailand) Chanisa Teachavorasinskun |
| August 17 | Singapore International Series; Singapore; International Series $5,000 – 64MS/32WS/32MD/32WD/32XD | (Singapore) Terry Hee (Singapore) Tan Wei Han; 21–19, 19–21, 21–14 | (Singapore) Loh Kean Hean (Singapore) Dellis Yuliana |
| August 17 | Slovak Open; Trenčín, Slovakia; Future Series; 32MS/32WS/32MD/16WD/32XD | (Austria) Matthias Almer; 11–2, 11–9, 11–5 | (Netherlands) Justin Teeuwen |
| August 17 | Slovak Open; Trenčín, Slovakia; Future Series; 32MS/32WS/32MD/16WD/32XD | (Poland) Anna Narel; 11–5, 8–11, 11–8, 11–5 | (Ukraine) Hrystyna Dzhangobekova |
| August 17 | Slovak Open; Trenčín, Slovakia; Future Series; 32MS/32WS/32MD/16WD/32XD | (England) Ben Lane (England) Sean Vendy; 11–10, 11–5, 11–10 | (Czech Republic) Pavel Drančák (Czech Republic) Jaromír Janáček |
| August 17 | Slovak Open; Trenčín, Slovakia; Future Series; 32MS/32WS/32MD/16WD/32XD | (Croatia) Katarina Galenić (Netherlands) Cheryl Seinen; 11–7, 11–9, 5–11, 11–7 | (Poland) Magdalena Witek (Poland) Aneta Wojtkowska |
| August 17 | Slovak Open; Trenčín, Slovakia; Future Series; 32MS/32WS/32MD/16WD/32XD | (Poland) Paweł Pietryja (Poland) Aneta Wojtkowska; 9–11, 11–5, 11–9, 7–11, 11–8 | (Switzerland) Oliver Schaller (Switzerland) Céline Burkart |
| August 24 | World Championships; Copenhagen, Denmark; BWF Major Event; 64MS/64WS/48MD/48WD/48XD; Draw | (China) Chen Long; 21–19, 21–19 | (Malaysia) ~~Lee Chong Wei~~ disqualified for doping |
| August 24 | World Championships; Copenhagen, Denmark; BWF Major Event; 64MS/64WS/48MD/48WD/48XD; Draw | (Spain) Carolina Marín; 17–21, 21–17, 21–18 | (China) Li Xuerui |
| August 24 | World Championships; Copenhagen, Denmark; BWF Major Event; 64MS/64WS/48MD/48WD/48XD; Draw | (South Korea) Ko Sung-hyun (South Korea) Shin Baek-cheol; 22–20, 21–23, 21–18 | (South Korea) Lee Yong-dae (South Korea) Yoo Yeon-seong |
| August 24 | World Championships; Copenhagen, Denmark; BWF Major Event; 64MS/64WS/48MD/48WD/48XD; Draw | (China) Tian Qing (China) Zhao Yunlei; 21–19, 21–15 | (China) Wang Xiaoli (China) Yu Yang |
| August 24 | World Championships; Copenhagen, Denmark; BWF Major Event; 64MS/64WS/48MD/48WD/48XD; Draw | (China) Zhang Nan (China) Zhao Yunlei; 21–12, 21–23, 21–13 | (China) Xu Chen (China) Ma Jin |

=== September ===
| Week of | Tournament | Champions | Runners-up |
|---|---|---|---|
| September 1 | Vietnam Open; Ho Chi Minh City, Vietnam; Grand Prix $50,000 – 64MS/32WS/32MD/32WD/32XD; Draw | (Indonesia) Dionysius Hayom Rumbaka; 18–21, 21–15, 21–18 | (India) Prannoy H. S. |
| September 1 | Vietnam Open; Ho Chi Minh City, Vietnam; Grand Prix $50,000 – 64MS/32WS/32MD/32WD/32XD; Draw | (Japan) Nozomi Okuhara; 21–15, 21–11 | (Japan) Aya Ohori |
| September 1 | Vietnam Open; Ho Chi Minh City, Vietnam; Grand Prix $50,000 – 64MS/32WS/32MD/32WD/32XD; Draw | (Indonesia) Andrei Adistia (Indonesia) Hendra Aprida Gunawan; 15–21, 23–21, 21–17 | (Japan) Kenta Kazuno (Japan) Kazushi Yamada |
| September 1 | Vietnam Open; Ho Chi Minh City, Vietnam; Grand Prix $50,000 – 64MS/32WS/32MD/32WD/32XD; Draw | (Indonesia) Maretha Dea Giovani (Indonesia) Rosyita Eka Putri Sari; 21–19, 15–21, 21–10 | (Indonesia) Gebby Ristiyani Imawan (Indonesia) Ni Ketut Mahadewi Istarani |
| September 1 | Vietnam Open; Ho Chi Minh City, Vietnam; Grand Prix $50,000 – 64MS/32WS/32MD/32WD/32XD; Draw | (Indonesia) Muhammad Rijal (Indonesia) Vita Marissa; 21–18, 21–10 | (Indonesia) Irfan Fadhilah (Indonesia) Weni Anggraini |
| September 1 | Guatemala International; Guatemala City, Guatemala; International Challenge $15,000 – 64MS/32WS/32MD/16WD/32XD | (Spain) Pablo Abián; 4–11, 11–8, 11–5, 11–10 | (Guatemala) Kevin Cordón |
| September 1 | Guatemala International; Guatemala City, Guatemala; International Challenge $15,000 – 64MS/32WS/32MD/16WD/32XD | (Italy) Jeanine Cicognini; 11–2, 11–6, 3–11, 11–5 | (United States) Crystal Pan |
| September 1 | Guatemala International; Guatemala City, Guatemala; International Challenge $15,000 – 64MS/32WS/32MD/16WD/32XD | (France) Laurent Constantin (France) Matthieu Lo Ying Ping; 11–9, 11–7, 9–11, 9–11, 11–10 | (Guatemala) Rodolfo Ramírez (Guatemala) Jonathan Solís |
| September 1 | Guatemala International; Guatemala City, Guatemala; International Challenge $15,000 – 64MS/32WS/32MD/16WD/32XD | (United States) Eva Lee (United States) Paula Lynn Obañana; 11–2, 11–2, 11–10 | (Brazil) Paula Pereira (Brazil) Fabiana Silva |
| September 1 | Guatemala International; Guatemala City, Guatemala; International Challenge $15,000 – 64MS/32WS/32MD/16WD/32XD | (United States) Howard Shu (United States) Eva Lee; 10–11, 11–5, 11–10, 8–11, 11–5 | (United States) Phillip Chew (United States) Jamie Subandhi |
| September 1 | Kharkiv International; Kharkiv, Ukraine; International Challenge $15,000 – 32MS/32WS/16MD/16WD/32XD | (Denmark) Rasmus Fladberg; 11–7, 11–4, 11–9 | (Denmark) Joachim Persson |
| September 1 | Kharkiv International; Kharkiv, Ukraine; International Challenge $15,000 – 32MS/32WS/16MD/16WD/32XD | (Bulgaria) Linda Zetchiri; 10–11, 11–5, 3–11, 11–8, 11–5 | (Turkey) Özge Bayrak |
| September 1 | Kharkiv International; Kharkiv, Ukraine; International Challenge $15,000 – 32MS/32WS/16MD/16WD/32XD | (Ukraine) Gennadiy Natarov (Ukraine) Artem Pochtarev; 11–6, 11–8, 11–9 | (Ukraine) Vitaly Konov (Ukraine) Dmytro Zavadsky |
| September 1 | Kharkiv International; Kharkiv, Ukraine; International Challenge $15,000 – 32MS/32WS/16MD/16WD/32XD | (Ukraine) Natalya Voytsekh (Ukraine) Yelyzaveta Zharka; 11–8, 11–7, 6–11, 11–7 | (Ukraine) Yuliya Kazarinova (Ukraine) Mariya Rud |
| September 1 | Kharkiv International; Kharkiv, Ukraine; International Challenge $15,000 – 32MS/32WS/16MD/16WD/32XD | (Ukraine) Artem Pochtarev (Ukraine) Elena Prus; 10–11, 11–7, 11–10, 11–6 | (Ukraine) Valeriy Atrashchenkov (Ukraine) Yelyzaveta Zharka |
| September 8 | Indonesian Masters; Malang, East Java, Indonesia; Grand Prix Gold $120,000 – 64MS/32WS/32MD/32WD/32XD; Draw | (India) Prannoy H. S. 21–11, 22–20 | (Indonesia) Firman Abdul Kholik |
| September 8 | Indonesian Masters; Malang, East Java, Indonesia; Grand Prix Gold $120,000 – 64MS/32WS/32MD/32WD/32XD; Draw | (Indonesia) Adriyanti Firdasari; 21–14, 21–14 | (Indonesia) Ruselli Hartawan |
| September 8 | Indonesian Masters; Malang, East Java, Indonesia; Grand Prix Gold $120,000 – 64MS/32WS/32MD/32WD/32XD; Draw | (Indonesia) Marcus Fernaldi Gideon (Indonesia) Markis Kido; 21–17, 20–22, 21–14 | (Indonesia) Selvanus Geh (Indonesia) Kevin Sanjaya Sukamuljo |
| September 8 | Indonesian Masters; Malang, East Java, Indonesia; Grand Prix Gold $120,000 – 64MS/32WS/32MD/32WD/32XD; Draw | (Indonesia) Shendy Puspa Irawati (Indonesia) Vita Marissa; 23–21, 21–13 | (Indonesia) Keshya Nurvita Hanadia (Indonesia) Devi Tika Permatasari |
| September 8 | Indonesian Masters; Malang, East Java, Indonesia; Grand Prix Gold $120,000 – 64MS/32WS/32MD/32WD/32XD; Draw | (Indonesia) Riky Widianto (Indonesia) Richi Puspita Dili; 21–18, 21–19 | (Indonesia) Muhammad Rijal (Indonesia) Vita Marissa |
| September 8 | Belgian International; Leuven, Belgium; International Challenge $15,000 – 32MS/32WS/32MD/32WD/32XD | (Denmark) Hans-Kristian Vittinghus; 11–8, 10–11, 11–9, 11–9 | (Germany) Marc Zwiebler |
| September 8 | Belgian International; Leuven, Belgium; International Challenge $15,000 – 32MS/32WS/32MD/32WD/32XD | (Canada) Michelle Li; 11–6, 11–2, 11–6 | (Germany) Karin Schnaase |
| September 8 | Belgian International; Leuven, Belgium; International Challenge $15,000 – 32MS/32WS/32MD/32WD/32XD | (Denmark) Mathias Christiansen (Denmark) David Daugaard; 11–10, 6–11, 8–11, 11–7, 11–9 | (Netherlands) Jacco Arends (Netherlands) Jelle Maas |
| September 8 | Belgian International; Leuven, Belgium; International Challenge $15,000 – 32MS/32WS/32MD/32WD/32XD | (Netherlands) Eefje Muskens (Netherlands) Selena Piek; 11–9, 9–11, 11–8, 10–11, 11–7 | (Netherlands) Samantha Barning (Netherlands) Iris Tabeling |
| September 8 | Belgian International; Leuven, Belgium; International Challenge $15,000 – 32MS/32WS/32MD/32WD/32XD | (Netherlands) Jacco Arends (Netherlands) Selena Piek; 11–5, 11–10, 11–7 | (Netherlands) Jelle Maas (Netherlands) Iris Tabeling |
| September 15 | Polish International; Bieruń, Poland; International Series $10,000 – 32MS/32WS/32MD/32WD/32XD | (Poland) Michał Rogalski; 21–12, 21–18 | (Indonesia) Adi Pratama |
| September 15 | Polish International; Bieruń, Poland; International Series $10,000 – 32MS/32WS/32MD/32WD/32XD | (England) Panuga Riou; 11–9, 8–11, 11–6, 11–7 | (Turkey) Özge Bayrak |
| September 15 | Polish International; Bieruń, Poland; International Series $10,000 – 32MS/32WS/32MD/32WD/32XD | (Poland) Adam Cwalina (Poland) Przemysław Wacha; 11–8, 6–11, 11–5, 8–11, 9–11 | (Germany) Daniel Benz (Germany) Jones Ralfy Jansen |
| September 15 | Polish International; Bieruń, Poland; International Series $10,000 – 32MS/32WS/32MD/32WD/32XD | (Turkey) Cemre Fere (Turkey) Ebru Tunalı; 11–7, 4–11, 11–8, 11–6 | (England) Jenny Moore (England) Victoria Williams |
| September 15 | Polish International; Bieruń, Poland; International Series $10,000 – 32MS/32WS/32MD/32WD/32XD | (Poland) Robert Mateusiak (Poland) Agnieszka Wojtkowska; 11–9, 11–5, 11–7 | (Ukraine) Gennadiy Natarov (Ukraine) Yuliya Kazarinova |
| September 15 | Auckland International; Auckland, New Zealand; International Series $5,000 – 64MS/32WS/32MD/16WD/32XD | (Chinese Taipei) Lu Chia-hung; 11–9, 11–7, 11–4 | (Chinese Taipei) Kuo Po-cheng |
| September 15 | Auckland International; Auckland, New Zealand; International Series $5,000 – 64MS/32WS/32MD/16WD/32XD | (Chinese Taipei) Lee Chia-hsin; 8–11, 11–4, 11–8, 5–11, 11–5 | (Chinese Taipei) Chiang Mei-hui |
| September 15 | Auckland International; Auckland, New Zealand; International Series $5,000 – 64MS/32WS/32MD/16WD/32XD | (Chinese Taipei) Po Li-wei (Chinese Taipei) Yang Ming-tse; 8–11, 5–11, 11–8, 11–9, 11–6 | (Netherlands) Ruud Bosch (Chinese Taipei) Tien Tzu-chieh |
| September 15 | Auckland International; Auckland, New Zealand; International Series $5,000 – 64MS/32WS/32MD/16WD/32XD | (Chinese Taipei) Chang Ching-hui (Chinese Taipei) Chang Hsin-tien; 6–11, 11–8, 11–10, 11–9 | (Australia) Leanne Choo (Australia) Gronya Somerville |
| September 15 | Auckland International; Auckland, New Zealand; International Series $5,000 – 64MS/32WS/32MD/16WD/32XD | (Chinese Taipei) Lee Chia-han (Chinese Taipei) Lee Chia-hsin; 11–6, 11–6, 11–8 | (Netherlands) Ruud Bosch (Chinese Taipei) Shuai Pei-ling |
| September 15 | Asian Games; Incheon, South Korea; Multisports; 12 teams (M)/12 teams (W)/64MS/32WS/32MD/32WD/32XD; Draw | South Korea; 3–2 | China |
| September 15 | Asian Games; Incheon, South Korea; Multisports; 12 teams (M)/12 teams (W)/64MS/32WS/32MD/32WD/32XD; Draw | China; 3–0 | South Korea |
| September 15 | Asian Games; Incheon, South Korea; Multisports; 12 teams (M)/12 teams (W)/64MS/32WS/32MD/32WD/32XD; Draw | (China) Lin Dan; 12–21, 21–16, 21–16 | (China) Chen Long |
| September 15 | Asian Games; Incheon, South Korea; Multisports; 12 teams (M)/12 teams (W)/64MS/32WS/32MD/32WD/32XD; Draw | (China) Wang Yihan; 11–21, 21–17, 21–7 | (China) Li Xuerui |
| September 15 | Asian Games; Incheon, South Korea; Multisports; 12 teams (M)/12 teams (W)/64MS/32WS/32MD/32WD/32XD; Draw | (Indonesia) Mohammad Ahsan (Indonesia) Hendra Setiawan; 21–16, 16–21, 21–17 | (South Korea) Lee Yong-dae (South Korea) Yoo Yeon-seong |
| September 15 | Asian Games; Incheon, South Korea; Multisports; 12 teams (M)/12 teams (W)/64MS/32WS/32MD/32WD/32XD; Draw | (Indonesia) Nitya Krishinda Maheswari (Indonesia) Greysia Polii; 21–15, 21–9 | (Japan) Misaki Matsutomo (Japan) Ayaka Takahashi |
| September 15 | Asian Games; Incheon, South Korea; Multisports; 12 teams (M)/12 teams (W)/64MS/32WS/32MD/32WD/32XD; Draw | (China) Zhang Nan (China) Zhao Yunlei; 21–16, 21–14 | (Indonesia) Tontowi Ahmad (Indonesia) Liliyana Natsir |
| September 22 | Sydney International; Sydney, Australia; International Challenge $15,000 – 64MS/32WS/32MD/32WD/32XD | (Japan) Riichi Takeshita; 9–11, 11–7, 11–5, 11–4 | (China) Huang Guoxing |
| September 22 | Sydney International; Sydney, Australia; International Challenge $15,000 – 64MS/32WS/32MD/32WD/32XD | (Japan) Yuki Fukushima; 2–11, 11–6, 11–9, 11–9 | (Japan) Kana Ito |
| September 22 | Sydney International; Sydney, Australia; International Challenge $15,000 – 64MS/32WS/32MD/32WD/32XD | (China) Bao Zilong (China) Qi Shuangshuang; 11–6, 11–7, 11–2 | (United States) Phillip Chew (United States) Sattawat Pongnairat |
| September 22 | Sydney International; Sydney, Australia; International Challenge $15,000 – 64MS/32WS/32MD/32WD/32XD | (Japan) Yuki Fukushima (Japan) Sayaka Hirota; 11–5, 11–5, 11–2 | (Indonesia) Sylvina Kurniawan (Australia) Susan Wang |
| September 22 | Sydney International; Sydney, Australia; International Challenge $15,000 – 64MS/32WS/32MD/32WD/32XD | (Australia) Sawan Serasinghe (Australia) Setyana Mapasa; 11–4, 11–8, 11–2 | (Australia) Pham Tran Hoang (Indonesia) Sylvina Kurniawan |
| September 22 | Czech International; Prague, Czech Republic; International Challenge $15,000 – 32MS/32WS/32MD/32WD/32XD | (Germany) Marc Zwiebler; 21–13, 21–18 | (Denmark) Joachim Persson |
| September 22 | Czech International; Prague, Czech Republic; International Challenge $15,000 – 32MS/32WS/32MD/32WD/32XD | (Canada) Michelle Li; 21–14, 21–17 | (Ukraine) Marija Ulitina |
| September 22 | Czech International; Prague, Czech Republic; International Challenge $15,000 – 32MS/32WS/32MD/32WD/32XD | (Poland) Przemysław Wacha (Poland) Adam Cwalina; 21–15, 21–15 | (Poland) Łukasz Moreń (Poland) Wojciech Szkudlarczyk |
| September 22 | Czech International; Prague, Czech Republic; International Challenge $15,000 – 32MS/32WS/32MD/32WD/32XD | (Canada) Rachel Honderich (Canada) Michelle Li; 21–12, 21–17 | (Russia) Irina Khlebko (Russia) Elena Komendrovskaja |
| September 22 | Czech International; Prague, Czech Republic; International Challenge $15,000 – 32MS/32WS/32MD/32WD/32XD | (Sweden) Jonathan Nordh (Sweden) Emelie Fabbeke; 18–21, 21–19, 21–19 | (Russia) Anatoliy Yartsev (Russia) Evgenija Kosetskaya |
| September 22 | Colombia International; Medellín, Colombia; International Series $5,000 – 32MS/32WS/32MD/16WD/32XD | (Guatemala) Heymard Humblers; 11–9, 11–4, 11–2 | (Peru) Andrés Corpancho |
| September 22 | Colombia International; Medellín, Colombia; International Series $5,000 – 32MS/32WS/32MD/16WD/32XD | (Portugal) Telma Santos; 11–5, 11–6, 11–2 | (Peru) Daniela Macías |
| September 22 | Colombia International; Medellín, Colombia; International Series $5,000 – 32MS/32WS/32MD/16WD/32XD | (Guatemala) Heymard Humblers (Guatemala) Adams Rodriguez; 8–11, 11–10, 7–11, 11–6, 11–10 | (Dominican Republic) Nelson Javier (Dominican Republic) Alberto Raposo |
| September 22 | Colombia International; Medellín, Colombia; International Series $5,000 – 32MS/32WS/32MD/16WD/32XD | (Peru) Katherine Winder (Peru) Luz María Zornoza; 11–6, 11–10, 11–6 | (Peru) Daniela Macías (Peru) Dánica Nishimura |
| September 22 | Colombia International; Medellín, Colombia; International Series $5,000 – 32MS/32WS/32MD/16WD/32XD | (Peru) Andrés Corpancho (Peru) Luz María Zornoza; 11–10, 5–11, 11–7, 5–11, 11–10 | (Peru) Mario Cuba (Peru) Katherine Winder |
| September 29 | Vietnam International Series; Da Nang, Vietnam; International Series $5,000 – 64MS/32WS/32MD/32WD/32XD | (Malaysia) Lim Chi Wing; 21–19, 11–21, 21–17 | (Chinese Taipei) Lu Chia-hung |
| September 29 | Vietnam International Series; Da Nang, Vietnam; International Series $5,000 – 64MS/32WS/32MD/32WD/32XD | (Vietnam) Vũ Thị Trang; 21–23, 21–9, 21–8 | (Thailand) Supamart Mingchua |
| September 29 | Vietnam International Series; Da Nang, Vietnam; International Series $5,000 – 64MS/32WS/32MD/32WD/32XD | (Malaysia) Low Juan Shen (Malaysia) Ong Yew Sin; 21–19, 21–13 | (Malaysia) Jagdish Singh (Malaysia) Roni Tan Wee Long |
| September 29 | Vietnam International Series; Da Nang, Vietnam; International Series $5,000 – 64MS/32WS/32MD/32WD/32XD | (Vietnam) Vũ Thị Trang (Vietnam) Nguyễn Thị Sen; 22–20, 21–15 | (Vietnam) Đặng Kim Ngân (Vietnam) Lê Thị Thanh Thủy |
| September 29 | Vietnam International Series; Da Nang, Vietnam; International Series $5,000 – 64MS/32WS/32MD/32WD/32XD | (Vietnam) Đào Mạnh Thắng (Vietnam) Phạm Như Thảo; 21–14, 21–11 | (Malaysia) Tan Chee Tean (Malaysia) Shevon Jemie Lai |
| September 29 | Bulgarian International; Sofia, Bulgaria; International Challenge $15,000 – 32MS/32WS/32MD/32WD/32XD | (Germany) Marc Zwiebler; 21–15, 21–8 | (Republic of Ireland) Scott Evans |
| September 29 | Bulgarian International; Sofia, Bulgaria; International Challenge $15,000 – 32MS/32WS/32MD/32WD/32XD | (Spain) Beatriz Corrales; 23–25, 21–15, 21–12 | (Indonesia) Maria Febe Kusumastuti |
| September 29 | Bulgarian International; Sofia, Bulgaria; International Challenge $15,000 – 32MS/32WS/32MD/32WD/32XD | (Indonesia) Selvanus Geh (Indonesia) Kevin Sanjaya Sukamuljo; 21–9, 21–13 | (Indonesia) Ronald Alexander (Indonesia) Edi Subaktiar |
| September 29 | Bulgarian International; Sofia, Bulgaria; International Challenge $15,000 – 32MS/32WS/32MD/32WD/32XD | (Indonesia) Della Destiara Haris (Indonesia) Gebby Ristiyani Imawan; 21–9, 18–21, 21–18 | (Indonesia) Ririn Amelia (Indonesia) Komala Dewi |
| September 29 | Bulgarian International; Sofia, Bulgaria; International Challenge $15,000 – 32MS/32WS/32MD/32WD/32XD | (Indonesia) Fran Kurniawan (Indonesia) Komala Dewi; 18–21, 21–19, 21–13 | (Germany) Max Schwenger (Germany) Carla Nelte |

=== October ===
| Week of | Tournament | Champions | Runners-up |
|---|---|---|---|
| October 6 | Dutch Open; Almere, Netherlands; Grand Prix $50,000 – 64MS/32WS/32MD/32WD/32XD; Draw | (India) Ajay Jayaram; 10–11, 11–6, 11–7, 1–11, 11–9 | (Indonesia) Ihsan Maulana Mustofa |
| October 6 | Dutch Open; Almere, Netherlands; Grand Prix $50,000 – 64MS/32WS/32MD/32WD/32XD; Draw | (United States) Beiwen Zhang; 11–9, 11–7, 11–8 | (Chinese Taipei) Pai Yu-po |
| October 6 | Dutch Open; Almere, Netherlands; Grand Prix $50,000 – 64MS/32WS/32MD/32WD/32XD; Draw | (France) Baptiste Carême (France) Ronan Labar; 5–11, 11–10, 11–10, 11–7 | (Indonesia) Fran Kurniawan (Indonesia) Agripina Prima Rahmanto Putra |
| October 6 | Dutch Open; Almere, Netherlands; Grand Prix $50,000 – 64MS/32WS/32MD/32WD/32XD; Draw | (Netherlands) Eefje Muskens (Netherlands) Selena Piek; 11–8, 4–11, 11–9, 11–10 | (Indonesia) Shendy Puspa Irawati (Indonesia) Vita Marissa |
| October 6 | Dutch Open; Almere, Netherlands; Grand Prix $50,000 – 64MS/32WS/32MD/32WD/32XD; Draw | (Indonesia) Riky Widianto (Indonesia) Richi Puspita Dili; 11–10, 10–11, 9–11, 11–8, 11–1 | (Netherlands) Jorrit de Ruiter (Netherlands) Samantha Barning |
| October 13 | Pan Am Badminton Championships; Markham, Ontario, Canada; Continental Championships; 8 teams/64MS/32WS/32MD/16WD/32XD; Draw | Canada; 3–2 | United States |
| October 13 | Pan Am Badminton Championships; Markham, Ontario, Canada; Continental Championships; 8 teams/64MS/32WS/32MD/16WD/32XD; Draw | (Cuba) Osleni Guerrero; 19–21, 21–14, 21–13 | (United States) Bjorn Seguin |
| October 13 | Pan Am Badminton Championships; Markham, Ontario, Canada; Continental Championships; 8 teams/64MS/32WS/32MD/16WD/32XD; Draw | (Canada) Michelle Li; 21–13, 21–16 | (Canada) Rachel Honderich |
| October 13 | Pan Am Badminton Championships; Markham, Ontario, Canada; Continental Championships; 8 teams/64MS/32WS/32MD/16WD/32XD; Draw | (Canada) Adrian Liu (Canada) Derrick Ng; 21–15, 21–13 | (United States) Phillip Chew (United States) Sattawat Pongnairat |
| October 13 | Pan Am Badminton Championships; Markham, Ontario, Canada; Continental Championships; 8 teams/64MS/32WS/32MD/16WD/32XD; Draw | (United States) Eva Lee (United States) Paula Lynn Obañana; 23–21, 21–14 | (Brazil) Lohaynny Vicente (Brazil) Luana Vicente |
| October 13 | Pan Am Badminton Championships; Markham, Ontario, Canada; Continental Championships; 8 teams/64MS/32WS/32MD/16WD/32XD; Draw | (Canada) Toby Ng (Canada) Alex Bruce; 21–16, 19–21, 21–18 | (United States) Phillip Chew (United States) Jamie Subandhi |
| October 13 | Denmark Open; Odense, Denmark; Super Series Premier $600,000 – 32MS/32WS/32MD/32WD/32XD; Draw | (China) Chen Long; 21–19, 24–22 | (South Korea) Son Wan-ho |
| October 13 | Denmark Open; Odense, Denmark; Super Series Premier $600,000 – 32MS/32WS/32MD/32WD/32XD; Draw | (China) Li Xuerui; 21–17, 22–20 | (China) Wang Yihan |
| October 13 | Denmark Open; Odense, Denmark; Super Series Premier $600,000 – 32MS/32WS/32MD/32WD/32XD; Draw | (China) Fu Haifeng (China) Zhang Nan; 21–13, 25–23 | (South Korea) Lee Yong-dae (South Korea) Yoo Yeon-seong |
| October 13 | Denmark Open; Odense, Denmark; Super Series Premier $600,000 – 32MS/32WS/32MD/32WD/32XD; Draw | (China) Wang Xiaoli (China) Yu Yang; 21–14, 21–14 | (Japan) Misaki Matsutomo (Japan) Ayaka Takahashi |
| October 13 | Denmark Open; Odense, Denmark; Super Series Premier $600,000 – 32MS/32WS/32MD/32WD/32XD; Draw | (China) Xu Chen (China) Ma Jin; 22–20, 21–15 | (Indonesia) Tontowi Ahmad (Indonesia) Liliyana Natsir |
| October 13 | Swiss International; Yverdon-les-Bains, Switzerland; International Challenge $15,000 – 32MS/32WS/32MD/32WD/32XD | (Indonesia) Jonatan Christie; 9–11, 9–11, 11–6, 11–9, 11–10 | (Hong Kong) Ng Ka Long |
| October 13 | Swiss International; Yverdon-les-Bains, Switzerland; International Challenge $15,000 – 32MS/32WS/32MD/32WD/32XD | (Indonesia) Hanna Ramadini; 16–21, 21–16, 21–14 | (Indonesia) Dinar Dyah Ayustine |
| October 13 | Swiss International; Yverdon-les-Bains, Switzerland; International Challenge $15,000 – 32MS/32WS/32MD/32WD/32XD | (Philippines) Peter Gabriel Magnaye (Philippines) Paul Jefferson Vivas; 6–11, 11–9, 10–11, 11–6, 11–10 | (France) Baptiste Carême (France) Ronan Labar |
| October 13 | Swiss International; Yverdon-les-Bains, Switzerland; International Challenge $15,000 – 32MS/32WS/32MD/32WD/32XD | (Bulgaria) Gabriela Stoeva (Bulgaria) Stefani Stoeva; 11–6, 11–5, 11–9 | (Indonesia) Meiliana Jauhari (Indonesia) Aprilsasi Putri Lejarsar Variella |
| October 13 | Swiss International; Yverdon-les-Bains, Switzerland; International Challenge $15,000 – 32MS/32WS/32MD/32WD/32XD | (France) Ronan Labar (France) Émilie Lefel; 11–9, 11–7, 11–9 | (Russia) Vitalij Durkin (Russia) Nina Vislova |
| October 13 | Ethiopia International; Arat Kilo, Ethiopia; International Series $5,000 – 32MS/16WS/16MD/16WD/16XD | (Israel) Misha Zilberman; 11–7, 11–9, 11–6 | (Austria) Luka Wraber |
| October 13 | Ethiopia International; Arat Kilo, Ethiopia; International Series $5,000 – 32MS/16WS/16MD/16WD/16XD | (Nigeria) Grace Gabriel; 11–6, 11–7, 11–9 | (Egypt) Hadia Hosny |
| October 13 | Ethiopia International; Arat Kilo, Ethiopia; International Series $5,000 – 32MS/16WS/16MD/16WD/16XD | (Austria) Luka Wraber (Austria) Vilson Vattanirappel; 11–7, 11–2, 11–9 | (France) Arnaud Génin (Slovakia) Matej Hliničan |
| October 13 | Ethiopia International; Arat Kilo, Ethiopia; International Series $5,000 – 32MS/16WS/16MD/16WD/16XD | (Zambia) Ogar Siamupangila (Zambia) Evelyn Siamupangila; 11–2, 11–4, 11–5 | (Ethiopia) Yerusksew Tura (Ethiopia) Firehiwot Getachew |
| October 13 | Ethiopia International; Arat Kilo, Ethiopia; International Series $5,000 – 32MS/16WS/16MD/16WD/16XD | (Slovakia) Matej Hliničan (Uganda) Bridget Shamim Bangi; 11–4, 11–9, 11–5 | (Ethiopia) Asnake Getachew Sahilu (Ethiopia) Yerusksew Tura |
| October 20 | French Open; Paris, France; Super Series $275,000 – 32MS/32WS/32MD/32WD/32XD; Draw | (Chinese Taipei) Chou Tien-chen; 10–21, 25–23, 21–19 | (China) Wang Zhengming |
| October 20 | French Open; Paris, France; Super Series $275,000 – 32MS/32WS/32MD/32WD/32XD; Draw | (China) Wang Shixian; 21–15, 8–3 Retired | (China) Li Xuerui |
| October 20 | French Open; Paris, France; Super Series $275,000 – 32MS/32WS/32MD/32WD/32XD; Draw | (Denmark) Mathias Boe (Denmark) Carsten Mogensen; 18–21, 21–9, 21–7 | (Japan) Hiroyuki Endo (Japan) Kenichi Hayakawa |
| October 20 | French Open; Paris, France; Super Series $275,000 – 32MS/32WS/32MD/32WD/32XD; Draw | (China) Wang Xiaoli (China) Yu Yang; 21–15, 21–9 | (China) Ma Jin (China) Tang Yuanting |
| October 20 | French Open; Paris, France; Super Series $275,000 – 32MS/32WS/32MD/32WD/32XD; Draw | (Indonesia) Tontowi Ahmad (Indonesia) Liliyana Natsir; 21–9, 21–16 | (England) Chris Adcock (England) Gabby Adcock |
| October 20 | Hatzor International; Hatzor, Israel; International Series $5,000; 32MS/16WS/16MD/16XD | (Ukraine) Artem Pochtarov; 0-0 Retired | (Bulgaria) Blagovest Kisyov |
| October 20 | Hatzor International; Hatzor, Israel; International Series $5,000; 32MS/16WS/16MD/16XD | (Portugal) Telma Santos; 11–6, 11–6, 11–5 | (Croatia) Dorotea Sutara |
| October 20 | Hatzor International; Hatzor, Israel; International Series $5,000; 32MS/16WS/16MD/16XD | (Ukraine) Gennadiy Natarov (Ukraine) Artem Pochtarov; 11–5, 11–10, 11–10 | (Israel) Alexander Bass (Israel) Lior Kroyter |
| October 20 | Hatzor International; Hatzor, Israel; International Series $5,000; 32MS/16WS/16MD/16XD | (Ukraine) Gennadiy Natarov (Ukraine) Yuliya Kazarinova; 11–6, 11–7, 8–11, 11–10 | (France) Florent Riancho (Mauritius) Kate Foo Kune |
| October 20 | USA International; Orlando, Florida, United States; International Challenge $15,000 – 64MS/32WS/32MD/16WD/32XD | (Sweden) Henri Hurskainen; 21–16, 21–11 | (Sweden) Mattias Borg |
| October 20 | USA International; Orlando, Florida, United States; International Challenge $15,000 – 64MS/32WS/32MD/16WD/32XD | (Japan) Kaori Imabeppu; 21–19, 22–20 | (Japan) Sayaka Sato |
| October 20 | USA International; Orlando, Florida, United States; International Challenge $15,000 – 64MS/32WS/32MD/16WD/32XD | (Japan) Takuro Hoki (Japan) Yugo Kobayashi; 21–17, 21–19 | (Canada) Adrian Liu (Canada) Derrick Ng |
| October 20 | USA International; Orlando, Florida, United States; International Challenge $15,000 – 64MS/32WS/32MD/16WD/32XD | (Japan) Naoko Fukuman (Japan) Kurumi Yonao; 21–10, 25–23 | (United States) Eva Lee (United States) Paula Lynn Obañana |
| October 20 | USA International; Orlando, Florida, United States; International Challenge $15,000 – 64MS/32WS/32MD/16WD/32XD | (Canada) Toby Ng (Canada) Alex Bruce; 18–21, 25–23, 21–9 | (United States) Phillip Chew (United States) Jamie Subandhi |
| October 20 | Nigeria International; Abuja, Nigeria; International Series $10,000 – 32MS/32WS/16WD/16XD | (Uganda) Edwin Ekiring; 11–4, 11–7, 4–11, 11–9 | (France) Arnaud Génin |
| October 20 | Nigeria International; Abuja, Nigeria; International Series $10,000 – 32MS/32WS/16WD/16XD | (Switzerland) Nicole Schaller; 11–8, 11–2, 7–11, 10–11, 11–6 | (Nigeria) Grace Gabriel |
| October 20 | Nigeria International; Abuja, Nigeria; International Series $10,000 – 32MS/32WS/16WD/16XD | (Nigeria) Jinkan Ifraimu (Nigeria) Ola Fagbemi; 10–11, 11–5, 11–8, 11–9 | (Nigeria) Enejoh Abah (Nigeria) Victor Makanju |
| October 20 | Nigeria International; Abuja, Nigeria; International Series $10,000 – 32MS/32WS/16WD/16XD | (Uganda) Bridget Shamim Bangi (Egypt) Hadia Hosny; 11–5, 11–10, 11–10 | (Nigeria) Tosin Damilola Atolagbe (Nigeria) Fatima Azeez |
| October 20 | Nigeria International; Abuja, Nigeria; International Series $10,000 – 32MS/32WS/16WD/16XD | (Nigeria) Jinkan Ifraimu (Nigeria) Susan Ideh; 8–11, 11–4, 7–11, 11–10, 11–8 | (Nigeria) Ola Fagbemi (Nigeria) Dorcas Ajoke Adesokan |
| October 27 | Bitburger Open; Saarbrücken, Germany; Grand Prix Gold $120,000 – 64MS/32WS/32MD/32WD/32XD; Draw | (Chinese Taipei) Chou Tien-chen; 21–17, 21–10 | (Republic of Ireland) Scott Evans |
| October 27 | Bitburger Open; Saarbrücken, Germany; Grand Prix Gold $120,000 – 64MS/32WS/32MD/32WD/32XD; Draw | (China) Sun Yu; 16–21, 21–15, 21–12 | (China) He Bingjiao |
| October 27 | Bitburger Open; Saarbrücken, Germany; Grand Prix Gold $120,000 – 64MS/32WS/32MD/32WD/32XD; Draw | (China) Wang Yilyu (China) Zhang Wen; 21–14, 21–10 | (Denmark) Kim Astrup (Denmark) Anders Skaarup Rasmussen |
| October 27 | Bitburger Open; Saarbrücken, Germany; Grand Prix Gold $120,000 – 64MS/32WS/32MD/32WD/32XD; Draw | (China) Ou Dongni (China) Yu Xiaohan; 21–10, 21–18 | (Russia) Ekaterina Bolotova (Russia) Evgeniya Kosetskaya |
| October 27 | Bitburger Open; Saarbrücken, Germany; Grand Prix Gold $120,000 – 64MS/32WS/32MD/32WD/32XD; Draw | (China) Zheng Siwei (China) Chen Qingchen; 21–11, 21–13 | (Indonesia) Alfian Eko Prasetya (Indonesia) Annisa Saufika |
| October 27 | Brazil International; São Paulo, Brazil; International Challenge $15,000 – 32MS/32WS/32MD/32WD/32XD | (Sweden) Henri Hurskainen; 11–6, 11–7, 11–6 | (Cuba) Osleni Guerrero |
| October 27 | Brazil International; São Paulo, Brazil; International Challenge $15,000 – 32MS/32WS/32MD/32WD/32XD | (United States) Iris Wang; 11–5, 11–9, 11–7 | (Brazil) Lohaynny Vicente |
| October 27 | Brazil International; São Paulo, Brazil; International Challenge $15,000 – 32MS/32WS/32MD/32WD/32XD | (France) Bastian Kersaudy (France) Gaëtan Mittelheisser; 11–9, 9–11, 11–7, 11–5 | (France) Matthieu Lo Ying Ping (France) Laurent Constantin |
| October 27 | Brazil International; São Paulo, Brazil; International Challenge $15,000 – 32MS/32WS/32MD/32WD/32XD | (Canada) Alex Bruce (Canada) Phyllis Chan; 11–10, 10–11, 11–8, 11–5 | (Canada) Nicole Grether (Canada) Charmaine Reid |
| October 27 | Brazil International; São Paulo, Brazil; International Challenge $15,000 – 32MS/32WS/32MD/32WD/32XD | (France) Laurent Constantin (France) Laura Choinet; 11–10, 5–11, 11–10, 11–7 | (France) Gaëtan Mittelheisser (France) Audrey Fontaine |
| October 27 | Hungarian International; Budapest, Hungary; International Series $5,000 – 32MS/32WS/32MD/32WD/32XD | (Denmark) Kasper Dinesen; 9–11, 11–9, 11–2, 11–4 | (Croatia) Zvonimir Đurkinjak |
| October 27 | Hungarian International; Budapest, Hungary; International Series $5,000 – 32MS/32WS/32MD/32WD/32XD | (England) Fontaine Mica Chapman; 11–2, 11–10, 11–9 | (Denmark) Sandra-Maria Jensen |
| October 27 | Hungarian International; Budapest, Hungary; International Series $5,000 – 32MS/32WS/32MD/32WD/32XD | (Croatia) Zvonimir Đurkinjak (Croatia) Zvonimir Hölbling; 10–11, 11–9, 10–11, 11–4, 11–5 | (Denmark) Andreas Berthelsen (Denmark) Kasper Dinesen |
| October 27 | Hungarian International; Budapest, Hungary; International Series $5,000 – 32MS/32WS/32MD/32WD/32XD | (Malaysia) Cheah Yee See (Malaysia) Goh Yea Ching; 11–4, 11–10, 11–10 | (Denmark) Josephine van Zaane (Sweden) Emma Wengberg |
| October 27 | Hungarian International; Budapest, Hungary; International Series $5,000 – 32MS/32WS/32MD/32WD/32XD | (England) Ben Lane (England) Jessica Pugh; 11–4, 11–10, 11–7 | (Czech Republic) Jakub Bitman (Czech Republic) Alžběta Bášová |

=== November ===
| Week of | Tournament | Champions | Runners-up |
|---|---|---|---|
| November 3 | Bahrain International Challenge; Isa Town, Bahrain; International Challenge $15,000 – 64MS/32WS/32MD/8WD/32XD | (Indonesia) Firman Abdul Kholik; 20–22, 21–13, 21–13 | (India) Anand Pawar |
| November 3 | Bahrain International Challenge; Isa Town, Bahrain; International Challenge $15,000 – 64MS/32WS/32MD/8WD/32XD | (India) P. C. Thulasi; 18–21, 23–21, 21–15 | (Indonesia) Ruselli Hartawan |
| November 3 | Bahrain International Challenge; Isa Town, Bahrain; International Challenge $15,000 – 64MS/32WS/32MD/8WD/32XD | (Indonesia) Afiat Yuris Wirawan (Indonesia) Yohanes Rendy Sugiarto; 23–21, 21–15 | (Indonesia) Fran Kurniawan (Indonesia) Agripinna Prima Rahmanto Putra |
| November 3 | Bahrain International Challenge; Isa Town, Bahrain; International Challenge $15,000 – 64MS/32WS/32MD/8WD/32XD | (Russia) Ekaterina Bolotova (Russia) Evgeniya Kosetskaya; 21–6, 21–15 | (Russia) Anastasia Chervyakova (Russia) Nina Vislova |
| November 3 | Bahrain International Challenge; Isa Town, Bahrain; International Challenge $15,000 – 64MS/32WS/32MD/8WD/32XD | (Russia) Vitalij Durkin (Russia) Nina Vislova; 21–8, 21–10 | (Indonesia) Fran Kurniawan (Indonesia) Komala Dewi |
| November 3 | Korea Masters; Jeonju, South Korea; Grand Prix $50,000 – 64MS/32WS/32MD/32WD/32XD; Draw | (South Korea) Lee Dong-keun; 21–18, 24–22 | (South Korea) Lee Hyun-il |
| November 3 | Korea Masters; Jeonju, South Korea; Grand Prix $50,000 – 64MS/32WS/32MD/32WD/32XD; Draw | (Japan) Nozomi Okuhara; 21–17, 21–13 | (Japan) Sayaka Sato |
| November 3 | Korea Masters; Jeonju, South Korea; Grand Prix $50,000 – 64MS/32WS/32MD/32WD/32XD; Draw | (South Korea) Lee Yong-dae (South Korea) Yoo Yeon-seong; 21–18, 21–19 | (South Korea) Ko Sung-hyun (South Korea) Shin Baek-cheol |
| November 3 | Korea Masters; Jeonju, South Korea; Grand Prix $50,000 – 64MS/32WS/32MD/32WD/32XD; Draw | (South Korea) Lee So-hee (South Korea) Shin Seung-chan; 15–8 Retired | (South Korea) Chang Ye-na (South Korea) Yoo Hae-won |
| November 3 | Korea Masters; Jeonju, South Korea; Grand Prix $50,000 – 64MS/32WS/32MD/32WD/32XD; Draw | (South Korea) Choi Sol-gyu (South Korea) Shin Seung-chan; Walkover | (South Korea) Shin Baek-cheol (South Korea) Chang Ye-na |
| November 3 | Internacional Mexicano; Tijuana, Mexico; International Series $5,000 – 32MS/32WS/32MD/32WD/32XD | (Mexico) Luis Ramon Garrido; 21–18, 19–21, 21–14 | (Mexico) Lino Muñoz |
| November 3 | Internacional Mexicano; Tijuana, Mexico; International Series $5,000 – 32MS/32WS/32MD/32WD/32XD | (Mexico) Haramara Gaitan; 21–11, 21–11 | (Mexico) Cynthia Gonzalez |
| November 3 | Internacional Mexicano; Tijuana, Mexico; International Series $5,000 – 32MS/32WS/32MD/32WD/32XD | (Mexico) Job Castillo (Mexico) Antonio Ocegueda; 21–14, 21–15 | (Mexico) Arturo Hernandez (Mexico) Lino Muñoz |
| November 3 | Internacional Mexicano; Tijuana, Mexico; International Series $5,000 – 32MS/32WS/32MD/32WD/32XD | (Mexico) Cynthia Gonzalez (Mexico) Mariana Ugalde; 21–17, 11–21, 22–20 | (Mexico) Haramara Gaitan (Mexico) Sabrina Solis |
| November 3 | Internacional Mexicano; Tijuana, Mexico; International Series $5,000 – 32MS/32WS/32MD/32WD/32XD | (Mexico) Lino Muñoz (Mexico) Cynthia Gonzalez; 16–21, 21–16, 21–13 | (Mexico) Job Castillo (Mexico) Sabrina Solis |
| November 3 | Morocco International; Casablanca, Morocco; International Series $5,000 – 32MS/16WS/16MD/16WD/16XD | (Portugal) Pedro Martins; 11–8, 11–10, 11–10 | (Belgium) Yuhan Tan |
| November 3 | Morocco International; Casablanca, Morocco; International Series $5,000 – 32MS/16WS/16MD/16WD/16XD | (Belgium) Lianne Tan; 7–11, 11–9, 11–9, 11–8 | (Mauritius) Kate Foo Kune |
| November 3 | Morocco International; Casablanca, Morocco; International Series $5,000 – 32MS/16WS/16MD/16WD/16XD | (Turkey) Sinan Zorlu (Turkey) Yusuf Ramazan Bay; 11–10, 11–6, 11–8 | (Algeria) Adel Hamek (Algeria) Mohamed Abdelrahim Belrabi |
| November 3 | Morocco International; Casablanca, Morocco; International Series $5,000 – 32MS/16WS/16MD/16WD/16XD | (Turkey) Kader Inal (Turkey) Fatma Nur Yavuz; 11–8, 11–7, 9–11, 11–9 | (Turkey) Cemre Fere (Turkey) Ebru Tunali |
| November 3 | Morocco International; Casablanca, Morocco; International Series $5,000 – 32MS/16WS/16MD/16WD/16XD | (Turkey) Melih Turgut (Turkey) Fatma Nur Yavuz; 10–11, 11–8, 11–9, 11–2 | (Jordan) Bahaedeen Ahmad Al-shannik (Jordan) Domou Amro |
| November 10 | China Open; Fuzhou, China; Super Series Premier $700,000 – 32MS/32WS/32MD/32WD/32XD; Draw | (India) Srikanth Kidambi; 21–19, 21–17 | (China) Lin Dan |
| November 10 | China Open; Fuzhou, China; Super Series Premier $700,000 – 32MS/32WS/32MD/32WD/32XD; Draw | (India) Saina Nehwal; 21–12, 22–20 | (Japan) Akane Yamaguchi |
| November 10 | China Open; Fuzhou, China; Super Series Premier $700,000 – 32MS/32WS/32MD/32WD/32XD; Draw | (South Korea) Lee Yong-dae (South Korea) Yoo Yeon-seong; 21–14, 21–15 | (China) Chai Biao (China) Hong Wei |
| November 10 | China Open; Fuzhou, China; Super Series Premier $700,000 – 32MS/32WS/32MD/32WD/32XD; Draw | (China) Wang Xiaoli (China) Yu Yang; 21–16, 19–21, 22–20 | (China) Tian Qing (China) Zhao Yunlei |
| November 10 | China Open; Fuzhou, China; Super Series Premier $700,000 – 32MS/32WS/32MD/32WD/32XD; Draw | (China) Zhang Nan (China) Zhao Yunlei; 23–25, 21–14, 21–18 | (South Korea) Yoo Yeon-seong (South Korea) Eom Hye-won |
| November 10 | Malaysia International; Kuching, Sarawak, Malaysia; International Challenge $15,000 – 64MS/32WS/32MD/32WD/32XD | (South Korea) Lee Hyun-il; 17–21, 21–16, 21–11 | (Malaysia) Tan Chun Seang |
| November 10 | Malaysia International; Kuching, Sarawak, Malaysia; International Challenge $15,000 – 64MS/32WS/32MD/32WD/32XD | (Singapore) Chen Jiayuan; 21–11, 21–13 | (Indonesia) Gregoria Mariska Tunjung |
| November 10 | Malaysia International; Kuching, Sarawak, Malaysia; International Challenge $15,000 – 64MS/32WS/32MD/32WD/32XD | (Chinese Taipei) Lin Chia-yu (Chinese Taipei) Wu Hsiao-lin; 21–12, 10–21, 22–20 | (Malaysia) Chow Pak Chuu (Malaysia) Mak Hee Chun |
| November 10 | Malaysia International; Kuching, Sarawak, Malaysia; International Challenge $15,000 – 64MS/32WS/32MD/32WD/32XD | (Japan) Ayane Kurihara (Japan) Naru Shinoya; 21–14, 21–17 | (Indonesia) Maretha Dea Giovani (Indonesia) Rosyita Eka Putri Sari |
| November 10 | Malaysia International; Kuching, Sarawak, Malaysia; International Challenge $15,000 – 64MS/32WS/32MD/32WD/32XD | (Indonesia) Hafiz Faisal (Indonesia) Shella Devi Aulia; 19–21, 21–19, 21–18 | (Singapore) Terry Hee Yong Kai (Singapore) Tan Wei Han |
| November 10 | Suriname International; Paramaribo, Suriname; International Series $5,000 – 32MS/16WS/16MD/8WD/16XD | (Cuba) Osleni Guerrero; 21–7 Retired | (Czech Republic) Jan Frohlich |
| November 10 | Suriname International; Paramaribo, Suriname; International Series $5,000 – 32MS/16WS/16MD/8WD/16XD | (Peru) Daniela Macias; 21–16, 21–12 | (Peru) Danica Nishimura |
| November 10 | Suriname International; Paramaribo, Suriname; International Series $5,000 – 32MS/16WS/16MD/8WD/16XD | (Peru) Mario Cuba (Peru) Martin del Valle; 21–11, 21–14 | (Suriname) Gilmar Jones (Suriname) Mitchel Wongsodikromo |
| November 10 | Suriname International; Paramaribo, Suriname; International Series $5,000 – 32MS/16WS/16MD/8WD/16XD | (Peru) Katherine Winder (Peru) Luz Maria Zornoza; 21–13, 21–14 | (Peru) Daniela Macias (Peru) Danica Nishimura |
| November 10 | Suriname International; Paramaribo, Suriname; International Series $5,000 – 32MS/16WS/16MD/8WD/16XD | (Peru) Mario Cuba (Peru) Katherine Winder; 21–12, 21–8 | (Peru) Andres Corpancho (Peru) Luz Maria Zornoza |
| November 10 | Norwegian International; Sandefjord, Norway; International Series $5,000 – 32MS/32WS/32MD/32WD/32XD | (Estonia) Raul Must; 21–16, 21–14 | (Denmark) Soeren Toft Hansen |
| November 10 | Norwegian International; Sandefjord, Norway; International Series $5,000 – 32MS/32WS/32MD/32WD/32XD | (Denmark) Mia Blichfeldt; 21–18, 21–17 | (Lithuania) Akvile Stapusaityte |
| November 10 | Norwegian International; Sandefjord, Norway; International Series $5,000 – 32MS/32WS/32MD/32WD/32XD | (Finland) Anton Kaisti (Netherlands) Koen Ridder; 21–13, 21–14 | (Poland) Milosz Bochat (Poland) Maciej Dabrowski |
| November 10 | Norwegian International; Sandefjord, Norway; International Series $5,000 – 32MS/32WS/32MD/32WD/32XD | (Denmark) Tilde Iversen (Sweden) Emma Wengberg; 21–13, 21–15 | (Poland) Magdalena Witek (Poland) Aneta Wojtkowska |
| November 10 | Norwegian International; Sandefjord, Norway; International Series $5,000 – 32MS/32WS/32MD/32WD/32XD | (Finland) Anton Kaisti (Netherlands) Cheryl Seinen; 21–15, 17–21, 21–14 | (Sweden) Filip Michael Duwall Myhren (Sweden) Emma Wengberg |
| November 17 | Hong Kong Open; Kowloon, Hong Kong; Super Series $275,000 – 32MS/32WS/32MD/32WD/32XD; Draw | (South Korea) Son Wan-ho; 21–19, 21–16 | (China) Chen Long |
| November 17 | Hong Kong Open; Kowloon, Hong Kong; Super Series $275,000 – 32MS/32WS/32MD/32WD/32XD; Draw | (Chinese Taipei) Tai Tzu-ying; 21–19, 21–11 | (Japan) Nozomi Okuhara |
| November 17 | Hong Kong Open; Kowloon, Hong Kong; Super Series $275,000 – 32MS/32WS/32MD/32WD/32XD; Draw | (Indonesia) Mohammad Ahsan (Indonesia) Hendra Setiawan; 21–16, 17–21, 21–15 | (China) Liu Xiaolong (China) Qiu Zihan |
| November 17 | Hong Kong Open; Kowloon, Hong Kong; Super Series $275,000 – 32MS/32WS/32MD/32WD/32XD; Draw | (China) Tian Qing (China) Zhao Yunlei; 21–13, 21–13 | (Japan) Misaki Matsutomo (Japan) Ayaka Takahashi |
| November 17 | Hong Kong Open; Kowloon, Hong Kong; Super Series $275,000 – 32MS/32WS/32MD/32WD/32XD; Draw | (China) Zhang Nan (China) Zhao Yunlei; 21–14, 21–19 | (China) Xu Chen (China) Ma Jin |
| November 17 | Scottish Open; Glasgow, Scotland; Grand Prix $50,000 – 64MS/32WS/32MD/32WD/32XD; Draw | (Finland) Ville Lang; 17–21, 22–20, 21–16 | (Chinese Taipei) Wang Tzu-wei |
| November 17 | Scottish Open; Glasgow, Scotland; Grand Prix $50,000 – 64MS/32WS/32MD/32WD/32XD; Draw | (Japan) Sayaka Sato; 21–18, 21–9 | (Spain) Beatriz Corrales |
| November 17 | Scottish Open; Glasgow, Scotland; Grand Prix $50,000 – 64MS/32WS/32MD/32WD/32XD; Draw | (Denmark) Mathias Christiansen (Denmark) David Daugaard; 21–13, 21–17 | (Germany) Raphael Beck (Germany) Andreas Heinz |
| November 17 | Scottish Open; Glasgow, Scotland; Grand Prix $50,000 – 64MS/32WS/32MD/32WD/32XD; Draw | (Bulgaria) Gabriela Stoeva (Bulgaria) Stefani Stoeva; 21–7, 21–15 | (England) Heather Olver (England) Lauren Smith |
| November 17 | Scottish Open; Glasgow, Scotland; Grand Prix $50,000 – 64MS/32WS/32MD/32WD/32XD; Draw | (Scotland) Robert Blair (Scotland) Imogen Bankier; 21–18, 21–14 | (Denmark) Niclas Nohr (Denmark) Sara Thygesen |
| November 17 | Finnish International; Helsinki, Finland; International Series $5,470 – 32MS/32WS/32MD/32WD/32XD | (Finland) Eetu Heino; 21–14, 21–17 | (Finland) Kasper Lehikoinen |
| November 17 | Finnish International; Helsinki, Finland; International Series $5,470 – 32MS/32WS/32MD/32WD/32XD | (Russia) Olga Golovanova; 21–12, 21–12 | (Russia) Victoria Slobodjanuk |
| November 17 | Finnish International; Helsinki, Finland; International Series $5,470 – 32MS/32WS/32MD/32WD/32XD | (Denmark) Mathias Bay-Smidt (Denmark) Frederik Søgaard Mortensen; 25–23, 15–21, 21–17 | (Denmark) Kasper Antonsen (Denmark) Oliver Babic |
| November 17 | Finnish International; Helsinki, Finland; International Series $5,470 – 32MS/32WS/32MD/32WD/32XD | (Russia) Victoria Dergunova (Russia) Olga Morozova; 21–11, 21–15 | (Russia) Irina Khlebko (Russia) Elena Komendrovskaja |
| November 17 | Finnish International; Helsinki, Finland; International Series $5,470 – 32MS/32WS/32MD/32WD/32XD | (Germany) Jones Rafli Jansen (Germany) Cisita Joity Jansen; 15–21, 21–17, 21–16 | (Russia) Alexandr Zinchenko (Russia) Olga Morozova |
| November 24 | Macau Open; Macau; Grand Prix Gold $120,000 – 64MS/32WS/32MD/32WD/32XD; Draw | (China) Xue Song; 16–21, 21–13, 21–19 | (Hong Kong) Wong Wing Ki |
| November 24 | Macau Open; Macau; Grand Prix Gold $120,000 – 64MS/32WS/32MD/32WD/32XD; Draw | (India) Pusarla Venkata Sindhu; 21–12, 21–17 | (South Korea) Kim Hyo-min |
| November 24 | Macau Open; Macau; Grand Prix Gold $120,000 – 64MS/32WS/32MD/32WD/32XD; Draw | (Singapore) Danny Bawa Chrisnanta (Singapore) Chayut Triyachart; 21–19, 22–20 | (Indonesia) Angga Pratama (Indonesia) Ricky Karanda Suwardi |
| November 24 | Macau Open; Macau; Grand Prix Gold $120,000 – 64MS/32WS/32MD/32WD/32XD; Draw | (China) Ou Dongni (China) Yu Xiaohan; 19–21, 21–19, 21–7 | (China) Huang Yaqiong (China) Zhong Qianxin |
| November 24 | Macau Open; Macau; Grand Prix Gold $120,000 – 64MS/32WS/32MD/32WD/32XD; Draw | (Indonesia) Edi Subaktiar (Indonesia) Gloria Emanuelle Widjaja; 21–15, 29–30, 22–20 | (Singapore) Danny Bawa Chrisnanta (Singapore) Vanessa Neo Yu Yan |
| November 24 | Welsh International; Cardiff, Wales; International Challenge $15,000 – 32MS/32WS/32MD/32WD/32XD | (Scotland) Kieran Merrilees; 21–15, 21–10 | (England) Toby Penty |
| November 24 | Welsh International; Cardiff, Wales; International Challenge $15,000 – 32MS/32WS/32MD/32WD/32XD | (Spain) Beatriz Corrales; 10–21, 21–13, 21–13 | (Bulgaria) Linda Zetchiri |
| November 24 | Welsh International; Cardiff, Wales; International Challenge $15,000 – 32MS/32WS/32MD/32WD/32XD | (England) Matthew Nottingham (England) Harley Towler; 21–15, 21–13 | (Scotland) Adam Hall (Scotland) Gordon Thomson |
| November 24 | Welsh International; Cardiff, Wales; International Challenge $15,000 – 32MS/32WS/32MD/32WD/32XD | (England) Heather Olver (England) Lauren Smith; 21–11, 21–17 | (England) Sophie Brown (England) Kate Robertshaw |
| November 24 | Welsh International; Cardiff, Wales; International Challenge $15,000 – 32MS/32WS/32MD/32WD/32XD | (England) Christopher Coles (England) Sophie Brown; 18–21, 21–16, 21–14 | (Germany) Max Weisskirchen (Germany) Eva Janssens |
| November 24 | Zambia International; Lusaka, Zambia; International Series $5,000 – 32MS/32WS/16MD/16WD/16XD | (Uganda) Edwin Ekiring; 21–18, 21–8 | (Slovenia) Alen Roj |
| November 24 | Zambia International; Lusaka, Zambia; International Series $5,000 – 32MS/32WS/16MD/16WD/16XD | (Mauritius) Kate Foo Kune; 21–16, 21–17 | (Nigeria) Grace Gabriel |
| November 24 | Zambia International; Lusaka, Zambia; International Series $5,000 – 32MS/32WS/16MD/16WD/16XD | (Italy) Giovanni Greco (Italy) Rosario Maddaloni; 21–14, 21–16 | (South Africa) Andries Malan (South Africa) Willem Viljoen |
| November 24 | Zambia International; Lusaka, Zambia; International Series $5,000 – 32MS/32WS/16MD/16WD/16XD | (South Africa) Michelle Butler-Emmett (South Africa) Elme de Villiers; 21–17, 19–21, 21–17 | (Nigeria) Grace Gabriel (Mauritius) Kate Foo Kune |
| November 24 | Zambia International; Lusaka, Zambia; International Series $5,000 – 32MS/32WS/16MD/16WD/16XD | (Mauritius) Georges Julien Paul (Mauritius) Kate Foo Kune; 21–18, 21–14 | (Egypt) Ali Ahmed El-Khateeb (Egypt) Doha Hany |

=== December ===
| Week of | Tournament | Champions | Runners-up |
|---|---|---|---|
| December 1 | Bangladesh International; Dhaka, Bangladesh; International Challenge $15,000 – 64MS/32WS/16MD/16WD/16XD | (Malaysia) Lim Chi Wing; 21–12, 21–17 | (India) Subhankar Dey |
| December 1 | Bangladesh International; Dhaka, Bangladesh; International Challenge $15,000 – 64MS/32WS/16MD/16WD/16XD | (Turkey) Neslihan Yiğit; 21–18, 21–12 | (Malaysia) Yap Rui Chen |
| December 1 | Bangladesh International; Dhaka, Bangladesh; International Challenge $15,000 – 64MS/32WS/16MD/16WD/16XD | (Malaysia) Low Juan Shen (Malaysia) Ong Yew Sin; 19–21, 21–8, 21–13 | (Malaysia) Darren Isaac Devadass (Malaysia) Tan Wee Gieen |
| December 1 | Bangladesh International; Dhaka, Bangladesh; International Challenge $15,000 – 64MS/32WS/16MD/16WD/16XD | (India) Pradnya Gadre (India) N. Sikki Reddy; 21–10, 22–24, 21–16 | (Turkey) Özge Bayrak (Turkey) Neslihan Yiğit |
| December 1 | Bangladesh International; Dhaka, Bangladesh; International Challenge $15,000 – 64MS/32WS/16MD/16WD/16XD | (Malaysia) Tan Chee Tean (Malaysia) Shevon Jemie Lai; 21–17, 21–18 | (Malaysia) Tan Wee Gieen (Malaysia) Peck Yen Wei |
| December 1 | Irish Open; Dublin, Ireland; International Challenge $15,000 – 32MS/32WS/32MD/32WD/32XD | (Hong Kong) Ng Ka Long; 21–18, 21–13 | (Chinese Taipei) Wang Tzu-wei |
| December 1 | Irish Open; Dublin, Ireland; International Challenge $15,000 – 32MS/32WS/32MD/32WD/32XD | (Spain) Beatriz Corrales; 23–21, 21–13 | (Denmark) Line Kjærsfeldt |
| December 1 | Irish Open; Dublin, Ireland; International Challenge $15,000 – 32MS/32WS/32MD/32WD/32XD | (Poland) Adam Cwalina (Poland) Przemysław Wacha; 12–21, 21–10, 21–18 | (Germany) Max Schwenger (Germany) Josche Zurwonne |
| December 1 | Irish Open; Dublin, Ireland; International Challenge $15,000 – 32MS/32WS/32MD/32WD/32XD | (Sweden) Emelie Fabbeke (Denmark) Lena Grebak; 21–16, 21–14 | (Denmark) Julie Finne-Ipsen (Denmark) Rikke Søby Hansen |
| December 1 | Irish Open; Dublin, Ireland; International Challenge $15,000 – 32MS/32WS/32MD/32WD/32XD | (Denmark) Niclas Nøhr (Denmark) Sara Thygesen; 21–10, 21–18 | (Germany) Peter Käsbauer (Germany) Isabel Herttrich |
| December 1 | Santo Domingo Open; Santo Domingo, Dominican Republic; International Series $5,000 – 32MS/16WS/8MD/8WD/16XD | (Austria) David Obernosterer; 21–16, 16–21, 21–17 | (Cuba) Osleni Guerrero |
| December 1 | Santo Domingo Open; Santo Domingo, Dominican Republic; International Series $5,000 – 32MS/16WS/8MD/8WD/16XD | (Austria) Elisabeth Baldauf; 21–7, 21–9 | (Peru) Dánica Nishimura |
| December 1 | Santo Domingo Open; Santo Domingo, Dominican Republic; International Series $5,000 – 32MS/16WS/8MD/8WD/16XD | (Dominican Republic) Nelson Javier (Dominican Republic) Alberto Raposo; 21–18, 24–26, 21–17 | (Dominican Republic) William Cabrera (Dominican Republic) Reimi Starling Cabrera |
| December 1 | Santo Domingo Open; Santo Domingo, Dominican Republic; International Series $5,000 – 32MS/16WS/8MD/8WD/16XD | (Peru) Daniela Macías (Peru) Dánica Nishimura; 14–21, 21–18, 21–16 | (Dominican Republic) Berónica Vibieca (Dominican Republic) Daigenis Saturria |
| December 1 | Santo Domingo Open; Santo Domingo, Dominican Republic; International Series $5,000 – 32MS/16WS/8MD/8WD/16XD | (Austria) David Obernosterer (Austria) Elisabeth Baldauf; 21–17, 21–15 | (Dominican Republic) Nelson Javier (Dominican Republic) Berónica Vibieca |
| December 1 | South Africa International; Cape Town, South Africa; International Challenge $10,000 – 32MS/32WS/32MD/16WD/32XD | (Austria) Luka Wraber; 16–21, 21–17, 21–15 | (Uganda) Edwin Ekiring |
| December 1 | South Africa International; Cape Town, South Africa; International Challenge $10,000 – 32MS/32WS/32MD/16WD/32XD | (Turkey) Cemre Fere; 21–13, 8–2 Retired | (Belgium) Marie Demy |
| December 1 | South Africa International; Cape Town, South Africa; International Challenge $10,000 – 32MS/32WS/32MD/16WD/32XD | (Iran) Farzin Khanjani (Iran) Mohamad Reza Khanjani; 21–15, 21–11 | (Austria) Luka Wraber (Slovenia) Alen Roj |
| December 1 | South Africa International; Cape Town, South Africa; International Challenge $10,000 – 32MS/32WS/32MD/16WD/32XD | (Turkey) Cemre Fere (Turkey) Ebru Tunalı; 14–21, 21–11, 21–10 | (Turkey) Kader İnal (Turkey) Ebru Yazgan |
| December 1 | South Africa International; Cape Town, South Africa; International Challenge $10,000 – 32MS/32WS/32MD/16WD/32XD | (South Africa) Cameron Coetzer (South Africa) Michelle Butler-Emmett; 25–23, 19–21, 21–15 | (South Africa) Prakash Vijayanath (South Africa) Stacey Doubell |
| December 8 | U.S. Grand Prix; Orange County, California, United States; Grand Prix $50,000 – 64MS/32WS/32MD/32WD/32XD; Draw | (Chinese Taipei) Hsu Jen-hao; 21–19, 19–21, 21–8 | (Czech Republic) Petr Koukal |
| December 8 | U.S. Grand Prix; Orange County, California, United States; Grand Prix $50,000 – 64MS/32WS/32MD/32WD/32XD; Draw | (United States) Beiwen Zhang; 21–11, 21–13 | (Canada) Rachael Honderich |
| December 8 | U.S. Grand Prix; Orange County, California, United States; Grand Prix $50,000 – 64MS/32WS/32MD/32WD/32XD; Draw | (Poland) Adam Cwalina (Poland) Przemysław Wacha; 21–13, 21–6 | (Japan) Taiki Shimada (Japan) Yoshinori Takeuchi |
| December 8 | U.S. Grand Prix; Orange County, California, United States; Grand Prix $50,000 – 64MS/32WS/32MD/32WD/32XD; Draw | (Chinese Taipei) Hsieh Pei-chen (Chinese Taipei) Wu Ti-jung; 21–16, 21–10 | (United States) Eva Lee (United States) Paula Lynn Obañana |
| December 8 | U.S. Grand Prix; Orange County, California, United States; Grand Prix $50,000 – 64MS/32WS/32MD/32WD/32XD; Draw | (Germany) Peter Käsbauer (Germany) Isabel Herttrich; 21–12, 21–14 | (United States) Howard Shu (United States) Eva Lee |
| December 8 | Italian International; Rome, Italy; International Challenge $15,000 – 32MS/32WS/32MD/32WD/32XD; Draw | (Indonesia) Andre Kurniawan Tedjono; 15–21, 21–18, 21–18 | (Italy) Indra Bagus Ade Chandra |
| December 8 | Italian International; Rome, Italy; International Challenge $15,000 – 32MS/32WS/32MD/32WD/32XD; Draw | (France) Sashina Vignes Waran; 16–21, 21–17, 21–17 | (Spain) Beatriz Corrales |
| December 8 | Italian International; Rome, Italy; International Challenge $15,000 – 32MS/32WS/32MD/32WD/32XD; Draw | (England) Marcus Ellis (England) Chris Langridge; 21–11 21–19 | (Germany) Michael Fuchs (Germany) Johannes Schöttler |
| December 8 | Italian International; Rome, Italy; International Challenge $15,000 – 32MS/32WS/32MD/32WD/32XD; Draw | (Netherlands) Samantha Barning (Netherlands) Iris Tabeling; 21–17, 21–15 | (Russia) Victoria Dergunova (Russia) Olga Morozova |
| December 8 | Italian International; Rome, Italy; International Challenge $15,000 – 32MS/32WS/32MD/32WD/32XD; Draw | (France) Ronan Labar (France) Émilie Lefel; 21–15, 21–14 | (France) Gaëtan Mittelheisser (France) Audrey Fontaine |
| December 8 | Tata Open India International Challenge; Mumbai, India; International Challenge $15,000 – 32MS/32WS/32MD/32WD/32XD; Draw | (India) Prannoy H. S. 21–16, 20–22, 21–17 | (India) R. M. V. Gurusaidutt |
| December 8 | Tata Open India International Challenge; Mumbai, India; International Challenge $15,000 – 32MS/32WS/32MD/32WD/32XD; Draw | (India) Gadde Ruthvika Shivani; 19–21, 21–18, 21–14 | (India) Arundhati Pantawane |
| December 8 | Tata Open India International Challenge; Mumbai, India; International Challenge $15,000 – 32MS/32WS/32MD/32WD/32XD; Draw | (India) Manu Attri (India) B. Sumeeth Reddy; 21–15, 21–15 | (India) Ramchandran Shlok (India) Sanyam Shukla |
| December 8 | Tata Open India International Challenge; Mumbai, India; International Challenge $15,000 – 32MS/32WS/32MD/32WD/32XD; Draw | (India) Aparna Balan (India) Prajakta Sawant; 21–13, 10–21, 21–13 | (India) Meghana Jakkampudi (India) K. Maneesha |
| December 8 | Tata Open India International Challenge; Mumbai, India; International Challenge $15,000 – 32MS/32WS/32MD/32WD/32XD; Draw | (India) Manu Attri (India) N. Sikki Reddy; 21–19, 19–21, 21–10 | (India) Akshay Dewalkar (India) Pradnya Gadre |
| December 8 | Botswana International; Lobatse, Botswana; International Series $5,000 – 32MS/32WS/32MD/16WD/32XD; Draw | (Austria) Luka Wraber; 21–5, 21–8 | (Slovenia) Alen Roj |
| December 8 | Botswana International; Lobatse, Botswana; International Series $5,000 – 32MS/32WS/32MD/16WD/32XD; Draw | (Nigeria) Grace Gabriel; 21–15, 21–13 | (Egypt) Hadia Hosny |
| December 8 | Botswana International; Lobatse, Botswana; International Series $5,000 – 32MS/32WS/32MD/16WD/32XD; Draw | (South Africa) Andries Malan (South Africa) Willem Viljoen; 14–21, 21–10, 21–19 | (Austria) Luka Wraber (Slovenia) Alen Roj |
| December 8 | Botswana International; Lobatse, Botswana; International Series $5,000 – 32MS/32WS/32MD/16WD/32XD; Draw | (South Africa) Elme de Villiers (Nigeria) Grace Gabriel; 21–17, 18–21, 21–18 | (Uganda) Bridget Shamim Bangi (Zambia) Ogar Siamupangila |
| December 8 | Botswana International; Lobatse, Botswana; International Series $5,000 – 32MS/32WS/32MD/16WD/32XD; Draw | (South Africa) Willem Viljoen (South Africa) Annari Viljoen; 21–14, 21–15 | (Slovakia) Matej Hliničan (Uganda) Shamim Bangi |
| December 15 | BWF World Super Series Finals; Dubai, UAE; BWF Super Series Finals $1,000,000 – 8MS (RR)/8WS (RR)/8MD (RR)/8WD (RR)/8XD (RR); Draw | (China) Chen Long; 21–16, 21–10 | (Denmark) Hans-Kristian Vittinghus |
| December 15 | BWF World Super Series Finals; Dubai, UAE; BWF Super Series Finals $1,000,000 – 8MS (RR)/8WS (RR)/8MD (RR)/8WD (RR)/8XD (RR); Draw | (Chinese Taipei) Tai Tzu-ying; 21–17, 21–12 | (South Korea) Sung Ji-hyun |
| December 15 | BWF World Super Series Finals; Dubai, UAE; BWF Super Series Finals $1,000,000 – 8MS (RR)/8WS (RR)/8MD (RR)/8WD (RR)/8XD (RR); Draw | (South Korea) Lee Yong-dae (South Korea) Yoo Yeon-seong; 19–21, 21–19, 21–16 | (China) Chai Biao (China) Hong Wei |
| December 15 | BWF World Super Series Finals; Dubai, UAE; BWF Super Series Finals $1,000,000 – 8MS (RR)/8WS (RR)/8MD (RR)/8WD (RR)/8XD (RR); Draw | (Japan) Misaki Matsutomo (Japan) Ayaka Takahashi; 21–17, 21–14 | (China) Tian Qing (China) Zhao Yunlei |
| December 15 | BWF World Super Series Finals; Dubai, UAE; BWF Super Series Finals $1,000,000 – 8MS (RR)/8WS (RR)/8MD (RR)/8WD (RR)/8XD (RR); Draw | (China) Zhang Nan (China) Zhao Yunlei; 21–15, 21–12 | (China) Liu Cheng (China) Bao Yixin |
| December 15 | Puerto Rico International; San Juan, Puerto Rico; International Series $5,000 – 32MS/32WS/8MD/4WD/8XD | (Brazil) Ygor Coelho; 21–16, 21–19 | (United States) Howard Shu |
| December 15 | Puerto Rico International; San Juan, Puerto Rico; International Series $5,000 – 32MS/32WS/8MD/4WD/8XD | (Brazil) Fabiana Silva; 21–6, 21–7 | (Puerto Rico) Génesis Valentín |
| December 15 | Puerto Rico International; San Juan, Puerto Rico; International Series $5,000 – 32MS/32WS/8MD/4WD/8XD | (Italy) Giovanni Greco (Italy) Rosario Maddaloni; 21–13, 21–12 | (United States) Matthew Fogarty (United States) Bjorn Seguin |
| December 15 | Puerto Rico International; San Juan, Puerto Rico; International Series $5,000 – 32MS/32WS/8MD/4WD/8XD | (Brazil) Ana Paula Campos (Brazil) Fabiana Silva; 21–18, 21–17 | (Peru) Camilla García (Peru) Luz María Zornoza |
| December 15 | Puerto Rico International; San Juan, Puerto Rico; International Series $5,000 – 32MS/32WS/8MD/4WD/8XD | (Peru) Andrés Corpancho (Peru) Luz María Zornoza; 21–19, 21–16 | (Dominican Republic) Nelson Javier (Dominican Republic) Berónica Vibieca |
| December 15 | Turkey International; Mersin, Turkey; International Challenge $15,000 – 32MS/32WS/32MD/32WD/32XD; Draw | (Austria) Matthias Almer; 21–15, 7–21, 21–17 | (Netherlands) Nick Fransman |
| December 15 | Turkey International; Mersin, Turkey; International Challenge $15,000 – 32MS/32WS/32MD/32WD/32XD; Draw | (Turkey) Neslihan Yiğit; 13–21, 21–14, 21–16 | (Turkey) Özge Bayrak |
| December 15 | Turkey International; Mersin, Turkey; International Challenge $15,000 – 32MS/32WS/32MD/32WD/32XD; Draw | (Russia) Konstantin Abramov (Russia) Alexandr Zinchenko; 21–17, 21–15 | (Thailand) Karnphop Atthaviroj (Hungary) Gergely Krausz |
| December 15 | Turkey International; Mersin, Turkey; International Challenge $15,000 – 32MS/32WS/32MD/32WD/32XD; Draw | (Bulgaria) Gabriela Stoeva (Bulgaria) Stefani Stoeva; 21–11, 21–9 | (Turkey) Özge Bayrak (Turkey) Neslihan Yiğit |
| December 15 | Turkey International; Mersin, Turkey; International Challenge $15,000 – 32MS/32WS/32MD/32WD/32XD; Draw | (Germany) Jones Ralfy Jansen (Germany) Cisita Joity Jansen; 17–21, 21–17, 21–12 | (Indonesia) Marcus Fernaldi Gideon (Bulgaria) Gabriela Stoeva |
