= 2012 South American Badminton Championships =

Tournament details
- Dates: 12–16 November
- Edition: 7th
- Venue: Villa Deportiva Club Regatas Lima
- Location: Lima, Peru

The 2012 South American Badminton Championships (Spanish: Campeonato Sudamericano Adulto de Badminton 2012) was a badminton tournament sanctioned by the South American Badminton Confederation and Badminton Pan America. The individual and mixed team events were held from 12 to 16 November 2012.

The tournament was held at Villa Deportiva Club Regatas Lima located in Lima, Peru. Three countries took part in the tournament.

The team event was played in a round-robin format. Brazil finished in first place with two wins. Peru finished as runners-up with one win while Chile finished in third place.

== Medal summary ==
=== Medalists ===
Event	Gold	Silver	Bronze
Men's singles	(Brazil) Daniel Paiola	(Brazil) Luíz dos Santos	(Peru) Mario Cuba
Men's singles	(Brazil) Daniel Paiola	(Brazil) Luíz dos Santos	(Peru) Bruno Monteverde
Women's singles	(Brazil) Fabiana Silva	(Brazil) Yasmin Cury	(Peru) Camila Duany
Women's singles	(Brazil) Fabiana Silva	(Brazil) Yasmin Cury	(Peru) Daniela Macías
Men's doubles	(Peru) Mario Cuba (Peru) Bruno Monteverde	(Brazil) Daniel Paiola (Brazil) Alex Tjong	(Chile) Iván León (Chile) Bastián Lizama
Men's doubles	(Peru) Mario Cuba (Peru) Bruno Monteverde	(Brazil) Daniel Paiola (Brazil) Alex Tjong	(Brazil) Pedro Chen (Brazil) Gabriel Gandara
Women's doubles	(Brazil) Paula Pereira (Brazil) Fabiana Silva	(Peru) Alejandra Monteverde (Peru) Luz María Zornoza	(Peru) Camilla García (Peru) Daniela Zapata
Women's doubles	(Brazil) Paula Pereira (Brazil) Fabiana Silva	(Peru) Alejandra Monteverde (Peru) Luz María Zornoza	(Chile) Chou Ting Ting (Chile) Camila Macaya
Mixed doubles	(Brazil) Daniel Paiola (Brazil) Fabiana Silva	(Peru) Mario Cuba (Peru) Luz María Zornoza	(Peru) Bruno Monteverde (Peru) Daniela Macías
Mixed doubles	(Brazil) Daniel Paiola (Brazil) Fabiana Silva	(Peru) Mario Cuba (Peru) Luz María Zornoza	(Chile) Cristián Araya (Chile) Camila Macaya
Mixed team	Brazil; Daniel Paiola; Aleksander Silva; Luíz dos Santos; Alex Tjong; Yasmin Cury; Paula Pereira; Fabiana Silva; Lohaynny Vicente	Peru; Mario Cuba; Sebastian Macías; Bruno Monteverde; Daniel la Torre Regal; Camilla García; Daniela Macías; Alejandra Monteverde; Daniela Zapata; Luz María Zornoza	Chile; Cristián Araya; Iván León; Bastián Lizama; Esteban Mujica; Chou Ting Ting; Camila Macaya; Mixhool Peña; Victoria Pérez

=== Medal table ===
* Host nation (Peru)

Rank	Nation	Gold	Silver	Bronze	Total
1	Brazil	5	3	1	9
2	Peru*	1	3	6	10
3	Chile	0	0	4	4
Totals (3 entries)		6	6	11	23

== Team event ==
=== Round robin ===
Pos	Team	Pld	W	L	MF	MA	MD	GF	GA	GD	PF	PA	PD	Pts	Qualification
1	Brazil	2	2	0	8	0	+8	16	1	+15	360	221	+139	2	Champions
2	Peru (H)	2	1	1	5	3	+2	11	6	+5	321	268	+53	1	Runners-up
3	Chile	2	0	2	0	10	−10	0	20	−20	228	420	−192	0	Third place

Source: TS
(H) Host

Brazil
5
Villa Deportiva Club Regatas Lima, Court 1
12 November 2022, 09:00 UTC−5

Chile
0

			1	2	3
1	(Brazil) (Chile)	Daniel Paiola / Fabiana Silva; Cristián Araya / Camila Macaya	21; 9	21; 11
2	(Brazil) (Chile)	Yasmin Cury; Chou Ting Ting	21; 17	21; 18
3	(Brazil) (Chile)	Alex Tjong; Iván León	21; 4	21; 9
4	(Brazil) (Chile)	Paula Pereira / Lohaynny Vicente; Chou Ting Ting / Camila Macaya	21; 8	21; 7
5	(Brazil) (Chile)	Daniel Paiola / Alex Tjong; Cristián Araya / Esteban Mujica	21; 11	21; 16

Peru
5
Villa Deportiva Club Regatas Lima, Court 1
12 November 2022, 13:30 UTC−5

Chile
0

			1	2	3
1	(Peru) (Chile)	Mario Cuba / Luz María Zornoza; Esteban Mujica / Camila Macaya	21; 5	21; 13
2	(Peru) (Chile)	Daniela Macías; Chou Ting Ting	21; 11	21; 5
3	(Peru) (Chile)	Mario Cuba; Cristián Araya	21; 9	21; 14
4	(Peru) (Chile)	Alejandra Monteverde / Luz María Zornoza; Chou Ting Ting / Camila Macaya	21; 15	21; 11
5	(Peru) (Chile)	Sebastian Macías / Bruno Monteverde; Cristián Araya / Esteban Mujica	21; 17	21; 18

Brazil
3
Villa Deportiva Club Regatas Lima, Court 1
12 November 2022, 18:00 UTC−5

Peru
0

			1	2	3
1	(Brazil) (Peru)	Daniel Paiola / Fabiana Silva; Mario Cuba / Luz María Zornoza	21; 18	26; 24
2	(Brazil) (Peru)	Daniel Paiola; Bruno Monteverde	19; 21	21; 8	21; 8
3	(Brazil) (Peru)	Fabiana Silva; Daniela Macías	21; 14	21; 18
4	(Brazil) (Peru)	Daniel Paiola / Alex Tjong; Mario Cuba / Bruno Monteverde				not played
5	(Brazil) (Peru)	Paula Pereira / Lohaynny Vicente; Alejandra Monteverde / Luz María Zornoza				not played
