= 2013 South American Badminton Championships =

Tournament details
- Dates: 9–13 December
- Edition: 8th
- Venue: Campo de Deportes Ñielol
- Location: Temuco, Chile

The 2013 South American Badminton Championships (Spanish: Campeonato Sudamericano Adulto de Badminton 2013) was a badminton tournament sanctioned by the South American Badminton Confederation and Badminton Pan America. The individual and mixed team events were held from 9 to 13 December 2013.

The tournament was held at Campo de Deportes Ñielol located in Temuco, Chile. Five countries took part in the tournament.

The team event was played in a round-robin format. Peru regained the title after winning all of their ties in the event. Hosts Chile finished as runners-up while Argentina achieved third place.

== Medal summary ==
=== Medalists ===
Event	Gold	Silver	Bronze
Men's singles	(Peru) Andrés Corpancho	(Chile) Cristián Araya	(Chile) Iván León
Men's singles	(Peru) Andrés Corpancho	(Chile) Cristián Araya	(Argentina) Pablo Macagno
Women's singles	(Peru) Camila Duany	(Peru) Camilla García	(Peru) Daniela Macías
Women's singles	(Peru) Camila Duany	(Peru) Camilla García	(Chile) Chou Ting Ting
Men's doubles	(Peru) Andrés Corpancho (Peru) Sebastian Macías	(Brazil) Pedro Chan (Brazil) Gabriel Gandara	(Chile) Iván León (Chile) Esteban Mujica
Men's doubles	(Peru) Andrés Corpancho (Peru) Sebastian Macías	(Brazil) Pedro Chan (Brazil) Gabriel Gandara	(Argentina) Tomás Thouyaret (Argentina) Martín Trejo
Women's doubles	(Peru) Katherine Winder (Peru) Luz María Zornoza	(Chile) Chou Ting Ting (Chile) Camila Macaya	(Chile) Tamara Pérez (Chile) Victoria Pérez
Women's doubles	(Peru) Katherine Winder (Peru) Luz María Zornoza	(Chile) Chou Ting Ting (Chile) Camila Macaya	(Colombia) Ángela Hormiga (Colombia) Liceth Sanchez
Mixed doubles	(Peru) Andrés Corpancho (Peru) Daniela Macías	(Chile) Esteban Mujica (Chile) Chou Ting Ting	(Peru) Sebastian Macías (Peru) Luz María Zornoza
Mixed doubles	(Peru) Andrés Corpancho (Peru) Daniela Macías	(Chile) Esteban Mujica (Chile) Chou Ting Ting	(Peru) José Guevara (Peru) Camilla García
Mixed team	Peru; Andrés Corpancho; José Guevara; Sebastian Macías; Kenshin Shimabukuro; Camila Duany; Camilla García; Katherine Winder; Daniela Macías; Luz María Zornoza	Chile; Cristián Araya; José Bastías; Iván León; Bastián Lizama; Esteban Mujica; Chou Ting Ting; Camila Macaya; Sara Megé; Tamara Pérez; Victoria Pérez	Argentina; Federico Díaz; Javier Macagno; Pablo Macagno; Tomás Thouyaret; Martín Trejo; Tomas Winocur; Florencia Bernatene; Bárbara María Berruezo; Daiana Garmendia

=== Medal table ===
* Host nation (Chile)

Rank	Nation	Gold	Silver	Bronze	Total
1	Peru	6	1	3	10
2	Chile*	0	4	4	8
3	Brazil	0	1	0	1
4	Argentina	0	0	3	3
5	Colombia	0	0	1	1
Totals (5 entries)		6	6	11	23

== Team event ==
=== Round robin ===
Pos	Team	Pld	W	L	MF	MA	MD	GF	GA	GD	PF	PA	PD	Pts	Qualification
1	Peru	3	3	0	14	1	+13	25	2	+23	558	300	+258	3	Champions
2	Chile (H)	3	2	1	10	5	+5	16	12	+4	491	458	+33	2	Runners-up
3	Argentina	3	1	2	6	9	−3	8	19	−11	371	507	−136	1	Third place
4	Colombia	3	0	3	0	15	−15	1	17	−16	222	377	−155	0	Fourth place

Source: TS
(H) Host

Chile
4
Campo de Deportes Ñielol, Court 1
9 December 2013, 09:30 UTC−3

Argentina
1

			1	2	3
1	(Chile) (Argentina)	Cristián Araya; Federico Díaz	21; 17	21; 17
2	(Chile) (Argentina)	Camila Macaya; Daiana Garmendia	21; 13	21; 14
3	(Chile) (Argentina)	Iván León / Esteban Mujica; Pablo Macagno / Tomás Thouyaret	18; 21	21; 16	15; 21
4	(Chile) (Argentina)	Chou Ting Ting / Camila Macaya; Bárbara María Berruezo / Daiana Garmendia	21; 4	21; 7
5	(Chile) (Argentina)	Esteban Mujica / Chou Ting Ting; Federico Díaz / Bárbara María Berruezo	21; 11	21; 5

Peru
5
Campo de Deportes Ñielol, Court 2
9 December 2013, 09:30 UTC−3

Colombia
0

			1	2	3
1	(Peru) (Colombia)	Kenshin Shimabukuro; Sebastian Andrade	21; 11	21; 5
2	(Peru) (Colombia)	Camila Duany; Liceth Sanchez	0; 0			retired
3	(Peru) (Colombia)	José Guevara / Sebastian Macías; Sebastian Andrade / Fabian Moreno	21; 10	21; 17
4	(Peru) (Colombia)	Camilla García / Luz María Zornoza; Ángela Hormiga / Liceth Sanchez	0; 0			retired
5	(Peru) (Colombia)	Kenshin Shimabukuro / Katherine Winder; Fabian Moreno / Ángela Hormiga	21; 16	21; 8

Peru
5
Campo de Deportes Ñielol, Court 1
9 December 2013, 15:30 UTC−3

Argentina
0

			1	2	3
1	(Peru) (Argentina)	José Guevara / Sebastian Macías; Javier Macagno / Tomas Winocur	21; 13	21; 9
2	(Peru) (Argentina)	Daniela Macías; Bárbara María Berruezo	21; 4	21; 4
3	(Peru) (Argentina)	Andrés Corpancho; Martín Trejo	21; 10	21; 6
4	(Peru) (Argentina)	Camilla García / Luz María Zornoza; Bárbara María Berruezo / Daiana Garmendia	21; 7	21; 11
5	(Peru) (Argentina)	Sebastian Macías / Luz María Zornoza; Federico Díaz / Daiana Garmendia	21; 18	21; 7

Chile
5
Campo de Deportes Ñielol, Court 2
9 December 2013, 15:30 UTC−3

Colombia
0

			1	2	3
1	(Chile) (Colombia)	José Bastías; Sebastian Andrade	20; 22	21; 12		retired
2	(Chile) (Colombia)	Tamara Pérez; Liceth Sanchez	21; 13	21; 19
3	(Chile) (Colombia)	Cristián Araya / Bastián Lizama; Sebastian Andrade / Fabian Moreno	0; 0			retired
4	(Chile) (Colombia)	Chou Ting Ting / Camila Macaya; Ángela Hormiga / Liceth Sanchez				w/o
5	(Chile) (Colombia)	Iván León / Camila Macaya; Fabian Moreno / Ángela Hormiga	21; 8	21; 6

Peru
4
Campo de Deportes Ñielol, Court 1
10 December 2013, 10:00 UTC−3

Chile
1

			1	2	3
1	(Peru) (Chile)	Andrés Corpancho; Iván León	21; 5	21; 16
2	(Peru) (Chile)	Daniela Macías; Chou Ting Ting	21; 10	21; 6
3	(Peru) (Chile)	Andrés Corpancho / Sebastian Macías; Cristián Araya / Esteban Mujica	22; 20	21; 17
4	(Peru) (Chile)	Katherine Winder / Luz María Zornoza; Ángela Hormiga / Liceth Sanchez	21; 8	21; 11
5	(Peru) (Chile)	Sebastian Macías / Luz María Zornoza; Cristián Araya / Camila Macaya	17; 21	21; 9	15; 21

Argentina
5
Campo de Deportes Ñielol, Court 2
10 December 2013, 10:00 UTC−3

Colombia
0

			1	2	3
1	(Argentina) (Colombia)	Pablo Macagno; Fabian Moreno	21; 6	21; 13
2	(Argentina) (Colombia)	Florencia Bernatene; Ángela Hormiga	21; 12	21; 17
3	(Argentina) (Colombia)	Tomás Thouyaret / Bárbara María Berruezo; Fabian Moreno / Ángela Hormiga	21; 14	21; 13
4	(Argentina) (Colombia)	Florencia Bernatene / Daiana Garmendia; Ángela Hormiga / Liceth Sanchez				w/o
5	(Argentina) (Colombia)	Tomás Thouyaret / Martín Trejo; Sebastian Andrade / Fabian Moreno				w/o
