= Badminton at the 2010 South American Games – Women's singles =

The Women's Singles event at the 2010 South American Games was held over March 21–24.

== Medalists ==
Gold	Silver	Bronze
Claudia Rivero; Peru	Cristina Aicardi; Peru	Yasmin Cury; Brazil; Paula Pereira; Brazil

== Draw ==
=== Finals ===
Semifinals
1	Claudia Rivero (PER)	21	21
3/4	Yasmin Cury (BRA)	6	7
Paula Pereira (BRA)	16	21	16
2	Cristina Aicardi (PER)	21	17	21

Final
1	Claudia Rivero (PER)	21	21
2	Cristina Aicardi (PER)	18	19

=== Top half ===
First Round
Daiana Garmendia (ARG)	9	4
Ting Ting Hu (CHI)	21	21

Second Round
1	Claudia Rivero (PER)	21	21
Laura Melissa Navarro (COL)	11	10
Celina Juarez (ARG)	14	7
Fabiana Silva (BRA)	21	21
3/4	Yasmin Cury (BRA)	21	23
Denisse Anabel Santana (ECU)	17	5
Crystal Leefmans (SUR)	23	15
Ting Ting Hu (CHI)	25	21

Quarterfinals
1	Claudia Rivero (PER)	21	21
Faniana Silva (BRA)	15	17
3/4	Yasmin Cury (BRA)	21	21
Ting Ting Hu (CHI)	17	15

Semifinals
1	Claudia Rivero (PER)	21	21
3/4	Yasmin Cury (BRA)	6	7

==== Bottom half ====
First Round
Lizeth Giovanna Tellez (COL)	17	14
Edith Josefa Capote (ECU)	21	21

Second Round
Edith Josefa Capote (ECU)	12	RET
Paula Pereira (BRA)	21	0
Lorena Castro (ARG)	18	6
3/4	Katherine Cochella (PER)	21	21
Natalia Norambuena (CHI)	21	21
Quennie Pawirosemito (SUR)	4	13
Maria Fernanda Briceno (COL)	14	7
2	Cristina Aicardi (PER)	21	21

Quarterfinals
Paula Pereira (BRA)	22	21
3/4	Katherine Cochella (PER)	20	16
Natalia Norambuena (CHI)	16	12
2	Cristina Aicardi (PER)	21	21

Semifinals
Paula Pereira (BRA)	16	21	16
2	Cristina Aicardi (PER)	21	17	21
