= Brazilian National Badminton Championships =

Badminton in Brazil

Brazilian National Badminton Championships are held since the year 1991. In the year 1994 there was an international participation in the championships. International championships of Brazil are held since 1984.

== Past winners ==
No.	Year	Men's singles	Women's singles	Men's doubles	Women's doubles	Mixed doubles
I	1991	Leandro Santos	Hao Min Huai	Leandro Santos; Wang Chi Fong	Hao Min Huai; Waldette Wahba	Paulo Fam; Sandra Miashiro
II	1992	Paulo Fam	Sandra Miashiro	Paulo Fam; Wang Chi Fong	Hao Min Huai; Sandra Miashiro	Paulo Fam; Sandra Miashiro
III	1993	Paulo Fam	Patrícia Finardi	Agnaldo Chang; Leandro Santos	Patrícia Finardi; Kao Mei I	Leandro Santos; Patrícia Finardi
IV	1994	Rasmus Tharsgaard	Ximena Bellido	Federico Valdez; Gustavo Salazar	Ursula Blanco; Ximena Bellido	Federico Valdez; Ximena Bellido
V	1995	Leandro Santos	M. Cristina Nakano	Leandro Santos; Marcelo Martins	M. Cristina Nakano; Iara Hamaoka	Leandro Santos; Fernanda Kumasaka
VI	1996	Ricardo Trevelin	Patrícia Finardi	Leandro Santos; Marcelo Martins	Hao Min Huai; Sandra Miashiro	Paulo Scala; Sandra Miashiro
VII	1997	Guilherme Pardo	Lais Ahnert	Guilherme Kumasaka; Paulo Scala	Hao Min Huai; Sandra M. Cattaneo	Huang Shuan; Hao Min Huai
VIII	1998	Guilherme Pardo	Fernanda Kumasaka	Guilherme Kumasaka; Leandro Santos	Fernanda Kumasaka; Lais Ahnert	Leandro Santos; Fernanda Kumasaka
IX	1999	Ricardo Trevelin	M. Cristina Nakano	Guilherme Pardo; Ricardo Trevelin	M. Cristina Nakano; Fernanda Kumasaka	Leandro Santos; Fernanda Kumasaka
X	2000	Guilherme Pardo	Fernanda Kumasaka	Guilherme Pardo; Ricardo Trevelin	Hao Min Huai; Sandra Cattaneo	Ricardo Trevelin; Hao Min Huai
XII	2005					
XIII	2006	Paulo von Scala	Renata Faustino	Lucas Araújo; Paulo von Scala	Paula Pereira; Thayse Cruz	Hugo Arthuso; Lay Ann Lie
XIV	2007	Guilherme Pardo	Fabiana Silva	Lucas Araújo; Paulo von Scala	Paula Pereira; Paula Villela	Luis Martín; Thayse Cruz
XV	2008	Yasmin Cury	Guilherme Pardo	Guilherme Pardo; Guilherme Kumasaka	Fabiana Silva; Paula Pereira	Lucas Araújo; Roberta Angi
XVI	2009	Luis Cereda	Fabiana Silva	Lucas Araújo; Luis Martín	Fabiana Silva; Paula Pereira	Lucas Araújo; Roberta Angi
XVII	2010	Luis Cereda	Fabiana Silva	Guilherme Kumasaka; Hugo Arthuso	Fabiana Silva; Marina Eliezer	Luis Cereda; Marina Eliezer
XVIII	2011	Aleksander Silva	Paula Pereira	Guilherme Kumasaka; Marcelo Tsuchida	Claudia Low; Thayse Cruz	Aleksander Silva; Renata Faustino
XIX	2012	Alex Tjong	Fabiana Silva	Leonardo Alkimin; Hugo Arthuso	Paula Pereira; Fabiana Silva	Alex Tjong; Paula Pereira
XX	2013	Gabriel Gandara	Mariana Pedrol Freitas	Pedro Chen; Gabriel Gandara	Emanuelly Rocha Farias; Andreza Miranda Santos	Thomas Moretti; Mariana Pedrol Freitas
XXI	2014	Daniel Paiola	Fabiana Silva	Daniel Paiola; Hugo Arthuso	Fabiana Silva; Paula Pereira	Hugo Arthuso; Fabiana Silva
