= Badminton at the 2010 South American Games – Mixed doubles =

The Mixed Doubles event at the 2010 South American Games was held over March 21–24.

== Medalists ==
Gold	Silver	Bronze
Rodrigo Pacheco; Claudia Rivero; Peru	Alex Tjong; Yasmin Cury; Brazil	Mitchel Wongsodikromo; Crystal Leefmans; Suriname; Hugo Arthuso; Marina Eliezer; Brazil

== Draw ==
First Round
Alex Tjong (BRA); Yasmin Cury (BRA)	21	21
Jose Martin Villalba (ARG); Lorena Bugallo (ARG)	8	7
Mitchel Wongsodikromo (SUR); Crystal Leefmans (SUR)	21	21
Carlos Muñoz (COL); Liseth Benavides (COL)	12	10
Franco Monaco (ARG); Celina Juarez (ARG)	11	3
Rodrigo Pacheco (PER); Claudia Rivero (PER)	21	21
Andres Trigo (CHI); Ting Ting Hu (CHI)	21	21
Sergio Rincon (COL); Maria Vargas (COL)	7	8
Sebastian Teran (ECU); Edith Loza (ECU)	W.O.
Virgil Soeroredjo (SUR); Quennie Pawarosemito (SUR)

Second Round
1	Bruno Monteverde (PER); Claudia Zornoza (PER)	21	20	19
Alex Tjong (BRA); Yasmin Cury (BRA)	10	22	21
Esteban Mujica (CHI); Natalia Villegas (CHI)	14	16
Mitchel Wongsodikromo (SUR); Crystal Leefmans (SUR)	21	21
Rodrigo Pacheco (PER); Claudia Rivero (PER)	21	21
Andres Trigo (CHI); Ting Ting Hu (CHI)	8	7
Virgil Soeroredjo (SUR); Quennie Pawarosemito (SUR)	21	21	18
2	Hugo Arthuso (BRA); Marina Eliezer (BRA)	23	14	21

Semifinals
Alex Tjong (BRA); Yasmin Cury (BRA)	22	21	21
Mitchel Wongsodikromo (SUR); Crystal Leefmans (SUR)	24	17	12
Rodrigo Pacheco (PER); Claudia Rivero (PER)	21	21
2	Hugo Arthuso (BRA); Marina Eliezer (BRA)	15	9

Final
Alex Tjong (BRA); Yasmin Cury (BRA)	15	15
2	Rodrigo Pacheco (PER); Claudia Rivero (PER)	21	21
