= Ángela Ordóñez =

Colombian badminton player (born 1997)

Ángela Maria Hormiga Ordóñez
Personal information
- Born: Ángela María Hormiga Ordóñez; 4 July 1997 (age 28)

Sport
- Country: Colombia
- Sport: Badminton

Women's singles & doubles
- Highest ranking: 549 (WS 27 August 2015); 398 (WD 2 October 2014); 727 (XD 29 September 2016)
- BWF profile
Medal record
Women's badminton
Representing Colombia
South American Championships
Bronze medal – third place	2013 Temuco	Women's doubles

Ángela María Hormiga Ordóñez (born 4 July 1997) is a Colombian badminton player. She won a bronze medal in the women's doubles at the 2013 South American Badminton Championships with Liceth Sánchez.

In 2014, she reached the semi-finals of the Colombia International with Maryi Ordoñez Cabrera. In 2016, she won the Colombia International women's doubles title with Magly Villamizar Ordoñez.

== Achievements ==
=== South American Championships ===
Women's doubles

Year	Venue	Partner	Opponent	Score	Result	Ref
2013	Campo Deportivo Ñielol, Temuco, Chile	(Colombia) Liceth Sánchez	(Chile) Chou Ting Ting (Chile) Camila Macaya	7–21, 7–21	Bronze	

=== BWF International Challenge/Series (1 title) ===
Women's doubles

Year	Tournament	Partner	Opponent	Score	Result	Ref
2016	Colombia International	(Colombia) Magly Villamizar Ordoñez	(Colombia) Maryi Ordoñez Cabrera (Colombia) Natalia Romero	21–18, 18–21, 21–19	(gold) Winner	

BWF International Challenge tournament
BWF International Series tournament
BWF Future Series tournament
