= Badminton at the 2010 South American Games – Women's doubles =

The Women's Doubles event at the 2010 South American Games was held over March 21–24.

== Medalists ==
Gold	Silver	Bronze
Katherine Winder; Claudia Zornoza; Peru	Cristina Aicardi; Claudia Rivero; Peru	Ting Ting Hu; Natalia Villegas; Chile; Edith Loza; Denisse Mera; Ecuador

== Draw ==
First Round
Ting Ting Hu (CHI); Natalia Villegas (CHI)	21	21
Crystal Leefmans (SUR); Quennie Pawarosemito (SUR)	15	18
Daniela Blanco (COL); Laura Sanchez (COL)	16	17
Lorena Bugallo (ARG); Celina Juarez (ARG)	21	21

Second Round
1	Cristina Aicardi (PER); Claudia Rivero (PER)	21	21
Liseth Benavides (COL); Maria Vargas (COL)	6	2
Yasmin Cury (BRA); Paula Pereira (BRA)	18	16
Ting Ting Hu (CHI); Natalia Villegas (CHI)	21	21
Lorena Bugallo (ARG); Celina Juarez (ARG)	19	21	12
Edith Loza (ECU); Denisse Mera (ECU)	21	11	21
Marina Eliezer (BRA); Fabiana Silva (BRA)	19	19
2	Katherine Winder (PER); Claudia Zornoza (PER)	19	19

Semifinals
1	Cristina Aicardi (PER); Claudia Rivero (PER)	21	24
Ting Ting Hu (CHI); Natalia Villegas (CHI)	15	22
Edith Loza (ECU); Denisse Mera (ECU)	8	7
2	Katherine Winder (PER); Claudia Zornoza (PER)	21	21

Final
1	Cristina Aicardi (PER); Claudia Rivero (PER)	21	18	22
2	Katherine Winder (PER); Claudia Zornoza (PER)	10	21	24
