= Ana Paula Campos =

Brazilian badminton player (born 1994)

Personal information
- Born: Ana Paula Galbiatti Campos; 2 September 1994 (age 32) Campinas, São Paulo, Brazil

Sport
- Country: Brazil
- Sport: Badminton
- Coached by: Right

Women's
- Highest ranking: 110 (WS) 13 Nov 2014; 91 (WD) 14 Nov 2013; 127 (XD) 10 Apr 2014
- BWF profile
Medal record
Pan Am Championships
Silver medal – second place	2017 Santo Domingo	Mixed team
Silver medal – second place	2016 Campinas	Mixed team
Bronze medal – third place	2014 Markham	Mixed team
Bronze medal – third place	2013 Santo Domingo	Mixed team

Ana Paula Galbiatti Campos (born 2 September 1994) is a Brazilian female badminton player. Teamed-up with Fabiana Silva, she won the women's doubles title in 2014 Puerto Rico and 2015 Colombia. She also won the mixed doubles title at the Suriname International tournament partnered with Jonathan Persson of Germany.

== Achievements ==
=== BWF International Challenge/Series ===
Women's Doubles
Year	Tournament	Partner	Opponent	Score	Result
2015	Suriname International	(Brazil) Fabiana Silva	(Mexico) Haramara Gaitan (Mexico) Sabrina Solis	No match	(silver) Runner-up
2015	Puerto Rico International	(Brazil) Fabiana Silva	(Mexico) Haramara Gaitan (Mexico) Sabrina Solis	12-21, 15-21	(silver) Runner-up
2015	Colombia International	(Brazil) Fabiana Silva	(Mexico) Haramara Gaitan (Mexico) Sabrina Solis	21–18, 21–17	(gold) Winner
2015	Chile International	(Brazil) Fabiana Silva	(Brazil) Lohaynny Vicente (Brazil) Luana Vicente	18-21, 13-21	(silver) Runner-up
2014	Puerto Rico International	(Brazil) Fabiana Silva	(Peru) Camilla Garcia (Peru) Luz Maria Zornoza	21-18, 21-17	(gold) Winner
2014	Chile International	(Peru) Camila Duany	(Peru) Katherine Winder (Peru) Luz Maria Zornoza	2-11, 8-11, 3-11	(silver) Runner-up
2013	Puerto Rico International	(Brazil) Yasmin Cury	(Brazil) Paula Pereira (Brazil) Lohaynny Vicente	10-21, 12-21	(silver) Runner-up
2013	Santo Domingo Open	(Brazil) Yasmin Cury	(Brazil) Paula Pereira (Brazil) Lohaynny Vicente	14-21, 9-21	(silver) Runner-up

Mixed Doubles
Year	Tournament	Partner	Opponent	Score	Result
2015	Suriname International	(Germany) Jonathan Persson	(Suriname) Dylan Darmohoetomo (Suriname) Jill Sjauw Mook	21-9, 21-15	(gold) Winner

BWF International Challenge tournament
BWF International Series tournament
BWF Future Series tournament
