= Rong Schafer =

Chinese-American badminton player (born 1985)

Rong Schafer 荣博
Personal information
- Born: Rong Bo 荣博; 6 October 1985 (age 41) Beijing, China

Sport
- Country: United States
- Sport: Badminton

Women's
- Highest ranking: 33 (WS) 15 Oct 2015; 356 (WD) 1 Sep 2016; 235 (XD) 16 Oct 2014
- BWF profile

Rong Schafer (born Rong Bo (Chinese: 荣博); 6 October 1985) is a Chinese female badminton player, and now represented the United States. She grew up in Beijing, China, and started playing badminton at aged 8. In 2009, she won the Estonian International tournament in women's doubles event.

== Achievements ==
=== BWF International Challenge/Series ===
Women's singles
Year	Tournament	Opponent	Score	Result
2014	Mercosul International	(United States) Iris Wang	21–18, 17–21, 15–21	(silver) Runner-up
2014	Argentina International	(United States) Iris Wang	12–21, 15–21	(silver) Runner-up
2014	Chile International	(Peru) Luz Maria Zornoza	11–5, 11–9, 11–10	(gold) Winner
2015	Mercosul International	(Brazil) Lohaynny Vicente	21–17, 21–16	(gold) Winner
2015	Peru International	(Turkey) Neslihan Yiğit	21–17, 21–16	(gold) Winner
2015	White Nights	(Vietnam) Vũ Thị Trang	14–21, 14–21	(silver) Runner-up
2015	Guatemala International	(Portugal) Telma Santos	12–21, 21–11, 21–10	(gold) Winner

Women's doubles
Year	Tournament	Partner	Opponent	Score	Result
2009	Estonian International	(China) Cai Jiani	(Russia) Irina Khlebko (Russia) Ksenia Polikarpova	21–13, 21–15	(gold) Winner

Mixed doubles
Year	Tournament	Partner	Opponent	Score	Result
2014	Mercosul International	(Denmark) Søren Toft Hansen	(Brazil) Hugo Arthuso (Brazil) Fabiana Silva	23–21, 21–13	(gold) Winner
2014	Venezuela International	(Czech Republic) Milan Ludík	(Peru) Mario Cuba (Peru) Katherine Winder	21–16, 21–16	(gold) Winner

BWF International Challenge tournament
BWF International Series tournament
