= Andrés Corpancho =

Peruvian badminton player

Personal information
- Born: Andrés Eduardo Corpancho Fort; 1 December 1984 (age 41)
- Height: 1.88 m (6 ft 2 in)
- Weight: 81 kg (179 lb)

Sport
- Country: Peru
- Sport: Badminton
- Handedness: Right

Men's
- Highest ranking: 106 (MS) 18 June 2015; 113 (MD) 26 November 2015; 42 (XD) 2 April 2015
- BWF profile
Medal record
Badminton
Representing Peru
Pan Am Championships
Silver medal – second place	2009 Guadalajara	Mixed team
Silver medal – second place	2008 Lima	Mixed team
Bronze medal – third place	2014 Markham	Mixed doubles
Bronze medal – third place	2008 Lima	Men's singles
Bronze medal – third place	2007 Calgary	Men's singles
Bronze medal – third place	2005 Bridgetown	Men's doubles
South American Games
Gold medal – first place	2010 Medellín	Mixed team
Bronze medal – third place	2010 Medellín	Men's singles
Bronze medal – third place	2010 Medellín	Men's doubles

Andrés Eduardo Corpancho Fort (born 1 December 1984) is a Peruvian male badminton player. He competed at the 2015 Toronto Pan Am Games.

== Achievements ==
=== Pan Am Championships ===
Men's singles
Year	Venue	Opponent	Score	Result
2007	Calgary Winter Club; Calgary, Canada	(Canada) Stephan Wojcikiewicz	13–21, 19–21	Bronze
2008	Club de Regatas; Lima, Peru	(Canada) Stephan Wojcikiewicz	21-–16, 16–21, 12–21	Bronze

Men's doubles
Year	Venue	Partner	Opponent	Score	Result
2005	Saint Michael; Bridgetown, Barbados	(Peru) Javier Jimeno	(Canada) Mike Beres (Canada) William Milroy	2–15, 5–15	Bronze

Mixed doubles
Year	Venue	Partner	Opponent	Score	Result
2014	Markham Pan Am Centre; Markham, Canada	(Peru) Luz Maria Zornoza	(Canada) Toby Ng (Canada) Alex Bruce	21–16, 12–21, 13–21	Bronze

=== South American Games ===
Men's singles
Year	Venue	Opponent	Score	Result
2010	Medellín, Colombia	(Brazil) Hugo Arthuso	17–21, 21–14, 17–21	Bronze

Men's doubles
Year	Venue	Partner	Opponent	Score	Result
2010	Medellín, Colombia	(Peru) Bruno Monteverde	(Brazil) Daniel Paiola (Brazil) Alex Tjong	20–22, 11–21	Bronze

=== BWF International Challenge/Series ===
Men's singles
Year	Tournament	Opponent	Score	Result
2007	Puerto Rico International	(Spain) José Antonio Crespo	21–16, 14–21, 16–21	(silver) Runner-up
2007	Brazil International	(United States) Eric Go	21–17, 16–21, 19–21	(silver) Runner-up
2008	Peru International	(Guatemala) Kevin Cordon	14–21, 14–21	(silver) Runner-up
2008	Brazil International	(Guatemala) Kevin Cordón	15–21, 14–21	(silver) Runner-up
2009	Brazil International	(Brazil) Thomas Moretti	23–21, 13–21, 21–12	(gold) Winner
2011	Colombia International	(Brazil) Lucas Alves	22–20, 21–9	(gold) Winner
2014	Colombia International	(Guatemala) Heymard Humblers	9–11, 4–11, 2–11	(silver) Runner-up

Men's doubles
Year	Tournament	Partner	Opponent	Score	Result
2008	Peru International	(Peru) Rodrigo Pacheco	(Peru) Francisco Ugaz (Spain) José Antonio Crespo	15–21, 15–21	(silver) Runner-up
2008	Brazil International	(Peru) Bruno Monteverde	(Brazil) Lucas Araújo (Brazil) Paulo von Scala	21–16, 21–14	(gold) Winner
2011	Colombia International	(Brazil) Lucas Alves	(United States) Mathew Fogarty (United States) Nicholas Jinadasa	13–21, 21–15, 17–21	(silver) Runner-up
2013	Argentina International	(Peru) Gonzalo Duany	(Brazil) Hugo Arthuso (Brazil) Alex Yuwan Tjong	18–21, 19–21	(silver) Runner-up

Mixed doubles
Year	Tournament	Partner	Opponent	Score	Result
2007	Puerto Rico International	(Peru) Valeria Rivero	(Puerto Rico) Gonzalez Irytsha (Puerto Rico) Hector Rios	21–7, 21–3	(gold) Winner
2007	Brazil International	(Peru) Valeria Rivero	(Brazil) Filipe Toledo (Brazil) Paula Pereira	21–7, 21–13	(gold) Winner
2008	Peru International	(Peru) Cristina Aicardi	(Peru) Martin del Valle (Peru) Daniela Cuba	15–21, 21–15, 21–18	(gold) Winner
2008	Miami Pan Am International	(Peru) Cristina Aicardi	(Peru) Martin del Valle (Peru) Katherine Winder	21–14, 18–21, 21–16	(gold) Winner
2008	Puerto Rico International	(Peru) Katherine Winder	(Mexico) Jesus Aguilar (Mexico) Victoria Montero	21–10, 21–10	(gold) Winner
2009	Brazil International	(Peru) Lorena Duany	(Spain) Alejandro Barriga (Spain) Sandra Chirlaque	21–14, 17–21, 18–21	(silver) Runner-up
2011	Colombia International	(Brazil) Renata Carvalho	(Argentina) Federico Diaz (Argentina) Victoria Valdesolo	21–12, 22–20	(gold) Winner
2014	Giraldilla International	(Peru) Luz Maria Zornoza	(Cuba) Osleni Guerrero (Cuba) Tahimara Oropeza	16–21, 15–21	(silver) Runner-up
2014	Chile International	(Peru) Luz Maria Zornoza	(Peru) Mario Cuba (Peru) Katherine Winder	3–11, 11–8, 10–11, 10–11	(silver) Runner-up
2014	Colombia International	(Peru) Luz Maria Zornoza	(Peru) Mario Cuba (Peru) Katherine Winder	11–10, 5–11, 11–7, 5–11, 11–10	(gold) Winner
2014	Suriname International	(Peru) Luz Maria Zornoza	(Peru) Mario Cuba (Peru) Katherine Winder	12–21, 8–21	(silver) Runner-up
2014	Puerto Rico International	(Peru) Luz Maria Zornoza	(Dominican Republic) Nelson Javier (Dominican Republic) Vibieca Beronica	21–19, 21–16	(gold) Winner
2015	Peru International Series	(Peru) Luz Maria Zornoza	(Peru) Mario Cuba (Peru) Katherine Winder	13–21, 13–21	(silver) Runner-up

BWF International Challenge tournament
BWF International Series tournament
BWF Future Series tournament
