= Martín Trejo =

Argentine badminton player and coach

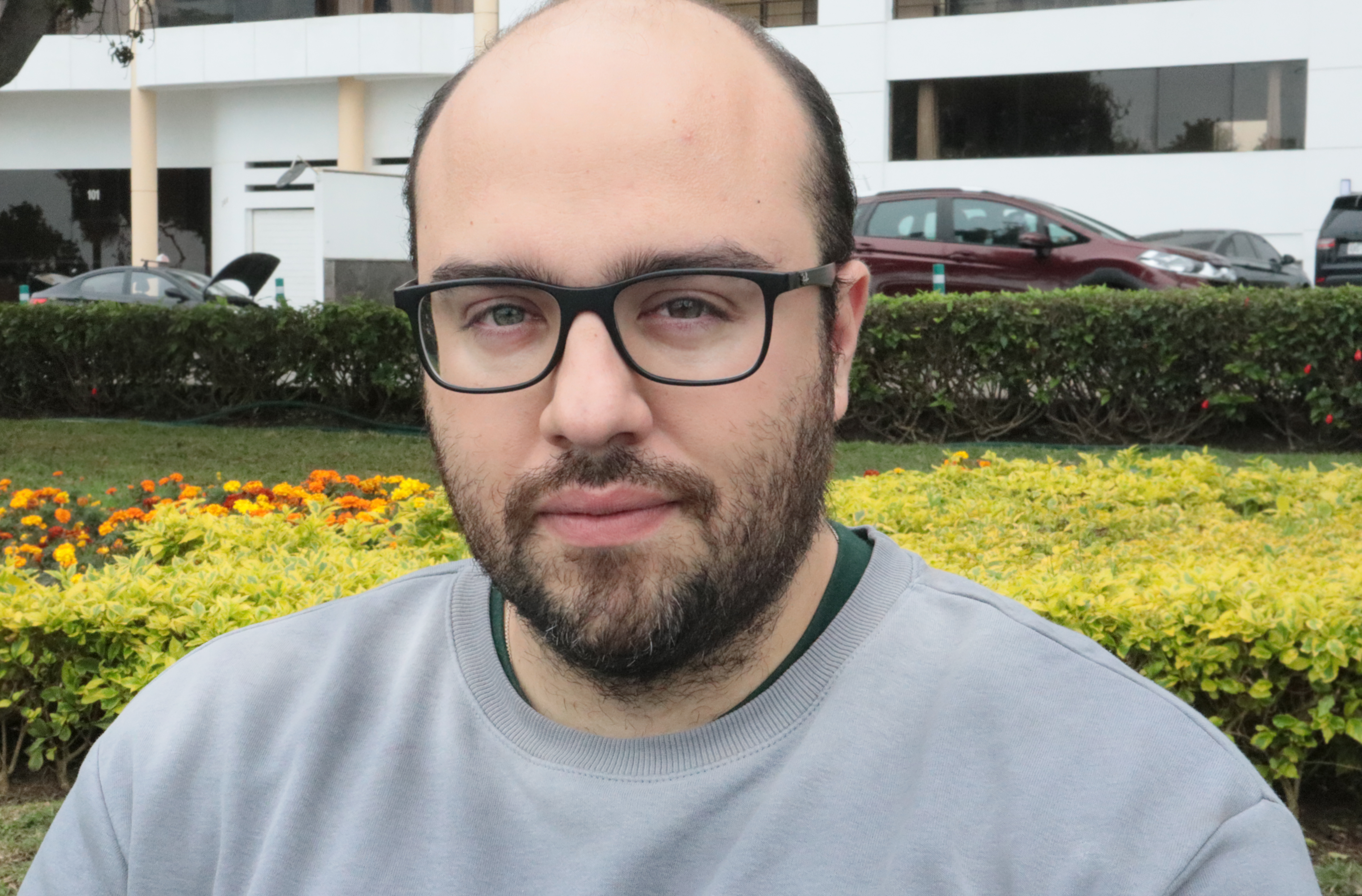

Personal information
- Born: 9 November 1993 (age 32)

Sport
- Country: Argentina
- Sport: Badminton
- Handedness: Right

Men's singles & doubles
- Highest ranking: 476 (MS 2 May 2013); 351 (MD 26 November 2015)
- BWF profile
Medal record
Men's badminton
Representing Argentina
South American Championships
Bronze medal – third place	2013 Temuco	Men's doubles
Bronze medal – third place	2013 Temuco	Mixed team
Bronze medal – third place	2015 Foz do Iguaçu	Mixed team

Martín Trejo (born 9 November 1993) is an Argentine badminton player, and now works as national coach. Trejo won a bronze medal in men's doubles at the 2013 South American Badminton Championships.

He was also part of the Argentine squad that won bronze in the mixed team event at the South American Championships in 2013 and 2015.

== Achievements ==
=== South American Championships ===
Men's doubles

Year	Venue	Partner	Opponent	Score	Result
2013	Campo Deportivo Ñielol, Temuco, Chile	(Argentina) Tomás Thouyaret	(Peru) Andrés Corpancho (Peru) Sebastian Macías	10–21, 10–21	Bronze

=== BWF International Challenge/Series ===
Men's doubles

Year	Tournament	partner	Opponent	Score	Result
2016	Argentina International	(Argentina) Javier de Paepe	(Argentina) Dino Delmastro (Argentina) Mateo Delmastro	19–21, 21–18, 21–11	(gold) Winner

BWF International Challenge tournament
BWF International Series tournament
BWF Future Series tournament
