= Badminton at the 2010 South American Games – Men's doubles =

The Men's Doubles event at the 2010 South American Games was held over March 21–24.

== Medalists ==
Gold	Silver	Bronze
Antonio de Vinatea; Rodrigo Pacheco; Peru	Daniel Paiola; Alex Tjong; Brazil	Sebastian Teran; Santiago Zambrano; Ecuador; Andrés Corpancho; Bruno Monteverde; Peru

== Draw ==
First Round
Esteban Mujica (CHI); Andres Trigo (CHI)	17	13
Antonio de Vinatea (PER); Rodrigo Pacheco (PER)	21	21
Virgil Soeroredjo (SUR); Mitchel Wongsodikromo (SUR)	21	21
Carlos Muñoz (COL); Sergio Rincon (COL)	10	15

Second Round
1	Sebastian Teran (ECU); Santiago Zambrano (ECU)	21	21
Giovanni Pulgarin (COL); Cristian Vargas (COL)	12	18
Joaquin Berrios (ARG); Jose martin Villalba (ARG)	14	16
Antonio de Vinatea (PER); Rodrigo Pacheco (PER)	21	21
3	Virgil Soeroredjo (SUR); Mitchel Wongsodikromo (SUR)	13	16
Andrés Corpancho (PER); Bruno Monteverde (PER)	21	21
Federico Diaz (ARG); Franco Monaco (ARG)	8	11
Daniel Paiola (BRA); Alex Tjong (BRA)	21	21

Semifinals
1	Sebastian Teran (ECU); Santiago Zambrano (ECU)	5	10
Antonio de Vinatea (PER); Rodrigo Pacheco (PER)	21	21
3	Andrés Corpancho (PER); Bruno Monteverde (PER)	20	11
Daniel Paiola (BRA); Alex Tjong (BRA)	22	21

Final
1	Antonio de Vinatea (PER); Rodrigo Pacheco (PER)	21	21
8	Daniel Paiola (BRA); Alex Tjong (BRA)	14	19
