= Hiroko Nagamine =

Japanese badminton player

Personal information
- Born: 19 March 1979 (age 47) Miyazaki Prefecture, Japan
- Height: 1.67 m (5 ft 6 in)
- Weight: 66 kg (146 lb)

Sport
- Country: Japan
- Sport: Badminton
- Handedness: Left
- Event: Women's doubles

Women's doubles
- BWF profile

Hiroko Nagamine (永峰 弘子, Nagamine Hiroko; born 19 March 1979) is a former Japanese badminton player. She was part of the Sanko Co, Ltd team. Nagamine graduated from the Kumamotoshinaijogakuin Chugakukoto School, and in 2000, she competed at the Summer Olympics in Sydney, Australia in the women's doubles event partnered with Satomi Igawa. Together with Igawa, they won international tournament in Cuba, Netherlands, Peru, and Chile.

== Achievements ==
=== IBF International ===
Women's doubles

Year	Tournament	Partner	Opponent	Score	Result	Ref
2000	Chile International	(Japan) Satomi Igawa	(Canada) Denyse Julien (Canada) Charmaine Reid	15–10, 15–0	(gold) Winner	
2000	Peru International	(Japan) Satomi Igawa	(Canada) Denyse Julien (Canada) Charmaine Reid	15–6, 15–8	(gold) Winner	
2000	Dutch International	(Japan) Satomi Igawa	(Netherlands) Betty Krab (Netherlands) Ginny Severien	15–5, 15–8	(gold) Winner	
2000	Cuba International	(Japan) Satomi Igawa	(Japan) Naomi Murakami (Japan) Hiromi Yamada	15–12, 15–5	(gold) Winner	
