= Micaela Suárez =

Argentine badminton player (born 2000)

Personal information
- Born: Micaela Belén Suárez; 28 January 2000 (age 26) Neuquén, Neuquén, Argentina

Sport
- Country: Argentina
- Sport: Badminton

Women's singles & doubles
- Highest ranking: 578 (WS 12 February 2019); 597 (XD 12 May 2016)
- BWF profile

Micaela Belén Suárez (born 28 January 2000) is an Argentine badminton player. She was the mixed doubles champion at the 2016 Argentina International partnered with Mateo Delmastro.

== Achievements ==
=== BWF International Challenge/Series ===
Mixed doubles
Year	Tournament	Partner	Opponent	Score	Result
2016	Argentina International	(Argentina) Mateo Delmastro	(Argentina) Javier de Paepe (Argentina) Natalia Montiel	18–21, 23–21, 21–12	(gold) Winner

BWF International Challenge tournament
BWF International Series tournament
BWF Future Series tournament
