= Jessica Hopton =

English badminton player (born 1996)

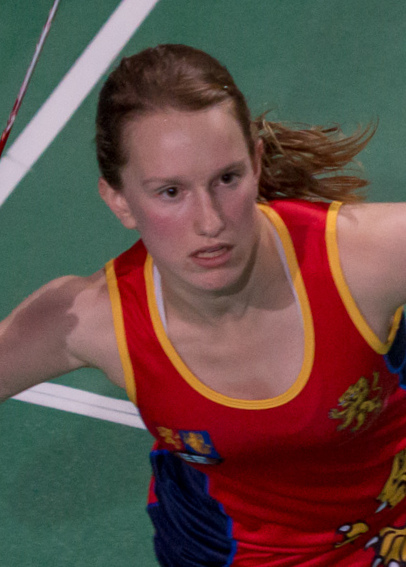
- Hopton in 2014

Personal information
- Nickname: Hoppers!
- Born: 28 November 1996 (age 29)
- Height: 5 ft 1 in (155 cm)

Sport
- Country: England
- Sport: Badminton

Women's doubles
- Highest ranking: 46 (WD with Jessica Pugh 15 November 2022); 92 (XD with Michael Roe 22 November 2018)
- BWF profile

Jessica Hopton (born 28 November 1996) is an English badminton player.

== Career ==
In 2021, she became a national champion of England after winning the women's doubles, with Jessica Pugh at the 2021 English National Badminton Championships.

== Achievements ==
=== BWF International (1 title, 3 runners-up) ===
Women's doubles
Year	Tournament	Partner	Opponent	Score	Result
2018	Estonian International	(England) Jenny Moore	(Russia) Ekaterina Bolotova (Russia) Alina Davletova	10–21, 10–21	(silver) Runner-up
2018	Irish Open	(England) Victoria Williams	(England) Emily Westwood (Malaysia) Yang Li Lian	15–21, 21–19, 19–21	(silver) Runner-up

Mixed doubles
Year	Tournament	Partner	Opponent	Score	Result
2017	Welsh International	(England) Michael Roe	(Denmark) Søren Toft Hansen (Denmark) Pernille Bundgaard	21–18, 11–21, 24–22	(gold) Winner
2018	Hellas International	(England) Michael Roe	(Bulgaria) Dimitar Yanakiev (Bulgaria) Mariya Mitsova	22–24, 14–21	(silver) Runner-up

BWF International Challenge tournament
BWF International Series tournament
BWF Future Series tournament

=== BWF Junior International (1 title) ===
Girls' doubles
Year	Tournament	Partner	Opponent	Score	Result
2014	Swiss Junior International	(England) Lydia Powell	(England) Ira Banerjee (England) Jessica Pugh	11–10, 11–8, 7–11, 11–5	(gold) Winner

BWF Junior International Grand Prix tournament
BWF Junior International Challenge tournament
BWF Junior International Series tournament
BWF Junior Future Series tournament
