= Søren Toft Hansen =

Danish badminton player (born 1992)

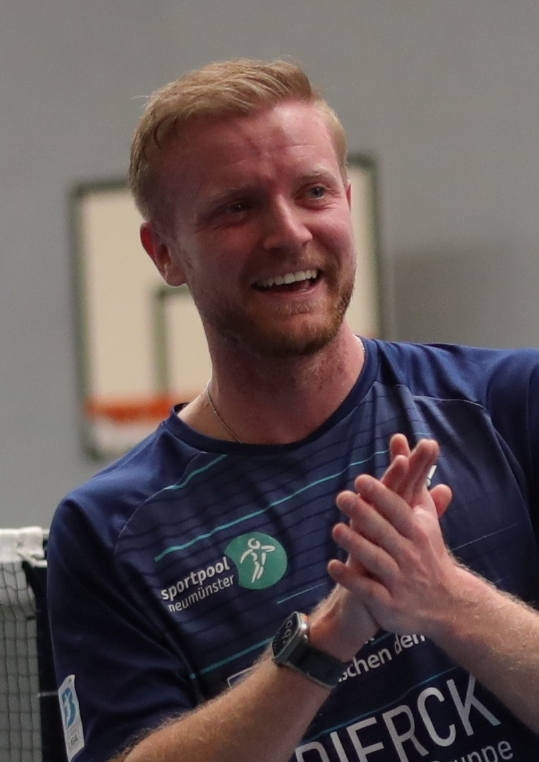
- Toft Hansen in 2025

Personal information
- Born: 24 October 1992 (age 34) Nyborg, Denmark
- Height: 1.87 m (6 ft 2 in)
- Weight: 85 kg (187 lb)

Sport
- Country: Denmark
- Sport: Badminton

Men's singles & doubles
- Highest ranking: 156 (MS 4 June 2015); 166 (MD 30 November 2017); 235 (XD 16 October 2014)
- BWF profile

Søren Toft Hansen (born 24 October 1992) is a Danish badminton player. He started his badminton career in Nyborg when he was 16. In the men's singles event, he won the 2017 Jamaica International tournament, and in the doubles event, he won the 2014 Mercosul International in Brazil, 2015 Lithuanian International, and also 2017 Bulgarian Open.

== Achievements ==
=== BWF International Challenge/Series ===
Men's singles
Year	Tournament	Opponent	Score	Result
2014	Norwegian International	(Estonia) Raul Must	16–21, 14–21	(silver) Runner-up
2017	Jamaica International	(Czech Republic) Adam Mendrek	21–14, 14–21, 22–20	(gold) Winner
2017	Morocco International	(France) Lucas Claerbout	14–21, 13–21	(silver) Runner-up

Men's doubles
Year	Tournament	Partner	Opponent	Score	Result
2017	Bulgarian Open	(Denmark) Mathias Thyrri	(Denmark) Jeppe Bay (Denmark) Rasmus Kjær	21–16, 21–12	(gold) Winner

Mixed doubles
Year	Tournament	Partner	Opponent	Score	Result
2014	Mercosul International	(United States) Bo Rong	(Brazil) Hugo Arthuso (Brazil) Fabiana Silva	23–21, 21–13	(gold) Winner
2015	Lithuanian International	(France) Teshana Vignes Waran	(Russia) Andrey Parokhodin (Russia) Anastasia Chervyakova	21–14, 21–17	(gold) Winner
2017	Welsh International	(Denmark) Pernille Bundgaard	(England) Michael Roe (England) Jessica Hopton	18–21, 21–11, 22–24	(silver) Runner-up

BWF International Challenge tournament
BWF International Series tournament
BWF Future Series tournament
