= Giovanni Toti (badminton) =

Italian badminton player

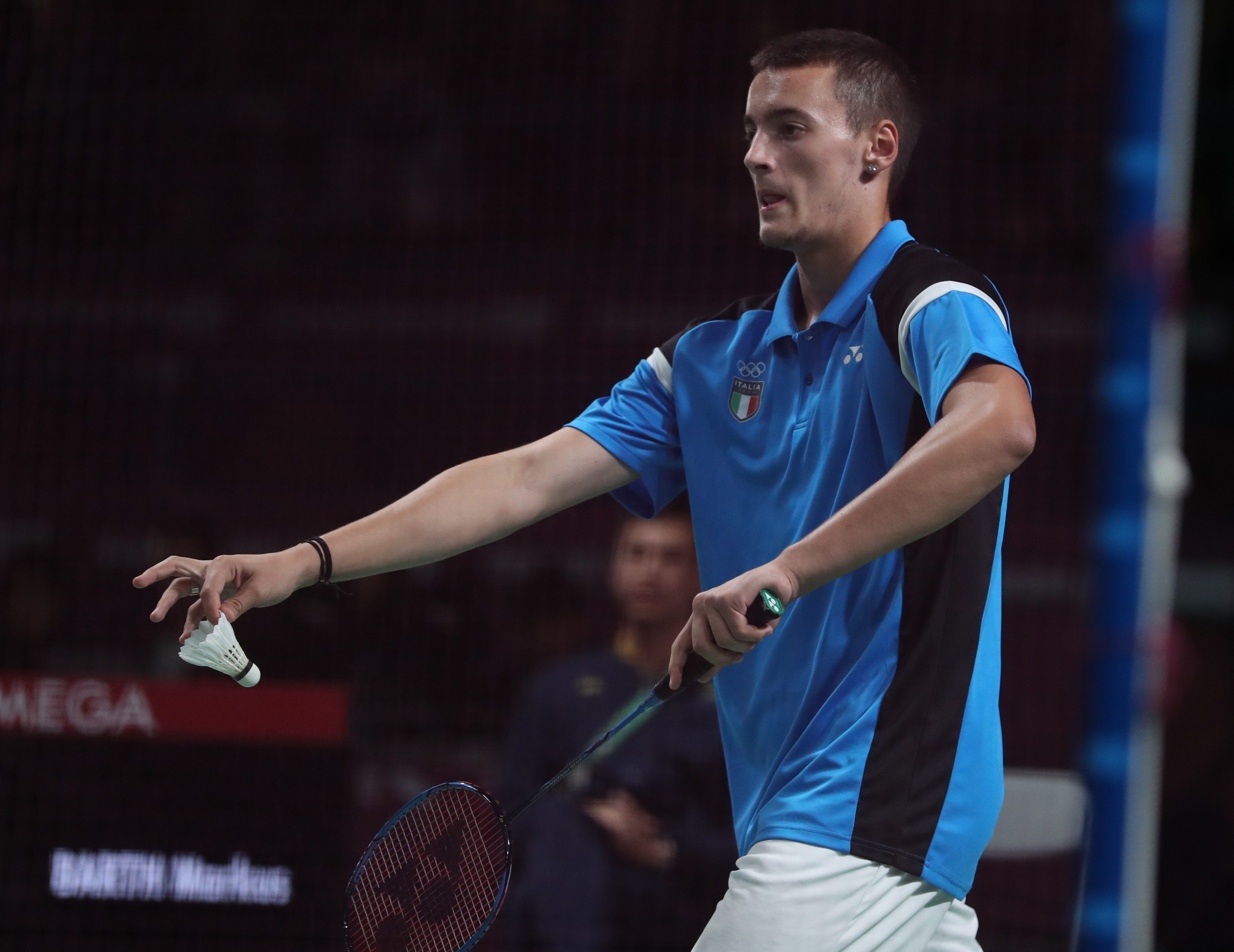
- Toti at the 2018 Summer Youth Olympics

Personal information
- Born: 28 December 2000 (age 25) Chiari, Lombardy, Italy
- Years active: Left
- Height: 1.83 m (6 ft 0 in)

Sport
- Country: Italy
- Sport: Badminton

Men's singles & doubles
- Highest ranking: 66 (MS, 30 January 2024); 148 (MD with Fabio Caponio, 20 December 2022)
- Current ranking: 84 (MS, 6 October 2026)
- BWF profile
Medal record
Men's badminton
Representing Italy
Mediterranean Games
Bronze medal – third place	2022 Oran	Men's doubles
Bronze medal – third place	2026 Taranto	Men's singles
Representing (International Olympic Committee) Mixed-NOCs
Youth Olympic Games
Gold medal – first place	2018 Buenos Aires	Mixed team

Giovanni Toti (born 28 December 2000) is an Italian badminton player from Chiari. He represented Italy in men's singles at the 2024 Summer Olympics. Toti also won a bronze medal in men's doubles at the 2022 Mediterranean Games.

== Career ==
In 2017, he won the Mauritius International tournament in the men's doubles event. In April 2018, he reached the finals of both men's singles and doubles at the Argentina International. In October 2018, he competed in the 2018 Summer Youth Olympics and won a gold medal in the mixed team relays. In boys' singles, he won against Julien Carraggi 17–21, 21–17, 21–12 but was eliminated in the group stage after losing the next two matches to Tomás Toledano and Li Shifeng.

In 2021, he was a runner-up at the Slovenia Future Series. He also partnered with Fabio Caponio and achieved runner-up position at the Mexican International and the El Salvador International. In 2022, Toti and Caponio competed in the 2022 Mediterranean Games and won the bronze medal in the men's doubles event. He also won the Guatemala International in 2022, beating Uriel Canjura of El Salvador in the final. In 2023, he won the Venezuela International.

In 2023, he competed in the 2023 European Games men's singles event. He advanced to the knockout stages after defeating Dominik Kwinta of Poland and Teodor Ioan Cioroboiu of Romania to finish second in the group. In the round of 16, he lost to Felix Burestedt of Sweden.

In 2024, he qualified for the men's singles event at the 2024 Summer Olympics. Drawn to Group A with Sören Opti of Suriname and world number 1 Shi Yuqi of China, he faced Opti in the opening match and won the first game 21–8. In the second game, while leading 4–1 up, his opponent had to retire due to injury. Toti became the first Italian to win a match in badminton at the Olympics. In the next match, he lost to Shi Yuqi 21–9, 21–10 and was eliminated in the group stage.

== Achievements ==
=== Mediterranean Games ===
Men's doubles
Year	Venue	Partner	Opponent	Score	Result	Ref.
2022	Multipurpose Omnisports Hall; Oued Tlélat, Algeria	(Italy) Fabio Caponio	(Spain) Pablo Abián (Spain) Luis Enrique Peñalver	21–17, 15–21, 19–21	Bronze	

=== BWF International Challenge/Series (6 titles, 9 runners-up) ===
Men's singles
Year	Tournament	Opponent	Score	Result
2018	Argentina International	(Brazil) Fabrício Farias	19–21, 18–21	(silver) Runner-up
2021	Slovenia Future Series	(Indonesia) Andi Fadel Muhammad	13–21, 12–21	(silver) Runner-up
2022	Guatemala International	(El Salvador) Uriel Canjura	22–20, 22–20	(gold) Winner
2023	Venezuela International	(Italy) Fabio Caponio	21–12, 22–20	(gold) Winner
2023	Guatemala International	(Guatemala) Kevin Cordón	8–21, 19–21	(silver) Runner-up
2023	Suriname International	(El Salvador) Uriel Canjura	11–21, 12–21	(silver) Runner-up
2025	Egypt International	(Canada) Xiaodong Sheng	21–15, 20–22, 22–20	(gold) Winner
2026	Perú International	(Sri Lanka) Dumindu Abeywickrama	21–15, 21–16	(gold) Winner
2026	Polish International	(South Korea) Choi Pyeong-gang	19–21, 10–21	(silver) Runner-up
2026	Guatemala International	(Brazil) Jonathan Matias	21–19, 17–21, 12–21	(silver) Runner-up

Men's doubles
Year	Tournament	Partner	Opponent	Score	Result
2017	Mauritius International	(Italy) Fabio Caponio	(Mauritius) Aatish Lubah (Mauritius) Julien Paul	13–21, 23–21, 21–16	(gold) Winner
2018	Argentina International	(Italy) Enrico Baroni	(Argentina) Mateo Delmastro (Argentina) Federico Díaz	22–20, 21–15	(gold) Winner
2021	Internacional Mexicano	(Italy) Fabio Caponio	(Canada) Adam Dong (Canada) Nyl Yakura	10–21, 10–21	(silver) Runner-up
2021	El Salvador International	(Italy) Fabio Caponio	(Brazil) Jonathan Matias (Brazil) Artur Silva Pomoceno	11–21, 21–14, 17–21	(silver) Runner-up

Mixed doubles
Year	Tournament	Partner	Opponent	Score	Result
2026	Perú International	(Italy) Fernanda Saponara	(Guatemala) Christopher Martínez (Guatemala) Diana Corleto	21–19, 19–21, 11–21	(silver) Runner-up

BWF International Challenge tournament
BWF International Series tournament
BWF Future Series tournament
