= Javier de Paepe =

Argentine badminton player (born 1990)

Personal information
- Born: Javier Pierre de Paepe; 7 June 1990 (age 36)
- Height: 1.89 m (6 ft 2 in)
- Weight: 82 kg (181 lb)

Sport
- Country: Argentina
- Sport: Badminton

Men's singles & doubles
- Highest ranking: 731 (MS 14 March 2013); 351 (MD 26 November 2015); 965 (XD 17 July 2014)
- BWF profile

Javier Pierre de Paepe (born 6 July 1990) is an Argentine badminton player. He taught architecture at the University of Buenos Aires, and participated in the 2015 Summer Universiade in Gwangju, South Korea.

== Achievements ==
=== BWF International Challenge or Series ===
Men's doubles

| Year | Tournament | partner | Opponent | Score | Result |
|---|---|---|---|---|---|
| 2016 | Argentina International | (Argentina) Martin Trejo | (Argentina) Dino Delmastro (Argentina) Mateo Delmastro | 19–21, 21–18, 21–11 | (gold) Winner |

Mixed doubles

| Year | Tournament | partner | Opponent | Score | Result |
|---|---|---|---|---|---|
| 2016 | Argentina International | (Argentina) Natalia Montiel | (Argentina) Mateo Delmastro (Argentina) Micaela Suarez | 21–18, 21–23, 12–21 | (silver) Runner-up |

BWF International Challenge tournament
BWF International Series tournament
BWF Future Series tournament
