= Colombia International =

Badminton tournament in Colombia

The Colombia international is an open international badminton tournament held in Colombia. The tournament has been a Future Series level since 2009 and was upgraded to an International Series in 2014.

The 2025 edition of the tournament, titled the I La Perla del Otun Future Series, is scheduled to take place in Pereira, Colombia, from 24 to 28 September 2025. This event is sanctioned by the Badminton World Federation as a Grade 3 - Future Series level.

== Previous winners ==
| Year | Men's singles | Women's singles | Men's doubles | Women's doubles | Mixed doubles | Ref |
|---|---|---|---|---|---|---|
| 2009 | (Brazil) Daniel Paiola | (Peru) Katherine Winder | (United States) David Neumann (United States) Mathew Fogarty | No competition | (Peru) Mario Cuba (Peru) Katherine Winder | |
| 2010 | (Peru) Rodrigo Pacheco | (Peru) Claudia Rivero | (Peru) Pablo Aguilar (Peru) Bruno Monteverde | (Peru) Cristina Aicardi (Peru) Claudia Rivero | (Peru) Rodrigo Pacheco (Peru) Claudia Rivero | |
| 2011 | (Peru) Andrés Corpancho | (France) Barbara Matias | (United States) Mathew Fogarty (United States) Nicholas Jinadasa | (Puerto Rico) Daneysha Santana (Peru) Luz María Zornoza | (Peru) Andrés Corpancho (Brazil) Renata Carvalho | |
| 2012 | No competition | | | | | |
| 2013 | (Colombia) Raúl Pineda | (Colombia) Lesly Moncayo | No competition | | | |
| 2014 | (Guatemala) Humblers Heymard | (Portugal) Telma Santos | (Guatemala) Humblers Heymard (Guatemala) Adams Rodriguez | (Peru) Katherine Winder (Peru) Luz María Zornoza | (Peru) Andrés Corpancho (Peru) Luz María Zornoza | |
| 2015 | (United States) Bjorn Seguin | (Italy) Jeanine Cicognini | (Brazil) Daniel Paiola (Brazil) Alex Tjong | (Brazil) Ana Paula Campos (Brazil) Fabiana Silva | (Brazil) Alex Tjong (Brazil) Fabiana Silva | |
| 2016 | (Guatemala) Ruben Castellanos | (Guatemala) Nikté Sotomayor | (Guatemala) Ruben Castellanos (Guatemala) Anibal Marroquin | (Colombia) Ángela Hormiga (Colombia) Magly Villamizar | (Guatemala) Jonathan Solis (Guatemala) Nikté Sotomayor | |
| 2017– 2024 | No competition | | | | | |
| 2025 | (United States) Enrico Asuncion | (Peru) Inés Castillo | (United States) Enrico Asuncion (Malta) Samuel Cassar | (Colombia) Juliana Giraldo (Colombia) Karen Patiño | (Argentina) Nicolas Oliva (Argentina) Ailén Oliva | |
| 2026 | Cancelled | | | | | |

== Performances by nation ==
As of the 2025 edition

| Pos | Nation | MS | WS | MD | WD | XD | Total |
|---|---|---|---|---|---|---|---|
| 1 | Peru | 2 | 3 | 1 | 2.5 | 3.5 | 12 |
| 2 | Guatemala | 2 | 1 | 2 | 0 | 1 | 6 |
| 3 | Brazil | 1 | 0 | 1 | 1 | 1.5 | 4.5 |
| 3 | United States | 2 | 0 | 2.5 | 0 | 0 | 4.5 |
| 5 | Colombia* | 1 | 1 | 0 | 2 | 0 | 4 |
| 6 | Argentina | 0 | 0 | 0 | 0 | 1 | 1 |
| 6 | France | 0 | 1 | 0 | 0 | 0 | 1 |
| 6 | Italy | 0 | 1 | 0 | 0 | 0 | 1 |
| 6 | Portugal | 0 | 1 | 0 | 0 | 0 | 1 |
| 10 | Malta | 0 | 0 | 0.5 | 0 | 0 | 0.5 |
| 10 | Puerto Rico | 0 | 0 | 0 | 0.5 | 0 | 0.5 |
| Total | | 8 | 8 | 7 | 6 | 7 | 36 |

* Host nation
