= Michael Roe (badminton) =

English badminton player (born 1995)

Personal information
- Born: 5 April 1995 (age 31)

Sport
- Country: England
- Sport: Badminton
- BWF profile

Michael Roe (born 1995) is an English badminton player and a former national doubles champion.

== Biography ==
Roe became an English National doubles champion after winning the English National Badminton Championships men's doubles title with Matthew Clare in 2018.

He also won both the men's doubles and mixed doubles titles at the 2017 Welsh International.

== Achievements ==
=== BWF International (2 titles, 1 runner-up) ===
Men's doubles
Year	Tournament	Partner	Opponent	Score	Result
2017	Welsh International	(England) Oliver Baczala	(France) Eloi Adam (France) Samy Corvee	21–23, 23–21, 22–20	(gold) Winner

Mixed doubles
Year	Tournament	Partner	Opponent	Score	Result
2017	Welsh International	(England) Jessica Hopton	(Denmark) Søren Toft Hansen (Denmark) Pernille Bundgaard	21–18, 11–21, 24–22	(gold) Winner
2018	Hellas International	(England) Jessica Hopton	(Bulgaria) Dimitar Yanakiev (Bulgaria) Mariya Mitsova	22–24, 14–21	(silver) Runner-up

BWF International Challenge tournament
BWF International Series tournament
BWF Future Series tournament
