= Ximena Bellido =

Peruvian badminton player

Personal information
- Born: 10 September 1966 (age 60) Miraflores District, Lima, Peru.

Sport
- Country: Peru
- Sport: Badminton
- Event: Doubles
Medal record
Women's badminton
Representing Peru
Pan American Championships
Silver medal – second place	1987 Lima	Women's doubles
Silver medal – second place	1987 Lima	Mixed team
Bronze medal – third place	1987 Lima	Women's singles
Bronze medal – third place	1989 Mexico City	Mixed team
Bronze medal – third place	1997 Winnipeg	Mixed team
South American Championships
Gold medal – first place	1988 Montevideo	Women's singles
Gold medal – first place	1984 Buenos Aires	Women's doubles
Gold medal – first place	1988 Montevideo	Women's doubles
Gold medal – first place	1996 Buenos Aires	Women's doubles
Gold medal – first place	1998 Campinas	Women's doubles
Gold medal – first place	1984 Buenos Aires	Mixed team
Gold medal – first place	1988 Montevideo	Mixed team
Gold medal – first place	1996 Buenos Aires	Mixed team
Gold medal – first place	1998 Campinas	Mixed team
Silver medal – second place	1996 Buenos Aires	Women's singles
Silver medal – second place	1996 Buenos Aires	Mixed doubles
Bronze medal – third place	1984 Buenos Aires	Women's singles
Bronze medal – third place	1984 Buenos Aires	Mixed doubles
Bronze medal – third place	1998 Campinas	Mixed doubles

Ximena Aída Marío Bellido Ugarte (born 10 September 1966) is a retired Peruvian badminton player. Ximena Bellido was one of the dominant players in her home country and on the South American continent in the 1980s and 1990s. Bellido is the 15-time former National champion, 4-time South American champion and winner of several international titles in Brazil, Argentina and United States. She also represented her country in 1999 Pan American games in Winnipeg, Canada and many editions of World championships across three disciplines. Bellido was conferred with Sports Laurel award in 1988 after winning South American championships.

== Achievements ==
=== Pan Am Championships ===
Women's singles
Year	Venue	Opponent	Score	Result
1987	Club de Regatas Lima, Peru	(Canada) Denyse Julien	2–11, 7–11	Bronze

Women's doubles
Year	Venue	Partner	Opponent	Score	Result
1987	Club de Regatas Lima, Peru	(Peru) Gloria Jiménez	(Canada) Linda Cloutier (Canada) Denyse Julien	7–15, 16–18	Silver

=== South American Championships ===
Women's singles
Year	Venue	Opponent	Score	Result
1984	Coliseo del Parque Sarmiento; Buenos Aires, Argentina			Bronze
1988	Montevideo, Uruguay			Gold
1996	Coliseo del Parque Sarmiento; Buenos Aires, Argentina	(Peru) Lorena Blanco	2–11, 2–11	Silver

Women's doubles
Year	Venue	Partner	Opponent	Score	Result
1984	Coliseo del Parque Sarmiento; Buenos Aires, Argentina	(Peru) Gloria Jiménez	(Peru) Carmen Bellido (Peru) Silvia Jiménez		Gold
1988	Montevideo, Uruguay	(Peru) Gloria Jiménez			Gold
1996	Coliseo del Parque Sarmiento; Buenos Aires, Argentina	(Peru) Lorena Blanco	(Peru) Lucero Chueca (Peru) Doriana Rivera	15–8, 15–9	Gold
1998	Clube Fonte São Paulo Gymnasium; Campinas, Brazil	(Peru) Lorena Blanco	(Peru) Sandra Jimeno (Peru) Doriana Rivera		Gold

Mixed doubles
Year	Venue	Partner	Opponent	Score	Result
1984	Coliseo del Parque Sarmiento; Buenos Aires, Argentina	(Peru) Germán Valdez			Bronze
1996	Coliseo del Parque Sarmiento; Buenos Aires, Argentina	(Peru) Mario Carulla	(Peru) Gustavo Salazar (Peru) Lorena Blanco	10–15, 11–15	Silver
1998	Clube Fonte São Paulo Gymnasium; Campinas, Brazil	(Peru) José Iturriaga			Bronze

=== IBF International ===
Women's singles
Year	Tournament	Opponent	Score	Result
1996	São Paulo Cup	(Peru) Doriana Rivera	11–6, 11–2	(gold) Winner
1997	São Paulo Cup	(Peru) Adrienn Kocsis	6–11, 2–11	(silver) Runner-up
1997	Argentina International	(Peru) Adrienn Kocsis	6–11, 1–11	(silver) Runner-up
1998	Brazil International	(England) Joanne Muggeridge	1–11, 0–11	(silver) Runner-up
2000	Brazil International	(Peru) Doriana Rivera	11–3, 11–0	(gold) Winner

Women's doubles
Year	Tournament	Partner	Opponent	Score	Result
1996	São Paulo Cup	(Peru) Doriana Rivera	(Brazil) Cristina Nakano (Brazil) Patricia Finardi	15–2, 15–10	(gold) Winner
1997	São Paulo Cup	(Peru) Pilar Bellido	(Brazil) Lais Ahnert (Brazil) Fernanda Kumasaka	15–5, 15–4	(gold) Winner
1997	Argentina International	(Peru) Pilar Bellido	(Chile) Natalia Villegas Norambuena (Chile) Pamela Macaya Salinas	15–2, 15–1	(gold) Winner
1997	Peru International	(Peru) Lorena Blanco	(Denmark) Pernille Harder (Sweden) Johanna Holgersson	6–15, 11–15	(silver) Runner-up
1998	Brazil International	(Peru) Adrienn Kocsis	(Mexico) Veronica Estrada (Mexico) Gabriela Melgoza	15–1, 15–6	(gold) Winner
1998	Argentina International	(Peru) Lorena Blanco	(Peru) Adrienn Kocsis (Peru) Doriana Rivera	15–10, 15–0	(gold) Winner
1999	Brazil International	(Peru) Lorena Blanco	(Canada) Milaine Cloutier (Canada) Robbyn Hermitage	5–15, 6–15	(silver) Runner-up
1999	Argentina International	(Peru) Lorena Blanco	(Peru) Sandra Jimeno (Peru) Doriana Rivera	15–11, 8–15, 4–15	(silver) Runner-up
1999	USA International	(Peru) Lorena Blanco	(Peru) Sandra Jimeno (Peru) Doriana Rivera	15–7, 9–15, 15–3	(gold) Winner
1999	Chile International	(Peru) Lorena Blanco	(Cuba) Edith Loza Capote (Cuba) Yesenia Leon Ruiz	14–17, 12–15	(silver) Runner-up
2000	Brazil International	(Peru) Doriana Rivera	(Mexico) Gabriella Rodriguez (Mexico) Laura Amaya	15–5, 15–4	(gold) Winner

Mixed doubles
Year	Tournament	Partner	Opponent	Score	Result
1996	São Paulo Cup	(Peru) Mario Carulla	(Peru) Federico Valdez (Peru) Doriana Rivera	Walkover	(gold) Winner
1997	São Paulo Cup	(Peru) Federico Valdez	(Peru) Mario Carulla (Peru) Adrienn Kocsis	0–15, 0–15	(silver) Runner-up
1997	Argentina International	(Peru) Juan Carlos Hintze	(Peru) Mario Carulla (Peru) Adrienn Kocsis	1–15, 11–15	(silver) Runner-up
1999	USA International	(Peru) Jose Antonio Iturriaga	(United States) Alex Liang (United States) Julie Yu	17–14, 15–10	(gold) Winner
1999	Chile International	(Peru) Jose Antonio Iturriaga	(Peru) Mario Carulla (Peru) Adrienn Kocsis	10–15, 9–15	(silver) Runner-up
