= Satomi Igawa =

Japanese badminton player

Personal information
- Born: 24 October 1978 (age 47) Ibaraki Prefecture, Japan
- Height: 1.83 m (6 ft 0 in)
- Weight: 77 kg (170 lb)

Sport
- Country: Japan
- Sport: Badminton

Women's doubles
- Highest ranking: 17
- BWF profile

Satomi Igawa (井川 里美, Igawa Satomi; born 24 October 1978 in Ibaraki) is a former Japanese badminton player who affiliated with Sanko Co, Ltd. Igawa competed at the 2000 Summer Olympics in Sydney, Australia in the women's doubles partnered with Hiroko Nagamine. Igawa started her badminton career when she was in grade 4 elementary school. She won the division two All Japan Junior Championships when she was in middle school. Before joining Sanko team, she was part of the NTT Tokyo team. Her best rank was in 17 position in the women's doubles event.

== Achievements ==
=== IBF International ===
Women's doubles

Year	Tournament	Partner	Opponent	Score	Result	Ref
2000	Chile International	(Japan) Hiroko Nagamine	(Canada) Denyse Julien (Canada) Charmaine Reid	15–10, 15–0	(gold) Winner	
2000	Peru International	(Japan) Hiroko Nagamine	(Canada) Denyse Julien (Canada) Charmaine Reid	15–6, 15–8	(gold) Winner	
2000	Dutch International	(Japan) Hiroko Nagamine	(Netherlands) Betty Krab (Netherlands) Ginny Severien	15–5, 15–8	(gold) Winner	
2000	Cuba International	(Japan) Hiroko Nagamine	(Japan) Naomi Murakami (Japan) Hiromi Yamada	15–12, 15–5	(gold) Winner	
