= Mateo Delmastro =

Argentine badminton player (born 2000)

Personal information
- Born: Mateo Benjamín Delmastro; 14 April 2000 (age 26) Bariloche, Río Negro, Argentina

Sport
- Country: Argentina
- Sport: Badminton

Men's singles & doubles
- Highest ranking: 623 (MS 12 March 2019); 561 (MD 17 March 2020); 985 (XD 30 August 2018)
- BWF profile
Medal record
Men's badminton
Representing Argentina
South American Championships
Bronze medal – third place	2019 Guayaquil	Mixed team

Mateo Benjamín Delmastro (born 14 April 2000) is an Argentine badminton player. He won his first senior international title at the 2016 Argentina International in the mixed doubles event partnered with Micaela Suárez at the age of 16. He represented his country at the 2018 Summer Youth Olympics in Buenos Aires, Argentina.

== Achievements ==
=== BWF International Challenge/Series (1 title, 3 runners-up) ===
Men's doubles
Year	Tournament	Partner	Opponent	Score	Result
2020	Peru Future Series	(Argentina) Santiago Otero	(Guatemala) Rubén Castellanos (Guatemala) Christopher Martínez	12–21, 12–21	(silver) Runner-up
2018	Argentina International	(Argentina) Federico Diaz	(Italy) Enrico Baroni (Italy) Giovanni Toti	20–22, 15–21	(silver) Runner-up
2016	Argentina International	(Argentina) Dino Delmastro	(Argentina) Javier de Paepe (Argentina) Martin Trejo	21–19, 18–21, 11–21	(silver) Runner-up

Mixed doubles
Year	Tournament	Partner	Opponent	Score	Result
2016	Argentina International	(Argentina) Micaela Suárez	(Argentina) Javier de Paepe (Argentina) Natalia Montiel	18–21, 23–21, 21–12	(gold) Winner

BWF International Challenge tournament
BWF International Series tournament
BWF Future Series tournament
