= Brazil International =

Badminton tournament in Brazil

The Brazil International is an international open badminton tournament in Brazil. It has been held since 1984. It is part of the BWF International Series.

== Past winners ==
| Year | Men's singles | Women's singles | Men's doubles | Women's doubles | Mixed doubles |
|---|---|---|---|---|---|
| 1984 | (Brazil) Luís Manuel Barreto | (Brazil) Huan Yeh Chui Mei | (Brazil) Ong Khing (Brazil) Chen Wen Hau | (Brazil) Huan Yeh Chui Mei (Brazil) Huang Kang Li Ping | (Brazil) Lou Yen Chuan (Brazil) Huan Yeh Chui Mei |
| 1985 | (Brazil) Luís Manuel Barreto | (Brazil) Ruth Dantith | (Brazil) Wang Chi Fong (Brazil) Michel Bex | No competition | |
| 1986 | No competition | | | | |
| 1987 | (Brazil) Ong Khing | (Brazil) Whang Hsiang | (Brazil) Ong Khing (Brazil) Joseph Lee | (Brazil) Márcia Oey (Brazil) Phily Han | No competition |
| 1988 | No competition | | | | |
| 1989 | (Brazil) Luís Manuel Barreto | (Brazil) Hao Min Huai | (Brazil) Johan Loo (Brazil) Wang Chi Fong | (Brazil) Angela S. Zumpano (Brazil) Hao Min Huai | No competition |
| 1990 | (Brazil) Bernardo Mayer | (Brazil) Sandra Miashiro | (Brazil) Johan Loo (Brazil) Wang Chi Fong | (Brazil) Lilian Mayer (Brazil) Samantha Tjio | No competition |
| 1991 | (Brazil) Leandro Santos | (Brazil) Sandra Miashiro | (Brazil) Paulo Fam (Brazil) Wang Chi Fong | (Brazil) Hao Min Huai (Brazil) Waldette Wahba | (Brazil) Leandro Santos (Brazil) Samantha Tjio |
| 1992 | (Brazil) Paulo Fam | (Brazil) Sandra Miashiro | (Brazil) Leandro Santos (Brazil) Wang Chi Fong | (Brazil) Hao Min Huai (Brazil) Sandra Miashiro | (Brazil) Paulo Fam (Brazil) Sandra Miashiro |
| 1993 | (Brazil) Leandro Santos | (Brazil) Patrícia Finardi | (Brazil) Huang Shuan (Brazil) Paulo Fam | (Brazil) Hao Min Huai (Brazil) Sandra Miashiro | (Brazil) Leandro Santos (Brazil) Patrícia Finardi |
| 1994 | (Peru) Mario Carulla | (Brazil) Cristina Nakano | (Peru) José Iturriaga (Peru) Mario Carulla | (Brazil) Cristina Nakano (Brazil) Patrícia Finardi | (Brazil) Leandro Santos (Brazil) Patrícia Finardi |
| 1995 | (Guatemala) Kenneth Erichsen | (Brazil) Cristina Nakano | (Brazil) Guilherme Kumasaka (Brazil) Paulo von Scala | (Brazil) Fernanda Kumasaka (Brazil) Sandra Miashiro | (Brazil) Leandro Santos (Brazil) Fernanda Kumasaka |
| 1996 | (Peru) Mario Carulla | (Peru) Ximena Bellido | (Peru) Federico Valdez (Peru) Mario Carulla | (Peru) Doriana Rivera (Peru) Ximena Bellido | (Peru) Mario Carulla (Peru) Ximena Bellido |
| 1997 | (Mexico) Luiz Lopezlero | (Hungary) Adrienn Kocsis | (Brazil) Guilherme Kumasaka (Brazil) Paulo von Scala | (Peru) Pilar Bellido (Peru) Ximena Bellido | (Peru) Mario Carulla (Hungary) Adrienn Kocsis |
| 1998 | (Wales) Richard Vaughan | (England) Jo Muggeridge | (United States) Dean Schoppe (United States) Matt Fogarty | (Hungary) Adrienn Kocsis (Peru) Ximena Bellido | (Suriname) Oscar Brandon (Hungary) Adrienn Kocsis |
| 1999 | (Hong Kong) Ng Wei | (Finland) Anu Weckström | (Hong Kong) Ma Che Kong (Hong Kong) Yau Kwun Yuen | (Canada) Robbyn Hermitage (Canada) Milaine Cloutier | (Canada) Michael Beres (Canada) Kara Solmundson |
| 2000 | (Netherlands) Tjitte Weistra | (Peru) Ximena Bellido | (United States) Dean Schoppe (United States) Matt Fogarty | (Peru) Doriana Rivera (Peru) Ximena Bellido | (Netherlands) Tjitte Weistra (Peru) Doriana Rivera |
| 2001 | (United States) Kevin Han | (Italy) Agnese Allegrini | (United States) Howard Bach (United States) Kevin Han | (Italy) Agnese Allegrini (Italy) Federica Panini | (Italy) Cristiano Bevilacqua (Italy) Agnese Allegrini |
| 2002 | (Spain) Arturo Ruiz López | (Peru) Lorena Blanco | (Spain) Nicolás Escartín (Spain) Arturo Ruiz López | (Peru) Sandra Jimeno (Peru) Doriana Rivera | (Peru) Rodrigo Pacheco (Peru) Lorena Blanco |
| 2003 | (Japan) Shōji Satō | (Japan) Miho Tanaka | (Spain) José Antonio Crespo (Spain) Sergio Llopis | (Canada) Helen Nichol (Canada) Charmaine Reid | (Spain) José Antonio Crespo (Spain) Dolores Marco |
| 2004 | (Japan) Yuichi Ikeda | (Austria) Simone Prutsch | (Wales) Matthew Hughes (Wales) Martyn Lewis | (United States) Jennifer Coleman (United States) Melinda Keszthelyi | (Spain) Carlos Longo (Spain) Laura Molina |
| 2005 | (Spain) Pablo Abián | (Canada) Charmaine Reid | (Wales) Matthew Hughes (Wales) Martyn Lewis | (Canada) Charmaine Reid (Canada) Helen Nichol | (Canada) Philippe Bourret (Canada) Helen Nichol |
| 2006 | (Indonesia) Andre Kurniawan Tedjono | (Indonesia) Maria Febe Kusumastuti | (Indonesia) Danny Bawa Chrisnanta (Indonesia) Afiat Yuris Wirawan | (Indonesia) Meiliana Jauhari (Indonesia) Purwati | (Indonesia) Afiat Yuris Wirawan (Indonesia) Purwati |
| 2007 | (United States) Eric Go | (Spain) Lucía Tavera | (Brazil) Lucas Araújo (Brazil) Paulo von Scala | (Peru) Jie Meng (Peru) Valeria Rivero | (Peru) Andres Corpancho (Peru) Valeria Rivero |
| 2008 | (Guatemala) Kevin Cordón | (Peru) Cristina Aicardi | (Peru) Andres Corpancho (Peru) Bruno Monteverde | (Peru) Cristina Aicardi (Peru) Alejandra Monteverde | (Peru) Bruno Monteverde (Peru) Claudia Zornoza |
| 2009 | (Peru) Andres Corpancho | (Peru) Cristina Aicardi | (Peru) Antonio de Vinatea (Peru) Martín del Valle | (Peru) Cristina Aicardi (Peru) Alejandra Monteverde | (Spain) Alejandro Barriga (Spain) Sandra Chirlaque |
| 2010 | (United States) Hock Lai Lee | (Indonesia) Ana Rovita | (Indonesia) Didit Juang Indrianto (Indonesia) Seiko Wahyu Kusdianto | (United States) Eva Lee (United States) Paula Lynn Obañana | (United States) Halim Haryanto (United States) Eva Lee |
| 2011 | (Poland) Przemysław Wacha | (Canada) Michelle Li | (Russia) Vladimir Ivanov (Russia) Ivan Sozonov | (United States) Eva Lee (United States) Paula Lynn Obañana | (United States) Halim Haryanto (United States) Eva Lee |
| 2012 | (Guatemala) Kevin Cordon | (Canada) Nicole Grether | (Malaysia) Gan Teik Chai (Malaysia) Ong Soon Hock | (Canada) Nicole Grether (Canada) Charmaine Reid | (United States) Phillip Chew (United States) Jamie Subandhi |
| 2013 | (Chinese Taipei) Yang Chih-hsun | (Canada) Michelle Li | (United States) Phillip Chew (United States) Sattawat Pongnairat | (Canada) Nicole Grether (Canada) Charmaine Reid | (United States) Phillip Chew (United States) Jamie Subandhi |
| 2014 | (Sweden) Henri Hurskainen | (United States) Iris Wang | (France) Bastian Kersaudy (France) Gaetan Mittelheisser | (Canada) Alex Bruce (Canada) Phyllis Chan | (France) Laurent Constantin (France) Laura Choinet |
| 2015 | (Brazil) Ygor Coelho | (Hungary) Laura Sarosi | (Mexico) Job Castillo (Mexico) Lino Muñoz | (Brazil) Lohaynny Vicente (Brazil) Luana Vicente | (Brazil) Hugo Arthuso (Brazil) Fabiana Silva |
| 2016 | (Portugal) Pedro Martins | (Turkey) Neslihan Yiğit | (Poland) Adam Cwalina (Poland) Przemysław Wacha | (Japan) Chisato Hoshi (Japan) Naru Shinoya | (Canada) Toby Ng (Canada) Alex Bruce |
| 2017 | (Sri Lanka) Niluka Karunaratne | (Japan) Haruko Suzuki | (Russia) Evgenij Dremin (Russia) Denis Grachev | (Brazil) Jaqueline Lima (Brazil) Sâmia Lima | (Brazil) Hugo Arthuso (Brazil) Fabiana Silva |
| 2018 | (Brazil) Ygor Coelho | (Canada) Rachel Honderich | (Canada) Jason Ho-Shue (Canada) Nyl Yakura | (Canada) Rachel Honderich (United States) Jamie Subandhi | (Russia) Evgenij Dremin (Russia) Evgenia Dimova |
| 2019 IC | (Israel) Misha Zilberman | (Belgium) Lianne Tan | (India) Satwiksairaj Rankireddy (India) Chirag Shetty | (Canada) Rachel Honderich (Canada) Kristen Tsai | (Netherlands) Robin Tabeling (Netherlands) Selena Piek |
| 2019 FS | (Brazil) Artur Pomoceno | (Brazil) Fabiana Silva | (Brazil) Fabrício Farias (Brazil) Francielton Farias | (Brazil) Jaqueline Lima (Brazil) Sâmia Lima | (Brazil) Fabrício Farias (Brazil) Jaqueline Lima |
| 2019 IS | (Guatemala) Kevin Cordón | (Brazil) Jaqueline Lima | (Brazil) Fabrício Farias (Brazil) Francielton Farias | (Brazil) Jaqueline Lima (Brazil) Sâmia Lima | (Brazil) Fabrício Farias (Brazil) Jaqueline Lima |
| 2020 | Cancelled (Note: This tournament, originally to be played from 14 to 18 October, was later cancelled due to the COVID-19 pandemic in Brazil.) | | | | |
| 2021 | (Brazil) Jonathan Matias | (Brazil) Juliana Viana Vieira | (Brazil) Fabrício Farias (Brazil) Francielton Farias | (Brazil) Jaqueline Lima (Brazil) Sâmia Lima | (Brazil) Fabrício Farias (Brazil) Jaqueline Lima |
| 2022 | (El Salvador) Uriel Canjura | (Brazil) Juliana Viana Vieira | (Brazil) Fabrício Farias (Brazil) Francielton Farias | (Brazil) Jaqueline Lima (Brazil) Sâmia Lima | (Guatemala) Jonathan Solís (Guatemala) Diana Corleto |
| 2023 | (Guatemala) Kevin Cordón | (Mauritius) Kate Ludik | (Algeria) Koceila Mammeri (Algeria) Youcef Sabri Medel | (Brazil) Jaqueline Lima (Brazil) Sâmia Lima | (Brazil) Davi Silva (Brazil) Sania Lima |
| 2024– 2025 | No competition | | | | |
| 2026 | (Brazil) Jonathan Matias | (Brazil) Juliana Viana Vieira | (Japan) Takuto Goto (Japan) Yuta Oku | (Brazil) Jaqueline Lima (Brazil) Sâmia Lima | (Brazil) Davi Silva (Brazil) Sania Lima |

== Performances by nation ==
As of the 2026 edition

| Pos | Nation | MS | WS | MD | WD | XD | Total |
|---|---|---|---|---|---|---|---|
| 1 | Brazil | 13 | 15 | 15 | 17 | 13 | 73 |
| 2 | Peru | 3 | 5 | 4 | 7.5 | 5 | 24.5 |
| 3 | Canada | | 5 | 1 | 7.5 | 3 | 16.5 |
| 4 | United States | 3 | 1 | 4 | 3.5 | 4 | 15.5 |
| 5 | Spain | 2 | 1 | 2 | | 3 | 8 |
| 6 | Indonesia | 1 | 2 | 2 | 1 | 1 | 7 |
| 7 | Guatemala | 5 | | | | 1 | 6 |
| 7 | Japan | 2 | 2 | 1 | 1 | | 6 |
| 9 | Hungary | | 2 | | 0.5 | 1 | 3.5 |
| 10 | Italy | | 1 | | 1 | 1 | 3 |
| 10 | Russia | | | 2 | | 1 | 3 |
| 10 | Wales | 1 | | 2 | | | 3 |
| 13 | Netherlands | 1 | | | | 1.5 | 2.5 |
| 14 | France | | | 1 | | 1 | 2 |
| 14 | Hong Kong | 1 | | 1 | | | 2 |
| 14 | Mexico | 1 | | 1 | | | 2 |
| 14 | Poland | 1 | | 1 | | | 2 |
| 18 | Algeria | | | 1 | | | 1 |
| 18 | Austria | | 1 | | | | 1 |
| 18 | Belgium | | 1 | | | | 1 |
| 18 | Chinese Taipei | 1 | | | | | 1 |
| 18 | England | | 1 | | | | 1 |
| 18 | El Salvador | 1 | | | | | 1 |
| 18 | Finland | | 1 | | | | 1 |
| 18 | India | | | 1 | | | 1 |
| 18 | Israel | 1 | | | | | 1 |
| 18 | Malaysia | | | 1 | | | 1 |
| 18 | Mauritius | | 1 | | | | 1 |
| 18 | Portugal | 1 | | | | | 1 |
| 18 | Sri Lanka | 1 | | | | | 1 |
| 18 | Sweden | 1 | | | | | 1 |
| 18 | Turkey | | 1 | | | | 1 |
| 33 | Suriname | | | | | 0.5 | 0.5 |
| Total | | 40 | 40 | 40 | 39 | 36 | 195 |
