= Fabiana Silva =

Brazilian badminton player

Personal information
- Born: Fabiana da Silva; 27 July 1988 (age 38) Niterói, Rio de Janeiro, Brazil
- Height: 1.53 m (5 ft 0 in)
- Weight: 50 kg (110 lb)

Sport
- Country: Brazil
- Sport: Badminton
- Coached by: Right

Women's singles & doubles
- Highest ranking: 54 (WS 23 October 2014); 39 (WD 19 March 2015); 51 (XD 25 September 2014)
- BWF profile
Medal record
Women's badminton
Representing Brazil
Pan American Games
Bronze medal – third place	2019 Lima	Women's doubles
Pan Am Championships
Silver medal – second place	2016 Campinas	Mixed team
Silver medal – second place	2017 Santo Domingo	Mixed team
Bronze medal – third place	2012 Lima	Women's doubles
Bronze medal – third place	2012 Lima	Mixed team
Bronze medal – third place	2013 Santo Domingo	Women's singles
Bronze medal – third place	2013 Santo Domingo	Mixed doubles
Bronze medal – third place	2013 Santo Domingo	Mixed team
Bronze medal – third place	2014 Markham	Women's singles
Bronze medal – third place	2014 Markham	Mixed team
Bronze medal – third place	2019 Lima	Mixed team
Pan Am Women's Team Championships
Bronze medal – third place	2020 Salvador	Women's team
South American Games
Gold medal – first place	2018 Cochabamba	Women's singles
Gold medal – first place	2018 Cochabamba	Mixed team
Silver medal – second place	2010 Medellín	Mixed team
Silver medal – second place	2018 Cochabamba	Women's doubles

Fabiana da Silva (born 27 July 1988) is a Brazilian badminton player. She was the women's singles champion at the 2018 South American Games. She also won the bronze medal in the women's doubles at the 2019 Pan American Games. Silva competed in the 2020 Tokyo Olympics.

== Achievements ==
=== Pan American Games ===
Women's doubles
Year	Venue	Partner	Opponent	Score	Result
2019	Polideportivo 3 Lima, Peru	(Brazil) Tamires Santos	(Canada) Rachel Honderich (Canada) Kristen Tsai	5–21, 8–21	Bronze

=== Pan Am Championships ===
Women's singles
Year	Venue	Opponent	Score	Result
2013	Palacio de los Deportes Virgilio Travieso Soto; Santo Domingo, Dominican Republic	(Canada) Michelle Li	18–21, 5–21	Bronze
2014	Markham Pan Am Centre; Markham, Canada	(Canada) Michelle Li	6–21, 12–21	Bronze

Women's doubles
Year	Venue	Partner	Opponent	Score	Result
2012	Manuel Bonilla Stadium; Lima, Peru	(Brazil) Paula Pereira	(Canada) Alex Bruce (Canada) Phyllis Chan	13–21, 9–21	Bronze

Mixed doubles
Year	Venue	Partner	Opponent	Score	Result
2013	Palacio de los Deportes Virgilio Travieso Soto; Santo Domingo, Dominican Republic	(Brazil) Hugo Arthuso	(Canada) Toby Ng (Canada) Alex Bruce	9–21, 14–21	Bronze

=== South American Games ===
Women's singles
Year	Venue	Opponent	Score	Result
2018	Evo Morales Coliseum; Cochabamba, Bolivia	(Peru) Daniela Macías	21–13, 22–20	Gold

Women's doubles
Year	Venue	Partner	Opponent	Score	Result
2018	Evo Morales Coliseum; Cochabamba, Bolivia	(Brazil) Luana Vicente	(Peru) Daniela Macías (Peru) Dánica Nishimura	20–22, 10–21	Silver

=== BWF International Challenge/Series (14 titles, 26 runner-up) ===
Women's singles
Year	Tournament	Opponent	Score	Result
2013	Internacional Mexicano	(Brazil) Lohaynny Vicente	21–18, 17–21, 12–21	(silver) Runner-up
2014	Venezuela International	(Brazil) Lohaynny Vicente	20–22, 22–24	(silver) Runner-up
2014	Puerto Rico International	(Puerto Rico) Génesis Valentín	21–6, 21–7	(gold) Winner
2015	Colombia International	(Italy) Jeanine Cicognini	15–21, 21–12, 13–21	(silver) Runner-up
2016	Guatemala International	(Brazil) Lohaynny Vicente	16–21, 21–14, 16–21	(silver) Runner-up
2017	Brazil International	(Japan) Haruko Suzuki	9–21, 6–21	(silver) Runner-up
2017	Mercosul International	(Brazil) Bianca Lima	21–10, 21–8	(gold) Winner
2018	Peru Future Series	(Peru) Daniela Macías	14–21, 21–16, 17–21	(silver) Runner-up
2018	Santo Domingo Open	(Cuba) Taymara Oropesa	21–19, 14–21, 21–13	(gold) Winner
2018	El Salvador International	(Peru) Daniela Macías	16–21, 14–21	(silver) Runner-up
2019	Brazil Future Series	(Brazil) Jaqueline Lima	21–11, 19–21, 21–18	(gold) Winner
2019	International Mexicano	(Indonesia) Ghaida Nurul Ghaniyu	19–21, 17–21	(silver) Runner-up
2019	Guatemala International	(Indonesia) Ghaida Nurul Ghaniyu	19–21, 13–21	(silver) Runner-up
2019	Santo Domingo Open	(United States) Ruhi Raju	21–13, 12–21, 21–13	(gold) Winner

Women's doubles
Year	Tournament	Partner	Opponent	Score	Result
2014	Mercosul International	(Brazil) Paula Pereira	(Brazil) Lohaynny Vicente (Brazil) Luana Vicente	11–21, 13–21	(silver) Runner-up
2014	Argentina International	(Brazil) Paula Pereira	(Brazil) Lohaynny Vicente (Brazil) Luana Vicente	21–18, 11–21, 15–21	(silver) Runner-up
2014	Venezuela International	(Brazil) Paula Pereira	(Brazil) Lohaynny Vicente (Brazil) Luana Vicente	13–21, 5–21	(silver) Runner-up
2014	Guatemala International	(Brazil) Paula Pereira	(United States) Eva Lee (United States) Paula Lynn Obañana	3–11, 3–11, 10–11	(silver) Runner-up
2014	Puerto Rico International	(Brazil) Ana Paula Campos	(Peru) Camilla García (Peru) Luz María Zornoza	21–18, 21–17	(gold) Winner
2015	Peru International Series	(Brazil) Paula Pereira	(Brazil) Lohaynny Vicente (Brazil) Luana Vicente	9–21, 17–21	(silver) Runner-up
2015	Chile International	(Brazil) Ana Paula Campos	(Brazil) Lohaynny Vicente (Brazil) Luana Vicente	18–21, 13–21	(silver) Runner-up
2015	Colombia International	(Brazil) Ana Paula Campos	(Mexico) Haramara Gaitán (Mexico) Sabrina Solis	21–18, 21–17	(gold) Winner
2015	Puerto Rico International	(Brazil) Ana Paula Campos	(Mexico) Haramara Gaitán (Mexico) Sabrina Solis	12–21, 15–21	(silver) Runner-up
2015	Suriname International	(Brazil) Ana Paula Campos	(Mexico) Haramara Gaitán (Mexico) Sabrina Solis	No match	(silver) Runner-up
2017	Mercosul International	(Brazil) Paula Pereira	(Guatemala) Diana Corleto (Guatemala) Mariana Paiz	21–14, 21–17	(gold) Winner
2024	Giraldilla International	(Cuba) Taymara Oropesa	(Guatemala) Diana Corleto (Guatemala) Mariana Paiz	15–21, 21–19, 10–21	(silver) Runner-up

Mixed doubles
Year	Tournament	Partner	Opponent	Score	Result
2011	Suriname International	(Brazil) Hugo Arthuso	(Suriname) Mitchel Wongsodikromo (Suriname) Crystal Leefmans	22–20, 21–18	(gold) Winner
2012	Brazil International	(Brazil) Hugo Arthuso	(United States) Phillip Chew (United States) Jamie Subandhi	19–21, 16–21	(silver) Runner-up
2013	Mercosul International	(Brazil) Hugo Arthuso	(Mexico) Lino Muñoz (Mexico) Cynthia González	16–21, 16–21	(silver) Runner-up
2013	Argentina International	(Brazil) Hugo Arthuso	(Mexico) Lino Muñoz (Mexico) Cynthia González	18–21, 21–9, 16–21	(silver) Runner-up
2013	Santo Domingo Open	(Brazil) Hugo Arthuso	(Brazil) Alex Tjong (Brazil) Lohaynny Vicente	9–21, 13–21	(silver) Runner-up
2013	Internacional Mexicano	(Brazil) Hugo Arthuso	(Brazil) Daniel Paiola (Brazil) Paula Pereira	21–13, 13–21, 19–21	(silver) Runner-up
2014	Mercosul International	(Brazil) Hugo Arthuso	(Denmark) Søren Toft Hansen (United States) Rong Schafer	21–23, 13–21	(silver) Runner-up
2014	Argentina International	(Brazil) Hugo Arthuso	(Brazil) Alex Tjong (Brazil) Lohaynny Vicente	19–21, 19–21	(silver) Runner-up
2015	Colombia International	(Brazil) Alex Tjong	(Peru) Daniel la Torre (Peru) Daniela Macías	21–19, 19–21, 21–14	(gold) Winner
2015	Brazil International	(Brazil) Hugo Arthuso	(Austria) David Obernosterer (Austria) Elisabeth Baldauf	21–15, 16–21, 21–19	(gold) Winner
2015	Puerto Rico International	(Brazil) Daniel Paiola	(Brazil) Alex Tjong (Brazil) Lohaynny Vicente	12–21, 21–18, 23–25	(silver) Runner-up
2017	Brazil International	(Brazil) Hugo Arthuso	(Germany) Jonathan Persson (Mauritius) Kate Foo Kune	21–11, 21–19	(gold) Winner
2017	Mercosul International	(Brazil) Artur Pomoceno	(Guatemala) Aníbal Marroquín (Guatemala) Mariana Paiz	19–21, 21–18, 23–21	(gold) Winner
2018	Peru International	(Brazil) Artur Pomoceno	(Cuba) Leodannis Martínez (Cuba) Taymara Oropesa	26–24, 15–21, 21–8	(gold) Winner

BWF International Challenge tournament
BWF International Series tournament
BWF Future Series tournament
