= Lohaynny Vicente =

Brazilian badminton player (born 1996)

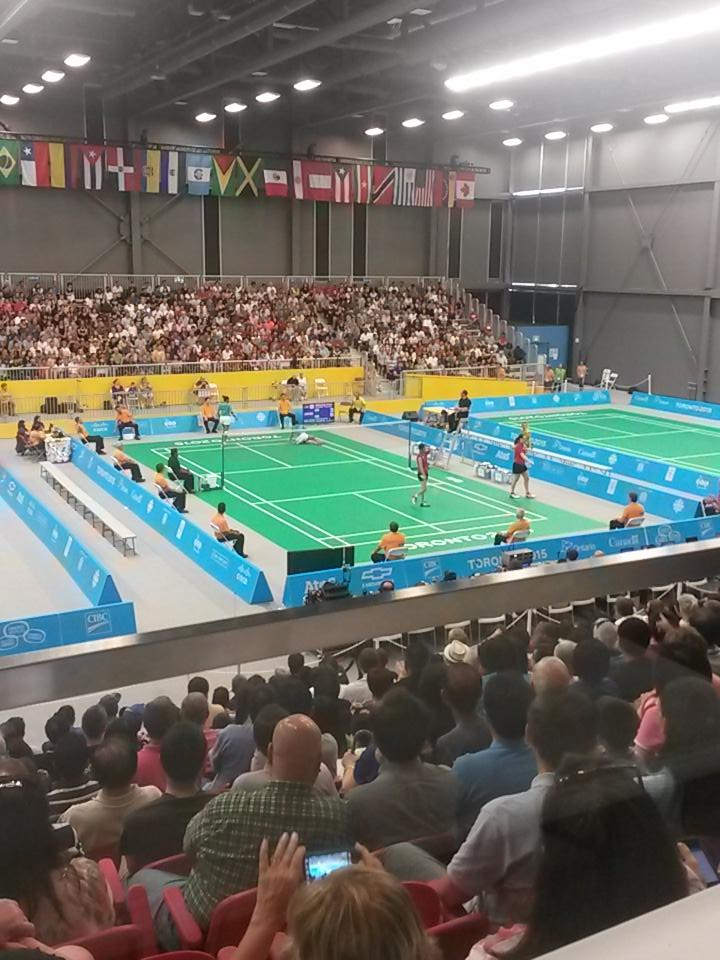

Personal information
- Born: Lohaynny Caroline de Oliveira Vicente; 2 May 1996 (age 30) Rio de Janeiro, Brazil
- Height: 1.67 m (5 ft 6 in)

Sport
- Country: Brazil
- Sport: Badminton
- Handedness: Right

Women's singles & doubles
- Highest ranking: 54 (WS 10 March 2016); 35 (WD 8 July 2016); 48 (XD 9 April 2015)
- BWF profile
Medal record
Women's badminton
Representing Brazil
Pan American Games
Silver medal – second place	2015 Toronto	Women's doubles
Bronze medal – third place	2015 Toronto	Mixed doubles
Pan Am Championships
Silver medal – second place	2014 Markham	Women's doubles
Pan Am Mixed Team Championships
Silver medal – second place	2016 Campinas	Mixed team
Bronze medal – third place	2013 Santo Domingo	Mixed team
Bronze medal – third place	2014 Markham	Mixed team
Bronze medal – third place	2019 Lima	Mixed team
Pan Am Female Cup
Bronze medal – third place	2024 São Paulo	Women's team

Lohaynny Caroline de Oliveira Vicente (born 2 May 1996) is a Brazilian badminton player who has qualified to compete at the 2016 Summer Olympics in her home city of Rio de Janeiro, Brazil.

== Personal life ==
Vicente was born on 2 May 1996 in Rio de Janeiro. Her older sister Luana Vicente is also an international badminton player. When Lohaynny was four years old and Luana was six, their father, a drug dealer, was killed in a shootout with police. Following her father's death her mother moved the family from the west of the city to Chacrinha, a favela in the north of Rio. She now lives with her sister in Campinas, São Paulo, in a house funded by the Brazilian Badminton Federation.

== Career ==
Both Vicente and her sister began playing badminton through a programme set up by a coach to teach the sport to children in the community.

At the 2014 Brazil International tournament, Vicente won a silver medal, losing to American Iris Wang in the final.

Vicente won a silver medal in the women's doubles at the 2015 Pan American Games held in Toronto, Ontario, Canada, playing alongside her sister Luana. The pair defeated Daigenis Saturria and Bermary Polanco of the Dominican Republic in the quarterfinals then Alex Bruce and Phyllis Chan of Canada in the semifinals. In the final they lost to the American pairing of Eva Lee and Paula Lynn Obañana by a score of 14−21, 6−21, to finish as runners-up. In the women's singles Vicente defeated Cuban Melissa Azcuy Perez then Chilean Tingting Chou before losing to eventual gold medallist Michelle Li by a score of 7–21, 8–21, in the quarterfinals.

Vicente was selected to compete for Brazil at the 2016 Summer Olympics in the women's singles as an automatic qualifier for the host nation.

== Achievements ==
=== Pan American Games ===
Women's doubles
Year	Venue	Partner	Opponent	Score	Result
2015	Atos Markham Pan Am Centre; Toronto, Ontario, Canada	(Brazil) Luana Vicente	(United States) Eva Lee (United States) Paula Lynn Obañana	14–21, 6–21	Silver

Mixed doubles
Year	Venue	Partner	Opponent	Score	Result
2015	Atos Markham Pan Am Centre; Toronto, Ontario, Canada	(Brazil) Alex Yuwan Tjong	(Canada) Toby Ng (Canada) Alex Bruce	17–21, 16–21	Bronze

=== Pan Am Championships ===
Women's doubles
Year	Venue	Partner	Opponent	Score	Result
2014	Markham Pan Am Centre; Markham, Canada	(Brazil) Luana Vicente	(United States) Eva Lee (United States) Paula Lynn Obañana	21–23, 14–21	Silver

=== BWF International Challenge/Series (25 titles, 10 runner-up) ===
Women's singles
Year	Tournament	Opponent	Score	Result
2011	Carebaco International	(Brazil) Luana Vicente	21–15, 21–18	(gold) Winner
2013	Mercosul International	(Slovenia) Maja Tvrdy	11–21, 13–21	(silver) Runner-up
2013	Argentina International	(Mexico) Cynthia González	21–12, 21–4	(gold) Winner
2013	Brazil International	(Canada) Michelle Li	21–16, 15–21, 8–21	(silver) Runner-up
2013	Santo Domingo Open	(United States) Iris Wang	18–21, 6–21	(silver) Runner-up
2013	Internacional Mexicano	(Brazil) Fabiana Silva	18–21, 21–17, 21–12	(gold) Winner
2013	Puerto Rico International	(Poland) Aleksandra Wałaszek	19–21, 21–13, 21–18	(gold) Winner
2014	Venezuela International	(Brazil) Fabiana Silva	22–20, 24–22	(gold) Winner
2014	Brazil International	(United States) Iris Wang	5–11, 9–11, 7–11	(silver) Runner-up
2015	Mercosul International	(United States) Rong Schafer	21–17, 13–21, 15–21	(silver) Runner-up
2015	Chile International	(Hungary) Laura Sárosi	13–21, 21–9, 12–21	(silver) Runner-up
2015	Argentina International	(Austria) Elisabeth Baldauf	17–21, 6–14 retired	(silver) Runner-up
2015	Suriname International	(Portugal) Telma Santos	No match	(silver) Runner-up
2016	Guatemala International	(Brazil) Fabiana Silva	21–16, 14–21, 21–16	(gold) Winner

Women's doubles
Year	Tournament	Partner	Opponent	Score	Result
2011	Carebaco International	(Brazil) Luana Vicente	(Barbados) Mariama Eastmond (Barbados) Shari Watson	21–16, 21–11	(gold) Winner
2011	Miami International	(Brazil) Luana Vicente	(United States) Dayanis Alvarez (United States) Shannon Pohl	21–9, 21–16	(gold) Winner
2011	Internacional Mexicano	(Brazil) Luana Vicente	(Mexico) Cynthia González (Mexico) Victoria Montero	21–10, 21–19	(gold) Winner
2013	Mercosul International	(Brazil) Paula Pereira	(Chile) Tingting Chou (Chile) Camila Macaya	21–10, 21–12	(gold) Winner
2013	Argentina International	(Brazil) Paula Pereira	(Peru) Daniela Macías (Peru) Luz María Zornoza	21–11, 21–11	(gold) Winner
2013	Santo Domingo Open	(Brazil) Paula Pereira	(Brazil) Ana Paula Campos (Brazil) Yasmin Cury	21–14, 21–9	(gold) Winner
2013	USA International	(Brazil) Paula Pereira	(United States) Hong Jingyu (United States) Beiwen Zhang	7–21, 14–21	(silver) Runner-up
2013	Internacional Mexicano	(Brazil) Paula Pereira	(Mexico) Cynthia González (Mexico) Victoria Montero	21–18, 17–21, 21–11	(gold) Winner
2013	Puerto Rico International	(Brazil) Paula Pereira	(Brazil) Ana Paula Campos (Brazil) Yasmin Cury	21–10, 21–12	(gold) Winner
2014	Mercosul International	(Brazil) Luana Vicente	(Brazil) Paula Pereira (Brazil) Fabiana Silva	21–11, 21–13	(gold) Winner
2014	Argentina International	(Brazil) Luana Vicente	(Brazil) Paula Pereira (Brazil) Fabiana Silva	18–21, 21–11, 21–15	(gold) Winner
2014	Venezuela International	(Brazil) Luana Vicente	(Brazil) Paula Pereira (Brazil) Fabiana Silva	21–13, 21–5	(gold) Winner
2015	Peru International Series	(Brazil) Luana Vicente	(Brazil) Paula Pereira (Brazil) Fabiana Silva	21–9, 21–17	(gold) Winner
2015	Chile International	(Brazil) Luana Vicente	(Brazil) Paula Pereira (Brazil) Fabiana Silva	21–18, 21–15	(gold) Winner
2015	Internacional Mexicano	(Brazil) Luana Vicente	(Mexico) Cynthia González (Mexico) Mariana Ugalde	21–8, 21–17	(gold) Winner
2015	Chile International Challenge	(Brazil) Luana Vicente	(United States) Eva Lee (United States) Paula Lynn Obañana	17–21, 16–21	(silver) Runner-up
2018	International Mexicano	(Brazil) Luana Vicente	(Peru) Daniela Macías (Peru) Dánica Nishimura	23–25, 21–16, 21–11	(gold) Winner
2018	Santo Domingo Open	(Brazil) Luana Vicente	(Guatemala) Diana Corleto (Guatemala) Nikté Sotomayor	22–20, 21–17	(gold) Winner

Mixed doubles
Year	Tournament	Partner	Opponent	Score	Result
2013	Santo Domingo Open	(Brazil) Alex Yuwan Tjong	(Brazil) Hugo Arthuso (Brazil) Fabiana Silva	21–9, 21–13	(gold) Winner
2014	Argentina International	(Brazil) Alex Yuwan Tjong	(Brazil) Hugo Arthuso (Brazil) Fabiana Silva	21–19, 21–19	(gold) Winner
2019	Jamaica International	(Brazil) Artur Pomoceno	(United States) Vinson Chiu (United States) Breanna Chi	21–17, 14–21, 21–19	(gold) Winner

BWF International Challenge tournament
BWF International Series tournament
BWF Future Series tournament
