= Camila Macaya =

Chilean badminton player (born 1990)

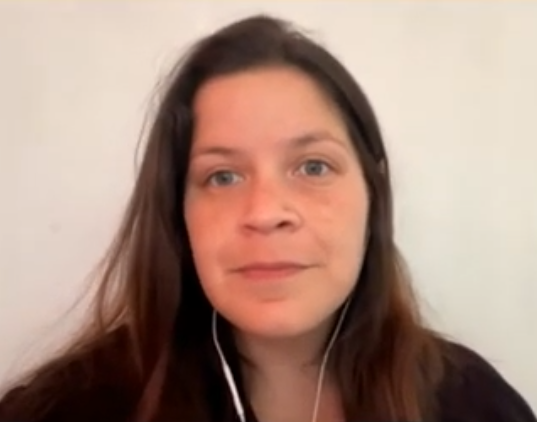

Personal information
- Born: Camila Paz Macaya; 3 September 1990 (age 36)
- Height: 1.63 m (5 ft 4 in)
- Weight: 63 kg (139 lb)

Sport
- Country: Chile
- Sport: Badminton

Women's singles & doubles
- Highest ranking: 222 (WS 24 October 2013); 122 (WD 22 March 2012); 124 (XD 29 September 2011)
- BWF profile

Camila Paz Macaya (born 3 September 1990) is a Chilean badminton player. She competed at the 2011 and 2015 Pan American Games. She was the champion at the 2016 Chile International tournament in the mixed doubles event.

== Achievements ==
=== BWF International Challenge/Series ===
Women's singles
Year	Tournament	Opponent	Score	Result
2012	Venezuela International	(Trinidad and Tobago) Solángel Guzmán	11–21, 8–21	(silver) Runner-up
2012	Argentina International	(Chile) Chou Ting Ting	15–21, 12–21	(silver) Runner-up

Women's doubles
Year	Tournament	Partner	Opponent	Score	Result
2012	Venezuela International	(Chile) Chou Ting Ting	(Trinidad and Tobago) Virginia Chariandy (Trinidad and Tobago) Solángel Guzmán	21–15, 17–21, 17–21	(silver) Runner-up
2012	Argentina International	(Chile) Chou Ting Ting	(Argentina) Daiana Garmendia (Argentina) Celina Juarez	21–9, 21–6	(gold) Winner
2013	Mercosul International	(Chile) Chou Ting Ting	(Brazil) Paula Pereira (Brazil) Lohaynny Vicente	10–21, 12–21	(silver) Runner-up

Mixed doubles
Year	Tournament	Partner	Opponent	Score	Result
2016	Argentina International	(Chile) Cristian Araya	(Chile) Esteban Mujica (Chile) Chou Ting Ting	18–21, 21–17, 18–21	(silver) Runner-up
2016	Chile International	(Chile) Iván León	(Chile) Alonso Medel (Chile) Mickaela Skaric	21–7, 18–21, 21–13	(gold) Winner

BWF International Challenge tournament
BWF International Series tournament
BWF Future Series tournament
