= Luz María Zornoza =

Peruvian badminton player

Personal information
- Born: Luz María Zornoza Roca Rey; 15 October 1994 (age 32)
- Height: 1.82 m (6 ft 0 in)
- Weight: 64 kg (141 lb)

Sport
- Country: Peru
- Sport: Badminton
- Handedness: Right

Women's singles & doubles
- Highest ranking: 96 (WS 8 January 2015); 50 (WD 12 March 2015); 42 (XD 2 April 2015)
- BWF profile
Medal record
Women's badminton
Representing Peru
Pan Am Championships
Silver medal – second place	2016 Campinas	Women's doubles
Bronze medal – third place	2014 Markham	Mixed doubles
Bronze medal – third place	2016 Campinas	Mixed doubles
Bronze medal – third place	2016 Campinas	Mixed team

Luz María Zornoza Roca Rey (born 15 October 1994) is a Peruvian badminton player. She competed at the 2015 Pan American Games.

== Career ==
In 2016, Zornoza won a silver medal at the Pan Am Badminton Championships in the women's doubles, and bronze medals in mixed doubles and team events.

== Achievements ==
=== Pan Am Championships ===
Women's doubles
Year	Venue	Partner	Opponent	Score	Result
2016	Clube Fonte São Paulo; Campinas, Brazil	(Peru) Paula la Torre	(Canada) Michelle Tong (Canada) Josephine Wu	17–21, 17–21	Silver

Mixed doubles
Year	Venue	Partner	Opponent	Score	Result
2014	Markham Pan Am Centre; Markham, Canada	(Peru) Andrés Corpancho	(Canada) Toby Ng (Canada) Alex Bruce	21–16, 12–21, 13–21	Bronze
2016	Clube Fonte São Paulo; Campinas, Brazil	(Peru) Diego Mini	(Canada) Nathan Osborne (Canada) Josephine Wu	22–24, 16–21	Bronze

=== BWF International Challenge/Series ===
Women's singles
Year	Tournament	Opponent	Score	Result
2014	Chile International	(United States) Rong Schafer	5–11, 9–11, 10–11	(silver) Runner-up

Women's doubles
Year	Tournament	Partner	Opponent	Score	Result
2011	Colombia International	(Puerto Rico) Daneysha Santana	(Peru) Daniela Macías (Peru) Dánica Nishimura	21–12, 21–12	(gold) Winner
2012	Giraldilla International	(Peru) Daniela Macías	(Cuba) Mislenis Chaviano (Cuba) Maria L. Hernández	16–21, 21–19, 21–14	(gold) Winner
2013	Giraldilla International	(Peru) Daniela Macías	(Peru) Camilla García (Peru) Dánica Nishimura	21–17, 18–21, 20–22	(silver) Runner-up
2013	Argentina International	(Peru) Daniela Macías	(Brazil) Paula Pereira (Brazil) Lohaynny Vicente	11–21, 11–21	(silver) Runner-up
2014	Giraldilla International	(Peru) Dánica Nishimura	(Peru) Camilla García (Peru) Daniela Zapata	21–15, 21–17	(gold) Winner
2014	Chile International	(Peru) Katherine Winder	(Brazil) Ana Paula Campos (Peru) Camila Duany	11–2, 11–8, 11–3	(gold) Winner
2014	Colombia International	(Peru) Katherine Winder	(Peru) Daniela Macías (Peru) Dánica Nishimura	11–6, 11–10, 11–6	(gold) Winner
2014	Suriname International	(Peru) Katherine Winder	(Peru) Daniela Macías (Peru) Dánica Nishimura	21–13, 21–14	(gold) Winner
2014	Puerto Rico International	(Peru) Camilla García	(Brazil) Ana Paula Campos (Brazil) Fabiana Silva	18–21, 17–21	(silver) Runner-up
2015	Santo Domingo Open	(Peru) Katherine Winder	(Dominican Republic) Nairoby Jiménez (Dominican Republic) Licelott Sánchez	21–15, 21–6	(gold) Winner
2016	Giraldilla International	(Peru) Daniela Macías	(Cuba) Yuvisleydis Ramirez Chapman (Cuba) Adaivis Robinson Garcia	21–3, 21–6	(gold) Winner

Mixed doubles
Year	Tournament	Partner	Opponent	Score	Result
2014	Giraldilla International	(Peru) Andrés Corpancho	(Cuba) Osleni Guerrero (Cuba) Tahimara Oropeza	16–21, 15–21	(silver) Runner-up
2014	Chile International	(Peru) Andrés Corpancho	(Peru) Mario Cuba (Peru) Katherine Winder	3–11, 11–8, 10–11, 10–11	(silver) Runner-up
2014	Colombia International	(Peru) Andrés Corpancho	(Peru) Mario Cuba (Peru) Katherine Winder	11–10, 5–11, 11–7, 5–11, 11–10	(gold) Winner
2014	Suriname International	(Peru) Andrés Corpancho	(Peru) Mario Cuba (Peru) Katherine Winder	12–21, 8–21	(silver) Runner-up
2014	Puerto Rico International	(Peru) Andrés Corpancho	(Dominican Republic) Nelson Javier (Dominican Republic) Berónica Vibieca	21–19, 21–16	(gold) Winner
2015	Peru International Series	(Peru) Andrés Corpancho	(Peru) Mario Cuba (Peru) Katherine Winder	13–21, 13–21	(silver) Runner-up
2016	Peru International Series	(Peru) Diego Mini	(Peru) Mario Cuba (Peru) Katherine Winder	21–23, 12–21	(silver) Runner-up

BWF International Challenge tournament
BWF International Series tournament
BWF Future Series tournament
