= Mercosul International =

Brazilian open international badminton tournament

The Mercosur International or Mercosur Internacional is an open international badminton tournament in Brazil. The tournament established since June, 2013. The tournament has been an International Series level since 2013, then in 2015 categorized as International Challenge by the Badminton World Federation.

== Previous Winners ==
Year	Men's singles	Women's singles	Men's doubles	Women's doubles	Mixed doubles
2013	(Czech Republic) Jan Fröhlich	(Slovenia) Maja Tvrdy	(Brazil) Hugo Arthuso (Brazil) Alex Tjong	(Brazil) Paula Pereira (Brazil) Lohaynny Vicente	(Mexico) Lino Muñoz (Mexico) Cynthia González
2014	(Guatemala) Kevin Cordón	(United States) Iris Wang	(Guatemala) Humblers Heymard (Guatemala) Anibal Marroquin	(Brazil) Lohaynny Vicente (Brazil) Luana Vicente	(Denmark) Søren Toft (United States) Bo Rong
2015	(Guatemala) Kevin Cordón	(United States) Rong Schafer	(Belgium) Matijs Dierickx (Belgium) Freek Golinski	(Turkey) Özge Bayrak (Turkey) Neslihan Yiğit	(United States) Phillip Chew (United States) Jamie Subandhi
2016	no competition				
2017	(Mexico) Luis Ramon Garrido	(Brazil) Fabiana Silva	(Guatemala) Solis Jonathan (Guatemala) Rodolfo Ramirez	(Brazil) Paula Pereira (Brazil) Fabiana Silva	(Brazil) Artur Pomoceno (Brazil) Fabiana Silva
2018	cancelled				
