= Chou Ting Ting =

Chilean badminton player (born 1987)

Personal information
- Born: 7 November 1987 (age 39)

Sport
- Country: Chile
- Sport: Badminton

Women's
- Highest ranking: 226 (WS) 27 Sep 2012; 150 (WD) 28 Jan 2016; 218 (XD) 20 Aug 2015
- BWF profile
Medal record
Women's badminton
Representing Chile
South American Games
Bronze medal – third place	2010 Medellin	Women's doubles

Cecilia Chou Ting Ting (born 7 November 1987) is a Chilean female badminton player.

== Achievements ==
=== BWF International Challenge/Series ===
Women's Singles
Year	Tournament	Opponent	Score	Result
2012	Argentina International	(Chile) Camila Macaya	21-15, 21–12	(gold) Winner

Women's Doubles
Year	Tournament	Partner	Opponent	Score	Result
2013	Mercosul International	(Chile) Camila Macaya	(Brazil) Paula Pereira (Brazil) Lohaynny Vicente	10-21, 12–21	(silver) Runner-up
2012	Argentina International	(Chile) Camila Macaya	(Argentina) Daiana Garmendia (Argentina) Celina Juarez	21-9, 21–6	(gold) Winner
2012	Venezuela International	(Chile) Camila Macaya	(Trinidad and Tobago) Virginia Chariandy (Trinidad and Tobago) Solangel Guzman	21-15, 17–21, 17–21	(silver) Runner-up

Mixed Doubles
Year	Tournament	Partner	Opponent	Score	Result
2012	Argentina International	(Chile) Esteban Mujica	(Chile) Cristian Araya (Chile) Camila Macaya	21-18, 17–21, 21–18	(gold) Winner

BWF International Challenge tournament
BWF International Series tournament
BWF Future Series tournament
