= Paula Beatriz Pereira =

Brazilian badminton player (born 1988)

Paula Pereira
Personal information
- Born: Paula Beatriz Pereira; 11 March 1988 (age 38) Rio de Janeiro, Brazil
- Height: 1.71 m (5 ft 7 in)
- Weight: 58 kg (128 lb)

Sport
- Country: Brazil
- Sport: Badminton
- Coached by: Right

Women's
- Highest ranking: 260 (WS) 18 October 2012; 39 (WD) 19 March 2015; 53 (XD) 2 October 2014
- BWF profile
Medal record
Badminton
Representing Brazil
Pan Am Championships
Silver medal – second place	2016 Campinas	Mixed team
Bronze medal – third place	2014 Markham	Mixed team
Bronze medal – third place	2013 Santo Domingo	Mixed doubles
Bronze medal – third place	2013 Santo Domingo	Mixed team
Bronze medal – third place	2012 Lima	Women's doubles
Bronze medal – third place	2012 Lima	Mixed team
South American Games
Silver medal – second place	2010 Medellín	Mixed team

Paula Beatriz Pereira (born 11 March 1988) is a Brazilian female badminton player. She competed at the 2007 and 2015 Pan American Games. At the Brazilian National Badminton Championships, she won the women's singles title in 2011; women's doubles title in 2006, 2007, 2008, 2009, 2012, and 2014; and in the mixed doubles title in 2012.

== Achievements ==
=== Pan Am Championships ===
Women's doubles
Year	Venue	Partner	Opponent	Score	Result
2012	Manuel Bonilla Stadium; Lima, Peru	(Brazil) Fabiana Silva	(Canada) Alexandra Bruce (Canada) Phyllis Chan	13–21, 9–21	Bronze

Mixed doubles
Year	Venue	Partner	Opponent	Score	Result
2013	Palacio de los Deportes Virgilio Travieso Soto; Santo Domingo, Dominican Republic	(Brazil) Daniel Paiola	(United States) Howard Shu (United States) Eva Lee	8–21, 12–21	Bronze

=== BWF International Challenge/Series ===
Women's doubles
Year	Tournament	Partner	Opponent	Score	Result
2017	Mercosul International	(Brazil) Fabiana Silva	(Guatemala) Diana Corleto (Guatemala) Mariana Paiz	21–14, 21–17	(gold) Winner
2015	Peru International Series	(Brazil) Fabiana Silva	(Brazil) Lohaynny Vicente (Brazil) Luana Vicente	9–21, 17–21	(silver) Runner-up
2014	Guatemala International	(Brazil) Fabiana Silva	(United States) Eva Lee (United States) Paula Lynn Obanana	3–11, 3–11, 10–11	(silver) Runner-up
2014	Venezuela International	(Brazil) Fabiana Silva	(Brazil) Lohaynny Vicente (Brazil) Luana Vicente	13–21, 5–21	(silver) Runner-up
2014	Argentina International	(Brazil) Fabiana Silva	(Brazil) Lohaynny Vicente (Brazil) Luana Vicente	21–18, 11–21, 15–21	(silver) Runner-up
2014	Mercosul International	(Brazil) Fabiana Silva	(Brazil) Lohaynny Vicente (Brazil) Luana Vicente	11–21, 13–21	(silver) Runner-up
2013	Puerto Rico International	(Brazil) Lohaynny Vicente	(Brazil) Ana Paula Campos (Brazil) Yasmin Cury	21–10, 21–12	(gold) Winner
2013	Internacional Mexicano	(Brazil) Lohaynny Vicente	(Mexico) Cynthia González (Mexico) Victoria Montero	21–18, 17–21, 21–11	(gold) Winner
2013	USA International	(Brazil) Lohaynny Vicente	(United States) Jing Yu Hong (United States) Beiwen Zhang	7–21, 14–21	(silver) Runner-up
2013	Santo Domingo Open	(Brazil) Lohaynny Vicente	(Brazil) Ana Paula Campos (Brazil) Yasmin Cury	21–14, 21–9	(gold) Winner
2013	Argentina International	(Brazil) Lohaynny Vicente	(Peru) Daniela Macias (Peru) Luz Maria Zornoza	21–11, 21–11	(gold) Winner
2013	Mercosul International	(Brazil) Lohaynny Vicente	(Chile) Tingting Chou (Chile) Camila Macaya	21–10, 21–12	(gold) Winner
2007	Carebaco International	(Brazil) Thayse Cruz	(Suriname) Jill Sjauw Mook (Suriname) Mireille van Daal	21–13, 21–19	(gold) Winner

Mixed doubles
Year	Tournament	Partner	Opponent	Score	Result
2013	Internacional Mexicano	(Brazil) Daniel Paiola	(Brazil) Hugo Arthuso (Brazil) Fabiana Silva	13–21, 21–13, 21–19	(gold) Winner

BWF International Challenge tournament
BWF International Series tournament
BWF Future Series tournament
