= Chile International =

Badminton tournament in Chile

The Chile International is an open international badminton tournament in Chile. The tournament has been classified as an International Series event. In 2014, the tournament implemented an experimental scoring system: best of five games, each played to 11 points, without a tiebreaker. In 2015, the Federación Deportiva Nacional de Badminton de Chile hosted two level 4 BWF events: the International Challenge and the International Series.

== Previous Winners ==
Year	Men's singles	Women's singles	Men's doubles	Women's doubles	Mixed doubles
1999	(Wales) Richard Vaughan	(England) Joanne Muggeridge	(Peru) Mario Carulla (Peru) José Antonio Iturriaga	(Cuba) Yesenia Leon Ruiz (Cuba) Edith Loza	(Peru) Mario Carulla (Peru) Adrienn Kocsis
2000	(Peru) Mario Carulla	(Japan) Takako Ida	(Hong Kong) Ma Che Kong (Hong Kong) Yau Tsz Yuk	(Japan) Satomi Igawa (Japan) Hiroko Nagamine	(Canada) Mike Beres (Canada) Kara Solmundson
2001	(Netherlands) Tjitte Weistra	(Peru) Lorena Blanco	(Netherlands) Tjitte Weistra (Peru) José Antonio Iturriaga	(England) Joanne Muggeridge (England) Felicity Gallup	(Netherlands) Tjitte Weistra (Peru) Doriana Rivera
2002– 2013	no competition				
2014	(Guatemala) Kevin Cordón	(United States) Bo Rong	(France) Arnaud Génin (United States) Bjorn Seguin	(Peru) Katherine Winder (Peru) Luz María Zornoza	(Peru) Mario Cuba (Peru) Katherine Winder
2015 IS	(Cuba) Osleni Guerrero	(Hungary) Laura Sárosi	(Mexico) Job Castillo (Mexico) Lino Muñoz	(Brazil) Lohaynny Vicente (Brazil) Luana Vicente	(Peru) Mario Cuba (Peru) Katherine Winder
2015 IC	(Spain) Pablo Abián	(Turkey) Özge Bayrak	(Canada) Adrian Liu (Canada) Derrick Ng	(United States) Eva Lee (United States) Paula Lynn Obañana	(United States) Phillip Chew (United States) Jamie Subandhi
2016 IS	(Cuba) Osleni Guerrero	(Turkey) Özge Bayrak	(Chile) Diego Castillo (Chile) Alonso Medel	no competition	(Chile) Iván León (Chile) Camila Macaya
2017– 2019	no competition				
2020 FS	Cancelled (Note: This tournament, originally to be played from 8 to 11 October, was later postponed due to COVID-19 pandemic in Chile.)				
2021 FS	Cancelled (Note: This tournament, originally to be played from 5 to 10 October, was later postponed due to COVID-19 pandemic in Chile.)				
2022	no competition				
2023	(Italy) Fabio Caponio	(Italy) Yasmine Hamza	(England) Kelvin Ho (Jamaica) Samuel Ricketts	(Peru) Estefania Canchanya (Peru) Valeria Chuquimaqui	(Jamaica) Samuel Ricketts (Jamaica) Tahlia Richardson
2024	No competition				

== Performances by nation ==
As of the 2023 edition

Top Nations
Pos	Nation	MS	WS	MD	WD	XD	Total
1	Peru	1	1	1,5	2	3,5	9
2	United States		1	0,5	1	1	3,5
3	Cuba	2			1		3
4	England		1	0,5	1		2,5
5	Canada			1		1	2
5	Chile			1		1	2
5	Italy	1	1				2
5	Japan		1		1		2
5	Netherlands	1		0,5		0,5	2
5	Turkey		2				2
11	Jamaica			0,5		1	1,5
12	Brazil				1		1
12	Guatemala	1					1
12	Hong Kong			1			1
12	Hungary		1				1
12	Mexico			1			1
12	Spain	1					1
12	Wales	1					1
19	France			0,5			0,5
Total		8	8	8	7	8	39
