= Esteban Mujica =

Chilean badminton player (born 1985)

Personal information
- Born: Esteban Andres Mujica Peralta; 24 February 1985 (age 41) Antofagasta, Chile

Sport
- Country: Chile
- Sport: Badminton

Men's singles & doubles
- Highest ranking: 350 (MS 20 October 2011); 119 (MD 13 September 2012); 170 (XD 29 September 2011)
- BWF profile

Esteban Andres Mujica Peralta (born 24 February 1985) is a Chilean badminton player. He competed at the 2007 and 2011 Pan American Games.

== Achievements ==
=== BWF International Challenge/Series ===
Men's doubles
Year	Tournament	Partner	Opponent	Score	Result
2012	Argentina International	(Chile) Cristian Araya	(Malaysia) Gan Teik Chai (Malaysia) Ong Soon Hock	14–21, 15–21	(silver) Runner-up

Mixed doubles
Year	Tournament	Partner	Opponent	Score	Result
2012	Argentina International	(Chile) Chou Ting Ting	(Chile) Cristian Araya (Chile) Camila Macaya	21–18, 17–21, 21–18	(gold) Winner

BWF International Challenge tournament
BWF International Series tournament
BWF Future Series tournament
