= Venezuela International =

Badminton tournament in Venezuela

The Venezuela International is an open international badminton tournament held in Venezuela. This tournament organized by the Venezuela Badminton Federation (Federación Venezolana de Badminton) and Badminton Pan Am.

== Previous winners ==
=== Venezuela International ===
Year	Men's singles	Women's singles	Men's doubles	Women's doubles	Mixed doubles
2012	(Cuba) Osleni Guerrero	(Trinidad and Tobago) Solángel Guzmán	(Cuba) Osleni Guerrero (Cuba) Ronald Toledo	(Trinidad and Tobago) Virginia Chariandy (Trinidad and Tobago) Solángel Guzmán	(Trinidad and Tobago) Rahul Rampersad (Trinidad and Tobago) Solángel Guzmán
2013	(Cuba) Osleni Guerrero	(Trinidad and Tobago) Solángel Guzmán	(Guatemala) Humblers Heymard (Guatemala) Anibal Marroquin	(Guatemala) Ana de León (Guatemala) Nikte Sotomayor	(Guatemala) Humblers Heymard (Guatemala) Nikte Sotomayor
2014	(Cuba) Osleni Guerrero	(Brazil) Lohaynny Vicente	(Brazil) Hugo Arthuso (Brazil) Daniel Paiola	(Brazil) Lohaynny Vicente (Brazil) Luana Vicente	(Czech Republic) Milan Ludík (United States) Bo Rong
2015– 2022	No competition				
2023	(Italy) Giovanni Toti	(Peru) Inés Castillo	(Mexico) Job Castillo (Mexico) Luis Montoya	(Mexico) Romina Fregoso (Mexico) Miriam Rodríguez	(Mexico) Luis Montoya (Mexico) Miriam Rodríguez
2024	Cancelled (Note: This tournament, originally to be played on 22–26 October, was later cancelled.)				
2025	(Sri Lanka) Dumindu Abeywickrama	(Peru) Inés Castillo	(Cuba) Juan Carlos Bencomo Otaño (Cuba) Roberto Carlos Herrera Vazquez	(Cuba) Leyanis Contreras (Cuba) Taymara Oropesa	(Cuba) Roberto Carlos Herrera Vazquez (Cuba) Taymara Oropesa
2026	Cancelled				

=== Venezuela Future Series ===
Year	Men's singles	Women's singles	Men's doubles	Women's doubles	Mixed doubles
2022	Cancelled (Note: This tournament, originally to be played on 21–25 September, was later cancelled due to the COVID-19 pandemic in Venezuela.)				
2023	No competition				
2024	(Peru) Adriano Viale	(Brazil) Maria Clara Lima	(El Salvador) Javier Alas (Venezuela) Joiser Calanche	(Brazil) Maria Clara Lima (Brazil) Maria Nascimento	(Trinidad and Tobago) Reece Marcano (Trinidad and Tobago) Chequeda De Boulet
2025	(England) Rohan Thool	(Mexico) Vanessa García	(Brazil) Vinicius Eberling (Brazil) Gabriel Zink	(Brazil) Daiane Carvalho (Brazil) Maria Nascimento	(Mexico) Maximiliano Peregrina (Mexico) Miriam Rodríguez
2026	Cancelled				

== Performances by nation ==
=== Venezuela International ===
As of the 2025 edition

Pos	Nation	MS	WS	MD	WD	XD	Total
1	Cuba	3		2	1	1	7
2	Trinidad and Tobago		2		1	1	4
3	Brazil		1	1	1		3
3	Guatemala			1	1	1	3
3	Mexico			1	1	1	3
6	Peru		2				2
7	Italy	1					1
7	Sri Lanka	1					1
9	Czech Republic					0.5	0.5
9	United States					0.5	0.5
Total		5	5	5	5	5	25

=== Venezuela Future Series ===
As of the 2025 edition

Pos	Nation	MS	WS	MD	WD	XD	Total
1	Brazil		1	1	2		4
2	Mexico		1			1	2
3	England	1					1
3	Peru	1					1
3	Trinidad and Tobago					1	1
6	El Salvador			0.5			0.5
6	Venezuela			0.5			0.5
Total		2	2	2	2	2	10
