= Argentina International =

Argentina badminton championships

The Argentina International is an open badminton tournament held in Argentina. The tournament has been a Pan American Badminton Circuit Future level event from 1997 till 2000. In 2012–2013, this tournament has been a BWF Future Series level by the Badminton World Federation, and since 2014, upgraded to BWF International Series with the total prize money $5,000. Badminton in Argentina began to be played in private residences, clubs and schools of foreign origin, and in 1982, the national federation, Federación de Bádminton de la República Argentina (FEBARA) is founded. In 1993, the FEBARA join the International Badminton Federation, Argentine Olympic Committee (COA), and Confederación Argentina de Deportes (CAD), and at that year, the federation started to host the national tournament which was held at CeNARD, with more than 100 players from all over the country compete. In 1997, FEBARA organized the first international tournament with the sanctioned from the Badminton Pan Am.

== Previous Winners ==
Year	Men's singles	Women's singles	Men's doubles	Women's doubles	Mixed doubles
1997	(Peru) Mario Carulla	(Peru) Adrienn Kocsis	(Peru) Mario Carulla (Peru) Federico Valdez	(Peru) Pilar Bellido (Peru) Ximena Bellido	(Peru) Mario Carulla (Peru) Adrienn Kocsis
1998	(Wales) Richard Vaughan	(England) Joanne Muggeridge	(Brazil) Guilherme Pardo (Brazil) Ricardo Trevelin	(Peru) Lorena Blanco (Peru) Ximena Bellido	(Suriname) Oscar Brandon (Peru) Adrienn Kocsis
1999	(Hong Kong) Tam Kai Chuen	(Canada) Kara Solmundson	(Hong Kong) Ma Che Kong (Hong Kong) Yau Tsz Yuk	(Peru) Sandra Jimeno (Peru) Doriana Rivera	(Portugal) Hugo Rodrigues (Portugal) Ana Ferreira
2000	(Mexico) Luis Lopezllera	(Mexico) Gabriella Rodriguez	(Mexico) Luis Lopezllera (Mexico) Bernardo Monreal	(Mexico) Laura Amaya (Mexico) Gabriella Rodriguez	(Mexico) Luis Lopezllera (Mexico) Gabriella Rodriguez
2001– 2012	No competition				
2012	(New Zealand) Joe Wu	(Chile) Tingting Chou	(Malaysia) Gan Teik Chai (Malaysia) Ong Soon Hock	(Chile) Tingting Chou (Chile) Camila Macaya	(Chile) Esteban Mujica (Chile) Tingting Chou
2013	(France) Arnaud Genin	(Brazil) Lohaynny Vicente	(Brazil) Hugo Arthuso (Brazil) Alex Yuwan Tjong	(Brazil) Paula Pereira (Brazil) Lohaynny Vicente	(Mexico) Lino Munoz (Mexico) Cynthia Gonzalez
2014	(Guatemala) Kevin Cordon	(United States) Iris Wang	(Guatemala) Solis Jonathan (Guatemala) Rodolfo Ramirez	(Brazil) Lohaynny Vicente (Brazil) Luana Vicente	(Brazil) Alex Yuwan Tjong (Brazil) Lohaynny Vicente
2015	(United States) Bjorn Seguin	(Austria) Elisabeth Baldauf	(Mexico) Job Castillo (Mexico) Lino Munoz	(Mexico) Haramara Gaitan (Mexico) Sabrina Solis	(Austria) David Obernosterer (Austria) Elisabeth Baldauf
2016	(Argentina) Dino Delmastro	(Argentina) Barbara Maria Berruezo	(Argentina) Javier De Paepe (Argentina) Martin Trejo	No competition	(Argentina) Mateo Delmastro (Argentina) Micaela Suarez
2017	No competition				
2018	(Brazil) Fabricio Farias	(Brazil) Jaqueline Lima	(Italy) Enrico Baroni (Italy) Giovanni Toti	(Argentina) Florencia Bernatene (Argentina) Bárbara María Berruezo	(Brazil) Fabricio Farias (Brazil) Jaqueline Lima
2019– 2022	No competition				
2023	Cancelled (Note: This tournament, originally to be played on 2–6 August, was later cancelled.)				
2024	No competition				

== Performances by nation ==
Top Nations
Pos	Nation	MS	WS	MD	WD	XD	Total
1	Brazil	1	2	2	2	2	9
2	Mexico	1	1	2	2	2	8
3	Peru	1	1	1	3	1	7
4	Argentina	1	1	1	1	1	5
5	Chile		1		1	1	3
6	Austria		1			1	2
6	Guatemala	1		1			2
6	Hong Kong	1		1			2
6	United States	1	1				2
10	Canada		1				1
10	England		1				1
10	France	1					1
10	Italy			1			1
10	Malaysia			1			1
10	New Zealand	1					1
10	Portugal					1	1
10	Wales	1					1
18	Hungary					0.5	0.5
18	Suriname					0.5	0.5
Total		10	10	10	9	10	49
