= Bowling at the Asian Indoor and Martial Arts Games =

Bowling have been included as events since the 2007 Asian Indoor and Martial Arts Games.

== Editions ==
Games	Year	Host city	Venue	Best nation
II	2007	Macau	Macau Bowling Centre	South Korea
III	2009	Ho Chi Minh City, Vietnam	Superbowl Center	South Korea
IV	2013	Incheon, South Korea	Anyang Hogye Gymnasium	Singapore
V	2017	Ashgabat, Turkmenistan	Ashgabat Bowling Centre	South Korea

== Events ==
Event	07	09	13	17	Years
Men's singles	X	X	X	X	4
Men's doubles	X	X	X	X	4
Men's team of 4	X	X	X	X	4
Women's singles	X	X	X	X	4
Women's doubles	X	X	X	X	4
Women's team of 4	X	X	X	X	4
Total	6	6	6	6	

== Medal table ==
Rank	Nation	Gold	Silver	Bronze	Total
1	South Korea (KOR)	12	9	7	28
2	United Arab Emirates (UAE)	4	0	3	7
3	Chinese Taipei (TPE)	2	0	5	7
4	Hong Kong (HKG)	2	0	4	6
5	Singapore (SIN)	2	0	3	5
6	China (CHN)	1	2	5	8
7	Thailand (THA)	1	1	3	5
8	Malaysia (MAS)	0	4	3	7
9	Japan (JPN)	0	3	6	9
10	Philippines (PHI)	0	2	1	3
11	Qatar (QAT)	0	2	0	2
12	Indonesia (INA)	0	1	4	5
13	Kuwait (KUW)	0	0	3	3
14	India (IND)	0	0	1	1
Totals (14 entries)		24	24	48	96
