= Dancesport at the 2007 Asian Indoor Games =

- Venue: Macao Forum
- Dates: 27–28 October 2007

Dancesport at the 2007 Asian Indoor Games was held in Macao Forum, Macau, China from 27 October to 28 October 2007.

== Medalists ==
=== Standard ===
Event	Gold	Silver	Bronze
Five dances	China; Lu Jie; Peng Ding	Kazakhstan; Yevgeniy Plokhikh; Yelena Klyuchnikova	Japan; Kazuki Sugaya; Ikuyo Ozaki
Quickstep	Japan; Masayuki Ishihara; Ayami Kubo	China; Dang Qi; Niu Jia	China; Li Sicheng; Zhou Manni
Slow foxtrot	China; Wu Zhian; Zheng Cen	Japan; Masayuki Ishihara; Ayami Kubo	China; Shen Hong; Liang Yujie
Tango	China; Shen Hong; Liang Yujie	Japan; Masayuki Ishihara; Ayami Kubo	China; Li Sicheng; Zhou Manni
Viennese waltz	Kazakhstan; Yevgeniy Plokhikh; Yelena Klyuchnikova	China; Lu Jie; Peng Ding	Japan; Tsuyoshi Nukina; Mariko Shibahara
Waltz	China; Wu Zhian; Zheng Cen	China; Dang Qi; Niu Jia	Japan; Kazuki Sugaya; Ikuyo Ozaki

=== Latin ===
Event	Gold	Silver	Bronze
Five dances	Japan; Masaki Seko; Chiaki Seko	Kazakhstan; Boris Maltsev; Zarina Shamsutdinova	China; Wang Wei; Chen Jin
Cha-cha-cha	Kazakhstan; Boris Maltsev; Zarina Shamsutdinova	China; Wang Wei; Chen Jin	China; Xie Wenchao; Lai Sha
Jive	Japan; Masaki Seko; Chiaki Seko	China; Hou Yao; Zhuang Ting	China; Xie Wenchao; Lai Sha
Paso doble	Japan; Masaki Seko; Chiaki Seko	Kazakhstan; Boris Maltsev; Zarina Shamsutdinova	China; Hou Yinshan; Fu Yue
Rumba	China; Fan Wenbo; Chen Shiyao	China; Zhao Yao; Chen Bei	Thailand; Watcharakorn Suasuebpun; Warapa Jumbala
Samba	China; Fan Wenbo; Chen Shiyao	China; Hou Yinshan; Fu Yue	Japan; Yutaka Kubota; Miyuki Kubota

== Medal table ==
Rank	Nation	Gold	Silver	Bronze	Total
1	China (CHN)	6	7	7	20
2	Japan (JPN)	4	2	4	10
3	Kazakhstan (KAZ)	2	3	0	5
4	Thailand (THA)	0	0	1	1
Totals (4 entries)		12	12	12	36

== Results ==
=== Standard ===
==== Five dances ====
28 October

Rank	Team	QF	SF	Final
1st place, gold medalist(s)	Lu Jie / Peng Ding (CHN)	45	45	8
2nd place, silver medalist(s)	Yevgeniy Plokhikh / Yelena Klyuchnikova (KAZ)	45	45	8
3rd place, bronze medalist(s)	Kazuki Sugaya / Ikuyo Ozaki (JPN)	45	43	14
4	Tsuyoshi Nukina / Mariko Shibahara (JPN)	45	36	22
5	Anton Tretyakov / Anastassiya Kutsaya (KAZ)	45	34	23.5
6	Kim Tae-jung / Jung Hee-jin (KOR)	45	32	29.5
7	Emmanuel Reyes / Maira Rosete (PHI)	45	12	
8	Brian Ocana / Karla Ocana (PHI)	40	8	
9	Apichai Promboon / Pakaorn Kuituan (THA)	41	7	
10	Lee Gwon-gyu / Park Seon-hee (KOR)	41	4	
10	Thanapol Potimu / Juthamard Muntalumpa (THA)	39	4	
12	Anthony Chua / Anita Tan (MAS)	21	0	
13	So Chin Hong / Cheng Kong Hung (MAC)	10		
14	Chen Fong Tuan / Alexa Yim (MAS)	9		
15	Andrey Nikitin / Sabina Diyarova (UZB)	8		
16	Zukhriddin Akhunkhodjaev / Yuliya Kan (UZB)	7		
17	Ieong Su Kan / Wong Sut Kuai (MAC)	6		
18	Rabih Mourad / Pamela Mananian (LIB)	2		
19	Raed Mourad / Chloe El-Hourani (LIB)	1		

==== Quickstep ====
27 October

===== Preliminaries =====
Rank	Team	QF	SF
1	Dang Qi / Niu Jia (CHN)	9	9
1	Li Sicheng / Zhou Manni (CHN)	9	9
1	Masayuki Ishihara / Ayami Kubo (JPN)	9	9
4	Lee Sang-min / Kim Hye-in (KOR)	9	8
5	Jo Sang-hyo / Lee Se-hee (KOR)	9	7
6	Takeo Wachi / Kiriko Wachi (JPN)	9	6
7	Apichai Promboon / Pakaorn Kuituan (THA)	9	4
8	Brian Ocana / Karla Ocana (PHI)	9	2
9	Handrik Williana / Lina Biandari (INA)	4	0
9	Emmanuel Reyes / Maira Rosete (PHI)	9	0
9	Tarasai Sukdee / Prachayaporn Songsawang (THA)	7	0
9	Chen Fong Tuan / Alexa Yim (MAS)	9	0
9	Phan Hồng Việt / Hoàng Thu Trang (VIE)	4	0
14	Tang Yuk Kwan / Iek Weng Tong (MAC)	2	
15	Cheang Kai Hang / Ng Wai Fong (MAC)	1	
16	Rabih Mourad / Pamela Mananian (LIB)	0	

===== Final =====
Rank	Team	Places					
Rank	Team	1	1–2	1–3	1–4	1–5	1–6
1st place, gold medalist(s)	Masayuki Ishihara / Ayami Kubo (JPN)	5					
2nd place, silver medalist(s)	Dang Qi / Niu Jia (CHN)	3	6				
3rd place, bronze medalist(s)	Li Sicheng / Zhou Manni (CHN)	1	4	9			
4	Takeo Wachi / Kiriko Wachi (JPN)	0	0	1	6		
5	Lee Sang-min / Kim Hye-in (KOR)	0	0	0	2	5	
6	Jo Sang-hyo / Lee Se-hee (KOR)	0	0	0	1	5	

==== Slow foxtrot ====
27 October

===== Preliminaries =====
Rank	Team	QF	SF
1	Shen Hong / Liang Yujie (CHN)	9	9
1	Wu Zhian / Zheng Cen (CHN)	9	9
1	Masayuki Ishihara / Ayami Kubo (JPN)	9	9
4	Kim Tae-jung / Jung Hee-jin (KOR)	9	7
5	Takeo Wachi / Kiriko Wachi (JPN)	9	6
6	Anton Tretyakov / Anastassiya Kutsaya (KAZ)	9	5
6	Jo Sang-hyo / Lee Se-hee (KOR)	9	5
8	Thepporn Mokkuntod / Jaroonrat Sinjaroen (THA)	8	2
9	So Chin Hong / Cheng Kong Hung (MAC)	6	1
9	Kelvin Toh / Rosanne Chong (SIN)	9	1
11	Brian Ocana / Karla Ocana (PHI)	9	0
11	Pawatpong Racha-apai / Thitiyapa Potimu (THA)	9	0
13	Mohammad Gojali / Tarsuni (INA)	2	
13	Leong Chin Keng / Lao Sio Kun (MAC)	2	

===== Final =====
Rank	Team	Places						
Rank	Team	1	1–2	1–3	1–4	1–5	1–6	1–7
1st place, gold medalist(s)	Wu Zhian / Zheng Cen (CHN)	4	7					
2nd place, silver medalist(s)	Masayuki Ishihara / Ayami Kubo (JPN)	2	6					
3rd place, bronze medalist(s)	Shen Hong / Liang Yujie (CHN)	3	5					
4	Takeo Wachi / Kiriko Wachi (JPN)	0	0	0	6			
5	Anton Tretyakov / Anastassiya Kutsaya (KAZ)	0	0	0	2	7		
6	Kim Tae-jung / Jung Hee-jin (KOR)	0	0	0	0	0	5	
7	Jo Sang-hyo / Lee Se-hee (KOR)	0	0	0	1	2	4	9

==== Tango ====
27 October

===== Preliminaries =====
Rank	Team	QF	SF
1	Shen Hong / Liang Yujie (CHN)	9	9
1	Kazuki Sugaya / Ikuyo Ozaki (JPN)	9	9
1	Li Sicheng / Zhou Manni (CHN)	9	9
1	Yevgeniy Plokhikh / Yelena Klyuchnikova (KAZ)	9	9
1	Masayuki Ishihara / Ayami Kubo (JPN)	9	9
6	Lee Sang-min / Kim Hye-in (KOR)	9	4
7	Lee Gwon-gyu / Park Seon-hee (KOR)	9	2
8	Emmanuel Reyes / Maira Rosete (PHI)	9	1
8	Pawatpong Racha-apai / Thitiyapa Potimu (THA)	8	1
8	Tarasai Sukdee / Prachayaporn Songsawang (THA)	8	1
11	Chen Fong Tuan / Alexa Yim (MAS)	5	0
11	Joel Madera / Annabelle Alo (PHI)	7	0
13	Phan Hồng Việt / Hoàng Thu Trang (VIE)	3	
14	Ieong Su Kan / Wong Sut Kuai (MAC)	2	
14	Mohammad Gojali / Tarsuni (INA)	2	
16	Cheong Kuok Leong / Fan Kok Meng (MAC)	1	
17	Rodrigue Aad / Tatiana Sotiry (LIB)	0	
17	Adib Sayegh / Rita Nassif (LIB)	0	
17	Handrik Williana / Lina Biandari (INA)	0	

===== Final =====
Rank	Team	Places					
Rank	Team	1	1–2	1–3	1–4	1–5	1–6
1st place, gold medalist(s)	Shen Hong / Liang Yujie (CHN)	7					
2nd place, silver medalist(s)	Masayuki Ishihara / Ayami Kubo (JPN)	1	5				
3rd place, bronze medalist(s)	Li Sicheng / Zhou Manni (CHN)	0	4	5			
4	Yevgeniy Plokhikh / Yelena Klyuchnikova (KAZ)	1	2	5			
5	Kazuki Sugaya / Ikuyo Ozaki (JPN)	0	0	3	7		
6	Lee Sang-min / Kim Hye-in (KOR)	0	0	0	0	1	9

==== Viennese waltz ====
27 October

===== Preliminaries =====
Rank	Team	QF	SF
1	Yevgeniy Plokhikh / Yelena Klyuchnikova (KAZ)	9	9
1	Lee Sang-min / Kim Hye-in (KOR)	9	9
3	Tsuyoshi Nukina / Mariko Shibahara (JPN)	6	8
3	Lu Jie / Peng Ding (CHN)	9	8
5	Takeo Wachi / Kiriko Wachi (JPN)	9	6
6	Lee Gwon-gyu / Park Seon-hee (KOR)	9	5
7	Thepporn Mokkuntod / Jaroonrat Sinjaroen (THA)	7	4
8	Thanapol Potimu / Juthamard Muntalumpa (THA)	9	3
9	Cheong Kuok Leong / Fan Kok Meng (MAC)	7	1
9	Kelvin Toh / Rosanne Chong (SIN)	9	1
11	Joel Madera / Annabelle Alo (PHI)	8	0
11	Anthony Chua / Anita Tan (MAS)	7	0
13	Ieong Su Kan / Wong Sut Kuai (MAC)	4	
13	Rabih Mourad / Pamela Mananian (LIB)	4	
15	Raed Mourad / Chloe El-Hourani (LIB)	2	

===== Final =====
Rank	Team	Places					
Rank	Team	1	1–2	1–3	1–4	1–5	1–6
1st place, gold medalist(s)	Yevgeniy Plokhikh / Yelena Klyuchnikova (KAZ)	4	8				
2nd place, silver medalist(s)	Lu Jie / Peng Ding (CHN)	3	5				
3rd place, bronze medalist(s)	Tsuyoshi Nukina / Mariko Shibahara (JPN)	1	3	7			
4	Takeo Wachi / Kiriko Wachi (JPN)	0	1	2	6		
5	Lee Sang-min / Kim Hye-in (KOR)	1	1	4	5		
6	Lee Gwon-gyu / Park Seon-hee (KOR)	0	0	0	2	4	9

==== Waltz ====
27 October

===== Preliminaries =====
Rank	Team	QF	SF
1	Wu Zhian / Zheng Cen (CHN)	9	9
1	Dang Qi / Niu Jia (CHN)	9	9
3	Kazuki Sugaya / Ikuyo Ozaki (JPN)	9	8
3	Kim Tae-jung / Jung Hee-jin (KOR)	9	8
5	Tsuyoshi Nukina / Mariko Shibahara (JPN)	8	7
6	Anton Tretyakov / Anastassiya Kutsaya (KAZ)	9	6
7	Jo Sang-hyo / Lee Se-hee (KOR)	9	4
8	Kelvin Toh / Rosanne Chong (SIN)	7	2
9	Pawatpong Racha-apai / Thitiyapa Potimu (THA)	8	1
10	Joel Madera / Annabelle Alo (PHI)	8	0
10	Anthony Chua / Anita Tan (MAS)	8	0
10	Natthaphat Prasertpuwakrit / Amolmanee Kengthanomma (THA)	9	0
13	Mohammad Gojali / Tarsuni (INA)	2	
14	So Chin Hong / Cheng Kong Hung (MAC)	1	
14	Zukhriddin Akhunkhodjaev / Yuliya Kan (UZB)	1	
14	Phan Hồng Việt / Hoàng Thu Trang (VIE)	1	
14	Leong Chin Keng / Lao Sio Kun (MAC)	1	
18	Rodrigue Aad / Tatiana Sotiry (LIB)	0	
18	Raed Mourad / Chloe El-Hourani (LIB)	0	
18	Handrik Williana / Lina Biandari (INA)	0	

===== Final =====
Rank	Team	Places					
Rank	Team	1	1–2	1–3	1–4	1–5	1–6
1st place, gold medalist(s)	Wu Zhian / Zheng Cen (CHN)	7					
2nd place, silver medalist(s)	Dang Qi / Niu Jia (CHN)	2	6				
3rd place, bronze medalist(s)	Kazuki Sugaya / Ikuyo Ozaki (JPN)	0	4	7			
4	Anton Tretyakov / Anastassiya Kutsaya (KAZ)	0	0	3	3	7	
5	Tsuyoshi Nukina / Mariko Shibahara (JPN)	0	0	1	3	7	
6	Kim Tae-jung / Jung Hee-jin (KOR)	0	0	1	4	4	9

=== Latin ===
==== Five dances ====
27 October

Rank	Team	R1	QF	SF	Final
1st place, gold medalist(s)	Masaki Seko / Chiaki Seko (JPN)	45	45	45	5
2nd place, silver medalist(s)	Boris Maltsev / Zarina Shamsutdinova (KAZ)	45	45	44	10
3rd place, bronze medalist(s)	Wang Wei / Chen Jin (CHN)	45	44	37	16
4	Hou Yao / Zhuang Ting (CHN)	45	45	39	19
5	Yutaka Kubota / Miyuki Kubota (JPN)	45	45	36	26
6	Akhmet Kalmatayev / Khristina Ivolgina (KAZ)	44	39	25	29
7	Gerard Jamili / Carol Bacera (PHI)	44	45	22	
8	Kim Kwang-sick / Jo You-in (KOR)	45	38	12	
9	Go Byeong-su / Go Sun (KOR)	43	33	7	
10	Bandit Chaimuti / Nathaihai Chaimuti (THA)	45	29	3	
11	Jonathan Fam / Therese Tan (MAS)	42	23	0	
11	Wang Yu-hung / Hsiao Yuan-ju (TPE)	32	25	0	
13	Reynier Mercado / Judith Melencio (PHI)	45	21		
14	Nguyễn Hải Anh / Nguyễn Hồng Thi (VIE)	45	20		
15	Andrey Nikitin / Sabina Diyarova (UZB)	43	15		
16	Yong Chun Wai / Yeap Yen Chin (MAS)	39	12		
17	Tayatri Prommool / Yada Tharaudom (THA)	42	10		
18	Fong Wai Kin / U Mei Kok (MAC)	32	6		
19	Althur Malik / Anita Meysiska (INA)	23			
20	Zukhriddin Akhunkhodjaev / Yuliya Kan (UZB)	19			
21	Shannon Benjamin / Priti Gupta (IND)	1			
21	Kevin Nugara / Rukshika Fernando (SRI)	1			
23	Charbel Rameh / Zeina Assaf (LIB)	0			
23	Abdo Dalloul / Renata Mejbel (SYR)	0			
23	Francois Khattar / Rita Farjallah (LIB)	0			

==== Cha-cha-cha ====
28 October

===== Preliminaries =====
Rank	Team	R1	QF	SF
1	Boris Maltsev / Zarina Shamsutdinova (KAZ)	9	9	9
1	Xie Wenchao / Lai Sha (CHN)	9	9	9
3	Wang Wei / Chen Jin (CHN)	9	9	8
4	Tsuneki Masatani / Megumi Saito (JPN)	9	8	7
4	Kim Kwang-sick / Jo You-in (KOR)	9	9	7
6	Yu Hsueh-chu / Su Tzu-kuan (TPE)	9	9	4
6	Theerawut Thommuangpak / Phuthinat Khanitnusorn (THA)	8	7	4
8	Yumiya Kubota / Rara Kubota (JPN)	9	9	3
9	Jung Kwang-ho / Yeo Song-hee (KOR)	9	7	2
10	Reynier Mercado / Judith Melencio (PHI)	9	9	1
11	Bandit Chaimuti / Nathaihai Chaimuti (THA)	9	7	0
11	Jonathan Fam / Therese Tan (MAS)	9	6	0
13	Micheal Yong / Janet Gooi (MAS)	9	5	
14	Tsui Kim Hung / Hau Mei Sheung (HKG)	7	3	
15	Lim Chong Aik / Riane Low (SIN)	7	1	
15	Ariawan Pradityo / Aldila Dita Rachma (INA)	9	1	
17	Susilo Hadisuwiryo / Lanny Budiani (INA)	6	0	
17	Dany Wakim / Cynthia Assadourian (LIB)	8	0	
17	Toni Rameh / Rola Abdelmalak (LIB)	6	0	
20	Abdo Dalloul / Renata Mejbel (SYR)	2		
21	Lai In Kuong / Chong Mou Leng (MAC)	1		
22	Shannon Benjamin / Priti Gupta (IND)	0		
22	Diago Pereira / Reesha Dhulap (IND)	0		

===== Final =====
Rank	Team	Places						
Rank	Team	1	1–2	1–3	1–4	1–5	1–6	1–7
1st place, gold medalist(s)	Boris Maltsev / Zarina Shamsutdinova (KAZ)	7						
2nd place, silver medalist(s)	Wang Wei / Chen Jin (CHN)	2	6					
3rd place, bronze medalist(s)	Xie Wenchao / Lai Sha (CHN)	0	3	8				
4	Tsuneki Masatani / Megumi Saito (JPN)	0	1	2	4	6		
5	Theerawut Thommuangpak / Phuthinat Khanitnusorn (THA)	0	0	0	0	6		
6	Kim Kwang-sick / Jo You-in (KOR)	0	0	0	3	3	6	
6	Yu Hsueh-chu / Su Tzu-kuan (TPE)	0	0	0	3	3	6	

==== Jive ====
28 October

===== Preliminaries =====
Rank	Team	R1	QF	SF
1	Hou Yao / Zhuang Ting (CHN)	9	9	9
1	Masaki Seko / Chiaki Seko (JPN)	9	9	9
3	Yumiya Kubota / Rara Kubota (JPN)	9	9	8
3	Go Byeong-su / Go Sun (KOR)	9	8	8
5	Xie Wenchao / Lai Sha (CHN)	9	9	7
6	Akhmet Kalmatayev / Khristina Ivolgina (KAZ)	9	9	5
7	John Erolle Melencio / Dearlie Gerodias (PHI)	9	9	3
8	Yu Hsueh-chu / Su Tzu-kuan (TPE)	9	8	2
8	Melvin Tan / Sharon Tan (SIN)	9	4	2
10	Tayatri Prommool / Yada Tharaudom (THA)	9	8	1
11	Jung Hee-jung / Kim Hyun-jin (KOR)	8	8	0
11	Yong Chun Wai / Yeap Yen Chin (MAS)	8	4	0
11	Auttapol Jaroon / Natchakorn Jaijun (THA)	9	7	0
14	Susilo Hadisuwiryo / Lanny Budiani (INA)	8	2	
14	Lim Chong Aik / Riane Low (SIN)	7	2	
14	Toni Rameh / Rola Abdelmalak (LIB)	7	2	
17	Fong Wai Kin / U Mei Kok (MAC)	9	1	
18	Michael Alexander / Jessica Suriadi (INA)	8	0	
19	Lo Hong Kio / Cheong Hio Lai (MAC)	6		
20	Mher Kandoyan / Pamela Khairallah (LIB)	2		
21	Shannon Benjamin / Priti Gupta (IND)	0		

===== Final =====
Rank	Team	Places					
Rank	Team	1	1–2	1–3	1–4	1–5	1–6
1st place, gold medalist(s)	Masaki Seko / Chiaki Seko (JPN)	9					
2nd place, silver medalist(s)	Hou Yao / Zhuang Ting (CHN)	0	8				
3rd place, bronze medalist(s)	Xie Wenchao / Lai Sha (CHN)	0	0	4	8		
4	Yumiya Kubota / Rara Kubota (JPN)	0	1	4	5		
5	Akhmet Kalmatayev / Khristina Ivolgina (KAZ)	0	0	1	4	7	
6	Go Byeong-su / Go Sun (KOR)	0	0	0	1	6	

==== Paso doble ====
28 October

===== Preliminaries =====
Rank	Team	R1	QF	SF
1	Masaki Seko / Chiaki Seko (JPN)	9	9	9
1	Boris Maltsev / Zarina Shamsutdinova (KAZ)	9	9	9
3	Zhao Yao / Chen Bei (CHN)	9	9	8
4	Watcharakorn Suasuebpun / Warapa Jumbala (THA)	9	7	7
5	Hou Yinshan / Fu Yue (CHN)	9	9	6
6	Gerald Jamili / Carol Bacera (PHI)	9	7	4
6	Jung Kwang-ho / Yeo Song-hee (KOR)	9	8	4
8	Yumiya Kubota / Rara Kubota (JPN)	9	9	3
9	John Erolle Melencio / Dearlie Gerodias (PHI)	9	8	2
10	Jung Hee-jung / Kim Hyun-jin (KOR)	9	7	1
10	Micheal Yong / Janet Gooi (MAS)	9	6	1
12	Wang Yu-hung / Hsiao Yuan-ju (TPE)	9	8	0
13	Sathaporn Raktoum / Suchadavee Wongchaiphawat (THA)	9	5	
14	Nguyễn Hải Anh / Nguyễn Hồng Thi (VIE)	9	4	
15	Fong Wai Kin / U Mei Kok (MAC)	9	1	
15	Tsui Kim Hung / Hau Mei Sheung (HKG)	9	1	
15	Althur Malik / Anita Meysiska (INA)	7	1	
18	Susilo Hadisuwiryo / Lanny Budiani (INA)	9	0	
19	Lo Hong Kio / Cheong Hio Lai (MAC)	2		
20	Elie Sahyoun / Nathaline Ounanian (LIB)	0		
20	Aram Gharibian / Sandra Elia (LIB)	0		

===== Final =====
Rank	Team	Places						
Rank	Team	1	1–2	1–3	1–4	1–5	1–6	1–7
1st place, gold medalist(s)	Masaki Seko / Chiaki Seko (JPN)	8						
2nd place, silver medalist(s)	Boris Maltsev / Zarina Shamsutdinova (KAZ)	1	7					
3rd place, bronze medalist(s)	Hou Yinshan / Fu Yue (CHN)	0	0	6				
4	Zhao Yao / Chen Bei (CHN)	0	2	2	7			
5	Watcharakorn Suasuebpun / Warapa Jumbala (THA)	0	0	2	6			
6	Gerald Jamili / Carol Bacera (PHI)	0	0	0	0	2	8	
7	Jung Kwang-ho / Yeo Song-hee (KOR)	0	0	0	0	0	1	9

==== Rumba ====
28 October

===== Preliminaries =====
Rank	Team	R1	QF	SF
1	Zhao Yao / Chen Bei (CHN)	9	9	9
2	Fan Wenbo / Chen Shiyao (CHN)	9	9	8
2	Watcharakorn Suasuebpun / Warapa Jumbala (THA)	9	9	8
4	Tsuneki Masatani / Megumi Saito (JPN)	9	9	6
4	Jung Kwang-ho / Yeo Song-hee (KOR)	9	7	6
6	Gerald Jamili / Carol Bacera (PHI)	9	9	5
6	Yutaka Kubota / Miyuki Kubota (JPN)	9	9	5
8	Jung Hee-jung / Kim Hyun-jin (KOR)	9	9	3
9	Micheal Yong / Janet Gooi (MAS)	9	7	2
10	Dickson Zhou / Michelle Loi (MAC)	9	6	1
10	Reynier Mercado / Judith Melencio (PHI)	9	7	1
12	Jonathan Fam / Therese Tan (MAS)	9	6	0
13	Sathaporn Raktoum / Suchadavee Wongchaiphawat (THA)	8	5	
14	Melvin Tan / Sharon Tan (SIN)	7	3	
15	Lim Chong Aik / Riane Low (SIN)	7	1	
15	Michael Alexander / Jessica Suriadi (INA)	8	1	
15	Lai In Kuong / Chong Mou Leng (MAC)	8	1	
15	Ariawan Pradityo / Aldila Dita Rachma (INA)	9	1	
19	Dany Wakim / Cynthia Assadourian (LIB)	5		
20	Aram Gharibian / Sandra Elia (LIB)	2		
21	Diago Pereira / Reesha Dhulap (IND)	0		

===== Final =====
Rank	Team	Places						
Rank	Team	1	1–2	1–3	1–4	1–5	1–6	1–7
1st place, gold medalist(s)	Fan Wenbo / Chen Shiyao (CHN)	6						
2nd place, silver medalist(s)	Zhao Yao / Chen Bei (CHN)	3	9					
3rd place, bronze medalist(s)	Watcharakorn Suasuebpun / Warapa Jumbala (THA)	0	1	4	5			
4	Yutaka Kubota / Miyuki Kubota (JPN)	0	0	4	5			
5	Tsuneki Masatani / Megumi Saito (JPN)	0	1	1	3	5		
6	Gerald Jamili / Carol Bacera (PHI)	0	0	0	2	5		
7	Jung Kwang-ho / Yeo Song-hee (KOR)	0	0	0	3	3	6	

==== Samba ====
28 October

===== Preliminaries =====
Rank	Team	R1	QF	SF
1	Yutaka Kubota / Miyuki Kubota (JPN)	9	9	8
1	Akhmet Kalmatayev / Khristina Ivolgina (KAZ)	9	9	8
1	Hou Yinshan / Fu Yue (CHN)	9	9	8
4	Fan Wenbo / Chen Shiyao (CHN)	9	8	7
5	Tsuneki Masatani / Megumi Saito (JPN)	9	8	6
6	Kim Kwang-sick / Jo You-in (KOR)	9	5	4
6	Yu Hsueh-chu / Su Tzu-kuan (TPE)	9	8	4
8	Theerawut Thommuangpak / Phuthinat Khanitnusorn (THA)	9	8	3
9	Watcharakorn Suasuebpun / Warapa Jumbala (THA)	9	8	2
9	John Erolle Melencio / Dearlie Gerodias (PHI)	9	5	2
11	Go Byeong-su / Go Sun (KOR)	9	8	1
11	Wang Yu-hung / Hsiao Yuan-ju (TPE)	9	8	1
13	Nguyễn Hải Anh / Nguyễn Hồng Thi (VIE)	9	8	0
14	Yong Chun Wai / Yeap Yen Chin (MAS)	9	4	
15	Melvin Tan / Sharon Tan (SIN)	9	2	
16	Ariawan Pradityo / Aldila Dita Rachma (INA)	8	1	
17	Michael Alexander / Jessica Suriadi (INA)	6	0	
17	Andrey Nikitin / Sabina Diyarova (UZB)	9	0	
19	Lo Hong Kio / Cheong Hio Lai (MAC)	2		
19	Toni Rameh / Rola Abdelmalak (LIB)	2		
21	Diago Pereira / Reesha Dhulap (IND)	0		
21	Abdo Dalloul / Renata Mejbel (SYR)	0		
21	Mike Poladian / Amanda Semaan (LIB)	0		

===== Final =====
Rank	Team	Places						
Rank	Team	1	1–2	1–3	1–4	1–5	1–6	1–7
1st place, gold medalist(s)	Fan Wenbo / Chen Shiyao (CHN)	5						
2nd place, silver medalist(s)	Hou Yinshan / Fu Yue (CHN)	3	6					
3rd place, bronze medalist(s)	Yutaka Kubota / Miyuki Kubota (JPN)	1	3	7				
4	Akhmet Kalmatayev / Khristina Ivolgina (KAZ)	0	1	2	6			
5	Tsuneki Masatani / Megumi Saito (JPN)	0	2	3	4	6		
6	Yu Hsueh-chu / Su Tzu-kuan (TPE)	0	0	0	2	6		
7	Kim Kwang-sick / Jo You-in (KOR)	0	0	1	1	1	4	9
