= Kickboxing at the 2007 Asian Indoor Games =

- Venue: East Asian Games Dome
- Dates: 26–27 October 2007

Kickboxing was a demonstration sport at the 2007 Asian Indoor Games was held in Macau, China from 26 October to 27 October 2007.

The domination of Kazakhstan both in full contact and low-kick was overwhelming: seven gold medals, three silver and 4 bronze in 10 weight divisions. Kuwait won four gold medals, 1 silver and 3 bronze in point fighting (semi contact), while Jordan was third overall with 3 gold medals (2 in the ring and 1 on the tatami), 4 silver and 6 bronze. Kyrgyzstan, India, Iraq, Mongolia and Uzbekistan won the remaining medals.

== Medalists ==
=== Point fighting ===
Event	Gold	Silver	Bronze
−57 kg	Mohammad Al-Mathkori; Kuwait	Moawiah Abuhammad; Jordan	Nurgali Nauryzbayev; Kazakhstan
−57 kg	Mohammad Al-Mathkori; Kuwait	Moawiah Abuhammad; Jordan	Anchal Sharma; India
−63 kg	Jasem Al-Otaibi; Kuwait	Medet Abzhanov; Kazakhstan	Ariunboldyn Norov; Mongolia
−63 kg	Jasem Al-Otaibi; Kuwait	Medet Abzhanov; Kazakhstan	Anas Ibrahim; Jordan
−69 kg	Meshal Al-Handal; Kuwait	Stelyan Avramidi; Kazakhstan	Boldbaataryn Naadam; Mongolia
−69 kg	Meshal Al-Handal; Kuwait	Stelyan Avramidi; Kazakhstan	Osama Al-Adam; Jordan
−74 kg	Nader Al-Jafari; Jordan	Saif Al-Handal; Kuwait	Sanjay Katode; India
−74 kg	Nader Al-Jafari; Jordan	Saif Al-Handal; Kuwait	Ruslan Ganza; Kazakhstan
−79 kg	Hasan Al-Majadi; Kuwait	Abdullah Al-Burini; Jordan	Shukhrat Kudaiberdiyev; Kazakhstan
−79 kg	Hasan Al-Majadi; Kuwait	Abdullah Al-Burini; Jordan	Satish Rajhance; India

=== Full contact ===
Event	Gold	Silver	Bronze
−57 kg	Amir Tnalin; Kazakhstan	Ahmad Aburub; Jordan	Mohammad Amir Khan; India
−57 kg	Amir Tnalin; Kazakhstan	Ahmad Aburub; Jordan	Farkhod Abdunazarov; Uzbekistan
−63 kg	Aday Abuhasoah; Jordan	Qayssar Shafi; Iraq	Mashrab Ruziev; Uzbekistan
−63 kg	Aday Abuhasoah; Jordan	Qayssar Shafi; Iraq	Ölziibatyn Enkhbayar; Mongolia
−71 kg	Stalbek Darkanbaev; Kyrgyzstan	Alexey Dementyev; Kazakhstan	Mohammad Al-Muhanna; Kuwait
−71 kg	Stalbek Darkanbaev; Kyrgyzstan	Alexey Dementyev; Kazakhstan	Magsarjavyn Batjargal; Mongolia
−75 kg	Azamat Belgibayev; Kazakhstan	Syam Parsad; India	Abdullah Al-Beesheh; Jordan
−75 kg	Azamat Belgibayev; Kazakhstan	Syam Parsad; India	None awarded
−86 kg	Georgiy Yemelyanov; Kazakhstan	Jad Al-Wahash; Jordan	Pardeep; India
−86 kg	Georgiy Yemelyanov; Kazakhstan	Jad Al-Wahash; Jordan	None awarded

=== Low kick ===
Event	Gold	Silver	Bronze
−57 kg	Bolot Kudaibergenov; Kazakhstan	Mirbek Suiumbaev; Kyrgyzstan	Ölziibadrakhyn Saruul-Od; Mongolia
−57 kg	Bolot Kudaibergenov; Kazakhstan	Mirbek Suiumbaev; Kyrgyzstan	Ali Ahmad Khalaf; Jordan
−63 kg	Maxut Ibrayev; Kazakhstan	Mirlan Ibraimov; Kyrgyzstan	Khaled Al-Azemi; Kuwait
−63 kg	Maxut Ibrayev; Kazakhstan	Mirlan Ibraimov; Kyrgyzstan	Murad Al-Jarajreh; Jordan
−71 kg	Bobirzhan Artykbayev; Kazakhstan	Kumar Jaliev; Kyrgyzstan	Omarkasim Tamboli; India
−71 kg	Bobirzhan Artykbayev; Kazakhstan	Kumar Jaliev; Kyrgyzstan	Mahanadali Tashturgunov; Uzbekistan
−75 kg	Nurlan Nurgaliyev; Kazakhstan	Alen Ofoyo; Kyrgyzstan	Tareq Al-Zaabi; Kuwait
−75 kg	Nurlan Nurgaliyev; Kazakhstan	Alen Ofoyo; Kyrgyzstan	Mohammad Al-Ewaidat; Jordan
−86 kg	Hamza Wedaa; Jordan	Pradeep Shinde; India	Makhomejan Kurbanov; Kazakhstan
−86 kg	Hamza Wedaa; Jordan	Pradeep Shinde; India	None awarded

== Medal table ==
Rank	Nation	Gold	Silver	Bronze	Total
1	Kazakhstan (KAZ)	7	3	4	14
2	Kuwait (KUW)	4	1	3	8
3	Jordan (JOR)	3	4	6	13
4	Kyrgyzstan (KGZ)	1	4	0	5
5	India (IND)	0	2	6	8
6	Iraq (IRQ)	0	1	0	1
7	Mongolia (MGL)	0	0	5	5
8	Uzbekistan (UZB)	0	0	3	3
Totals (8 entries)		15	15	27	57

== Results ==
=== Point fighting ===
==== 57 kg ====
1/4 finals 26 October
Ölziibatyn Törbayar (MGL)	11
Mohammad Al-Mathkori (KUW)	16

1/2 finals 27 October
Moawiah Abuhammad (JOR)	12
Nurgali Nauryzbayev (KAZ)	9
Anchal Sharma (IND)	6
Mohammad Al-Mathkori (KUW)	16

Final; 27 October
Moawiah Abuhammad (JOR)	6
Mohammad Al-Mathkori (KUW)	12

==== 63 kg ====
1/4 finals 26 October		1/2 finals 27 October		Final; 27 October
		Medet Abzhanov (KAZ)	13
		Ariunboldyn Norov (MGL)	3
				Medet Abzhanov (KAZ)	9
Pankaj Mahanta (IND)	10			Jasem Al-Otaibi (KUW)	15
Anas Ibrahim (JOR)	19	Anas Ibrahim (JOR)
		Jasem Al-Otaibi (KUW)	RSC

==== 69 kg ====
1/4 finals 26 October
Laxman Koli (IND)	8
Boldbaataryn Naadam (MGL)	15

1/2 finals 27 October
Boldbaataryn Naadam (MGL)	10
Stelyan Avramidi (KAZ)	15
Osama Al-Adam (JOR)	5
Meshal Al-Handal (KUW)	15

Final; 27 October
Stelyan Avramidi (KAZ)	11
Meshal Al-Handal (KUW)	13

==== 74 kg ====
1/2 finals 27 October		Final; 27 October
Saif Al-Handal (KUW)	12
Sanjay Katode (IND)	10	Saif Al-Handal (KUW)	8
Nader Al-Jafari (JOR)	11	Nader Al-Jafari (JOR)	9
Ruslan Ganza (KAZ)	1

==== 79 kg ====
1/2 finals 27 October		Final; 27 October
Shukhrat Kudaiberdiyev (KAZ)	9
Hasan Al-Majadi (KUW)	12	Hasan Al-Majadi (KUW)	RSC
Satish Rajhance (IND)	4	Abdullah Al-Burini (JOR)
Abdullah Al-Burini (JOR)	14

=== Full contact ===
==== 57 kg ====
1/4 finals 26 October		1/2 finals 27 October		Final; 27 October
Sed-Ochiryn Odbayar (MGL)	0
Amir Tnalin (KAZ)	3	Amir Tnalin (KAZ)	3
Mohammad Amir Khan (IND)	2	Mohammad Amir Khan (IND)	0
Basim Matar (IRQ)	1			Amir Tnalin (KAZ)	3
Utkir Hudayarov (KGZ)	1			Ahmad Aburub (JOR)	0
Ahmad Aburub (JOR)	2	Ahmad Aburub (JOR)	2
Tyrone Naticho (PHI)	0	Farkhod Abdunazarov (UZB)	1
Farkhod Abdunazarov (UZB)	3

==== 63 kg ====
1/4 finals 26 October		1/2 finals 27 October		Final; 27 October
Mashrab Ruziev (UZB)	3
Salidjan Arbuzov (KGZ)	0	Mashrab Ruziev (UZB)	1
Abdukhalim Bakhtiyev (KAZ)	0	Aday Abuhasoah (JOR)	2
Aday Abuhasoah (JOR)	3			Aday Abuhasoah (JOR)	3
Praveen Laxury (IND)	0			Qayssar Shafi (IRQ)	0
Ölziibatyn Enkhbayar (MGL)	3	Ölziibatyn Enkhbayar (MGL)	1
Jarroh Al-Fadhli (KUW)	0	Qayssar Shafi (IRQ)	2
Qayssar Shafi (IRQ)	3

==== 71 kg ====
1/4 finals 26 October
Alexey Dementyev (KAZ)	KO
M. Tomba Singh (IND)
Emad Abu Irmais (JOR)	1
Magsarjavyn Batjargal (MGL)	2

1/2 finals 27 October
Mohammad Al-Muhanna (KUW)	0
Alexey Dementyev (KAZ)	3
Stalbek Darkanbaev (KGZ)	2
Magsarjavyn Batjargal (MGL)	1

Final; 27 October
Alexey Dementyev (KAZ)	1
Stalbek Darkanbaev (KGZ)	2

==== 75 kg ====
1/2 finals 27 October		Final; 27 October
Abdullah Al-Beesheh (JOR)
Azamat Belgibayev (KAZ)	KO	Azamat Belgibayev (KAZ)	KO
		Syam Parsad (IND)

==== 86 kg ====
1/2 finals 27 October		Final; 27 October
Pardeep (IND)	0
Georgiy Yemelyanov (KAZ)	3	Georgiy Yemelyanov (KAZ)	3
		Jad Al-Wahash (JOR)	0

=== Low kick ===
==== 57 kg ====
1/4 finals 26 October		1/2 finals 27 October		Final; 27 October
Armando Daligdig (PHI)	0
Bolot Kudaibergenov (KAZ)	3	Bolot Kudaibergenov (KAZ)	3
Tarkesh Godbole (IND)	1	Ölziibadrakhyn Saruul-Od (MGL)	0
Ölziibadrakhyn Saruul-Od (MGL)	2			Bolot Kudaibergenov (KAZ)	3
Mohammad Al-Enezi (KUW)	0			Mirbek Suiumbaev (KGZ)	0
Ali Ahmad Khalaf (JOR)	3	Ali Ahmad Khalaf (JOR)	0
		Mirbek Suiumbaev (KGZ)	3

==== 63 kg ====
1/4 finals 26 October
Khaled Al-Azemi (KUW)	3
Badong Valdueza (PHI)	0
Murad Al-Jarajreh (JOR)	3
Erdenechuluuny Buyanbat (MGL)	0
Subhachandra Singh (IND)
Maxut Ibrayev (KAZ)	KO

1/2 finals 27 October
Mirlan Ibraimov (KGZ)	3
Khaled Al-Azemi (KUW)	0
Murad Al-Jarajreh (JOR)	0
Maxut Ibrayev (KAZ)	3

Final; 27 October
Mirlan Ibraimov (KGZ)	0
Maxut Ibrayev (KAZ)	3

==== 71 kg ====
1/4 finals 26 October		1/2 finals 27 October		Final; 27 October
		Kumar Jaliev (KGZ)	KO
		Omarkasim Tamboli (IND)
				Kumar Jaliev (KGZ)	0
Bobirzhan Artykbayev (KAZ)	KO			Bobirzhan Artykbayev (KAZ)	3
Mahmoud Al-Khatib (JOR)		Bobirzhan Artykbayev (KAZ)	2
		Mahanadali Tashturgunov (UZB)	1

==== 75 kg ====
1/4 finals 26 October		1/2 finals 27 October		Final; 27 October
		Alen Ofoyo (KGZ)	WO
Tareq Al-Zaabi (KUW)	KO	Tareq Al-Zaabi (KUW)
Sinovasan Pajaniraja (IND)				Alen Ofoyo (KGZ)	1
Karzan Jaafar (IRQ)	0			Nurlan Nurgaliyev (KAZ)	2
Mohammad Al-Ewaidat (JOR)	3	Mohammad Al-Ewaidat (JOR)	0
		Nurlan Nurgaliyev (KAZ)	3

==== 86 kg ====
1/2 finals 27 October		Final; 27 October
Hamza Wedaa (JOR)	2
Makhomejan Kurbanov (KAZ)	1	Hamza Wedaa (JOR)	KO
		Pradeep Shinde (IND)
