= Finswimming at the 2007 Asian Indoor Games =

Competition in Macau Olympic Aqutic Centre, China

- Venue: Macau Olympic Aquatic Centre
- Dates: 27–28 October 2007

Finswimming at the 2007 Asian Indoor Games was held in Macau Olympic Aquatic Centre, Macau, China from 27 October to 28 October 2007. The competition included only surface events.

== Medalists ==
=== Men ===
Event	Gold	Silver	Bronze
50 m	Yuan Haifeng; China	Hideaki Sakai; Japan	Kim Tae-hyun; South Korea
100 m	Kim Tae-hyun; South Korea	Miao Jingwei; China	Phan Lưu Cẩm Thành; Vietnam
200 m	Jian Ka; China	Yoon Young-joong; South Korea	Nguyễn Trung Kiên; Vietnam
4 × 100 m relay	China; Miao Jingwei; Li Hui; Jian Ka; Yuan Haifeng	South Korea; Kim Tae-hyun; Lee Kwan-ho; Kwon Yong-jun; Yoon Young-joong	Vietnam; Trần Bảo Thu; Phạm Toàn Thắng; Nguyễn Trung Kiên; Phan Lưu Cẩm Thành

=== Women ===
Event	Gold	Silver	Bronze
50 m	Xu Huanshan; China	Jang Ye-sol; South Korea	Anastassiya Zinovyeva; Kazakhstan
100 m	Zhu Baozhen; China	Liang Yaoyue; China	Bae So-hyun; South Korea
200 m	Li Jing; China	Zhong Jiexia; China	Bae So-hyun; South Korea
4 × 100 m relay	China; Zhu Baozhen; Liu Jiao; Xu Huanshan; Liang Yaoyue	South Korea; Jang Ye-sol; Jeong Hyeon; Bae So-hyun; Jeon Ah-ram	Japan; Ran Ogata; Yayoi Sakamoto; Yuka Endo; Sachika Yamasaki

== Medal table ==
Rank	Nation	Gold	Silver	Bronze	Total
1	China (CHN)	7	3	0	10
2	South Korea (KOR)	1	4	3	8
3	Japan (JPN)	0	1	1	2
4	Vietnam (VIE)	0	0	3	3
5	Kazakhstan (KAZ)	0	0	1	1
Totals (5 entries)		8	8	8	24

== Results ==
=== Men ===
==== 50 m ====
27 October

Rank	Athlete	Heats	Final
1st place, gold medalist(s)	Yuan Haifeng (CHN)	16.52	16.04
2nd place, silver medalist(s)	Hideaki Sakai (JPN)	16.77	16.20
3rd place, bronze medalist(s)	Kim Tae-hyun (KOR)	16.75	16.32
4	Phan Lưu Cẩm Thành (VIE)	16.90	16.55
5	Lu Jiankun (CHN)	17.12	16.88
6	Adrian Sansoldi Lamano (INA)	17.10	17.16
7	Lee Kwan-ho (KOR)	16.51	17.25
8	Phạm Toàn Thắng (VIE)	17.46	17.68
9	Polad Talybov (KAZ)	18.06	
10	Lu Chin-huang (TPE)	18.23	
11	Bayu Adiwibowo (INA)	18.25	
12	Mhdrafaat Al-Hlli (SYR)	18.86	
13	Nikolay Yugay (KAZ)	19.25	
14	Ryunosuke Hirata (JPN)	19.34	
15	Mahmoud Hafeth (JOR)	19.52	
16	Yip Wing Ki (HKG)	19.96	
17	Anees Al-Najadat (JOR)	20.08	
18	Soheil Maleka Ashtiani (IRI)	20.60	
19	Rickie Ryan Tan (PHI)	20.74	
20	Lam Chon U (MAC)	22.04	
21	Gerwin Domingo (PHI)	22.35	
22	Ng Io Seng (MAC)	22.92	

==== 100 m ====
27 October

Rank	Athlete	Heats	Final
1st place, gold medalist(s)	Kim Tae-hyun (KOR)	38.11	36.11
2nd place, silver medalist(s)	Miao Jingwei (CHN)	38.32	36.23
3rd place, bronze medalist(s)	Phan Lưu Cẩm Thành (VIE)	38.08	36.96
4	Li Hui (CHN)	37.21	36.97
5	Hideaki Sakai (JPN)	37.76	37.17
6	Trần Bảo Thu (VIE)	37.90	37.27
7	Valeriy Yudin (KAZ)	38.77	39.15
8	Kwon Yong-jun (KOR)	37.67	39.26
9	Adrian Sansoldi Lamano (INA)	39.03	
10	Lu Chin-huang (TPE)	40.13	
11	Shigehisa Todoko (JPN)	41.14	
12	Mhdrafaat Al-Hlli (SYR)	42.19	
13	Denis Kravtsov (KAZ)	42.97	
14	Nurul Fajri (INA)	43.28	
15	Allaaedin Al-Hlli (SYR)	43.32	
16	Ahmad Al-Okoosh (JOR)	43.53	
17	Paul Anthony Capule (PHI)	45.49	
18	Yip Wing Ki (HKG)	45.58	
19	Rickie Ryan Tan (PHI)	46.11	
20	Ng Io Seng (MAC)	54.10	
21	Lei Iat Long (MAC)	54.12	

==== 200 m ====
28 October

Rank	Athlete	Heats	Final
1st place, gold medalist(s)	Jian Ka (CHN)	1:27.28	1:23.51
2nd place, silver medalist(s)	Yoon Young-joong (KOR)	1:28.50	1:23.84
3rd place, bronze medalist(s)	Nguyễn Trung Kiên (VIE)	1:26.98	1:24.33
4	Trần Bảo Thu (VIE)	1:30.70	1:25.56
5	Kwon Yong-jun (KOR)	1:29.91	1:27.53
6	Valeriy Yudin (KAZ)	1:28.13	1:27.93
7	Petrol Apostle Gasoline (INA)	1:31.63	1:31.95
8	Allaaedin Al-Hlli (SYR)	1:31.35	1:33.88
9	Feng Jiali (CHN)	1:32.11	
10	Yevgeniy Zaikin (KAZ)	1:33.41	
11	Lu Chin-huang (TPE)	1:33.92	
12	Octavian Riyanto (INA)	1:34.21	
13	Faris Demyaty (JOR)	1:39.28	
14	Paul Anthony Capule (PHI)	1:45.43	
15	Yip Wing Ki (HKG)	1:48.90	
16	Chiu Kai Man (MAC)	1:55.24	
17	Gerwin Domingo (PHI)	1:58.52	
18	Wong Ka Iat (MAC)	2:02.37	

==== 4 × 100 m relay ====
28 October

Rank	Team	Final
1st place, gold medalist(s)	China (CHN)	2:26.39
2nd place, silver medalist(s)	South Korea (KOR)	2:27.20
3rd place, bronze medalist(s)	Vietnam (VIE)	2:28.73
4	Indonesia (INA)	2:39.63
5	Japan (JPN)	2:39.91
6	Kazakhstan (KAZ)	2:44.35
7	Jordan (JOR)	2:54.64
8	Macau (MAC)	3:25.05

=== Women ===
==== 50 m ====
27 October

Rank	Athlete	Heats	Final
1st place, gold medalist(s)	Xu Huanshan (CHN)	18.57	18.11
2nd place, silver medalist(s)	Jang Ye-sol (KOR)	19.63	19.18
3rd place, bronze medalist(s)	Anastassiya Zinovyeva (KAZ)	19.60	19.28
4	Jeong Hyeon (KOR)	19.89	19.69
5	Lê Anh Thư (VIE)	19.98	19.71
6	Yayoi Sakamoto (JPN)	20.20	20.12
7	Huỳnh Thị Yến Nhi (VIE)	20.66	20.25
8	Liu Qi (CHN)	20.73	20.85
9	Liu Hao-min (TPE)	20.75	
10	Ran Ogata (JPN)	20.79	
11	Vera Ryabova (KAZ)	20.82	
12	Angeline Soegianto (INA)	20.87	
13	Vera Haryanto (INA)	22.14	
14	Lyllian Grace Banzon (PHI)	23.28	
15	Leung Wing Hin (HKG)	24.26	
16	Joanna Un (MAC)	24.60	
17	Trisha Rhoda Darnayla (PHI)	28.74	
18	Virginia Un (MAC)	30.58	

==== 100 m ====
27 October

Rank	Athlete	Heats	Final
1st place, gold medalist(s)	Zhu Baozhen (CHN)	41.66	39.68
2nd place, silver medalist(s)	Liang Yaoyue (CHN)	43.98	40.37
3rd place, bronze medalist(s)	Bae So-hyun (KOR)	42.78	41.28
4	Anastassiya Zinovyeva (KAZ)	43.01	43.91
5	Jeong Hyeon (KOR)	45.36	44.14
6	Vera Ryabova (KAZ)	44.75	44.84
7	Chu Thị Minh Thúy (VIE)	45.20	45.11
8	Lê Thị Như Hoài (VIE)	44.99	45.26
9	Ran Ogata (JPN)	45.42	
9	Yayoi Sakamoto (JPN)	45.42	
11	Liu Hao-min (TPE)	46.06	
12	Angeline Soegianto (INA)	46.30	
13	Desy Ratnasih Dewanti (INA)	49.06	
14	Leung Wing Hin (HKG)	52.83	
15	Keshia Emmaline Fule (PHI)	56.76	
16	Lei Iat Heng (MAC)	57.40	
17	Joanna Un (MAC)	59.42	
18	Trisha Rhoda Darnayla (PHI)	1:02.97	

==== 200 m ====
28 October

Rank	Athlete	Heats	Final
1st place, gold medalist(s)	Li Jing (CHN)	1:37.23	1:32.41
2nd place, silver medalist(s)	Zhong Jiexia (CHN)	1:36.43	1:33.03
3rd place, bronze medalist(s)	Bae So-hyun (KOR)	1:42.42	1:33.68
4	Anastassiya Zinovyeva (KAZ)	1:43.80	1:35.12
5	Ran Ogata (JPN)	1:41.70	1:39.90
6	Vera Ryabova (KAZ)	1:39.22	1:40.36
7	Yuka Endo (JPN)	1:41.45	1:40.71
8	Liu Hao-min (TPE)	1:41.96	1:41.72
9	Priscillia Gunawan (INA)	1:45.23	
10	Jeon Ah-ram (KOR)	1:45.78	
11	Chu Thị Minh Thúy (VIE)	1:47.35	
12	Desy Ratnasih Dewanti (INA)	1:51.18	
13	Lyllian Grace Banzon (PHI)	1:57.11	
14	Leung Wing Hin (HKG)	1:58.80	
15	Keshia Emmaline Fule (PHI)	2:06.01	
16	Ao Un San (MAC)	2:19.69	

==== 4 × 100 m relay ====
28 October

Rank	Team	Final
1st place, gold medalist(s)	China (CHN)	2:45.89
2nd place, silver medalist(s)	South Korea (KOR)	2:48.06
3rd place, bronze medalist(s)	Japan (JPN)	2:57.16
4	Vietnam (VIE)	2:57.55
5	Indonesia (INA)	3:13.55
6	Macau (MAC)	4:03.39
