= Sepak takraw at the 2007 Asian Indoor Games =

- Venue: Workers Sports Pavilion
- Dates: 31 October – 3 November 2007

Hoop sepak takraw was contested at the 2007 Asian Indoor Games in Macau, China from October 31 to November 3. The competition took place at the Workers Sports Pavilion.

== Medalists ==
Event	Gold	Silver	Bronze
Men	Thailand; Thanaiwat Yoosuk; Saharat Ounumpai; Ekachai Masuk; Sittichai Silathavornwong; Wattana Jaiyan; Chaiya Wattano	Myanmar; Than Zaw Oo; U Thien Zaw Min; Maung Maung Sein; Zaw Zaw Aung; Aung Hliang Moe; Aung Zaw	Indonesia; Hadi Mulyono; Suko Hartono; Yudi Purnomo; Stephanus Sampe; Wisnu Dwi Suhantoro; Edy Suwarno
Men	Thailand; Thanaiwat Yoosuk; Saharat Ounumpai; Ekachai Masuk; Sittichai Silathavornwong; Wattana Jaiyan; Chaiya Wattano	Myanmar; Than Zaw Oo; U Thien Zaw Min; Maung Maung Sein; Zaw Zaw Aung; Aung Hliang Moe; Aung Zaw	Philippines; Danilo Alipan; Harrison Castañares; Joel Carbonilla; Hector Memarion; Metodio Suico; Jerome Santiago
Women	Thailand; Sahattiya Faksra; Jiraporn Choochuen; Kobkul Chinchaiyaphum; Viparat Ruangrat; Kantinan Sochaiyan; Anussara Supakarnkamjorn	Myanmar; Nwe Nwe Htwe; Kyu Kyu Thin; May Zin Phyoe; Naing Naing Win; Phyu Phyu Than; Su Tin Zar Naing	Vietnam; Đỗ Thị Thu Hiền; Nguyễn Thị Hoa; Nguyễn Thị Minh Trang; Nguyễn Thái Linh; Cao Thị Yến; Nguyễn Thị Bắc
Women	Thailand; Sahattiya Faksra; Jiraporn Choochuen; Kobkul Chinchaiyaphum; Viparat Ruangrat; Kantinan Sochaiyan; Anussara Supakarnkamjorn	Myanmar; Nwe Nwe Htwe; Kyu Kyu Thin; May Zin Phyoe; Naing Naing Win; Phyu Phyu Than; Su Tin Zar Naing	Indonesia; Dini Mita Sari; Mega Citra Kusuma; Hasmawati Umar; Jumasiah; Nur Qadriyanti; Alberthin Suryani

== Medal table ==
Rank	Nation	Gold	Silver	Bronze	Total
1	Thailand (THA)	2	0	0	2
2	Myanmar (MYA)	0	2	0	2
3	Indonesia (INA)	0	0	2	2
4	Philippines (PHI)	0	0	1	1
4	Vietnam (VIE)	0	0	1	1
Totals (5 entries)		2	2	4	8

== Results ==
=== Men ===
==== Preliminary round ====
31 October – 1 November

Rank	Team	1st	2nd
1	Myanmar	890	910
2	Thailand	840	770
3	Indonesia	760	580
4	Philippines	510	530
5	Vietnam	360	490
6	Iran	370	480
6	South Korea	470	480
8	Japan	290	340
9	India	280	310
10	Cambodia	250	260
11	Macau	220	140

==== Knockout round ====
Semifinals; 2 November		Final; 3 November
Myanmar	800
Philippines	450	Myanmar	820
Thailand	830	Thailand	920
Indonesia	680

=== Women ===
==== Preliminary round ====
31 October – 1 November

Rank	Team	1st	2nd
1	Myanmar	590	670
2	Thailand	540	610
3	Vietnam	360	550
4	Indonesia	440	350
5	India	140	160
6	Macau	30	40

==== Knockout round ====
Semifinals; 2 November		Final; 3 November
Myanmar	660
Indonesia	400	Myanmar	590
Thailand	580	Thailand	610
Vietnam	490
