= Muaythai at the 2007 Asian Indoor Games =

Muaythai competition

- Venue: East Asian Games Dome
- Dates: 29 October – 3 November 2007

Muaythai at the 2007 Asian Indoor Games was held in Macau East Asian Games Dome, Macau, China from 29 October to 3 November 2007.

== Medalists ==
Event	Gold	Silver	Bronze
Flyweight; 48–51 kg	Chan Kai Tik; Hong Kong	Roland Claro; Philippines	Artit Mennoi; Thailand
Flyweight; 48–51 kg	Chan Kai Tik; Hong Kong	Roland Claro; Philippines	Albert Kujur; India
Bantamweight; 51–54 kg	Supachai Payunhan; Thailand	Brent Velasco; Philippines	Bounma Vongchampa; Laos
Bantamweight; 51–54 kg	Supachai Payunhan; Thailand	Brent Velasco; Philippines	Chan Kai Chung; Hong Kong
Featherweight; 54–57 kg	Weerapon Kwangkhwang; Thailand	Abdullo Hudoyberdiev; Uzbekistan	Zaidi Laruan; Philippines
Featherweight; 54–57 kg	Weerapon Kwangkhwang; Thailand	Abdullo Hudoyberdiev; Uzbekistan	Lamtakhong Phavanhdy; Laos
Lightweight; 57–60 kg	Sanguan Puntuma; Thailand	Zhang Bo; China	Imaduddin Naveed; India
Lightweight; 57–60 kg	Sanguan Puntuma; Thailand	Zhang Bo; China	Ölziibatyn Enkhbayar; Mongolia
Light welterweight 60–63.5 kg	Ruben Sumido; Philippines	Metta Khetnok; Thailand	Sengchanh Sivongsa; Laos
Light welterweight 60–63.5 kg	Ruben Sumido; Philippines	Metta Khetnok; Thailand	Mustapha Yaghmour; Lebanon
Welterweight; 63.5–67 kg	Mavlonbek Kahhorov; Uzbekistan	Hiroki Ishii; Japan	Jalal Motamedi; Iran
Welterweight; 63.5–67 kg	Mavlonbek Kahhorov; Uzbekistan	Hiroki Ishii; Japan	Yaser Abusafiyah; Jordan
Light middleweight 67–71 kg	Artur Kadirkulov; Uzbekistan	Vahid Roshani; Iran	Magsarjavyn Batjargal; Mongolia
Light middleweight 67–71 kg	Artur Kadirkulov; Uzbekistan	Vahid Roshani; Iran	Balakrishna Shekhar Shetty; India
Middleweight; 71–75 kg	Mostafa Abdollahi; Iran	Sandeep Shukla; India	Sayyad Al-Rafai; Kuwait
Middleweight; 71–75 kg	Mostafa Abdollahi; Iran	Sandeep Shukla; India	Wael El-Kaissi; Lebanon
Light heavyweight 75–81 kg	Toshio Matsumoto; Japan	Li Baoming; China	Ali Al-Tamari; Jordan
Light heavyweight 75–81 kg	Toshio Matsumoto; Japan	Li Baoming; China	Mohammed Jabbar; Iraq

== Medal table ==
Rank	Nation	Gold	Silver	Bronze	Total
1	Thailand (THA)	3	1	1	5
2	Uzbekistan (UZB)	2	1	0	3
3	Philippines (PHI)	1	2	1	4
4	Iran (IRI)	1	1	1	3
5	Japan (JPN)	1	1	0	2
6	Hong Kong (HKG)	1	0	1	2
7	China (CHN)	0	2	0	2
8	India (IND)	0	1	3	4
9	Laos (LAO)	0	0	3	3
10	Jordan (JOR)	0	0	2	2
10	Lebanon (LIB)	0	0	2	2
10	Mongolia (MGL)	0	0	2	2
13	Iraq (IRQ)	0	0	1	1
13	Kuwait (KUW)	0	0	1	1
Totals (14 entries)		9	9	18	36

== Results ==
=== 51 kg ===
Quarterfinals; 31 October
Muhammadqodir Sobirov (UZB)	1
Artit Mennoi (THA)	4
Chan Kai Tik (HKG)	RSC
Tserennadmidiin Batbold (MGL)

Semifinals; 1 November
Roland Claro (PHI)	5
Albert Kujur (IND)	0
Artit Mennoi (THA)	2
Chan Kai Tik (HKG)	3

Final; 3 November
Roland Claro (PHI)	0
Chan Kai Tik (HKG)	5

=== 54 kg ===
Quarterfinals; 31 October
Chan Kai Chung (HKG)	RSCH
Ariunboldyn Norov (MGL)
Ozodbek Kasimov (UZB)	0
Supachai Payunhan (THA)	5

Semifinals; 1 November
Bounma Vongchampa (LAO)
Brent Velasco (PHI)	RSCI
Chan Kai Chung (HKG)
Supachai Payunhan (THA)	RSCH

Final; 3 November
Brent Velasco (PHI)	0
Supachai Payunhan (THA)	5

=== 57 kg ===
Quarterfinals; 29 October
Thanawat Khotkaeo (MAC)
Abdullo Hudoyberdiev (UZB)	WO
To Hang Lam (HKG)	2
Lamtakhong Phavanhdy (LAO)	3

Semifinals; 31 October
Weerapon Kwangkhwang (THA)	5
Zaidi Laruan (PHI)	0
Abdullo Hudoyberdiev (UZB)	5
Lamtakhong Phavanhdy (LAO)	0

Final; 3 November
Weerapon Kwangkhwang (THA)	5
Abdullo Hudoyberdiev (UZB)	0

=== 60 kg ===
Quarterfinals; 29 October
Sanguan Puntuma (THA)	5
Jay Olod (PHI)	0
Zhang Bo (CHN)	4
Ali Saher (IRQ)	1
Leong Chi Kit (MAC)	0
Ölziibatyn Enkhbayar (MGL)	5

Semifinals; 31 October
Imaduddin Naveed (IND)
Sanguan Puntuma (THA)	RSCH
Zhang Bo (CHN)	4
Ölziibatyn Enkhbayar (MGL)	1

Final; 3 November
Sanguan Puntuma (THA)	5
Zhang Bo (CHN)	0

=== 63.5 kg ===
Heats; 29 October
Metta Khetnok (THA)	5
Ali Ekranpour (IRI)	0

Quarterfinals; 30 October
Motasem Al-Tahrawi (JOR)	0
Ruben Sumido (PHI)	5
Erdenechuluuny Buyanbat (MGL)	0
Sengchanh Sivongsa (LAO)	5
Mustapha Yaghmour (LIB)	WO
Mohammad Al-Kandari (KUW)
Lao Chu Hoi (MAC)	0
Metta Khetnok (THA)	5

Semifinals; 1 November
Ruben Sumido (PHI)	4
Sengchanh Sivongsa (LAO)	1
Mustapha Yaghmour (LIB)	0
Metta Khetnok (THA)	5

Final; 3 November
Ruben Sumido (PHI)	4
Metta Khetnok (THA)	1

=== 67 kg ===
Heats; 29 October
Haidar Mohammed (IRQ)	0
Fadi Sweidan (LIB)	5

Quarterfinals; 30 October
Kang En (CHN)	0
Mavlonbek Kahhorov (UZB)	5
Jalal Motamedi (IRI)	5
Ng Kuok Kun (MAC)	0
Yaser Abusafiyah (JOR)	RSC
Saoud Al-Asaker (KUW)
Hiroki Ishii (JPN)	WO
Fadi Sweidan (LIB)

Semifinals; 1 November
Mavlonbek Kahhorov (UZB)	5
Jalal Motamedi (IRI)	0
Yaser Abusafiyah (JOR)	0
Hiroki Ishii (JPN)	5

Final; 3 November
Mavlonbek Kahhorov (UZB)	3
Hiroki Ishii (JPN)	2

=== 71 kg ===
Quarterfinals; 30 October
Artur Kadirkulov (UZB)	RSCI
Mustafa Hammad (JOR)
Magsarjavyn Batjargal (MGL)	4
Nour Salman (LIB)	1
Vahid Roshani (IRI)	5
Adel Jawad (IRQ)	0
Balakrishna Shekhar Shetty (IND)	3
Ali Al-Foudari (KUW)	2

Semifinals; 1 November
Artur Kadirkulov (UZB)	5
Magsarjavyn Batjargal (MGL)	0
Vahid Roshani (IRI)	RSCH
Balakrishna Shekhar Shetty (IND)

Final; 3 November
Artur Kadirkulov (UZB)	4
Vahid Roshani (IRI)	1

=== 75 kg ===
Quarterfinals; 30 October
Chu Sio Wa (MAC)
Mostafa Abdollahi (IRI)	KO

Semifinals; 1 November
Sayyad Al-Rafai (KUW)
Sandeep Shukla (IND)	RSCH
Wael El-Kaissi (LIB)
Mostafa Abdollahi (IRI)	RSCH

Final; 3 November
Sandeep Shukla (IND)
Mostafa Abdollahi (IRI)	RSCH

=== 81 kg ===
Quarterfinals; 29 October
Amit Kumar Sonu (IND)
Ali Al-Tamari (JOR)	RSC
Toshio Matsumoto (JPN)	5
Yousef Soltani (IRI)	0
Kassem Daher (LIB)	0
Mohammed Jabbar (IRQ)	5
Nawaf Ahmad (KUW)
Li Baoming (CHN)	RSC

Semifinals; 31 October
Ali Al-Tamari (JOR)	0
Toshio Matsumoto (JPN)	5
Mohammed Jabbar (IRQ)	1
Li Baoming (CHN)	4

Final; 3 November
Toshio Matsumoto (JPN)	5
Li Baoming (CHN)	0
