= Cue sports at the 2007 Asian Indoor Games =

- Venue: Macau East Asian Games Dome
- Dates: 27 October – 2 November 2007

Cue sports at the 2007 Asian Indoor Games was held in Macau East Asian Games Dome, Macau, China from 27 October to 2 November 2007.

== Medalists ==
=== Men ===
Event	Gold	Silver	Bronze
One-cushion singles	Dương Anh Vũ; Vietnam	Nguyễn Sĩ Tường; Vietnam	Tadashi Machida; Japan
English billiards singles	Praprut Chaithanasakun; Thailand	Geet Sethi; India	Peter Gilchrist; Singapore
Nine-ball singles	Fu Jianbo; China	Lương Chí Dũng; Vietnam	Jeong Young-hwa; South Korea
Snooker singles	Mohammed Shehab; United Arab Emirates	Ratchapol Pu-ob-orm; Thailand	Xiao Guodong; China
Snooker team	Hong Kong; Chan Wai Ki; Chan Kwok Ming; Fung Kwok Wai	China; Xiao Guodong; Jin Long; Liu Chuang	India; Yasin Merchant; Alok Kumar; Manan Chandra

=== Women ===
Event	Gold	Silver	Bronze
Eight-ball singles	Tsai Pei-chen; Chinese Taipei	Santhinee Jaisuekul; Thailand	Chihiro Kawahara; Japan
Nine-ball singles	Chang Shu-han; Chinese Taipei	Kim Ga-young; South Korea	Charlene Chai; Singapore
Snooker singles	Bi Zhuqing; China	Santhinee Jaisuekul; Thailand	Jaique Ip; Hong Kong

== Medal table ==
Rank	Nation	Gold	Silver	Bronze	Total
1	China (CHN)	2	1	1	4
2	Chinese Taipei (TPE)	2	0	0	2
3	Thailand (THA)	1	3	0	4
4	Vietnam (VIE)	1	2	0	3
5	Hong Kong (HKG)	1	0	1	2
6	United Arab Emirates (UAE)	1	0	0	1
7	India (IND)	0	1	1	2
7	South Korea (KOR)	0	1	1	2
9	Japan (JPN)	0	0	2	2
9	Singapore (SIN)	0	0	2	2
Totals (10 entries)		8	8	8	24

== Results ==
=== Men ===
==== One-cushion singles ====
Pre-quarterfinals; 27 October
James Lengkang (INA)
Dương Anh Vũ (VIE)	W
Yoichiro Mori (JPN)	W
Udon Khaimuk (THA)
Tan Kiong An (INA)
Tadashi Machida (JPN)	W
Thawat Sujaritthurakarn (THA)
Ahmed Al-Sada (QAT)	W

Quarterfinals; 29 October
Sumit Talwar (IND)
Dương Anh Vũ (VIE)	W
Yoichiro Mori (JPN)	W
Cho Jae-ho (KOR)
Dharminder Lilly (IND)
Tadashi Machida (JPN)	W
Ahmed Al-Sada (QAT)
Nguyễn Sĩ Tường (VIE)	W

Semifinals; 29 October
Dương Anh Vũ (VIE)	W
Yoichiro Mori (JPN)
Tadashi Machida (JPN)
Nguyễn Sĩ Tường (VIE)	W

Gold medal 30 October
Dương Anh Vũ (VIE)	W
Nguyễn Sĩ Tường (VIE)
Bronze medal
Yoichiro Mori (JPN)
Tadashi Machida (JPN)	W

==== English billiards singles ====
Round of 32 – 31 October
Hwang Chul-ho (KOR)	0–3	Praprut Chaithanasakun (THA)
Thawat Sujaritthurakarn (THA)	1–3	Aung Htay (MYA)

Pre-quarterfinals; 31 October
Pankaj Advani (IND)	3
Hekta (INA)	1
Nguyễn Thanh Bình (VIE)	0
Praprut Chaithanasakun (THA)	3
Ali Al-Obaidly (QAT)	1
Ali Abdul-Mohsin (IRQ)	3
Ho Chun Chong (MAC)	0
Aung San Oo (MYA)	3
Peter Gilchrist (SIN)	3
Hasan Manfaluti (INA)	0
Nguyễn Thanh Long (VIE)	1
Aung Htay (MYA)	3
Lee Wan-soo (KOR)	0
Khobala Sirisoma (SRI)	3
Khamis Al-Obaidly (QAT)	0
Geet Sethi (IND)	3

Quarterfinals; 1 November
Pankaj Advani (IND)	2
Praprut Chaithanasakun (THA)	3
Ali Abdul-Mohsin (IRQ)	0
Aung San Oo (MYA)	3
Peter Gilchrist (SIN)	3
Aung Htay (MYA)	1
Khobala Sirisoma (SRI)	2
Geet Sethi (IND)	3

Semifinals; 1 November
Praprut Chaithanasakun (THA)	3
Aung San Oo (MYA)	1
Peter Gilchrist (SIN)	1
Geet Sethi (IND)	3

Gold medal 2 November
Praprut Chaithanasakun (THA)	3
Geet Sethi (IND)	1
Bronze medal
Aung San Oo (MYA)	0
Peter Gilchrist (SIN)	3

==== Nine-ball singles ====
Round of 64 – 30 October
Chan Keng Kwang (SIN)	11–0	Ankhtuyaagiin Delgerkhüü (MGL)
Farhad Shahverdi (IRI)	1–11	Zhang Shuchun (CHN)
Zaid Thweib (JOR)	7–11	Lương Chí Dũng (VIE)
Najeebullah Habibi (AFG)	0–11	Abdullah Afeef (MDV)
Prasanna Pushpakumara (SRI)	3–11	Nitiwat Kanjanasri (THA)
Lee Chen Man (HKG)	11–5	Sayeem Hossain (BAN)
Yukio Akakariyama (JPN)	6–11	Bashar Hussein (QAT)
Wong Tin Hong (MAC)	7–11	Mohammed Obid (UAE)
Nader Khan Sultani (AFG)	10–11	Nguyễn Thành Nam (VIE)
Tepwin Arunnath (THA)	11–4	Mohammed Al-Binali (QAT)
Shervin Rahimi (IRI)	8–11	Jalal Odetalah (JOR)
Lkhagvabazaryn Mönkhbold (MGL)	11–4	Ibrahim Shareef (MDV)
Takashi Uraoka (JPN)	8–11	Au Chi Wai (HKG)
Salman Haroon (BAN)	9–11	Ayhab Hasan (IRQ)
Si Tou Chong Wut (MAC)	10–11	Omar Abdel Sattar (SRI)

Round of 32 – 30–31 October
Yang Ching-shun (TPE)	11–2	Esam Al-Mulla (KSA)
Khaled Al-Mutairi (KUW)	8–11	Dharminder Lilly (IND)
Chan Keng Kwang (SIN)	11–6	Zhang Shuchun (CHN)
Lương Chí Dũng (VIE)	11–2	Abdullah Afeef (MDV)
Nitiwat Kanjanasri (THA)	11–10	Lee Chen Man (HKG)
Bashar Hussein (QAT)	11–9	Mohammed Obid (UAE)
Mohammed Massoud (PLE)	11–0	Firas Kamel (IRQ)
Lee Wan-soo (KOR)	WO	Ricky Yang (INA)
Wu Chia-ching (TPE)	11–6	Shyam Chand (IND)
Helmi Qaid (KSA)	5–11	Fu Jianbo (CHN)
Nguyễn Thành Nam (VIE)	9–11	Tepwin Arunnath (THA)
Jalal Odetalah (JOR)	11–3	Lkhagvabazaryn Mönkhbold (MGL)
Au Chi Wai (HKG)	6–11	Ayhab Hasan (IRQ)
Omar Abdel Sattar (SRI)	2–11	Ali Al-Suwaidi (UAE)
Muhammad Zulfikri (INA)	11–0	Anton Netesov (KGZ)
Ahmad Al-Mutairi (KUW)	5–11	Jeong Young-hwa (KOR)

Pre-quarterfinals; 31 October
Yang Ching-shun (TPE)	11
Dharminder Lilly (IND)	9
Chan Keng Kwang (SIN)	10
Lương Chí Dũng (VIE)	11
Nitiwat Kanjanasri (THA)	11
Bashar Hussein (QAT)	2
Mohammed Massoud (PLE)
Bye
Wu Chia-ching (TPE)	6
Fu Jianbo (CHN)	11
Tepwin Arunnath (THA)	11
Jalal Odetalah (JOR)	10
Ayhab Hasan (IRQ)	9
Ali Al-Suwaidi (UAE)	11
Muhammad Zulfikri (INA)	8
Jeong Young-hwa (KOR)	11

Quarterfinals; 1 November
Yang Ching-shun (TPE)	8
Lương Chí Dũng (VIE)	11
Nitiwat Kanjanasri (THA)	11
Mohammed Massoud (PLE)	1
Fu Jianbo (CHN)	11
Tepwin Arunnath (THA)	9
Ali Al-Suwaidi (UAE)	5
Jeong Young-hwa (KOR)	11

Semifinals; 1 November
Lương Chí Dũng (VIE)	11
Nitiwat Kanjanasri (THA)	8
Fu Jianbo (CHN)	11
Jeong Young-hwa (KOR)	4

Gold medal 1 November
Lương Chí Dũng (VIE)	6
Fu Jianbo (CHN)	11
Bronze medal
Nitiwat Kanjanasri (THA)	7
Jeong Young-hwa (KOR)	11

==== Snooker singles ====
Round of 64 – 27 October
Ali Al-Obaidly (QAT)	4–1	Salman Haroon (BAN)
Nguyễn Nhật Thanh (VIE)	4–2	Ahmad Al-Okaily (JOR)
Issara Kachaiwong (THA)	4–0	Niraj Thapa Magar (NEP)
Yutaka Fukuda (JPN)	4–3	Ieng San Fat (MAC)
Nawaf Al-Hamli (KUW)	3–4	Lee Wan-soo (KOR)
Mohsen Bukshaisha (QAT)	3–4	Mohammed Al-Jokar (UAE)
Reenat Walem (IRQ)	4–0	Wong Tin Hong (MAC)
Khurram Hussain Agha (PAK)	4–1	Ahmed Aseeri (KSA)
Yusuke Tanaka (JPN)	0–4	Keith E (SIN)

Round of 32 – 27 October
Xiao Guodong (CHN)	4–0	Firas Kamel (IRQ)
Shahull Hameed Aslam (SRI)	4–2	Nezar Aseeri (KSA)
Ali Al-Obaidly (QAT)	4–3	Munther Al-Basri (BRN)
Nguyễn Nhật Thanh (VIE)	0–4	Naveen Perwani (PAK)
Issara Kachaiwong (THA)	4–3	Peter Gilchrist (SIN)
Yutaka Fukuda (JPN)	4–2	Hekta (INA)
Lee Wan-soo (KOR)	0–4	Chan Wai Ki (HKG)
Yasin Merchant (IND)	2–4	Mohammed Shehab (UAE)
Ratchapol Pu-ob-orm (THA)	4–0	Ryan Somaratne (SRI)
Ashraf Al-Damen (JOR)	0–4	Habib Subah (BRN)
Mohammed Al-Jokar (UAE)	4–0	Ahmad Al-Tarkait (KUW)
Reenat Walem (IRQ)	4–0	Saroj Kumar Mulmi (NEP)
Khurram Hussain Agha (PAK)	1–4	Alok Kumar (IND)
Keith E (SIN)	4–2	Fung Kwok Wai (HKG)
Nguyễn Phúc Long (VIE)	1–4	Hasan Manfaluti (INA)
Hwang Chul-ho (KOR)	0–4	Jin Long (CHN)

Pre-quarterfinals; 28 October
Xiao Guodong (CHN)	4
Shahull Hameed Aslam (SRI)	0
Ali Al-Obaidly (QAT)	0
Naveen Perwani (PAK)	4
Issara Kachaiwong (THA)	4
Yutaka Fukuda (JPN)	0
Chan Wai Ki (HKG)	1
Mohammed Shehab (UAE)	4
Ratchapol Pu-ob-orm (THA)	4
Habib Subah (BRN)	1
Mohammed Al-Jokar (UAE)	1
Reenat Walem (IRQ)	4
Alok Kumar (IND)	2
Keith E (SIN)	4
Hasan Manfaluti (INA)	0
Jin Long (CHN)	4

Quarterfinals; 28 October
Xiao Guodong (CHN)	4
Naveen Perwani (PAK)	3
Issara Kachaiwong (THA)	1
Mohammed Shehab (UAE)	4
Ratchapol Pu-ob-orm (THA)	4
Reenat Walem (IRQ)	2
Keith E (SIN)	1
Jin Long (CHN)	4

Semifinals; 29 October
Xiao Guodong (CHN)	3
Mohammed Shehab (UAE)	4
Ratchapol Pu-ob-orm (THA)	4
Jin Long (CHN)	2

Gold medal 29 October
Mohammed Shehab (UAE)	4
Ratchapol Pu-ob-orm (THA)	3
Bronze medal
Xiao Guodong (CHN)	4
Jin Long (CHN)	2

==== Snooker team ====
Round of 32 – 30 October
Bahrain	2–3	Vietnam
United Arab Emirates	3–0	Kuwait
Thailand	3–0	Macau

Pre-quarterfinals; 30 October
China	3
Jordan	0
Vietnam	2
United Arab Emirates	3
Iraq	3
Pakistan	1
South Korea	0
Saudi Arabia	3
India	3
Sri Lanka	0
Japan	1
Thailand	3
Qatar	3
Indonesia	0
Singapore	1
Hong Kong	3

Quarterfinals; 31 October
China	3
United Arab Emirates	1
Iraq	1
Saudi Arabia	3
India	3
Thailand	2
Qatar	0
Hong Kong	3

Semifinals; 31 October
China	3
Saudi Arabia	1
India	2
Hong Kong	3

Gold medal 31 October
China	0
Hong Kong	3
Bronze medal
Saudi Arabia	2
India	3

=== Women ===
==== Eight-ball singles ====
Round of 32 – 27 October
Amy Hoe (SIN)	7–6	Park Eun-ji (KOR)
Santhinee Jaisuekul (THA)	7–2	Pan Xiaoting (CHN)
Molrudee Vujanic (THA)	7–0	Huỳnh Thị Ngọc Huyền (VIE)
Yukiko Hamanishi (JPN)	7–4	Li Jia (CHN)

Pre-quarterfinals; 27 October
Chang Shu-han (TPE)	7
Ng On Yee (HKG)	1
Chihiro Kawahara (JPN)	7
Amy Hoe (SIN)	4
Santhinee Jaisuekul (THA)	7
Dương Thúy Vi (VIE)	0
Poppy Puspita Neviyanti (INA)	3
Anuja Chandra (IND)	7
Tsai Pei-chen (TPE)	7
Jaique Ip (HKG)	1
Charlene Chai (SIN)	2
Molrudee Vujanic (THA)	7
Desak Raka Kasih Ariati (INA)	3
Yukiko Hamanishi (JPN)	7
Noemie Lok (MAC)	0
Kim Ga-young (KOR)	7

Quarterfinals; 27 October
Chang Shu-han (TPE)	4
Chihiro Kawahara (JPN)	7
Santhinee Jaisuekul (THA)	7
Anuja Chandra (IND)	3
Tsai Pei-chen (TPE)	7
Molrudee Vujanic (THA)	5
Yukiko Hamanishi (JPN)	7
Kim Ga-young (KOR)	6

Semifinals; 28 October
Chihiro Kawahara (JPN)	6
Santhinee Jaisuekul (THA)	7
Tsai Pei-chen (TPE)	7
Yukiko Hamanishi (JPN)	5

Gold medal 28 October
Santhinee Jaisuekul (THA)	6
Tsai Pei-chen (TPE)	7
Bronze medal
Chihiro Kawahara (JPN)	7
Yukiko Hamanishi (JPN)	2

==== Nine-ball singles ====
Round of 32 – 29 October
Jaique Ip (HKG)	1–7	Angeline Ticoalu (INA)
Li Jia (CHN)	6–7	Charlene Chai (SIN)
Tsai Pei-chen (TPE)	5–7	Santhinee Jaisuekul (THA)
Amy Hoe (SIN)	3–7	Chihiro Kawahara (JPN)

Pre-quarterfinals; 29 October
Chang Shu-han (TPE)	7
Huỳnh Thị Ngọc Huyền (VIE)	0
Molrudee Vujanic (THA)	6
Angeline Ticoalu (INA)	7
Charlene Chai (SIN)	7
Chitra Magimairaj (IND)	5
Yukiko Hamanishi (JPN)	7
Park Eun-ji (KOR)	5
Ng On Yee (HKG)	7
Dương Thúy Vi (VIE)	0
Sri Wahyuni (INA)	3
Santhinee Jaisuekul (THA)	7
Chihiro Kawahara (JPN)	3
Kim Ga-young (KOR)	7
Kou Weng Nga (MAC)	0
Pan Xiaoting (CHN)	7

Quarterfinals; 29 October
Chang Shu-han (TPE)	7
Angeline Ticoalu (INA)	2
Charlene Chai (SIN)	7
Yukiko Hamanishi (JPN)	3
Ng On Yee (HKG)	3
Santhinee Jaisuekul (THA)	7
Kim Ga-young (KOR)	7
Pan Xiaoting (CHN)	5

Semifinals; 30 October
Chang Shu-han (TPE)	7
Charlene Chai (SIN)	2
Santhinee Jaisuekul (THA)	3
Kim Ga-young (KOR)	7

Gold medal 30 October
Chang Shu-han (TPE)	7
Kim Ga-young (KOR)	5
Bronze medal
Charlene Chai (SIN)	7
Santhinee Jaisuekul (THA)	5

==== Snooker singles ====
Pre-quarterfinals; 1 November
Vidya Pillai (IND)	3
Chan Kit Ieng (MAC)	0
Bi Zhuqing (CHN)	3
Nicha Pathomekmongkhon (THA)	0
Shi Chunxia (CHN)	1
Santhinee Jaisuekul (THA)	3
Jaique Ip (HKG)	3
Kim Ga-young (KOR)	0

Quarterfinals; 2 November
Park Eun-ji (KOR)	3
Vidya Pillai (IND)	2
Bi Zhuqing (CHN)	3
Ng On Yee (HKG)	2
Charlene Chai (SIN)	0
Santhinee Jaisuekul (THA)	3
Jaique Ip (HKG)	3
Noemie Lok (MAC)	0

Semifinals; 2 November
Park Eun-ji (KOR)	0
Bi Zhuqing (CHN)	3
Santhinee Jaisuekul (THA)	3
Jaique Ip (HKG)	1

Gold medal 2 November
Bi Zhuqing (CHN)	3
Santhinee Jaisuekul (THA)	1
Bronze medal
Park Eun-ji (KOR)	0
Jaique Ip (HKG)	3
