= Roller sports at the 2007 Asian Indoor Games =

Skating and skateboarding competitions in Macau, China

- Venue: MUST Pavilion
- Dates: 26 October – 2 November 2007

Roller sports (as Extreme sports) at the 2007 Asian Indoor Games was held in MUST Pavilion, Macau, China from 26 October to 2 November 2007.

== Medalists ==
=== Aggressive inline ===
Event	Gold	Silver	Bronze
Big air	Jeerasak Tassorn; Thailand	Fariq Mohamed Esa; Malaysia	Norachai Boonnim; Thailand
Park	Jeerasak Tassorn; Thailand	Worapoj Boonnim; Thailand	Hung Chien-kai; Chinese Taipei
Park best trick	Jeerasak Tassorn; Thailand	Worapoj Boonnim; Thailand	Hung Chien-kai; Chinese Taipei
Vert	Yusuke Aihara; Japan	Kanta Ogino; Japan	Hung Chien-kai; Chinese Taipei

=== Skateboarding ===
Event	Gold	Silver	Bronze
Park	Putu Yogi Darmawan; Indonesia	Jirawat Paoin; Thailand	Pevi Permana Putra; Indonesia
Park best trick	Che Lin; China	Weerayut Eksirasuwan; Thailand	Ahmad Fadzil Musa; Malaysia

== Medal table ==
Rank	Nation	Gold	Silver	Bronze	Total
1	Thailand (THA)	3	4	1	8
2	Japan (JPN)	1	1	0	2
3	Indonesia (INA)	1	0	1	2
4	China (CHN)	1	0	0	1
5	Malaysia (MAS)	0	1	1	2
6	Chinese Taipei (TPE)	0	0	3	3
Totals (6 entries)		6	6	6	18

== Results ==
=== Aggressive inline ===
==== Big air ====
28 October

Rank	Athlete	Height
1st place, gold medalist(s)	Jeerasak Tassorn (THA)	4.05^{4.10}
2nd place, silver medalist(s)	Fariq Mohamed Esa (MAS)	4.05^{X}
3rd place, bronze medalist(s)	Norachai Boonnim (THA)	4.00
4	Hung Chien-kai (TPE)	3.80
4	Nik Suhaily Bahari (MAS)	3.80
4	Wang Wei-chieh (TPE)	3.80
7	Alexander Tsui (HKG)	3.40
8	Yang Yundong (CHN)	3.20
8	Masoud Vahedi (IRI)	3.20
10	Cheng Tze Wang (HKG)	3.00
11	Arash Salmanpour (IRI)	NM

==== Park ====
26–28 October

Rank	Athlete	Prel.	Final
1st place, gold medalist(s)	Jeerasak Tassorn (THA)	71.33	79.00
2nd place, silver medalist(s)	Worapoj Boonnim (THA)	75.33	76.00
3rd place, bronze medalist(s)	Hung Chien-kai (TPE)	69.66	72.33
4	Cheng Kai-chin (TPE)	65.66	63.83
5	Yang Yundong (CHN)	57.83	63.33
6	Alexander Tsui (HKG)	52.33	63.00
7	Fariq Mohamed Esa (MAS)	61.33	61.33
8	Cheng Tze Wang (HKG)	60.66	57.33
9	Rashid Al-Julabi (KUW)	47.66	53.50
10	Ali Bandari (IRI)	50.16	40.00
11	Ardeshir Ghovanloupour (IRI)	47.00	
12	Khaled Bandar (KUW)	47.00	

==== Park best trick ====
27 October

Rank	Athlete	Score
1st place, gold medalist(s)	Jeerasak Tassorn (THA)	90
2nd place, silver medalist(s)	Worapoj Boonnim (THA)	80
3rd place, bronze medalist(s)	Hung Chien-kai (TPE)	70
4	Ardeshir Ghovanloupour (IRI)	50
4	Khaled Bandar (KUW)	50
4	Yang Yundong (CHN)	50
4	Chui Wai Chung (HKG)	50
4	Ali Bandari (IRI)	50
4	Cheng Tze Wang (HKG)	50
4	Nik Suhaily Bahari (MAS)	50
4	Cheng Kai-chin (TPE)	50
4	Rashid Al-Julabi (KUW)	50

==== Vert ====
31 October – 2 November

Rank	Athlete	Prel.	Final
1st place, gold medalist(s)	Yusuke Aihara (JPN)	67.50	69.66
2nd place, silver medalist(s)	Kanta Ogino (JPN)	66.00	66.33
3rd place, bronze medalist(s)	Hung Chien-kai (TPE)	55.00	64.33
4	Wang Wei-chieh (TPE)	56.66	59.83
5	Worapoj Boonnim (THA)	56.66	59.66
6	Suravash Vairojanakich (THA)	59.00	56.83
7	Yang Yundong (CHN)	55.33	54.66
8	Arash Salmanpour (IRI)	47.66	48.00
9	Masoud Vahedi (IRI)	44.33	47.00
10	Li Chung Too (HKG)	43.33	44.66

=== Skateboarding ===
==== Park ====
27–28 October

Rank	Athlete	Prel.	Final
1st place, gold medalist(s)	Putu Yogi Dharmawan (INA)	80.50	77.00
2nd place, silver medalist(s)	Jirawat Paoin (THA)	76.92	76.57
3rd place, bronze medalist(s)	Pevi Permana Putra (INA)	78.30	74.10
4	Che Lin (CHN)	81.00	73.66
5	Firdaus Abdul Rahman (SIN)	63.33	73.00
6	Nazeer Hussin (SIN)	70.66	72.16
7	Johary Fitry Khairuddin (MAS)	71.33	71.68
8	Idzham Abdul Rahman (MAS)	71.41	67.00
9	Luciano Castiho Lameiras (MAC)	62.00	65.16
10	Chen Chia-hui (TPE)	67.33	62.66
11	Sutat Siriwat (THA)	60.83	
12	Xie Wenkai (CHN)	57.66	
13	Sasan Sadeghpour (IRI)	54.00	
14	Lee Chi On (HKG)	53.00	
15	Mohammad Javad Rahimi (IRI)	46.33	
16	Luk Chun Yin (HKG)	43.00	

==== Park best trick ====
27 October

Rank	Athlete	Score
1st place, gold medalist(s)	Che Lin (CHN)	90
2nd place, silver medalist(s)	Weerayut Eksirasuwan (THA)	80
3rd place, bronze medalist(s)	Ahmad Fadzil Musa (MAS)	70
4	Anak Agung Bagus Kurniawan (INA)	50
4	Chen Chia-hui (TPE)	50
4	Lee Chi On (HKG)	50
4	Surasak Tasana (THA)	50
4	Ilyas Mat (MAS)	50
4	Firdaus Abdul Rahman (SIN)	50
4	Indra Gandhi (INA)	50
4	Xie Wenkai (CHN)	50
4	Mohammad Javad Rahimi (IRI)	50
4	Nazeer Hussin (SIN)	50
4	Sasan Sadeghpour (IRI)	50
4	Luk Chun Yin (HKG)	50
4	Luciano Castiho Lameiras (MAC)	50
