= Aihara =

Aihara may refer to:

- Aihara (surname), a Japanese surname
- Aihara-machi, a village in Machida, Tokyo, Japan
- Aihara Station, a railway station in Machida
