= Aihara (surname) =

Aihara (written: 相原 or 粟飯原) is a Japanese surname. Notable people with the surname include:

- Koji Aihara (相原 コージ, born 1963), Japanese manga artist
- Kumiko Aihara (相原 久美子, born 1947), Japanese politician
- Miki Aihara (相原 実貴), Japanese manga artist
- Nobuyuki Aihara (相原 信行, 1934 – 2013), Japanese gymnast
- Shohei Aihara (粟飯原 尚平, born 1996), Japanese footballer
- Yusuke Aihara (born 1994), Japanese professional vert skater
- Yutaka Aihara (相原 豊, born 1970), Japanese gymnast

== Fictional characters ==
- Aihara is used as an alias for Shuichi Aizawa in Death Note
- Kotoko Aihara, the female protagonist in Itazura na Kiss
- Aihara Mei and Aihara Yuzu in Citrus (manga)
- Mao Aihara (相原 魔王), a character in anime and manga series Haikyū!!
