= Bowling at the 2007 Asian Indoor Games =

Event held at Bowling Centre, Macau, China

- Venue: Bowling Centre
- Dates: 27 October – 2 November 2007

Bowling at the 2007 Asian Indoor Games was held in Bowling Centre, Macau, China from 27 October to 2 November 2007.

== Medalists ==
=== Men ===
Event	Gold	Silver	Bronze
Singles	Nayef Eqab; United Arab Emirates	Kim Hyun-suk; South Korea	Choi Bok-eum; South Korea
Singles	Nayef Eqab; United Arab Emirates	Kim Hyun-suk; South Korea	Khaled Al-Debayyan; Kuwait
Doubles	South Korea; Choi Bok-eum; Park Min-su	Thailand; Yannaphon Larpapharat; Somjed Kusonphithak	Japan; Daiki Ikeda; Masaaki Takemoto
Doubles	South Korea; Choi Bok-eum; Park Min-su	Thailand; Yannaphon Larpapharat; Somjed Kusonphithak	United Arab Emirates; Nayef Eqab; Shaker Ali Al-Hassan
Team of 4	South Korea; Choi Bok-eum; Park Min-su; Kim Kwang-wook; Kim Hyun-suk	Qatar; Saeed Al-Hajri; Abdulla Al-Qattan; Mubarak Al-Merikhi; Fahad Al-Emadi	Japan; Tomoyuki Sasaki; Masaru Ito; Daiki Ikeda; Masaaki Takemoto
Team of 4	South Korea; Choi Bok-eum; Park Min-su; Kim Kwang-wook; Kim Hyun-suk	Qatar; Saeed Al-Hajri; Abdulla Al-Qattan; Mubarak Al-Merikhi; Fahad Al-Emadi	Thailand; Phoemphun Yakasem; Surasak Manuwong; Somjed Kusonphithak; Yannaphon Larpapharat

=== Women ===
Event	Gold	Silver	Bronze
Singles	Choi Jin-a; South Korea	Zatil Iman; Malaysia	Yang Suiling; China
Singles	Choi Jin-a; South Korea	Zatil Iman; Malaysia	Haruka Matsuda; Japan
Doubles	South Korea; Gang Hye-eun; Gye Min-young	South Korea; Choi Jin-a; Kim Yeau-jin	China; Chen Dongdong; Wu Suqin
Doubles	South Korea; Gang Hye-eun; Gye Min-young	South Korea; Choi Jin-a; Kim Yeau-jin	China; Zhang Yuhong; Yang Suiling
Team of 4	South Korea; Choi Jin-a; Kim Yeau-jin; Gang Hye-eun; Gye Min-young	China; Chen Dongdong; Wu Suqin; Zhang Yuhong; Yang Suiling	Japan; Haruka Matsuda; Kumi Tsuzawa; Kanako Ishimine; Ayano Katai
Team of 4	South Korea; Choi Jin-a; Kim Yeau-jin; Gang Hye-eun; Gye Min-young	China; Chen Dongdong; Wu Suqin; Zhang Yuhong; Yang Suiling	Malaysia; Zatil Iman; Jane Sin; Trish Khoo; Norhanizah Abu Bakar

== Medal table ==
Rank	Nation	Gold	Silver	Bronze	Total
1	South Korea (KOR)	5	2	1	8
2	United Arab Emirates (UAE)	1	0	1	2
3	China (CHN)	0	1	3	4
4	Malaysia (MAS)	0	1	1	2
4	Thailand (THA)	0	1	1	2
6	Qatar (QAT)	0	1	0	1
7	Japan (JPN)	0	0	4	4
8	Kuwait (KUW)	0	0	1	1
Totals (8 entries)		6	6	12	24

== Results ==
=== Men ===
==== Singles ====
27 October

===== Preliminary =====
Rank	Athlete	Score
1	Choi Bok-eum (KOR)	1454
2	Kim Hyun-suk (KOR)	1428
3	Khaled Al-Debayyan (KUW)	1394
4	Hussain Nasir Al-Suwaidi (UAE)	1375
5	Nayef Eqab (UAE)	1374
6	Mohd Nur Aiman (MAS)	1373
7	Shaker Ali Al-Hassan (UAE)	1347
8	Tomoyuki Sasaki (JPN)	1347
9	Hassan Al-Shaikh (KSA)	1332
10	Yang Wei (CHN)	1326
11	Kim Kwang-wook (KOR)	1317
12	Somjed Kusonphithak (THA)	1311
13	Cheng Peng Sheng (MAC)	1307
14	Hsiao Chun-ho (TPE)	1305
15	Chester King (PHI)	1293
16	Daiki Ikeda (JPN)	1290
17	Mubarak Al-Merikhi (QAT)	1288
18	Raoul Miranda (PHI)	1273
19	Jonathan Lim (MAS)	1271
20	Park Min-su (KOR)	1260
21	Saeed Al-Hajri (QAT)	1255
22	Abdulla Al-Qattan (QAT)	1253
23	Fahad Al-Emadi (QAT)	1251
24	Surasak Manuwong (THA)	1247
25	Ahmed Mohamed Raheemi (BRN)	1241
26	Wu Siu Hong (HKG)	1240
27	Cheng Hsing-chao (TPE)	1238
28	Basel Al-Anzi (KUW)	1238
29	Oscar (INA)	1235
30	Masaru Ito (JPN)	1234
31	Zaid Izlan (MAS)	1231
32	Sayed Ibrahim Al-Hashemi (UAE)	1231
33	Haqi Rumandung (INA)	1226
34	Daniel Yiu (HKG)	1219
35	Salem Al-Hajras (KUW)	1216
36	Jia Ling (CHN)	1214
37	Bader Al-Shaikh (KSA)	1214
38	Lin Yu-chien (TPE)	1207
39	Sergey Sapov (UZB)	1197
40	Yusuf Mohamed Falah (BRN)	1196
41	Rajmohan Palaniappan (IND)	1188
42	Jasem Al-Saqer (KUW)	1185
43	Lok Hei Ieong (MAC)	1177
44	Syaherezan Fajrin (MAS)	1167
45	Yannaphon Larpapharat (THA)	1163
46	Feng Nan (CHN)	1161
47	Cheng Gong (CHN)	1157
48	Tik Bahadur Gurung (NEP)	1156
49	Choi Io Fai (MAC)	1153
50	Cyrus Cheung (HKG)	1137
51	Lei Hok Hin (MAC)	1130
52	Chen Yung-chuan (TPE)	1125
53	Rajkumar Ranjit (NEP)	1124
54	Hossein Omidali (IRI)	1123
55	Eric Tseng (HKG)	1121
56	Rangga Dwichandra Yudhira (INA)	1119
57	Dennis Ranova Pulunggono (INA)	1115
58	Masaaki Takemoto (JPN)	1114
59	Ajay Singh (IND)	1111
60	Faisal Al-Juraifani (KSA)	1108
61	Fadi Al-Towireb (KSA)	1107
62	Ernesto Garchallian (PHI)	1099
63	Vijay Punjabi (IND)	1094
64	Phoemphun Yakasem (THA)	1086
65	Markwin Tee (PHI)	1069
66	Sam Salimi (IRI)	1066
67	Mohamed Yusuf Hatam (BRN)	1064
68	Girish Ashok Gaba (IND)	1060
69	Ebrahim Oushani (IRI)	1052
70	Kudrat Khilyamov (UZB)	1039
71	Viktor Smirnov (UZB)	1029
72	Bakhodir Arifov (UZB)	1023
73	Husain Ghuloom Mohamed (BRN)	996
74	Hamid Reza Seyed-Azizollah (IRI)	976

===== Knockout round =====
Quarterfinals		Semifinals		Final
Khaled Al-Debayyan (KUW)	235
Mohd Nur Aiman (MAS)	215	Khaled Al-Debayyan (KUW)	195
Tomoyuki Sasaki (JPN)	203	Kim Hyun-suk (KOR)	258
Kim Hyun-suk (KOR)	247			Kim Hyun-suk (KOR)	172
Choi Bok-eum (KOR)	242			Nayef Eqab (UAE)	211
Hassan Al-Shaikh (KSA)	168	Choi Bok-eum (KOR)	191
Nayef Eqab (UAE)	246	Nayef Eqab (UAE)	227
Hussain Nasir Al-Suwaidi (UAE)	190

==== Doubles ====
29 October

===== Preliminary =====
Rank	Team	Score
1	Thailand (THA); Somjed Kusonpithak; Yannaphon Larpapharat	2725
2	South Korea (KOR); Choi Bok-eum; Park Min-su	2718
3	Qatar (QAT); Mubarak Al-Merikhi; Saeed Al-Hajri	2647
4	Malaysia (MAS); Syaherezan Fajrin; Mohd Nur Aiman	2631
5	United Arab Emirates (UAE); Nayef Eqab; Shaker Ali Al-Hassan	2605
6	Japan (JPN); Daiki Ikeda; Masaaki Takemoto	2564
7	Saudi Arabia (KSA); Hassan Al-Shaikh; Bader Al-Shaikh	2532
8	Chinese Taipei (TPE); Cheng Hsing-chao; Hsiao Chun-ho	2510
9	Hong Kong (HKG); Wu Siu Hong; Daniel Yiu	2506
10	South Korea (KOR); Kim Hyun-suk; Kim Kwang-wook	2448
11	Philippines (PHI); Markwin Tee; Ernesto Garchallian	2437
12	Thailand (THA); Surasak Manuwong; Phoemphun Yakasem	2432
13	Bahrain (BRN); Ahmed Mohamed Raheemi; Yusuf Mohamed Falah	2403
14	Qatar (QAT); Fahad Al-Emadi; Abdulla Al-Qattan	2387
15	Hong Kong (HKG); Eric Tseng; Cyrus Cheung	2378
16	China (CHN); Feng Nan; Yang Wei	2377
17	Nepal (NEP); Tik Bahadur Gurung; Rajkumar Ranjit	2374
18	Philippines (PHI); Chester King; Raoul Miranda	2356
19	Kuwait (KUW); Khaled Al-Debayyan; Basel Al-Anzi	2352
20	Uzbekistan (UZB); Sergey Sapov; Viktor Smirnov	2345
21	Chinese Taipei (TPE); Lin Yu-chien; Chen Yung-chuan	2332
22	Iran (IRI); Hossein Omidali; Ebrahim Oushani	2331
23	Japan (JPN); Tomoyuki Sasaki; Masaru Ito	2301
24	Indonesia (INA); Oscar; Haqi Rumandung	2271
25	Iran (IRI); Sam Salimi; Hamid Reza Seyed-Azizollah	2262
26	United Arab Emirates (UAE); Sayed Ibrahim Al-Hashemi; Hussain Nasir Al-Suwaidi	2261
27	Uzbekistan (UZB); Bakhodir Arifov; Kudrat Khilyamov	2259
28	Macau (MAC); Choi Io Fai; Cheng Peng Sheng	2258
29	Malaysia (MAS); Zaid Izlan; Jonathan Lim	2252
30	Indonesia (INA); Rangga Dwichandra Yudhira; Dennis Ranova Pulunggono	2234
31	Saudi Arabia (KSA); Fadi Al-Towireb; Faisal Al-Juraifani	2231
32	Kuwait (KUW); Jasem Al-Saqer; Salem Al-Hajras	2196
33	India (IND); Ajay Singh; Girish Ashok Gaba	2168
34	China (CHN); Jia Ling; Cheng Gong	2154
35	Macau (MAC); Lei Hok Hin; Lok Hei Ieong	2130
36	Bahrain (BRN); Mohamed Yusuf Hatam; Husain Ghuloom Mohamed	2128
37	India (IND); Rajmohan Palaniappan; Vijay Punjabi	2030

===== Knockout round =====
Quarterfinals		Semifinals		Final
Somjed Kusonpithak (THA); Yannaphon Larpapharat (THA)	389
Cheng Hsing-chao (TPE); Hsiao Chun-ho (TPE)	384	Somjed Kusonpithak (THA); Yannaphon Larpapharat (THA)	483
Mubarak Al-Merikhi (QAT); Saeed Al-Hajri (QAT)	402	Daiki Ikeda (JPN); Masaaki Takemoto (JPN)	373
Daiki Ikeda (JPN); Masaaki Takemoto (JPN)	468			Somjed Kusonpithak (THA); Yannaphon Larpapharat (THA)	410
Nayef Eqab (UAE); Shaker Ali Al-Hassan (UAE)	437			Choi Bok-eum (KOR); Park Min-su (KOR)	521
Syaherezan Fajrin (MAS); Mohd Nur Aiman (MAS)	403	Nayef Eqab (UAE); Shaker Ali Al-Hassan (UAE)	369
Hassan Al-Shaikh (KSA); Bader Al-Shaikh (KSA)	406	Choi Bok-eum (KOR); Park Min-su (KOR)	386
Choi Bok-eum (KOR); Park Min-su (KOR)	437

==== Team of 4 ====
===== Preliminary =====
31 October – 1 November

Rank	Team	Score
1	Japan (JPN)	5378
2	Qatar (QAT)	5156
3	Thailand (THA)	5078
4	South Korea (KOR)	5017
5	Kuwait (KUW)	4956
6	Philippines (PHI)	4939
7	United Arab Emirates (UAE)	4924
8	Hong Kong (HKG)	4913
9	Chinese Taipei (TPE)	4833
10	Indonesia (INA)	4790
11	Saudi Arabia (KSA)	4789
12	Malaysia (MAS)	4753
13	Macau (MAC)	4656
14	Bahrain (BRN)	4630
15	China (CHN)	4591
16	Iran (IRI)	4591
17	India (IND)	4514
18	Uzbekistan (UZB)	4240

===== Knockout round =====
2 November

Semifinals		Final
Thailand	777
Qatar	783	Qatar	829
Japan	766	South Korea	922
South Korea	830

=== Women ===
==== Singles ====
28 October

===== Preliminary =====
Rank	Athlete	Score
1	Gye Min-young (KOR)	1349
2	Zatil Iman (MAS)	1332
3	Choi Jin-a (KOR)	1286
4	Haruka Matsuda (JPN)	1265
5	Ayano Katai (JPN)	1247
6	Kim Yeau-jin (KOR)	1247
7	Apple Posadas (PHI)	1235
8	Saowapha Kunaksorn (THA)	1232
9	Yang Suiling (CHN)	1210
10	Norhanizah Abu Bakar (MAS)	1208
11	Josephine Canare (PHI)	1198
12	Gang Hye-eun (KOR)	1194
13	Liza Clutario (PHI)	1184
14	Pratima Hegde (IND)	1182
15	Gunnalada Aree (THA)	1161
16	Chen Dongdong (CHN)	1154
17	Jane Sin (MAS)	1151
18	Chan Weng Sam (MAC)	1149
19	Chan Shuk Han (HKG)	1146
20	Alexandra Foo (MAC)	1146
21	Zhang Yuhong (CHN)	1134
22	Trish Khoo (MAS)	1128
23	Kumi Tsuzawa (JPN)	1128
24	Angkana Netrviseth (THA)	1123
25	Kanako Ishimine (JPN)	1100
26	Sumathi Nallabantu (IND)	1095
26	Wu Suqin (CHN)	1095
28	Angela Josef Holly (PHI)	1089
29	Filomena Choi (MAC)	1087
30	Julia Lam (MAC)	1086
31	Vanessa Fung (HKG)	1080
32	Husanee Chupinji (THA)	1064
32	Katherine Lau (HKG)	1064
34	Sabeena Saleem (IND)	998
35	Sylvia Kong (HKG)	956
36	Sheela Kumari (IND)	916

===== Knockout round =====
Quarterfinals		Semifinals		Final
Saowapha Kunaksorn (THA)	148
Zatil Iman (MAS)	217	Zatil Iman (MAS)	214
Gye Min-young (KOR)	182	Yang Suiling (CHN)	172
Yang Suiling (CHN)	195			Zatil Iman (MAS)	191
Ayano Katai (JPN)	208			Choi Jin-a (KOR)	214
Haruka Matsuda (JPN)	213	Haruka Matsuda (JPN)	156
Choi Jin-a (KOR)	217	Choi Jin-a (KOR)	298
Apple Posadas (PHI)	212

==== Doubles ====
30 October

===== Preliminary =====
Rank	Team	Score
1	South Korea (KOR); Choi Jin-a; Kim Yeau-jin	2556
2	China (CHN); Chen Dongdong; Wu Suqin	2516
3	South Korea (KOR); Gang Hye-eun; Gye Min-young	2496
4	China (CHN); Zhang Yuhong; Yang Suiling	2493
5	Malaysia (MAS); Zatil Iman; Norhanizah Abu Bakar	2455
6	Japan (JPN); Ayano Katai; Kanako Ishimine	2447
7	Hong Kong (HKG); Chan Shuk Han; Vanessa Fung	2424
8	Macau (MAC); Chan Weng Sam; Alexandra Foo	2368
9	Philippines (PHI); Liza Clutario; Angela Josef Holly	2353
10	Philippines (PHI); Apple Posadas; Josephine Canare	2340
11	Malaysia (MAS); Jane Sin; Trish Khoo	2339
12	Thailand (THA); Saowapha Kunaksorn; Angkana Netrviseth	2331
13	Macau (MAC); Filomena Choi; Julia Lam	2309
14	Japan (JPN); Haruka Matsuda; Kumi Tsuzawa	2266
15	Hong Kong (HKG); Katherine Lau; Sylvia Kong	2262
16	Thailand (THA); Husanee Chupinji; Gunnalada Aree	2247
17	India (IND); Sumathi Nallabantu; Pratima Hegde	2064
18	India (IND); Sheela Kumari; Sabeena Saleem	2054

===== Knockout round =====
Quarterfinals		Semifinals		Final
Choi Jin-a (KOR); Kim Yeau-jin (KOR)	401
Chan Weng Sam (MAC); Alexandra Foo (MAC)	371	Choi Jin-a (KOR); Kim Yeau-jin (KOR)	443
Zatil Iman (MAS); Norhanizah Abu Bakar (MAS)	395	Zhang Yuhong (CHN); Yang Suiling (CHN)	413
Zhang Yuhong (CHN); Yang Suiling (CHN)	472			Choi Jin-a (KOR); Kim Yeau-jin (KOR)	381
Gang Hye-eun (KOR); Gye Min-young (KOR)	413			Gang Hye-eun (KOR); Gye Min-young (KOR)	391
Ayano Katai (JPN); Kanako Ishimine (JPN)	340	Gang Hye-eun (KOR); Gye Min-young (KOR)	424
Chan Shuk Han (HKG); Vanessa Fung (HKG)	356	Chen Dongdong (CHN); Wu Suqin (CHN)	341
Chen Dongdong (CHN); Wu Suqin (CHN)	396

==== Team of 4 ====
===== Preliminary =====
31 October – 1 November

Rank	Team	Score
1	South Korea (KOR)	5284
2	Malaysia (MAS)	4887
3	China (CHN)	4841
4	Japan (JPN)	4718
5	Philippines (PHI)	4702
6	Thailand (THA)	4435
7	Hong Kong (HKG)	4434
8	Macau (MAC)	4343
9	India (IND)	4019

===== Knockout round =====
2 November

Semifinals		Final
South Korea	842
Japan	764	South Korea	957
China	793	China	833
Malaysia	720
