= Cycling at the 2007 Asian Indoor Games =

- Venue: Luso-Chinese School Pavilion; MUST Pavilion
- Dates: 26 October – 2 November 2007

Indoor cycling (Artistic cycling and Cycle ball) and BMX freestyle (as part of the extreme sports) at the 2007 Asian Indoor Games was held in Luso-Chinese School Pavilion and MUST Pavilion, Macau, China from 26 October to 2 November 2007.

== Medalists ==
=== BMX freestyle ===
Event	Gold	Silver	Bronze
Big air	Prachaya Iamsa-ard; Thailand	Ng Chee Keong; Singapore	Rungrueang Phamee; Thailand
Flatland	Pakphum Poosa-art; Thailand	Chutchalerm Chaiwirotwit; Thailand	Ahmad Shaiful Aziz; Malaysia
Park	Kiattichai Wanitsakul; Thailand	Chokchai Wanitsakul; Thailand	Li Yun-yi; Chinese Taipei
Park best trick	Chen Han-kun; Chinese Taipei	Kiattichai Wanitsakul; Thailand	Ng Chee Keong; Singapore
Vert	Kiattichai Wanitsakul; Thailand	Chokchai Wanitsakul; Thailand	Chen Han-kun; Chinese Taipei

=== Indoor ===
Event	Gold	Silver	Bronze
Men's singles	Wong Hang Cheong; Macau	Samuel Yu; Hong Kong	Ekkalak Khonchoho; Thailand
Men's pair	Hong Kong; Lo Ting Hin; Samuel Yu	Macau; Antonio Jose Lou; Wong Hang Cheong	Thailand; Thanaporn Jantarasakha; Ekkalak Khonchoho
Women's singles	Kuan Sok Mui; Macau	Tsang Yu Sum; Hong Kong	Mui Ho Yee; Hong Kong
Women's pair	Hong Kong; Lo Wai Man; Mui Ho Yee	Macau; Kuan Sok In; Kuan Sok Mui	Thailand; Amporn Kaewjinda; Somratchani Ketkaeo
Cycle ball	Japan; Ken Hirano; Satoshi Tanaka	Hong Kong; Ho Wing Tai; Lo Man Fai	Thailand; Nopparit Buadum; Thunwa Naknava

== Medal table ==
Rank	Nation	Gold	Silver	Bronze	Total
1	Thailand (THA)	4	4	5	13
2	Hong Kong (HKG)	2	3	1	6
3	Macau (MAC)	2	2	0	4
4	Chinese Taipei (TPE)	1	0	2	3
5	Japan (JPN)	1	0	0	1
6	Singapore (SIN)	0	1	1	2
7	Malaysia (MAS)	0	0	1	1
Totals (7 entries)		10	10	10	30

== Results ==
=== BMX freestyle ===
==== Big air ====
27 October

Rank	Athlete	Height
1st place, gold medalist(s)	Prachaya Iamsa-ard (THA)	4.05
2nd place, silver medalist(s)	Ng Chee Keong (SIN)	4.00
3rd place, bronze medalist(s)	Rungrueang Phamee (THA)	3.80^{3.85}
4	Mathius Adhi Wibowo (INA)	3.80^{X}
5	Chen Han-kun (TPE)	3.70
5	Herman Sulaeman (INA)	3.70

==== Flatland ====
1–2 November

Rank	Athlete	Prel.	Final
1st place, gold medalist(s)	Pakphum Poosa-art (THA)	86.66	94.33
2nd place, silver medalist(s)	Chutchalerm Chaiwirotwit (THA)	86.00	89.66
3rd place, bronze medalist(s)	Ahmad Shaiful Aziz (MAS)	76.66	80.33
4	Hezlan Abdul Ghafar (MAS)	81.00	78.33
5	Chan Man Fung (HKG)	66.33	69.33
6	Herman Sulaeman (INA)	54.00	62.33

==== Park ====
26–28 October

Rank	Athlete	Prel.	Final
1st place, gold medalist(s)	Kiattichai Wanitsakul (THA)	91.33	94.00
2nd place, silver medalist(s)	Chokchai Wanitsakul (THA)	86.00	89.33
3rd place, bronze medalist(s)	Li Yun-yi (TPE)	81.00	83.66
4	Chen Han-kun (TPE)	81.33	80.00
5	Tong Ching Toh (MAS)	72.33	79.00
6	Herman Sulaeman (INA)	71.66	76.66
7	Cheung Wai Hong (HKG)	67.66	76.33
8	Mathius Adhi Wibowo (INA)	78.00	75.00
9	Khoo Boo Ann (SIN)	67.00	73.66
10	Ng Chee Keong (SIN)	74.00	58.33
11	Farit Samsudin (MAS)	64.00	

==== Park best trick ====
28 October

Rank	Athlete	Score
1st place, gold medalist(s)	Chen Han-kun (TPE)	90
2nd place, silver medalist(s)	Kiattichai Wanitsakul (THA)	80
3rd place, bronze medalist(s)	Ng Chee Keong (SIN)	70
4	Farit Samsudin (MAS)	50
4	Herman Sulaeman (INA)	50
4	Chokchai Wanitsakul (THA)	50
4	Mathius Adhi Wibowo (INA)	50
4	Khoo Boo Ann (SIN)	50
4	Cheung Wai Hong (HKG)	50

==== Vert ====
30 October – 2 November

Rank	Athlete	Prel.	Final
1st place, gold medalist(s)	Kiattichai Wanitsakul (THA)	78.00	84.33
2nd place, silver medalist(s)	Chokchai Wanitsakul (THA)	73.33	78.33
3rd place, bronze medalist(s)	Chen Han-kun (TPE)	69.66	70.00
4	Mathius Adhi Wibowo (INA)	59.00	63.33
5	Herman Sulaeman (INA)	57.00	49.33
6	Farit Samsudin (MAS)	48.66	49.33
7	Khoo Boo Ann (SIN)	43.66	

=== Indoor ===
==== Men's singles ====
27 October

Rank	Athlete	Score
1st place, gold medalist(s)	Wong Hang Cheong (MAC)	322.46
2nd place, silver medalist(s)	Samuel Yu (HKG)	320.59
3rd place, bronze medalist(s)	Ekkalak Khonchoho (THA)	259.01
4	Shiro Ashida (JPN)	256.93
5	Thanaporn Jantarasakha (THA)	255.13
6	Lei Fai (MAC)	247.63
7	Fang Zhili (CHN)	204.10
8	Huang Zuoan (CHN)	203.69
—	Yu Pok Man (HKG)	DNS

==== Men's pair ====
27 October

Rank	Team	Score
1st place, gold medalist(s)	Hong Kong (HKG); Lo Ting Hin; Samuel Yu	277.37
2nd place, silver medalist(s)	Macau (MAC); Antonio Jose Lou; Wong Hang Cheong	256.50
3rd place, bronze medalist(s)	Thailand (THA); Thanaporn Jantarasakha; Ekkalak Khonchoho	233.41
4	Hong Kong (HKG); Ip Hin Bon; Yu Pok Man	225.51
5	China (CHN); Fang Zhili; Huang Zuoan	197.33

==== Women's singles ====
27 October

Rank	Athlete	Score
1st place, gold medalist(s)	Kuan Sok Mui (MAC)	292.47
2nd place, silver medalist(s)	Tsang Yu Sum (HKG)	267.40
3rd place, bronze medalist(s)	Mui Ho Yee (HKG)	260.63
4	Kazumi Horii (JPN)	260.42
5	Vong Chi Kei (MAC)	239.82
6	Amporn Kaewjinda (THA)	235.97
7	Phennapha Aramsit (THA)	235.15

==== Women's pair ====
27 October

Rank	Team	Score
1st place, gold medalist(s)	Hong Kong (HKG); Lo Wai Man; Mui Ho Yee	237.16
2nd place, silver medalist(s)	Macau (MAC); Kuan Sok In; Kuan Sok Mui	237.16
3rd place, bronze medalist(s)	Thailand (THA); Amporn Kaewjinda; Somratchani Ketkaeo	233.19
4	Macau (MAC); Choi Weng Ian; Vong Chi Kei	228.99
5	Hong Kong (HKG); Wong Man Huen; Wong Man Yin	228.96
6	Thailand (THA); Phennapha Aramsit; Sukunya Kamnoi	226.97

==== Cycle ball ====
===== Preliminary =====
26 October

Pos	Team	Pld	W	D	L	GF	GA	GD	Pts	HKG	JPN	MAS	THA	MAC
1	Hong Kong	4	3	1	0	22	11	+11	10	—	3–3	4–2	7–2	8–4
2	Japan	4	2	2	0	29	9	+20	8	3–3	—	4–4	6–2	16–0
3	Malaysia	4	2	1	1	22	10	+12	7	2–4	4–4	—	2–1	14–1
4	Thailand	4	1	0	3	12	15	−3	3	2–7	2–6	1–2	—	7–0
5	Macau	4	0	0	4	5	45	−40	0	4–8	0–16	1–14	0–7	—

Source: Official website

===== Knockout round =====
Semifinals
27 October
Hong Kong	5
Thailand	1
27 October
Japan	3
Malaysia	1

Final
27 October
Hong Kong	2
Japan	3
Bronze medal match
27 October
Thailand	2
Malaysia	1
