= Japan at the 2007 Asian Indoor Games =

- IOC code: JPN
- NOC: Japanese Olympic Committee
- Website: www.joc.or.jp

in Macau October 26 - November 3
- Competitors: 102
- Medals Ranked 7th: Gold 8 Silver 7 Bronze 11 Total 26

Asian Indoor Games appearances
- 2005; 2007; 2009; 2013; 2017; 2021; 2025

Japan competed at the 2007 Asian Indoor Games held in Macau, China from 26 October to 3 November 2007. Japan finished seventh with 8 gold medals, 7 silver medals, and 11 bronze medals.

== Medal summary ==
=== Medal table ===
| Sport | Gold | Silver | Bronze | Total |
|---|---|---|---|---|
| Dancesport | 4 | 2 | 4 | 10 |
| Muaythai | 1 | 1 | 0 | 2 |
| Roller sports | 1 | 1 | 0 | 2 |
| Cycling | 1 | 0 | 0 | 1 |
| Futsal | 1 | 0 | 0 | 1 |
| Sport climbing | 0 | 2 | 0 | 2 |
| Finswimming | 0 | 1 | 1 | 2 |
| Bowling | 0 | 0 | 4 | 4 |
| Cue sports | 0 | 0 | 2 | 2 |
| Totals (9 entries) | 8 | 7 | 11 | 26 |

=== Medalists ===
| Medal | Name | Sport | Event | Date |
|---|---|---|---|---|
| Gold | Ken Hirano; Satoshi Tanaka | Cycling | Cycle ball | October 27 |
| Gold | Masayuki Ishihara; Ayami Kubo | Dancesport | Quickstep | October 27 |
| Gold | Masaki Seko; Chiaki Seko | Dancesport | Latino five dances | October 27 |
| Gold | Masaki Seko; Chiaki Seko | Dancesport | Latino jive | October 28 |
| Gold | Masaki Seko; Chiaki Seko | Dancesport | Latino paso doble | October 28 |
| Gold | Yusuke Aihara | Roller sports | Men's vert | November 2 |
| Gold | Tomomi Mori; Tamaki Morikawa; Yui Takahashi; Ryoko Miyakawa; Shihoko Shinohara; Takako Inada; Azumi Fujita; Hiromi Maki; Sakae Honda; Natsumi Iwasaki; Shiori Nakajima; Yukiko Yoshimoto; Mai Nagashima | Futsal | Women's tournament | November 3 |
| Gold | Toshio Matsumoto | Muaythai | Men's light heavyweight | November 3 |
| Silver | Masayuki Ishihara; Ayami Kubo | Dancesport | Slow foxtrot | October 27 |
| Silver | Masayuki Ishihara; Ayami Kubo | Dancesport | Tango | October 27 |
| Silver | Hideaki Sakai | Finswimming | Men's 50 metres | October 27 |
| Silver | Kanta Ogino | Roller sports | Men's vert | November 2 |
| Silver | Sachi Anma | Sport climbing | Men's lead | November 2 |
| Silver | Akiyo Noguchi | Sport climbing | Women's lead | November 2 |
| Silver | Hiroki Ishii | Muaythai | Men's welterweight | November 3 |
| Bronze | Tsuyoshi Nukina; Mariko Shibahara | Dancesport | Viennese waltz | October 27 |
| Bronze | Kazuki Sugaya; Ikuyo Ozaki | Dancesport | Waltz | October 27 |
| Bronze | Kazuki Sugaya; Ikuyo Ozaki | Dancesport | Five dances | October 28 |
| Bronze | Yutaka Kubota; Miyuki Kubota | Dancesport | Latino samba | October 28 |
| Bronze | Chihiro Kawahara | Cue sports | Women's eight-ball | October 28 |
| Bronze | Haruka Matsuda | Bowling | Women's singles | October 28 |
| Bronze | Ran Ogata; Yayoi Sakamoto; Yuka Endo; Sachika Yamasaki | Finswimming | Men's 50 metres | October 28 |
| Bronze | Daiki Ikeda; Masaaki Takemoto | Bowling | Men's doubles | October 29 |
| Bronze | Tadashi Machida | Cue sports | Men's one-cushion | October 30 |
| Bronze | Haruka Matsuda; Kumi Tsuzawa; Kanako Ishimine; Ayano Katai | Bowling | Women's team | November 2 |
| Bronze | Tomoyuki Sasaki; Masaru Ito; Daiki Ikeda; Masaaki Takemoto | Bowling | Men's team | November 2 |
