= Malaysia at the 2007 Asian Indoor Games =

- IOC code: MAS
- NOC: Olympic Council of Malaysia
- Website: www.olympic.org.my (in English)

in Macau
- Medals Ranked 20th: Gold 0 Silver 3 Bronze 6 Total 9

Asian Indoor Games appearances
- 2005; 2007; 2009; 2013; 2017; 2021; 2025

Malaysia participated in the 2007 Asian Indoor Games in Macau, China from 26 October to 3 November 2007.

== Medallists ==
Medal	Name	Sport	Event	Date
Silver	Zatil Iman Abdul Ghani	Bowling	Women's singles	28 October
Silver	Fariq Mohamed Esa	Extreme sports	Inline skate big air	28 October
Silver	Chong Kok Fu; Er Chong Yen; Lwee Wee Chien; Pang Pee Wei; Si Tiam Yong; Te Hwa Chong; Tiong Chun Khai; Wong Lian Khai	Dragon and lion dance	Southern lion optional exercise	2 November
Bronze	Mas Hafizulhelmi	Chess	Men's classical individual	30 October
Bronze	Siti Zulaikha	Chess	Women's classical individual	30 October
Bronze	Norhanizah Abu Bakar; Sin Li Jane; Trish Khoo; Zatil Iman Abdul Ghani	Bowling	Women's team	2 November
Bronze	Ahmad Shaiful Aziz	Extreme sports	BMX freestyle flatland	2 November
Bronze	Ahmad Fadzil Musa	Extreme sports	Skateboard park best technical	27 October
Bronze	Boo Chen Loong; Cher Chin Yong; Chua Khai Ping; Hoo Jenn Shyang; Lau Chin Chuen; Lau Yong Meng; Lim Chap Yeong; Ng Chi Chang; Ng Chi Khai; Ng Per Yuean; Own Yen Ming; Sia Chee Hong; Tan Jiunn Siong; Tan Teck Sien	Dragon and lion dance	Dragon dance optional exercise	2 November
