= Macau Olympic Aquatic Centre =

Swimming venue in Macau

Coordinates: 22.15274°N 113.552885°E

Centro Desportivo Olímpico – Piscina Olímpica 奧林匹克體育中心—游泳館
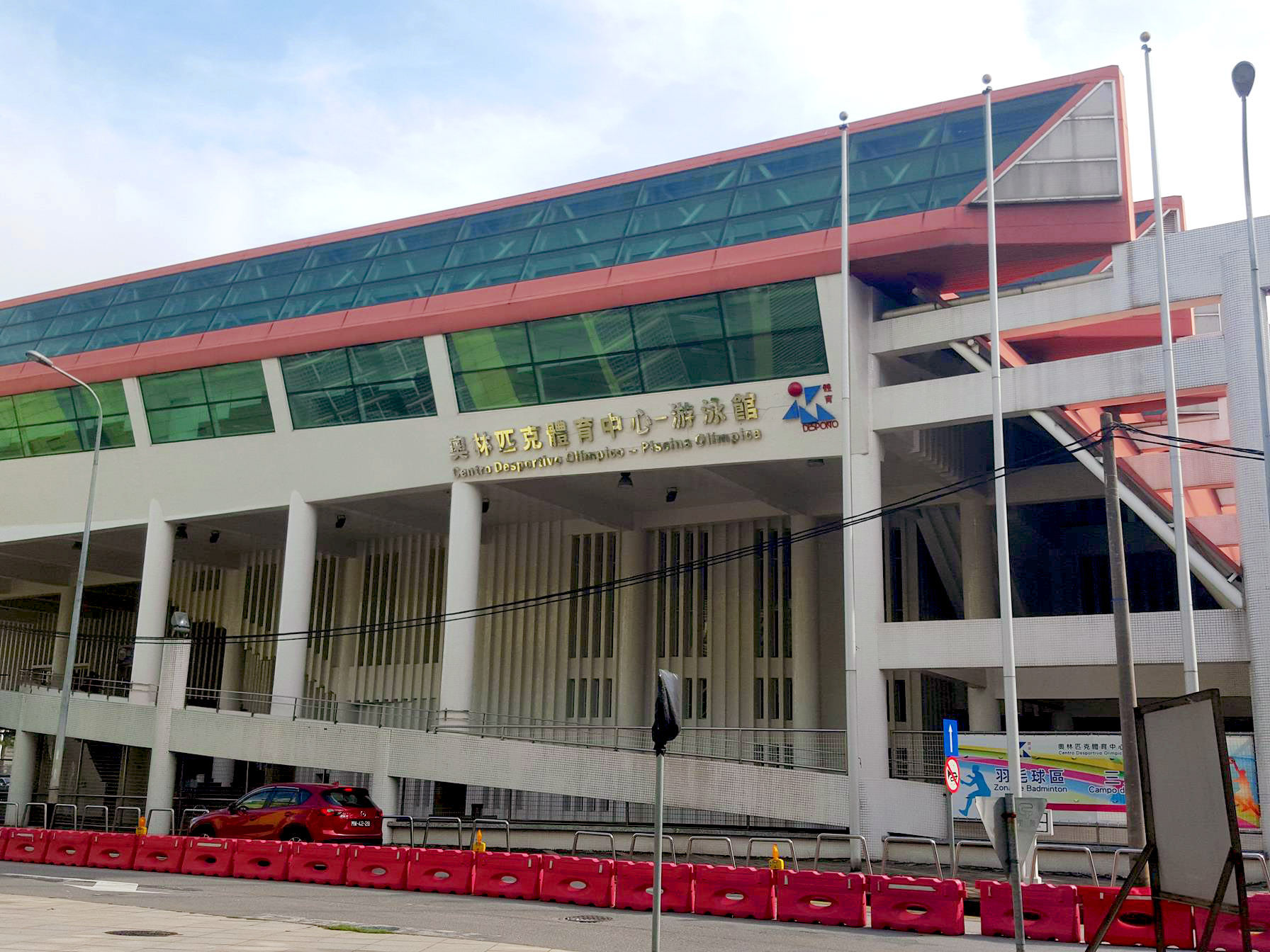
- Interactive map of Centro Desportivo Olímpico – Piscina Olímpica 奧林匹克體育中心—游泳館
- Former names: Macau Olympic Aquatic Centre
- Location: 148 Rua do Desporto, Taipa
- Owner: Government of Macau

Construction
- Groundbreaking: 7 July 2000
- Opened: 28 March 2003

Tenants
- 2005 East Asian Games; 2006 Lusofonia Games; 2007 Asian Indoor Games

The Olympic Sports Centre – Aquatic Centre (Chinese: 奧林匹克體育中心—游泳館; Portuguese: Centro Desportivo Olímpico – Piscina Olímpica), formerly known as Macau Olympic Aquatic Centre (澳門奧林匹克游泳館, Piscina Olimpica de Macau), is an aquatic center in Taipa, Macau.

Inaugurated on March 28, 2003, the aquatic center covers a total area of 3,220 square metres (3,850 sq yd) and has a seating capacity of 1,500. The Aquatic Centre includes a diving pool 25 meters by 25 meters (with an adjustable floor capable of reaching a maximum depth of 5 meters) and a 50m swimming pool with 10 lanes. Both facilities comply with the latest FINA standards and are eligible for holding international competitions. Water quality is maintained by a sophisticated sanitizing system using ozone, instead of chlorine.

== See also ==
- Sports in Macau
