= 2007 Asian Indoor Games =

Multi-sport event in Macau

II Asian Indoor Games
- Host city: Macau
- Motto: Ultimate Asian Power
- Nations: 44
- Athletes: 1,792
- Events: 151 in 17 sports
- Opening: October 26
- Closing: November 3
- Opened by: Edmund Ho; Chief Executive of Macau
- Torch lighter: Chu Chin Tou
- Ceremony venue: Estádio Campo Desportivo

The 2007 Asian Indoor Games (Chinese: 2007年亞洲室內運動會; Portuguese: Jogos Asiáticos em Recinto Coberto de 2007), officially known as the 2nd Asian Indoor Games and also known as Macau 2007, were held in Macau, China from 26 October 2007 to 3 November 2007. Most events of the games took place at the Macao East Asian Games Dome.

The Emblem of the 2nd Asian Indoor Games gives an overall impression of the sun shining above the covered gymnasium.

== Venues ==
- Macau East Asian Games Dome
- Tap Seac Multisport Pavilion
- IPM Multisport Pavilion
- Macau Olympic Aquatic Centre
- Macao Forum
- Pavilhão da Escola Luso-Chinesa
- MUST Pavilion
- Pavilhão dos Trabalhadores

== Participating nations ==
There were 44 Asian countries confirmed to participate in the games.

- Afghanistan (17)
- Bahrain
- Bangladesh (12)
- Bhutan (3)
- Cambodia
- China
- Chinese Taipei
- Hong Kong
- India
- Indonesia
- Iran (133)
- Iraq
- Japan
- Jordan
- Kazakhstan
- Kuwait
- Kyrgyzstan
- Laos
- Lebanon
- Macau
- Malaysia
- Maldives
- Mongolia
- Myanmar
- Nepal
- North Korea (4)
- Oman
- Pakistan
- Palestine (2)
- Philippines
- Qatar
- Saudi Arabia
- Singapore
- South Korea
- Sri Lanka
- Syria
- Tajikistan
- Thailand
- Timor-Leste (15)
- Turkmenistan
- United Arab Emirates
- Uzbekistan
- Vietnam
- Yemen

== Sports ==
A total of 17 sports were scheduled to be competed in this edition of the Indoor Asiad. The following is a list of the sports and the number of the designated events in parentheses.

- Aerobic gymnastics (4)
- Bowling (6)
- Chess sports
  - Chess (9)
  - Xiangqi (4)
- Cue sports (8)
- Dancesport (12)
- Dragon & lion dance (6)
- Esports (3)
- Extreme sports
  - BMX freestyle (5)
  - Roller freestyle (4)
  - Skateboarding (2)
  - Sport climbing (4)
- Finswimming (8)
- Futsal (2)
- Indoor athletics (26)
- Indoor cycling (5)
- Indoor hockey (1)
- Kabaddi (1)
- Muaythai (9)
- Sepak takraw (2)
- Short course swimming (30)

Demonstration sports

- 3x3 basketball (1)
- Kickboxing (15)
- Kurash (4)

== Calendar ==
OC	Opening ceremony	●	Event competitions	1	Event finals	CC	Closing ceremony

October / November 2007		26th Fri	27th Sat	28th Sun	29th Mon	30th Tue	31st Wed	1st Thu	2nd Fri	3rd Sat	Gold medals
Ceremonies		OC								CC	
Aerobic gymnastics		●	●	4							4
Bowling			1	1	1	1	●	●	2		6
Chess sports	Chess	●	3	●	●	1	●	2	2	1	9
Chess sports	Xiangqi		●	●	1	3					4
Cue sports			●	1	1	2	1	1	2		8
Dancesport			6	6							12
Dragon & lion dance								3	3		6
Esports			●	●	●	3					3
Extreme sports	BMX freestyle	●	1	2		●		●	2		5
Extreme sports	Roller freestyle	●	1	2			●		1		4
Extreme sports	Skateboarding		1	1							2
Extreme sports	Sport climbing					2	●	●	2		4
Finswimming			4	4							8
Futsal		●	●	●	●	●	●	●	●	2	2
Indoor athletics						6	8	12			26
Indoor cycling		●	5								5
Indoor hockey		●	●	●	●	●	●	●	1		1
Kabaddi						●	●	●	●	1	1
Muaythai					●	●	●	●		9	9
Sepak takraw							●	●	●	2	2
Short course swimming						8	7	8	7		30
Total gold medals			22	21	3	26	16	26	22	15	151
October / November 2007		26th Fri	27th Sat	28th Sun	29th Mon	30th Tue	31st Wed	1st Thu	2nd Fri	3rd Sat	Gold medals
3x3 basketball										1	1
Kickboxing		●	15								15
Kurash									4		4

== Medal table ==
Official mascot

* Host nation (Macau)

Rank	Nation	Gold	Silver	Bronze	Total
1	China (CHN)	52	26	24	102
2	Thailand (THA)	19	28	22	69
3	Hong Kong (HKG)	15	9	11	35
4	South Korea (KOR)	10	14	13	37
5	Kazakhstan (KAZ)	9	20	13	42
6	India (IND)	9	9	10	28
7	Japan (JPN)	8	7	11	26
8	Iran (IRI)	4	4	9	17
9	Qatar (QAT)	4	3	1	8
10	Chinese Taipei (TPE)	4	2	6	12
11	Macau (MAC)*	3	5	5	13
12	Saudi Arabia (KSA)	3	1	0	4
13	Vietnam (VIE)	2	5	11	18
14	Uzbekistan (UZB)	2	2	2	6
15	Indonesia (INA)	2	0	4	6
16	United Arab Emirates (UAE)	2	0	1	3
17	Kuwait (KUW)	1	3	2	6
18	Singapore (SIN)	1	2	5	8
19	Philippines (PHI)	1	2	3	6
20	Malaysia (MAS)	0	3	6	9
21	Myanmar (MYA)	0	2	0	2
21	Sri Lanka (SRI)	0	2	0	2
23	Mongolia (MGL)	0	1	4	5
24	Pakistan (PAK)	0	1	1	2
25	Kyrgyzstan (KGZ)	0	1	0	1
26	Laos (LAO)	0	0	3	3
27	Jordan (JOR)	0	0	2	2
27	Lebanon (LIB)	0	0	2	2
29	Bangladesh (BAN)	0	0	1	1
29	Iraq (IRQ)	0	0	1	1
29	North Korea (PRK)	0	0	1	1
Totals (31 entries)		151	152	174	477

Preceded by Bangkok	Asian Indoor Games; Macau; II Asian Indoor Games (2007)	Succeeded by Hanoi
