= Macau East Asian Games Dome =

Indoor sporting arena in East Asia

- Chinese: 澳門東亞運動會體育館; Portuguese: Domo dos Jogos da Ásia Oriental
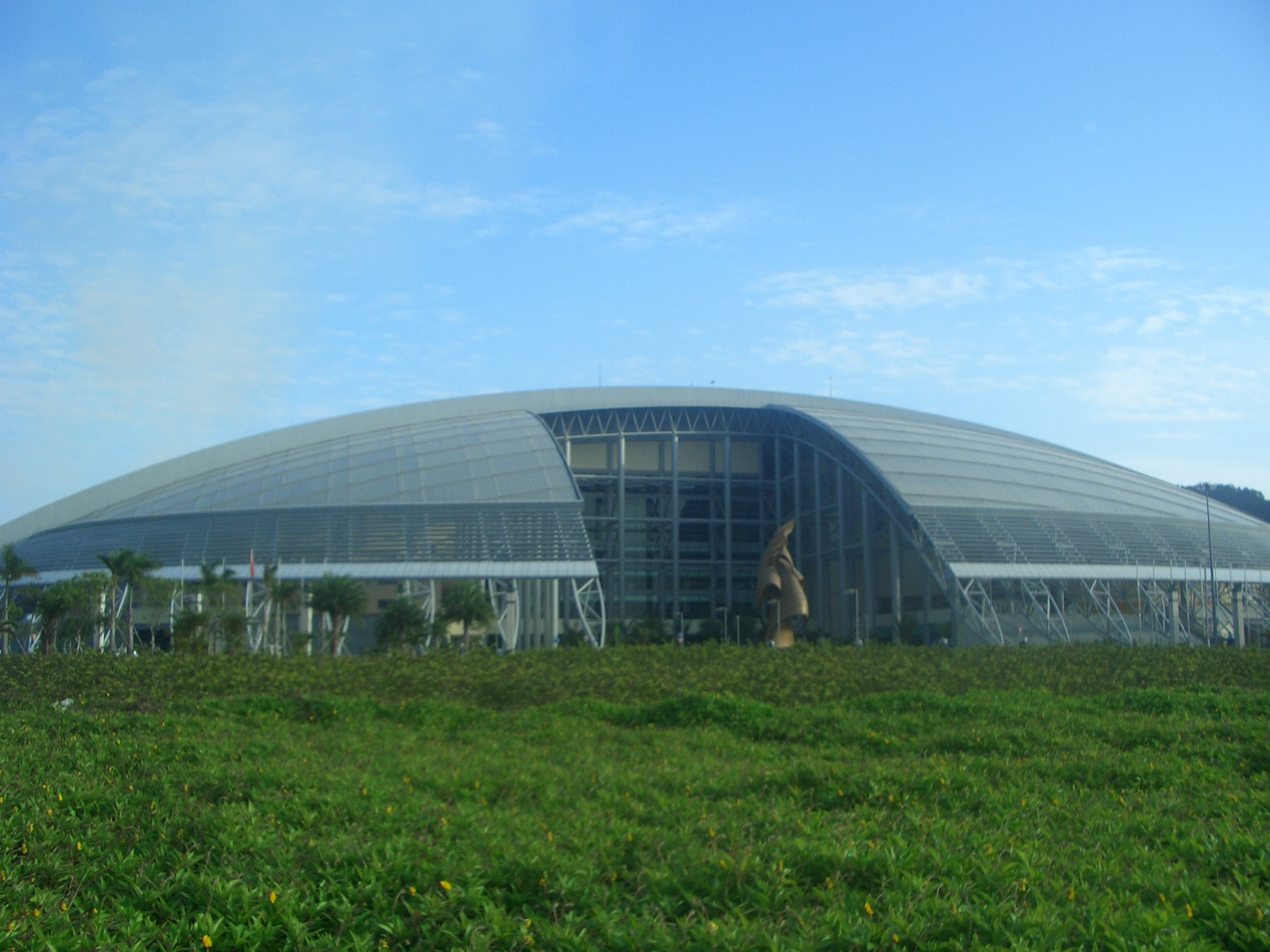
- Interactive map of Macau East Asian Games Dome
- Full name: Macau East Asian Games Dome
- Location: Cotai, Macau, China
- Coordinates: 22°8′26″N 113°34′14″E
- Capacity: 9,000

Construction
- Groundbreaking: 26 May 2005; 21 years ago
- Opened: 8 August 2005; 21 years ago

The East Asian Games Dome (Chinese: 澳門東亞運動會體育館; Portuguese: Domo dos Jogos da Ásia Oriental) is an indoor sporting arena located in Cotai, Macau, China.

== Description ==
The venue was one of the major venues of the 2005 East Asian Games and also hosted some events for the 2007 Asian Indoor Games.

The Macau East Asian Games Dome is the largest indoor sporting facility in the city. It comprises a three-story multi-purpose sporting complex covering a total area of 45,000 m^{2} with two separate functional indoor pavilions, which is ideal for different types of indoor sports and activities. It also consists of a large exhibition hall that can accommodate up to 2,000 people.

Pavilion 1: With a total seating capacity of almost 7,000, one of this pavilion's main features is the dedicated indoor track and field set-up, which is ideal for different activities ranging from ceremonies to sporting events.

Pavilion 2: This pavilion can seat up to 2,000 and is designed with a central stage that offers a U-shaped seat setting. This allows audiences to have a perfect view of the stage, especially suitable for exhibition sports such as dance sport.

== History ==
The venue was officially opened in 2005. Its first stone was laid by the chief executive of Macau, Edmund Ho, on February 28, 2003.

== East Asian Games station ==
The dome is served by the Macau Light Rapid Transit Taipa line's East Asian Games station located at the corner of Av. da Nave Desportiva and R. de Tenis, Macao.

== See also ==
- Sport in Macau
