= Yusuke Aihara =

Japanese professional vert skater

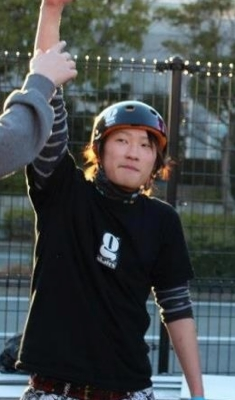

Personal information
- Nationality: Japanese
- Born: April 13, 1994 (age 32) Osaka, Japan

Sport
- Sport: Vert skating
Medal record
Competitions
Representing Japan
Gold medal – first place	2019 Kobe, Japan	Vert
Gold medal – first place	2016 Kobe, Japan	Vert
Bronze medal – third place	2013 Montana, Bulgaria	Vert
Bronze medal – third place	2012 Copenhagen, Denmark	Vert
Bronze medal – third place	2012 Kobe, Japan	Vert
Bronze medal – third place	2012 Shanghai, China	Vert
Silver medal – second place	2011 Kobe, Japan	Vert
Bronze medal – third place	2011 Shanghai, China	Vert
Silver medal – second place	2010 ChunChone, Korea	Vert
Silver medal – second place	2010 Kobe, Japan	Vert
Gold medal – first place	2008 Tehachapi, CA, USA	Vert
Gold medal – first place	2007 Macau, China	Vert

Yusuke Aihara (相原 裕介, Aihara Yūsuke; born 13 April 1994 in Osaka) is a Japanese professional vert skater. Aihara started skating when he was seven years old in 2001 and turned professional in 2008. Aihara has attended many competitions in his vert skating career. He won the All Japan Championships, a silver medal at the World Action Sports B3 Championships, and a bronze medal at the X-GAMES.

Notable tricks: Rocket 540, Frontside 900, Backside 1080.

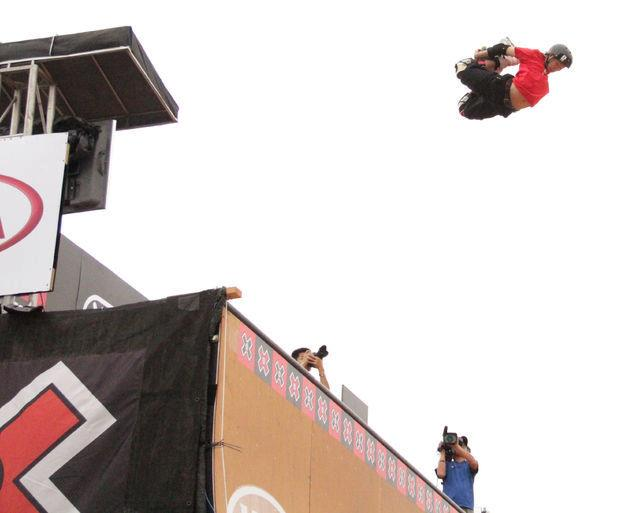
Yusuke Vert Skating

== Vert competitions ==
- 2019 JASPA All Japan Championships, Kobe, Japan - Vert : 1st
- 2016 JASPA All Japan Championships, Kobe, Japan - Vert : 1st
- 2013 EC European Championships, Montana, Bulgaria - Vert: 3rd
- 2012 EC European Championships, Copenhagen, Denmark - Vert: 3rd
- 2012 JASPA All Japan Championships, Kobe, Japan - Vert: 3rd
- 2012 X-GAMES ASIA, Shanghai, China - Vert: 3rd
- 2011 X-GAMES ASIA, Shanghai, China - Vert: 3rd
- 2011 JASPA All Japan Championships, Kobe, Japan - Vert: 2nd
- 2010 World Action Sports B3 Championships, ChunChone, Korea - Vert: 2nd
- 2010 JASPA All Japan Championships, Kobe, Japan - Vert: 2nd
- 2009 X-GAMES ASIA, Shanghai, China - Vert: 5th
- 2008 AIL World Championships, Tehachapi, CA, USA - Vert: 1st
- 2008 JASPA All Japan Championships, Kobe, Japan - Vert: 3rd
- 2007 Asian Indoor Games, Macau, China - Vert: 1st
- 2006 ASA Amateur World Championships, Dallas, USA - Vert: 6th
- 2006 X-GAMES ASIA, Kuala Lumpur, Malaysia - Vert: 8th
