= South Korea at the 2007 Asian Indoor Games =

- IOC code: KOR
- NOC: Korean Olympic Committee

in Macau
- Medals Ranked 4th: Gold 10 Silver 14 Bronze 13 Total 37

Asian Indoor Games appearances
- 2005; 2007; 2009; 2013; 2017; 2021; 2026

South Korea participated in the 2007 Asian Indoor Games in Macau, China, from 26 October to 3 November 2007.

== Medal summary ==
=== Medal table ===
Sport	Gold	Silver	Bronze	Total
Bowling	5	2	1	8
Short course swimming	2	4	5	11
Sport climbing	2	0	1	3
Finswimming	1	4	3	8
Aerobic gymnastics	0	2	1	3
Cue sports	0	1	1	2
Indoor hockey	0	1	0	1
Indoor athletics	0	0	1	1
Totals (8 entries)	10	14	13	37

=== Medalists ===
Medal	Name	Sport	Event	Date
Silver	Kim Ga-young	Cue sports	Women's nine-ball singles	30 October
Silver		Indoor hockey	Men's tournament	2 November
Bronze	Jeong Young-hwa	Cue sports	men's nine-ball singles	1 November
Bronze	Kim Young-min	Indoor athletics	Men's high jump	1 November
