= Philippines at the 2007 Asian Indoor Games =

- IOC code: PHI
- NOC: Philippine Olympic Committee
- Website: www.olympic.ph (in English)

in Macau
- Medals Ranked 19th: Gold 1 Silver 2 Bronze 3 Total 6

Asian Indoor Games appearances
- 2005; 2007; 2009; 2013; 2017; 2021; 2025

The Philippines participated in the 2007 Asian Indoor Games held in Macau, China from 26 October to 3 November 2007.

== Medalists ==
=== Gold ===
No.	Medal	Name	Sport	Event
1	Gold	Ruben Sumido	Muay Thai	Men's Light Welterweight 60–63.5kg

=== Silver ===
No.	Medal	Name	Sport	Event
1	Silver	Rland Claro	Muay Thai	Men's Flyweight 48-51kg
2	Silver	Brent Velasco	Muay Thai	Men's Bantamweight 51-54kg

=== Bronze ===
No.	Medal	Name	Sport	Event
1	Bronze	Zaidi Laruan	Muay Thai	Men's Featherweight 54-57kg
2	Bronze	Catherine Perena	Chess	Women's Individual Rapid
3	Bronze	Danilo Alipan; Harrison Castañares; Joel Carbonilla; Hector Memarion; Metodio Suico; Jerome Santiago	Sepak Takraw	Men's Team

== Medal summary ==
=== By sports ===
Sport	Gold	Silver	Bronze	Total
Muay Thai	1	2	1	4
Chess	0	0	1	1
Sepak takraw	0	0	1	1
Totals (3 entries)	1	2	3	6
