= Iran at the 2007 Asian Indoor Games =

- IOC code: IRI
- NOC: National Olympic Committee of the Islamic Republic of Iran

in Macau
- Competitors: 125 in 14 sports
- Flag bearer: Ehsan Ghaemmaghami
- Medals Ranked 8th: Gold 4 Silver 4 Bronze 9 Total 17

Asian Indoor Games appearances
- 2005; 2007; 2009; 2013; 2017; 2021; 2026

Iran participated in the 2007 Asian Indoor Games held in Macau, China from October 26, 2007 to November 3, 2007.

== Competitors ==
| Sport | Men | Women | Total |
|---|---|---|---|
| Aggressive inline skating | 4 | | 4 |
| Bowling | 4 | | 4 |
| Chess | 3 | 4 | 7 |
| Cue sports | 2 | | 2 |
| Esports | 3 | | 3 |
| Finswimming | 1 | | 1 |
| Futsal | 14 | 14 | 28 |
| Gymnastics aerobic | 3 | | 3 |
| Indoor athletics | 15 | 6 | 21 |
| Indoor hockey | 12 | | 12 |
| Kabaddi | 12 | | 12 |
| Muaythai | 5 | | 5 |
| Sepak takraw | 5 | | 5 |
| Short course swimming | 6 | | 6 |
| Skateboarding | 2 | | 2 |
| Sport climbing | 6 | 4 | 10 |
| Total | 97 | 28 | 125 |

== Medal summary ==
=== Medals by sport ===
| Sport | Gold | Silver | Bronze | Total |
|---|---|---|---|---|
| Chess | | 1 | 2 | 3 |
| Esports | | 1 | 2 | 3 |
| Futsal | 1 | | | 1 |
| Indoor athletics | | 1 | 3 | 4 |
| Indoor hockey | 1 | | | 1 |
| Kabaddi | | | 1 | 1 |
| Muaythai | 1 | 1 | 1 | 3 |
| Short course swimming | 1 | | | 1 |
| Total | 4 | 4 | 9 | 17 |

=== Medalists ===
| Medal | Name | Sport | Event |
|---|---|---|---|
| Gold | Mostafa Nazari; Mohammad Mehdi Katebi; Hassan Donyaei; Mostafa Tayyebi; Ali Kiaei; Majid Latifi; Ali Asghar Hassanzadeh; Mohammad Keshavarz; Masoud Daneshvar; Mohammad Taheri; Ahmad Mollaali; Hossein Mahdavinia; Sajjad Bandi; Ebrahim Masoudi | Futsal | Men |
| Gold | Majid Khalaji; Mehdi Malekahmadi; Yaghoub Bahrami; Morteza Ahmadi; Masoud Bohlouli; Ali Malekahmadi; Aref Mohammadi; Reza Abbasi; Reza Norouzzadeh; Reza Fattahi; Javad Shabani; Jafar Fareghi | Indoor hockey | Men |
| Gold | Mostafa Abdollahi | Muaythai | Men's 75 kg |
| Gold | Mohammad Alirezaei | Short course swimming | Men's 50 m breaststroke |
| Silver | Shadi Paridar | Chess | Women's individual rapid |
| Silver | Meisam Hosseini | Esports | Open FIFA |
| Silver | Ehsan Mohajer Shojaei | Indoor athletics | Men's 800 m |
| Silver | Vahid Roshani | Muaythai | Men's 71 kg |
| Bronze | Elshan Moradi | Chess | Men's individual blitz |
| Bronze | Ehsan Ghaemmaghami; Elshan Moradi; Homayoun Tofighi; Shadi Paridar; Shayesteh Ghaderpour; Mitra Hejazipour | Chess | Mixed team rapid |
| Bronze | Farzan Homaei | Esports | Open NBA Live |
| Bronze | Naeim Hedayati | Esports | Open Need for Speed |
| Bronze | Iman Roghani; Hashem Khazaei; Reza Bouazar; Sajjad Moradi | Indoor athletics | Men's 4 × 400 m relay |
| Bronze | Pendar Shoghian | Indoor athletics | Men's pole vault |
| Bronze | Mehdi Shahrokhi | Indoor athletics | Men's shot put |
| Bronze | Abdolhamid Maghsoudloo; Mohammad Bagher Mazandarani; Ramezan Ali Paeinmahalli; Farhad Kamal Gharibi; Kianoush Naderian; Moslem Amiri; Houman Seidi; Nasser Roumiani; Ali Doustmohammadi; Reza Kamali Moghaddam; Morteza Shahidi; Ebad Dalili | Kabaddi | Men |
| Bronze | Jalal Motamedi | Muaythai | Men's 67 kg |

== Results by event ==
=== Bowling ===
| Athlete | Event | Preliminary | | Knockout round | | | |
| Athlete | Event | Score | Rank | Quarterfinal | Semifinal | Final | Rank |
|---|---|---|---|---|---|---|---|
| Hossein Omidali | Men's singles | 1123 | 54 | Did not advance | | | |
| Ebrahim Oushani | Men's singles | 1052 | 69 | Did not advance | | | |
| Sam Salimi | Men's singles | 1066 | 66 | Did not advance | | | |
| Hamid Reza Seyed-Azizollah | Men's singles | 976 | 74 | Did not advance | | | |
| Hossein Omidali; Ebrahim Oushani | Men's doubles | 2331 | 22 | Did not advance | | | |
| Sam Salimi; Hamid Reza Seyed-Azizollah | Men's doubles | 2262 | 25 | Did not advance | | | |
| Ebrahim Oushani; Sam Salimi; Hamid Reza Seyed-Azizollah; Hossein Omidali | Men's team of 4 | 4591 | 16 | —N/a | Did not advance | | |

=== Chess ===
Individual blitz

| Athlete | Event | Swiss round | | | | | | | | | Semifinal | Final | Rank |
| Athlete | Event | Round 1 | Round 2 | Round 3 | Round 4 | Round 5 | Round 6 | Round 7 | Round 8 | Round 9 | Semifinal | Final | Rank |
|---|---|---|---|---|---|---|---|---|---|---|---|---|---|
| Elshan Moradi | Men | Yueh (TPE); W 1–0 | Kazhgaleyev (KAZ); W 1–0 | Bu (CHN); L 0–1 | Ali (IRQ); W 1–0 | Nguyễn (VIE); W 1–0 | Adianto (INA); D ½–½ | Sasikiran (IND); D ½–½ | Antonio (PHI); L 0–1 | Al-Modiahki (QAT); W 1–0 | Sasikiran (IND); L 1½–2½ | Did not advance | 3rd place, bronze medalist(s) |
| Atousa Pourkashian | Women | Lee (MAC); W 1–0 | Zulaikha (MAS); W 1–0 | Humpy (IND); L 0–1 | Zhao (CHN); W 1–0 | Zhu (QAT); L 0–1 | Mohammed (IRQ); L 0–1 | Al-Attar (JOR); W 1–0 | Hishii (JPN); W 1–0 | Sukandar (INA); L 0–1 | Did not advance | | 7 |

Individual rapid

| Athlete | Event | Team competition | | | | | | | | Semifinal | Final | Rank |
| Athlete | Event | Nepal | China | Indonesia | Mongolia | Vietnam | Kazakhstan | Tiebreaker | Rank | Semifinal | Final | Rank |
|---|---|---|---|---|---|---|---|---|---|---|---|---|
| Ehsan Ghaemmaghami | Men | Shrestha; W 1–0 | Bu; L 0–1 | Megaranto; W 1–0 | Gündavaa; D ½–½ | Lê; D ½–½ | Kazhgaleyev; D ½–½ | —N/a | 6 | Did not advance | | 11 |
| Elshan Moradi | Men | Shrestha; W 1–0 | Wang; L 0–1 | Juswanto; W 1–0 | Batchuluun; W 1–0 | Nguyễn; D ½–½ | Ismagambetov; W 1–0 | —N/a | 4 | Did not advance | | 7 |
| Shadi Paridar | Women | Bye; W WO | Zhao; W 1–0 | Sukandar; W 1–0 | Batzayaa; W 1–0 | Hoàng; W 1–0 | Dauletova; L 0–1 | Dauletova (KAZ); W 1–0 | 2 Q | Nguyễn (VIE); W 1–1 (1–0) | Dronavalli (IND); L ½–1½ | 2nd place, silver medalist(s) |
| Shayesteh Ghaderpour | Women | Bye; W WO | Ruan; D ½–½ | Lindiawati; L 0–1 | Otgonjargal; W 1–0 | Nguyễn; L 0–1 | Sergeyeva; W 1–0 | —N/a | 7 | Did not advance | | 14 |

Individual standard

| Athlete | Event | Team competition | | | | | | | Semifinal | Final | Rank |
| Athlete | Event | Japan | China | Jordan | Malaysia | Indonesia | Philippines | Rank | Semifinal | Final | Rank |
|---|---|---|---|---|---|---|---|---|---|---|---|
| Ehsan Ghaemmaghami | Men | Kojima; D ½–½ | Bu; D ½–½ | Samhouri; W 1–0 | Hafizulhelmi; D ½–½ | Adianto; D ½–½ | So; W 1–0 | 5 | Did not advance | | 10 |
| Elshan Moradi | Men | Nanjo; D ½–½ | Ni; L 0–1 | Al-Rimawi; W 1–0 | —N/a | Megaranto; L 0–1 | —N/a | — | Did not advance | | — |
| Shadi Paridar | Women | Ishizuka; W 1–0 | Xu; L 0–1 | Al-Attar; W 1–0 | Zulaikha; D ½–½ | Sukandar; L 0–1 | —N/a | — | Did not advance | | — |
| Shayesteh Ghaderpour | Women | Shibata; W 1–0 | Hou; L 0–1 | Emad; W 1–0 | Zullkafli; W 1–0 | Lumongdong; W 1–0 | Camacho; L 0–1 | 6 | Did not advance | | 11 |

Mixed team

| Athlete | Event | Swiss round | | | | | | | | | Rank |
| Athlete | Event | Round 1 | Round 2 | Round 3 | Round 4 | Round 5 | Round 6 | Round 7 | Round 8 | Round 9 | Rank |
|---|---|---|---|---|---|---|---|---|---|---|---|
| Ehsan Ghaemmaghami; Elshan Moradi; Homayoun Tofighi; Shadi Paridar; Shayesteh Ghaderpour; Mitra Hejazipour | Blitz | Pakistan; W 4–0 | India; L 1–3 | Indonesia; L 1–3 | Qatar; W 3–1 | Japan; W 3½–½ | China; L 1–3 | Iraq; W 4–0 | Kazakhstan; D 2–2 | Vietnam; L 1–3 | 9 |
| Ehsan Ghaemmaghami; Elshan Moradi; Homayoun Tofighi; Shadi Paridar; Shayesteh Ghaderpour; Mitra Hejazipour | Rapid | Nepal; W 4–0 | China; L 1½–2½ | Indonesia; W 3–1 | Mongolia; W 3½–½ | Vietnam; D 2–2 | Kazakhstan; W 2½–1½ | —N/a | | | 3rd place, bronze medalist(s) |
| Ehsan Ghaemmaghami; Elshan Moradi; Homayoun Tofighi; Shadi Paridar; Shayesteh Ghaderpour; Mitra Hejazipour | Standard | Japan; W 3–1 | China; L ½–3½ | Jordan; W 4–0 | Malaysia; W 3–1 | Indonesia; L 1½–2½ | Philippines; L 1½–2½ | —N/a | | | 9 |

=== Cue sports ===
| Athlete | Event | Round of 64 | Round of 32 | Round of 16 | Quarterfinal | Semifinal | Final | Rank |
|---|---|---|---|---|---|---|---|---|
| Shervin Rahimi | Men's nine-ball | Odetalah (JOR); L 8–11 | Did not advance | | | | | 33 |
| Farhad Shahverdi | Men's nine-ball | Zhang (CHN); L 1–11 | Did not advance | | | | | 33 |

=== Esports ===
| Athlete | Event | Round robin | | | | | | | Semifinal | Final | Rank |
| Athlete | Event | Round 1 | Round 2 | Round 3 | Round 4 | Round 5 | Round 6 | Rank | Semifinal | Final | Rank |
|---|---|---|---|---|---|---|---|---|---|---|---|
| Meisam Hosseini | FIFA | Lkhagvasüren (MGL); W 1–0 | Al-Rewaily (QAT); W 1–0 | Yang (CHN); W 1–0 | Tadjibaev (UZB); W 1–0 | Agarwal (IND); W 1–0 | Al-Mudhaf (KUW); W 1–0 | 1 Q | Tadjibaev (UZB); W 2–0 | Yang (CHN); L 0–2 | 2nd place, silver medalist(s) |
| Farzan Homaei | NBA Live | Bilgüün (MGL); L 0–1 | Al-Naqeeb (QAT); W 1–0 | Al-Raja (KUW); W 1–0 | Lei (CHN); L 0–1 | —N/a | | 3 Q | Lei (CHN); L 0–2 | 3rd place match Al-Naqeeb (QAT); W 2–0 | 3rd place, bronze medalist(s) |
| Naeim Hedayati | Need for Speed | Ganzorig (MGL); W 1–0 | Shamuzafarov (UZB); W WO | Mohammed (QAT); W 1–0 | Al-Qaoud (KUW); W 1–0 | Tomar (IND); W 1–0 | Liu (CHN); L 0–1 | 2 Q | Shamuzafarov (UZB); L 0–2 | 3rd place match Al-Qaoud (KUW); W 2–0 | 3rd place, bronze medalist(s) |

=== Extreme sports ===
==== Aggressive inline ====
| Athlete | Event | Preliminary | | Final | |
| Athlete | Event | Score | Rank | Score | Rank |
|---|---|---|---|---|---|
| Arash Salmanpour | Open big air | —N/a | | NM | 11 |
| Masoud Vahedi | Open big air | —N/a | | 3.20 m | 8 |
| Ali Bandari | Open park | 50.16 | 9 Q | 40.00 | 10 |
| Ardeshir Ghovanloupour | Open park | 47.00 | 11 | Did not advance | |
| Ali Bandari | Open park best trick | —N/a | | 50 | 4 |
| Ardeshir Ghovanloupour | Open park best trick | —N/a | | 50 | 4 |
| Arash Salmanpour | Open vert | 47.66 | 8 Q | 48.00 | 8 |
| Masoud Vahedi | Open vert | 44.33 | 9 Q | 47.00 | 9 |

==== Skateboarding ====
| Athlete | Event | Preliminary | | Final | |
| Athlete | Event | Score | Rank | Score | Rank |
|---|---|---|---|---|---|
| Mohammad Javad Rahimi | Open park | 46.33 | 15 | Did not advance | |
| Sasan Sadeghpour | Open park | 54.00 | 13 | Did not advance | |
| Mohammad Javad Rahimi | Open park best trick | —N/a | | 50 | 4 |
| Sasan Sadeghpour | Open park best trick | —N/a | | 50 | 4 |

==== Sport climbing ====
| Athlete | Event | Qualification | | Round of 16 | Quarterfinal | Semifinal | | Final | Rank |
| Athlete | Event | Result / Time | Rank | Round of 16 | Quarterfinal | Result | Rank | Result | Rank |
|---|---|---|---|---|---|---|---|---|---|
| Gholam Ali Baratzadeh | Men's lead | 36 | 6 Q | —N/a | | 27− | 11 | Did not advance | 11 |
| Mohammad Jafari | Men's lead | 35 | 8 Q | —N/a | | 31− | 6 Q | 33 | 5 |
| Sobhan Jafari | Men's lead | 36 | 6 Q | —N/a | | 22 | 20 | Did not advance | 20 |
| Mehdi Namrvari | Men's speed | 41.29 | 12 Q | Asmoro (INA); W 38.33–Fall | Lai (HKG); L 36.42–28.85 | Did not advance | | | 7 |
| Reza Pilpa | Men's speed | 37.30 | 9 Q | Devyaterikov (KAZ); L Fall–26.67 | Did not advance | | | | 14 |
| Hamid Reza Touzandeh | Men's speed | 42.09 | 14 Q | Nigmatulin (KAZ); L Fall–26.63 | Did not advance | | | | 15 |
| Bahareh Moradi | Women's lead | 28 | 14 Q | —N/a | | 26+ | 18 | Did not advance | 18 |
| Elnaz Rekabi | Women's lead | 30− | 12 Q | —N/a | | 32+ | 12 | Did not advance | 12 |
| Farnaz Esmaeilzadeh | Women's speed | 155.04 | 13 | —N/a | Did not advance | | | | 13 |
| Azam Karami | Women's speed | Fall | 14 | —N/a | Did not advance | | | | 14 |

=== Finswimming ===
| Athlete | Event | Heats | | Final | |
| Athlete | Event | Time | Rank | Time | Rank |
|---|---|---|---|---|---|
| Soheil Maleka Ashtiani | Men's 50 m surface | 20.60 | 18 | Did not advance | |

=== Futsal ===
| Team | Event | Preliminary round | | | | | Quarterfinal | Semifinal | Final | Rank |
| Team | Event | Round 1 | Round 2 | Round 3 | Round 4 | Rank | Quarterfinal | Semifinal | Final | Rank |
|---|---|---|---|---|---|---|---|---|---|---|
| Iran | Men | Indonesia; W 7–0 | Saudi Arabia; W 15–1 | Kyrgyzstan; W 9–1 | Lebanon; W 10–2 | 1 Q | Tajikistan; W 18–3 | China; W 7–1 | Thailand; W 7–4 | 1st place, gold medalist(s) |
| Iran | Women | Malaysia; W 13–1 | Japan; L 6–7 | Thailand; L 2–8 | —N/a | 3 | —N/a | 5th–7th places Malaysia; W 17–2 | 5th–7th places Philippines; W 18–2 | 5 |
Roster – Men: Mostafa Nazari; Mohammad Mehdi Katebi; Hassan Donyaei; Mostafa Tayyebi; Ali Kiaei; Majid Latifi; Ali Asghar Hassanzadeh; Mohammad Keshavarz; Masoud Daneshvar; Mohammad Taheri; Ahmad Mollaali; Hossein Mahdavinia; Sajjad Bandi; Ebrahim Masoudi; Coach: (Brazil) Jurandir Dutra Roster – Women: Farzaneh Tavassoli; Arezoo Sadaghianizadeh; Azizeh Karimipour; Ziba Babaei; Zivar Babaei; Zohreh Meisami; Elnaz Armat; Maryam Hosseini; Leila Eghbali; Masoumeh Rezazadeh; Fahimeh Zareei; Mahnaz Sadeghi; Maryam Rouhani; Behnaz Khayyat; Coach: (Spain) Cristina Avellán

=== Gymnastics aerobic ===
| Athlete | Event | Qualification | | Final | |
| Athlete | Event | Score | Rank | Score | Rank |
|---|---|---|---|---|---|
| Alireza Farrokh | Men's Individual | 16.08 | 13 | Did not advance | |
| Hamed Namazi | Men's Individual | 16.15 | 12 | Did not advance | |
| Saed Ebadi; Alireza Farrokh; Hamed Namazi | Open trio | 14.95 | 9 Q | 15.80 | 8 |

=== Indoor athletics ===
Track

| Athlete | Event | Round 1 | | Semifinal | | Final | Rank |
| Athlete | Event | Time | Rank | Time | Rank | Time | Rank |
|---|---|---|---|---|---|---|---|
| Iman Roghani | Men's 60 m | 6.84 | 3 Q | 6.88 | 4 | Did not advance | 9 |
| Mohammad Akefian | Men's 400 m | 49.17 | 3 q | 48.58 | 3 q | 49.06 | 6 |
| Reza Bouazar | Men's 400 m | 49.23 | 1 Q | 48.15 | 2 Q | 48.22 | 4 |
| Ehsan Mohajer Shojaei | Men's 800 m | 1:52.18 | 2 Q | —N/a | | 1:50.22 | 2nd place, silver medalist(s) |
| Sajjad Moradi | Men's 800 m | DNF | — | —N/a | | Did not advance | — |
| Rouhollah Mohammadi | Men's 1500 m | 4:00.31 | 2 Q | —N/a | | 3:52.94 | 4 |
| Sajjad Moradi | Men's 1500 m | DNF | — | —N/a | | Did not advance | — |
| Omid Mehrabi | Men's 3000 m | —N/a | | | | 8:19.48 | 6 |
| Rouhollah Mohammadi | Men's 3000 m | —N/a | | | | DNS | — |
| Iman Roghani; Hashem Khazaei; Reza Bouazar; Sajjad Moradi | Men's 4 × 400 m relay | 3:18.54 | 3 q | —N/a | | 3:13.18 | 3rd place, bronze medalist(s) |
| Zohreh Farjam | Women's 400 m | 56.77 | 4 q | —N/a | | 57.10 | 6 |
| Maryam Tousi | Women's 400 m | 55.37 | 2 Q | —N/a | | 55.13 | 5 |
| Mina Pourseifi | Women's 800 m | 2:11.38 | 2 Q | —N/a | | 2:12.58 | 5 |
| Leila Ebrahimi | Women's 1500 m | —N/a | | | | DNF | — |
| Leila Ebrahimi | Women's 3000 m | —N/a | | | | DNS | — |
| Sepideh Tavakkoli | Women's 60 m hurdles | —N/a | | | | 9.32 | 6 |
| Zohreh Farjam; Maryam Tousi; Zahra Nabizadeh; Mina Pourseifi | Women's 4 × 400 m relay | —N/a | | | | 3:58.11 | 5 |

Field

| Athlete | Event | Qualification | | Final | |
| Athlete | Event | Result | Rank | Result | Rank |
|---|---|---|---|---|---|
| Amin Hosseinzadeh Rahbar | Men's high jump | 2.04 | 10 q | 2.04 | 12 |
| Mohsen Rabbani | Men's pole vault | —N/a | | No mark | — |
| Pendar Shoghian | Men's pole vault | —N/a | | 4.90 | 3rd place, bronze medalist(s) |
| Mohammad Arzandeh | Men's long jump | —N/a | | 7.39 | 5 |
| Afshin Daghari Hemadi | Men's triple jump | —N/a | | 15.63 | 6 |
| Mehdi Shahrokhi | Men's shot put | —N/a | | 18.48 | 3rd place, bronze medalist(s) |
| Zahra Nabizadeh | Women's high jump | —N/a | | 1.80 | 5 |
| Sepideh Tavakkoli | Women's high jump | —N/a | | 1.70 | 7 |

Combined

| Athlete | Event | 60m | LJ | SP | HJ | 60mH | PV | 1000m | Total | Rank |
|---|---|---|---|---|---|---|---|---|---|---|
| Hadi Sepehrzad | Men's heptathlon | DNS | — | — | — | — | — | — | DNS | — |

=== Indoor hockey ===
| Team | Event | Round robin | | | | | | Final | Rank |
| Team | Event | Round 1 | Round 2 | Round 3 | Round 4 | Round 5 | Rank | Final | Rank |
|---|---|---|---|---|---|---|---|---|---|
| Iran | Men | India; W 2–1 | Hong Kong; W 8–2 | South Korea; W 5–3 | Malaysia; D 3–3 | Macau; W 10–0 | 1 Q | South Korea; W 7–0 | 1st place, gold medalist(s) |
Roster: Majid Khalaji; Mehdi Malekahmadi; Yaghoub Bahrami; Morteza Ahmadi; Masoud Bohlouli; Ali Malekahmadi; Aref Mohammadi; Reza Abbasi; Reza Norouzzadeh; Reza Fattahi; Javad Shabani; Jafar Fareghi; Coach: (Germany) Michael Schmitz

=== Kabaddi ===
| Team | Event | Round robin | | | | | | | Final | Rank |
| Team | Event | Round 1 | Round 2 | Round 3 | Round 4 | Round 5 | Round 6 | Rank | Final | Rank |
|---|---|---|---|---|---|---|---|---|---|---|
| Iran | Men | Sri Lanka; W 55–9 | Pakistan; L 12–27 | Bangladesh; W 35–16 | Japan; W 31–19 | Malaysia; W 106–16 | India; L 10–27 | 3 | Did not advance | 3rd place, bronze medalist(s) |
Roster: Abdolhamid Maghsoudloo; Mohammad Bagher Mazandarani; Ramezan Ali Paeinmahalli; Farhad Kamal Gharibi; Kianoush Naderian; Moslem Amiri; Houman Seidi; Nasser Roumiani; Ali Doustmohammadi; Reza Kamali Moghaddam; Morteza Shahidi; Ebad Dalili; Coach: (India) Manjit Singh

=== Muaythai ===
| Athlete | Event | Round of 16 | Quarterfinal | Semifinal | Final | Rank |
|---|---|---|---|---|---|---|
| Ali Ekranpour | Men's 63.5 kg | Khetnok (THA); L 0–5 | Did not advance | | | 9 |
| Jalal Motamedi | Men's 67 kg | Bye | Ng (MAC); W 5–0 | Kahhorov (UZB); L 0–5 | Did not advance | 3rd place, bronze medalist(s) |
| Vahid Roshani | Men's 71 kg | —N/a | Jawad (IRQ); W 5–0 | Shetty (IND); W RSCH | Kadirkulov (UZB); L 1–4 | 2nd place, silver medalist(s) |
| Mostafa Abdollahi | Men's 75 kg | —N/a | Chu (MAC); W KO | El-Kaissi (LIB); W RSCH | Shukla (IND); W RSCH | 1st place, gold medalist(s) |
| Yousef Soltani | Men's 81 kg | —N/a | Matsumoto (JPN); L 0–5 | Did not advance | | 5 |

=== Sepak takraw ===
| Athlete | Event | Round 1 | | Round 2 | | Semifinal | Final | Rank |
| Athlete | Event | Score | Rank | Score | Rank | Semifinal | Final | Rank |
|---|---|---|---|---|---|---|---|---|
| Majid Salmani; Eslam Gharehmoshk; Mohammad Rezaei; Salim Agh; Mohsen Padidar | Men's hoop | 370 | 6 Q | 480 | 6 | Did not advance | | 6 |

=== Short course swimming ===
| Athlete | Event | Heats | | Final | |
| Athlete | Event | Time | Rank | Time | Rank |
|---|---|---|---|---|---|
| Mohammad Bidarian | Men's 50 m freestyle | 23.44 | 7 Q | 23.42 | 6 |
| Hamid Reza Mobarrez | Men's 50 m freestyle | 23.43 | 6 Q | 23.51 | 8 |
| Mohammad Bidarian | Men's 100 m freestyle | 51.44 | 3 Q | 50.87 | 5 |
| Pasha Vahdati | Men's 100 m freestyle | 52.53 | 9 | Did not advance | |
| Emin Noshadi | Men's 200 m freestyle | 1:53.42 | 7 Q | 1:54.03 | 8 |
| Shahin Baradaran | Men's 50 m backstroke | 28.18 | 15 | Did not advance | |
| Shahin Baradaran | Men's 100 m backstroke | 59.70 | 13 | Did not advance | |
| Mohammad Alirezaei | Men's 50 m breaststroke | 28.70 | 2 Q | 28.35 | 1st place, gold medalist(s) |
| Mohammad Alirezaei | Men's 100 m breaststroke | 1:03.70 | 7 Q | 1:03.98 | 7 |
| Hamid Reza Mobarrez | Men's 50 m butterfly | 25.42 | 5 Q | 25.46 | 7 |
| Hamid Reza Mobarrez | Men's 100 m butterfly | 1:07.63 | 21 | Did not advance | |
| Shahin Baradaran | Men's 100 m individual medley | 59.83 | 14 | Did not advance | |
| Pasha Vahdati; Mohammad Bidarian; Hamid Reza Mobarrez; Emin Noshadi | Men's 4 × 50 m freestyle relay | 1:34.73 | 5 Q | 1:32.54 | 5 |
| Emin Noshadi; Hamid Reza Mobarrez; Pasha Vahdati; Mohammad Bidarian | Men's 4 × 100 m freestyle relay | 3:26.70 | 2 Q | 3:25.69 | 4 |
| Shahin Baradaran; Mohammad Alirezaei; Hamid Reza Mobarrez; Mohammad Bidarian; Emin Noshadi (heats) | Men's 4 × 50 m medley relay | 1:44.11 | 5 Q | 1:43.36 | 6 |
| Shahin Baradaran; Mohammad Alirezaei; Hamid Reza Mobarrez; Mohammad Bidarian; Emin Noshadi (heats) | Men's 4 × 100 m medley relay | 3:52.23 | 2 Q | 3:49.78 | 6 |

== Demonstration sports ==
=== 3x3 basketball ===
| Athlete | Event | Preliminary round | | | | Final | Rank |
| Athlete | Event | Round 1 | Round 2 | Round 3 | Rank | Final | Rank |
|---|---|---|---|---|---|---|---|
| Arsalan Kazemi; Farbod Farman; Mehdi Shirjang; Mohammad Amjad | Men | Chinese Taipei; W 21–13 | Philippines; W 21–12 | Malaysia; W 21–8 | 1 Q | China; W 33–28 | 1st place, gold medalist(s) |

=== Kurash ===
| Athlete | Event | Quarterfinal | Semifinal | Final | Rank |
|---|---|---|---|---|---|
| Ali Maloumat | Men's 73 kg | Chan (HKG); W | Azimi (AFG); W | Dustov (UZB); W | 1st place, gold medalist(s) |
| Saeid Khosravinejad | Men's +90 kg | Chen (TPE); W | Meyliev (UZB); W | Yoshioka (JPN); W | 1st place, gold medalist(s) |
| Toktam Bidel | Women's 63 kg | —N/a | Ng (HKG); W | Chi (TPE); W | 1st place, gold medalist(s) |
| Sahar Chaghalvand | Women's +78 kg | —N/a | | Lin (TPE); L | 2nd place, silver medalist(s) |
