= Chess at the 2007 Asian Indoor Games =

- Venue: Macau International Shooting Range
- Dates: 26 October – 3 November 2007

Chess at the 2007 Asian Indoor Games was held in Macau International Shooting Range, Macau, China from 26 October to 3 November 2007.

== Medalists ==
=== Blitz ===
Event	Gold	Silver	Bronze
Men's individual	Krishnan Sasikiran; India	Murtas Kazhgaleyev; Kazakhstan	Elshan Moradi; Iran
Men's individual	Krishnan Sasikiran; India	Murtas Kazhgaleyev; Kazakhstan	Bu Xiangzhi; China
Women's individual	Koneru Humpy; India	Zhu Chen; Qatar	Irene Kharisma Sukandar; Indonesia
Women's individual	Koneru Humpy; India	Zhu Chen; Qatar	Phạm Bích Ngọc; Vietnam
Mixed team	China; Ni Hua; Wang Hao; Zhang Pengxiang; Zhao Xue; Hou Yifan; Ruan Lufei	India; Krishnan Sasikiran; Surya Shekhar Ganguly; Subramanian Arun Prasad; Koneru Humpy; Tania Sachdev; Harika Dronavalli	Kazakhstan; Murtas Kazhgaleyev; Anuar Ismagambetov; Yevgeniy Vladimirov; Gulmira Dauletova; Aigerim Rysbayeva; Mariya Sergeyeva

=== Rapid ===
Event	Gold	Silver	Bronze
Men's individual	Krishnan Sasikiran; India	Mohammed Al-Modiahki; Qatar	Bu Xiangzhi; China
Men's individual	Krishnan Sasikiran; India	Mohammed Al-Modiahki; Qatar	Nguyễn Ngọc Trường Sơn; Vietnam
Women's individual	Harika Dronavalli; India	Shadi Paridar; Iran	Catherine Perena; Philippines
Women's individual	Harika Dronavalli; India	Shadi Paridar; Iran	Nguyễn Thị Thanh An; Vietnam
Mixed team	India; Krishnan Sasikiran; Surya Shekhar Ganguly; J. Deepan Chakkravarthy; Koneru Humpy; Harika Dronavalli; Tania Sachdev	Vietnam; Nguyễn Ngọc Trường Sơn; Lê Quang Liêm; Nguyễn Thị Thanh An; Hoàng Thị Bảo Trâm	Iran; Ehsan Ghaemmaghami; Elshan Moradi; Homayoun Tofighi; Shadi Paridar; Shayesteh Ghaderpour; Mitra Hejazipour

=== Standard ===
Event	Gold	Silver	Bronze
Men's individual	Ni Hua; China	Murtas Kazhgaleyev; Kazakhstan	Bayarsaikhany Gündavaa; Mongolia
Men's individual	Ni Hua; China	Murtas Kazhgaleyev; Kazakhstan	Mas Hafizulhelmi; Malaysia
Women's individual	Zhu Chen; Qatar	Hou Yifan; China	Harika Dronavalli; India
Women's individual	Zhu Chen; Qatar	Hou Yifan; China	Siti Zulaikha; Malaysia
Mixed team	China; Bu Xiangzhi; Ni Hua; Wang Hao; Xu Yuhua; Hou Yifan; Zhao Xue	India; Krishnan Sasikiran; Surya Shekhar Ganguly; J. Deepan Chakkravarthy; Koneru Humpy; Harika Dronavalli; Subbaraman Meenakshi	Vietnam; Nguyễn Anh Dũng; Lê Quang Liêm; Nguyễn Ngọc Trường Sơn; Nguyễn Thị Thanh An; Lê Kiều Thiên Kim; Hoàng Thị Bảo Trâm

== Medal table ==
Rank	Nation	Gold	Silver	Bronze	Total
1	India (IND)	5	2	1	8
2	China (CHN)	3	1	2	6
3	Qatar (QAT)	1	2	0	3
4	Kazakhstan (KAZ)	0	2	1	3
5	Vietnam (VIE)	0	1	4	5
6	Iran (IRI)	0	1	2	3
7	Malaysia (MAS)	0	0	2	2
8	Indonesia (INA)	0	0	1	1
8	Mongolia (MGL)	0	0	1	1
8	Philippines (PHI)	0	0	1	1
Totals (10 entries)		9	9	15	33

== Results ==
=== Blitz ===
==== Men's individual ====
2 November

===== Preliminary round =====
Rank	Athlete	R1	R2	R3	R4	R5	R6	R7	R8	R9	Pts
1	Krishnan Sasikiran (IND)	IRQ; 1	VIE; 0	BRN; 1	KAZ; 1	PHI ½	CHN ½	IRI ½	MGL; 1	INA; 1	6½
2	Murtas Kazhgaleyev (KAZ)	JOR; 1	IRI; 0	MAS; 1	IND; 0	JPN; 1	QAT; 1	CHN ½	INA; 1	PHI; 1	6½
3	Bu Xiangzhi (CHN)	MAS ½	PAK; 1	IRI; 1	PHI; 1	INA; 1	IND ½	KAZ ½	QAT ½	VIE; 0	6
4	Elshan Moradi (IRI)	TPE; 1	KAZ; 1	CHN; 0	IRQ; 1	VIE; 1	INA ½	IND ½	PHI; 0	QAT; 1	6
5	Nguyễn Ngọc Trường Sơn (VIE)	MAC; 1	IND; 1	INA; 0	MGL; 1	IRI; 0	MAS; 0	BRN; 1	SYR; 1	CHN; 1	6
6	Rogelio Antonio (PHI)	NEP; 1	PLE; 1	QAT ½	CHN; 0	IND ½	SYR; 1	INA ½	IRI; 1	KAZ; 0	5½
7	Ahmad Samhouri (JOR)	KAZ; 0	NEP; 1	SYR ½	SIN; 1	QAT; 0	JPN; 0	AFG; 1	MAC; 1	MGL; 1	5½
8	Wu Shaobin (SIN)	PAK ½	MAS; 0	JPN; 1	JOR; 0	MAC; 1	MGL; 0	NEP; 1	IRQ; 1	BRN; 1	5½
9	Tunveer Mohyuddin Gillani (PAK)	SIN ½	CHN; 0	NEP; 1	BRN; 0	MDV; 1	IRQ; 0	BYE; 1	MAS; 1	TPE; 1	5½
10	Utut Adianto (INA)	BRN; 1	SYR; 1	VIE; 1	QAT; 1	CHN; 0	IRI ½	PHI ½	KAZ; 0	IND; 0	5
11	Mohammed Al-Modiahki (QAT)	JPN; 1	MGL; 1	PHI ½	INA; 0	JOR; 1	KAZ; 0	IRQ; 1	CHN ½	IRI; 0	5
12	Imad Hakki (SYR)	MDV; 1	INA; 0	JOR ½	MAS ½	AFG; 1	PHI; 0	JPN; 1	VIE; 0	MAC; 1	5
13	Mas Hafizulhelmi (MAS)	CHN ½	SIN; 1	KAZ; 0	SYR ½	BRN; 1	VIE; 1	MGL; 0	PAK; 0	JPN ½	4½
14	Noah Ali (IRQ)	IND; 0	MAC; 1	AFG; 1	IRI; 0	MGL ½	PAK; 1	QAT; 0	SIN; 0	BYE; 1	4½
15	Tsegmediin Batchuluun (MGL)	AFG; 1	QAT; 0	PLE; 1	VIE; 0	IRQ ½	SIN; 1	MAS; 1	IND; 0	JOR; 0	4½
16	Ryosuke Nanjo (JPN)	QAT; 0	TPE; 1	SIN; 0	MDV; 1	KAZ; 0	JOR; 1	SYR; 0	BYE; 1	MAS ½	4½
17	Maher Ayyad (BRN)	INA; 0	MDV; 1	IND; 0	PAK; 1	MAS; 0	TPE; 1	VIE; 0	PLE; 1	SIN; 0	4
18	Keshav Shrestha (NEP)	PHI; 0	JOR; 0	PAK; 0	MAC; 1	BYE; 1	AFG; 0	SIN; 0	MDV; 1	PLE; 1	4
19	Hammidullah Haidary (AFG)	MGL; 0	BYE; 1	IRQ; 0	PLE; 1	SYR; 0	NEP; 1	JOR; 0	TPE; 0	MDV; 1	4
20	Yueh Wei-po (TPE)	IRI; 0	JPN; 0	MAC; 0	BYE; 1	PLE; 1	BRN; 0	MDV; 1	AFG; 1	PAK; 0	4
21	Ho Cheng Fai (MAC)	VIE; 0	IRQ; 0	TPE; 1	NEP; 0	SIN; 0	BYE; 1	PLE; 1	JOR; 0	SYR; 0	3
22	Abdul Rahman Zeidan (PLE)	BYE; 1	PHI; 0	MGL; 0	AFG; 0	TPE; 0	MDV; 1	MAC; 0	BRN; 0	NEP; 0	2
23	Ahmed Naeem (MDV)	SYR; 0	BRN; 0	BYE; 1	JPN; 0	PAK; 0	PLE; 0	TPE; 0	NEP; 0	AFG; 0	1

===== Knockout round =====
Semifinals		Final
Krishnan Sasikiran (IND)	2½
Elshan Moradi (IRI)	1½	Krishnan Sasikiran (IND)	3
Murtas Kazhgaleyev (KAZ)	3	Murtas Kazhgaleyev (KAZ)	0
Bu Xiangzhi (CHN)	0

==== Women's individual ====
2 November

===== Preliminary round =====
Rank	Athlete	R1	R2	R3	R4	R5	R6	R7	R8	R9	Pts
1	Zhu Chen (QAT)	PHI; 1	INA; 1	CHN ½	IND ½	IRI; 1	MAS ½	VIE; 1	IRQ; 1	MGL; 1	7½
2	Koneru Humpy (IND)	MGL; 1	KAZ; 1	IRI; 1	QAT ½	VIE; 1	CHN ½	IRQ; 1	INA; 1	MAS ½	7½
3	Phạm Bích Ngọc (VIE)	CHN; 0	JOR; 1	INA; 1	MAS; 1	IND; 0	PHI; 1	QAT; 0	BYE; 1	BRN; 1	6
4	Irene Kharisma Sukandar (INA)	IRQ; 1	QAT; 0	VIE; 0	JOR; 1	MGL; 1	KAZ; 1	CHN; 1	IND; 0	IRI; 1	6
5	Zhao Xue (CHN)	VIE; 1	BRN; 1	QAT ½	IRI; 0	PHI; 1	IND ½	INA; 0	KAZ; 1	JOR; 1	6
6	Siti Zulaikha (MAS)	JPN; 1	IRI; 0	BRN; 1	VIE; 0	KAZ; 1	QAT ½	MGL; 1	PHI; 1	IND ½	6
7	Atousa Pourkashian (IRI)	MAC; 1	MAS; 1	IND; 0	CHN; 1	QAT; 0	IRQ; 0	JOR; 1	JPN; 1	INA; 0	5
8	Sherily Cua (PHI)	QAT; 0	IRQ; 1	KAZ; 1	MGL; 1	CHN; 0	VIE; 0	MAC; 1	MAS; 0	BYE; 1	5
9	Dhuha Mohammed (IRQ)	INA; 0	PHI; 0	MAC; 1	BRN; 1	BYE; 1	IRI; 1	IND; 0	QAT; 0	JPN; 1	5
10	Gulmira Dauletova (KAZ)	JOR; 1	IND; 0	PHI; 0	JPN; 1	MAS; 0	INA; 0	BYE; 1	CHN; 0	MAC; 1	4
11	Sengeravdangiin Otgonjargal (MGL)	IND; 0	MAC; 1	JPN; 1	PHI; 0	INA; 0	BYE; 1	MAS; 0	BRN; 1	QAT; 0	4
12	Ghayda Al-Attar (JOR)	KAZ; 0	VIE; 0	BYE; 1	INA; 0	BRN; 1	JPN; 1	IRI; 0	MAC; 1	CHN; 0	4
13	Ayano Hishii (JPN)	MAS; 0	BYE; 1	MGL; 0	KAZ; 0	MAC; 1	JOR; 0	BRN; 1	IRI; 0	IRQ; 0	3
14	Aysha Mutaywea (BRN)	BYE; 1	CHN; 0	MAS; 0	IRQ; 0	JOR; 0	MAC; 1	JPN; 0	MGL; 0	VIE; 0	2
15	Lee Wing Yan (MAC)	IRI; 0	MGL; 0	IRQ; 0	BYE; 1	JPN; 0	BRN; 0	PHI; 0	JOR; 0	KAZ; 0	1

===== Knockout round =====
Semifinals		Final
Zhu Chen (QAT)	3
Irene Kharisma Sukandar (INA)	0	Zhu Chen (QAT)	2 (0)
Koneru Humpy (IND)	3	Koneru Humpy (IND)	2 (1)
Phạm Bích Ngọc (VIE)	0

==== Mixed team ====
3 November

Rank	Team	R1	R2	R3	R4	R5	R6	R7	R8	R9	MP	GP
1st place, gold medalist(s)	China (CHN)	JOR; 4–0	PHI; 3–1	KAZ; 2½–1½	IND; 1½–2½	VIE; 3½–½	IRI; 3–1	MAS; 3–1	INA; 3–1	MGL; 3½–½	16	27
2nd place, silver medalist(s)	India (IND)	IRQ; 4–0	IRI; 3–1	VIE; 2½–1½	CHN; 2½–1½	MGL; 3½–½	KAZ; 1½–2½	QAT; 2½–1½	PHI; 2–2	MAS; 1–3	13	22½
3rd place, bronze medalist(s)	Kazakhstan (KAZ)	JPN; 4–0	QAT; 2½–1½	CHN; 1½–2½	INA; 2–2	MAS; 4–0	IND; 2½–1½	VIE; 2–2	IRI; 2–2	PHI; 2–2	12	22½
4	Vietnam (VIE)	SIN; 4–0	MGL; 4–0	IND; 1½–2½	PHI; 2½–1½	CHN ½–3½	INA; 2–2	KAZ; 2–2	QAT; 3–1	IRI; 3–1	12	22½
5	Malaysia (MAS)	AFG; 4–0	INA; 2½–1½	QAT; 2–2	MGL; 1–3	KAZ; 0–4	JOR; 4–0	CHN; 1–3	JPN; 3–1	IND; 3–1	11	20½
6	Philippines (PHI)	MAC; 4–0	CHN; 1–3	IRQ; 4–0	VIE; 1½–2½	INA; 3–1	QAT; 1–3	JPN; 2½–1½	IND; 2–2	KAZ; 2–2	10	21
7	Indonesia (INA)	SYR; 4–0	MAS; 1½–2½	IRI; 3–1	KAZ; 2–2	PHI; 1–3	VIE; 2–2	MGL; 3–1	CHN; 1–3	IRQ; 3–1	10	20½
8	Qatar (QAT)	BRN; 4–0	KAZ; 1½–2½	MAS; 2–2	IRI; 1–3	JOR; 3½–½	PHI; 3–1	IND; 1½–2½	VIE; 1–3	TPE; 4–0	9	21½
9	Iran (IRI)	PAK; 4–0	IND; 1–3	INA; 1–3	QAT; 3–1	JPN; 3½–½	CHN; 1–3	IRQ; 4–0	KAZ; 2–2	VIE; 1–3	9	20½
10	Jordan (JOR)	CHN; 0–4	MAC; 3½–½	MGL; 0–4	SIN; 4–0	QAT ½–3½	MAS; 0–4	BRN; 4–0	TPE; 2–2	MDV; 4–0	9	18
11	Japan (JPN)	KAZ; 0–4	BRN; 3–1	SIN; 2–2	IRQ; 3–1	IRI ½–3½	SYR; 3–1	PHI; 1½–2½	MAS; 1–3	BYE; 2	9	16
12	Macau (MAC)	PHI; 0–4	JOR ½–3½	BRN; 3–1	SYR; 2–2	IRQ; 0–4	AFG; 3–1	SIN; 2–2	BYE; 2	PAK; 2–2	9	14½
13	Mongolia (MGL)	TPE; 4–0	VIE; 0–4	JOR; 4–0	MAS; 3–1	IND ½–3½	IRQ; 1–3	INA; 1–3	BRN; 3–1	CHN ½–3½	8	17
14	Iraq (IRQ)	IND; 0–4	MDV; 4–0	PHI; 0–4	JPN; 1–3	MAC; 4–0	MGL; 3–1	IRI; 0–4	PAK; 3½–½	INA; 1–3	8	16½
15	Bahrain (BRN)	QAT; 0–4	JPN; 1–3	MAC; 1–3	BYE; 2	MDV; 3½–½	PAK; 3–1	JOR; 0–4	MGL; 1–3	AFG; 4–0	8	15½
16	Singapore (SIN)	VIE; 0–4	TPE; 2–1	JPN; 2–2	JOR; 0–4	BYE; 1	MDV; 2–0	MAC; 2–2	AFG; 2–0	SYR; 2–0	7	13
17	Syria (SYR)	INA; 0–4	AFG; 2–0	PAK; 1–1	MAC; 2–2	TPE; 2–1	JPN; 1–3	BYE; 1	MDV; 2–0	SIN; 0–2	5	11
18	Pakistan (PAK)	IRI; 0–4	BYE; 1	SYR; 1–1	TPE; 2–1	AFG; 1–1	BRN; 1–3	MDV; 2–0	IRQ ½–3½	MAC; 2–2	4	10½
19	Chinese Taipei (TPE)	MGL; 0–4	SIN; 1–2	MDV; 2–1	PAK; 1–2	SYR; 1–2	BYE; 1	AFG; 1–2	JOR; 2–2	QAT; 0–4	3	9
20	Afghanistan (AFG)	MAS; 0–4	SYR; 0–2	BYE; 1	MDV; 2–0	PAK; 1–1	MAC; 1–3	TPE; 2–1	SIN; 0–2	BRN; 0–4	3	7
21	Maldives (MDV)	BYE; 1	IRQ; 0–4	TPE; 1–2	AFG; 0–2	BRN ½–3½	SIN; 0–2	PAK; 0–2	SYR; 0–2	JOR; 0–4	1	2½

- Two match points were awarded to a team to score at least 2½ points in a match and one match point was awarded to a team to score 2 points in a match.

=== Rapid ===
==== Men's individual ====
===== Team competition =====
26–27 October

Rank	Athlete	R1	R2	R3	R4	R5	R6	Pts
Board 1
1	Bu Xiangzhi (CHN)	0	1	1	1	1	1	5
2	Krishnan Sasikiran (IND)	1	1	1	0	1	1	5
3	Bayarsaikhany Gündavaa (MGL)	1	1	1	½	1	½	5
4	Susanto Megaranto (INA)	1	1	0	1	1	0	4
5	Wong Meng Kong (SIN)	1	1	1	0	1	0	4
6	Ehsan Ghaemmaghami (IRI)	1	0	1	½	½	½	3½
7	Lê Quang Liêm (VIE)	1	1	0	1	½	0	3½
8	Mohammed Al-Sayed (QAT)	1	0	1	0	0	1	3
—	Bilam Lal Shrestha (NEP)	0		1	0	1	1	3
9	Noah Ali (IRQ)	0	1	0	1	1	0	3
10	Mas Hafizulhelmi (MAS)	1	0	0	1	0	½	2½
11	Tunveer Mohyuddin Gillani (PAK)	0	0	1	0	1	½	2½
—	Wesley So (PHI)				1	1	½	2½
—	Shinya Kojima (JPN)	0	1		0		1	2
12	Ibrahim Abdulla (MDV)	0	1	0	0	0	1	2
13	Murtas Kazhgaleyev (KAZ)	1	0	0	0	0	½	1½
14	Maher Ayyad (BRN)	0	0	0	1	0	0	1
—	Ahmad Samhouri (JOR)	0	0		1	0		1
—	João Carlos Bartilotti (MAC)	0	0			0	0	0
Board 2
1	Nguyễn Ngọc Trường Sơn (VIE)	1	1	1	1	½	1	5½
2	Mohammed Al-Modiahki (QAT)	1	0	1	1	1	1	5
3	Wu Shaobin (SIN)	0	1	1	1	1	1	5
4	Elshan Moradi (IRI)	1	0	1	1	½	1	4½
5	Mahmood Lodhi (PAK)	0	1	1	½	1	1	4½
6	Surya Shekhar Ganguly (IND)	1	1	0	1	0	½	3½
7	Tsegmediin Batchuluun (MGL)	1	½	1	0	1	0	3½
—	Rolando Nolte (PHI)	1	0	1	½	1		3½
8	Wang Hao (CHN)	1	1	1	0	0	0	3
9	Anuar Ismagambetov (KAZ)	½	½	0	½	1	0	2½
10	Bahjat Al-Rimawi (JOR)	0	1	0	½	0	1	2½
11	Ahmed Fuad (MDV)	½	0	0	1	0	1	2½
—	Keshav Shrestha (NEP)	0		1	0	1	0	2
—	Danny Juswanto (INA)	1	1	0	0			2
—	Yudai Iwasaki (JPN)	0		1	0	0	1	2
12	Anas Nazreen Bakri (MAS)	½	0	0	1	0	0	1½
—	Ahmed Aziz (IRQ)	½	1	0	0			1½
13	Husain Ayyad (BRN)	0	0	0	1	0	0	1
—	Yueh Wei-po (TPE)	0		0	0	0	0	0
—	Rodolfo Abelgas (MAC)	0	0	0	0			0

===== Knockout round =====
27 October

Semifinals		Final
Bu Xiangzhi (CHN)	1 (0)
Mohammed Al-Modiahki (QAT)	1 (1)	Mohammed Al-Modiahki (QAT)	½
Nguyễn Ngọc Trường Sơn (VIE)	1 (0)	Krishnan Sasikiran (IND)	1½
Krishnan Sasikiran (IND)	1 (1)

==== Women's individual ====
===== Team competition =====
26–27 October

Rank	Athlete	R1	R2	R3	R4	R5	R6	Pts
Board 1
1	Catherine Perena (PHI)	1	1	1	0	1	1	5
2	Shadi Paridar (IRI)	1	1	1	1	1	0	5
3	Gulmira Dauletova (KAZ)	1	1	1	1	0	1	5
4	Koneru Humpy (IND)	1	0	1	½	1	1	4½
5	Hoàng Thị Bảo Trâm (VIE)	1	1	0	1	0	1	4
6	Zhu Chen (QAT)	1	0	1	1	0	1	4
7	Lee Wing Yan (MAC)	0	1	1	1	1	0	4
8	Siti Zulaikha (MAS)	1	0	0	1	1	1	4
9	Irene Kharisma Sukandar (INA)	1	1	0	0	1	0	3
10	Ghayda Al-Attar (JOR)	0	1	0	1	0	1	3
11	Aysha Mutaywea (BRN)	0	0	1	1	1	0	3
12	Yanjivyn Batzayaa (MGL)	1	0	1	0	0	0	2
13	Mirai Ishizuka (JPN)	0	1	0	0	0	1	2
—	Jannar Worya (IRQ)	0	1	0	1	0		2
—	Zhao Xue (CHN)	1	0	0				1
Board 2
1	Nguyễn Thị Thanh An (VIE)	1	1	½	1	1	1	5½
2	Harika Dronavalli (IND)	1	1	½	1	½	1	5
3	Evi Lindiawati (INA)	1	½	1	1	1	0	4½
4	Mariya Sergeyeva (KAZ)	1	1	½	1	½	0	4
5	Dhuha Mohammed (IRQ)	0	1	1	1	0	1	4
6	Annie Jane Salvador (MAC)	0	1	0	1	1	1	4
—	Chen I-chen (TPE)	0		1	1	1	1	4
7	Shayesteh Ghaderpour (IRI)	1	½	0	1	0	1	3½
8	Sengeravdangiin Otgonjargal (MGL)	1	0	1	0	1	½	3½
9	Sherily Cua (PHI)	1	0	1	0	1	½	3½
10	Nur Shazwani Zullkafli (MAS)	1	½	0	1	0	1	3½
11	Ruan Lufei (CHN)	1	½	½	0	1	0	3
12	Misaki Shibata (JPN)	0	1	1	0	0	0	2
13	Tania Emad (JOR)	0	1	0	1	0	0	2
14	Abeer Rajab (BRN)	0	0	1	0	1	0	2
—	Safar Al-Shaymaa (QAT)		0	0	0	0	1	1

- Shadi Paridar of Iran tied with Gulmira Dauletova on score and Buchholz on board 1 but defeated the latter in the play-off.

===== Knockout round =====
27 October

Semifinals		Final
Catherine Perena (PHI)	½
Harika Dronavalli (IND)	1½	Harika Dronavalli (IND)	1½
Nguyễn Thị Thanh An (VIE)	1 (0)	Shadi Paridar (IRI)	½
Shadi Paridar (IRI)	1 (1)

==== Mixed team ====
26–27 October

Rank	Team	R1	R2	R3	R4	R5	R6	MP	GP
1st place, gold medalist(s)	India (IND)	PAK; 4–0	PHI; 3–1	VIE; 2½–1½	CHN; 2½–1½	KAZ; 2½–1½	INA; 3½–½	12	18
2nd place, silver medalist(s)	Vietnam (VIE)	JOR; 4–0	QAT; 4–0	IND; 1½–2½	JPN; 4–0	IRI; 2–2	CHN; 3–1	9	18½
3rd place, bronze medalist(s)	Iran (IRI)	NEP; 4–0	CHN; 1½–2½	INA; 3–1	MGL; 3½–½	VIE; 2–2	KAZ; 2½–1½	9	16½
4	Philippines (PHI)	BRN; 4–0	IND; 1–3	MAS; 4–0	KAZ; 1½–2½	JPN; 4–0	MGL; 3–1	8	17½
5	China (CHN)	SIN; 3–1	IRI; 2½–1½	KAZ; 2½–1½	IND; 1½–2½	QAT; 3–1	VIE; 1–3	8	13½
6	Indonesia (INA)	JPN; 4–0	MAS; 3½–½	IRI; 1–3	QAT; 2–2	JOR; 4–0	IND ½–3½	7	15
7	Qatar (QAT)	MAC; 4–0	VIE; 0–4	IRQ; 3–1	INA; 2–2	CHN; 1–3	BRN; 4–0	7	14
8	Mongolia (MGL)	TPE; 4–0	KAZ; 1½–2½	JOR; 4–0	IRI ½–3½	MAS; 3–1	PHI; 1–3	6	14
9	Kazakhstan (KAZ)	IRQ; 3½–½	MGL; 2½–1½	CHN; 1½–2½	PHI; 2½–1½	IND; 1½–2½	IRI; 1½–2½	6	13
10	Malaysia (MAS)	MDV; 3½–½	INA ½–3½	PHI; 0–4	NEP; 4–0	MGL; 1–3	PAK; 2½–1½	6	11½
11	Jordan (JOR)	VIE; 0–4	MDV; 3–1	MGL; 0–4	PAK; 3½–½	INA; 0–4	MAC; 3–1	6	9½
12	Japan (JPN)	INA; 0–4	PAK; 3–1	MAC; 3–1	VIE; 0–4	PHI; 0–4	IRQ; 3–1	6	9
13	Iraq (IRQ)	KAZ ½–3½	BRN; 4–0	QAT; 1–3	SIN; 3–1	MAC; 2–2	JPN; 1–3	5	11½
14	Macau (MAC)	QAT; 0–4	SIN; 2–2	JPN; 1–3	MDV; 3–1	IRQ; 2–2	JOR; 1–3	4	9
15	Bahrain (BRN)	PHI; 0–4	IRQ; 0–4	PAK; 2–2	TPE; 3–1	SIN; 2–2	QAT; 0–4	4	7
16	Singapore (SIN)	CHN; 1–3	MAC; 2–2	TPE; 2–1	IRQ; 1–3	BRN; 2–2	NEP; 1–1	3	9
17	Pakistan (PAK)	IND; 0–4	JPN; 1–3	BRN; 2–2	JOR ½–3½	MDV; 2–0	MAS; 1½–2½	2	7
18	Nepal (NEP)	IRI; 0–4	DNS; 0	MDV; 2–0	MAS; 0–4	TPE; 2–1	SIN; 1–1	2	5
19	Chinese Taipei (TPE)	MGL; 0–4	BYE; 2	SIN; 1–2	BRN; 1–3	NEP; 1–2	MDV; 1–2	1	6
20	Maldives (MDV)	MAS ½–3½	JOR; 1–3	NEP; 0–2	MAC; 1–3	PAK; 0–2	TPE; 2–1	1	4½

- Two match points were awarded to a team to score at least 2½ points in a match and one match point was awarded to a team to score 2 points in a match.

=== Standard ===
==== Men's individual ====
===== Team competition =====
28–30 October

Rank	Athlete	R1	R2	R3	R4	R5	R6	Pts
Board 1
1	Murtas Kazhgaleyev (KAZ)	1	1	½	½	½	1	4½
2	Mas Hafizulhelmi (MAS)	1	0	1	½	1	1	4½
3	Bu Xiangzhi (CHN)	1	½	½	1	½	½	4
4	Tsegmediin Batchuluun (MGL)	1	½	1	½	0	1	4
5	Ehsan Ghaemmaghami (IRI)	½	½	1	½	½	1	4
6	Mahmood Lodhi (PAK)	0	1	½	1	½	1	4
7	Nguyễn Anh Dũng (VIE)	1	0	1	½	½	½	3½
8	Utut Adianto (INA)	1	½	½	½	½	½	3½
9	Krishnan Sasikiran (IND)	1	½	½	0	1	½	3½
10	Hammidullah Haidary (AFG)	0	½	1	0	1	1	3½
11	Wesley So (PHI)	1	½	½	½	½	0	3
12	Mohammed Al-Modiahki (QAT)	1	1	½	½	0	0	3
13	Wong Meng Kong (SIN)	0	0	½	1	1	½	3
14	Keshav Shrestha (NEP)	0	½	1	½	0	1	3
—	Shinya Kojima (JPN)	½	1		0	½		2
—	Noah Ali (IRQ)	0	1	0	1			2
15	Maher Ayyad (BRN)	0	1	0	0	½	0	1½
16	Ahmed Fuad (MDV)	½	0	0	1	0	0	1½
—	Ahmad Samhouri (JOR)	0		0	1		0	1
—	João Carlos Bartilotti (MAC)	0	0		0		0	0
Board 2
1	Ni Hua (CHN)	1	1	1	1	1	½	5½
2	Bayarsaikhany Gündavaa (MGL)	1	0	1	1	½	1	4½
3	Wu Shaobin (SIN)	0	1	1	1	1	½	4½
4	Lê Quang Liêm (VIE)	1	0	1	1	0	1	4
5	Susanto Megaranto (INA)	1	1	0	½	1	½	4
6	Surya Shekhar Ganguly (IND)	½	1	1	0	1	0	3½
7	Lim Yee Weng (MAS)	1	1	0	0	½	1	3½
8	Tahah Anit (AFG)	0	½	1	1	1	0	3½
9	Mohammed Al-Sayed (QAT)	1	1	½	½	0	0	3
—	Rodolfo Abelgas (MAC)	0		1	0	1	1	3
10	Anuar Ismagambetov (KAZ)	1	0	0	0	½	1	2½
11	Bilam Lal Shrestha (NEP)	0	1	0	½	0	1	2½
—	Ronald Bancod (PHI)	1	0	½	0		1	2½
12	Amir Karim (PAK)	0	1	0	0	½	1	2½
—	Ryosuke Nanjo (JPN)	½		1	1		0	2½
—	Hussein Ali (IRQ)			0	1	1	0	2
13	Husain Ayyad (BRN)	0	1	0	0	0	1	2
14	Yueh Wei-po (TPE)	0	0	½	1	0	0	1½
—	Elshan Moradi (IRI)	½	0	1		0		1½
—	Bahjat Al-Rimawi (JOR)		0	0		1	0	1
15	Ibrahim Abdulla (MDV)	½	0	0	0	0	0	½

===== Knockout round =====
Semifinals; 31 October		Final; 1 November
Murtas Kazhgaleyev (KAZ)	1½
Bayarsaikhany Gündavaa (MGL)	½	Murtas Kazhgaleyev (KAZ)	½
Ni Hua (CHN)	2	Ni Hua (CHN)	1½
Mas Hafizulhelmi (MAS)	0

==== Women's individual ====
===== Team competition =====
Rank	Athlete	R1	R2	R3	R4	R5	R6	Pts
Board 1
1	Zhu Chen (QAT)	1	1	1	½	1	½	5
2	Siti Zulaikha (MAS)	1	½	1	½	1	1	5
3	Koneru Humpy (IND)	1	1	1	1	0	½	4½
4	Nguyễn Thị Thanh An (VIE)	1	0	1	1	1	½	4½
5	Irene Kharisma Sukandar (INA)	1	1	0	½	1	½	4
6	Xu Yuhua (CHN)	1	1	1	0	0	½	3½
—	Mariya Sergeyeva (KAZ)	1	½		0	1	1	3½
—	Mirai Ishizuka (JPN)	0	1		1	½	1	3½
7	Jannar Worya (IRQ)	0	1	0	1	1	0	3
8	Lee Wing Yan (MAC)	0	1	1	0	1	0	3
—	Shadi Paridar (IRI)	1	0	1	½	0		2½
9	Sengeravdangiin Otgonjargal (MGL)	1	0	1	0	0	½	2½
10	Ghayda Al-Attar (JOR)	0	1	0	1	½	0	2½
11	Aysha Mutaywea (BRN)	0	0	0	1	0	1	2
—	Catherine Perena (PHI)	1	0	0		0	½	1½
Board 2
1	Hou Yifan (CHN)	1	1	1	1	½	1	5½
2	Harika Dronavalli (IND)	1	1	1	0	1	1	5
3	Lê Kiều Thiên Kim (VIE)	1	1	1	1	½	0	4½
4	Chen I-chen (TPE)	0	1	½	1	1	1	4½
5	Gulmira Dauletova (KAZ)	1	1	0	0	1	1	4
6	Shayesteh Ghaderpour (IRI)	1	0	1	1	1	0	4
7	Yanjivyn Batzayaa (MGL)	1	0	1	0	1	1	4
8	Lisa Karlina Lumongdong (INA)	1	1	0	1	0	0	3
9	Nur Shazwani Zullkafli (MAS)	1	0	1	0	0	1	3
10	Dhuha Mohammed (IRQ)	0	1	0	1	1	0	3
—	Sheerie Lomibao (PHI)	1	0	1	1	0		3
11	Tania Emad (JOR)	0	1	0	1	1	0	3
12	Abeer Rajab (BRN)	0	1	0	1	0	1	3
—	Annie Jane Salvador (MAC)					1	1	2
13	Safar Al-Shaymaa (QAT)	1	0	0	0	0	0	1
—	Ayano Hishii (JPN)		1	0			0	1

===== Knockout round =====
Semifinals; 31 October		Final; 1 November
Zhu Chen (QAT)	1½
Harika Dronavalli (IND)	½	Zhu Chen (QAT)	1½
Hou Yifan (CHN)	2	Hou Yifan (CHN)	½
Siti Zulaikha (MAS)	0

==== Mixed team ====
28–30 October

Rank	Team	R1	R2	R3	R4	R5	R6	MP	GP
1st place, gold medalist(s)	China (CHN)	IRQ; 4–0	IRI; 3½–½	KAZ; 3½–½	IND; 3–1	VIE; 2–2	INA; 2½–1½	11	18½
2nd place, silver medalist(s)	India (IND)	JOR; 3½–½	PHI; 3½–½	INA; 3½–½	CHN; 1–3	QAT; 3–1	VIE; 2–2	9	16½
3rd place, bronze medalist(s)	Vietnam (VIE)	SIN; 4–0	QAT; 1–3	IRQ; 4–0	KAZ; 3½–½	CHN; 2–2	IND; 2–2	8	16½
4	Malaysia (MAS)	TPE; 4–0	KAZ; 1½–2½	JPN; 3–1	IRI; 1–3	MGL; 2½–1½	IRQ; 4–0	8	16
5	Kazakhstan (KAZ)	PAK; 4–0	MAS; 2½–1½	CHN ½–3½	VIE ½–3½	PHI; 3–1	JOR; 4–0	8	14½
6	Indonesia (INA)	MAC; 4–0	MGL; 3½–½	IND ½–3½	QAT; 2½–1½	IRI; 2½–1½	CHN; 1½–2½	8	14½
7	Philippines (PHI)	NEP; 4–0	IND ½–3½	QAT; 2–2	MGL; 2½–1½	KAZ; 1–3	IRI; 2½–1½	7	12½
8	Mongolia (MGL)	AFG; 4–0	INA ½–3½	BRN; 4–0	PHI; 1½–2½	MAS; 1½–2½	QAT; 3½–½	6	15
9	Iran (IRI)	JPN; 3–1	CHN ½–3½	JOR; 4–0	MAS; 3–1	INA; 1½–2½	PHI; 1½–2½	6	13½
10	Iraq (IRQ)	CHN; 0–4	MDV; 4–0	VIE; 0–4	MAC; 4–0	BRN; 3½–½	MAS; 0–4	6	11½
11	Jordan (JOR)	IND ½–3½	NEP; 2½–1½	IRI; 0–4	AFG; 3–1	JPN; 3–1	KAZ; 0–4	6	9
12	Qatar (QAT)	BRN; 4–0	VIE; 3–1	PHI; 2–2	INA; 1½–2½	IND; 1–3	MGL ½–3½	5	12
13	Japan (JPN)	IRI; 1–3	SIN; 3–1	MAS; 1–3	PAK; 3–1	JOR; 1–3	MAC; 2–2	5	11
14	Macau (MAC)	INA; 0–4	BRN; 1–3	NEP; 3–1	IRQ; 0–4	MDV; 4–0	JPN; 2–2	5	10
15	Bahrain (BRN)	QAT; 0–4	MAC; 3–1	MGL; 0–4	SIN; 2–2	IRQ ½–3½	AFG; 3–1	5	8½
16	Singapore (SIN)	VIE; 0–4	JPN; 1–3	PAK; 1½–½	BRN; 2–2	NEP; 2–0	BYE; 1	3	7½
17	Afghanistan (AFG)	MGL; 0–4	BYE; 1	MDV; 2–0	JOR; 1–3	TPE; 2–1	BRN; 1–3	3	7
18	Pakistan (PAK)	KAZ; 0–4	TPE; 2–1	SIN ½–1½	JPN; 1–3	BYE; 1	MDV; 2–0	3	6½
19	Chinese Taipei (TPE)	MAS; 0–4	PAK; 1–2	BYE; 1	MDV; 2–1	AFG; 1–2	NEP; 1–2	2	6
20	Nepal (NEP)	PHI; 0–4	JOR; 1½–2½	MAC; 1–3	BYE; 1	SIN; 0–2	TPE; 2–1	2	5½
21	Maldives (MDV)	BYE; 1	IRQ; 0–4	AFG; 0–2	TPE; 1–2	MAC; 0–4	PAK; 0–2	1	2

- Two match points were awarded to a team to score at least 2½ points in a match and one match point was awarded to a team to score 2 points in a match.
