= Sport climbing at the 2007 Asian Indoor Games =

- Venue: MUST Pavilion
- Dates: 30 October – 2 November 2007

Sport climbing at the 2007 Asian Indoor Games was held in MUST Pavilion, Macau, China from 30 October to 2 November 2007.

== Medalists ==
=== Men ===
Event	Gold	Silver	Bronze
Lead	Son Sang-won; South Korea	Sachi Anma; Japan	Kim Ja-ha; South Korea
Speed	Zhong Qixin; China	Alexandr Nigmatulin; Kazakhstan	Ye Xiangyang; China

=== Women ===
Event	Gold	Silver	Bronze
Lead	Kim Ja-in; South Korea	Akiyo Noguchi; Japan	Huang Liping; China
Speed	Li Chunhua; China	He Cuilian; China	Dinara Irsaliyeva; Kazakhstan

== Medal table ==
Rank	Nation	Gold	Silver	Bronze	Total
1	China (CHN)	2	1	2	5
2	South Korea (KOR)	2	0	1	3
3	Japan (JPN)	0	2	0	2
4	Kazakhstan (KAZ)	0	1	1	2
Totals (4 entries)		4	4	4	12

== Results ==
=== Men ===
==== Lead ====
31 October – 2 November

Rank	Athlete	Prel.	SF	Final
1st place, gold medalist(s)	Son Sang-won (KOR)	Top	Top	Top
2nd place, silver medalist(s)	Sachi Anma (JPN)	Top	Top	Top
3rd place, bronze medalist(s)	Kim Ja-ha (KOR)	Top	Top	44−
4	Kim Ja-bee (KOR)	Top	43−	41
5	Mohammad Jafari (IRI)	35	31−	33
6	Liu Changzhong (CHN)	Top	42−	28+
7	Zul Fadzli Shafiee (MAS)	33	29	28+
8	Lai Chi Wai (HKG)	32−	31−	28
9	Nurmansyah Putra (INA)	31	29	
10	Ye Xiangyang (CHN)	21	27	
11	Gholam Ali Baratzadeh (IRI)	36	27−	
12	Artyom Devyaterikov (KAZ)	29	27−	
13	Chu Ka Wai (HKG)	33	25+	
14	Praveen Chandramma (IND)	33−	24	
15	Amri (INA)	31−	24	
16	Prashant Allay (IND)	28+	24	
17	Hafzanizam Bakhori (MAS)	28	24	
18	Chang Yeu-shiang (TPE)	29+	23	
19	Chang Chih-wei (TPE)	26−	23−	
20	Sobhan Jafari (IRI)	36	22	
21	Foo Xiu Quan (SIN)	29	22	
22	Cao Rongwu (CHN)	28	22	
23	Arman Salada (PHI)	26−	22	
24	Ho Sin Fai (HKG)	22	19−	
25	Riki Kiswani (INA)	26+	14−	
26	Mohd Redha Rozlan (MAS)	28	12	
27	Phairat Kaewkan (THA)	19		
28	Dhansarit Meeseat (THA)	16+		
29	Nikita Devyaterikov (KAZ)	16−		
30	Jose Mari Cortes (PHI)	15		
31	Tömöriin Och (MGL)	12		
32	Fong Lei Ou (MAC)	12−		
33	Dangaasürengiin Ankhbold (MGL)	7		

==== Speed ====
30 October

===== Qualification =====
Rank	Athlete	Time
1	Zhong Qixin (CHN)	20.22
2	Ye Xiangyang (CHN)	23.48
3	Alexandr Nigmatulin (KAZ)	27.17
4	Lai Chi Wai (HKG)	28.66
5	Galar Pandu Asmoro (INA)	29.82
6	Sultoni Sulaiman (INA)	30.50
7	Hafzanizam Bakhori (MAS)	31.85
8	Nikita Devyaterikov (KAZ)	33.59
9	Reza Pilpa (IRI)	37.30
10	Praveen Chandramma (IND)	38.96
11	Ridzuan Yusoff (SIN)	40.60
12	Mehdi Namrvari (IRI)	41.29
13	Chang Chih-wei (TPE)	41.81
14	Hamid Reza Touzandeh (IRI)	42.09
15	Zaki Ramli (SIN)	42.81
16	Tömöriin Och (MGL)	52.08
17	Matwar Singh (IND)	Fall
17	Mohd Redha Rozlan (MAS)	Fall
17	Dangaasürengiin Ankhbold (MGL)	Fall
17	Hadinugroho Susanto (INA)	Fall
17	Ho Sin Fai (HKG)	Fall
17	Chang Yeu-shiang (TPE)	Fall
17	Artyom Devyaterikov (KAZ)	Fall

===== Knockout round =====
Eightfinals
Zhong Qixin (CHN)	27.59
Tömöriin Och (MGL)	Fall
Nikita Devyaterikov (KAZ)	26.67
Reza Pilpa (IRI)	Fall
Lai Chi Wai (HKG)	25.94
Chang Chih-wei (TPE)	39.02
Galar Pandu Asmoro (INA)	Fall
Mehdi Namrvari (IRI)	38.33
Ye Xiangyang (CHN)	22.47
Zaki Ramli (SIN)	29.41
Hafzanizam Bakhori (MAS)	Fall
Praveen Chandramma (IND)	36.90
Alexandr Nigmatulin (KAZ)	26.63
Hamid Reza Touzandeh (IRI)	Fall
Sultoni Sulaiman (INA)	Fall
Ridzuan Yusoff (SIN)	36.68

Quarterfinals
Zhong Qixin (CHN)	21.00
Nikita Devyaterikov (KAZ)	24.04
Lai Chi Wai (HKG)	28.85
Mehdi Namrvari (IRI)	36.42
Ye Xiangyang (CHN)	28.25
Praveen Chandramma (IND)	Fall
Alexandr Nigmatulin (KAZ)	23.89
Ridzuan Yusoff (SIN)	32.70

Semifinals
Zhong Qixin (CHN)	19.91
Lai Chi Wai (HKG)	Fall
Ye Xiangyang (CHN)	Fall
Alexandr Nigmatulin (KAZ)	34.86

Final
Zhong Qixin (CHN)	18.03
Alexandr Nigmatulin (KAZ)	23.63
Bronze
Lai Chi Wai (HKG)	22.37
Ye Xiangyang (CHN)	22.14

=== Women ===
==== Lead ====
31 October – 2 November

Rank	Athlete	Prel.	SF	Final
1st place, gold medalist(s)	Kim Ja-in (KOR)	Top	Top	Top
2nd place, silver medalist(s)	Akiyo Noguchi (JPN)	Top	46+	Top
3rd place, bronze medalist(s)	Huang Liping (CHN)	Top	45+	49
4	Rie Kimura (JPN)	Top	45	43−
5	Shin Woon-seon (KOR)	Top	43−	41
6	Liu Hiu Ying (HKG)	Top	42−	40−
7	Ilmawaty Labanu (INA)	34−	40	32
8	Li Chunhua (CHN)	41+	39−	25+
9	Tamara Smirnova (KAZ)	33−	36	
10	Wilda Baco Achmad (INA)	29	36−	
11	Zhang Dan (CHN)	38−	35+	
12	Elnaz Rekabi (IRI)	30−	32+	
13	Dinara Irsaliyeva (KAZ)	28	30−	
14	Shanti Rani Devi (IND)	24	29+	
15	Erna Cahyanti (INA)	28	29	
16	Choi Shun Yuk (HKG)	31−	28+	
17	Mallegowda Ninge Gowda (IND)	24	28+	
18	Bahareh Moradi (IRI)	28	26+	
19	Aliya Iskakova (KAZ)	27	26+	
20	Nur Zaharatullaili Mustafa (MAS)	24	26	
21	Cheang Un I (MAC)	15+	17	
22	Maria Camille Venturina (PHI)	12−	16	
23	Kimberly Singson (PHI)	11		
24	Erdenesürengiin Nergüi (MGL)	8		

==== Speed ====
30 October

===== Qualification =====
Rank	Athlete	Time
1	He Cuilian (CHN)	29.92
2	Li Chunhua (CHN)	31.62
3	He Cuifang (CHN)	31.79
4	Tamara Smirnova (KAZ)	39.20
5	Dinara Irsaliyeva (KAZ)	40.75
6	Evi Neliwati (INA)	42.66
7	Isoh (INA)	58.99
8	Gustiana Musdalipah (INA)	64.41
9	Mallegowda Ninge Gowda (IND)	79.60
10	Dasini Devi Khumanthem (IND)	85.30
11	Felicia Lim (SIN)	121.24
12	Puntarika Tunyavanich (THA)	137.31
13	Farnaz Esmaeilzadeh (IRI)	155.04
14	Sarah-Jean Toh (SIN)	Fall
14	Erdenesürengiin Nergüi (MGL)	Fall
14	Preeyaporn Chaiyasit (THA)	Fall
14	Pornnapa Supinnawong (THA)	Fall
14	Azam Karami (IRI)	Fall
14	Aliya Iskakova (KAZ)	Fall

===== Knockout round =====
Quarterfinals
He Cuilian (CHN)	31.85
Gustiana Musdalipah (INA)	Fall
Tamara Smirnova (KAZ)	35.97
Dinara Irsaliyeva (KAZ)	34.82
Li Chunhua (CHN)	34.37
Isoh (INA)	41.39
He Cuilian (CHN)	28.40
Evi Neliwati (INA)	40.70

Semifinals
He Cuilian (CHN)	38.93
Dinara Irsaliyeva (KAZ)	Fall
Li Chunhua (CHN)	26.10
He Cuilian (CHN)	26.53

Final
He Cuilian (CHN)	Fall
Li Chunhua (CHN)	26.56
Bronze
Dinara Irsaliyeva (KAZ)	35.85
He Cuilian (CHN)	30.96

- Dinara Irsaliyeva was awarded bronze because of no three-medal sweep per country rule.
