= Aerobic gymnastics at the 2007 Asian Indoor Games =

- Venue: Workers Sports Pavilion
- Dates: 26–28 October 2007

Aerobic gymnastics at the 2007 Asian Indoor Games was held in Workers Sports Pavilion, Macau, China from 26 October to 28 October 2007.

== Medalists ==
Event	Gold	Silver	Bronze
Men's individual	Ao Jinping; China	Song Jong-kun; South Korea	Phairach Thotkhamchai; Thailand
Women's individual	Huang Jinxuan; China	Roypim Ngampeerapong; Thailand	Nguyễn Phương Thanh; Vietnam
Mixed pair	China; He Shijian; Huang Jinxuan	South Korea; Cho Won-ho; Shim Mi-hyun	Thailand; Nattawut Pimpa; Suwadee Phrutichai
Trio	China; Qin Yong; Yu Wei; Zhang Peng	Thailand; Kittipong Tawinun; Phairach Thotkhamchai; Chanchalak Yiammit	South Korea; Cho Won-ho; Hwang In-chan; Song Jong-kun

== Medal table ==
Rank	Nation	Gold	Silver	Bronze	Total
1	China (CHN)	4	0	0	4
2	Thailand (THA)	0	2	2	4
3	South Korea (KOR)	0	2	1	3
4	Vietnam (VIE)	0	0	1	1
Totals (4 entries)		4	4	4	12

== Results ==
=== Men's individual ===
27–28 October

Rank	Athlete	Qual.	Final
1st place, gold medalist(s)	Ao Jinping (CHN)	21.78	21.85
2nd place, silver medalist(s)	Song Jong-kun (KOR)	18.75	21.15
3rd place, bronze medalist(s)	Phairach Thotkhamchai (THA)	19.80	20.60
4	Nguyễn Tiến Phương (VIE)	17.90	20.00
5	Dan Mar Luna (PHI)	17.30	17.70
6	Sum Sporn (CAM)	16.90	17.70
7	Laxman Prasad Sharma (IND)	16.65	17.50
8	Windra Lesmana (INA)	17.55	16.95
9	Zhou Xiaofeng (CHN)	20.85	
10	Kittipong Tawinun (THA)	19.35	
11	Liwliua Peralta (PHI)	16.30	
12	Hamed Namazi (IRI)	16.15	
13	Alireza Farrokh (IRI)	16.08	
14	Shyamsundar Joshi Ameya (IND)	16.00	
15	Enkhsaikhany Mönkh-Orgil (MGL)	15.60	
16	Veas Sarith (CAM)	15.60	
17	Liu Yi-chun (TPE)	14.90	

=== Women's individual ===
26–28 October

Rank	Athlete	Qual.	Final
1st place, gold medalist(s)	Huang Jinxuan (CHN)	21.00	20.85
2nd place, silver medalist(s)	Roypim Ngampeerapong (THA)	19.60	20.00
3rd place, bronze medalist(s)	Nguyễn Phương Thanh (VIE)	18.85	18.95
4	Jung Eun-ji (KOR)	17.83	18.20
5	Citra Resita (INA)	16.15	16.95
6	Christina Ferrer (PHI)	15.55	15.40
7	Wang Ting-yuan (TPE)	13.70	15.05
8	Manpreet Kour (IND)	14.35	14.45
9	Huang Li (CHN)	17.03	
10	Tri Handayani (INA)	15.23	

=== Mixed pair ===
26–28 October

Rank	Team	Qual.	Final
1st place, gold medalist(s)	China (CHN); He Shijian; Huang Jinxuan	20.20	20.65
2nd place, silver medalist(s)	South Korea (KOR); Cho Won-ho; Shim Mi-hyun	18.95	19.75
3rd place, bronze medalist(s)	Thailand (THA); Nattawut Pimpa; Suwadee Phrutichai	18.85	19.45
4	Vietnam (VIE); Vũ Bá Đông; Trần Thị Thu Hà	19.10	19.25
5	Indonesia (INA); Sugianto; Yuanita Mailussia	17.10	17.40
6	Philippines (PHI); Alejandro Mendelebar; Christina Ferrer	14.45	16.10
7	India (IND); Manvinder Singh; Manpreet Kour	14.15	14.10
8	China (CHN); Ni Zhenhua; Xu Jing	19.40	

=== Trio ===
27–28 October

Rank	Team	Qual.	Final
1st place, gold medalist(s)	China (CHN); Qin Yong; Yu Wei; Zhang Peng	20.40	21.35
2nd place, silver medalist(s)	Thailand (THA); Kittipong Tawinun; Phairach Thotkhamchai; Chanchalak Yiammit	20.20	20.45
3rd place, bronze medalist(s)	South Korea (KOR); Cho Won-ho; Hwang In-chan; Song Jong-kun	19.10	20.25
4	Vietnam (VIE); Nguyễn Tiến Phương; Nguyễn Xuân Giang; Vũ Bá Đông	18.00	19.35
5	Indonesia (INA); Ihsan Muhammad; Abdul Rahman; Sugianto	18.30	18.50
6	Philippines (PHI); Lester Go; Dico Ili; Alejandro Mendelebar	15.40	16.30
7	India (IND); Raja Parmar; Laxman Prasad Sharma; Satyajit Singh Sansam	16.25	15.90
8	Iran (IRI); Saed Ebadi; Alireza Farrokh; Hamed Namazi	14.95	15.80
9	Indonesia (INA); Arif Mufid; Rijal Umami; Eko Wibby Julianto	17.50	
