= Esports at the 2007 Asian Indoor Games =

- Venue: Macau East Asian Games Dome
- Dates: 27–30 October 2007

Esports at the 2007 Asian Indoor Games was held in Macau East Asian Games Dome, Macau, China from 27 October to 30 October 2007. Three events FIFA 07, NBA Live 07 and Need for Speed: Most Wanted were held in the competition.

== Medalists ==
Event	Gold	Silver	Bronze
FIFA 07	Yang Shuchao; China	Meisam Hosseini; Iran	Byambasürengiin Lkhagvasüren; Mongolia
NBA Live 07	Lei Chen; China	Chimedregzengiin Bilgüün; Mongolia	Farzan Homaei; Iran
Need for Speed: Most Wanted	Liu Xinting; China	Doniyor Shamuzafarov; Uzbekistan	Naeim Hedayati; Iran

== Medal table ==
Rank	Nation	Gold	Silver	Bronze	Total
1	China (CHN)	3	0	0	3
2	Iran (IRI)	0	1	2	3
3	Mongolia (MGL)	0	1	1	2
4	Uzbekistan (UZB)	0	1	0	1
Totals (4 entries)		3	3	3	9

== Results ==
=== FIFA 07 ===
==== Preliminary ====
27–29 October

Pos	Athlete	Pld	W	D	L	Pts	IRI	CHN	UZB	MGL	QAT	KUW	IND
1	Meisam Hosseini (IRI)	6	6	0	0	18	—	4–2	2–1	5–1	9–0	6–0	12–0
2	Yang Shuchao (CHN)	6	4	1	1	13	2–4	—	4–4	4–0	6–0	6–0	6–0
3	Bobur Tadjibaev (UZB)	6	3	1	2	10	1–2	4–4	—	6–4	11–1	4–2	
4	Byambasürengiin Lkhagvasüren (MGL)	6	2	1	3	7	1–5	0–4	4–6	—	7–2	3–3	8–0
5	Abdulaziz Al-Rewaily (QAT)	6	2	0	4	6	0–9	0–6	1–11	2–7	—	3–0	6–0
6	Zaid Al-Mudhaf (KUW)	6	1	1	4	4	0–6	0–6	2–4	3–3	0–3	—	7–1
7	Sarvesh Agarwal (IND)	6	1	0	5	3	0–12	0–6	WO	0–8	0–6	1–7	—

Source: Official website

==== Knockout round ====
Semifinals; 29 October
Meisam Hosseini (IRI)	2
Bobur Tadjibaev (UZB)	0
Yang Shuchao (CHN)	2
Byambasürengiin Lkhagvasüren (MGL)	0

Final; 30 October
Meisam Hosseini (IRI)	0
Yang Shuchao (CHN)	2
Additional (3)
Bobur Tadjibaev (UZB)	1
Byambasürengiin Lkhagvasüren (MGL)	2

=== NBA Live 07 ===
==== Preliminary ====
27–29 October

Pos	Athlete	Pld	W	L	Pts	CHN	MGL	IRI	QAT	KUW
1	Lei Chen (CHN)	4	4	0	12	—	109–87	84–71	79–38	83–56
2	Chimedregzengiin Bilgüün (MGL)	4	3	1	10	87–109	—	89–58	120–57	115–56
3	Farzan Homaei (IRI)	4	2	2	8	71–84	58–89	—	114–68	97–52
4	Nasser Al-Naqeeb (QAT)	4	1	3	6	38–79	57–120	68–114	—	98–62
5	Musaed Al-Raja (KUW)	4	0	4	4	56–83	56–115	52–97	62–98	—

Source: Official website

==== Knockout round ====
Semifinals; 29 October
Lei Chen (CHN)	2
Farzan Homaei (IRI)	0
Chimedregzengiin Bilgüün (MGL)	2
Nasser Al-Naqeeb (QAT)	0

Final; 30 October
Lei Chen (CHN)	2
Chimedregzengiin Bilgüün (MGL)	0
Additional (3)
Farzan Homaei (IRI)	2
Nasser Al-Naqeeb (QAT)	0

=== Need for Speed: Most Wanted ===
==== Preliminary ====
27–29 October

Pos	Athlete	Pld	W	L	Pts	CHN	IRI	KUW	UZB	MGL	QAT	IND
1	Liu Xinting (CHN)	6	6	0	18	—	6:21.11	7:34.19	5:55.08	6:23.33	8:19.38	7:44.57
2	Naeim Hedayati (IRI)	6	5	1	16	6:33.01	—	7:55.42	WO	6:20.96	6:31.51	6:17.91
3	Essa Al-Qaoud (KUW)	6	3	3	12	X	8:17.03	—	8:26.33	6:47.62	9:17.80	7:32.53
4	Doniyor Shamuzafarov (UZB)	6	3	3	10	6:02.35		8:00.73	—	7:40.26	6:21.36	
5	Batboldyn Ganzorig (MGL)	6	2	4	10	X	6:29.29	6:57.07	8:02.75	—	6:32.17	8:42.32
6	Ahmed Mohammed (QAT)	6	1	5	8	X	7:01.00	X	X	6:56.47	—	7:19.25
7	Kabir Tomar (IND)	6	1	5	8	X	X	X	WO	X	X	—

Source: Official website

==== Knockout round ====
Semifinals; 29 October
Liu Xinting (CHN)	2
Essa Al-Qaoud (KUW)	0
Naeim Hedayati (IRI)	0
Doniyor Shamuzafarov (UZB)	2

Final; 30 October
Liu Xinting (CHN)	2
Doniyor Shamuzafarov (UZB)	1
Additional (3)
Essa Al-Qaoud (KUW)	0
Naeim Hedayati (IRI)	2
