= Indoor athletics at the 2007 Asian Indoor Games =

- Venue: Macau East Asian Games Dome
- Dates: 30 October – 1 November 2007

Indoor athletics at the 2007 Asian Indoor Games was held in Macau East Asian Games Dome, Macau, China from 30 October to 1 November 2007.

== Medalists ==
=== Men ===
Event	Gold		Silver		Bronze	
60 m	Samuel Francis; Qatar	6.54; GR	Yahya Al-Ghahes; Saudi Arabia	6.56	Wachara Sondee; Thailand	6.65
400 m	Wang Liangyu; China	46.08; GR	Prasanna Amarasekara; Sri Lanka	47.09	Jukkatip Pojaroen; Thailand	47.40
800 m	Mohammad Al-Azemi; Kuwait	1:49.62; GR	Ehsan Mohajer Shojaei; Iran	1:50.22	Rajeev Ramesan; India	1:50.87
1500 m	Hamza Chatholi; India	3:50.22; GR	Omar Al-Rasheedi; Kuwait	3:50.58	Abubaker Ali Kamal; Qatar	3:50.78
3000 m	Charles Bett Koech; Qatar	8:04.69; GR	Surendra Singh; India	8:04.99	Sunil Kumar; India	8:10.07
60 m hurdles	Wu Youjia; China	7.82	Narongdech Janjai; Thailand	7.99	Muhammad Sajjad; Pakistan	8.02
4 × 400 m relay	Saudi Arabia; Hamdan Al-Bishi; Ali Al-Deraan; Yousef Masrahi; Hamed Al-Bishi	3:11.29; GR	Sri Lanka; Prasanna Amarasekara; Rohitha Pushpakumara; Shiwantha Weerasuriya; Ashoka Jayasundara	3:11.29; GR	Iran; Iman Roghani; Hashem Khazaei; Reza Bouazar; Sajjad Moradi	3:13.18
High jump	Rashid Al-Mannai; Qatar	2.24; GR	Sergey Zasimovich; Kazakhstan	2.21	Kim Young-min; South Korea	2.21
Pole vault	Liu Feiliang; China	5.30 =GR	Ali Al-Sabaghah; Kuwait	5.10	Pendar Shoghian; Iran	4.90
Long jump	Hussein Al-Sabee; Saudi Arabia	7.93; GR	Keeratikorn Janmanee; Thailand	7.59	Konstantin Safronov; Kazakhstan	7.51
Triple jump	Roman Valiyev; Kazakhstan	16.57; GR	Wu Bo; China	16.45	Yevgeniy Ektov; Kazakhstan	16.34
Shot put	Sultan Al-Hebshi; Saudi Arabia	18.99; GR	Ahmad Gholoum; Kuwait	18.88	Mehdi Shahrokhi; Iran	18.48
Heptathlon	P. J. Vinod; India	5561; GR	Pavel Dubitskiy; Kazakhstan	5432	Boonkete Chalon; Thailand	5046

=== Women ===
Event	Gold		Silver		Bronze	
60 m	Nongnuch Sanrat; Thailand	7.28; GR	Sangwan Jaksunin; Thailand	7.49	Natalya Ivoninskaya; Kazakhstan	7.59
400 m	Tang Xiaoyin; China	53.56	Tatyana Azarova; Kazakhstan	53.68	Olga Tereshkova; Kazakhstan	53.89
800 m	Liu Qing; China	2:06.13	Sinimole Paulose; India	2:06.32	Antony Vijila; India	2:06.75
1500 m	Sinimole Paulose; India	4:22.56	Svetlana Lukasheva; Kazakhstan	4:24.92	Li Zhenzhu; China	4:25.96
3000 m	Chen Xiaofang; China	9:23.11; GR	Preeja Sreedharan; India	9:27.62	Bùi Thị Hiền; Vietnam	9:36.38
60 m hurdles	Natalya Ivoninskaya; Kazakhstan	8.33; GR	Zhang Rong; China	8.35	Anastassiya Vinogradova; Kazakhstan	8.48
4 × 400 m relay	Kazakhstan; Tatyana Khajimuradova; Tatyana Azarova; Anna Gavriushenko; Olga Tereshkova	3:37.59 =GR	Thailand; Jutamass Tawoncharoen; Saowalee Kaewchuay; Kanya Harnthong; Wassana Winatho	3:38.25	India; Anu Maria Jose; Antony Vijila; Sini Jose; M. R. Poovamma	3:41.09
High jump	Noengrothai Chaipetch; Thailand	1.91; GR	Yekaterina Yevseyeva; Kazakhstan	1.88	Anna Ustinova; Kazakhstan	1.88
Pole vault	Ni Putu Desi Margawati; Indonesia	3.75	Sunisa Kaoiad; Thailand	3.60	Pasuta Wongwieng; Thailand	3.40
Long jump	Chen Yaling; China	6.45	Thitima Muangjan; Thailand	6.04	Sirada Seechaichana; Thailand	5.82
Triple jump	Irina Litvinenko; Kazakhstan	13.56	Thitima Muangjan; Thailand	13.42	Kang Hye-sun; North Korea	12.90
Shot put	Li Fengfeng; China	16.33	Juttaporn Krasaeyan; Thailand	15.69	Tin Ka Yin; Hong Kong	11.71
Pentathlon	Irina Naumenko; Kazakhstan	4179; GR	Liu Haili; China	4063	Watcharaporn Masim; Thailand	3614

== Medal table ==
Rank	Nation	Gold	Silver	Bronze	Total
1	China (CHN)	8	3	1	12
2	Kazakhstan (KAZ)	5	5	6	16
3	India (IND)	3	3	4	10
4	Saudi Arabia (KSA)	3	1	0	4
5	Qatar (QAT)	3	0	1	4
6	Thailand (THA)	2	8	6	16
7	Kuwait (KUW)	1	3	0	4
8	Indonesia (INA)	1	0	0	1
9	Sri Lanka (SRI)	0	2	0	2
10	Iran (IRI)	0	1	3	4
11	Hong Kong (HKG)	0	0	1	1
11	North Korea (PRK)	0	0	1	1
11	Pakistan (PAK)	0	0	1	1
11	South Korea (KOR)	0	0	1	1
11	Vietnam (VIE)	0	0	1	1
Totals (15 entries)		26	26	26	78

== Results ==
=== Men ===
==== 60 m ====
30 October

===== Round 1 =====
Rank	Athlete	Time
Heat 1
1	Wachara Sondee (THA)	6.79
2	Guo Fan (CHN)	6.79
3	Hoàng Thanh Việt (VIE)	6.95
4	Barakat Al-Harthi (OMA)	7.10
5	Jarah Al-Khadher (KUW)	7.15
6	Bayandorjiin Khosbayar (MGL)	7.47
—	Haykal Moussallem (LIB)	DSQ
Heat 2
1	Sompote Suwannarangsri (THA)	6.72
2	Umanga Surendra (SRI)	6.88
3	Tang Yik Chun (HKG)	6.88
4	Grigoriy Volodin (KAZ)	6.94
5	Eisa Al-Youhah (KUW)	7.02
6	Siraj Tamim (LIB)	7.04
Heat 3
1	Yahya Habeeb (KSA)	6.81
2	Muhammad Imran (PAK)	6.85
3	Chiang Wai Hung (HKG)	6.90
4	Shim Jung-bo (KOR)	6.98
5	Zahir Naseer (MDV)	7.44
—	Al-Waleed Abdulla (QAT)	DNS
Heat 4
1	Yahya Al-Ghahes (KSA)	6.61
2	Samuel Francis (QAT)	6.65
3	Iman Roghani (IRI)	6.84
4	Poh Seng Song (SIN)	6.91
5	Pao Hin Fong (MAC)	6.94
6	Lou Chi Wai (MAC)	7.30

===== Semifinals =====
Rank	Athlete	Time
Heat 1
1	Samuel Francis (QAT)	6.55
2	Yahya Al-Ghahes (KSA)	6.61
3	Wachara Sondee (THA)	6.68
4	Iman Roghani (IRI)	6.88
5	Umanga Surendra (SRI)	6.89
6	Chiang Wai Hung (HKG)	6.94
7	Poh Seng Song (SIN)	6.95
—	Shim Jung-bo (KOR)	DNS
Heat 2
1	Sompote Suwannarangsri (THA)	6.69
2	Guo Fan (CHN)	6.80
3	Tang Yik Chun (HKG)	6.84
4	Muhammad Imran (PAK)	6.85
5	Grigoriy Volodin (KAZ)	6.87
6	Hoàng Thanh Việt (VIE)	6.96
7	Pao Hin Fong (MAC)	7.01
—	Yahya Habeeb (KSA)	DSQ

===== Final =====
Rank	Athlete	Time
1st place, gold medalist(s)	Samuel Francis (QAT)	6.54
2nd place, silver medalist(s)	Yahya Al-Ghahes (KSA)	6.56
3rd place, bronze medalist(s)	Wachara Sondee (THA)	6.65
4	Guo Fan (CHN)	6.68
5	Muhammad Imran (PAK)	6.79
6	Tang Yik Chun (HKG)	6.86
7	Grigoriy Volodin (KAZ)	6.87
—	Sompote Suwannarangsri (THA)	DSQ

==== 400 m ====
===== Round 1 =====
30 October

Rank	Athlete	Time
Heat 1
1	Hamdan Al-Bishi (KSA)	48.74
2	Vinay Choudhary (IND)	48.96
3	Bibin Mathew (IND)	49.19
4	Fawzi Al-Shammari (KUW)	50.00
5	Idelfonso dos Santos (TLS)	1:00.01
Heat 2
1	Prasanna Amarasekara (SRI)	49.07
2	Supachai Phachsay (THA)	49.28
3	Aleksey Pogorelov (KGZ)	49.46
4	Zahir Naseer (MDV)	54.55
—	Yonas Al-Hosah (KSA)	DNS
Heat 3
1	Wang Liangyu (CHN)	47.94
2	Jukkatip Pojaroen (THA)	48.62
3	Mohammad Akefian (IRI)	49.17
4	Belal Al-Saari (YEM)	51.61
5	Bayandorjiin Khosbayar (MGL)	53.14
Heat 4
1	Reza Bouazar (IRI)	49.23
2	Chao Un Kei (MAC)	49.76
3	Ashoka Jayasundara (SRI)	49.80
4	Sou Chon Kin (MAC)	51.59

===== Semifinals =====
31 October

Rank	Athlete	Time
Heat 1
1	Wang Liangyu (CHN)	47.86
2	Reza Bouazar (IRI)	48.15
3	Jukkatip Pojaroen (THA)	48.17
4	Bibin Mathew (IND)	48.83
5	Chao Un Kei (MAC)	49.66
6	Ashoka Jayasundara (SRI)	50.08
Heat 2
1	Hamdan Al-Bishi (KSA)	47.98
2	Prasanna Amarasekara (SRI)	48.38
3	Mohammad Akefian (IRI)	48.58
4	Vinay Choudhary (IND)	48.98
5	Aleksey Pogorelov (KGZ)	49.51
6	Supachai Phachsay (THA)	52.90

===== Final =====
31 October

Rank	Athlete	Time
1st place, gold medalist(s)	Wang Liangyu (CHN)	46.08
2nd place, silver medalist(s)	Prasanna Amarasekara (SRI)	47.09
3rd place, bronze medalist(s)	Jukkatip Pojaroen (THA)	47.40
4	Reza Bouazar (IRI)	48.22
5	Hamdan Al-Bishi (KSA)	48.37
6	Mohammad Akefian (IRI)	49.06

==== 800 m ====
===== Round 1 =====
31 October

Rank	Athlete	Time
Heat 1
1	Sajeesh Joseph (IND)	1:56.57
2	Lau Tak Lung (HKG)	1:58.30
3	Ajmal Amirov (TJK)	2:01.06
4	Lei Chi Keong (MAC)	2:05.57
Heat 2
1	Rajeev Ramesan (IND)	1:57.11
2	Park Sung-soo (KOR)	1:58.33
3	Chan Hoi Kuan (MAC)	2:06.43
—	Sajjad Moradi (IRI)	DNF
—	Yousef Masrahi (KSA)	DNF
Heat 3
1	Mohammad Al-Azemi (KUW)	1:51.71
2	Ehsan Mohajer Shojaei (IRI)	1:52.18
3	Ali Al-Deraan (KSA)	1:52.74
4	Firdavs Azizov (TJK)	1:57.04
5	Belal Al-Saari (YEM)	1:57.47

===== Final =====
1 November

Rank	Athlete	Time
1st place, gold medalist(s)	Mohammad Al-Azemi (KUW)	1:49.62
2nd place, silver medalist(s)	Ehsan Mohajer Shojaei (IRI)	1:50.22
3rd place, bronze medalist(s)	Rajeev Ramesan (IND)	1:50.87
4	Sajeesh Joseph (IND)	1:51.41
5	Park Sung-soo (KOR)	1:53.34
6	Lau Tak Lung (HKG)	1:56.28

==== 1500 m ====
===== Round 1 =====
30 October

Rank	Athlete	Time
Heat 1
1	Abubaker Ali Kamal (QAT)	3:57.59
2	Denis Bagrev (KGZ)	3:58.11
3	Ajmal Amirov (TJK)	4:04.41
4	Yousef Masrahi (KSA)	4:11.28
5	Kezang Dorji (BHU)	4:20.68
6	Kuan Chi Hou (MAC)	4:22.43
—	Sajjad Moradi (IRI)	DNF
Heat 2
1	Omar Al-Rasheedi (KUW)	4:00.00
2	Rouhollah Mohammadi (IRI)	4:00.31
3	Hamza Chatholi (IND)	4:00.47
4	Sun Wenli (CHN)	4:01.00
5	Theerachai Rayabsri (THA)	4:01.66
6	Firdavs Azizov (TJK)	4:04.60
7	Boonyu Kaveerattanakajon (THA)	4:08.85
8	Ieong Chio Wa (MAC)	4:15.74

===== Final =====
31 October

Rank	Athlete	Time
1st place, gold medalist(s)	Hamza Chatholi (IND)	3:50.22
2nd place, silver medalist(s)	Omar Al-Rasheedi (KUW)	3:50.58
3rd place, bronze medalist(s)	Abubaker Ali Kamal (QAT)	3:50.78
4	Rouhollah Mohammadi (IRI)	3:52.94
5	Sun Wenli (CHN)	3:56.85
6	Theerachai Rayabsri (THA)	3:57.02
7	Denis Bagrev (KGZ)	3:57.37
8	Ajmal Amirov (TJK)	4:00.68
9	Firdavs Azizov (TJK)	4:08.46

==== 3000 m ====
1 November

Rank	Athlete	Time
1st place, gold medalist(s)	Charles Bett Koech (QAT)	8:04.69
2nd place, silver medalist(s)	Surendra Singh (IND)	8:04.99
3rd place, bronze medalist(s)	Sunil Kumar (IND)	8:10.07
4	Omar Al-Rasheedi (KUW)	8:13.15
5	Abubaker Ali Kamal (QAT)	8:13.59
6	Omid Mehrabi (IRI)	8:19.48
7	Denis Bagrev (KGZ)	8:27.77
8	Seo Haeng-jun (KOR)	8:33.45
9	Shi Linzhong (CHN)	8:36.66
10	Chan Chan Kit (MAC)	9:32.48
11	Augusto Ramos Soares (TLS)	9:37.67
12	Pema Tshewang (BHU)	9:45.67
13	Lau Kuan Lon (MAC)	9:52.81
14	Pasang Pasang (BHU)	10:02.34
—	Rouhollah Mohammadi (IRI)	DNS
—	Mukhlid Al-Otaibi (KSA)	DNS
—	Ajmal Amirov (TJK)	DNS

==== 60 m hurdles ====
===== Round 1 =====
31 October

Rank	Athlete	Time
Heat 1
1	Nazar Mukhametzhan (KAZ)	7.92
2	Fawaz Al-Shammari (KUW)	8.02
3	Muhammad Sajjad (PAK)	8.03
4	Jamras Rittidet (THA)	8.17
5	Ahmed Al-Muwallad (KSA)	8.20
6	Mandar Soasaleh (INA)	8.98
7	Satosh Kumar Shrestha (NEP)	11.04
Heat 2
1	Wu Youjia (CHN)	7.79
2	Narongdech Janjai (THA)	7.99
3	Sami Al-Haydar (KSA)	8.03
4	Husein Al-Youhah (KUW)	8.12
5	Tang Hon Sing (HKG)	8.14
6	Wong Wai In (MAC)	8.77
7	Iong Kim Fai (MAC)	9.13

===== Final =====
1 November

Rank	Athlete	Time
1st place, gold medalist(s)	Wu Youjia (CHN)	7.82
2nd place, silver medalist(s)	Narongdech Janjai (THA)	7.99
3rd place, bronze medalist(s)	Muhammad Sajjad (PAK)	8.02
4	Nazar Mukhametzhan (KAZ)	8.09
5	Sami Al-Haydar (KSA)	8.10
6	Husein Al-Youhah (KUW)	8.12
7	Tang Hon Sing (HKG)	8.15
8	Fawaz Al-Shammari (KUW)	8.19

==== 4 × 400 m relay ====
===== Round 1 =====
31 October

Rank	Team	Time
Heat 1
1	Thailand (THA)	3:18.15
2	India (IND)	3:20.08
3	Kuwait (KUW)	3:23.84
4	Macau (MAC)	3:25.93
Heat 2
1	Saudi Arabia (KSA)	3:13.67
2	Sri Lanka (SRI)	3:13.76
3	Iran (IRI)	3:18.54

===== Final =====
1 November

Rank	Team	Time
1st place, gold medalist(s)	Saudi Arabia (KSA)	3:11.29
2nd place, silver medalist(s)	Sri Lanka (SRI)	3:11.29
3rd place, bronze medalist(s)	Iran (IRI)	3:13.18
4	Thailand (THA)	3:13.22
5	India (IND)	3:16.81
6	Kuwait (KUW)	3:23.25

==== High jump ====
30 October – 1 November

Rank	Athlete	Qual.	Final
1st place, gold medalist(s)	Rashid Al-Mannai (QAT)	2.08	2.24
2nd place, silver medalist(s)	Sergey Zasimovich (KAZ)	2.12	2.21
3rd place, bronze medalist(s)	Kim Young-min (KOR)	2.08	2.21
4	Hari Shankar Roy (IND)	2.08	2.18
5	Hashem Al-Oqaibi (KSA)	2.12	2.15
6	Vitaliy Tsykunov (KAZ)	2.08	2.15
7	Salem Al-Anezi (KUW)	2.04	2.15
7	Wang Hao (CHN)	2.08	2.15
7	Jamel Fakhari (KSA)	2.08	2.15
10	Suchart Singhaklang (THA)	2.08	2.08
11	Nguyễn Thanh Phong (VIE)	2.04	2.04
12	Amin Hosseinzadeh Rahbar (IRI)	2.04	2.04
13	Syahrial (INA)	2.00	
14	Lei Kuok Kuan (MAC)	2.00	
—	Tsao Chih-hao (TPE)	NM	
—	Choi Hong Fai (MAC)	DNS	

==== Pole vault ====
30 October

Rank	Athlete	Result
1st place, gold medalist(s)	Liu Feiliang (CHN)	5.30
2nd place, silver medalist(s)	Ali Al-Sabaghah (KUW)	5.10
3rd place, bronze medalist(s)	Pendar Shoghian (IRI)	4.90
4	Alexandr Akhmedov (KAZ)	4.75
—	Mohsen Rabbani (IRI)	NM

==== Long jump ====
31 October

Rank	Athlete	Result
1st place, gold medalist(s)	Hussein Al-Sabee (KSA)	7.93
2nd place, silver medalist(s)	Keeratikorn Janmanee (THA)	7.59
3rd place, bronze medalist(s)	Konstantin Safronov (KAZ)	7.51
4	Saleh Al-Haddad (KUW)	7.49
5	Mohammad Arzandeh (IRI)	7.39
6	Husein Al-Youhah (KUW)	7.05
7	Kenneth Wang (SIN)	7.01
8	Leong Kin Kuan (MAC)	6.92
9	Võ Đan Điện (VIE)	6.84
10	Marc Habib (LIB)	6.73
11	Wong Pui Iam (MAC)	6.47
—	Gao Hongwei (CHN)	NM
—	Mohammed Al-Khuwalidi (KSA)	DNS

==== Triple jump ====
1 November

Rank	Athlete	Result
1st place, gold medalist(s)	Roman Valiyev (KAZ)	16.57
2nd place, silver medalist(s)	Wu Bo (CHN)	16.45
3rd place, bronze medalist(s)	Yevgeniy Ektov (KAZ)	16.34
4	Theerayut Philakong (THA)	15.83
5	Kim Dong-han (KOR)	15.78
6	Afshin Daghari Hemadi (IRI)	15.63
7	Renjith Maheshwary (IND)	15.59
8	Si Kuan Wong (MAC)	14.97
9	Kittisaki Sukon (THA)	14.81
10	Tam Chan Keong (MAC)	13.19
—	Bibu Mathew (IND)	DNS

==== Shot put ====
1 November

Rank	Athlete	Result
1st place, gold medalist(s)	Sultan Al-Hebshi (KSA)	18.99
2nd place, silver medalist(s)	Ahmad Gholoum (KUW)	18.88
3rd place, bronze medalist(s)	Mehdi Shahrokhi (IRI)	18.48
4	Chang Ming-huang (TPE)	17.93
5	Mashari Suroor (KUW)	17.29
6	Chatchawal Polyiam (THA)	17.15
7	Hwang In-sung (KOR)	17.11
8	Tian Yingchun (CHN)	16.90
9	Sourabh Vij (IND)	16.75
10	Kassem Mohammed Amine (QAT)	16.69
11	Sarayudh Pinitjit (THA)	16.61
12	Hou Fei (MAC)	13.17
—	Grigoriy Kamulya (UZB)	DNS

==== Heptathlon ====
31 October – 1 November

Rank	Athlete	60M	Long jump	Shot put	High jump	60M hurdles	Pole vault	1000M	Total
1st place, gold medalist(s)	P. J. Vinod (IND)	7.02; 875	7.18; 857	13.86; 720	1.91; 723	8.15; 944	4.50; 760	2:58.17; 682	5561
2nd place, silver medalist(s)	Pavel Dubitskiy (KAZ)	7.31; 775	6.92; 795	11.86; 598	2.06; 859	8.34; 898	4.50; 760	2:51.78; 747	5432
3rd place, bronze medalist(s)	Boonkete Chalon (THA)	7.09; 851	6.61; 723	11.83; 596	1.82; 644	8.53; 853	4.10; 645	2:53.02; 734	5046
4	Viravut Jumpatong (THA)	7.43; 736	6.59; 718	12.05; 609	1.88; 696	8.45; 872	4.20; 673	3:00.42; 660	4964
5	Mohammed Al-Matrud (KSA)	7.15; 830	6.82; 771	11.25; 561	1.70; 544	8.33; 900	4.00; 617	2:52.93; 735	4958
—	Hadi Sepehrzad (IRI)	DNS							DNS

=== Women ===
==== 60 m ====
30 October

===== Round 1 =====
Rank	Athlete	Time
Heat 1
1	Nongnuch Sanrat (THA)	7.37
2	Han Ling (CHN)	7.67
3	Gretta Taslakian (LIB)	7.69
4	Chan Ho Yee (HKG)	7.75
5	Choe Son-hwa (PRK)	7.90
6	Io In Chi (MAC)	8.20
7	Shaikha Saqar Al-Dosari (QAT)	8.45
—	Jauna Abdulla Nafiz (MDV)	DNS
Heat 2
1	Sangwan Jaksunin (THA)	7.62
2	Natalya Ivoninskaya (KAZ)	7.62
3	Wan Kin Yee (HKG)	7.73
4	Kim Ji-eun (KOR)	7.84
5	Cheong Im Wa (MAC)	7.87
6	Erdenebilegiin Ariuntungalag (MGL)	8.26
7	Ameena Al-Jehani (QAT)	8.74
—	Lyubov Perepelova (UZB)	DNS

===== Final =====
Rank	Athlete	Time
1st place, gold medalist(s)	Nongnuch Sanrat (THA)	7.28
2nd place, silver medalist(s)	Sangwan Jaksunin (THA)	7.49
3rd place, bronze medalist(s)	Natalya Ivoninskaya (KAZ)	7.59
4	Han Ling (CHN)	7.69
5	Chan Ho Yee (HKG)	7.71
6	Wan Kin Yee (HKG)	7.73
7	Kim Ji-eun (KOR)	7.87
—	Gretta Taslakian (LIB)	DNS

==== 400 m ====
===== Round 1 =====
30 October

Rank	Athlete	Time
Heat 1
1	Olga Tereshkova (KAZ)	55.00
2	Maryam Tousi (IRI)	55.37
3	M. R. Poovamma (IND)	56.79
4	Treewadee Yongphan (THA)	57.18
5	Batgereliin Möngöntuyaa (MGL)	57.84
6	Iong Pui I (MAC)	1:03.40
Heat 2
1	Tatyana Azarova (KAZ)	54.47
2	Tang Xiaoyin (CHN)	54.71
3	Saowalee Kaewchvay (THA)	55.17
4	Zohreh Farjam (IRI)	56.77
5	Sini Jose (IND)	57.01
6	Lam Ka Im (MAC)	58.85

===== Final =====
31 October

Rank	Athlete	Time
1st place, gold medalist(s)	Tang Xiaoyin (CHN)	53.56
2nd place, silver medalist(s)	Tatyana Azarova (KAZ)	53.68
3rd place, bronze medalist(s)	Olga Tereshkova (KAZ)	53.89
4	Saowalee Kaewchvay (THA)	54.86
5	Maryam Tousi (IRI)	55.13
6	Zohreh Farjam (IRI)	57.10

==== 800 m ====
===== Round 1 =====
31 October

Rank	Athlete	Time
Heat 1
1	Shin So-mang (KOR)	2:15.50
2	Antony Vijila (IND)	2:15.76
3	Buatip Boonprasert (THA)	2:18.19
4	Ölziitömöriin Uyanga (MGL)	2:21.30
5	Bùi Thị Hiền (VIE)	2:23.04
Heat 2
1	Viktoriya Yalovtseva (KAZ)	2:10.93
2	Mina Pourseifi (IRI)	2:11.38
3	Anna Kliushkina (KGZ)	2:12.76
4	Leong Ka Man (MAC)	2:25.16
Heat 3
1	Liu Qing (CHN)	2:12.44
2	Sinimole Paulose (IND)	2:13.68
3	Chuluunkhüügiin Shinetsetseg (MGL)	2:15.45
4	Wong Man Wa (MAC)	2:54.28

===== Final =====
1 November

Rank	Athlete	Time
1st place, gold medalist(s)	Liu Qing (CHN)	2:06.13
2nd place, silver medalist(s)	Sinimole Paulose (IND)	2:06.32
3rd place, bronze medalist(s)	Antony Vijila (IND)	2:06.75
4	Viktoriya Yalovtseva (KAZ)	2:07.79
5	Mina Pourseifi (IRI)	2:12.58
6	Shin So-mang (KOR)	2:13.86

==== 1500 m ====
31 October

Rank	Athlete	Time
1st place, gold medalist(s)	Sinimole Paulose (IND)	4:22.56
2nd place, silver medalist(s)	Svetlana Lukasheva (KAZ)	4:24.92
3rd place, bronze medalist(s)	Li Zhenzhu (CHN)	4:25.96
4	Bùi Thị Hiền (VIE)	4:30.68
5	Preeja Sreedharan (IND)	4:31.33
6	Chhaya Khatri (NEP)	4:46.13
7	Imes Borges da Silva (TLS)	5:11.99
8	Cheang Ka I (MAC)	5:27.43
—	Leila Ebrahimi (IRI)	DNF

==== 3000 m ====
1 November

Rank	Athlete	Time
1st place, gold medalist(s)	Chen Xiaofang (CHN)	9:23.11
2nd place, silver medalist(s)	Preeja Sreedharan (IND)	9:27.62
3rd place, bronze medalist(s)	Bùi Thị Hiền (VIE)	9:36.38
4	Pak Jong-nyo (PRK)	9:41.98
5	Baatarkhüügiin Battsetseg (MGL)	10:03.69
6	Rim Yon-hui (PRK)	10:04.39
—	Imes Borges da Silva (TLS)	DNF
—	Leila Ebrahimi (IRI)	DNS

==== 60 m hurdles ====
30 October

Rank	Athlete	Time
1st place, gold medalist(s)	Natalya Ivoninskaya (KAZ)	8.33
2nd place, silver medalist(s)	Zhang Rong (CHN)	8.35
3rd place, bronze medalist(s)	Anastassiya Vinogradova (KAZ)	8.48
4	Wallapa Pansoongneun (THA)	8.68
5	Bạch Phương Thảo (VIE)	8.70
6	Sepideh Tavakkoli (IRI)	9.32
7	Tam Sok Teng (MAC)	12.76
—	Trecia Roberts (THA)	DNS

==== 4 × 400 m relay ====
1 November

Rank	Team	Time
1st place, gold medalist(s)	Kazakhstan (KAZ)	3:37.59
2nd place, silver medalist(s)	Thailand (THA)	3:38.25
3rd place, bronze medalist(s)	India (IND)	3:41.09
4	Mongolia (MGL)	3:54.87
5	Iran (IRI)	3:58.11
6	Macau (MAC)	3:58.85

==== High jump ====
31 October

Rank	Athlete	Result
1st place, gold medalist(s)	Noengrothai Chaipetch (THA)	1.91
2nd place, silver medalist(s)	Yekaterina Yevseyeva (KAZ)	1.88
3rd place, bronze medalist(s)	Anna Ustinova (KAZ)	1.88
4	Bùi Thị Nhung (VIE)	1.84
5	Zahra Nabizadeh (IRI)	1.80
5	Wanida Boonwan (THA)	1.80
7	Sepideh Tavakkoli (IRI)	1.70
8	Ng Ka Man (MAC)	1.50
9	Ng Ka Ian (MAC)	1.50
—	Shaikha Ali (QAT)	NM
—	Mooza Ali (QAT)	NM
—	Nadiya Dusanova (UZB)	DNS

==== Pole vault ====
31 October

Rank	Athlete	Result
1st place, gold medalist(s)	Ni Putu Desi Margawati (INA)	3.75
2nd place, silver medalist(s)	Sunisa Kaoiad (THA)	3.60
3rd place, bronze medalist(s)	Pasuta Wongwieng (THA)	3.40
4	Rachel Yang (SIN)	3.20
—	Wu Sha (CHN)	NM

==== Long jump ====
1 November

Rank	Athlete	Result
1st place, gold medalist(s)	Chen Yaling (CHN)	6.45
2nd place, silver medalist(s)	Thitima Muangjan (THA)	6.04
3rd place, bronze medalist(s)	Sirada Seechaichana (THA)	5.82
4	Kang Hye-sun (PRK)	5.44
5	Wong Hiu Yan (HKG)	5.38
6	Wong Kit Fei (SIN)	5.27
7	Ameena Al-Jehani (QAT)	4.17

==== Triple jump ====
30 October

Rank	Athlete	Result
1st place, gold medalist(s)	Irina Litvinenko (KAZ)	13.56
2nd place, silver medalist(s)	Thitima Muangjan (THA)	13.42
3rd place, bronze medalist(s)	Kang Hye-sun (PRK)	12.90
4	Maria Natalia Londa (INA)	12.81
—	Qiu Huijing (CHN)	NM
—	Olga Rypakova (KAZ)	DNS

==== Shot put ====
31 October

Rank	Athlete	Result
1st place, gold medalist(s)	Li Fengfeng (CHN)	16.33
2nd place, silver medalist(s)	Juttaporn Krasaeyan (THA)	15.69
3rd place, bronze medalist(s)	Tin Ka Yin (HKG)	11.71
4	Wong Kit Man (MAC)	11.57
5	Ho Ka I (MAC)	11.00
6	Lee Ka Shun (HKG)	10.45

==== Pentathlon ====
30 October

Rank	Athlete	60M hurdles	High jump	Shot put	Long jump	800M	Total
1st place, gold medalist(s)	Irina Naumenko (KAZ)	8.80; 952	1.75; 916	12.59; 700	6.06; 868	2:26.10; 743	4179
2nd place, silver medalist(s)	Liu Haili (CHN)	8.75; 963	1.75; 916	12.09; 667	5.96; 837	2:31.04; 680	4063
3rd place, bronze medalist(s)	Watcharaporn Masim (THA)	8.96; 918	1.75; 916	11.56; 632	5.48; 694	2:50.96; 454	3614
4	Nguyễn Thị Đào (VIE)	9.10; 889	NM; 0	10.54; 565	5.45; 686	2:30.22; 690	2830
—	Wassana Winatho (THA)	8.51; 1015	1.72; 879	11.72; 643	NM; 0	DNS	DNF
