= Kurash at the 2007 Asian Indoor Games =

- Venue: IPM Multisport Pavilion
- Dates: 2 November 2007

Kurash was a demonstration sport at the 2007 Asian Indoor Games was held in IPM Multisport Pavilion, Macau, China on 2 November 2007.

== Medalists ==
=== Men ===
Event	Gold	Silver	Bronze
−73 kg	Ali Maloumat; Iran	Suhrob Dustov; Uzbekistan	Naoya Ogasawara; Japan
−73 kg	Ali Maloumat; Iran	Suhrob Dustov; Uzbekistan	Fazel Manan Azimi; Afghanistan
+90 kg	Saeid Khosravinejad; Iran	Kohei Yoshioka; Japan	Fazliddin Meyliev; Uzbekistan
+90 kg	Saeid Khosravinejad; Iran	Kohei Yoshioka; Japan	Alexandre Magno Jorge; Macau

=== Women ===
Event	Gold	Silver	Bronze
−63 kg	Toktam Bidel; Iran	Chi Shu-wen; Chinese Taipei	Ng Ying Lai; Hong Kong
−63 kg	Toktam Bidel; Iran	Chi Shu-wen; Chinese Taipei	Chan Chi Weng; Macau
+78 kg	Lin Bei-yun; Chinese Taipei	Sahar Chaghalvand; Iran	None awarded
+78 kg	Lin Bei-yun; Chinese Taipei	Sahar Chaghalvand; Iran	None awarded

== Medal table ==
Rank	Nation	Gold	Silver	Bronze	Total
1	Iran (IRI)	3	1	0	4
2	Chinese Taipei (TPE)	1	1	0	2
3	Japan (JPN)	0	1	1	2
3	Uzbekistan (UZB)	0	1	1	2
5	Macau (MAC)	0	0	2	2
6	Afghanistan (AFG)	0	0	1	1
6	Hong Kong (HKG)	0	0	1	1
Totals (7 entries)		4	4	6	14

== Results ==
=== Men ===
==== 73 kg ====
2 November

Quarterfinals
Suhrob Dustov (UZB)	W
Chen Chun-hsiao (TPE)
Tömörbaataryn Pürev-Ochir (MGL)
Naoya Ogasawara (JPN)	W
Chan Tin Wai (HKG)
Ali Maloumat (IRI)	W

Semifinals
Suhrob Dustov (UZB)	W
Naoya Ogasawara (JPN)
Ali Maloumat (IRI)	W
Fazel Manan Azimi (AFG)

Final
Suhrob Dustov (UZB)
Ali Maloumat (IRI)	W

==== +81 kg ====
2 November

Quarterfinals
Saeid Khosravinejad (IRI)	W
Chen Chun-yu (TPE)
Fazliddin Meyliev (UZB)	W
Pürevsüreniin Nyamsüren (MGL)
Alexandre Magno Jorge (MAC)	W
Fong Ting Wai (HKG)
Kohei Yoshioka (JPN)	W
Ekramuddin Ahmadi (AFG)

Semifinals
Saeid Khosravinejad (IRI)	W
Fazliddin Meyliev (UZB)
Alexandre Magno Jorge (MAC)
Kohei Yoshioka (JPN)	W

Final
Saeid Khosravinejad (IRI)	W
Kohei Yoshioka (JPN)

=== Women ===
==== 63 kg ====
2 November

Semifinals		Final
Ng Ying Lai (HKG)
Toktam Bidel (IRI)	W	Toktam Bidel (IRI)	W
Chan Chi Weng (MAC)		Chi Shu-wen (TPE)
Chi Shu-wen (TPE)	W

==== +78 kg ====
2 November

Final
Sahar Chaghalvand (IRI)
Lin Bei-yun (TPE)	W
