= Indoor hockey at the 2007 Asian Indoor Games =

- Venue: Macau Stadium Pavilion
- Dates: 26 October – 2 November 2007

Indoor hockey at the 2007 Asian Indoor Games was held in Macau, China from 26 October to 3 November 2007.

== Medalists ==
Event	Gold	Silver	Bronze
Men	Iran; Majid Khalaji; Mehdi Malekahmadi; Yaghoub Bahrami; Morteza Ahmadi; Masoud Bohlouli; Ali Malekahmadi; Aref Mohammadi; Reza Abbasi; Reza Norouzzadeh; Reza Fattahi; Javad Shabani; Jafar Fareghi	South Korea; Hong Doo-pyo; Lee Byeong-jun; Jung Hwan-uk; Kim Cheol-young; Yeo Chang-yong; Jeong Yun-sang; Cho Jin-ho; Ahn Hyung-jun; Kim Kwang-jin; Park Young-jun; Kim Seong-kyu; Cho Sung-jin	India; P. R. Sreejesh; Danish Mujtaba; Yudhvir Singh; Sunil Ekka; Ravi Pal; Amardeep Ekka; C. B. Alemada; Kulwinder Singh; Hardeep Singh; Diwakar Ram; K. M. Somanna; R. M. Pfokrelo

== Results ==
=== Preliminary ===
Pos	Team	Pld	W	D	L	GF	GA	GD	Pts
1	Iran	5	4	1	0	28	9	+19	13
2	South Korea	5	3	1	1	24	18	+6	10
3	Malaysia	5	2	3	0	26	14	+12	9
4	India	5	2	0	3	18	14	+4	6
5	Macau	5	0	2	3	10	28	−18	2
6	Hong Kong	5	0	1	4	11	34	−23	1

Source: Official website

26 October
10:00

Hong Kong	4–5	South Korea
As. Ali 14', 33'; Bal 24'; Smith 29'	Report	Jung Hwan-uk 3'; Kim Kwang-jin 15'; Ahn Hyung-jun 19'; Kim Seong-kyu 25'; Cho Jin-ho 26'

Macau Stadium Pavilion, Macau
Umpires:
David Saunders (AUS)
Hassan Yarinia (IRI)

26 October
11:15

Iran	2–1	India
Khalaji 17'; Abbasi 38'	Report	Sreejesh 40+'

Macau Stadium Pavilion, Macau
Umpires:
Lee Ka Ming (HKG)
K. Paramasivam (MAS)

27 October
18:15

Malaysia	4–4	Macau
Keevan Raj 5'; Kuhan 12'; Rahim 33'; Prabahkaran 34'	Report	Leong Lap Man 11', 23', 37'; Lei Kwok Hung 16'

Macau Stadium Pavilion, Macau
Umpires:
Gary Simmonds (RSA)
Tabassum Nazar (HKG)

27 October
19:30

India	6–0	Hong Kong
Pal 4', 37'; Ram 5'; H. Singh 22'; Mujtaba 38', 40+'	Report

Macau Stadium Pavilion, Macau
Umpires:
David Saunders (AUS)
K. Kanaisan (MAS)

28 October
18:15

South Korea	5–1	Macau
Jeong Yun-sang 6'; Ahn Hyung-jun 16'; Kim Kwang-jin 20+'; Jung Hwan-uk 35'; Cho Sung-jin 40+'	Report	Lou Chio Iong 24'

Macau Stadium Pavilion, Macau
Umpires:
David Saunders (AUS)
Hassan Abazari (IRI)

28 October
19:30

India	2–4	Malaysia
Mujtaba 13'; Alemada 33'	Report	Mat Radzi 12'; Kuhan 18'; Keevan Raj 36'; Ponirin 40+'

Macau Stadium Pavilion, Macau
Umpires:
Paolo Fernandes (MAC)
Gary Simmonds (RSA)

29 October
18:15

Malaysia	4–4	South Korea
Kuhan 3', 9', 12', 28'	Report	Jeong Yun-sang 5', 20', 34'; Kim Seong-kyu 14'

Macau Stadium Pavilion, Macau
Umpires:
Tabassum Nazar (HKG)
Ieong Iek Seng (MAC)

29 October
19:30

Hong Kong	2–8	Iran
Fan Cheuk Ming 15'; Smith 33'	Report	Norouzzadeh 2', 16'; Shabani 8'; Mohammadi 11'; Bohlouli 26'; Abbasi 32', 36', 38'

Macau Stadium Pavilion, Macau
Umpires:
K. Kanaisan (MAS)
Paolo Fernandes (MAC)

30 October
18:30

South Korea	3–5	Iran
Jeong Yun-sang 25', 34'; Kim Kwang-jin 30'	Report	Norouzzadeh 6', 14', 16', 23'; Bohlouli 35'

Macau Stadium Pavilion, Macau
Umpires:
David Saunders (AUS)
Ieong Iek Seng (MAC)

30 October
19:45

Macau	4–4	Hong Kong
Lou Chio Iong 15', 35'; Leong Lap Man 26'; Lei Kwok Hung 37'	Report	Smith 20+'; As. Ali 29', 36', 40+'

Macau Stadium Pavilion, Macau
Umpires:
Gary Simmonds (RSA)
Hassan Abazari (IRI)

31 October
18:15

Malaysia	3–3	Iran
Kuhan 14', 22'; Keevan Raj 20'	Report	Abbasi 15'; Norouzzadeh 35', 40'

Macau Stadium Pavilion, Macau
Umpires:
Gary Simmonds (RSA)
Paolo Fernandes (MAC)

31 October
19:30

Macau	1–5	India
Lei Kwok Hung 6'	Report	Y. Singh 19', 23'; H. Singh 19'; Ram 27'; Pal 39'

Macau Stadium Pavilion, Macau
Umpires:
K. Kanaisan (MAS)
Tabassum Nazar (HKG)

1 November
17:00

Hong Kong	1–11	Malaysia
Ak. Ali 24'	Report	Prabahkaran 8', 13', 31'; Mat Radzi 16', 17', 32'; Kuhan 20', 29'; Rahim 26', 28'; Logan Raj 33'

Macau Stadium Pavilion, Macau
Umpires:
Gary Simmonds (RSA)
Ieong Iek Seng (MAC)

1 November
18:15

Iran	10–0	Macau
Shabani 14', 16', 22', 24', 29'; Norouzzadeh 28'; Mohammadi 31', 36', 40'; Khalaji 36'	Report

Macau Stadium Pavilion, Macau
Umpires:
Tabassum Nazar (HKG)
David Saunders (AUS)

1 November
19:30

India	4–7	South Korea
Alemada 8'; Y. Singh 11'; Pal 22'; Ram 39'	Report	Kim Seong-kyu 5', 17', 28'; Jeong Yun-sang 9', 30', 40'; Ahn Hyung-jun 32'

Macau Stadium Pavilion, Macau
Umpires:
Hassan Abazari (IRI)
K. Kanaisan (MAS)

=== Final round ===
==== Classification 5th–6th ====
2 November
17:00

Macau	2–2	Hong Kong
Lou Chio Iong 4'; Lei Kwok Hung 27'	Report	Bal 2'; Smith 35'
Penalties
Lou Chio Iong (penalty shoot-out scored); Lei Kwok Hung (penalty shoot-out missed); Leong Lap Man (penalty shoot-out missed); Wong Peng Po (penalty shoot-out missed); Lao Chi Lim (penalty shoot-out scored) --- Lou Chio Iong (penalty shoot-out scored); Lei Kwok Hung (penalty shoot-out missed)	3–4	(penalty shoot-out scored) Smith; (penalty shoot-out missed) As. Ali; (penalty shoot-out missed) Saeed; (penalty shoot-out scored) Chhina; (penalty shoot-out missed) Bal --- (penalty shoot-out scored) Chhina; (penalty shoot-out scored) Smith

Macau Stadium Pavilion, Macau
Umpires:
K. Kanaisan (MAS)
Hassan Abazari (IRI)

==== Bronze medal match ====
2 November
18:30

Malaysia	4–7	India
Ismail 9'; Nishel Kumar 25'; Rahim 37', 40'	Report	Ram 3'; Pal 4'; Y. Singh 12', 33', 35', 35'; Alemada 22'

Macau Stadium Pavilion, Macau
Umpires:
Ieong Iek Seng (MAC)
Tabassum Nazar (HKG)

==== Gold medal match ====
2 November
20:00

Iran	7–0	South Korea
Norouzzadeh 7'; Mohammadi 10'; Bohlouli 20', 26', 32'; A. Malekahmadi 21'; M. Malekahmadi 38'	Report

Macau Stadium Pavilion, Macau
Umpires:
David Saunders (AUS)
Gary Simmonds (RSA)
