= Ali Maloumat =

Iranian judoka (born 1981)

Personal information
- Born: 22 November 1981 (age 44)
- Occupation: Judoka

Sport
- Country: Iran
- Sport: Judo
- Weight class: ‍–‍73 kg

Achievements and titles
- Olympic Games: 5th (2008)
- World Champ.: R64 (2007, 2009, 2010, 2011)
- Asian Champ.: (gold) (2008)
Medal record
Men's judo
Representing Iran
Asian Championships
| Gold medal – first place | 2008 Jeju | ‍–‍73 kg |
| Bronze medal – third place | 2011 Abu Dhabi | ‍–‍73 kg |
IJF Grand Prix
| Bronze medal – third place | 2009 Hamburg | ‍–‍73 kg |
Men's kurash
Asian Indoor Games
| Gold medal – first place | 2007 Macau | ‍–‍73 kg |

Profile at external databases
- IJF: 239
- JudoInside.com: 46788
- Updated on 3 January 2023

Ali Maloumat (Persian: علی معلومات (born 22 November 1981) Chenaran) is an Iranian judoka.

Maloumat competed for Iran at the following tournaments:

- 2007 German Open, Braunschweig, 7th
- Kurash at the 2007 Asian Indoor Games, Gold Medal
- 2007 Asian Judo Championships, 5th place
- 2008 Summer Olympics, 5th place
- 2008 Asian Judo Championships, Gold Medal
- 2009 World Judo Championships, Rotterdam
- 2010 World Judo Championships, 1st round
- 2010 Asian Games, Preliminary
- 2011 Asian Judo Championships, Bronze Medal
- 2011 World Judo Championships, 2nd round
- 2011 Grand Slam, Brazil
- 2011 World Cup, Baku
- 2012 World Cup, Prague
