= Surendra Singh (athlete) =

Indian long-distance runner

Medal record

Men's athletics

Representing India

Asian Indoor Championships
Silver medal – second place	2008 Doha	3000 m

Surendra Kumar Singh (born 1 October 1978) is an Indian long-distance runner who represented India at the 2008 Summer Olympics in Beijing in the 10,000 metres. He placed 26th in the event. He holds the Indian records for the 3000 metres and 10,000 m with times of 7:50.31 minutes and 28:02.89 minutes, respectively.

He competed for his country in the 5000 m and 10,000 m at the 2006 Asian Games and placed sixth in both distances. At the 2007 Asian Indoor Games he was the silver medallist behind Qatar's Charles Bett Koech over 3000 metres. He also represented India at the 2007 Asian Championships in Jordan, participating in the 5000 metres and 10,000 m events finishing fifth in both. At the 2008 Asian Indoor Athletics Championships he was again runner-up to a Kenyan-born Qatari in the 3000 m (Sultan Khamis Zaman on this occasion).

He won the 3000 m in the 2009 Asian Athletics Grand Prix. He competed on the world stage over 10,000 m that year at the 2009 World Championships in Athletics and placed 19th in a large field of runners.
