= Lai Chi Wai =

Chinese rock climber (born 1982)

Personal information
- Nationality: Hong Konger
- Born: December 25, 1982 (age 43)

Climbing career
- Type of climber: Competition climbing; Rock climbing, Speed climbing; Buildering
Medal record
Asian Championships
Silver medal – second place	2000	Speed
Gold medal – first place	2002	Speed
Gold medal – first place	2003	Speed
Silver medal – second place	2006	Speed

Lai Chi Wai (Chinese: 黎志偉; born December 25, 1982) is a rock climber, competition climber, and a motivational speaker from Hong Kong. He is a four-time champion of the Asian Rock Climbing Championships and the world's first Chinese winner of the X-Game's extreme sports.

== Accident ==
In 2011, he got into a serious traffic accident that left him paraplegic. On December 9, 2016, upon the 5th anniversary of the car accident, Lai climbed up Lion Rock in a wheelchair, and became the first Chinese athlete to be nominated for the Laureus World's Best Sporting Moment of the month, which he lost to a viral video which showed a packed sports stadium of 70,000 people in Iowa turning and waving to children in an adjacent hospital.

Netizens, touched by Lai's achievement, said he embodied the "spirit of Lion Rock", which has come to symbolize Hong Kong's can-do spirit in the midst of adversities. On January 16, 2021, Lai attempted to climb the 320-metre Nina Tower as an urban climb of over 300 metres; it was a fund-raising activity organized by Ignite Community Services, a non-profit organization which Lai co-founded with Stella Chiu, for spinal cord injured patients. However, after he had climbed 65 storeys or 250 metres, he was forced to call off due to strong winds. The charity challenge successfully raised about US$1 million. The attempt was originally scheduled for January 9 but was postponed because of bad weather.

== Personal life ==
He is married and has a son.
