= Nguyễn Thị Thanh An =

Vietnamese chess player

Personal information
- Born: 17 June 1976 (age 50)

Chess career
- Country: Vietnam
- Title: Woman Grandmaster (2005)
- Peak rating: 2358 (January 2005)

Nguyễn Thị Thanh An (born 17 June 1976) is a Vietnamese chess player. She holds the title of woman grandmaster.

With the Vietnamese national women's team she took part in Chess Olympiads: 2000 in Istanbul, 2002 in Bled, 2004 in Calvia, 2006 in Turin, 2010 in Khanty-Mansiysk, 2016 in Baku.

In 2007 and 2011 she participated in the World Team Chess Championship.
