= Mariya Sergeyeva =

Kazakhstani chess player (born 1983)

Maria Sergeyeva
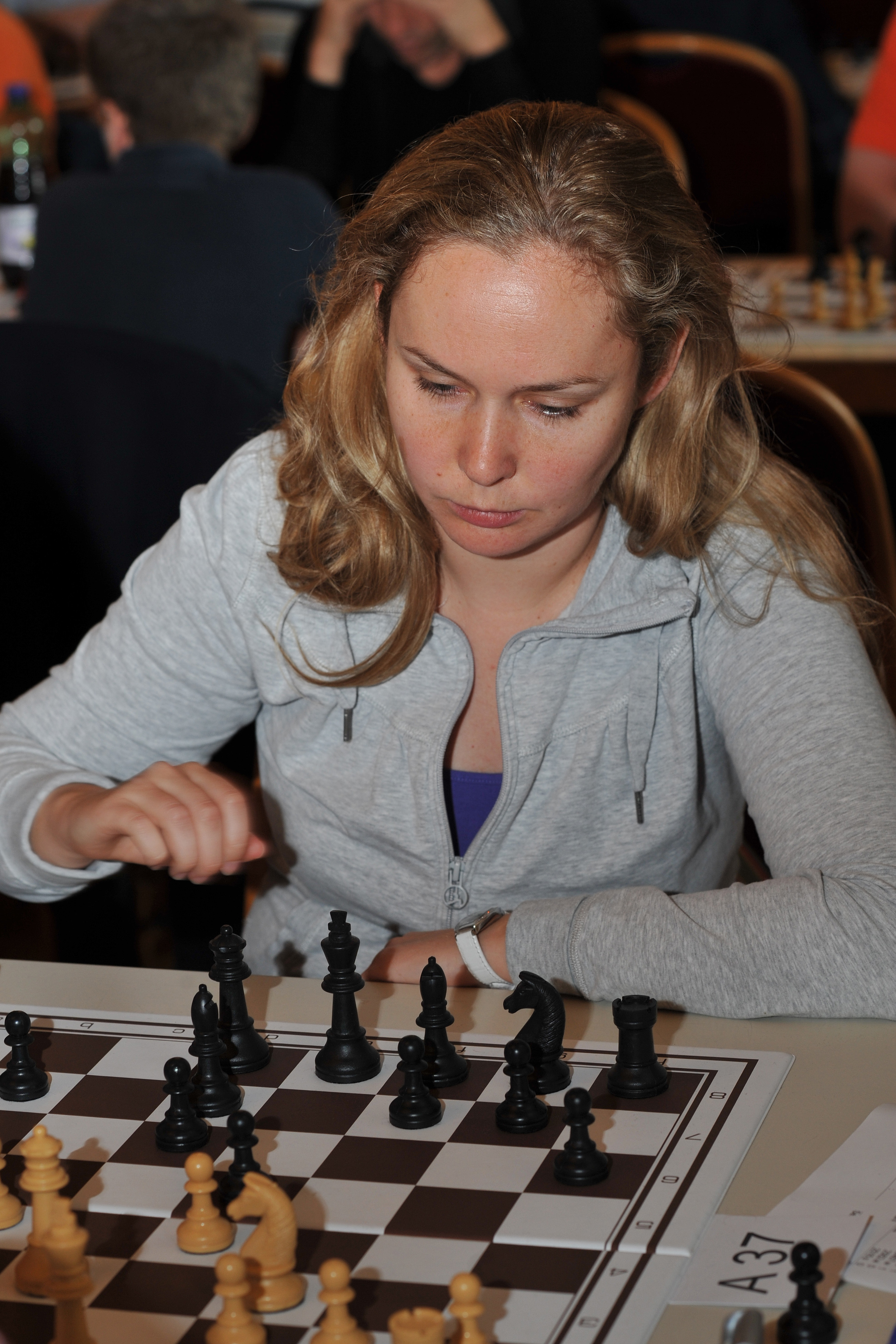
- Sergeyeva in 2013

Personal information
- Born: 12 April 1983 (age 43)

Chess career
- Country: Kazakhstan
- Title: Woman Grandmaster (2001)
- FIDE rating: 2262 (May 2022)
- Peak rating: 2377 (January 2009)

Maria Sergeyeva (born 12 April 1983) is a Kazakhstani chess player who holds the FIDE title of Woman Grandmaster (WGM).

== Biography ==
Four times Sergeyeva has represented Kazakhstan at the World Girls' Junior Chess Championships (1997, 1999, 2001, 2003), which achieved the best result in 2003, when she ranked 8th place. In 2004, Maria Sergeyeva participated in Women's World Chess Championship by knock-out system and in the first round lost to Alexandra Kosteniuk.

Sergeyeva played for Kazakhstan:

- in Women's Chess Olympiad participated 6 times (1998–2004, 2008, 2012);
- in Women's Asian Team Chess Championship participated in 2003 and won individual silver medal;
- in Asian Indoor Games participated in 2007.

In 2001, she received the FIDE Woman Grandmaster (WGM) title and in 2016 the FIDE Trainer (FT) title.
