= Shayesteh Ghaderpour =

Iranian chess player (born 1984)

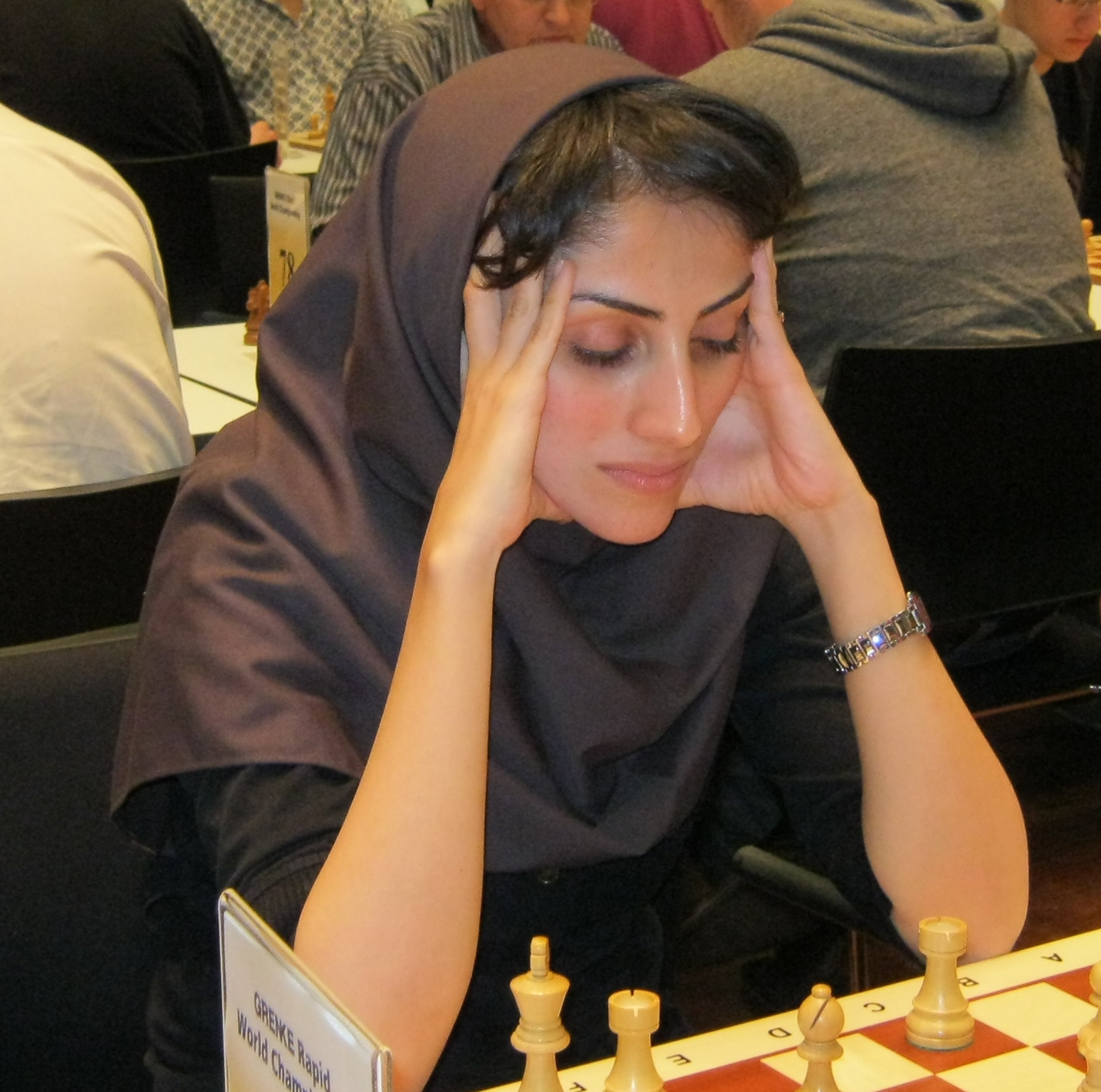
- Ghaderpour in 2010

Personal information
- Born: 10 April 1984 (age 42) Kermanshah, Iran

Chess career
- Country: Iran
- Title: Woman International Master (2001)
- FIDE rating: 2147 (July 2023)
- Peak rating: 2252 (September 2011)

Shayesteh Ghaderpour (Persian: شایسته قادرپور; born 10 April 1984), also known as Shayesteh Ghader Pour, is an Iranian chess player who holds the title of Woman International Master. She is a silver medalist the Iranian Women's Chess Championship and has represented Iran at six Chess Olympiads.

== Biography ==
In 2009, Shayesteh Ghader Pour won Iranian Women's Rapid Chess Championship. In 2011, she won West Asian Zonal Women's Chess Championship and was given the right to participate in Women's World Chess Championship. In 2012, she was second in Iranian Women's Chess Championship (tournament won Mitra Hejazipour). In 2012, in Khanty-Mansiysk Shayesteh Ghader Pour made her debut at the Women's World Chess Championship, where in the first round she lost to Pia Cramling.

Shayesteh Ghader Pour has played for Iran:

- at six Women's Chess Olympiads (1996, 2002, 2006–2012);
- at five Women's Asian Team Chess Championships (2005–2014), where she won two team bronze (2009, 2014) medals, and individual silver (2005) and bronze (2008) medals;
- at Asian Games team chess tournament in 2010;
- at two Asian Indoor Games team chess tournaments (2007–2009).
