= India at the 2007 Asian Indoor Games =

- IOC code: IND
- NOC: Indian Olympic Association

in Macau
- Medals Ranked 6th: Gold 9 Silver 9 Bronze 10 Total 28

Asian Indoor Games appearances
- 2005; 2007; 2009; 2013; 2017; 2021; 2026

India participated in the 2007 Asian Indoor Games held in Macau, China from October 26 to November 3. India finished at 6th place with 9 Gold, 9 Silver and 10 Bronze medals taking Total medals tally to 28.

== Medalists ==
Medal	Name	Sport	Event	Date
Gold	Krishnan Sasikiran	Chess	Men's individual - Rapid	October 27
Gold	Dronavalli Harika	Chess	Women's individual - Rapid	October 27
Gold	India; Krishnan Sasikiran; Surya Shekhar Ganguly; Chakkravarthy Deepan; Koneru Humpy; Dronavalli Harika; Tania Sachdev	Chess	Mixed team - Rapid	October 26–27
Gold	Sinimol Paulose	Indoor athletics	Women - 1500 m	October 31
Gold	Chatholi Hamza	Indoor athletics	Men - 1500 m	October 31
Gold	P. J. Vinod	Indoor athletics	Men - Heptathlon	November 1
Gold	Krishnan Sasikiran	Chess	Men's individual - Blitz	November 2
Gold	Koneru Humpy	Chess	Women's individual - Blitz	November 2
Gold	India	Kabaddi	Men	November 3
Silver	India; Krishnan Sasikiran; Surya Shekhar Ganguly; Arun Prasad Subramanian; Koneru Humpy; Dronavalli Harika; Tania Sachdev	Chess	Mixed team - Blitz	November 3
Silver	India; Krishnan Sasikiran; Surya Shekhar Ganguly; Chakkravarthy Deepan; Koneru Humpy; Dronavalli Harika; Meenakshi Subbaraman	Chess	Mixed team - Classic	October 28–30
Silver	Geet Sethi	Cue Sports	English billiards - Singles	November 2
Silver	Surendra Singh	Indoor athletics	Men - 3000 m	October 31
Silver	Sinimol Paulose	Indoor athletics	Women - 800 m	November 1
Silver	Preeja Sreedharan	Indoor athletics	Women - 3000 m	October 31
Silver	Sandeep Shukla	Muay	Middleweight 71–75 kg)	November 3
Silver	Sandeep Sejwal	swimming	50 m breaststroke	October 31
Silver	Sandeep Sejwal	swimming	100 m breaststroke	October 30
Bronze	Dronavalli Harika	Chess	Women's individual - Classic	October 31
Bronze	Yasin Merchant; Alok Kumar; Manan Chandra	Cue Sports	Snooker - Team	October 31
Bronze	Rajeev Ramesan	Indoor athletics	Men - 800 m	November 1
Bronze	Sunil Kumar	Indoor athletics	Men - 3000 m	October 31
Bronze	Antony Vijila	Indoor athletics	Women - 800 m	November 1
Bronze	Anu Maria Jose; Antony Vijila; Sini Jose; Sini Jose	Indoor athletics	Women - 4 × 400 m relay	November 1
Bronze	India	Indoor hockey	Men	November 3
Bronze	Albert Kujur	Muay	Flyweight (48–51 kg)	November 1
Bronze	Mohammed Imaduddin Naveed	Muay	Lightweight (57–60 kg)	October 31
Bronze	Balakrishna Shekhar Shetty	Muay	Light middleweight (67–71 kg)	November 1

== Chess ==
India won 5 Gold, 2 Silver and 1 Bronze medal in Chess, making it as most productive sport in 2007 Asian Indoor Games for India.

== Cue Sports ==
India won 1 silver and 1 bronze medal in Cue sports. Geet Sethi won silver in English billiards - Singles and Indian Team won Bronze in Snooker team event with Yasin Merchant, Alok Kumar and Manan Chandra as team members.

== Indoor athletics ==
India won 3 Gold, 3 Silver and 4 Bronze medals in Indoor athletics.

== Indoor hockey ==
India won bronze medal in Indoor hockey. Indian Team defeated Malaysia by 7–4 to win bronze medal.

== Kabaddi ==
India won gold medal in Kabaddi. In group stages India remains undefeated and faced Pakistan in Finals. In Final, India defeated Pakistan by 35–17.

== Muay ==
India won 1 silver and 3 bronze medals. Sandeep Shukla won silver medal in Middleweight category. Albert Kujur in Flyweight, Mohammed Imaduddin Naveed in Lightweight and Balakrishna Shekhar Shetty in Light middleweight won bronze medals.
