= 2012 Uber Cup qualification =

Tournament details
- Dates: February 13, 2012 – February 29, 2012
- Venue: BA: Macao Forum; BCA: Arat Kilo Hall; BE: Sporthallen Zuid; BO: Ken Kay Badminton Stadium; BPA: Los Angeles Badminton Club
- Location: BA: Macau; BCA: Addis Ababa, Ethiopia; BE: Amsterdam, Netherlands; BO: Ballarat, Australia; BPA: El Monte, United States

The 2012 Uber Cup qualification process is a series of tournaments organised by the five BWF confederations to decide 10 of the 12 teams which will play in the 2012 Thomas Cup, with China qualifying automatically as hosts and South Korea as trophy holders.

== Qualified teams ==
Country	Confederation	Qualified as	Qualified on	Final appearance
China	Badminton Asia	2012 Uber Cup hosts	3 June 2011	15th
South Korea	Badminton Asia	2010 Uber Cup winners	15 May 2010	15th
South Africa	Badminton Africa	2012 Uber Cup Preliminaries for Africa winners	29 February 2012	5th
Indonesia	Badminton Asia	Fifth place at the 2012 Badminton Asia Uber Cup Preliminaries	19 February 2012	21st
Japan	Badminton Asia	2012 Badminton Asia Uber Cup Preliminaries winners	19 February 2012	21st
Thailand	Badminton Asia	2012 Badminton Asia Uber Cup Preliminaries semifinalists	19 February 2012	3rd
Chinese Taipei	Badminton Asia	2012 Badminton Asia Uber Cup Preliminaries semifinalists	19 February 2012	3rd
Denmark	Badminton Europe	2012 European Team Championships runners-up	19 February 2012	17th
Germany	Badminton Europe	2012 European Team Championships winners	19 February 2012	6th
Netherlands	Badminton Europe	Third place at the 2012 European Team Championships	19 February 2012	10th
Australia	Badminton Oceania	2012 Uber Cup Preliminaries for Oceania winners	19 February 2012	5th
United States	Badminton Pan Am	2012 Pan American Uber Cup Preliminaries winners	19 February 2012	10th

== Qualification process ==
The number of teams participating in the final tournament is 12. The allocation of slots for each confederation is the same allocation from 2004 tournament; 4 from Asia, 3 from Europe, and 1 from each Africa, Oceania and Pan Am. Two automatic qualifiers are the host and defending champion.

== Confederation qualification ==
=== Badminton Confederation of Africa ===
The qualification for the African teams was held from 22 to 29 February 2012, at the Arat Kilo Hall in Addis Ababa, Ethiopia. The winners of the African qualification will qualify for the Uber Cup.

==== Teams in contention ====
Teams qualified for the Group stage

- Egypt
- Ethiopia
- Mauritius
- Morocco
- Nigeria
- South Africa
- Uganda

==== First round (group stage) ====
Advance to Knockout stage

Group A

Pos	Team	Pld	Pts
1	South Africa	3	3
2	Mauritius	3	2
3	Uganda	3	1
4	Ethiopia (H)	3	0

Source: BWF
(H) Host
Group B

Pos	Team	Pld	Pts
1	Nigeria	2	2
2	Egypt	2	1
3	Morocco	2	0

Source: BWF

==== Second round (knockout stage) ====
Semi-finals
25 February
South Africa	3
Egypt	0
25 February
Mauritius	2
Nigeria	3

Final
26 February
South Africa	3
Nigeria	1

=== Badminton Asia ===
The qualification for the Asian teams was held from 13 to 19 February 2012, at the Macao Forum in Sé, Macau. The semi-finalists of the Asian qualification will qualify for the Uber Cup. Since China qualified automatically as hosts and defending champions, an extra slot will be awarded to the team that finishes first in the classification round.

==== Teams in contention ====
Teams qualified for the Group stage

- China
- Chinese Taipei
- Hong Kong
- Indonesia
- India
- Japan
- Kazakhstan
- Macau
- Malaysia
- Singapore
- Sri Lanka
- Thailand
- Vietnam

==== First round (group stage) ====
Advance to Knockout stage

Group W
Group X

Pos	Team	Pld	Pts
1	China	2	2
2	Malaysia	2	1
3	India	2	0

Source: BadmintonCN

Pos	Team	Pld	Pts
1	Chinese Taipei	2	2
2	Singapore	2	1
3	Vietnam	2	0

Source: BadmintonCN
Group Y
Group Z

Pos	Team	Pld	Pts
1	Thailand	3	3
2	Indonesia	3	2
3	Sri Lanka	3	1
4	Kazakhstan	3	0

Source: BadmintonCN

Pos	Team	Pld	Pts
1	Japan	2	2
2	Hong Kong	2	1
3	Macau (H)	2	0

Source: BadmintonCN
(H) Host

==== Second round (knockout stage) ====
Quarter-finals
X1	Chinese Taipei	3
Z2	Hong Kong	1
W1	China	3
Y2	Indonesia	0
Z1	Japan	3
X2	Singapore	0
Y1	Thailand	3
W2	Malaysia	0

Semi-finals
X1	Chinese Taipei	0
W1	China	3
Z1	Japan	3
Y1	Thailand	2

Final
W1	China	2
Z1	Japan	3
Third place
X1	Chinese Taipei	2
Y1	Thailand	3

==== Classification round (additional quota) ====
Qualified for the 2012 Uber Cup

Pos	Team	Pld	Pts
1	Indonesia	3	3
2	Singapore	3	2
3	Hong Kong	3	1
4	Malaysia	3	0

Source: BadmintonCN

=== Badminton Europe ===
The qualification for the European teams was held from 14 to 19 February 2012, at the Sporthallen Zuid in Amsterdam, Netherlands. The semi-finalists of the European qualification will qualify for the Uber Cup.

==== Teams in contention ====
Teams qualified for the Group stage

- Belarus
- Belgium
- Bulgaria
- Croatia
- Cyprus
- Czech Republic
- Denmark
- England
- Estonia
- Finland
- France
- Germany
- Hungary
- Iceland
- Ireland
- Italy
- Lithuania
- Netherlands
- Poland
- Portugal
- Russia
- Scotland
- Slovakia
- Slovenia
- Spain
- Sweden
- Switzerland
- Ukraine
- Wales

==== First round (group stage) ====
Advance to Knockout stage

Group 1
Group 2
Group 3

Pos	Team	Pld	Pts
1	Denmark	2	2
2	Spain	2	1
3	Poland	2	0

Source: BWF

Pos	Team	Pld	Pts
1	Germany	2	2
2	Belarus	2	1
3	Cyprus	2	0

Source: BWF

Pos	Team	Pld	Pts
1	Netherlands (H)	2	2
2	Sweden	2	1
3	Hungary	2	0

Source: BWF
(H) Host
Group 4
Group 5
Group 6

Pos	Team	Pld	Pts
1	Russia	3	3
2	Slovenia	3	2
3	Ireland	3	1
4	Slovakia	3	0

Source: BWF

Pos	Team	Pld	Pts
1	Bulgaria	3	3
2	Finland	3	2
3	Estonia	3	1
4	Portugal	3	0

Source: BWF

Pos	Team	Pld	Pts
1	Switzerland	3	3
2	England	3	2
3	Scotland	3	1
4	Italy	3	0

Source: BWF
Group 7
Group 8

Pos	Team	Pld	Pts
1	France	3	3
2	Belgium	3	2
3	Wales	3	1
4	Iceland	3	0

Source: BWF

Pos	Team	Pld	Pts
1	Ukraine	3	3
2	Czech Republic	3	2
3	Lithuania	3	1
4	Croatia	3	0

Source: BWF

==== Second round (knockout stage) ====
Quarter-finals
17 February 2012
Denmark	3
Ukraine	2
Russia	3
Bulgaria	1
Switzerland	2
Netherlands	3
France	0
Germany	3

Semi-finals
18 February 2012
Denmark	3
Russia	0
Netherlands	1
Germany	3

Final
19 February 2012
Denmark	1
Germany	3
Third place
19 February 2012
Russia	1
Netherlands	3

=== Badminton Oceania ===
The qualification for the Oceanian teams was held from 18 to 19 February 2012, at the Ken Kay Badminton Stadium in Ballarat, Australia. The winner of the Oceania qualification will qualify for the Uber Cup.

==== Teams in contention ====
- Australia
- New Caledonia
- New Zealand

==== Round-robin ====
Pos	Team	Pld	Pts
1	Australia (H)	2	2
2	New Zealand	2	1
3	New Caledonia	2	0

Source: BWF
(H) Host

=== Badminton Pan Am ===
The qualification for the Pan Am teams was held from 17 to 19 February 2012, at the Los Angeles Badminton Club in El Monte, California, United States. The winner of the Pan Am qualification will qualify for the Uber Cup.

==== Teams in contention ====
- Barbados
- Brazil
- Canada
- Puerto Rico
- United States

==== Round-robin ====
Pos	Team	Pld	Pts
1	United States (H)	4	4
2	Canada	4	3
3	Brazil	4	2
4	Barbados	4	1
5	Puerto Rico	4	0

Source: BWF
(H) Host
