= 2012 Badminton Asia Thomas & Uber Cup Preliminaries =

Badminton championships

Tournament details
- Dates: 13–19 February
- Venue: Macao Forum
- Location: Macau

The 2012 Badminton Asia Thomas & Uber Cup Preliminaries were the Asian qualifiers for the 2012 Thomas & Uber Cup. The tournament was held from 13 to 19 February.

== Tournament ==
The 2012 Badminton Asia Thomas & Uber Cup Preliminaries serve as the Asian qualification event towards the 2012 Thomas & Uber Cup in Wuhan, China.

=== Venue ===
The tournament was held at the Macao Forum in Macau.

=== Draw ===
- Men's team

Group A	Group B	Group C	Group D
China; Chinese Taipei; Vietnam	India; Indonesia; Macau; Singapore	Japan; Kazakhstan; Sri Lanka; Thailand	Hong Kong; South Korea; Malaysia

- Women's team

Group W	Group X	Group Y	Group Z
China; India; Malaysia	Singapore; Chinese Taipei; Vietnam	Indonesia; Kazakhstan; Sri Lanka; Thailand	Hong Kong; Japan; Macau

== Men's team ==
All times are Macau Standard Time (UTC+08:00).

=== Group stage ===
==== Group A ====
Pos	Team	Pld	W	L	MF	MA	MD	GF	GA	GD	PF	PA	PD	Pts	Qualification
1	China	2	2	0	9	1	+8	18	2	+16	408	273	+135	2	Knockout stage
2	Chinese Taipei	2	1	1	4	6	−2	8	13	−5	358	366	−8	1	Knockout stage
3	Vietnam	2	0	2	2	8	−6	5	16	−11	277	404	−127	0	

Source: BadmintonCN

China
4
Macao Forum, Court 3
13 February 2012, 13:30 UTC+8

Vietnam
1

			1	2	3
1	(China) (Vietnam)	Chen Long; Nguyễn Tiến Minh	15; 21	12; 21
2	(China) (Vietnam)	Li Gen / Zhang Nan; Dương Bảo Đức / Nguyễn Hoàng Nam	21; 12	21; 18
3	(China) (Vietnam)	Chen Jin; Lê Hà Anh	21; 3	21; 11
4	(China) (Vietnam)	Chai Biao / Guo Zhendong; Bùi Bằng Đức / Đào Mạnh Thắng	21; 9	21; 6
5	(China) (Vietnam)	Wang Zhengming; Nguyễn Hoàng Nam	21; 11	21; 12

Chinese Taipei
4
Macao Forum, Court 3
14 February 2012, 13:30 UTC+8

Vietnam
1

			1	2	3
1	(Chinese Taipei) (Vietnam)	Hsu Jen-hao; Nguyễn Tiến Minh	18; 21	8; 21
2	(Chinese Taipei) (Vietnam)	Hsueh Hsuan-yi; Lê Hà Anh	21; 2	21; 6
3	(Chinese Taipei) (Vietnam)	Lin Yu-hsien; Nguyễn Hoàng Nam	21; 17	15; 21	21; 12
4	(Chinese Taipei) (Vietnam)	Lee Sheng-mu / Fang Chieh-min; Bùi Bằng Đức / Đào Mạnh Thắng	21; 13	21; 13
5	(Chinese Taipei) (Vietnam)	Liao Min-chun / Wu Chun-wei; Dương Bảo Đức / Nguyễn Hoàng Nam	21; 18	21; 9

China
5
Macao Forum, Court 3
15 February 2012, 13:30 UTC+8

Chinese Taipei
0

			1	2	3
1	(China) (Chinese Taipei)	Chen Long; Hsu Jen-hao	21; 9	21; 13
2	(China) (Chinese Taipei)	Liu Xiaolong / Qiu Zihan; Fang Chieh-min / Lee Sheng-mu	21; 19	22; 20
3	(China) (Chinese Taipei)	Du Pengyu; Hsueh Hsuan-yi	22; 20	21; 17
4	(China) (Chinese Taipei)	Chai Biao / Zhang Nan; Liao Min-chun / Wu Chun-wei	22; 20	21; 17
5	(China) (Chinese Taipei)	Wang Zhengming; Chou Tien-chen	21; 11	21; 11

==== Group B ====
Pos	Team	Pld	W	L	MF	MA	MD	GF	GA	GD	PF	PA	PD	Pts	Qualification
1	Indonesia	3	3	0	13	2	+11	27	4	+23	625	384	+241	3	Knockout stage
2	India	3	2	1	10	5	+5	21	11	+10	607	471	+136	2	Knockout stage
3	Singapore	3	1	2	7	8	−1	14	17	−3	523	536	−13	1	
4	Macau (H)	3	0	3	0	15	−15	0	30	−30	266	630	−364	0	

Source: BadmintonCN
(H) Host

Indonesia
5
Macao Forum, Court 3
13 February 2012, 18:30 UTC+8

Macau
0

			1	2	3
1	(Indonesia) (Macau)	Simon Santoso; Leong Kin Fai	21; 5	21; 6
2	(Indonesia) (Macau)	Mohammad Ahsan / Bona Septano; Lam Chi Man / Leong Kin Fai	21; 10	21; 12
3	(Indonesia) (Macau)	Taufik Hidayat; Lo Ion Weng	21; 7	21; 6
4	(Indonesia) (Macau)	Hendra Aprida Gunawan / Alvent Yulianto; Iao Io Keng / Wong Chi Chong	21; 4	21; 7
5	(Indonesia) (Macau)	Dionysius Hayom Rumbaka; Ng Chi Chong	21; 7	21; 9

India
3
Macao Forum, Court 4
13 February 2012, 18:30 UTC+8

Singapore
2

			1	2	3
1	(India) (Singapore)	Parupalli Kashyap; Derek Wong	21; 16	21; 19
2	(India) (Singapore)	Rupesh Kumar / Sanave Thomas; Liu Yi / Jonathan Tang	21; 8	21; 15
3	(India) (Singapore)	Sourabh Verma; Ashton Chen	20; 22	16; 21
4	(India) (Singapore)	Pranav Chopra / Akshay Dewalkar; Chayut Triyachart / Jeffrey Wong	21; 19	21; 16
5	(India) (Singapore)	Anand Pawar; Huang Chao	14; 21	21; 6	18; 21

Indonesia
5
Macao Forum, Court 3
14 February 2012, 18:30 UTC+8

Singapore
0

			1	2	3
1	(Indonesia) (Singapore)	Simon Santoso; Derek Wong Zi Liang	21; 9	21; 12
2	(Indonesia) (Singapore)	Mohammad Ahsan / Bona Septano; Liu Yi / Jonathan Tang	21; 14	21; 16
3	(Indonesia) (Singapore)	Taufik Hidayat; Ashton Chen	21; 16	21; 12
4	(Indonesia) (Singapore)	Markis Kido / Hendra Setiawan; Jeffrey Wong / Terry Yeo	21; 14	21; 14
5	(Indonesia) (Singapore)	Tommy Sugiarto; Huang Chao	21; 14	21; 8

India
5
Macao Forum, Court 4
14 February 2012, 18:30 UTC+8

Macau
0

			1	2	3
1	(India) (Macau)	Ajay Jayaram; Lam Chi Man	21; 9	21; 11
2	(India) (Macau)	Valiyaveetil Diju / Sanave Thomas; Iao Io Keng / Lo Ion Weng	21; 6	21; 2
3	(India) (Macau)	Parupalli Kashyap; Ng Chi Chong	21; 10	21; 7
4	(India) (Macau)	Pranav Chopra / Akshay Dewalkar; Lam Chi Man / Leong Kin Fai	21; 11	21; 13
5	(India) (Macau)	B. Sai Praneeth; Lo Ion Weng	21; 5	21; 8

Singapore
5
Macao Forum, Court 1
15 February 2012, 09:00 UTC+8

Macau
0

			1	2	3
1	(Singapore) (Macau)	Derek Wong; Leong Kin Fai	21; 10	21; 9
2	(Singapore) (Macau)	Huang Chao; Lam Chi Man	21; 11	21; 12
3	(Singapore) (Macau)	Jonathan Tang / Jeffrey Wong; Iao Io Keng / Lo Ion Weng	21; 8	21; 13
4	(Singapore) (Macau)	Gerald Ong; Ng Chi Chong	21; 12	21; 6
5	(Singapore) (Macau)	Terry Yeo / Liu Yi; Lam Chi Man / Leong Kin Fai	21; 11	21; 19

Indonesia
3
Macao Forum, Court 3
15 February 2012, 13:30 UTC+8

India
2

			1	2	3
1	(Indonesia) (India)	Simon Santoso; Parupalli Kashyap	21; 7	21; 15
2	(Indonesia) (India)	Hendra Aprida Gunawan / Alvent Yulianto; Rupesh Kumar / Sanave Thomas	18; 21	16; 21
3	(Indonesia) (India)	Taufik Hidayat; Anand Pawar	21; 16	21; 13
4	(Indonesia) (India)	Markis Kido / Hendra Setiawan; Pranav Chopra / Akshay Dewalkar	21; 18	21; 16
5	(Indonesia) (India)	Dionysius Hayom Rumbaka; B. Sai Praneeth	21; 13	15; 21	9; 21

==== Group C ====
Pos	Team	Pld	W	L	MF	MA	MD	GF	GA	GD	PF	PA	PD	Pts	Qualification
1	Japan	3	3	0	14	1	+13	28	3	+25	645	364	+281	3	Knockout stage
2	Thailand	3	2	1	11	4	+7	23	9	+14	615	465	+150	2	Knockout stage
3	Sri Lanka	3	1	2	5	10	−5	11	20	−9	462	552	−90	1	
4	Kazakhstan	3	0	3	0	15	−15	0	30	−30	289	630	−341	0	

Source: BadmintonCN

Japan
5
Macao Forum, Court 1
13 February 2012, 13:30 UTC+8

Kazakhstan
0

			1	2	3
1	(Japan) (Kazakhstan)	Kenichi Tago; Artur Niyazov	21; 13	21; 7
2	(Japan) (Kazakhstan)	Kazushi Yamada; Samat Yerzhakanov	21; 10	21; 9
3	(Japan) (Kazakhstan)	Takuma Ueda; Anton Klyam	21; 3	21; 8
4	(Japan) (Kazakhstan)	Naoki Kawamae / Shōji Satō; Artur Niyazov / Askar Ormanov	21; 11	21; 6
5	(Japan) (Kazakhstan)	Hiroyuki Endo / Kenichi Hayakawa; Anton Klyam / Samat Yerzhakanov	21; 5	21; 8

Thailand
5
Macao Forum, Court 2
13 February 2012, 13:30 UTC+8

Sri Lanka
0

			1	2	3
1	(Thailand) (Sri Lanka)	Boonsak Ponsana; Niluka Karunaratne	21; 18	8; 21	22; 20
2	(Thailand) (Sri Lanka)	Tanongsak Saensomboonsuk; Lasitha Menaka	21; 7	21; 15
3	(Thailand) (Sri Lanka)	Suppanyu Avihingsanon; Rajitha Sandeepana Dhanayaka	21; 9	21; 14
4	(Thailand) (Sri Lanka)	Songphon Anugritayawon / Sudket Prapakamol; Sankalpa Gunawardena / Lasitha Menaka	21; 11	21; 17
5	(Thailand) (Sri Lanka)	Bodin Isara / Maneepong Jongjit; Hasitha Chanaka / Rajitha Sandeepana Dhanayaka	21; 6	21; 16

Japan
5
Macao Forum, Court 1
14 February 2012, 13:30 UTC+8

Sri Lanka
0

			1	2	3
1	(Japan) (Sri Lanka)	Sho Sasaki; Niluka Karunaratne	21; 18	21; 8
2	(Japan) (Sri Lanka)	Kenichi Tago; Lasitha Menaka	21; 8	21; 9
3	(Japan) (Sri Lanka)	Takuma Ueda; Hasitha Chanaka	21; 6	21; 13
4	(Japan) (Sri Lanka)	Naoki Kawamae / Shōji Satō; Amila Chamin Fernando / Lasitha Menaka	21; 11	21; 15
5	(Japan) (Sri Lanka)	Hirokatsu Hashimoto / Noriyasu Hirata; Hasitha Chanaka / Rajitha Sandeepana Dhanayaka	21; 6	21; 4

Thailand
5
Macao Forum, Court 2
14 February 2012, 13:30 UTC+8

Kazakhstan
0

			1	2	3
1	(Thailand) (Kazakhstan)	Boonsak Ponsana; Artur Niyazov	21; 10	21; 7
2	(Thailand) (Kazakhstan)	Tanongsak Saensomboonsuk; Samat Yerzhakanov	21; 12	21; 15
3	(Thailand) (Kazakhstan)	Pakkawat Vilailak; Anton Klyam	21; 7	21; 5
4	(Thailand) (Kazakhstan)	Bodin Isara / Maneepong Jongjit; Artur Niyazov / Askar Ormanov	21; 10	21; 9
5	(Thailand) (Kazakhstan)	Patiphat Chalardchaleam / Nipitphon Phuangphuapet; Anton Klyam / Samat Yerzhakanov	21; 3	21; 8

Sri Lanka
5
Macao Forum, Court 3
15 February 2012, 09:00 UTC+8

Kazakhstan
0

			1	2	3
1	(Sri Lanka) (Kazakhstan)	Niluka Karunaratne; Artur Niyazov	21; 13	21; 6
2	(Sri Lanka) (Kazakhstan)	Lasitha Menaka; Samat Yerzhakanov	21; 19	21; 17
3	(Sri Lanka) (Kazakhstan)	Rajitha Sandeepana Dhanayaka; Anton Klyam	21; 13	21; 11
4	(Sri Lanka) (Kazakhstan)	Hasitha Chanaka / Rajitha Sandeepana Dhanayaka; Artur Niyazov / Askar Ormanov	21; 15	21; 5
5	(Sri Lanka) (Kazakhstan)	Sankalpa Gunawardena / Lasitha Menaka; Anton Klyam / Samat Yerzhakanov	21; 10	21; 14

Japan
4
Macao Forum, Court 1
15 February 2012, 13:30 UTC+8

Thailand
1

			1	2	3
1	(Japan) (Thailand)	Sho Sasaki; Boonsak Ponsana	21; 16	21; 8
2	(Japan) (Thailand)	Hirokatsu Hashimoto / Noriyasu Hirata; Bodin Isara / Maneepong Jongjit	19; 21	19; 21
3	(Japan) (Thailand)	Kenichi Tago; Tanongsak Saensomboonsuk	21; 19	21; 12
4	(Japan) (Thailand)	Hiroyuki Endo / Kenichi Hayakawa; Songphon Anugritayawon / Sudket Prapakamol	19; 21	21; 16	21; 18
5	(Japan) (Thailand)	Takuma Ueda; Suppanyu Avihingsanon	21; 18	21; 16

==== Group D ====
Pos	Team	Pld	W	L	MF	MA	MD	GF	GA	GD	PF	PA	PD	Pts	Qualification
1	Malaysia	2	2	0	6	4	+2	13	9	+4	435	392	+43	2	Knockout stage
2	South Korea	2	1	1	7	3	+4	15	8	+7	444	416	+28	1	Knockout stage
3	Hong Kong	2	0	2	2	8	−6	6	17	−11	395	466	−71	0	

Source: BadmintonCN

South Korea
5
Macao Forum, Court 3
13 February 2012, 09:00 UTC+8

Hong Kong
0

			1	2	3
1	(South Korea) (Hong Kong)	Lee Hyun-il; Wong Wing Ki	23; 21	22; 20
2	(South Korea) (Hong Kong)	Yoo Yeon-seong / Ko Sung-hyun; Chan Tsz Kit / Lo Lok Kei	21; 11	21; 14
3	(South Korea) (Hong Kong)	Son Wan-ho; Chan Yan Kit	18; 21	21; 11	21; 18
4	(South Korea) (Hong Kong)	Lee Yong-dae / Shin Baek-cheol; Lee Chun Hei / Wong Wai Hong	21; 18	21; 11
5	(South Korea) (Hong Kong)	Hong Ji-hoon; Wei Nan	21; 14	11; 21	24; 22

Malaysia
3
Macao Forum, Court 3
14 February 2012, 09:00 UTC+8

Hong Kong
2

			1	2	3
1	(Malaysia) (Hong Kong)	Lee Chong Wei; Wong Wing Ki	21; 18	22; 20
2	(Malaysia) (Hong Kong)	Koo Kien Keat / Tan Boon Heong; Leung Chun Yiu / Lo Lok Kei	21; 9	21; 14
3	(Malaysia) (Hong Kong)	Muhammad Hafiz Hashim; Hu Yun	20; 22	18; 21
4	(Malaysia) (Hong Kong)	Goh V Shem / Lim Khim Wah; Lee Chun Hei / Wong Wai Hong	21; 14	21; 16
5	(Malaysia) (Hong Kong)	Liew Daren; Chan Yan Kit	21; 17	16; 21	19; 21

South Korea
2
Macao Forum, Court 4
15 February 2012, 18:30 UTC+8

Malaysia
3

			1	2	3
1	(South Korea) (Malaysia)	Lee Hyun-il; Lee Chong Wei	13; 21	15; 21
2	(South Korea) (Malaysia)	Ko Sung-hyun / Yoo Yeon-seong; Koo Kien Keat / Tan Boon Heong	14; 21	19; 21
3	(South Korea) (Malaysia)	Son Wan-ho; Muhammad Hafiz Hashim	24; 22	21; 16
4	(South Korea) (Malaysia)	Lee Yong-dae / Shin Baek-cheol; Lim Khim Wah / Goh V Shem	21; 18	19; 21	11; 21
5	(South Korea) (Malaysia)	Hong Ji-hoon; Mohamad Arif Abdul Latif	21; 17	21; 15

=== Knockout stage ===
==== Bracket ====
Quarter-finals
A1	China	3
C2	Thailand	0
B1	Indonesia	3
D2	South Korea	2
C1	Japan	3
A2	Chinese Taipei	2
B2	India	0
D1	Malaysia	3

Semi-finals
A1	China	3
B1	Indonesia	0
C1	Japan	3
D1	Malaysia	0

Final
A1	China	3
C1	Japan	0
Third place
B1	Indonesia	3
D1	Malaysia	2

==== Quarter-finals ====
China
3
Macao Forum, Court 2
16 February 2012, 13:30 UTC+8

Thailand
0

			1	2	3
1	(China) (Thailand)	Chen Long; Tanongsak Saensomboonsuk	21; 11	21; 9
2	(China) (Thailand)	Chai Biao / Guo Zhendong; Bodin Isara / Maneepong Jongjit	21; 17	21; 6
3	(China) (Thailand)	Du Pengyu; Suppanyu Avihingsanon	21; 18	21; 9
4	(China) (Thailand)	Liu Xiaolong / Qiu Zihan; Songphon Anugritayawon / Sudket Prapakamol				not played
5	(China) (Thailand)	Wang Zhengming; Pakkawat Vilailak				not played

Japan
3
Macao Forum, Court 4
16 February 2012, 13:30 UTC+8

Chinese Taipei
0

			1	2	3
1	(Japan) (Chinese Taipei)	Sho Sasaki; Hsu Jen-hao	21; 5	21; 10
2	(Japan) (Chinese Taipei)	Noriyasu Hirata / Hirokatsu Hashimoto; Fang Chieh-min / Lee Sheng-mu	21; 13	21; 18
3	(Japan) (Chinese Taipei)	Kenichi Tago; Hsueh Hsuan-yi	19; 21	26; 24	21; 11
4	(Japan) (Chinese Taipei)	Naoki Kawamae / Shōji Satō; Liao Min-chun / Wu Chun-wei				not played
5	(Japan) (Chinese Taipei)	Takuma Ueda; Chou Tien-chen				not played

Indonesia
3
Macao Forum, Court 2
16 February 2012, 18:30 UTC+8

South Korea
2

			1	2	3
1	(Indonesia) (South Korea)	Simon Santoso; Lee Hyun-il	21; 14	15; 21	16; 21
2	(Indonesia) (South Korea)	Mohammad Ahsan / Bona Septano; Ko Sung-hyun / Yoo Yeon-seong	21; 18	20; 22	19; 21
3	(Indonesia) (South Korea)	Taufik Hidayat; Son Wan-ho	21; 11	21; 15
4	(Indonesia) (South Korea)	Markis Kido / Hendra Setiawan; Lee Yong-dae / Shin Baek-cheol	19; 21	21; 17	21; 17
5	(Indonesia) (South Korea)	Tommy Sugiarto; Hong Ji-hoon	21; 7	16; 21	21; 8

Malaysia
3
Macao Forum, Court 4
16 February 2012, 18:30 UTC+8

India
0

			1	2	3
1	(Malaysia) (India)	Lee Chong Wei; Ajay Jayaram	21; 12	17; 21	21; 8
2	(Malaysia) (India)	Koo Kien Keat / Tan Boon Heong; Sanave Thomas / Rupesh Kumar	21; 14	23; 21
3	(Malaysia) (India)	Muhammad Hafiz Hashim; Kashyap Parupalli	21; 17	18; 21	21; 11
4	(Malaysia) (India)	Goh V Shem / Lim Khim Wah; Pranav Chopra / Akshay Dewalkar				not played
5	(Malaysia) (India)	Liew Daren; B. Sai Praneeth				not played

==== Semi-finals ====
China
3
Macao Forum, Court 2
17 February 2012, 18:30 UTC+8

Indonesia
0

			1	2	3
1	(China) (Indonesia)	Chen Long; Taufik Hidayat	21; 13	21; 8
2	(China) (Indonesia)	Chai Biao / Guo Zhendong; Bona Septano / Mohammad Ahsan	21; 17	21; 12
3	(China) (Indonesia)	Chen Jin; Tommy Sugiarto	21; 14	21; 8
4	(China) (Indonesia)	Liu Xiaolong / Qiu Zihan; Hendra Setiawan / Alvent Yulianto				not played
5	(China) (Indonesia)	Du Pengyu; Dionysius Hayom Rumbaka				not played

Japan
3
Macao Forum, Court 3
17 February 2012, 18:30 UTC+8

Malaysia
0

			1	2	3
1	(Japan) (Malaysia)	Sho Sasaki; Muhammad Hafiz Hashim	21; 19	21; 16
2	(Japan) (Malaysia)	Noriyasu Hirata / Hirokatsu Hashimoto; Goh V Shem / Lim Khim Wah	21; 11	11; 21	21; 18
3	(Japan) (Malaysia)	Kenichi Tago; Liew Daren	30; 28	21; 19
4	(Japan) (Malaysia)	Naoki Kawamae / Shōji Satō; Hoon Thien How / Tan Boon Heong				not played
5	(Japan) (Malaysia)	Takuma Ueda; Mohamad Arif Abdul Latif				not played

==== Third place ====
Indonesia
3
Macao Forum, Court 3
18 February 2012, 13:30 UTC+8

Malaysia
2

			1	2	3
1	(Indonesia) (Malaysia)	Simon Santoso; Liew Daren	2; 7			retired
2	(Indonesia) (Malaysia)	Alvent Yulianto / Hendra Gunawan; Goh V Shem / Hoon Thien How	14; 21	18; 21
3	(Indonesia) (Malaysia)	Tommy Sugiarto; Arif Abdul Latif	21; 15	21; 7
4	(Indonesia) (Malaysia)	Markis Kido / Hendra Setiawan; Lim Khim Wah / Teo Kok Siang	21; 16	21; 13
5	(Indonesia) (Malaysia)	Dionysius Hayom Rumbaka; Koo Kien Keat	21; 8	21; 9

==== Final ====
China
3
Macao Forum, Court 3
19 February 2012, 13:30 UTC+8

Japan
0

			1	2	3
1	(China) (Japan)	Chen Long; Sho Sasaki	21; 19	21; 16
2	(China) (Japan)	Chai Biao / Guo Zhendong; Shoji Sato / Naoki Kawamae	21; 17	22; 20
3	(China) (Japan)	Du Pengyu; Kazushi Yamada	21; 12	21; 11
4	(China) (Japan)	Liu Xiaolong / Qiu Zihan; Kenichi Hayakawa / Hiroyuki Endo				not played
5	(China) (Japan)	Wang Zhengming; Takuma Ueda				not played

=== Classification round ===
Pos	Team	Pld	W	L	MF	MA	MD	GF	GA	GD	PF	PA	PD	Pts	Qualification
1	South Korea	3	3	0	10	5	+5	22	9	+13	603	498	+105	3	2012 Thomas Cup
2	Chinese Taipei	3	1	2	9	6	+3	18	16	+2	625	602	+23	1	
3	India	3	1	2	7	8	−1	16	18	−2	622	641	−19	1	
4	Thailand	3	1	2	4	11	−7	12	25	−13	607	716	−109	1	

Source: BadmintonCN

Thailand
3
Macao Forum, Court 3
17 February 2012, 09:00 UTC+8

India
2

			1	2	3
1	(Thailand) (India)	Boonsak Ponsana; Parupalli Kashyap	22; 20	8; 21	21; 19
2	(Thailand) (India)	Songphon Anugritayawon / Sudket Prapakamol; Rupesh Kumar / Sanave Thomas	16; 21	21; 18	21; 17
3	(Thailand) (India)	Suppanyu Avihingsanon; Sourabh Varma	19; 21	17; 21
4	(Thailand) (India)	Patiphat Chalardchaleam / Nipitphon Phuangphuapet; Pranav Chopra / Akshay Dewalkar	21; 17	22; 20
5	(Thailand) (India)	Pakkawat Vilailak; B. Sai Praneeth	15; 21	21; 14	7; 21

South Korea
3
Macao Forum, Court 4
17 February 2012, 09:00 UTC+8

Chinese Taipei
2

			1	2	3
1	(South Korea) (Chinese Taipei)	Lee Hyun-il; Hsu Jen-hao	24; 22	20; 22	21; 16
2	(South Korea) (Chinese Taipei)	Ko Sung-hyun / Yoo Yeon-seong; Liao Min-chun / Wu Chun-wei	21; 14	21; 18
3	(South Korea) (Chinese Taipei)	Son Wan-ho; Hsueh Hsuan-yi	21; 8	21; 12
4	(South Korea) (Chinese Taipei)	Lee Yong-dae / Shin Baek-cheol; Lee Sheng-mu / Lin Yu-lang	12; 11			retired
5	(South Korea) (Chinese Taipei)	Park Sung-min; Chou Tien-chen	10; 21	17; 21

South Korea
4
Macao Forum, Court 3
18 February 2012, 09:00 UTC+8

Thailand
1

			1	2	3
1	(South Korea) (Thailand)	Lee Hyun-il; Tanongsak Saensomboonsuk	21; 16	21; 12
2	(South Korea) (Thailand)	Son Wan-ho; Suppanyu Avihingsanon	21; 18	21; 8
3	(South Korea) (Thailand)	Hong Ji-hoon; Pakkawat Vilailak	21; 19	22; 20
4	(South Korea) (Thailand)	Ko Sung-hyun / Yoo Yeon-seong; Bodin Isara / Maneepong Jongjit	14; 21	21; 10	16; 21
5	(South Korea) (Thailand)	Hong Ji-hoon / Lee Yong-dae; Patiphat Chalardchaleam / Nipitphon Phuangphuapet	15; 21	21; 16	21; 17

Chinese Taipei
2
Macao Forum, Court 4
18 February 2012, 09:00 UTC+8

India
3

			1	2	3
1	(Chinese Taipei) (India)	Hsu Jen-hao; Ajay Jayaram	14; 21	21; 19	21; 12
2	(Chinese Taipei) (India)	Fang Chieh-min / Lee Sheng-mu; Rupesh Kumar / Sanave Thomas	21; 18	21; 17
3	(Chinese Taipei) (India)	Chou Tien-chen; Sourabh Varma	20; 22	22; 20	18; 21
4	(Chinese Taipei) (India)	Liao Min-chun / Wu Chun-wei; Pranav Chopra / Akshay Dewalkar	18; 21	22; 24
5	(Chinese Taipei) (India)	Lin Yu-hsien; Anand Pawar	13; 21	19; 21

Chinese Taipei
5
Macao Forum, Court 2
19 February 2012, 09:00 UTC+8

Thailand
0

			1	2	3
1	(Chinese Taipei) (Thailand)	Hsu Jen-hao; Boonsak Ponsana	21; 17	18; 21	21; 13
2	(Chinese Taipei) (Thailand)	Fang Chieh-min / Lee Sheng-mu; Songphon Anugritayawon / Sudket Prapakamol	21; 9	21; 10
3	(Chinese Taipei) (Thailand)	Hsueh Hsuan-yi; Tanongsak Saensomboonsuk	21; 14	21; 19
4	(Chinese Taipei) (Thailand)	Liao Min-chun / Wu Chun-wei; Patiphat Chalardchaleam / Nipitphon Phuangphuapet	21; 18	17; 21	21; 15
5	(Chinese Taipei) (Thailand)	Chou Tien-chen; Pakkawat Vilailak	21; 19	6; 1		retired

South Korea
3
Macao Forum, Court 4
19 February 2012, 09:00 UTC+8

India
2

			1	2	3
1	(South Korea) (India)	Lee Hyun-il; Parupalli Kashyap	18; 21	17; 21
2	(South Korea) (India)	Ko Sung-hyun / Lee Yong-dae; Pranav Chopra / Akshay Dewalkar	21; 12	21; 10
3	(South Korea) (India)	Son Wan-ho; Sourabh Varma	21; 8	19; 21	21; 19
4	(South Korea) (India)	Shin Baek-cheol / Yoo Yeon-seong; Valiyaveetil Diju / Sanave Thomas	21; 11	21; 11
5	(South Korea) (India)	Hong Ji-hoon; B. Sai Praneeth				w/o

=== Qualified teams ===
- China (16th appearance)
- South Korea (15th appearance)
- Japan (11th appearance)
- Indonesia (24th appearance)
- Malaysia (24th appearance)

== Women's team ==
All times are Macau Standard Time (UTC+08:00).

=== Group stage ===
==== Group W ====
Pos	Team	Pld	W	L	MF	MA	MD	GF	GA	GD	PF	PA	PD	Pts	Qualification
1	China	2	2	0	9	1	+8	18	2	+16	409	278	+131	2	Knockout stage
2	Malaysia	2	1	1	4	6	−2	10	10	0	354	339	+15	1	Knockout stage
3	India	2	0	2	2	8	−6	2	18	−16	263	409	−146	0	

Source: BadmintonCN

China
4
Macao Forum, Court 2
13 February 2012, 18:30 UTC+8

Malaysia
1

			1	2	3
1	(China) (Malaysia)	Jiang Yanjiao; Tee Jing Yi	21; 11	21; 7
2	(China) (Malaysia)	Tian Qing / Zhao Yunlei; Chin Eei Hui / Wong Pei Tty	21; 10	21; 9
3	(China) (Malaysia)	Liu Xin; Lyddia Cheah	21; 12	21; 19
4	(China) (Malaysia)	Bao Yixin / Zhong Qianxin; Goh Liu Ying / Lim Yin Loo	16; 21	15; 21
5	(China) (Malaysia)	Wang Lin; Sannatasah Saniru	21; 11	21; 13

India
2
Macao Forum, Court 2
14 February 2012, 18:30 UTC+8

Malaysia
3

			1	2	3
1	(India) (Malaysia)	Saina Nehwal; Tee Jing Yi	21; 17	21; 16
2	(India) (Malaysia)	Jwala Gutta / Ashwini Ponnappa; Chin Eei Hui / Wong Pei Tty	12; 21	16; 21
3	(India) (Malaysia)	P. V. Sindhu; Lyddia Cheah	16; 21	21; 13	21; 9
4	(India) (Malaysia)	Pradnya Gadre / Prajakta Sawant; Goh Liu Ying / Vivian Hoo	17; 21	17; 21
5	(India) (Malaysia)	Sayali Gokhale; Yang Li Lian	21; 11	15; 21	20; 22

China
5
Macao Forum, Court 2
15 February 2012, 18:30 UTC+8

India
0

			1	2	3
1	(China) (India)	Jiang Yanjiao; Saina Nehwal	21; 19	21; 19
2	(China) (India)	Tian Qing / Zhao Yunlei; Jwala Gutta / Ashwini Ponnappa	21; 19	21; 10
3	(China) (India)	Li Xuerui; P. V. Sindhu	21; 16	21; 13
4	(China) (India)	Cheng Shu / Pan Pan; Pradnya Gadre / Prajakta Sawant	21; 18	21; 19
5	(China) (India)	Liu Xin; Sayali Gokhale	21; 9	21; 2

==== Group X ====
Pos	Team	Pld	W	L	MF	MA	MD	GF	GA	GD	PF	PA	PD	Pts	Qualification
1	Chinese Taipei	2	2	0	9	1	+8	18	2	+16	408	310	+98	2	Knockout stage
2	Singapore	2	1	1	6	4	+2	12	8	+4	377	311	+66	1	Knockout stage
3	Vietnam	2	0	2	0	10	−10	0	20	−20	256	420	−164	0	

Source: BadmintonCN

Chinese Taipei
5
Macao Forum, Court 1
13 February 2012, 18:30 UTC+8

Vietnam
0

			1	2	3
1	(Chinese Taipei) (Vietnam)	Tai Tzu-ying; Vũ Thị Trang	21; 14	21; 16
2	(Chinese Taipei) (Vietnam)	Pai Hsiao-ma; Lê Thu Huyền	21; 10	21; 13
3	(Chinese Taipei) (Vietnam)	Hsieh Pei-chen / Wang Pei-rong; Nguyễn Thị Sen / Vũ Thị Trang	21; 17	21; 17
4	(Chinese Taipei) (Vietnam)	Hung Shih-chieh; Nguyễn Thị Mai Anh	21; 16	21; 12
5	(Chinese Taipei) (Vietnam)	Chiang Kai-hsin / Tsai Pei-ling; Lê Thu Huyền / Phạm Như Thảo	21; 12	21; 16

Singapore
5
Macao Forum, Court 1
14 February 2012, 18:30 UTC+8

Vietnam
0

			1	2	3
1	(Singapore) (Vietnam)	Gu Juan; Vũ Thị Trang	21; 18	21; 9
2	(Singapore) (Vietnam)	Fu Mingtian; Lê Thu Huyền	21; 13	21; 11
3	(Singapore) (Vietnam)	Shinta Mulia Sari / Yao Lei; Nguyễn Thị Sen / Vũ Thị Trang	21; 19	21; 15
4	(Singapore) (Vietnam)	Xing Aiying; Nguyễn Thị Mai Anh	21; 4	21; 4
5	(Singapore) (Vietnam)	Chen Jiayuan / Thng Ting Ting; Lê Thu Huyền / Phạm Như Thảo	21; 11	21; 9

Chinese Taipei
4
Macao Forum, Court 1
15 February 2012, 18:30 UTC+8

Singapore
1

			1	2	3
1	(Chinese Taipei) (Singapore)	Cheng Shao-chieh; Gu Juan	21; 17	21; 14
2	(Chinese Taipei) (Singapore)	Cheng Wen-hsing / Chien Yu-chin; Shinta Mulia Sari / Yao Lei	16; 21	12; 21
3	(Chinese Taipei) (Singapore)	Tai Tzu-ying; Fu Mingtian	21; 11	21; 14
4	(Chinese Taipei) (Singapore)	Hsieh Pei-chen / Wang Pei-rong; Chen Jiayuan / Thng Ting Ting	21; 10	23; 21
5	(Chinese Taipei) (Singapore)	Pai Hsiao-ma; Xing Aiying	21; 19	21; 19

==== Group Y ====
Pos	Team	Pld	W	L	MF	MA	MD	GF	GA	GD	PF	PA	PD	Pts	Qualification
1	Thailand	3	3	0	13	2	+11	26	5	+21	610	319	+291	3	Knockout stage
2	Indonesia	3	2	1	12	3	+9	25	6	+19	606	374	+232	2	Knockout stage
3	Sri Lanka	3	1	2	5	10	−5	10	20	−10	394	565	−171	1	
4	Kazakhstan	3	0	3	0	15	−15	0	30	−30	280	632	−352	0	

Source: BadmintonCN

Thailand
5
Macao Forum, Court 1
13 February 2012, 09:00 UTC+8

Kazakhstan
0

			1	2	3
1	(Thailand) (Kazakhstan)	Ratchanok Intanon; Veronika Sorokina	21; 7	21; 6
2	(Thailand) (Kazakhstan)	Porntip Buranaprasertsuk; Elizaveta Yakovleva	21; 5	21; 3
3	(Thailand) (Kazakhstan)	Sapsiree Taerattanachai; Ilyana Filipchuk	21; 4	21; 6
4	(Thailand) (Kazakhstan)	Duanganong Aroonkesorn / Kunchala Voravichitchaikul; Veronika Sorokina / Karina Suleyeva	21; 7	21; 10
5	(Thailand) (Kazakhstan)	Savitree Amitrapai / Saralee Thungthongkam; Ilyana Filipchuk / Elizaveta Yakovleva	21; 9	21; 5

Indonesia
5
Macao Forum, Court 2
13 February 2012, 09:00 UTC+8

Sri Lanka
0

			1	2	3
1	(Indonesia) (Sri Lanka)	Maria Febe Kusumastuti; Renu Chandrika Hettiarachchige	21; 14	21; 8
2	(Indonesia) (Sri Lanka)	Lindaweni Fanetri; Thilini Hendahewa	21; 9	21; 8
3	(Indonesia) (Sri Lanka)	Meiliana Jauhari / Greysia Polii; Nadeesha Gayanthi / Renu Chandrika Hettiarachchige	21; 16	21; 8
4	(Indonesia) (Sri Lanka)	Bellaetrix Manuputty; Lekha Shehani	21; 17	21; 11
5	(Indonesia) (Sri Lanka)	Anneke Feinya Agustin / Nitya Krishinda Maheswari; Thilini Hendahewa / Kavidi Sirimannage	21; 9	21; 11

Thailand
5
Macao Forum, Court 1
14 February 2012, 09:00 UTC+8

Sri Lanka
0

			1	2	3
1	(Thailand) (Sri Lanka)	Ratchanok Intanon; Thilini Jayasinghe	21; 9	21; 5
2	(Thailand) (Sri Lanka)	Porntip Buranaprasertsuk; Renu Chandrika Hettiarachchige	21; 12	21; 11
3	(Thailand) (Sri Lanka)	Nitchaon Jindapol; Thilini Hendahewa	21; 7	21; 4
4	(Thailand) (Sri Lanka)	Duanganong Aroonkesorn / Kunchala Voravichitchaikul; Renu Chandrika Hettiarachchige / Lekha Shehani	21; 4	21; 10
5	(Thailand) (Sri Lanka)	Saralee Thungthongkam / Savitree Amitrapai; Thilini Hendahewa / Kavidi Sirimannage	21; 5	21; 4

Indonesia
5
Macao Forum, Court 2
14 February 2012, 09:00 UTC+8

Kazakhstan
0

			1	2	3
1	(Indonesia) (Kazakhstan)	Adriyanti Firdasari; Veronika Sorokina	21; 9	21; 11
2	(Indonesia) (Kazakhstan)	Lindaweni Fanetri; Karina Suleyeva	21; 4	21; 10
3	(Indonesia) (Kazakhstan)	Bellaetrix Manuputty; Ilyana Filipchuk	21; 7	21; 4
4	(Indonesia) (Kazakhstan)	Meiliana Jauhari / Greysia Polii; Veronika Sorokina / Karina Suleyeva	21; 7	21; 12
5	(Indonesia) (Kazakhstan)	Anneke Feinya Agustin / Nitya Krishinda Maheswari; Ilyana Filipchuk / Elizaveta Yakovleva	21; 4	21; 5

Sri Lanka
5
Macao Forum, Court 2
15 February 2012, 09:00 UTC+8

Kazakhstan
0

			1	2	3
1	(Sri Lanka) (Kazakhstan)	Renu Chandrika Hettiarachchige; Veronika Sorokina	21; 14	21; 17
2	(Sri Lanka) (Kazakhstan)	Thilini Pramodika; Karina Suleyeva	21; 9	21; 13
3	(Sri Lanka) (Kazakhstan)	Lekha Shehani; Elizaveta Yakovleva	21; 11	22; 20
4	(Sri Lanka) (Kazakhstan)	Renu Chandrika Hettiarachchige / Nadeesha Gayanthi; Veronika Sorokina / Karina Suleyeva	21; 18	21; 13
5	(Sri Lanka) (Kazakhstan)	Thilini Pramodika / Kavindi Ishandika Sirimannage; Elizaveta Yakovleva / Ilyana Filipchuk	21; 10	22; 20

Thailand
3
Macao Forum, Court 1
15 February 2012, 18:30 UTC+8

Indonesia
2

			1	2	3
1	(Thailand) (Indonesia)	Ratchanok Intanon; Adriyanti Firdasari	16; 21	21; 23
2	(Thailand) (Indonesia)	Porntip Buranaprasertsuk; Lindaweni Fanetri	21; 18	10; 21	21; 18
3	(Thailand) (Indonesia)	Sapsiree Taerattanachai; Bellaetrix Manuputty	21; 12	14; 21	21; 11
4	(Thailand) (Indonesia)	Duanganong Aroonkesorn / Kunchala Voravichitchaikul; Liliyana Natsir / Meiliana Jauhari	21; 18	21; 19
5	(Thailand) (Indonesia)	Saralee Thungthongkam / Savitree Amitrapai; Nitya Krishinda Maheswari / Anneke Feinya Agustin	3; 4			retired

==== Group Z ====
Pos	Team	Pld	W	L	MF	MA	MD	GF	GA	GD	PF	PA	PD	Pts	Qualification
1	Japan	2	2	0	9	1	+8	18	2	+16	417	226	+191	2	Knockout stage
2	Hong Kong	2	1	1	5	5	0	10	10	0	371	344	+27	1	Knockout stage
3	Macau (H)	2	0	2	1	9	−8	2	18	−16	185	403	−218	0	

Source: BadmintonCN
(H) Host

Japan
5
Macao Forum, Court 1
13 February 2012, 13:30 UTC+8

Macau
0

			1	2	3
1	(Japan) (Macau)	Sayaka Sato; Iao Mei Ha	21; 3	21; 2
2	(Japan) (Macau)	Mizuki Fujii / Reika Kakiiwa; Wang Rong / Zhang Zhibo	21; 5	21; 15
3	(Japan) (Macau)	Eriko Hirose; Ieong Pek San	21; 1	21; 5
4	(Japan) (Macau)	Shizuka Matsuo / Mami Naito; Iao Mei Ha / Long Ying	21; 6	21; 6
5	(Japan) (Macau)	Ai Goto; Albertina Eugenia de Assis	21; 1	21; 4

Hong Kong
4
Macao Forum, Court 4
14 February 2012, 13:30 UTC+8

Macau
1

			1	2	3
1	(Hong Kong) (Macau)	Yip Pui Yin; Wang Rong	12; 21	13; 21
2	(Hong Kong) (Macau)	Chan Tsz Ka; Iao Mei Ha	21; 7	21; 7
3	(Hong Kong) (Macau)	Poon Lok Yan; Long Ying	21; 12	21; 14
4	(Hong Kong) (Macau)	Poon Lok Yan / Tse Ying Suet; Wang Rong / Zhang Zhibo	21; 19	21; 14
5	(Hong Kong) (Macau)	Chan Hung Yung / Chau Hoi Wah; Iao Mei Ha / Long Ying	21; 9	21; 13

Japan
4
Macao Forum, Court 4
15 February 2012, 13:30 UTC+8

Hong Kong
1

			1	2	3
1	(Japan) (Hong Kong)	Sayaka Sato; Yip Pui Yin	20; 22	18; 21
2	(Japan) (Hong Kong)	Eriko Hirose; Chan Tsz Ka	21; 16	21; 16
3	(Japan) (Hong Kong)	Mizuki Fujii / Reika Kakiiwa; Poon Lok Yan / Tse Ying Suet	21; 15	21; 19
4	(Japan) (Hong Kong)	Ai Goto; Mong Kwan Yi	22; 20	21; 14
5	(Japan) (Hong Kong)	Miyuki Maeda / Satoko Suetsuna; Chan Tsz Ka / Chau Hoi Wah	21; 18	21; 17

=== Knockout stage ===
Quarter-finals
X1	Chinese Taipei	3
Z2	Hong Kong	1
W1	China	3
Y2	Indonesia	0
Z1	Japan	3
X2	Singapore	0
Y1	Thailand	3
W2	Malaysia	0

Semi-finals
X1	Chinese Taipei	0
W1	China	3
Z1	Japan	3
Y1	Thailand	2

Final
W1	China	2
Z1	Japan	3
Third place
X1	Chinese Taipei	2
Y1	Thailand	3

==== Quarter-finals ====
Chinese Taipei
3
Macao Forum, Court 1
16 February 2012, 13:30 UTC+8

Hong Kong
1

			1	2	3
1	(Chinese Taipei) (Hong Kong)	Cheng Shao-chieh; Yip Pui Yin	14; 21	16; 21
2	(Chinese Taipei) (Hong Kong)	Tai Tzu-ying; Chan Tsz Ka	21; 14	21; 18
3	(Chinese Taipei) (Hong Kong)	Pai Hsiao-ma; Tse Ying Suet	21; 19	21; 18
4	(Chinese Taipei) (Hong Kong)	Hsieh Pei-chen / Wang Pei-rong; Chan Tsz Ka / Chau Hoi Wah	21; 8	21; 17
5	(Chinese Taipei) (Hong Kong)	Cheng Wen-hsing / Chien Yu-chin; Poon Lok Yan / Tse Ying Suet				not played

Japan
3
Macao Forum, Court 3
16 February 2012, 13:30 UTC+8

Singapore
0

			1	2	3
1	(Japan) (Singapore)	Sayaka Sato; Gu Juan	21; 10	21; 18
2	(Japan) (Singapore)	Mizuki Fujii / Reika Kakiiwa; Shinta Mulia Sari / Yao Lei	21; 16	21; 15
3	(Japan) (Singapore)	Eriko Hirose; Fu Mingtian	21; 11	21; 13
4	(Japan) (Singapore)	Miyuki Maeda / Satoko Suetsuna; Chen Jiayuan / Thng Ting Ting				not played
5	(Japan) (Singapore)	Ai Goto; Xing Aiying				not played

China
3
Macao Forum, Court 3
16 February 2012, 18:30 UTC+8

Indonesia
0

			1	2	3
1	(China) (Indonesia)	Jiang Yanjiao; Adriyanti Firdasari	20; 22	21; 8	21; 9
2	(China) (Indonesia)	Tian Qing / Zhao Yunlei; Meiliana Jauhari / Greysia Polii	21; 7	21; 9
3	(China) (Indonesia)	Liu Xin; Maria Febe Kusumastuti	21; 14	21; 17
4	(China) (Indonesia)	Cheng Shu / Pan Pan; Anneke Feinya Agustin / Nitya Krishinda Maheswari				not played
5	(China) (Indonesia)	Liu Xin; Lindaweni Fanetri				not played

Thailand
3
Macao Forum, Court 1
16 February 2012, 18:30 UTC+8

Malaysia
0

			1	2	3
1	(Thailand) (Malaysia)	Ratchanok Intanon; Tee Jing Yi	21; 8	21; 7
2	(Thailand) (Malaysia)	Porntip Buranaprasertsuk; Lyddia Cheah	21; 19	21; 13
3	(Thailand) (Malaysia)	Sapsiree Taerattanachai; Yang Li Lian	21; 12	21; 10
4	(Thailand) (Malaysia)	Saralee Thungthongkam / Kunchala Voravichitchaikul; Goh Liu Ying / Vivian Hoo				not played
5	(Thailand) (Malaysia)	Savitree Amitrapai / Sapsiree Taerattanachai; Chin Eei Hui / Wong Pei Tty				not played

==== Semi-finals ====
China
3
Macao Forum, Court 3
17 February 2012, 13:30 UTC+8

Chinese Taipei
0

			1	2	3
1	(China) (Chinese Taipei)	Jiang Yanjiao; Tai Tzu-ying	21; 12	21; 15
2	(China) (Chinese Taipei)	Tian Qing / Zhao Yunlei; Cheng Wen-hsing / Chien Yu-chin	21; 13	21; 13
3	(China) (Chinese Taipei)	Li Xuerui; Pai Hsiao-ma	21; 19	24; 22
4	(China) (Chinese Taipei)	Cheng Shu / Pan Pan; Hsieh Pei-chen / Wang Pei-rong				not played
5	(China) (Chinese Taipei)	Liu Xin; Hung Shih-chieh				not played

Thailand
2
Macao Forum, Court 2
17 February 2012, 13:30 UTC+8

Japan
3

			1	2	3
1	(Thailand) (Japan)	Ratchanok Intanon; Eriko Hirose	16; 21	21; 17	21; 17
2	(Thailand) (Japan)	Porntip Buranaprasertsuk; Ai Goto	21; 14	22; 20
3	(Thailand) (Japan)	Sapsiree Taerattanachai; Minatsu Mitani	15; 21	21; 19	16; 21
4	(Thailand) (Japan)	Saralee Thungthongkam / Kunchala Voravichitchaikul; Shizuka Matsuo / Mami Naito	17; 21	11; 21
5	(Thailand) (Japan)	Savitree Amitrapai / Sapsiree Taerattanachai; Miyuki Maeda / Satoko Suetsuna	17; 21	9; 21

==== Third place ====
Chinese Taipei
2
Macao Forum, Court 2
18 February 2012, 13:30 UTC+8

Thailand
3

			1	2	3
1	(Chinese Taipei) (Thailand)	Cheng Shao-chieh; Ratchanok Intanon	19; 21	13; 21
2	(Chinese Taipei) (Thailand)	Cheng Wen-hsing / Chien Yu-chin; Duanganong Aroonkesorn / Kunchala Voravichitchaikul	21; 15	21; 11
3	(Chinese Taipei) (Thailand)	Tai Tzu-ying; Porntip Buranaprasertsuk	18; 21	28; 26	19; 21
4	(Chinese Taipei) (Thailand)	Wang Pei-rong / Hsieh Pei-chen; Savitree Amitrapai / Nessara Somsri	21; 17	21; 13
5	(Chinese Taipei) (Thailand)	Pai Hsiao-ma; Nitchaon Jindapol	21; 19	17; 21	19; 21

==== Final ====
China
2
Macao Forum, Court 3
18 February 2012, 18:30 UTC+8

Japan
3

			1	2	3
1	(China) (Japan)	Li Xuerui; Sayaka Sato	21; 18	12; 21	21; 6
2	(China) (Japan)	Tian Qing / Zhao Yunlei; Mizuki Fujii / Reika Kakiiwa	21; 19	21; 15
3	(China) (Japan)	Liu Xin; Eriko Hirose	23; 25	21; 12	16; 21
4	(China) (Japan)	Cheng Shu / Pan Pan; Mami Naito / Shizuka Matsuo	14; 21	16; 21
5	(China) (Japan)	Wang Lin; Minatsu Mitani	19; 21	14; 21

=== Classification round ===
Pos	Team	Pld	W	L	MF	MA	MD	GF	GA	GD	PF	PA	PD	Pts	Qualification
1	Indonesia	3	3	0	14	1	+13	28	7	+21	698	517	+181	3	2012 Uber Cup
2	Singapore	3	2	1	6	9	−3	18	20	−2	649	685	−36	2	
3	Hong Kong	3	1	2	6	9	−3	14	21	−7	607	637	−30	1	
4	Malaysia	3	0	3	4	11	−7	11	23	−12	540	655	−115	0	

Source: BadmintonCN

Indonesia
5
Macao Forum, Court 1
17 February 2012, 09:00 UTC+8

Singapore
0

			1	2	3
1	(Indonesia) (Singapore)	Adriyanti Firdasari; Gu Juan	21; 11	10; 21	21; 16
2	(Indonesia) (Singapore)	Meiliana Jauhari / Greysia Polii; Shinta Mulia Sari / Yao Lei	21; 16	22; 20
3	(Indonesia) (Singapore)	Maria Febe Kusumastuti; Fu Mingtian	21; 16	17; 21	21; 12
4	(Indonesia) (Singapore)	Anneke Feinya Agustin / Nitya Krishinda Maheswari; Chen Jiayuan / Thng Ting Ting	21; 5	21; 16
5	(Indonesia) (Singapore)	Lindaweni Fanetri; Xing Aiying	18; 21	21; 12	21; 16

Hong Kong
3
Macao Forum, Court 2
17 February 2012, 09:00 UTC+8

Malaysia
2

			1	2	3
1	(Hong Kong) (Malaysia)	Yip Pui Yin; Tee Jing Yi	21; 12	21; 9
2	(Hong Kong) (Malaysia)	Poon Lok Yan / Tse Ying Suet; Chin Eei Hui / Wong Pei Tty	16; 21	18; 21
3	(Hong Kong) (Malaysia)	Chan Tsz Ka; Lyddia Cheah	22; 20	18; 21	21; 17
4	(Hong Kong) (Malaysia)	Chan Hung Yung / Chau Hoi Wah; Goh Liu Ying / Lim Yin Loo	19; 21	15; 21
5	(Hong Kong) (Malaysia)	Mong Kwan Yi; Sannatasah Saniru	21; 13	21; 15

Indonesia
5
Macao Forum, Court 1
18 February 2012, 09:00 UTC+8

Malaysia
0

			1	2	3
1	(Indonesia) (Malaysia)	Adriyanti Firdasari; Lydia Cheah Li Ya	21; 7	21; 13
2	(Indonesia) (Malaysia)	Meiliana Jauhari / Greysia Polii; Vivian Hoo / Woon Khe Wei	21; 15	18; 21	21; 15
3	(Indonesia) (Malaysia)	Maria Febe Kusumastuti; Sannatasah Saniru	21; 13	21; 18
4	(Indonesia) (Malaysia)	Anneke Feinya Agustin / Nitya Krishinda Maheswari; Chin Eei Hui / Goh Liu Ying	11; 21	21; 8	21; 18
5	(Indonesia) (Malaysia)	Lindaweni Fanetri; Yang Li Lian	21; 10	21; 9

Singapore
3
Macao Forum, Court 2
18 February 2012, 09:00 UTC+8

Hong Kong
2

			1	2	3
1	(Singapore) (Hong Kong)	Gu Juan; Yip Pui Yin	21; 10	21; 9
2	(Singapore) (Hong Kong)	Fu Mingtian; Chan Tsz Ka	21; 17	10; 21	8; 21
3	(Singapore) (Hong Kong)	Shinta Mulia Sari / Yao Lei; Poon Lok Yan / Tse Ying Suet	21; 18	14; 21	21; 15
4	(Singapore) (Hong Kong)	Xing Aiying; Cheung Ngan Yi	21; 19	19; 21	11; 21
5	(Singapore) (Hong Kong)	Chen Jiayuan / Thng Ting Ting; Chan Tsz Ka / Chau Hoi Wah	13; 21	21; 16	21; 18

Indonesia
4
Macao Forum, Court 3
19 February 2012, 09:00 UTC+8

Hong Kong
1

			1	2	3
1	(Indonesia) (Hong Kong)	Adriyanti Firdasari; Chan Hung Yung	21; 17	21; 15
2	(Indonesia) (Hong Kong)	Maria Febe Kusumastuti; Mong Kwan Yi	21; 11	21; 10
3	(Indonesia) (Hong Kong)	Meiliana Jauhari / Greysia Polii; Poon Lok Yan / Tse Ying Suet	21; 18	21; 18
4	(Indonesia) (Hong Kong)	Lindaweni Fanetri; Cheung Ngan Yi	21; 23	14; 21
5	(Indonesia) (Hong Kong)	Anneke Feinya Agustin / Nitya Krishinda Maheswari; Chan Hung Yung / Mong Kwan Yi	21; 11	21; 2

Singapore
3
Macao Forum, Court 1
19 February 2012, 09:00 UTC+8

Malaysia
2

			1	2	3
1	(Singapore) (Malaysia)	Gu Juan; Tee Jing Yi	13; 21	21; 10	15; 21
2	(Singapore) (Malaysia)	Shinta Mulia Sari / Yao Lei; Goh Liu Ying / Lim Yin Loo	21; 13	21; 16
3	(Singapore) (Malaysia)	Fu Mingtian; Sannatasah Saniru	21; 12	21; 15
4	(Singapore) (Malaysia)	Chen Jiayuan / Thng Ting Ting; Vivian Hoo / Wong Pei Tty	14; 21	14; 21
5	(Singapore) (Malaysia)	Liang Xiaoyu; Yang Li Lian	21; 14	21; 17

=== Qualified teams ===
- Japan (21st appearance)
- China (15th appearance)
- Thailand (3rd appearance)
- Chinese Taipei (3rd appearance)
- Indonesia (21st appearance)
