= Dragon and lion dance at the 2007 Asian Indoor Games =

- Venue: Macao Forum
- Dates: 1–2 November 2007

Dragon and lion dance at the 2007 Asian Indoor Games was held in Macao Forum, Macau, China from 1 November to 2 November 2007.

== Medalists ==
=== Dragon dance ===
Event	Gold	Silver	Bronze
Compulsory	China; Cai Weifu; Chen Yuehan; Lu Tingying; Ma Sihua; Qu Jieping; Shen Jinhe; Shen Jun; Wang Lei; Zhang Bin; Zhang Hui; Zheng Yu; Zhou Zhijun	Chinese Taipei; Chang Chi-shan; Chang Shih-ying; Chen Yue-ting; Chen Yun-chen; Chi Chih-liang; Chiang Li-tzu; Hsieh Wen-che; Hu Shen-hsiang; Jan Mao-ping; Kuo Han-pin; Lai Cheng-po; Liang Teng-wei; Tao Jeng-syong; Wu Wen-chin	Macau; Chao Kin Wang; Chio Man Tou; Kam Wai Kit; Kong Kan Pio; Kou Iong Chi; Lei Cho In; Lei Io Neng; Leong Wai Ngai; Lo Ka Seng; Loi Im Teng; Mou Wai Hong; Ng Chi Ip; Ng Ka Fu; Wong Ka Kin
Optional	Singapore; Chan Chee Seng; Chia Pojian; Chia Qingfa; Michael Heng; Lee Tuck Lun; Leong Richao; Lim Jun Hao; Liu Dong Song; Liu Jilong; Terry Tan; Tay Yijie; Tay Yineng; Peter Wang; Zhang Guohui	China; Cai Weifu; Chen Yuehan; Lu Tingying; Ma Sihua; Qu Jieping; Shen Jinhe; Shen Jun; Wang Lei; Zhang Bin; Zhang Hui; Zheng Yu; Zhou Zhijun	Malaysia; Boo Chen Loong; Cher Chin Yong; Chua Khai Ping; Hoo Jenn Shyang; Lau Chin Chuen; Lau Yong Meng; Lim Chap Yeong; Ng Chi Chang; Ng Chi Khai; Ng Per Yuean; Own Yen Ming; Sia Chee Hong; Tan Jiunn Siong; Tan Teck Sien

=== Northern lion ===
Event	Gold	Silver	Bronze
Compulsory	China; Chen Weijin; Guo Shaohua; Li Yuzhong; Qi Fei; Teng Shuyun; Wan Yanjianfeng; Yang Xiangyi	Hong Kong; Cheung Wai Yu; Lee Tsun Ho; Lawrence Leung; Lo Chi Lun; Ma Wai Cheung; Yami Mak; Tang Kai Him; Tang Tak Wai; Tang Wan Man; Yuen Lai Yan	Vietnam; Giang Quốc Nghiệp; Huỳnh Công Phát; Lê Minh Cảnh; Lê Minh Quang; Vương Vĩ Nguyên
Optional	China; Chen Weijin; Guo Shaohua; Li Yuzhong; Qi Fei; Teng Shuyun; Wan Yanjianfeng; Yang Xiangyi	Macau; Cai Yi Yi; Chan Ka Hou; Che Seng Seong; Choi Po Hio; Kou Kun Chi; Ng Hong Mang; Shao Shan Xing; Si Chon Pui; Si Iek Long; Wong Chou Fai	Chinese Taipei; Chen Wei-chieh; Lin Chun-hsien; Lo Chao-yu; Tai Wei-hsun; Wu Sung-chih; Yeh Tzu-hao; Yu Ching-hui

=== Southern lion ===
Event	Gold	Silver	Bronze
Compulsory	China; Jiao Genping; Liang Jianzhao; Lin Chujun; Liu Xuefeng; Tan Lida; Tan Liquan; Zhao Wande	Macau; Chan Chi Hou; Chan Kin Keong; Chan Wai Man; Cheang Hou Chun; Ku Hoi Ian; Lei Cho Ieng; Lei Ian Ian; Wong Cheng Nga; Wong Ka Weng	Singapore; Chan Kok Hui; Benjamin Chua; Lim Liang Hong; Lim Wei Siong; Andrew Liu; Tan Yong Wah; Kenny Teo; Teo Kian Wei
Optional	Macau; Chan Chi Hou; Chan Kin Keong; Chan Wai Man; Cheang Hou Chun; Ku Hoi Ian; Lei Cho Ieng; Lei Ian Ian; Wong Cheng Nga; Wong Ka Weng	Malaysia; Chong Kok Fu; Er Chong Yen; Lwee Wee Chien; Pang Pee Wei; Si Tiam Yong; Te Hwa Chong; Tiong Chun Khai; Wong Lian Khai	China; Jiao Genping; Liang Jianzhao; Lin Chujun; Liu Xuefeng; Tan Lida; Tan Liquan; Zhao Wande

== Medal table ==
Rank	Nation	Gold	Silver	Bronze	Total
1	China (CHN)	4	1	1	6
2	Macau (MAC)	1	2	1	4
3	Singapore (SIN)	1	0	1	2
4	Chinese Taipei (TPE)	0	1	1	2
4	Malaysia (MAS)	0	1	1	2
6	Hong Kong (HKG)	0	1	0	1
7	Vietnam (VIE)	0	0	1	1
Totals (7 entries)		6	6	6	18

== Results ==
=== Dragon dance ===
==== Compulsory ====
1 November

Rank	Team	Score
1st place, gold medalist(s)	China	9.26
2nd place, silver medalist(s)	Chinese Taipei	9.15
3rd place, bronze medalist(s)	Macau	9.12
4	Singapore	9.04
5	Malaysia	8.75
6	Indonesia	8.47
7	Hong Kong	8.36

==== Optional ====
2 November

Rank	Team	Score
1st place, gold medalist(s)	Singapore	9.25
2nd place, silver medalist(s)	China	9.21
3rd place, bronze medalist(s)	Malaysia	9.15
4	Chinese Taipei	9.11
5	Hong Kong	9.07
6	Macau	9.04
7	Indonesia	8.70

=== Northern lion ===
==== Compulsory ====
1 November

Rank	Team	Score
1st place, gold medalist(s)	China	9.26
2nd place, silver medalist(s)	Hong Kong	9.04
3rd place, bronze medalist(s)	Vietnam	8.98
4	Chinese Taipei	8.69
5	Malaysia	8.57
—	Macau	DNS

==== Optional ====
2 November

Rank	Team	Score
1st place, gold medalist(s)	China	9.24
2nd place, silver medalist(s)	Macau	8.79
3rd place, bronze medalist(s)	Chinese Taipei	8.74
4	Hong Kong	8.72
5	Malaysia	8.23

=== Southern lion ===
==== Compulsory ====
1 November

Rank	Team	Score
1st place, gold medalist(s)	China	9.27
2nd place, silver medalist(s)	Macau	9.18
3rd place, bronze medalist(s)	Singapore	9.07
4	Malaysia	9.06
5	Vietnam	7.64
6	Hong Kong	7.31

==== Optional ====
2 November

Rank	Team	Score
1st place, gold medalist(s)	Macau	9.25
2nd place, silver medalist(s)	Malaysia	9.18
3rd place, bronze medalist(s)	China	9.17
4	Vietnam	9.02
5	Hong Kong	8.97
6	Indonesia	8.91
7	Singapore	8.66
