= 2012 Thomas Cup group stage =

This article lists the complete results of the group stage of the 2012 Thomas Cup in Wuhan, China.

== Group A ==
Team	Pts	Pld	W	L
China	2	2	2	0
Indonesia	1	2	1	1
England	0	2	0	2

=== China vs. England ===
China
5
Wuhan Sports Gymnasium Center Court 1
20 May 2012
19:00

England
0

			1	2	3
1	(China) (England)	Lin Dan; Rajiv Ouseph	21; 14	21; 10
2	(China) (England)	Cai Yun / Fu Haifeng; Chris Adcock / Andrew Ellis	21; 11	22; 20
3	(China) (England)	Chen Long; Ben Beckman	21; 5	21; 5
4	(China) (England)	Chai Biao / Guo Zhendong; Chris Langridge / Peter Mills	21; 10	21; 12
5	(China) (England)	Du Pengyu; Toby Penty	21; 7	21; 11

=== Indonesia vs. England ===
Indonesia
4
Wuhan Sports Gymnasium Center Court 1
21 May 2012
19:00

England
1

			1	2	3
1	(Indonesia) (England)	Simon Santoso; Rajiv Ouseph	21; 19	21; 9
2	(Indonesia) (England)	Markis Kido / Hendra Setiawan; Chris Adcock / Andrew Ellis	19; 21	21; 14	17; 21
3	(Indonesia) (England)	Taufik Hidayat; Carl Baxter	21; 12	21; 16
4	(Indonesia) (England)	Mohammad Ahsan / Alvent Yulianto; Chris Langridge / Nathan Robertson	19; 21	21; 12	21; 19
5	(Indonesia) (England)	Dionysius Hayom Rumbaka; Ben Beckman	21; 11	21; 13

=== China vs. Indonesia ===
China
5
Wuhan Sports Gymnasium Center Court 1
22 May 2012
19:00

Indonesia
0

			1	2	3
1	(China) (Indonesia)	Lin Dan; Simon Santoso	21; 10	21; 17
2	(China) (Indonesia)	Cai Yun / Fu Haifeng; Markis Kido / Bona Septano	21; 14	21; 8
3	(China) (Indonesia)	Chen Long; Tommy Sugiarto	21; 12	21; 16
4	(China) (Indonesia)	Shen Ye / Hong Wei; Hendra Setiawan / Rian Agung Saputro	16; 21	21; 10	21; 9
5	(China) (Indonesia)	Chen Jin; Dionysius Hayom Rumbaka	21; 7	21; 10

== Group B ==
Team	Pts	Pld	W	L
Japan	2	2	2	0
Russia	1	2	1	1
New Zealand	0	2	0	2

=== Japan vs. New Zealand ===
Japan
5
Wuhan Sports Gymnasium Center Court 3
20 May 2012
19:00

New Zealand
0

			1	2	3
1	(Japan) (New Zealand)	Sho Sasaki; James Eunson	21; 13	21; 6
2	(Japan) (New Zealand)	Kenichi Tago; Michael Fowke	21; 12	21; 9
3	(Japan) (New Zealand)	Shoji Sato / Naoki Kawamae; Kevin Dennerly-Minturn / Oliver Leydon-Davis	21; 7	21; 9
4	(Japan) (New Zealand)	Takuma Ueda; Luke Charlesworth	21; 6	21; 4
5	(Japan) (New Zealand)	Hirokatsu Hashimoto / Noriyasu Hirata; James Eunson / Michael Fowke	21; 5	21; 10

=== Russia vs. New Zealand ===
Russia
5
Wuhan Sports Gymnasium Center Court 3
21 May 2012
19:00

New Zealand
0

			1	2	3
1	(Russia) (New Zealand)	Vladimir Ivanov; James Eunson	21; 16	21; 18
2	(Russia) (New Zealand)	Ivan Sozonov; Michael Fowke	21; 8	10; 21	21; 18
3	(Russia) (New Zealand)	Vitalij Durkin / Aleksandr Nikolaenko; Kevin Dennerly-Minturn / Oliver Leydon-Davis	21; 12	21; 8
4	(Russia) (New Zealand)	Vladimir Malkov; Luke Charlesworth	21; 13	21; 11
5	(Russia) (New Zealand)	Evgenij Dremin / Sergey Lunev; James Eunson / Michael Fowke	21; 12	21; 10

=== Japan vs. Russia ===
Japan
5
Wuhan Sports Gymnasium Center Court 3
22 May 2012
19:00

Russia
0

			1	2	3
1	(Japan) (Russia)	Sho Sasaki; Vladimir Ivanov	21; 14	21; 15
2	(Japan) (Russia)	Hiroyuki Endo / Kenichi Hayakawa; Vitalij Durkin / Aleksandr Nikolaenko	21; 17	23; 21
3	(Japan) (Russia)	Kenichi Tago; Vladimir Malkov	21; 14	21; 6
4	(Japan) (Russia)	Shoji Sato / Naoki Kawamae; Vladimir Ivanov / Ivan Sozonov	21; 18	21; 12
5	(Japan) (Russia)	Takuma Ueda; Anatoliy Yartsev	21; 9	21; 13

== Group C ==
Team	Pts	Pld	W	L
Denmark	2	2	2	0
Malaysia	1	2	1	0
South Africa	0	2	0	2

=== Denmark vs. South Africa ===
Denmark
5
Wuhan Sports Gymnasium Center Court 4
20 May 2012
13:00

South Africa
0

			1	2	3
1	(Denmark) (South Africa)	Peter Gade; Jacob Malieka	21; 7	21; 6
2	(Denmark) (South Africa)	Jan Ø. Jørgensen; Willem Viljoen	21; 7	21; 11
3	(Denmark) (South Africa)	Viktor Axelsen; Prakash Viyajanathl	21; 4	21; 5
4	(Denmark) (South Africa)	Mathias Boe / Carsten Mogensen; Dorian Lance James / Willem Viljoen	21; 12	21; 14
5	(Denmark) (South Africa)	Jonas Rasmussen / Mads Conrad-Petersen; Prakash Viyajanath / Jacob Malieka	21; 5	21; 5

=== Malaysia vs. South Africa ===
Malaysia
5
Wuhan Sports Gymnasium Center Court 2
21 May 2012
13:00

South Africa
0

			1	2	3
1	(Malaysia) (South Africa)	Lee Chong Wei; Jacob Malieka	21; 13	21; 10
2	(Malaysia) (South Africa)	Daren Liew; Willem Viljoen	21; 11	21; 9
3	(Malaysia) (South Africa)	Muhammad Hafiz Hashim; Prakash Viyajanathl	21; 10	21; 8
4	(Malaysia) (South Africa)	Tan Boon Heong / Koo Kien Keat; Dorian Lance James / Willem Viljoen	21; 8	21; 12
5	(Malaysia) (South Africa)	Goh V Shem / Lim Khim Wah; Prakash Viyajanath / Jacob Malieka	21; 11	21; 14

=== Denmark vs. Malaysia ===
Denmark
3
Wuhan Sports Gymnasium Center Court 1
22 May 2012
13:00

Malaysia
2

			1	2	3
1	(Denmark) (Malaysia)	Peter Gade; Lee Chong Wei	1; 2			retired
2	(Denmark) (Malaysia)	Carsten Mogensen / Mathias Boe; Tan Boon Heong / Hoon Thien How	21; 17	21; 23	21; 11
3	(Denmark) (Malaysia)	Jan Ø. Jørgensen; Daren Liew	15; 21	13; 21
4	(Denmark) (Malaysia)	Jonas Rasmussen / Joachim Fischer Nielsen; Koo Kien Keat / Goh V Shem	21; 18	21; 15
5	(Denmark) (Malaysia)	Hans-Kristian Vittinghus; Muhammad Hafiz Hashim	21; 17	17; 21	19; 21

== Group D ==
Team	Pts	Pld	W	L
South Korea	2	2	2	0
Germany	2	2	1	0
United States	0	2	0	2

=== Korea vs. United States ===
South Korea
5
Wuhan Sports Gymnasium Center Court 2
20 May 2012
13:00

United States
0

			1	2	3
1	(South Korea) (United States)	Shon Wan-ho; Sattawat Pongnairat	21; 7	21; 6
2	(South Korea) (United States)	Yoo Yeon-seong / Ko Sung-hyun; Howard Bach / Tony Gunawan	21; 8	17; 21	21; 13
3	(South Korea) (United States)	Hong Ji-hoon; Howard Shu	21; 6	21; 11
4	(South Korea) (United States)	Kim Sa-rang / Kim Ki-jung; Phillip Chew / Sattawat Pongnairat	21; 9	21; 6
5	(South Korea) (United States)	Lee Dong-keun; Nicholas Jinadasa	21; 8	21; 9

=== Germany vs. United States ===
Germany
5
Wuhan Sports Gymnasium Center Court 4
21 May 2012
13:00

United States
0

			1	2	3
1	(Germany) (United States)	Marc Zwiebler; Sattawat Pongnairat	21; 15	21; 18
2	(Germany) (United States)	Ingo Kindervater / Johannes Schöttler; Howard Bach / Tony Gunawan	21; 19	17; 21	21; 11
3	(Germany) (United States)	Dieter Domke; Howard Shu	21; 16	21; 11
4	(Germany) (United States)	Michael Fuchs / Oliver Roth; Phillip Chew / Sattawat Pongnairat	21; 13	21; 10
5	(Germany) (United States)	Marcel Reuter; Nicholas Jinadasa	21; 11	21; 11

=== Korea vs. Germany ===
South Korea
3
Wuhan Sports Gymnasium Center Court 3
22 May 2012
13:00

Germany
2

			1	2	3
1	(South Korea) (Germany)	Lee Hyun-il; Marc Zwiebler	21; 19	21; 8
2	(South Korea) (Germany)	Ko Sung-hyun / Lee Yong-dae; Ingo Kindervater / Johannes Schöttler	22; 20	21; 12
3	(South Korea) (Germany)	Shon Wan-ho; Dieter Domke	17; 21	21; 15	11; 21
4	(South Korea) (Germany)	Kim Sa-rang / Kim Ki-jung; Michael Fuchs / Oliver Roth	21; 13	21; 13
5	(South Korea) (Germany)	Hong Ji-hoon; Lukas Schmidt	17; 21	21; 9	18; 21
