= 2012 Uber Cup group stage =

This article lists the complete results of the group stage of the 2012 Uber Cup in Wuhan, China.

== Group A ==
Team	Pts	Pld	W	L
China	2	2	1	0
Indonesia	1	2	1	0
South Africa	0	2	0	2

=== China vs. South Africa ===
China
5
Wuhan Sports Gymnasium Center Court 3
20 May 2012
13:00

South Africa
0

			1	2	3
1	(China) (South Africa)	Wang Yihan; Kerry-Lee Harrington	21; 1	21; 2
2	(China) (South Africa)	Wang Xin; Stacey Doubell	21; 5	21; 7
3	(China) (South Africa)	Li Xuerui; Annari Viljoen	21; 6	21; 2
4	(China) (South Africa)	Cheng Shu / Pan Pan; Stacey Doubell / Kerry-Lee Harrington	21; 6	21; 5
5	(China) (South Africa)	Yu Yang / Wang Xiaoli; Michelle Claire Edwards / Annari Viljoen	21; 3	21; 7

=== Indonesia vs. South Africa ===
Indonesia
5
Wuhan Sports Gymnasium Center Court 3
21 May 2012
13:00

South Africa
0

			1	2	3
1	(Indonesia) (South Africa)	Maria Febe Kusumastuti; Kerry-Lee Harrington	21; 9	21; 9
2	(Indonesia) (South Africa)	Adriyanti Firdasari; Stacey Doubell	21; 9	21; 5
3	(Indonesia) (South Africa)	Lindaweni Fanetri; Annari Viljoen	21; 5	21; 8
4	(Indonesia) (South Africa)	Nitya Krishinda Maheswari / Anneke Feinya Agustin; Stacey Doubell / Kerry-Lee Harrington	21; 5	21; 5
5	(Indonesia) (South Africa)	Greysia Polii / Meiliana Jauhari; Michelle Claire Edwards / Annari Viljoen	21; 2	21; 12

=== China vs. Indonesia ===
China
5
Wuhan Sports Gymnasium Center Court 2
22 May 2012
19:00

Indonesia
0

			1	2	3
1	(China) (Indonesia)	Wang Yihan; Maria Febe Kusumastuti	21; 10	11; 3		retired
2	(China) (Indonesia)	Yu Yang / Wang Xiaoli; Nitya Krishinda Maheswari / Anneke Feinya Agustin	21; 16	21; 17
3	(China) (Indonesia)	Wang Shixian; Lindaweni Fanetri	17; 21	10; 3		retired
4	(China) (Indonesia)	Zhao Yunlei / Tian Qing; Suci Rizki Andini / Della Destiara Haris	24; 22	19; 21	21; 15
5	(China) (Indonesia)	Li Xuerui; Bellaetrix Manuputty	21; 12	21; 18

== Group B ==
Team	Pts	Pld	W	L
Thailand	1	2	1	1
Chinese Taipei	1	2	1	1
Netherlands	1	2	1	1

=== Chinese Taipei vs. Netherlands ===
Chinese Taipei
2
Wuhan Sports Gymnasium Center Court 4
20 May 2012
19:00

Netherlands
3

			1	2	3
1	(Chinese Taipei) (Netherlands)	Tai Tzu-ying; Yao Jie	16; 21	21; 16	18; 16	retired
2	(Chinese Taipei) (Netherlands)	Cheng Wen-hsing / Chien Yu-chin; Selena Piek / Iris Tabeling	21; 10	14; 21	21; 16
3	(Chinese Taipei) (Netherlands)	Pai Hsiao-ma; Judith Meulendijks	21; 13	20; 22	20; 22
4	(Chinese Taipei) (Netherlands)	Tsai Pei-ling / Chiang Kai-hsin; Ilse Vaessen / Paulien van Dooremalen	21; 23	21; 14	15; 21
5	(Chinese Taipei) (Netherlands)	Hung Shih-han; Patty Stolzenbach	12; 21	18; 21

=== Thailand vs. Netherlands ===
Thailand
5
Wuhan Sports Gymnasium Center Court 4
21 May 2012
19:00

Netherlands
0

			1	2	3
1	(Thailand) (Netherlands)	Ratchanok Inthanon; Judith Meulendijks	21; 17	21; 11
2	(Thailand) (Netherlands)	Sapsiree Taerattanachai; Patty Stolzenbach	19; 21	21; 12	21; 12
3	(Thailand) (Netherlands)	Duanganong Aroonkesorn / Kunchala Voravichitchaikul; Selena Piek / Iris Tabeling	21; 16	21; 7
4	(Thailand) (Netherlands)	Nichaon Jindapon; Josephine Wentholt	21; 9	21; 12
5	(Thailand) (Netherlands)	Saralee Thungthongkam / Sapsiree Taerattanachai; Eefje Muskens / Samantha Braning	21; 18	21; 19

=== Chinese Taipei vs. Thailand ===
Chinese Taipei
3
Wuhan Sports Gymnasium Center Court 4
22 May 2012
19:00

Thailand
2

			1	2	3
1	(Chinese Taipei) (Thailand)	Tai Tzu-ying; Ratchanok Inthanon	21; 19	17; 21	26; 24
2	(Chinese Taipei) (Thailand)	Cheng Wen-hsing / Chien Yu-chin; Duanganong Aroonkesorn / Sapsiree Taerattanachai	21; 19	21; 9
3	(Chinese Taipei) (Thailand)	Pai Hsiao-ma; Porntip Buranaprasertsuk	21; 19	21; 17
4	(Chinese Taipei) (Thailand)	Wang Pei-rong / Hsieh Pei-chen; Saralee Thungthongkam / Kunchala Voravichitchaikul	19; 21	16; 21
5	(Chinese Taipei) (Thailand)	Hung Shih-han; Nichaon Jindapon	0; 2			retired

== Group C ==
Team	Pts	Pld	W	L
South Korea	2	2	2	0
Germany	1	2	1	0
Australia	0	2	0	2

=== Korea vs. Australia ===
South Korea
5
Wuhan Sports Gymnasium Center Court 2
20 May 2012
19:00

Australia
0

			1	2	3
1	(South Korea) (Australia)	Sung Ji-hyun; Victoria Na	21; 9	21; 9
2	(South Korea) (Australia)	Kim Min-jung / Ha Jung-eun; Renuga Veeran / Leanne Choo	21; 15	21; 10
3	(South Korea) (Australia)	Bae Youn-joo; Tara Pilven	21; 5	21; 2
4	(South Korea) (Australia)	Jang Ye-na / Eom Hye-won; Gronya Somerville / Jacqueline Guan	21; 7	21; 7
5	(South Korea) (Australia)	Hwang Hye-youn; Wendy Chen Hsuan-yu	21; 18	22; 20

=== Germany vs. Australia ===
Germany
3
Wuhan Sports Gymnasium Center Court 3
21 May 2012
19:00

Australia
2

			1	2	3
1	(Germany) (Australia)	Karin Schnaase; Victoria Na	21; 8	21; 10
2	(Germany) (Australia)	Carola Bott; Renuga Veeran	17; 21	21; 16	21; 17
3	(Germany) (Australia)	Johanna Goliszewski / Karin Schnaase; Tang He Tian / Eugenia Tanaka	21; 13	14; 21	15; 21
4	(Germany) (Australia)	Fabienne Deprez; Chen Hsuan-yu Wendy	21; 18	21; 17
5	(Germany) (Australia)	Carla Nelte / Isabel Herttrich; Renuga Veeran / Leanne Choo	21; 15	13; 21	14; 21

=== Korea vs. Germany ===
South Korea
5
Wuhan Sports Gymnasium Center Court 4
22 May 2012
13:00

Germany
0

			1	2	3
1	(South Korea) (Germany)	Sung Ji-hyun; Karin Schnaase	21; 18	21; 11
2	(South Korea) (Germany)	Bae Youn-joo; Carola Bott	21; 10	21; 10
3	(South Korea) (Germany)	Kim Min-jung / Ha Jung-eun; Carla Nelte / Johanna Goliszewski	21; 11	21; 12
4	(South Korea) (Germany)	Hwang Hye-youn; Fabienne Deprez	21; 17	21; 19
5	(South Korea) (Germany)	Kim Ha-na / Jung Kyung-eun; Isabel Herttrich / Carola Bott	21; 4	21; 10

== Group D ==
Team	Pts	Pld	W	L
Japan	2	2	2	0
Denmark	1	2	1	0
United States	0	2	0	2

=== Japan vs. United States ===
Japan
5
Wuhan Sports Gymnasium Center Court 1
20 May 2012
13:00

United States
0

			1	2	3
1	(Japan) (United States)	Sayaka Sato; Rena Wang	21; 17	21; 16
2	(Japan) (United States)	Eriko Hirose; Iris Wang	21; 15	21; 7
3	(Japan) (United States)	Mizuki Fujii / Reika Kakiiwa; Eva Lee / Paula Lynn Obanana	21; 8	21; 9
4	(Japan) (United States)	Minatsu Mitani; Jamie Subandhi	21; 10	21; 7
5	(Japan) (United States)	Misaki Matsutomo / Ayaka Takahashi; Rena Wang / Iris Wang	21; 15	21; 7

=== Denmark vs. United States ===
Denmark
4
Wuhan Sports Gymnasium Center Court 1
21 May 2012
13:00

United States
1

			1	2	3
1	(Denmark) (United States)	Tine Baun; Rena Wang	21; 12	21; 5
2	(Denmark) (United States)	Karina Jørgensen; Iris Wang	19; 21	21; 11	19; 21
3	(Denmark) (United States)	Kamilla Rytter Juhl / Christinna Pedersen; Eva Lee / Paula Lynn Obanana	22; 20	14; 21	21; 10
4	(Denmark) (United States)	Line Kjaersfeldt; Jamie Subandhi	21; 15	21; 16
5	(Denmark) (United States)	Marie Roepke / Line Damkjaer Kruse; Rena Wang / Iris Wang	21; 12	21; 15

=== Japan vs. Denmark ===
Japan
3
Wuhan Sports Gymnasium Center Court 2
22 May 2012
13:00

Denmark
2

			1	2	3
1	(Japan) (Denmark)	Sayaka Sato; Tine Baun	8; 21	19; 21
2	(Japan) (Denmark)	Mizuki Fujii / Reika Kakiiwa; Christinna Pedersen / Kamilla Rytter Juhl	21; 23	11; 21
3	(Japan) (Denmark)	Ai Goto; Line Kjaersfeldt	22; 20	21; 18
4	(Japan) (Denmark)	Mami Naito / Shizuka Matsuo; Marie Roepke / Line Damkjaer Kruse	21; 19	21; 14
5	(Japan) (Denmark)	Eriko Hirose; Lene Clausen	21; 10	21; 7
