= Long Ying =

Macanese badminton player (born 1985)

Long Ying 龍瑩
Personal information
- Born: 23 May 1985 (age 41) (Portuguese Macau) Macau
- Height: 1.68 m (5 ft 6 in)
- Weight: 55 kg (121 lb)

Sport
- Sport: Badminton

Women's singles, Women's doubles, Mixed doubles
- Highest ranking: 159 (Women's doubles-Mak Ka Lei)
- Current ranking: No ranking
- BWF profile (archived)
Medal record
Women's badminton
Representing Macau
Macau Local Badminton Open
Gold medal – first place	2004 Macau	Women's singles
Gold medal – first place	2004 Macau	Women's doubles
- Updated on 25 February, 2012

Long Ying (Chinese: 龍瑩; pinyin: Lóng Yíng; born 23 May 1985) is a Macanese badminton player.

== Life ==
In May 2007, Long Ying represented Macau in the Arafura Games. In the finals of the women's singles, she won with a score of 2–0 (21–12, 21–7) against her teammate Lei Sao Chi, receiving a gold medal. She also partnered with Lei Sao Chi in the Women's Doubles, beating the Australian team with a score of 2–0 (21–13, 21–6), receiving another gold medal.

In November 2010, Long Ying represented Macau, China in the 2010 Asian Games, participating in the women's doubles (partner: Mak Ka Lei), mixed doubles (partner: Chan Io Chong), and the women's team.
