= 2012 Pan American Thomas & Uber Cup Preliminaries =

Tournament details
- Dates: 17–19 February
- Venue: Los Angeles Badminton Club
- Location: El Monte, United States

The 2012 Pan American Thomas & Uber Cup Preliminaries was a continental badminton tournament held to determine the teams qualified for the 2012 Thomas & Uber Cup in Pan America. The event was held in El Monte, United States from 17 to 19 February 2012.

== Tournament ==
The 2012 Pan American Thomas & Uber Cup Preliminaries, is a continental team tournament staged to determine the teams in Pan America that are qualified for the 2012 Thomas & Uber Cup. This event was organized by Badminton Pan Am and USA Badminton. 13 teams, consisting of 8 men's teams and 5 women's teams entered the tournament.

== Men's team ==
=== Group stage ===
==== Group A ====
Pos	Team	Pld	W	L	MF	MA	MD	GF	GA	GD	PF	PA	PD	Pts	Qualification
1	Canada	3	3	0	13	2	+11	28	4	+24	665	392	+273	3	Knockout stage
2	Brazil	3	2	1	11	4	+7	22	10	+12	608	504	+104	2	Knockout stage
3	Suriname	3	1	2	5	10	−5	10	21	−11	476	590	−114	1	
4	Barbados	3	0	3	1	14	−13	3	28	−25	375	638	−263	0	

Source: BWF
- Canada vs Suriname

Canada
5
Los Angeles Badminton Club, Court 1
17 February 2012, 09:00 UTC−8

Suriname
0

			1	2	3
1	(Canada) (Suriname)	Joseph Rogers; Mitchel Wongsodikromo	21; 9	21; 11
2	(Canada) (Suriname)	Sergiy Shatenko; Virgil Soeroredjo	21; 15	21; 15
3	(Canada) (Suriname)	François Bourret / Toby Ng; Dylan Darmohoetomo / Irfan Djabar	21; 10	21; 11
4	(Canada) (Suriname)	Nyl Yakura; Redon Coulor	21; 13	21; 7
5	(Canada) (Suriname)	Adrian Liu / Derrick Ng; Virgil Soeroredjo / Mitchel Wongsodikromo	21; 13	21; 13

- Brazil vs Barbados

Brazil
5
Los Angeles Badminton Club, Court 3
17 February 2012, 09:00 UTC−8

Barbados
0

			1	2	3
1	(Brazil) (Barbados)	Daniel Paiola; Andre Padmore	21; 7	21; 7
2	(Brazil) (Barbados)	Alex Yuwan Tjong; Dakeil Thorpe	21; 12	21; 12
3	(Brazil) (Barbados)	Lucas Alves Pinto; Greg Padmore	21; 12	21; 12
4	(Brazil) (Barbados)	Daniel Paiola / Luiz dos Santos; Bradley Pilgrim / Dakeil Thorpe	21; 13	21; 8
5	(Brazil) (Barbados)	Hugo Arthuso / Lucas Alves Pinto; Andre Padmore / Kevin Wood	21; 16	21; 19

- Brazil vs Suriname

Brazil
4
Los Angeles Badminton Club, Court 2
17 February 2012, 14:00 UTC−8

Suriname
1

			1	2	3
1	(Brazil) (Suriname)	Daniel Paiola; Mitchel Wongsodikromo	21; 12	21; 13
2	(Brazil) (Suriname)	Alex Yuwan Tjong; Virgil Soeroredjo	20; 22	15; 21
3	(Brazil) (Suriname)	Luiz dos Santos; Irfan Djabar	21; 10	21; 7
4	(Brazil) (Suriname)	Hugo Arthuso / Daniel Paiola; Virgil Soeroredjo / Mitchel Wongsodikromo	21; 15	21; 18
5	(Brazil) (Suriname)	Luiz dos Santos / Alex Yuwan Tjong; Dylan Darmohoetomo / Irfan Djabar	21; 9	21; 14

- Canada vs Barbados

Canada
5
Los Angeles Badminton Club, Court 4
17 February 2012, 14:00 UTC−8

Barbados
0

			1	2	3
1	(Canada) (Barbados)	Joseph Rogers; Andre Padmore	21; 16	21; 6
2	(Canada) (Barbados)	Sergiy Shatenko; Dakeil Thorpe	21; 9	21; 2
3	(Canada) (Barbados)	Nyl Yakura; Bradley Pilgrim	21; 5	21; 8
4	(Canada) (Barbados)	Derrick Ng / Kevin Li; Andre Padmore / Kevin Wood	21; 7	21; 13
5	(Canada) (Barbados)	François Bourret / Toby Ng; Dakeil Thorpe / Bradley Pilgrim	21; 5	21; 9

- Suriname vs Barbados

Suriname
4
Los Angeles Badminton Club, Court 1
18 February 2012, 10:30 UTC−8

Barbados
1

			1	2	3
1	(Suriname) (Barbados)	Mitchel Wongsodikromo; Andre Padmore	21; 13	21; 12
2	(Suriname) (Barbados)	Virgil Soeroredjo; Dakeil Thorpe	21; 17	21; 8
3	(Suriname) (Barbados)	Dylan Darmohoetomo; Greg Padmore	17; 21	21; 18	21; 15
4	(Suriname) (Barbados)	Virgil Soeroredjo / Mitchel Wongsodikromo; Andre Padmore / Kevin Wood	21; 17	21; 14
5	(Suriname) (Barbados)	Redon Coulor / Irfan Djabar; Bradley Pilgrim / Dakeil Thorpe	19; 21	14; 21

- Brazil vs Canada

Brazil
2
Los Angeles Badminton Club, Court 2
18 February 2012, 10:30 UTC−8

Canada
3

			1	2	3
1	(Brazil) (Canada)	Daniel Paiola; Joseph Rogers	21; 17	18; 21	27; 25
2	(Brazil) (Canada)	Alex Yuwan Tjong; Sergiy Shatenko	15; 21	17; 21
3	(Brazil) (Canada)	Luiz dos Santos; Nyl Yakura	9; 21	15; 21
4	(Brazil) (Canada)	Hugo Arthuso / Alex Yuwan Tjong; François Bourret / Kevin Li	10; 21	21; 17	21; 18
5	(Brazil) (Canada)	Daniel Paiola / Luiz dos Santos; Adrian Liu / Derrick Ng	12; 21	9; 21

==== Group B ====
Pos	Team	Pld	W	L	MF	MA	MD	GF	GA	GD	PF	PA	PD	Pts	Qualification
1	United States (H)	3	3	0	12	3	+9	24	7	+17	610	407	+203	3	Knockout stage
2	Guatemala	3	2	1	12	3	+9	25	7	+18	625	491	+134	2	Knockout stage
3	Jamaica	3	1	2	6	9	−3	14	19	−5	566	592	−26	1	
4	Puerto Rico	3	0	3	0	15	−15	0	30	−30	320	631	−311	0	

Source: BWF
(H) Host
- United States vs Puerto Rico

United States
5
Los Angeles Badminton Club, Court 1
17 February 2012, 14:00 UTC−8

Puerto Rico
0

			1	2	3
1	(United States) (Puerto Rico)	Sattawat Pongnairat; Bryan Valentín	21; 8	21; 5
2	(United States) (Puerto Rico)	Howard Shu; Heriberto Torres	21; 11	21; 2
3	(United States) (Puerto Rico)	Nicholas Jinadasa; José Mercado	21; 9	21; 17
4	(United States) (Puerto Rico)	Howard Bach / Tony Gunawan; Heriberto Torres / Bryan Valentín	21; 2	21; 1
5	(United States) (Puerto Rico)	Phillip Chew / Sattawat Pongnairat; José Mercado / Héctor Ríos	21; 7	21; 12

- Guatemala vs Jamaica

Guatemala
4
Los Angeles Badminton Club, Court 3
17 February 2012, 14:00 UTC−8

Jamaica
1

			1	2	3
1	(Guatemala) (Jamaica)	Kevin Cordón; Charles Pyne	22; 20	21; 16
2	(Guatemala) (Jamaica)	Rodolfo Ramírez; Gareth Henry	20; 22	21; 18	15; 21
3	(Guatemala) (Jamaica)	Heymard Humblers; Garron Palmer	21; 12	21; 9
4	(Guatemala) (Jamaica)	Kevin Cordón / Rodolfo Ramírez; Gareth Henry / Garron Palmer	15; 21	21; 16	21; 13
5	(Guatemala) (Jamaica)	Heymard Humblers / Jonathan Solís; Gerald Isaacs / Charles Pyne	21; 15	21; 14

- Guatemala vs Puerto Rico

Guatemala
5
Los Angeles Badminton Club, Court 2
17 February 2012, 19:00 UTC−8

Puerto Rico
0

			1	2	3
1	(Guatemala) (Puerto Rico)	Kevin Cordón; Bryan Valentín	21; 10	21; 13
2	(Guatemala) (Puerto Rico)	Rodolfo Ramírez; Heriberto Torres	21; 11	21; 9
3	(Guatemala) (Puerto Rico)	Heymard Humblers; Héctor Ríos	21; 13	21; 16
4	(Guatemala) (Puerto Rico)	Rodolfo Ramírez / Jonathan Solís; Heriberto Torres / Bryan Valentín	21; 9	21; 13
5	(Guatemala) (Puerto Rico)	Heymard Humblers / Aníbal Marroquín; José Mercado / Héctor Ríos	21; 11	21; 15

- United States vs Jamaica

United States
5
Los Angeles Badminton Club, Court 4
17 February 2012, 19:00 UTC−8

Jamaica
0

			1	2	3
1	(United States) (Jamaica)	Sattawat Pongnairat; Charles Pyne	21; 12	21; 15
2	(United States) (Jamaica)	Howard Shu; Gareth Henry	21; 18	16; 21	21; 17
3	(United States) (Jamaica)	Nicholas Jinadasa; Garron Palmer	21; 19	21; 17
4	(United States) (Jamaica)	Phillip Chew / Tony Gunawan; Gareth Henry / Gerald Isaacs	21; 7	21; 9
5	(United States) (Jamaica)	Howard Bach / Nicholas Jinadasa; Garron Palmer / Charles Pyne	21; 8	21; 15

- United States vs Guatemala

United States
2
Los Angeles Badminton Club, Court 2
18 February 2012, 16:30 UTC−8

Guatemala
3

			1	2	3
1	(United States) (Guatemala)	Sattawat Pongnairat; Kevin Cordón	11; 21	16; 21
2	(United States) (Guatemala)	Howard Shu; Rodolfo Ramírez	19; 21	20; 22
3	(United States) (Guatemala)	Nicholas Jinadasa; Heymard Humblers	7; 21	17; 21
4	(United States) (Guatemala)	Howard Bach / Sattawat Pongnairat; Kevin Cordón / Rodolfo Ramírez	21; 17	21; 13
5	(United States) (Guatemala)	Tony Gunawan / Phillip Chew; Heymard Humblers / Aníbal Marroquín	21; 6	21; 12

- Jamaica vs Puerto Rico

Jamaica
5
Los Angeles Badminton Club, Court 4
18 February 2012, 16:30 UTC−8

Puerto Rico
0

			1	2	3
1	(Jamaica) (Puerto Rico)	Charles Pyne; Bryan Valentín	21; 10	21; 9
2	(Jamaica) (Puerto Rico)	Gareth Henry; Heriberto Torres	21; 8	21; 11
3	(Jamaica) (Puerto Rico)	Gerald Isaacs; José Mercado	21; 18	21; 10
4	(Jamaica) (Puerto Rico)	Gareth Henry / Garron Palmer; Heriberto Torres / Bryan Valentín	21; 14	21; 14
5	(Jamaica) (Puerto Rico)	Gerald Isaacs / Charles Pyne; José Mercado / Héctor Ríos	21; 12	22; 20

=== Knockout stage ===
==== Bracket ====
Semi-finals
19 February
Canada	0
United States	3
19 February
Guatemala	3
Brazil	0

Final
19 February
United States	3
Guatemala	1

==== Semi-finals ====
- Canada vs United States

Canada
0
Los Angeles Badminton Club, Court 2
19 February 2012, 10:30 UTC−8

United States
3

			1	2	3
1	(Canada) (United States)	Joseph Rogers; Sattawat Pongnairat	16; 21	9; 21
2	(Canada) (United States)	Adrian Liu / Toby Ng; Howard Bach / Phillip Chew	13; 21	15; 21
3	(Canada) (United States)	Sergiy Shatenko; Howard Shu	12; 21	20; 22
4	(Canada) (United States)	François Bourret / Derrick Ng; Tony Gunawan / Sattawat Pongnairat				not played
5	(Canada) (United States)	Nyl Yakura; Nicholas Jinadasa				not played

- Brazil vs Guatemala

Brazil
0
Los Angeles Badminton Club, Court 3
19 February 2012, 10:30 UTC−8

Guatemala
3

			1	2	3
1	(Brazil) (Guatemala)	Daniel Paiola; Kevin Cordón	12; 21	3; 21
2	(Brazil) (Guatemala)	Alex Yuwan Tjong; Rodolfo Ramírez	14; 21	19; 21
3	(Brazil) (Guatemala)	Luiz dos Santos; Heymard Humblers	22; 20	11; 21	17; 21
4	(Brazil) (Guatemala)	Hugo Arthuso / Daniel Paiola; Heymard Humblers / Aníbal Marroquín				not played
5	(Brazil) (Guatemala)	Luiz dos Santos / Alex Yuwan Tjong; Kevin Cordón / Rodolfo Ramírez				not played

==== Third place ====
- Canada vs Brazil

Canada
3
Los Angeles Badminton Club, Court 4
19 February 2012, 16:30 UTC−8

Brazil
0

			1	2	3
1	(Canada) (Brazil)	Sergiy Shatenko; Daniel Paiola	21; 19	22; 24	21; 15
2	(Canada) (Brazil)	Nyl Yakura; Alex Yuwan Tjong	21; 8	21; 19
3	(Canada) (Brazil)	François Bourret / Kevin Li; Daniel Paiola / Luiz dos Santos	21; 14	21; 15
4	(Canada) (Brazil)	Derrick Ng; Lucas Alves Pinto				not played
5	(Canada) (Brazil)	Adrian Liu / Toby Ng; Hugo Arthuso / Alex Yuwan Tjong				not played

=== Final ===
- United States vs. Guatemala

United States
3
Los Angeles Badminton Club, Court 3
19 February 2012, 16:30 UTC−8

Guatemala
1

			1	2	3
1	(United States) (Guatemala)	Sattawat Pongnairat; Kevin Cordón	20; 22	14; 21
2	(United States) (Guatemala)	Howard Shu; Rodolfo Ramírez	21; 14	21; 14
3	(United States) (Guatemala)	Howard Bach / Sattawat Pongnairat; Aníbal Marroquín / Jonathan Solís	21; 12	21; 5
4	(United States) (Guatemala)	Nicholas Jinadasa; Heymard Humblers	21; 6	19; 21	21; 19
5	(United States) (Guatemala)	Phillip Chew / Tony Gunawan; Kevin Cordón / Rodolfo Ramírez				not played

== Women's team ==
=== Round robin ===
Pos	Team	Pld	W	L	MF	MA	MD	GF	GA	GD	PF	PA	PD	Pts	Qualification
1	United States (H)	4	4	0	18	2	+16	37	6	+31	862	406	+456	4	2012 Uber Cup
2	Canada	4	3	1	17	3	+14	36	7	+29	839	439	+400	3	
3	Brazil	4	2	2	9	11	−2	19	23	−4	618	717	−99	2	
4	Barbados	4	1	3	3	17	−14	8	35	−27	483	839	−356	1	
5	Puerto Rico	4	0	4	3	17	−14	7	36	−29	460	861	−401	0	

Source: BWF
(H) Host
- Canada vs. Brazil

Canada
5
Los Angeles Badminton Club, Court 2
17 February 2012, 09:00 UTC−8

Brazil
0

			1	2	3
1	(Canada) (Brazil)	Michelle Li; Lohaynny Vicente	21; 9	21; 11
2	(Canada) (Brazil)	Joycelyn Ko; Paula Pereira	21; 8	21; 7
3	(Canada) (Brazil)	Alex Bruce / Michelle Li; Lohaynny Vicente / Luana Vicente	21; 13	21; 13
4	(Canada) (Brazil)	Kristen Tsai; Yasmin Cury	21; 10	21; 7
5	(Canada) (Brazil)	Grace Gao / Joycelyn Ko; Paula Pereira / Fabiana Silva	21; 5	21; 10

- United States vs. Barbados

United States
5
Los Angeles Badminton Club, Court 4
17 February 2012, 09:00 UTC−8

Barbados
0

			1	2	3
1	(United States) (Barbados)	Rena Wang; Shari Hope	21; 8	21; 10
2	(United States) (Barbados)	Iris Wang; Sabrina Scott	21; 3	21; 10
3	(United States) (Barbados)	Jamie Subandhi; Monyata Riviera	21; 4	21; 3
4	(United States) (Barbados)	Iris Wang / Rena Wang; Mariama Eastmond / Shari Hope	21; 3	21; 1
5	(United States) (Barbados)	Eva Lee / Paula Lynn Obañana; Sabrina Scott / Shakeira Waithe	21; 8	21; 1

- Canada vs. Barbados

Canada
5
Los Angeles Badminton Club, Court 1
17 February 2012, 19:00 UTC−8

Barbados
0

			1	2	3
1	(Canada) (Barbados)	Michelle Li; Shari Hope	21; 0	21; 12
2	(Canada) (Barbados)	Joycelyn Ko; Sabrina Scott	21; 5	21; 4
3	(Canada) (Barbados)	Phyllis Chan; Mariama Eastmond	21; 6	21; 4
4	(Canada) (Barbados)	Grace Gao / Kristen Tsai; Monyata Riviera / Shakeira Waithe	21; 6	21; 6
5	(Canada) (Barbados)	Alex Bruce / Michelle Li; Mariama Eastmond / Shari Hope	21; 6	21; 10

- Puerto Rico vs. Brazil

Puerto Rico
1
Los Angeles Badminton Club, Court 3
17 February 2012, 19:00 UTC−8

Brazil
4

			1	2	3
1	(Puerto Rico) (Brazil)	Génesis Valentín; Lohaynny Vicente	10; 21	6; 21
2	(Puerto Rico) (Brazil)	Keara González; Fabiana Silva	9; 21	18; 21
3	(Puerto Rico) (Brazil)	Irytsha González; Yasmin Cury	14; 21	21; 18	21; 13
4	(Puerto Rico) (Brazil)	Saribel Cáceres / Génesis Valentín; Lohaynny Vicente / Luana Vicente	13; 21	4; 21
5	(Puerto Rico) (Brazil)	Irytsha González / Keara González; Paula Pereira / Fabiana Silva	12; 21	17; 21

- United States vs. Brazil

United States
5
Los Angeles Badminton Club, Court 3
18 February 2012, 10:30 UTC−8

Brazil
0

			1	2	3
1	(United States) (Brazil)	Rena Wang; Lohaynny Vicente	21; 12	21; 8
2	(United States) (Brazil)	Iris Wang; Fabiana Silva	21; 10	21; 7
3	(United States) (Brazil)	Jamie Subandhi; Yasmin Cury	21; 7	21; 8
4	(United States) (Brazil)	Iris Wang / Rena Wang; Lohaynny Vicente / Luana Vicente	21; 9	21; 5
5	(United States) (Brazil)	Eva Lee / Paula Lynn Obañana; Yasmin Cury / Paula Pereira	21; 5	21; 5

- Canada vs. Puerto Rico

Canada
5
Los Angeles Badminton Club, Court 4
18 February 2012, 10:30 UTC−8

Puerto Rico
0

			1	2	3
1	(Canada) (Puerto Rico)	Michelle Li; Génesis Valentín	21; 5	21; 2
2	(Canada) (Puerto Rico)	Phyllis Chan; Keara González	21; 8	21; 5
3	(Canada) (Puerto Rico)	Kristen Tsai; Irytsha González	21; 1	21; 9
4	(Canada) (Puerto Rico)	Grace Gao / Joycelyn Ko; Saribel Cáceres / Génesis Valentín	21; 6	21; 5
5	(Canada) (Puerto Rico)	Alex Bruce / Phyllis Chan; Irytsha González / Keara González	21; 7	21; 7

- Barbados vs. Brazil

Barbados
0
Los Angeles Badminton Club, Court 1
18 February 2012, 16:30 UTC−8

Brazil
5

			1	2	3
1	(Barbados) (Brazil)	Shari Hope; Lohaynny Vicente	19; 21	16; 21
2	(Barbados) (Brazil)	Sabrina Scott; Fabiana Silva	7; 21	8; 21
3	(Barbados) (Brazil)	Mariama Eastmond; Yasmin Cury	14; 21	17; 21
4	(Barbados) (Brazil)	Dionne Forde / Shari Hope; Lohaynny Vicente / Luana Vicente	12; 21	6; 21
5	(Barbados) (Brazil)	Mariama Eastmond / Shakeira Waithe; Paula Pereira / Fabiana Silva	21; 17	21; 23	11; 21

- United States vs. Puerto Rico

United States
5
Los Angeles Badminton Club, Court 3
18 February 2012, 16:30 UTC−8

Puerto Rico
0

			1	2	3
1	(United States) (Puerto Rico)	Rena Wang; Génesis Valentín	21; 7	21; 9
2	(United States) (Puerto Rico)	Iris Wang; Keara González	21; 8	21; 3
3	(United States) (Puerto Rico)	Jamie Subandhi; Irytsha González	21; 7	21; 10
4	(United States) (Puerto Rico)	Eva Lee / Paula Lynn Obañana; Saribel Cáceres / Génesis Valentín	21; 6	21; 6
5	(United States) (Puerto Rico)	Jamie Subandhi / Rena Wang; Irytsha González / Keara González	21; 8	21; 6

- Puerto Rico vs. Barbados

Puerto Rico
2
Los Angeles Badminton Club, Court 4
19 February 2012, 10:30 UTC−8

Barbados
3

			1	2	3
1	(Puerto Rico) (Barbados)	Génesis Valentín; Shari Hope	9; 21	16; 21
2	(Puerto Rico) (Barbados)	Keara González; Mariama Eastmond	17; 21	13; 21
3	(Puerto Rico) (Barbados)	Irytsha González; Monyata Riviera	21; 13	21; 17
4	(Puerto Rico) (Barbados)	Saribel Cáceres / Génesis Valentín; Shari Hope / Dionne Forde	21; 14	17; 21	7; 21
5	(Puerto Rico) (Barbados)	Irytsha González / Keara González; Mariama Eastmond / Shakeira Waithe	6; 21	21; 12	21; 18

- Canada vs. United States

Canada
2
Los Angeles Badminton Club, Court 2
19 February 2012, 16:30 UTC−8

United States
3

			1	2	3
1	(Canada) (United States)	Michelle Li; Rena Wang	21; 19	22; 20
2	(Canada) (United States)	Joycelyn Ko; Iris Wang	20; 22	14; 21
3	(Canada) (United States)	Kristen Tsai; Jamie Subandhi	17; 21	21; 15	21; 9
4	(Canada) (United States)	Alex Bruce / Michelle Li; Eva Lee / Paula Lynn Obañana	17; 21	21; 19	21; 23
5	(Canada) (United States)	Grace Gao / Joycelyn Ko; Jamie Subandhi / Rena Wang	6; 21	8; 21
