= Macao Forum =

Building in Sé, Macau

Coordinates: 22.194637°N 113.551791°E

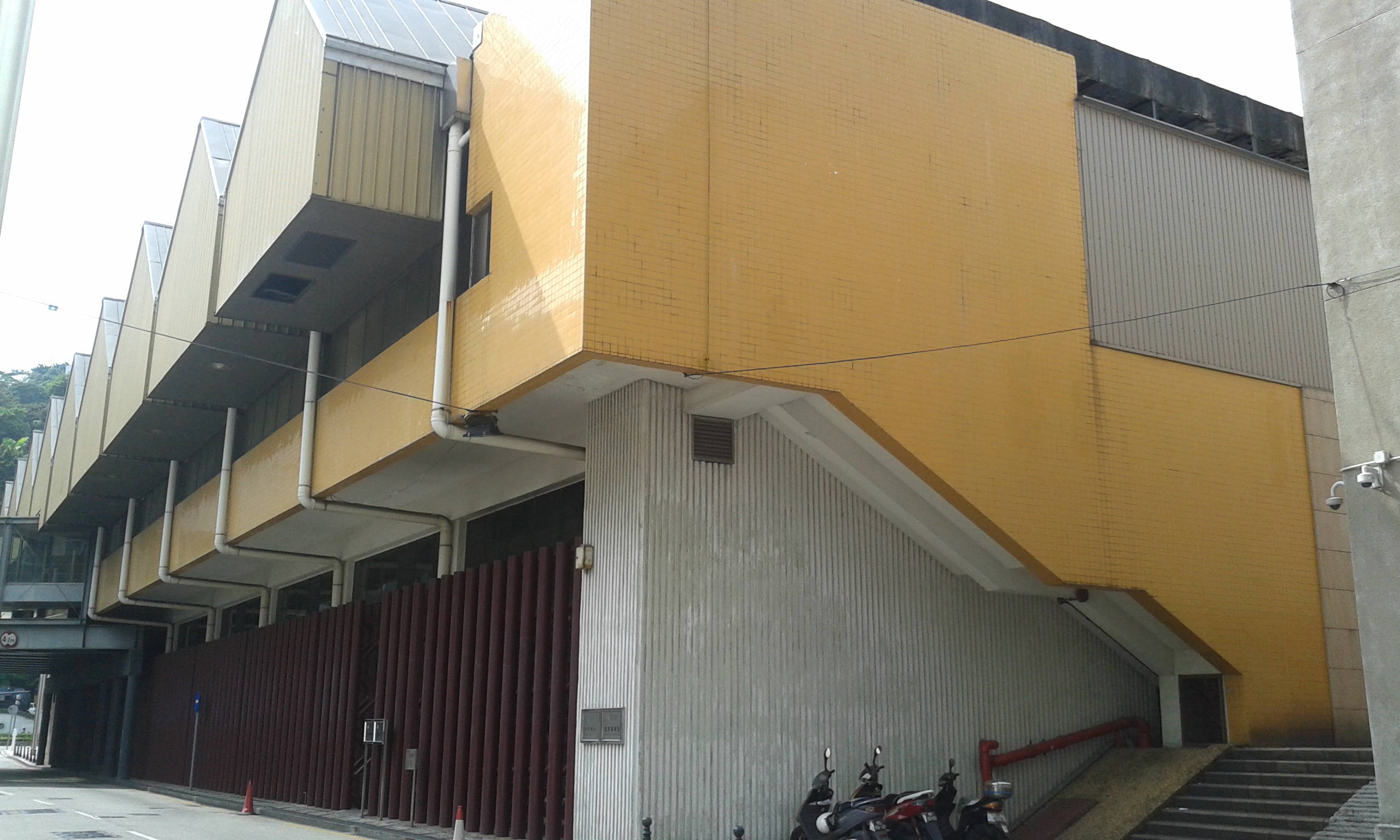
Macau Forum

Macau Forum (Chinese: 澳門綜藝館, Portuguese: Fórum de Macau) is a venue connected to the adjacent Macao Polytechnic University Multisport Pavilion and Media Centre located at Avenida de Marciano Baptista, in Sé, Macau, China. Macao Forum used to be the largest indoor venue in Macau before the completion of the Macao East Asian Games Dome. It comprises two pavilions: The main pavilion has a capacity of up to 4,000 and offers a competition area of 45 metres by 25 metres with a ceiling height of 12 metres, and the second pavilion can accommodate over 300 people with theatre-style-seating format and offers a performing area of 30 metres by 15 metres, which is suitable for different spectator sports and shows.

Macao Forum has been one of the venues for the annual FIVB Volleyball World Grand Prix series since 1994 and successfully held the Final in 2001 (suspended in 2003 and 2004 due to major overhaul for the 2005 East Asian Games).

== Notable events ==
- 2012 Macau Open Grand Prix Gold
- 2013 Macau Open Grand Prix Gold
