= 2012 Thomas & Uber Cup =

2012 Thomas & Uber Cup 2012年托马斯和尤伯杯

Tournament details
- Dates: 20 May – 27 May
- Edition: 27th (Thomas Cup); 24th (Uber Cup)
- Level: International
- Venue: Wuhan Sports Center Stadium
- Location: Wuhan, China

The 2012 Thomas & Uber Cup was the 27th tournament of the Thomas Cup and 24th international badminton tournament of the Uber Cup. It was held from May 20–27, 2012 at the Wuhan Sports Center Stadium in Wuhan, China.

== Host city selection ==
Jakarta (Indonesia) and Wuhan (China) submitted bids for the competition. Wuhan was announced as the host by BWF after a meeting in Qingdao during the 2011 Sudirman Cup.

== Qualifiers ==
Date	Confederation event	Location	Qualifier	
Date	Confederation event	Location	Thomas Cup	Uber Cup
February 13–19, 2012	Asia	Macau	Japan; Indonesia; Malaysia; South Korea	Japan; Thailand; Chinese Taipei; Indonesia
February 14–19, 2012	Europe	Amsterdam, Netherlands	Denmark; Germany; England; Russia	Germany; Denmark; Netherlands
February 17–19, 2012	Pan Am	California, United States	United States	United States
February 18–19, 2012	Oceania	Ballarat, Australia	New Zealand	Australia
February 22–29, 2012	Africa	Addis Ababa, Ethiopia	South Africa	South Africa
	Defending Champions		China	South Korea
	Host		China	China

== Seedings ==
All the seeding list based on March 1, 2012 world rankings as the draw was conducted on April 15, 2012. The top four seeding teams is in first pot, follow by next four teams in the second pot and the bottom four teams was put in the third pot.

For the knock out draw, to be held immediately after the group stage is completed, the four teams that had topped their group will be ranked according to their world ranking on the 17 May, and the top two seeds would then be separated each into one half. Seeds 3/4 will be drawn into each half, then followed by the remaining 5/8 seeded teams.

Thomas Cup

1. China
2. South Korea
3. Denmark
4. Japan
5. Indonesia
6. Malaysia
7. Germany
8. Russia
9. England
10. United States
11. New Zealand
12. South Africa

Uber Cup

1. China
2. Japan
3. South Korea
4. Chinese Taipei
5. Thailand
6. Denmark
7. Indonesia
8. Germany
9. Netherlands
10. United States
11. Australia
12. South Africa

== Medal summary ==
=== Medalists ===
Event	Gold	Silver	Bronze
Thomas Cup	China; Lin Dan; Chen Long; Chen Jin; Du Pengyu; Cai Yun; Fu Haifeng; Shen Ye; Hong Wei; Chai Biao; Guo Zhendong	South Korea; Lee Hyun-il; Son Wan-ho; Lee Dong-keun; Hong Ji-hoon; Jung Jae-sung; Lee Yong-dae; Ko Sung-Hyun; Kim Ki-jung; Kim Sa-rang	Japan; Sho Sasaki; Kenichi Tago; Takuma Ueda; Riichi Takeshita; Noriyasu Hirata; Hirokatsu Hashimoto; Hiroyuki Endo; Kenichi Hayakawa; Naoki Kawamae; Shoji Sato
Thomas Cup	China; Lin Dan; Chen Long; Chen Jin; Du Pengyu; Cai Yun; Fu Haifeng; Shen Ye; Hong Wei; Chai Biao; Guo Zhendong	South Korea; Lee Hyun-il; Son Wan-ho; Lee Dong-keun; Hong Ji-hoon; Jung Jae-sung; Lee Yong-dae; Ko Sung-Hyun; Kim Ki-jung; Kim Sa-rang	Denmark; Peter Gade; Jan Ø. Jørgensen; Viktor Axelsen; Hans-Kristian Vittinghus; Mathias Boe; Carsten Mogensen; Jonas Rasmussen; Joachim Fischer Nielsen; Mads Conrad-Petersen; Mads Pieler Kolding
Uber Cup	China; Wang Yihan; Wang Xin; Li Xuerui; Wang Shixian; Yu Yang; Wang Xiaoli; Zhao Yunlei; Tian Qing; Pan Pan; Cheng Shu	South Korea; Sung Ji-hyun; Bae Youn-joo; Hwang Hye-youn; Kim Soo-jin; Ha Jung-eun; Kim Min-jung; Jung Kyung-eun; Kim Ha-na; Eom Hye-won; Jang Ye-na	Thailand; Ratchanok Inthanon; Porntip Buranaprasertsuk; Sapsiree Taerattanachai; Nichaon Jindapon; Kunchala Voravichitchaikul; Duanganong Aroonkesorn; Saralee Thoungthongkam; Savitree Amitrapai
Uber Cup	China; Wang Yihan; Wang Xin; Li Xuerui; Wang Shixian; Yu Yang; Wang Xiaoli; Zhao Yunlei; Tian Qing; Pan Pan; Cheng Shu	South Korea; Sung Ji-hyun; Bae Youn-joo; Hwang Hye-youn; Kim Soo-jin; Ha Jung-eun; Kim Min-jung; Jung Kyung-eun; Kim Ha-na; Eom Hye-won; Jang Ye-na	Japan; Sayaka Sato; Eriko Hirose; Minatsu Mitani; Ai Goto; Mizuki Fujii; Reika Kakiiwa; Mami Naito; Shizuka Matsuo; Misaki Matsutomo; Ayaka Takahashi

=== Medal table ===
* Host nation (China)

Rank	Nation	Gold	Silver	Bronze	Total
1	China*	2	0	0	2
2	South Korea	0	2	0	2
3	Japan	0	0	2	2
4	Denmark	0	0	1	1
4	Thailand	0	0	1	1
Totals (5 entries)		2	2	4	8

== Thomas Cup ==
=== Groups ===
==== Group A ====
Team	Pts	Pld	W	L
China	2	2	2	0
Indonesia	1	2	1	1
England	0	2	0	2

20 May 2012
China	5–0	England
21 May 2012
Indonesia	4–1	England
22 May 2012
China	5–0	Indonesia

==== Group B ====
Team	Pts	Pld	W	L
Japan	2	2	2	0
Russia	1	2	1	1
New Zealand	0	2	0	2

20 May 2012
Japan	5–0	New Zealand
21 May 2012
Russia	5–0	New Zealand
22 May 2012
Japan	5–0	Russia

==== Group C ====
Team	Pts	Pld	W	L
Denmark	2	2	2	0
Malaysia	1	2	1	1
South Africa	0	2	0	2

20 May 2012
Denmark	5–0	South Africa
21 May 2012
Malaysia	5–0	South Africa
22 May 2012
Denmark	3–2	Malaysia

==== Group D ====
Team	Pts	Pld	W	L
South Korea	2	2	2	0
Germany	1	2	1	1
United States	0	2	0	2

20 May 2012
South Korea	5–0	United States
21 May 2012
Germany	5–0	United States
22 May 2012
South Korea	3–2	Germany

=== Knockout stage ===
All times are Chinese Standard Time (UTC+08:00).

Quarter-finals
23 May 2012
China	3
Malaysia	0
23 May 2012
Japan	3
Indonesia	2
23 May 2012
Russia	0
Denmark	3
23 May 2012
Germany	0
South Korea	3

Semi-finals
25 May 2012
China	3
Japan	0
25 May 2012
Denmark	1
South Korea	3

Final
27 May 2012
China	3
South Korea	0

==== Quarterfinals ====
Japan
3
Wuhan Sports Gymnasium Center Court 2
23 May 2012
13:00

Indonesia
2

			1	2	3
1	(Japan) (Indonesia)	Sho Sasaki; Simon Santoso	20; 22	14; 21
2	(Japan) (Indonesia)	Noriyasu Hirata / Hirokatsu Hashimoto; Markis Kido / Hendra Setiawan	21; 16	21; 18
3	(Japan) (Indonesia)	Kenichi Tago; Taufik Hidayat	21; 12	21; 17
4	(Japan) (Indonesia)	Hiroyuki Endo / Kenichi Hayakawa; Mohammad Ahsan / Alvent Yulianto	17; 21	13; 21
5	(Japan) (Indonesia)	Takuma Ueda; Dionysius Hayom Rumbaka	21; 14	21; 19

Russia
0
Wuhan Sports Gymnasium Center Court 4
23 May 2012
13:00

Denmark
3

			1	2	3
1	(Russia) (Denmark)	Vladimir Ivanov; Peter Gade	18; 21	13; 21
2	(Russia) (Denmark)	Ivan Sozonov; Jan Ø. Jørgensen	13; 21	11; 21
3	(Russia) (Denmark)	Evgenij Dremin / Sergey Lunev; Jonas Rasmussen / Mads Conrad-Petersen	12; 21	21; 17	18; 21
4	(Russia) (Denmark)	Denis Grachev; Viktor Axelsen				not played
5	(Russia) (Denmark)	Vladimir Ivanov / Ivan Sozonov; Mathias Boe / Carsten Mogensen				not played

China
3
Wuhan Sports Gymnasium Center Court 1
23 May 2012
19:00

Malaysia
0

			1	2	3
1	(China) (Malaysia)	Lin Dan; Daren Liew	17; 21	21; 9	21; 5
2	(China) (Malaysia)	Cai Yun / Fu Haifeng; Koo Kien Keat / Tan Boon Heong	21; 17	21; 18
3	(China) (Malaysia)	Chen Long; Muhammad Hafiz Hashim	21; 10	21; 11
4	(China) (Malaysia)	Shen Ye / Hong Wei; Lim Khim Wah / Goh V Shem				not played
5	(China) (Malaysia)	Chen Jin; Chong Wei Feng				not played

Germany
0
Wuhan Sports Gymnasium Center Court 3
23 May 2012
19:00

South Korea
3

			1	2	3
1	(Germany) (South Korea)	Marc Zwiebler; Lee Hyun-il	16; 21	21; 18	14; 21
2	(Germany) (South Korea)	Ingo Kindervater / Johannes Schöttler; Yoo Yeon-seong / Ko Sung-hyun	19; 21	11; 21
3	(Germany) (South Korea)	Dieter Domke; Son Wan-ho	20; 22	19; 21
4	(Germany) (South Korea)	Michael Fuchs / Oliver Roth; Lee Yong-dae / Kim Sa-rang				not played
5	(Germany) (South Korea)	Lukas Schmidt; Lee Dong-keun				not played

==== Semifinals ====
Denmark
1
Wuhan Sports Gymnasium Center Court 1
25 May 2012
13:00

South Korea
3

			1	2	3
1	(Denmark) (South Korea)	Peter Gade; Lee Hyun-il	21; 17	14; 21	10; 21
2	(Denmark) (South Korea)	Mathias Boe / Carsten Mogensen; Yoo Yeon-seong / Ko Sung-hyun	21; 10	21; 12
3	(Denmark) (South Korea)	Jan Ø. Jørgensen; Son Wan-ho	13; 21	21; 14	16; 21
4	(Denmark) (South Korea)	Jonas Rasmussen / Joachim Fischer Nielsen; Lee Yong-dae / Kim Sa-rang	21; 11	19; 21	15; 21
5	(Denmark) (South Korea)	Viktor Axelsen; Lee Dong-keun				not played

China
3
Wuhan Sports Gymnasium Center Court 1
25 May 2012
19:00

Japan
0

			1	2	3
1	(China) (Japan)	Lin Dan; Sho Sasaki	23; 21	21; 17
2	(China) (Japan)	Cai Yun / Fu Haifeng; Shoji Sato / Naoki Kawamae	25; 23	21; 18
3	(China) (Japan)	Chen Long; Kenichi Tago	21; 13	21; 16
4	(China) (Japan)	Shen Ye / Hong Wei; Noriyasu Hirata / Hirokatsu Hashimoto				not played
5	(China) (Japan)	Chen Jin; Takuma Ueda				not played

==== Final ====
China
3
Wuhan Sports Gymnasium Center Court 1
27 May 2012
14:00

South Korea
0

			1	2	3
1	(China) (South Korea)	Lin Dan; Lee Hyun-il	21; 14	21; 17
2	(China) (South Korea)	Cai Yun / Fu Haifeng; Lee Yong-dae / Kim Sa-rang	21; 16	25; 23
3	(China) (South Korea)	Chen Long; Son Wan-ho	21; 9	21; 13
4	(China) (South Korea)	Shen Ye / Hong Wei; Yoo Yeon-seong / Kim Ki-jung				not played
5	(China) (South Korea)	Chen Jin; Lee Dong-keun				not played

2012 Thomas Cup champion

China
Ninth title

== Uber Cup ==
=== Groups ===
==== Group A ====
Team	Pts	Pld	W	L
China	2	2	2	0
Indonesia	1	2	1	1
South Africa	0	2	0	2

20 May 2012
China	5–0	South Africa
21 May 2012
Indonesia	5–0	South Africa
22 May 2012
China	5–0	Indonesia

==== Group B ====
Team	Pts	Pld	W	L
Thailand	1	2	1	1
Chinese Taipei	1	2	1	1
Netherlands	1	2	1	1

20 May 2012
Chinese Taipei	2–3	Netherlands
21 May 2012
Thailand	5–0	Netherlands
22 May 2012
Chinese Taipei	3–2	Thailand

==== Group C ====
Team	Pts	Pld	W	L
South Korea	2	2	2	0
Germany	1	2	1	1
Australia	0	2	0	2

20 May 2012
South Korea	5–0	Australia
21 May 2012
Germany	3–2	Australia
22 May 2012
South Korea	5–0	Germany

==== Group D ====
Team	Pts	Pld	W	L
Japan	2	2	2	0
Denmark	1	2	1	1
United States	0	2	0	2

20 May 2012
Japan	5–0	United States
21 May 2012
Denmark	4–1	United States
22 May 2012
Japan	3–2	Denmark

=== Knockout stage ===
Quarter-finals
23 May 2012
China	3
Germany	0
23 May 2012
Thailand	3
Denmark	1
23 May 2012
Indonesia	2
Japan	3
23 May 2012
Chinese Taipei	2
South Korea	3

Semi-finals
24 May 2012
China	3
Thailand	0
24 May 2012
Japan	0
South Korea	3

Final
26 May 2012
China	3
South Korea	0

==== Quarterfinals ====
China
3
Wuhan Sports Gymnasium Center Court 1
23 May 2012
13:00

Germany
0

			1	2	3
1	(China) (Germany)	Wang Yihan; Karin Schnaase	21; 15	21; 17
2	(China) (Germany)	Yu Yang / Wang Xiaoli; Carla Nelte / Isabel Herttrich	21; 10	19; 21	21; 8
3	(China) (Germany)	Wang Xin; Carola Bott	21; 7	21; 7
4	(China) (Germany)	Zhao Yunlei / Tian Qing; Johanna Goliszewski / Karin Schnaase				not played
5	(China) (Germany)	Li Xuerui; Fabienne Deprez				not played

Thailand
3
Wuhan Sports Gymnasium Center Court 3
23 May 2012
13:00

Denmark
1

			1	2	3
1	(Thailand) (Denmark)	Ratchanok Inthanon; Tine Baun	18; 21	12; 21
2	(Thailand) (Denmark)	Porntip Buranaprasertsuk; Karina Jørgensen	18; 21	21; 18	21; 12
3	(Thailand) (Denmark)	Sapsiree Taerattanachai; Line Kjaersfeldt	21; 19	13; 21	21; 18
4	(Thailand) (Denmark)	Saralee Thungthongkam / Kunchala Voravichitchaikul; Marie Roepke / Line Damkjaer Kruse	21; 15	21; 17
5	(Thailand) (Denmark)	Sapsiree Taerattanachai / Duanganong Aroonkesorn; Kamilla Rytter Juhl / Christinna Pedersen				not played

Indonesia
2
Wuhan Sports Gymnasium Center Court 2
23 May 2012
19:00

Japan
3

			1	2	3
1	(Indonesia) (Japan)	Maria Febe Kusumastuti; Sayaka Sato	14; 21	10; 21
2	(Indonesia) (Japan)	Greysia Polii / Meiliana Jauhari; Mizuki Fujii / Reika Kakiiwa	18; 21	21; 15	19; 21
3	(Indonesia) (Japan)	Adriyanti Firdasari; Eriko Hirose	21; 13	20; 22	21; 14
4	(Indonesia) (Japan)	Anneke Feinya Agustin / Nitya Krishinda Maheswari; Mami Naito / Shizuka Matsuo	21; 11	21; 17
5	(Indonesia) (Japan)	Lindaweni Fanetri; Minatsu Mitani	21; 19	13; 21	17; 21

Chinese Taipei
2
Wuhan Sports Gymnasium Center Court 4
23 May 2012
19:00

South Korea
3

			1	2	3
1	(Chinese Taipei) (South Korea)	Tai Tzu-ying; Sung Ji-hyun	21; 18	23; 25	14; 21
2	(Chinese Taipei) (South Korea)	Cheng Wen-hsing / Chien Yu-chin; Kim Min-jung / Ha Jung-eun	19; 21	21; 18	21; 17
3	(Chinese Taipei) (South Korea)	Pai Hsiao-ma; Bae Youn-joo	14; 21	21; 18	21; 14
4	(Chinese Taipei) (South Korea)	Wang Pei-rong / Hsieh Pei-chen; Kim Ha-na / Jung Kyung-eun	14; 21	21; 18	11; 21
5	(Chinese Taipei) (South Korea)	Hung Shih-han; Hwang Hye-youn	18; 21	23; 25

==== Semifinals ====
South Korea
3
Wuhan Sports Gymnasium Center Court 1
24 May 2012
13:00

Japan
0

			1	2	3
1	(South Korea) (Japan)	Sung Ji-hyun; Sayaka Sato	21; 15	21; 10
2	(South Korea) (Japan)	Kim Min-jung / Ha Jung-eun; Mizuki Fujii / Reika Kakiiwa	21; 13	17; 21	21; 14
3	(South Korea) (Japan)	Bae Youn-joo; Eriko Hirose	21; 15	21; 17
4	(South Korea) (Japan)	Kim Ha-na / Jung Kyung-eun; Misaki Matsutomo / Ayaka Takahashi				not played
5	(South Korea) (Japan)	Hwang Hye-youn; Minatsu Mitani				not played

China
3
Wuhan Sports Gymnasium Center Court 1
24 May 2012
19:00

Thailand
0

			1	2	3
1	(China) (Thailand)	Wang Yihan; Ratchanok Inthanon	21; 18	21; 15
2	(China) (Thailand)	Yu Yang / Wang Xiaoli; Duanganong Aroonkesorn / Kunchala Voravichitchaikul	21; 16	21; 12
3	(China) (Thailand)	Wang Xin; Porntip Buranaprasertsuk	21; 17	21; 2
4	(China) (Thailand)	Zhao Yunlei / Tian Qing; Saralee Thungthongkam / Sapsiree Taerattanachai				not played
5	(China) (Thailand)	Li Xuerui; Nichaon Jindapon				not played

==== Final ====
China
3
Wuhan Sports Gymnasium Center Court 1
26 May 2012
14:00

South Korea
0

			1	2	3
1	(China) (South Korea)	Wang Yihan; Sung Ji-hyun	14; 21	22; 20	21; 13
2	(China) (South Korea)	Yu Yang / Wang Xiaoli; Kim Min-jung / Ha Jung-eun	21; 15	21; 13
3	(China) (South Korea)	Wang Xin; Bae Youn-joo	21; 10	21; 16
4	(China) (South Korea)	Zhao Yunlei / Tian Qing; Jung Kyung-eun / Kim Ha-na				not played
5	(China) (South Korea)	Li Xuerui; Hwang Hye-youn				not played

2012 Uber Cup champion

China
Twelfth title
